= 1945–46 AC Torino season =

Associazione Calcio Torino
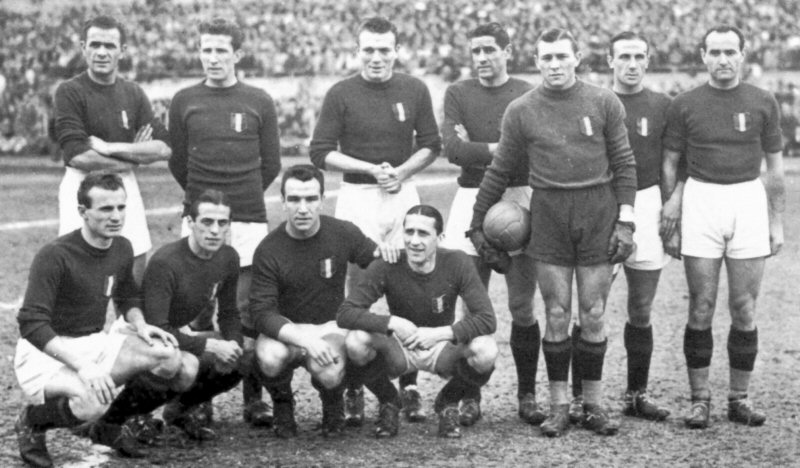
- Chairman: Ferruccio Novo
- Manager: Luigi Ferrero
- Stadium: Stadio Filadelfia
- Divisione Nazionale: 1st
- Top goalscorer: Gabetto (22)
| Home colours | Away colours |

During the 1945–1946 season Associazione Calcio Torino competed in Divisione Nazionale.

== Summary ==
Concluded the last Alta Italia Championship in July 1944, Torino FIAT after several months of rest, re-open trainings over winter, disputing 2 derbies for beneficial organizations trying to organize a spring tournament with Juventus-Cisitalia, Filiale Italia, Lancia e Ispettorato del Lavoro. Matches played in front of a massive attendances despite being beneficial. The championship Divisione Nazionale was disputed after the World War II with a format of groups being Torino the winner of the trophy.

== Squad ==
Note: Flags indicate national team as defined under FIFA eligibility rules; some limited exceptions apply. Players may hold more than one non-FIFA nationality.

| Pos. | Nation | Player |
|---|---|---|
| GK | ITA | Valerio Bacigalupo |
| GK | ITA | Alfredo Bodoira |
| DF | ITA | Aldo Ballarin |
| DF | ITA | Virgilio Maroso |
| DF | ITA | Sergio Piacentini |
| DF | ITA | Mario Rigamonti |
| MF | ITA | Eusebio Castigliano |
| MF | ITA | Giuseppe Grezar |

| Pos. | Nation | Player |
|---|---|---|
| MF | ITA | Ezio Loik |
| MF | ITA | Alfonso Santagiuliana |
| FW | ITA | Pietro Ferraris II |
| FW | ITA | Guglielmo Gabetto |
| FW | ITA | Oreste Guaraldo |
| FW | ITA | Valentino Mazzola (Captain) |
| FW | ITA | Franco Ossola |
| FW | ITA | Adriano Zecca |

=== Transfers ===
In
| Pos. | Name | from | Type |
|---|---|---|---|
| GK | Valerio Bacigalupo | Savona | (160.000 £) |
| GK | Filippo Cavalli | Casale | loan ended |
| DF | Aldo Ballarin | Triestina | (1.600.000 £) |
| DF | Virgilio Maroso | Alessandria | loan ended |
| DF | Mario Rigamonti | Brescia | loan ended |
| MF | Eusebio Castigliano | Spezia | (600.000 £) |
| MF | Giuseppe Grezar | Ampelea | loan ended |
| MF | Alfonso Santagiuliana | Vicenza | |
| MF | Giuseppe Vairo | Casale | loan ended |
| FW | Oreste Guaraldo | (North Carolina) Cinzano | |
| FW | Romeo Menti II | Milano | loan ended |
| FW | Adriano Zecca | Liguria | |

Out
| Pos. | Name | To | Type |
|---|---|---|---|
| GK | Filippo Cavalli | Como | |
| GK | Luigi Griffanti | Fiorentina | loan ended |
| DF | Luigi Cassano | Alessandria | |
| DF | Osvaldo Ferrini | Como | |
| MF | Fioravante Baldi | Napoli | |
| MF | Aldo Cadario | Brescia | loan ended |
| MF | Giacinto Ellena | Alessandria | |
| MF | Cesare Gallea | Brescia | |
| MF | Paolo Giammarco | Bari | loan ended |
| MF | Giuseppe Vairo | Alessandria | |
| FW | Romeo Menti II | Fiorentina | loan out |
| FW | Silvio Piola | Lazio | loan ended |

== Competitions ==
=== Divisione Nazionale ===
==== Alta Italia Group ====
Alta Italia Group
| Pos | Team | Pld | W | D | L | GF | GA | GD | Pts | Qualification |
|---|---|---|---|---|---|---|---|---|---|---|
| 1 | Torino (A) | 26 | 19 | 4 | 3 | 65 | 18 | +47 | 42 | National final round |
| 2 | Internazionale (A) | 26 | 17 | 5 | 4 | 52 | 21 | +31 | 39 | National final round |
| 3 | Juventus (A) | 26 | 13 | 9 | 4 | 52 | 23 | +29 | 35 | National final round |
| 4 | Milan (A) | 26 | 12 | 6 | 8 | 38 | 36 | +2 | 30 | Qualified after tie-breaker |
| 5 | Brescia | 26 | 12 | 6 | 8 | 38 | 33 | +5 | 30 | Tie-breaker |

Source: Panini
(A) Advance to a further round

===== Matches =====
Win Draw Loss

| 14 October 1945 1 | Juventus | 2–1 | Torino | Turin |
| 15:00 UTC+1 | Magni 40'; Piola 79' (pen.) | | 44' Loik | Stadium: Comunale; Attendance: 31 402; Referee: Giovanni Galeati |

| 21 October 1945 2 | Torino | 6–0 | Genoa | Turin |
| 15:00 UTC+1 | Mazzola 13'; Ossola 31'; Loik 43', 68' (pen.); Guaraldo 51', 56' | | | Stadium: Stadio Filadelfia; Referee: Giuseppe Carpani |

| 28 October 1945 3 | Sampierdarenese | 0–5 | Torino | Genova |
| 15:00 UTC+1 | | | 2' Ferraris II; 31', 81' Castigliano; 64', 87' Mazzola | Stadium: Stadio Luigi Ferraris; Referee: Giorgio Bernardi |

| 4 November 1945 4 | Torino | 3–1 | Venezia | Turin |
| 14:30 UTC+1 | Loik 46'; Zaro 60' (o.g.); Ferraris II 61' | | 14' Novello | Stadium: Stadio Filadelfia; Referee: Bruno Bergomi |

| 18 November 1945 5 | Torino | 2–2 | Brescia | Turin |
| 14:30 UTC+1 | Loik 24'; Ferraris II 30' | | 2', 12' Rebuzzi II | Stadium: Stadio Filadelfia; Referee: Eliseo Camiolo |

| 25 November 1945 6 | Modena | 0–3 | Torino | Modena |
| 14:30 UTC+1 | | | 63' Mazzola; 77' Ossola; 82' Ferraris II | Stadium: Stadio Cesare Marzari; Referee: Eriprando Poggipollini |

| 2 December 1945 7 | Torino | 4–0 | Milan | Turin |
| 14:30 UTC+1 | Loik 21', 57' (pen.); Mazzola 69', 83' | | | Stadium: Stadio Filadelfia; Referee: Giorgio Bernardi |

| 9 December 1945 8 | Vicenza | 1–2 | Torino | Vicenza |
| 14:30 UTC+1 | Marchetti 2' | | 16' Gabetto; 67' Loik | Stadium: Comunale; Referee: Giovanni Galeati |

| 16 December 1945 9 | Torino | 2–0 | Atalanta | Turin |
| 14:30 UTC+1 | Gabetto 25'; Ossola 68' | | | Stadium: Stadio Filadelfia; Referee: Fornari |

| 23 December 1945 10 | Bologna | 0–2 | Torino | Bologna |
| 14:30 UTC+1 | | | 44' Gabetto; 78' Ossola | Stadium: Stadio Comunale; Referee: Ferruccio Bellè |

| 30 December 1945 11 | Torino | 4–0 | Triestina | Turin |
| 14:30 UTC+1 | Ossola 15', 73'; Gabetto 40'; Ferraris II 75' | | | Stadium: Stadio Filadelfia; Referee: Massironi |

| 6 January 1946 12 | Inter | 1–1 | Torino | Milan |
| 14:30 UTC+1 | Candiani 61' | | 51' Loik | Stadium: Arena Civica; Referee: Giuseppe Zelocchi |

| 13 January 1946 13 | Andrea Doria | 2–3 | Torino | Genova |
| 14:30 UTC+1 | Rebuzzi I 16', 35' | | 32' Ferraris II; 71', 72' Gabetto | Referee: Giorgio Bernardi |

| 27 January 1946 15 | Genoa | 0–1 | Torino | Genova |
| 14:30 UTC+1 | | | 84' Ballarin | Stadium: Stadio Luigi Ferraris; Referee: Ferruccio Bonivento |

| 3 February 1946 16 | Torino | 2–1 | Sampierdarenese | Turin |
| 15:00 UTC+1 | Ferraris II 18'; Castigliano 36' | | 20' Parvis | Stadium: Stadio Filadelfia; Referee: Angelo Pizzato |

| 10 February 1946 17 | Venezia | 2–1 | Torino | Venice |
| 15:00 UTC+1 | Alberti 66' (pen.); Pernigo 70' | | 46' Loik | Stadium: Stadio Pier Luigi Penzo; Referee: Giuseppe Carpani |

| 17 February 1946 18 | Brescia | 1–3 | Torino | Brescia |
| 15:00 UTC+1 | De Filippis 85' | | 16' Castigliano; 37' Gabetto; 40' Mazzola | Stadium: Stadium di Viale Piave; Referee: Raffaele Scorzoni |

| 24 February 1946 19 | Torino | 1–1 | Modena | Turin |
| 15:00 UTC+1 | Gabetto 57' | | 76' Dalla Torre | Stadium: Stadio Filadelfia; Referee: Sandro Buratti |

| 3 March 1946 20 | Milan | 2–3 | Torino | Milan |
| 15:00 UTC+1 | Gimona 32'; Ballarin 51' (o.g.) | | 66' Ossola; 69' Gabetto; 80' Castigliano | Stadium: Stadio San Siro; Referee: Giovanni Galeati |

| 10 March 1946 21 | Torino | 4–0 | Vicenza | Turin |
| 15:00 UTC+1 | Ferraris II 60'; Gabetto 66', 87'; Castigliano 69' | | | Stadium: Stadio Filadelfia; Referee: Guglielmo Matucci |

| 17 March 1946 22 | Atalanta | 1–0 | Torino | Bergamo |
| 15:30 UTC+1 | Del Medico 86' | | | Stadium: Stadio Comunale; Referee: Mario Scotto |

| 19 March 1946 14 | Torino | 1–0 | Juventus | Turin |
| 15:30 UTC+1 | Castigliano 4' | | | Stadium: Stadio Filadelfia; Referee: Ferruccio Bellè |

| 24 March 1946 23 | Torino | 4–0 | Bologna | Turin |
| 15:30 UTC+1 | Mazzola 5', 63'; Loik 55'; Ossola 70' | | | Stadium: Stadio Filadelfia; Referee: Guido Agnolin |

| 31 March 1946 24 | Triestina | 1–1 | Torino | Trieste |
| 15:30 UTC+1 | Presca 62' | | 87' Gabetto | Stadium: Stadio Comunale; Referee: Eliseo Camiolo |

| 7 April 1946 25 | Torino | 1–0 | Inter | Turin |
| 15:30 UTC+1 | Gabetto 43' | | | Stadium: Stadio Filadelfia; Referee: Mario Scotto |

| 14 April 1946 26 | Torino | 5–0 | Andrea Doria | Turin |
| 15:30 UTC+1 | Mazzola 13', 36'; Gabetto 22', 40'; Ossola 52' | | | Stadium: Stadio Filadelfia; Referee: Antonio Zambotto |

=== Final Round ===
Final round
| Pos | Team | Pld | W | D | L | GF | GA | GD | Pts | Qualification |
|---|---|---|---|---|---|---|---|---|---|---|
| 1 | Torino (C) | 14 | 11 | 0 | 3 | 43 | 14 | +29 | 22 | Champions |
| 2 | Juventus | 14 | 9 | 3 | 2 | 31 | 8 | +23 | 21 | |
| 3 | Milan | 14 | 7 | 2 | 5 | 25 | 16 | +9 | 16 | |
| 4 | Internazionale | 14 | 6 | 2 | 6 | 20 | 16 | +4 | 14 | |
| 5 | Napoli | 14 | 5 | 3 | 6 | 19 | 27 | −8 | 13 | |

Source: Panini
(C) Champions

==== Matches ====
| 28 April 1946 1 | Roma | 0–7 | Torino | Rome |
| 16:00 UTC+1 | | | 5' Castigliano; 6', 18' Mazzola; 7' Ossola; 8' Ferraris II; 15' Loik; 46' Grezar | Stadium: Stadio Nazionale; Referee: Raffaele Scorzoni |

| 5 May 1946 2 | Torino | 3–0 | Milan | Turin |
| 16:00 UTC+1 | Mazzola 4'; Castigliano 12'; Ferraris II 79' | | | Stadium: Stadio Filadelfia; Referee: Giuseppe Fois |

| 12 May 1946 3 | Napoli | 0–2 | Torino | Naples |
| 16:00 UTC+1 | | | 22', 28' Gabetto | Stadium: Stadio della Liberazione; Referee: Giovanni Galeati |

| 19 May 1946 4 | Torino | 3–0 | Bari | Turin |
| 16:00 UTC+1 | Ossola 39'; Castigliano 53'; Loik 67' | | | Stadium: Stadio Filadelfia; Referee: Eliseo Camiolo |

| 26 May 1946 5 | Torino | 1–0 | Inter | Turin |
| 16:00 UTC+1 | Gabetto 30' | | | Stadium: Stadio Filadelfia; Referee: Giovanni Galeati |

| 30 May 1946 6 | Juventus | 1–0 | Torino | Turin |
| 16:00 UTC+1 | Piola 32' (pen.) | | | Stadium: Stadio Comunale; Referee: Generoso Dattilo |

| 9 June 1946 7 | Pro Livorno | 0–3 | Torino | Livorno |
| 16:30 UTC+1 | | | 53' Santagiuliana; 59', 71' Ferraris II | Stadium: Stadio Ardenza; Referee: Ferruccio Bonivento |

| 16 June 1946 8 | Torino | 3–2 | Roma | Turin |
| 16:30 UTC+1 | Grezar 37'; Castigliano 41', 67' (pen.) | | 39' (pen.), 51' Amadei | Stadium: Stadio Filadelfia; Referee: Ferruccio Bellè |

| 23 June 1946 9 | Milan | 2–0 | Torino | Milan |
| 16:30 UTC+1 | Grezar 31' (o.g.); Puricelli 51' | | | Stadium: Stadio San Siro; Referee: Giorgio Bernardi |

| 30 June 1946 10 | Torino | 7–1 | Napoli | Turin |
| 17:00 UTC+1 | Castigliano 6', 79', 60'; Loik 8', 61'; Mazzola 13', 86' | | 34' Baldi III | Stadium: Stadio Filadelfia; Referee: Luigi Gemini |

| 7 July 1946 11 | Bari | 1–2 | Torino | Bari |
| 17:00 UTC+1 | Lenzi 80' (pen.) | | 3' (o.g.) Fusco; 78' Castigliano | Stadium: Stadio della Vittoria; Referee: Eriprando Poggipollini |

| 14 July 1946 12 | Inter | 6–2 | Torino | Milan |
| 17:30 UTC+1 | Candiani 16' (pen.), 60', 40'; Fabbri 52', 77'; Muci 85' | | 11' Castigliano; 67' Grezar | Stadium: Arena Civica; Referee: Raffaele Scorzoni |

| 21 July 1946 13 | Torino | 1–0 | Juventus | Turin |
| 17:30 UTC+1 | Gabetto 19' | | | Stadium: Stadio Filadelfia; Attendance: 23 000; Referee: Giovanni Galeati |

| 28 July 1946 14 | Torino | 9–1 | Pro Livorno | Turin |
| 17:30 UTC+1 | Gabetto 14', 41', 40'; Castigliano 46', 88'; Grezar 48'; Loik 69'; Ballarin 73'; Mazzola 79' | | 18' Picchi | Stadium: Stadio Filadelfia; Attendance: 7 500; Referee: Luigi Gemini |

== Statistics ==
=== Squad statistics ===
| Competition | Points | Home | | | | | | Away | | | | | | Total | | | | | | GD |
| Competition | Points | G | V | D | L | Gs | Ga | G | V | D | L | Gs | Ga | G | V | D | L | Gs | Ga | GD |
|---|---|---|---|---|---|---|---|---|---|---|---|---|---|---|---|---|---|---|---|---|
| Divisione Nazionale | - | 20 | 18 | 2 | 0 | 66 | 9 | 20 | 12 | 2 | 6 | 42 | 23 | 40 | 30 | 4 | 6 | 108 | 32 | +76 |

=== Players statistics ===
==== Appearances ====
- 40. (Italy) Valerio Bacigalupo
- 40. (Italy) Aldo Ballarin
- 38. (Italy) Eusebio Castigliano
- 38. (Italy) Pietro Ferraris
- 35. (Italy) Guglielmo Gabetto
- 35. (Italy) Giuseppe Grezar
- 11. (Italy) Oreste Guaraldo
- 39. (Italy) Ezio Loik
- 35. (Italy) Virgilio Maroso
- 36. (Italy) Valentino Mazzola
- 30. (Italy) Franco Ossola
- 10. (Italy) Sergio Piacentini
- 36. (Italy) Mario Rigamonti
- 16. (Italy) Alfonso Santagiuliana
- 2. (Italy) Adriano Zecca

==== Goalscorers ====
- 2. (Italy) Aldo Ballarin
- 20. (Italy) Eusebio Castigliano
- 12. (Italy) Pietro Ferraris
- 22. (Italy) Guglielmo Gabetto
- 4. (Italy) Giuseppe Grezar
- 2. (Italy) Oreste Guaraldo
- 16. (Italy) Ezio Loik
- 16. (Italy) Valentino Mazzola
- 11. (Italy) Franco Ossola
- 1. (Italy) Alfonso Santagiuliana

== See also ==
Grande Torino
