= 1946–47 AC Torino season =

Associazione Calcio Torino
1946-47 season
- Chairman: Ferruccio Novo
- Manager: Luigi Ferrero
- Stadium: Stadio Filadelfia
- Serie A: 1st
- Top goalscorer: Mazzola (29)
Home colours	Away colours

During the 1946–1947 season Associazione Calcio Torino competed in Serie A.

== Summary ==
After winning the championship last season, the team clinched again the title with a great performance in the second part of the season with a format of sole group. Valentino Mazzola scored a massive 29 goals to help Torino reach a back-to-back championship.

The wounds of war were healing and football returned to a single-round system. The league, due to the immediate difficulties to find the sixteen best teams, was played with a huge tournament of twenty teams, then occupying 38 days, from September to July 1947. Torino did not make substantial changes to its team, but had strengthened the park of players. Along with the return of Romeo Menti, came the midfielder Danilo Martelli from Brescia, the back-stopper Francesco Rosetta of Novara, the goalkeeper Dante Piani, the Vercellese Guido Tieghi.

From the 21st round the Granata returned to the lead, gradually strengthening their position and subsequently winning the tournament, with a ten-point lead over Juventus. Torino, after a last misstep with Sampdoria (the only team in the tournament to take away three points out of four from Torino) put together a sixteen match unbeaten run, of which fourteen were victories, beginning with the derby won by Guglielmo Gabetto, to go to other successes such as the five goals against Inter and Atalanta, the six against Vicenza, Genoa and Milan. That attack ended with 104 goals scored, an average of nearly three per game, and with Valentino Mazzola Serie A top-scorer.

== Squad ==
Source: Note: Flags indicate national team as defined under FIFA eligibility rules; some limited exceptions apply. Players may hold more than one non-FIFA nationality.

Pos.	Nation	Player
GK	ITA	Valerio Bacigalupo
GK	ITA	Dante Piani
DF	ITA	Aldo Ballarin
DF	ITA	Virgilio Maroso
DF	ITA	Mario Rigamonti
DF	ITA	Francesco Rosetta
MF	ITA	Eusebio Castigliano
MF	ITA	Giuseppe Grezar

Pos.	Nation	Player
MF	ITA	Ezio Loik
MF	ITA	Danilo Martelli
FW	ITA	Pietro Ferraris II
FW	ITA	Guglielmo Gabetto
FW	ITA	Valentino Mazzola (Captain)
FW	ITA	Romeo Menti II
FW	ITA	Franco Ossola
FW	ITA	Guido Tieghi

=== Transfers ===
In
Pos.	Name	from	Type
GK	Dante Piani	Triestina	
DF	Francesco Rosetta	Novara	
MF	Danilo Martelli	Brescia	(5.200.000 £)
FW	Romeo Menti II	Fiorentina	loan ended
FW	Guido Tieghi	Pro Vercelli	

Out
Pos.	Name	To	Type
GK	Alfredo Bodoira	Alessandria	
DF	Sergio Piacentini	Sampdoria	
MF	Alfonso Santagiuliana	Vicenza	
FW	Oreste Guaraldo	Novara	loan out
FW	Adriano Zecca	Modena	

== Competitions ==
=== Serie A ===
==== League table ====
Pos	Team	Pld	W	D	L	GF	GA	GD	Pts
1	Torino (C)	38	28	7	3	104	35	+69	63
2	Juventus	38	22	9	7	83	38	+45	53
3	Modena	38	21	9	8	45	24	+21	51
4	Milan	38	19	12	7	75	52	+23	50
5	Bologna	38	15	9	14	42	41	+1	39

Source: Panini
(C) Champions

==== Matches ====
Win Draw Loss

22 September 1946 1	Torino	1–1	Triestina	Turin
15:30 UTC+1	Gabetto 85'	Report	11' Sollazzo	Stadium: Stadio Filadelfia; Referee: Otello Piselli

29 September 1946 2	Lazio	1–2	Torino	Rome
15:30 UTC+1	Puccinelli 43'	Report	12' Gabetto; 34' Mazzola	Stadium: Stadio Nazionale; Referee: Giovanni Galeati

6 October 1946 3	Torino	1–1	Sampdoria	Turin
15:30 UTC+1	Mazzola 32'	Report	56' Baldini	Stadium: Stadio Filadelfia; Referee: Giorgio Bernardi

13 October 1946 4	Venezia	1–0	Torino	Venice
15:00 UTC+1	Zambelli 46'	Report		Stadium: Stadio Pier Luigi Penzo; Referee: Giuseppe Zelocchi

20 October 1946 5	Torino	0–0	Juventus	Turin
15:00 UTC+1		Report		Stadium: Stadio Filadelfia; Referee: Ferruccio Bellè

27 October 1946 6	Roma	1–3	Torino	Rome
15:00 UTC+1	Amadei 87'	Report	33' Ossola; 78' Castigliano; 83' Mazzola	Stadium: Stadio Nazionale; Referee: Bruno Zilli

3 November 1946 7	Inter	1–3	Torino	Milan
14:30 UTC+1	Bovio 32'	Report	13' Ossola; 80' Gabetto; 86' (o.g.) Cominelli	Stadium: Arena Civica; Referee: Giuseppe Fois

10 November 1946 8	Torino	4–0	Bologna	Turin
14:30 UTC+1	Castigliano 33'; Ossola 44'; Ferraris II 78'; Loik 81' (pen.)	Report		Stadium: Stadio Filadelfia; Referee: Ferruccio Bellè

17 November 1946 9	Torino	4–0	Brescia	Turin
14:30 UTC+1	Mazzola 16', 52'; Grezar 51'; Loik 64'	Report		Stadium: Stadio Filadelfia; Referee: Bruno Tassini

24 November 1946 10	Vicenza	0–3	Torino	Vicenza
14:30 UTC+1		Report	41' Gabetto; 75' Mazzola; 85' Ossola	Stadium: Comunale; Referee: Giorgio Bernardi

8 December 1946 11	Torino	3–2	Livorno	Turin
14:30 UTC+1	Mazzola 10'; Gabetto 15'; Castigliano 45'	Report	62' Stua; 83' (pen.) Raccis	Stadium: Stadio Filadelfia; Attendance: 13 000; Referee: Luciano Limido

15 December 1946 12	Napoli	2–2	Torino	Naples
14:30 UTC+1	Andreolo 63'; Busani 73'	Report	12', 84' Gabetto	Stadium: Stadio della Liberazione; Referee: Luigi Gemini

22 December 1946 13	Torino	7–2	Fiorentina	Turin
14:30 UTC+1	Magli 7' (o.g.); Mazzola 17'; Ossola 34', 44'; Grezar 50'; Gabetto 83'; Loik 85'	Report	33', 82' Gregorin	Stadium: Stadio Filadelfia; Attendance: 8 000; Referee: Giovanni Galeati

29 December 1946 14	Atalanta	0–3	Torino	Bergamo
14:30 UTC+1		Report	19', 44' Mazzola; 50' Ossola	Stadium: Comunale; Attendance: 10 000; Referee: Guido Agnolin

5 January 1947 15	Genoa	2–3	Torino	Genoa
14:30 UTC+1	Verdeal 85'; Trevisan 88' (pen.)	Report	11' Ossola; 52' Grezar; 70' Ferraris II	Stadium: Stadio Luigi Ferraris; Referee: Achille Pizziolo

12 January 1947 16	Torino	2–1	Bari	Turin
14:30 UTC+1	Tieghi 15'; Mazzola 67' (pen.)	Report	19' (pen.) Tontodonati	Stadium: Stadio Filadelfia; Referee: Angelo Pizzato

19 January 1947 17	Alessandria	2–0	Torino	Alessandria
14:30 UTC+1	Bertoni 79'; Stradella 90'	Report		Stadium: Stadio Giuseppe Moccagatta; Referee: Ferruccio Bellè

26 January 1947 18	Milan	1–2	Torino	Milan
14:30 UTC+1	Puricelli 80'	Report	48' Gabetto; 86' Menti II	Stadium: Stadio San Siro; Referee: Giorgio Bernardi

2 February 1947 19	Torino	1–1	Modena	Turin
15:00 UTC+1	Menti II 18'	Report	46' Brighenti I	Stadium: Stadio Filadelfia; Referee: Ferruccio Bonivento

16 February 1947 20	Triestina	0–1	Torino	Trieste
15:00 UTC+1		Report	89' Ossola	Stadium: Stadio Comunale; Referee: Guglielmo Matucci

23 February 1947 21	Torino	5–1	Lazio	Turin
15:00 UTC+1	Mazzola 31', 80', 68'; Gabetto 62'; Menti II 72'	Report	79' Koenig	Stadium: Stadio Filadelfia; Attendance: 15 000; Referee: Mario Codeluppi

2 March 1947 22	Sampdoria	3–1	Torino	Genoa
15:00 UTC+1	Bassetto 47', 62'; Fiorini 73'	Report	15' Menti II	Stadium: Stadio Luigi Ferraris; Attendance: 30 000; Referee: Giorgio Bernardi

9 March 1947 23	Torino	2–0	Venezia	Turin
15:00 UTC+1	Menti II 29' (pen.); Ferraris II 70'	Report		Stadium: Stadio Filadelfia; Referee: Eliseo Camiolo

16 March 1947 24	Juventus	0–1	Torino	Turin
15:00 UTC+1		Report	26' Gabetto	Stadium: Comunale; Attendance: 60 000; Referee: Generoso Dattilo

23 March 1947 25	Torino	4–0	Roma	Turin
15:30 UTC+1	Mazzola 15'; Gabetto 52', 65'; Ferraris II 88'	Report		Stadium: Stadio Filadelfia; Referee: Guido Agnolin

30 March 1947 26	Torino	5–2	Inter	Turin
15:30 UTC+1	Grezar 1'; Mazzola 30', 57'; Menti II 31'; Gabetto 55'	Report	14', 19' Neri II	Stadium: Stadio Filadelfia; Attendance: 15.000; Referee: Ferruccio Bonivento

6 April 1947 27	Bologna	1–1	Torino	Bologna
15:30 UTC+1	Valcareggi 4'	Report	63' Loik	Stadium: Stadio Comunale; Attendance: 46.000; Referee: Guido Agnolin

13 April 1947 28	Brescia	0–1	Torino	Brescia
15:30 UTC+1		Report	15' Loik	Stadium: Stadium di Viale Piave; Attendance: 46 000; Referee: Generoso Dattilo

20 April 1947 29	Torino	6–0	Vicenza	Turin
15:30 UTC+1	Loik 24'; Mazzola 29', 31', 30'; Ferraris II 57'; Gabetto 64'	Report		Stadium: Stadio Filadelfia; Referee: Massironi

4 May 1947 30	Livorno	0–2	Torino	Livorno
16:00 UTC+1		Report	10' Castigliano; 79' Gabetto	Stadium: Stadio Ardenza; Attendance: 20 000; Referee: Luigi Gemini

18 May 1947 31	Torino	2–1	Napoli	Turin
16:00 UTC+1	Castigliano 7'; Ferraris II 59'	Report	20' Barbieri	Stadium: Stadio Filadelfia; Referee: Luigi Valsecchi

25 May 1947 32	Fiorentina	0–4	Torino	Florence
16:00 UTC+1		Report	44' Ferraris II; 49' Mazzola; 60' Castigliano; 89' Loik	Stadium: Stadio Comunale; Attendance: 40 000; Referee: Giuseppe Zelocchi

1 June 1947 33	Torino	5–3	Atalanta	Turin
16:00 UTC+1	Loik 14'; Ferraris II 25'; Mazzola 56', 66', 64'	Report	43' (o.g.) Rosetta; 54' Cergoli; 85' Meucci	Stadium: Stadio Filadelfia; Attendance: 7 000; Referee: Ferruccio Bonivento

8 June 1947 34	Torino	6–0	Genoa	Turin
16:45 UTC+1	Loik 20'; Mazzola 21', 56', 28'; Martelli 46'; Castigliano 60'	Report		Stadium: Stadio Filadelfia; Attendance: 20 000; Referee: Ferruccio Bellè

15 June 1947 35	Bari	0–0	Torino	Bari
16:30 UTC+1		Report		Stadium: Stadio della Vittoria; Referee: Giuseppe Vannini

22 June 1947 36	Torino	4–1	Alessandria	Turin
17:00 UTC+1	Ossola 8', 14'; Loik 73' (pen.), 79'	Report	89' Sotgiu	Stadium: Stadio Filadelfia; Referee: Eliseo Camiolo

29 June 1947 37	Torino	6–2	Milan	Turin
17:00 UTC+1	Gabetto 11', 90', 82'; Mazzola 23'; Castigliano 76'; Ossola 80'	Report	28' Carapellese; 48' (pen.) Tosolini	Stadium: Stadio Filadelfia; Referee: Achille Pizziolo

6 July 1947 38	Modena	2–4	Torino	Modena
17:00 UTC+1	Brighenti I 50'; Del Medico 85'	Report	2' Tieghi; 31' Ossola; 38' Mazzola; 70' Loik	Stadium: Stadio Cesare Marzari; Referee: Generoso Dattilo

== Statistics ==
=== Squad statistics ===
Competition	Points	Home						Away						Total						GD
Competition	Points	G	V	D	L	Gs	Ga	G	V	D	L	Gs	Ga	G	V	D	L	Gs	Ga	GD
Serie A	63	19	15	4	0	68	18	19	13	3	3	36	17	38	28	7	3	104	35	+69

=== Players statistics ===
==== Appearances ====
- 25. (Italy) Valerio Bacigalupo
- 38. (Italy) Aldo Ballarin
- 27. (Italy) Eusebio Castigliano
- 34. (Italy) Pietro Ferraris
- 35. (Italy) Guglielmo Gabetto
- 35. (Italy) Giuseppe Grezar
- 30. (Italy) Ezio Loik
- 33. (Italy) Virgilio Maroso
- 17. (Italy) Danilo Martelli
- 38. (Italy) Valentino Mazzola
- 14. (Italy) Romeo Menti
- 29. (Italy) Franco Ossola
- 13. (Italy) Dante Piani
- 34. (Italy) Mario Rigamonti
- 13. (Italy) Francesco Rosetta
- 3. (Italy) Guido Tieghi

==== Goalscorers ====
- 29. (Italy) Valentino Mazzola
- 19. (Italy) Guglielmo Gabetto
- 13. (Italy) Franco Ossola
- 12. (Italy) Ezio Loik
- 8. (Italy) Eusebio Castigliano
- 8. (Italy) Pietro Ferraris
- 4. (Italy) Giuseppe Grezar
- 1. (Italy) Danilo Martelli
- 6. (Italy) Romeo Menti
- 2. (Italy) Guido Tieghi

== See also ==
- Grande Torino
