= Giuseppe Grezar =

Italian footballer (1918–1949)

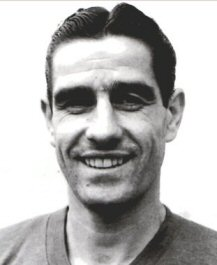

Personal information
- Date of birth: 25 November 1918
- Place of birth: Trieste, Italy
- Date of death: 4 May 1949 (aged 30)
- Place of death: Superga, Italy
- Position: Midfielder

Senior career*
Years	Team	Apps	(Gls)
1938–1942	Triestina	83	(51)
1942–1943	Torino	30	(3)
1943	Ampelea	15	(1)
1945–1949	Torino	123	(16)

International career
1942–1948	Italy	8	(1)
- * Club domestic league appearances and goals

Giuseppe "Pino" Grezar (Italian pronunciation: [dʒuˈzɛppe ɡrеˈdzar]; 25 November 1918 – 4 May 1949) was an Italian football player, who played as a midfielder for Torino F.C. and died in the Superga air disaster together with the whole Grande Torino team.

== Career ==
Grezar was born in Trieste. He played as a midfielder, debuting for Triestina. He was acquired by Torino in 1942.

With Torino, Grezar played 154 times and won five consecutive Serie A scudetti, until dying with most of the team in the Superga air disaster near Turin, in May 1949. He was capped eight times for the Italy national team, scoring one goal. He also played with Ampelea Isola in 1944.

The Stadio Giuseppe Grezar in Trieste is dedicated to him.

== Honours ==
Torino

- Serie A: 1942–43, 1945–46, 1946–47, 1947–48, 1948–49
- Coppa Italia: 1942–43

Individual

- Torino FC Hall of Fame: 2016
