= Grande Torino =

Italian football team in the 1940s

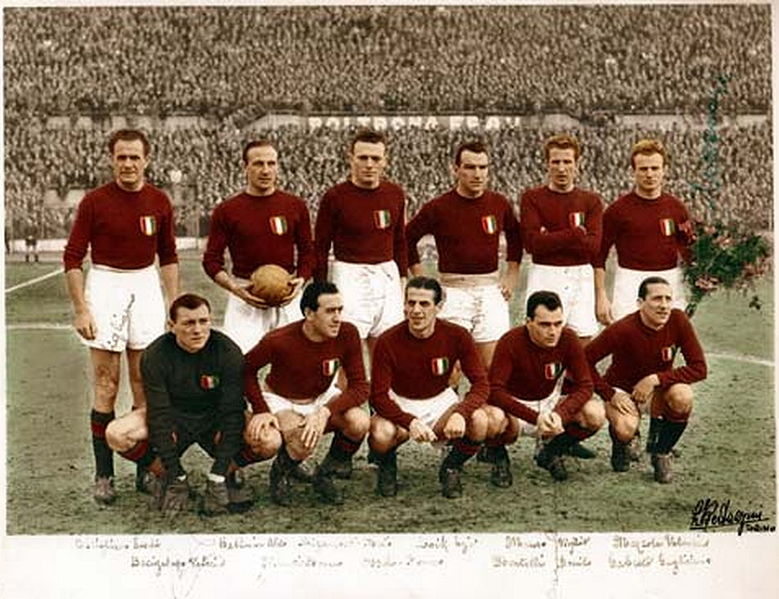
A formation of the Grande Torino, multiple champions of Italy

The Grande Torino (Italian for 'Great Torino') was the historic Italian football team of Torino Football Club in the 1940s, five-time champions of Italy, whose players were the backbone of the Italy national team and died on 4 May 1949, in the plane crash known as the Superga air disaster. With this name, although it is commonly used to identify the team that died in the disaster, it defines the entire sports cycle which lasted eight years and led to the conquest of 5 consecutive championships, equaling the record previously set by Juventus of the Quinquennio d'oro; Grande Torino also won a Coppa Italia.

== Ferruccio Novo's tenure ==
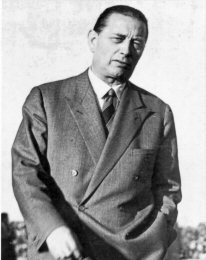
Ferruccio Novo

In the summer of 1939, the industrialist Ferruccio Novo, at age 42, assumed the presidency of Torino, succeeding Giovanni Battista Cuniberti. Novo was not a patron, but a careful administrator: he had entered Torino at a young age, even donning the jersey as a player, in 1913, a subpar player ("I was a duffer," he said smiling), he continued to follow the team as an enthusiastic fan first, then with the tasks socio-financier and advisor. He also once started a factory of leather accessories with his brother.

His first moves as Torino president were therefore ones to reorganize the club, and following the suggestions of Vittorio Pozzo, make management more similar to the models of the English teams, then at the forefront: he surrounded himself with competent employees, such former players Antonio Janni and Mario Sperone (Italian Champions 1928), and Giacinto Ellena; Rinaldo Agnisetta was given the role of managing director; Roberto Copernicus, who owned a clothing store, was named the role of counsellor; Englishman Leslie Lievesley was given the role of youth coach; while the technical direction of the team was given to Ernest Egri Erbstein, who, of Jewish origin, worked incognito because of the racial laws.

The first "hit" of Novo was to purchase a talented 18-year-old Franco Ossola from Varese that, with hindsight, would be first piece of the squad: Ossola cost 55 thousand Italian lire, a small amount at the time, under the suggestion Janni (who had managed Varese) and Ellena. He made his debut on 4 February 1940, in 1–0 win against Novara. That year, Ossola played two more matches, against Bologna and Napoli.

== World War II ==
Italy, which until then had remained neutral, on 10 June 1940, entered World War II on the side of the Axis powers. Benito Mussolini was so sure the war would be a "lightning war" that he announced the players would remain at home, claiming: "We need them more on the fields than the army."

The following year, Ossola showed his value as top scorer for the Granata, scoring 14 goals from 22 appearances, but the team as a whole did not change form. Torino ended the season in seventh position with 30 points, nine less than champions Bologna. Two players retired that year: Oberdan Ussello, who in turn took over the youth team; and Raf Vallone, who devoted himself to a career in cinema and theatre.

The foresight to Novo allowed him to take advantage of the climate of stagnation and lack of investment. There was little money in football, which Novo anticipated. In view of the 1941–42 Serie A season, Torino brought in five new players: Ferraris II, who played on the left wing for 1938 FIFA World Cup champions Italy, was signed from Ambrosiana for 250,000 lire; Romeo Menti, a winger with good technique and a powerful shot who was signed from Fiorentina at the recommendation of Ellena; and Alfredo Bodoira, Felice Borel and Guglielmo Gabetto, all from Turin city rivals Juventus.

The arrival of Gabetto at Torino was due in part to Borel, who, perhaps to reward Novo for his faith after acquiring him from Juventus after years of misunderstanding techniques, revealed Gabetto, which Juventus considered was "finished" as a player, would be sold to the Genoa for 300,000 lire. Borel suggested to raise the bid and Novo purchased the striker for 330,000 lire.

== From the metodo to the sistema ==
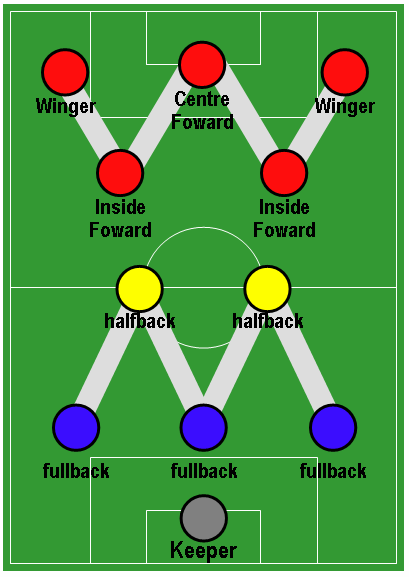
The tactical formation of the sistema

The turning point came when Felice Borel (who in the future would hold the role of manager), Ellena and Copernicus suggested to Novo that Torino should be set up with the sistema tactic, a new form of the game in those years. Until then, the most popular tactic was the metodo, a more defensive arrangement whose strength was mainly the counterattack, which had allowed the Italy national team of Vittorio Pozzo to win the 1934 and 1938, World Cups. In defence, there were only two fullbacks and a defensive midfielder which shuttled forward on the offence. In midfield, the offence was set by the centre midfielders, while the wingers were designed to serve the ball for the striker. The attacking phase was not easy, as the offside rule stipulated there must be three players between the striker and the goal, therefore only one defender had to advance to trigger the offside trap.

In 1926, the offside rule was changed: two players needed to advance to trigger offside. This created many immediate difficulties for the teams of the time and greatly increased the number of goals in the league. In the 1930s, Englishman Herbert Chapman, manager of Arsenal, developed a new tactic called the sistema or "WM" which in practice was a type of 3–2–2–3 formation, with three defenders, four midfielders (two half-backs and two inside-forwards) and three forwards positioned at the points of a "W" and "M". Chapman, reorganizing the defence, chose to move back a holding midfielder, creating a de facto "stopper", while the full-backs were tasked with marking the wingers. The tasks of marking were simpler, and being a mirrored array man marking was born. The system was also more dynamic, more balanced and, if played with the right players, was a tactic that for the first time guaranteed control of the "hotspot", the midfield. This was set to four players arranged in a square (as placed precisely at the top of "W" and "M") and involved the use of two midfielders and two mezzepunte. Novo approved the suggestion and based Torino on this tactic.

Novo hired Hungarian manager András Kuttik to replace Tony Cargnelli. Ellena was given a position in centre midfield, a role he previously held at Fiorentina, until then the only Italian club to experiment with the tactic, albeit with little success. The change of tactic also interested Italy manager Vittorio Pozzo, who had already begun to shape his own national side on his "block", Torino. The 1941–42 season was the prerogative of Roma. That year, two losses proved to be Torino's undoing: a first round exit in the Coppa Italia and a Serie A loss with three matches remaining against Venezia, which was led by Ezio Loik and Valentino Mazzola.

== 1941–1943 ==
The Torino squad of 1941–42 was a competitive team but two defeats against Venezia, due to the efforts of Italy internationals Valentino Mazzola and Ezio Loik, cost them both the Coppa Italia and the league title. After the last defeat to Venezia, which in practice put an end to the dreams of the tricolor granata, Novo went to the Torino dressing room and signed Mazzola and Loik there and then, for a combined fee of 1,400,000 liras. Two other players, Petron and Mezzadra, were also signed.

A notable detail is that Juventus was also pursuing the two players, particularly Virginio Rosetta, and a deal with the Bianconeri appeared close to completion. However, Novo's determination thwarted Juventus's plans, allowing Torino to secure the two final pieces needed to complete the squad.

Thus was born the team that would become legendary as the Grande Torino. At the start of the 1942–43 season, Hungarian coach Kuttik had at his disposal a remarkably talented squad. In goal were the experienced Bodoira and Cavalli. The defense featured reliable players such as Ferrini and Ellena, alongside the talented Piacentini and Cassano. In midfield, veterans Baldi and Gallea were joined by the newly arrived Ezio Loik and Valentino Mazzola. Up front, Menti and Ferraris led the attack, while Gabetto and Ossola provided additional quality and depth.

== War championship of 1944 ==
In 1944 Italy, now devastated by war, is broken in two by the Gothic Line. The fascist regime fell, the US military advanced in the south of the peninsula. Yet the league goes ahead and, at the decision of the Federation, was organised into a group stage. Transfers are however difficult since the bombing of the Allies, often interrupting rail links, forcing travelers to face long walking.

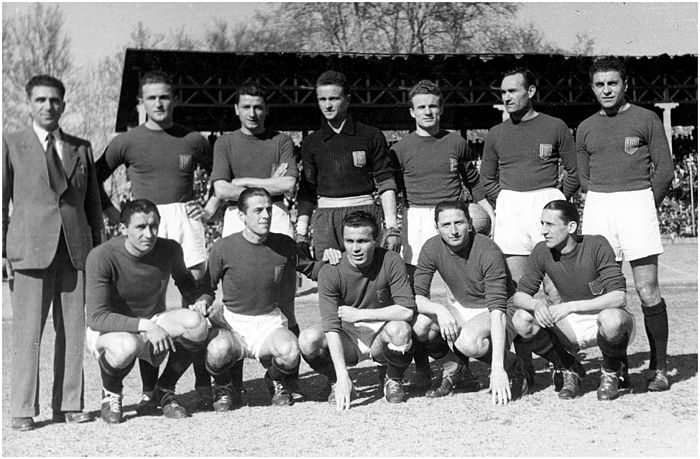
The union of Torino FIAT, reinforced by Silvio Piola and protagonist in the championship of the war in 1944.

To prevent the risk of call to arms, many teams are ingenious: with clever diplomacy, they ensure their players are part of the most important industries in the country, by passing them as indispensable to the national production of the defence industry, managing effectively to exempt them from use on the front. The Torino of Novo found such a collaboration with FIAT, creating the FIAT Torino, a name similar to that of a corporate structure: in fact, Mazzola and the other, for the sake of appearances, are in fact classified as workers in the automobile of the Agnelli; some photos of that portray them on the lathe and machine tools. The cousins of Juventus, moreover, similarly had emigrated in turn to Alba to the Cisitalia, a car factory belonging to the then Juventus president Piero Dusio.

In Torino play the goalkeeper Luigi Griffanti, from the national team, taken from Fiorentina, and the Vercellese Silvio Piola, a striker coming from Lazio, who came to the North to take his family to the Capital, and instead remained stuck in Upper Italy due to the armistice. In the championship of war played to the north, in the first group stage, Torino was inserted in the group Ligure-Piemontese. The team beat 7–1 Genoa and Biella, 7–0 Alexandria, for the 8–2 Novara and Juventus 5–0. In the semifinal round Torino faced Ambrosiana-Inter, Varese and Juventus; the derby concluded in a 1–3 defeat and a 3–3 draw, then comes the victory against Inter, thus giving way to the final round of three – along with Spezia Calcio (playing as VV.FF. Spezia for the reasons explained above similarly to Torino FIAT) and Venezia – which is played at Arena Civica in Milan.

Torino would eventually lose tournament, due in part to an unofficial match of the national team, organised for propaganda purposes, held in Trieste two days before the game against Spezia Calcio. Despite the trip made difficult by the operations of war, the president Novo, underestimating their opponents, rejects the proposal of the Federation to postpone the match against Spezia Calcio who, fresher, leave Milan. The "Fire Brigade", which came from the 1–1 draw against Venice, in the decisive match prevail 2–1, thus making unnecessary the subsequent victory of the Granata at Venezia 5–2. The Spezia Calcio title was officially recognised by FIGC in 2002 as decoration. Following the decision of FIGC in 2002, Spezia is authorized by the Italian Federation to exhibit a tricolour badge on the official jerseys which is unique, being the only example of a permanent one in Italy. The badge has a different shape and size compared to the ordinary Scudetto.

== After World War II ==
After the end of the Second World War Italy was found in rubble and broken in two. The fierce fighting along the Gothic Line of winter 1944 had severely undermined, if not destroyed, the lines of communication from the Apennine Mountains, making it very difficult to travel between the Po Valley and the Italian Peninsula. Under these conditions, the Federation decided to restart the championship of football with a one-off formula. For the first time since 1929, the tournament was not played in a single round.

In the North of the country was organised a Championship of Northern Italy (officially the Divisione Nazionale) which was placed in continuity with the pre-war Serie A, there being open to all club that would have been entitled to participate in the top flight of the suppressed 1943–44 season. In southern Italy the situation was even more complex, since there were insufficient clubs in the top flight. The solution was found by organising a mixed tournament between the teams of Serie A and those of Serie B.

At the conclusion of the two groups, the top four teams in each league would qualify to the final round which would determine the winner of the championship, with a structure that remembered that of championships prior to 1926, with the only difference that in those tournaments only two teams qualified. Because of this complex mechanism, the 1945–46 championship, while appearing regularly in the record books, is not assimilated to those of Serie A and does not appear in the statistics.

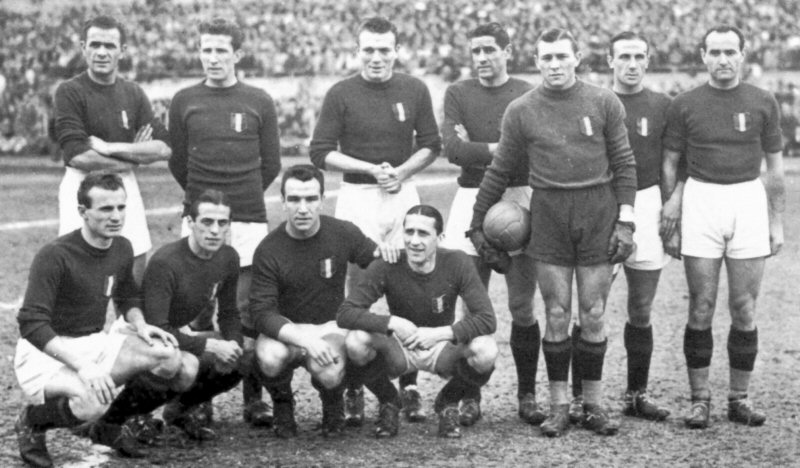
The "Grande Torino" of 1945–46

On 14 October 1945, the championship began with the Scudetto on the shirts of Torino. Ferruccio Novo gave the team the final arrangement with the arrival of goalkeeper Valerio Bacigalupo from Savona, the defender Aldo Ballarin from Triestina, from which he had already "fished" Giuseppe Grezar, the return of Virgilio Maroso from Alessandria, central midfielder Mario Rigamonti from Brescia, and winger Eusebio Castigliano and forward Pietro Ferraris both from Spezia.

Virtually revolutionised in defence and an attack identical to the past, Novo relied on the Torinese Luigi Ferrero, a former Torino winger of the pre-war period, that as a coach had been successful at A.S. Bari. The derby opened the championship and Torino immediately suffered their first defeat: Silvio Piola decided the match—who had moved to Juventus after the parenthesis at Torino in 1944—with a penalty. In the following two rounds, Torino scored eleven goals without conceding against Genoa and Sampierdarenese, beginning a rousing march in the group, which led to Torino breaking all records. The Granata defeated Juventus in the return derby, scheduled in January, but recovered in mid-March, with a goal of Eusebio Castigliano. The round ended with a three-point advantage on Inter Milan, followed by Juventus and A.C. Milan. The final round gave access to the southern teams, Napoli, A.S. Bari, A.S. Roma and Pro Livorno.

The beginning was overwhelming: Torino played in Rome and scored six goals in 30 minutes in the first half, followed by a seventh goal in the second half. Among the other high-scoring matches, Torino defeated Napoli 7–1 and on the final day Pro Livorno 9–1. Juventus beat Torino in the second match (by a penalty of Silvio Piola) and on the penultimate day held a two-point lead. In the return derby, with a goal from Guglielmo Gabetto, Torino drew level with the Bianconeri at the top. On the last day, Torino scored nine goals at the Filadefia against Pro Livorno, while Juventus were held to a 1–1 draw in Naples. The Scudetto was won by Torino, the third in its history, the second triumph of the team of Ferruccio Novo.

== 1946–47 season ==
The wounds of war were healing and football returned to a single-round system. The league, due to the immediate difficulties to find the sixteen best teams, was played with a huge tournament of twenty teams, then occupying 38 days, from September to July 1947. Torino did not make substantial changes to its team, but had strengthened the park of players. Along with the return of Romeo Menti, came the midfielder Danilo Martelli from Brescia, the back-stopper Francesco Rosetta of Novara, the goalkeeper Dante Piani, the Vercellese Guido Tieghi.

Still under coach Luigi Ferrero, Torino began the season with a home draw with Triestina, and, after the narrow victory away to Lazio, another draw with Sampdoria and a defeat to Venezia, who was relegated in that season. On the fifth day there was the derby with Juventus, which finished 0–0. After five days, Torino managed to collect five points. From the sixth day, Torino collected six successive victories with the thirteenth day ahead. On the eighth day, 10 November 1946, Bologna arrived at the Filadelfia, unbeaten in seven games, with the keeper Glauco Vanz keeping a clean sheet since the beginning of the tournament. After a few minutes Giuseppe Grezar failed to convert a penalty, and around the 20th minute the ball reached Eusebio Castigliano, who scored from the edge of the area. Torino went on to win 4–0. In the locker room the president of Bologna was heard shouting to his team: "Are you crazy, don't you know that we also need to mark the midfield in Torino? And you left one free! Do you even know who Castigliano is?"

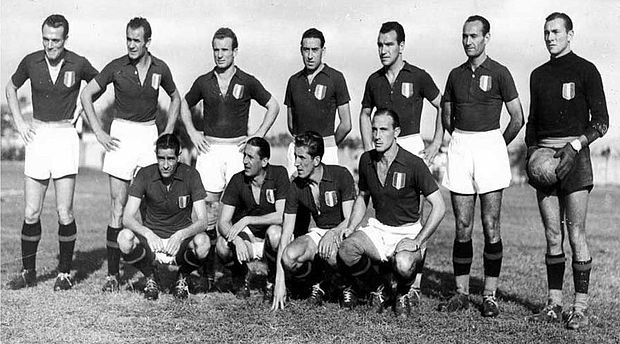
Torino in 1946–47

An even more resounding success of this phase came with a 7–2 win over Fiorentina, however, Torino lost the championship lead when they were defeated by Alessandria. Along with the home draw with Modena two weeks after, it would be the last time that Torino would drop points before the end of the tournament. From the 21st round the Granata returned to the lead, gradually strengthening their position and subsequently winning the tournament, with a ten-point lead over Juventus. Torino, after a last misstep with Sampdoria (the only team in the tournament to take away three points out of four from Torino) put together a sixteen match unbeaten run, of which fourteen were victories, beginning with the derby won by Guglielmo Gabetto, to go to other successes such as the five goals against Inter and Atalanta, the six against Vicenza, Genoa and Milan. That attack ended with 104 goals scored, an average of nearly three per game, and with Valentino Mazzola Serie A top-scorer.

== 1947–48 season ==
The Torino of 1947–48 Torino set many records throughout the season: top score in the standings, with 65 points in 40 games; the maximum advantage over 2nd place: 16 points over A.C. Milan, Juventus and Triestina; biggest home win, 10–0 against Alessandria; a total of 29 wins out of 40 games; the longest unbeaten run, 21, with 17 wins and 4 draws; the most points at home, having won 19 games out of 20 at Stadio Filadelfia; the highest number of goals scored, 125; and fewest conceded, 33. 125 goals in one season stands as the record for most ever goals scored in one of Europe's top five leagues.

== 1948–49 season ==
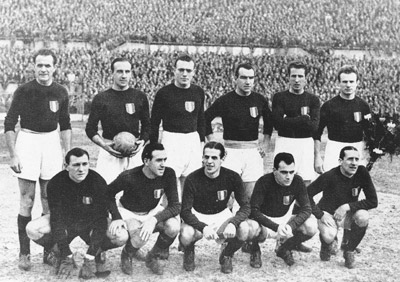
Torino in 1948–49

After a short summer interval from the end of previous season, competition officially resumed in Italy after the 1948 Summer Olympics. Prematurely eliminated, Vittorio Pozzo lost his position as sole commissioner of the Italy national team and Ferruccio Novo took his place. After some friendly matches, the season began in mid-September with a Torino almost identical to that of the previous championships; there was only Franco Ossola permanently in place of Pietro Ferraris, who, at age 36, had moved to Novara. The midfielder Rubens Fadini arrived from Gallarate, Dino Ballarin, brother of the goalkeeper Aldo was signed from Chioggia; the Hungarian-Czechoslovak Július Schubert, a left-sided midfielder; and strikers Émile Bongiorni and Ruggero Grava arrived from Racing Paris and Roubaix-Tourcoing respectively.

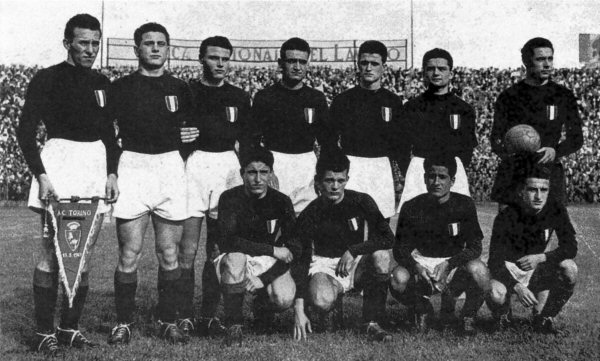
Torino composed of youth players

Torino began the season after a long tour in Brazil where the team met Palmeiras, Corinthians, São Paulo and Portuguesa, losing only once. During the season, reduced to 24 teams after three promotions and relegations, Ernest Erbstein was appointed as the team's technical director and the Englishman Leslie Lievesley became the coach. The season also saw injuries to Virgilio Maroso, Eusebio Castigliano, Romeo Menti and Sauro Tomà, plus the long suspension for Aldo Ballarin. The Granata, which debuted with a victory against Pro Patria, suffered a defeat in the second round to Atalanta; the team recovered with five straight wins, including that of the derby, but lost again, in Milan, against the Rossoneri.

Torino would relinquish the lead in the standings, then recapture it, finishing midway through the season on par with Genoa, from which a third defeat was suffered, losing 3–0. In the return leg of the derby Torino would defeat Juventus 3–0. Torino's advantage increased in the standings, gaining a maximum of six point on Inter in second place. However, a pair of draws (in Trieste and Bari) allowed Inter to close the gap within four points from Torino. On 30 April 1949, the two clubs met in Milan, ending 0–0, with Torino approaching their fifth consecutive title (the record would be equaled). The team travelled to Portugal to play in a friendly against Benfica. However, upon return Torino perished in the Superga air disaster.

== Superga air disaster ==
On 4 May 1949, the three-engined Fiat G.212 of Aviolinee Italiane found a thick fog that enveloped Turin and the surrounding hills. At 17:05, off course due to the lack of visibility, the aircraft crashed into the supporting wall of the Basilica of Superga. The impact caused the instantaneous death of all the 31 people on board, including players, coaching staff, journalists and crew. Because of the great reputation of the team, the tragedy was well covered in the world press, as well as in Italy. On the day of the funeral almost a million people took to the streets of Turin.

== Statistics ==
=== Grande Torino and Italy national team ===
Many players of the Grande Torino played in national team, forming the backbone of the team.

- Genoa, 5 April 1942: Italy – Croatia 4–0
  - 2 players: Ferraris II (1 goal) and Gabetto (1 goal)
- Milan, 19 April 1942: Italy – Spain 4–0
  - 1 player: Ferraris II (1 goal)
- Zürich, 11 November 1945: Switzerland – Italy 4–4
  - 7 players: Ballarin, Maroso, Mazzola, Grezar, Castigliano, Ferraris II, Loik (1 goal)
- Milan, 1 December 1946: Italy – Austria 3–2
  - 5 players: Maroso, Grezar, Ferraris II, Mazzola 1 goal), Castigliano (1 goal).
- Florence, 27 April 1947: Italy- Switzerland 5–2
  - 9 players: Castigliano, Ballarin, Gabetto, Maroso, Grezar, Ferraris II, Loik (1 goal), Mazzola (1 goal), Menti (3 goals)
- Turin, 11 May 1947: Italy- Hungary 3–2
  - 10 players: Ballarin, Maroso, Rigamonti, Grezar, Castigliano, Menti, Mazzola, Ferraris II, Loik (1 goal), Gabetto (2 goals). The only position not to come from Torino was goalkeeper, which was occupied by Lucidio Sentimenti from Juventus.
- Vienna, 9 November 1947: Austria – Italy 5–1
  - 4 players: Ballarin, Maroso, Castigliano, Mazzola.
- Bari, 14 December 1947: Italy – Czechoslovakia 3–1
  - 8 players: Bacigalupo, Ballarin, Grezar, Maroso, Loik, Mazzola, Menti (1 goal), Gabetto (1 goal).

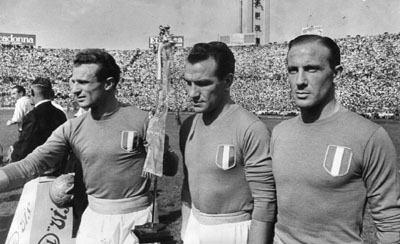
16 May 1948 Italy-England 0–4 Mazzola, Loik and Ballarin at the Comunale in Torino with the national team

- Paris, 4 April 1948: France – Italy 1–3
  - 8 players: Bacigalupo, Ballarin, Loik, Grezar, Rigamonti, Menti, Mazzola, Gabetto (1 goal).
- Turin, 16 May 1948: Italy – England 0–4
  - 7 players: Bacigalupo, Ballarin, Grezar, Menti, Loik, Gabetto, Mazzola.
- Genoa, 27 February 1949: Italy – Portugal 4–1
  - 7 players: Bacigalupo, Ballarin, Loik, Castigliano, Maroso (1 goal), Menti (1 goal), Mazzola (1 goal).
- Madrid, 27 March 1949: Spain – Italy 1–3
  - 6 players: Bacigalupo, Ballarin, Rigamonti, Castigliano, Menti, Mazzola.

Record of appearances and goals
Name	Birthplace	Role	Appearances	Goals
Valentino Mazzola	Cassano d'Adda – 26/01/1919	Mezz'ala	10	3
Aldo Ballarin	Chioggia – 10/01/1922	Full-back	9	-
Giuseppe Grezar	Trieste – 25/11/1918	Midfielder	7	-
Virgilio Maroso	Crosara di Marostica – 26/06/1925	Full-back	7	1
Romeo Menti	Vicenza – 05/09/1919	Winger	7	5
Ezio Loik	Fiume – 26/09/1919	Mezz'ala	7	3
Eusebio Castigliano	Vercelli – 09/02/1921	Midfielder	7	1
Guglielmo Gabetto	Turin – 24/02/1916	Centre forward	6	5
Pietro Ferraris	Vercelli – 15/02/1912	Winger	6	2
Valerio Bacigalupo	Vado Ligure – 12/03/1924	Goalkeeper	5	−8
Mario Rigamonti	Brescia – 17/12/1922	Stopper	3	-

== League statistics ==
League season	Position	Matches won	Matches lost	Draws	Goals scored	Average goals scored/per match	Goals conceded	Average goals conceded/per match	Win percentage
1942–43	1°	20	6	4	68	2.27	31	1.03	66.67%
1945–46	1°	19	3	4	65	2.50	18	0.69	73.08%
1946–47	1°	28	3	7	104	2.74	35	0.92	73.68%
1947–48	1°	29	4	7	125	3.13	33	0.82	72.50%
1948–49	1°	25	3	10	78	2.10	34	0.89	65.79%

== Bibliography ==
- AA.VV, "Speciale Grande Torino", Q&P, Torino, 1999
- AA.VV, "La concertina del Grande Torino", Agami, Cuneo, 1999
- AA.VV, "Mitissimo: Grande Torino mezzo secolo dopo Superga", Toro club Melfi, Melfi, 1999
- Campanella-Ormezzano-Tosatti, "Il Grande Torino", Reverdito edizioni, Lavis (TN), 1999
- Cudiona Giuseppina, "Valentino racconta", Torino, 1950
- Ossola-Tavella, "Il romanzo del Grande Torino", Newton & Compton, 1993
- Tavella Renato, "Capitan Valentino", Graphot, Torino, 1983
- Tomà Sauro, Me Grand Turin", Graphot, Torino, 1999
- Ossola Franco, "Grande Torino per sempre", Editrice Il Punto – Piemonte in Bancarella, Torino, 1998
- Ossola-Muliari, "Un secolo di Toro. Tra leggenda e storia cento anni di vita granata", Editrice Il Punto – Piemonte in Bancarella, Torino, 2005
- Ossola Franco, "365 volte Toro" Editrice Il Punto – Piemonte in Bancarella, Torino, 2006
- Beccaria Domenico, "Come nuvole nel vento – Il Grande Torino di Julius Schubert" Editrice Il Punto – Piemonte in Bancarella, Torino, 2014
