= Pietro Ferraris =

Italian footballer (1912–1991)

Personal information
- Date of birth: 15 February 1912
- Place of birth: Vercelli, Kingdom of Italy
- Date of death: 11 October 1991 (aged 79)
- Position: Forward

Senior career*
Years	Team	Apps	(Gls)
1929–1932	Pro Vercelli	86	(19)
1932–1936	Napoli	83	(13)
1936–1941	Ambrosiana-Inter	139	(43)
1941–1948	Torino	168	(55)
1948–1950	Novara	57	(20)
Total		533	(150)

International career
1935–1947	Italy	14	(3)
Medal record
Italy
FIFA World Cup
Winner	1938 France
- * Club domestic league appearances and goals

Pietro Ferraris (Italian pronunciation: [ˈpjɛːtro ferˈraːris]; 15 February 1912 – 11 October 1991) was an Italian footballer who played as a forward. Throughout his career, he won six Serie A titles with Ambrosiana-Inter and Torino, and the 1938 FIFA World Cup with the Italy national football team, where he scored Italy's fastest ever World Cup goal.

== Club career ==
Ferraris was born in Vercelli, Piedmont. He was also known as "Ferraris II", to distinguish him from Mario Ferraris I.

He made his club debut with Pro Vercelli (1929–32) on 10 November 1929, in a 3–1 away loss to Triestina, and scored his first Serie A goal on 13 April 1930, in a 6–0 home win over Triestina, once again. He spent most of his career playing for Ambrosiana-Inter (1936–41), alongside Giuseppe Meazza, and later Torino (1941–48), becoming a member of Ferruccio Novo's Grande Torino side; he also played for Napoli (1932–36), and Novara (1948–50), before retiring. In total, he scored 123 goals in 469 appearances in Serie A. In total, he won six Serie A titles: two with Inter, in 1937–38 and 1939–40, and four with Torino, in 1942–43, 1945–46, 1946–47, and 1947–48; he also won two Coppa Italia titles: 1 with Inter, in 1938–39, and 1 with Torino, in 1942–43.

== International career ==
At international level, Ferraris made 14 appearances for Italy between 1935 and 1947, scoring 3 goals. He made his international debut on 17 February 1935, in a 2–1 home win over France, and he later represented Italy at the 1938 FIFA World Cup, as the Italians went on to win the tournament. He scored his first goal for Italy, and his only goal of the tournament, in the second minute of their first round match of the World Cup against Norway, on 5 June, which ended in a 2–1 win; along with Bruno Mora's goal against Switzerland in the 1962 FIFA World Cup, this is Italy's fastest ever World Cup goal.

== Style of play ==
Capable of playing both as a striker or as a winger, Ferraris was known to be quick, efficient and intuitive. He was creative with his technical skills and had an eye for the goal. He was an accurate striker of the ball from close or mid range, and was also known for his positional sense, distribution, work-rate, professionalism, and longevity throughout his career.

== Career statistics ==
#	Date	Venue	Opponent	Score	Result	Competition
1	5 June 1938	Stade Vélodrome, Marseille, France	Norway	2–1	Win	1938 FIFA World Cup
2	5 April 1942	Stadio Luigi Ferraris, Genoa, Italy	(Independent State of Croatia) Croatia	4–0	Win	Friendly
3	19 April 1942	San Siro, Milan, Italy	Spain	4–0	Win	Friendly

== Honours ==
Ambrosiana-Inter

- Serie A: 1937–38, 1939–40
- Coppa Italia: 1938–39

Torino

- Serie A: 1942–43, 1945–46, 1946–47, 1947–48
- Coppa Italia: 1942–43

Italy

- FIFA World Cup: 1938
