= Valerio Bacigalupo =

Italian footballer (1924–1949)

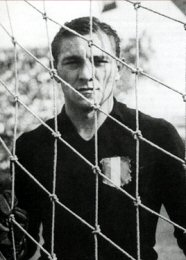
- Bacigalupo in the 1940s

Personal information
- Full name: Valerio Bacigalupo
- Date of birth: 12 February 1924
- Place of birth: Vado Ligure, Italy
- Date of death: 4 May 1949 (aged 25)
- Place of death: Superga, Italy
- Height: 1.76 m (5 ft 9 in)
- Position: Goalkeeper

Senior career*
Years	Team	Apps	(Gls)
1942–1943	Savona	20	(0)
1944	Genoa	20	(0)
1945–1949	Torino	137	(0)
Total		177	(0)

International career
1947–1949	Italy	5	(0)
- * Club domestic league appearances and goals

Valerio Bacigalupo (Italian pronunciation: [vaˈlɛːrjo batʃiɡaˈluːpo]; 12 February 1924 – 4 May 1949) was an Italian footballer who played as a goalkeeper.

Born in Vado Ligure, he began his career with Savona. After a brief spell at Genoa, he moved to Torino in 1945, where he won four Serie A titles. He also represented the Italy national team.

== Club career ==
Bacigalupo started his club career with his home province side Savona. After a brief spell at Genoa he moved to Torino where he won Serie A four times in a row.

== International career ==
Bacigalupo was called up in the Italy national team five times between 1947 and 1949, making his senior international debut in a 3–1 win over Czechoslovakia on 14 December 1947.

== Style of play ==
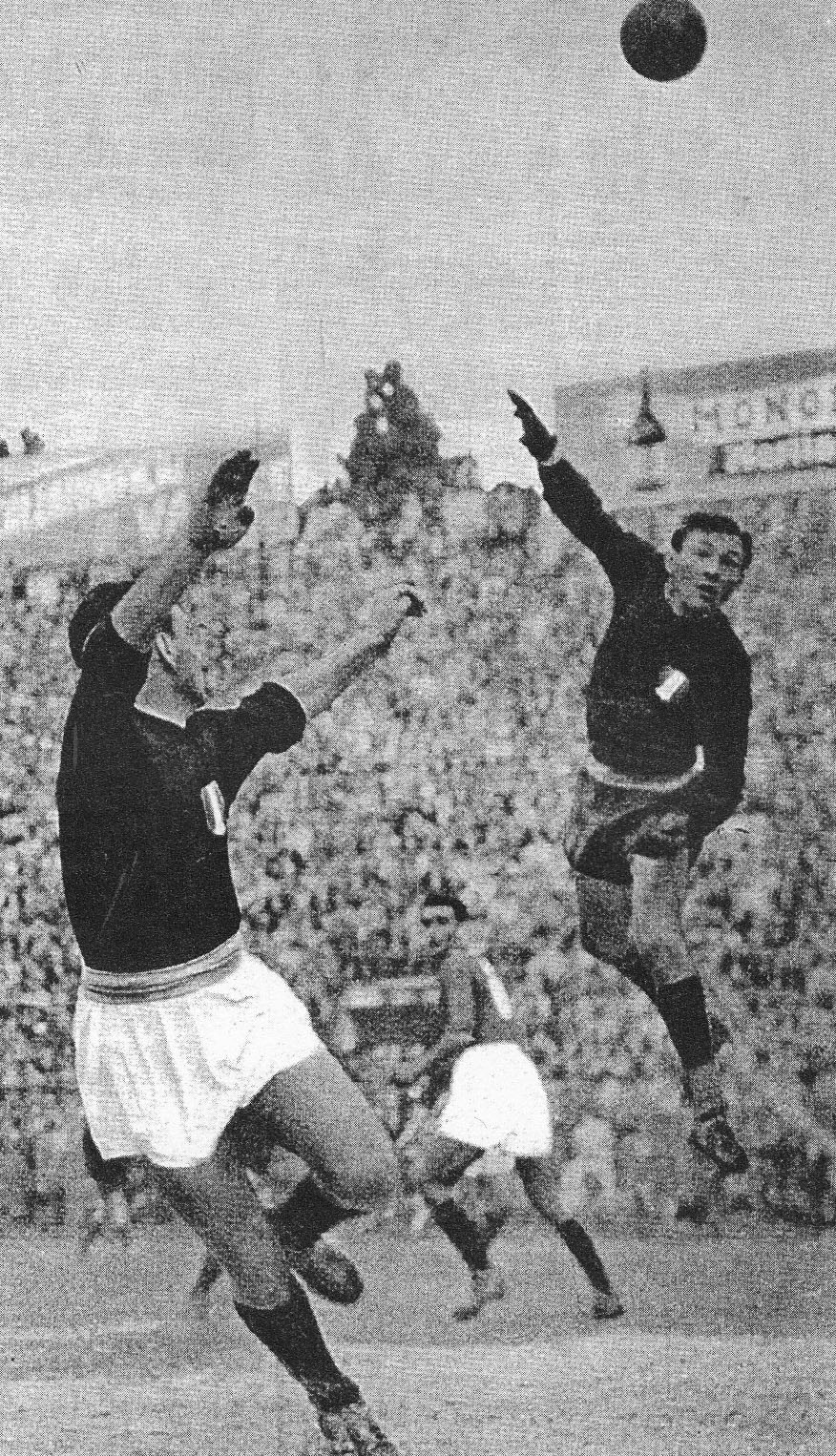
Bacigalupo in action

Regarded as one of the best goalkeepers of his generation, Bacigalupo revolutionised his position in Italy. He was known for his strong physique, reactions and positional sense, as well as his athletic diving saves. In addition to being an outstanding shot-stopper, he was considered a dominant goalkeeper, also known for his ability to come off his line to collect crosses.

== Personal life ==
Valerio Bacigalupo's older brother, Manlio Bacigalupo, also played professional football before the Second World War, also serving as a goalkeeper for Genoa and Torino. Valerio died in the Superga air disaster with most of the Grande Torino team, which also formed a large part in the Italy national team at the time, which was scheduled to take part at the 1950 FIFA World Cup.

== Legacy ==
After his death, the club where he started his career, Savona, named its ground Stadio Valerio Bacigalupo in his honour.

== Honours ==
Torino

- Serie A: 1945–46, 1946–47, 1947–48, 1948–49

Individual

- Torino FC Hall of Fame: 2014
