= Mario Rigamonti =

Italian footballer (1922–1949)

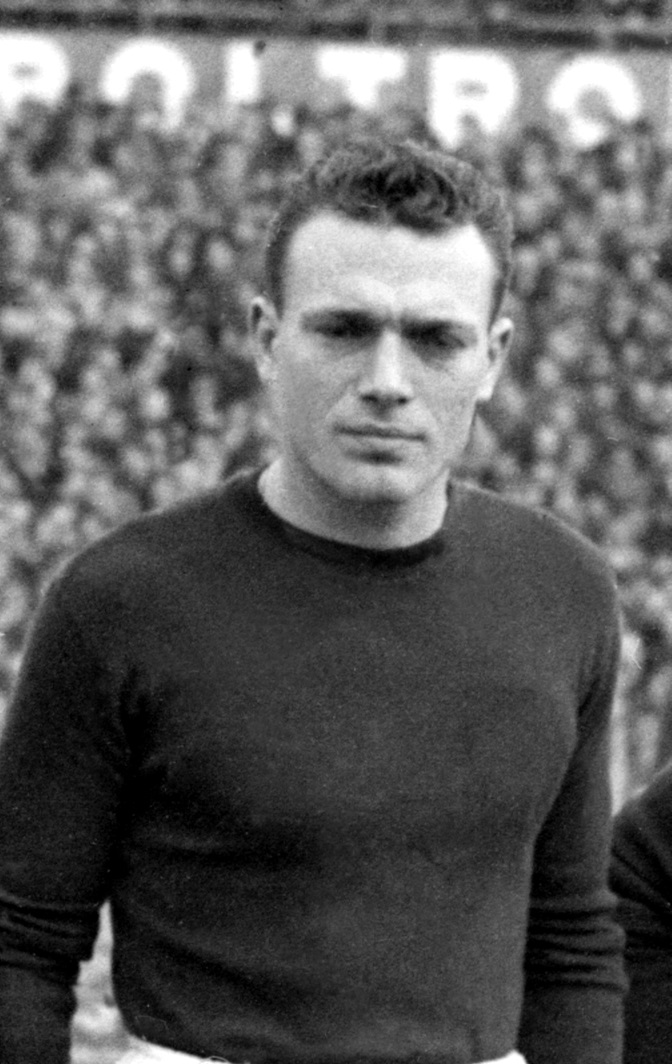

Personal information
- Date of birth: 17 December 1922
- Place of birth: Brescia, Kingdom of Italy
- Date of death: 4 May 1949 (aged 26)
- Place of death: Superga, Italy
- Height: 1.82 m (6 ft 0 in)
- Positions: Defender; defensive midfielder

Youth career
- –1941: Brescia
- 1941–1943: Torino

Senior career*
Years	Team	Apps	(Gls)
1941–1949	Torino	140	(1)
1944	→ Brescia (loan)	13	(4)
1945	→ Lecco (loan)		
Total		153+	(5+)

International career
1947–1949	Italy	3	(0)
- * Club domestic league appearances and goals

Mario Rigamonti (Italian pronunciation: [ˈmaːrjo riɡaˈmonti]; 17 December 1922 – 4 May 1949) was an Italian football player who played as a central defender for Torino and the Italy national team. He died in the Superga air disaster together with the whole Grande Torino team.

== Biography ==
Rigamonti was born in Brescia. Following his death in 1949, the Stadio Mario Rigamonti in Brescia, used by the local club Brescia Calcio, was opened in 1959 and was dedicated to him in his honour.

== Club career ==
Rigamonti played as a defender, more specifically as a centre-back in the WM formation, beginning his career in the youth system of his hometown club Brescia Calcio, later making his professional debut for the club in 1944. He was acquired by Torino F.C. in the summer of 1941, aged 19, but played for the club's first team only after World War II.

With Torino, Rigamonti made his Serie A debut in a 2–1 away loss to cross-city rivals Juventus on 14 October 1945; in total, he played 140 times for Torino and won four consecutive Serie A scudetti titles with the club.

== International career ==
Rigamonti was also capped three times for the Italy national team between 1947 and 1949. He made his international debut in a 3–2 win over Hungary on 11 May 1947.

== Death ==
Rigamonti died with most of the Grande Torino team in the Superga air disaster near Turin, on 4 May 1949.

== Style of play ==
Rigamonti was a tall, agile, physically strong, consistent and tenacious player, who was known for his skill and acrobatic ability in the air, courtesy of his elevation, as well as his fighting spirit, speed, anticipation, and competitive style of play. A versatile and hard-tackling player, he was capable of playing both in defence and in midfield, usually in a holding role.

== Honours ==
Torino

- Serie A: 1945–46, 1946–47, 1947–48, 1948–49
