= Luigi Griffanti =

Italian footballer

Personal information
- Date of birth: 20 April 1917
- Place of birth: Turbigo, Italy
- Date of death: 2 May 2006 (aged 89)
- Position: Goalkeeper

Senior career*
Years	Team	Apps	(Gls)
1935–1938	Vigevano	75	(0)
1938–1943	Fiorentina	139	(0)
1944	Torino	19	(0)
1945–1946	Fiorentina	19	(0)
1946–1950	Venezia	93	(0)
1950–1955	Carrarese	134	(0)

International career
1942	Italy	2	(0)
- * Club domestic league appearances and goals

Luigi Griffanti (Italian pronunciation: [luˈiːdʒi ɡrifˈfanti]; 20 April 1917 – 2 May 2006) was an Italian footballer. He played as a goalkeeper for Vigevano, Fiorentina, Torino, and Venezia in the 1930s and 1940s. He also earned two caps for the Italy national football team in 1942.
