= Silvio Piola =

Italian footballer (1913–1996)

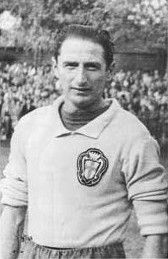
- Piola with Pro Vercelli in c. 1930

Personal information
- Date of birth: 29 September 1913
- Place of birth: Robbio, Italy
- Date of death: 4 October 1996 (aged 83)
- Place of death: Gattinara, Italy
- Height: 1.78 m (5 ft 10 in)
- Position: Striker

Youth career
- 1925–1928: Veloces 1925
- 1928–1929: Pro Vercelli

Senior career*
Years	Team	Apps	(Gls)
1929–1934	Pro Vercelli	127	(51)
1934–1943	Lazio	227	(143)
1943–1944	Torino	23	(27)
1944-1945	Novara	1+	(20)
1945–1947	Juventus	57	(26)
1947–1954	Novara	185	(86)
Total		620+	(353)

International career
1933–1935	Italy B	6	(11)
1935–1952	Italy	34	(30)

Managerial career
- 1953–1954: Italy (assistant)
- 1954–1956: Cagliari
- 1957: Cagliari
Medal record
Men's Football
Representing Italy
FIFA World Cup
Winner	1938 France
Central European International Cup
Winner	1933–1935
- * Club domestic league appearances and goals

Silvio Piola (Italian pronunciation: [ˈsilvjo ˈpjɔːla]; 29 September 1913 – 4 October 1996) was an Italian footballer who played as a striker. He is known as a highly prominent figure in the history of Italian football due to several records he set, and he is regarded as one of the greatest strikers of his generation, as well as one of the greatest Italian players of all time. Piola was part of the squad that won the 1933–35 Central European International Cup and the squad that won the 1938 FIFA World Cup with Italy, scoring two goals in the final, ending the tournament as the second-best player and the second-highest scorer.

Piola is third in the all-time goalscoring records of the Italy national team. He is also the highest goalscorer in Italian first league history, with 290 goals (274 in Serie A and 16 in Divisione Nazionale), and also in Serie A history. He played 566 Serie A games, putting him fourth on the all-time list for appearances in Italy's top flight. Piola is the only player to have the honour of being the all-time Serie A top scorer of three different teams (Pro Vercelli, Lazio and Novara) Piola is also the highest scoring Italian player in all competitions, with 364 goals (391 if his goals in the Divisione Nazionale and for the Italy B team are also included). Throughout his career, including friendlies, Piola scored 682 goals.

After his death, a pair of Italian stadiums were renamed after him: one in Novara in 1997 and another in Vercelli in 1998. In 2011, he was posthumously inducted into the Italian Football Hall of Fame.

== Club career ==
Piola began his career with Italian club Pro Vercelli, making his Serie A debut at age 16 against Bologna on 16 February 1930. Piola scored 13 goals in his first season. On 8 February 1931, he scored a hat-trick against Napoli; at 17 years and 132 days old, Piola set the record as the youngest player to score a hat trick in Europe's top five leagues, surpassing José Iraragorri of Atlético Madrid, who was 17 years and 337 days when he achieved the feat against Real Sociedad on 23 February 1930. As of the 2025 season, this record still stands. On 29 October 1933, Piola scored six goals, the joint-most goals scored in a single match in Serie A, in a 7–2 win over Fiorentina. He went on to score 51 goals in 127 appearances in Serie A for Pro Vercelli.

In 1934, he moved to Lazio, who had been on the receiving end of his first Serie A goal on 11 November 1930. He was to spend the next nine seasons there. Piola was the Serie A top scorer twice while at Lazio, in 1937 and 1943. Piola was Lazio's highest all-time leading goalscorer with 149 goals until it was surpassed in 2021 by Ciro Immobile. After leaving Lazio, he spent war-torn 1944 at Torino, where he scored an amazing 27 goals in just 23 games. Toward the end of the war, he joined Novara, where he reached the second position of the 1944–45 Lombardy Championship. Then, from 1945 to 1947, Piola played for Juventus, before moving back to Novara, where he stayed for seven more seasons.

During his final years with Novara, Piola became the oldest player in Serie A history to score two goals in a single league match, a feat which he managed on 1 February 1953, at the age of 39 years, 4 months and 2 days, against his former team Lazio; the record stood until 20 April 2016, when Francesco Totti scored a Serie A brace at the age of 39 years, 6 months and 23 days.

In his last season in 1953–54, Piola turned 40 years old on 29 September 1953, and then he scored one goal in three consecutive matches in November and December against Sampdoria, Palermo, and Inter Milan, thus becoming the first player to score a Serie A goal after his 40th birthday. He scored his fifth and last goal of the season on 7 February, in a 1–1 draw against AC Milan, and in doing so at the age of 40 years and 129 days, he became the oldest Serie A goalscorer in history, although his record has since been broken by both Alessandro Costacurta in 2007 and Zlatan Ibrahimović in 2023, who both scored a Serie A goal aged 41. With five goals, Piola is the joint-second highest 40-year-old goalscorer in Europe's top five leagues, alongside English League's Stanley Matthews, and Bundesliga's Claudio Pizarro, and only behind Ibrahimović, who scored eight in Serie A. To this day, Piola is still currently the highest all-time goalscorer in Serie A.

== International career ==
His first game for Italy came against Austria on 24 March 1935, when he also scored his first goals for the team in the form of a brace to help Italy defeat the hosts Austria 2–0 in the 1933–35 Central European International Cup. He was a World Cup winner in 1938, when he scored two of Italy's goals in the 4–2 victory over Hungary; he finished the tournament as the second highest scorer and was named the second-best player, also earning a place in the Team of the Tournament.

Piola went on to play 34 games for Italy and score 30 goals between 1935 and 1952, a tally that would surely have been greater if not for the interruption caused by World War II. He served as the national side's captain from 1940 until 1947. In 1939 he scored a goal with his hand to England 47 years before Diego Armando Maradona. His last international appearance was in 1952, when Italy drew 1–1 with England. Piola is currently Italy's third highest goalscorer of all-time, behind only Giuseppe Meazza, and Luigi Riva. He also co-holds, with Riva, the national team's record for most goals on opposition soil with 13.

== Style of play ==
Regarded as one of the greatest strikers of all time, Piola was widely renowned for his goalscoring ability throughout his career, and his eye for goal. He was considered to be a modern and well-rounded player during his time, as he used his physical attributes, intelligence, and control to play with his back to goal, and lay off the ball for teammates in order to provide them with assists. Piola's vision, work-rate, and technical ability, as well as his passing ability, made him a tactically versatile player, who was capable of playing in several positions, and he was deployed on the wing, in midfield, or as a creative advanced playmaker or second striker on occasion. Piola particularly excelled as a centre-forward; however, his speed, positional sense, offensive movement, and opportunism enabled him to lose his markers with his attacking runs and receive his team-mates' deliveries or pounce on loose balls in the area. Piola was also known for his powerful and accurate finishing ability with his head and both feet, from any position on the pitch, which made him a prolific goalscorer throughout his career. Due to his agility and athletic ability, Piola also excelled in the air, and he was capable of scoring spectacular acrobatic goals from volleys and bicycle kicks. Despite his talent and his reputation, he was occasionally accused of diving throughout his career. Unlike his legendary international team-mate, club rival, and friend Giuseppe Meazza, however, with whom he was often compared, Piola was much more reserved both on and off the pitch, and he preferred to score through efficiency and pragmatism rather than flamboyance. On top of his playing ability and prolific goalscoring, Piola also stood out for his longevity throughout his career.

== Career statistics ==
=== Club ===
Appearances and goals by club, season and competition
Club	Season	League			Coppa Italia		Mitropa Cup		Total	
Club	Season	Division	Apps	Goals	Apps	Goals	Apps	Goals	Apps	Goals
Pro Vercelli	1929–30	Serie A	4	0	—		—		4	0
Pro Vercelli	1930–31	Serie A	32	13	—		—		32	13
Pro Vercelli	1931–32	Serie A	31	12	—		—		31	12
Pro Vercelli	1932–33	Serie A	32	11	—		—		32	11
Pro Vercelli	1933–34	Serie A	28	15	—		—		28	15
Pro Vercelli	Total		127	51	0	0	0	0	127	51
Lazio	1934–35	Serie A	29	21	—		—		29	21
Lazio	1935–36	Serie A	27	19	2	2	—		29	21
Lazio	1936–37	Serie A	28	21	1	0	6	10	35	31
Lazio	1937–38	Serie A	28	15	0	0	—		28	15
Lazio	1938–39	Serie A	21	9	1	0	—		22	9
Lazio	1939–40	Serie A	23	9	2	1	—		25	10
Lazio	1940–41	Serie A	25	10	0	0	—		25	10
Lazio	1941–42	Serie A	24	18	2	3	—		26	21
Lazio	1942–43	Serie A	22	21	2	0	—		24	21
Lazio	Total		227	143	10	6	6	10	243	159
Torino	1944	Campionato Alta Italia	23	27	—		—		23	27
Novara	1944–45	Torneo Benefico Lombardo	1+	20	—		—		1+	20
Juventus	1945–46	Serie A Alta Italia	29	16	—		—		29	16
Juventus	1946–47	Serie A	28	10	—		—		28	10
Juventus	Total		57	26	0	0	0	0	57	26
Novara	1947–48	Serie B	30	16	—		—		30	16
Novara	1948–49	Serie A	36	15	—		—		36	15
Novara	1949–50	Serie A	17	4	—		—		17	4
Novara	1950–51	Serie A	37	19	—		—		37	19
Novara	1951–52	Serie A	31	18	—		—		31	18
Novara	1952–53	Serie A	25	9	—		—		25	9
Novara	1953–54	Serie A	9	5	—		—		9	5
Novara	Total		186+	106	0	0	0	0	186+	106
Career total			620+	333	10	6	6	10	620+	359

=== International ===
Appearances and goals by national team and year
National team	Year	Apps	Goals
Italy	1935	2	2
Italy	1936	5	2
Italy	1937	5	5
Italy	1938	7	9
Italy	1939	6	8
Italy	1940	4	1
Italy	1941	–	–
Italy	1942	1	1
Italy	1943	–	–
Italy	1944	–	–
Italy	1945	1	1
Italy	1946	1	1
Italy	1947	1	0
Italy	1948	–	–
Italy	1949	–	–
Italy	1950	–	–
Italy	1951	–	–
Italy	1952	1	0
Total		34	30

Scores and results list Italy's goal tally first, score column indicates score after each Piola goal.

List of international goals scored by Silvio Piola
No.	Date	Venue	Opponent	Score	Result	Competition	Ref.
1	24 March 1935	Praterstadion, Vienna, Austria	Austria	1–0	2–0	1933–35 Central European International Cup	
2	24 March 1935	Praterstadion, Vienna, Austria	Austria	2–0	2–0	1933–35 Central European International Cup	
3	25 October 1936	San Siro, Milan, Italy	Switzerland	2–1	4–2	1936–38 Central European International Cup	
4	25 October 1936	San Siro, Milan, Italy	Switzerland	3–1	4–2	1936–38 Central European International Cup	
5	23 May 1937	Letná Stadium, Prague, Czechoslovakia	Czechoslovakia	1–0	1–0	1936–38 Central European International Cup	
6	27 May 1937	Ullevaal Stadion, Oslo, Norway	Norway	2–0	3–1	Friendly	
7	27 May 1937	Ullevaal Stadion, Oslo, Norway	Norway	3–0	3–1	Friendly	
8	31 October 1937	Charmilles Stadium, Geneva, Switzerland	Switzerland	1–0	2–2	1936–38 Central European International Cup	
9	31 October 1937	Charmilles Stadium, Geneva, Switzerland	Switzerland	2–2	2–2	1936–38 Central European International Cup	
10	15 May 1938	San Siro, Milan, Italy	Belgium	4–1	6–1	Friendly	
11	15 May 1938	San Siro, Milan, Italy	Belgium	5–1	6–1	Friendly	
12	15 May 1938	San Siro, Milan, Italy	Belgium	6–1	6–1	Friendly	
13	22 May 1938	Stadio comunale Luigi Ferraris, Genoa, Italy	Yugoslavia	2–0	4–0	Friendly	
14	5 June 1938	Stade Vélodrome, Marseille, France	Norway	2–1	2–1	1938 FIFA World Cup	
15	12 June 1938	Stade olympique de Colombes, Colombes, France	France	2–1	3–1	1938 FIFA World Cup	
16	12 June 1938	Stade olympique de Colombes, Colombes, France	France	3–1	3–1	1938 FIFA World Cup	
17	19 June 1938	Stade olympique de Colombes, Colombes, France	Hungary	2–1	4–2	1938 FIFA World Cup final	
18	19 June 1938	Stade olympique de Colombes, Colombes, France	Hungary	4–2	4–2	1938 FIFA World Cup final	
19	26 March 1939	Stadio Giovanni Berta, Florence, Italy	Germany	1–0	3–2	Friendly	
20	26 March 1939	Stadio Giovanni Berta, Florence, Italy	Germany	3–1	3–2	Friendly	
21	13 May 1939	San Siro, Milan, Italy	England	2–1	2–2	Friendly	
22	4 June 1939	BSK Stadion, Belgrade, Yugoslavia	Yugoslavia	1–0	2–1	Friendly	
23	8 June 1939	Ferencváros Stadion, Budapest, Hungary	Hungary	1–0	3–1	Friendly	
24	20 July 1939	Helsinki Olympic Stadium, Helsinki, Finland	Finland	1–0	3–2	Friendly	
25	20 July 1939	Helsinki Olympic Stadium, Helsinki, Finland	Finland	2–1	3–2	Friendly	
26	20 July 1939	Helsinki Olympic Stadium, Helsinki, Finland	Finland	3–1	3–2	Friendly	
27	14 April 1940	Stadio Nazionale PNF, Rome, Italy	Romania	2–1	2–1	Friendly	
28	19 April 1942	San Siro, Milan, Italy	Spain	3–0	4–0	Friendly	
29	11 November 1945	Letzigrund, Zürich, Switzerland	Switzerland	1–0	4–4	Friendly	
30	1 December 1946	San Siro, Milan, Italy	Austria	3–1	3–2	Friendly	

== Honours ==
Lazio

- Serie A: runner-up 1936–37
- Central European Cup: runner-up 1937

Juventus

- Serie A: runner-up 1945–46, 1946–47

Novara

- Serie B: 1947–48
- Lombardy Championship: runner-up 1945

Italy

- FIFA World Cup: 1938
- Central European International Cup: 1933–35

Individual

- Serie A top goalscorer: 1936–37, 1942–43
- Lombardy Championship topscorer: 1944–1945
- Inducted into the Italian Football Hall of Fame: 2011 (posthumously)
- Inducted into the Walk of Fame of Italian sport: 2015

== See also ==
- List of footballers who achieved hat-trick records
- List of FIFA World Cup top goalscorers

Sporting positions
Preceded by Aldo Boffi	Serie A Top Scorer; 1942–43	Succeeded by Eusebio Castigliano
Preceded by Giuseppe Meazza	Italy captain 1940–1947	Succeeded by Valentino Mazzola
