= Cesare Presca =

Italian footballer (1921-1979)

Personal information
- Date of birth: 24 February 1921
- Place of birth: Trieste, Italy
- Date of death: 27 December 1979 (aged 58)
- Position: Midfielder

Senior career*
Years	Team	Apps	(Gls)
1940–1943	Triestina	6	(0)
1944–1945	San Giusto	11	(0)
1945–1949	Triestina	59	(1)
1949–1952	Venezia	73	(3)

International career
1948	Italy	1	(0)
- * Club domestic league appearances and goals

Cesare Presca (Italian pronunciation: [ˈtʃeːzare ˈprɛska, ˈtʃɛː-]; 24 February 1921 – 27 December 1979) was an Italian footballer who played as a midfielder. He competed in the men's tournament at the 1948 Summer Olympics.
