= Ezio Loik =

Italian footballer (1919–1949)

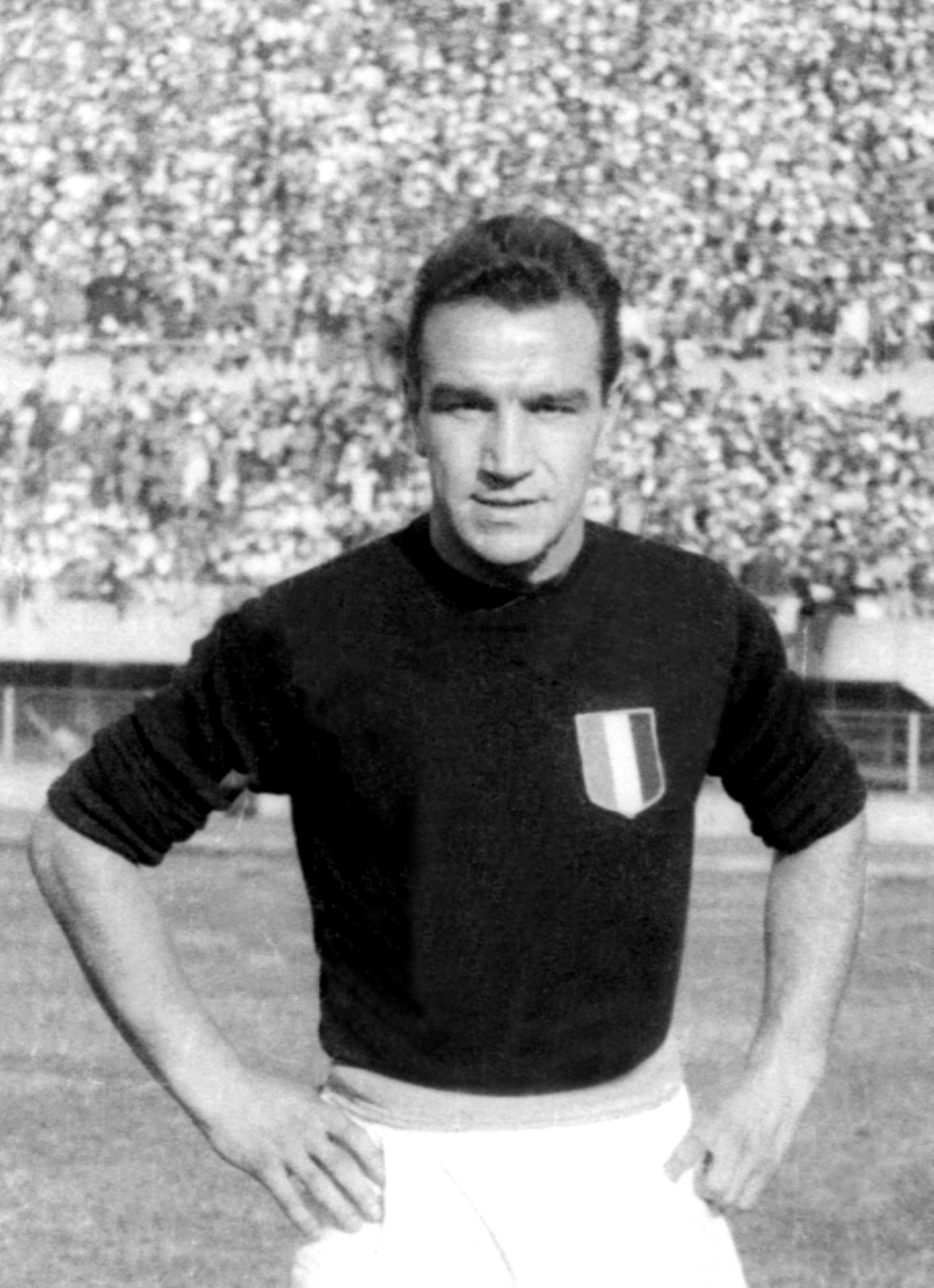

Personal information
- Date of birth: 26 September 1919
- Place of birth: Fiume, Italian Carnaro
- Date of death: 4 May 1949 (aged 29)
- Place of death: Superga, Italy
- Height: 1.78 m (5 ft 10 in)
- Position: Midfielder

Senior career*
Years	Team	Apps	(Gls)
1936–1937	Fiumana	41	(12)
1937–1940	A.C. Milan	53	(10)
1940–1942	Venezia	60	(13)
1942–1949	Torino	176	(70)
Total		330	(105)

International career
1942–1949	Italy	9	(4)
- * Club domestic league appearances and goals

Ezio Loik (Italian pronunciation: [ˈɛttsjo ˈlɔik]; 26 September 1919 – 4 May 1949) was an Italian footballer who played as a midfielder.

Born in Fiume, Loik began his career with Fiumana. He made his Serie A debut with A.C. Milan in 1937, and after three seasons, moved to Venezia. In Venice, he formed a notable partnership with Valentino Mazzola, and won the Coppa Italia in 1941. The following season, he moved to Torino, where he immediately won the domestic double and five consecutive Serie A titles.

At the international level, Loik represented the Italy national team. He died in the 1949 Superga air disaster, along with the entire Grande Torino team.

== Club career ==
Loik was born in Fiume (then part of Italy, now Rijeka, Croatia). He played as a midfielder, debuting for U.S. Fiumana aged 17 in the 1936–37 serie C tournament. After three seasons in Serie A with A.C. Milan, he moved to Venezia, where he obtained a third place and a Coppa Italia in 1941.

He moved to Torino in 1942, where he formed a notable midfield duo with Valentino Mazzola, who had also previously played for Venezia.

With the Grande Torino side, Loik won five consecutive Serie A scudetti and one further Coppa Italia (1942–43), until dying with most of the team in the Superga air disaster near Turin, on 4 May 1949, which also made up much of the Italy national team at the time.

== International career ==
Loik was also capped nine times for the Italy national team between 1942 and 1949, scoring four goals.

== Honours ==
Venezia

- Coppa Italia: 1940–41

Torino

- Serie A: 1942–43, 1945–46, 1946–47, 1947–48, 1948–49
- Coppa Italia: 1942–43

Individual

- NK Rijeka all time XI
