= Stadio Giuseppe Grezar =

Football stadium in Trieste, Italy

Coordinates: 45°37′26″N 13°47′39″E

- Stadio Littorio
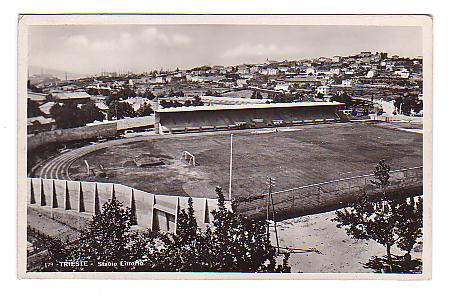
- Interactive map of Stadio Giuseppe Grezar
- Full name: Stadio Giuseppe Grezar
- Former names: Stadio Littorio (1932–1943); Stadio di Valmaura (1943–1967)
- Location: Trieste, Italy
- Owner: U.S. Triestina Calcio
- Operator: U.S. Triestina Calcio
- Capacity: 8,000
- Surface: Grass

Construction
- Opened: 1932

Tenant
- U.S. Triestina Calcio

Stadio Giuseppe Grezar is a multi-use stadium in Trieste, Italy. It was inaugurated in 1932 as the Stadio Littorio and was initially used as the stadium of U.S. Triestina Calcio matches. The capacity of the stadium was 8,000. It hosted the match between Czechoslovakia and Romania during the 1934 FIFA World Cup.

In 1943 it was renamed Stadio di Valmaura. It was renamed again in 1967, in honour of Giuseppe Grezar, a native son who was a member of the Grande Torino squad that perished in the Superga air disaster of 1949.

It was replaced by the nearby Stadio Nereo Rocco in 1992, but the Stadio Giuseppe Grezar remains open as a minor athletics venue.
