= Guglielmo Gabetto =

Italian footballer (1916–1949)

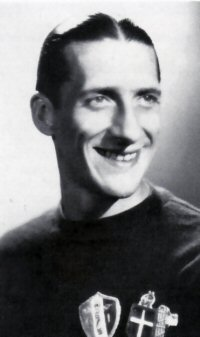
- Gabetto with Torino, c. 1943.

Personal information
- Date of birth: 24 February 1916
- Place of birth: Turin, Kingdom of Italy
- Date of death: 4 May 1949 (aged 33)
- Place of death: Superga, Italy
- Height: 1.74 m (5 ft 9 in)
- Position: Forward

Senior career*
Years	Team	Apps	(Gls)
1934–1941	Juventus	164	(87)
1941–1949	Torino	219	(122)
Total		383	(209)

International career
1942–1948	Italy	6	(5)
- * Club domestic league appearances and goals

Guglielmo Gabetto (Italian pronunciation: [ɡuʎˈʎɛlmo ɡaˈbetto]; 24 February 1916 – 4 May 1949) was an Italian footballer who played as a forward.

Aside from goalkeeper Alfredo Bodoira, he is the only player to win the Italian championship with both Torino and cross-city rivals Juventus.

== Biography ==
Gabetto was born in Turin, Italy, in the Aurora district of the Piedmont capital.

He died in a commercial aeroplane tragedy as one of the victims of the 1949 Superga air disaster, when a plane carrying almost the entire Torino Football Club squad, the Grande Torino, crashed into the Superga hill near Turin. He was buried in the Cimitero Monumentale in Turin.

== Club career ==
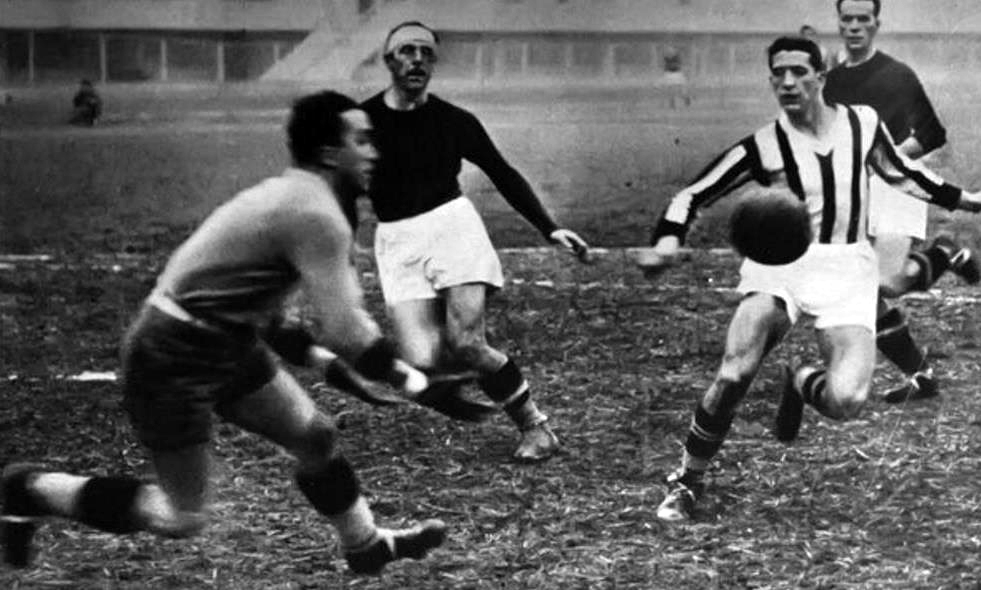
Gabetto (right) playing for Juventus between late 1930s and early 1940s

Gabetto began his career with Juventus in 1934, scoring 102 goals for the club in seven seasons, 85 of which came in the league; he is still today one of the club's best goalscorers.

In 1941 he was acquired by local rivals Torino, for a notable sum of 330,000 Lit.; the same season, Torino bought two other Juventus players: Felice Borel, and Alfredo Bodoira. He formed a notable attack alongside Ezio Loik and Valentino Mazzola, becoming a key player in the Grande Torino side which dominated Italy, winning five consecutive Serie A titles. Only he and his teammate Piero Operto were originally from Turin. In total, he scored 127 goals for Torino in 225 matches.

== International career ==
Gabetto also made six appearances for the Italy national team between 1942 and 1948, scoring five goals, the first of which came on his debut against Croatia on 5 April 1942.

== Style of play ==
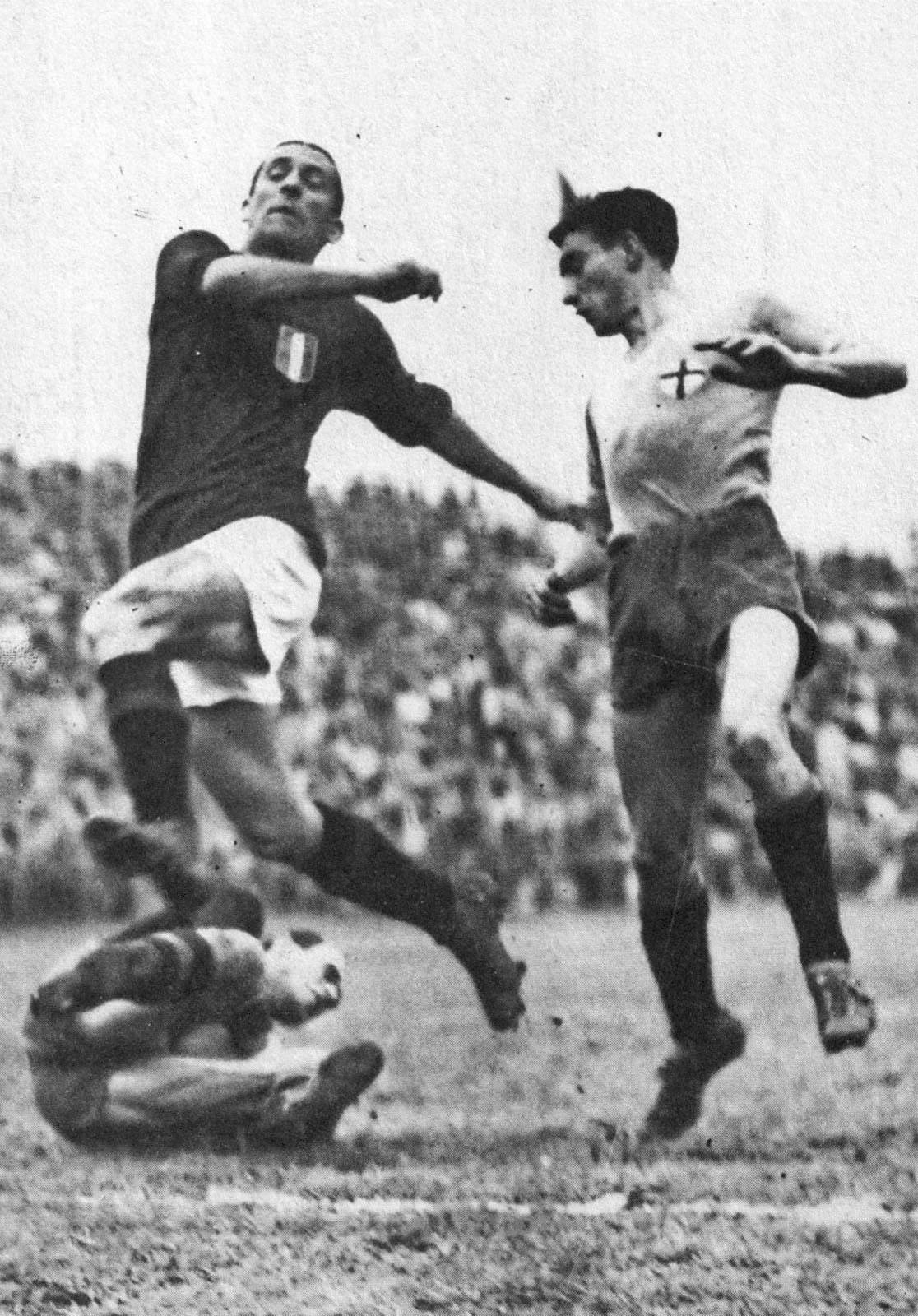
Gabetto in action with the Grande Torino in 1948

Regarded as one of the best Italian players of his generation, and one of Italy's greatest-ever strikers, Gabetto was a complete, creative, fast, and technically gifted forward, who was known for his flair, coordination, speed, and dribbling skills. Nicknamed il barone ("the baron," in Italian), he usually played as a centre-forward, and possessed "acrobatic" characteristics that apparently allowed him to produce "near-impossible" goals. The precision and the power of his kicking made him a highly prolific goal-scorer, which made him an idol of the Torino fans, who affectionately called him "Gabe."

== Honours ==
Juventus

- Serie A: 1934–35
- Coppa Italia: 1937–38

Torino

- Serie A: 1942–43, 1945–46, 1946–47, 1947–48, 1948–49
- Coppa Italia: 1942–43

Individual

- Juventus FC Hall of Fame: 2025
