= Stadio Arturo Collana =

Football stadium in Naples, Italy

Coordinates: 40°50′47″N 14°13′27″E

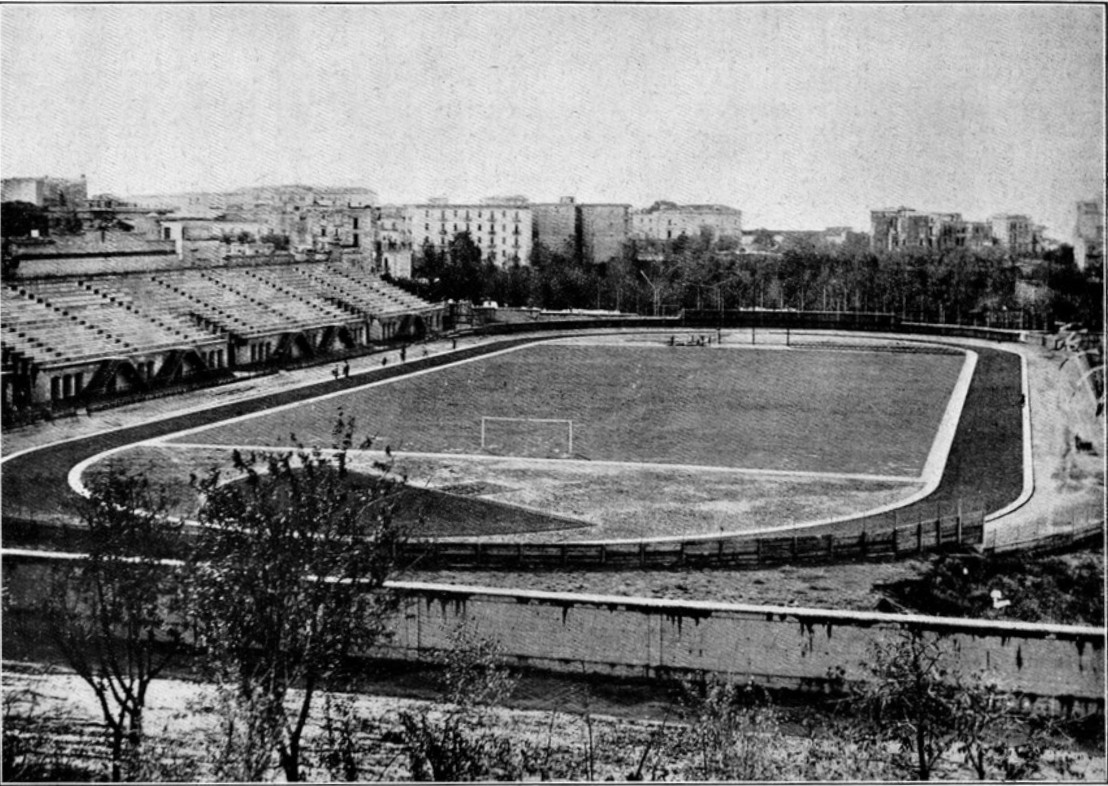
- Stadio Littorio Napoli in 1929
- Interactive map of Stadio Arturo Collana
- Former names: Stadio XXVIII Ottobre
- Location: Naples, Campania, Italy
- Owner: Region Campania
- Capacity: 12,000
- Surface: Grass
- Field size: 101 m × 64 m (331 ft × 210 ft)

Construction
- Groundbreaking: 1925
- Opened: 1929
- Renovated: 1975
- Architect: Amedeo D'Albora

Tenant
- SSD Napoli Femminile

Stadio Arturo Collana is a football stadium in Naples, Italy; it is located in the Vomero area of the city. The stadium was built in the latter part of the 1920s, originally under the name Stadio XXVIII Ottobre.

== History ==
The stadium was named after Arturo Collana, a sports journalist among the founding members.

S.S.C. Napoli were official tenants of the stadium during the 1933–34 season onwards, as their stadium Stadio Giorgio Ascarelli was having problems. After the World War II it was for a time renamed Stadio della Liberazione; Napoli would continue using it until moving to their current home of Stadio San Paolo in 1959.

For a period of time starting in the 1960s a club from Naples called Internapoli played at the stadium, but they have since moved. It was completely restructured in 1970 and has become a multi-use sports center where athletics, football and rugby games are carried out.
