= 1942–43 Serie A =

42nd season of top-tier Italian football

Serie A
- Season: 1942–43
- Champions: Torino; 2nd title
- Matches: 240
- Goals: 742 (3.09 per match)
- Top goalscorer: Silvio Piola (21 goals)

The 1942–43 Serie A was the forty-third edition of the Italian Football Championship and its fourteenth since 1929 rebranding to create Serie A. It was the twentieth season from which the Italian Football Champions adorned their team jerseys in the subsequent season with a Scudetto. Torino F.C. were champions for the second time in their history. This was their second scudetto since the scudetto started being awarded in 1924 and their first win contested as Serie A. This was their first of five consecutive Italian Football Championship wins, punctuated by a two-year break due to World War II. It was the last Serie A for three years due to the regional format used in the first season of the Italian championship immediately post-war in 1945–46.

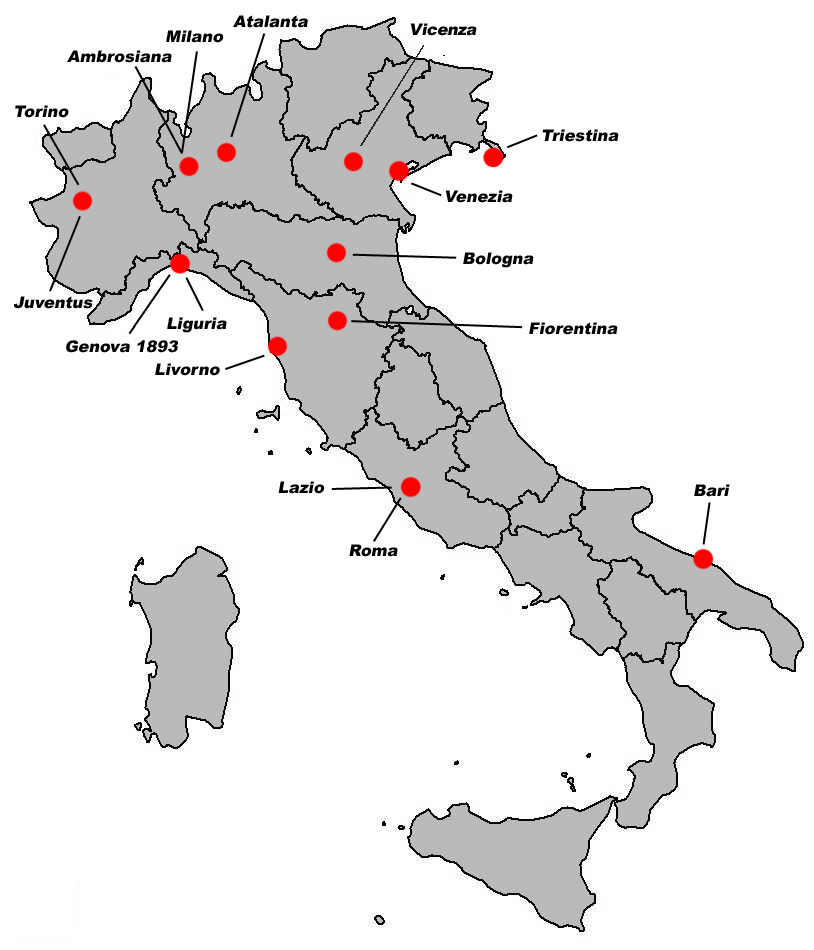
Serie A 1942-43 teams distribution

== Teams ==
Bari and Vicenza had been promoted from Serie B.

== Events ==
Goal average was abolished.

== Final classification ==
Pos	Team	Pld	W	D	L	GF	GA	GD	Pts	Qualification or relegation
1	Torino (C)	30	20	4	6	68	31	+37	44	
2	Livorno	30	18	7	5	52	34	+18	43	
3	Juventus Cisitalia	30	16	5	9	75	55	+20	37	
4	Ambrosiana-Inter	30	15	4	11	53	38	+15	34	
5	Genova 1893	30	14	5	11	59	53	+6	33	
6	Bologna	30	12	5	13	53	39	+14	29	
6	Fiorentina	30	12	5	13	55	61	−6	29	
6	Milano	30	10	9	11	39	44	−5	29	
9	Lazio	30	10	8	12	56	59	−3	28	
9	Atalanta	30	11	6	13	34	44	−10	28	
9	Roma	30	12	4	14	36	50	−14	28	
12	Vicenza	30	8	9	13	36	44	−8	25	
13	Triestina	30	5	14	11	32	40	−8	24	Relegation tie-breaker
14	Venezia	30	8	8	14	34	46	−12	24	Relegation tie-breaker
15	Bari (T)	30	7	10	13	24	38	−14	24	Relegation tie-breaker
16	Liguria (T)	30	7	7	16	36	66	−30	21	1943–44 Serie B never played

Source: Relegations to canceled 1943–44 tournaments would have been canceled themselves after the war.
(C) Champions; (T) Qualified, but not yet for the particular phase indicated

== Results ==
Home \ Away	AMB	ATA	BAR	BOL	FIO	GEN	JUV	LAZ	LIG	LIV	MIL	ROM	TOR	TRI	VEN	VIC
Ambrosiana-Inter		1–0	0–0	1–0	4–0	3–0	3–1	4–1	5–1	0–1	3–1	0–2	1–0	1–0	1–4	1–2
Atalanta	2–5		2–0	1–0	1–0	3–1	0–2	2–0	2–0	0–2	0–0	2–1	1–0	2–2	1–2	2–2
Bari	1–0	0–0		0–1	4–2	0–0	2–3	2–1	2–0	1–1	2–0	2–2	0–1	1–0	2–1	0–0
Bologna	3–1	2–0	4–0		3–1	3–1	2–2	4–0	3–3	1–2	3–0	4–2	1–2	2–2	0–2	1–2
Fiorentina	2–0	2–0	1–0	0–1		3–2	3–4	1–1	5–1	4–3	3–0	3–0	2–3	2–2	2–1	4–2
Genova 1893	1–0	1–0	3–2	3–1	0–2		1–2	6–5	3–0	5–2	4–2	0–2	3–3	1–1	5–1	6–1
Juventus	4–2	5–1	5–0	3–1	5–2	3–2		2–4	4–1	3–0	1–1	1–2	2–5	6–2	5–2	2–6
Lazio	3–1	3–2	0–0	2–1	3–3	1–1	5–3		5–1	0–1	4–2	3–1	2–3	3–1	1–1	2–1
Liguria	1–1	3–0	1–0	1–7	2–2	1–2	1–0	2–0		1–2	2–2	3–0	2–3	1–1	1–0	3–1
Livorno	4–2	1–1	1–1	1–0	4–1	3–1	0–3	4–2	3–1		3–1	2–0	0–0	0–0	2–1	2–0
Milano	0–3	0–1	3–1	3–2	1–3	0–0	2–0	4–1	0–0	1–1		4–1	1–0	2–0	1–2	1–1
Roma	1–3	2–1	1–0	1–1	1–0	2–3	1–2	1–0	5–1	1–0	1–1		0–4	1–2	2–1	1–0
Torino	1–3	4–2	3–0	2–1	5–0	3–1	2–0	2–2	3–0	1–2	0–1	4–0		4–1	3–1	0–0
Triestina	0–0	0–1	1–1	0–0	3–0	0–1	1–1	0–0	3–1	1–1	0–1	2–0	2–3		1–1	2–0
Venezia	0–2	1–1	0–0	1–0	2–2	4–1	1–1	2–1	1–0	0–1	1–3	0–0	0–3	1–1		0–1
Vicenza	2–2	2–3	1–0	0–1	3–0	0–1	0–0	1–1	1–1	1–3	1–1	1–2	0–1	2–1	2–0	

Source: Almanacco Illustrato del Calcio - La Storia 1898-2004, Panini Edizioni, Modena, September 2005 (in Italian)
Legend: Blue = home team win; Yellow = draw; Red = away team win.

== Relegation tie-breaker ==
Played in Rome, Florence and Modena.

Team 1	Score	Team 2
Bari	1-1	Venezia
Triestina	2-0	Venezia
Bari	2-3	Triestina

Triestina remained in Serie A. A second round was needed and played in Bologna.

Team 1	Score	Team 2
Bari	0-3	Venezia

Bari relegated to Serie B.

== Top goalscorers ==
Rank	Player	Club	Goals
1	(Italy) Silvio Piola	Lazio	21
2	(Italy) Guglielmo Trevisan	Genova 1893	19
3	(Italy) Vittorio Sentimenti	Juventus	17
4	(Albania) Riza Lushta	Juventus	16
5	(Italy) Amedeo Amadei	Roma	14
5	(Italy) Guglielmo Gabetto	Torino	14
5	(Italy) Giovanni Gaddoni	Ambrosiana-Inter	14
8	(Socialist Federal Republic of Yugoslavia) Frane Matošić	Bologna	13
9	(Italy) Pietro Ferraris	Torino	12
9	(Italy) Adriano Gè	Atalanta	12
9	(Italy) Alberto Marchetti	Vicenza	12
9	(Italy) Teresio Piana	Livorno	12

== References and sources ==
- Almanacco Illustrato del Calcio - La Storia 1898-2004, Panini Edizioni, Modena, September 2005
