= 1947–48 Serie A =

45th season of top-tier Italian football

Serie A
- Season: 1947–48
- Champions: Torino; 5th title
- Relegated: Napoli; Salernitana; Alessandria; Vicenza
- Matches: 420
- Goals: 1,200 (2.86 per match)
- Top goalscorer: Giampiero Boniperti (27 goals)

The 1947–48 Serie A was the forty-sixth edition of the Italian Football Championship. It was the fifteenth Italian Football Championship branded Serie A, since Serie A was launched in 1929. This was the twenty-second season from which the Italian Football Champions adorned their team jerseys in the subsequent season with a Scudetto. Torino were champions for the fifth time in their history. This was their fifth scudetto since the scudetto started being awarded in 1924 and their third win contested as Serie A. This was their fourth of five consecutive Italian Football Championship wins, punctuated by a two-year break due to World War II.

== Teams ==
Pro Patria for Northern Italy, Lucchese for Central Italy and Salernitana for Southern Italy had been promoted from Serie B.

Serie A 1947-48 team distribution

== Events ==
Triestina participated as guest.

== Final classification ==
Pos	Team	Pld	W	D	L	GF	GA	GD	Pts	Qualification or relegation
1	Torino (C)	40	29	7	4	125	33	+92	65	
2	Milan	40	21	7	12	76	48	+28	49	
3	Juventus	40	19	11	10	74	48	+26	49	
4	Triestina (G)	40	17	15	8	51	42	+9	49	
5	Atalanta	40	16	12	12	48	41	+7	44	
5	Modena	40	16	12	12	45	40	+5	44	
7	Fiorentina	40	18	5	17	49	55	−6	41	
8	Pro Patria	40	17	6	17	65	66	−1	40	
8	Bologna	40	14	12	14	51	52	−1	40	
10	Lazio	40	13	13	14	54	55	−1	39	
11	Bari	40	14	10	16	38	60	−22	38	
12	Internazionale	40	16	5	19	67	60	+7	37	
12	Genoa	40	15	7	18	68	65	+3	37	
14	Sampdoria	40	13	10	17	68	63	+5	36	
14	Livorno	40	11	14	15	45	62	−17	36	
14	Lucchese	40	12	12	16	46	82	−36	36	
17	Roma	40	13	9	18	54	69	−15	35	
18	Napoli (R)	40	12	10	18	50	46	+4	34	Relegation to Serie B
19	Salernitana (R)	40	13	8	19	46	63	−17	34	Relegation to Serie B
20	Alessandria (R)	40	11	9	20	49	75	−26	31	Relegation to Serie B
21	Vicenza (R)	40	10	6	24	31	75	−44	26	Relegation to Serie B

Source: Panini
(C) Champions; (G) Guests; (R) Relegated

== Results ==
Home \ Away	ALE	ATA	BAR	BOL	FIO	GEN	INT	JUV	LAZ	LIV	LUC	MIL	MOD	NAP	PPA	ROM	SAL	SAM	TOR	TRI	VIC
Alessandria		0–1	1–0	0–2	1–0	0–0	1–0	1–3	2–2	1–0	4–2	2–2	0–0	2–2	2–5	4–0	3–0	1–1	2–2	1–1	4–0
Atalanta	0–0		3–1	1–0	1–0	2–1	1–1	0–0	5–0	3–1	5–0	1–0	2–1	2–1	2–2	1–1	0–0	2–0	1–0	3–1	2–0
Bari	1–0	3–0		1–1	1–0	0–2	2–1	2–1	2–1	3–0	1–0	1–0	1–1	2–1	1–3	2–1	0–0	0–2	1–0	0–0	1–0
Bologna	3–2	3–1	0–0		1–0	4–2	1–0	1–1	0–0	4–1	2–2	1–0	3–3	0–1	2–2	2–2	4–0	1–0	1–0	0–0	2–1
Fiorentina	2–1	2–0	2–0	1–1		4–0	1–0	2–4	4–1	1–1	2–0	2–1	4–2	1–0	1–0	1–0	1–0	4–3	1–2	2–1	1–2
Genoa	3–0	1–1	2–2	7–2	1–2		2–1	2–3	3–1	0–0	1–1	3–1	2–0	3–2	4–1	2–4	3–1	2–1	1–2	2–1	4–0
Internazionale	6–0	0–3	4–1	2–1	4–1	1–0		4–2	1–1	1–0	6–0	0–2	1–1	1–0	4–0	3–2	2–1	2–4	0–1	1–1	2–0
Juventus	6–1	1–0	6–0	0–1	3–0	2–1	2–0		1–1	6–1	1–1	2–1	0–1	1–3	0–4	3–0	2–0	4–1	1–1	0–1	6–0
Lazio	1–0	1–1	3–3	2–1	5–0	3–0	1–0	0–0		4–1	1–0	1–2	1–0	0–0	1–0	0–1	3–1	3–3	0–0	3–1	2–1
Livorno	1–0	2–0	1–1	2–0	2–2	1–1	3–2	0–0	0–0		2–0	1–1	1–1	1–0	2–2	2–1	3–0	1–1	1–3	2–1	2–0
Lucchese	2–1	1–1	1–0	1–0	1–0	0–3	1–1	2–2	2–1	2–2		0–0	2–0	2–1	2–0	2–2	1–0	2–1	2–2	1–1	1–1
Milan	1–3	1–0	8–1	2–1	2–1	2–0	3–2	5–0	5–2	2–0	1–2		2–1	3–0	4–2	2–2	2–0	1–0	3–2	1–1	3–2
Modena	1–0	2–0	2–0	1–1	1–1	3–2	2–0	0–1	2–0	3–0	3–0	1–0		1–0	1–0	3–0	1–0	1–1	0–3	0–0	2–0
Napoli	1–2	1–1	1–0	1–1	3–0	3–0	3–0	0–0	0–0	3–0	5–0	0–2	5–1		1–0	1–2	0–0	3–1	0–0	1–0	1–1
Pro Patria	3–2	2–0	2–0	1–0	1–0	3–2	2–0	2–3	1–1	2–0	5–1	2–3	0–1	3–1		2–2	1–0	1–0	0–2	3–1	2–0
Roma	4–1	4–1	0–0	0–2	0–1	3–0	2–3	2–3	0–2	1–0	4–2	1–4	0–0	1–0	1–1		1–0	2–0	1–7	1–3	2–0
Salernitana	1–0	0–0	1–0	2–0	2–0	4–1	1–0	0–0	2–0	2–4	5–2	4–3	1–0	3–3	5–0	0–1		2–1	1–4	2–2	1–0
Sampdoria	4–0	1–0	0–1	2–0	0–0	1–1	1–4	5–2	2–1	1–1	4–1	0–0	0–0	2–1	5–3	2–1	6–3		0–1	2–2	6–1
Torino	10–0	4–0	5–1	5–1	5–0	2–1	5–0	1–1	4–3	5–2	6–0	2–1	5–2	4–0	4–1	4–1	7–1	3–2		6–0	2–0
Triestina	2–1	1–1	1–1	1–0	1–0	1–0	4–3	1–0	2–1	1–1	4–1	2–0	1–0	1–0	4–1	2–0	0–0	2–0	0–0		1–0
Vicenza	0–3	1–0	3–1	2–1	1–2	0–3	1–4	0–1	2–1	1–0	1–3	0–0	0–0	2–1	1–0	1–1	2–0	3–2	0–4	1–1	

Source: Almanacco Illustrato del Calcio - La Storia 1898-2004, Panini Edizioni, Modena, September 2005 (in Italian)
Legend: Blue = home team win; Yellow = draw; Red = away team win.

== Top goalscorers ==
Rank	Player	Club	Goals
1	(Italy) Giampiero Boniperti	Juventus	27
2	(Italy) Valentino Mazzola	Torino	25
3	(Italy) Guglielmo Gabetto	Torino	23
4	(Italy) Adriano Bassetto	Sampdoria	21
5	(Italy) Amedeo Amadei	Roma	19
5	(Italy) Ugo Conti	Lucchese	19
7	(Italy) Francesco Pernigo	Modena	18
7	(Italy) Angelo Turconi	Pro Patria	18
7	(Italy) Riccardo Dalla Torre	Genoa	18
10	(Italy) Ettore Puricelli	Milan	17
10	(Italy) Romano Penzo	Lazio	17
12	(Italy) Ezio Loik	Torino	16
12	(Italy) Renato Brighenti	Genoa	16
12	(Italy) Bruno Quaresima	Internazionale	16
15	(Italy) Alberto Galassi	Fiorentina	15
15	(Italy) Riccardo Carapellese	Milan	15
15	(Italy) Guido Tieghi	Livorno	15

== References and sources ==
- Almanacco Illustrato del Calcio - La Storia 1898-2004, Panini Edizioni, Modena, September 2005
