= 1945–46 Italian Football Championship =

43rd season of top-tier Italian football

Divisione Nazionale
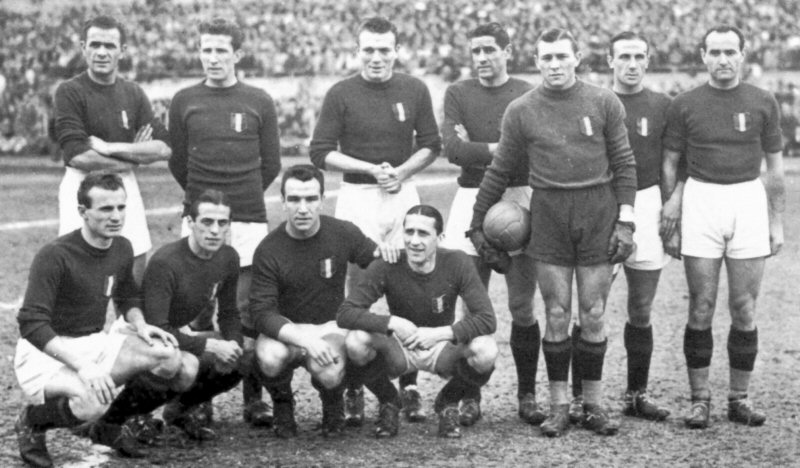
- 1945–46 Torino team
- Season: 1945–46
- Champions: Torino; 3rd title
- Matches: 350
- Goals: 889 (2.54 per match)
- Top goalscorer: Guglielmo Gabetto (22 goals)

The 1945–46 Italian Football Championship officially known as 1945–46 Divisione Nazionale, was the forty-fourth edition of the Italian Football Championship. It was the twenty-first season from which the Italian Football Champions adorned their team jerseys in the subsequent season with a Scudetto. 1945-46 was the first Italian Football Championship held after the ravages of World War II. Hence the authorities resurrected a one season return to the Divisione Nazionale two region set up, instead of the nationwide Serie A brand introduced in 1929.

Torino FC were champions for the third time in their history. This was their third scudetto since the scudetto started being awarded in 1924 and their second 'non-Serie A' style win. This was their second of five consecutive Italian Football Championship wins, punctuated by a two-year break due to World War II.

== Northern Italy Serie A Championship ==
Campionato Alta Italia Serie A

Campionato Alta Italia Serie A 1945-46 team distribution

Just after the Allied disbandment of the fascist Higher Directory, the major clubs from US-occupied Northern Italy replaced it by a provisional football league, the High Italy League (Lega Alta Italia), which organized the local section of the Serie A.

=== Teams ===
Modena and Brescia had been promoted from Serie B.

Sampierdarenese and Andrea Doria reborn from Liguria and both joined this championship as FIGC special guests to repair their forced fusion by the fascist government in 1927.

=== Classification ===
Pos	Team	Pld	W	D	L	GF	GA	GD	Pts	Qualification
1	Torino (A)	26	19	4	3	65	18	+47	42	National final round
2	Internazionale (A)	26	17	5	4	52	21	+31	39	National final round
3	Juventus (A)	26	13	9	4	52	23	+29	35	National final round
4	Milan (A)	26	12	6	8	38	36	+2	30	Qualified after tie-breaker
5	Brescia	26	12	6	8	38	33	+5	30	Tie-breaker
6	Modena	26	8	10	8	24	22	+2	26	
6	Bologna	26	11	4	11	30	33	−3	26	
8	Triestina	26	8	7	11	23	32	−9	23	
9	Atalanta	26	7	7	12	21	28	−7	21	
9	Andrea Doria (G)	26	7	7	12	25	35	−10	21	Disbanded (Note: Sampierdarenese merged again with Andrea Doria at the end of the season, creating new UC Sampdoria.)
11	Vicenza	26	8	4	14	28	38	−10	20	
12	Genoa	26	6	7	13	21	46	−25	19	
13	Venezia	26	4	9	13	19	37	−18	17	
14	Sampierdarenese (Note: AC Sampierdarenese was called AC Liguria before the war.)	26	5	5	16	19	53	−34	15	

Source: Panini
(A) Advance to a further round; (G) Guest

=== Tie-breaker ===
Played in Bologna on April 21.

Team 1	Score	Team 2
Brescia	1–1	Milan

Repetition

Played in Modena on April 24.

Team 1	Score	Team 2
Brescia	1–2	Milan

=== Results ===
Home \ Away	ADO	ATA	BOL	BRE	GEN	INT	JUV	MIL	MOD	SAM	TOR	TRI	VEN	VIC
Andrea Doria		1–0	0–0	1–1	0–1	1–1	1–1	1–2	1–1	0–1	2–3	0–0	2–0	3–2
Atalanta	0–3		0–1	0–0	2–2	2–1	1–1	0–2	0–1	3–0	1–0	2–1	1–0	2–2
Bologna	1–0	2–0		0–0	4–0	1–3	2–1	1–2	2–2	3–2	0–2	1–0	3–0	2–1
Brescia	2–0	1–1	2–1		3–1	1–2	2–1	2–0	1–0	1–0	1–3	1–1	3–1	4–1
Genoa	0–3	1–0	3–0	2–3		1–2	2–1	1–0	0–0	0–2	0–1	0–1	0–0	2–0
Internazionale	2–0	1–0	1–0	4–1	9–1		2–2	2–0	2–0	2–0	1–1	1–2	2–1	4–2
Juventus	6–1	2–0	1–0	3–1	4–1	0–0		2–2	1–0	6–0	2–1	1–1	5–0	2–1
Milan	1–2	2–1	2–2	3–1	1–0	1–3	1–1		1–0	3–0	2–3	2–0	2–1	2–4
Modena	1–0	0–2	2–0	2–1	1–1	0–0	0–0	1–1		2–0	0–3	5–1	0–0	2–0
Sampierdarenese	1–0	1–3	0–2	1–2	1–1	1–3	2–2	1–2	0–0		0–5	0–6	1–1	1–0
Torino	5–0	2–0	4–0	2–2	6–0	1–0	1–0	4–0	1–1	2–1		4–0	3–1	4–0
Triestina	0–1	0–0	1–0	1–0	2–1	1–3	0–3	1–2	1–0	0–1	1–1		0–0	0–2
Venezia	2–2	0–0	1–2	1–2	0–0	0–1	0–2	0–0	2–3	3–1	2–1	1–1		1–0
Vicenza	1–0	1–0	3–0	1–0	0–0	1–0	1–2	2–2	1–0	1–1	1–2	0–1	0–1	

Updated to match(es) played on unknown. Source: Almanacco Illustrato del Calcio - La Storia 1898-2004, Panini Edizioni, Modena, September 2005 (in Italian)
Legend: Blue = home team win; Yellow = draw; Red = away team win.

== Central and Southern Italy Serie A-B Championship ==
Serie A-B Sud
- Champions: Napoli (promoted)

Campionato Centro-Sud Serie A-B

Serie A-B Centro-Sud 1945-46 team distribution

=== Teams ===
Bari had been relegated to Serie B but the FIGC annulled the move for wartime reasons.

=== Serie B guests ===
Palermo had been relegated to Serie C but the FIGC annulled the move for wartime reasons.

Salernitana had been promoted from Serie C.

Pisa was granted of a special break for its huge wartime damages. MATER had been disbanded.

=== Classification ===
Pos	Team	Pld	W	D	L	GF	GA	GD	Pts	Qualification
1	Napoli (G, P, A)	20	11	6	3	28	10	+18	28	Promotion to Serie A
1	Bari (A)	20	13	2	5	31	21	+10	28	National final round
3	Roma (A)	20	10	7	3	28	17	+11	27	National final round
4	Pro Livorno (A)	20	10	6	4	30	15	+15	26	National final round
5	Fiorentina	20	10	3	7	32	16	+16	23	
6	Pescara (G)	20	6	6	8	27	26	+1	18	
7	Lazio	20	6	5	9	19	19	0	17	
7	Palermo (G)	20	6	5	9	16	23	−7	17	
9	Salernitana (G)	20	5	4	11	20	32	−12	14	
10	Siena (G)	20	2	9	9	13	36	−23	13	
11	Anconitana (G, T)	20	3	3	14	12	41	−29	9	Readmitted in B

Source: Panini
5 Serie A clubs and 7 Serie B clubs (but Pisa did not join)
(A) Advance to a further round; (G) Guest; (P) Promoted; (T) Qualified, but not yet for the particular phase indicated

=== Results ===
Home \ Away	ANC	BAR	FIO	LAZ	NAP	PAL	PES	PLI	ROM	SAL	SIE
Anconitana		1–2	0–1	1–0	0–3	1–2	1–1	1–1	0–1	2–1	1–1
Bari	4–2		1–0	1–0	2–1	3–1	1–0	1–0	1–0	1–0	4–0
Fiorentina	5–0	2–0		4–3	0–1	2–0	3–1	2–1	2–0	4–0	5–0
Lazio	1–2	1–0	1–0		0–0	0–1	6–0	0–2	1–2	2–1	0–0
Napoli	2–0	2–1	1–0	0–0		2–0	1–0	1–0	1–1	1–0	6–1
Palermo	3–0	0–2	0–0	0–1	0–0		1–0	1–0	1–3	1–0	2–2
Pescara	4–0	3–1	3–0	2–2	2–1	0–0		1–2	2–2	5–1	2–0
Pro Livorno	4–0	4–1	1–1	1–0	1–0	4–2	1–0		1–1	3–0	0–0
Roma	3–0	1–1	1–0	0–1	0–0	2–1	0–0	2–2		4–2	1–0
Salernitana	1–0	2–3	1–0	2–0	1–1	0–0	2–0	0–0	1–3		3–0
Siena	1–0	1–1	1–1	0–0	1–4	1–0	1–1	1–2	0–1	2–2	

Updated to match(es) played on unknown. Source: Almanacco Illustrato del Calcio - La Storia 1898-2004, Panini Edizioni, Modena, September 2005 (in Italian)
Legend: Blue = home team win; Yellow = draw; Red = away team win.

== Final round ==
=== Classification ===
Pos	Team	Pld	W	D	L	GF	GA	GD	Pts	Qualification
1	Torino (C)	14	11	0	3	43	14	+29	22	Champions
2	Juventus	14	9	3	2	31	8	+23	21	
3	Milan	14	7	2	5	25	16	+9	16	
4	Internazionale	14	6	2	6	20	16	+4	14	
5	Napoli	14	5	3	6	19	27	−8	13	
6	Roma	14	4	3	7	16	22	−6	11	
7	Pro Livorno	14	4	2	8	13	35	−22	10	
8	Bari	14	1	3	10	6	35	−29	5	

Source: Panini
(C) Champions

=== Results ===
Home \ Away	BAR	INT	JUV	MIL	NAP	PLI	ROM	TOR
Bari		1–2	0–2	0–2	2–2	0–0	1–0	1–2
Internazionale	0–0		1–0	0–1	2–1	6–2	1–0	6–2
Juventus	6–1	1–0		3–1	6–0	5–1	2–1	1–0
Milan	8–0	3–2	1–1		2–3	1–0	2–0	2–0
Napoli	4–0	0–0	1–1	1–0		3–0	2–1	0–2
Pro Livorno	3–0	1–0	0–3	1–0	2–1		1–1	0–3
Roma	1–0	3–0	0–0	2–2	2–0	3–1		0–7
Torino	3–0	1–0	1–0	3–0	7–1	9–1	3–2	

Updated to match(es) played on unknown. Source: Almanacco Illustrato del Calcio - La Storia 1898-2004, Panini Edizioni, Modena, September 2005 (in Italian)
Legend: Blue = home team win; Yellow = draw; Red = away team win.

== Top goalscorers ==
Rank	Player	Club	Goals
1	(Italy) Guglielmo Gabetto	Torino	22
2	(Italy) Eusebio Castigliano	Torino	20
3	(Italy) Romano Penzo	Internazionale	18
4	(Italy) Enrico Candiani	Internazionale	17
5	(Italy) Silvio Piola	Juventus	16
5	(Italy) Aredio Gimona	Milan	16
5	(Italy) Valentino Mazzola	Torino	16
5	(Italy) Ezio Loik	Torino	16
9	(Italy) Dante Di Benedetti	Bari	14
10	(Italy) Giuseppe Baldini	Andrea Doria	13
11	(Italy) Mario Gritti	Fiorentina	12
12	(Austria) Engelbert König	Lazio	11

== References and sources ==
- Almanacco Illustrato del Calcio - La Storia 1898-2004, Panini Edizioni, Modena, September 2005
