= 1946–47 Serie A =

44th season of top-tier Italian football

Serie A
- Season: 1946–47
- Champions: Torino; 4th title
- Relegated: Brescia; Venezia
- Matches: 380
- Goals: 1,064 (2.8 per match)
- Top goalscorer: Valentino Mazzola (29 goals)

The 1946–47 Serie A was the forty-fifth edition of the Italian Football Championship. It was the first Serie A for three years due to the regional Divisione Nazionale format resurrected in the first season of the Italian championship immediately post war in 1945-46. It was the fifteenth Italian Football Championship branded Serie A since Serie A was launched in 1929.

This was the twenty-second season from which the Italian Football Champions adorned their team jerseys in the subsequent season with a Scudetto. Torino FC were champions for the fourth time in their history. This was their fourth scudetto since the scudetto started being awarded in 1924 and their second win contested as Serie A. This was their third of five consecutive Italian Football Championship wins, punctuated by a two-year break due to World War II.

Serie A 1946-47 team distribution

== Teams ==
Alessandria had been promoted from the 1945–46 Serie B-C Alta Italia and Napoli had been promoted from the 1945–46 Campionato Centro-Sud Serie A-B.

== Events ==
Following the expansion of the league to 20 clubs, the FIGC originally decided that three teams would be relegated instead of two, as was the case before the league hiatus caused by World War II. However, 20th-placed Triestina would be readmitted for the following season for political reasons.

== Final classification ==
Pos	Team	Pld	W	D	L	GF	GA	GD	Pts	Qualification or relegation
1	Torino (C)	38	28	7	3	104	35	+69	63	
2	Juventus	38	22	9	7	83	38	+45	53	
3	Modena	38	21	9	8	45	24	+21	51	
4	Milan	38	19	12	7	75	52	+23	50	
5	Bologna	38	15	9	14	42	41	+1	39	
5	Vicenza	38	16	7	15	53	57	−4	39	
7	Bari	38	16	6	16	33	48	−15	38	
8	Napoli	38	14	9	15	50	59	−9	37	
9	Atalanta	38	11	15	12	40	52	−12	37	
10	Internazionale	38	13	10	15	59	54	+5	36	
10	Sampdoria	38	14	8	16	56	52	+4	36	
10	Genoa	38	13	10	15	53	53	0	36	
10	Lazio	38	12	12	14	56	56	0	36	
14	Alessandria	38	13	9	16	59	60	−1	35	
15	Livorno	38	9	15	14	49	55	−6	33	
15	Roma	38	12	9	17	41	56	−15	33	
17	Fiorentina	38	10	12	16	46	69	−23	32	
18	Brescia (R)	38	10	11	17	45	58	−13	31	Relegation to Serie B
19	Venezia (R)	38	10	7	21	43	66	−23	27	Relegation to Serie B
20	Triestina (T)	38	5	8	25	32	79	−47	18	Readmitted (Note: Triestina was relegated and later readmitted to Serie A for political reasons against Yugoslavia.)

Source: Panini
(C) Champions; (R) Relegated; (T) Qualified, but not yet for the particular phase indicated

== Results ==
Home \ Away	ALE	ATA	BAR	BOL	BRE	FIO	GEN	INT	JUV	LAZ	LIV	MIL	MOD	NAP	ROM	SAM	TOR	TRI	VEN	VIC
Alessandria		1–1	1–0	0–1	2–2	1–1	2–2	1–0	2–0	2–1	4–1	4–1	1–3	5–0	1–0	0–1	2–0	5–0	1–1	0–2
Atalanta	1–0		3–0	2–1	2–0	1–1	1–0	0–3	1–3	1–1	3–1	1–3	1–1	2–1	0–0	1–1	0–3	1–1	3–2	1–1
Bari	2–2	2–0		1–0	0–0	1–0	2–0	1–2	0–1	1–3	2–1	0–3	0–0	1–0	2–0	2–1	0–0	2–0	1–0	1–0
Bologna	4–1	2–0	2–1		0–2	1–1	0–0	2–0	0–0	3–1	1–0	1–2	1–0	3–0	0–2	2–0	1–1	1–0	4–0	0–0
Brescia	0–3	4–1	0–0	0–1		1–0	5–1	2–2	1–1	2–0	0–1	1–1	0–1	2–1	3–0	2–1	0–1	2–2	0–2	0–2
Fiorentina	2–0	1–0	2–0	0–0	3–1		2–2	3–3	2–1	4–1	2–2	0–3	1–2	1–0	3–3	2–1	0–4	2–1	1–1	4–1
Genoa	3–1	2–2	1–0	3–0	4–0	5–0		0–0	1–0	3–0	0–0	0–2	1–1	2–1	3–0	2–3	2–3	3–1	2–1	2–0
Internazionale	4–2	0–1	3–1	1–1	1–1	4–0	2–1		0–0	3–0	1–1	1–2	1–0	2–3	0–0	2–1	1–3	5–2	3–1	1–2
Juventus	3–1	4–1	6–0	2–0	1–0	3–1	2–1	4–1		3–3	2–1	1–2	1–0	1–0	4–0	2–1	0–1	4–0	7–3	1–2
Lazio	3–1	0–0	0–1	3–1	6–3	3–0	1–1	0–1	1–2		3–0	1–1	1–2	2–1	0–0	4–0	1–2	3–0	3–1	1–1
Livorno	4–2	0–0	0–0	1–1	2–2	2–1	1–1	3–1	2–2	1–1		2–2	0–1	2–2	4–1	0–0	0–2	3–0	0–0	3–0
Milan	4–0	0–0	0–2	4–2	2–1	2–2	4–1	3–1	3–3	0–0	2–2		1–1	4–2	3–1	1–0	1–2	3–0	3–2	2–3
Modena	0–0	0–0	0–1	1–0	1–1	3–0	2–1	1–0	1–0	2–1	1–0	2–1		6–1	1–0	1–0	2–4	0–1	2–0	1–0
Napoli	2–1	3–1	5–1	2–0	2–1	1–1	2–1	1–0	3–3	0–0	4–0	0–0	1–0		0–3	1–0	2–2	2–0	1–1	2–2
Roma	0–2	3–0	2–0	1–1	2–1	2–0	0–1	2–1	1–5	3–0	0–1	1–1	0–0	0–0		3–1	1–3	4–1	1–2	0–0
Sampdoria	1–1	1–1	6–1	0–1	2–2	1–0	3–0	1–5	0–3	1–1	2–1	2–1	0–2	0–1	4–0		3–1	4–1	3–1	2–1
Torino	4–1	5–3	2–1	4–0	4–0	7–2	6–0	5–2	0–0	5–1	3–2	6–2	1–1	2–1	4–0	1–1		1–1	2–0	6–0
Triestina	1–3	1–3	0–1	3–1	0–1	1–1	0–0	0–0	1–5	2–2	0–3	1–2	0–1	3–0	0–2	1–1	0–1		2–0	2–0
Venezia	1–1	0–0	1–2	2–0	1–2	3–0	2–1	2–1	0–2	1–2	1–0	1–1	2–1	0–1	2–3	0–2	1–0	4–1		1–2
Vicenza	4–2	0–1	1–0	0–3	2–0	1–0	1–0	1–1	1–1	1–2	5–2	2–3	0–1	4–1	2–0	1–5	0–3	3–2	5–0	

Source: Almanacco Illustrato del Calcio - La Storia 1898-2004, Panini Edizioni, Modena, September 2005 (in Italian)
Legend: Blue = home team win; Yellow = draw; Red = away team win.

== Top goalscorers ==
Rank	Player	Club	Goals
1	(Italy) Valentino Mazzola	Torino	29
2	(Italy) Ettore Puricelli	Milan	21
3	(Italy) Riccardo Carapellese	Milan	20
4	(Italy) Guglielmo Gabetto	Torino	19
5	(Italy) Giuseppe Baldini	Sampdoria	18
6	(Italy) Mario Astorri	Juventus	17
6	(Italy) Renato Raccis	Livorno	17
8	(Italy) Riccardo Dalla Torre	Genoa	16
8	(Italy) Cosimo Muci	Internazionale	16
10	(Italy) Enrico Candiani	Juventus	15
10	(Czechoslovakia) Július Korostelev	Juventus	15

== References and sources ==
- Almanacco Illustrato del Calcio - La Storia 1898-2004, Panini Edizioni, Modena, September 2005
