= 1948–49 AC Torino season =

Associazione Calcio Torino
1948-49 season
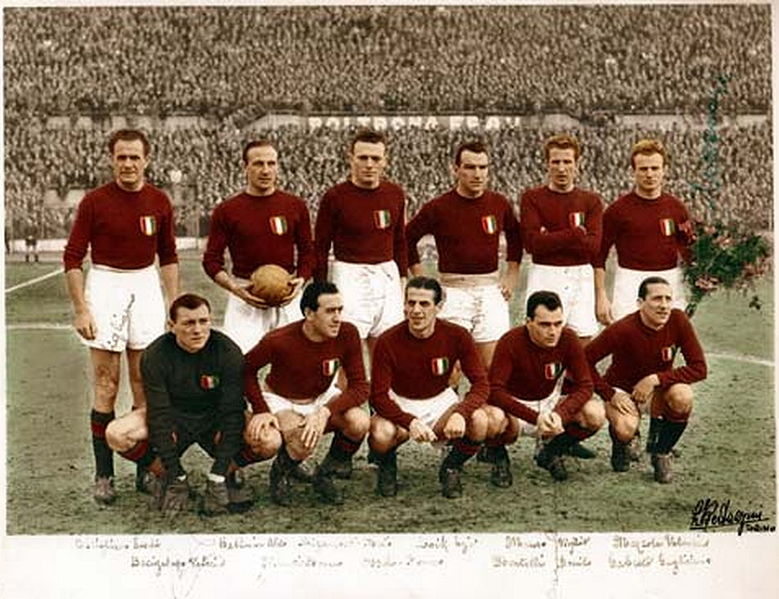
- Chairman: Ferruccio Novo
- Manager: Ernest Egri Erbstein (until 4 May); Roberto Copernico & Leslie Lievesley (as technical director, until 4 May); Oberdan Ussello (as technical director)
- Stadium: Stadio Filadelfia
- Serie A: 1st (in 1949 Latin Cup)
- Top goalscorer: Mazzola (16)
Home colours	Away colours

During the 1948–49 season Associazione Calcio Torino competed in Serie A.

== Summary ==
The season is remembered by Superga air disaster , on 4 May ending the Grande Torino era. After clinching 4 consecutive titles the Granata were ready to win the 5th title at top of the league table. 4 rounds before the ending of championship Grande Torino traveled to Lisbon, to play a friendly match against Benfica due to retirement of Francisco Ferreira. Game which Toro lost 4–3. Torino was named winner of the championship by the Federation, and the Youth squad was able to play the last 4 rounds. Finished a short summer interval from the end of previous season, competition officially resumed in Italy after the 1948 Summer Olympics. Prematurely eliminated, Vittorio Pozzo lost his position as sole commissioner of the Italy national team and Ferruccio Novo took his place.

New season began in mid-September with a Torino almost identical to that of the previous championships; there was only Franco Ossola permanently in place of Pietro Ferraris, who, at age 36, had moved to Novara. The midfielder Rubens Fadini arrived from Gallarate, Dino Ballarin, brother of the goalkeeper Aldo was signed from Chioggia; the Hungarian-Czechoslovak Július Schubert, a left-sided midfielder; and strikers Emile Bongiorni and Ruggero Grava arrived from Racing Parigi and Roubaix-Tourcoing respectively. The club began the season after a long tour in Brazil where the team met Palmeiras, Corinthians, São Paulo and Portuguesa, losing only once. During the season, reduced to 24 teams after three promotions and relegations, Ernest Erbstein was appointed as the team's technical director and the Englishman Leslie Lievesley became the coach. The campaign also saw injuries to Virgilio Maroso, Eusebio Castigliano, Romeo Menti and Sauro Tomà, plus the long suspension for Aldo Ballarin. The Granata, which debuted with a victory against Pro Patria, suffered a defeat in the second round to Atalanta; the team recovered with five straight wins, including that of the derby, but lost again, in Milan, against the Rossoneri. The club would relinquish the lead in the standings, then recapture it, finishing midway through the season on par with Genoa, from which a third defeat was suffered, losing 3–0. In the return leg of the derby Torino would defeat Juventus 3–0. Torino's advantage increased in the standings, gaining a maximum of six point on Inter in second place. However, a pair of draws (in Trieste and Bari) allowed Inter to close the gap within four points from Torino. On 30 April 1949, the two clubs met in Milan, ending 0–0, with Torino approaching their fifth consecutive title (the record would be equaled). The team travelled to Portugal to play in a friendly against Benfica. However, upon return Torino perished in the Superga air disaster.

=== Superga air disaster ===
The airplane with the team crashed at Basilica di Superga nearby Torino. There were deaths of team chairmen and club workers, baggage men and three of the best journalists in the country at the time: Renato Casalbore (founder of Tuttosport magazine); Renato Tosatti (from journal Gazzetta del Popolo) and Luigi Cavallero (from journal La Stampa). The shocking corpse identification was made by former Italian National Team manager Vittorio Pozzo. The spezzino player Sauro Tomà, injured, did not travel to Lisbon. The following persons in the Torino circle did not travel: second goalkeeper Renato Gandolfi (instead third goalkeeper Dino Ballarin did), the radio anchor Nicolò Carosio and former manager of Italian National Team also journalist Vittorio Pozzo (Torino preferred to give the seat to Cavallero).

==== Legacy ====
The impact of the tragedy in Italy was colossal. An official estimate of about one million persons attended funerals at Piazza in the city of Torino to say goodbye to the players and club officials. The shock of the tragedy was the main reason for the long travel on boat across the Atlantic Ocean by Italian National Team to play the 1950 FIFA World Cup in Brazil rather than use an airplane. Rebuilding of Torino as a competitive squad lasted a long term and could not win another championship until 1976.

==== List of victims ====
Players

- Valerio Bacigalupo
- Aldo Ballarin
- Dino Ballarin
- Émile Bongiorni
- Eusebio Castigliano
- Rubens Fadini
- Guglielmo Gabetto
- Ruggero Grava
- Giuseppe Grezar
- Ezio Loik
- Virgilio Maroso
- Danilo Martelli
- Valentino Mazzola(Captain)
- Romeo Menti
- Piero Operto
- Franco Ossola
- Mario Rigamonti
- Július Schubert

Club officials

- Arnaldo Agnisetta
- Ippolito Civalleri
- Andrea Bonaiuti (coordinator of team travels)

Managers

- Egri Erbstein
- Leslie Lievesley
- Osvaldo Cortina (physical)

Journalists

- Renato Casalbore
- Renato Tosatti
- Luigi Cavallero

Baggage Men

- Pierluigi Meroni
- Celeste D'Inca
- Cesare Biancardi
- Antonio Pangrazi

== Squad ==
Note: Flags indicate national team as defined under FIFA eligibility rules; some limited exceptions apply. Players may hold more than one non-FIFA nationality.

Pos.	Nation	Player
GK	ITA	Valerio Bacigalupo
GK	ITA	Dino Ballarin
GK	ITA	Renato Gandolfi
DF	ITA	Aldo Ballarin
DF	ITA	Virgilio Maroso
DF	ITA	Piero Operto
DF	ITA	Mario Rigamonti
DF	ITA	Sauro Tomà
MF	ITA	Pietro Biglino
MF	ITA	Eusebio Castigliano
MF	ITA	Rubens Fadini
MF	ITA	Luigi Giuliano

Pos.	Nation	Player
MF	ITA	Giuseppe Grezar
MF	ITA	Ezio Loik
MF	ITA	Danilo Martelli
MF	CZE	Július Schubert
FW	ITA	Alfio Balbiano
FW	FRA	Émile Bongiorni
FW	ITA	Guglielmo Gabetto
FW	FRA	Ruggero Grava
FW	ITA	Valentino Mazzola (Captain)
FW	ITA	Romeo Menti II
FW	ITA	Franco Ossola

=== Youth Squad ===
After Superga air disaster, youth squad (primavera) disputed the remaining four matches of the Serie A: they are not considered title winners due to Italian Federation (FIGC) actually assigned the championship to the senior squad.

Note: Flags indicate national team as defined under FIFA eligibility rules; some limited exceptions apply. Players may hold more than one non-FIFA nationality.

Pos.	Nation	Player
GK	ITA	Guido Vandone
DF	ITA	Pietro Bersia
DF	ITA	Sergio Lussu
DF	ITA	Sergio Mari
DF	ITA	Umberto Motto
MF	ITA	Oscar Ferrari

Pos.	Nation	Player
MF	ITA	Antonio Gianmarinaro
MF	ITA	Lando Macchi
FW	ITA	Mario Audisio
FW	ITA	Andrea Francone
FW	ITA	Giuseppe Marchetto

=== Transfers ===
In
Pos.	Name	from	Type
GK	Renato Gandolfi	Carrarese	
DF	Piero Operto	Casale	
DF	Vito Sante Miolli	Castellana	
MF	Rubens Fadini	Gallaratese	
MF	Luigi Giuliano	Pro Vercelli	
MF	Július Schubert	Slovan Bratislava	
FW	Émile Bongiorni	RC Paris	
FW	Ruggero Grava	CO Roubaix-Tourcoing	

Out
Pos.	Name	To	Type
DF	Raffaele Cuscela	Lucchese	loan out
FW	Josef Fabian	Lucchese	
FW	Pietro Ferraris II	Novara	
FW	Oreste Guaraldo	Prato	

== Competitions ==
=== Serie A ===
==== League table ====
Pos	Team	Pld	W	D	L	GF	GA	GD	Pts	Qualification or relegation
1	Torino (C)	38	25	10	3	78	34	+44	60	1949 Latin Cup
2	Internazionale	38	22	11	5	85	39	+46	55	
3	Milan	38	21	8	9	83	52	+31	50	
4	Juventus	38	18	8	12	64	47	+17	44	
5	Sampdoria	38	16	9	13	74	63	+11	41	

Source: Panini
(C) Champions

==== Matches ====
Win Draw Loss

19 September 1948 1	Torino	4–1	Pro Patria	Turin
16:00 UTC+1	Ossola 23'; Menti II 56' (pen.); Gabetto 72'; Grezar 89'	Report	88' Turconi	Stadium: Stadio Filadelfia; Referee: Giuseppe Boffardi

26 September 1948 2	Atalanta	3–2	Torino	Bergamo
16:00 UTC+1	Miglioli 6', 74'; Mari 73'	Report	1' Grezar; 19' Mazzola	Stadium: Comunale; Attendance: 18 000; Referee: Giorgio Bernardi

3 October 1948 3	Torino	4–0	Roma	Turin
15:30 UTC+1	Gabetto 4', 68'; Menti II 32'; Ossola 89'	Report		Stadium: Stadio Filadelfia; Attendance: 20 533; Referee: Giovanni Galeati

10 October 1948 4	Livorno	0–2	Torino	Livorno
15:30 UTC+1		Report	40' Mazzola; 66' Loik	Stadium: Ardenza; Attendance: 20 000; Referee: Guido Agnolin

17 October 1948 5	Torino	2–1	Lucchese	Turin
15:00 UTC+1	Gabetto 49'; Grezar 70'	Report	45' Fabian	Stadium: Stadio Filadelfia; Referee: Antonio Zambotto

24 October 1948 6	Juventus	1–2	Torino	Torino
15:00 UTC+1	Ballarin 36' (o.g.)	Report	25' Ossola; 77' Mazzola	Stadium: Comunale; Attendance: 60 000; Referee: Generoso Dattilo

31 October 1948 7	Torino	3–1	Padova	Turin
14:30 UTC+1	Ossola 73', 83'; Mazzola 77'	Report	41' Adcock	Stadium: Stadio Filadelfia; Attendance: 5 400; Referee: Bruno Zilli

4 November 1948 8	Milan	1–0	Torino	Milan
14:30 UTC+1	Burini 62'	Report		Stadium: Stadio San Siro; Attendance: 45 000; Referee: Vincenzo Orlandini

7 November 1948 9	Torino	1–0	Lazio	Turin
14:30 UTC+1	Mazzola 24'	Report		Stadium: Stadio Filadelfia; Attendance: 12 454; Referee: Eliseo Camiolo

14 November 1948 10	Bologna	2–2	Torino	Bologna
14:30 UTC+1	Gritti 12', 54'	Report	14' Mazzola; 87' Luigi Giuliano	Stadium: Stadio Comunale; Referee: Generoso Dattilo

21 November 1948 11	Novara	0–2	Torino	Novara
14:30 UTC+1		Report	19' Luigi Giuliano; 77' Loik	Stadium: Stadio Comunale; Referee: Giorgio Bernardi

28 November 1948 12	Torino	1–1	Triestina	Turin
14:30 UTC+1	Mazzola 56'	Report	78' Tosolini	Stadium: Stadio Filadelfia; Referee: Bruno Tassini

5 December 1948 13	Modena	0–1	Torino	Modena
14:30 UTC+1		Report	76' Giuliano	Stadium: Stadio Cesare Marzari; Referee: Riccardo Pieri

12 December 1948 15	Torino	4–2	Inter	Turin
14:30 UTC+1	Mazzola 3'; Menti II 42', 72'; Ossola 53'	Report	52' Armano; 66' (pen.) Nyers I	Stadium: Comunale; Attendance: 26 700; Referee: Vincenzo Orlandini

19 December 1948 16	Fiorentina	0–0	Torino	Florence
14:30 UTC+1		Report		Stadium: Stadio Comunale; Referee: Giovanni Galeati

26 December 1948 17	Genoa	3–0	Torino	Genoa
14:30 UTC+1	Mazza 48'; Operto 59' (o.g.); Pellicari 80' (pen.)	Report		Stadium: Stadio Luigi Ferraris; Referee: Luigi Gemini

29 December 1948 14	Torino	2–0	Bari	Turin
14:30 UTC+1	Menti II 29'; Ossola 51'	Report		Stadium: Stadio Filadelfia; Attendance: 4 000; Referee: Giuseppe Vannini

6 January 1949 19	Palermo	2–2	Torino	Palermo
14:30 UTC+1	Pavesi 72'; Andrea Milani 79'	Report	41' Gabetto; 54' Bongiorni	Stadium: Stadio La Favorita; Attendance: 40 000; Referee: Vittorio Pera

9 January 1949 20	Pro Patria	0–1	Torino	Busto Arsizio
14:30 UTC+1		Report	28' Schubert	Stadium: Comunale; Referee: Generoso Dattilo

16 January 1949 21	Torino	2–0	Atalanta	Turin
14:30 UTC+1	Bongiorni 44'; Rigamonti 75'	Report		Stadium: Stadio Filadelfia; Referee: Mario Maurelli

23 January 1949 22	Roma	1–2	Torino	Rome
14:30 UTC+1	Andreoli 50' (pen.)	Report	54' Mazzola; 61' Gabetto	Stadium: Stadio Nazionale; Attendance: 33 000; Referee: Bruno Tassini

27 January 1949 18	Torino	2–1	Sampdoria	Turin
15:00 UTC+1	Mazzola 14'; Loik 35'	Report	21' Lucentini	Stadium: Stadio Filadelfia; Referee: Ferruccio Bellè

30 January 1949 23	Torino	1–0	Livorno	Turin
15:00 UTC+1	Mazzola 89'	Report		Stadium: Stadio Filadelfia; Referee: Cesare Cappucci

6 February 1949 24	Lucchese	1–1	Torino	Lucca
15:00 UTC+1	Conti 89' (pen.)	Report	68' Mazzola	Stadium: Stadio Porta Elisa; Referee: Vincenzo Orlandini

13 February 1949 25	Torino	3–1	Juventus	Turin
15:00 UTC+1	Gabetto 17'; Loik 55', 83'	Report	49' Cergoli	Stadium: Stadio Filadelfia; Referee: Giovanni Galeati

20 February 1949 26	Padova	4–4	Torino	Padua
15:00 UTC+1	Checchetti 22', 26'; Vitali 45'; Fiore 52'	Report	36' Ossola; 39' Castigliano; 71', 77' Menti II	Stadium: Stadio Silvio Appiani; Attendance: 20 000; Referee: Luigi Gemini

6 March 1949 27	Torino	4–1	Milan	Turin
15:30 UTC+1	Ossola 11', 75'; Gabetto 52'; Fadini 71'	Report	46' Burini	Stadium: Comunale; Attendance: 50 000; Referee: Generoso Dattilo

13 March 1949 28	Lazio	2–2	Torino	Rome
15:30 UTC+1	Flamini 8'; Höfling 41'	Report	17', 39' Loik	Stadium: Stadio Nazionale; Referee: Ferruccio Bellè

20 March 1949 29	Torino	1–0	Bologna	Turin
15:30 UTC+1	Mazzola 69'	Report		Stadium: Stadio Filadelfia; Referee: Eliseo Camiolo

3 April 1949 30	Torino	4–0	Novara	Turin
15:30 UTC+1	Mazzola 32'; Loik 35', 37'; Ossola 40'	Report		Stadium: Stadio Filadelfia; Referee: Giuseppe Vannini

10 April 1949 31	Triestina	1–1	Torino	Trieste
15:30 UTC+1	Blason 70' (pen.)	Report	35' (pen.) Menti II	Stadium: Comunale; Referee: Orlandini

17 April 1949 32	Torino	3–1	Modena	Turin
15:30 UTC+1	Mazzola 35'; Menti II 85'; Ballarin 87'	Report	13' Cavazzuti	Stadium: Stadio Filadelfia; Referee: Cesare Cappucci

24 April 1949 33	Bari	1–1	Torino	Bari
15:30 UTC+1	Voros 66'	Report	11' Mazzola	Stadium: Stadio della Vittoria; Referee: Vittorio Pera

30 April 1949 34	Inter	0–0	Torino	Milan
16:00 UTC+1		Report		Stadium: Stadio San Siro; Attendance: 37 000; Referee: Luigi Gemini

15 May 1949 36	Torino	4–0	Genoa	Turin
16:30 UTC+1	Giammarinaro 37'; Marchetto 56', 86'; Lussu 80' (pen.)	Report		Stadium: Stadio Filadelfia; Referee: Ferruccio Bellè

22 May 1949 38	Torino	3–0	Palermo	Florence
15:30 UTC+1	Marchetto 8'; Francone 38'; Gianmarinaro 55'	Report		Stadium: Comunale; Attendance: 85 000; Referee: Renzo Massai

29 May 1949 37	Sampdoria	2–3	Torino	Genoa
16:00 UTC+1	Pieri 7', 21'	Report	1' Audisio; 16' Marchetto; 56' (pen.) Lussu	Stadium: Stadio Luigi Ferraris; Referee: Giuseppe Carpani

12 June 1949 35	Torino	2–0	Fiorentina	Turin
16:00 UTC+1	Marchetto 12'; Giuliano 79'	Report		Stadium: Stadio Filadelfia; Referee: Giuseppe Parpaiola

== Statistics ==
=== Squad statistics ===
Competition	Points	Home						Away						Total						GD
Competition	Points	G	V	D	L	Gs	Ga	G	V	D	L	Gs	Ga	G	V	D	L	Gs	Ga	GD
Serie A	60	19	18	1	0	48	10	19	7	9	3	30	24	38	25	10	3	78	34	+44

=== Players statistics ===
Numbers of Youth squad in cursive.

==== Appearances ====
- 34. (Italy) Guglielmo Gabetto
- 32. (Italy) Valerio Bacigalupo
- 32. (Italy) Aldo Ballarin
- 31. (Italy) Mario Rigamonti
- 30. (Italy) Valentino Mazzola
- 29. (Italy) Romeo Menti
- 28. (Italy) Ezio Loik
- 28. (Italy) Danilo Martelli
- 25. (Italy) Franco Ossola
- 21. (Italy) Giuseppe Grezar
- 21. (Italy) Eusebio Castigliano
- 18. (Italy) Virgilio Maroso
- 11. (Italy) Piero Operto
- 10. (Italy) Rubens Fadini
- 8. (France) Emile Bongiorni
- 8. (Italy) Luigi Giuliano
- 3. (Italy) Mario Audisio
- 2. (Italy) Alfio Balbiano
- 1. (Italy) Piero Bersia
- 2. (Italy) Pietro Biglino
- 3. (Italy) Oscar Ferrari
- 4. (Italy) Andrea Francone
- 2. (Italy) Renato Gandolfi
- 4. (Italy) Antonio Gianmarinaro
- 1. (France) Ruggero Grava
- 4. (Italy) Sergio Lussu
- 3. (Italy) Lando Macchi
- 4. (Italy) Giuseppe Marchetto
- 4. (Italy) Sergio Mari
- 4. (Italy) Umberto Motto
- 5. (Czechoslovakia) Julius Schubert
- 2. (Italy) Sauro Tomà
- 4. (Italy) Guido Vandone

==== Goalscorers ====
- 16. (Italy) Valentino Mazzola
- 11. (Italy) Franco Ossola
- 9. (Italy) Ezio Loik
- 9. (Italy) Romeo Menti
- 8. (Italy) Guglielmo Gabetto
- 1. (Italy) Mario Audisio
- 1. (Italy) Aldo Ballarin
- 2. (France) Emile Bongiorni
- 1. (Italy) Eusebio Castigliano
- 1. (Italy) Rubens Fadini
- 1. (Italy) Andrea Francone
- 2. (Italy) Antonio Gianmarinaro
- 4. (Italy) Luigi Giuliano
- 3. (Italy) Giuseppe Grezar
- 2. (Italy) Sergio Lussu
- 5. (Italy) Giuseppe Marchetto
- 1. (Italy) Mario Rigamonti
- 1. (Czechoslovakia) Julius Schubert

== See also ==
- Grande Torino
