= 1947–48 AC Torino season =

Associazione Calcio Torino
1947–48 season
- Chairman: Ferruccio Novo
- Manager: Roberto Copernico
- Stadium: Stadio Filadelfia
- Serie A: 1st
- Top goalscorer: Mazzola (25)
Home colours	Away colours

During the 1947–48 season Associazione Calcio Torino competed in Serie A .

== Summary ==
The team set many records throughout the season: top score in the standings, with 65 points in 40 games; the maximum advantage over 2nd place: 16 points over A.C. Milan, Juventus and Triestina; biggest home win, 10–0 against Alessandria; a total of 29 wins out of 40 games; the longest unbeaten run, 21, with 17 wins and 4 draws; the most points at home, having won 19 games out of 20 at Stadio Filadelfia; the highest number of goals scored, 125; and fewest conceded, 33. The best goalscorers were Mazzola (25 goals) and Gabetto (23), just behind Giampiero Boniperti from Juventus with 27 goals.

== Squad ==
Source: Note: Flags indicate national team as defined under FIFA eligibility rules; some limited exceptions apply. Players may hold more than one non-FIFA nationality.

Pos.	Nation	Player
GK	ITA	Valerio Bacigalupo
GK	ITA	Dino Ballarin
DF	ITA	Aldo Ballarin
DF	ITA	Virgilio Maroso
DF	ITA	Mario Rigamonti
DF	ITA	Sauro Tomà
MF	ITA	Eusebio Castigliano
MF	ITA	Giuseppe Grezar

Pos.	Nation	Player
MF	ITA	Ezio Loik
MF	ITA	Danilo Martelli
FW	ROU	Josef Fabian
FW	ITA	Pietro Ferraris II
FW	ITA	Guglielmo Gabetto
FW	ITA	Valentino Mazzola (Captain)
FW	ITA	Romeo Menti II
FW	ITA	Franco Ossola

=== Transfers ===
In
Pos.	Name	from	Type
GK	Dino Ballarin	Clodia	
DF	Raffaele Cuscela	Taranto	
DF	Sauro Tomà	Spezia	
FW	Josef Fabian	Carmen Bucarest	
FW	Oreste Guaraldo	Novara	loan ended

Out
Pos.	Name	To	Type
GK	Dante Piani	Lucchese	
DF	Francesco Rosetta	Alessandria	
FW	Guido Tieghi	Livorno	

== Competitions ==
=== Serie A ===
==== League table ====
Pos	Team	Pld	W	D	L	GF	GA	GD	Pts
1	Torino (C)	40	29	7	4	125	33	+92	65
2	Milan	40	21	7	12	76	48	+28	49
3	Juventus	40	19	11	10	74	48	+26	49
4	Triestina (G)	40	17	15	8	51	42	+9	49
5	Atalanta	40	16	12	12	48	41	+7	44

Source: Panini
(C) Champions; (G) Guests

==== Matches ====
Win Draw Loss

14 September 1947 1	Torino	4–0	Napoli	Turin
15:30 UTC+1	Mazzola 44'; Gabetto 51'; Menti II 81'; Ferraris II 88'	Report		Stadium: Stadio Filadelfia; Attendance: 17 600; Referee: Luigi Gemini

21 September 1947 2	Bari	1–0	Torino	Bari
15:30 UTC+1	Tavellin 10'	Report		Stadium: Stadio della Vittoria; Referee: Guido Agnolin

28 September 1947 3	Torino	6–0	Lucchese	Turin
15:30 UTC+1	Loik 28', 36'; Mazzola 59'; Gabetto 76'; Ballarin 78'; Castigliano 89'	Report		Stadium: Stadio Filadelfia; Referee: Bruno Zill

5 October 1947 4	Roma	1–7	Torino	Rome
15:30 UTC+1	Amadei 33'	Report	60', 74', 64' Mazzola; 62' Castigliano; 81', 86' Fabian; 82' Ferraris II	Stadium: Stadio Nazionale; Referee: Giorgio Bernardi

12 October 1947 5	Torino	2–0	Vicenza	Turin
15:30 UTC+1	Mazzola 1'; Fabian 16'	Report		Stadium: Stadio Filadelfia; Referee: Giuseppe Carpani

19 October 1947 6	Pro Patria	0–2	Torino	Busto Arsizio
15:00 UTC+1		Report	84' Mazzola; 87' Menti II	Stadium: Comunale; Attendance: 26 000; Referee: Vittorio Pera

26 October 1947 7	Torino	1–1	Juventus	Turin
14:30 UTC+1	Mazzola 9'	Report	70' (pen.) Sentimenti III	Stadium: Stadio Filadelfia; Referee: Ferruccio Bellè

2 November 1947 8	Bologna	1–0	Torino	Bologna
14:30 UTC+1	Cappello 45'	Report		Stadium: Comunale; Attendance: 50 000; Referee: Riccardo Pieri

16 November 1947 9	Torino	7–1	Salernitana	Turin
14:30 UTC+1	Gabetto 8'; Loik 12', 53', 68'; Menti II 32'; Grezar 70'; Fabian 87'	Report	41' Vaschetto	Stadium: Stadio Filadelfia; Referee: Giovanni Galeati

23 November 1947 10	Sampdoria	0–1	Torino	Genoa
14:30 UTC+1		Report	37' (pen.) Menti II	Stadium: Stadio Luigi Ferraris; Referee: Vincenzo Orlandini

30 November 1947 11	Alessandria	2–2	Torino	Alessandria
14:30 UTC+1	Stradella 37'; Sotgiu 38'	Report	17' Mazzola; 18' Menti II	Stadium: Stadio Giuseppe Moccagatta; Attendance: 19,000; Referee: Giorgio Bernardi

7 December 1947 12	Torino	5–0	Inter	Turin
14:30 UTC+1	Menti II 20'; Loik 30'; Mazzola 32'; Fabian 49'; Gabetto 64'	Report		Stadium: Stadio Filadelfia; Attendance: 20,000; Referee: Giovanni Galeati

21 December 1947 13	Atalanta	1–0	Torino	Bergamo
14:30 UTC+1	Salvi 18'	Report		Stadium: Stadio Comunale; Referee: Generoso Dattilo

28 December 1947 14	Torino	6–0	Triestina	Turin
14:30 UTC+1	Gabetto 32'; Menti II 48', 73' (pen.); Loik 50'; Ferraris II 65'; Maroso 90'	Report		Stadium: Stadio Filadelfia; Referee: Bruno Tassini

1 January 1948 15	Torino	5–0	Fiorentina	Turin
14:30 UTC+1	Mazzola 5'; Loik 32', 68'; Gabetto 37'; Martelli 67'	Report		Stadium: Stadio Filadelfia; Attendance: 17,000; Referee: Giuseppe Boffardi

4 January 1948 16	Lazio	0–0	Torino	Rome
14:30 UTC+1		Report		Stadium: Stadio Nazionale; Referee: Eriprando Poggipollini

11 January 1948 17	Livorno	1–3	Torino	Livorno
14:30 UTC+1	Brondi 27' (pen.)	Report	9' Gabetto; 46', 89' Martelli	Stadium: Ardenza; Attendance: 20,000; Referee: Luigi Gemini

18 January 1948 18	Torino	2–1	Genoa	Turin
14:30 UTC+1	Gabetto 36'; Mazzola 38'	Report	29' Brighenti I	Stadium: Stadio Filadelfia; Attendance: 17 000; Referee: Mario Maurelli

25 January 1948 19	Milan	3–2	Torino	Milan
14:30 UTC+1	Puricelli 7', 32'; Degano 45'	Report	47' Menti II; 70' Mazzola	Stadium: Stadio San Siro; Attendance: 55,000; Referee: Generoso Dattilo

1 February 1948 20	Modena	0–3	Torino	Modena
14:30 UTC+1		Report	2' Gabetto; 61' Fabian; 85' (pen.) Menti II	Stadium: Stadio Cesare Marzari; Attendance: 25,000; Referee: Bruno Tassini

15 February 1948 22	Napoli	0–0	Torino	Naples
15:00 UTC+1		Report		Stadium: Stadio della Liberazione; Referee: Giorgio Bernardi

22 February 1948 23	Torino	5–1	Bari	Turin
15:00 UTC+1	Fabian 36'; Gabetto 44', 61'; Mazzola 70'; Martelli 79'	Report	83' Orlando	Stadium: Stadio Filadelfia; Referee: Bruno Guarda

29 February 1948 24	Lucchese	2–2	Torino	Lucca
15:30 UTC+1	Rosellini 9'; Tóth 46'	Report	49' Grezar; 83' Mazzola	Stadium: Stadio Porta Elisa; Referee: Giovanni Galeati

7 March 1948 25	Torino	4–1	Roma	Turin
15:30 UTC+1	Loik 20'; Martelli 63'; Ossola 70'; Menti II 86'	Report	10' Di Paola	Stadium: Stadio Filadelfia; Attendance: 18,000; Referee: Eriprando Poggipollini

14 March 1948 26	Vicenza	0–4	Torino	Vicenza
15:30 UTC+1		Report	1' Castigliano; 21' Menti II; 78' Loik; 85' Ossola	Stadium: Comunale; Referee: Giovanni Galeati

21 March 1948 27	Torino	4–1	Pro Patria	Turin
15:30 UTC+1	Ossola 33'; Loik 49'; Grezar 51'; Menti II 63'	Report	89' (pen.) Turconi	Stadium: Stadio Filadelfia; Referee: Giuseppe Parpaiola

28 March 1948 28	Juventus	1–1	Torino	Turin
15:30 UTC+1	Ballarin 50' (o.g.)	Report	37' Ossola	Stadium: Stadio Comunale; Referee: Luigi Gemini

11 April 1948 29	Torino	5–1	Bologna	Turin
16:00 UTC+1	Mazzola 9'; Gabetto 15', 57', 88'; Ossola 34'	Report	78' Marchese	Stadium: Stadio Filadelfia; Referee: Ferruccio Bonivento

17 April 1948 30	Salernitana	1–4	Torino	Salerno
16:00 UTC+1	Merlin 7'	Report	17', 59' Gabetto; 74' Ossola; 81' Mazzola	Stadium: Comunale; Attendance: 14 000; Referee: Bruno Zilli

25 April 1948 31	Torino	3–2	Sampdoria	Turin
16:00 UTC+1	Ossola 4'; Gabetto 14'; Martelli 68'	Report	28' Rebuzzi; 89' Barsanti	Stadium: Stadio Filadelfia; Referee: Guido Agnolin

2 May 1948 32	Torino	10–0	Alessandria	Turin
16:00 UTC+1	Ossola 5'; Loik 7', 42', 86'; Mazzola 35'; Grezar 75', 77'; Fabian 81', 83'; Gabetto 88'	Report		Stadium: Stadio Filadelfia; Attendance: 10 500; Referee: Bruno Guarda

6 May 1948 33	Inter	0–1	Torino	Milan
16:00 UTC+1		Report	87' Mazzola	Stadium: Stadio San Siro; Referee: Luigi Gemini

9 May 1948 34	Torino	4–0	Atalanta	Turin
16:00 UTC+1	Mazzola 13', 24'; Menti II 78'; Gabetto 80'	Report		Stadium: Stadio Filadelfia; Attendance: 15 000; Referee: Bruno Zilli

23 May 1948 35	Triestina	0–0	Torino	Trieste
16:00 UTC+1		Report		Stadium: Comunale; Referee: Eliseo Camiolo

27 May 1948 36	Fiorentina	1–2	Torino	Florence
16:30 UTC+1	Galassi 8'	Report	50' (pen.) Menti II; 74' Mazzola	Stadium: Stadio Comunale; Referee: Giorgio Bernardi

30 May 1948 37	Torino	4–3	Lazio	Turin
16:30 UTC+1	Castigliano 25', 55'; Gabetto 43'; Mazzola 61'	Report	4' Puccinelli; 13' (o.g.) Grezar; 20' Penzo	Stadium: Stadio Filadelfia; Referee: Guido Agnolin

6 June 1948 38	Torino	5–2	Livorno	Turin
16:30 UTC+1	Mazzola 15', 69'; Stua 47' (o.g.); Gabetto 56'; Martelli 75'	Report	42' Tieghi; 55' Piana	Stadium: Stadio Filadelfia; Attendance: 6 500; Referee: Mario Scotto

16 June 1948 39	Genoa	1–2	Torino	Genoa
16:30 UTC+1	Bergamo 46'	Report	44' Castigliano; 54' Gabetto	Stadium: Stadio Luigi Ferraris; Attendance: 30 000; Referee: Ferruccio Bellè

20 June 1948 40	Torino	2–1	Milan	Turin
17:00 UTC+1	Gabetto 23'; Ossola 30'	Report	43' Burini	Stadium: Stadio Filadelfia; Attendance: 20 000; Referee: Giorgio Bernardi

27 June 1948 41	Torino	5–2	Modena	Turin
17:00 UTC+1	Loik 18'; Martelli 22', 57'; Castigliano 66'; Menti II 77'	Report	38' Pernigo; 80' Bertoni	Stadium: Stadio Filadelfia; Referee: Vincenzo Orlandini

==== Friendlies ====
After a record campaign, Torino was invited by the Paulista Football League (Federação Paulista de Futebol-FPF), to play several friendly matches in São Paulo, Brazil.

19 July 1948	Palmeiras	1–1	Torino	São Paulo
				Stadium: Morumbi

21 July 1948	Corinthians	2–1	Torino	São Paulo
				Stadium: Morumbi

25 July 1948	Portuguesa	1–4	Torino	São Paulo
				Stadium: Morumbi

29 July 1948	São Paulo	2–2	Torino	São Paulo
				Stadium: Morumbi

== Statistics ==
=== Squad statistics ===
Competition	Points	Home						Away						Total						GD
Competition	Points	G	V	D	L	Gs	Ga	G	V	D	L	Gs	Ga	G	V	D	L	Gs	Ga	GD
Serie A	65	20	19	1	0	87	17	20	10	6	4	38	16	40	29	7	4	125	33	+92

=== Players statistics ===
==== Appearances ====
- 40. (Italy) Valerio Bacigalupo
- 39. (Italy) Aldo Ballarin
- 29. (Italy) Eusebio Castigliano
- 15. (Italy) Josef Fabian
- 16. (Italy) Pietro Ferraris
- 36. (Italy) Guglielmo Gabetto
- 33. (Italy) Giuseppe Grezar
- 33. (Italy) Ezio Loik
- 17. (Italy) Virgilio Maroso
- 27. (Italy) Danilo Martelli
- 37. (Italy) Valentino Mazzola
- 38. (Italy) Romeo Menti
- 17. (Italy) Franco Ossola
- 39. (Italy) Mario Rigamonti
- 24. (Italy) Sauro Tomà

==== Goalscorers ====
- 25. (Italy) Valentino Mazzola
- 23. (Italy) Guglielmo Gabetto
- 16. (Italy) Romeo Menti
- 16. (Italy) Ezio Loik
- 9. (Italy) Danilo Martelli
- 9. (Italy) Franco Ossola
- 9. (Italy) Josef Fabian
- 1. (Italy) Aldo Ballarin
- 7. (Italy) Eusebio Castigliano
- 3. (Italy) Pietro Ferraris
- 5. (Italy) Giuseppe Grezar
- 1. (Italy) Virgilio Maroso
