= Piero Operto =

Italian footballer (1926–1949)

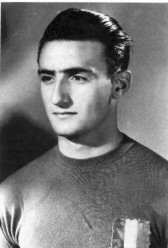

Personal information
- Date of birth: 20 December 1926
- Place of birth: Turin, Italy
- Date of death: 4 May 1949 (aged 22)
- Place of death: Superga, Italy
- Position(s): Defender

Senior career*
Years	Team	Apps	(Gls)
1946–1948	Casale	71	(4)
1948–1949	Torino	11	(0)
- *Club domestic league appearances and goals

Piero Operto (20 December 1926 – 4 May 1949) was an Italian footballer who played as a defender.

== Career ==
Operto came from Casale in the summer of 1948, after two good seasons with four goals. He was not yet 22 years old when he joined the Grande Torino, discovered by Mario Sperone, who put several pressures on the leadership to have him at Torino. Due to Virgilio Maroso's injury, Operto found room in the team in the first matches of the 1948–49 championship. He debuted in Turin's internal race against Roma at the Stadio Filadelfia on 3 October 1948. Torino won 4–0, and Operto's performance impressed even those who did not know him yet. At the end of the season he collected 11 appearances; Maroso's return to the club for a long time stopped him from playing with more continuity. With Guglielmo Gabetto, he was the only original Torinese in the team. Although he did not play much, he was summoned for the friendly match between Torino and Benfica. He lost his life on the return trip from Lisbon with his teammates in the Superga air disaster on 4 May 1949. He was the younger brother of player Giovanni Operto. Piero Operto was buried at the Cimitero Monumentale in Turin.

== Style of play ==
Operto played as a left-back. He had decent physical strength, and he often went on the left wing to launch balls and stretch the team. His best feature was the headshot, which he used on several occasions, given his excellent elevation.

== Honours ==
Torino

- Serie A: 1948–49
