= Sauro Tomà =

Italian footballer

Personal information
- Full name: Sauro Tomà
- Date of birth: 4 December 1925
- Place of birth: La Spezia, Italy
- Date of death: 10 April 2018 (aged 92)
- Place of death: Turin, Italy
- Position: Full-back

Senior career*
| Years | Team | Apps | (Gls) |
| 1942–1943 | Rapallo Ruentes | | |
| 1945–1946 | Vogherese | | |
| 1946–1947 | Spezia | 37 | (0) |
| 1947–1951 | Torino | 77 | (0) |
| 1951–1952 | Brescia | 24 | (0) |
| 1953–1955 | Bari | 36 | (0) |
- * Club domestic league appearances and goals

Sauro Tomà (4 December 1925 – 10 April 2018) was an Italian footballer who played as a full-back.

Tomà began his career with Rapallo Ruentes. After playing for Vogherese and Spezia, he joined Torino in 1947, where he won two Serie A titles. He escaped the Superga air disaster in 1949 due to an injured meniscus, which forced him to retire at the age of thirty, in 1955.

== Club career ==
=== Spezia ===
Born in Rebocco, Spezia, he began his football career in Rapallo Ruentes. He went on to play for Vogherese, and then for Spezia, after being spotted by a club official of the later during a friendly match. He preferred playing as a goalkeeper, however, as there were many players challenging for the role, he became a full-back.

=== Torino ===
He was noted by observers of many teams, amongst them Juventus and Genoa, but Ferruccio Novo contacted the Ligurian team management and convinced him to join Torino.

His move to Torino was initially negative, as the transfer was blocked due to alleged lung problems. However, Tomà underwent medical examinations of his own and showed excellent health. Torino had attempted to go back on their deal, as they considered his purchase too challenging (Torino had to exchange five players to Spezia), but Tomà won out. After an immediate apology from Novo, Tomà began his career at Torino as a substitute of Virgilio Maroso, who suffered from continual muscle problems.

He was a close friend of Valentino Mazzola, the captain of Torino was the first person he met in Turin. Tomà would be the only player to stay close to Mazzola in the period in which he divorced from his first wife (an action disliked by everyone), in order to marry his second wife. He was nicknamed by his Torino teammates "due metri e settanta" (2.7 meters) because he had difficulty sweeping through balls inside his own area; those he swept often did not exceed three meters.

In the 1948–49 season, he suffered a knee injury which led to a long stretch of absence. As Torino were leaving for Lisbon to play against Benfica in a farewell game of Jose Ferreira, the Torino doctor only allowed Maroso to play. Upon returning to Turin, the plane crashed on the embankment behind the Basilica of Superga, killing all of his teammates.

He played for more season with Torino, but failed to find a serenity of mind as the only "survivor" of the team. There were also disagreements within the club, with Ferruccio Novo making a series of inconsistent purchases with the hope of rebuilding the team. Tomà moved to Brescia in 1951, and retired from football in 1955 after spending two seasons with Bari.

== Post-career ==
Tomà lived near the Stadio Filadelfia in Turin, and participated in many initiatives involving the Grande Torino.

Having been the only living player of the Grande Torino, he wrote many books as a testimony to the team, most notably Me Grand Turin, in which he wrote about his entire football career, from beginning to his experience in Turin.

== Honours ==
=== Club ===
Torino

- Serie A (2): 1947–48, 1948–49

A.S. Bari

- Serie D (1): 1953–54
- Serie C (1): 1954–55

== Bibliography ==
- Vecchio Cuore Granata, Sauro Tomà, in collaboration with Sergio Barbero, Graphot Editrice, October 1988.
- Me Grand Turin, Sauro Tomà, Graphot edition, 1998.
- Mario Pennacchia (2011). ISBN (ed.). La vita disperata del portiere Moro. Milano: Massimo Raffaeli.
