= Ballarin =

Ballarin is an Italian surname. Notable people with the surname include:

- Aldo Ballarin (1922–1949), Italian footballer
- Ángela Abós Ballarín (1934–2022), Spanish writer and politician
- Dino Ballarin (1925–1949), Italian footballer, brother of Aldo
- Silvio Ballarin (1901–1969), Italian mathematician and professor
