= Renato Gandolfi =

Italian footballer

Personal information
- Date of birth: 17 November 1925
- Place of birth: Turin, Italy
- Date of death: 23 September 2011 (aged 85)
- Place of death: Genoa, Italy
- Position: Goalkeeper

Youth career
- 1940–1946: Torino

Senior career*
Years	Team	Apps	(Gls)
1946–1948	→ Carrarese (loan)	14	(0)
1948–1950	Clodia	7	(0)
1950–1952	Torino	58	(0)
1952–1953	Genoa	7	(0)
1953–1954	Legnano (loan)	22	(0)
1954–1955	Lazio (loan)	0	(0)
1955–1959	Genoa	69	(0)
1959–1961	Piacenza	46	(0)
Total		223	(0)
- * Club domestic league appearances and goals

Renato Gandolfi (17 November 1927 – 30 April 2011) was an Italian professional footballer who played as a goalkeeper.

== Club career ==
He entered the Torino youth team in 1940, then was loaned to Carrarese for two seasons, in Serie C. Back in Turin, he was part of the Grande Torino in the 1948–49 season as the reserve goalkeeper: second to Valerio Bacigalupo and held back by a broken collarbone. He played two games in that season's Serie A, playing as a starter on 28 November 1948 against Triestina. During a trip to Portugal, he was forced to leave his place to Dino Ballarin, the third goalkeeper, under pressure from his brother Aldo: this prevented him from dying in the Superga air disaster.

He remained at Torino with the only other surviving player, Sauro Tomà, the reserve of Giuseppe Moro in the league from 1948 to 1949, and in 1950 was sold to Legnano, in Serie B.

With Legnano he won promotion to Serie A and provided particularly adept at parrying penalty kicks: in the 1951–52 season he parried five. In 1952 came back down to Serie B with Genoa, winning another promotion to Serie A as the reserve of Angelo Franzosi; he debuted with the rossoblu due to Franzosi's injury, in the heat of a match between Genoa and Legnano of 5 April 1953. In subsequent seasons Genoa loaned him first to Legnano, in Serie A, and then in December 1954, Lazio, where he was never used and deployed only in reserves. Finally he returned to Genoa, where he confirmed his reputation as a skilled goalkeeper on penalty kicks, parrying, among others, a penalty in a decisive game for salvation against Verona, in the 1957–58 season.

He totalled 118 appearances in Serie A.

== Honours ==
Torino

- Serie A: 1948–49

Genoa

- Serie B: 1952–53

== Bibliography ==
- Franco Tomati; Gianni Brera (1992). Genoa Amore mio. Nuove Edizioni Periodiche.
