= Roger Grava =

Italian footballer (1922–1949)

Ruggero Grava
Personal information
- Full name: Revelli Ruggero Grava
- Date of birth: 26 April 1922
- Place of birth: Claut, Italy
- Date of death: 4 May 1949 (aged 27)
- Place of death: Superga, Turin, Italy
- Position: Striker

Youth career
- AS Roma Paris
- AS Meudon

Senior career*
Years	Team	Apps	(Gls)
1942–1943	Amiens AC		
1943	ÉF Nancy-Lorraine		
1943–1944	EF Bordeaux-Guyenne		
1944–1945	Bordeaux	12	(5)
1945–1948	Roubaix-Tourcoing	84	(30)
1948–1949	Torino	1	(0)
- * Club domestic league appearances and goals

Ruggero Grava (26 April 1922 – 4 May 1949) was an Italian footballer who played as a striker.

He moved to France at the age of 1. He began his playing career with Amiens AC and played for ÉF Nancy-Lorraine, EF Bordeaux-Guyenne, Bordeaux and Roubaix-Tourcoing in France. In 1948, he moved to Torino, with another Frenchman of Italian descent, Émile Bongiorni of RC Paris. They both died in the Superga air disaster on 4 May 1949.

== Honours degree ==
Roubaix-Tourcoing

- Ligue 1: 1946–47

Torino

- Serie A: 1948–49
