= Émile Bongiorni =

French footballer (1921–1949)

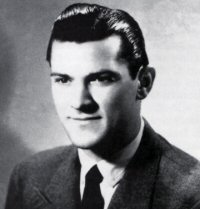

Personal information
- Date of birth: 19 March 1921
- Place of birth: Boulogne-Billancourt, France
- Date of death: 4 May 1949 (aged 28)
- Place of death: Superga, Turin, Italy
- Position: Striker

Senior career*
Years	Team	Apps	(Gls)
1938–1939	CA Paris	37	(18)
1944–1948	RC Paris	89	(43)
1948–1949	Torino F.C.	8	(2)

International career
1945–1948	France	5	(2)
- * Club domestic league appearances and goals

Émile Bongiorni (19 March 1921 – 4 May 1949) was a French footballer who played as a striker

He played for RC Paris where he was capped five times for France. In 1948, he moved to Torino F.C., with another Frenchman of Italian descent, Roger Grava of CO Roubaix-Tourcoing. They both died in the Superga air disaster on 4 May 1949.

== Honours ==
Torino

- Serie A: 1948–49
