= Ernő Egri Erbstein =

Hungarian footballer (1898–1949)

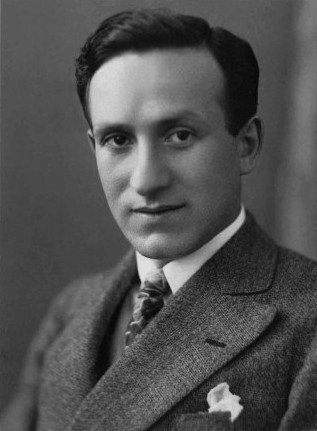
- Egri Erbstein c. 1938

Personal information
- Full name: Ernő Egri Erbstein
- Date of birth: 13 May 1898
- Place of birth: Nagyvárad, Austria-Hungary
- Date of death: 4 May 1949 (aged 50)
- Place of death: Superga, Italy
- Position: Wing half

Senior career*
Years	Team	Apps	(Gls)
1915–1922	Budapesti AK		
1922	Hakoah Arad		
1922–1924	Budapesti AK		
1924–1925	Olympia Fiume	18	(5)
1925–1926	Vicenza	28	(2)
1926–1928	Húsos		

Managerial career
- 1928–1929: Bari
- 1929–1930: Nocerina
- 1930–1932: Cagliari
- 1932–1933: Bari
- 1933–1938: Lucchese
- 1938–1939: Torino
- 1946–1949: Torino (technical director)
- * Club domestic league appearances and goals

Ernő Egri Erbstein (Hungarian: Erbstein Ernő), also known as Ernest and Ernesto Erbstein (13 May 1898 – 4 May 1949), was a Hungarian football player and manager. He carried out his footballing activities in several countries and was most noted for his association with Italian football.

== Biography ==
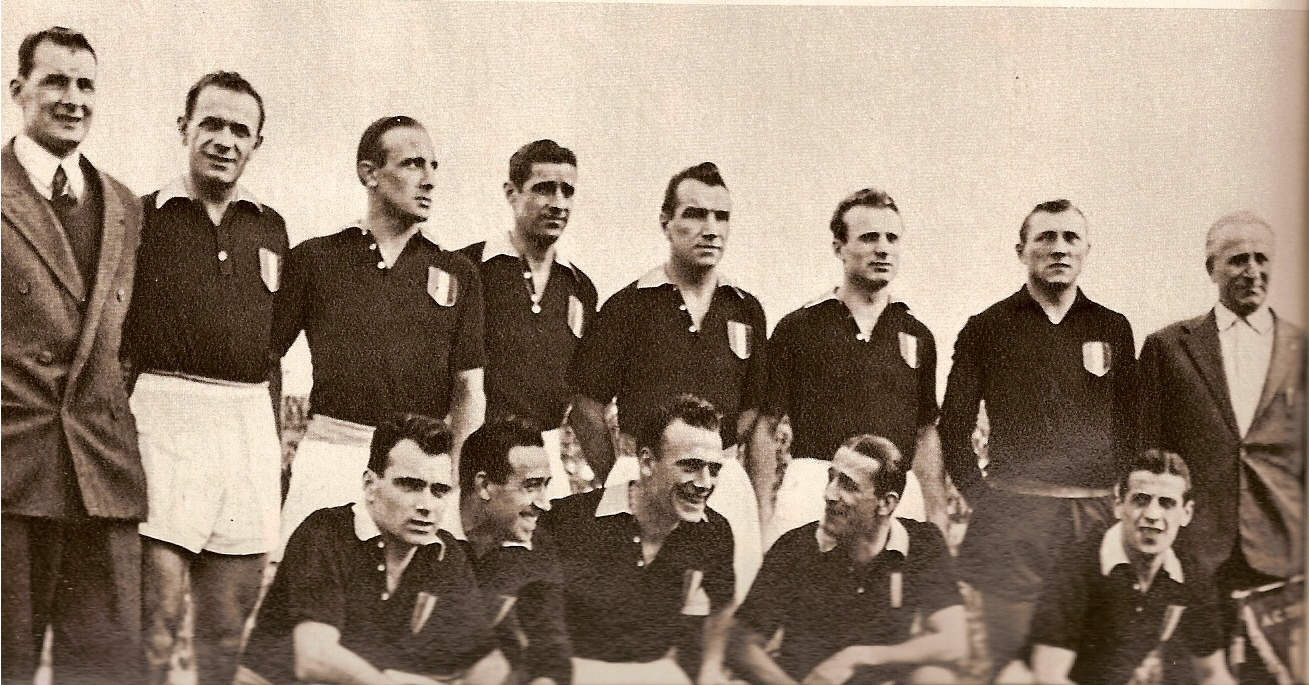
Erbstein, first on the right with the Grande Torino

Erbstein carried out the majority of his playing career with Budapesti AK, with whom he spent almost a decade, either side of a brief spell with Hakoah Arad in 1922. After first getting a taste for Italian football with Olympia Fiume (Fiume was the Italian name for the present-day Croatian city of Rijeka) he moved to Vicenza for a season.

As a manager Bari gave him his first chance, but his forward-thinking tactics were ineffective with the group of players at that time, but the fast flowing attractive football caught the eye of the Italian public despite Bari's relegation which saw him relieved of his duties. Short spells at Nocerina, Cagliari and Bari again before moving on to Lucchese where he spent five years gaining promotion to 'Serie A' during this period. Erbstein moved to Torino after that, but because of World War II and the fact that he was Jewish meant that the implementation of the 'Manifesto of Race' which stripped Jewish people of their right to work. Despite these restrictions, he continued to offer his advice through an unofficial role, before leaving Italy and returning to Hungary when it became too unsafe to remain.

He was sent to a Nazi forced labor camp near Budapest. He escaped in December 1944, just before he was about to be sent to Auschwitz concentration camp, together with Béla Guttmann, another famous Jewish-Hungarian player and coach.

After the war Erbstein rejoined Torino, this time in the capacity of a trainer; this was one of the most noted spells in Italian football where they secured the Serie A title. During this successful period, this Torino side became known as Grande Torino. Erbstein (as technical director) along with Englishman Leslie Lievesley (as trainer) were co-managers during the 1948–49 season. Torino were defending champions of Italy and on track to progress further. Disaster struck on 4 May 1949 when Erbstein and the majority of the Torino team died in the Superga air disaster.

== Honours ==
=== Technical director ===
Torino

- Serie A: 1947–48

=== Manager ===
Lucchese

- Serie B: 1935–36

Torino

- Serie A: 1948–49

=== Individual ===
- Torino FC Hall of Fame: 2019
- Italian Football Hall of Fame: 2022
