= Fadini =

Fadini is an Italian surname. Notable people with the surname include:

- Emilia Fadini (1930–2021), Spanish-born Italian harpsichordist, musicologist, and teacher
- Rubens Fadini (1927–1949), Italian footballer
  - Stadio Rubens Fadini
