= Cavazzuti =

Surname list

Cavazzuti is an Italian surname. Notable people with the surname include:

- Armando Cavazzuti (1929–2014), Italian footballer and manager
- Cinzia Cavazzuti (born 1973), Italian judoka
- Filippo Cavazzuti (1942–2021), Italian politician
