= Danilo Martelli =

Italian footballer (1927–1949)

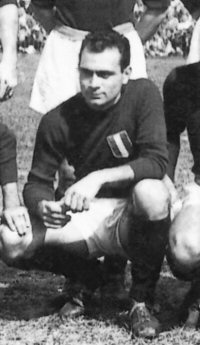

Personal information
- Date of birth: 27 May 1927
- Place of birth: Castellucchio, Italy
- Date of death: 4 May 1949 (aged 21)
- Place of death: Superga, Italy
- Position: Midfielder

Youth career
- 1940–1941: Marzotto Manerbio

Senior career*
Years	Team	Apps	(Gls)
1941–1946	Brescia	99	(26)
1946–1949	Torino	72	(10)
Total		171	(36)
- * Club domestic league appearances and goals

Danilo Martelli (27 May 1927 – 4 May 1949) was an Italian footballer who played as a midfielder.

Martelli began his career with Marzotto Manerbio and later Brescia. In 1946, he moved to Torino, where he won three Serie A titles. He died in 1949 in the Superga air disaster.

== Club career ==
=== Brescia ===
Martelli began his career with Marzotto Manerbio in Serie C. In the 1940–41 season, he moved to Brescia, where he played in Serie B for two seasons, and demonstrated an ability to score goals. In 1943, the Rondinelle won promotion to the top flight of Italian football, but this would be postponed due to the Second World War. In the first post-war championship, Brescia won fourth place in the group of Northern Italy but then lost a tie with A.C. Milan for the final round.

=== Torino ===
Martelli came to the fore and was noticed by executives of Torino, who signed him in 1946. With 72 appearances and 10 goals, he contributed to the conquest of three Serie A titles of the Grande Torino in 1947, 1948 and 1949. Valentino Mazzola advised him always to be more "aggressive".

As Torino required to sell a player to balance their finances, they thought of selling Martelli, a rising star that interested many teams. His friends, however, organised a fundraiser to raise half the amount other teams would pay for him to remain at Torino.

Along with Valerio Bacigalupo and Mario Rigamonti, he was also part of the so-called Trio Nizza, three players of the Grande Torino who lived together in a small apartment in Via Nizza in Turin.

Martelli was buried at the cemetery of his native region, Castellucchio.

== Legacy ==
The stadium of Mantua was renamed after him after the Superga air disaster.

Later, two football teams of the province of Cremona (Piadena) and Mantua (Castellucchio), were founded or changed their name to remember his football career: the G.S. Danilo Martelli of Piadena because when he came from Castellucchio he took the train to Brescia and down to Piadena, where he had many friends and former teammates with whom he played several tournaments during the summer; the US Danilo Martelli of Castellucchio, his hometown.

== Style of play ==
He was a defensive midfielder, but could also play as a full-back on either flank.

== Honours ==
Torino

- Serie A: 1946–47, 1947–48, 1948–49

== Bibliography ==
- Me Grand Turin, Sauro Tomà, Graphot edition, 1998.
- 1950/2000 Gruppo Sportivo Danilo Martelli Piadena - Cinquant'anni di calcio, amicizia e impegno - edited by Pro Loco and the community of Piadena, July 2000.
