= Umberto Motto =

Italian footballer (born 1930)

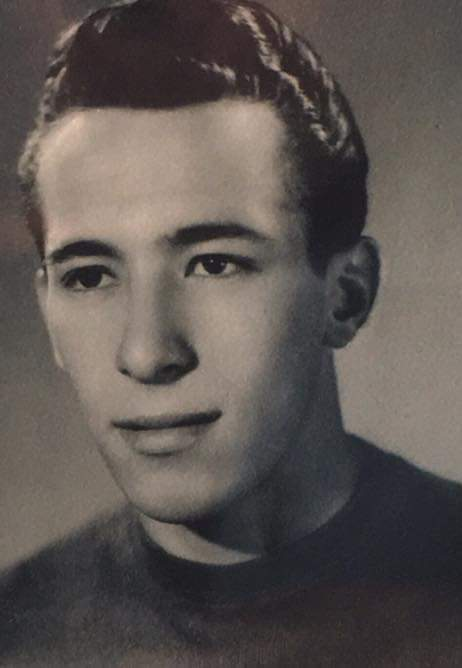

Personal information
- Date of birth: 22 July 1930 (age 96)
- Place of birth: Turin, Italy
- Position: Defender

Youth career
- Torino

Senior career*
Years	Team	Apps	(Gls)
1948–1952	Torino	5	(0)
1952–1954	Alessandria	1	(0)
- * Club domestic league appearances and goals

Umberto Motto (born 22 July 1930) is an Italian former professional footballer who played as a defender.

== Career ==
Captain of Torino's youth team that played all of Torino's last 4 1948–49 Serie A matches with the senior squad following the Superga air disaster.

He continued with the Granata into the subsequent season, adding another Serie A appearance.

In 2023, he was inducted into Torino FC Hall of Fame.

== Honours ==
Torino

- Serie A: 1948–49

Individual

- Torino FC Hall of Fame: 2023
