= Rubens Fadini =

Italian footballer

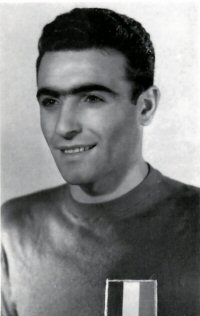

Personal information
- Full name: Rubens Fadini
- Date of birth: 10 June 1927
- Place of birth: Jolanda di Savoia, Italy
- Date of death: 4 May 1949 (aged 21)
- Place of death: Superga, Italy
- Position: Midfielder

Youth career
- 1941–1943: Dopolavoro Ceretti & Tanfani
- 1945–1948: Gallaratese

Senior career*
Years	Team	Apps	(Gls)
1948–1949	Torino	10	(1)
Total		10	(1)
- * Club domestic league appearances and goals

Rubens Fadini (10 June 1927 – 4 May 1949) was an Italian professional footballer who played as a midfielder.

== Club career ==
Born in Jolanda di Savoia, in the province of Ferrara, he emigrated to Milan at a young age with his family. He began playing football in the Milanese youth league: the Dopolavoro Ceretti & Tanfani di Milano.

With Ceretti he won two regional titles in Milan in 1941–42 and 1942–43 and the title of Regionale della Sezione Propaganda (losing the overall title of the regional championship in a youth match on 18 July 1943, defeated by A.C. Milan 6–1 on the field of Pirelli alla Bicocca).

After the war, he was signed by Gallaratese, who competed in the Alta Italia. He stayed here for three years.

He was acquired by Torino in his early twenties. In the final game of the season, before the Superga air disaster, he replaced an injured Valentino Mazzola against Inter Milan in Milan.

He died in the Superga air disaster aged 21. He had played 10 games in Serie A, scoring a goal in a home win by 4–1 against Milan on 6 March 1949.

Fadini was buried in the cemetery of Arcore.

== Honours ==
Torino

- Serie A: 1948–49
