= Franco Ossola =

Italian footballer (1921–1949)

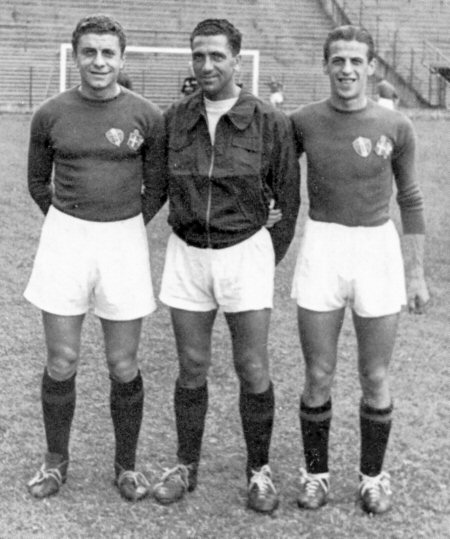
- Franco Ossola (right) with Cesare Gallea (left) and Antonio Janni (center)

Personal information
- Date of birth: 23 August 1921
- Place of birth: Varese, Italy
- Date of death: 4 May 1949 (aged 27)
- Place of death: Superga, Italy
- Position: Forward

Youth career
- Varese

Senior career*
Years	Team	Apps	(Gls)
1938–1939	Varese	9	(3)
1939–1949	Torino	176	(86)
Total		184	(89)

International career
1943	Italy U21	1	(0)
- * Club domestic league appearances and goals

Franco Ossola (23 August 1921 – 4 May 1949) was an Italian footballer who played as a forward.

With 85 goals, Ossola is the ninth-highest scorer in the history of Torino behind Adolfo Baloncieri (100). He died on 4 May 1949 in the Superga air disaster when the Fiat G.212 which carried the celebrated Grande Torino team crashed into the retaining wall of the Basilica di Superga. The Stadio Franco Ossola in Varese is named after him.

His half-brother was Aldo Ossola, a basketball player of the Ignis Varese in the 1970s.

== Club career ==
=== Varese ===
Noticed as a young boy by the coach of Varese, Antonio Janni, he played for the senior team in Serie C. Initially, Janni did not allow him to play as he intended to sell him to Serie A club Torino, but was forced to send him on the pitch because of a starting player's injury. Janni contacted Ferruccio Novo, the president of Torino, who bought him for 55,000 lire.

=== Torino ===
At Torino, he arrived at the age of 18 in 1939 and debuted in Serie A on 4 February 1940. Early in his career at Torino, he suffered from the presence of Pietro Ferraris, who occupied the left wing. He eventually became a starter with the number 11 jersey, and played 181 games and scored 85 goals in Serie A, the 1944 Campionato Alta Italia and the National Division.

He was buried at the Cimitero Monumentale in Turin.

== Trivia ==
Franco Ossola was played by Gualtiero Burzi in the television miniseries The Grande Torino.

== Career statistics ==
=== Club ===
Appearances and goals by club, season and competition
Club	Season	League		
Club	Season	Division	Apps	Goals
Varese	1938–39	Serie C	9	3
Torino	1939–40	Serie A	4	0
Torino	1940–41	Serie A	22	15
Torino	1941–42	Serie A	13	7
Torino	1942–43	Serie A	12	6
Torino	1944–45	Campionato Alta Italia	24	14
Torino	1945–46	Divisione Nazionale	30	11
Torino	1946–47	Serie A	29	13
Torino	1947–48	Serie A	17	9
Torino	1948–49	Serie A	25	11
Torino	Total		176	86
Career total			185	89

== Honours ==
Torino

- Serie A: 1942–43, 1945–46, 1946–47, 1947–48, 1948–49
- Coppa Italia: 1942–43
