= Július Schubert =

Slovak-Hungarian footballer (1922–1949)

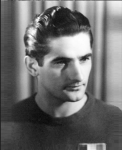

Personal information
- Date of birth: 12 December 1922
- Place of birth: Budapest, Hungary
- Date of death: 4 May 1949 (aged 26)
- Place of death: Superga, Italy
- Position: Midfielder

Senior career*
Years	Team	Apps	(Gls)
1944–1945	Ganz	8	(4)
1945–1946	Kőbányai Barátság	32	(34)
1947–1948	Slovan Bratislava		
1948–1949	Torino	5	(1)

International career
1948	Czechoslovakia	2	(1)
- * Club domestic league appearances and goals

Gyula Subert (better known as Július Schubert or Giulio Schubert; 12 December 1922 – 4 May 1949) was a Slovak-Hungarian footballer who played as a midfielder. He played twice for the Czechoslovakia national team and played club football for Slovan Bratislava and Torino. He died in the Superga air disaster.

== Honours ==
Torino

- Serie A: 1948–49
