= André Grillon =

French footballer and manager (1921-2003)

Personal information
- Date of birth: 1 November 1921
- Place of birth: Paris, France
- Date of death: 20 June 2003 (aged 81)
- Place of death: Amiens, France
- Position: Defender

Youth career
- Clichy
- FC Levallois

Senior career*
Years	Team	Apps	(Gls)
1943–1944	EF Bordeaux-Guyenne		
1945–1949	Stade Français	120	(4)
1949–1951	RC Paris	40	(1)
1951–1952	Lyon	29	(2)
1952–1954	Stade Français	56	(1)
1954–1955	Caen		

International career
1946–1951	France	15	(0)

Managerial career
- 1953–1954: Stade Français
- 1955–1958: Caen
- 1958–1964: Le Mans
- 1964–1968: Annecy
- 1968: France Olympic
- 1968–1977: Amiens
- 1977–1980: Lucé
- * Club domestic league appearances and goals

André Grillon (1 November 1921 – 20 June 2003) was a French footballer and football manager. He was capped 15 times for France.

== Career ==
Grillon played as a defender, for EF Bordeaux-Guyenne, Stade Français, RC Paris, Lyon and Caen, where he ended his playing career.

=== International ===
He was capped 15 times for France. He played his first match in 1946 against Czechoslovakia and his last match in 1951 against Austria.

=== Coaching ===
He began his coaching career with Stade Français and also coached Caen, US Le Mans, Annecy, Amiens and Lucé. He also managed the French Olympic team at the 1968 Summer Olympics in Mexico City.
