= Romeo Menti =

Italian footballer (1919–1949)

Personal information
- Date of birth: 5 September 1919
- Place of birth: Vicenza, Italy
- Date of death: 4 May 1949 (aged 29)
- Place of death: Superga, Italy
- Position: Forward

Senior career*
Years	Team	Apps	(Gls)
1934–1938	L.R. Vicenza Virtus	82	(34)
1938–1941	Fiorentina	75	(44)
1941–1943	Torino	50	(23)
1944	→ Milan	9	(1)
1944–1945	→ Stabia	?	(?)
1945–1946	→ Fiorentina	18	(7)
1946–1949	Torino	81	(31)

International career
1947–1949	Italy	7	(5)
- * Club domestic league appearances and goals

Romeo Menti (Italian pronunciation: [roˈmɛːo ˈmenti]; 5 September 1919 – 4 May 1949) was an Italian footballer who played as a forward. He scored 145 goals in a career that spanned fifteen years.

== Career ==
Born in Vicenza, Menti debuted for his hometown's Serie C club in 1935, in the same stadium that was to be dedicated to him a few years later.

His older brothers Mario Menti and Umberto Menti and nephew Luigi Menti (son of Mario) all played football professionally, with Umberto playing for Juventus FC, S.S.C. Napoli and A.C. Milan. To distinguish them, Mario was known as Menti I, Umberto as Menti II, Romeo as Menti III, and Luigi as Menti IV. In some sources, Mario was ignored and Umberto and Romeo were listed as Menti I and Menti II respectively.

In 1938 he was sold to Fiorentina, where he played for three seasons before moving to Torino F.C. His abilities became evident also with national team, for which he received 5 caps with 7 goals.

Menti played for the then almost unbeatable Torino (dubbed Grande Torino, "Great Torino") until his death, except for the 1945–46 season, when he played again for Fiorentina. Menti died in 1949 with almost his entire team in the Superga air disaster, after scoring the last goal of "Grande Torino" in Lisbon.

== Honours ==
Fiorentina

- Serie B: 1938–39
- Coppa Italia: 1939–40

Torino

- Serie A: 1942–43, 1946–47, 1947–48, 1948–49
- Coppa Italia: 1942–43
