= Eusebio Castigliano =

Italian footballer (1921–1949)

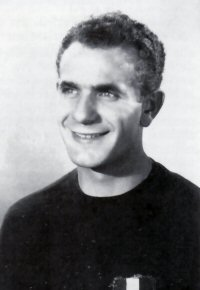

Personal information
- Date of birth: 9 February 1921
- Place of birth: Vercelli, Italy
- Date of death: 4 May 1949 (aged 28)
- Place of death: Superga, Italy
- Position: Midfielder

Senior career*
Years	Team	Apps	(Gls)
1939–1941	Pro Vercelli	28	(18)
1941–1943	Spezia	63	(25)
1944	Biellese	15	(8)
1945–1949	Torino	115	(36)
Total		221	(87)

International career
1945–1949	Italy	7	(1)
- * Club domestic league appearances and goals

Eusebio Castigliano (Italian pronunciation: [euˈzɛːbjo kastiʎˈʎaːno]; 9 February 1921 – 4 May 1949) was an Italian footballer who played as a midfielder.

== Club career ==
Castigliano played professional club football for Pro Vercelli, Spezia, Biellese and Torino where he was part of the Grande Torino team, and won four consecutive league titles.

On 4 May 1949, Castigliano died in the Superga air disaster.

== International career ==
Castigliano earned seven caps for Italy between 1945 and 1949, scoring one goal.

== Honours ==
Torino

- Serie A: 1944–45, 1946–47, 1947–48, 1948–49
