= Arnaldo Lucentini =

Italian footballer (1930-1981)

Personal information
- Full name: Arnaldo Lucentini
- Date of birth: 7 July 1930
- Place of birth: Tolentino, Italy
- Date of death: 6 August 1981 (aged 51)
- Place of death: Gela, Italy
- Position: Midfielder

Senior career*
Years	Team	Apps	(Gls)
1947–1948	Tolentino	?	(?)
1948–1952	Sampdoria	110	(18)
1952–1953	Fiorentina	23	(1)
1953–1956	Triestina	89	(14)
1956–1958	Lazio	14	(2)
1958–1960	Catanzaro	16	(2)
1960–1962	Arezzo	45	(1)

International career
1951	Italy	1	(0)
- * Club domestic league appearances and goals

Arnaldo Lucentini (Italian pronunciation: [arˈnaldo lutʃenˈtiːni]; 7 July 1930 – 6 August 1981) was an Italian footballer who played as a midfielder. On 25 November 1951, he represented the Italy national football team on the occasion of a friendly match against Switzerland in a 1–1 away draw.
