= Luigi Giuliano (footballer) =

Italian footballer and manager (1930–1993)

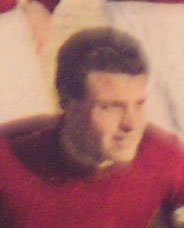
- Giuliano wearing the Torino uniform

Personal information
- Full name: Luigi Giuliano
- Date of birth: 16 August 1930
- Place of birth: Vercelli, Italy
- Date of death: December 1993
- Place of death: Rome, Italy
- Height: 1.72 m (5 ft 7 1/2 in)
- Position: Defensive midfielder

Youth career
- Pro Vercelli
- Torino

Senior career*
Years	Team	Apps	(Gls)
1945–1948	Pro Vercelli	5	(1)
1948–1954	Torino	125	(12)
1954–1962	Roma	142	(9)

International career
1955	Italy	1	(0)

Managerial career
- 1966–1967: Egaleo
- * Club domestic league appearances and goals

Luigi Giuliano (Italian: [luˈiːdʒi dʒuˈljaːno]; 16 August 1930 – 23 December 1993) was an Italian professional footballer who played as a midfielder.

== Club career ==
He had the distinction of scoring in each of his first three Serie A games in the 1948/49 season. He was the only youth team player who was playing regularly on the first squad of A.C. Torino. Because of a delay he had in obtaining a passport, he did not join the team on its trip to Lisbon, which led to the Superga air disaster, in which the first squad perished.

His last two seasons with A.S. Roma were hampered by serious knee injuries, but that did not stop him from playing on the team that won the 1960–61 Inter-Cities Fairs Cup; he scored a goal in the competition against Union Saint-Gilloise and played in the final. Overall, he played for 14 seasons in the Serie A for A.C. Torino and A.S. Roma (267 games, 21 goals).

== International career ==
He played his only game for the Italy national football team on 27 November 1955 against Hungary.
