= Charles Adcock =

English footballer

Personal information
- Full name: Charles Norman Adcock
- Date of birth: 21 February 1923
- Place of birth: Boston, England
- Date of death: 9 December 1998 (aged 75)
- Place of death: Boston, England
- Position: Striker

Senior career*
Years	Team	Apps	(Gls)
1946–1949	Padova	84	(33)
1949–1950	Triestina	17	(4)
1950–1951	Treviso	9	(1)
1953-1954	Peterborough United	10	(5)
- * Club domestic league appearances and goals

Charles Norman Adcock (21 February 1923 – 9 December 1998) was an English association football striker born in Boston, Lincolnshire.

Adcock was the first Englishman to play professional football in Italy. He joined Serie B club Padova in 1946 after being spotted playing in exhibition matches for the British Army. After winning promotion in his second season, he went on to play 40 matches, scoring 11 goals in the Italian Serie A from 1948 to 1950, with Padova and later Triestina. In 1948, AC Milan had been poised to sign Adcock to lead their attack, but Padova lodged a complaint about Milan's illegal approach and the transfer was blocked.

In 1950, coach Nereo Rocco departed Triestina for Serie B Treviso and took Adcock with him. The 1950-51 season was Adcock's final active season in Italian football. When he returned to the UK in 1953, he played for non-league Peterborough United for a season.

Despite his success in Italy, Adcock never played a professional match in England.
