= Guido Vandone =

Italian footballer (1930–2019)

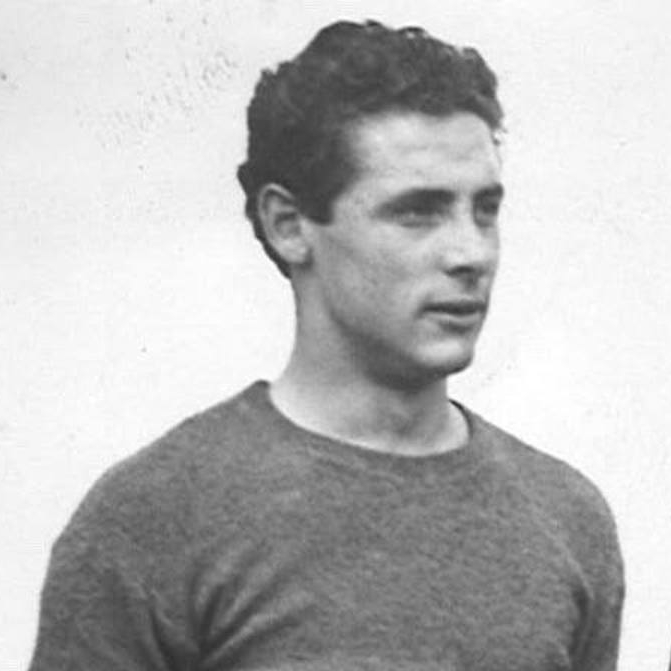
- Guido Vandone in 1949

Personal information
- Date of birth: 18 February 1930
- Place of birth: Turin, Italy
- Date of death: 31 July 2019 (aged 89)
- Position: Goalkeeper

Senior career*
Years	Team	Apps	(Gls)
1948–1950	Torino	4	(0)
1950–1951	Savona	21	(0)
1953–1954	Prato	29	(0)
1954–1955	Lecce	25	(0)
1955–1956	Cuneo		
- * Club domestic league appearances and goals

Guido Vandone (18 February 1930 – 31 July 2019) was an Italian professional footballer who played as a goalkeeper for Torino, Savona, Prato, Lecce and Cuneo.
