= Arnaldo Salvi =

Italian footballer (1915-2002)

Personal information
- Date of birth: 21 November 1915
- Place of birth: Bergamo, Italy
- Date of death: 4 October 2002 (aged 86)
- Height: 1.65 m (5 ft 5 in)
- Position: Midfielder

Senior career*
Years	Team	Apps	(Gls)
1932–1934	Ardens Bergamo		
1934–1941	Atalanta	101	(14)
1941–1942	Ambrosiana-Inter	14	(2)
1942–1943	Cremonese	22	(2)
1943–1944	Atalanta	14	(2)
1944–1945	Lecco		
1945–1946	Brescia	24	(9)
1946–1948	Atalanta	46	(12)
1948–1949	Palazzolo	15	(8)
- * Club domestic league appearances and goals

Arnaldo Salvi (21 November 1915 – 4 October 2002) was an Italian professional football player.
