= Renzo Merlin =

Italian footballer

Personal information
- Date of birth: 27 September 1923
- Place of birth: Milan, Italy
- Date of death: 5 November 2003 (aged 80)
- Position: Midfielder

Senior career*
Years	Team	Apps	(Gls)
1942–1944	Pirelli Milano		
1945–1946	Pro Sesto		
1946–1947	Taranto	32	(12)
1947–1948	Salernitana	21	(10)
1948–1949	Lucchese	38	(9)
1949–1953	Roma	68	(15)
1953–1955	Empoli	66	(13)
1955–1957	Siena	38	(17)
- * Club domestic league appearances and goals

Renzo Merlin (27 September 1923 – 5 November 2003) was an Italian professional football player.

He played for 5 seasons (108 games, 32 goals) in the Serie A for Salernitana Calcio 1919, A.S. Lucchese Libertas 1905 and A.S. Roma.

Merlin died in November 2003 at the age of 80.
