= Aldo Ballarin =

Italian footballer (1922–1949)

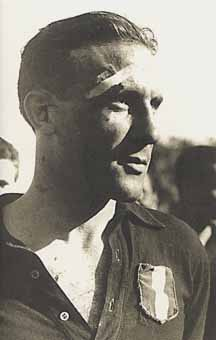

Personal information
- Date of birth: 10 January 1922
- Place of birth: Chioggia, Italy
- Date of death: 4 May 1949 (aged 27)
- Place of death: Superga, Italy
- Height: 1.85 m (6 ft 1 in)
- Position: Defender

Youth career
- 1938–1939: Adriese

Senior career*
Years	Team	Apps	(Gls)
1939–1941	Rovigo	36	(2)
1941–1943	Triestina	57	(1)
1943–1945	Venezia	21	(9)
1945–1949	Torino	148	(4)
Total		262	(16)

International career
1945–1949	Italy	9	(0)
- * Club domestic league appearances and goals

Aldo Ballarin (Italian pronunciation: [ˈaldo ballaˈrin]; 10 January 1922 – 4 May 1949) was an Italian footballer who played as a defender.

== Club career ==
Ballarin played for five seasons (166 games, three goals) in Serie A for U.S. Triestina Calcio and Torino. With Torino, he won four Serie A titles.

== International career ==
He made his debut for the Italy national team on 11 November 1945 in a game against Switzerland.

== Personal life ==
Aldo's younger brothers Dino Ballarin and Sergio Ballarin also played football professionally. To distinguish them, Aldo was referred to as Ballarin I, Dino as Ballarin II and Sergio as Ballarin III.

== Death ==
Ballarin died with his brother Dino and most of the Grande Torino team in the Superga air disaster. The stadium in his hometown, in which A.C. Chioggia Sottomarina plays, was renamed in their honour.

== Honours ==
Torino

- Serie A: 1945–46, 1946–47, 1947–48, 1948–49.
