= Stadio Filadelfia =

Football stadium in Turin, Italy

- Campo Torino; Il Fila
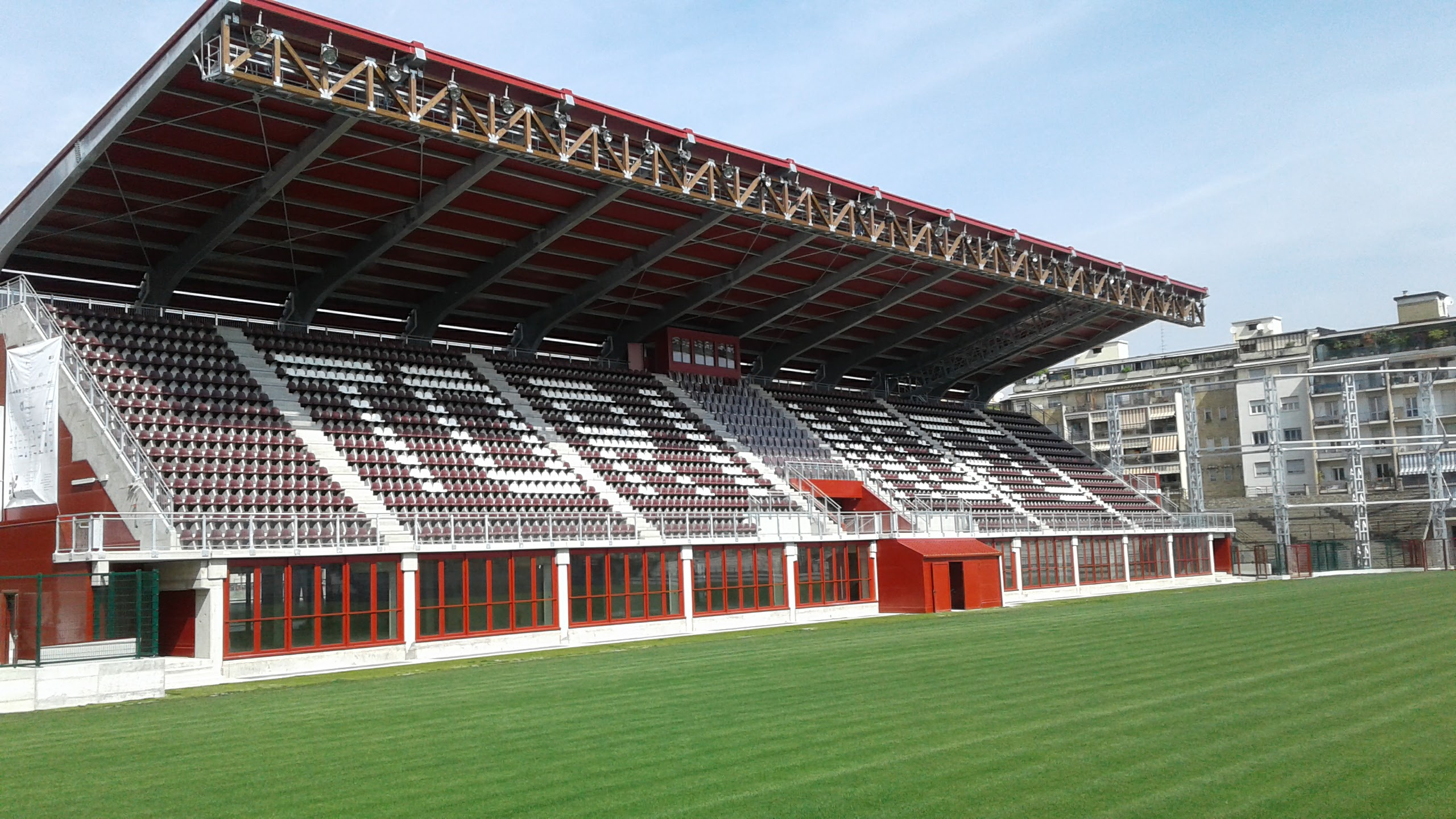
- Interactive map of Stadio Filadelfia
- Full name: Stadio Filadelfia
- Location: Via Filadelfia, 36; Borgo Filadelfia; Turin
- Coordinates: 45°02′17.5″N 7°39′30.6″E
- Owner: Community of Turin
- Capacity: 4,000
- Surface: Grass
- Field size: 110 x 70 m

Construction
- Groundbreaking: 1926
- Opened: 1926
- Renovated: 1946 (post-World War II bombardment) and 2017
- Closed: 1963
- Demolished: 1998 (partially)
- Cost: ₤2,500,000 (1926) ₤8,000,000 (1946)
- Architect: Miro Gamba

Tenant
- Torino (1926–1943, 1945–1958, 1959–1963)

The Stadio Filadelfia, originally known as Campo Torino (or simply, Il Fila) is a small multi-use stadium in Turin, Italy, situated in Borgo Filadelfia in the Lingotto district.

Designed by the former President of Foot-Ball Club Torino, Count Enrico Marone Cinzano, the ground was opened in 1926 and continuously hosted all of Torino's home games until 1958. In 1963 it was abandoned in favour of the Stadio Comunale, becoming Torino's training ground for the first team, then later, the youth team. After the partial degradation of the structure during the 1980s and 1990s, the ground was partially demolished in 1998.

In 2015 the reconstruction of the stadium began, and was completed on 24 May 2017.

== History ==
=== Construction ===
The stadium was designed by Count Enrico Marone Cinzano, the president of Foot-Ball Club Torino. Enrico Marone created the Società Civile Campo Torino, with a grant, and the sole aim to buy the land and build a stadium with an adjacent training ground. On 24 March 24, 1926 the building permit was requested and, following its acceptance, jobs were assigned to the engineer Miro Gamba, professor of the Polytechnic University of Turin; the construction work was commenced by the Commendatore Riccardo Filippa. The land, at that time, on the outskirts of Turin, was chosen for the low cost of the area.

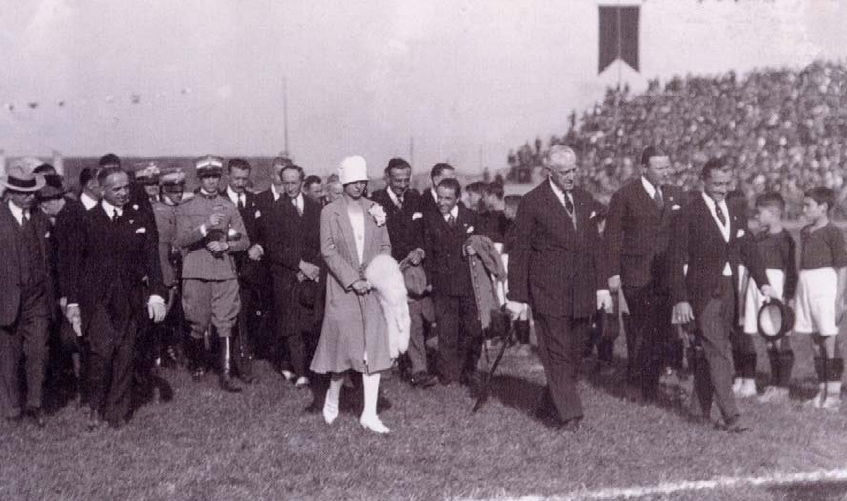
Count Marone Cinzano, Princess Marie Adélaïde and the Duke of Aosta during the inauguration ceremony

The construction occupied five months, and just under two and a half million lire. The inauguration took place on 17 October 1926 and marked by a friendly between Torino and Fortitudo Roma, in the presence of Crown Prince Umberto II, Princess Mary Adelaide and an audience of 15,000 spectators. The field was blessed before the match by the Archbishop of Turin, Giuseppe Gamba and ended with the victory of Torino 4–0.

=== Structure ===
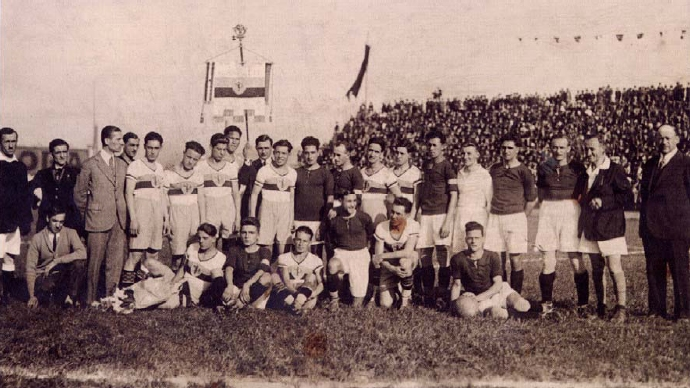
The teams of Torino and Fortitudo Roma that clashed in the opening match

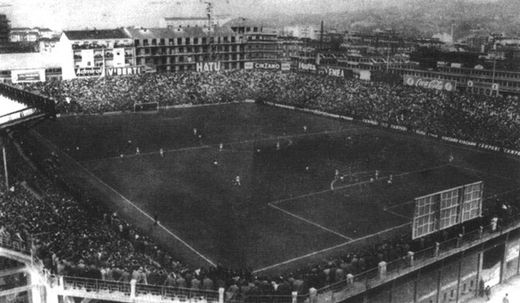
The Stadio Filadelfia

Originally the stadium covered an area of 38,000 m^{2} enclosed by a wall; it consisted of only two stands, with a capacity of 15,000 (1300 in the central grandstand, 9500 on the bleachers, 4000 in the parterre). The parterre was situated under the grandstand, arranged by 13 rows. The Stadio Filadelfia's bleachers were cement, while the stands were wooden and cast iron built Art Nouveau style. The seating in the forum was made of wood, and all numbered. The wall around the structure was 2.5 meters high.

Stadium entrance

The facade was made of red brick, with columns and large windows with white frames. The various windows were connected by a gallery with iron railings. At the front was an old field that was used for training in the 1930s. The main structure of the building was reinforced concrete, while the stands were composed of pillars supporting a network of longitudinal wooden trusses on which panels of asbestos were placed. The parterre was instead formed by masonry. The support of the flag which was located at the entrance was about 6 meters high; its base was covered with bas-reliefs depicting a Greco Deco style. The field measured 110x70 meters and was covered with grass and had a drainage system. Under the stands was the caretaker's apartment, and fourteen rooms that were used by the players and the referee, the infirmary, club officials, and a hall for refreshments. Players could reach the field from the changing rooms through an underpass. The stadium also underwent extension work. In 1928 a box office was added, and in 1932, the grandstand was expanded bringing the total capacity to 30,000 people.

=== Grande Torino ===
The stadium hosted Torino's home matches until 1962–63. It was the site of six of their seven Serie A titles (not counting the one revoked in 1927) and the stage they remained unbeaten for six years, 100 consecutive matches, from 17 January 1943 to the Superga air disaster, including the famous 10–0 victory over Alessandria (still a record in Serie A). It was here that Oreste Bolmida performed (the trumpeter fan then made famous by the movie Ora e per sempre). On 13 July 1943, in the middle of World War II, the Filadelfia was also bombed. Of the damaged parts were the field (used by the Allies to play baseball) and the stands near via Giordano Bruno. Despite the coverage the grandstand remained intact, although the metal beams were removed, probably to supply the arms industry, and replaced with wood. The Filadelfia became unusable for a long time, and the 1943–44 season was played at the Stadio Motovelodromo Umberto I. Torino would later move to the Stadio Mussolini, the future Stadio Comunale. After the war, renovations were carried out by the new club president Ferruccio Novo.

=== Degradation of the structure ===
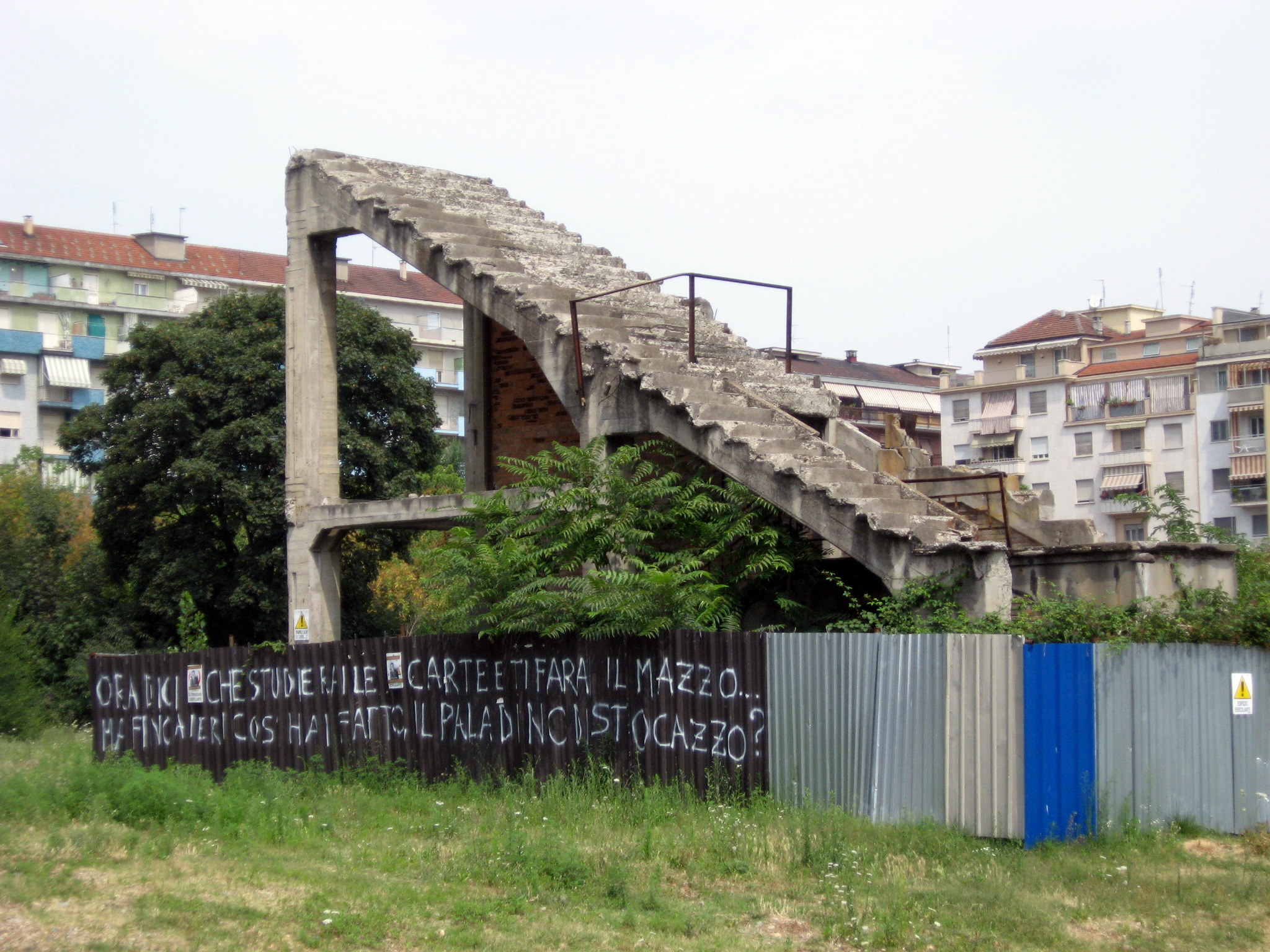
The old grandstands before the reconstruction, reduced to a few fenced stumps

After the Superga disaster, Torino's president Ferruccio Novo guaranteed the stadium to the Italian Football Federation, and even thought of possibly demolishing it. In the post-war period the Filadelfia area became residential, and it was proposed to demolish the stadium to build new buildings. In 1959 the stadium became "public space", and the project failed. In the 1958–59 season, Torino, under the name Talmone Torino for sponsorship reasons, moved to the Stadio Comunale: the season ended with the club's first relegation to Serie B. The following year, the club returned to the Filadelfia out of superstition and the ground once again became Torino's home for several years. On 19 May 1963, the last official match was played at the stadium, a league fixture against Napoli, finishing 1–1, with goals from Enzo Bearzot and Gianni Corelli. The move to the "Comunale," a stadium capable of holding 65,000 people standing, was completed in 1963–64.

In 1970 the first attempt was made to recover the Filadelfia when Torino's president was Orfeo Pianelli; the Società Civile Campo Torino began the renovation project. It was proposed that the first team would continue to train at the ground and allow for the construction of a gymnasium. However, in 1973 the project was cancelled because the ground was still classified as "public space". Pianelli's idea involved the demolition of the structure, the construction of playing fields and accommodations for the youth team. The original plan failed because Pianelli received death threats. On 18 October, a building permit was issued, but only for minor renovations, provided for an annual fee. Torino continued to train here up until 1989, when they moved to a modern structure in Orbassano, leaving the training ground to the youth team. The maintenance was abandoned, however, and in a few years the stands deteriorated. In the 1980s the degradation had an exponential growth, mainly because of the concrete used in construction, leading to a partial collapse of the structures.

=== Reconstruction ===
Under club chairman Urbano Cairo the ceremony of laying the first stone of the new Filadelfia stadium took place on 17 October 2015. The project, initiated by the Stadio Filadelfia Foundation, was established in 2011 with the aim of completely redeveloping the site. The new Filadelfia was to become the new headquarters of the club, hold 4,000 spectators, two first team training pitches, youth team facilities, and the club museum. It was inaugurated on 24 May 2017.
