= Armando Cavazzuti =

Italian footballer (1929-2014)

Personal information
- Date of birth: January 23, 1929 (age 97)
- Place of birth: Modena, Italy
- Position: Midfielder

Senior career*
Years	Team	Apps	(Gls)
1948–1951	Modena	24	(4)
1951–1952	Pisa	37	(10)
1952–1954	Palermo	45	(9)
1954–1956	Roma	29	(4)
1956–1957	Cagliari	28	(4)
1957–1958	Roma	2	(0)
1958–1959	Udinese	6	(0)
1959–1960	Venezia	22	(1)
1960–1961	Biellese	9	(2)
1961–1962	Reggina	8	(2)
- * Club domestic league appearances and goals

Armando Cavazzuti (born January 23, 1929 - October 31, 2014) was an Italian professional football player and manager, who played as a midfielder.

== Career ==
Cavazzuti played for 7 seasons (97 games, 16 goals) in the Italian Serie A for Modena F.C., U.S. Città di Palermo, A.S. Roma and Udinese Calcio; he also played for Pisa, Cagliari, Venezia, Biellese, and Reggina throughout his career. During his spell with his hometown club Modena, he became the last player in Italy to score a goal against the Grande Torino side which dominated Italian football in the mid to late 1940s, scoring in a 3–1 defeat to Torino on 17 April 1949.

== Death ==
Cavazzuti died on 31 October 2014 at the age of 85, in his hometown Modena.
