= EF Bordeaux-Guyenne =

French football club

Équipe fédérale Bordeaux-Guyenne were a French football team in existence between 1943 and 1944. They participated in the 1943–44 Coupe de France.
