= Virgilio Maroso =

Italian footballer (1925–1949)

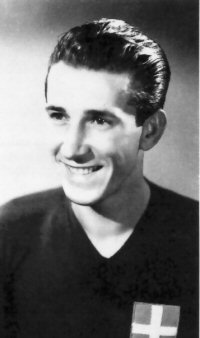

Personal information
- Date of birth: 26 June 1925
- Place of birth: Marostica, Italy
- Date of death: 4 May 1949 (aged 23)
- Place of death: Superga, Italy
- Position: Defender

Senior career*
Years	Team	Apps	(Gls)
1944	→ Alessandria (loan)	12	(0)
1944–1949	Torino	103	(1)
Total		115	(1)

International career
1945–1949	Italy	7	(1)
- * Club domestic league appearances and goals

Virgilio Maroso (Italian pronunciation: [virˈdʒiːljo maˈroːzo; -oːso]; 26 June 1925 – 4 May 1949) was an Italian football player, who played as a defender for Torino FC and died in the Superga air disaster together with nearly the whole Grande Torino team.

== Biography ==
Maroso was born in Marostica, in the province of Vicenza. He was the brother of Pietro Maroso (1934–2012), also a Serie A player and honorary president of A.S. Varese.

== Club career ==
Maroso played as a defender. After a period on loan at Alessandria (1944), he made his club debut with Torino on 14 October 1945, in a 2–1 defeat to rivals Juventus in the Turin Derby. In total, he played 103 times for Torino in league matches, scoring once, and won four consecutive Serie A (scudetti) titles between 1945 and 1949.

== International career ==
At international level, he was capped seven times for the Italy national team between 1945 and 1949, scoring one goal. His debut came on 11 November 1945, in a 4–4 draw against Switzerland.

== Style of play ==
Maroso was a precocious full-back, who is considered to be one of the best Italian players ever in his position. Maroso was one of the first-ever attacking full-backs in football, who also played winger due to his ability to get up the flank. He was also strong defensively, and was capable of playing with either foot. He also was appreciated for fair play on the pitch, and he rarely gave away fouls; despite his skill, however, he was also injury-prone.

== Death and legacy ==
Maroso died with most of the Grande Torino team in the Superga air disaster near Turin, on 4 May 1949.

The football stadium in his hometown of Marostica is dedicated to him.

== Honours ==
Torino

- Serie A: 1945–46, 1946–47, 1947–48, 1948–49

Individual

- Torino FC Hall of Fame: 2014
