= Dino Ballarin =

Italian footballer (1925–1949)

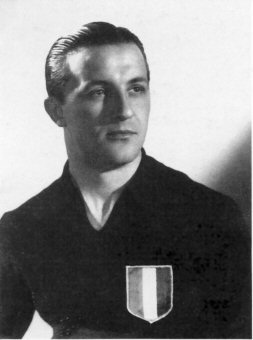

Personal information
- Date of birth: 23 September 1925
- Place of birth: Chioggia, Italy
- Date of death: 4 May 1949 (aged 23)
- Place of death: Superga, Italy
- Position: Goalkeeper

Senior career*
Years	Team	Apps	(Gls)
1942–1944	Rovigo	1	(0)
1945–1947	Clodia		(0)
1947–1949	Torino	0	(0)
- * Club domestic league appearances and goals

Dino Ballarin (23 September 1925 – 4 May 1949) was an Italian footballer who played as a goalkeeper.

== Club career ==
Ballarin arrived at Torino in 1947, the team in which his brother, Aldo Ballarin, played as a defender. Dino arrived from the amateurs and never played in any competitive games for Torino. However, he distinguished himself in the team for his dedication, which saw him the first to arrive at practice and the last to leave. As a reward, his brother Aldo convinced the club to take him to Lisbon for a friendly with Benfica, which would be the final game of the Grande Torino.

The decision was a great disappointment to the second goalkeeper, Renato Gandolfi, who was notified on short notice. Gandolfi did not know that this event would later save his life, as both Ballarin brothers died together in the Superga air disaster.

In memory of their deaths, the town of Chioggia renamed its municipal stadium in honour of the two footballers. In 1949, the town of San Benedetto del Tronto renamed its pitch, then used by Sambenedettese, after the two brothers.

Dino Ballarin was buried in the cemetery of Chioggia, near his brother Aldo.

== Trivia ==
Dino Ballarin was played by Matteo Taranto in the TV miniseries Il Grande Torino.

== Bibliography ==
- Nicoletta Perini e Davide Bovolenta, "Aldo e Dino Ballarin, uniti per sempre", Il Leggio, 2005
