= Superga air disaster =

1949 aviation accident

Coordinates: 45°04′52.1″N 7°46′08.3″E

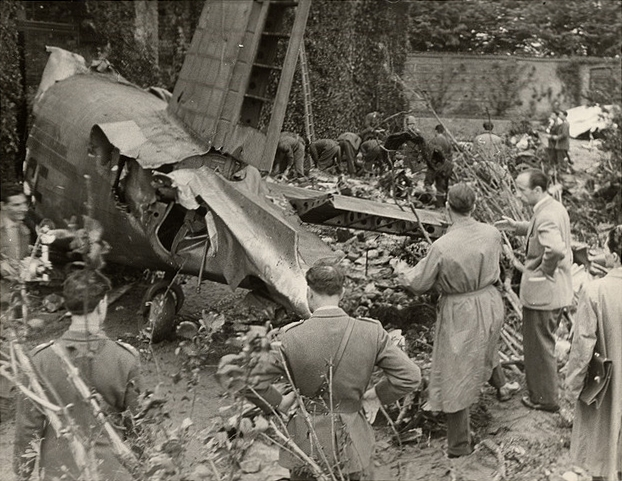
- Wreckage of the Avio Linee Italiane Fiat G.212 after the crash

Accident
- Date: 4 May 1949
- Summary: Controlled flight into terrain due to low visibility
- Site: Superga Hill, Turin, Italy

Aircraft
- Aircraft type: Fiat G.212 CP
- Operator: Avio Linee Italiane
- Registration: I-ELCE
- Flight origin: Lisbon, Portugal
- Destination: Turin, Italy
- Passengers: 27
- Crew: 4
- Fatalities: 31
- Survivors: 0

The Superga air disaster (Italian: Tragedia di Superga, "Tragedy of Superga") occurred on 4 May 1949, when a Fiat G.212 airliner of Avio Linee Italiane, carrying the entire Torino football team (popularly known as the Grande Torino), crashed into the retaining wall at the back of the Basilica of Superga, which stands on a hilltop near Turin, Italy. All thirty-one people on board were killed.

== Background ==
The Avio Linee Italiane Fiat G.212CP was carrying the team home from Lisbon, where they had played a friendly match with S.L. Benfica in honour of the Portuguese captain, Francisco Ferreira. In the incident, the whole active Torino team (almost all of whom were also members of the Italy national football team) lost their lives. Club officials including the manager, Ernő Egri Erbstein, a Hungarian refugee, and the head coach, Englishman Leslie Lievesley, also perished in the accident, as well as the crew of the aircraft and three well-known Italian sports journalists: Renato Casalbore (founder of Tuttosport); Renato Tosatti (the Gazzetta del Popolo, father of Giorgio Tosatti), and Luigi Cavallero (La Stampa). The task of identifying the bodies was entrusted to the former manager of the Italy national team, Vittorio Pozzo, who had called up most of Torino's players to the Azzurri.

The full-back Sauro Tomà did not take part in the trip due to an injured meniscus, nor did the reserve goalkeeper, Renato Gandolfi (the third goalkeeper, Dino Ballarin, took his place). Radio commentator Nicolò Carosio, Luigi Giuliano (captain of the Torino youth team), and former manager of the Italy national team Vittorio Pozzo, were excluded for various reasons. Torino's president, Ferruccio Novo, also did not go on the trip because he was ill with influenza.

== Crash ==
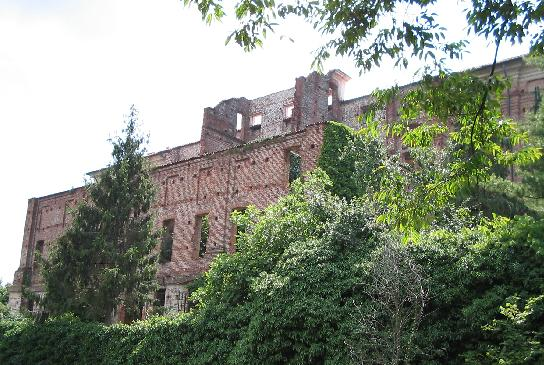
The back wall of the Basilica of Superga. Popular belief is that it was damaged by the plane; in reality, a project to expand the basilica was begun but never completed.

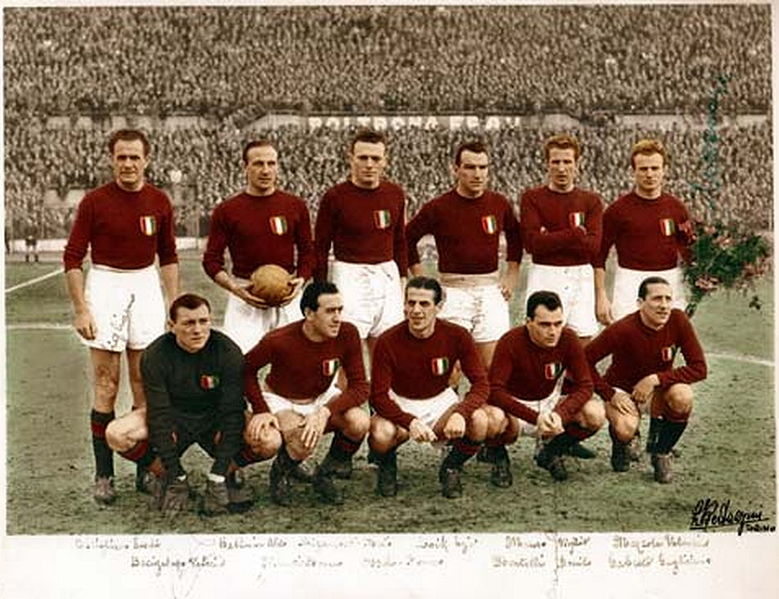
The Grande Torino

The three-engined Fiat G.212, with aircraft registration I-ELCE, of Avio Linee Italiane, took off from Lisbon at 09:40 a.m. on Wednesday, 4 May 1949. The commander of the aircraft was Lieutenant Colonel Meroni. The flight landed at the airport in Barcelona at 13:00. While the aircraft was refuelled during the stopover, Torino met for lunch with Milan, who were on their way to Madrid.

At 14:50, I-ELCE set off for the Turin-Aeritalia Airport. The flight's route was to take it over Cap de Creus, Toulon, Nice, Albenga, and Savona. Above Savona, the plane turned north, in the direction of the capital of Piedmont, where it was expected to arrive in 30 minutes. The weather in Turin was poor; at 16:55, the airport of Turin Aeritalia communicated the weather situation to the pilot: clouds almost touching the ground, showers, strong southwest wind gusts, and very poor horizontal visibility (40 metres (130 ft)).

At this point, the tower asked for the pilot's position. After a few minutes of silence (at 16:59) came the reply: "Quota 2,000 metres (6,600 ft). QDM on Pino, then we will cut at Superga". At Pino Torinese, which is located between Chieri and Baldissero Torinese, southeast of Turin, there was a VHF direction finder, to provide a QDM (magnetic course to be taken on a head-on approach as a radio aid) on request.

On approach, the plane lined up with the runway at Aeritalia about 9 miles (14 km) away to the west, at 305 metres (1,001 ft) above sea level, with Pino at 290° off its nose. Just north of Pino Torinese was the Basilica of Superga, situated on a hill at 669 metres (2,195 ft) above sea level. One theory for the deviation is that due to the strong left crosswinds, the plane could have suffered a drift to starboard, which shifted from the axis of descent and lined up with the hill of Superga. Recent investigations also suggested the possibility that the altimeter had malfunctioned and locked at 2,000 metres (6,600 ft), which led the pilots to believe that they were at a higher altitude.

At 17:03, the plane made a turn to the left, returned to level flight, and had aligned to prepare for landing when it crashed into the back of the embankment of the Basilica of Superga. The pilot, who likely believed that the Superga hill was off to his right, would have seen it suddenly emerge directly in front of him (speed 180 kilometres per hour (110 mph), visibility 40 metres (130 ft)) and been unable to react. The wreckage did not give any indication of an attempt to go around. The only part of the aircraft which remained partially intact was the empennage.

At 17:05, Aeritalia Tower called I-ELCE, but received no response. All of the 31 people on board were killed.

== Victims ==
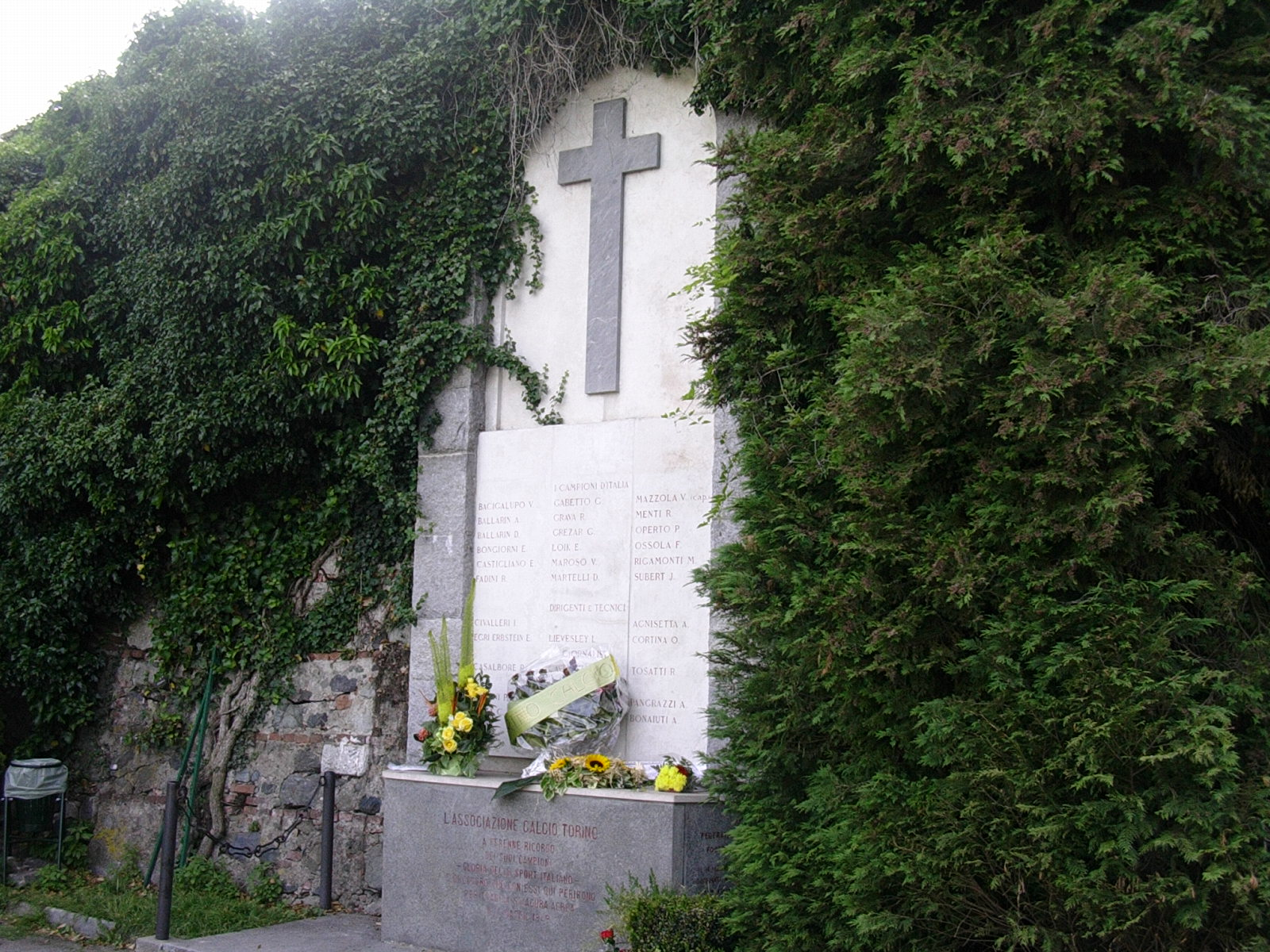
The memorial to the victims of the disaster at the Basilica of Superga

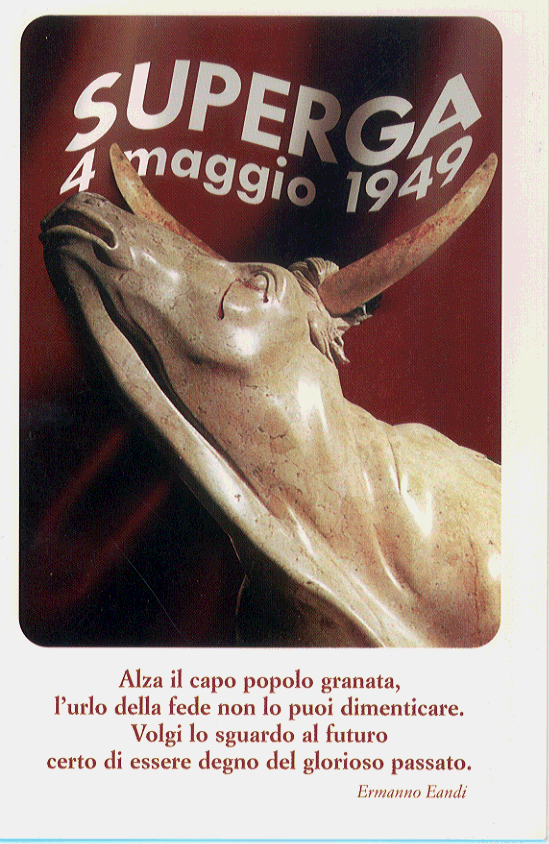
Opera of E. Eandi created for the 50th anniversary of the tragedy. The cover reads: "Raise your heads, scarlet people,/The faithful shout cannot be forgotten./Turn your gaze unto the future/And be sure of being worthy of the glorious past."

=== Players ===
- Valerio Bacigalupo
- Aldo Ballarin
- Dino Ballarin
- Émile Bongiorni
- Eusebio Castigliano
- Rubens Fadini
- Guglielmo Gabetto
- Ruggero Grava
- Giuseppe Grezar
- Ezio Loik
- Virgilio Maroso
- Danilo Martelli
- Valentino Mazzola
- Romeo Menti
- Piero Operto
- Franco Ossola
- Mario Rigamonti
- Július Schubert

=== Coaching staff ===
- Ottavio Corina, massage therapist
- Ernő Egri Erbstein, manager
- Leslie Lievesley, coach

=== Club officials ===
- Arnaldo Agnisetta, general manager
- Andrea Bonaiuti, travel organizer
- Ippolito Civalleri, travel escort

=== Journalists ===
- Renato Casalbore
- Luigi Cavallero
- Renato Tosatti

=== Flight crew ===
- Cesare Biancardi, co-pilot
- Celestino D'Inca, engineer
- Pierluigi Meroni, pilot
- Antonio Pangrazi, radio operator

== Aftermath ==
At the request of rival teams, Torino were proclaimed winners of the 1948–49 Serie A season on 6 May 1949, and the opponents, as well as Torino, fielded their youth teams in the four remaining games. On the day of the funeral, half a million people took to the streets of Turin to give a final farewell to the players. The following season, the other top Italian teams were asked to donate a player to Torino. The shock of the crash was such that the following year, the Italy national team chose to travel to the 1950 FIFA World Cup in Brazil by ship.

The crash is commemorated annually. Remains of the aircraft, including a propeller, a tyre, scattered pieces of the fuselage, and the personal bags of Mazzola, Maroso, and Erbstein, are preserved in a museum in Grugliasco near Turin. The Museo del Grande Torino e della Leggenda Granata, located in the prestigious Villa Claretta Assandri of Grugliasco, was opened on 4 May 2008, the anniversary of the tragedy. Eight of the 18 players (as well as two coaches and the journalist Renato Casalbore) are buried at the Cimitero Monumentale of Turin.

== See also ==
- List of accidents involving sports teams

== Bibliography ==
- Roberto Thoeni, L'ultimo urlo per il grande Torino, Abaco Editori
- Dino Buzzati, in La nera di Dino Buzzati, Oscar Mondadori
- Vincenzo Baggioli (a cura), Il Torino. Oltre la vita!, Milano, I.P.L.
