= Valentino Mazzola =

Italian footballer (1919–1949)

- Mazzola with Torino, c. 1942–49

Personal information
- Date of birth: 26 January 1919
- Place of birth: Cassano d'Adda, Lombardy, Kingdom of Italy
- Date of death: 4 May 1949 (aged 30)
- Place of death: Superga, Piedmont, Italy
- Height: 1.70 m (5 ft 7 in)
- Positions: Forward; attacking midfielder

Youth career
- 1934–193?: Tresoldi
- 193?: Fara d'Adda
- 193?–1936: Tresoldi

Senior career*
Years	Team	Apps	(Gls)
1936–1938	Tresoldi		
1938–1939	Alfa Romeo	33	(33)
1939–1940	Venezia Reserves		
1939–1942	Venezia	61	(12)
1942–1949	Torino	195	(118)

International career
1942–1949	Italy	12	(4)
- * Club domestic league appearances and goals

Valentino Mazzola (Italian pronunciation: [valenˈtiːno matˈtsɔːla]; 26 January 1919 – 4 May 1949) was an Italian footballer who played as an attacking midfielder or forward.

Considered one of the great number 10s in the history of football and, according to some, the best Italian footballer of all time, Mazzola was the captain and symbol of the "Grande Torino", the team recognised as one of the strongest in the world during the second half of the 1940s, with whom Mazzola won five Serie A championships. He was also captain of the Italy national team for two years.

He became known during his spell at Venezia, where he played as a midfielder, a playing position he held throughout his career that allowed him to expand his fame beyond Italy. In his later seasons, he was considered one of the best players in Europe in his role. He died at the age of 30 in the Superga air disaster.

== Early life ==
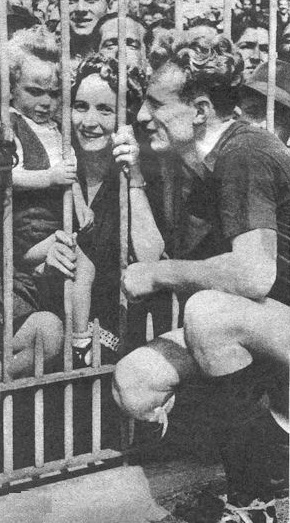
Valentino Mazzola and his first wife Emilia Ranaldi, with his first son Sandro, at the Arena Civica

He was born in Cassano d'Adda, Ricetto, a neighbourhood of abandoned homes, to a very modest family. His father, Alessandro, was a labourer for Azienda Torinese Mobilità and died in August 1940, hit by a truck. His mother's name was Leonina Ratti, and his four brothers were Piero, Silvio, Carlo and Stefano. He had an unsettled childhood; in 1929, his father was fired from his job because of the Great Depression. To help his family, Valentino sought work the following year, just as he finished the first year of grade school. He found employment as a baker's boy, then, at age 14, the linen mill at Cassano d'Adda.

In the summer of 1929, at age 10, he threw himself into the river Adda to save the life of a boy four years his junior from drowning: his name was Andrea Bonomi, the future football player and captain of Milan. A Juventus fan at a young age, he was nicknamed "Tulen" for his habit of kicking old tin cans, which Valentino would kick on his journey between home and the linen mill. He played in his local neighbourhood team, the "Tresoldi" and was noticed by a football fan who worked as a test driver for the Alfa Romeo factory in Arese, who offered Valentino a place in the Alfa Romeo team and a job as a mechanic.

In 1939, he was called up to join military service in the Royal Navy, in the port of Venice; he spent a few months on the ship, aboard the destroyer Confienza, and was later moved to the Compagnia del Porto. In Venice, he obtained his elementary school diploma, attending night school.

Valentino was a private person of few words. On 15 March 1942, he married Emilia Rinaldi, with whom he had two sons, both players: Sandro - who played for Inter Milan and the Italy national team – and Ferruccio (who was named in honour of the president of Torino, Ferruccio Novo), born respectively in 1942 and 1945. In Turin, he lived in a small apartment in Via Torricelli 66. He worked in Lingotto and was reported as a FIAT worker essential to wartime production, to avoid participating directly in the Second World War. Although the Torino players' salaries were very good, they were not considered exaggerated compared to a normal payroll. The players were not considered professionals and officially held other jobs; in the aftermath of the war, Mazzola owned a sports shop in Turin, where he sold footballs that he manufactured personally.

Mazzola, who considered himself a solitary person, led a secluded life, prioritising football above all. His entertainment consisted of a few games of bowls near his house. He used to write down everything, both in regard to his personal and professional life. He was very strict and meticulous and demanded the same treatment from others; this was the main reason for his separation from his first wife, who was no longer willing to live with his firm discipline. He separated from his wife in the autumn of 1946 and remarried on 20 April 1949 to 19-year-old Giuseppina Cutrone. On 4 May 1949, just days after his second marriage, he died in the Superga air disaster, unfortunately, as he had thought he would die because of war or misfortune.

== Club career ==
=== Early career ===
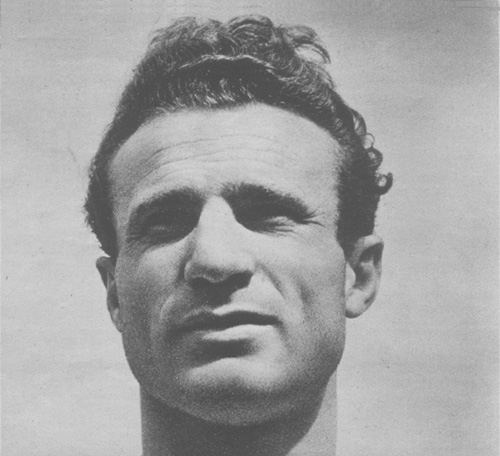
A head shot of Mazzola in the 1940s

Although he started working at a young age, Mazzola continued to cultivate his passion for football; he was the leader of Tresoldi, the team of Cassano d'Adda, who observed him playing in the fields and introduced him to their youth team in 1934. He briefly moved to Fara d'Adda and then returned to Tresoldi. He played as a centre midfielder and right-sided midfielder, even though he was already a multi-purpose player. He participated in his first season with Tresoldi in 1935–36, and the following year he played for the first team, earning 10 lire per game.

In 1938, the same period when Alfa Romeo made him a work proposal that included the possibility of playing in Serie C, he received an offer from Milan, with the prospect of playing in Serie A. He was very indecisive and opted for Alfa Romeo as the car manufacturer also guaranteed him a job.

At Alfa Romeo, he played one season as a winger; but according to another source, he instead played as a right midfielder. He scored 33 goals in 33 matches, and he left the team in 1939 to join the military service in Venice.

=== Venezia ===
In 1939, while he was performing his military service in the Navy, he took part in several matches in the team of the Navy, played on the field of basins, putting on a good display, despite weighing 90 kg. He was noted by some observers of Venezia, who, after various stresses, succeeded in getting him to try out; according to another source, a naval officer who was a fan of Venezia admired the skill of Valentino and offered him to the Lagunari. At the trial, he showed up and played barefoot, having left his boots intentionally at home so as not to ruin them. He convinced everyone, especially the manager Giuseppe Girani, to purchase him. After a few months in the reserve team, which participated in its own championship, he was hired on 1 January 1940 for 50,000 lire. He made his debut in Serie A on 31 March 1940, in a 1–0 defeat away to Lazio, entering as a substitute for the centre forward Francesco Pernigo, and kept his place in the starting lineup on his own merits. He played in all five of the remaining league games, often in the middle of the attack, creating a goal on the penultimate day against Bari, guaranteeing Venezia's safety from relegation. In a Coppa Italia round of 16 defeat against Modena that ended 3–1, he would also score his team's only goal.

It was during this time at Venezia that Mazzola first met Ezio Loik, who had moved to the club from Milan. They debuted together in the 1942 game Italy played against Croatia and won 4–0. Both were very different, although they came from very humble backgrounds: Fiume-born Loik was quiet and somewhat defensive, while Lombard Mazzola was much more impulsive and friendly. Loik did not like Valentino at first, taking his reserve for arrogance, but both soon found a way of understanding each other. The partnership of both attacking midfielders (mezzala in Italian) was based on Loik's stubborn generosity and Mazzola's rare talent. Soon, they became Italy's most coveted up-and-coming young players.

Mazzola's career with Venezia started modestly, with a tenth-place finish in 1940 and a twelfth-place finish the next season. In 1941, however, the team won the Coppa Italia final against Roma and finished third in the league in 1942.

=== Torino ===
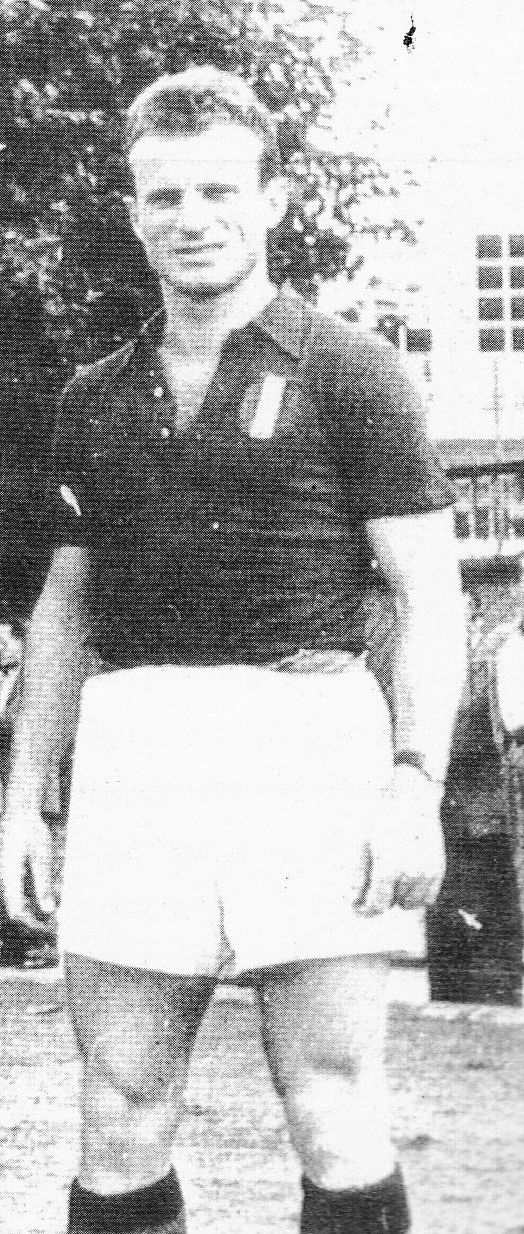
Mazzola poses with a Torino's scudettata shirt in the post–World War II era

In early July 1942, he transferred to Torino for one million and 250 thousand lira, a figure that was criticised by the press, and allowed Venezia to restore all its debts. Juventus had a verbal agreement with Venezia to sign Mazzola. However, Torino eventually offered a record transfer fee plus two players (Raúl Mezzadra and Walter Petron) and won the player's signature. In the same deal, Torino also signed Ezio Loik.

He officially debuted for Torino on 20 September 1942, in the Coppa Italia against Anconitana Bianchi. The match ended 7–0 for Torino, with two goals by Mazzola. On 4 October, he made his league debut for Torino. Both Mazzola and Loik played poorly because of their imprecision and their lack of understanding, and were considered responsible for the 1–0 defeat Torino suffered in Milan against Ambrosiana-Inter. Mazzola initially objected to the position he was playing in for over two months, despite the team beginning to put together a series of victories. He scored his first league goal for Torino on 18 October in a 5–2 win over Juventus.

In April 1943, he scored three goals in the last four matches of the season, with Torino and Livorno head-to-head in first place. In the final round, Torino faced Bari, with Mazzola scoring the decisive goal four minutes from the end of the match, and winning the scudetto for Torino. In the Coppa Italia, Torino reached the final, with Mazzola scoring in a 4–0 win over his former club, Venezia.

In the middle of the Second World War, without prospects of a new season, Torino, whose name changed to Torino FIAT, only played friendly and small unofficial competitions. Mazzola, unlike many of his fellow players, who had returned to play with their home teams, stayed in Turin and, together with his other teammates, began to train and participate in some games. In the unofficial 1944 Campionato Alta Italia, Torino FIAT finished second to La Spezia.

After the championship ended in July 1944, Mazzola and his teammates played several matches for charity. The league resumed in 1945 and was characterised by the Campionato Alta Italia. Mazzola contributed 16 goals to Torino's scudetto-winning formation, with five braces; the first in the third round when he scored twice against Sampierdarenese in Genoa. In this season, Mazzola would also begin rolling his sleeves up to mark the quarto d'ora granata ("the maroon quarter-hour") when the team needed the extra push.

In the 1946–47 season, Mazzola was promoted to captain and finished the season as the league's top scorer with 29 goals. On 20 April 1946, he scored the fastest hat-trick in the history of Italian football, with three goals in three minutes against Vicenza. Mazzola and Loik would constitute the two points of greatest strength of the formation, with Torino winning their fourth overall Scudetto at the end of the season.

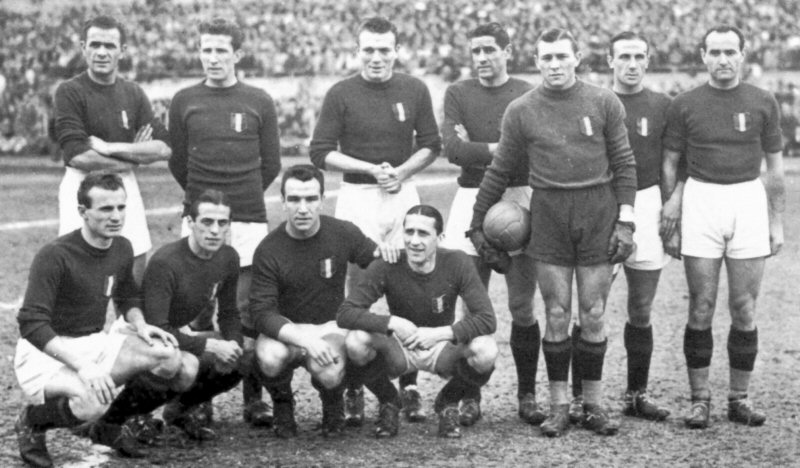
Mazzola (crouching, first on the left) in the 1945–46 season

Mazzola would continue his form in the 1947–48 season, and after the first seven rounds, he was the top scorer with eight goals. On 5 October 1947, at the Stadio Nazionale in Rome, Torino closed the first half with a score of 1–0 for the Giallorossi; returning from the locker room, Torino scored seven goals in 25 minutes, three of which were scored by Mazzola, who was forced to leave the field prematurely, amid the applause of the entire stadium due to a thigh strain. His physical problems continued in the months of November and December, yet Mazzola continued to play, offering repeated discontinuous performances. On 23 May 1948, the match against Triestina in Trieste finished goalless; Mazzola refused to pass to his teammates, who showed impatience for his actions. Various interpretations of this event exist: besides the simple justification that Mazzola wanted to rest, as he was tired and struggling with injuries, there were also rumours that he intended to end his relationship with Torino and move to Internazionale. Amidst this, Torino would go on to win their fourth consecutive title with five rounds to spare, with Mazzola scoring the decisive goal in a 4–3 win over Lazio. Mazzola finished the season with 25 goals as the second top scorer behind Giampiero Boniperti.

At the end of the season, Torino were invited to play four friendly matches in Brazil by the Brazilian Football Confederation; Mazzola, before leaving, on 29 June, announced in a radio interview his farewell to Torino, amid the dismay of the fans. A few days before the start of the new season, scheduled for 19 September 1948, six Torino players, including Mazzola, did not return due to a contract dispute. Mazzola, included in the transfer list, would miss the first round of the season against Pro Patria. However, an agreement with the club was reached on 23 September, with Mazzola returning in a 3–2 loss to Atalanta, in which he scored. Mazzola would go on to score the winning goal in the derby and offered a very positive performance seven days later in a 3–1 win at Padova, scoring a goal and leading the team alone to victory. In early 1949, he had to live with several muscular injuries, which caused him to considerably reduce training and gain weight. Despite not being able to fully recover, he scored four consecutive goals between January and February. On 24 April, in the 33rd round, against Bari (1–1), he scored the final goal of his career. On 30 April, Torino drew 0–0 at the San Siro against Inter; Mazzola, due to a strong sore throat with high fever and a form of angina, did not take part in the match.

On 1 May, the day after the match against the Nerazzurri, Torino flew to Lisbon to dispute a friendly against Benfica on 3 May. The match, organised by Mazzola as a farewell to the captain of the Portugal national team, Francisco Ferreira, ended 4–3 for the Portuguese. The two had previously met on 27 February, when Italy had beaten Portugal 4–1 in Genoa. Ferreira and Mazzola had met in a restaurant in the afternoon and discussed the match that Benfica would dedicate to the Portuguese, with proceeds donated to charity.

== Death ==
Despite suffering from illness, Mazzola was determined to attend the match he had organised for Torino in Lisbon in 1949. On 4 May, on the return journey from the game, the aircraft carrying Mazzola and the rest of the team crashed, killing everyone on board.

Vittorio Pozzo contributed to the recognition of the bodies, which took place late in the night. The funeral, attended by over half a million people, was held on 6 May; the bodies were brought to Palazzo Madama, from where the procession departed, continuing to the Duomo. On the same day, the FIGC proclaimed Torino champions of the 1948–49 season, four rounds before the end, approving the proposal of Inter, Milan and Juventus.

== International career ==
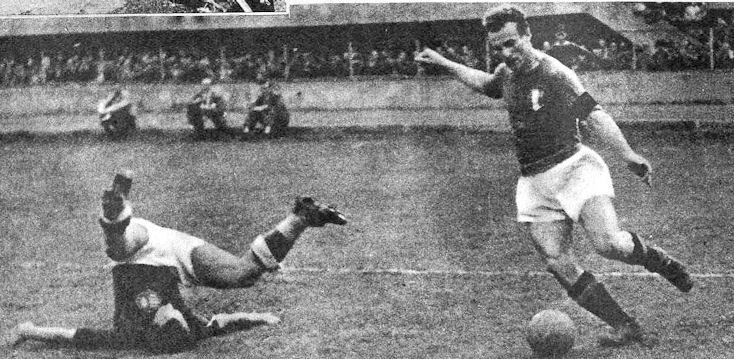
Turin, 11 May 1947, Italy–Hungary (3–2). Mazzola dribbles past an opponent and prepares to shoot.

Mazzola made his debut for the national side on 5 April 1942, in a 4–0 friendly home win over Croatia. He scored his first international goal on 19 April, in a 4–0 friendly home win over Spain. Overall, Mazzola played 12 matches with the Italy national team between 1942 and 1949 and scored 4 goals, also serving as the side's captain between 1947 and 1949.

== Style of play ==
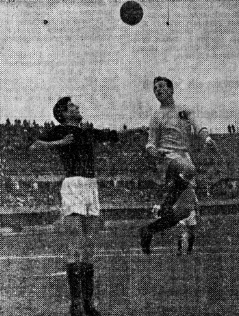
Due to his elevation Mazzola could outleap tall defenders

Mazzola is widely regarded as one of the best football players of his era. He was a versatile and physically apt player, capable of playing in multiple positions on the pitch. He was also noted for his charismatic presence and leadership on the field; contemporaries and later accounts describe his habit of raising his shirt sleeves during matches as a signal to his teammates and supporters that the team wasn't performing well.

Mazzola was a quick, strong and energetic midfielder, with excellent technical qualities and dribbling skills, as well as notable stamina, positional sense, vision, creativity, and accurate shooting and passing ability with both feet. Because of his tactical intelligence and many attributes, he was capable of both scoring and creating goals for his team. He was also an excellent playmaker and highly regarded for his ability to orchestrate his team's attacking moves. Although he was usually deployed as an attacking midfielder, he was also capable of playing in more offensive roles, as a main forward, as a winger on either flank or as an inside or supporting striker. Despite his small stature, he excelled in the air due to his power, timing, heading accuracy, and elevation, which allowed him to beat larger players to the ball.

Although he was mainly renowned for his offensive and creative capabilities, Mazzola was also highly competent defensively, often pressing and tackling opponents in order to win back possession, and was even capable of being deployed as a central midfielder or as a defender.

In the Milan area, players who insist on dribbling rather than passing are called "Veneziani" (Venetians). This is a reference to when Mazzola played for Venezia, as well as his penchant for undertaking individual dribbling runs. José Altafini, a forward who won the 1958 World Cup with Brazil and also played for Italy, is called "Mazzola" in his home country due to his resemblance to Valentino.

== Honours ==
Torino

- Serie A: 1942–43, 1945–46, 1946–47, 1947–48, 1948–49
- Coppa Italia: 1942–43

Venezia

- Coppa Italia: 1940–41

Individual

- Seria A top scorer: 1946–47
- Coppa Italia top scorer: 1942–43
- Italian Football Hall of Fame (Posthumously): 2012
- Walk of Fame of Italian sport: 2015
- Torino FC Hall of Fame: 2015
- Guerin Sportivo Player of the Century (posthumous honour, 1999): 7th
