= Ferruccio Novo =

Italian footballer, coach, and sports manager

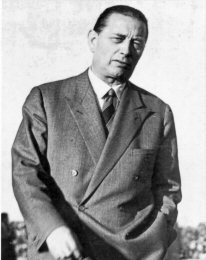

Personal information
- Date of birth: 22 March 1897
- Place of birth: Turin, Italy
- Date of death: 8 April 1974 (aged 77)
- Place of death: Laigueglia, Italy
- Position: Defender

Senior career*
Years	Team	Apps	(Gls)
- Torino

Managerial career
- 1939–1953: Torino (President)
- 1949–1950: Italy
- * Club domestic league appearances and goals

Ferruccio Novo (22 March 1897 – 8 April 1974) was an Italian association football player, coach, and sports manager, who played as a defender. He was the president of the Grande Torino.

== Playing career ==
Novo spent his entire career playing for Italian club Torino F.C.

== Post-playing career ==
Novo became Torino's president in 1939. In 1949 he survived the Superga air disaster due to suffering from influenza. Moreover, as the Technical Commission Chairman of the Italy national football team, he led them to the 1950 FIFA World Cup. In 2014, he was inducted posthumously into the Italian Football Hall of Fame.
