= Superga =

Hill in north-west Italy

Coordinates: 45°04′50″N 7°46′02″E

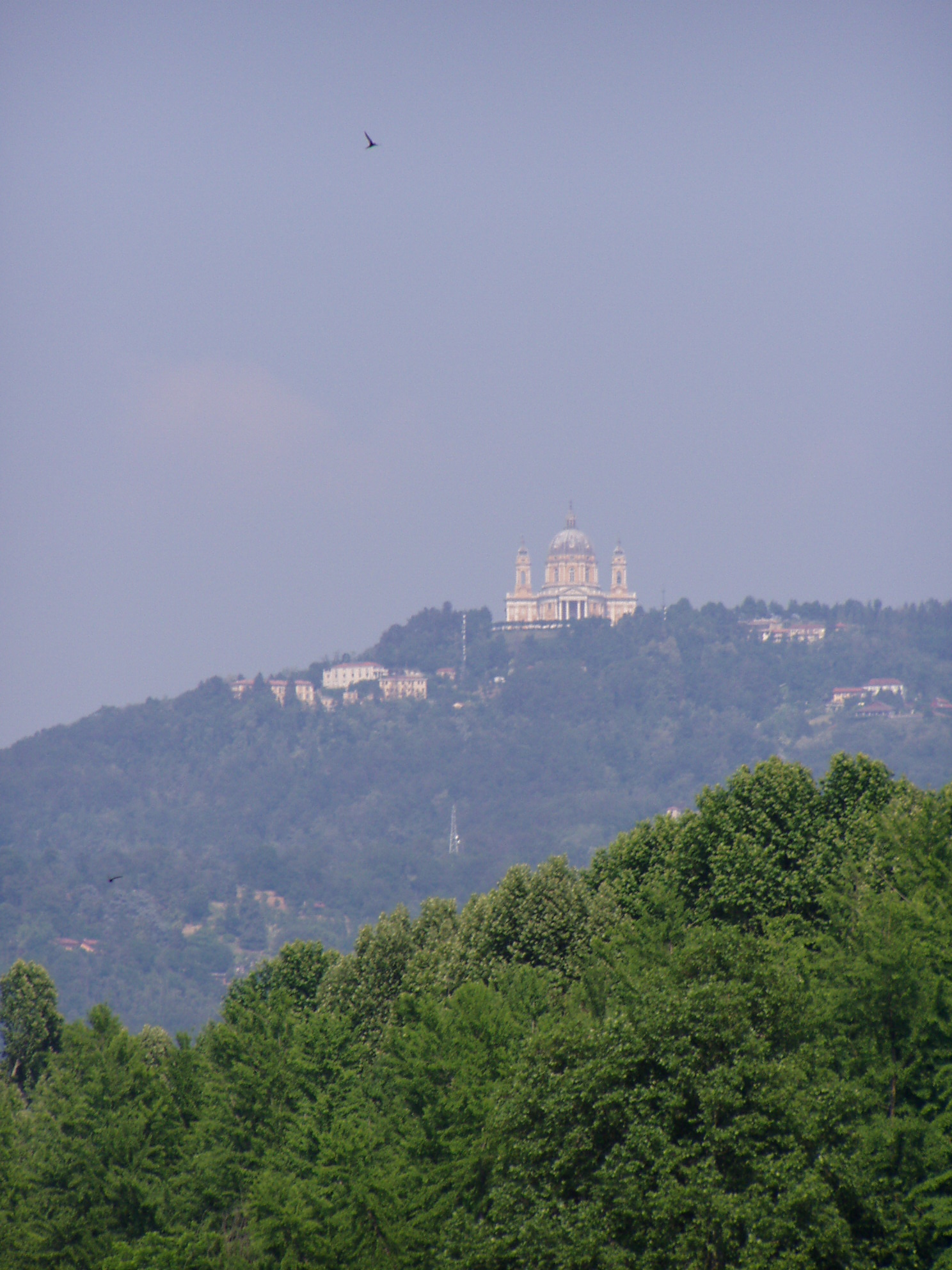
Superga hill in 2004.

Superga (Piedmontese: Soperga or Superga) is a hill situated on the south bank of the river Po to the east of Turin in north-west Italy. At 672 metres (2,205 ft) above sea level, it is one of the most prominent of the hills that ring the city.

Superga is known for the Basilica of Superga and its royal crypt, which is the traditional burial place of members of the House of Savoy; for the Superga Rack Railway that connects it to the Turin suburb of Sassi; and for the Superga air disaster of 1949, in which the entire Torino football team, the Grande Torino, perished.

The hill is used in the Milano–Torino cycling race, and since the 2012 event, the finish has, on two occasions, been moved to the top of the Superga.
