= 1948–49 Serie A =

46th season of top-tier Italian football

Serie A
- Season: 1948–49
- Champions: Torino; 6th title
- Relegated: Modena; Livorno
- Matches: 380
- Goals: 1,110 (2.92 per match)
- Top goalscorer: István Nyers (26 goals)

The 1948-49 Serie A was the forty-seventh edition of the Italian Football Championship. It was the sixteenth Italian Football Championship branded Serie A, since Serie A was launched in 1929. This was the twenty-third season from which the Italian Football Champions adorned their team jerseys in the subsequent season with a Scudetto.

At the request of rival teams Torino were declared champions on 6 May 1949, two days after the Superga air disaster killed their entire first team squad. At the time of the declaration, Torino led the runner-up Internazionale by four points with four matches remaining. Torino's remaining four matches were played by their reserve team, finishing the league five points ahead of the runner up. Torino were thus champions for the sixth time in their history. This was their sixth scudetto since the scudetto started being awarded in 1924 and their fourth win contested as Serie A. This was their last of five consecutive Italian Football Championship wins, punctuated by a two-year break due to World War II.

== Teams ==
Novara for Northern Italy, Padova for Central Italy and Palermo for Southern Italy had been promoted from Serie B.

Serie A 1948-49 team distribution

== Events ==
Following the restoration of ordinary Serie B championship, the FIGC decided to come back to two relegations only from Serie A.

== Final classification ==
Pos	Team	Pld	W	D	L	GF	GA	GD	Pts	Qualification or relegation
1	Torino (C)	38	25	10	3	78	34	+44	60	1949 Latin Cup
2	Internazionale	38	22	11	5	85	39	+46	55	
3	Milan	38	21	8	9	83	52	+31	50	
4	Juventus	38	18	8	12	64	47	+17	44	
5	Sampdoria	38	16	9	13	74	63	+11	41	
6	Bologna	38	11	18	9	53	46	+7	40	
6	Genoa	38	14	12	12	51	51	0	40	
8	Lucchese	38	14	10	14	55	55	0	38	
8	Triestina	38	13	12	13	59	59	0	38	
8	Fiorentina	38	15	8	15	51	60	−9	38	
11	Palermo	38	14	8	16	57	58	−1	36	
11	Padova	38	12	12	14	45	64	−19	36	
13	Lazio	38	11	12	15	60	62	−2	34	
14	Roma	38	12	8	18	47	57	−10	32	
15	Novara	38	12	7	19	52	74	−22	31	
15	Atalanta	38	11	9	18	40	58	−18	31	
17	Pro Patria	38	11	8	19	51	61	−10	30	
17	Bari	38	10	10	18	30	50	−20	30	
19	Modena (R)	38	9	11	18	36	49	−13	29	Relegation to Serie B
20	Livorno (R)	38	9	8	21	39	71	−32	26	Relegation to Serie B

Source: Panini
(C) Champions; (R) Relegated

Note: Goal Difference did not come into effect until the 1960s.

== Results ==
Home \ Away	ATA	BAR	BOL	FIO	GEN	INT	JUV	LAZ	LIV	LUC	MIL	MOD	NOV	PAD	PAL	PPA	ROM	SAM	TOR	TRI
Atalanta		0–2	1–1	2–1	0–0	1–2	2–4	1–1	4–2	2–2	1–1	2–0	3–1	0–1	2–1	0–1	3–0	1–5	3–2	0–1
Bari	0–2		3–0	0–0	0–0	1–2	2–1	0–0	3–0	0–0	0–2	0–1	2–0	1–0	2–1	1–0	0–4	1–2	1–1	1–1
Bologna	1–1	1–0		0–0	2–2	1–3	3–0	2–0	6–2	4–1	3–1	2–0	3–1	0–0	1–0	2–0	1–2	1–2	2–2	1–1
Fiorentina	2–0	0–2	1–0		2–1	0–2	0–0	4–0	3–2	1–0	4–2	1–1	2–0	0–0	0–3	3–1	3–1	1–0	0–0	5–3
Genoa	2–0	2–1	0–0	4–2		4–1	2–1	1–0	3–2	0–0	1–0	1–0	0–4	7–1	1–1	0–2	1–0	0–0	3–0	5–1
Internazionale	4–0	9–1	2–2	7–1	2–1		1–1	1–0	3–1	4–0	4–4	2–0	5–0	1–1	0–0	2–1	1–0	4–2	0–0	1–1
Juventus	1–0	1–0	2–0	3–2	2–1	0–1		4–1	2–2	2–1	1–1	0–1	4–1	6–1	3–2	4–3	0–0	5–1	1–2	2–0
Lazio	1–1	1–1	8–2	2–1	5–1	2–2	0–4		2–0	2–1	2–3	5–1	2–1	1–1	5–1	2–5	0–0	2–0	2–2	4–0
Livorno	0–2	1–0	1–1	1–1	2–2	0–2	1–3	1–1		0–0	2–1	1–0	1–0	2–2	0–2	2–0	2–1	1–0	0–2	1–0
Lucchese	0–1	1–1	1–1	4–0	0–0	0–0	2–1	2–1	0–1		2–2	1–0	5–1	4–0	6–2	1–0	5–1	3–1	1–1	3–1
Milan	3–0	4–1	2–2	3–1	2–2	0–2	1–1	3–0	2–0	4–0		5–1	4–1	2–0	2–1	3–2	3–0	3–2	1–0	3–1
Modena	2–0	0–0	0–1	1–2	2–0	2–3	2–2	2–0	0–0	4–0	0–0		1–1	0–2	4–0	1–1	2–2	2–1	0–1	0–2
Novara	2–0	3–1	1–1	2–0	1–2	1–1	0–0	2–2	3–1	5–2	1–2	2–1		2–1	1–0	1–1	2–1	2–3	0–2	3–0
Padova	3–0	1–0	2–0	2–0	0–0	1–3	3–0	2–0	2–1	0–1	1–4	0–0	3–2		3–3	1–1	2–0	1–3	4–4	0–0
Palermo	1–2	3–0	0–0	0–2	3–0	2–1	2–0	1–0	4–2	1–3	2–1	0–0	3–0	1–0		3–1	2–1	1–1	2–2	4–0
Pro Patria	0–0	0–1	0–3	2–4	2–1	1–1	0–1	1–2	1–0	0–2	3–2	2–0	5–0	3–0	1–0		1–1	1–4	0–1	3–1
Roma	1–0	0–0	1–1	1–1	1–0	1–0	0–1	1–1	4–0	3–0	1–2	2–1	4–1	0–2	3–2	3–1		2–4	1–2	4–2
Sampdoria	4–2	2–1	1–1	2–1	5–1	0–4	2–0	2–2	3–0	5–0	2–1	1–1	1–3	0–0	2–2	4–4	2–0		2–3	1–1
Torino	2–0	2–0	1–0	2–0	4–0	4–2	3–1	1–0	1–0	2–1	4–1	3–1	4–0	3–1	3–0	4–1	4–0	2–1		1–1
Triestina	1–1	2–0	1–1	4–0	0–0	2–0	1–0	4–1	5–4	1–0	1–3	1–2	1–1	9–1	3–1	0–0	2–0	3–1	1–1	

Source: Almanacco Illustrato del Calcio - La Storia 1898-2004, Panini Edizioni, Modena, September 2005 (in Italian)
Legend: Blue = home team win; Yellow = draw; Red = away team win.

== Top goalscorers ==
Rank	Player	Club	Goals
1	(Hungarian People's Republic) István Nyers	Internazionale	26
2	(Italy) Amedeo Amadei	Internazionale	22
3	(Hungarian People's Republic) István Mayer	Bologna	20
4	(Italy) Carlo Stradella	Livorno	19
5	(Italy) Riccardo Carapellese	Milan	17
6	(Italy) Valentino Mazzola	Torino	16
6	(Sweden) Gunnar Nordahl	Milan	16
8	(Italy) Giuseppe Baldini	Sampdoria	15
8	(Italy) Renato Gei	Sampdoria	15
8	(Italy) Giampiero Boniperti	Juventus	15
8	(Denmark) John Hansen	Juventus	15
8	(Italy) Bruno Ispiro	Triestina	15
8	(Italy) Ugo Conti	Lucchese	15
14	(Italy) Silvio Piola	Novara	14
14	(Italy) Adriano Bassetto	Sampdoria	14
