= List of Italy international footballers =

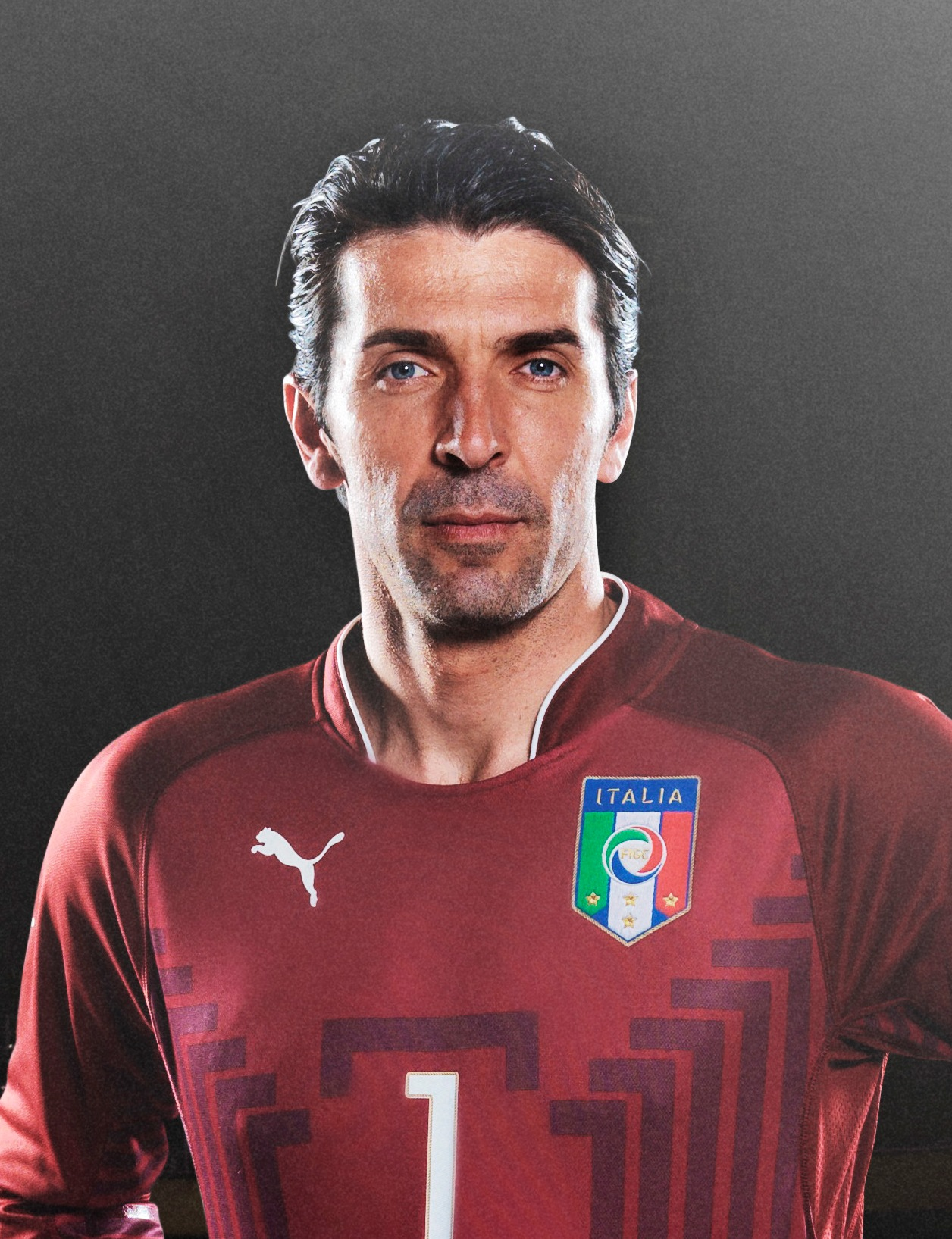
Gianluigi Buffon

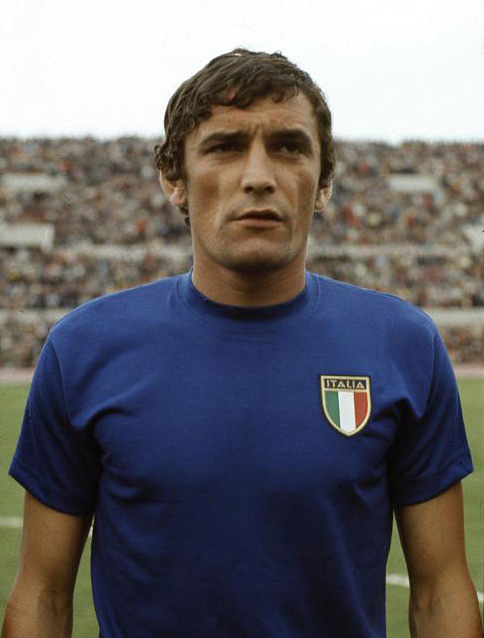
Luigi Riva

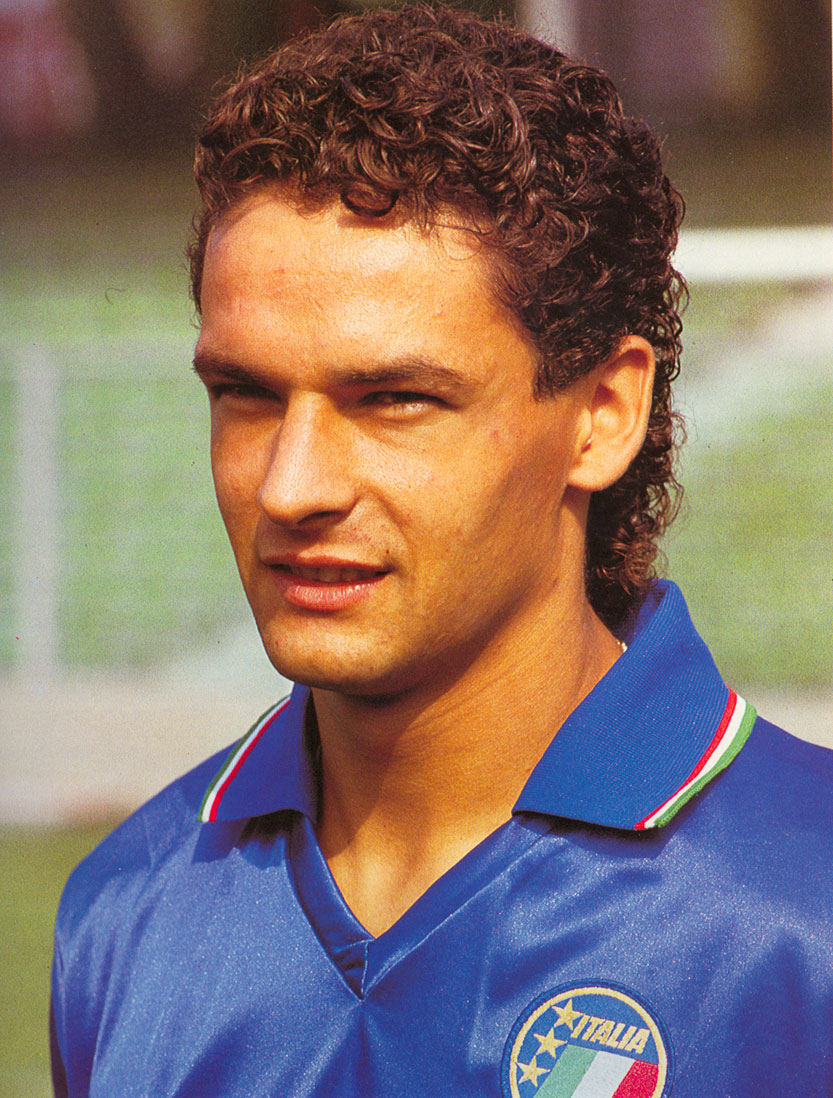
Roberto Baggio

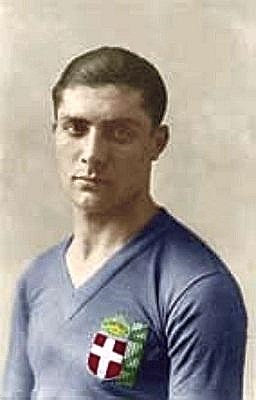
Giuseppe Meazza

Four Italy international footballers: Gianluigi Buffon is the most capped player in the history of Italy with 176 caps; Luigi Riva is the top scorer in the history of Italy with 35 goals; Together with Christian Vieri and Paolo Rossi, Roberto Baggio has scored the most goals at the FIFA World Cup (9); Together with Giovanni Ferrari and Eraldo Monzeglio, Giuseppe Meazza is one of the three only players to have played in two World Cup editions won by Italy (1934 and 1938).

The Italy national football team represents Italy in international association football. The Italian Football Federation, the governing body of football in Italy, fields it, and it competes as a member of the Union of European Football Associations (UEFA), which encompasses the countries of Europe. Italy competed in their first official international football match on 15 May 1910, a 6–2 victory over France in Milan at Arena Civica.

Italy have competed in numerous competitions, and all players, either as a member of the starting eleven or as a substitute, are listed below. Each player's details include their playing position while with the team, the number of caps earned and goals scored in all international matches, the year of their first and last (or most recent) matches played in, as well as any major honours won, ordered alphabetically. All statistics are correct up to and including the match played on 15 November 2026. Players who are still active at the club and/or international level are in bold.

== Key ==
| WC | FIFA World Cup |
| EC | UEFA European Championship |
| CC | FIFA Confederations Cup |
| OLY | Summer Olympic Games |
| NL | UEFA Nations League |
| COC | CONMEBOL–UEFA Cup of Champions |
| 1st place, gold medalist(s) | Tournament winners |
| 2nd place, silver medalist(s) | Tournament runners-up |
| 3rd place, bronze medalist(s) | Tournament third place |
| Pos | Positions |
| GK | Goalkeeper |
| DF | Defender |
| MF | Midfielder |
| FW | Forward |

== List of players ==
| Player | Pos. | Caps | Goals | First cap | Last cap | WC | EC | CC | OLY | NL | COC |
|---|---|---|---|---|---|---|---|---|---|---|---|
| Ignazio Abate | DF | 22 | 1 | 2011 | 2015 | | 2012 (silver) | 2013 (bronze) | | | |
| Christian Abbiati | GK | 4 | 0 | 2003 | 2007 | | 2000 (silver) | | | | |
| **Francesco Acerbi** | DF | 34 | 1 | 2014 | 2023 | | 2020 (gold) | | | 2020–21 (bronze); 2022–23 (bronze) | 2022 (silver) |
| Daniele Adani | DF | 5 | 0 | 2000 | 2004 | | | | | | |
| Ermanno Aebi | MF | 2 | 3 | 1920 | | | | | | | |
| Marcello Agnoletto | MF | 1 | 0 | 1956 | | | | | | | |
| Aldo Agroppi | MF | 5 | 0 | 1972 | 1973 | | | | | | |
| **Honest Ahanor** | DF | 2 | 0 | 2026 | | | | | | | |
| Demetrio Albertini | MF | 79 | 3 | 1991 | 2002 | 1994 (silver) | 2000 (silver) | | | | |
| Enrico Albertosi | GK | 34 | 0 | 1961 | 1972 | 1970 (silver) | 1968 (gold) | | | | |
| Giuseppe Aliberti | MF | 11 | 0 | 1923 | 1925 | | | | | | |
| Luigi Allemandi | DF | 24 | 0 | 1925 | 1936 | 1934 (gold) | | | | | |
| José Altafini | FW | 6 | 5 | 1961 | 1962 | | | | | | |
| Alessandro Altobelli | FW | 61 | 25 | 1980 | 1988 | 1982 (gold) | | | | | |
| Amedeo Amadei | FW | 13 | 7 | 1949 | 1953 | | | | | | |
| Amauri | FW | 1 | 0 | 2010 | | | | | | | |
| Massimo Ambrosini | MF | 35 | 0 | 1999 | 2008 | | 2000 (silver) | | | | |
| Marco Amelia | GK | 9 | 0 | 2005 | 2009 | 2006 (gold) | | | 2004 (bronze) | | |
| Ugo Amoretti | GK | 1 | 0 | 1936 | | | | | | | |
| Pietro Anastasi | FW | 25 | 8 | 1968 | 1975 | | 1968 (gold) | | | | |
| Carlo Ancelotti | MF | 26 | 1 | 1981 | 1991 | 1990 (bronze) | | | | | |
| Michele Andreolo | MF | 26 | 1 | 1936 | 1942 | 1938 (gold) | | | | | |
| Antonio Angelillo | FW | 2 | 1 | 1960 | 1962 | | | | | | |
| Carlo Annovazzi | MF | 17 | 0 | 1947 | 1952 | | | | | | |
| Angelo Anquilletti | DF | 2 | 0 | 1969 | 1969 | | 1968 (gold) | | | | |
| Giancarlo Antognoni | MF | 73 | 7 | 1974 | 1982 | 1982 (gold) | | | | | |
| Luca Antonelli | DF | 13 | 0 | 2010 | 2016 | | | | | | |
| Roberto Anzolin | GK | 1 | 0 | 1966 | | | | | | | |
| Luigi Apolloni | DF | 15 | 1 | 1994 | 1996 | 1994 (silver) | | | | | |
| Alberto Aquilani | MF | 38 | 5 | 2006 | 2014 | | | 2013 (bronze) | | | |
| Guido Ara | MF | 13 | 1 | 1911 | 1920 | | | | | | |
| Bruno Arcari | FW | 1 | 0 | 1937 | | | | | | | |
| Mario Ardissone | MF | 2 | 0 | 1924 | 1924 | | | | | | |
| Antonino Asta | MF | 1 | 0 | 2002 | | | | | | | |
| Giuseppe Asti | FW | 1 | 0 | 1920 | | | | | | | |
| Davide Astori | DF | 14 | 1 | 2011 | 2017 | | | 2013 (bronze) | | | |
| Giovanni Azzini | MF | 1 | 0 | 1952 | | | | | | | |
| Jonathan Bachini | MF | 2 | 0 | 1998 | 1999 | | | | | | |
| Valerio Bacigalupo | GK | 5 | 0 | 1947 | 1949 | | | | | | |
| Emilio Badini | MF | 2 | 1 | 1920 | | | | | | | |
| Dino Baggio | MF | 60 | 7 | 1991 | 1999 | 1994 (silver) | | | | | |
| Roberto Baggio | FW | 56 | 27 | 1988 | 2004 | 1990 (bronze); 1994 (silver) | | | | | |
| Salvatore Bagni | MF | 41 | 5 | 1981 | 1987 | | | | | | |
| Francesco Baiano | FW | 2 | 0 | 1991 | 1992 | | | | | | |
| Gastone Baldi | MF | 3 | 0 | 1922 | 1925 | | | | | | |
| Giuseppe Baldini | FW | 1 | 0 | 1949 | | | | | | | |
| Giuseppe Baldo | MF | 4 | 0 | 1936 | | | | | 1936 (gold) | | |
| Dino Ballacci | DF | 1 | 0 | 1954 | | | | | | | |
| Aldo Ballarin | DF | 9 | 0 | 1945 | 1949 | | | | | | |
| Adolfo Baloncieri | MF | 47 | 25 | 1920 | 1930 | | | | 1928 (bronze) | | |
| **Mario Balotelli** | FW | 36 | 14 | 2010 | 2018 | | 2012 (silver) | 2013 (bronze) | | | |
| Federico Balzaretti | DF | 16 | 0 | 2010 | 2013 | | 2012 (silver) | | | | |
| Elvio Banchero | FW | 3 | 4 | 1928 | 1928 | | | | 1928 (bronze) | | |
| Luigi Barbesino | MF | 5 | 1 | 1912 | 1914 | | | | | | |
| Ottavio Barbieri | MF | 21 | 0 | 1921 | 1930 | | | | | | |
| **Nicolò Barella** | MF | 75 | 10 | 2018 | 2026 | | 2020 (gold) | | | 2020–21 (bronze); 2022–23 (bronze) | 2022 (silver) |
| Franco Baresi | DF | 81 | 1 | 1982 | 1994 | 1982 (gold); 1990 (bronze); 1994 (silver) | | | | | |
| Giuseppe Baresi | MF | 17 | 0 | 1979 | 1986 | | | | | | |
| Paolo Barison | FW | 9 | 6 | 1958 | 1966 | | | | | | |
| Simone Barone | MF | 16 | 1 | 2004 | 2006 | 2006 (gold) | | | | | |
| Roberto Baronio | MF | 1 | 0 | 2005 | | | | | | | |
| **Davide Bartesaghi** | DF | 2 | 0 | 2026 | | | | | | | |
| Andrea Barzagli | DF | 73 | 0 | 2004 | 2017 | 2006 (gold) | 2012 (silver) | 2013 (bronze) | 2004 (bronze) | | |
| **Daniele Baselli** | MF | 1 | 0 | 2018 | | | | | | | |
| Adriano Bassetto | MF | 3 | 0 | 1954 | 1955 | | | | | | |
| **Alessandro Bastoni** | DF | 48 | 5 | 2020 | 2026 | | 2020 (gold) | | | 2020–21 (bronze) | 2022 (silver) |
| Sergio Battistini | DF | 4 | 1 | 1984 | | | | | | | |
| Giovanni Battistoni | MF | 2 | 0 | 1939 | | | | | | | |
| Fabio Bazzani | FW | 3 | 0 | 2003 | 2004 | | | | | | |
| Gastone Bean | FW | 4 | 0 | 1957 | 1958 | | | | | | |
| Enzo Bearzot | MF | 1 | 0 | 1955 | | | | | | | |
| Fosco Becattini | DF | 2 | 0 | 1949 | | | | | | | |
| Gianfranco Bedin | MF | 6 | 0 | 1966 | 1972 | | | | | | |
| **Raoul Bellanova** | DF | 6 | 0 | 2024 | 2025 | | | | | | |
| Delfo Bellini | DF | 8 | 0 | 1924 | 1927 | | | | 1928 (bronze) | | |
| Mauro Bellugi | DF | 32 | 0 | 1972 | 1979 | | | | | | |
| **Andrea Belotti** | FW | 44 | 12 | 2016 | 2022 | | 2020 (gold) | | | | 2022 (silver) |
| Antonio Benarrivo | DF | 23 | 0 | 1993 | 1997 | 1994 (silver) | | | | | |
| Romeo Benetti | MF | 55 | 2 | 1971 | 1980 | | | | | | |
| **Domenico Berardi** | FW | 28 | 8 | 2018 | 2023 | | 2020 (gold) | | | 2020–21 (bronze) | |
| Felice Berardo | FW | 14 | 2 | 1911 | 1920 | | | | | | |
| Giancarlo Bercellino | DF | 6 | 0 | 1965 | 1968 | | 1968 (gold) | | | | |
| Mario Bergamaschi | MF | 5 | 1 | 1954 | 1958 | | | | | | |
| Augusto Bergamino | FW | 5 | 0 | 1919 | 1923 | | | | | | |
| Giuseppe Bergomi | DF | 81 | 6 | 1982 | 1998 | 1982 (gold); 1990 (bronze) | | | | | |
| **Federico Bernardeschi** | FW | 39 | 6 | 2016 | 2022 | | 2020 (gold) | | | 2020–21 (bronze) | 2022 (silver) |
| Fulvio Bernardini | MF | 26 | 3 | 1925 | 1932 | | | | 1928 (bronze) | | |
| Gaudenzio Bernasconi | MF | 6 | 0 | 1956 | 1959 | | | | | | |
| Nicola Berti | MF | 39 | 3 | 1988 | 1995 | 1990 (bronze); 1994 (silver) | | | | | |
| Mario Bertini | MF | 25 | 2 | 1966 | 1972 | 1970 (silver) | | | | | |
| Andrea Bertolacci | MF | 5 | 0 | 2014 | 2015 | | | | | | |
| Luigi Bertolini | MF | 26 | 0 | 1929 | 1935 | 1934 (gold) | | | | | |
| Sergio Bertoni | FW | 6 | 1 | 1936 | 1940 | 1938 (gold) | | | 1936 (gold) | | |
| Valerio Bertotto | DF | 4 | 0 | 2000 | 2001 | | | | | | |
| Alberto Bertuccelli | DF | 6 | 0 | 1949 | 1952 | | | | | | |
| Aldo Bet | DF | 2 | 0 | 1971 | | | | | | | |
| Stefano Bettarini | DF | 1 | 0 | 2004 | | | | | | | |
| Roberto Bettega | FW | 42 | 19 | 1975 | 1983 | | | | | | |
| Carlo Biagi | MF | 4 | 4 | 1936 | | | | | 1936 (gold) | | |
| Alessandro Bianchi | MF | 9 | 0 | 1992 | 1994 | | | | | | |
| Ottavio Bianchi | MF | 2 | 0 | 1966 | | | | | | | |
| Amedeo Biavati | FW | 18 | 8 | 1938 | 1947 | 1938 (gold) | | | | | |
| Carlo Bigatto | MF | 5 | 0 | 1925 | 1927 | | | | | | |
| Angelo Binaschi | DF | 9 | 0 | 1911 | 1913 | | | | | | |
| **Cristiano Biraghi** | DF | 16 | 1 | 2018 | 2023 | | | | | | |
| Davide Biondini | MF | 2 | 0 | 2009 | | | | | | | |
| Alessandro Birindelli | DF | 6 | 0 | 2002 | 2004 | | | | | | |
| Manuele Blasi | MF | 8 | 0 | 2004 | 2005 | | | | | | |
| Ivano Blason | DF | 1 | 0 | 1950 | | | | | | | |
| Salvatore Bocchetti | DF | 5 | 0 | 2009 | 2010 | | | | | | |
| Aldo Boffi | FW | 2 | 0 | 1938 | 1939 | | | | | | |
| Arturo Boiocchi | FW | 6 | 2 | 1910 | 1914 | | | | | | |
| Bruno Bolchi | MF | 4 | 0 | 1961 | | | | | | | |
| Giacomo Bonaventura | MF | 18 | 1 | 2013 | 2024 | | | | | | |
| Emiliano Bonazzoli | FW | 1 | 0 | 2006 | | | | | | | |
| Daniele Bonera | DF | 16 | 0 | 2001 | 2008 | | | | 2004 (bronze) | | |
| Dario Bonetti | DF | 2 | 0 | 1986 | | | | | | | |
| Ernesto Bonino | FW | 2 | 0 | 1921 | 1922 | | | | | | |
| Roberto Boninsegna | FW | 22 | 9 | 1967 | 1974 | 1970 (silver) | | | | | |
| Giampiero Boniperti | FW | 38 | 8 | 1947 | 1960 | | | | | | |
| Andrea Bonomi | DF | 1 | 0 | 1951 | | | | | | | |
| Franco Bontadini | MF | 4 | 2 | 1912 | 1912 | | | | | | |
| Leonardo Bonucci | DF | 121 | 8 | 2010 | 2023 | | 2012 (silver); 2020 (gold) | 2013 (bronze) | | 2020–21 (bronze); 2022–23 (bronze) | 2022 (silver) |
| Ivano Bordon | GK | 22 | 0 | 1978 | 1985 | 1982 (gold) | | | | | |
| Felice Borel | FW | 3 | 1 | 1933 | 1934 | 1934 (gold) | | | | | |
| Francesco Borello | FW | 1 | 0 | 1924 | | | | | | | |
| Giovanni Borgato | DF | 1 | 0 | 1926 | | | | | | | |
| Stefano Borgonovo | FW | 3 | 0 | 1989 | 1989 | | | | | | |
| Fabio Borini | FW | 1 | 0 | 2012 | | | 2012 (silver) | | | | |
| Marco Borriello | FW | 7 | 0 | 2008 | 2011 | | | | | | |
| Raoul Bortoletto | MF | 1 | 0 | 1953 | | | | | | | |
| **Marco Brescianini** | MF | 2 | 0 | 2024 | | | | | | | |
| Guglielmo Brezzi | FW | 8 | 5 | 1920 | 1923 | | | | | | |
| Franco Brienza | MF | 2 | 0 | 2005 | | | | | | | |
| Sergio Brighenti | FW | 9 | 2 | 1959 | 1961 | | | | | | |
| Matteo Brighi | MF | 4 | 0 | 2002 | 2009 | | | | | | |
| Cristian Brocchi | MF | 1 | 0 | 2006 | | | | | | | |
| Antonio Bruna | DF | 5 | 0 | 1920 | | | | | | | |
| Luca Bucci | GK | 3 | 0 | 1994 | 1995 | 1994 (silver) | | | | | |
| Gianluigi Buffon | GK | 176 | 0 | 1997 | 2018 | 2006 (gold) | 2012 (silver) | 2013 (bronze) | | | |
| Lorenzo Buffon | GK | 15 | 0 | 1958 | 1962 | | | | | | |
| Ottavio Bugatti | GK | 7 | 0 | 1952 | 1958 | | | | | | |
| Giacomo Bulgarelli | MF | 29 | 7 | 1962 | 1967 | | 1968 (gold) | | | | |
| **Alessandro Buongiorno** | DF | 12 | 0 | 2023 | 2025 | | | | | 2022–23 (bronze) | |
| Tarcisio Burgnich | DF | 66 | 2 | 1963 | 1974 | 1970 (silver) | 1968 (gold) | | | | |
| Ruben Buriani | MF | 2 | 0 | 1980 | 1980 | | | | | | |
| Renzo Burini | FW | 4 | 1 | 1951 | 1955 | | | | | | |
| Luigi Burlando | MF | 19 | 1 | 1920 | 1925 | | | | | | |
| Pietro Buscaglia | MF | 1 | 0 | 1937 | | | | | | | |
| Antonio Busini | MF | 1 | 0 | 1929 | | | | | | | |
| Antonio Cabrini | DF | 73 | 9 | 1978 | 1987 | 1982 (gold) | | | | | |
| Giancarlo Cadé | MF | 1 | 0 | 1952 | | | | | | | |
| **Davide Calabria** | DF | 7 | 0 | 2020 | 2022 | | | | | 2020–21 (bronze) | |
| **Riccardo Calafiori** | DF | 19 | 1 | 2024 | 2026 | | | | | | |
| Mattia Caldara | DF | 2 | 0 | 2018 | | | | | | | |
| Umberto Caligaris | DF | 59 | 0 | 1922 | 1934 | 1934 (gold) | | | 1928 (bronze) | | |
| Francesco Calì | DF | 2 | 0 | 1910 | 1910 | | | | | | |
| **Francesco Camarda** | FW | 2 | 0 | 2026 | | | | | | | |
| **Andrea Cambiaso** | DF | 19 | 3 | 2024 | 2025 | | | | | | |
| **Nicolò Cambiaghi** | FW | 4 | 0 | 2025 | 2026 | | | | | | |
| Angelo Cameroni | GK | 1 | 0 | 1920 | | | | | | | |
| Mauro Camoranesi | MF | 55 | 5 | 2003 | 2010 | 2006 (gold) | | | | | |
| Aldo Campatelli | MF | 7 | 0 | 1939 | 1950 | | | | | | |
| Piero Campelli | GK | 11 | 0 | 1912 | 1920 | | | | | | |
| **Matteo Cancellieri** | FW | 1 | 0 | 2022 | | | | | | | |
| Antonio Candreva | MF | 54 | 7 | 2009 | 2018 | | | 2013 (bronze) | | | |
| Fabio Cannavaro | DF | 136 | 2 | 1997 | 2010 | 2006 (gold) | 2000 (silver) | | | | |
| Domenico Capello | MF | 2 | 0 | 1910 | 1910 | | | | | | |
| Fabio Capello | MF | 32 | 8 | 1972 | 1976 | | | | | | |
| Giulio Cappelli | FW | 2 | 1 | 1936 | | | | | 1936 (gold) | | |
| Renato Cappellini | FW | 2 | 1 | 1967 | | | | | | | |
| Gino Cappello | FW | 11 | 3 | 1949 | 1954 | | | | | | |
| Massimiliano Cappioli | MF | 1 | 0 | 1994 | | | | | | | |
| Carlo Capra | DF | 1 | 0 | 1915 | | | | | | | |
| Egidio Capra | FW | 2 | 0 | 1937 | 1937 | | | | | | |
| **Gianluca Caprari** | FW | 1 | 0 | 2022 | | | | | | | |
| Emilio Caprile | FW | 2 | 2 | 1948 | 1950 | | | | | | |
| Francesco Caputo | FW | 2 | 1 | 2020 | | | | | | | |
| Andrea Caracciolo | FW | 2 | 0 | 2004 | 2006 | | | | | | |
| Riccardo Carapellese | FW | 16 | 10 | 1947 | 1956 | | | | | | |
| Amedeo Carboni | DF | 18 | 0 | 1991 | 1997 | | | | | | |
| Carlo Carcano | MF | 5 | 1 | 1915 | 1921 | | | | | | |
| Daniele Carnasciali | DF | 2 | 0 | 1993 | 1996 | | | | | | |
| Andrea Carnevale | FW | 10 | 2 | 1988 | 1990 | 1990 (bronze) | | | | | |
| Gustavo Carrer | FW | 2 | 1 | 1911 | 1911 | | | | | | |
| Massimo Carrera | DF | 1 | 0 | 1992 | | | | | | | |
| Ercole Carzino | MF | 1 | 0 | 1921 | | | | | | | |
| Claudio Casanova | DF | 1 | 0 | 1914 | | | | | | | |
| Giuseppe Casari | GK | 6 | 0 | 1948 | 1951 | | | | | | |
| Pierluigi Casiraghi | FW | 44 | 13 | 1991 | 1998 | 1994 (silver) | | | | | |
| Domenico Caso | MF | 1 | 0 | 1974 | | | | | | | |
| Mattia Cassani | DF | 11 | 0 | 2009 | 2012 | | | | | | |
| Valerio Cassani | MF | 2 | 0 | 1948 | | | | | | | |
| Antonio Cassano | FW | 39 | 10 | 2003 | 2014 | | 2012 (silver) | | | | |
| Marco Cassetti | DF | 5 | 0 | 2005 | 2008 | | | | | | |
| Ernesto Castano | DF | 7 | 0 | 1959 | 1969 | | 1968 (gold) | | | | |
| Armando Castellazzi | MF | 3 | 0 | 1929 | 1934 | 1934 (gold) | | | | | |
| Sergio Castelletti | DF | 7 | 0 | 1958 | 1962 | | | | | | |
| Luciano Castellini | GK | 1 | 0 | 1977 | | | | | | | |
| Marcello Castellini | DF | 1 | 0 | 2003 | | | | | | | |
| Eusebio Castigliano | MF | 7 | 1 | 1945 | 1949 | | | | | | |
| **Gaetano Castrovilli** | MF | 4 | 0 | 2019 | 2021 | | 2020 (gold) | | | | |
| Renato Cattaneo | FW | 2 | 1 | 1931 | 1931 | | | | | | |
| Edoardo Catto | FW | 1 | 0 | 1924 | | | | | | | |
| Franco Causio | FW | 63 | 6 | 1972 | 1983 | 1982 (gold) | | | | | |
| Emidio Cavigioli | FW | 2 | 3 | 1948 | | | | | | | |
| Celestino Celio | MF | 1 | 0 | 1954 | | | | | | | |
| Pierluigi Cera | MF | 18 | 0 | 1969 | 1972 | 1970 (silver) | | | | | |
| Alessio Cerci | FW | 14 | 0 | 2013 | 2014 | | | 2013 (bronze) | | | |
| Carlo Ceresoli | GK | 8 | 0 | 1934 | 1938 | 1938 (gold) | | | | | |
| Sergio Cervato | DF | 28 | 4 | 1951 | 1960 | | | | | | |
| Cesarino Cervellati | FW | 6 | 0 | 1951 | 1961 | | | | | | |
| Renato Cesarini | MF | 11 | 3 | 1931 | 1934 | | | | | | |
| Aldo Cevenini | FW | 11 | 3 | 1910 | 1915 | | | | | | |
| Luigi Cevenini | FW | 29 | 11 | 1915 | 1929 | | | | | | |
| **Luigi Cherubini** | FW | 1 | 0 | 2026 | | | | | | | |
| Giuseppe Chiappella | MF | 17 | 0 | 1953 | 1957 | | | | | | |
| **Fabio Chiarodia** | DF | 2 | 0 | 2026 | | | | | | | |
| Luciano Chiarugi | FW | 3 | 0 | 1969 | 1974 | | | | | | |
| Giorgio Chiellini | DF | 117 | 8 | 2004 | 2022 | | 2012 (silver); 2020 (gold) | 2013 (bronze) | 2004 (bronze) | 2020–21 (bronze) | 2022 (silver) |
| Enrico Chiesa | FW | 18 | 7 | 1996 | 2001 | | | | | | |
| **Federico Chiesa** | FW | 51 | 7 | 2018 | 2024 | | 2020 (gold) | | | 2020–21 (bronze); 2022–23 (bronze) | |
| Giorgio Chinaglia | FW | 14 | 4 | 1972 | 1975 | | | | | | |
| **Alphadjo Cisse** | FW | 1 | 0 | 2026 | | | | | | | |
| Francesco Coco | DF | 17 | 0 | 2000 | 2002 | | | | | | |
| Sandro Cois | MF | 3 | 0 | 1998 | 1999 | | | | | | |
| Gino Colaussi | FW | 25 | 15 | 1935 | 1940 | 1938 (gold) | | | | | |
| Fulvio Collovati | DF | 50 | 3 | 1979 | 1986 | 1982 (gold) | | | | | |
| Enrico Colombari | MF | 9 | 0 | 1928 | 1933 | | | | | | |
| Umberto Colombo | MF | 3 | 0 | 1959 | 1960 | | | | | | |
| Gianpiero Combi | GK | 47 | 0 | 1924 | 1934 | 1934 (gold) | | | 1928 (bronze) | | |
| **Pietro Comuzzo** | DF | 2 | 0 | 2026 | | | | | | | |
| Antonio Conte | MF | 20 | 2 | 1994 | 2000 | 1994 (silver) | 2000 (silver) | | | | |
| Andrea Conti | DF | 1 | 0 | 2017 | | | | | | | |
| Bruno Conti | FW | 47 | 5 | 1980 | 1986 | 1982 (gold) | | | | | |
| Leopoldo Conti | FW | 31 | 8 | 1920 | 1929 | | | | | | |
| Paolo Conti | GK | 7 | 0 | 1977 | 1979 | | | | | | |
| Carmine Coppola | MF | 2 | 0 | 2005 | | | | | | | |
| **Diego Coppola** | DF | 3 | 0 | 2025 | 2026 | | | | | | |
| Guido Corbelli | FW | 1 | 1 | 1940 | | | | | | | |
| Franco Cordova | MF | 2 | 0 | 1975 | | | | | | | |
| Carlo Corna | FW | 8 | 0 | 1911 | 1915 | | | | | | |
| Bernardo Corradi | FW | 13 | 2 | 2003 | 2004 | | | | | | |
| Giuseppe Corradi | DF | 8 | 0 | 1952 | 1958 | | | | | | |
| Giordano Corsi | MF | 6 | 0 | 1935 | 1937 | | | | | | |
| Mario Corso | FW | 23 | 4 | 1961 | 1971 | | | | | | |
| Andrea Cossu | MF | 2 | 0 | 2010 | 2010 | | | | | | |
| Giovanni Costa | GK | 1 | 0 | 1924 | | | | | | | |
| Alessandro Costacurta | DF | 59 | 2 | 1991 | 1998 | 1994 (silver) | | | | | |
| Leonardo Costagliola | GK | 3 | 0 | 1953 | 1954 | | | | | | |
| Raffaele Costantino | FW | 23 | 8 | 1929 | 1933 | | | | | | |
| **Alessio Cragno** | GK | 2 | 0 | 2020 | 2021 | | | | | | 2022 (silver) |
| Massimo Crippa | MF | 17 | 1 | 1988 | 1996 | | | | | | |
| Domenico Criscito | DF | 26 | 0 | 2009 | 2018 | | | | | | |
| **Bryan Cristante** | MF | 48 | 2 | 2017 | 2026 | | 2020 (gold) | | | 2020–21 (bronze); 2022–23 (bronze) | 2022 (silver) |
| Antonello Cuccureddu | MF | 13 | 0 | 1975 | 1978 | | | | | | |
| **Patrick Cutrone** | FW | 1 | 0 | 2018 | | | | | | | |
| Gaetano D'Agostino | MF | 5 | 0 | 2009 | 2009 | | | | | | |
| Danilo D'Ambrosio | DF | 6 | 0 | 2017 | 2020 | | | | | | |
| Dino da Costa | FW | 1 | 1 | 1958 | | | | | | | |
| **Matteo Dagasso** | MF | 2 | 0 | 2026 | | | | | | | |
| Dario Dainelli | DF | 1 | 0 | 2005 | | | | | | | |
| Oscar Damiani | FW | 2 | 0 | 1974 | 1974 | | | | | | |
| Luigi Danova | DF | 1 | 0 | 1976 | | | | | | | |
| **Matteo Darmian** | DF | 46 | 2 | 2014 | 2024 | | | | | 2022–23 (bronze) | |
| Mario David | DF | 3 | 0 | 1958 | 1962 | | | | | | |
| Luigi De Agostini | DF | 36 | 4 | 1987 | 1991 | 1990 (bronze) | | | | | |
| Adevildo De Marchi | FW | 1 | 0 | 1920 | | | | | | | |
| Carlo De Marchi | MF | 1 | 0 | 1912 | | | | | | | |
| Fernando De Napoli | MF | 54 | 1 | 1986 | 1992 | 1990 (bronze) | | | | | |
| Gracco De Nardo | DF | 2 | 0 | 1920 | 1921 | | | | | | |
| Virginio De Paoli | FW | 3 | 1 | 1966 | 1966 | | | | | | |
| Giovanni De Prà | GK | 19 | 0 | 1924 | 1928 | | | | 1928 (bronze) | | |
| Daniele De Rossi | MF | 117 | 21 | 2004 | 2017 | 2006 (gold) | 2012 (silver) | 2013 (bronze) | 2004 (bronze) | | |
| Morgan De Sanctis | GK | 6 | 0 | 2005 | 2012 | | 2012 (silver) | | | | |
| **Mattia De Sciglio** | DF | 40 | 0 | 2013 | 2022 | | | 2013 (bronze) | | | |
| **Lorenzo De Silvestri** | DF | 6 | 0 | 2010 | 2016 | | | | | | |
| Mario De Simoni | GK | 7 | 0 | 1910 | 1914 | | | | | | |
| Giancarlo De Sisti | MF | 29 | 4 | 1967 | 1972 | 1970 (silver) | 1968 (gold) | | | | |
| Renzo De Vecchi | DF | 43 | 0 | 1910 | 1925 | | | | | | |
| Enrico Debernardi | FW | 3 | 1 | 1910 | 1911 | | | | | | |
| Alessandro Del Piero | FW | 91 | 27 | 1995 | 2008 | 2006 (gold) | 2000 (silver) | | | | |
| Giuseppe Della Valle | FW | 17 | 6 | 1923 | 1930 | | | | | | |
| Gennaro Delvecchio | MF | 1 | 0 | 2006 | | | | | | | |
| Marco Delvecchio | FW | 22 | 4 | 1998 | 2004 | | 2000 (silver) | | | | |
| Atilio Demaría | FW | 13 | 3 | 1932 | 1940 | 1934 (gold) | | | | | |
| Teobaldo Depetrini | MF | 12 | 0 | 1936 | 1946 | | | | | | |
| Mattia Destro | FW | 8 | 1 | 2012 | 2014 | | | | | | |
| Luigi Di Biagio | MF | 31 | 2 | 1998 | 2002 | | 2000 (silver) | | | | |
| Alberto Di Chiara | DF | 7 | 0 | 1992 | 1993 | | | | | | |
| Eusebio Di Francesco | MF | 12 | 1 | 1997 | 2000 | | | | | | |
| Antonio Di Gennaro | MF | 15 | 4 | 1984 | 1986 | | | | | | |
| Beniamino Di Giacomo | FW | 1 | 0 | 1964 | | | | | | | |
| Angelo Di Livio | MF | 40 | 0 | 1995 | 2002 | | 2000 (silver) | | | | |
| **Giovanni Di Lorenzo** | DF | 56 | 5 | 2019 | 2026 | | 2020 (gold) | | | 2020–21 (bronze); 2022–23 (bronze) | 2022 (silver) |
| Roberto Di Matteo | MF | 34 | 2 | 1994 | 1998 | | | | | | |
| Fabrizio Di Mauro | MF | 3 | 0 | 1991 | 1993 | | | | | | |
| David Di Michele | FW | 6 | 0 | 2005 | 2006 | | | | | | |
| Antonio Di Natale | FW | 42 | 11 | 2002 | 2012 | | 2012 (silver) | | | | |
| Marco Di Vaio | FW | 17 | 2 | 2001 | 2004 | | | | | | |
| Alessandro Diamanti | MF | 17 | 1 | 2010 | 2013 | | 2012 (silver) | 2013 (bronze) | | | |
| Aimo Diana | DF | 13 | 1 | 2004 | 2007 | | | | | | |
| **Federico Dimarco** | DF | 40 | 3 | 2022 | 2026 | | | | | 2022–23 (bronze) | |
| Angelo Domenghini | FW | 33 | 7 | 1963 | 1972 | 1970 (silver) | 1968 (gold) | | | | |
| Roberto Donadoni | MF | 63 | 5 | 1986 | 1996 | 1990 (bronze); 1994 (silver) | | | | | |
| Cristiano Doni | MF | 7 | 1 | 2001 | 2002 | | | | | | |
| **Gianluigi Donnarumma** | GK | 89 | 0 | 2016 | 2026 | | 2020 (gold) | | | 2020–21 (bronze); 2022–23 (bronze) | 2022 (silver) |
| Andrea Dossena | MF | 10 | 0 | 2007 | 2009 | | | | | | |
| Giuseppe Dossena | MF | 38 | 1 | 1981 | 1987 | 1982 (gold) | | | | | |
| **Issa Doumbia** | MF | 6 | 0 | 2026 | | | | | | | |
| Bruno Dugoni | MF | 4 | 0 | 1925 | 1932 | | | | | | |
| Éder | FW | 26 | 6 | 2015 | 2017 | | | | | | |
| **Jeff Ekhator** | FW | 1 | 0 | 2026 | | | | | | | |
| Alberto Eliani | DF | 2 | 0 | 1948 | 1948 | | | | | | |
| **Stephan El Shaarawy** | FW | 32 | 7 | 2012 | 2024 | | | 2013 (bronze) | | | |
| Flavio Emoli | MF | 1 | 0 | 1958 | | | | | | | |
| Stefano Eranio | MF | 20 | 3 | 1990 | 1997 | | | | | | |
| **Francesco Pio Esposito** | FW | 15 | 10 | 2025 | 2026 | | | | | | |
| Mauro Esposito | MF | 6 | 0 | 2004 | 2006 | | | | | | |
| Salvatore Esposito (b. 1948) | MF | 1 | 0 | 1975 | | | | | | | |
| **Salvatore Esposito** (b. 2000) | MF | 1 | 0 | 2022 | | | | | | | |
| **Sebastiano Esposito** | FW | 3 | 0 | 2026 | | | | | | | |
| Alberigo Evani | MF | 15 | 0 | 1991 | 1994 | 1994 (silver) | | | | | |
| **Diego Fabbrini** | MF | 1 | 0 | 2012 | | | | | | | |
| Giacinto Facchetti | DF | 94 | 3 | 1963 | 1977 | 1970 (silver) | 1968 (gold) | | | | |
| Ricardo Faccio | MF | 5 | 0 | 1935 | 1936 | | | | | | |
| **Nicolò Fagioli** | MF | 10 | 0 | 2022 | 2026 | | | | | | |
| Giulio Falcone | DF | 1 | 0 | 2006 | | | | | | | |
| Pietro Fanna | MF | 14 | 0 | 1983 | 1985 | | | | | | |
| Otávio Fantoni | MF | 1 | 0 | 1934 | | | | | | | |
| Giuseppe Farina | DF | 1 | 0 | 1956 | | | | | | | |
| Vittorio Faroppa | GK | 1 | 0 | 1912 | | | | | | | |
| **Giacomo Faticanti** | MF | 1 | 0 | 2026 | | | | | | | |
| Osvaldo Fattori | MF | 4 | 0 | 1949 | | | | | | | |
| Giuseppe Favalli | DF | 8 | 0 | 1994 | 2004 | | | | | | |
| **Costantino Favasuli** | DF | 2 | 0 | 2026 | | | | | | | |
| Antonio Fayenz | MF | 4 | 0 | 1925 | 1926 | | | | | | |
| Francisco Fedullo | MF | 2 | 3 | 1932 | | | | | | | |
| **Luiz Felipe** | DF | 1 | 0 | 2022 | | | | | | | |
| Ugo Ferrante | DF | 3 | 0 | 1970 | 1971 | 1970 (silver) | | | | | |
| Ciro Ferrara | DF | 49 | 0 | 1987 | 2000 | 1990 (bronze) | 2000 (silver) | | | | |
| **Gian Marco Ferrari** | DF | 1 | 1 | 2021 | | | | | | | |
| Giovanni Ferrari | MF | 44 | 14 | 1930 | 1938 | 1934 (gold); 1938 (gold) | | | | | |
| Matteo Ferrari | DF | 11 | 0 | 2002 | 2004 | | | | 2004 (bronze) | | |
| Pietro Ferrari | GK | 1 | 0 | 1940 | | | | | | | |
| Rino Ferrario | MF | 10 | 0 | 1952 | 1958 | | | | | | |
| Attilio Ferraris | MF | 28 | 0 | 1926 | 1935 | 1934 (gold) | | | 1928 (bronze) | | |
| Pietro Ferraris | FW | 14 | 3 | 1935 | 1947 | | | | | | |
| Pio Ferraris | FW | 4 | 1 | 1920 | 1921 | | | | | | |
| Riccardo Ferri | DF | 45 | 4 | 1986 | 1992 | 1990 (bronze) | | | | | |
| Giorgio Ferrini | MF | 7 | 0 | 1962 | 1968 | | 1968 (gold) | | | | |
| **Seydou Fini** | FW | 2 | 0 | 2026 | | | | | | | |
| Stefano Fiore | MF | 38 | 2 | 2000 | 2004 | | 2000 (silver) | | | | |
| Eddie Firmani | FW | 3 | 2 | 1956 | 1958 | | | | | | |
| Alessandro Florenzi | DF | 49 | 2 | 2012 | 2022 | | 2020 (gold) | | | | 2022 (silver) |
| Pasquale Foggia | MF | 3 | 1 | 2007 | 2009 | | | | | | |
| Romano Fogli | MF | 13 | 0 | 1958 | 1967 | | | | | | |
| **Michael Folorunsho** | MF | 2 | 0 | 2024 | | | | | | | |
| Alfredo Foni | DF | 23 | 0 | 1936 | 1942 | 1938 (gold) | | | 1936 (gold) | | |
| Alfio Fontana | MF | 3 | 0 | 1957 | 1960 | | | | | | |
| Alberto Fontanesi | FW | 3 | 1 | 1952 | 1953 | | | | | | |
| Giuseppe Forlivesi | FW | 10 | 2 | 1920 | 1925 | | | | | | |
| **Niccolò Fortini** | DF | 1 | 0 | 2026 | | | | | | | |
| Andrea Fortunato | DF | 1 | 0 | 1993 | | | | | | | |
| Virgilio Fossati | MF | 12 | 1 | 1910 | 1915 | | | | | | |
| **Davide Frattesi** | MF | 39 | 10 | 2022 | 2026 | | | | | 2022–23 (bronze) | |
| Giovanni Francini | DF | 8 | 0 | 1986 | 1990 | | | | | | |
| Angelo Franzosi | GK | 2 | 0 | 1947 | 1948 | | | | | | |
| Attilio Fresia | MF | 1 | 0 | 1913 | | | | | | | |
| Vincenzo Fresia | FW | 1 | 0 | 1913 | | | | | | | |
| Amleto Frignani | FW | 14 | 6 | 1952 | 1957 | | | | | | |
| Annibale Frossi | FW | 5 | 8 | 1936 | 1937 | | | | 1936 (gold) | | |
| Zeffiro Furiassi | DF | 2 | 0 | 1950 | 1950 | | | | | | |
| Giuseppe Furino | MF | 3 | 0 | 1970 | 1974 | 1970 (silver) | | | | | |
| Diego Fuser | MF | 25 | 3 | 1993 | 2000 | | | | | | |
| Luca Fusi | DF | 8 | 0 | 1988 | 1992 | | | | | | |
| Manolo Gabbiadini | FW | 13 | 2 | 2012 | 2022 | | | | | | |
| Guglielmo Gabetto | FW | 6 | 5 | 1942 | 1948 | | | | | | |
| Francesco Gabriotti | FW | 1 | 0 | 1936 | | | | | 1936 (gold) | | |
| **Roberto Gagliardini** | MF | 7 | 0 | 2017 | 2020 | | | | | | |
| Giuseppe Galderisi | FW | 10 | 0 | 1985 | 1986 | | | | | | |
| Roberto Galia | DF | 3 | 0 | 1992 | | | | | | | |
| Cesare Gallea | MF | 1 | 0 | 1937 | | | | | | | |
| Carlo Galletti | DF | 1 | 0 | 1913 | | | | | | | |
| Carlo Galli | FW | 13 | 5 | 1953 | 1959 | | | | | | |
| Giovanni Galli | GK | 19 | 0 | 1982 | 1986 | 1982 (gold) | | | | | |
| Giovanni Gallina | FW | 2 | 0 | 1914 | 1914 | | | | | | |
| Daniele Galloppa | MF | 2 | 0 | 2009 | 2009 | | | | | | |
| Alessandro Gamberini | DF | 8 | 0 | 2007 | 2011 | | | | | | |
| Giuseppe Gandini | MF | 6 | 0 | 1925 | 1928 | | | | | | |
| Bruno Garzena | DF | 1 | 0 | 1958 | | | | | | | |
| Felice Gasperi | DF | 6 | 0 | 1928 | 1933 | | | | 1928 (bronze) | | |
| Daniele Gastaldello | DF | 1 | 0 | 2011 | | | | | | | |
| **Federico Gatti** | DF | 8 | 0 | 2022 | 2026 | | | | | | |
| Gennaro Gattuso | MF | 73 | 1 | 2000 | 2010 | 2006 (gold) | | | | | |
| Rodolfo Gavinelli | FW | 1 | 0 | 1911 | | | | | | | |
| Renato Gei | FW | 1 | 0 | 1951 | | | | | | | |
| Pietro Genovesi | MF | 10 | 0 | 1921 | 1929 | | | | 1928 (bronze) | | |
| Mario Genta | MF | 2 | 0 | 1938 | 1939 | 1938 (gold) | | | | | |
| Claudio Gentile | DF | 71 | 1 | 1975 | 1984 | 1982 (gold) | | | | | |
| Giorgio Ghezzi | GK | 6 | 0 | 1954 | 1961 | | | | | | |
| Alcides Ghiggia | FW | 5 | 1 | 1957 | 1959 | | | | | | |
| Carlo Ghigliano | DF | 1 | 0 | 1920 | | | | | | | |
| Giovanni Giacomazzi | DF | 8 | 0 | 1954 | 1955 | | | | | | |
| Emanuele Giaccherini | MF | 29 | 4 | 2012 | 2016 | | 2012 (silver) | 2013 (bronze) | | | |
| Giuseppe Giaccone | GK | 4 | 0 | 1920 | | | | | | | |
| Mario Gianni | GK | 6 | 0 | 1927 | 1933 | | | | | | |
| Giuliano Giannichedda | MF | 3 | 0 | 1999 | | | | | | | |
| Giuseppe Giannini | MF | 47 | 6 | 1987 | 1991 | 1990 (bronze) | | | | | |
| Alberto Gilardino | FW | 57 | 19 | 2004 | 2013 | 2006 (gold) | | 2013 (bronze) | 2004 (bronze) | | |
| Aredio Gimona | MF | 3 | 3 | 1951 | 1952 | | | | | | |
| Alberto Giordani | MF | 1 | 0 | 1927 | | | | | | | |
| Bruno Giordano | FW | 13 | 1 | 1978 | 1985 | | | | | | |
| Attilio Giovannini | DF | 13 | 0 | 1949 | 1953 | | | | | | |
| Guglielmo Giovannini | DF | 2 | 0 | 1948 | 1948 | | | | | | |
| Sebastian Giovinco | FW | 23 | 1 | 2011 | 2015 | | 2012 (silver) | 2013 (bronze) | | | |
| Luigi Giuliano | MF | 1 | 0 | 1955 | | | | | | | |
| Federico Giunti | MF | 1 | 0 | 1996 | | | | | | | |
| Giuseppe Giustacchini | MF | 1 | 0 | 1921 | | | | | | | |
| **Wilfried Gnonto** | FW | 13 | 1 | 2022 | 2023 | | | | | 2022–23 (bronze) | |
| Massimo Gobbi | MF | 1 | 0 | 2006 | | | | | | | |
| Biagio Goggio | MF | 1 | 0 | 1914 | | | | | | | |
| **Pierluigi Gollini** | GK | 1 | 0 | 2019 | | | | | | | |
| Adolfo Gori | DF | 1 | 0 | 1967 | | | | | | | |
| Sergio Gori | FW | 3 | 0 | 1970 | | 1970 (silver) | | | | | |
| Giuseppe Grabbi | MF | 1 | 0 | 1924 | | | | | | | |
| Guido Gratton | MF | 11 | 3 | 1953 | 1959 | | | | | | |
| Francesco Graziani | FW | 64 | 23 | 1975 | 1983 | 1982 (gold) | | | | | |
| Giuseppe Grezar | MF | 8 | 1 | 1942 | 1948 | | | | | | |
| Luigi Griffanti | GK | 2 | 0 | 1942 | | | | | | | |
| **Vincenzo Grifo** | MF | 9 | 4 | 2018 | 2023 | | | | | | |
| Fabio Grosso | DF | 48 | 4 | 2003 | 2009 | 2006 (gold) | | | | | |
| Pietro Grosso | MF | 3 | 0 | 1951 | 1953 | | | | | | |
| Enrique Guaita | FW | 10 | 5 | 1934 | 1935 | 1934 (gold) | | | | | |
| Anfilogino Guarisi | FW | 6 | 1 | 1932 | 1934 | 1934 (gold) | | | | | |
| Egidio Guarnacci | MF | 3 | 0 | 1959 | 1960 | | | | | | |
| Aristide Guarneri | DF | 21 | 1 | 1963 | 1968 | | 1968 (gold) | | | | |
| Vincenzo Guerini | MF | 1 | 0 | 1974 | | | | | | | |
| Vincenzo Iaquinta | FW | 40 | 6 | 2005 | 2010 | 2006 (gold) | | | | | |
| Ciro Immobile | FW | 57 | 17 | 2014 | 2023 | | 2020 (gold) | | | 2022–23 (bronze) | |
| **Samuele Inacio** | FW | 1 | 0 | 2026 | | | | | | | |
| Giovanni Innocenti | GK | 5 | 0 | 1913 | 1914 | | | | | | |
| **Lorenzo Insigne** | FW | 54 | 10 | 2012 | 2022 | | 2020 (gold) | | | 2020–21 (bronze) | |
| Giovanni Invernizzi | MF | 1 | 0 | 1958 | | | | | | | |
| Filippo Inzaghi | FW | 57 | 25 | 1997 | 2007 | 2006 (gold) | 2000 (silver) | | | | |
| Simone Inzaghi | FW | 3 | 0 | 2000 | 2003 | | | | | | |
| Mark Iuliano | DF | 19 | 1 | 1998 | 2002 | | 2000 (silver) | | | | |
| **Armando Izzo** | DF | 3 | 0 | 2019 | | | | | | | |
| Francesco Janich | DF | 6 | 0 | 1962 | 1966 | | | | | | |
| Antonio Janni | MF | 23 | 1 | 1924 | 1929 | | | | 1928 (bronze) | | |
| **João Pedro** | FW | 1 | 0 | 2022 | | | | | | | |
| **Jorginho** | MF | 57 | 5 | 2016 | 2024 | | 2020 (gold) | | | 2020–21 (bronze); 2022–23 (bronze) | 2022 (silver) |
| Antonio Juliano | MF | 18 | 0 | 1966 | 1974 | 1970 (silver) | 1968 (gold) | | | | |
| **Michael Kayode** | DF | 5 | 1 | 2026 | | | | | | | |
| **Moise Kean** | FW | 28 | 13 | 2018 | 2026 | | | | | 2020–21 (bronze) | |
| **Luca Koleosho** | FW | 3 | 0 | 2026 | | | | | | | |
| Francesco La Rosa | FW | 2 | 0 | 1952 | | | | | | | |
| Pietro Lana | FW | 2 | 3 | 1910 | | | | | | | |
| Spartaco Landini | DF | 4 | 0 | 1966 | 1966 | | | | | | |
| Antonio Langella | FW | 3 | 0 | 2005 | 2005 | | | | | | |
| Marco Lanna | DF | 2 | 0 | 1992 | 1994 | | | | | | |
| **Kevin Lasagna** | FW | 7 | 0 | 2018 | 2020 | | | | | | |
| **Manuel Lazzari** | MF | 3 | 0 | 2018 | 2022 | | | | | | 2022 (silver) |
| Ettore Leale | MF | 2 | 0 | 1922 | 1924 | | | | | | |
| Cristian Daniel Ledesma | MF | 1 | 0 | 2010 | | | | | | | |
| Nicola Legrottaglie | DF | 16 | 1 | 2002 | 2009 | | | | | | |
| Gianluigi Lentini | FW | 13 | 0 | 1992 | 1996 | | | | | | |
| Gianfranco Leoncini | MF | 2 | 0 | 1966 | 1966 | | | | | | |
| Pietro Leone | MF | 9 | 0 | 1911 | 1914 | | | | | | |
| Virgilio Levratto | FW | 28 | 11 | 1924 | 1928 | | | | 1928 (bronze) | | |
| Julio Libonatti | FW | 17 | 15 | 1926 | 1932 | | | | | | |
| **Luca Lipani** | MF | 2 | 0 | 2026 | | | | | | | |
| Fabio Liverani | MF | 3 | 0 | 2001 | 2006 | | | | | | |
| **Manuel Locatelli** | MF | 36 | 3 | 2020 | 2026 | | 2020 (gold) | | | 2020–21 (bronze) | 2022 (silver) |
| Tomas Locatelli | MF | 2 | 0 | 1999 | 2000 | | | | | | |
| Ugo Locatelli | MF | 22 | 0 | 1936 | 1940 | 1938 (gold) | | | 1936 (gold) | | |
| Giovanni Lodetti | MF | 17 | 2 | 1964 | 1968 | | 1968 (gold) | | | | |
| Ezio Loik | MF | 9 | 4 | 1942 | 1949 | | | | | | |
| Francisco Lojacono | MF | 8 | 5 | 1959 | 1962 | | | | | | |
| Attilio Lombardo | MF | 19 | 3 | 1990 | 1997 | | | | | | |
| Angelo Longoni | MF | 1 | 2 | 1956 | | | | | | | |
| Benito Lorenzi | FW | 14 | 4 | 1949 | 1954 | | | | | | |
| Giacomo Losi | DF | 11 | 0 | 1960 | 1962 | | | | | | |
| Cesare Lovati | MF | 6 | 0 | 1920 | 1921 | | | | | | |
| Roberto Lovati | GK | 2 | 0 | 1957 | | | | | | | |
| Cristiano Lucarelli | FW | 6 | 3 | 2005 | 2007 | | | | | | |
| **Lorenzo Lucca** | FW | 5 | 0 | 2024 | 2025 | | | | | | |
| Arnaldo Lucentini | MF | 1 | 0 | 1951 | | | | | | | |
| Massimo Maccarone | FW | 2 | 0 | 2002 | 2002 | | | | | | |
| Tommaso Maestrelli | MF | 1 | 0 | 1948 | | | | | | | |
| Christian Maggio | DF | 34 | 0 | 2008 | 2014 | | 2012 (silver) | 2013 (bronze) | | | |
| Augusto Magli | MF | 1 | 0 | 1950 | | | | | | | |
| Ardico Magnini | DF | 20 | 0 | 1953 | 1957 | | | | | | |
| Mario Magnozzi | FW | 29 | 13 | 1924 | 1932 | | | | 1928 (bronze) | | |
| Giampiero Maini | MF | 1 | 0 | 1997 | | | | | | | |
| Saul Malatrasi | DF | 3 | 0 | 1965 | 1969 | | | | | | |
| Aldo Maldera | DF | 10 | 0 | 1976 | 1980 | | | | | | |
| Cesare Maldini | DF | 14 | 0 | 1960 | 1963 | | | | | | |
| **Daniel Maldini** | MF | 9 | 0 | 2024 | 2026 | | | | | | |
| Paolo Maldini | DF | 126 | 7 | 1988 | 2002 | 1990 (bronze); 1994 (silver) | 2000 (silver) | | | | |
| Ermando Malinverni | MF | 1 | 0 | 1947 | | | | | | | |
| **Gianluca Mancini** | DF | 22 | 2 | 2019 | 2026 | | | | | | |
| Roberto Mancini | FW | 36 | 4 | 1984 | 1994 | 1990 (bronze) | | | | | |
| **Rolando Mandragora** | MF | 1 | 0 | 2018 | | | | | | | |
| **Filippo Mané** | DF | 2 | 0 | 2026 | | | | | | | |
| Sergio Manente | DF | 1 | 0 | 1952 | | | | | | | |
| Lionello Manfredonia | DF | 4 | 0 | 1977 | 1978 | | | | | | |
| Antonio Manicone | MF | 1 | 0 | 1993 | | | | | | | |
| Moreno Mannini | DF | 10 | 0 | 1990 | 1993 | | | | | | |
| Luciano Marangon | DF | 1 | 0 | 1982 | | | | | | | |
| Massimo Marazzina | FW | 3 | 0 | 2002 | | | | | | | |
| Luca Marchegiani | GK | 9 | 0 | 1992 | 1996 | 1994 (silver) | | | | | |
| Rino Marchesi | MF | 2 | 0 | 1961 | 1962 | | | | | | |
| Federico Marchetti | GK | 11 | 0 | 2009 | 2013 | | | 2013 (bronze) | | | |
| Gianpietro Marchetti | DF | 5 | 0 | 1972 | 1973 | | | | | | |
| Sergio Marchi | DF | 1 | 0 | 1939 | | | | | | | |
| Libero Marchini | MF | 5 | 0 | 1936 | | | | | 1936 (gold) | | |
| Marco Marchionni | MF | 6 | 0 | 2003 | 2009 | | | | | | |
| Claudio Marchisio | MF | 55 | 5 | 2009 | 2017 | | 2012 (silver) | 2013 (bronze) | | | |
| Attilio Marcora | FW | 1 | 0 | 1921 | | | | | | | |
| Giacomo Mari | MF | 8 | 0 | 1948 | 1954 | | | | | | |
| Amos Mariani | FW | 4 | 2 | 1952 | 1959 | | | | | | |
| Edoardo Mariani | FW | 4 | 0 | 1919 | 1920 | | | | | | |
| Gianpiero Marini | MF | 20 | 0 | 1980 | 1983 | 1982 (gold) | | | | | |
| Giancarlo Marocchi | MF | 11 | 0 | 1988 | 1991 | 1990 (bronze) | | | | | |
| Domenico Marocchino | MF | 1 | 0 | 1981 | | | | | | | |
| Virgilio Maroso | DF | 7 | 1 | 1945 | 1949 | | | | | | |
| Cesare Martin | DF | 1 | 0 | 1923 | | | | | | | |
| Dario Martin | MF | 2 | 0 | 1927 | 1930 | | | | | | |
| Luigi Martini | DF | 1 | 0 | 1974 | | | | | | | |
| Rinaldo Martino | FW | 1 | 0 | 1949 | | | | | | | |
| Giustiniano Marucco | FW | 2 | 0 | 1920 | 1920 | | | | | | |
| Giuseppe Mascara | FW | 1 | 0 | 2009 | | | | | | | |
| Ernesto Mascheroni | DF | 2 | 0 | 1935 | | | | | | | |
| Humberto Maschio | MF | 2 | 0 | 1962 | | | | | | | |
| Guido Masetti | GK | 2 | 0 | 1934 | 1939 | 1934 (gold); 1938 (gold) | | | | | |
| Daniele Massaro | FW | 15 | 1 | 1982 | 1994 | 1982 (gold); 1994 (silver) | | | | | |
| Marco Materazzi | DF | 41 | 2 | 2001 | 2008 | 2006 (gold) | | | | | |
| Alessandro Matri | FW | 7 | 1 | 2011 | 2015 | | | | | | |
| Angelo Mattea | MF | 5 | 1 | 1914 | 1921 | | | | | | |
| Gianfranco Matteoli | MF | 6 | 0 | 1986 | 1987 | | | | | | |
| Carlo Mattrel | GK | 2 | 0 | 1962 | 1962 | | | | | | |
| Francesco Mattuteia | FW | 1 | 0 | 1924 | | | | | | | |
| Stefano Mauri | MF | 11 | 0 | 2004 | 2011 | | | | | | |
| Bruno Mazza | MF | 1 | 0 | 1953 | | | | | | | |
| **Pasquale Mazzocchi** | DF | 1 | 0 | 2022 | | | | | | | |
| Valentino Mazzola | MF | 12 | 4 | 1942 | 1949 | | | | | | |
| Sandro Mazzola | MF | 70 | 22 | 1963 | 1974 | 1970 (silver) | 1968 (gold) | | | | |
| Giuseppe Meazza | FW | 53 | 33 | 1930 | 1939 | 1934 (gold); 1938 (gold) | | | | | |
| Alessandro Melli | FW | 2 | 0 | 1991 | 1993 | | | | | | |
| Mario Meneghetti | MF | 4 | 0 | 1920 | | | | | | | |
| Enzo Menegotti | MF | 2 | 0 | 1955 | 1955 | | | | | | |
| Giampaolo Menichelli | FW | 9 | 1 | 1962 | 1964 | | | | | | |
| Romeo Menti | FW | 7 | 5 | 1947 | 1949 | | | | | | |
| **Alex Meret** | GK | 3 | 0 | 2019 | 2022 | | 2020 (gold) | | | 2020–21 (bronze); 2022–23 (bronze) | 2022 (silver) |
| Claudio Merlo | MF | 1 | 0 | 1969 | | | | | | | |
| Luigi Meroni | MF | 6 | 2 | 1966 | 1967 | | | | | | |
| Giandomenico Mesto | DF | 3 | 0 | 2005 | 2007 | | | | 2004 (bronze) | | |
| Fabrizio Miccoli | FW | 10 | 2 | 2003 | 2004 | | | | | | |
| Romano Micelli | DF | 1 | 0 | 1965 | | | | | | | |
| Enrico Migliavacca | MF | 11 | 3 | 1921 | 1923 | | | | | | |
| Marcello Mihalich | MF | 1 | 2 | 1929 | | | | | | | |
| Aurelio Milani | FW | 1 | 0 | 1964 | | | | | | | |
| Felice Milano | FW | 5 | 0 | 1912 | 1913 | | | | | | |
| Giuseppe Milano | MF | 11 | 0 | 1911 | 1914 | | | | | | |
| Lorenzo Minotti | DF | 8 | 0 | 1994 | 1995 | 1994 (silver) | | | | | |
| **Fabio Miretti** | MF | 1 | 0 | 2022 | | | | | | | |
| Cristian Molinaro | DF | 2 | 0 | 2010 | | | | | | | |
| Luigi Moltrasio | MF | 3 | 0 | 1954 | 1954 | | | | | | |
| Vincenzo Montella | FW | 20 | 3 | 1999 | 2005 | | 2000 (silver) | | | | |
| Mario Montesanto | MF | 2 | 0 | 1935 | 1936 | | | | | | |
| Feliciano Monti | FW | 3 | 0 | 1923 | 1924 | | | | | | |
| Luis Monti | MF | 18 | 1 | 1932 | 1936 | 1934 (gold) | | | | | |
| Antonio Montico | MF | 2 | 0 | 1955 | 1955 | | | | | | |
| Riccardo Montolivo | MF | 66 | 2 | 2007 | 2017 | | 2012 (silver) | 2013 (bronze) | | | |
| Miguel Montuori | MF | 12 | 2 | 1956 | 1960 | | | | | | |
| Eraldo Monzeglio | DF | 35 | 0 | 1930 | 1938 | 1934 (gold); 1938 (gold) | | | | | |
| Bruno Mora | FW | 21 | 4 | 1959 | 1965 | | | | | | |
| Clemente Morando | GK | 3 | 0 | 1921 | 1922 | | | | | | |
| Vittorio Morelli di Popolo | DF | 1 | 0 | 1912 | | | | | | | |
| Emiliano Moretti | DF | 2 | 0 | 2014 | 2015 | | | | 2004 (bronze) | | |
| Francesco Moriero | MF | 8 | 2 | 1998 | 2000 | | | | | | |
| Francesco Morini | DF | 11 | 0 | 1973 | 1975 | | | | | | |
| Giorgio Morini | MF | 3 | 0 | 1975 | 1975 | | | | | | |
| Giuseppe Moro | GK | 9 | 0 | 1949 | 1953 | | | | | | |
| Silvano Moro | DF | 1 | 0 | 1958 | | | | | | | |
| Giovanni Moscardini | FW | 9 | 7 | 1921 | 1925 | | | | | | |
| Eugenio Mosso | FW | 1 | 0 | 1914 | | | | | | | |
| Marco Motta | DF | 1 | 0 | 2010 | | | | | | | |
| Roberto Mozzini | DF | 6 | 0 | 1976 | 1977 | | | | | | |
| Ermes Muccinelli | FW | 15 | 4 | 1950 | 1957 | | | | | | |
| Federico Munerati | FW | 4 | 0 | 1926 | 1927 | | | | | | |
| Roberto Mussi | DF | 11 | 0 | 1993 | 1996 | 1994 (silver) | | | | | |
| Stelio Nardin | DF | 1 | 0 | 1967 | | | | | | | |
| **Cher Ndour** | MF | 2 | 0 | 2026 | | | | | | | |
| William Negri | GK | 12 | 0 | 1962 | 1965 | | | | | | |
| Alfonso Negro | FW | 1 | 1 | 1936 | | | | | 1936 (gold) | | |
| Paolo Negro | DF | 8 | 0 | 1994 | 2000 | | 2000 (silver) | | | | |
| Sebastiano Nela | DF | 5 | 0 | 1984 | 1987 | | | | | | |
| Bruno Neri | MF | 3 | 0 | 1936 | 1937 | | | | | | |
| Giacomo Neri | FW | 3 | 1 | 1939 | 1940 | | | | | | |
| Maino Neri | MF | 8 | 0 | 1948 | 1954 | | | | | | |
| Carlo Nervo | MF | 6 | 0 | 2002 | 2004 | | | | | | |
| Alessandro Nesta | DF | 78 | 0 | 1996 | 2006 | 2006 (gold) | 2000 (silver) | | | | |
| Fulvio Nesti | MF | 5 | 1 | 1953 | 1954 | | | | | | |
| Comunardo Niccolai | DF | 3 | 0 | 1970 | 1970 | 1970 (silver) | | | | | |
| Bruno Nicolè | FW | 8 | 2 | 1958 | 1964 | | | | | | |
| Cosimo Nocera | FW | 1 | 1 | 1965 | | | | | | | |
| Antonio Nocerino | MF | 15 | 0 | 2007 | 2012 | | 2012 (silver) | | | | |
| Walter Novellino | MF | 1 | 0 | 1978 | | | | | | | |
| Massimo Oddo | DF | 34 | 1 | 2002 | 2008 | 2006 (gold) | | | | | |
| **Angelo Ogbonna** | DF | 13 | 0 | 2011 | 2016 | | 2012 (silver) | | | | |
| Stefano Okaka | FW | 5 | 1 | 2014 | 2020 | | | | | | |
| Aldo Olivieri | GK | 24 | 0 | 1936 | 1940 | 1938 (gold) | | | | | |
| Renato Olmi | MF | 3 | 0 | 1940 | 1940 | 1938 (gold) | | | | | |
| Gabriele Oriali | MF | 28 | 1 | 1978 | 1983 | 1982 (gold) | | | | | |
| Andrea Orlandini | MF | 3 | 0 | 1974 | 1975 | | | | | | |
| Alberto Orlando | FW | 5 | 4 | 1962 | 1965 | | | | | | |
| Raimundo Orsi | FW | 35 | 13 | 1929 | 1935 | 1934 (gold) | | | | | |
| **Riccardo Orsolini** | MF | 13 | 2 | 2019 | 2025 | | | | | | |
| Alberto Orzan | DF | 4 | 0 | 1956 | 1957 | | | | | | |
| Dani Osvaldo | FW | 14 | 4 | 2011 | 2014 | | | | | | |
| Pasquale Padalino | DF | 1 | 0 | 1996 | | | | | | | |
| Michele Padovano | FW | 1 | 0 | 1997 | | | | | | | |
| **Simone Pafundi** | FW | 1 | 0 | 2022 | | | | | | | |
| Gianluca Pagliuca | GK | 39 | 0 | 1990 | 1998 | 1990 (bronze); 1994 (silver) | | | | | |
| Mario Pagotto | DF | 1 | 0 | 1940 | | | | | | | |
| **Marco Palestra** | DF | 3 | 0 | 2026 | | | | | | | |
| Gabriel Paletta | DF | 3 | 0 | 2014 | | | | | | | |
| Raffaele Palladino | FW | 3 | 0 | 2007 | 2009 | | | | | | |
| **Emerson Palmieri** | DF | 29 | 0 | 2018 | 2023 | | 2020 (gold) | | | 2020–21 (bronze) | 2022 (silver) |
| Angelo Palombo | MF | 22 | 0 | 2006 | 2011 | | | | 2004 (bronze) | | |
| Giuseppe Pancaro | DF | 19 | 0 | 1999 | 2005 | | | | | | |
| Egisto Pandolfini | MF | 21 | 9 | 1950 | 1957 | | | | | | |
| Christian Panucci | DF | 57 | 4 | 1994 | 2008 | | | | | | |
| Alessandro Parisi | DF | 1 | 0 | 2004 | | | | | | | |
| Giuseppe Parodi | MF | 4 | 0 | 1913 | 1920 | | | | | | |
| Carlo Parola | DF | 10 | 0 | 1945 | 1950 | | | | | | |
| Marco Parolo | MF | 34 | 0 | 2011 | 2018 | | | | | | |
| Piero Pasinati | FW | 11 | 5 | 1936 | 1938 | 1938 (gold) | | | | | |
| Ezio Pascutti | FW | 17 | 8 | 1958 | 1967 | | | | | | |
| Manuel Pasqual | DF | 11 | 0 | 2006 | 2015 | | | | | | |
| Leonardo Pavoletti | FW | 1 | 1 | 2019 | | | | | | | |
| Giampaolo Pazzini | FW | 25 | 4 | 2009 | 2012 | | | | | | |
| Eraldo Pecci | MF | 6 | 0 | 1975 | 1978 | | | | | | |
| Ivan Pelizzoli | GK | 2 | 0 | 2003 | 2004 | | | | 2004 (bronze) | | |
| Graziano Pellè | FW | 20 | 9 | 2014 | 2016 | | | | | | |
| **Pietro Pellegri** | FW | 1 | 0 | 2020 | | | | | | | |
| **Lorenzo Pellegrini** | MF | 36 | 6 | 2017 | 2024 | | | | | 2020–21 (bronze); 2022–23 (bronze) | 2022 (silver) |
| **Luca Pellegrini** | DF | 1 | 0 | 2020 | | | | | | | |
| Sergio Pellissier | FW | 1 | 1 | 2009 | | | | | | | |
| Federico Peluso | DF | 3 | 1 | 2012 | | | | | | | |
| Simone Pepe | MF | 23 | 0 | 2008 | 2011 | | | | | | |
| Marino Perani | FW | 4 | 1 | 1966 | | | | | | | |
| Mario Perazzolo | MF | 8 | 0 | 1936 | 1939 | 1938 (gold) | | | | | |
| Bernardo Perin | MF | 4 | 0 | 1921 | 1923 | | | | | | |
| **Mattia Perin** | GK | 2 | 0 | 2014 | 2018 | | | | | | |
| Francesco Pernigo | FW | 2 | 5 | 1948 | 1948 | | | | | | |
| Simone Perrotta | MF | 48 | 2 | 2002 | 2009 | 2006 (gold) | | | | | |
| Giuseppe Peruchetti | GK | 2 | 0 | 1936 | | | | | | | |
| Angelo Peruzzi | GK | 31 | 0 | 1992 | 2005 | 2006 (gold) | | | | | |
| Bruno Pesaola | FW | 1 | 0 | 1957 | | | | | | | |
| **Matteo Pessina** | MF | 16 | 5 | 2020 | 2023 | | 2020 (gold) | | | | 2022 (silver) |
| Gianluca Pessotto | DF | 22 | 0 | 1996 | 2002 | | 2000 (silver) | | | | |
| **Andrea Petagna** | FW | 1 | 0 | 2017 | | | | | | | |
| Gianfranco Petris | FW | 4 | 1 | 1958 | 1963 | | | | | | |
| Fabio Petruzzi | DF | 1 | 0 | 1995 | | | | | | | |
| Angelo Piccaluga | FW | 2 | 0 | 1929 | | | | | | | |
| Armando Picchi | DF | 12 | 0 | 1964 | 1968 | | | | | | |
| Achille Piccini | DF | 5 | 0 | 1936 | | | | | 1936 (gold) | | |
| Cristiano Piccini | DF | 3 | 0 | 2018 | 2019 | | | | | | |
| Alberto Piccinini | MF | 5 | 0 | 1949 | 1952 | | | | | | |
| **Roberto Piccoli** | FW | 1 | 0 | 2025 | | | | | | | |
| Alessandro Pierini | DF | 1 | 0 | 2001 | | | | | | | |
| Silvio Pietroboni | MF | 11 | 0 | 1927 | 1929 | | | | 1928 (bronze) | | |
| **Andrea Pinamonti** | FW | 1 | 0 | 2022 | | | | | | | |
| Giampiero Pinzi | MF | 1 | 0 | 2005 | | | | | 2004 (bronze) | | |
| Silvio Piola | FW | 34 | 30 | 1935 | 1952 | 1938 (gold) | | | | | |
| Andrea Pirlo | MF | 116 | 13 | 2002 | 2015 | 2006 (gold) | 2012 (silver) | 2013 (bronze) | 2004 (bronze) | | |
| Giovan Battista Pirovano | MF | 1 | 0 | 1966 | | | | | | | |
| **Niccolò Pisilli** | MF | 5 | 0 | 2024 | 2026 | | | | | | |
| Alfredo Pitto | MF | 29 | 2 | 1928 | 1935 | | | | 1928 (bronze) | | |
| Gino Pivatelli | FW | 7 | 2 | 1954 | 1958 | | | | | | |
| Pier Luigi Pizzaballa | GK | 1 | 0 | 1966 | | | | | | | |
| Mario Pizziolo | MF | 12 | 1 | 1933 | 1936 | 1934 (gold) | | | | | |
| **Tommaso Pobega** | MF | 3 | 0 | 2022 | | | | | | | |
| Fabrizio Poletti | DF | 6 | 0 | 1965 | 1970 | 1970 (silver) | | | | | |
| Andrea Poli | MF | 5 | 1 | 2012 | 2014 | | | | | | |
| **Matteo Politano** | FW | 20 | 4 | 2018 | 2026 | | | | | | 2022 (silver) |
| Sergio Porrini | DF | 2 | 0 | 1993 | | | | | | | |
| Roberto Porta | FW | 1 | 0 | 1935 | | | | | | | |
| Celso Posio | MF | 1 | 0 | 1957 | | | | | | | |
| Ugo Pozzan | MF | 2 | 0 | 1956 | | | | | | | |
| Alberto Pozzi | FW | 3 | 0 | 1922 | 1924 | | | | | | |
| Pierino Prati | FW | 14 | 7 | 1968 | 1974 | 1970 (silver) | 1968 (gold) | | | | |
| Cesare Presca | MF | 1 | 0 | 1948 | | | | | | | |
| Maurilio Prini | FW | 3 | 0 | 1956 | 1957 | | | | | | |
| Roberto Pruzzo | FW | 6 | 0 | 1978 | 1982 | | | | | | |
| Giorgio Puia | DF | 7 | 0 | 1962 | 1970 | 1970 (silver) | | | | | |
| Paolo Pulici | FW | 19 | 5 | 1973 | 1978 | | | | | | |
| Ettore Puricelli | FW | 1 | 1 | 1939 | | | | | | | |
| Fabio Quagliarella | FW | 28 | 9 | 2007 | 2019 | | | | | | |
| Luigi Radice | DF | 5 | 0 | 1961 | 1963 | | | | | | |
| Roberto Rambaudi | MF | 2 | 0 | 1994 | | | | | | | |
| Alessandro Rampini | FW | 1 | 0 | 1920 | | | | | | | |
| Carlo Rampini | MF | 8 | 3 | 1911 | 1913 | | | | | | |
| **Luca Ranieri** | DF | 1 | 0 | 2025 | | | | | | | |
| Andrea Ranocchia | DF | 21 | 0 | 2010 | 2016 | | | | | | |
| **Giacomo Raspadori** | FW | 47 | 11 | 2021 | 2026 | | 2020 (gold) | | | 2020–21 (bronze); 2022–23 (bronze) | 2022 (silver) |
| Pietro Rava | DF | 30 | 0 | 1935 | 1946 | 1938 (gold) | | | 1936 (gold) | | |
| Fabrizio Ravanelli | FW | 22 | 8 | 1995 | 1998 | | | | | | |
| Luciano Re Cecconi | MF | 2 | 0 | 1974 | | | | | | | |
| **Luca Reggiani** | DF | 1 | 0 | 2026 | | | | | | | |
| Carlo Reguzzoni | FW | 1 | 0 | 1940 | | | | | | | |
| Leandro Remondini | MF | 1 | 0 | 1950 | | | | | | | |
| **Mateo Retegui** | FW | 27 | 11 | 2023 | 2026 | | | | | 2022–23 (bronze) | |
| Ettore Reynaudi | MF | 6 | 0 | 1920 | 1921 | | | | | | |
| Eduardo Ricagni | MF | 3 | 2 | 1953 | 1955 | | | | | | |
| **Samuele Ricci** | MF | 12 | 0 | 2022 | 2026 | | | | | | |
| Secondo Ricci | DF | 1 | 0 | 1940 | | | | | | | |
| Mario Rigamonti | MF | 3 | 0 | 1947 | 1949 | | | | | | |
| Ubaldo Righetti | DF | 8 | 0 | 1983 | 1985 | | | | | | |
| Gigi Riva | FW | 42 | 35 | 1965 | 1974 | 1970 (silver) | 1968 (gold) | | | | |
| Gianni Rivera | MF | 60 | 14 | 1962 | 1974 | 1970 (silver) | 1968 (gold) | | | | |
| Enrico Rivolta | MF | 8 | 1 | 1928 | 1929 | | | | 1928 (bronze) | | |
| Giuseppe Rizzi | MF | 4 | 2 | 1910 | 1913 | | | | | | |
| Ruggiero Rizzitelli | FW | 9 | 2 | 1988 | 1991 | | | | | | |
| Francesco Rizzo | MF | 2 | 2 | 1966 | 1966 | | | | | | |
| Enzo Robotti | DF | 15 | 0 | 1958 | 1965 | | | | | | |
| Francesco Rocca | DF | 18 | 1 | 1974 | 1976 | | | | | | |
| Tommaso Rocchi | FW | 3 | 0 | 2006 | 2007 | | | | | | |
| Nereo Rocco | MF | 1 | 0 | 1934 | | | | | | | |
| Rinaldo Roggero | FW | 1 | 0 | 1920 | | | | | | | |
| Moreno Roggi | DF | 7 | 0 | 1973 | 1976 | | | | | | |
| Flavio Roma | GK | 3 | 0 | 2005 | | | | | | | |
| **Alessio Romagnoli** | DF | 13 | 2 | 2016 | 2023 | | | | | | |
| **Alessandro Romano** | MF | 3 | 0 | 2026 | | | | | | | |
| Félix Romano | MF | 5 | 0 | 1921 | 1924 | | | | | | |
| Pierluigi Ronzon | MF | 1 | 0 | 1960 | | | | | | | |
| Roberto Rosato | DF | 37 | 0 | 1965 | 1973 | 1970 (silver) | 1968 (gold) | | | | |
| Francesco Rosetta | DF | 7 | 0 | 1949 | 1956 | | | | | | |
| Virginio Rosetta | DF | 52 | 0 | 1920 | 1934 | 1934 (gold) | | | 1928 (bronze) | | |
| Alessandro Rosina | MF | 1 | 0 | 2007 | | | | | | | |
| Gino Rossetti | FW | 13 | 9 | 1927 | 1929 | | | | 1928 (bronze) | | |
| Giuseppe Rossi | FW | 30 | 7 | 2008 | 2014 | | | | | | |
| Paolo Rossi | FW | 48 | 20 | 1977 | 1986 | 1982 (gold) | | | | | |
| Fabio Rossitto | MF | 1 | 0 | 1996 | | | | | | | |
| Severino Rosso | MF | 1 | 0 | 1924 | | | | | | | |
| Battista Rota | DF | 2 | 0 | 1952 | 1952 | | | | | | |
| **Nicolò Rovella** | MF | 4 | 0 | 2024 | 2025 | | | | | | |
| Tazio Roversi | DF | 1 | 0 | 1971 | | | | | | | |
| **Daniele Rugani** | DF | 7 | 0 | 2016 | 2018 | | | | | | |
| **Matteo Ruggeri** | DF | 2 | 0 | 2026 | | | | | | | |
| Gennaro Ruotolo | MF | 1 | 0 | 1991 | | | | | | | |
| Giuseppe Sabadini | DF | 4 | 0 | 1973 | 1974 | | | | | | |
| Antonio Sabato | MF | 4 | 0 | 1984 | | | | | | | |
| Claudio Sala | MF | 18 | 0 | 1971 | 1978 | | | | | | |
| Marco Sala | DF | 1 | 0 | 1912 | | | | | | | |
| Patrizio Sala | MF | 8 | 0 | 1976 | 1980 | | | | | | |
| Attila Sallustro | FW | 2 | 1 | 1929 | 1933 | | | | | | |
| Sandro Salvadore | MF | 36 | 0 | 1960 | 1970 | | 1968 (gold) | | | | |
| **Nicola Sansone** | FW | 3 | 0 | 2015 | 2016 | | | | | | |
| Raffaele Sansone | MF | 3 | 0 | 1932 | 1939 | | | | | | |
| Aristodemo Santamaria | FW | 11 | 3 | 1915 | 1923 | | | | | | |
| Sergio Santarini | DF | 2 | 1 | 1971 | 1974 | | | | | | |
| Davide Santon | DF | 8 | 0 | 2009 | 2013 | | | | | | |
| Vittorio Sardelli | DF | 1 | 0 | 1939 | | | | | | | |
| Enrico Sardi | FW | 7 | 4 | 1912 | 1920 | | | | | | |
| Benito Sarti | DF | 6 | 0 | 1958 | 1961 | | | | | | |
| Giuliano Sarti | GK | 8 | 0 | 1959 | 1967 | | | | | | |
| Luigi Sartor | DF | 2 | 0 | 1997 | 2002 | | | | | | |
| Marco Sau | FW | 1 | 0 | 2013 | | | | | | | |
| Giuseppe Savoldi | FW | 4 | 1 | 1975 | 1975 | | | | | | |
| **Giorgio Scalvini** | DF | 13 | 0 | 2022 | 2026 | | | | | | |
| **Gianluca Scamacca** | FW | 26 | 2 | 2021 | 2026 | | | | | | 2022 (silver) |
| Luigi Scarabello | MF | 2 | 0 | 1936 | 1939 | | | | 1936 (gold) | | |
| **Ezequiel Schelotto** | MF | 1 | 0 | 2012 | | | | | | | |
| Juan Alberto Schiaffino | MF | 4 | 0 | 1954 | 1958 | | | | | | |
| Angelo Schiavio | FW | 21 | 15 | 1925 | 1934 | 1934 (gold) | | | 1928 (bronze) | | |
| Salvatore Schillaci | FW | 16 | 7 | 1990 | 1991 | 1990 (bronze) | | | | | |
| Gaetano Scirea | DF | 78 | 2 | 1975 | 1986 | 1982 (gold) | | | | | |
| Ezio Sclavi | GK | 2 | 0 | 1932 | | | | | | | |
| Alejandro Scopelli | FW | 1 | 0 | 1935 | | | | | | | |
| Armando Segato | MF | 20 | 0 | 1953 | 1959 | | | | | | |
| Franco Selvaggi | FW | 3 | 0 | 1981 | 1982 | 1982 (gold) | | | | | |
| Franco Semioli | MF | 3 | 0 | 2006 | 2007 | | | | | | |
| **Stefano Sensi** | MF | 9 | 3 | 2018 | 2022 | | | | | | |
| Lucidio Sentimenti | GK | 9 | 0 | 1945 | 1953 | | | | | | |
| Pietro Serantoni | MF | 17 | 4 | 1933 | 1939 | 1938 (gold) | | | | | |
| Aldo Serena | FW | 23 | 5 | 1984 | 1990 | 1990 (bronze) | | | | | |
| Michele Serena | DF | 1 | 0 | 1998 | | | | | | | |
| Abdon Sgarbi | MF | 1 | 0 | 1929 | | | | | | | |
| Giuseppe Signori | FW | 28 | 7 | 1992 | 1995 | 1994 (silver) | | | | | |
| Andrea Silenzi | FW | 1 | 0 | 1994 | | | | | | | |
| Arturo Silvestri | DF | 3 | 0 | 1951 | 1951 | | | | | | |
| Marco Simone | FW | 4 | 0 | 1992 | 1996 | | | | | | |
| **Salvatore Sirigu** | GK | 28 | 0 | 2010 | 2021 | | 2012 (silver); 2020 (gold) | 2013 (bronze) | | 2020–21 (bronze) | |
| Omar Sívori | FW | 9 | 8 | 1961 | 1962 | | | | | | |
| **Roberto Soriano** | MF | 9 | 0 | 2014 | 2020 | | | | | | |
| Angelo Benedicto Sormani | FW | 7 | 2 | 1961 | 1962 | | | | | | |
| Mario Sperone | MF | 2 | 0 | 1927 | | | | | | | |
| **Leonardo Spinazzola** | DF | 27 | 0 | 2017 | 2026 | | 2020 (gold) | | | 2022–23 (bronze) | 2022 (silver) |
| Luciano Spinosi | DF | 19 | 0 | 1971 | 1974 | | | | | | |
| Gino Stacchini | FW | 6 | 3 | 1958 | 1961 | | | | | | |
| Francesco Statuto | MF | 3 | 0 | 1995 | 1995 | | | | | | |
| Adone Stellin | DF | 2 | 1 | 1948 | | | | | | | |
| Giovanni Stroppa | MF | 4 | 0 | 1993 | 1994 | | | | | | |
| Stefano Sturaro | MF | 4 | 0 | 2016 | | | | | | | |
| Alessio Tacchinardi | MF | 13 | 0 | 1995 | 2003 | | | | | | |
| Stefano Tacconi | GK | 7 | 0 | 1987 | 1991 | 1990 (bronze) | | | | | |
| Franco Tancredi | GK | 12 | 0 | 1984 | 1986 | | | | | | |
| Mariano Tansini | FW | 2 | 0 | 1926 | 1926 | | | | | | |
| Marco Tardelli | MF | 81 | 6 | 1976 | 1985 | 1982 (gold) | | | | | |
| Mauro Tassotti | DF | 7 | 0 | 1992 | 1994 | 1994 (silver) | | | | | |
| Christian Terlizzi | DF | 1 | 0 | 2006 | | | | | | | |
| Thiago Motta | MF | 30 | 1 | 2011 | 2016 | | 2012 (silver) | | | | |
| Giuseppe Ticozzelli | DF | 1 | 0 | 1920 | | | | | | | |
| Omero Tognon | MF | 14 | 0 | 1949 | 1954 | | | | | | |
| Francesco Toldo | GK | 28 | 0 | 1995 | 2004 | | 2000 (silver) | | | | |
| **Rafael Tolói** | DF | 14 | 0 | 2021 | 2023 | | 2020 (gold) | | | 2022–23 (bronze) | |
| Damiano Tommasi | MF | 25 | 1 | 1998 | 2003 | | | | | | |
| **Sandro Tonali** | MF | 38 | 4 | 2019 | 2026 | | | | | | |
| Max Tonetto | MF | 1 | 0 | 2007 | | | | | | | |
| Luca Toni | FW | 47 | 16 | 2004 | 2009 | 2006 (gold) | | | | | |
| Moreno Torricelli | DF | 10 | 0 | 1996 | 1999 | | | | | | |
| Stefano Torrisi | DF | 1 | 0 | 1997 | | | | | | | |
| Mario Tortul | MF | 1 | 0 | 1956 | | | | | | | |
| Francesco Totti | FW | 58 | 9 | 1998 | 2006 | 2006 (gold) | 2000 (silver) | | | | |
| Giovanni Trapattoni | MF | 17 | 1 | 1960 | 1964 | | | | | | |
| Mario Trebbi | DF | 2 | 0 | 1961 | 1963 | | | | | | |
| Attilio Trerè | MF | 5 | 0 | 1910 | 1914 | | | | | | |
| Guglielmo Trevisan | MF | 2 | 1 | 1940 | 1940 | | | | | | |
| Roberto Tricella | DF | 11 | 0 | 1984 | 1987 | | | | | | |
| Giuseppe Trivellini | GK | 7 | 0 | 1914 | 1923 | | | | | | |
| Paride Tumburus | DF | 4 | 0 | 1962 | 1963 | | | | | | |
| Angelo Turconi | MF | 2 | 1 | 1948 | 1948 | | | | | | |
| **Destiny Udogie** | DF | 12 | 0 | 2023 | 2025 | | | | | | |
| Mirko Valdifiori | MF | 1 | 0 | 2015 | | | | | | | |
| Modesto Valle | DF | 7 | 0 | 1912 | 1914 | | | | | | |
| Attilio Valobra | MF | 1 | 0 | 1913 | | | | | | | |
| Paolo Vanoli | DF | 2 | 1 | 1999 | 2000 | | | | | | |
| Amedeo Varese | MF | 5 | 0 | 1913 | 1914 | | | | | | |
| Giovanni Varglien | MF | 3 | 0 | 1936 | 1939 | | | | | | |
| Mario Varglien | MF | 1 | 0 | 1935 | | 1934 (gold) | | | | | |
| Franco Varisco | DF | 2 | 0 | 1910 | 1910 | | | | | | |
| Giuseppe Vavassori | GK | 1 | 0 | 1961 | | | | | | | |
| **Franco Vázquez** | MF | 2 | 0 | 2015 | | | | | | | |
| Giovanni Vecchina | FW | 2 | 0 | 1928 | 1931 | | | | | | |
| Arcadio Venturi | MF | 6 | 1 | 1951 | 1953 | | | | | | |
| Giorgio Venturin | MF | 1 | 0 | 1992 | | | | | | | |
| Bruno Venturini | GK | 4 | 0 | 1936 | 1936 | | | | 1936 (gold) | | |
| Luigi Vercelli | DF | 1 | 0 | 1921 | | | | | | | |
| **Simone Verdi** | FW | 4 | 0 | 2017 | 2018 | | | | | | |
| **Antonio Vergara** | FW | 4 | 0 | 2026 | | | | | | | |
| **Marco Verratti** | MF | 55 | 3 | 2012 | 2023 | | 2020 (gold) | | | 2020–21 (bronze); 2022–23 (bronze) | |
| Gianluca Vialli | FW | 59 | 16 | 1985 | 1992 | 1990 (bronze) | | | | | |
| **Guglielmo Vicario** | GK | 5 | 0 | 2024 | 2025 | | | | | | |
| Pietro Vierchowod | DF | 45 | 2 | 1981 | 1993 | 1982 (gold); 1990 (bronze) | | | | | |
| Christian Vieri | FW | 49 | 23 | 1997 | 2005 | | | | | | |
| Lido Vieri | GK | 4 | 0 | 1963 | 1968 | 1970 (silver) | 1968 (gold) | | | | |
| Giovanni Vincenzi | DF | 1 | 0 | 1924 | | | | | | | |
| Guido Vincenzi | DF | 3 | 0 | 1954 | 1958 | | | | | | |
| Giovanni Viola | GK | 11 | 0 | 1954 | 1956 | | | | | | |
| Giuseppe Virgili | FW | 7 | 2 | 1955 | 1957 | | | | | | |
| Emiliano Viviano | GK | 6 | 0 | 2010 | 2011 | | | | | | |
| Pasquale Vivolo | FW | 4 | 1 | 1952 | 1953 | | | | | | |
| Antonio Vojak | MF | 1 | 0 | 1932 | | | | | | | |
| Sergio Volpi | MF | 2 | 0 | 2004 | 2006 | | | | | | |
| Giuseppe Wilson | DF | 3 | 0 | 1972 | 1974 | | | | | | |
| **Mattia Zaccagni** | FW | 13 | 1 | 2022 | 2025 | | | | | | |
| Cristian Zaccardo | DF | 17 | 1 | 2004 | 2007 | 2006 (gold) | | | | | |
| Renato Zaccarelli | MF | 25 | 2 | 1975 | 1980 | | | | | | |
| Franco Zaglio | MF | 2 | 0 | 1959 | 1959 | | | | | | |
| Gianluca Zambrotta | DF | 98 | 2 | 1999 | 2010 | 2006 (gold) | 2000 (silver) | | | | |
| Mario Zanello | DF | 2 | 0 | 1927 | | | | | | | |
| Cristiano Zanetti | DF | 17 | 1 | 2001 | 2004 | | | | | | |
| **Nicolò Zaniolo** | MF | 18 | 2 | 2019 | 2024 | | | | | 2022–23 (bronze) | |
| **Davide Zappacosta** | DF | 14 | 0 | 2016 | 2025 | | | | | | |
| Luciano Zauri | DF | 5 | 0 | 2001 | 2002 | | | | | | |
| Simone Zaza | FW | 18 | 2 | 2014 | 2018 | | | | | | |
| Luciano Zecchini | DF | 3 | 0 | 1974 | | | | | | | |
| Walter Zenga | GK | 58 | 0 | 1986 | 1992 | 1990 (bronze) | | | | | |
| Cristian Zenoni | DF | 2 | 0 | 2001 | 2006 | | | | | | |
| Damiano Zenoni | MF | 1 | 0 | 2000 | | | | | | | |
| **Alessio Zerbin** | FW | 1 | 0 | 2022 | | | | | | | |
| Gianfranco Zigoni | MF | 1 | 0 | 1967 | | | | | | | |
| Dino Zoff | GK | 112 | 0 | 1968 | 1983 | 1970 (silver); 1982 (gold) | 1968 (gold) | | | | |
| Gianfranco Zola | FW | 35 | 10 | 1991 | 1997 | 1994 (silver) | | | | | |
| **Mohamed Alì Zoma** | FW | 1 | 0 | 2026 | | | | | | | |
| Daniele Zoratto | MF | 1 | 0 | 1993 | | | | | | | |
| Enea Zuffi | FW | 2 | 0 | 1912 | | | | | | | |
