= 1929–30 Alessandria US season =

Alessandria U.S.
1929–30 season
- Chairman: Ladislao Rocca
- Head Coach: Carlo Carcano
- Stadium: Campo del Littorio, Alessandria
- Serie A: 6th
- Top goalscorer: Giovanni Ferrari (18)
Home colours

The 1929–30 season of Alessandria Unione Sportiva's was their 14th in Italian football and their 13th in the top level of Italian championship, which in this season settled in a simple 18-teams tournament named Serie A.

The team of the 1928-29 season was almost entirely confirmed, except for the loss of Elvio Banchero, which signed for Genova 1893. The team played for the first time at the Campo del Littorio.

After the first seventeen rounds, the Grigi's held a high-levels table position; from April to June, they met 7 defeats in 8 matches, and lost touch with the first positions, occupied by Ambrosiana and Genova 1893; they finished in sixth place. So far, it is the highest result reached by Alessandria in Serie A since its foundation (both with 1931-32).

In his last season with Alessandria U.S., Giovanni Ferrari scored 18 goals.

== Club ==
Management

- Honorary Chairman: Felice Bensa
- Chairman: Ladislao Rocca
- Consulors: A. Canestri, I. De Giorgis, G. De Negri, C. Isaia, A. Massobrio, G. Nascimbene, Giovanni Ronza
- Secretary: Ugo Benzi

Coaching staff

- Coach: Carlo Carcano

== Players ==
=== Transfers ===
==== In ====
—	GK	Kingdom of Italy	Giuseppe Rapetti (from Roma)
—	DF	Kingdom of Italy	Luigi Gallino (from Casale)
—	FW	Kingdom of Italy	Umberto Alessio (from Casale)
—	FW	Kingdom of Italy	Ettore Banchero (II) (from youth team)
—	FW	Kingdom of Italy	Settimo Gastaldi (from youth team)
—	FW	Kingdom of Italy	Cinzio Scagliotti (from youth team)

==== Out ====
—	GK	Kingdom of Italy	Clemente Morando (to Messina)
—	DF	Kingdom of Italy	Ugo Rasetto (to La Dominante)
—	MF	Kingdom of Italy	Aurelio Fineschi (to Genova 1893)
—	FW	Kingdom of Italy	Elvio Banchero (I) (to Genova 1893)
—	FW	Kingdom of Italy	Arnaldo Luigi Nebbia (I) (to Atalanta)

=== Profiles and statistics ===
Role	Player	Born	Apps	Goals	Apps	Goals
Role	Player	Born	Serie A		Total	
FW	(Italy) Umberto Alessio		4	1	4	1
FW	(Italy) Mario Autelli	1905	8	1	8	1
FW	(Italy) Edoardo Avalle	1905	33	9	33	9
MF	(Italy) Amilcare Baghino	1912	1	0	1	0
GK	(Italy) Natale Balossino	1904	28	-43	28	-43
FW	(Italy) Ettore Banchero (II)	1907	4	1	4	1
MF	(Italy) Luigi Bertolini	1904	30	0	30	0
MF	(Italy) Michele Borelli	1909	10	2	10	2
FW	(Italy) Renato Cattaneo	1903	33	9	33	9
FW	(Italy) Carlo Chierico	1907	21	2	21	2
DF	(Italy) Felice Costa	1899	32	0	32	0
FW	(Italy) Giovanni Ferrari	1907	26	18	26	18
DF	(Italy) Luigi Gallino	1901	33	0	33	0
MF	(Italy) Giuseppe Gandini	1900	24	0	24	0
FW	(Italy) Settimo Gastaldi	1910	11	2	11	2
DF	(Italy) Armando Lauro	1900	32	1	32	1
DF	(Italy) Giuseppe Mantelli		1	0	1	0
MF	(Italy) Libero Marchina	1907	24	2	24	2
GK	(Italy) Giuseppe Rapetti	1905	6	-6	6	-6
FW	(Italy) Cinzio Scagliotti	1911	14	4	14	4

== Matches ==
=== Serie A ===
6 October 1929 1	Alessandria	3–1	Roma	Alessandria
	Alessio 8'; Avalle 53'; Ferrari 75'		39' Volk	Stadium: Campo del Littorio; Referee: Rovida (Milan)

13 October 1929 2	Alessandria	0–0	Pro Patria	Alessandria
				Stadium: Campo del Littorio; Referee: Mastellari (Bologna)

20 October 1929 3	Lazio	0–0	Alessandria	Rome
				Stadium: Stadio della Rondinella; Referee: Dani (Genoa)

27 October 1929 4	Padova	1–3	Alessandria	Padua
	Lamon 42'		16' Autelli; 17' Ferrari; 28' Cattaneo	Stadium: Stadio Silvio Appiani; Referee: Garbieri (Genoa)

3 November 1929 5	Alessandria	3–3	Torino	Alessandria
	Ferrari 8', 66', 68'		20' Baloncieri; 42' Janni; 52' Libonatti	Stadium: Campo del Littorio; Referee: Lenti (Genoa)

10 November 1929 6	Alessandria	1–0	Juventus	Alessandria
	Caligaris 88' (o.g.)			Stadium: Campo del Littorio; Referee: Caironi (Milan)

17 November 1929 7	Genova 1893	1–0	Alessandria	Genoa
	Casanova II 25'; Notti 76'		30' (o.g.) Lombardo	Stadium: Stadio Marassi; Referee: Barlassina (Novara)

24 November 1929 8	Alessandria	4–0	Brescia	Alessandria
	Avalle 51'; Cattaneo 74'; Ferrari 77', 89'			Stadium: Campo del Littorio; Referee: Ciamberlini (Sampierdarena)

8 December 1929 9	Pro Vercelli	2–2	Alessandria	Vercelli
	Gatti 18'; Casalino 67'		17' Ferrari; 25' Chierico	Stadium: Foro Boario; Referee: Rovida (Milan)

15 December 1929 10	Alessandria	1–2	Ambrosiana	Alessandria
	Ferrari 25'		20' Serantoni; 54' Conti	Stadium: Campo del Littorio; Referee: Barlassina (Novara)

22 December 1929 11	Milan	0–1	Alessandria	Milan
			41' Cattaneo	Stadium: Stadio San Siro; Referee: Dani (Genoa)

5 January 1930 12	Bologna	1–2	Alessandria	Bologna
	Maini 44'		54' Borelli; 77' Marina	Stadium: Stadio Littoriale; Referee: Lenti (Genoa)

12 January 1930 13	Alessandria	4–1	Triestina	Alessandria
	Avalle 27', 28' (pen.); Gastaldi 48'; Ferrari 76'		8' (pen.) Castellani	Stadium: Campo del Littorio; Referee: Caironi (Milan)

19 January 1930 14	Livorno	2–1	Alessandria	Livorno
	Magnozzi 65', 79'		8' Ferrari	Stadium: Campo Villa Chayes; Referee: Pessato (Monfalcone)

2 February 1930 16	Modena	0–1	Alessandria	Modena
			Setti 8' (o.g.)	Stadium: Ex Velodromo; Referee: Barlassina (Novara)

16 February 1930 17	Alessandria	3–0	Cremonese	Alessandria
	Lauro 12'; Ferrari 40', 47'			Stadium: Campo del Littorio; Referee: Malagodi (Milan)

23 February 1930 18	Roma	1–1	Alessandria	Rome
	Volk 21'		72' Borelli	Stadium: Campo Testaccio; Referee: Gama (Genoa)

9 March 1930 19	Pro Patria	4–0	Alessandria	Busto Arsizio
	Vigna 49'; Bonivento 58', 74', 83'			Stadium: Stadium; Referee: Turbiani (Ferrara)

16 March 1930 20	Alessandria	4–2	Lazio	Alessandria
	Ferrari 16'; Chierico 21'; Cattaneo 30', 71'		47' Spivach; 72' Ziroli	Stadium: Campo del Littorio; Referee: Guarnieri (Milan)

19 March 1930 15 (P)	Alessandria	2–1	Napoli	Alessandria
	Vincenzi 35' (o.g.); Avalle 46'		15' Sallustro I	Stadium: Campo del Littorio; Referee: Giorgi (Gallarate)

23 March 1930 21	Alessandria	4–2	Padova	Alessandria
	Avalle 18', 25', 87'; Scagliotti 82'		10' Vecchina; 88' (pen.) Bedendo	Stadium: Campo del Littorio; Referee: Malagodi (Milan)

30 March 1930 22	Torino	2–2	Alessandria	Turin
	Imberti 40', 90'		31' Cattaneo; 64' Ferrari	Stadium: Stadio Filadelfia; Referee: Giorgi (Gallarate)

13 April 1930 23	Juventus	2–1	Alessandria	Turin
	Balossino 25' (o.g.); Orsi 83'		40' Cattaneo	Stadium: Stadio di Corso Marsiglia; Referee: Dani (Genoa)

20 April 1930 24	Alessandria	0–2	Genoa	Alessandria
			58' Banchero I 76' Casanova II	Stadium: Campo del Littorio; Referee: Carraro (Padua)

27 April 1930 25	Brescia	2–1	Alessandria	Brescia
	Scaltriti 12'; Maffioli 40'		35' Banchero II	Stadium: Stadium; Referee: Rovida (Milan)

4 May 1930 26	Alessandria	0–2	Pro Vercelli	Alessandria
			2' Seccatore; 37' Casalino	Stadium: Campo del Littorio; Referee: Turbiani (Ferrara)

18 May 1930 27	Ambrosiana	2–0	Alessandria	Milan
	Serantoni 53', 64'			Stadium: Campo Virgilio Fossati; Referee: Bruna (Venice)

25 May 1930 28	Alessandria	2–1	Milan	Alessandria
	Cattaneo 72'; Ferrari 86'		70' Rossi	Stadium: Campo del Littorio; Referee: Turbiani (Ferrara)

29 May 1930 29	Alessandria	2–3	Bologna	Alessandria
	Ferrari 1'; Avalle 49'		19', 70' Maini; 74' Busini III	Stadium: Campo del Littorio; Referee: Caironi (Milan)

1 June 1930 30	Triestina	1–0	Alessandria	Udine
	Ostromann 73'			Stadium: Stadio Moretti; Referee: Bonello (Venice)

8 June 1930 31	Alessandria	3–2	Livorno	Alessandria
	Cattaneo 6'; Marina 25'; Scagliotti 52'		74' Magnozzi; 79' Corsetti	Stadium: Campo del Littorio; Referee: Bruna (Venice)

15 June 1930 32	Napoli	3–1	Alessandria	Naples
	Ghisi I 34'; Sallustro I 84'; Vojak I 86'		37' Scagliotti	Stadium: Stadio Giorgio Ascarelli; Referee: Gama (Milan)

19 June 1930 34 (A)	Cremonese	1–1	Alessandria	Cremona
	Serdoz 81'		69' Gastaldi	Stadium: Stadio Giovanni Zini; Referee: Garbieri (Genoa)

29 June 1930 33	Alessandria	1–1	Modena	Alessandria
	Scagliotti 45'		5' Piccaluga	Stadium: Campo del Littorio; Referee: Casetta (Milan)

== Statistics ==
=== Results by round ===
Round	1	2	3	4	5	6	7	8	9	10	11	12	13	14	15	16	17	18	19	20	21	22	23	24	25	26	27	28	29	30	31	32	33	34
Ground	H	H	A	A	H	H	A	H	A	H	A	A	H	A	H	A	H	A	A	H	H	A	A	H	A	H	A	H	H	A	H	A	H	A
Result	W	D	D	W	D	W	L	W	D	L	W	W	W	L	W	W	W	D	L	W	W	D	L	L	L	L	L	W	L	L	W	L	D	D
Position	1	4	4	3	2	1	4	3	3	4	3	3	3	4	4	2	2	3	4	3	3	3	4	5	5	5	5	5	5	5	5	6	5	6

Source: Standings
A = Away; H = Home; W = Win; D = Draw; L = Loss

=== Results summary ===
Overall								Home						Away					
Pld	W	D	L	GF	GA	GD	Pts	W	D	L	GF	GA	GD	W	D	L	GF	GA	GD
34	14	8	12	55	49	+6	50	10	3	4	37	23	+14	4	5	8	18	26	−8

Last updated: 14 March 2012.
Source: - Standings

== Sources ==
- Ugo Boccassi, Enrico Dericci, Marcello Marcellini. Alessandria U.S.: 60 anni. Milano, G.E.P., 1973.
- Mimma Caligaris. NovantAlessandria. Il Piccolo, Alessandria, 2002.
- Fabrizio Melegari. Almanacco Illustrato del Calcio - La Storia 1898-2004. Panini Edizioni, Modena, September 2005.
