= Morando (name) =

Morando is both a given name and a surname. Notable people with the name include:

- Morando Morandini (1924–2015), Italian film critic, author, journalist and actor
- Bernardo Morando (ca. 1540–1600), Italian architect
- Bernardo Morando (1589—1656) Italian poet, novelist and playwright
- Clemente Morando (1899–1972), Italian footballer

== See also ==
- Mal morando, a cutaneous condition caused by onchocerciasis
