= Renato Cattaneo =

Renato Cattaneo may refer to:

- Renato Cattaneo (footballer, born 1903), Italian football player and coach who played for the Italian national team, Alessandria and Roma in the 1930s and later managed Alessandria and Parma
- Renato Cattaneo (footballer, born 1923), Italian footballer who played for Lucchese, Como and Catania in the 1950s
