= Leale =

Leale can refer to:

== People ==
- Charles Leale (1842–1932), American surgeon
- Ettore Leale (1896–1963), Italian footballer
- John Leale (1892–1969), Guernsey judge and Methodist minister

== Places ==
- Leale, an old German name for the Estonian town of Lihula.

== See also ==
- Meale
