= Cesare Martin =

Italian footballer (1901–1971)

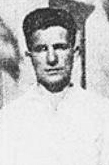

Personal information
- Full name: Cesare Martin
- Date of birth: 14 May 1901
- Place of birth: Ronco Canavese, Italy
- Date of death: 1971 (aged 69–70)
- Position: Defender

Youth career
- 1914–1919: Torino

Senior career*
Years	Team	Apps	(Gls)
1919–1936	Torino	354	(1)
1936–1941	Pinerolo	?	(?)
Total		354+	(1+)

International career
1923	Italy	1	(0)
- * Club domestic league appearances and goals

Cesare Martin (Italian pronunciation: [ˈtʃeːzare marˈtin]; 14 May 1901 – 26 February 1971) was an Italian footballer who played as a defender. He was known as Martin II to distinguish himself from his three brothers Piero (I), Dario (III) and Edmondo (IV).

== Club career ==
Grown in the Torino youth, he moved to the first team in 1919–20. He made his debut on 28 December 1919 in an away fixture against Alessandria, won 1–0. He represented the club in 354 games in the league, and scored one goal. He also disputed a game of Coppa Italia. He is the 6th player with the most appearances in the history of the Granata.

The only goal scored by Martin II was marked on 25 March 1923 in a home match against Virtus Bologna (3–0). He played his last game for Torino on 26 December 1935, in a Coppa Italia fixture against Reggiana. He played continuously from 29 February 1920, until 18 December 1927 contending 170 consecutive games without forfeiting his place in the team. He won the Scudetto with Torino in 1926–27 (later revoked), and in 1927–28, as well as the Coppa Italia in 1935–36.

He subsequently moved to Pinerolo, where he spent five seasons, before ending his career.

== International career ==
With Italy he only played 44 minutes on 27 May 1923, in a 1–5 loss in front of 25,000 spectators in a friendly against the Czechoslovakia national team. He entered in 46th minute, replacing Umberto Caligaris.

== Honours ==
=== Club ===
Torino

- Divisione Nazionale/Serie A: 1927–28
- Coppa Italia: 1935–36
