= Malinverni =

Malinverni is an Italian surname. Notable people with the surname include:

- Ermando Malinverni (1919–1993), Italian footballer
- Giorgio Malinverni (born 1941), Swiss judge and law professor
- Stefano Malinverni (born 1959), Italian sprinter
