= Luigi Vercelli =

Italian footballer

Personal information
- Full name: Luigi Vercelli
- Date of birth: 1898
- Place of birth: Turin, Italy
- Date of death: 1972 (aged 73–74)
- Position: Defender

Senior career*
Years	Team	Apps	(Gls)
1919–1920	Amatori Torino	?	(?)
1920–1921	Alessandria	17	(1)
1921–1924	Novese	44	(5)
1924–1925	SPAL	23	(0)
1925–1927	Reggiana	18	(0)

International career
1921	Italy	1	(0)
- * Club domestic league appearances and goals

Luigi Vercelli (Italian pronunciation: [luˈiːdʒi verˈtʃɛlli]; 1898 – 1972) was an Italian footballer who played as a defender. On 6 November 1921, he represented the Italy national football team on the occasion of a friendly match against Switzerland in a 1–1 away draw.

== Honours ==
=== Player ===
Novese

- Italian Football Championship: 1921–22
