= Vittorio Sardelli =

Italian footballer

Personal information
- Full name: Vittorio Sardelli
- Date of birth: 10 June 1918
- Place of birth: Borgo Val di Taro, Italy
- Date of death: 7 October 2000 (aged 82)
- Place of death: Recco, Italy
- Position: Defender

Senior career*
| Years | Team | Apps | (Gls) |
| 1937–1938 | Ampelea | 25 | (0) |
| 1938–1951 | Genoa | 233 | (3) |

International career
| 1939 | Italy | 1 | (0) |
- * Club domestic league appearances and goals

Vittorio Sardelli (Italian pronunciation: [vitˈtɔːrjo sarˈdɛlli]; 10 June 1918 – 7 October 2000) was an Italian footballer who played as a defender. On 26 November 1939, he represented the Italy national football team on the occasion of a friendly match against Germany in a 5–2 away loss.
