= Carlo Ghigliano =

Italian footballer and manager (1891-1966)

Personal information
- Full name: Carlo Ghigliano
- Date of birth: 8 October 1891
- Place of birth: Bastia Mondovì, Italy
- Date of death: 6 August 1966 (aged 74)
- Place of death: Genoa, Italy
- Position: Defender

Senior career*
Years	Team	Apps	(Gls)
1909–1915	Savona	18	(1)
1919–1920	Geona	22	(0)
1920–1926	Savona	47	(1)
1924–1925	Albenga	?	(?)

International career
1920	Italy	1	(0)

Managerial career
- 1928–1929: Albenga
- * Club domestic league appearances and goals

Carlo Ghigliano (Italian pronunciation: [ˈkarlo ɡiʎˈʎaːno]; 8 October 1891 – 6 August 1966) was an Italian association football manager. He was a former footballer who played as a defender. On 28 March 1920, he represented the Italy national football team on the occasion of a friendly match against Switzerland in a 3–0 away loss.
