= Angelo Mattea =

Italian footballer (1892–1960)

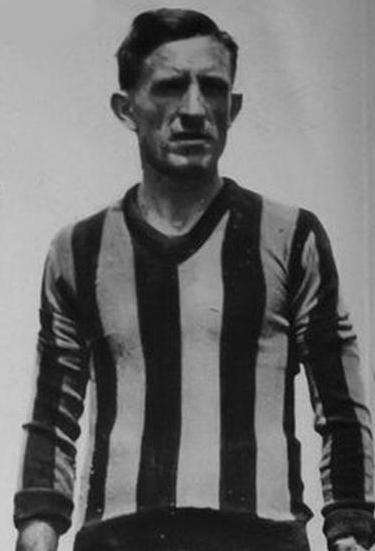

Personal information
- Date of birth: 21 October 1892
- Place of birth: Santhià, Italy
- Date of death: 1960 (aged 67–68)
- Position: Right half

Senior career*
Years	Team	Apps	(Gls)
1911–12	Piemonte		
1912–15	Casale	51	(26)
1915–20	Juventus	20	(4)
1920–21	US Torinese		
1921–31	Casale	189	(55)
Total		260	(85)

International career
1914–1921	Italy	5	(1)

Managerial career
- 1936–1938: Napoli
- * Club domestic league appearances and goals

Angelo Mattea (Italian pronunciation: [ˈandʒelo matˈtɛːa]; 21 October 1892 – 1960) was an Italian football player and manager from Santhià in the Province of Vercelli. He played club football as a forward or midfielder for several teams in Italy including Casale, which he helped to win the 1913–14 scudetto, and Juventus. He also played for the Italy national team five different times between 1914 and 1921, scoring once.

Mattea currently holds the record for being the oldest player ever to score their first Serie A goal, a feat which he accomplished at the age of 38 years and 7 days, for Casale, in a 5–1 away loss to Ambrosiana on 28 October 1930. (Note: Although Mattea had previously played and scored in previous editions of the top division of Italian football, Serie A was only established during the 1929–30 season)

== Honours ==
Casale

- Italian Football Championship: 1913–14
