= Augusto Bergamino =

Italian footballer (1898-1976)

Personal information
- Date of birth: 12 July 1898
- Place of birth: Genoa, Kingdom of Italy
- Date of death: 29 January 1976 (aged 77)
- Place of death: Venice, Italy
- Position: Forward

Senior career*
Years	Team	Apps	(Gls)
1914–1916	Genoa	10	(5)
1916–1917	Bologna		
1919–1926	Genoa	109	(19)
1926–1928	Astigiani		
1928–1931	Asti		
1931–1934	Rapallo Ruentes		

International career
1920–1923	Italy	5	(0)
- * Club domestic league appearances and goals

Augusto Bergamino (Italian pronunciation: [auˈɡusto berɡaˈmiːno]; 12 July 1898 – 29 January 1976) was an Italian footballer who played as a forward.

== Club career ==
Bergamino played for Genoa C.F.C. for 10 seasons.

== International career ==
Bergamino made his debut for the Italy national football team on 18 January 1920 in a game against France.

== Personal life ==
Bergamino's younger brother Giacomo Bergamino also played football professionally. To distinguish them, Augusto was referred to as Bergamino I and Giacomo as Bergamino II.

== Honours ==
Genoa

- Champion of Italy: 1915, 1922–23, 1923–24.
