= Renato Cattaneo (footballer, born 1923) =

Italian footballer

Personal information
- Date of birth: 16 December 1923
- Place of birth: Como, Italy
- Date of death: May 2017 (aged 93–94)
- Position: Midfielder

Senior career*
Years	Team	Apps	(Gls)
1953	Calcio Catania		
- * Club domestic league appearances and goals

Renato Cattaneo (16 December 1923 – May 2017) was an Italian footballer. He was born in Como, Rovellasca, Italy on 16 December 1923. Cattaneo died in May 2017, at the age of 93.
