= Giuseppe Parodi =

Italian footballer

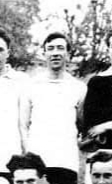
- Parodi in 1921

Personal information
- Date of birth: 17 December 1892
- Place of birth: Vercelli, Italy
- Date of death: 1 March 1984 (aged 91)
- Position: Midfielder

Senior career*
Years	Team	Apps	(Gls)
1910–1915	Casale	75	(2)
1918–1919	US Milanese	1	(0)
1919–1923	Pro Vercelli	84	(2)

International career
1913–1920	Italy	4	(0)
- * Club domestic league appearances and goals

Giuseppe Parodi (Italian pronunciation: [dʒuˈzɛppe paˈrɔːdi]; 17 December 1892 – 1 March 1984) was an Italian footballer who played as a midfielder. He competed for Italy in the men's football tournament at the 1920 Summer Olympics.
