= Mal morando =

- Specialty: Dermatology

Mal morando is a cutaneous condition caused by onchocerciasis characterized by inflammation that is accompanied by hyperpigmentation.

== See also ==
- Skin lesion
