= Giovanni Vincenzi =

Italian footballer

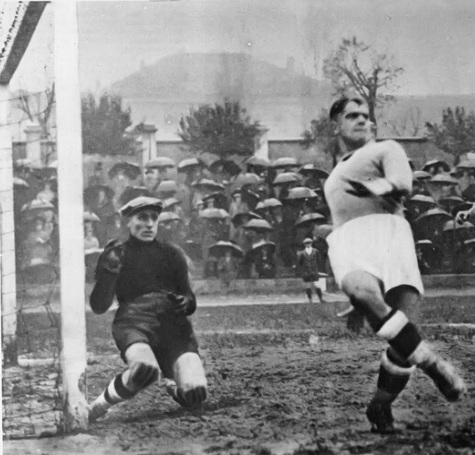
- Giuseppe Cavanna and Giovanni Vincenzi. 1933

Personal information
- Date of birth: 24 June 1905
- Place of birth: Livorno, Italy
- Date of death: 1970 (aged 64–65)
- Height: 1.74 m (5 ft 8 1/2 in)
- Position: Defender

Senior career*
Years	Team	Apps	(Gls)
1922–1927	Livorno	101	(0)
1927–1929	Torino	34	(2)
1929–1935	Napoli	169	(0)
1935–1937	Ambrosiana-Inter	19	(0)
1937–1938	Alfa Romeo Milano		

International career
1924	Italy	1	(0)
- * Club domestic league appearances and goals

Giovanni Vincenzi (Italian pronunciation: [dʒoˈvanni vinˈtʃɛntsi]; 24 June 1905 – 1970) was an Italian professional footballer who played as a defender.

== Honours ==
Torino

- Divisione Nazionale champion: 1927–28.
