= Meale =

Meale is an English surname. Notable people with the surname include:

- Alan Meale (born 1949), British politician
- Gerald Meale (born 1947), English cricketer
- Richard Meale (1932–2009), Australian composer
- Trevor Meale (1928–2010), New Zealand cricketer
