= Cinzio Scagliotti =

Italian footballer and coach (1911-1985)

Personal information
- Date of birth: 26 March 1911
- Place of birth: Alessandria, Italy
- Date of death: 26 December 1985 (aged 74)
- Place of death: Florence, Italy
- Height: 1.78 m (5 ft 10 in)
- Position: Midfielder

Senior career*
Years	Team	Apps	(Gls)
1929–1933	Alessandria	97	(27)
1933–1936	Fiorentina	71	(18)
1936–1937	Juventus	18	(5)
1937–1939	Milan	10	(1)
1939–1940	Prato	16	(2)
1940–1941	Salernitana		
1941–1942	Baratta Battipaglia		
1942–1944	Forlimpopoli		

Managerial career
- 1943–1944: Forlimpopoli
- 1947–1948: Colligiana
- 1949–1950: Cesena
- * Club domestic league appearances and goals

Cinzio Scagliotti (26 March 1911 in Alessandria – 26 December 1985 in Florence) was an Italian professional football player and coach, who played as a midfielder.
