= Dario Martin =

Italian footballer (1903–1951)

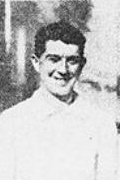
- Dario Martin

Personal information
- Full name: Dario Martin
- Date of birth: 19 January 1903
- Place of birth: Pinerolo, Italy
- Date of death: 30 November 1951 (aged 48)
- Place of death: Pinerolo, Italy
- Position: Midfielder

Senior career*
Years	Team	Apps	(Gls)
1920–1934	Torino	250	(34)
1934–1937	Pinerolo	?	(?)

International career
1927–1930	Italy	2	(0)
- * Club domestic league appearances and goals

Dario Martin (Italian pronunciation: [ˈdaːrjo marˈtin]; 19 January 1903 – 30 November 1951) was an Italian footballer who played as a midfielder. He represented the Italy national football team twice, the first being on 24 April 1927, the occasion of a friendly match against France in a 3–3 away draw.

== Honours ==
=== Player ===
Torino

- Divisione Nazionale: 1927–28 Divisione Nazionale
