= Giuseppe Farina (footballer) =

Italian footballer

Personal information
- Full name: Giuseppe Farina
- Date of birth: 4 July 1927
- Place of birth: Recanati, Italy
- Date of death: 23 September 1995 (aged 68)
- Place of death: Recanati, Italy
- Position: Defender

Senior career*
Years	Team	Apps	(Gls)
1948–1949	Chieti	32	(13)
1949–1951	Udinese	57	(4)
1951–1954	Torino	104	(0)
1954–1958	Sampdoria	135	(3)
1958–1959	Torino	24	(0)

International career
1956	Italy	1	(0)
- * Club domestic league appearances and goals

Giuseppe Farina (Italian pronunciation: [dʒuˈzɛppe faˈriːna]; 4 July 1927 – 23 September 1995) was an Italian footballer who played as a defender. On 11 November 1956, he represented the Italy national football team on the occasion of a friendly match against Switzerland in a 1–1 away draw.
