= Giovanni Gallina (footballer) =

Italian footballer

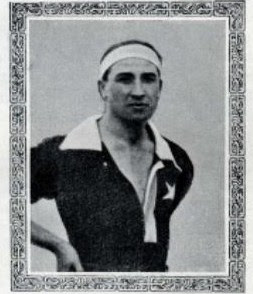

Personal information
- Full name: Giovanni Gallina
- Date of birth: 1 January 1892
- Place of birth: Casale Monferrato, Italy
- Date of death: 1963 (aged 71)
- Position: Forward

Senior career*
Years	Team	Apps	(Gls)
1909–1919	Casale	84	(19)
1919–1921	Juventus	11	(1)
1921–1925	Casale	64	(15)

International career
1914	Italy	2	(0)
- * Club domestic league appearances and goals

Giovanni Gallina (Italian pronunciation: [dʒoˈvanni ɡalˈliːna]; 1 January 1892 – 1963) was an Italian footballer who played as a forward. He represented the Italy national football team twice, the first being on 11 January 1914, the occasion of a friendly match against Austria in a 0–0 home draw.

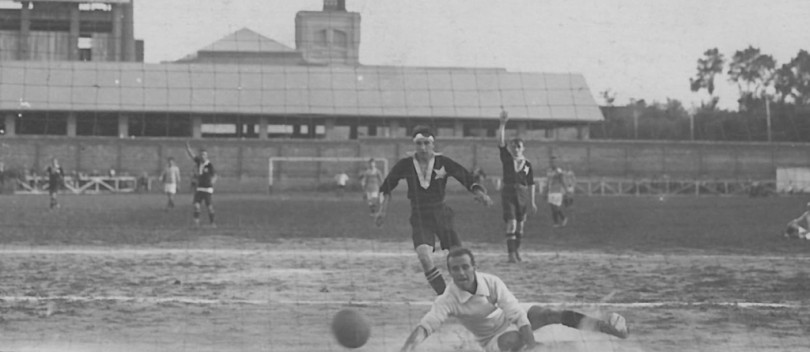
