= Casale FBC =

Association football club in Italy

Casale
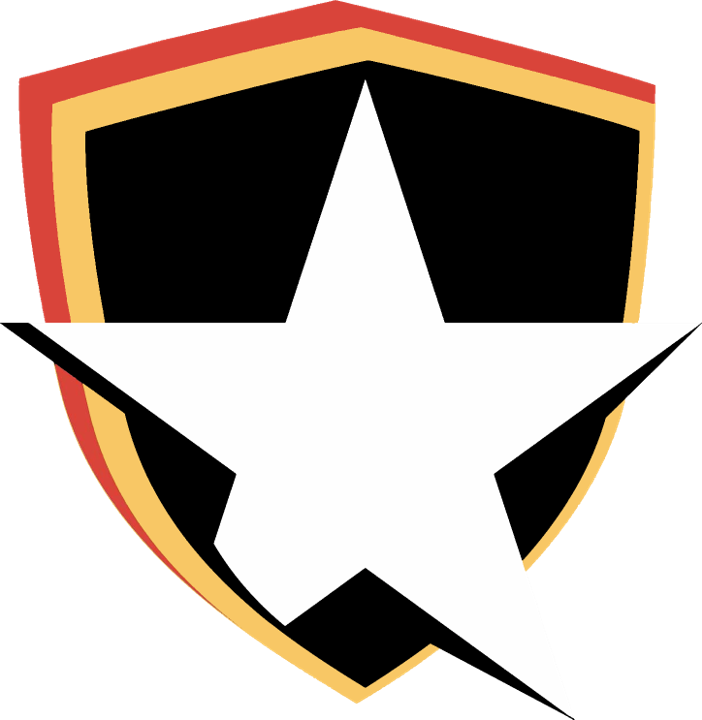
- Full name: Associazione Sportiva Dilettantistica Casale 1909
- Nickname: Nerostellati (Starred-Blacks)
- Founded: 1909; 117 years ago
- Ground: Stadio Natale Palli
- Capacity: 5,600
- Chairman: Roberto Zanforlin
- Manager: Alessandro Bellingeri
- League: Eccellenza
- Website: www.casalecalcio.com
Home colours	Away colours

Casale 1909 is an Italian football club, based in Casale Monferrato, Piedmont. The club plays in Eccellenza.

The team's nickname nerostellati ("the starred-blacks") refers to the team's colours of black with a white star on the chest.

== History ==
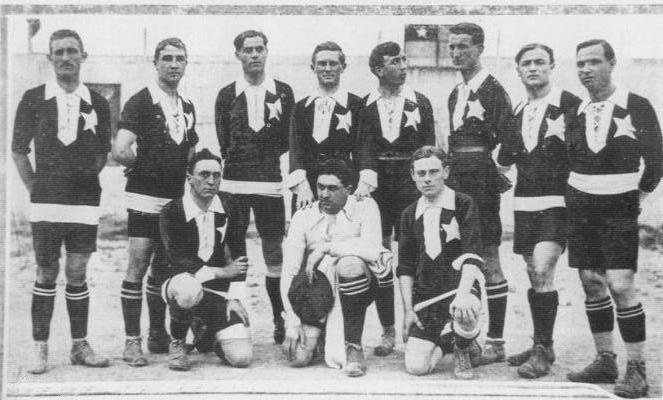
The victorious Nerostellati of 1914: Gallina (goalkeeper, holding his flat cap), Maggiani, Scrivano, Rosa, Luigi Barbesino, Giuseppe Parodi, Caira, Angelo Mattea, Giovanni Gallina, Amedeo Varese, Bertinotti.

When the club was founded in 1909 as Casale Foot Ball Club, Casale was at the geographical center of the new footballing movement in Italy. Genoa, Pro Vercelli, Milan, Torino, and Juventus were all leading clubs in the Italian football league system and Casale soon joined their ranks.

In May 1913 Casale became the first Italian club to defeat an English professional team when they beat Reading F.C. 2–1. Reading won all the other games on this tour, defeating Genoa, Milan, Pro Vercelli, and even the Italy national team.

In the following season, Casale won their first and only national title. Italian football was then organized on a regional basis and the national championship was divided into three stages. Casale topped the Ligurian-Piedmontese division and proceeded, along with second-placed Genoa, to compete in a division comprising the top northern teams, the others being Inter Milan, Juventus, Vicenza and Verona. Having won that division, Casale defeated central-southern champions Lazio 7–1, 0–2 in the two-leg final.

After World War I, Casale remained in the top division for a couple of decades, representing what had been the cradle of early Italian football.

With the development of professionalism, Casale was progressively relegated to lower divisions, 1934 being their last year in Serie A. The club was later refounded in 1993 as Associazione Sportiva Casale Calcio, in 2013 as Football Club Casale and in 2023 as Città di Casale, after financial problems. In 2025, it took the current name of Casale 1909.

A heated rivalry exists between the fans of Casale and Alessandria.

== Notable players ==
Five players who appeared in the scudetto-winning team of 1913–14 played in the Italy national team, all making their international debuts between 1912 and 1914:

- Luigi Barbesino
- Giovanni Gallina
- Angelo Mattea
- Giuseppe Parodi
- Amedeo Varese

One of Casale's biggest stars, however, was the full back Umberto Caligaris whose career with the club ran from 1919 to 1928. During his period with the nerostellati, he made 37 appearances for Italy national football team, featuring at the 1924 Summer Olympics and winning a bronze medal at the 1928 Summer Olympics before leaving Casale for Juventus. His total of 59 caps stood as a record for about 40 years.

Eraldo Monzeglio, later to represent Italy on numerous occasions, including the 1934 and 1938 World Cups, made his Serie A debut with Casale in 1923–24. The following season, however, he moved to Bologna.

Piero Operto, left back of the Grande Torino perished in the Superga air disaster, played with Casale in the years 1946–1948.

== Honours ==
=== National titles ===
- Serie A
  - Winners: 1913–14
- Serie B
  - Winners: 1929–30
- Coppa Italia Dilettanti
  - Winners: 1998–99

=== Sub-national titles ===
- Serie C
  - Winners: 1937–38 (Girone C)
- Serie C2
  - Winners: 1988–89 (Girone A)
- Serie D
  - Winners: 1973–74 (Girone A), 1985–86 (Girone A)
  - Promoted: 2003–04
