= Elvio Banchero =

Italian footballer (1904-1982)

Personal information
- Date of birth: 28 April 1904
- Place of birth: Alessandria, Italy
- Date of death: 21 January 1982 (aged 77)
- Height: 1.74 m (5 ft 9 in)
- Position: Striker

Senior career*
Years	Team	Apps	(Gls)
1921–1924	Alessandria	44	(17)
1924–1925	SPAL	21	(5)
1925–1929	Alessandria	99	(57)
1929–1932	Genova 1893	80	(42)
1932–1934	Roma	20	(3)
1934–1936	Bari	33	(9)
1936–1937	Alessandria	13	(3)
1937–1938	Parma	12	(2)

International career
1928–1931	Italy	3	(4)

Managerial career
- 1937: Alessandria
- 1937–1938: Parma
Medal record
Italy
Summer Olympics
Bronze medal – third place	1928 Amsterdam
Central European International Cup
Silver medal – second place	1931–32 Central European International Cup
- * Club domestic league appearances and goals

Elvio Banchero (Italian pronunciation: [ˈɛlvjo baŋˈkɛːro]; 28 April 1904 – 21 January 1982) was an Italian footballer who played as a striker. He competed in the 1928 Summer Olympics with the Italy national football team, winning a bronze medal.

== Club career ==
Banchero was born in Alessandria. He played for seven seasons (120 games, 48 goals) in the Italian Serie A for Genova 1893, A.S. Roma, A.S. Bari and U.S. Alessandria Calcio 1912.

== International career ==
Banchero was a member of the Italy national team which won the bronze medal in the football tournament at the 1928 Summer Olympics. He scored a hat trick (3 goals) in the 11–3 victory against Egypt, that led to the Bronze medal. He also started in the first match of the 1931–32 Central European International Cup silver winning campaign.

== Personal life ==
Elvio's younger brother Ettore Banchero played football professionally as well. To distinguish them, Elvio was referred to as Banchero I and Ettore as Banchero II.

== Honours ==
=== International ===
Italy

- Central European International Cup: Runner-up: 1931–32
- Summer Olympics: Bronze 1928
