= Giuseppe Gandini =

Italian footballer

Personal information
- Full name: Giuseppe Gandini
- Date of birth: 18 March 1900
- Place of birth: Alessandria, Italy
- Date of death: 15 October 1989 (aged 89)
- Place of death: Alessandria, Italy
- Position: Midfielder

Senior career*
Years	Team	Apps	(Gls)
1920–1921	Valenzana	?	(?)
1921–1932	Alessandria	222	(16)

International career
1925–1928	Italy	6	(0)
- * Club domestic league appearances and goals

Giuseppe Gandini (Italian pronunciation: [dʒuˈzɛppe ɡanˈdiːni]; 18 March 1900 – 15 October 1989) was an Italian footballer who played as a midfielder. He represented the Italy national football team six times, the first being on 14 June 1925, the occasion of a friendly match against Spain in a 1–0 away loss.
