= Ermando Malinverni =

Italian footballer (1919-1993)

Personal information
- Full name: Ermando Malinverni
- Date of birth: 30 October 1919
- Place of birth: Vercelli, Italy
- Date of death: 5 August 1993 (aged 73)
- Place of death: Modena, Italy
- Position: Midfielder

Senior career*
Years	Team	Apps	(Gls)
1936–1941	Biellese	114	(37)
1941–1943	Modena	50	(0)
1943–1944	Biellese	16	(1)
1945–1949	Modena	122	(3)
1949–1952	Atalanta	75	(0)

International career
1947	Italy	1	(0)
- * Club domestic league appearances and goals

Ermando Malinverni (Italian pronunciation: [erˈmando maliɱˈvɛrni]; 30 October 1919 – 5 August 1993) was an Italian footballer who played as a midfielder. On 9 November 1947, he represented the Italy national football team on the occasion of a friendly match against Austria in a 5–1 away loss.
