= 1927–28 Divisione Nazionale =

27th season of top-tier Italian football

Divisione Nazionale
- Season: 1927–28
- Champions: Torino; 1st title
- Relegated: None (Napoli, Lazio, Livorno, La Dominante, Reggiana, Hellas Verona were later readmitted to Divisione Nazionale)
- Matches played: 276
- Goals scored: 953 (3.45 per match)
- Top goalscorer: Julio Libonatti (35 goals)

The 1927-28 Divisione Nazionale was the twenty-eighth edition of the Italian Football Championship. This was the second of three seasons of the Italian Football Championship re-branded to Divisione Nazionale. It was also the fifth season from which the Italian Football Champions' adorned their team jerseys in the subsequent season with a Scudetto. The 1927–28 Divisione Nazionale season was the first Italian Football Championship won by Torino.

== Format ==
Divisione Nazionale was organised into two non-geographical round robin contests. In 1927-28 it was contested by 19 Northern Italian clubs plus SS Lazio, AS Roma and SSC Napoli. The top four teams from each of they two round robins then decided the championship via a round robin finals contest. Novara, Pro Patria, Reggiana and Lazio joined from the lower First Division. Some clubs in Rome and Genoa were merged. Newly formed AS Roma (from three merged clubs) and SSC Napoli joined the championship as special guests by order of the fascist authorities, to allow a wider representation of Southern Italy.

== First phase ==
=== Group A ===
==== Classification ====
P	Team	Pld	W	D	L	GF	GA	GD	Pts	Qualification or relegation
1.	Torino	20	14	2	4	78	19	+59	30	Qualified
2.	Genoa	20	13	3	4	42	21	+21	29	Qualified
3.	Alessandria	20	12	4	4	59	20	+39	28	Qualified
4.	Milan	20	10	6	4	35	23	+12	26	Qualified
5.	Brescia	20	9	3	8	30	37	-7	21	
6.	Pro Vercelli	20	7	4	9	29	27	+2	18	
7.	Cremonese	20	7	3	10	33	34	-1	17	
7.	Padova	20	7	3	10	24	36	-12	17	
9.	Napoli	20	5	5	10	23	54	-31	15	Later readmitted to Divisione Nazionale
10.	Lazio	20	4	3	13	17	45	-28	11	Later readmitted to Divisione Nazionale
11.	Reggiana	20	1	6	13	23	77	-54	8	Later readmitted to Divisione Nazionale

==== Results table ====
Home \ Away	ALE	BRE	CRE	GEN	LAZ	MIL	NAP	PAD	PRO	REG	TOR
Alessandria	—	4–1	5–0	4–0	6–0	0–0	11–1	3–1	0–0	11–0	3–1
Brescia	0–1	—	3–2	0–1	4–3	1–3	2–0	1–0	2–1	5–2	3–1
Cremonese	4–1	0–1	—	1–2	2–0	0–1	5–0	3–0	3–1	1–1	2–2
Genoa	2–0	0–0	4–1	—	4–0	1–1	3–0	4–1	5–0	5–2	2–1
Lazio	0–1	2–1	2–1	1–2	—	3–1	0–2	0–3	1–1	1–1	0–2
Milan	2–2	4–1	2–1	1–1	2–1	—	5–1	3–0	1–0	2–2	1–3
Napoli	1–1	0–4	3–1	2–1	0–0	1–2	—	2–2	2–0	4–0	0–1
Padova	2–1	1–1	0–2	1–2	2–0	2–1	2–1	—	1–0	2–0	0–4
Pro Vercelli	0–1	1–0	3–0	3–0	6–0	1–1	1–1	3–1	—	4–0	0–3
Reggiana	1–3	0–0	1–2	0–3	1–3	0–2	2–2	2–2	5–3	—	3–8
Torino	4–1	11–0	2–2	2–0	3–0	2–0	11–0	3–1	0–1	14–0	—

Legend: Blue = home team win; Yellow = draw; Red = away team win.

=== Group B ===
==== Classification ====
P	Team	Pld	W	D	L	GF	GA	GD	Pts	Qualification or relegation
1.	Bologna	20	10	7	3	44	16	+28	27	Qualified
2.	Juventus	20	9	6	5	37	24	+13	24	Qualified
2.	Casale	20	8	8	4	35	27	+8	24	Qualified
2.	Internazionale	20	9	6	5	40	32	+8	24	Qualified
5.	Modena	20	7	8	5	39	28	+11	22	
6.	Novara	20	8	5	7	28	29	-1	21	
7.	Pro Patria	20	8	4	8	30	34	-4	20	
8.	Roma	20	6	6	8	31	30	+1	18	
9.	Livorno	20	7	3	10	32	37	-5	17	Later readmitted to Divisione Nazionale
10.	La Dominante	20	4	6	10	26	40	-14	14	Later readmitted to Divisione Nazionale
11.	Hellas Verona	20	2	5	13	21	66	-45	9	Later readmitted to Divisione Nazionale

==== Results table ====
Home \ Away	BOL	CAS	LAD	HEL	INT	JUV	LIV	MOD	NOV	PRO	ROM
Bologna	—	4–1	10–1	1–1	2–0	7–0	3–0	1–1	1–0	1–1	3–0
Casale	0–0	—	8–1	2–2	2–0	4–1	2–1	2–5	0–0	3–2	3–2
La Dominante	0–0	0–0	—	7–0	2–0	1–1	1–1	1–0	1–2	2–3	0–0
Hellas Verona	0–1	1–1	1–2	—	1–2	1–1	1–1	2–2	1–3	2–1	2–0
Internazionale	2–4	3–2	4–1	1–0	—	6–1	3–2	2–1	3–0	5–2	3–3
Juventus	1–0	1–2	5–1	1–1	3–1	—	2–1	1–1	4–3	6–2	3–0
Livorno	0–3	1–2	5–2	2–1	0–3	4–2	—	5–3	2–1	4–1	2–1
Modena	2–1	0–0	5–1	0–0	1–1	3–1	1–1	—	5–1	2–1	2–0
Novara	4–0	0–0	1–1	3–0	2–2	0–2	1–0	2–1	—	1–0	2–1
Pro Patria	1–1	2–0	4–0	1–1	2–1	1–0	2–0	1–2	1–1	—	0–3
Roma	1–1	1–1	3–1	3–0	0–0	4–2	2–0	3–3	4–1	0–1	—

Legend: Blue = home team win; Yellow = draw; Red = away team win.

== Final round ==
=== Classification ===
P	Team	Pld	W	D	L	GF	GA	GD	Pts	Qualification or relegation
1.	Torino	14	8	3	3	33	18	+15	19	Champions
2.	Genoa	14	7	3	4	30	27	+3	17	
3.	Alessandria	14	6	4	4	31	25	+6	16	
3.	Juventus	14	7	2	5	23	17	+6	16	
5.	Bologna	14	5	5	4	28	18	+10	15	
6.	Milan	14	5	4	5	21	24	-3	14	
7.	Internazionale	14	5	1	8	27	37	-10	11	
8.	Casale	14	1	2	11	14	41	-27	4	

=== Results table ===
Home \ Away	ALE	BOL	CAS	GEN	INT	JUV	MIL	TOR
Alessandria	—	1–1	5–1	6–1	6–3	2–0	2–0	2–1
Bologna	1–1	—	7–0	3–1	3–1	0–2	5–0	1–1
Casale	5–0	3–4	—	0–4	1–3	0–2	2–2	0–3
Genoa	2–0	2–0	1–1	—	6–0	3–0	2–2	2–1
Internazionale	4–3	3–1	3–0	2–2	—	1–4	2–3	1–3
Juventus	0–0	1–1	3–0	6–1	1–0	—	0–1	1–4
Milan	3–0	1–1	2–0	1–2	1–2	3–1	—	2–2
Torino	3–3	1–0	2–1	5–1	3–2	1–2	3–0	—

Legend: Blue = home team win; Yellow = draw; Red = away team win.

== Top goalscorers ==
Rank	Player	Club	Goals
1	(Argentina) (Italy) Julio Libonatti	Torino	35
2	(Italy) Adolfo Baloncieri	Torino	31
3	(Italy) Angelo Schiavio	Bologna	26

== References and sources ==
- Almanacco Illustrato del Calcio - La Storia 1898-2004, Panini Edizioni, Modena, September 2005
