= Ettore Leale =

Italian footballer (1896–1963)

Personal information
- Full name: Ettore Leale
- Date of birth: 4 February 1896
- Place of birth: Turin, Italy
- Date of death: 13 April 1963 (aged 67)
- Place of death: Genoa, Italy
- Position: Midfielder

Senior career*
Years	Team	Apps	(Gls)
1912–1913	Genoa	4	(0)
1913–1914	→ Alessandria (loan)	?	(?)
1913–1925	Genoa	127	(2)

International career
1922–1924	Italy	2	(0)
- * Club domestic league appearances and goals

Ettore Leale (Italian pronunciation: [ˈɛttore leˈaːle]; 2 April 1896 – 13 April 1963) was an Italian footballer who played as a midfielder. On 15 January 1922, he represented the Italy national football team on the occasion of a friendly match against Austria in a 3–3 home draw.
