= Clemente Morando =

Italian footballer and manager (1899–1972)

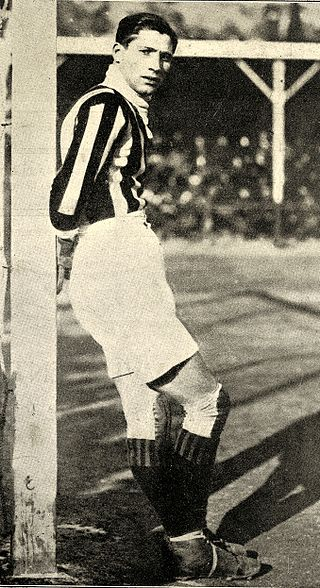

Personal information
- Full name: Clemente Morando
- Date of birth: 17 August 1899
- Place of birth: Pecetto di Valenza, Italy
- Date of death: 30 August 1972 (aged 73)
- Place of death: Valenza, Italy
- Position: Goalkeeper

Senior career*
Years	Team	Apps	(Gls)
1915–1925	Valenzana	4	(0)
1925–1929	Alessandria	42	(0)
1929–1931	Messina	49	(0)
1931–1932	Peloro	0	(0)

International career
1921–1922	Italy	3	(0)

Managerial career
- 1929–1931: Messina
- 1931–1932: Peloro
- 1948–1949: Valenzana
- * Club domestic league appearances and goals

Clemente Morando (Italian pronunciation: [kleˈmɛnte moˈrando]; 17 August 1899 – 30 August 1972) was an Italian association football manager and footballer who played as a goalkeeper. He represented the Italy national football team three times, the first being on 6 November 1921, the occasion of a friendly match against Switzerland in a 1–1 away draw.
