= Renato Cattaneo (footballer, born 1903) =

Italian footballer and manager

Personal information
- Date of birth: 6 October 1903
- Place of birth: Alessandria, Kingdom of Italy
- Date of death: 1974
- Height: 1.68 m (5 ft 6 in)
- Position: Striker

Senior career*
Years	Team	Apps	(Gls)
1922–1935	Alessandria	304	(146)
1935–1937	Roma	35	(6)
1937–1938	Asti	20	(2)
1938–1939	Alessandria	8	(2)
1939–1940	Sanremese	3	(0)

International career
1931–1935	Italy	2	(1)

Managerial career
- 1945–1946: Alessandria
- 1946–1947: Parma
- 1947–1948: Savona
- 1948–1949: Parma
- 1950–1951: Voghera
Medal record
Italy
Central European International Cup
Gold medal – first place	1933-35 Central European International Cup
- * Club domestic league appearances and goals

Renato Cattaneo (Italian pronunciation: [reˈnaːto katˈtaːneo]; 6 October 1903 – 1974) was an Italian professional football player and manager who played as a forward.

== Club career ==
Cattaneo played for 8 seasons (225 games, 73 goals) in the Serie A for U.S. Alessandria Calcio 1912 and A.S. Roma.

== International career ==
Cattaneo made his Italy national football team debut on 25 January 1931 in a game against France and scored on his debut in a 5–0 win. He did not appear for the national team again until 1935, when he made his second and last international appearance, being part of the squad that won the 1933–35 Central European International Cup.

== Honours ==
=== International ===
Italy

- Central European International Cup: 1933–35

=== Individual ===
- 4th best goalscorer in Serie A: 1934–35 Serie A (16 goals).
