= Line S2 (Nanjing Metro) =

Rapid transit line in Nanjing and Ma'anshan, China

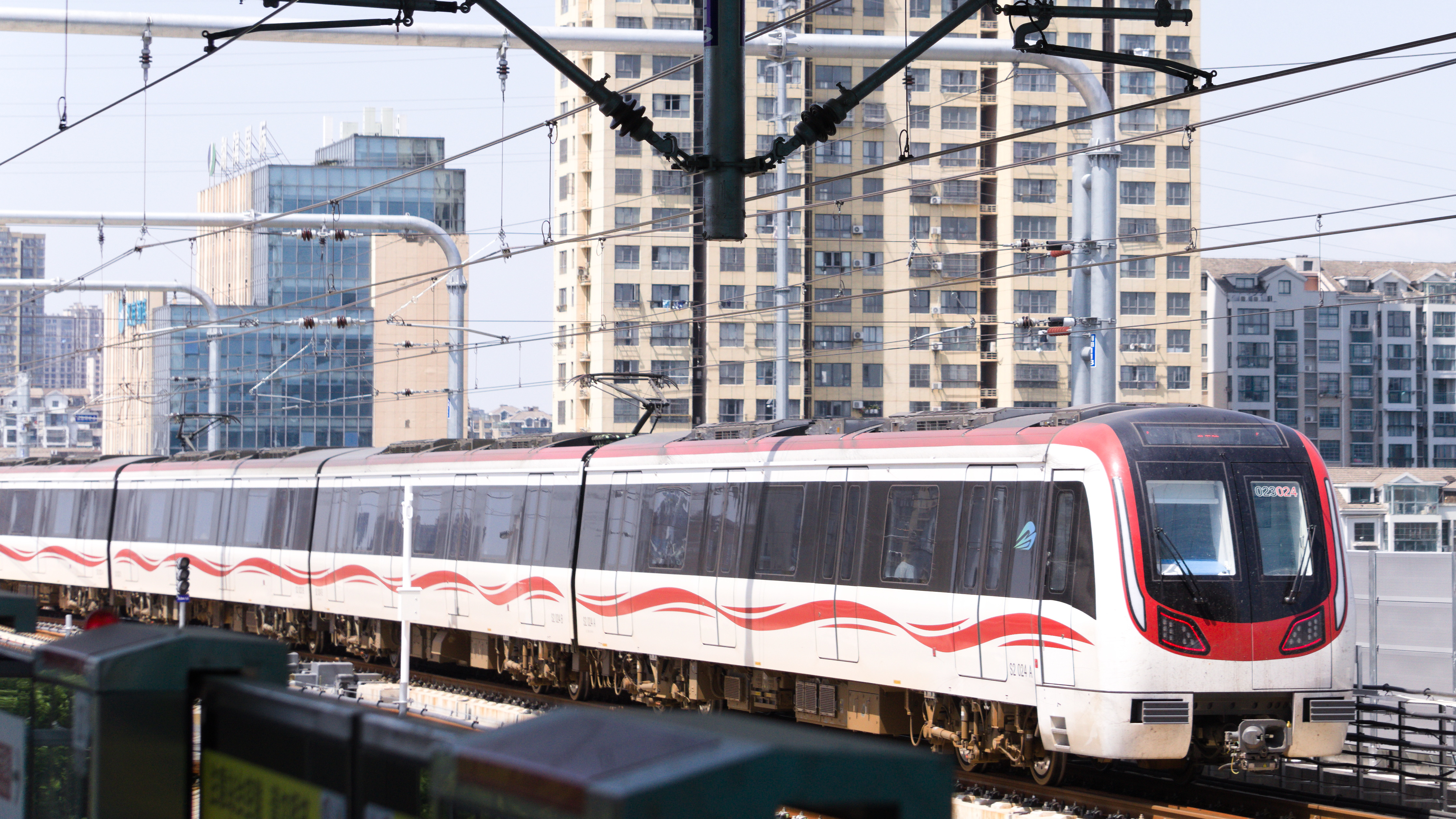
- Rolling stock of Line S2 leaving Yanghu station

Overview
- Other name(s): Nanjing-Ma'anshan intercity railway Nanjing-Ma'anshan Line (Ma'anshan section); Ningma Line (宁马线); Ningma Intercity Railway
- Native name: 南京地铁S2号线 (Nanjing section) 宁马城际铁路 (Ma'anshan section)
- Status: In operation
- Locale: Nanjing, Jiangsu; Ma'anshan, Anhui
- Termini: Xishanqiao; Taibai
- Stations: 16 (Nanjing section Phase 1 & Ma'anshan section)

Service
- Type: Rapid Transit, Intercity rail
- System: Nanjing Metro
- Operator(s): Nanjing Metro; Ma'anshan Chujiang Intercity Rail Transit Co., Ltd

History
- Opened: 22 April 2026; 6 months ago

Technical
- Line length: 54.23 km (33.7 mi)
- Num of tracks: 2
- Track gauge: 1,435 mm (4 ft 8 1/2 in)
- Electrification: 1,500 V DC overhead catenary
- Operating speed: 120 kilometres per hour (75 mph)

Line S2 (Chinese: 南京地铁S2号线; pinyin: Nánjīng Dìtiě S-Èr Hào Xiàn), known as Nanjing-Ma'anshan Intercity Railway (Chinese: 宁马城际铁路; pinyin: Níngmǎ chéngjì tiělù) in Ma'anshan Section, is a suburban rapid transit line in the Nanjing Metro system, officially put into operation on 22 April 2026 at 10:00. The line features passing loops for express services with express trains completing travel across the whole line in 30 minutes. Line S2 is the first inter-provincial metro line in Nanjing and also the second in Mainland China, the first being Line 11 of Shanghai Metro connecting Shanghai and Suzhou, Jiangsu province. It is also the first metro line in Mainland China to be jointly constructed, managed, and operated by two provinces.

== History ==
In 2020, the mayors of Nanjing and Ma'anshan jointly signed the "Ningma Intercity Railway Co-construction Cooperation Agreement".

The tender notice for the survey, design and review of the Nanjing-Ma'anshan intercity railway was released in September 2021. The first phase of the Nanjing section will have 8 stations and 26.9 kilometers, and the second phase will have 4 stations and 11.2 kilometers.

Construction of the Ma'anshan section, an elevated line from Cihugaoxinqu to Taibai, started on 30 December 2020. The Nanjing section started construction on December 28, 2021.

In December 2025, the Ma'anshan section and the Nanjing section will pass the project acceptance at the same time.

On 28 December 2025, the entire line officially started trial operation without passengers. From 1 March to 20 March 2026, the second phase of testing (running map) was implemented. On 10 April 2026, it successfully passed the completion acceptance. On 15 April 2026, the operation safety assessment of the Ma'anshan section was successfully completed, and the operation safety assessment of the Nanjing section was officially completed on 18 April.

On 22 April 2026 at 10:00, Line S2 was officially put into operation.

== Opening timetable ==
Segment	Opening	Length	Station(s)	Name
Xishanqiao — Cihugaoxinqu	April 22, 2026	26.51 km (16.5 mi)	8	Nanjing section Phase 1
Cihugaoxinqu — Taibai	April 22, 2026	27.72 km (17.2 mi)	8	Ma'anshan section

== Stations ==
Yushandonglu Station

From 9:00 to 16:00 every day, starting from 23 April 2026, express trains departing from both terminals Xishanqiao and Taibai will only stop at following stations: Jiangning Binjiang Development Zone, Hubeilu Erzhong, Yushandonglu.

Legend:

●	All trains stop
|	No express trains
△	During the morning peak on weekdays, one express train departing from Taibai at 7:09 bound for Xishanqiao.

Service Pattern			Station name		Connections	Distance km	Location	
Local	Ex	Ex1	English	Chinese	Connections	Distance km	Location	
●	●	△	Xishanqiao	西善桥	7		Yuhuatai	Nanjing, Jiangsu
●	|	|	Yuhua Jingji Development Zone	雨花经济开发区			Yuhuatai	Nanjing, Jiangsu
●	|	|	Banqiao	板桥			Yuhuatai	Nanjing, Jiangsu
●	|	|	Banqiaonan	板桥南			Yuhuatai	Nanjing, Jiangsu
●	|	|	Jiangningzhen	江宁镇			Jiangning	Nanjing, Jiangsu
●	●	△	Jiangning Binjiang Development Zone	江宁滨江开发区			Jiangning	Nanjing, Jiangsu
●	|	|	Mulong	牧龙			Jiangning	Nanjing, Jiangsu
●	|	|	Tongjing	铜井			Jiangning	Nanjing, Jiangsu
●	|	|	Cihugaoxinqu	慈湖高新区			Huashan	Ma'anshan, Anhui
●	●	△	Hubeilu Erzhong	湖北路二中			Huashan	Ma'anshan, Anhui
●	|	|	Hunanlu Angongda	湖南路安工大			Huashan	Ma'anshan, Anhui
●	●	△	Yushandonglu	雨山东路			Huashan	Ma'anshan, Anhui
●	|	|	Yanghu	阳湖			Yushan	Ma'anshan, Anhui
●	|	|	Ma'anshanjingkaiqu	马鞍山经开区			Yushan	Ma'anshan, Anhui
●	|	|	Gushu	姑孰	Dangtudong		Dangtu	Ma'anshan, Anhui
●	●	△	Taibai	太白			Dangtu	Ma'anshan, Anhui
