= Ma'anshan Yangtze River Rail-Road Bridge =

Cable-stayed bridge, China

Ma'anshan Yangtze River Rail-Road Bridge 马鞍山公铁两用长江大桥
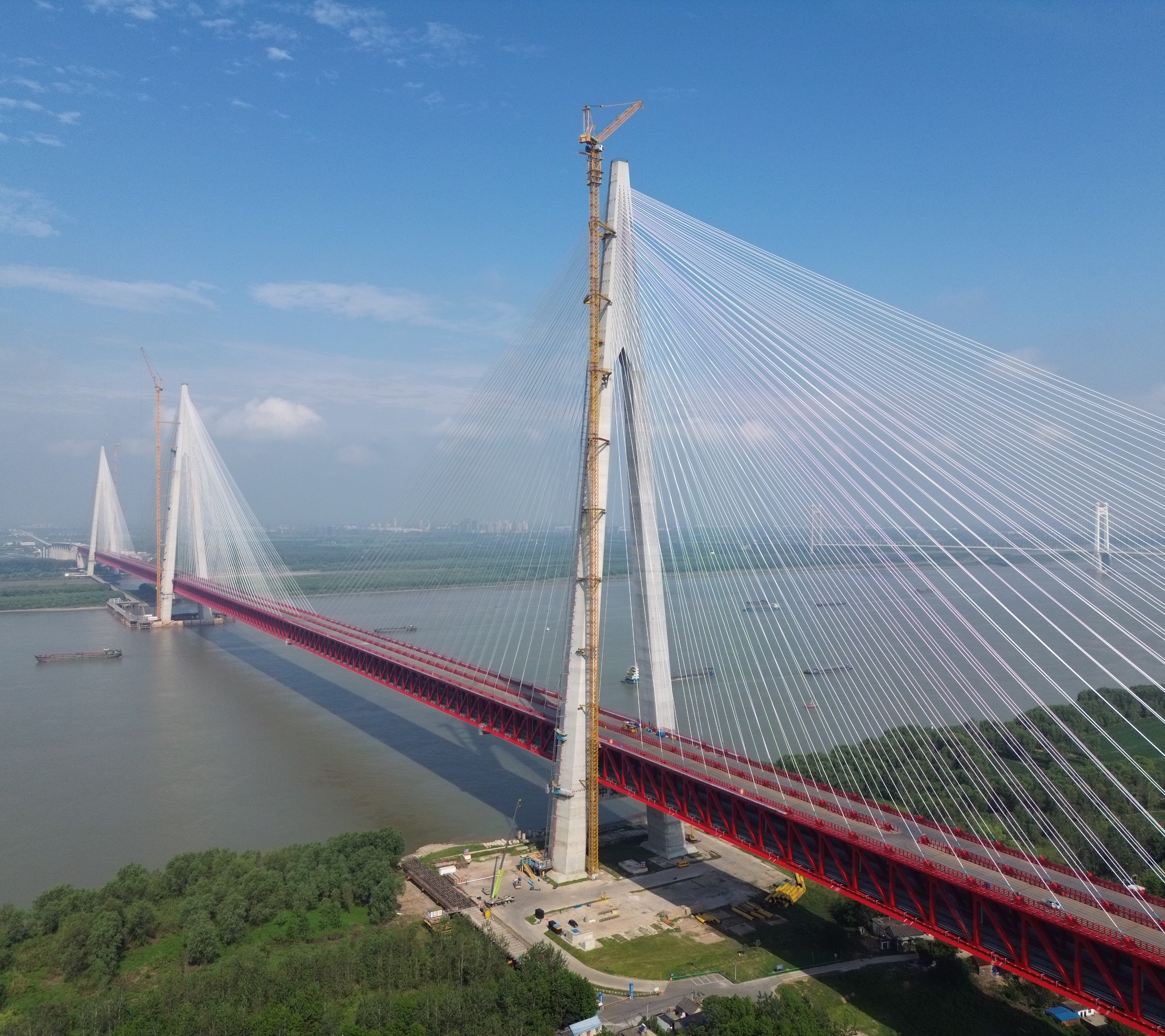
- Coordinates: 31°35′36″N 118°23′26″E
- Carries: Upper level: City Expressway; Lower level: Chaohu–Ma'anshan intercity railway
- Crosses: Yangtze River
- Locale: Ma'anshan, Anhui, China

Characteristics
- Design: Cable-stayed
- Material: Steel, concrete
- Height: 308 m (1,010 ft); 348 m (1,142 ft); 306 m (1,004 ft)
- Longest span: 1,120 m (3,675 ft) x2
- No. of lanes: Upper level: 6 lanes Lower level: 4 railway tracks

History
- Construction start: 13 January 2021

Location
- Interactive map of Ma'anshan Yangtze River Rail-Road Bridge

The Ma'anshan Yangtze River Rail-Road Bridge (Chinese: 马鞍山公铁两用长江大桥) is a cable-stayed bridge under construction near the city of Ma'anshan, in Anhui province, China, it crosses the Yangtze river between the Wuhu Yangtze River Bridge upstream and the Ma'anshan Yangtze River Bridge just two kilometers downstream.

When it opened, it is the longest double span cable-stayed bridge with two 1,120-metre (3,670 ft) main spans and one of the tallest bridge structures in the world with a height of 345 metres (1,132 ft).

== See also ==
- Bridges and tunnels across the Yangtze River
- List of bridges in China
- List of longest cable-stayed bridge spans
- List of tallest bridges in the world
