= Fratelli Beretta =

Italian food company

- Industry: meat industry
- Founded: 5 May 1812
- Headquarters: Trezzo sull'Adda, Italy
- Number of employees: 2,338 (2017)

Salumificio Fratelli Beretta S.p.A is an Italian food company, specializing in Italian-style salumi meats such as salami, prosciutto, and capocollo.

== History ==
The company was founded in 1812, and started making wurstels in 1976 under the brand Wuber.

Fratelli Beretta has sponsored Italian Serie A side Torino. Additionally it currently is its sleeve sponsor.

In 2007, Fratelli Beretta signed an EUR 10,000,000 agreement with China's Yurun Group to build a factory for Italian-style meats in China. The Ma'anshan factory opened in 2012.
