= Jinjiazhuang District =

Former district in Anhui Province, China

Coordinates: 31°43′15″N 118°29′09″E

Jinjiazhuang District 金家庄区
- District of the People's Republic of China
- 2012
Succeeded by
Huashan District
- Today part of: Part of the Huashan District, Ma'anshan

Jinjiazhuang District (Chinese: 金家庄区; pinyin: Jīnjiāzhuāng Qū) is a former district of the city of Ma'anshan, Anhui Province, China. On 10 September 2012, it was merged into Ma'anshan's Huashan District.
