= Yurun Group =

Chinese meat company

China Yurun Food Group Limited 中国雨润食品集团有限公司
- Type: Privately owned
- Industry: Meat supplier
- Founded: 1993
- Headquarters: Nanjing, Jiangsu, People's Republic of China
- Area served: People's Republic of China
- Key people: Chairman: Zhu Yicai
- Products: Pork
- Number of employees: 26,000
- Website: Yurun Group Limited

Yurun Group Limited (SEHK: 1068) is the largest meat supplier in mainland China. It is headquartered in Nanjing, Jiangsu. It operates in two food sectors, chilled meat and frozen meat, and processed meat products, which are marketed under its brand names of Yurun, Furun, Wangrun, and Popular Meat Packing.

It was listed on the Hong Kong Stock Exchange in 2005.

== Food sector expansion ==
Yurun acquired Haroulian, the Harbin Meat Union, in 2003 in the aftermath of the privatization and reorganization of Haroulian. In 2007, it entered into an EUR 10,000,000 agreement with Fratelli Beretta to produce Italian-style meats in China under the Beretta brand. The Ma'anshan Beretta factory opened in 2012.

Yurun was the first company in Zhejiang to be approved for export to South Korea in 2010.

In 2013, Yurun entered into an agreement with AFFCO Holdings to buy lamb rom AFFCO. By this time, Yurun has already started selling Wangrun-branded products to Australia and New Zealand.

== Diversification ==
Yurun's website lists the following constituent groups:

- Yurun Food Group (1068.HK)
- Yurun Real Estate Group, founded 2002
- Nanjing Central Emporium (Grp) Stocks Co., Ltd, founded 1936, majority stakes acquired 2005
- Yurun 2nd Construction Group, legally Jiangsu Lisheng Construction Engineering Co., Ltd., founded 2020
- Yurun Construction Group, founded 1993
- Yurun Hotel Management Group, founded 2011
- Yurun Agricultural Products Group, founded 2009
- Yurun Property Service Group (Jiangsu Yurun Property Service Co., Ltd), founded 2002
