= Torino FC =

Association football club in Italy

Torino
- Full name: Torino Football Club S.p.A.
- Nicknames: Il Toro (The Bull); I Granata (The Maroons)
- Founded: 3 December 1906; 119 years ago, as Foot-Ball Club Torino; 1 September 2005; 21 years ago, as Torino Football Club
- Stadium: Stadio Olimpico Grande Torino
- Capacity: 27,958
- Owner: UT Communication
- President: Urbano Cairo
- Head coach: Ignazio Abate
- League: Serie A
- 2025–26: Serie A, 12th of 20
- Website: www.torinofc.it
Home colours	Away colours	Third colours

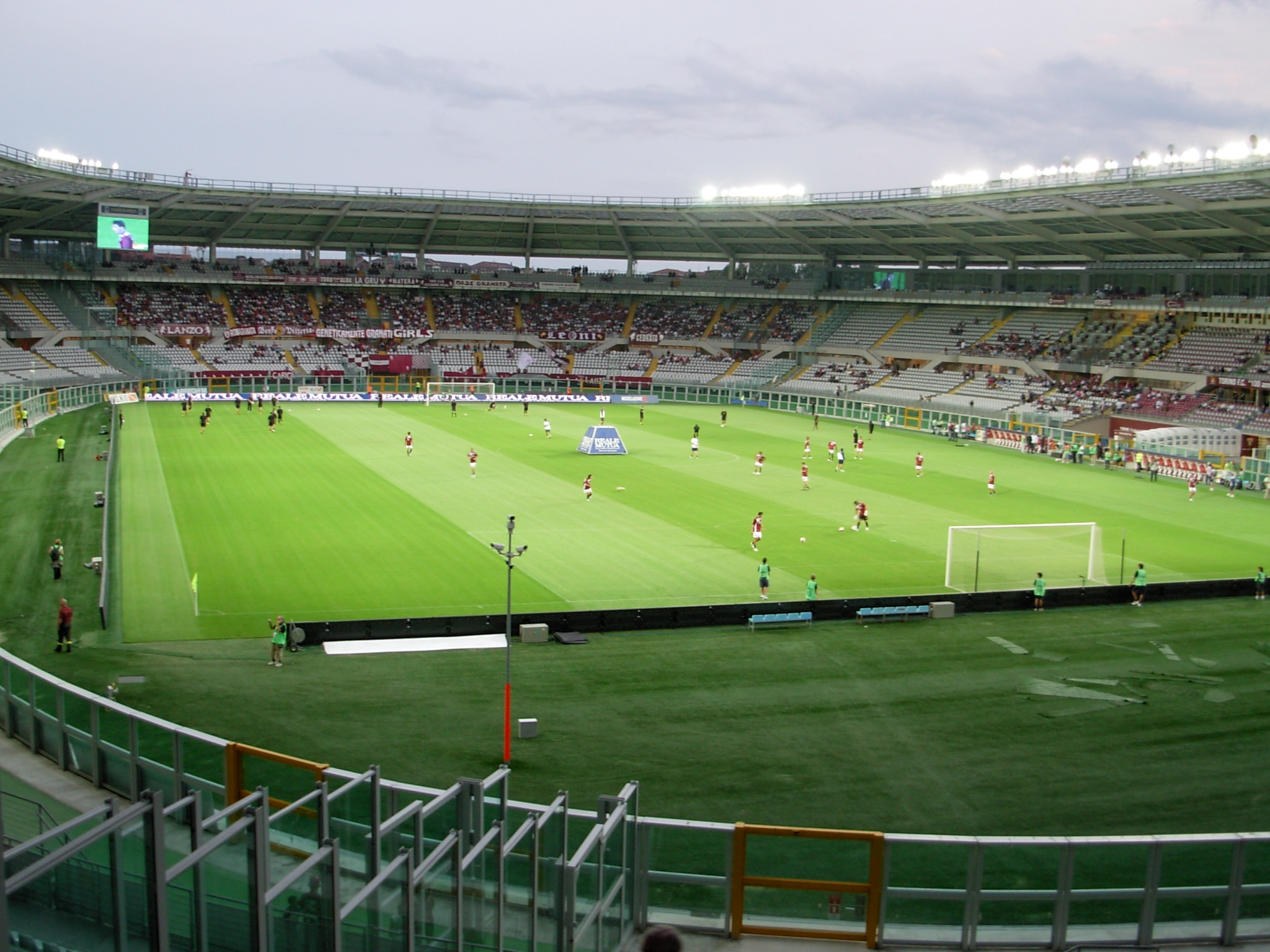
Stadio Olimpico Grande Torino

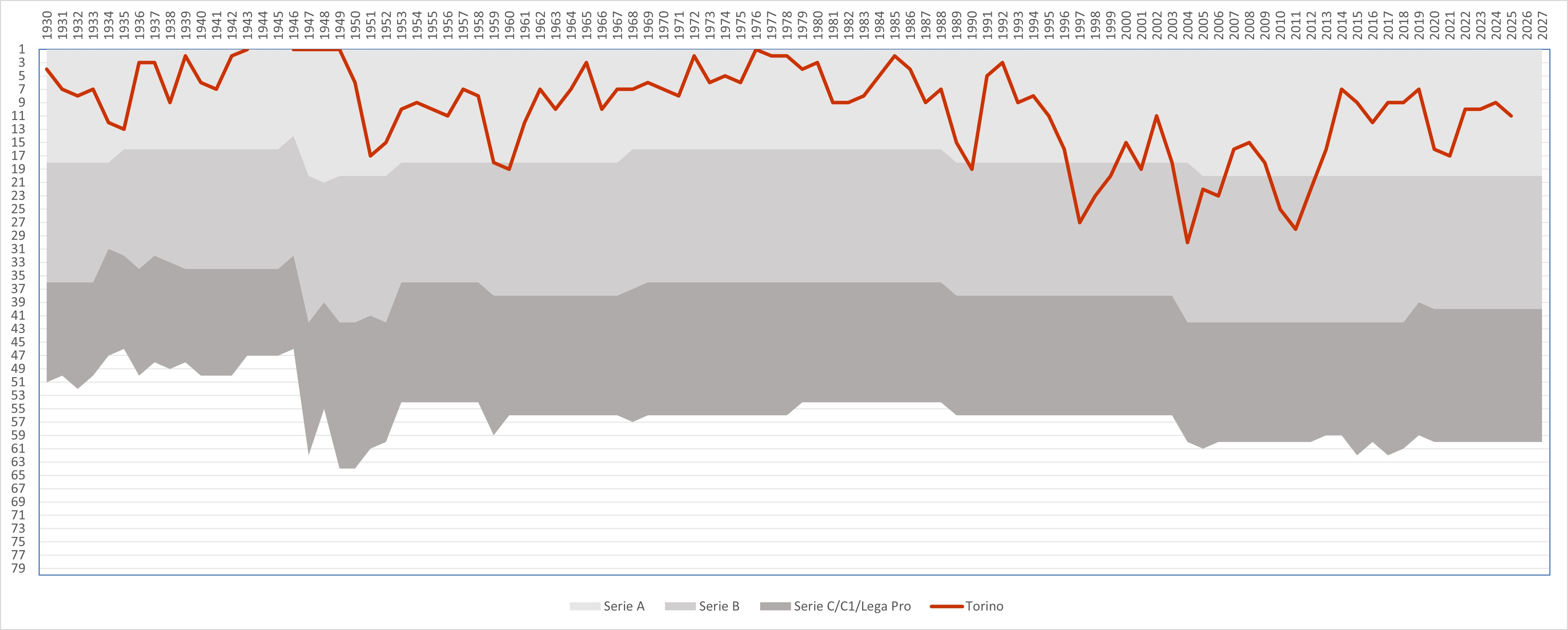
The progress of Torino in the Italian football league structure since the first season of a unified Serie A (1929–30)

Torino Football Club (Italian pronunciation: [toˈriːno]), colloquially referred to as Toro, is a professional football club based in Turin, Piedmont, Italy, that plays in Serie A, the top tier of the Italian football league system. Founded in 1906 as Foot-Ball Club Torino, they are historically among the most successful clubs in the nation with seven league titles, many of which coming from the Grande Torino era in the 1940s. Their most recent Serie A title was won in 1976. Torino have won the Coppa Italia five times, and have won one international, now-defunct tournament—the Mitropa Cup—in 1991.

Torino plays all of its home games at the Stadio Olimpico Grande Torino (also known as the Stadio Comunale "Vittorio Pozzo" until 2006). The club's traditional colour is maroon, and its symbol is a rampant bull, the traditional symbol of the city of Turin, from which the club's nickname Il Toro (The Bull) is derived. Torino have a local rivalry with Juventus and the two sides contest the Derby della Mole.

== History ==
=== The foundation and first steps ===
Football first arrived in the city of Turin at the end of the 19th century, introduced by the industrial Swiss and English. By 1887, Football & Cricket Club—the oldest Italian football club—had already been founded in the capital of Piedmont, followed in 1889 by Nobili Torino. In 1891 the two clubs merged to form Internazionale Torino, after which Football Club Torinese was founded in 1894.

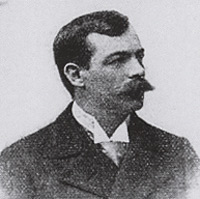
Alfred Dick, founder and then president of the newly born Foot-Ball Club Torino

The new game quickly supplanted the popularity of pallapugno, which led to the foundation of the football sections of the sports clubs Ginnastica Torino and Juventus. On 8 May 1898 Internazionale Torino, Football Club Torinese and Ginnastica Torino, along with Genoa as part of the International Exhibition for the fiftieth anniversary of the Statuto Albertino gave birth to the first Italian Football Championship.

In 1900, Football Club Torinese absorbed Internazionale Torino, and on 3 December 1906 at the Voigt brewery (now bar Norman) on Via Pietro Micca an alliance was formed with a group of Juventus dissidents, led by the Swiss financier Alfred Dick. Through the merger of Football Club Torinese and the aforementioned group, "Foot-Ball Club Torino" was formed. The first official match was played on 16 December 1906 in Vercelli against Pro Vercelli, won 3–1 by Torino.

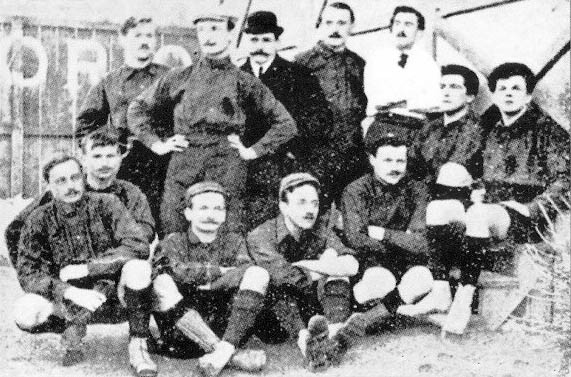
Torino players pose for a photograph in 1906.

The first derby was played in the new year, dated 13 January 1907, in which Torino defeated Juventus 2–1. Torino successfully replicated this by a margin of 4–1 a month later and gained the right to enter the final round of the Italian Football Championship, placed second behind Milan.

Torino did not participate in the 1908 Italian Football Championship as a rule was passed which limited the use of foreign players. The club instead played in two popular "minor" tournaments: the coveted "Palla Dapples" (a silver trophy in the shape of a regulation football), won against Pro Vercelli; and an international tournament organised by La Stampa, which took place in Turin that year. Torino lost in the final to Swiss side Servette.

In 1915, Torino were denied their first real championship attempt by the outbreak of World War I. With one match left to play, Torino (in second), were two points behind leaders Genoa. In the final game of the championship, Torino would have had the opportunity to play the Genoese head-on after defeating them in the first leg 6–1.

=== The first scudetto ===
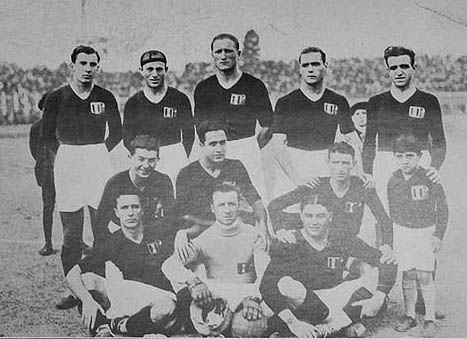
Torino during a tour of Argentina in 1929

The club experienced its first success under the presidency of Count Enrico Marone Cinzano, who was responsible for building the Stadio Filadelfia. In attack, Torino boasted the Trio delle meraviglie (Trio of Wonders), composed of Julio Libonatti, Adolfo Baloncieri and Gino Rossetti, and won their first scudetto on 10 July 1927 after a 5–0 win against Bologna. However, the title was revoked on 3 November 1927 due to the "Allemandi Case".

After the revoking of the prior scudetto, Torino were reconfirmed champions of Italy in the 1927–28 season. The "Trio of Wonders" scored 89 goals between them, with the title won on 22 July 1928, a 2–2 draw against Milan.

After the resignation of Cinzano, the club began a slow decline in the early 1930s and often finished mid-table. It was not until the 1935–36 season that it began its revival, with a third-place finish in the league and first victory of the Coppa Italia. Renamed "Associazione Calcio Torino" due to the Italian fascist regime, Torino finished in second place in the 1938–39 season, under the technical director Ernest Erbstein.

In 1939–40, Torino finished in fifth place, and saw the arrival of club president Ferruccio Novo. Novo provided financial support to the club and utilised his skill as a careful administrator. With valuable contributions from Antonio Janni, Giacinto Ellena and Mario Sperone, Novo was able to build a team known as the Grande Torino.

=== Grande Torino ===
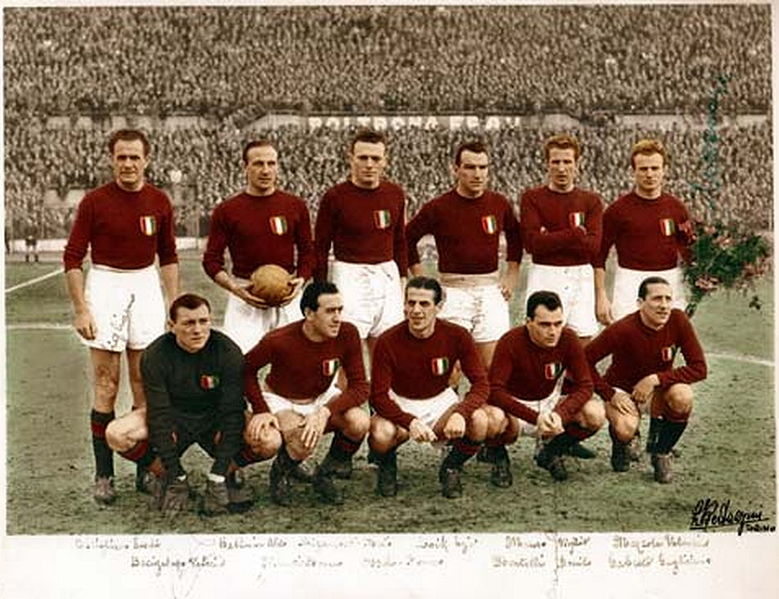
The Invincibles of the Grande Torino, winners of five consecutive Serie A titles

The club's greatest period is encapsulated in the Grande Torino, a team which won five titles in a row (not considering the interruption to the league in the 1944 Campionato Alta Italia, in which the Italian Football Federation (FIGC) in 2002 recognised only honorary value to Spezia) between 1942 and 1949, and the Coppa Italia in 1943 (due to this success, Torino was the first team to win the coveted scudetto and Coppa Italia "double" in Italy during the same season). Torino's players formed the backbone of the Italy national team in this period, at one point fielding ten players simultaneously in the Azzurri.

The captain and undisputed leader of the team was Valentino Mazzola, father of Ferruccio and Sandro, who would subsequently follow their father in becoming footballers. The typical starting lineup was: Bacigalupo; Ballarin; Maroso; Grezar; Rigamonti; Castigliano; Menti; Loik; Gabetto; Mazzola; Ossola. Their success came to an abrupt end on 4 May 1949 when the Fiat G.212 airliner carrying the whole team crashed against the retaining wall of the Basilica of Superga in Turin. The crash was attributed to dense fog and spatial disorientation due a faulty altimeter in the cockpit. The team had been returning from a friendly with Benfica played in Lisbon. In addition to the entire team and reserve players, the crash claimed the lives of coaches Egri Erbstein and Leslie Lievesley, two club officials, the club masseur, three journalists, and the four members of the crew.

=== From relegation to the title ===
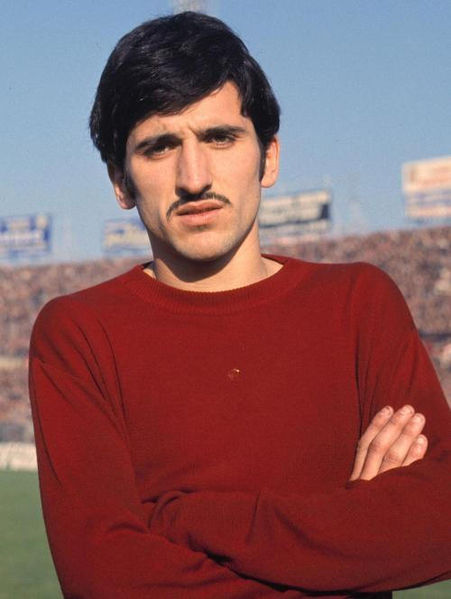
La Farfalla Granata, Gigi Meroni in the 1960s

Difficult years followed in the aftermath of the tragedy. A slow decline led to the club's first relegation to Serie B, which took place under the name "Talmone Torino" in 1958–59. The stay in Serie B would only last one season, with Torino's return to the top flight in 1960–61. In 1963, Orfeo Pianelli assumed presidency. He appointed Nereo Rocco as manager and signed club icon Gigi Meroni, nicknamed "The Maroon Butterfly" (La Farfalla Granata). In 1964–65, the team finished in third place.

On 15 October 1967, Meroni was killed while crossing the street after a league game. Despite the tragedy, Torino finished the season in seventh place and won the Coppa Italia. The reconstruction of a winning team, initiated by the club president Pianelli, continued with the victory of another Coppa Italia in the 1970–71 season.

In the 1971–72 season, Torino managed a third-place finish, placed just one point behind Juventus. Across the following three seasons, Torino placed sixth, fifth, and sixth again ahead of what would be their seventh Serie A title in the 1975–76 season. The scudetto was won after a comeback against Juventus, who held a five-point advantage over the Granata during the spring. However, three straight losses for the Bianconeri, the second of which was in the derby, allowed Torino to overtake. In the final round, Torino held a one-point advantage and, until then, had won every previous home fixture. Torino hosted Cesena at the Comunale but could only manage to draw; Juventus, however, were defeated at Perugia. The title was won by two points ahead of Juventus, 27 years after the Superga tragedy.

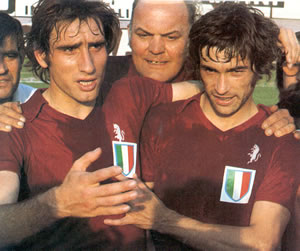
Francesco Graziani and Paolo Pulici, Torino's attacking duo in the 1975–76 season

The same title race was repeated the next year in a season that saw Torino finish with 50 points behind Juventus' 51, a record points total for the 16-team league format. In 1978, Torino finished second again (tied with a Vicenza side led by Paolo Rossi), still behind Juventus but with a larger gulf in points. In later years, whilst still remaining one of Serie A's top teams, the team began a slow decline and was not able to replicate past results, with the exception of the second place in 1984–85, where the team finished behind a Verona side led by Osvaldo Bagnoli.

=== Journey in Europe and bankruptcy ===
At the end of the 1988–89 season Torino were relegated to Serie B for the second time in their history. The club was promoted back to Serie A in the 1989–90 season, and after having made important signings, qualified for the UEFA Cup under Emiliano Mondonico. The following season, Torino knocked Real Madrid out of the 1991–92 UEFA Cup in the semifinals, but lost the final on the away goals rule to Dutch side Ajax, after a 2–2 draw in Turin and 0–0 in Amsterdam. In Serie A, Torino finished in third place.

In the 1992–93 season, Torino won their fifth Coppa Italia after defeating Roma, however the club subsequently went through a period of severe economic difficulties. The club changed presidents and managers several times, but the results continued to worsen, and at the end of the 1995–96 season, Torino were relegated for a third time.

After a play-off lost on penalties in the 1997–98 season to Perugia, Torino returned to Serie A in 1998–99, but were once again relegated at the end of the 1999–2000 season. The club was immediately promoted back in the 2000–01 season, and the following year finished in 11th place, and qualified for the Intertoto Cup. After being eliminated by Villarreal on penalties, Torino suffered its worst performance in Serie A, and were relegated after finishing in last place. Under Renato Zaccarelli, Torino achieved promotion in the 2004–05 season. However, due to heavy debts accumulated under the president Francesco Cimminelli, Torino were denied entry into Serie A and the club's bankruptcy was announced on 9 August 2005. On 16 August, the FIGC accepted the proposal of a new professional entity known as "Società Civile Campo Torino", formed by a group of businessmen and led by lawyer Pierluigi Marengo. The club was granted admission to the Petrucci Law, which guaranteed registration to Serie B, as well as all of the sporting titles of "Torino Calcio." On 19 August, Urbano Cairo was officially announced as the new president of the club at the bar Norman (once known as Voigt brewery). With the sale, the club changed its name to "Torino Football Club".

Torino achieved immediate promotion in the 2005–06 season after winning the play-offs. The following season, Torino escaped relegation in the penultimate round of matches. After three seasons, the club once again were relegated to Serie B. During the 2009–10 season, Cairo named Gianluca Petrachi as the new sporting director at Torino, but the club failed to gain promotion that season and the one following.

=== Return to Europe ===
On 6 June 2011, the club officially announced Gian Piero Ventura as the new manager ahead of the 2011–12 Serie B season, with Ventura signing a one-year contract. After a long campaign, Torino secured promotion to Serie A on 20 May 2012, after defeating Modena 2–0 in the penultimate round of the season. After achieving safety from relegation in the 2012–13 season, the 2013–14 season marked a sharp upturn for Torino, who finished seventh place, and qualified for the 2014–15 Europa League. The stars of the year were Alessio Cerci and Ciro Immobile; the latter finished as the top scorer in Serie A.

The 2014–15 season saw Torino reach the round of 16 of the Europa League, where they were eliminated by Zenit Saint Petersburg. In the league, Torino finished ninth, and in spring, won their first derby in 20 years. The following year, Torino finished the 2015–16 season in twelfth place, after which Ventura, after five years in charge, left the club for the Italy national football team. He was replaced by Siniša Mihajlović, who finished the 2016–17 season in ninth place. He was replaced by Walter Mazzarri in January, who guided the club to another ninth-place finish at the end of the 2017–18 season. The following season Torino finished in seventh place and qualified for the Europa League after a five-year absence. Torino finished the season on 63 points, a club record since the introduction of the three points system in 1994. Torino, however, would fail to enter the group stages of the 2019–20 Europa League after being eliminated in the play-offs by Wolverhampton Wanderers. In the league, after a strong start to the season, Torino collapsed and only obtained a minimum achievement of safety from relegation.

The following season was also negative, and marked by the alternation on the bench of managers Marco Giampaolo and Davide Nicola. Torino managed only to achieve safety from relegation on the penultimate round of the season with a 0–0 draw away against Lazio. The following season saw the arrival of Ivan Jurić on the bench, who guided the club to a tenth-place finish. The following season saw Torino finish again in tenth-place, missing out on qualification to the UEFA Conference League by 3 points. In the following season, the team finished ninth-place in the standings, failing to qualify for the Conference League due to Fiorentina's defeat in the final of the Conference League. Ivan Jurić departed the club at the end of the season after 3 years and was replaced by Paolo Vanoli. Under Vanoli, the club made big signings in the summer, such as Duván Zapata and Saúl Coco. But despite the efforts, Torino finished 11th and got eliminated in the second round of the Coppa Italia by relegation candidates Empoli. Thus, Vanoli got sacked for 2025-26 and replaced by Marco Baroni. Still the club barely had succeeded, with Baroni being also sacked. At the end, Torino finished 12th under Roberto D'Aversa, but nevertheless reached the quarterfinals of the Coppa Italia.

== Colours and badge ==
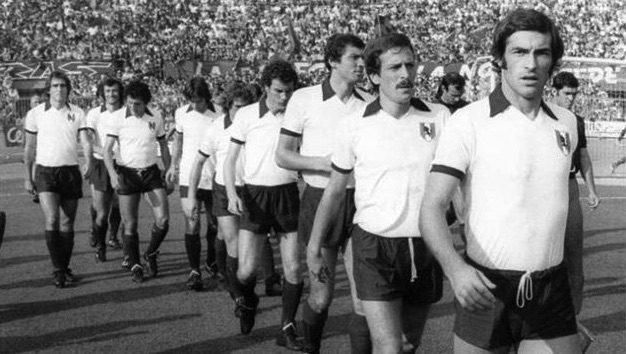
Torino in 1976–77 with the traditional away shirt with the scudetto on the chest which encompasses the bull in a rampant position

The first uniform used by Torino only a few days after its foundation and in the first game of its history against Pro Vercelli was striped orange and black, similar to the kits used by Internazionale Torino and Football Club Torinese, the historical predecessors of the newly formed club. Incidentally, the colours were too similar to that of the Habsburgs, historical enemies of the then ruling Italian house and considered inappropriate. Given the need to adopt a definitive color the founders opted in the end for granata, a dark shade of red similar to burgundy.

The most widely accepted story is that it was adopted in honour of the Duke of the Abruzzi and the House of Savoy, which, after the victorious liberation of Turin from the French in 1706, adopted a blood-colored handkerchief in honour of a messenger killed bringing the news of victory. Other accounts, considered less reliable, speak of a tribute to the founder Alfred Dick, who was a fan of the Genevan team Servette, the Swiss club of the founders homeland, or a reference to the English club Sheffield, the oldest football club in the world, whose colours were also initially adopted by Internazionale Torino. There is even the possibility that the dark red was created by chance, as a result of repeated washing—a reconstruction that is found with many other club's football kits—among the uniforms that were red with black socks; the colour derived, being considered a good omen, would eventually be chosen as the official colour. Previously, the club had tried to obtain permission to use royal blue, but the monarchs of Italy were reluctant to grant the use of their dynastic color to a single team, as opposed to a few years later, when Azure adopted by the various national sports teams.

Since then, the traditional home jersey of Torino has been composed of a kit combined with white, but occasionally also maroon shorts and black socks with maroon cuff. However, it has not been unusual to see the team take to the field with maroon socks, especially at the turn of the 1970s and 1980s when the team permanently adopted a complete maroon kit. The away uniform, usually in reverse colours, consists of a white shirt with contrasting cuffs, maroon or sometimes white shorts, white socks and a maroon lapel. In contrast, an away shirt with a diagonal maroon band has also been used. This is an homage to River Plate, the Argentine club which has had close historical ties to Torino since the Superga air disaster. the shirt was debuted on 6 January 1953 in a 1–1 league draw against Milan.

The Torino club badge has always featured a rampant bull, the symbol of the city of Turin. The current badge was adopted in the 2005–06 season, the first following the bankruptcy of Torino Calcio. The "1906" on the left side of the shield was later added to denote the founding year of the historic Foot-Ball Club Torino.

In the 1980s, the Torino badge was square in shape with a stylised bull and the words "Torino Calcio". This badge is still held in high regard by the fans, and in 2013 it was voted by the readers of Guerin Sportivo as the most beautiful club logo of all time. From 1990 until the bankruptcy, the badge in use recalled the one used at the time of the Grande Torino, with the important difference that the right side of the oval crossed the letter "T" and "C" (initials of "Torino Calcio") instead of the letters "A", "C" and "T" (initials of "Associazione Calcio Torino").

In 2017, the Irish club Wexford Youths renamed itself Wexford F.C. and adopted a new crest with rampant bull, inspired by Torino's. Club chairman Mick Wallace is known to be a Torino fan.

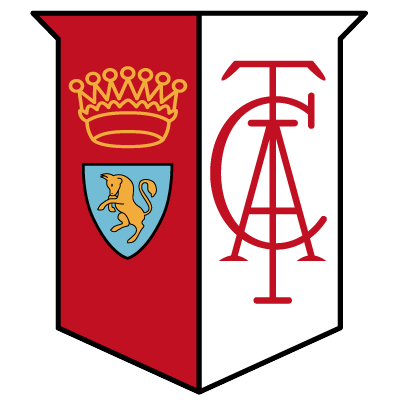
Crest of Torino (1936–1946)

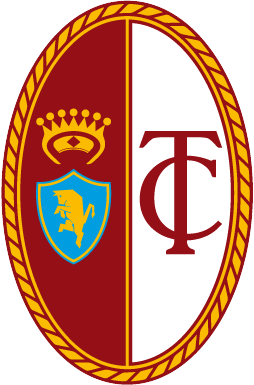
Crest of Torino (1946–1983, 1990–2005)

== Stadium ==
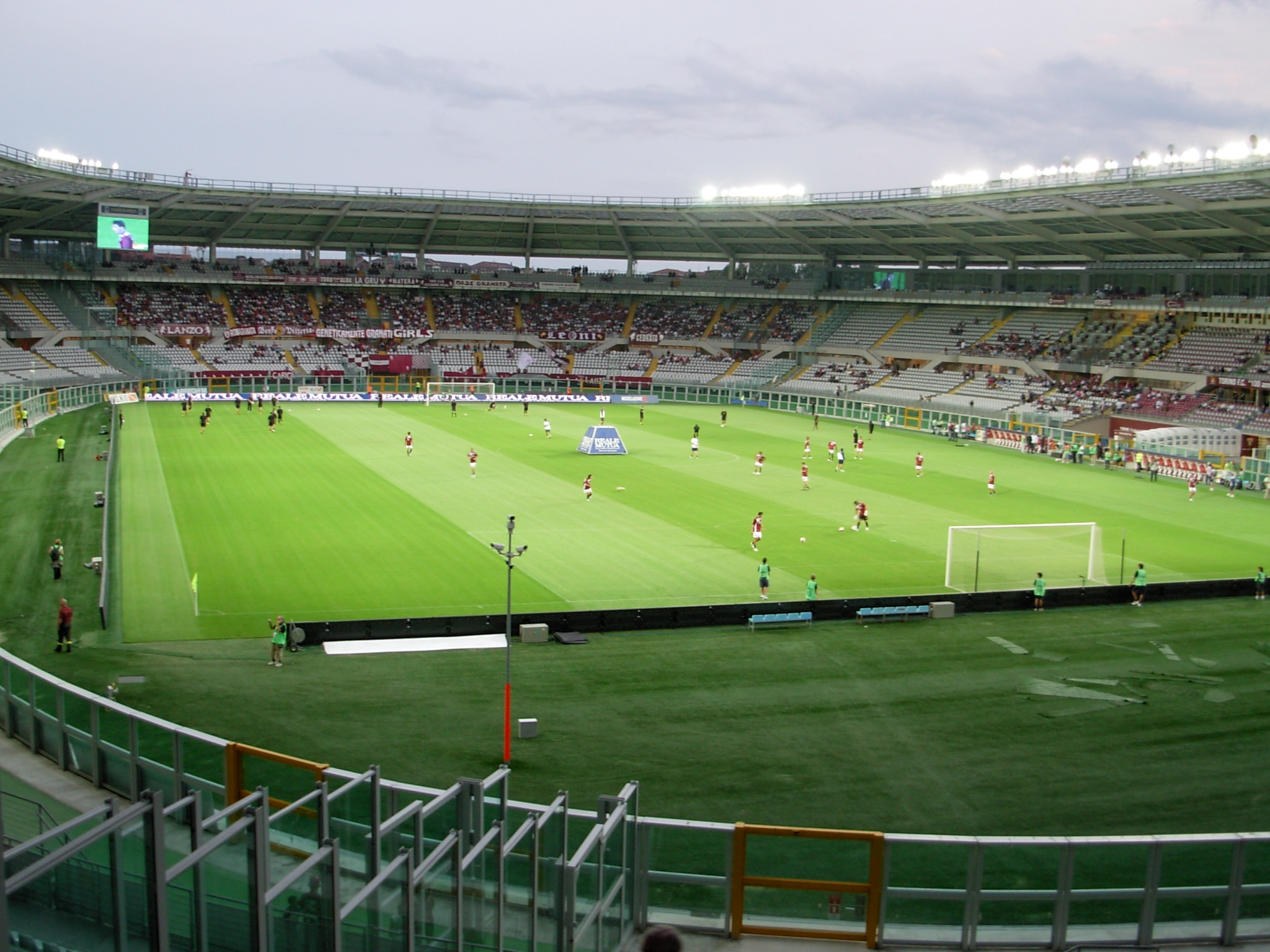
The Stadio Olimpico Grande Torino in 2007

The first official match after the club's foundation, a derby match against Juventus, took place on 13 January 1907 at the Stadio Velodrome Umberto. The club later moved to the Piazza d'armi, which comprised numerous pitches: from 23 January 1911, the Lato Ferrovia; and from 26 February 1911, the Lato Crocetta. Towards the end of 1913 the club moved to the Stradale Stupinigi; with the outbreak of the First World War, the stadium was requisitioned for military purposes.

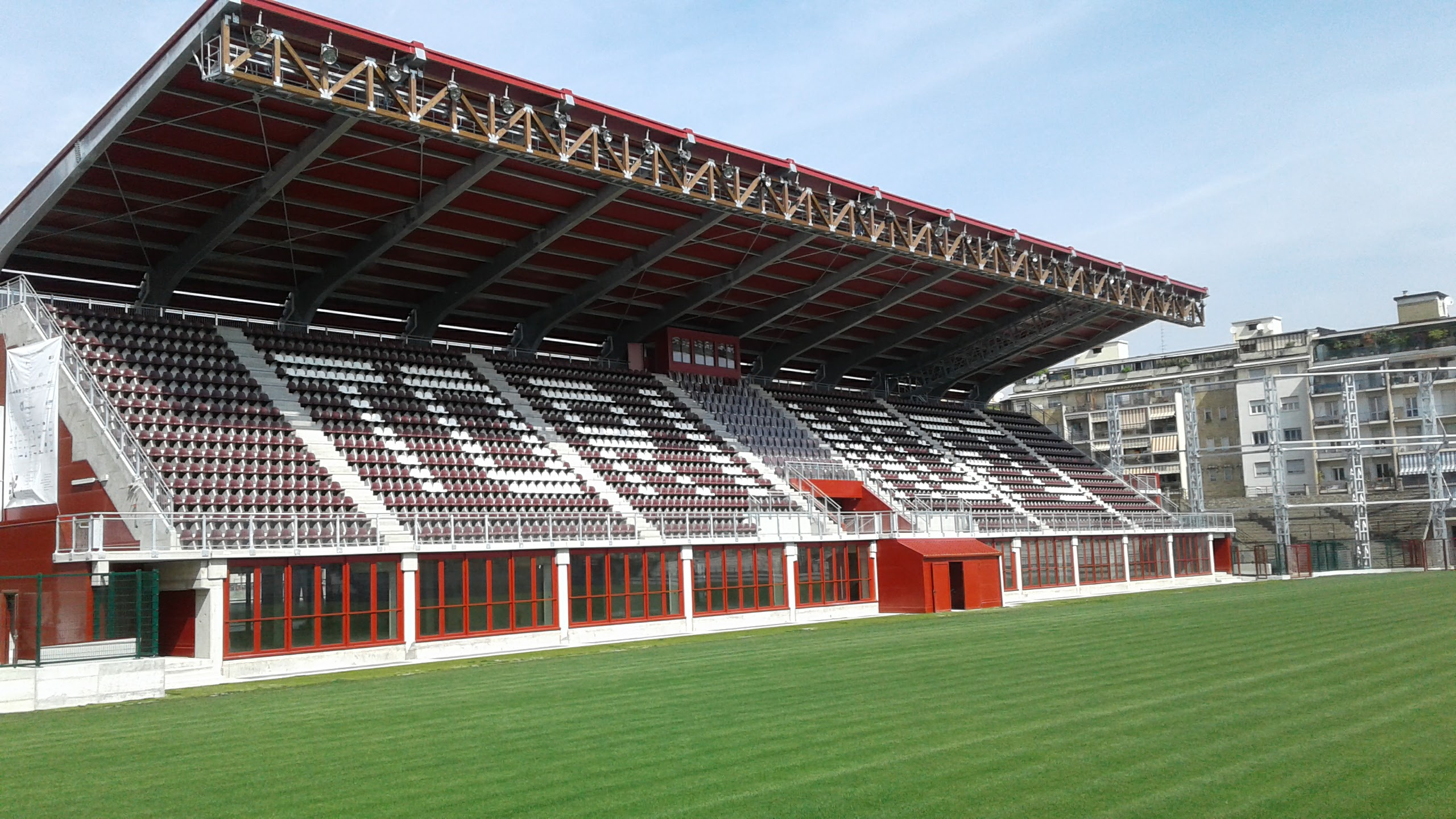
The grandstand of the new Stadio Filadelfia; on the right, the remains of the old stadium

From 11 October 1925 until the end of the 1925–26 season, Torino played their home games at Motovelodromo Corso Casale (now restored, it is dedicated to Fausto Coppi and also hosts American football matches), while awaiting their move to the Stadio Filadelfia. The "Fila" as it was known was heavily associated with the exploits of the Grande Torino team of the 1940s: opened on 17 October 1926 with a match against Fortitudo Roma, it hosted Torino's games continuously until 11 May 1958 (the final match being a 4–2 victory over Genoa). In the 1958–59 season, the club briefly moved to the Stadio Comunale: the move was short-lived however, as the club was relegated to Serie B that year, and returned to the Filadelfia out of superstition.

Torino played the entirety of the 1959–60 season and the next at the Filadelfia, but in 1961–62 and 1962–63 the club began to use the Comunale for "special" matches. The move to the Comunale, a stadium with a standing capacity of 65,000, was completed in 1963–64, and Torino remained there until 27 May 1990 when the stadium was abandoned in favour of the Stadio delle Alpi.

Built specifically for the 1990 FIFA World Cup, the Stadio delle Alpi was home to Torino from 1990 to 2006. Following the reconstruction carried out to make the stadium suitable to host the 2006 Winter Olympics opening ceremony and closing ceremony, Torino returned to the Stadio Comunale, renamed the Stadio Olimpico. The new capacity was now 27,958 seated, reduced by about 38,000 from the original in compliance with modern safety standards. In April 2016, the Olimpico was renamed in honour of the Grande Torino.

The Stadio Filadelfia also served as the training ground of Torino from 1926 to 1993. More recently, from 2006 to 2017, the team's training base was the Sisport di Corso Unione Sovietica. In the 2017–18 season, Torino returned to training at the reconstructed Filadelfia.

== Players ==
=== Current squad ===
As of 5 September 2026

Note: Flags indicate national team as defined under FIFA eligibility rules; some limited exceptions apply. Players may hold more than one non-FIFA nationality.

No.	Pos.	Nation	Player
2	DF	SCO	Nathan Patterson
3	DF	ITA	Cristiano Biraghi
5	DF	SUI	Eray Cömert
6	MF	TUR	Emirhan İlkhan
7	FW	MAR	Zakaria Aboukhlal
8	MF	ITA	Rolando Mandragora
9	FW	ITA	Pietro Pellegri
10	MF	CRO	Nikola Vlašić (vice-captain)
11	FW	ITA	Gaetano Oristanio (on loan from Venezia)
13	DF	SUI	Ricardo Rodriguez
15	DF	ITA	Pietro Comuzzo (on loan from Fiorentina)
17	FW	CRO	Sandro Kulenović
18	FW	ARG	Giovanni Simeone
19	FW	SCO	Ché Adams
20	GK	BRA	Lucas Perri (on loan from Leeds United)

No.	Pos.	Nation	Player
21	MF	POR	Daniel Bragança (on loan from Sporting CP)
22	MF	ITA	Cesare Casadei
23	DF	GEQ	Saúl Coco
26	GK	ITA	Diego Mascardi
28	MF	NED	Kian Fitz-Jim
29	DF	ITA	Niccolò Fortini (on loan from Fiorentina)
44	DF	ALB	Ardian Ismajli
45	DF	ALG	Rafik Belghali
66	MF	LTU	Gvidas Gineitis
76	GK	ITA	Lapo Siviero
77	MF	ITA	Alessio Cacciamani
79	MF	ITA	Andrea Luongo
81	GK	URU	Franco Israel
91	FW	COL	Duván Zapata (captain)

=== Torino Primavera ===
As of 4 September 2026

Note: Flags indicate national team as defined under FIFA eligibility rules; some limited exceptions apply. Players may hold more than one non-FIFA nationality.

No.	Pos.	Nation	Player
63	DF	ESP	Manuel Carrascosa
94	MF	HUN	Zalán Kugyela

=== Out on loan ===
As of 5 September 2026

Note: Flags indicate national team as defined under FIFA eligibility rules; some limited exceptions apply. Players may hold more than one non-FIFA nationality.

No.	Pos.	Nation	Player
—	GK	ITA	Matteo Brezzo (at Chisola until 30 June 2027)
—	DF	FRA	Côme Bianay Balcot (at Red Star until 30 June 2027)
—	DF	ITA	Alessandro Dellavalle (at Padova until 30 June 2027)
—	DF	FRA	Ali Dembélé (at Lecce until 30 June 2027)
—	DF	IRL	Senan Mullen (at Bohemians until 31 December 2026)
—	DF	ITA	Mattia Pellini (at Südtirol until 30 June 2027)
—	MF	ITA	Wisdom Acquah (at Modena until 30 June 2027)
—	MF	ENG	Tino Anjorin (at Göztepe until 30 June 2027)
—	MF	ITA	Aaron Ciammaglichella (at Pro Vercelli until 30 June 2027)

No.	Pos.	Nation	Player
—	MF	ITA	Marco Dalla Vecchia (at Cesena until 30 June 2027)
—	MF	ITA	Tommaso Di Marco (at Catania until 30 June 2027)
—	MF	SRB	Ivan Ilić (at Lecce until 30 June 2027)
—	MF	MDA	Sergiu Perciun (at Ascoli until 30 June 2027)
—	MF	BRA	Jonathan Silva (at Mantova until 30 June 2027)
—	FW	ITA	Tommaso Gabellini (at Forlì until 30 June 2027)
—	FW	SWE	Alieu Njie (at Fiorentina until 30 June 2027)
—	FW	ITA	Cristian Padula (at Audace Cerignola until 30 June 2027)

== Notable players ==
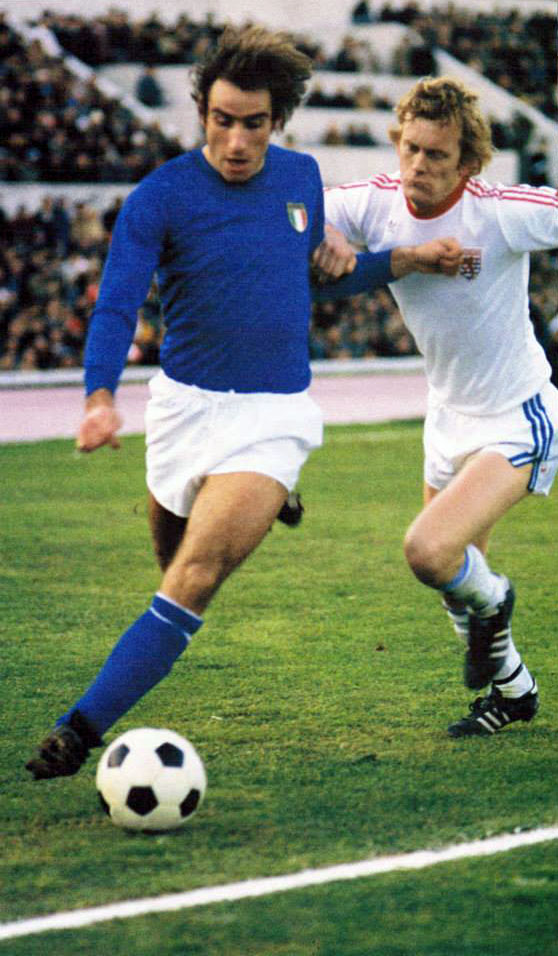
Francesco Graziani

FIFA World Cup winners

- (Italy) Giuseppe Dossena (1982)
- (Italy) Franco Selvaggi (1982)

UEFA European Championship winners

- (Italy) Giorgio Ferrini (1968)
- (Italy) Lido Vieri (1968)
- (Italy) Andrea Belotti (2020)
- (Italy) Salvatore Sirigu (2020)

=== Torino and the Italy national team ===
Among the players of Torino to win international honours with the Italy national football team are Adolfo Baloncieri, Antonio Janni, Julio Libonatti and Gino Rossetti, all winners with Italy at the Central European International Cup 1927–30, and who (with exception of Libonatti) also won bronze medals at the 1928 Summer Olympics. Subsequently, Lido Vieri and Giorgio Ferrini were victorious at the 1968 European Championship with the Azzurri, whilst Giuseppe Dossena won the FIFA World Cup in 1982.

On 11 May 1947, during a friendly match between Italy and Hungary that finished 3–2, Vittorio Pozzo fielded 10 players who were at Torino; this remains the largest number of Italian players fielded from the same club in the same match in the history of the Italy national team.

With 74 players having represented Italy throughout the club's existence, Torino is the fifth ranked Italian club for number of players capped by the Azzurri (sixth by number of total admissions). Francesco Graziani is the Torino player who has accumulated the most appearances (47) and goals (20) for Italy. On 11 June 2017, Andrea Belotti scored the hundredth goal of a Torino player in an Azzurri shirt, during a 2018 FIFA World Cup qualification match against Liechtenstein.

== Youth system ==
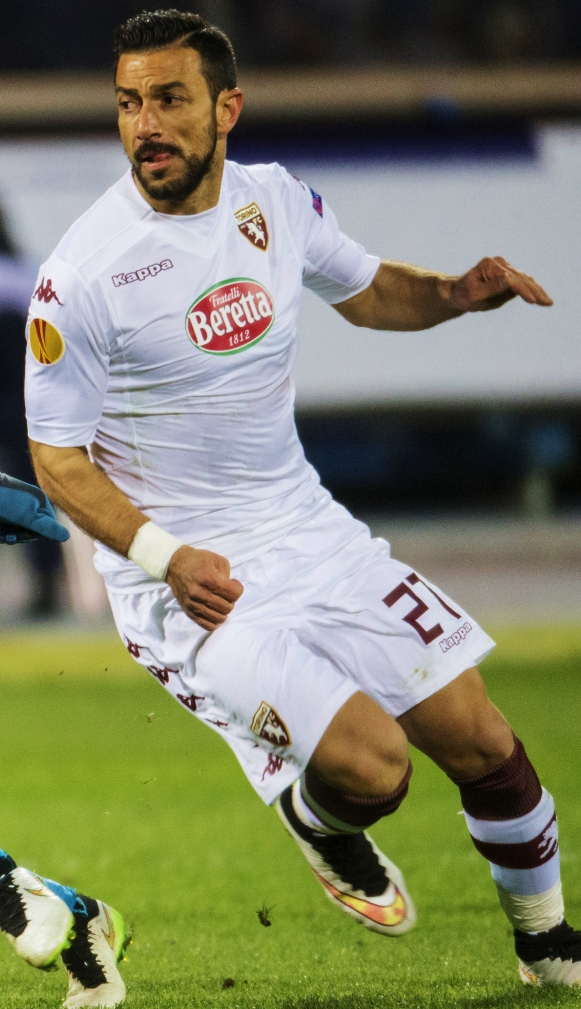
Fabio Quagliarella, product of the Torino youth system

The Torino youth system is formed of four men's teams that participate in separate national leagues (Primavera, Beretti, Allievi Nazionali Serie A & B, and Allievi Nazionali Lega Pro) and three that participate at regional level (Giovanissimi Nazionali, Giovanissimi Regionali A & B). Torino was one of the first Italian clubs to adopt a youth system, organised as early as the 1930s and is considered one of the best in Italy.

Domestically, Torino hold the record for most championships won in both the Campionato Nazionale Primavera with nine titles, and the Campionato Nazionale Dante Berretti with 10 titles. In addition, they have won the Coppa Italia Primavera a record eight times, and the prestigious Torneo di Viareggio six times.

The players developed in the Torino youth system were previously nicknamed "Balon-Boys" in honour of Adolfo Baloncieri, the player and club icon who ended his Torino career in 1932. The Torino youth system has developed numerous renowned players, including actor and journalist Raf Vallone, who devoted himself to a career in the arts after his debut for the first team.

== Non-playing staff ==
=== Board of directors ===
Position	Name
President	(Italy) Urbano Cairo
Vice-president	(Italy) Giuseppe Cairo
Director-general	(Italy) Antonio Comi
Sporting director	(Italy) Gianluca Petrachi
Secretary general	(Italy) Andrea Bernardelli
Technical area collaborator	(Italy) Emiliano Moretti
Team manager	(Italy) Marco Pellegri

=== Staff ===
As of 9 July 2026

Position	Name
Head coach	(Italy) Ignazio Abate
Assistant coach	(Argentina) Gabriel Raimondi
Technical coach	(Argentina) Lucas Biglia
Technical coach	(Italy) Luigi Agnelli
Fitness coach	(Italy) Alessandro Micheli
Fitness coach	(Italy) Rocco Perrotta
Fitness coach	(Italy) Enrico Busolin
Goalkeeping coach	(Italy) Paolo Di Sarno
Goalkeeping coach	(Italy) Stefano Del Corno
Match analyst	(Italy) Dario Cucinotta
Head of the medical sector	(Italy) Paolo Gola
First team doctor	(Italy) Corrado Bertolo
First team doctor	(Italy) Antonio Italia
Massophysiotherapist	(Italy) Dario D'Onofrio
Massophysiotherapist	(Italy) Francesco Smargiassi
Physiotherapist	(Brazil) Gustavo Simonassi
Physiotherapist	(Italy) Riccardo Levrini
Physiotherapist - Osteopath	(Italy) Massimiliano Greco
Physiotherapist - Osteopath	(Italy) Alessandro Pernice
Injury recovery	(Italy) Giuseppe Malizia
Personal trainer	(Italy) Tiberio Ancora
Podiatrist	(Italy) Michele De Felice
Kit manager	(Italy) Luca Finetto
Kit manager	(Italy) Angelo Ghiron
Kit manager	(Italy) Marco Pasin

=== Notable coaches ===
Name	From	To	Honours
(Hungary) Imre Schoffer	1926	1927	1926–27 Divisione Nazionale
(Austria) Tony Cargnelli	1927; 1934	1929; 1936	1927–28 Divisione Nazionale, 1935–36 Coppa Italia
(Hungary) András Kuttik (Kingdom of Italy) Antonio Janni	1942	1943	1942–43 Serie A, 1942–43 Coppa Italia
(Kingdom of Italy) Luigi Ferrero	1945	1947	1945–46 Serie A, 1946–47 Serie A
(Kingdom of Italy) Mario Sperone	1947	1948	1947–48 Serie A
(England) Leslie Lievesley (Italy) Oberdan Ussello	1948	1949	1948–49 Serie A
(Italy) Edmondo Fabbri	1967	1969	1967–68 Coppa Italia
(Italy) Giancarlo Cadé	1969	1971	1970–71 Coppa Italia
(Italy) Gustavo Giagnoni	1971	1974	
(Italy) Luigi Radice	1975; 1984	1980; 1989	1975–76 Serie A
(Italy) Emiliano Mondonico	1990; 1998	1994; 2000	1992–93 Coppa Italia, 1990–91 Mitropa Cup

== Supporters and rivalries ==
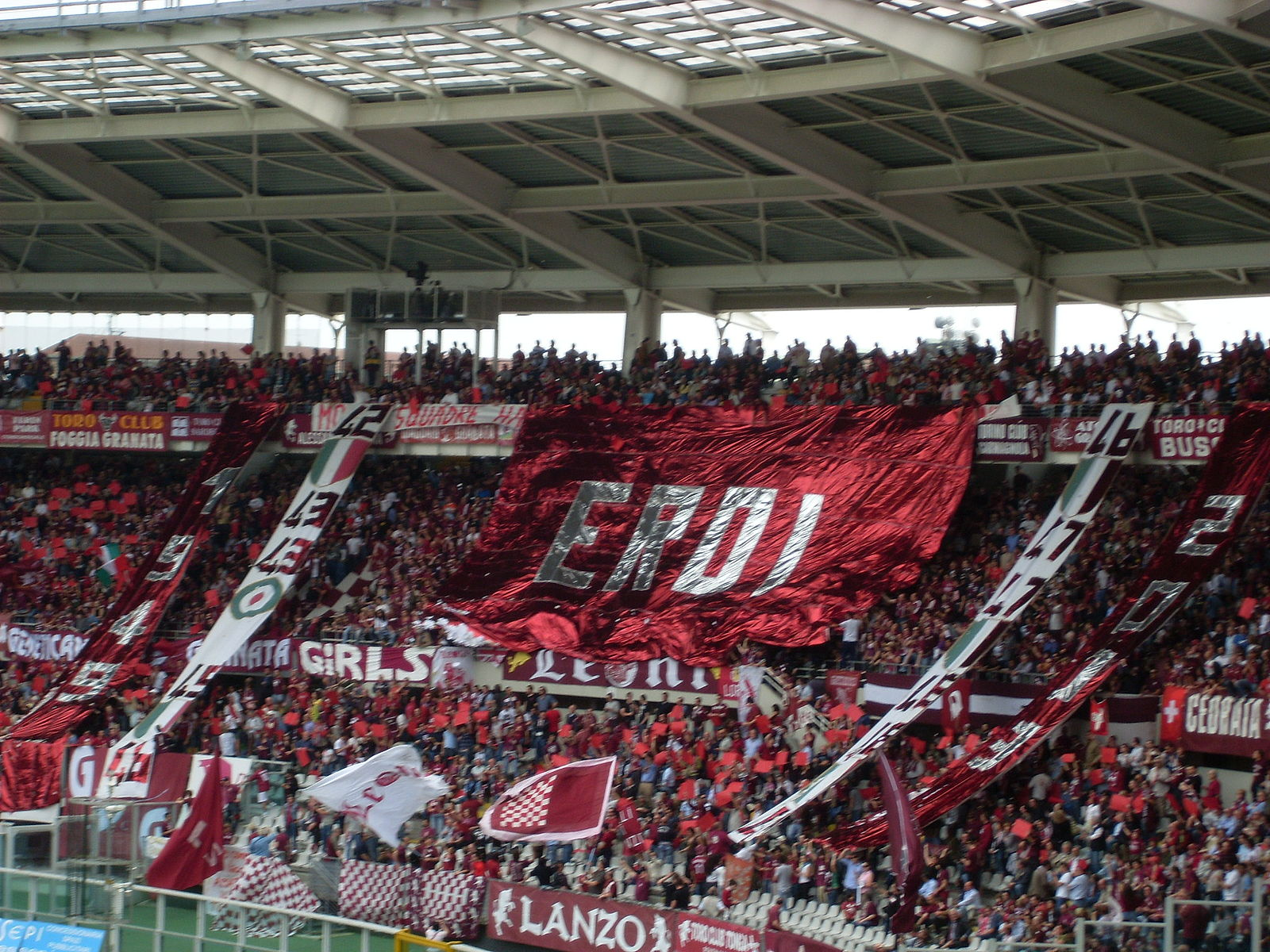
An image of the Torino fans

The fans of Torino hold a number of distinctions, including the first ever organised supporters group in Italy, the Fedelissimi Granata, founded in 1951. The fans also displayed the first banner of an organised club, at the Stadio Filadelfia, and organised the first away trip by plane in Italian football, in 1963, during a game against Roma. It was at the Filadelfia that Oreste Bolmida, the trumpeter fan made famous by the film Ora e per sempre also performed. In the 1970s the fans began to organise the club's first choreographies, which were used in commercials of French carmaker Renault in the subsequent decade. In 1979, the curva Maratona was awarded "the most beautiful stand of Europe" by French magazine Onze Mondial; an image of this section of the stadium was later featured on the cover of France Football on 21 December 1979.

The fans of Torino are "twinned" with the fans of Fiorentina. The link between the two sides was born in the early 1970s due to a common anti-Juventus sentiment and the closeness of the Viola after the Superga tragedy. Supporters of Torino are on good terms with the curva nord of Alessandria and curva sud of Nocerina.

Torino also has a friendship with Sociedade Esportiva Palmeiras, a club founded by Italian immigrants in São Paulo who were inspired by Italian clubs Torino and Pro Vercelli. After the Superga Air Disaster, Palmeiras organized a fundraiser to help the families of the players killed in the plane crash. The Brazillian club also sent condolences to the leaders of Torino and the Italian consul, as well as to the Italian football federation. To honour the Great Torino squad, Palmeiras has a banner of that team displayed in the club’s trophy room(this makes Torino the only non-Palmeiras club honoured in the room). Nowadays, both clubs regularly commemorate their connection on social media under the motto “Uniti per sempre”(United forever)

The Argentines of River Plate are historically twinned with Torino, since the time of the Superga disaster. In the period following the disaster, the Argentine club was very close to the Italian club, organising a friendly and fundraiser to help the devastated team. On 26 May 1949, River flew to Turin to play a friendly charity match organised by the FIGC, together with a selection that included the strongest Italian players of the era, gathered under the name of "Torino symbol". As a testimony to the relationship between the two clubs, the away jersey of the Argentine club has been maroon on several occasions (most recently, the 2005–06 season) while Torino have sported several variations of an away kit with a diagonal band, an homage to River's home kit. In addition, River Plate disputed the 1996 Intercontinental Cup against Juventus The bond with the Portuguese of Benfica is also very strong, the last to have met the Grande Torino before the aerial disaster of Superga. Other supporters with whom there is a friendship are supporters of English club Manchester City.

Torino's historical rivalries are with Sampdoria, Piacenza, Verona, Lazio, Perugia, Internazionale, Atalanta, Ternana and Ancona. Torino's friendship with Genoa turned negative as a result of Genoese festivities during the Torino–Genoa match on 24 May 2009 won by the Rossoblu; the result contributed to Torino's relegation to Serie B. On 16 December 2012, the day when the two clubs met for the first time after Torino's return to Serie A, clashes erupted between the two club's organised supporters. The rivalry with city rivals Juventus is the most heated, with the two teams taking part in the Derby della Mole, one of the most popular derbies in Italian football and the oldest still played.

== Honours ==
=== Domestic ===
==== League ====
- Italian Football Championship / Serie A
  - Winners (7): 1927–28, 1942–43, 1945–46, 1946–47, 1947–48, 1948–49, 1975–76^{1}
  - Runners-up (7): 1907, 1914–1915, 1928–1929, 1938–1939, 1941–42, 1976–77, 1984–85
- Serie B
  - Winners (3): 1959–60, 1989–90, 2000–01
  - Runners-up (2): 2004–05, 2011–12

==== Cups ====
- Coppa Italia
  - Winners (5): 1935–36, 1942–43, 1967–68, 1970–71, 1992–93
  - Runners-up (8): 1937–38, 1962–63, 1963–64, 1969–70, 1979–80, 1980–81, 1981–82, 1987–88
- Supercoppa Italiana
  - Runners-up (1): 1993

=== European ===
- Mitropa Cup
  - Winners (1): 1991
- UEFA Cup
  - Runners-up (1): 1991–92

=== Others ===
- Torneo Internazionale Stampa Sportiva:
  - Runners-up (1): 1908
- Anglo-Italian League Cup
  - Runners-up (1): 1971

=== Friendly ===
- Eusébio Cup
  - Winners (1): 2016
- Amsterdam Tournament:
  - Runners-up (1): 1987
- Torneo Interfederale Coppa Torino:
  - Runners-up (1): 1910

Notes:
^1 Torino won the title in the 1926–27 season, but it was later revoked.

== Statistics and records ==
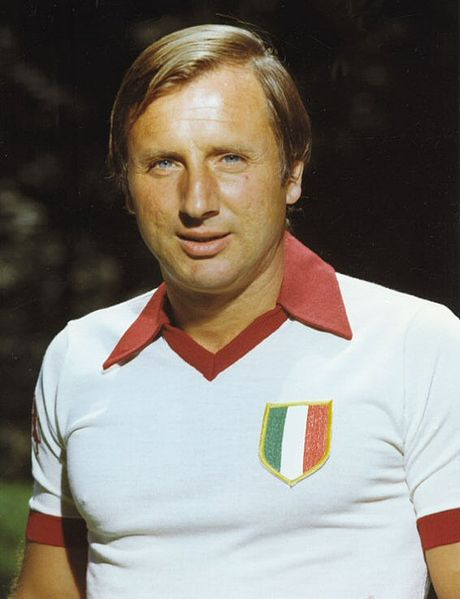
Giorgio Ferrini

Torino is in 8th place in the Serie A all-time standings, which takes account of all the football teams that have played in the top flight at least once.

In the Italian league, the team has finished in first place on eight occasions, although the club has only won seven championship titles, seven times in second place and nine times in third place. In 100 seasons, including 18 in various championships that preluded the single round format (Torino withdrew in 1908 and the 1915–16 Coppa Federale is not recognised), 73 in Serie A and 12 in Serie B, the club has finished on the podium in 23% of cases.

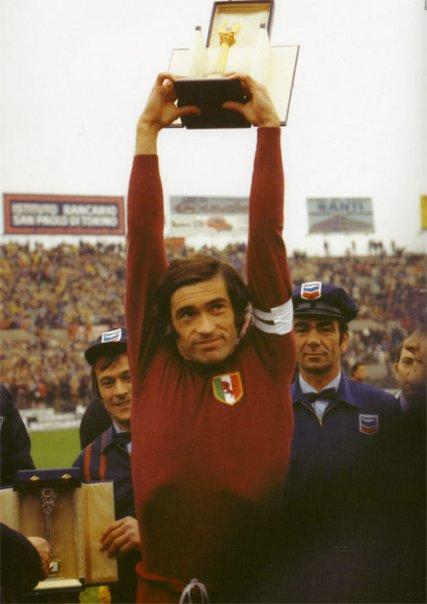
Paolo Pulici

In the 2006–07 season, Torino, for the first time in history played at a level higher than Juventus: while the Granata competed in Serie A, Juventus took part in Serie B following the aftermath of the Calciopoli scandal.

Giorgio Ferrini holds the club's official appearance record with 566 appearances (plus 56 goals) accumulated between 1959 and 1975. The record for the most goals scored is held by Paolo Pulici, with 172 official goals (in 437 appearances) between 1967 and 1982.

Eight different Torino players have won the Capocannoniere award for league top scorer in the Italian top flight: the first was the Austrian Heinrich Schönfeld with 22 goals in 1923–24. He was followed by the Italian Argentine Julio Libonatti, who scored 35 goals in 1927–28 and Gino Rossetti (36) in 1928–29. Rossetti's tally of 36 goals remains the highest number of goals ever scored to win the award. Eusebio Castigliano was the leading scorer (13) of the first season after the Second World War (1945–46), followed by Valentino Mazzola in 1946–47 (29). Torino would have to wait almost 30 years before another league top scorer emerged, namely when Paolo Pulici broke his low-scoring streak in the mid-1970s and won the award in 1972–73 (17), 1974–75 (18) and 1975–76 (21). After almost 40 years without a top-scorer from Torino, Ciro Immobile (22) established himself as the league's top scorer in 2013–14.

Most appearances
Rank	Player	Nationality	Appearances
1	Giorgio Ferrini	(Italy)	566
2	Paolo Pulici	(Italy)	437
3	Renato Zaccarelli	(Italy)	413
4	Claudio Sala	(Italy)	360
5	Lido Vieri	(Italy)	357
6	Cesare Martin	(Kingdom of Italy)	345
7	Luigi Danova	(Kingdom of Italy)	340
8	Natalino Fossati	(Italy)	336
9	Antonio Janni	(Kingdom of Italy)	330
10	Giorgio Puia	(Italy)	326

Top goalscorers
Rank	Player	Nationality	Goals
1	Paolo Pulici	(Italy)	172
2	Julio Libonatti	(Kingdom of Italy)	157
3	Gino Rossetti	(Kingdom of Italy)	144
4	Guglielmo Gabetto	(Italy)	127
5	Marco Ferrante	(Italy)	125
6	Valentino Mazzola	(Italy)	123
7	Francesco Graziani	(Italy)	122
8	Andrea Belotti	(Italy)	113
9	Adolfo Baloncieri	(Kingdom of Italy)	100
10	Franco Ossola	(Italy)	85

=== Divisional movements ===
Series	Years	Last	Promotions	Relegations
A	81	2024–25	–	▼6 (1959, 1989, 1996, 2000, 2003, 2009)
B	12	2011–12	▲6 (1960, 1990, 1999, 2001, 2006, 2012)	never
93 years of professional football in Italy since 1929
Founding member of the Football League’s First Division in 1921

== Kit suppliers and shirt sponsors ==
Period	Kit manufacturer	Shirt sponsor (main)	Shirt sponsor (secondary)	Shirt sponsor (back)	Shirt sponsor (sleeve)	Shorts sponsor
1906–1974	In-house	None	None	None	None	None
1974–1979	Umbro	None	None	None	None	None
1979–1981	Superga	None	None	None	None	None
1981–1982	Superga	Barbero Vinicola	None	None	None	None
1982–1983	Tiko Sport	Barbero Vinicola	None	None	None	None
1983–1984	Tiko Sport	Ariostea	None	None	None	None
1984–1988	Adidas	Sweda Italia	None	None	None	None
1988–1990	Adidas	Indesit	None	None	None	None
1990–1991	ABM	Indesit	None	None	None	None
1991–1993	ABM	Fratelli Beretta	None	None	None	None
1993–1994	Lotto	Fratelli Beretta	None	None	None	None
1994–1995	Lotto	Bongioanni Caldaie	None	None	None	None
1995–1996	Lotto	SDA Courier	None	None	None	None
1996–2000	Kelme	SDA Courier	None	None	None	None
2000–2001	Kelme	Directa SIM	None	None	None	None
2001–2002	Asics	Conto Arancio	None	None	None	None
2002–2003	Asics	Ixfin	None	None	None	None
2003–2005	Asics	Bavaria	None	None	None	None
2005–2006	Asics	MG.K Vis (Matchday 3–4) / Il Buon Riso (5-7 & 9) / Professionecasa (1 & 8) / Dipiù (10) / Reale Mutua (11–42)	Dipiù (Matchday 8) / Fratelli Beretta (2-3 & 9-42)	None	None	None
2006–2008	Asics	Reale Mutua	Fratelli Beretta	None	None	None
2008–2009	Kappa	Movida Pile (Matchday 1) / MG.K Vis (2) / Renault Trucks (3-38)	Reale Mutua	None	None	None
2009–2010	Kappa	MG.K Vis (Matchday 1–3) / Il Buon Riso (4–5) / Firma Il Buon Riso (6) / Italporte (7, 12, 17-42 & Playoffs) / Dolmar (8–9) / Acqua Maniva (10) / Škoda Yeti (11, 13, 16) / Be-Total Body Plus (14–15)	Dahlia TV (Matchday 8-42 & Playoffs)	None	None	MG.K Vis
2010–2011	Kappa	Italporte	Dahlia TV (Matchday 1-29) / Fratelli Beretta (30–31)	None	None	MG.K Vis
2011–2012	Kappa	Acqua Valmora	Aruba	None	None	None
2012–2013	Kappa	Fratelli Beretta	Aruba	None	None	None
2013–2014	Kappa	Fratelli Beretta	Suzuki	None	None	None
2014–2015	Kappa	Fratelli Beretta	Suzuki	Tecnoalarm	None	None
2015–2017	Kappa	Suzuki	Fratelli Beretta	Tecnoalarm	None	None
2017–2018	Kappa	Suzuki	Fratelli Beretta	SportPesa	None	None
2018–2019	Kappa	Suzuki	Fratelli Beretta	SportPesa	Wüber N38	None
2019–2023	Joma	Suzuki	Fratelli Beretta	EdiliziAcrobatica	Wüber N38	None
2023–	Joma	Suzuki	Fratelli Beretta	EdiliziAcrobatica	JD Sports	None

== See also ==
- Dynasties in Italian football
- Allemandi Case
