= Bowang, Ma'anshan =

Bowang 博望区
- District
- Interactive map of Bowang
- Coordinates: 31.56°N 118.84°E
- Country: China
- Province: Anhui
- Prefecture-level city: Ma'anshan
- Established: September 2012
- District seat: Bowang Town

Area
  - Total: 351 km^{2} (136 sq mi)

Population (2020)
  - Total: 158,483
  - Density: 452/km^{2} (1,170/sq mi)
- Time zone: UTC+8 (China Standard Time)
- Postal Code: 243131

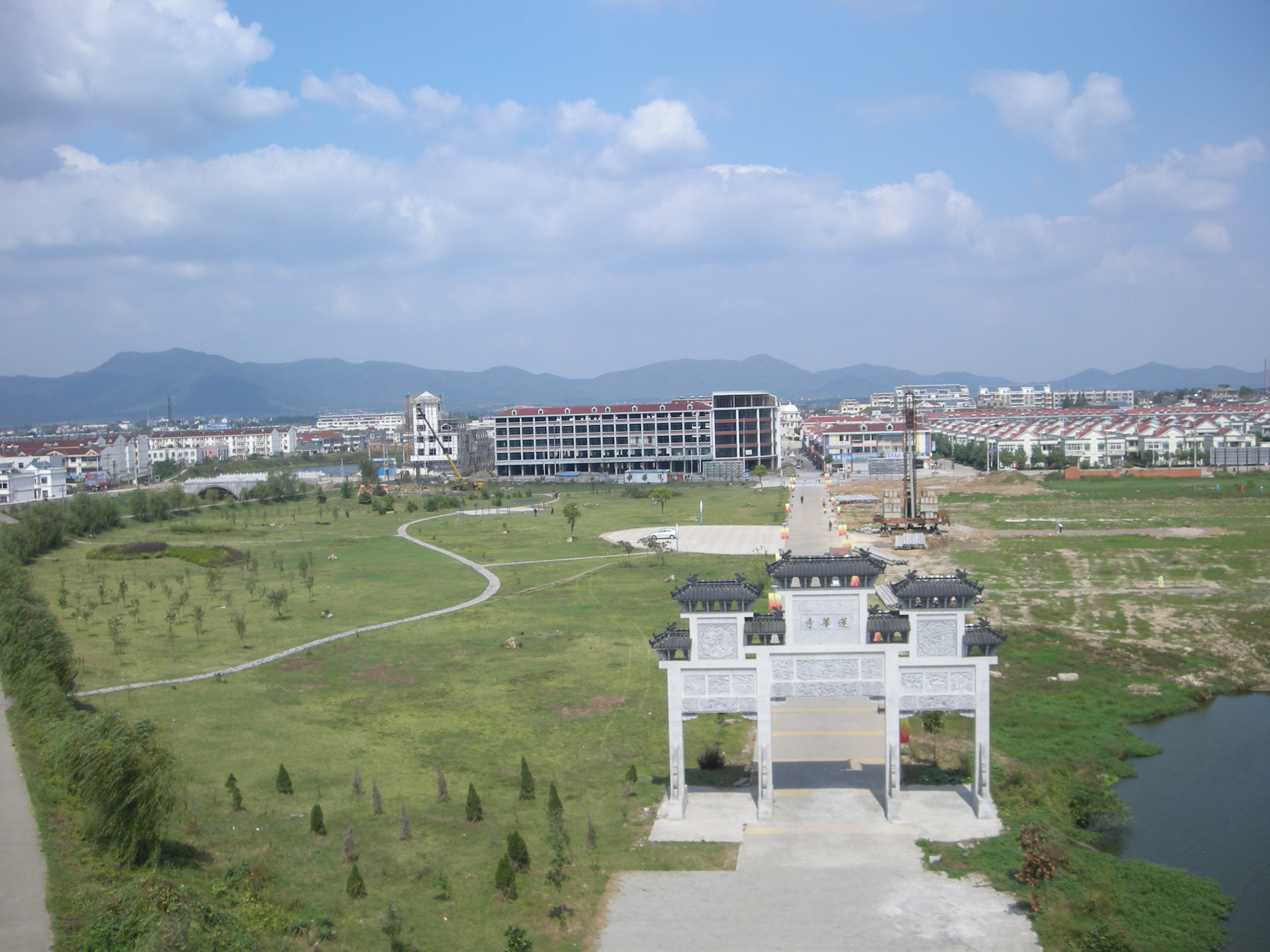
Bowang Town

Bowang District (Chinese: 博望区; pinyin: Bówàng Qū) is a district of the prefecture-level city of Ma'anshan in eastern Anhui province, China. It was created in September 2012 by splitting off the three towns of Bowang, Danyang, and Xinshi from Dangtu County. It governs an area of 351 square kilometres (136 sq mi) and has a total population of 183,500.

== Administrative divisions ==
Bowang District is divided into three towns: Bowang Town (博望镇), Danyang Town (丹阳镇), and Xinshi Town (新市镇), which are further divided into 3 neighbourhood committees, 3 communities, and 37 villages.
