= Ma'anshan Yangtze River Bridge =

Ma'anshan Yangtze River Bridge 马鞍山长江大桥
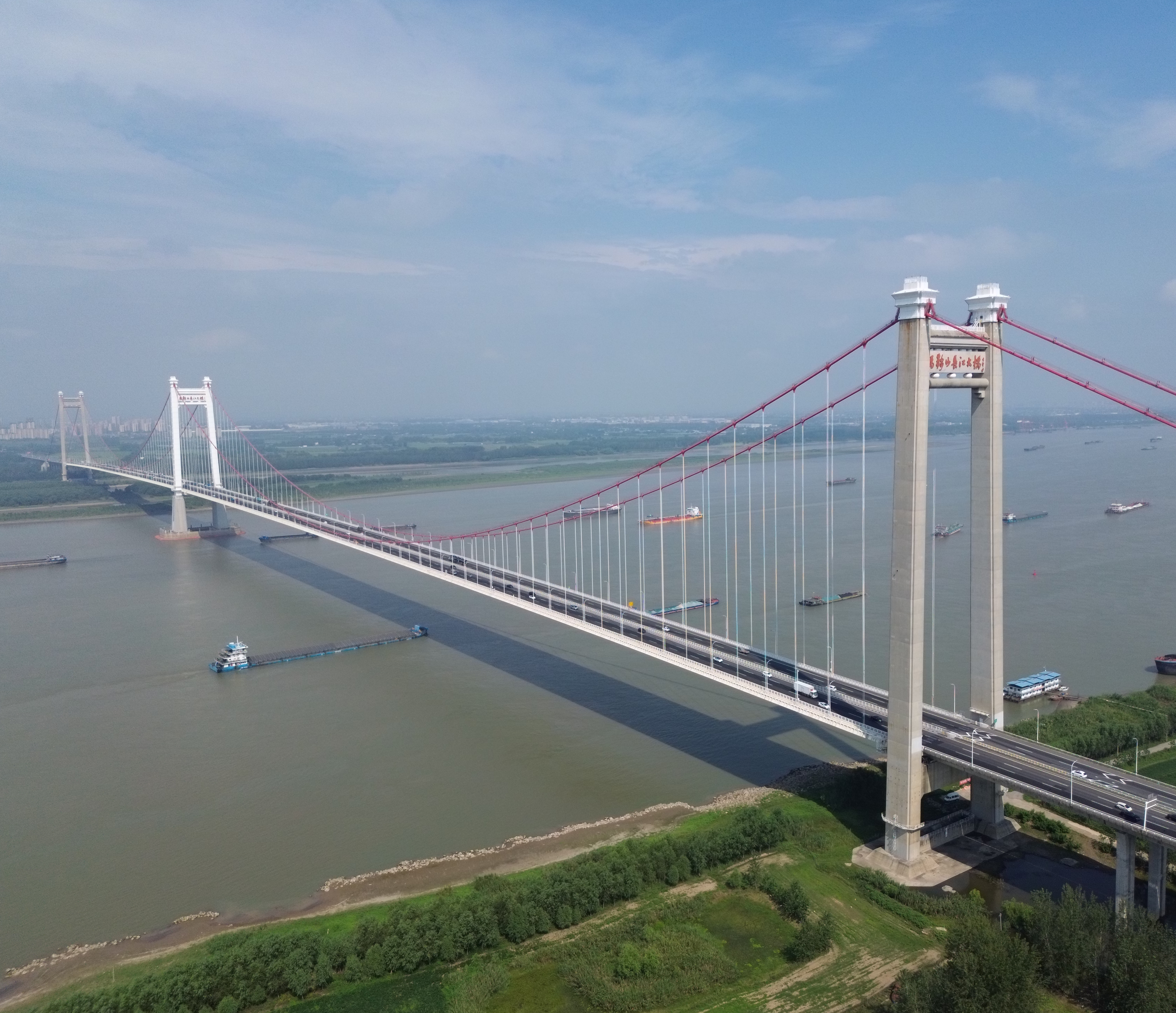
- Coordinates: 31°36′50″N 118°23′35″E
- Carries: six lanes of Hefei-Chaohu-Maanshan Expressway
- Locale: Ma'anshan, Anhui

Characteristics
- Design: left stream bridge: suspension right stream bridge: cable-stayed
- Total length: 11.209 km (6.965 mi)
- Height: middle tower: 178.8 m (587 ft)
- Longest span: left stream bridge: 1,080 m (3,540 ft) x2 right stream bridge:260 m (850 ft) x2

History
- Construction start: December 28, 2008
- Opened: December 31, 2013

Location
- Interactive map of Ma'anshan Yangtze River Bridge

The Ma'anshan Yangtze River Bridge is a bridge complex over the Yangtze River in Ma'anshan, Anhui Province in eastern China. The bridge complex carries a six-lane highway over two branch streams of the Yangtze and the island of Xiaohuangzhou in the middle of the river.

The entire bridge complex is 11.209 km (6.965 mi) in length. The bridge over the left stream is a suspension bridge with three towers and two 1,080 m (3,540 ft) spans. This section is tied with the Taizhou Yangtze River Bridge as the longest double span suspension bridge in the world. The bridge over the right stream is a cable-stayed bridge with three towers and two 260 m (850 ft).

The deck height of the left stream bridge is 32 m (105 ft), while the deck height of the right stream bridge is 18 m (59 ft) high.

The bridge project was approved in July 2004. The bridge opened on December 31, 2013.

== See also ==
- Ma'anshan Yangtze River Rail-Road Bridge
- Bridges and tunnels across the Yangtze River
- List of bridges in China
- List of longest suspension bridge spans
- List of tallest bridges in the world
