= Tiberio Ancora =

Italian association football player

Personal information
- Date of birth: 30 October 1965 (age 60)
- Place of birth: Italy
- Position: Defender

Senior career*
Years	Team	Apps	(Gls)
–1988	Ostuni Sport		
1989	Virtus Matino		
1990–1992	Messina	23	(0)
1990	→ Monopoli 1966 (loan)	20	(0)
1994	Club Africain		
1994	Nardò		
1995	Casertana		
1996–1997	Nardò		
1998	Atletico Tricase	25	(0)
1999–2000	Martina		
2001	Brindisi		
- * Club domestic league appearances and goals

Tiberio Ancora (born 30 October 1965 in Italy) is an Italian retired footballer.
