= Dangtu County =

Dangtu 当涂县 Tangtu
- County
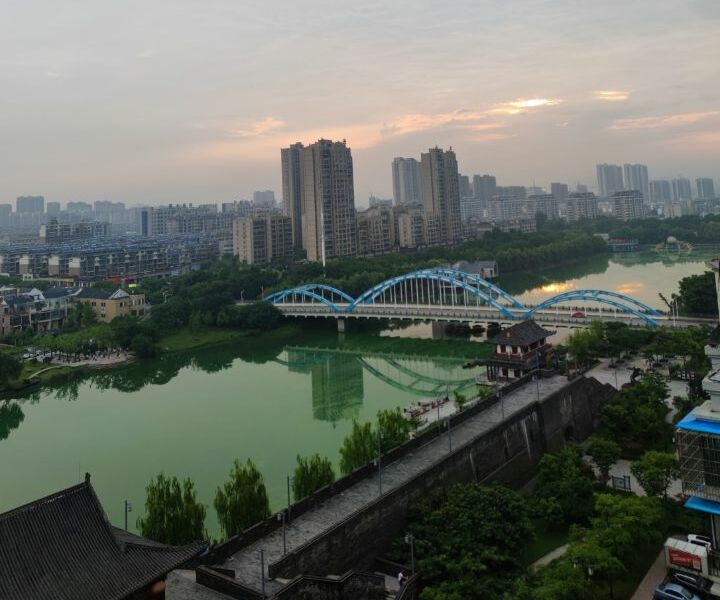
- Interactive map of Dangtu
- Coordinates: 31°34′16″N 118°29′53″E
- Country: China
- Province: Anhui
- Prefecture-level city: Ma'anshan
- County seat: Gushu

Area
  - Total: 1,002 km^{2} (387 sq mi)

Population (2020)
  - Total: 446,991
  - Density: 446.1/km^{2} (1,155/sq mi)
- Time zone: UTC+8 (CST)
- Postal code: 243100

Dangtu County (simplified Chinese: 当涂县; traditional Chinese: 當涂縣; pinyin: Dāngtú Xiàn) is one of three counties under the jurisdiction of the prefecture-level city of Ma'anshan in the southeast of Anhui Province, China.

Dangtu is one of the longest established counties in eastern China and formed part of the Taiping Prefecture during the Ming and Qing dynasties.

In September 2012, three towns of Bowang, Danyang, and Xinshi from Dangtu County were split to form Bowang District.

== Geography ==
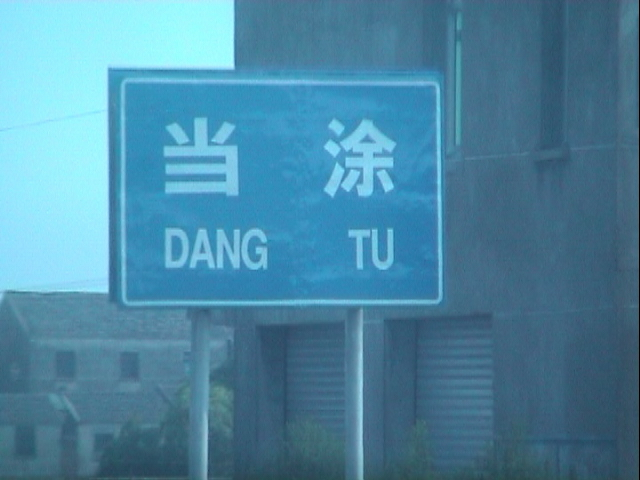
County entrance sign

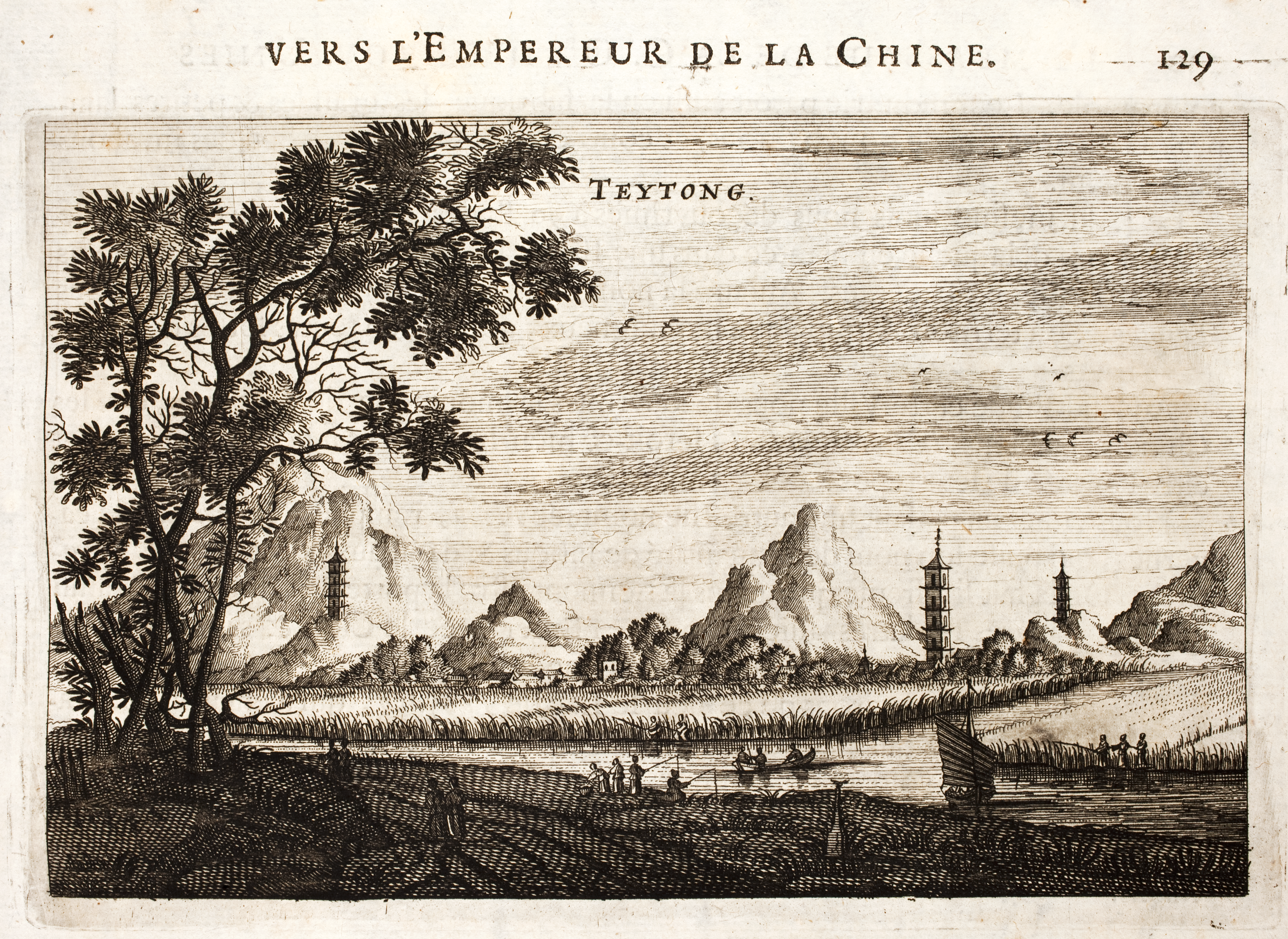
"Teytong" (Dangtu). Nieuhof: L'ambassade de la Compagnie Orientale des Provinces Unies vers l'Empereur de la Chine, 1665

The county is situated immediately south of the Ma'anshan urban core, and its northern built-up region is effectively a suburb of the greater Ma'anshan area. It is situated on the eastern (right) bank of the Yangtze River and western shore of Shijiu Lake; it borders Jiangsu Province to the east and the prefecture-level city of Wuhu to the southwest. Its southern half is still largely rural.

== Climate ==
Climate data for Dangtu, elevation 60 m (200 ft), (1991–2020 normals, extremes 1981–present)
Month	Jan	Feb	Mar	Apr	May	Jun	Jul	Aug	Sep	Oct	Nov	Dec	Year
Record high °C (°F)	20.6 (69.1)	28.1 (82.6)	34.3 (93.7)	33.6 (92.5)	35.6 (96.1)	37.3 (99.1)	38.4 (101.1)	39.7 (103.5)	37.7 (99.9)	33.2 (91.8)	28.7 (83.7)	21.5 (70.7)	39.7 (103.5)
Mean daily maximum °C (°F)	7.5 (45.5)	10.3 (50.5)	15.2 (59.4)	21.5 (70.7)	26.8 (80.2)	29.3 (84.7)	32.6 (90.7)	32.1 (89.8)	28.1 (82.6)	23.0 (73.4)	16.6 (61.9)	10.1 (50.2)	21.1 (70.0)
Daily mean °C (°F)	3.5 (38.3)	5.9 (42.6)	10.4 (50.7)	16.5 (61.7)	21.8 (71.2)	25.2 (77.4)	28.6 (83.5)	28.0 (82.4)	23.8 (74.8)	18.2 (64.8)	11.9 (53.4)	5.8 (42.4)	16.6 (61.9)
Mean daily minimum °C (°F)	0.4 (32.7)	2.5 (36.5)	6.6 (43.9)	12.2 (54.0)	17.6 (63.7)	21.8 (71.2)	25.4 (77.7)	24.9 (76.8)	20.4 (68.7)	14.5 (58.1)	8.3 (46.9)	2.5 (36.5)	13.1 (55.6)
Record low °C (°F)	−10.4 (13.3)	−10.4 (13.3)	−4.0 (24.8)	1.0 (33.8)	7.4 (45.3)	13.2 (55.8)	19.0 (66.2)	16.9 (62.4)	12.1 (53.8)	2.0 (35.6)	−4.1 (24.6)	−12.2 (10.0)	−12.2 (10.0)
Average precipitation mm (inches)	55.3 (2.18)	61.8 (2.43)	89.5 (3.52)	93.1 (3.67)	99.0 (3.90)	190.2 (7.49)	193.0 (7.60)	133.2 (5.24)	79.3 (3.12)	50.9 (2.00)	55.6 (2.19)	38.9 (1.53)	1,139.8 (44.87)
Average precipitation days (≥ 0.1 mm)	10.5	10.1	11.7	11.0	11.0	11.4	12.0	11.5	8.4	8.0	8.4	7.8	121.8
Average snowy days	4.0	2.4	0.8	0	0	0	0	0	0	0	0.3	1.0	8.5
Average relative humidity (%)	75	75	71	71	71	77	79	79	77	74	75	73	75
Mean monthly sunshine hours	112.7	115.4	156.5	178.1	187.2	161.4	207.6	198.4	160.0	157.5	137.1	134.7	1,906.6
Percentage possible sunshine	35	37	42	46	44	38	48	49	44	45	44	43	43
Source: China Meteorological Administration

== Administrative divisions ==
Dangtu County is divided into 10 towns and 1 township.

Towns

- Gushu (姑孰镇)
- Huangchi (黄池镇)
- Wuxi (乌溪镇)
- Shiqiao (石桥镇)
- Tangnan (塘南镇)
- Huhe (护河镇)
- Taibai (太白镇)
- Niandou (年陡镇)
- Huyang (湖阳镇)
- Dalong (大陇镇)

Township

- Jiangxin Township (江心乡)

== Demographics ==
According to the Sixth National Census, the county has a total population of about 410,000. The main urban center of Dangtu County is home to approximately 220,000 residents.

== Culture ==
Dangtu County has a long history of more than 2000 years as a county. It was called Danyang (丹阳) in the Qin dynasty but during the Sui dynasty, the county became known as "Dangtu" (当涂). A famous poet named Xie Tiao (谢朓) once praised Dangtu County as the place of beautiful mountains and rivers. Li Bai had come to Dangtu seven times and his uncle was the former governor of Dangtu County. There is a memorial to the famous Chinese poet, Li Bai (aka Li Po c. 700–762), who is said to have drowned at Dangtu after attempting to embrace the reflection of the moon. Dangtu people have a sense of familiarity with many of the poems Li Bai wrote because the beautiful scenery he described in his poems are the actual places where the local people have lived all of their lives.

== Economy ==
Dangtu County, which borders the municipality of Nanjing in Jiangsu, is a relatively prosperous county, with a 2015 GDP per capita of approximately $6,000 (US). Its factories produce bricks, candles, electric lamps, and soap. Its major exports are frozen meat, textiles, leather and plastic products. Industry occupies about 60% of the Dangtu economy, with services generating 20% of economic output.
