= Shijiu Lake =

Lake in eastern China's Anhui and Jiangsu provinces

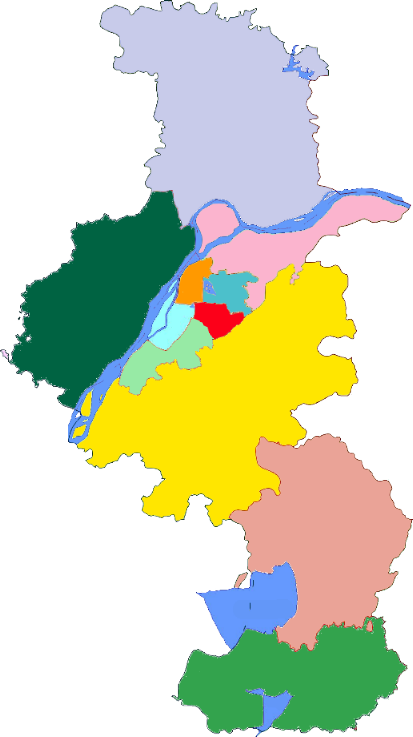
- Location in Nanjing Shijiu Lake (Jiangsu)
- Location: Dangtu County, Anhui; Gaochun District, Nanjing, Jiangsu; Lishui District, Nanjing, Jiangsu
- Coordinates: 31°28′19″N 118°52′22″E
- Type: Fresh water lake
- Catchment area: 18,600 km^{2} (7,200 sq mi)
- Basin countries: China
- Max. length: 23 km (14 mi)
- Max. width: 15.5 km (10 mi)
- Surface area: 210.4 km^{2} (100 sq mi)
- Average depth: 4.08 m (13 ft)
- Max. depth: 5.25 m (17 ft)
- Water volume: 858×10^{6} m^{3} (30.3×10^{9} cu ft)
- Surface elevation: 9.3 m (31 ft)

Shijiu Lake (Chinese: 石臼湖; pinyin: Shíjiù Hú) is a freshwater lake in eastern China, situated at the lower reaches of the Yangtze River. One half of the lake that is to the west, belongs to the Dangtu County of Anhui Province and the other part lies in the Gaochun and Lishui Districts of Nanjing, Jiangsu Province.

The area of the watershed is 18,600 square kilometres (7,200 sq mi), with an elevation of 9.3 metres (31 ft), its length is 23 kilometres (14 mi) and the greatest breadth from east to west is 15.5 kilometres (10 mi) (the average breadth makes 9.15 kilometres (6 mi)). The surface is equal to 2210.4 square kilometres (100 sq mi), and volume is about 858 million cubic metres (30.3×10^{9} cu ft). The maximum depth of the Shijiu Lake is 5.25 metres (17 ft), and the average depth is 4.08 metres (13 ft).
