= Yushan, Ma'anshan =

Yushan 雨山区
- District
- Interactive map of Yushan
- Coordinates: 31°40′43″N 118°29′29″E
- Country: China
- Province: Anhui
- Prefecture-level city: Ma'anshan
- District seat: Yushan Subdistrict

Area
  - Total: 173 km^{2} (67 sq mi)

Population (2020)
  - Total: 355,986
  - Density: 2,060/km^{2} (5,330/sq mi)
- Time zone: UTC+8 (China Standard)
- Postal code: 243000

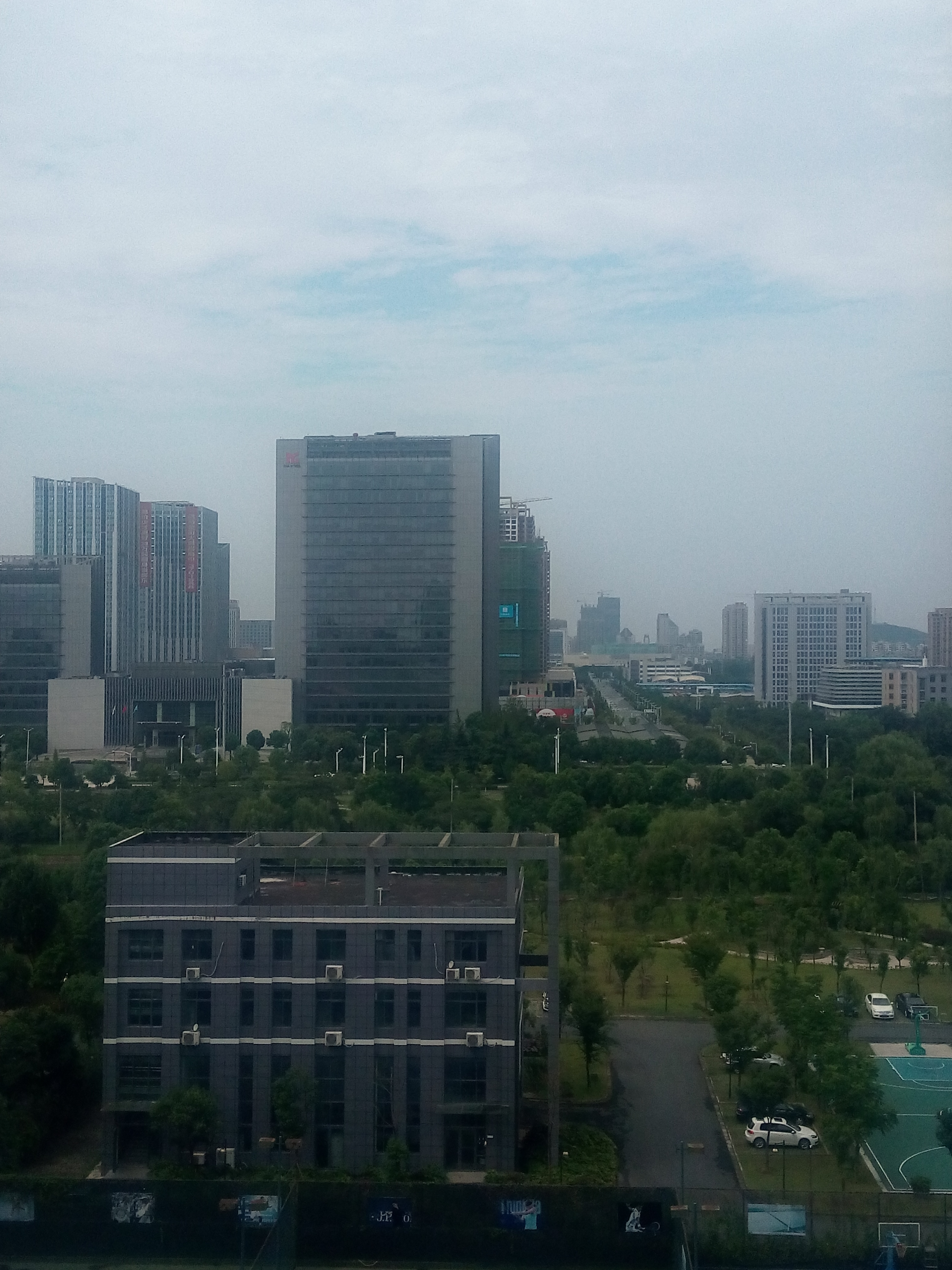
In Ma'anshan City

Yushan (Chinese: 雨山; pinyin: Yǔshān) is a district and the seat of the city of Ma'anshan, Anhui Province, China.

== Administrative divisions ==
Yushan District has 4 Subdistricts, 2 towns and 1 township.

4 Subdistricts

- Pinghu Subdistrict (平湖街道)
- Yushan Subdistrict (雨山街道)
- Anmin Subdistrict (安民街道)
- Caishi Subdistrict (采石街道)

2 Towns

- Xiangshan (向山镇)
- Yintang (银塘镇)

1 Township

- Jiashan Township (佳山乡)
