= Huashan, Ma'anshan =

Coordinates: 31°42′10″N 118°30′13″E

Huashan 花山区
- District
- Interactive map of Huashan
- Country: China
- Province: Anhui
- Prefecture-level city: Ma'anshan
- District seat: Huoli

Area
  - Total: 179 km^{2} (69 sq mi)

Population (2020)
  - Total: 450,983
  - Density: 2,520/km^{2} (6,530/sq mi)
- Time zone: UTC+8 (China Standard)
- Postal code: 243000

Huashan (Chinese: 花山; pinyin: Huāshān; lit. 'flower mountain') is a district of the city of Ma'anshan, Anhui Province, China. In September 2012, Jinjiazhuang District was dissolved and merged with Huashan District.

== Administrative divisions ==
Huashan District has 9 subdistricts, 1 town and 1 other.

9 subdistricts are: Shatanglu Subdistrict (沙塘路街道), Jifanglu Subdistrict (解放路街道), Hudonglu Subdistrict (湖东路街道), Taoyuanlu Subdistrict (桃源路街道), Huoli Subdistrict (霍里街道), Jinjiazhuang Subdistrict (金家庄街道), Tangxi Subdistrict (塘西街道), Cihu Subdistrict (慈湖街道), Jiangdong Subdistrict (江东街道);

1 town is: Putang Town (濮塘镇);

1 other township-level division is: Ma'anshan Cihu High-tech Industrial Development Zone (马鞍山慈湖高新技术产业开发区).

Administrative level	Old Huashan District	Former Jinjiazhuang District
Subdistrict	Huoli Subdistrict (霍里街道)	Jinjiazhuang Subdistrict (金家庄街道)
	Shatanglu Subdistrict (沙塘路街道)	Tangxi Subdistrict (塘西街道)
	Jiefanglu Subdistrict (解放路街道)	Cihu Subdistrict (慈湖街道)
	Hudonglu Subdistrict (湖东路街道)	Jiangbian Subdistrict (江边街道)
	Taoyuanlu Subdistrict (桃源路街道)	
Town		Cihu Township (慈湖乡)
