= Ma'anshan =

Ma'anshan 马鞍山市 Maanshan
- Prefecture-level city
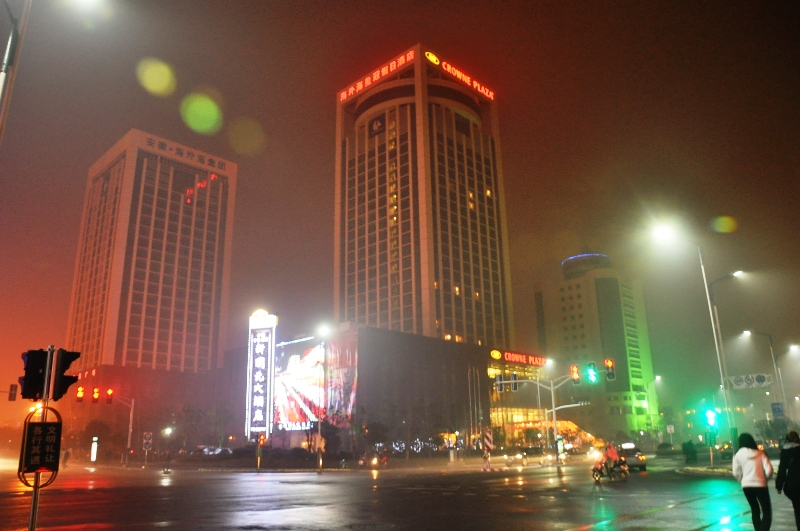

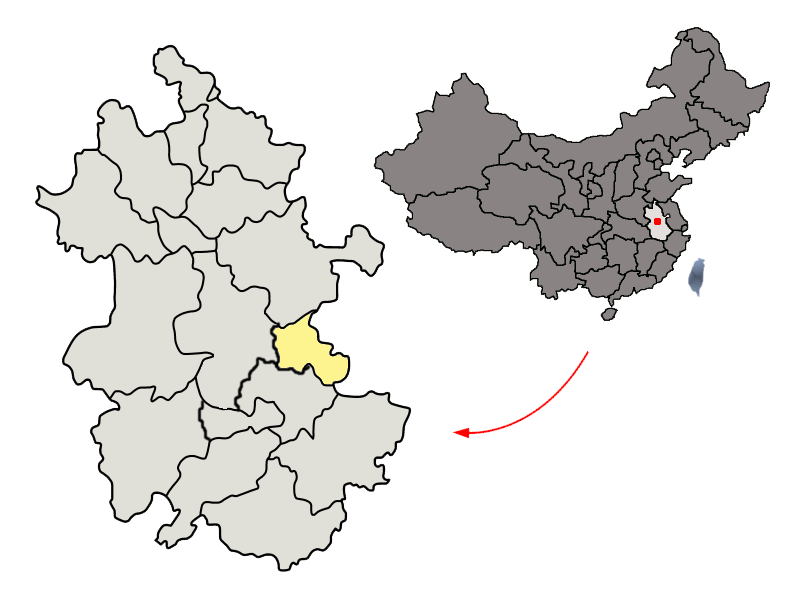
- Location of Ma'anshan City jurisdiction in Anhui
- Coordinates (Ma'anshan municipal government): 31°40′08″N 118°30′25″E
- Country: People's Republic of China
- Province: Anhui
- County-level divisions: 6
- Township-level divisions: 49
- Municipal seat: Yushan District

Government
  - CPC Secretary: Zheng Weiwen (郑为文)
  - Mayor: Zhang Xiaolin (张晓麟)

Area
  - Prefecture-level city: 4,053 km^{2} (1,565 sq mi)
  - Urban: 710.5 km^{2} (274.3 sq mi)
  - Metro: 1,695.6 km^{2} (654.7 sq mi)

Population (2020 census)
  - Prefecture-level city: 2,159,930
  - Density: 532.9/km^{2} (1,380/sq mi)
  - Urban: 965,452
  - Urban density: 1,359/km^{2} (3,519/sq mi)
  - Metro: 1,253,960
  - Metro density: 739.54/km^{2} (1,915.4/sq mi)

GDP
  - Prefecture-level city: CN¥ 243.9 billion US$ 30.5 billion
  - Per capita: CN¥ 113,089; US$ 17,530
- Time zone: UTC+8 (China Standard)
- Postal code: 243000
- Area code: 555
- ISO 3166 code: CN-AH-05
- License Plate Prefix: 皖E

Ma'anshan
- Simplified Chinese: 马鞍山
- Traditional Chinese: 馬鞍山
- Literal meaning: Horse Saddle Mountain
Transcriptions
Standard Mandarin
- Hanyu Pinyin: Mǎ'ānshān
- IPA: [mà.án.ʂán]

Ma'anshan (simplified Chinese: 马鞍山; traditional Chinese: 馬鞍山; pinyin: Mǎ ān Shān), also colloquially written as Maanshan, is a prefecture-level city in the eastern part of Anhui province in Eastern China. Its aliases include Taiping, Steel City, and Poetry City. An industrial city stretching across the Yangtze River, Ma'anshan borders Hefei to the west, Wuhu to the southwest, and Nanjing to the east. It is a satellite city in the Nanjing metropolitan area and is also a city in the Yangtze River Delta Economic Zone.

As of the 2020 census, Ma'anshan was home to 2,159,930 inhabitants, of whom 1,253,960 lived in the built-up (or metro) area made of Huashan and Yushan urban districts and Dangtu County, which is largely urbanized.

One can notice that Ma'anshan is now being conurbated with Nanjing making a combined built-up area of 8,419,252 inhabitants. After the August 2011 administrative re-regionalization of Anhui Province, its population rose to 2.16 million, as two additional counties (He and Hanshan) were placed under its administration.

== Administration ==
The prefecture-level city of Ma'anshan administers 6 county-level divisions, including 3 districts and 3 counties.

- Yushan District (雨山区)
- Huashan District (花山区)
- Bowang District (博望区)
- Dangtu County (当涂县)
- He County (和县)
- Hanshan County (含山县)

In September 2012, Jinjiazhuang District was dissolved and merged with Huashan District, while part of Dangtu County was split and established as Bowang District.

Map
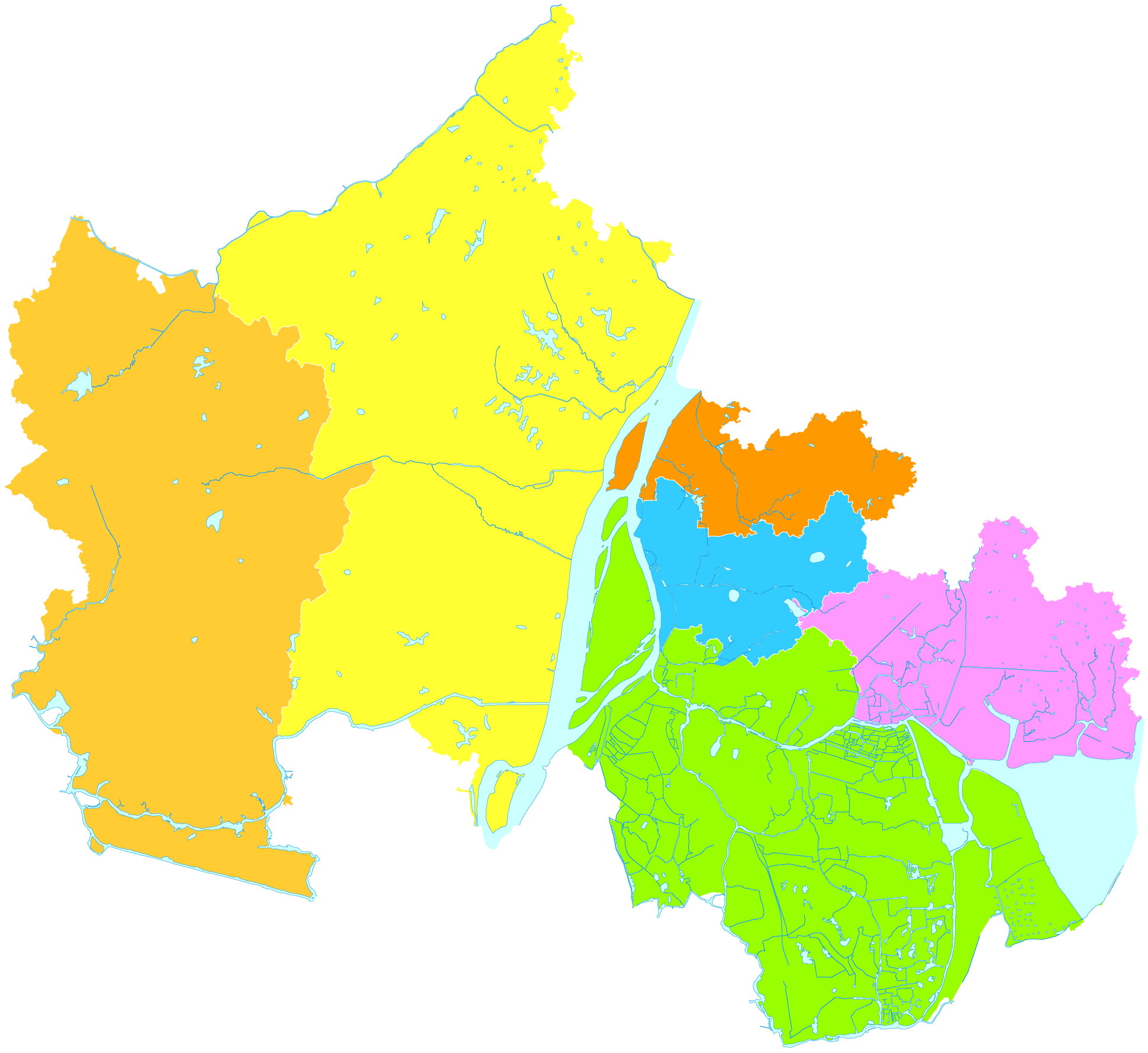

== Name ==
The name of the city means "Horse Saddle Mountain". According to legend, the name came to be when the Western Chu hegemon Xiang Yu was fleeing from the Battle of Gaixia. Rather than be captured, the defeated general killed himself at the area now known as Ma'anshan after ensuring that his beloved horse would be ferried across the river to safety. Upon seeing his master die, the grief-stricken horse leapt into the river and was drowned. As a tribute, the boatman buried the horse's saddle on a nearby hill, giving Ma'anshan its name.

== City flower and city tree ==
Osmanthus fragrans is the city flower of Ma'anshan and is widely planted in Ma'anshan. The climate of Ma'anshan is more rainy and mild, suitable for the growth of sweet-scented osmanthus. Generally from mid-September to Chinese National Day, the sweet-scented osmanthus blooms.

Camphor tree is the city tree of Ma'anshan. Camphor trees are very popular among residents of Ma'anshan. Residents of Ma'anshan City often regard camphor trees as landscape trees and feng shui trees. Feng shui in China means warding off evil spirits, longevity and good luck.

== History ==
The south bank of the Yangtze River from Ma'anshan upstream for 240 km (150 mi), has long been a mining area. The coming of a railroad and the opening of the Huai-nan coalfield in the 1930s made it possible for the Japanese to open an iron and steel works in 1938. Although destroyed at the end of the Second World War, the industries were restored to production in 1953, and Ma'anshan grew rapidly under the Communists' first and second Five-Year Plans. Ma'anshan also has sulfur and limestone mines, and chemical and cement factories. In 1954, Ma'anshan was elevated to town level, and, on October 12, 1956, Ma'anshan City was declared to be founded.

== Geography and climate ==
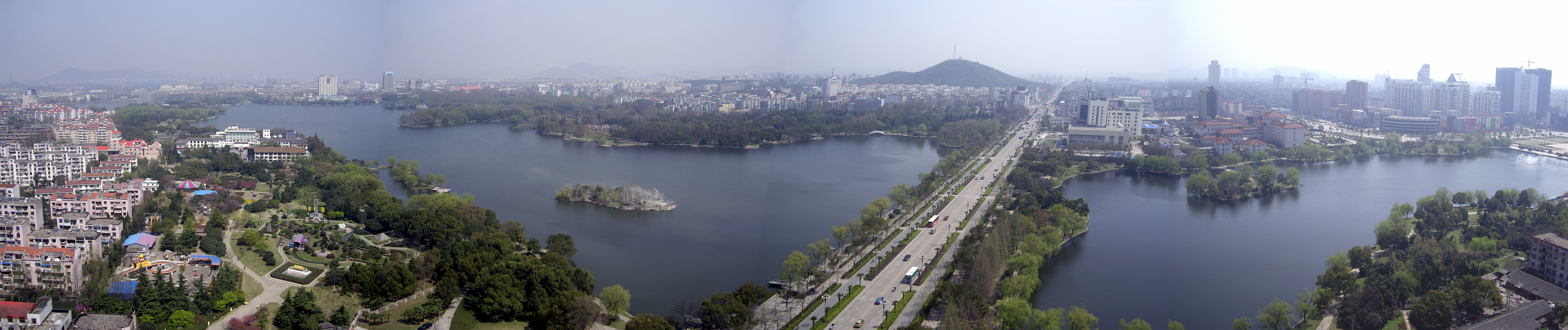
Yushan and Nanhu lakes in Ma'anshan

Surrounded by low hills (the name of the city means "horse saddle mountain"), Ma'anshan is not as polluted as other major Chinese steelmaking cities, thanks to the environmental policies taken by the local government that granted the city the recognition as one of the "Ten Green Cities of China."

It has a northern subtropical humid monsoon climate with obvious monsoons, four distinct seasons, warm and humid climate, and rain and heat in the same season. Its climate is similar to other cities in the Yangtze River Delta, with lower humidity that makes its summers and winters less extreme. There are frequent showers during July and August.

Caishi Rock (采石矶; 采石磯), a famous ancient battlefield from the Jin–Song Wars lying to the southwest of the city, is regarded as the best of three rocks that project over the Yangtze River. Taibai pavilion is one of four famous pavilions along the Yangtze river. Caishi scenic area is a national tourism spot, with a combination of natural and cultural attractions.

Climate data for Ma'anshan, elevation 80 m (260 ft), (1991–2020 normals, extremes 1981–present)
| Month | Jan | Feb | Mar | Apr | May | Jun | Jul | Aug | Sep | Oct | Nov | Dec | Year |
|---|---|---|---|---|---|---|---|---|---|---|---|---|---|
| Record high °C (°F) | 22.2 (72.0) | 28.5 (83.3) | 34.3 (93.7) | 34.0 (93.2) | 36.2 (97.2) | 37.7 (99.9) | 39.9 (103.8) | 42.7 (108.9) | 37.9 (100.2) | 33.7 (92.7) | 29.0 (84.2) | 22.1 (71.8) | 42.7 (108.9) |
| Mean daily maximum °C (°F) | 7.6 (45.7) | 10.4 (50.7) | 15.4 (59.7) | 21.7 (71.1) | 26.8 (80.2) | 29.3 (84.7) | 32.6 (90.7) | 32.2 (90.0) | 28.1 (82.6) | 23.0 (73.4) | 16.7 (62.1) | 10.2 (50.4) | 21.2 (70.1) |
| Daily mean °C (°F) | 3.5 (38.3) | 6.0 (42.8) | 10.5 (50.9) | 16.6 (61.9) | 21.9 (71.4) | 25.2 (77.4) | 28.6 (83.5) | 28.0 (82.4) | 23.7 (74.7) | 18.3 (64.9) | 12.0 (53.6) | 5.9 (42.6) | 16.7 (62.0) |
| Mean daily minimum °C (°F) | 0.5 (32.9) | 2.5 (36.5) | 6.7 (44.1) | 12.3 (54.1) | 17.7 (63.9) | 21.7 (71.1) | 25.3 (77.5) | 24.8 (76.6) | 20.4 (68.7) | 14.6 (58.3) | 8.4 (47.1) | 2.6 (36.7) | 13.1 (55.6) |
| Record low °C (°F) | −10.5 (13.1) | −11.7 (10.9) | −4.0 (24.8) | 1.0 (33.8) | 7.4 (45.3) | 13.2 (55.8) | 18.9 (66.0) | 17.1 (62.8) | 12.1 (53.8) | 2.7 (36.9) | −5.0 (23.0) | −13.7 (7.3) | −13.7 (7.3) |
| Average precipitation mm (inches) | 55.1 (2.17) | 60.6 (2.39) | 89.2 (3.51) | 91.3 (3.59) | 90.1 (3.55) | 196.3 (7.73) | 193.6 (7.62) | 164.6 (6.48) | 69.3 (2.73) | 52.8 (2.08) | 55.5 (2.19) | 38.3 (1.51) | 1,156.7 (45.55) |
| Average precipitation days (≥ 0.1 mm) | 10.1 | 9.5 | 11.6 | 10.4 | 10.5 | 11.2 | 12.2 | 12.0 | 8.5 | 8.1 | 8.8 | 7.8 | 120.7 |
| Average snowy days | 3.9 | 2.5 | 0.8 | 0.1 | 0 | 0 | 0 | 0 | 0 | 0 | 0.4 | 1.1 | 8.8 |
| Average relative humidity (%) | 73 | 72 | 70 | 69 | 70 | 77 | 78 | 79 | 77 | 72 | 72 | 70 | 73 |
| Mean monthly sunshine hours | 112.1 | 116.9 | 145.1 | 171.3 | 183.5 | 147.2 | 186.1 | 180.5 | 152.7 | 157.3 | 139.7 | 130.3 | 1,822.7 |
| Percentage possible sunshine | 35 | 37 | 39 | 44 | 43 | 35 | 43 | 44 | 42 | 45 | 45 | 42 | 41 |
Source: China Meteorological Administration all-time extreme temperature all-time January high

== Economy ==
The main industry is the steel industry (MaGang) which employs much of the workforce of Ma'anshan. At present (2005) major expansions of the steel plant are underway to increase production drastically. With the advanced manufacturing infrastructure and fast transportation link, Ma'anshan has received much investment in many industries.

Ma'anshan city has an annual manufacture investment ranking No.1 in Anhui Province and her GDP ranks No.4 in Anhui Province after Hefei, Anqing and Wuhu. Ma'anshan's population ranks No.16 in the province and has a GDP per capita of US$7,118 which is No.1 in Anhui Province and near the average of Yangtze River Delta.

Maanshan has been identified by the Economist Intelligence Unit in the November 2010 Access China White Paper as a member of the CHAMPS (Chongqing, Hefei, Anshan, Ma'anshan, Pingdingshan and Shenyang), an economic profile of the top 20 emerging cities in China.

== Transportation ==
The deep water river port of Ma'anshan, with custom offices ensures fast and inexpensive transportation to other cities both in the East coast, and the inner cities along the Yangtze River. Nanjing Lukou International Airport is 40 km (25 mi) from Ma'anshan, with direct flights to every corner of China and also daily flights to Europe. By road, Ma'anshan is connected with highways to Nanjing, Shanghai, Hangzhou, Ningbo, Hefei and Wuhu.

The city has one Yangtze River crossing—the Ma'anshan Yangtze River Bridge, opened in 2013, enables direct road access to cities in northern Anhui.

As of 2026, the Nanjing Metro extends to Ma'anshan, with the Line S2 (Nanjing Metro) connecting Nanjing with Ma'anshan as well as Dangtu County to the south.

== Culture ==
There is a memorial to the famous Chinese poet, Li Bai (a.k.a. Li Po c.700-762), just west of Ma'anshan. Li Bai is said to have drowned at Ma'anshan after attempting to embrace a reflection of the moon.

China's first poetry festival was held in Ma'anshan from October 25–30, 2005. The theme of the festival, sponsored by the Ministry of Culture, the Chinese Writers Association, and the Anhui provincial government, was "Poetic China, Harmonious China." The Ma'anshan Sports Centre Stadium, a 36,542-capacity venue, is located in the city. The football stadium opened in 2019.

== Shopping ==
- Dahua International Plaza is located in the northeast corner of Tuanjie Plaza, with a total construction area of 140,000 square meters. It is currently the largest comprehensive shopping mall in Maanshan City.
- Ma'anshan Yaohan is located in Building A, Phase II of Dahua Plaza. It opened on November 28, 2009. It has a business area of 36,000 square meters and 600 underground parking spaces. On November 28, 2010, a single-day sales record of Huadi Group Yaohan was set at 27 million yuan.
- Xintiandi Plaza is located on Jiefang Road Commercial Street.
- Hongtai Xinbai is located in Jiefang Road Commercial Street with a business area of 15,000 square meters.
- Hong Kong City is located at the intersection of Hunan Road and Hudong Road.
- Golden Eagle International is located at the intersection of Hunan Road and Hudong Road. It opened on August 29, 2015.
- Wanda Plaza is a large-scale high-end shopping mall under Wanda Group.
- Impression City is located at the intersection of Yushan Road and Kangle Road.

== Cultural places ==
- Zhu Ran Family Cemetery
- Li Bai Tomb
- Hexian Yuanren Site
- Lingjiatan Site
- Taibailou
- Caishi Rock
- Taibai Tower (Zanxian Tower, one of the three famous buildings on the Yangtze River)
- Sanyuandong
- Santai Court
- Yushan Lake
- Putang Scenic Area
- Li Bai Cemetery
- Tomb of Zhu Ran
- Overlord Temple
- Baochan Mountain
- Jilongshan National Forest Park

== Local products ==
- Hengwang Mountain Rice Wine: Hengwangshan rice wine has a long history, dating back to the Jin and Tang dynasties. According to historical records, the current Hengwangshan rice wine originated in the Qing period. Hengwang Mountain rice wine, brewed by ancient methods, is exquisite. In 2013, Hengwangshan rice wine brewing skills were announced as the fourth batch of municipal intangible cultural heritage protection list by the Maanshan Municipal Government.
- Bowang Wind fish: When wind fish was founded, the exact age is no longer available. There is a saying that in the late Qing Dynasty, an outsider was involved in the management of fishing in the Shijiu Lake area of Bowang. Since there were a lot of bream fish, and they could not be refrigerated in that era, he created a way to dry the fish for long-term preservation. It was recognized as a national green food in 2008.
- Taihushan antler: Taihu Mountain antler is a special product of Taihu Mountain, Hanshan County, Ma'anshan City, Anhui Province. It is produced in Taihu Mountain Deer Farm. Antler is a precious medicinal material, which has the functions of invigorating arteries, producing essence, and strengthening bones. It is divided into sika antler and red antler. Sika antler, also called yellow antler or flower antler, mostly has 1 to 2 branches; red antler, also known as green antler, is thicker and has more branches. Antler is a precious Chinese medicinal material with sweet, salty, warm nature and non-toxic.

== Education ==
- Anhui University of Technology (安徽工业大学)
- Hohai University Wentian College which is a high institute mainly focus in trading and business management, and expanding to offer the international bachelor's degree for several majors bilingually in English and Chinese.

== See also ==
- List of twin towns and sister cities in China
- Chinese frigate Ma'anshan
