= History of SSC Bari =

History of Italian association football club SSC Bari

The history of Società Sportiva Calcio Bari, a professional Italian football club based in Bari, Apulia, dates back to its founding in 1908. The club has undergone several transformations, including the formation of a phoenix club in 2018 after financial issues led to its exclusion from Serie B. Since then, SSC Bari have steadily improved, earning promotion to Serie C in 2019 and eventually to Serie B in 2022.

== From the beginnings of soccer in Bari to the 1920s ==
=== Origins (1908-1915) ===
The first soccer team founded in Bari, as well as in the entire region of Apulia, was the ephemeral Club Foot-Ball Challenge, which arose in 1901 on the initiative of a group of students. On the other hand, the establishment of the city's first stable club, the Foot-Ball Club Bari, dates back to January 15, 1908. As in the case of many other Italian soccer clubs, the founding of Bari was characterized, in addition to the contribution of local sportsmen (including some veterans of the Club Football Challenge period), by the participation of some outsiders: Floriano Ludwig, an Austrian who had moved to Bari and was the main founder, Gustavo Kuhn, a Swiss, who was joined by Giovanni Tiberini, a Marche native who had moved to Bari and led sons of Bari merchants.

In the first lineup, Ludwig can be recognized, standing first from the left, along with other foreigners, in Bari for work, and Bari residents: next to Ludwig standing from the left are Barther and Bach; in the center are Attoma, Roth, and Labourdette; below are Jovinet, Giordano, Gazagne, Randi, and Ziegler.

Originally the players wore garnet jerseys and white shorts and played mainly against English sailors at Campo San Lorenzo (Bari's military-owned place-of-arms) in the San Pasquale district.

==== The debut in southern Italian soccer and the birth of Liberty and Ideale ====
Although the club was founded very early compared to others the team, like almost all of those then existing in Southern Italy, was not well represented in the leagues of Italian soccer, so F.B.C. Bari took part in only a few official seasons (i.e., organized by the F.I.F., F.I.G.C. since 1909).

In the South, in the pre-World War I period only Campania appears (at the time) to have held an official regional championship annually.

From the F.B.C. Bari (which soon came to include five teams, depending on the age of the members) two sports clubs split off: in 1908 the Unione Sportiva Ideale (which initially played in a blue jersey with a white star on the left side of the chest and white shorts; black-green stripes adopted instead in 1915), and in 1909 the Foot-Ball Club Liberty (which wore red-blue colors with horizontal stripes and white shorts, later changed in 1915 to white-blue vertical stripes). These three formations competed in friendly derby matches and against teams organized by sailors who had landed in Bari, and later in matches and tournaments (always unofficial) with other Apulian formations, although initially Liberty and Ideale (formed mainly by teenagers) were precluded from challenges against the first teams and the most relevant competitions.

The first official championships of the Bari red shirts mentioned by the available sources are those of the 1909–1910 season: the first team lost the small Southern Championship of the Seconda Categoria (the second football league of the time; according to the data so far available, the Southern championship would have been the first official interregional round played in the South of Italy) against Naples Foot-Ball Club (as a result of the Neapolitans' 6–2 win in Naples in the first leg and Bari's 0-2 forfeit in the return), while the reserve formation (second team) won the regional round of the Terza Categoria with full points against the first teams of Sporting Club Lecce and Pro Italia of Taranto.

In the following season the biancorossi lost the second edition of the southern championship played with Naples, as a result of a home draw and a defeat (2-2 the first and 7-0 the second result, respectively, in the Campania capital). In 1915, during wartime, F.B.C. Bari was disbanded, while Liberty and Ideale barely managed to sustain themselves financially so as not to close down (also due to the severe lack of athletes, all of whom left for the front).

=== Re-founding in the early postwar period and the 1920s (1924-1927) ===
After the end of the war, FBC Bari was temporarily disbanded, and Liberty, which had always been appreciative of FBC Bari's "lineage" and was getting increasingly better organized, picked up the sporting legacy of the original Bari (Ludwig himself and his collaborator Kuhn became senior executives of the white-and-blue club). The mutual rivalry between Liberty and Ideale grew as time went on, and soon Liberty identified itself as the aristocrats and members of the bourgeoisie, Ideale as the proletarians.

On January 16, 1924, FBC Bari was re-founded, but not by the same members as sixteen years earlier, and gained access to the Prima Divisione. It then participated, for the first time together with the Libertians and Idealists, in an official competition in the 1924-25 season (meanwhile, Liberty had already gained access to official championships in 1921, Ideale in 1922), ending at the bottom of its group. Suspended from official activity in 1925, FBC Bari finally played in the 1926-1927 Terza Divisione, finishing last in its group and disbanding shortly thereafter (in these three years it was little followed, because by then in Bari and its province attentions were fervently turned to Liberty and Ideale).

== From 1928 to World War II (1928-1945) ==
=== The birth of U.S. Bari and the Serie B (1928-1931) ===
In the 1927-1928 season, at the end of a top championship in the Prima Divisione (then corresponding to the second national football level), Liberty (renamed "Bari Football Club" from February 1927) reached the Divisione Nazionale for the first time with a decisive 5–3 victory over Fiorentina in Bari on January 15, 1928.

When the championship was over, as in several other cities in Italy (e.g. Salerno, Naples, Florence and Rome), Bari F.C. (formerly Liberty) and Ideale merged into the Unione Sportiva Bari on February 27, 1928. The new U.S. Bari was the first Apulian formation in history to participate in the highest soccer championship.

Starting in the 1928-29 season, Bari began wearing white jerseys with red lapels and white shorts (picking up the colors of the municipal coat of arms). On September 22, 1928, Alfredo Bogardo, a journalist for the local newspaper "Cinesport," taking up Carlo Bergoglio's idea from the Guerin Sportivo, launched a popular referendum to assign a symbol to Bari and its players: the most voted for was the cockerel (which prevailed over eaglets, squirrels, sparrows and gazelles). In contrast, the nickname "robins," coined by the Gazzetta del Mezzogiorno, was short-lived.

Bari played their home matches in the Campo degli Sports; a stadium built in the Bari neighborhood of Carrassi in December 1925, by the Società Anonima S.A.S., on the initiative of Liberty.

After the '28-'29 season, the league system was reorganized and Bari, ranked 13th (in the National Division), was placed in the newly established "Serie B." Young Bari player Raffaele Costantino (formerly a center forward for Liberty, who later remained in the newly unified Bari), nicknamed "young king" by his fans, was called up for the Italian national team for the first time, making Bari the first Serie B team to see one of its own players called up for the national team.

In 1929 Pippo Scategni joined. After an attempt at an immediate return to the top division in the 1929-1930 season, which failed amidst conspicuous ups and downs and the serious injury of 25-year-old Bari player Totò Lella (due to a kick suffered to the abdomen in the match played away from home against Fiumana, the young man suffered a lung injury, dying of a worsening condition in 1932), coach János Hajdú (formerly a midfielder for the old Liberty), Dario Gay, and Piero Bottaro were recruited (Costantino was traded to Roma, in Serie A, and then returned to Bari in '35). The Apulians led a successful 1930-'31 season, returning to the top division.

=== Early seasons in Serie A (1931-1943) ===
For the Serie A, Hajdú was replaced by the Hungarian Árpád Weisz, former Italian champion in 1929–1930 with Ambrosiana-Inter (and future winner of two scudetti with Bologna; he was later expelled from Italy in 1938 because he was Jewish and perished in Auschwitz in 1944). The first round was very difficult and at the end of the season the team was saved by winning the play-off against Brescia.

In the following year Weisz returned to Ambrosiana. Due to insufficient liquidity, many of the most highly valued athletes were sold, including Bottaro; among the newcomers were Luigi Ferrero and goalkeeper Alferio Cubi. In the league, after some good results the team collected few points in the first round, improved in the return round and suffered 13 penalties (an all-time record for the 18-team Serie A); it relegated by a few points in the last days.

In the following season in Serie B (in those years split into two rounds), the roster was rejuvenated and put under the leadership of Tony Cargnelli; Gay and Scategni left. At the end of the championship, after having placed first in the standings of their round, the "biancorossi" lost 1-0 the promotion match in Bologna with Sampierdarenese (who came first in the northern round): after having shown great fervor, the "biancorossi" fell, under applause, into tears for the missed promotion.

On September 6, 1934, Benito Mussolini inaugurated the new Stadio della Vittoria.

The goal of promotion to the top division was achieved in the 1934-1935 season, under the leadership of András Kuttik.

The years 1935-1941 saw Bari's permanence in Serie A.

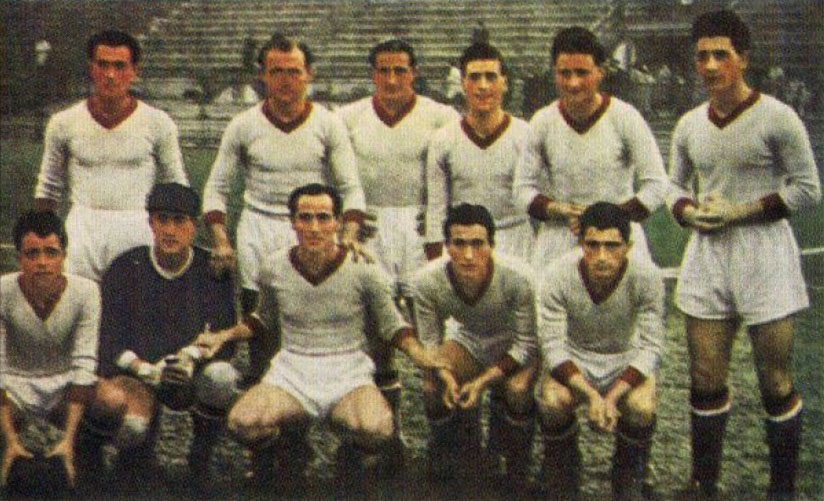
A line-up of U.S. Bari in the 1940–41 season.

In 1936 Cargnelli returned as coach (he left Bari again two years later). In the Jan. 3, 1937 match against Alessandria, young Bari midfielder Francesco Capocasale, in his second first-team match, scored the winning goal for the 2–1 win; in the April 18 match against Ambrosiana Cesarino Grossi (also a Bari debutant) helped the lineup in the comeback from 0-2 (to 2-2); becoming a crowd favorite. Grossi's limited stature earned Grossi the nickname "pocket center forward." In the 1936-37 Coppa Italia Bari was eliminated in the quarterfinals by Milan. In 1938 Ferrero also left and Tommaso Maestrelli (from Bari but born in Pisa) moved up to the first team. In 1939 Costantino ceased his competitive activity (he remained in Bari's management as sporting director, also taking over the technical leadership of the team on several occasions); Cubi, Grossi (who left for the war, died in Albania, to the great sorrow of Italian soccer) and Capocasale, who was sold to Juventus, left. Alessandro Carlini was hired. Bari reached the semifinals of the 1939-1940 Coppa Italia, being eliminated 0–2 by Genoa.

The club's balance sheet was going increasingly into deficit (partly because of an open gap in the stadium fences, often used to avoid paying for tickets) and in the summer of 1940 the management was forced to sell many of the most highly valued athletes; among the various purchases Bari's goalkeeper Leonardo Costagliola joined. In 1941 the team relegated, ending the galletti's longest period so far in Serie A: six years. Bari went back up to the first division the following year, taking first place in Serie B; in '43, however, it fell back to the second division, at the play-offs. Many thought of a conspiracy against the galletti (Maestrelli left at the end of the season). However, the team benefited from a readmission to the top division due to wartime causes.

=== The last years of the war (1943-1945) ===
The 1943-1944 championship was not played due to the full outbreak of the war. U.S. Bari interrupted sports activities and did not renew the contracts of the athletes, who from the beginning of 1944 were released. The Stadio della Vittoria and the Campo degli Sports, after the liberation of southern Italy were occupied by the Allied military (along with the sports fields of the then hamlets of Bari).

US Bari was reconstituted in December 1944, by people partly different from those of the past management, who on January 1, 1945, changed the name of the club to Associazione Sportiva Bari and retained many players from 1943 and then entered the "Mixed National Championship."

The "biancorossi" played the first two home matches, of the mixed championship at the "Antonio Lella field," a makeshift field located on Via Crispi (in Bari's Marconi district) and set up by the refounded Liberty; also participating in the same tournament (in one of the two matches played at Lella, the new A.S. Bari beat the Libertians 5–1; no derby had been played in Bari for eighteen years). At the end of February, the Allies granted the reuse of the Della Vittoria, and on March 4 the "biancorossi" returned to tread the ground, beating Presidio Lecce 2–1. The Bari team ended the competition (marked by disturbances due to fan intemperance, with the exclusion of six teams of the initial thirteen and the early end of the tournament) in first place, with 27 points and three points behind the runner-up.

Shortly before the new championship Capocasale returned to the red-and-whites and Tommaso Annoscia became president of the new club.

== The postwar period (1945-1961) ==
=== From Bari "Star of the South" to the fall to IV Serie (1945-1952) ===
In the 1945-46 season, Bari finished in first place, tied with Napoli as leaders, in the Center-South round of the "mixed A-B championship." In the 1946-1947 season (dominated by Grande Torino) Bari, coached first by Costantino and then by András Kuttik (a change needed to make the conversion from metodo to sistema), remained for several days in fourth place; in the return round it lost some positions in the standings and finished the competition in seventh place; a finish not yet equaled. This Bari is remembered as the "Star of the South."

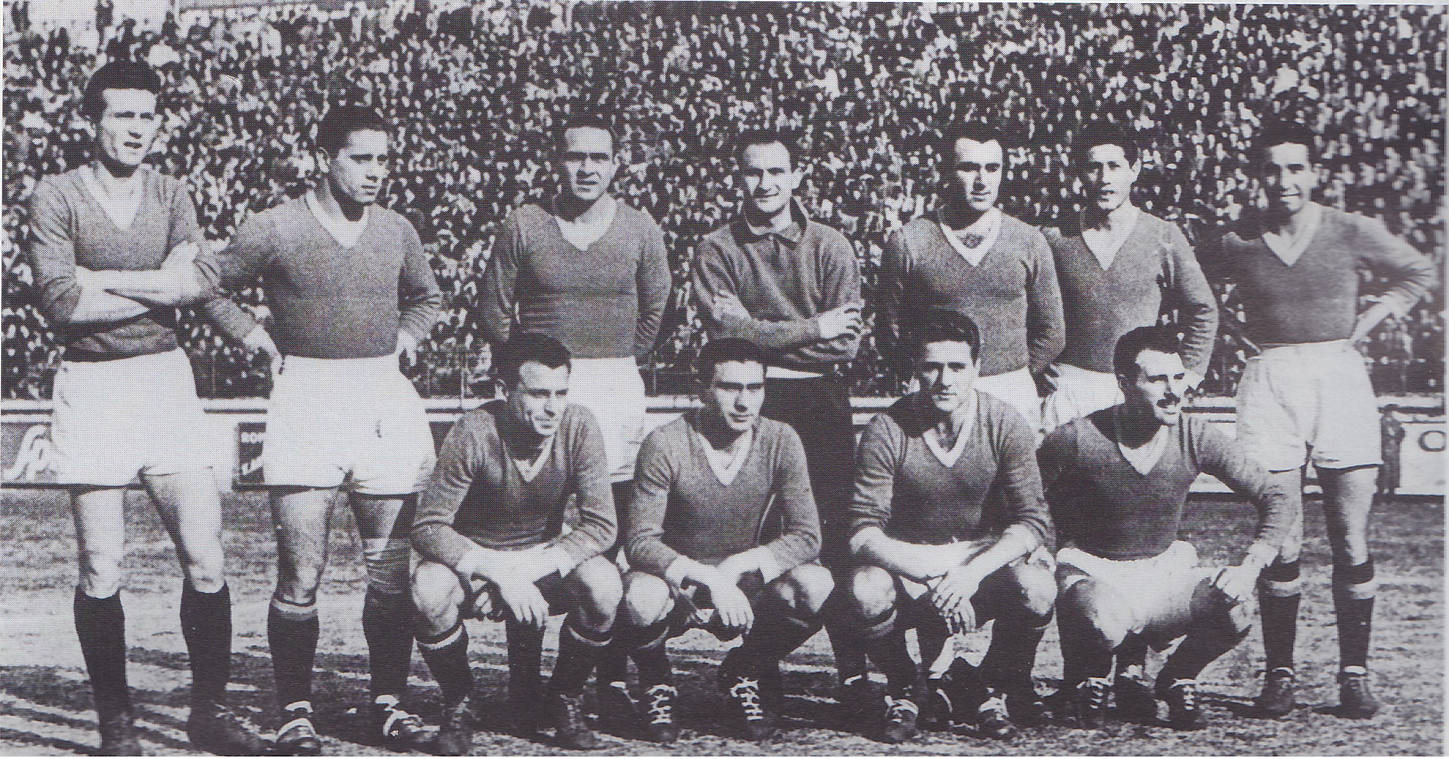
Bari squad before a match in the 1946-1947 Serie A championship. Standing: Maestrelli, Tavellin, Giammarco, Costagliola, Fusco, Cavone, Spadavecchia. Crouched: Carlini, Capocasale, Tontodonati and Pellicari.

In 1947 Mihály Vörös made his debut, in '48 Costagliola left. On September 21, 1947, on the second day of the championship, the galletti beat the Scudetto-winning Torino 1–0 at home (as a result of a goal by Guido Tavellin in the 75th minute). From this point on, the Bari team had a fluctuating performance, and in 1950 they relegated. The club denounced refereeing errors and as a result of the repeated appeals, President Annoscia was disqualified for three years and decided to retire from the world of soccer. The following year the galletti relegated again and having finished sixth in round G of the 1951-'52 Serie C, they were relegated to the newly established IV Serie as a result of the Barassi award (issued a few months earlier). In 1951 Nicola Chiricallo made his first-team debut, who left after two championships along with Vörös.

Also in '51, Bari's old administration left the scene, taking on past debts; thus A.S. Bari began to be managed by a municipal regency committee.

=== The rise from the minor leagues (1952-1958) ===
In 1953 the regency committee appointed the lawyer Achille Tarsia Incuria (city councilor for sports) as president; he favored a policy of buying and selling athletes based on saving money. That same year, the Bari native Francesco Capocasale (already a Bari footballer and coach in previous years) was chosen as coach and Mario Mazzoni was purchased, who then remained in Bari for ten years and was the club's third most-capped player, with 313 appearances. Capocasale led the galletti to first place in the IV Serie H group; the category jump was awarded at the end of a hard-fought mini-round, in the match played in Naples on June 27, 1954, and won by the biancorossi 2–1 against Colleferro (both goals were scored by Raffaele Gamberini). The 20,000 Bari residents in attendance celebrated this event almost like winning a Scudetto. By winning then in the knockout round against Prato and the double-round finals against Cremonese, the biancorossi earned the title of "Italian Champions of IV Serie."

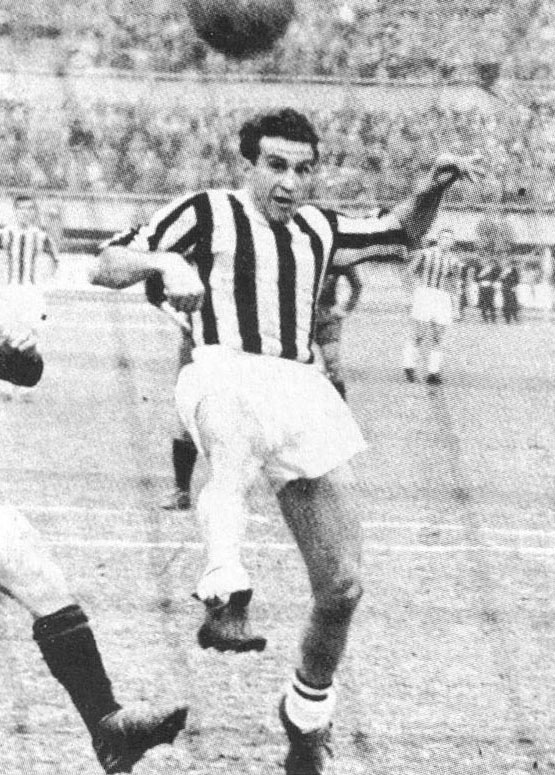
An imaginative Argentinian midfielder who played for Bari at the turn of the 1950s and 1960s, Raúl Conti is regarded as one of the most brilliant playmakers in the club's history.

After bringing Bari back to the second division the following season, Capocasale took his leave from Bari. After two years of "stabilization" in the second division, in '58 the galletti, led by Federico Allasio made the leap to Serie A, after a second-place finish and two play-offs on a neutral field against Verona, penultimate in Serie A (the play-offs were required by a new federal reform and the biancorossi won them 1-0 and 2–0, respectively, with all three goals signed by Paolo Erba).

=== The three-year period between 1958-1961 in Serie A ===
For the return to the first division, in the summer of 1958 the roster was reinforced with Argentine midfielder Raúl Conti and left winger Bruno Cicogna; Allasio moved on to coach Torino. That summer Bari said goodbye to forward Luigi Bretti (from '50 to '58 in Bari, with a year at Taranto in between), the team's top-scorer with 70 goals. In the 1958-1959 season in Serie A, the galletti, led by the austere Paolo Tabanelli achieved salvation with four days before the end of the championship and finished the competition in mid-table; several performances against top teams were praised. In January '59 Biagio Catalano (a forward; another Bari native from the youth academy) had made his debut in the top division. In the following season, after scoring 13 points in 19 games, with the team lying second to last in the standings, Tabanelli was replaced by Capocasale (who was returning after just four years on the biancorossa bench), who by bringing back several players, including Paolo Erba (author of 9 goals in 15 games, since Capocasale's return), achieved a clear turnaround for the biancorossa lineup, which earned 16 points in 15 games and avoided relegation. It went differently the following year, in which Capocasale was fired after scraping together two points in the first seven days; under the esteemed Argentine coach Luis Carniglia, the biancorossi ended the championship in third-last place in the standings, ex aequo with Lecco and Udinese, losing the relegation playoffs to the aforementioned teams (thus relegating to the second division after three years in the Serie A).

== De Palo presidency (1961-1977) ==
=== 1961-1972 ===
In 1961 Tagnin left, and two years later new coach Pietro Magni achieved the goal of promotion, at the end of a championship marked by numerous injuries; the galletti lost the semifinals of the Coppa Italia in Bergamo, against Atalanta (0–1), after beating Genoa (2–1), a Serie A side, in the quarterfinals. After promotion, Mazzoni left the capital; Raoul Conti had left in '62.

In '63, doctor Angelo De Palo (already a commissioner for two years) was elected president of A.S. Bari with the establishment of a nine-member board of directors.

In Serie A, Magni was fired after the first five days (with two points to his credit) and De Palo entrusted the second coach Tommaso Maestrelli with the technical guidance of the team (in the past, Maestrelli had only coached Lucchese, in 1953, for three Serie B matches); after six days, in which he had collected five points and some good results he was replaced by Tabanelli (back after four years), who did not prevent the biancorossi from another relegation, in last place. Reconfirmed for the following season in the second division, Tabanelli was fired after the 26th round of the championship; three other coaches followed until the end of the championship and Bari relegated in the last day, returning to the third division after ten years. It was in the third tier that Catalano played his last games among the galletti in 1965 and was sold. In '66 the young and little-known Lauro Toneatto (who had been Siena's coach in the previous season) was hired as coach: it was the beginning of a new cycle. With Toneatto's endorsement, Lucio Mujesan was hired.

The "drill sergeant" (this is how the players nicknamed the new coach for his severity) forged a solid team, with a tenacious defense and a strong midfield. The rise to Serie B was immediate, with 7 points behind the second place while the 1967-1968 season, at the end of a recovery of the biancorossi from the tail end of the standings to the top positions at the end of the championship, saw them miss the return to Serie A by one point. The following year De Palo disposed of the "long-lived" Cicogna (who spent a decade with the galletti) and was forced to sell Mujesan (who had scored 20 goals in the Serie C championship and 19 in the Serie B '67-'68 championship, establishing himself as top scorer), obtaining as part of the quid pro quo midfielder Mario Fara (who remained in Bari for four years). Without Mujesan, Toneatto led the biancorossi to third place and thus to the top flight.

Ahead of the 1969-70 Serie A championship, De Palo chose the outspoken Oronzo Pugliese as a replacement for Toneatto, who had prematurely agreed with Pisa. The new coach obtained the purchase of Vittorio Spimi. The team finished the first half of the season in mid-table, but suffered a decline in the second half, finishing last with 11 goals scored.

Toneatto returned to the biancorossa bench, with whom Bari finished in 1970-1971 Serie B in third place, along with Catanzaro and Atalanta, and lost the promotion play-offs for the first division against them; in the following year, the Friulian coach's team had to abandon its promotion hopes for the top division on the third-last day.

=== 1972-1977 ===
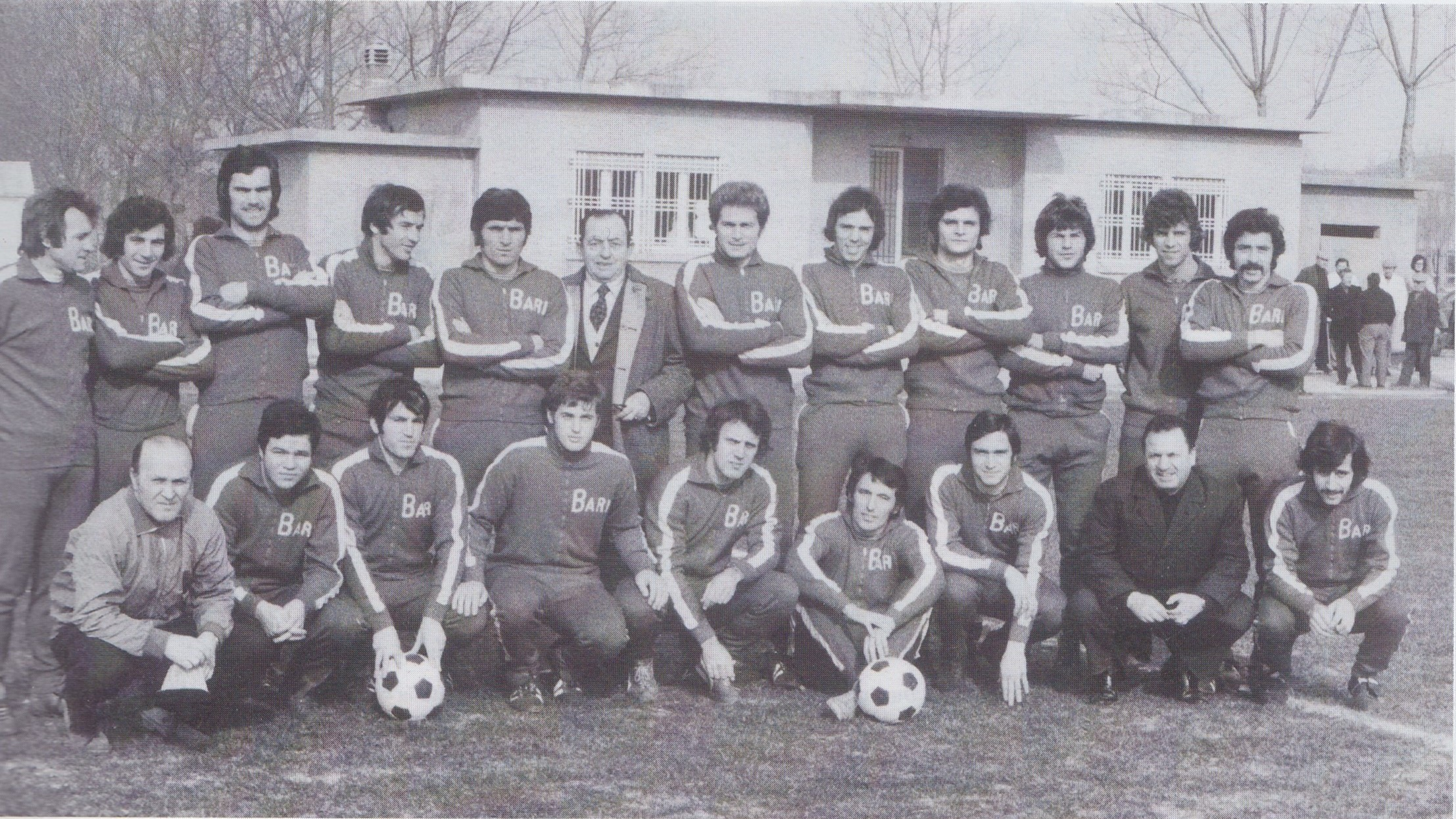
Carlo Regalia's Bari of the 1972-1973 season, which finished in 11th place in the Serie B table. From left, standing: Regalia, Sigarini, Casarsa, Galli, Spimi, Albanese, Colombo, P. Loseto, Cazzola, Marcolini, Martini, Ardemagni; crouched: Chiesa, Tessarotto, Lopez, Butti, Consonni, Dalle Vedove, Generoso, Nitti and Florio.

In the summer of 1972 Toneatto finally left AS Bari, whose administration, in order to deal with its serious liquidity problems decided to sell about half of the squad (generally considered unprofitable by then) in order to invest in new young players, purchased from the lower categories, the choice of which was entrusted by De Palo to the new coach Carlo Regalia. Regalia's team ended the 1972-1973 season in mid-table (after finishing the first half of the season in fifth place) and satisfied the fans, so much so that it was remembered in future years as "the Bari of the green wave," to symbolically celebrate the success of the team, composed largely of young players. The same lineup (little tweaked in the summer market) was not confirmed in the 1973–1974 season, with Regalia resigning after collecting 5 points in 13 games and being replaced by Pirazzini, with whom the galletti, although improving their performance, relegated to the penultimate place in the standings, with 12 goals scored and 26 conceded in 38 games.

In Serie C, Bari finished the 1974-1975 championship in second place, one point behind Catania, and the following one in third (Pirazzini remained on the biancorossa bench until the ninth day of the 1975–1976 season); in 1976-1977, coach Giacomo Losi led the Apulians to a first-place finish (they returned to Serie B after three years). In the same 1977, De Palo, admitting that he "could no longer do it alone," agreed to the entry of the duo Mincuzzi-Gironda (both wealthy capitalists from Bari) into the biancorossa club, planning with the two friends a more modern set-up of the club and a strengthening of the youth academy (they themselves anticipated financing for important operations). On Mincuzzi's initiative Carlo Regalia was called as the new sporting director, whose experience was considered useful in the restructuring of the youth academy. De Palo never saw the biancorossi in the top division again: in fact, he died in August '77, after 16 years as president. Vittorio Spimi had left the club in 1976.

== The Matarrese Era ==
=== The first four years and the Coppa Italia Primavera (1977-1981) ===
The honorable Antonio Matarrese took De Palo's place; with him began the long era of the Matarrese family at the helm of A.S. Bari.

Antonio, while investing heavily to strengthen the team, did not achieve promotion to the Serie A.

In the years 1977-1978 and 1978-1979 the galletti changed coaches five times (two in the first and three in the second season; Losi, initially confirmed for the second division, was relieved of his post in mid-January 1978), achieving salvation in the last days of the championship in both seasons. In 1979-80, led by coach Antonio Renna, the biancorossi ended the season in mid-table and 17-year-old Gigi De Rosa from Bari made his debut in the first team (2 appearances). In the '80-'81 season (with the team still coached by Renna) Maurizio Iorio and Aldo Serena wore the red and white jersey, who finished the championship with 10 goals each. During the same season Renna resigned and was replaced by "Primavera" coach Enrico Catuzzi, who with 5 wins in 11 games saved the galletti for the second time. In the meantime, the "Primavera" team captained by Gigi De Rosa (and led precisely by Catuzzi and then by Giuseppe Materazzi), won the Coppa Italia Primavera by beating Evani and Incocciati's Milan 2–0 in the final.

=== Bari "of the Bari people" (1981-1983) ===
For the 1981–1982 season, the management reconfirmed Catuzzi as coach and supported the Emilian, who wanted to start the Serie B championship with a good part of the youngsters of the "Primavera" team, who shortly before had won the Coppa Italia Primavera (beating AC Milan in the final), winning the first trophy in Bari's football history.

This young Bari team obtained four draws in four matches in the five-team preliminary round in the Coppa Italia, three of which were against top division teams (including Ruud Krol's Napoli, which scored 6 points and was admitted to the round of 16); finishing second, it did not advance to the next round. The satisfactions came above all in the league: Catuzzi was among the first to experiment in Italy with the "total zone," and the team exhibited a fine and offensive soccer, considered successful, producing good results including a series of 13 consecutive positive results for a total of 21 points. The results and the level of play of Catuzzi's Bari surprised at the national level. The enthusiastic city rallied around the team and the "della Vittoria" was almost always sold out. The main striker was Maurizio Iorio; around him revolved Bagnato and Gigi De Rosa, who that year earned a call-up to the Italian National Under-21 team. At the end of the season the galletti had scored 45 points, with the third best attack in Serie B (47 goals, with 18 goals scored by Iorio, who was the second highest scorer in the league); they lost the championship by two points. Decisive were the team's several missteps and some refereeing oversights. Precisely because of the consistent presence of very young Bari players on the team, that Bari team was labeled "The Bari of the Bari people" and is considered one of the best Bari teams ever.

In the following season the core of the team remained almost the same (Iorio was sold). In the Coppa Italia Bari finished the first round as leaders, with nine points, after beating Causio's Inter and Virdis' Udinese, both won by a 1–0 scoreline. However, having met Italian champion Juventus (then coached by Trapattoni) in the round of 16, the galletti were eliminated after the "lady" won the first leg, in Turin, 1-0 and drew 1–1 in the return leg, in Bari. In the league, after a good start, the biancorossi had a fluctuating performance and lost many matches. Catuzzi was replaced by Gigi Radice (former Milan coach) with 13 days to go, but despite a decent start, he failed to save Bari from relegation to Serie C. Several penalty kicks were missed in that year, in matches that were crucial for salvation. After relegation, many players were sold, including Bagnato and Caricola, who went to Juventus.

=== Bolchi's ascent, Salvemini's arrival and the Mitropa Cup (1983-1990) ===
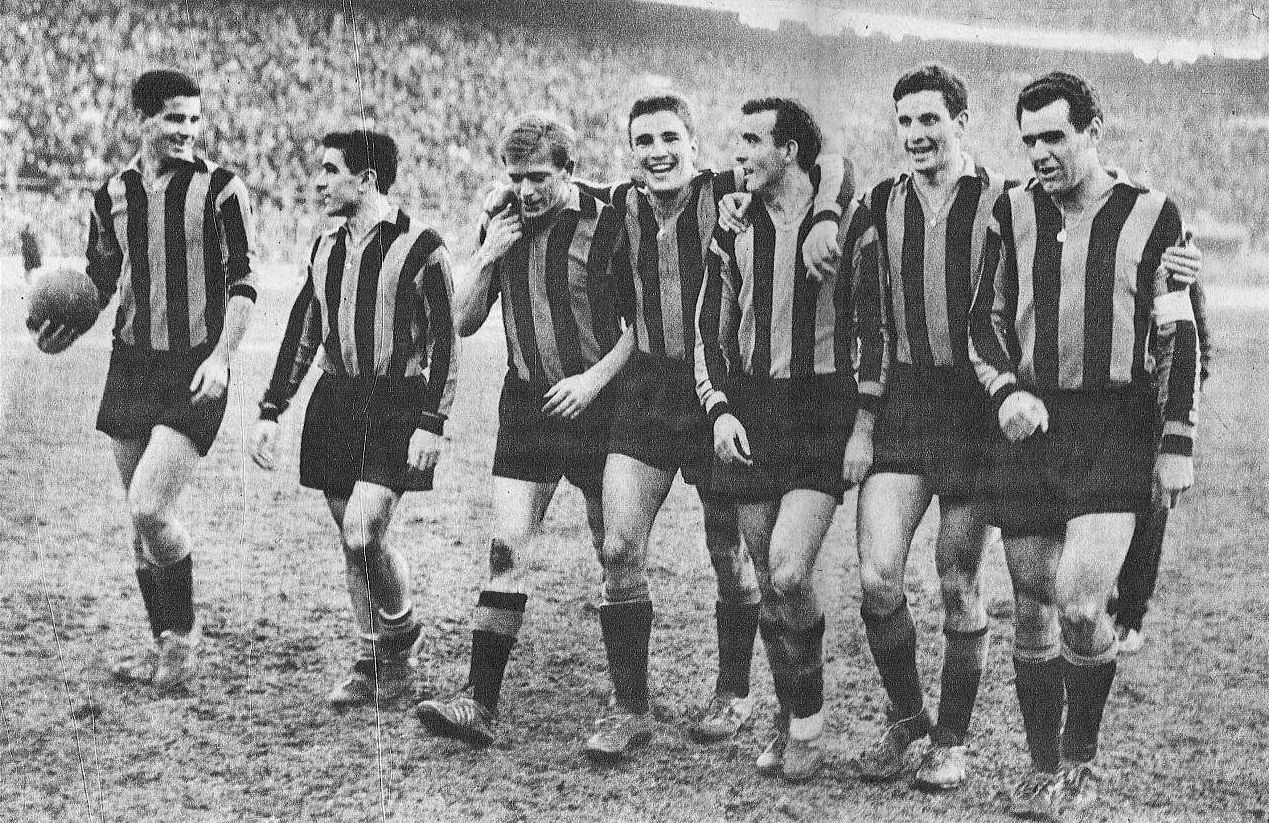
Bruno Bolchi (first from right, known as Maciste), in charge of Bari from 1983 to 1986, coached the club back to the top flight after 15 years.

In 1983, the Mincuzzi-Gironda group left the Bari club, selling its share to the Matarrese. Antonio Matarrese, increasingly involved in politics and sports, passed the role of president to his brother Vincenzo.

For the 1983–84 season V. Matarrese and sports director Franco Janich decided to rely on Bruno Bolchi for the technical leadership of the team: that season proved satisfactory.

Successes were also achieved in the Coppa Italia where the team, after finishing the six-team group in the lead with Juventus, with which it drew 2-2, eliminated in the round of 16 precisely the Piedmontese as a result of the now famous 2–1 win in Turin in the first match and the 2-2 earned at home in the return (in which Trapattoni's Juventus played Rossi and Platini, who won the Scudetto and the Cup Winners' Cup in the same 1984). In the quarterfinals, the galletti defeated Oriali's and Antognoni's Fiorentina, winning 2-1 both home and away, but were then eliminated in the semifinals by Osvaldo Bagnoli's Verona (later Italian champion the following year), after losing 1–2 in the first leg at home and 1–3 in the return. Due to these prestigious results, Bari thus holds the record, along with Alessandria in the 2015-2016 edition, as the only team playing in the third tier of the Italian football league system that came within a step of the Italian Cup final.

The biancorossi also participated in the Coppa Italia of Serie C in which, after beating Casarano in the double round, they were eliminated in the round of 16 by Taranto.

1990 Mitropa Cup Final

May 21, 1990 - Stadio della Vittoria, Bari
SSC Bari - Genoa CFC 1-0

- Bari: Mannini, Loseto, Carbone (88' Amoruso), Terracenere (67' Lupo), Righetti, Brambati, Perrone, Urbano, João Paulo, Gérson, Scarafoni (61' Paolo Monelli).
- Coach: Gaetano Salvemini.
- Genoa: Braglia, Ferroni, Caricola, Ruotolo, Collovati, Signorini, Eranio (87' Covelli), Florin, Fontolan, Urban, Rotella.
- Coach: Franco Scoglio.
- Referee: Branko Bujic.
- Scorer: 14' Perrone.
- Spectators: 3,600 approx.

— https://www.rsssf.org/tablesm/mit90.html

In the league, Bolchi's men remained at the top of the standings until the end, dominating with 45 points and a record of 16 wins and 5 losses (the least beaten team in the tournament), as well as the best attack in the division (40 goals). It was Giovanni Loseto's first-team debut season; the last Bari season for L. De Rosa. Bolchi's men continued the following year in the second division, finishing third with 49 points and reaching Serie A on the last day, thanks to a 2–0 home win against Pescara. Striker Edi Bivi (in Bari from 1984 to 1987) was the tournament's top scorer that year, with 20 goals.

Ahead of the 1985-1986 championship in the top division, Gordon Cowans (Aston Villa director and English national team player) and Paul Rideout (young promise of the English Under-21) were signed. The season in Serie A, played with a squad full of debutants in the top division, saw Bari relegated to the penultimate place.

The association with Milan's Bolchi, who led a consecutive promotion from Serie C and brought Bari back to A after a 15-year wait, also ended. At the end of the 1986 season Cavasin also left.

Bari thus spent three years in the second division, and after the first two under the leadership of the already well-known Catuzzi, in which they again narrowly missed promotion to A, in 1988 (the year Rideout and Cowans left) Gaetano Salvemini went on to coach the team, leading the biancorossi to win the 1988-89 Serie B championship (on equal points with Genoa, who had a better goal difference). In the summer of 1989, Brazilians Gérson Caçapa and João Paulo arrived; the latter soon became an idol of the fans and is one of the most remembered players. Under Salvemini, in the 1989–1990 season the team came close to the UEFA zone in the middle of the championship and then ended the competition in 10th place, showcasing the class of center-forwards Joao Paulo and Maiellaro (the latter in the biancorossi since '87). By virtue of their placement in Serie B in the previous year, Bari participated in the spring of 1990 in the Mitropa Cup tournament where, after advancing through the qualifiers, they won the final in Bari on May 21, beating Genoa 1-0 (the goal was scored by Perrone in the 14th minute of the first half). The Mitropa Cup was Bari's first international trophy.

The Mitropa Cup final was also the last official match played at the historic Stadio della Vittoria. On the evening of June 3, 1990, with the friendly Bari-Milan won 2–0 by the galletti, the new San Nicola Stadium - which that summer hosted several matches of 1990 World Cup - was inaugurated.

=== The 1990s (1990-2001) ===
==== Alternation between Serie A and Serie B (1990-1996) ====
During 1990–1992, the red-and-whites' management implemented an onerous buying campaign; David Platt stands out among the athletes recruited in the summer of 1991, so far the biggest purchase in the red-and-whites' history (the purchase of the English centre-forward from Aston Villa for 12 billion euros delighted the fans). The onerous buying campaign of '91 resulted in a record 21,912 season tickets at the S. Nicola. However, the results did not come: the 1990–91 season, which ended with salvation achieved on the penultimate day, was followed by 1991–92, where on the third day Joao Paulo was seriously injured, remaining inactive for the entire year, and with 2 points obtained after 5 days Salvemini resigned. New coach Boniek failed to save the team, despite a good start in the second round. At the end of the championship Platt left and Sandro Tovalieri and Igor Protti were bought, who would become idols of the fans.

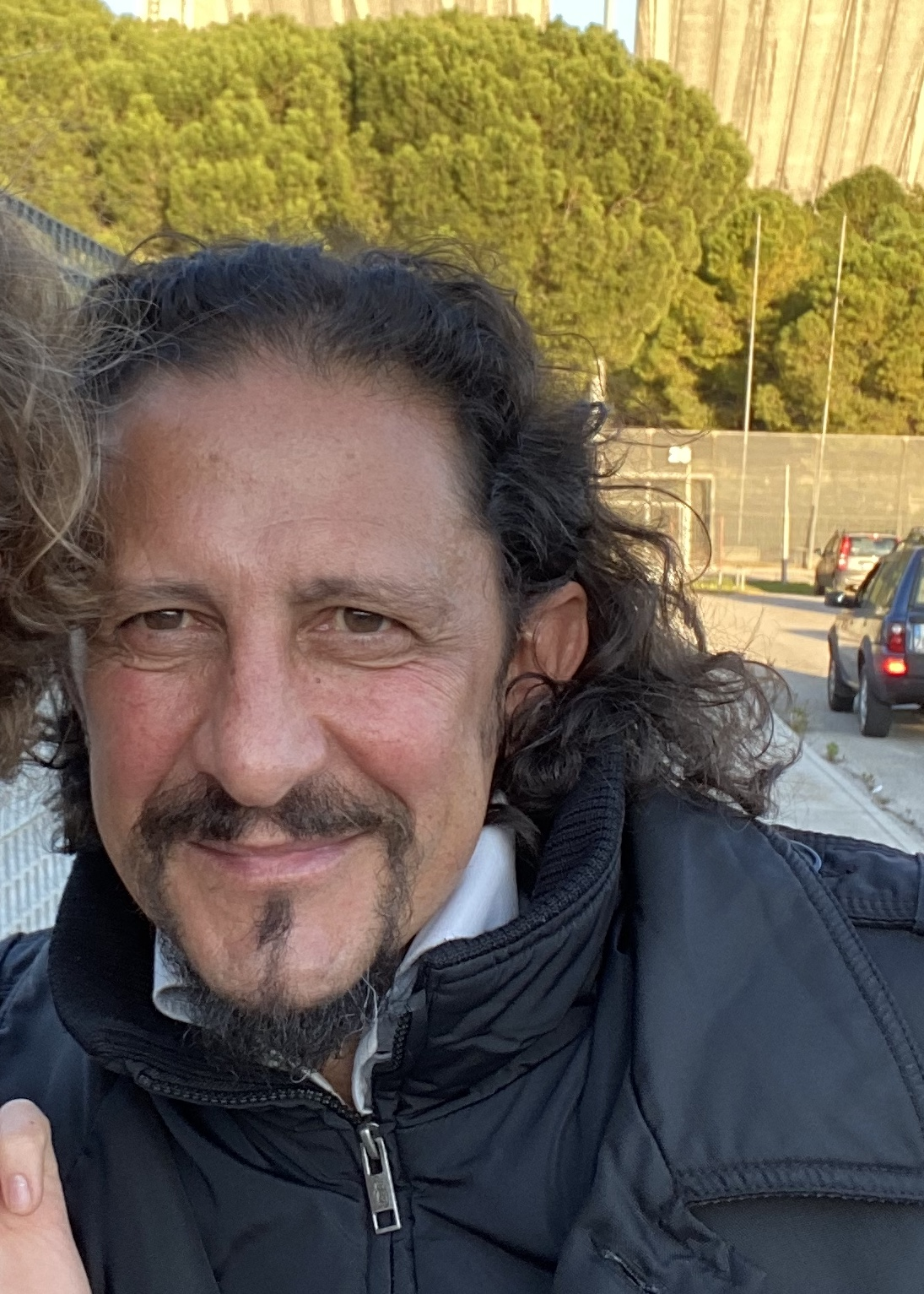
Igor Protti, 1995-1996 Serie A top scorer.

In the years that followed, the club became much more scrupulous and thrifty on the market. It was also characterised by the discovery of young talent. In 1993 Giovanni Loseto moved to Pescara, and in '94 João Paulo returned to Brazil.

After the 1992–1993 season under Lazaroni, in 1993-1994 Bari finished 2nd in the league and was promoted to Serie A with Giuseppe Materazzi as coach. The team had a good 1994–1995 season in the top division, in which striker Tovalieri stood out (17 goals), but the following year (which saw the departure of Tovalieri and the arrival of Luigi Sala, Klas Ingesson and Kennet Andersson), despite the prolific attacking pair Protti-Andersson (36 goals between the two), the team conceded many goals and lost several matches to direct rivals, relegating again. When the championship was over, Protti (who was top scorer with 24 goals that year) and K. Andersson left.

Bari was the first team in the history of the top division to relegate despite having the top scorer in its ranks.

==== Return and permanence in the top division (1996-2001) ====
In the 1996-1997 season, the team, coached by the experienced Eugenio Fascetti (who took over from Materazzi midway through the 1995-1996 championship, due to the results crisis) and reinforced with Gigi Garzya and Diego De Ascentis immediately returned to Serie A (despite a downturn that began in February and lasted until Easter, with many newspapers giving for certain the exclusion from the promotion zone and a strong protest by the fans). Gianluca Zambrotta and goalkeeper Franco Mancini arrived in the capital, and the team discretely disputed its first three seasons in Serie A, navigating in the mid-low standings with a “man-to-man” 1-3-4-2 (the libero was Gaetano De Rosa, in Bari since 1997) that made the Bari crowd feel somewhat relieved. In these years, also thanks to a consolidated relationship between the coach and Regalia, Bari confirmed itself as a club capable of discovering and enhancing several players, such as Phil Masinga (signed in 1997 from Salernitana, scored 11 goals in the 1998–1999 season) and Nicola Ventola (coming from Bari's youth sector), reaching salvation. In 1998 Ventola, Sala and Ingesson left, while Yksel Osmanovski, Daniel Andersson and Gionatha Spinesi arrived. Bari finished the 1998-1999 season in 10th place in the league with 42 points and consequently qualified for the Intertoto Cup; the club, in agreement with coach Fascetti, decided not to participate in the European competition.

In 1999 De Ascentis and Zambrotta packed their bags, while Simone Perrotta made his debut. On the night of December 18, 1999, in the Bari-Inter match, a 17-year-old Bari debutant from the youth academy named Antonio Cassano scored the winning goal against the nerazzurri (2–1), thus beginning his international limelight.

In the summer of 2000 Garzya and F. Mancini quarreled with Fascetti and Matarrese and terminated their contracts with Bari. The young Belgian goalkeeper Jean-François Gillet (who alternated with the other three goalkeepers that year) was bought. The situation in the league worsened and the fans escalated their protests against the management, due to the strong results crisis. Fascetti was fired midway through the second half of the season, at the center of a controversy with the organized fans, in which the Tuscan coach defended the club. Bari were relegated after finishing bottom of the table, having played their fourth successive season in Serie A.

When the championship was over, Cassano was sold to Roma for 60 billion lire (about 30 million euros today, so far the most profitable sale for the Bari club). The 2001 championship was the last for D. Andersson, Osmanovski, Masinga and Perrotta.

=== From the crisis in Serie B to the arrival of Conte (2001-2008) ===
Unlike previous times, the galletti did not immediately return to the top flight and the fluctuating performance, from 6th to 21st place in two seasons, led to a significant drop in spectators. In the Bari-Cittadella match on April 21, 2002, the S. Nicola had 52 paying fans, an all-time low. Various coaches followed one another on the biancorossi's bench.

In the 2003–2004 season, despite the fact that the Venetian coach Bepi Pillon, who took over at the start of the season, had managed to revive the Apulian side and win over the fans, the team finished fourth from bottom and was relegated to Serie C1 on June 19, 2004, due to the 2–0 defeat suffered in the away match against Venezia, after having beaten them 1–0 in the first match. A few days after relegation, due to the bankruptcy of Napoli, Bari was promoted back to Serie B. Also in 2004, Spinesi (author of 52 goals in six years) and De Rosa left the team and Vincenzo Santoruvo and Alessandro Gazzi joined. The following years saw the galletti, coached by Guido Carboni, stabilize in the mid-table area (10th place in 2005 and 13th place in 2006). The start of the 2006–2007 season of the Rolando Maran-branded Bari was positive; after some successes, the Trentino coach, deprived in the January market of several players, was fired at the end of February 2007 after a streak of negative results. Maran was succeeded by former Beppe Materazzi (11 seasons after his winter 1995 farewell), who saved the team with a day to spare, ending the season in 11th place.

In November 2007, a membership campaign for the "CompriamolA" popular shareholding was launched by a group of fans, but the initiative received insufficient finances for the purpose.

In June 2007, Giorgio Perinetti, coming from Siena, became sporting director. In the 2007-2008 championship, after an intermittent trend of results and the 0–4 home defeat in the derby against Lecce (the result with the widest gap in the history of matches between the two rival teams), on December 28 Materazzi resigned as coach; Antonio Conte was called in his place. Under Conte's technical guidance, aided by several market interventions, the team's performance improved and the galletti placed eleventh in the league standings at the end of the season. Matarrese and Perinetti, satisfied with the results, decided to bet again on Conte to revitalize the team, and the Salento coach obtained a contract extension to 2009.

On January 15, 2008, the club celebrated 100 years of history, celebrating with fans and old stars at the Teatro Team in Bari.

=== Serie B top spot, two years in Serie A and relegation (2008-2011) ===
In October 2008, the Matarrese sold 10 percent of the share capital of A.S. Bari to Bari builders De Bartolomeo.

The summer market for the 2008–2009 season saw the arrival of defender Andrea Ranocchia and forward Paulo Vitor Barreto, among others. The galletti had a positive championship, and critics appreciated Conte's fast-paced 4–4–2, devoted to attack and marked by breakthrough passes, fast counter-attacking and wing play. Promotion was arithmetically achieved on May 8, 2009, four days ahead of the end of the championship, helped by the defeat of contender Livorno in the 38th day's advance. On May 30, 2009, after the last championship match won 4–1 against Treviso, Bari celebrated promotion to Serie A at the “San Nicola” by winning the Wings of Victory Cup as league winners. The final standings saw Bari in first place with 80 points (for the second time in its history after the 1941-42 season), 65 goals scored (including 23 scored by Barreto, for the best attack in the league along with Parma) and 35 conceded (second best defense).

Following the consensual termination of contract between Antonio Conte and the club (due to disagreements on market strategy), for the following championship the team was entrusted to Gian Piero Ventura.

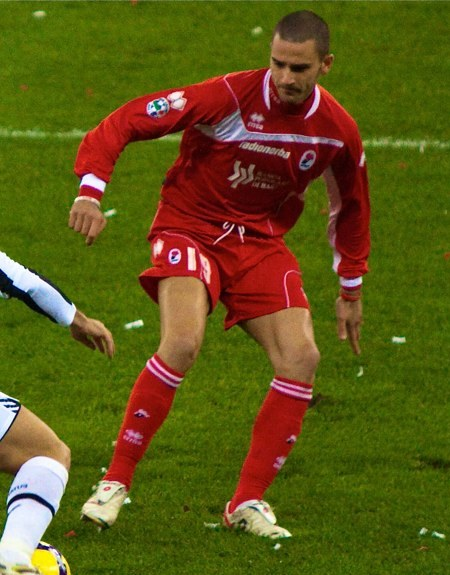
Defender Leonardo Bonucci wore the Bari shirt in the 2009–2010 season, which culminated in him being called up for the 2010 World Cup.

In the summer market arrived the young defender Leonardo Bonucci. In the 2009-10 championship, the team produced good results and at the end of the first round was in the UEFA Europa League zone, with the second best defense (18 goals conceded), and was admired by experts for its lively play, similar to the style shown by Conte's Bari the previous season, but suffered two downturns in the second round and ended the competition in tenth place with 50 points: a record for the team in the top single-round championship. After years in Serie B, fans were finally satisfied and many called Ventura's team “the best Bari ever.”

On May 8, 2010, sporting director Perinetti (one of those responsible for the positive changes in the last three years) announced his farewell to the club to return to Siena; the Roman sporting director would state in an interview given in November 2012 that Matarrese themselves asked him to leave the club.

In July Bari was ranked 290th in the IFFHS ranking for club teams.

In the summer market, Ranocchia and Bonucci (called up to the national team for the 2010 World Cup in South Africa) were sold. The 2010–2011 season, after a good start was marked from the 6th day by a regressive phase, in which the galletti strung together a series of defeats and an increase of injured players(with 6 points obtained in 19 games). The club was eliminated in the round of 16 of the Coppa Italia by AC Milan (as a result of a 3–0 loss suffered at San Siro). On February 11, 2011, Ventura terminated his contract in agreement with the club, after a harsh fan protest against him, and was replaced by Bortolo Mutti, who despite a partial improvement did not avoid relegation to Serie B (which occurred four days in advance). The “biancorossi” ended the championship by winning 4–0 at home against Bologna, with three of the four goals scored by Grandolfo; this was the largest away win in Bari's history in Serie A, and Grandolfo was the first Bari player to score a hat-trick in a Serie A away match. Subsequently, a number of matches from this season, including the direct rescue clashes against Lecce, Cesena and Sampdoria, were found to have been manipulated as a result of match-fixing, and many Bari players (as well as some organized supporters) were investigated and prosecuted while Andrea Masiello, who admitted to voluntarily scoring the own goal for money in the derby lost to Lecce, was arrested for betting and sports fraud. On March 4, 2011, Bari reached the milestone of 1,000 matches played in Serie A.

=== The last years of the Matarrese era and bankruptcy (2011-2014) ===
On June 13, 2011, president Vincenzo Matarrese and the club's entire board of directors resigned after 28 years of management; from this moment on, although the Matarrese family owned 90 percent of the club's share capital, they no longer managed the club directly.

Also to cope with the club's financial straits, almost the entire squad was dismantled (Barreto and Gazzi were also sold). Goalkeeper Gillet, for 10 years in the club and a longtime team captain, left Bari. The team was put in the hands of coach Vincenzo Torrente and refounded mainly on youngsters. The next two championships with Torrente, with a deduction of 6 points in the 2011-2012 season and 7 points in the 2012-2013 season (penalties imposed due to the late payment of salaries to athletes and the verdicts of the soccer betting trial), saw the galletti finish in mid-table; the performances of a number of young recruits were deemed satisfactory. In the two aforementioned seasons, the San Nicola stadium recorded a new drop in spectators.

In June 2013 Torrente resigned, and after two weeks under the technical guidance of Carmine Gautieri, who also resigned, the Bari squad was entrusted to Roberto Alberti Mazzaferro, assisted by Nunzio Zavettieri and Giovanni Loseto. The Matarrese reduced the amount of money poured into the club, which, indebted like other businesses in the family holding company (in February 2014 Bari's debt would amount to about 30 million euros), enacted self-management and at the same time sought buyers.

In early 2014, the club was in serious danger of bankruptcy (and some creditors foreclosed parts of the company's assets), while negotiations for its sale were stalled or closed; in February of the same year, the fans, who had already clearly demanded a change of ownership for the team the previous year, demonstrated in favor of a timely “self-bankruptcy” of the club, to make it possible for Bari Calcio to retain the sports title, a solution also advocated earlier, by the mayor of Bari Michele Emiliano. Having found that it was impossible to settle the club's debts, A.S. Bari's shareholders' meeting authorized its self-bankruptcy, officially declared on March 10, 2014; the football club was entrusted to two insolvency administrators, who provided for the settlement of debts and auctioned off the company, including the sports title and player base, the youth teams, and various movable assets.

== FC Bari 1908 (2014-2018) ==
At the third bankruptcy auction for the purchase of the Bari Calcio company, held on May 20 with a base price lowered to two million (from the initial 4.3 million), Football Club Bari 1908, represented by former referee Gianluca Paparesta, was awarded the company's assets previously belonging to A.S. Bari for 4.8 million euros; three days later the purchase contract was signed.

In the league, the team, which was supported by an ever-growing number of fans after bankruptcy, as a result of its seventh-place finish obtained with a great comeback in the second half of the season, qualified for Serie A promotion play-offs, where it was knocked out in the semi-finals by Latina, who finished higher in the standings, after a double tie.

The new club implemented several changes from the previous management, but the team's performance fell short of expectations. The biancorossi qualified for the play-offs for Serie A in the 2015-2016 season, coached by Andrea Camplone, but were defeated 3–4 by Novara in the preliminary match played at San Nicola. In the summer of 2015, the club sold centre-forward Francesco Caputo, who had been with the club since 2008 (loaned to Salernitana in 2009–2010) and scored 48 goals in 150 appearances.

On June 3, 2016, businessman Cosmo Antonio Giancaspro, until then a minority shareholder in the club, obtained the majority of the shares as the sole underwriter of the €7.5 million capital increase, which had been previously approved by the shareholders' meeting (thus, Paparesta lost substantial control of the company); on June 22 of the same year, the shareholders' meeting appointed Giancaspro as sole director representing his “Kreare Impresa Srl.”

On 16 July 2018, after a year in which they finished in seventh place and were eliminated in the first round of the playoffs by Cittadella, with Fabio Grosso at the helm, the team was expelled from the Serie B championship due to a lack of recapitalisation and past debts, and went bankrupt after four years of operation. Unlike in 2014, they also lost their sports title for the first time in 88 years, due to the difficulty of finding a suitable new business group in a short time.

== The De Laurentiis family (since 2018) ==
On July 31, 2018, Bari Mayor Antonio Decaro entrusted the Serie D sports title, granted by the FIGC because of the club's sporting tradition, to Aurelio De Laurentiis' Filmauro.

The team, coached by Giovanni Cornacchini, gained promotion to Serie C two days in advance as a result of finishing first in Group I. During the 2019-2020 Serie C championship, Bari switched from Cornacchini to Vincenzo Vivarini, who led the team to second place in Group C of the league: the team missed out on promotion to the second division after losing 1–0 to Reggio Audace in the play-off final, despite recording 27 consecutive positive results between the league and the play-offs. The following year, which was more difficult, Gaetano Auteri, Massimo Carrera and Auteri again took turns at the helm, leading the team to fourth place in the league and the subsequent play-offs, in which Bari eliminated Foggia but were eliminated in the first round of the national play-offs by Feralpisalò.

In the 2021–2022 season, the team coached by Michele Mignani and strengthened by the addition of a number of experienced recruits, remained at the top of the standings from the start of the championship and were promoted to Serie B three rounds before the end of the regular season, returning to the top flight after a four-year absence due to the bankruptcy of Bari 1908. Newly promoted to the second division, the team had an excellent season in 2022–23, finishing third and qualifying for the play-offs for promotion to the top flight; in the play-offs they eliminated Südtirol in the semi-finals, then lost the final to Cagliari (1–1 in Sardinia and 0–1 at San Nicola).

== See also ==
- 2023–24 SSC Bari season

== Bibliography ==
- Antonucci, Gianni (1977). Bari si, Bari no: settanta anni di storia biancorossa. Roma: Vivere in.
- Antonucci, Gianni (1984). Il Bari dei Matarrese. Bari: Laterza.
- Antonucci, Gianni (1998). 1908-1998: 90 anni di Bari. Bari: Uniongrafica Corcelli.
