= 2003–04 AS Bari season =

A.S. Bari
2003–04 season
- Chairman: Vincenzo Matarrese
- Manager: Marco Tardelli; Giuseppe Pillon
- Stadium: Stadio San Nicola
- Serie B: 21st
- Coppa Italia: First round
- Top goalscorer: Nicolás Córdova (12); Gionatha Spinesi (12)

During the 2003–04 Italian football season, A.S. Bari competed in the Serie B.

== Season summary ==
Bari were expected to make a bid for an immediate return to the Serie A, but struggled all season. Manager Marco Tardelli was sacked and replaced by Giuseppe Pillon, who led the team to a secure but disappointing 21st place finish.

== Kit ==
A.S. Bari's kit was manufactured by Italian sports retailer Lotto and sponsored by Pasta Ambra.

== Squad ==
Note: Flags indicate national team as defined under FIFA eligibility rules; some limited exceptions apply. Players may hold more than one non-FIFA nationality.

No.	Pos.	Nation	Player
1	GK	ITA	Graziano Battistini
2	DF	ITA	Marco Candrina
3	DF	ITA	Giuseppe Ingrosso
4	DF	ITA	Gaetano De Rosa
7	MF	ITA	Mattia Collauto
8	MF	ITA	Antonio La Fortezza
10	MF	CHI	Nicolás Córdova
11	MF	URU	Marcelo Lipatin
13	MF	ITA	Carlo Cardascio
14	MF	SUI	Lionel Pizzinat
15	DF	ITA	Nicola Mora
16	MF	ITA	Antonio Bellavista
18	DF	CHI	Alex von Schwedler
19	FW	ITA	Luigi Anaclerio
20	MF	CHI	Jaime Valdés

No.	Pos.	Nation	Player
21	GK	ITA	Vitangelo Spadavecchia
22	MF	ARG	Diego Markic
23	DF	ITA	Emanuele Brioschi
24	FW	ITA	Gionatha Spinesi
26	MF	ITA	Pasquale Berardi
27	DF	SEN	Diaw Doudou
28	DF	ITA	Domenico Creanza
29	FW	NGA	Ugochukwu Enyinnaya
77	FW	ITA	Simone Motta
79	MF	ITA	Luca Brambilla

== Serie B ==
Pos	Team	Pld	W	D	L	GF	GA	GD	Pts	Promotion or relegation
19	Hellas Verona	46	13	14	19	54	65	−11	53	
20	Venezia (O)	46	12	15	19	40	57	−17	51	Qualification for Relegation play-offs
21	Bari (Note: Relegated after relegation play-off and later readmitted in place of Napoli.) (T)	46	13	11	22	50	63	−13	50	Spared from relegation
22	Pescara (Note: Relegated and later readmitted after newly relegated Ancona's bankruptcy.) (T)	46	11	13	22	46	69	−23	46	Spared from relegation
23	Avellino (R)	46	8	13	25	51	69	−18	37	Relegation to Serie C1

Source: Almanacco Illustrato del Calcio - La Storia 1898-2004, Panini Edizioni, Modena, September 2005
Rules for classification: 1) points; 2) head-to-head points; 3) head-to-head goal difference; 4) head-to-head goals scored; 5) goal difference; 6) number of goals scored.
(O) Play-off winners; (R) Relegated; (T) Qualified, but not yet for the particular phase indicated
