= Salvatore Mastronunzio =

Italian footballer (born 1979)

Personal information
- Date of birth: 5 September 1979 (age 47)
- Place of birth: Empoli, Italy
- Height: 1.79 m (5 ft 10 1/2 in)
- Position: Forward

Youth career
- –1997: Empoli

Senior career*
Years	Team	Apps	(Gls)
1997–1999	Empoli	2	(0)
1998–1999	→ ASD Stuoie Baracca Lugo (loan)	6	(0)
1999–2001	Cavese	0	(0)
2000–2001	→ Rondinella (loan)	26	(8)
2001–2002	Empoli	0	(0)
2002–2003	Fermana	33	(12)
2003–2004	Ascoli	24	(2)
2004–2007	Frosinone	72	(24)
2006–2007	→ Foggia (loan)	13	(4)
2007–2010	Ancona	119	(59)
2010–2012	Siena	34	(9)
2011–2012	→ Spezia (loan)	13	(1)
2012	→ Gubbio (loan)	10	(0)
2015–2016	Siena	14	(3)
2017	Crevalcore		
2017–2019	Anconitana		
2019–2021	Montefano		
2021–2022	Maceratese		

International career
1995–1996	Italy U16	2	(0)
- * Club domestic league appearances and goals

Salvatore Mastronunzio (born 5 September 1979) is an Italian former footballer who played as a forward.

== Club career ==
=== Early career ===
Born in Empoli, Tuscany, Mastronunzio started his career at Empoli F.C. He made his Serie A debut on 8 March 1998 against Bari. He replaced Max Tonetto in the 64th minute to strengthen the attack but the team lost 0–2 away. He also played the next round, substituted Claudio Bonomi in the last minutes.

Mastronunzio graduated from Primavera team in 1998, then spent 3 season loaned to several Serie C teams. (Italian third and fourth highest divisions) In mid-2002, he left for Serie C1 club Fermana and scored 12 league goals. In June 2003, he was signed by Serie B club Ascoli in co-ownership deal from Fermana. He mainly played as substitute player and only scored 2 goals in his first Serie B season.

=== Frosinone ===
In June 2004 Fermana bought back Mastronunzio and re-sold to Serie C1 side Frosinone along with Guido Di Deo. He reached the promotion playoffs with club twice, and won the playoffs in 2006. However, he was excluded in Frosinone's Serie B plan, only made 4 Serie B appearances. In January 2007, he was loaned back to Serie C1 for Foggia with option to purchase.

=== Ancona ===
==== 2007–08 ====
In July 2007, he was signed by Serie C1 side Ancona for undisclosed fee, signed a 3-year contract. In the first season, he scored a career high of 15 league goals. He also scored 3 of the 5 goals of Ancona in promotion playoffs.

==== 2008–09 ====
In the next season, he scored 17 goals, his career high in Serie B. He also scored 2 goals in relegation playout against Rimini, made Ancona 2–1 won Rimini in aggregate and stayed in Serie B. Mastronunzio also scored a goal in the last round (4–3 AlbinoLeffe). Before the match Ancona had 46 points and was the third from bottom; Rimini 50 points; Pisa 48 points. The win made Ancona avoid from directly relegation (Pisa instead). However, in 2011 FIGC discovered the match was fixed.

==== 2009–10 ====
In 2009–10 season, partnered with Roberto Colacone, he scored 22 goals in Serie B and originally survived from be relegated. (but later went bankrupt and restart in Eccellenza) Mastronunzio also scored in the last round to become a protagonist. Again, Ancona had 51 points in round 41; Frosinone 52 points; Triestina 51 points; Padova 48 points; Mantova 47 points. Ancona still risked to play relegation play-out. Eventually, Mastronunzio scored a brace (opening goal; an equalizing goal) and 2–2 draw with Mantova. Mantova relegated directly and Ancona 1 point away from relegation "play-out qualifier Padova and Triestina. Nevertheless, the match was fixed.

=== Siena ===
In June 2010 he was signed by Siena for €2.15 million in 3-year contract. The team recently relegated from Serie A and sold their striker Massimo Maccarone to Palermo for €4.5M. Mastronunzio picked no.9 as shirt number. Mastronunzio made his club debut on 12 August 2010 in the second round of the Coppa Italia (Italian Cup) competition. He started the match and partnered with Emanuele Calaiò in the 2–0 won against Ternana. Siena advanced to the next round by winning 2–0. In the next 2 matches, Mastronunzio scored 1 goal each in the first 2 games of Serie B. He scored his 3rd goal of the season in Siena's 5th game of the season, in which Siena beat Atalanta to take the Serie B lead with 11 points. On 22 August 2011, Mastronunzio moved to Lega Pro club Spezia on loan with rights to full redemption at the end of the season.

=== Italian football scandal ===
He was under investigation for involvement in 2011–12 Italian football scandal since March 2012. The procurator request to ban him for 4 years and 6 months on 31 May but partially acquitted, thus reduced to 4 years, announced by National Discipline Committee of Italian Football Federation on 18 June 2012. The procurator found Ancona 1–0 AlbinoLeffe on 17 January 2009, as worse as the return leg on 30 May 2009 (AlbinoLeffe 3–4 Ancona, last round of 2008–09 Serie B; Mastronunzio scored once); Ancona 2–2 Mantova on 30 May 2010 (last match of 2009–10 Serie B; Mastronunzio scored a brace) was also fixed. Mastronunzio only acquitted for the first match. The ban was further reduced to 3 years by the Tribunale Nazionale di Arbitrato per lo Sport of Italian National Olympic Committee (CONI).

=== Return to Siena ===
On 12 October 2015 Mastronunzio was resigned by new Siena: S.S. Robur Siena on a free transfer.

== International career ==
Mastronunzio was capped for the U16 Azzurrini at 1996 UEFA European Under-16 Football Championship qualification. He replaced Alessandro Sgrigna and partnered with Massimo Maccarone on his debut match on 4 October 1995. That opening match of the qualification, Azzurrini 1–1 draw with Hungary. He played the 4th and last match against Israel, replacing Carlo Cardascio at half time and partnered with Maccarone and Riccardo Ramazzotti to strengthen the attack. However both team scored 1 goal in second half and ended in 1–1 draw and Israel advanced to the final tournament.
