= Marco Candrina =

Italian footballer (born 1982)

Personal information
- Date of birth: January 2, 1982 (age 44)
- Place of birth: Pavia, Italy
- Height: 1.76 m (5 ft 9 in)
- Position: Defender

Team information
- Current team: Pomigliano

Youth career
- Milan

Senior career*
Years	Team	Apps	(Gls)
–2002	Pavia	49	(0)
2002–2006	Bari	51	(0)
2006–2008	Pro Patria	58	(0)
2008–2010	A.S.D. Forza e Coraggio		
2010–2011	Foggia	18	(0)
2011–2012	Benevento	6	(0)
2012–2013	Campobasso	14	(0)
2013–	Pomigliano	15	(0)

International career
1998	Italy U-15	10	(0)
- * Club domestic league appearances and goals

Marco Candrina (born January 2, 1982, in Pavia) is an Italian professional football player. He currently plays for Pomigliano.

He has played for 4 seasons in the Serie B for A.S. Bari.
