= Pietro Magni (footballer) =

Italian footballer and manager

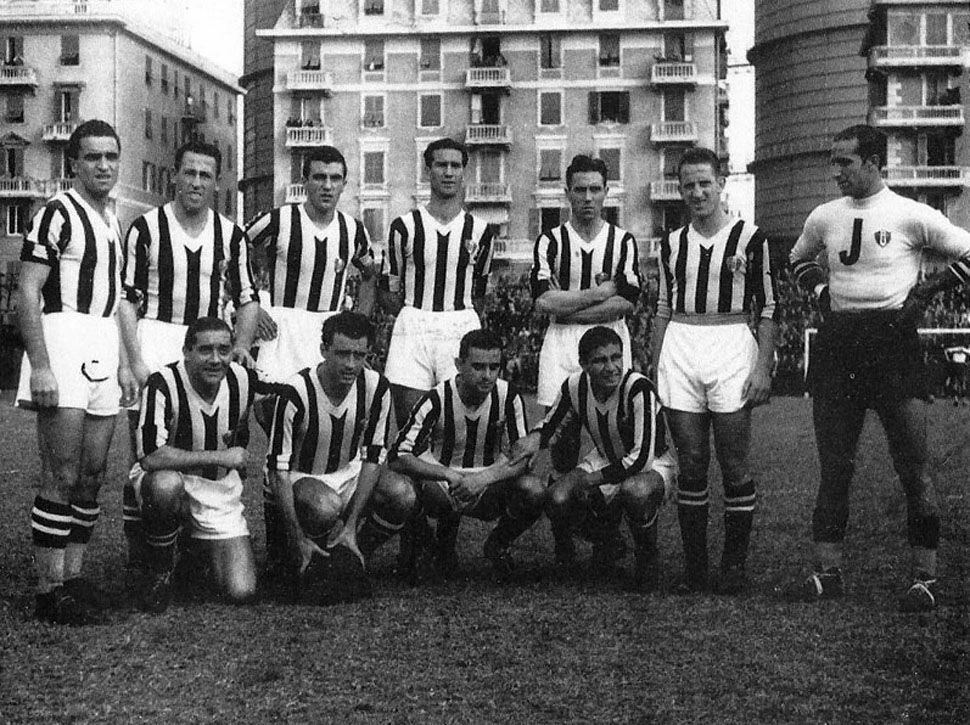
- Pietro Magni (back row, second from right) as part of Juventus in 1942

Personal information
- Full name: Pietro Magni
- Date of birth: 20 March 1919
- Place of birth: Bobbiate, Italy
- Date of death: 24 September 1992 (aged 73)
- Place of death: Bobbiate, Italy
- Position: Utility player

Senior career*
Years	Team	Apps	(Gls)
1937–1940	Varese	53	(9)
1940–1942	Liguria	45	(12)
1942–1948	Juventus	106	(27)
1948–1949	Lucchese	35	(1)
1949–1951	Genoa	38	(1)
1951–1953	Lecce	14	(1)
1953–1954	Cesena	16	(1)
Total		307	(52)

Managerial career
- 1952–1953: Lecce
- 1953–1954: Cesena
- 1958–1962: Pro Patria
- 1962–1963: Bari
- 1965–1966: Varese
- 1966–1967: Pavia
- 1969: Salernitana
- * Club domestic league appearances and goals

Pietro Magni (20 March 1919 – 24 September 1992) was an Italian football player and manager. As a player, Magni made 193 appearances in Serie A, the highest level of Italian football, and was capable of playing in several positions, although he primarily played as a central defensive midfielder. During a career spanning 14 years, he played for Varese, Liguria, Juventus, Lucchese, Genoa, Lecce and Cesena. It was in his second season with Lecce that Magni began his management career. He became player-manager and continued in that role at Cesena. Having retired from playing, Magni went on to manage Pro Patria, Bari, Varese, Pavia and Salernitana.

== Career ==
Magni began his career with Varese in 1937 and made 53 appearances in Serie C over the next three years, scoring nine goals. He joined Serie B club Liguria in 1940 – who would later become Sampdoria – and helped the club win promotion to Serie A in his first season, scoring 11 goals in 31 games. Having scored 12 times in 45 games for Liguria, Magni was transferred to Juventus in 1942. He scored ten league goals in his first season with Juventus, including four in one match – a 6–2 win against Triestina. He spent six years with the club, but only took part in four league campaigns due to the Second World War, which cancelled competitive football in Italy for two years. Magni scored 27 goals in 106 games for Juventus.

Having left Juventus in 1948, he spent a year with Lucchese and then another with Genoa – amassing 73 more appearances in Serie A. Magni dropped down to Serie C in 1951 to join Lecce, where he began his managerial career. Having made ten appearances in his first season with the club, he was appointed as player-manager for the 1952–53 campaign. Lecce narrowly avoided relegation to Serie D – Magni played in four matches – and he left the club in 1953. He finished his playing career with Cesena, where he also served as player-manager, and appeared in Serie D for the first time, scoring once in 16 appearances. Magni left Cesena in 1954 and did not manage again for another four years.

Magni returned to management in 1958 with Serie C side Pro Patria and the club won promotion to Serie B in the 1959–60 season under his stewardship. Having guided them to top-half finishes in Serie B over the next two years, Magni joined Bari in 1962. The club won promotion to Serie A during his first season in charge. Magni left the club in 1963 and spent the next two years away from management. He returned to Varese in 1965, who were now a Serie A club. The club finished bottom of the table during the 1965–66 season and were relegated. He joined Pavia in 1966 and managed them for a season before spending another two years away from the job. He finished his managerial career with a brief stint at Serie C side Salernitana in 1969.
