= Noordin Ahmad =

- Born: 23 October 1957 (age 68); Penang, Malaysia
- Occupation: Businessman

Noordin bin Ahmad (Jawi: نوردين بن احمد; born 23 October 1957) is a Malaysian businessman in defense, property and oil tycoon. According to him, for 20 years he worked for the Malaysian branch of Finmeccanica (now known as Leonardo S.p.A.), a global company that specializes in the aerospace, defense and security sectors and is headquartered in Rome. Noordin claims he served the company as an advisor. Some claim that he played a role in Malaysia’s military dealings with Italy in this position.

In April 2016 he signed a preliminary agreement to acquire 50% shares of F.C. Bari 1908 from owner and 95% shareholder of the football club, Gianluca Paparesta. In May he announced the establishment of a football academy with facilities in Italy and Malaysia to train youth players. However, the deal was never completed for some issues of money laundering by his Italian counterpart.
