= András Kuttik =

Hungarian footballer (1896–1970)

Personal information
- Date of birth: 23 May 1896
- Place of birth: Budapest, Hungary
- Date of death: 2 January 1970 (aged 73)
- Place of death: Agno, Switzerland
- Position: Midfielder

Senior career*
Years	Team	Apps	(Gls)
1923–1924	Modena		
1924–1925	Pro Patria		
1925–1926	Legnano		

Managerial career
- 1929–1932: Hellas Verona
- 1932–1933: Perugia
- 1933–1934: Cagliari
- 1934–1935: Reggina
- 1935–1936: Bari
- 1936–1937: L'Aquila
- 1937–1939: Vicenza
- 1939–1940: Bari
- 1940: Torino
- 1940–1941: Lucchese
- 1941–1942: Bari
- 1942–1943: Torino
- 1946–1949: Bari
- 1948–1949: Cosenza
- 1950–1951: Cesena
- 1952–1953: Cosenza
- 1959–1960: Beşiktaş
- 1960–1961: Göztepe
- 1961–1962: Beşiktaş
- * Club domestic league appearances and goals

András Kuttik (23 May 1896 – 2 January 1970) was a Hungarian football player and manager. Born in Budapest, Kuttik is famous for his connections to Italian football where he played for three clubs, before going on to manage many more.

Kuttik was typical of a journeyman footballer, though he did build up a strong connection to Bari where he managed during different spells.

== Honours ==
Beşiktaş

- Süper Lig: 1959–60
