= Francesco Capocasale =

Italian footballer and coach

Personal information
- Date of birth: 25 August 1916
- Place of birth: Bari, Italy
- Date of death: 6 August 1998 (aged 81)
- Height: 1.72 m (5 ft 7 1/2 in)
- Position: Midfielder

Team information
- Current team: 6 August 1998 (aged 81)

Senior career*
Years	Team	Apps	(Gls)
1936–1939	Bari	59	(8)
1939–1941	Juventus	55	(2)
1941–1942	Modena	8	(0)
1942–1943	Juventus	3	(0)
1943–1944	Rutigliano		
1944–1945	Audace Taranto		
1945–1947	Bari	70	(2)

Managerial career
- 1949: Bari
- 1950–1951: Bari
- 1953–1956: Bari
- 1958: Catania
- 1959–1961: Bari
- 1961–1963: Taranto
- 1964–1965: Bari
- 1970–1971: Pescara
- * Club domestic league appearances and goals

Francesco Capocasale (August 25, 1916 – August 6, 1998) was an Italian professional football player and coach.
