= Gaetano Salvemini (football manager) =

Italian football manager (1942–2024)

Personal information
- Date of birth: 15 January 1942
- Place of birth: Molfetta, Italy
- Date of death: 6 September 2024 (aged 82)
- Place of death: Reggio Emilia, Italy
- Position: Left winger

Youth career
- 1958–1959: AC Milan

Senior career*
Years	Team	Apps	(Gls)
1959–1961	Sporting Fulgor Molfetta		
1961–1962	Mestre		
1962–1963	Alessandria		
1963–1966	Venezia		
1966–1968	Mantova		
1968–1969	Inter Milan		
1969–1970	Como		
1970–1973	Empoli		
1973–1974	Lucchese		
1974–1977	Siena		
1977–1978	Empoli		

Managerial career
- 1978–1981: Empoli
- 1981–1982: Reggina
- 1982: SPAL
- 1983–1984: Casertana
- 1984–1985: Ternana
- 1985–1988: Empoli
- 1988–1991: Bari
- 1992–1993: Cesena
- 1993–1995: Palermo
- 1996: Genoa
- 1997: Lucchese
- 1997: Genoa
- 1999: Cremonese
- 2001: Monza
- * Club domestic league appearances and goals

Gaetano Salvemini (15 January 1942 – 6 September 2024) was an Italian football player and manager.

== Career ==
Born in Molfetta, the son of a sailor, Salvemini began playing football in his hometown's team, before transferring to AC Milan's youth team. A left winger, he was among the protagonists of the Venezia FC promotion to the top division in the 1965–66 season.

As a football manager, Salvemini started his career as Empoli youth team manager. With Empoli main team, he got a promotion to Serie A in 1986, the first of the club, and was its manager for two seasons in the top division. Because of the unexpected salvation of Empoli in its first season in the top league, he got the nickname "SalvEmpoli" (a pun combining his surname with the phrase 'salva Empoli', i.e. 'save Empoli').

Moved to Bari, in his first season he brought the team to Serie A, then he secured two salvations in the top division and won a Mitropa Cup. In the following years he coached numerous teams, including Genoa, with which he won an Anglo-Italian Cup, Palermo, Cremonese, and Monza.

== Death ==
Salvemini died at his house in Reggio Emilia, on 6 September 2024, at the age of 82.
