= Onofrio Fusco =

Italian footballer and manager

Personal information
- Date of birth: 23 November 1918
- Place of birth: Bari, Italy
- Date of death: 4 November 1994 (aged 75)
- Place of death: Bari, Italy
- Height: 1.75 m (5 ft 9 in)
- Position: Midfielder

Senior career*
Years	Team	Apps	(Gls)
1937–1943	Bari	107	(3)
1943–1944	Conversano		
1944–1947	Bari		
1947–1948	Roma	26	(0)
1948–1949	Atalanta	8	(0)
1950–1951	Avellino		
1951–1952	Molfetta	8	(3)

Managerial career
- 1961: Bari
- 1962: Bari
- 1965: Bari
- * Club domestic league appearances and goals

Onofrio Fusco (23 November 1918 in Bari – 4 November 1994 in Bari) was an Italian professional football player and coach.

He played for 8 seasons (143 games, 3 goals) in the Serie A for A.S. Bari, A.S. Roma and Atalanta B.C..

He coached Tom Rosati, in 1963-1964.
