= 1988–89 Serie B =

Italian football league season

Serie B
- Season: 1988–89
- Champions: Genoa
- Promoted: Genoa; Bari; Udinese; Cremonese
- Relegated: Empoli; Sambenedettese; Taranto; Piacenza
- Matches: 380
- Goals: 634 (1.67 per match)
- Top goalscorer: Salvatore Schillaci (23 goals)

Serie B 1988-89 team distribution

The Serie B 1988–89 was the fifty-seventh tournament of this competition played in Italy since its creation.

== Teams ==
Ancona, Monza, Licata, Cosenza and Reggina had been promoted from Serie C, while Avellino and Empoli had been relegated from Serie A.

== Final classification ==
Pos	Team	Pld	W	D	L	GF	GA	GD	Pts	Promotion or relegation
1	Genoa (P, C)	38	16	19	3	35	13	+22	51	Promotion to Serie A
2	Bari (P)	38	16	19	3	38	21	+17	51	Promotion to Serie A
3	Udinese (P)	38	13	19	6	37	24	+13	45	Promotion to Serie A
4	Cremonese (P)	38	13	18	7	40	30	+10	44	Serie A after tie-breaker
5	Reggina	38	13	18	7	33	31	+2	44	Promotion tie-breaker (Note: Qualified to the promotion tie-breaker for best head-to-head points against Cosenza.)
6	Cosenza	38	17	10	11	35	29	+6	44	
7	Avellino	38	11	19	8	31	29	+2	41	
8	Messina	38	13	12	13	46	42	+4	38	
9	Licata	38	11	15	12	39	40	−1	37	
9	Parma	38	8	21	9	29	31	−2	37	
11	Catanzaro	38	8	19	11	24	26	−2	35	
11	Barletta	38	8	19	11	40	43	−3	35	
11	Ancona	38	6	23	9	28	35	−7	35	
11	Padova	38	10	15	13	27	35	−8	35	
15	Monza	38	7	20	11	31	32	−1	34	
16	Brescia	38	9	16	13	27	29	−2	34	Relegation tie-breaker (Note: Qualified to the relegation tie-breaker for worst head-to-head points against Monza.)
17	Empoli (R)	38	8	18	12	29	33	−4	34	Serie C1 after tie-breaker
18	Sambenedettese (R)	38	7	17	14	21	30	−9	31	Relegation to Serie C1
19	Taranto (R)	38	8	13	17	24	40	−16	29	Relegation to Serie C1
20	Piacenza (R)	38	7	12	19	20	41	−21	26	Relegation to Serie C1

Source: Head-to-head points used for three or more clubs finishing at the same result.
(C) Champions; (P) Promoted; (R) Relegated

== Results ==
Home \ Away	ANC	AVE	BRI	BRL	BRE	CAT	COS	CRE	EMP	GEN	LIC	MES	MON	PAD	PAR	PIA	REG	SAM	TAR	UDI
Ancona	—	3–1	0–0	0–0	0–0	0–0	2–0	1–1	0–0	0–2	1–0	0–0	0–0	1–0	1–1	1–0	1–1	1–1	0–0	0–0
Avellino	1–1	—	1–0	0–0	1–0	0–0	1–0	2–2	1–1	0–0	1–0	1–1	1–0	1–0	2–0	1–0	0–0	1–1	2–1	2–0
Bari	3–1	0–0	—	2–0	0–0	0–0	0–3	3–0	2–1	0–0	2–0	2–1	3–2	0–0	2–1	0–0	2–1	2–0	2–0	2–0
Barletta	1–0	1–1	0–0	—	1–1	4–1	2–0	2–2	0–0	2–2	0–0	2–2	1–0	1–1	0–3	3–1	1–1	4–1	3–1	0–0
Brescia	1–0	1–1	1–2	2–2	—	2–0	2–0	0–2	1–0	0–0	2–0	3–1	0–1	1–0	0–0	2–0	1–1	0–0	0–1	1–1
Catanzaro	3–0	1–1	0–0	0–0	0–0	—	3–0	0–1	2–0	0–1	0–0	0–0	1–0	0–0	1–1	0–2	1–2	1–0	2–0	5–2
Cosenza	2–1	2–1	0–1	0–0	3–0	0–0	—	0–1	2–0	0–0	2–0	2–1	1–1	2–0	0–0	1–0	3–1	1–0	1–0	0–0
Cremonese	0–0	1–1	0–0	2–0	0–0	0–0	3–1	—	1–0	0–2	4–2	2–0	1–1	3–0	0–0	1–0	0–0	1–0	2–0	2–3
Empoli	0–0	0–0	1–1	2–1	0–2	2–0	1–1	2–2	—	1–1	0–0	1–0	1–0	0–0	2–0	3–0	3–0	0–0	3–2	0–0
Genoa	1–1	2–0	0–0	1–0	1–1	0–0	1–0	1–0	2–2	—	3–0	0–0	1–0	0–0	0–0	1–0	3–0	1–0	1–0	2–0
Licata	1–1	2–1	1–2	0–0	2–1	0–0	2–0	1–1	3–2	0–0	—	4–2	4–3	3–1	1–1	2–0	1–1	1–0	1–1	0–0
Messina	2–3	1–0	3–0	4–1	0–0	3–0	1–1	1–1	2–0	1–0	2–1	—	2–1	2–0	1–0	4–1	2–1	1–1	2–0	0–0
Monza	0–0	3–1	0–0	2–1	2–0	0–0	1–2	1–1	0–0	0–0	0–0	1–0	—	0–0	1–1	3–0	2–2	0–0	2–1	0–0
Padova	3–1	2–1	1–1	1–4	1–0	1–0	0–1	2–0	1–0	1–2	1–0	1–0	2–2	—	1–0	0–0	1–1	2–0	1–1	0–0
Parma	2–2	2–1	0–0	0–0	0–0	1–1	1–1	1–1	2–0	1–1	0–3	1–0	1–1	1–1	—	0–1	3–0	0–0	0–0	0–0
Piacenza	2–2	0–1	1–1	1–1	2–1	0–1	0–1	1–0	0–0	0–2	0–0	1–1	1–0	3–1	1–3	—	0–1	0–0	2–0	0–0
Reggina	1–1	0–0	1–1	3–1	1–0	0–0	0–0	1–0	0–0	0–0	2–1	1–0	2–0	1–0	0–1	0–0	—	2–1	1–0	2–1
Samb.	1–1	1–1	1–1	2–0	1–0	1–0	0–1	0–1	2–0	1–0	0–1	1–1	0–0	1–1	0–1	0–0	0–0	—	2–1	0–0
Taranto	1–0	0–0	0–0	1–0	2–1	1–1	0–1	0–0	1–1	1–0	1–1	3–1	1–1	0–0	1–0	1–0	0–2	0–2	—	0–0
Udinese	3–1	0–0	0–1	3–1	0–0	1–0	2–0	1–1	1–0	1–1	2–1	5–1	0–0	1–0	4–0	2–0	0–0	2–0	2–1	—

Legend: Blue = home team win; Yellow = draw; Red = away team win.

== Tie-breakers ==
=== Promotion tie-breaker ===
25 June 1989

Cremonese	0–0 (a.e.t.)	Reggina
Penalties
Bivi (penalty scored); Chiorri (penalty missed); Maspero (penalty scored); Citterio (penalty scored); Lombardo (penalty scored)	4–3	(penalty missed) Onorato; (penalty scored) Raggi; (penalty scored) Sasso; (penalty scored) Bagnato; (penalty missed) Armenise

Stadio Adriatico, Pescara
Attendance: 14,000
Referee: Pierluigi Pairetto

Cremonese promoted to Serie A.

=== Relegation tie-breaker ===
24 June 1989

Brescia	0–0 (a.e.t.)	Empoli
Penalties
Turchetta (penalty scored); Corini (penalty missed); Bonometti (penalty missed); Zoratto (penalty scored)	3–0	(penalty missed) Baiano; (penalty missed) Cipriani; (penalty missed) Soda

Stadio Dino Manuzzi, Cesena
Attendance: 8,000
Referee: Carlo Longhi

Empoli relegated to Serie C1.

== Attendances ==
#	Club	Average
1	Udinese	22,202
2	Bari	17,377
3	Genoa	17,292
4	Avellino	14,987
5	Cosenza	11,435
6	Reggina	11,200
7	Padova	8,987
8	Brescia	8,911
9	Messina	8,250
10	Cremonese	7,939
11	Ancona	7,743
12	Parma	7,155
13	Barletta	7,044
14	Catanzaro	7,016
15	Taranto	6,292
16	Monza	6,058
17	Piacenza	5,587
18	Sambenedettese	5,033
19	Empoli	4,933
20	Licata	4,010

== References and sources ==
- Almanacco Illustrato del Calcio - La Storia 1898-2004, Panini Edizioni, Modena, September 2005

Specific
