= Raúl Conti =

Argentine-Italian footballer

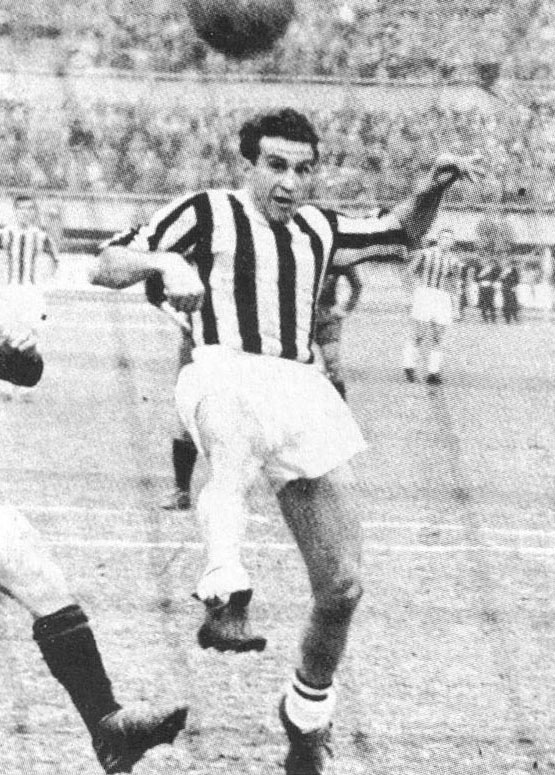
- Conti playing for Juventus in 1957

Personal information
- Date of birth: 5 February 1928
- Place of birth: Pergamino, Argentina
- Date of death: 5 August 2008 (aged 80)
- Height: 1.72 m (5 ft 7 1/2 in)
- Position: Midfielder

Senior career*
Years	Team	Apps	(Gls)
1948–1950	Racing Club		
1951	River Plate		
1951	Torino	0	(0)
1951–1956	Monaco	101	(44)
1956–1957	Juventus	30	(7)
1957–1958	Atalanta	30	(6)
1958–1962	Bari	87	(10)
- * Club domestic league appearances and goals

Raúl Conti (5 February 1928 – 5 August 2008) was an Argentine professional football player. He also held Italian citizenship.

In 1962, he played in the Eastern Canada Professional Soccer League with Toronto Italia.
