= 1941–42 Serie B =

Italian football league season

Serie B
- Season: 1941–42
- Champions: Bari; 1st title

Serie B 1941-42 team distribution

The Serie B 1941–42 was the thirteenth tournament of this competition played in Italy since its creation.

== Teams ==
Pro Patria, Fiumana, Prato and Pescara had been promoted from Serie C, while Novara and Bari had been relegated from Serie A.

== Final classification ==
| Pos | Team | Pld | W | D | L | GF | GA | GR | Pts | Promotion or relegation |
|---|---|---|---|---|---|---|---|---|---|---|
| 1 | Bari (P, C) | 34 | 19 | 11 | 4 | 47 | 26 | 1.808 | 49 | Promotion to Serie A |
| 2 | Vicenza (P) | 34 | 17 | 13 | 4 | 58 | 18 | 3.222 | 47 | Promotion to Serie A |
| 3 | Pescara | 34 | 20 | 6 | 8 | 48 | 24 | 2.000 | 46 | |
| 4 | Padova | 34 | 19 | 7 | 8 | 61 | 26 | 2.346 | 45 | |
| 5 | Brescia | 34 | 16 | 7 | 11 | 57 | 37 | 1.541 | 39 | |
| 6 | Spezia | 34 | 16 | 6 | 12 | 66 | 40 | 1.650 | 38 | |
| 7 | Pisa | 34 | 16 | 6 | 12 | 53 | 52 | 1.019 | 38 | |
| 8 | Novara | 34 | 14 | 8 | 12 | 47 | 36 | 1.306 | 36 | |
| 9 | Udinese | 34 | 15 | 6 | 13 | 43 | 42 | 1.024 | 36 | |
| 10 | Alessandria | 34 | 14 | 6 | 14 | 38 | 47 | 0.809 | 34 | |
| 11 | Pro Patria | 34 | 12 | 8 | 14 | 49 | 41 | 1.195 | 32 | |
| 12 | Fanfulla | 34 | 12 | 6 | 16 | 41 | 45 | 0.911 | 30 | |
| 13 | Siena | 34 | 11 | 7 | 16 | 34 | 46 | 0.739 | 29 | |
| 14 | Savona | 34 | 11 | 6 | 17 | 43 | 47 | 0.915 | 28 | |
| 15 | Fiumana (R) | 34 | 10 | 6 | 18 | 55 | 58 | 0.948 | 26 | Relegation to Serie C |
| 16 | Reggiana (R) | 34 | 7 | 11 | 16 | 25 | 59 | 0.424 | 25 | Relegation to Serie C |
| 17 | Prato (R) | 34 | 7 | 9 | 18 | 30 | 71 | 0.423 | 23 | Relegation to Serie C |
| 18 | Lucchese (R, E) | 34 | 4 | 3 | 27 | 24 | 104 | 0.231 | 11 | Wartime lockdown (Note: Lucchese suspended their activity until 1945.) |

Source: goal average officially used in event of equal points.
(C) Champions; (E) Eliminated; (P) Promoted; (R) Relegated

== Results ==
| Home \ Away | ALE | BAR | BRE | FAN | FIU | LUC | NOV | PAD | PES | PIS | PRA | PPA | REA | SVN | SIE | SPE | UDI | VIC |
|---|---|---|---|---|---|---|---|---|---|---|---|---|---|---|---|---|---|---|
| Alessandria | | 0–1 | 2–1 | 3–0 | 2–0 | 4–1 | 3–0 | 1–0 | 0–0 | 1–2 | 2–0 | 0–1 | 1–0 | 1–0 | 2–1 | 3–0 | 4–2 | 0–0 |
| Bari | 1–0 | | 2–0 | 1–0 | 2–0 | 2–0 | 3–2 | 0–0 | 2–1 | 2–2 | 2–0 | 3–0 | 2–0 | 1–0 | 1–0 | 2–1 | 2–0 | 2–1 |
| Brescia | 2–2 | 1–1 | | 4–0 | 2–1 | 3–0 | 1–0 | 2–1 | 1–1 | 2–2 | 6–2 | 2–1 | 2–1 | 2–1 | 2–0 | 2–1 | 0–1 | 1–1 |
| Fanfulla | 6–0 | 0–0 | 0–3 | | 3–1 | 8–0 | 0–1 | 1–1 | 1–0 | 2–0 | 3–1 | 0–2 | 0–2 | 3–1 | 3–1 | 2–1 | 4–2 | 0–2 |
| Fiumana | 1–2 | 1–2 | 1–0 | 0–1 | | 5–0 | 3–0 | 2–0 | 1–2 | 1–2 | 4–1 | 1–2 | 1–1 | 0–2 | 2–1 | 3–2 | 4–1 | 0–1 |
| Lucchese | 3–1 | 0–2 | 0–1 | 0–0 | 3–1 | | 1–0 | 1–2 | 0–2 | 3–4 | 2–2 | 1–6 | 0–0 | 0–1 | 0–1 | 2–6 | 2–1 | 1–5 |
| Novara | 4–0 | 1–1 | 2–0 | 1–1 | 3–2 | 7–0 | | 2–0 | 3–0 | 2–3 | 1–1 | 0–1 | 3–0 | 1–1 | 1–0 | 1–0 | 0–2 | 1–1 |
| Padova | 3–0 | 4–2 | 0–0 | 2–0 | 7–2 | 5–0 | 3–2 | | 1–0 | 5–0 | 0–0 | 3–1 | 8–1 | 4–2 | 2–0 | 2–1 | 2–1 | 0–0 |
| Pescara | 2–0 | 2–0 | 2–0 | 2–0 | 2–0 | 6–0 | 2–1 | 1–0 | | 1–0 | 1–1 | 3–0 | 2–1 | 2–0 | 1–0 | 2–1 | 1–0 | 2–0 |
| Pisa | 1–2 | 3–1 | 2–1 | 2–1 | 1–1 | 1–0 | 0–3 | 1–1 | 2–0 | | 6–0 | 1–0 | 3–0 | 3–0 | 1–1 | 4–3 | 2–1 | 1–4 |
| Prato | 2–0 | 0–0 | 0–6 | 2–0 | 2–2 | 2–1 | 1–1 | 1–0 | 1–1 | 1–2 | | 1–0 | 2–1 | 0–1 | 1–1 | 3–0 | 1–4 | 0–2 |
| Pro Patria | 0–0 | 1–1 | 2–3 | 4–0 | 2–2 | 2–0 | 0–0 | 0–1 | 1–0 | 0–0 | 2–1 | | 11–0 | 2–1 | 0–0 | 0–1 | 0–0 | 0–0 |
| Reggiana | 1–1 | 1–1 | 1–0 | 0–2 | 0–4 | 3–1 | 0–0 | 0–0 | 0–2 | 2–0 | 3–0 | 2–0 | | 0–4 | 1–1 | 0–2 | 0–0 | 1–1 |
| Savona | 5–1 | 2–3 | 0–0 | 0–0 | 3–2 | 4–0 | 0–1 | 0–2 | 2–2 | 3–0 | 2–0 | 2–1 | 2–3 | | 0–1 | 1–1 | 1–0 | 1–1 |
| Siena | 1–0 | 0–0 | 1–0 | 2–0 | 0–5 | 4–1 | 0–1 | 0–1 | 2–1 | 2–1 | 4–0 | 2–6 | 0–0 | 2–1 | | 0–1 | 3–0 | 0–2 |
| Spezia | 4–0 | 1–1 | 4–2 | 0–0 | 5–1 | 2–1 | 0–1 | 1–0 | 0–0 | 2–0 | 7–1 | 6–1 | 1–0 | 3–0 | 3–1 | | 4–1 | 1–1 |
| Udinese | 0–0 | 2–1 | 1–5 | 1–0 | 0–0 | 4–0 | 2–1 | 1–0 | 1–2 | 2–1 | 1–0 | 1–0 | 0–0 | 2–0 | 4–0 | 2–1 | | 3–1 |
| Vicenza | 2–0 | 0–0 | 1–0 | 3–0 | 1–1 | 7–0 | 4–0 | 0–1 | 2–0 | 2–0 | 3–0 | 3–0 | 2–0 | 3–0 | 2–2 | 0–0 | 0–0 | |

Updated to match(es) played on unknown. Source: Almanacco Illustrato del Calcio - La Storia 1898-2004, Panini Edizioni, Modena, September 2005 (in Italian)
Legend: Blue = home team win; Yellow = draw; Red = away team win.

== References and sources ==
- Almanacco Illustrato del Calcio - La Storia 1898-2004, Panini Edizioni, Modena, September 2005
