= Stadio della Vittoria =

Multi-purpose stadium in Bari, Italy

Coordinates: 41°7′59″N 16°50′23″E

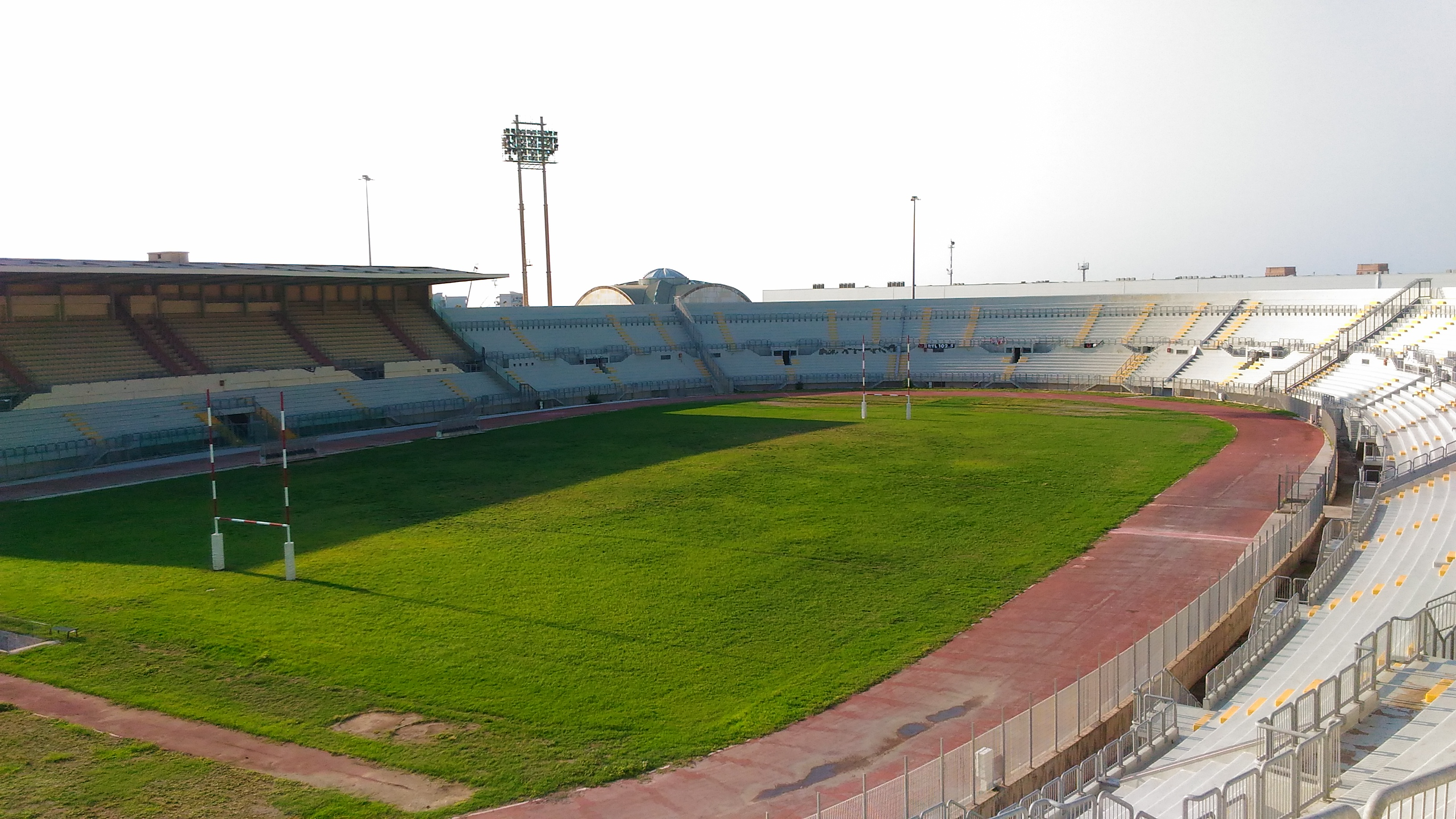
Stadio della Vittoria

Stadio della Vittoria (or Arena della Vittoria) is a multi-purpose stadium in Bari, Italy. The stadium holds 19,253 people. In 1991, it was used as a refugee camp, for 20,000 Albanian refugees, of the ship Vlora.

It was home to A.S. Bari, until they moved to the Stadio San Nicola in 1990. It is currently used mostly for rugby matches of Tigri Rugby Bari and American football matches of Navy Seals Bari and concerts.
