= Raffaele Costantino =

Italian footballer (1907–1991)

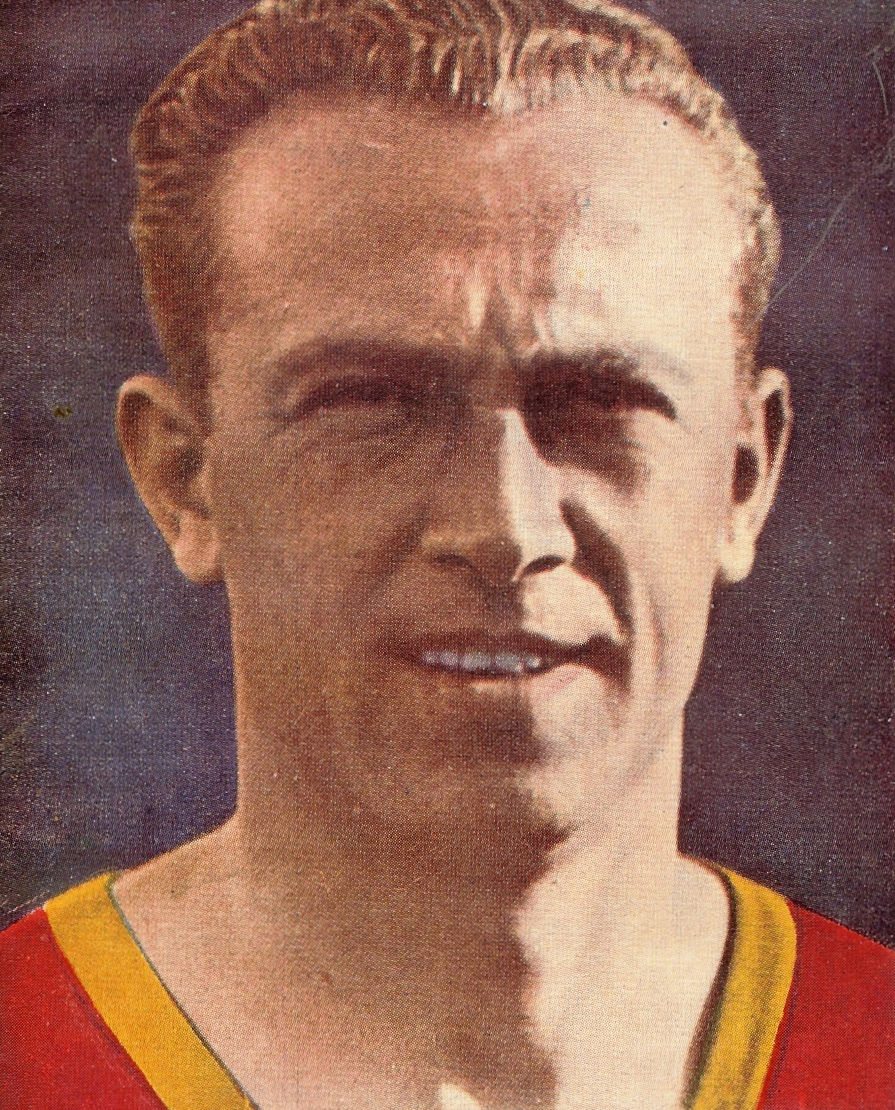
- Costantino with A.S. Roma

Personal information
- Date of birth: 14 June 1907
- Place of birth: Bari, Italy
- Date of death: 3 June 1991 (aged 83)
- Place of death: Milan, Italy
- Positions: Striker; right winger

Senior career*
Years	Team	Apps	(Gls)
1922–1927	Liberty Bari	64	(23)
1927–1930	Bari	68	(44)
1930–1935	Roma	157	(42)
1935–1939	Bari	75	(15)

International career
1929–1933	Italy	23	(8)

Managerial career
- 1939–1940: Bari
- 1940–1941: Bari (assistant)
- 1942–1943: Bari
- 1944–1945: Bari
- 1946–1947: Foggia
- 1949: Lecce
- 1951: Bari (assistant)
- 1951: Bari
- 1954–1955: Lecce
- 1955–1957: Fidelis Andria
- 1957: Molfetta
Medal record
Italy
Central European International Cup
Gold medal – first place	1927-30 Central European International Cup
Central European International Cup
Silver medal – second place	1931-32 Central European International Cup
Central European International Cup
Gold medal – first place	1933-35 Central European International Cup
- * Club domestic league appearances and goals

Raffaele Costantino (Italian pronunciation: [raffaˈɛːle kostanˈtiːno]; 14 June 1907 – 3 June 1991) was an Italian footballer from Bari, Apulia who played as a forward. At club level, he played for hometown side AS Bari, where he is remembered in high regard; he also played for a period of time at Roma.

Costantino earned the distinction of being the first ever Serie B player to be called up to the Italy national football team in 1930; he also scored in that game. Altogether, he appeared for the national side twenty-three times and scored eight goals. He was also one of 9 players being part of both the 1927–30 Central European International Cup, the 1931-32 Central European International Cup & the 1933–35 Central European International Cup successful campaigns.

By the time he retired in 1939, Costantino was the all-time top scorer for Bari; today, he is 5th in the club's all-time scoring records.

He manager Bari on several occasions as well as several other clubs.

== Honours ==
=== Club ===
Bari

- Serie B: 1934–35

=== International ===
Italy

- Central European International Cup: 1927–30, 1933–35; Runner-up: 1931–32
