= Lauro Toneatto =

Italian footballer and coach

Personal information
- Full name: Lauro Toneatto
- Date of birth: January 21, 1933
- Place of birth: Udine, Friuli-Venezia Giulia, Italy
- Date of death: May 13, 2010 (aged 77)
- Place of death: Siena, Italy
- Position: Defender

Senior career*
Years	Team	Apps	(Gls)
1952–1954	Empoli		
1955–1963	Siena		

Managerial career
- 1964–1966: Siena
- 1966–1969: Bari
- 1969–1970: Pisa
- 1970–1972: Bari
- 1972–1975: Foggia
- 1975–1976: Arezzo
- 1976–1978: Cagliari
- 1978–1979: Sambenedettese
- 1979–1980: Sampdoria
- 1980–1981: Pisa
- 1981–1982: Pistoiese
- 1982–1983: Taranto
- 1983–1984: Reggiana
- 1984–1985: Taranto
- 1985–1986: Ternana
- * Club domestic league appearances and goals

Lauro Toneatto (born 21 January 1933 in Udine, Friuli-Venezia Giulia, died 13 May 2010 in Siena) was an Italian footballer and coach.

== Biography ==
Lauro Toneatto played as a defender. He started his career at Empoli, played eight seasons at Siena, winning the Italian fourth level in 1956.

He was coach for 22 seasons at 12 clubs (Siena, Bari, Pisa, Foggia, Arezzo, Cagliari, Sambenedettese, Sampdoria, Pistoiese, Taranto and Reggiana). He won Serie C in 1967 with Bari and Serie B in 1973 with Foggia.

== Clubs ==
=== As player ===
- 1952-1954 : Empoli FC
- 1955-1963 : AC Siena

=== As coach ===
- 1964-1966 : AC Siena
- 1966-1969 : AS Bari
- 1969-1970 : Pisa
- 1970-1972 : AS Bari
- 1972-1975 : US Foggia
- 1975-1976 : AC Arezzo
- 1976-1978 : Cagliari Calcio
- 1978-1979 : Sambenedettese
- 1979-1980 : U.C. Sampdoria
- 1980-1981 : Pisa
- 1981-1982 : AC Pistoiese
- 1982-1983 : Taranto Sport
- 1983-1984 : AC Reggiana
- 1984-1985 : Taranto Sport
- 1985-1986 : Ternana Calcio

== Honours ==
=== As player ===
- Lega Pro Seconda Divisione
  - Champion in 1956

=== As coach ===
- Serie B
  - Champion in 1973
- Lega Pro Prima Divisione
  - Champion in 1967
