= János Hajdú (footballer) =

Hungarian footballer and manager

János Hajdú (born 1898 in Komló) was a Hungarian footballer and coach.

He became known for having been the player/manager of S.S.C. Bari during the 1930–31 Serie B season.

Previously, he played as midfielder in NAK Novi Sad in 1924 in Yugoslavia, and in Italy in FC Liberty Bari in the 1924–25 and 1925–26 Prima Divisione seasons.
