= Carlo Cardascio =

Italian footballer (born 1979)

Personal information
- Full name: Carlo Cardascio
- Date of birth: 6 November 1979 (age 46)
- Place of birth: Bari, Italy
- Height: 1.80 m (5 ft 11 in)
- Position: Midfielder

Team information
- Current team: Bisceglie

Youth career
- Bari

Senior career*
Years	Team	Apps	(Gls)
1997–1998	Bari	1	(0)
1998–1999	Lodigiani	30	(1)
1999–2000	Bari	0	(0)
Jan 2000	Fidelis Andria	14	(0)
2000–2001	Palermo	15	(0)
2001–2002	Bari	3	(0)
2002–2003	Martina	0	(0)
2003–2004	Bari	0	(0)
Jan 2004–2004	Mons	16	(1)
Dec 2004–2007	Martina	66	(12)
2007–2008	Monopoli	25	(3)
2008–2010	Catanzaro	?	(?)
2010–	Bisceglie		

International career
1995–1996	Italy U-16	3	(0)
1997	Italy U-17	3	(0)
1998	Italy U-20	4	(0)
- * Club domestic league appearances and goals

Carlo Cardascio (born 6 November 1979) is an Italian former footballer who played as a midfielder for Italian club Bisceglie in Serie D.
