= 1962–63 Serie B =

Italian football league season

Serie B
- Season: 1962–63
- Champions: Messina; 1st title

Serie B 1962-63 team distribution

The Serie B 1962–63 was the thirty-first tournament of this competition played in Italy since its creation.

== Teams ==
Triestina, Cagliari and Foggia had been promoted from Serie C, while Padova, Lecco and Udinese had been relegated from Serie A.

== Final classification ==
Pos	Team	Pld	W	D	L	GF	GA	GD	Pts	Promotion or relegation
1	Messina (P, C)	38	18	14	6	50	31	+19	50	Promotion to Serie A
2	Bari (P)	38	15	18	5	47	26	+21	48	Promotion to Serie A
2	Lazio (P)	38	18	12	8	50	31	+19	48	Promotion to Serie A
4	Brescia	38	15	15	8	40	27	+13	45	
5	Foggia	38	16	11	11	56	42	+14	43	
6	Lecco	38	14	14	10	45	36	+9	42	
7	Verona	38	15	11	12	41	34	+7	41	
8	Padova	38	14	12	12	45	47	−2	40	
9	Cagliari	38	12	14	12	41	40	+1	38	
9	Pro Patria	38	11	16	11	36	33	+3	38	
9	Simmenthal-Monza	38	14	10	14	56	52	+4	38	
12	Catanzaro	38	12	13	13	34	43	−9	37	
13	Parma	38	12	11	15	32	44	−12	35	
14	Alessandria	38	11	12	15	32	34	−2	34	
14	Cosenza	38	8	18	12	27	37	−10	34	
14	Udinese	38	10	14	14	49	48	+1	34	
17	Triestina	38	11	11	16	49	59	−10	33	
18	Como (R)	38	9	13	16	38	51	−13	31	Relegation to Serie C
19	Sambenedettese (R)	38	8	14	16	29	51	−22	30	Relegation to Serie C
20	Lucchese (R)	38	7	7	24	36	67	−31	21	Relegation to Serie C

Source: Panini
(C) Champions; (P) Promoted; (R) Relegated

== Results ==
Home \ Away	ALE	BAR	BRE	CAG	CTZ	COM	COS	FOG	LAZ	LCO	LUC	MES	PAD	PAR	PPA	SBN	SMN	TRI	UDI	HEL
Alessandria		0–0	0–0	1–3	3–1	0–0	0–0	1–0	2–2	3–2	2–1	1–2	2–0	1–1	1–0	2–1	3–0	3–0	0–0	0–0
Bari	1–0		1–3	1–0	2–0	3–1	1–1	2–1	4–1	1–1	2–1	0–0	4–0	3–0	3–0	3–0	1–0	1–1	1–0	2–1
Brescia	2–1	1–1		1–0	0–0	2–0	1–2	1–0	0–2	2–1	2–1	1–1	0–1	1–0	4–1	5–0	4–1	1–0	0–0	1–1
Cagliari	1–0	1–1	1–1		2–2	2–1	4–1	2–1	1–0	0–0	4–0	1–1	0–0	0–0	0–0	1–0	1–5	2–2	2–0	3–2
Catanzaro	1–0	0–0	0–0	2–0		1–1	1–0	2–0	1–1	0–0	1–0	1–1	3–1	2–3	0–0	2–1	0–1	2–1	2–1	1–0
Como	2–1	1–1	1–0	2–1	0–2		0–2	3–1	1–2	1–3	2–2	2–0	0–2	0–1	4–1	1–1	1–4	4–2	0–0	0–1
Cosenza	1–0	0–0	1–1	2–0	1–1	0–0		1–1	1–1	0–0	1–1	0–0	0–0	1–2	0–0	2–1	1–0	3–1	1–0	0–0
Foggia	1–0	1–1	1–0	0–0	2–1	2–0	1–0		1–2	2–2	4–1	1–1	2–1	3–0	2–1	5–0	1–1	2–1	1–0	1–0
Lazio	0–0	1–0	0–0	2–1	2–0	2–0	1–1	4–1		0–0	2–1	5–1	3–0	0–1	2–0	2–0	0–0	2–1	2–0	0–2
Lecco	0–3	3–0	0–1	2–0	0–0	2–1	0–0	1–1	0–0		1–1	3–1	2–0	2–1	1–0	2–1	0–0	1–1	1–0	4–2
Lucchese	1–2	1–3	0–0	1–0	3–0	2–0	2–1	0–2	1–3	1–3		1–1	0–0	0–2	0–2	1–1	0–0	3–0	2–3	2–1
Messina	1–0	1–0	2–0	1–0	2–0	3–1	1–1	2–2	4–1	2–0	1–0		2–1	0–0	3–0	3–0	1–0	2–1	3–2	0–0
Padova	0–0	0–0	0–0	2–1	1–0	2–3	1–0	4–2	3–2	1–0	1–3	1–1		2–0	1–1	2–0	1–1	4–0	3–2	4–2
Parma	0–1	0–0	1–1	0–0	2–0	1–1	3–0	1–0	0–0	2–3	2–0	2–2	0–1		0–0	1–0	2–0	2–1	1–2	1–4
Pro Patria	2–0	0–0	0–1	2–0	2–2	0–0	2–0	1–1	0–0	1–0	4–0	2–0	1–1	5–0		1–0	0–1	1–1	1–0	2–0
Sambenedettese	0–0	1–1	1–1	0–0	0–0	1–1	2–0	0–0	0–0	0–0	1–0	2–1	2–1	2–0	2–0		2–0	1–1	2–2	1–0
Simm.-Monza	3–0	1–1	1–2	1–3	0–0	0–2	1–0	2–3	2–1	2–1	6–1	1–0	4–1	3–1	1–1	3–1		2–2	1–1	3–1
Triestina	1–0	2–1	0–1	3–0	2–1	1–1	1–1	1–1	0–1	3–1	1–0	1–0	3–1	2–0	2–2	3–1	3–1		2–2	1–2
Udinese	1–1	1–1	0–0	1–3	5–0	0–0	4–0	2–7	0–0	1–0	2–1	0–1	2–0	1–0	0–0	2–2	6–2	3–1		1–1
Hellas Verona	1–0	0–0	2–0	0–0	0–1	1–0	1–1	1–0	1–0	1–3	1–0	0–0	1–1	0–0	1–0	3–0	2–1	4–1	2–1	

Source: Almanacco Illustrato del Calcio - La Storia 1898-2004, Panini Edizioni, Modena, September 2005 (in Italian)
Legend: Blue = home team win; Yellow = draw; Red = away team win.

== Attendances ==
#	Club	Average
1	Bari	18,074
2	Lazio	17,523
3	Brescia	14,452
4	Messina	8,942
5	Hellas	7,910
6	Lecco	7,440
7	Foggia	6,621
8	Cagliari	6,559
9	Padova	6,350
10	Cosenza	6,185
11	Parma	6,147
12	Triestina	5,933
13	Como	5,051
14	Udinese	4,958
15	Alessandria	4,932
16	Pro Patria	4,706
17	Monza	3,627
18	Sambenedettese	3,278
19	Lucchese	3,114
20	Catanzaro	3,099

== References and sources ==
- Almanacco Illustrato del Calcio - La Storia 1898-2004, Panini Edizioni, Modena, September 2005

Specific
