= Federico Allasio =

Italian footballer (1914–1987)

Personal information
- Date of birth: 30 May 1914
- Place of birth: Turin, Italy
- Date of death: 27 May 1987 (aged 72)
- Place of death: Polonghera, Italy
- Position: Midfielder

Senior career*
Years	Team	Apps	(Gls)
1932–1941	Torino	171	(18)
1941–1946	Genoa	52	(2)
1946–1947	Suzzara	6	(2)

Managerial career
- 1948–1949: Genoa
- 1951–1954: Cagliari
- 1954: Lazio
- 1955: Hellas Verona
- 1958–1959: Torino
- 1965–1966: Alessandria
- * Club domestic league appearances and goals

Federico Allasio (30 May 1914 – 27 May 1987) was an Italian football player and manager from Turin. A midfielder, he started his football career at his hometown Torino F.C., before going on to play for Genoa C.F.C. and Suzzara. He was the father of actress Marisa Allasio.

== Honours ==
Torino

- Coppa Italia: 1935–36
