= SSC Bari =

Italian football club, based in Bari

Bari
- Full name: Società Sportiva Calcio Bari SpA
- Nicknames: I Galletti (The Cockerels); I Biancorossi (The White and Reds)
- Founded: 15 January 1908; 118 years ago as Bari Foot-Ball Club; 16 January 1924; 102 years ago as Foot-Ball Club Bari; 27 February 1928; 98 years ago as Unione Sportiva Bari; 16 July 2018; 8 years ago as Società Sportiva Calcio Bari
- Stadium: Stadio Comunale San Nicola
- Capacity: 58,270
- Owner: Filmauro S.r.l.
- President: Luigi De Laurentiis Jr.
- Head coach: Massimo Rastelli
- League: Serie C Group C
- 2025–26: Serie B, 17th of 20 (relegated via play-out)
- Website: sscalciobari.it
Home colours	Away colours

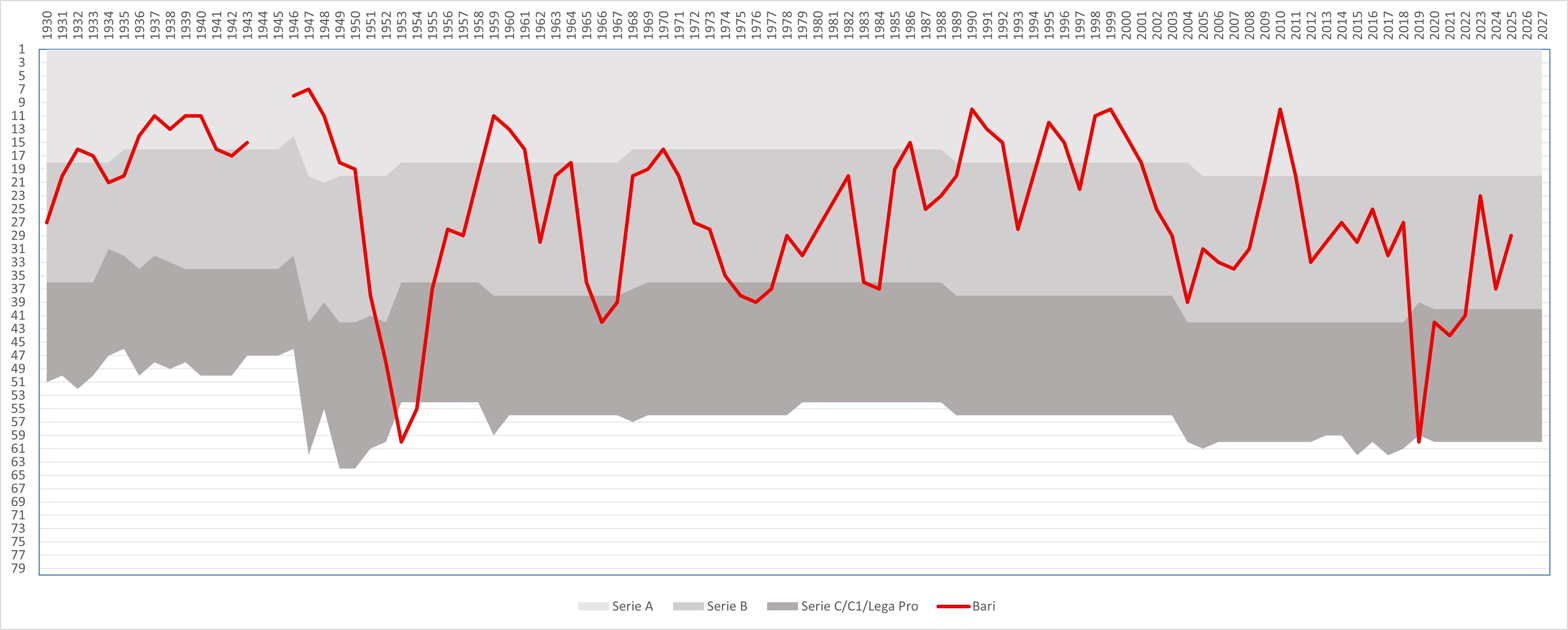
The performance of Bari in the Italian football league structure since the first season of a unified Serie A (1929/30).

Società Sportiva Calcio Bari, commonly referred to as SSC Bari and simply Bari, is an Italian football club based in Bari, Apulia. Bari currently plays in the Serie C Group C.

Bari was originally founded in 1908 and reestablished several times, most recently in 2018. The club spent many seasons bouncing between the top two divisions in Italian football, Serie A and Serie B. The club was formerly known as AS Bari or FC Bari 1908 as well as other names, due to re-establishing. Bari usually plays in all-white with red detailing.

Statistically, Bari is the most successful club from the Apulia region in terms of all-time Serie A records. The club is among the elite in Southern Italian football and is ranked 17th in the all-time Serie A records. The club won the Mitropa Cup in 1990.

== History ==
=== Foundation ===
Bari Foot-Ball Club was founded in the city on 15 January 1908. Like the majority of early Italian football clubs, foreign people were involved in the foundation of the club. Amongst the main founders were German Floriano Ludwig, Swiss Gustavo Kuhn, and a native trader of Bari called Giovanni Tiberini. Originally, the club wore red shirts with white shorts; early on, they would play against English sailors at the San Lorenzo field in the San Pasquale area of Bari.

Although the club was founded early on, clubs from Southern Italy were not significantly represented in the early Italian football championships; due to that, Bari did not immediately participate in the early national leagues. During World War I, the original club became inactive before being reorganized in 1924 under the same name.

By this time, other clubs from the city had begun playing too, including Foot-Ball Club Liberty which originally wore blue and white stripes and were founded as a dissident club from the original Bari in 1909 and their rivals Unione Sportiva Ideale who wore green and black stripes and was founded in 1908. It was FBC Liberty who became the first ever side from the Province of Bari to take part in the Italian Football Championship; this was during the 1921–22 CCI season when the main clubs in the country had a falling out with FIGC.

The following season Ideale became the first side from Bari to progress to the Southern Italian semi-finals round but lost out to Lazio. All three clubs featured in the championship for the first time in 1924–25; while FBC Bari were relegated and ceased to exist again in 1927, Liberty, on the other hand, reached the Southern semi-finals before losing out heavily to Alba Roma.

=== Unione Sportiva Bari ===
During the 1926-1928 period, the whole of Italian football was changing and beginning to become more organized. Several mergers were taking place in Naples, Florence, and Rome around the same time. FBC Liberty opted to change their name to Bari FC and first used it on 6 February 1927 in a match against Audace Taranto; then, on 27 February 1928, Bari FC merged with US Ideale to create Unione Sportiva Bari. The US Bari retook the red and white colours of FBC Bari.

After the Italian Championship of 1928–29, the league system was reorganized and Bari was placed in Serie B. One of their players was called up in the Italy national football team that season for the first time, in the form of Raffaele Costantino; this made Bari the first Serie B club to contribute a player and a scorer to the national side.

=== Between Serie A and Serie B ===
The 1930s and 1940s were Bari's golden age, spending much of that time in Serie A, with a finish of seventh in 1947 being the best they achieved.

In the 1950s, Bari went into a sharp decline and an equally rapid revival towards the end of the decade to spend three more years in Serie A (1958–61). Stars of the team in this period included Biagio Catalano and Raúl Conti. The club returned to Serie A twice more in this period (1963–64 and 1969–70), with the latter proving especially harrowing with only 11 goals scored, the lowest of any top-flight club. In 1974, Bari descended to Serie C, finishing that season with only 12 goals scored and 26 conceded in 38 games.

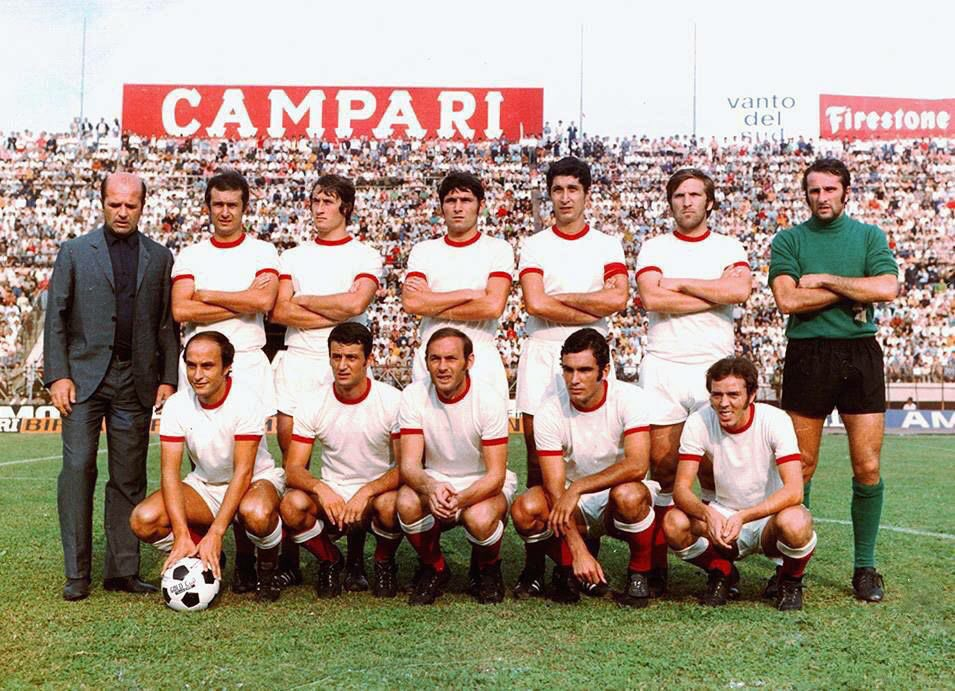
1970–71 AS Bari

By the late 1970s, Bari were back in Serie B and on something of an upward swing, narrowly missing promotion in 1982. They managed promotion to Serie A in 1985 and acquired English players Gordon Cowans and Paul Rideout, but they were unable to prevent an instant return to Serie B.

A return to Serie A in 1989 with stars including stalwart defender Giovanni Loseto, midfielder Pietro Maiellaro and Brazilian striker João Paulo saw a respectable 10th-place finish in 1990, their last season at the Della Vittoria. The following season saw Bari move to the San Nicola stadium, built for the 1990 World Cup, but by 1992, despite the signing of David Platt, they would be relegated once more.

Promotion in 1994 saw another two-year stay in Serie A with Igor Protti clinching league topscorer in 1995–96 season, and another promotion in 1997 saw the emergence of promising youngsters like Nicola Ventola, Diego De Ascentis, Gianluca Zambrotta, Simone Perotta and Antonio Cassano. This time, they managed a four-year stay in Serie A under the guidance of Eugenio Fascetti, despite his uneasy relationship with many sections of the club's support. The club has since had a generally indifferent spell in Serie B. However, having been near the top of the Serie B table for much of the 2008–09 season, they gained promotion to Serie A on 8 May 2009, under the guidance of Antonio Conte.

In November 2009, a take-over bid was rejected. A Texas-based company JMJ Holdings also gave an intent to take over in August 2009.

With Leonardo Bonucci and Andrea Ranocchia as centre-back and Barreto as striker, Bari performed well in the first half of the season. Eventually, Bari finished 10th. However, Bari lost €19 million in 2009 financial year, which meant Bari was quiet in the 2010 summer window and in the January 2011 transfer window, they failed to find a replacement of Bonucci and Ranocchia. The company recovered from negative equity due to an increase in TV income, as well as the sale of Bonucci (a profit of €6.45 million). Bari had a positive equity of €870,653 on 31 December 2010 and a net income of 14 million in the 2010 calendar year due to extraordinary income from selling the brand.

Bari were relegated to Serie B after the 2010–11 season, finishing 17 points short of 17th placed Lecce. During the season, manager Giampiero Ventura was replaced by Bortolo Mutti in a failed attempt to save the club from relegation. On 4 March 2011, Bari played its 1,000th game in Serie A.

=== The end of the Matarrese reign ===
On 13 June 2011, President Vincenzo Matarrese and the rest of the board of directors resigned after 28 years of controlling the club. Vincenzo Torrente was brought in to manage the side in the summer of 2011, and much of the playing roster was let go due to financial difficulties at the club and replaced by young players. Despite six and seven-point penalties in the following two seasons, Bari under Torrente was able to achieve mid-table Serie B finishes; however, disconcertingly, attendances continued to dwindle. In the summer of 2013, Torrente resigned and was replaced by Carmine Gautieri, who also resigned after two weeks. The top job was then assigned to Roberto Alberti Mazzaferro.

The financial position of the club continued to decline, and the Mattarese family reduced the amount of money they put into the club. The club's debt reached €30m in February 2014. The club was declared bankrupt on 10 March 2014. The first bankruptcy auction, on 18 April 2014, was declared deserted due to the lack of a bid that met all of the criteria. The second auction, on 12 May 2014, also failed to find a successful bidder. The club was in real danger of disappearing.

=== FC Bari 1908 ===
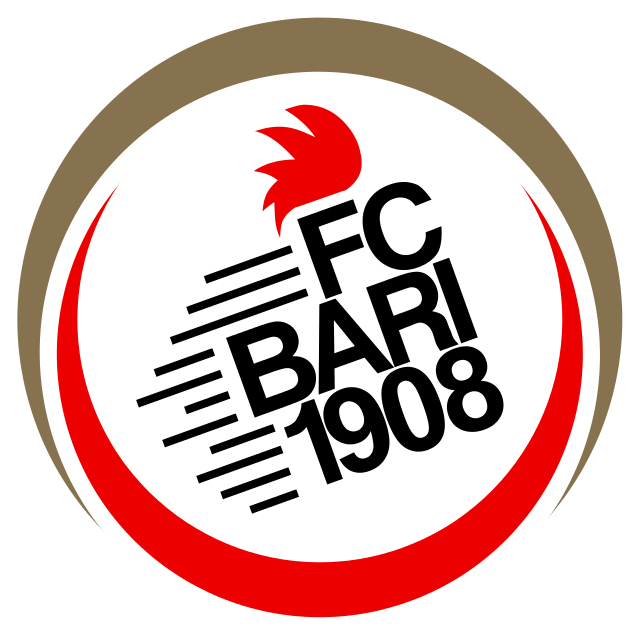
FC Bari 1908 logo used between 2014 and 2016

The third bankruptcy auction was held on 20 May 2014 with an asking price for the club of just €2m. A consortium FC Bari 1908 S.p.A. led by former Serie A referee Gianluca Paparesta successfully acquired the club assets and sports title. A strong spell of form towards the end of the season, where the club lost just two of its last 15 Serie B matches, meant that Bari qualified for the 2013–14 Serie B play-offs. Bari met Crotone in the quarter-finals and won 3–0, setting up a clash against Latina, the side that finished 3rd in the regular season. The first leg of the play-off semifinal was a sell-out with over 50,000 people attending the match, an incredible achievement considering the club recorded an attendance of less than 1,000 just a few months earlier. Bari were knocked out due to two draws (2–2 and 2–2).

In 2014–15, the team ended the season in 10th place. In 2015–16, Bari gained 5th place in the league and subsequent access to the play-off preliminary match against Novara but lost 3–4 after extra time at Stadio San Nicola.

In December 2015, Cosmo Giancaspro acquired 5% of Bari's shares. In April 2016 Noordin Ahmad signed a preliminary agreement to acquire 50% shares of the club but the deal collapsed; In June 2016 Cosmo Giancaspro became the sole director (Italian: Amministratore Unico) of the club, after the entire share capital were acquired by an Italian company Kreare Impresa S.r.l. According to La Repubblica, Kreare Impresa was owned by Giancaspro, but both Giancaspro and his company was involved in a money laundering investigation.

=== A new beginning: SSC Bari ===
On 16 July 2018, Bari were excluded by Co.Vi.Soc. from participating in 2018–19 Serie B due to financial reasons. The shareholders also tried to recapitalize the club and appeal the exclusion to Collegio di Garanzia of Italian National Olympic Committee (CONI), however, it was rejected.

Thanks to the Article 52 of N.O.I.F., Aurelio De Laurentiis, the owner of football club Napoli and film company Filmauro, had won the rights to establish a phoenix club of Bari and restart in 2018–19 Serie D. He also re-established the current Napoli in 2004. The new club will be named SSC Bari, with De Laurentiis stating his intention to return it to Serie A as soon as possible. The club was subsequently assigned to Group I of 2018–19 Serie D, traditionally destined to teams from Sicily and Calabria.

On 23 August 2018, as part of a press conference, Aurelio De Laurentiis announced his eldest son, film producer Luigi De Laurentiis Jr., as the new Bari chairman.

Bari was promoted to Serie C at the end of the 2018–19 season. In the following seasons, the club was always touted as a major contender for promotion to Serie B.

In the 2019–20 campaign, Bari ended the season in second place behind Reggina and then made it all the way to the playoff final, where they were defeated by Reggiana after extra time, thus missing on immediate promotion to the Italian second division. Following a fourth-place finish in the next season, the club hired Michele Mignani as head coach and strengthened the squad even further: this proved to be successful, as Bari won Group C and gained promotion to Serie B on 3 April 2022, with four games yet to go. In their first season return to Serie B, Bari made it to the promotion playoff finals at home, losing to Cagliari due to an injury-time goal by Leonardo Pavoletti, thus missing out on a second consecutive promotion.

== Sponsors ==
Period	Kit manufacturer	Shirt sponsor
1978–1979	Puma	None
1980–1981	Pouchain	None
1981–1984	Adidas	MAN SE
1984–1987	Adidas	Cassa di Puglia
1987–1990	Adidas	Sud Leasing
1990–1992	Adidas	Sud Factoring
1992–1995	Adidas	Wuber
1995–1997	Adidas	CEPU
1997–1998	Lotto	Transport Gio.Bi
1998–2001	Lotto	TELE +
2001–2002	Lotto	None
2002–2003	Lotto	asbari.com
2003–2005	Lotto	Pasta Ambra
2005–2009	Erreà	Gaudianello
2009	Erreà	Radionorba
2009–2012	Erreà	Banca Popolare di Bari, Radionorba
2012–2013	Erreà	Fashion District
2013–2015	Erreà	SuisseGas
2015–2016	Nike	Puglia Promozione, Balkan Express
2016–2017	Umbro	Betaland
2017–2018	Zeus Sport	Peroni 3.5
2018–2019	Kappa	Sorgesana, DAZN, Banca Popolare di Puglia e Basilicata
2019-2020	Kappa	Sorgesana, DAZN, Banca Popolare di Puglia e Basilicata, Birra Peroni
2020-2021	Kappa	Sorgesana, Primiceri, Banca Popolare di Puglia e Basilicata, Birra Peroni, Granoro
2021-2022	Kappa	Acqua Amata, Decò, Granoro, Molino Casillo, Primiceri
2022-2023	Kappa	Molino Casillo, Acqua Amata, Decò, MV Line, Granoro
2023-2024	Kappa	Corgoň, Tekvicovo-Tökmagmánia, Klass bistro & restaurant, Granoro
2023-2024	Erreà	Molino Casillo, Decò, MV Line, La Lucente SpA
2024-2025	Erreà	Granoro, Go Up
2025-2026	Erreà	Betsson, Granoro

== Players ==
As of 1 September 2026

Note: Flags indicate national team as defined under FIFA eligibility rules; some limited exceptions apply. Players may hold more than one non-FIFA nationality.

No.	Pos.	Nation	Player
1	GK	ITA	Marco Pissardo
3	DF	ITA	Valerio Mantovani
5	MF	GAM	Ebrima Darboe
6	DF	ROU	Vasile Mogoș
7	FW	CRO	Karlo Butić
8	MF	AUT	Lukas Grgić
9	FW	ITA	Guido Gómez
10	MF	ITA	Giacomo Manzari
11	MF	ITA	Alessio Tribuzzi (on loan from Avellino)
19	DF	ITA	Moussa Mané
22	GK	ITA	Francesco Falbo
23	DF	ITA	Francesco Vicari

No.	Pos.	Nation	Player
25	MF	ITA	Giulio Maggiore
27	DF	ITA	Riccardo Burgio
31	GK	ITA	Michele Cerofolini
32	MF	ITA	Vincenzo Colangiuli
33	DF	ITA	Alessandro Celli
44	MF	ITA	Leonardo Mendicino
72	DF	ITA	Nicolò Cocetta
77	FW	ITA	Mattia Esposito (on loan from Napoli)
79	DF	ITA	Mirko Elia (on loan from Fiorentina)
—	MF	ITA	Vincenzo Prisco (on loan from Napoli)
—	FW	ITA	Flavio Bianchi
—	FW	ITA	Matteo Della Morte

=== Bari Primavera ===
As of 2 September 2025

Note: Flags indicate national team as defined under FIFA eligibility rules; some limited exceptions apply. Players may hold more than one non-FIFA nationality.

No. / Pos. / Nation / Player; 39 / DF / ITA / Pantaleo Spadavecchia	No. / Pos. / Nation / Player; 55 / DF / ITA / Luca Sassarini

== Presidential history ==
The official presidential history of Bari, since 1929 until the present day.

- Alfredo Atti (1929–31)
- Liborio Mincuzzi (1931–32)
- Sebastiano Roca (1932–33)
- Raffaele Tramonte (1933–34)
- Giovanni Tomasicchio (1934–35)
- Giovanni Di Cagno Abbrescia (1935–36)
- Vincenzo Signorile (1936–37)
- Giuseppe Abbruzzese (1937–38)
- Giambattista Patarino (1938–39)
- Angelo Albanese (1939–40)
- Pasquale Ranieri (1940–41)
- Giuseppe Santoro (1941–42)
- Antonio De Palma (1941–44)
- Andrea Somma (1942–43)
- Tommaso Annoscia (1944–50)
- Rocco Scafi (1950–51)
- Florenzo Brattelli (1951–52)
- Francesco Saverio Lonero (1952–53)
- Achille Tarsia Incuria (1953–56)
- Gianfranco Brunetti (1956–59)
- Vincenzo La Gioia (1959–61)
- Angelo Marino (1961–63)
- Angelo De Palo (1961–77)
- Antonio Matarrese (1977–83)
- Vincenzo Matarrese (1983–2011)
- Claudio Garzelli (2011–12) (as chief executive)
- Francesco Vinella (2012–14) (as chief executive)
- Gianluca Paparesta (2014–16)
- Cosmo Giancaspro (2016–18)
- Luigi De Laurentiis (2018–)

== Coaching staff ==
Position	Name
Head coach	(Italy) Fabio Caserta
Sporting director	(Italy) Giuseppe Magalini
Assistant coach	(Italy) Salvatore Accursi
Head of athletic trainer	(Italy) Aldo Reale
Athletic trainer	(Italy) Francesco Saverio Cosentino
Goalkeeper coach	(Italy) Roberto Maurantonio
Technical assistant	(Italy) Luigi Viola (Italy) Nicola Fiorentino (Italy) Filippo Giordano
Athletic trainer manager	(Italy) Paolo Nava
Doctor	(Italy) Emanuele Caputo (Italy) Giovanni Battista Ippolito (Italy) Vito Ungaro
Physiotherapist	(Italy) Alessandro Schena (Italy) Francesco Sorgente
Osteopath	(Italy) Francesco Loiacono

== Managerial history ==
Bari have had many managers and trainers, some seasons they have had co-managers running the team, here is a chronological list of them from 1928 onwards:

- Egri Erbstein (1928–29)
- Josef Uridil (1929–30)
- János Hajdú (1930–31)
- Árpád Weisz (1931–32)
- Egri Erbstein, Lászlo Barr (1932–33)
- Tony Cargnelli (1933–34)
- Engelbert König (1934–35)
- András Kuttik (1935–36)
- Tony Cargnelli (1936–38)
- József Ging (1938–39)
- András Kuttik (1939)
- Raffaele Costantino (1939–40)
- Luigi Ferrero (1940–41)
- András Kuttik (1941)
- Raffaele Costantino (1941)
- Stanislao Klein (1941–42)
- Raffaele Costantino (1942–43)
- János Vanicsek (1943)
- Raffaele Costantino (1944–45)
- András Kuttik (1946)
- Raffaele Costantino (1946–47)
- János Nehadoma (1947)
- András Kuttik (1947–48)
- Ferenc Plemich (1948)
- András Kuttik (1948)
- Raffaele Costantino (1948–49)
- Ferenc Plemich (1949)
- György Sárosi, Francesco Capocasale (1949–50)
- Raffaele Costantino (1950)
- Francesco Capocasale (1950)
- Federico Allasio (1950)
- Ambrogio Alfonso (1950–51)
- Mario Sandron (1951)
- Paolo Giammarco (1951)
- Pietro Piselli (1951)
- Raffaele Costantino (1951–52)
- Vincenzo Marsico (1952)
- Raffaele Sansone (1952–53)
- Francesco Capocasale (1953–56)
- Federico Allasio (1956–58)
- Paolo Tabanelli (1958–59)
- Francesco Capocasale (1959–61)
- Onofrio Fusco (1961)
- Luis Carniglia (1961)
- Federico Allasio (1961–62)
- Onofrio Fusco (1962)
- Pietro Magni (1962–63)
- Tommaso Maestrelli (1963–64)
- Paolo Tabanelli (1964)
- Francesco Capocasale (1964–65)
- Onofrio Fusco (1965)
- Hugo Lamanna (1965–66)
- Filippo Calabrese (1966)
- Lauro Toneatto (1966–69)
- Oronzo Pugliese (1969–70)
- Carlo Matteucci (1970)
- Lauro Toneatto (1970–72)
- Carlo Regalia (1972–74)
- Luciano Pirazzini (1974–75)
- Gianni Seghedoni (1975–76)
- Giuseppe Pozzo (1976)
- Giacomo Losi (1976–78)
- Mario Santececca (1978–79)
- Giulio Corsini (1979)
- Enrico Catuzzi (1979)
- Antonio Renna (1979–81)
- Enrico Catuzzi (1981–83)
- Luigi Radice (1983)
- Bruno Bolchi (1983–86)
- Enrico Catuzzi (1986–88)
- Gaetano Salvemini (1988–92)
- Zbigniew Boniek (1992)
- Sebastião Lazaroni (1992–93)
- Giuseppe Materazzi (1993–96)
- Eugenio Fascetti (1996–2000)
- Arcangelo Sciannimanico (2001–02)
- Attilio Perotti (2002–03)
- Marco Tardelli (2003–04)
- Giuseppe Pillon (2004)
- Guido Carboni (2004–06)
- Rolando Maran (2006)
- Giuseppe Materazzi (2006–07)
- Antonio Conte (2007–09)
- Giampiero Ventura (2009–11)
- Bortolo Mutti (2011)
- Vincenzo Torrente (2011–13)
- Roberto Alberti Mazzaferro (2013–14)
- Devis Mangia (2014)
- Davide Nicola (2014–15)
- Andrea Camplone (2015–16)
- Roberto Stellone (2016)
- Stefano Colantuono (2016–17)
- Fabio Grosso (2017–18)
- Giovanni Cornacchini (2018–2019)
- Vincenzo Vivarini (2019–2020)
- Gaetano Auteri (2020–2021)
- Massimo Carrera (2021)
- Gaetano Auteri (2021)
- Michele Mignani (2021–2023)
- Pasquale Marino (2023–2024)
- Giuseppe Iachini (2024)
- Federico Giampaolo (2024)
- Moreno Longo (2024-2025)
- Fabio Caserta (2025)
- Vincenzo Vivarini (2025)
- Moreno Longo (2026-current)

== Honours ==
- Serie B:
  - Champions: 1941–42, 2008–09
- Serie C
  - Champions: 1954–55, 1966–67, 1976–77, 1983–84, 2021–22
- Serie D
  - Champions: 1953–54, 2018–19

Mitropa Cup: 1

- Winners: 1990

== Divisional movements ==
Series	Years	Last	Promotions	Relegations
A	30	2010–11	-	▼12 (1929, 1933, 1941, 1950, 1961, 1964, 1970, 1986, 1992, 1996, 2001, 2011)
B	47	2022–23	▲12 (1928, 1931, 1935, 1942, 1958, 1963, 1969, 1985, 1989, 1994, 1997, 2009)	▼5 (1951, 1965, 1974, 1983, 2018✟)
C	11	2021–22	▲5 (1955, 1967, 1977, 1984, 2022)	▼1 (1952)
88 out of 91 years of professional football in Italy since 1929
D	3	2018–19	▲2 (1954, 2019)	never

== See also ==
- 2003–04 AS Bari season
- 2012–13 AS Bari season
