= List of SS Lazio players =

This is a list of notable footballers who have earned 100 or more caps for Società Sportiva Lazio.

== List of players ==
Players with 100 or more appearances for the club are listed by number of appearances. Appearances and goals are for all first-team competitive matches. Substitute appearances included. Bold denotes current players.

Statistics correct as of 30 July 2024.

Name	Nationality	Position^{[NB]}	Lazio career	Appearances	Goals
Ștefan Radu	Romania	Defender	2008–2023	427	8
Giuseppe Favalli	Italy	Defender	1992–2004	401	6
Giuseppe Wilson	Italy	Defender	1969–1978; 1978–1980	394	8
Paolo Negro	Italy	Defender	1993–2005	376	24
Senad Lulić	Bosnia and Herzegovina	Defender	2011–2021	371	34
Aldo Puccinelli	Italy	Forward	1940–1943; 1945–1955	342	78
Sergej Milinković-Savić	Serbia	Midfielder	2015–2023	341	69
Ciro Immobile	Italy	Forward	2016–2024	340	207
Luca Marchegiani	Italy	Goalkeeper	1993–2003	339	0
Vincenzo D'Amico	Italy	Midfielder	1971–1980; 1981–1986	338	51
Felipe Anderson	Brazil	Forward	2013–2018; 2021–2024	326	58
Cristian Daniel Ledesma	Italy / Argentina	Midfielder	2006–2015	318	14
Luis Alberto	Spain	Midfielder	2016–2024	307	52
Stefano Mauri	Italy	Midfielder	2006–2016	303	47
Tommaso Rocchi	Italy	Forward	2004–2013	293	105
Idilio Cei	Italy	Goalkeeper	1958–1968	287	0
Enrique Flamini	Italy / Argentina	Forward	1939–1943; 1946–1952; 1953–1954	283	44
Renzo Garlaschelli	Italy	Forward	1972–1982	276	64
**Adam Marušić**	Montenegro	Defender	2017–present	268	11
Marco Parolo	Italy	Midfielder	2014–2021	265	39
Romolo Alzani	Italy	Midfielder	1945–1955	263	7
Alessandro Nesta	Italy	Defender	1993–2002	261	3
Juan Carlos Morrone	Argentina	Forward	1960–1964; 1966–1971	259	52
Diego Zanetti	Italy	Defender	1961–1969	258	2
Bruno Giordano	Italy	Forward	1975–1985	254	108
Francesco Antonazzi	Italy	Defender	1945–1956	253	0
Ezio Sclavi	Italy	Goalkeeper	1923–1925; 1926–1934	253	0
Nello Governato	Italy	Midfielder	1961–1966; 1967–1971	251	17
Luigi Martini	Italy	Defender	1971–1979	249	10
Alfredo Monza	Italy	Defender	1935–1943	248	1
Giorgio Chinaglia	Italy	Forward	1969–1976	246	122
**Danilo Cataldi**	Italy	Midfielder	2013–present	246	10
Silvio Piola	Italy	Forward	1934–1943	243	149
Diego Fuser	Italy	Midfielder	1992–1998	242	42
Lionello Manfredonia	Italy	Defender	1975–1985	234	10
Angelo Peruzzi	Italy	Goalkeeper	2000–2007	226	0
Fernando Couto	Portugal	Defender	1998–2005	215	13
**Patric**	Spain	Defender	2015–present	210	5
Dejan Stanković	Serbia	Midfielder	1998–2004	208	34
Thomas Strakosha	Albania	Goalkeeper	2014–2022	208	0
Pavel Nedvěd	Czech Republic	Midfielder	1996–2001	207	51
Primo Sentimenti	Italy	Defender	1950–1957	201	9
Simone Inzaghi	Italy	Forward	1999–2005; 2005–2007; 2008–2010	196	55
Gabriele Pin	Italy	Midfielder	1986–1992	196	15
Giuseppe Signori	Italy	Forward	1992–1997	195	127
Lucas Leiva	Brazil	Midfielder	2017–2022	195	4
Federico Marchetti	Italy	Goalkeeper	2011–2018	194	0
Siniša Mihajlović	Serbia	Midfielder	1998–2004	193	33
Antonio Candreva	Italy	Midfielder	2012–2016	192	45
Salvador Gualtieri	Argentina	Midfielder	1940–1949	192	16
Goran Pandev	North Macedonia	Forward	2004–2009	191	64
Pierluigi Casiraghi	Italy	Forward	1993–1998	188	56
**Manuel Lazzari**	Italy	Defender	2019–present	188	6
Angelo Gregucci	Italy	Defender	1986–1993	187	12
Roberto Badiani	Italy	Midfielder	1974–1979; 1981–1983	181	6
Luciano Zauri	Italy	Defender	2003–2008; 2011–2013	177	6
Francesco Acerbi	Italy	Defender	2018–2023	173	10
Massimo Oddo	Italy	Defender	2002–2007	172	17
Pierluigi Pagni	Italy	Defender	1958–1961; 1962–68	172	1
Miroslav Klose	Germany	Forward	2011–2016	171	63
Lucidio Sentimenti	Italy	Goalkeeper	1949–1954	170	3
Giuseppe Baldo	Italy	Midfielder	1935–1942	169	8
Felice Pulici	Italy	Goalkeeper	1972–1977; 1981–1982	167	0
Fabio Liverani	Italy	Midfielder	2001–2006	165	10
Sebastiano Siviglia	Italy	Defender	2004–2010	158	10
Alen Bokšić	Croatia	Forward	1993–1996; 1997–2000	157	43
Hernanes	Brazil	Midfielder	2010–2014	154	40
Giuseppe Pancaro	Italy	Defender	1997–2003	152	6
Gabriele Podavini	Italy	Defender	1982–1987	149	7
Álvaro González	Uruguay	Midfielder	2010–2017	146	7
Luiz Felipe	Italy / Brazil	Defender	2016–2022	144	2
Claudio López	Argentina	Forward	2000–2004	143	38
Rubén Sosa	Uruguay	Forward	1988–1992	140	47
Felipe Caicedo	Ecuador	Forward	2017–2021	139	33
Keita	Senegal	Forward	2013–2017	137	31
Giuseppe Massa	Italy	Forward	1966–1972	137	31
Fernando Saraceni I	Italy	Defender	1907–1923	124	33
Roberto Mancini	Italy	Forward	1997–2000	136	24
Diego Simeone	Argentina	Midfielder	1999–2003	136	18
Roberto Lovati	Italy	Goalkeeper	1954; 1955–61	135	0
Anfilogino Guarisi	Italy / Brazil	Forward	1931–1936	134	43
Stefano Fiore	Italy	Midfielder	2001–2004	133	30
Lucas Biglia	Argentina	Midfielder	2013–2017	133	16
Claudio Sclosa	Italy	Midfielder	1988–1994	133	1
**Pedro**	Spain	Forward	2021–present	132	20
Giuliano Fortunato	Italy	Forward	1967–1972	132	16
Mauro Zárate	Argentina	Forward	2008–2011; 2012–2013	126	34
Mario Facco	Italy	Defender	1968–1974	126	6
Abdoulay Konko	France	Defender	2011–2016	126	1
Fernando Saraceni	Italy	Defender	1907-1924	124	36
Arcadio Spinozzi	Italy	Defender	1980–1986	123	0
Pasquale Vivolo	Italy	Forward	1953–1958	121	32
Fernando Viola	Italy	Midfielder	1976–1977; 1978–1982	121	13
César	Brazil	Defender	2001–2006	119	18
Stefan de Vrij	Netherlands	Defender	2014–2018	118	10
Marcelo Salas	Chile	Forward	1998–2001	117	49
Joaquín Correa	Argentina	Forward	2018–2022	117	30
**Mattia Zaccagni**	Italy	Forward	2021–present	117	22
Dušan Basta	Serbia	Defender	2014–2019	116	2
**Elseid Hysaj**	Albania	Defender	2021–present	112	2
Ogenyi Onazi	Nigeria	Midfielder	2011–2016	110	7
Claudio Bizzarri	Italy	Forward	1958–1963	109	19
Otávio Fantoni	Italy	Midfielder	1930–1935	108	5
Sergio Floccari	Italy	Forward	2010–2011; 2012–2014	106	31
Fulvio Bernardini	Italy	Midfielder	1923–1926	104	70
Aleksandar Kolarov	Serbia	Defender	2007–2010	104	11
Humberto Tozzi	Brazil	Forward	1956–1960	103	45
Alejandro Demaría	Brazil	Forward	1931–1935	103	29
Arne Selmosson	Sweden	Forward	1955–1958	101	31

== Club captains ==
Footballer	Position	Period
(Italy) Sante Ancherani	Forward	1901–1907
(Portugal) Francisco dos Santos	Midfielder	1907–1908
(Italy) Sante Ancherani	Forward	1908–1912
(Italy) Giuseppe Fioranti I	Defender	1912–1915
(Italy) Fernando Saraceni I	Defender	1915–1916
(Italy) Carlo Maranghi	Forward	1916–1919
(Italy) Giuseppe Fioranti I	Defender	1919–1922
(Italy) Augusto Faccani	Midfielder	1922–1923
(Italy) Augusto Parboni	Defender	1923–1925
(Italy) Fulvio Bernardini	Midfielder	1925–1926
(Hungary) Jenő Ligeti	Defender	1926–1927
(Italy) Renato Bottacini	Defender	1927–1928
(Italy) Carlo Cevenini V	Forward	1928–1929
(Italy) Piero Pastore	Forward	1929–1930
(Italy) Ezio Sclavi	Goalkeeper	1930–1933
(Italy) / (Brazil) Anfilogino Guarisi	Forward	1933–1934
(Italy) Attilio Ferraris IV	Midfielder	1934–1936
(Italy) Silvio Piola	Forward	1936–1943
(Argentina) Salvador Gualtieri	Midfielder	1943–1949
(Italy) / (Argentina) Enrique Flamini	Midfielder	1949–1952
(Italy) Lucidio Sentimenti IV	Goalkeeper	1952–1954
(Italy) Pasquale Vivolo	Forward	1954–1958
(Italy) Roberto Lovati	Goalkeeper	1958–1959
(Brazil) Humberto Tozzi	Forward	1959–1960
(Italy) Francesco Janich	Defender	1960–1961
(Italy) Gianni Seghedoni	Defender	1961–1962
(Italy) Claudio Bizzarri	Forward	1962–1963
(Italy) Graziano Landoni	Midfielder	1963–1964
(Italy) Pierluigi Pagni	Defender	1964–1965
(Italy) Nello Governato	Midfielder	1965–1966
(Italy) Pierluigi Pagni	Defender	1966–1968
(Italy) Diego Zanetti	Defender	1968–1969
(Italy) Ferruccio Mazzola	Midfielder	1969–1971
(Italy) Giuseppe Wilson	Defender	1971–1974
(Italy) Giorgio Chinaglia	Forward	1974–1975
(Italy) Giuseppe Wilson	Defender	1975–1978
(Italy) Luigi Martini	Defender	1978
(Italy) Giuseppe Wilson	Defender	1978–1980
(Italy) Alberto Bigon	Midfielder	1980–1981
(Italy) Vincenzo D'Amico	Defender	1981–1983
(Brazil) Batista	Midfielder	1983–1984
(Italy) Bruno Giordano	Forward	1984–1985
(Italy) Gabriele Podavini	Defender	1985–1987
(Italy) Domenico Caso	Midfielder	1987–1988
(Italy) Raimondo Marino	Defender	1988–1989
(Italy) Gabriele Pin	Midfielder	1989–1992
(Italy) Angelo Gregucci	Defender	1992–1993
(Italy) Claudio Sclosa	Midfielder	1993–1994
(Italy) Giuseppe Signori	Forward	1994–1997
(Italy) Diego Fuser	Midfielder	1997–1998
(Italy) Alessandro Nesta	Defender	1998–2002
(Italy) Giuseppe Favalli	Defender	2002–2004
(Portugal) Fernando Couto	Defender	2004–2005
(Brazil) César	Defender	2005–2006
(Italy) Fabio Liverani	Midfielder	2006
(Italy) Massimo Oddo	Defender	2006–2007
(Italy) Luciano Zauri	Defender	2007–2008
(Italy) Tommaso Rocchi	Forward	2008–2013
(Italy) Stefano Mauri	Midfielder	2013–2015
(Argentina) Lucas Biglia	Midfielder	2015–2017
(Bosnia and Herzegovina) Senad Lulić	Defender	2017–2021
(Italy) Ciro Immobile	Forward	2021–2024
(Italy) Mattia Zaccagni	Midfielder	2024–
