= List of SS Lazio records and statistics =

This is a list of records and statistics in relation to the Italian football club Società Sportiva Lazio.

== All time ==
=== Divisional movements ===
Series	Years	First	Last	Promotions	Relegations
A	84	1929–30	2026–27	–	▼5 (1960–61, 1966–67, 1970–71, 1979–80, 1984–85)
B	11	1961–62	1987–88	▲6 (1926–27, 1962–63, 1968–69, 1971–72, 1982–83, 1987–88)	never
95 years of professional football in Italy since 1929

=== Total appearances ===
Statistics accurate as of 24 August 2026.

Player	Matches
(Romania) Ștefan Radu	427
(Italy) Giuseppe Favalli	401
(Italy) Giuseppe Wilson	394
(Italy) Paolo Negro	376
(Bosnia and Herzegovina) Senad Lulić	371
(Montenegro) Adam Marušić	356
(Italy) Aldo Puccinelli	342
(Serbia) Sergej Milinković-Savić	341
(Italy) Ciro Immobile	340
(Italy) Luca Marchegiani	339

=== Total goals ===
Statistics accurate as of 26 May 2024.

Player	Goals
(Italy) Ciro Immobile	207
(Italy) Silvio Piola	159
(Italy) Giuseppe Signori	127
(Italy) Giorgio Chinaglia	124
(Italy) Bruno Giordano	116
(Italy) Tommaso Rocchi	105
(Italy) Aldo Puccinelli	79
(Serbia) Sergej Milinković-Savić	69
(Italy) Renzo Garlaschelli	67
(Italy) Fulvio Bernardini	67

== Serie A record ==
Scudetti: 2

- 1973–74, 1999–2000

=== Total Serie A appearances ===
Statistics accurate as of 24 August 2026.

Player	Matches
(Romania) Ștefan Radu	349
(Italy) Aldo Puccinelli	319
(Italy) Giuseppe Favalli	298
(Italy) Giuseppe Wilson	286
(Bosnia and Herzegovina) Senad Lulić	282
(Montenegro) Adam Marušić	281
(Argentina) (Italy) Enrique Flamini	272
(Italy) Ciro Immobile	270
(Serbia) Sergej Milinković-Savić	267
(Italy) Paolo Negro	264

=== Total Serie A goals ===
Statistics accurate as of 26 May 2024.

Player	Goals
(Italy) Ciro Immobile	169
(Italy) Silvio Piola	143
(Italy) Giuseppe Signori	107
(Italy) Tommaso Rocchi	82
(Italy) Giorgio Chinaglia	77
(Italy) Aldo Puccinelli	77
(Italy) Bruno Giordano	68
(Serbia) Sergej Milinković-Savić	57
(Germany) Miroslav Klose	54
(Italy) Renzo Garlaschelli	49

== European record ==
=== Statistics in European competitions ===
UEFA Cup Winners' Cup: 1

- 1998–99

UEFA Super Cup: 1

- 1999

Coppa delle Alpi: 1

- 1971

=== Total European appearances ===
Statistics accurate as of 17 April 2025.

Player	Matches
(Italy) Paolo Negro	64
(Bosnia and Herzegovina) Senad Lulić	58
(Italy) Luca Marchegiani	58
(Italy) Giuseppe Favalli	57
(Montenegro) Adam Marušić	51
(Romania) Ștefan Radu	49
(Serbia) Sergej Milinković-Savić	49
(Italy) Giuseppe Pancaro	49
(Serbia and Montenegro) Dejan Stanković	48
(Spain) Luis Alberto	47
(Brazil) Felipe Anderson	47

=== Total European goals ===
Statistics accurate as of 26 May 2024.

Player	Goals
(Italy) Ciro Immobile	26
(Italy) Simone Inzaghi	20
(Czech Republic) Pavel Nedvěd	14
(Italy) Tommaso Rocchi	14
(Czech Republic) Libor Kozák	11
(Italy) Giorgio Chinaglia	11
(Italy) Pierluigi Casiraghi	10
(Spain) Pedro	10
(Argentina) Claudio López	9
(Brazil) Felipe Anderson	9

== National cup record ==
Coppa Italia: 7

- 1958, 1997–98, 1999–2000, 2003–04, 2008–09, 2012–13, 2018–19

Supercoppa Italiana: 5

- 1998, 2000, 2009, 2017, 2019

=== Total national cup appearances ===
Statistics accurate as of 26 May 2024 and include both Coppa Italia and Supercoppa Italiana matches.

Player	Matches
(Italy) Giuseppe Wilson	58
(Italy) Vincenzo D'Amico	55
(Italy) Paolo Negro	48
(Italy) Giuseppe Favalli	46
(Italy) Bruno Giordano	43
(Italy) Luigi Martini	39
(Italy) Renzo Garlaschelli	38
(Italy) Luca Marchegiani	38
(Switzerland) Guerino Gottardi	34
(Bosnia and Herzegovina) Senad Lulić	31
(Italy) Roberto Badiani	31

=== Total national cup goals ===
Statistics accurate as of 26 May 2024 and include both Coppa Italia and Supercoppa Italiana goals.

Player	Goals
(Italy) Bruno Giordano	18
(Italy) Giuseppe Signori	17
(Italy) Giorgio Chinaglia	13
(Italy) Ciro Immobile	12
(Brazil) (Italy) Humberto Tozzi	12
(Italy) Tommaso Rocchi	11
(Italy) Vincenzo D'Amico	11
(North Macedonia) Goran Pandev	10
(Italy) Renzo Garlaschelli	9
(Croatia) Alen Bokšić	8

== Capocannonieri ==
List of Capocannonieri (Serie A top scorers).

Statistics accurate as of 2 June 2024.

Season	Player	Goals	Matches
1936–37	(Italy) Silvio Piola	21	28
1942–43	(Italy) Silvio Piola	21	22
1973–74	(Italy) Giorgio Chinaglia	24	30
1978–79	(Italy) Bruno Giordano	19	30
1992–93	(Italy) Giuseppe Signori	26	32
1993–94	(Italy) Giuseppe Signori	23	24
1995–96	(Italy) Giuseppe Signori	24 (joint most)	31
2000–01	(Argentina) Hernán Crespo	26	32
2017–18	(Italy) Ciro Immobile	29 (joint most)	33
2019–20	(Italy) Ciro Immobile	36	37
2021–22	(Italy) Ciro Immobile	27	31

== Club records ==
Statistics accurate as of 1 August 2020.

- Largest victory:
  - 13–1 v Pro Roma, Prima Categoria, 10 November 1912.
- Largest defeat:
  - 1–8 v Internazionale, Serie A, 18 March 1934.
    0–7 v Internazionale, Serie A, 5 March 1961.
- Most points in a season:
  - 78 (2019–20)
- Fewest points in a season:
  - 15 (1984–85)
- Most victories in a season:
  - 24 (2019–20)
- Fewest victories in a season:
  - 2 (1984–85)
- Most defeats in a season:
  - 21 (1960–61)
- Fewest defeats in a season:
  - 3 (1972–73)
- Most goals scored in a season:
  - 89 (2017–18)
- Fewest goals scored in a season:
  - 16 (1984–85)
- Most goals conceded in a season:
  - 66 (1933–34)
- Fewest goals conceded in a season:
  - 16 (1972–73)
