= 1973–74 SS Lazio season =

Societa Sportiva Lazio
1973–74 season
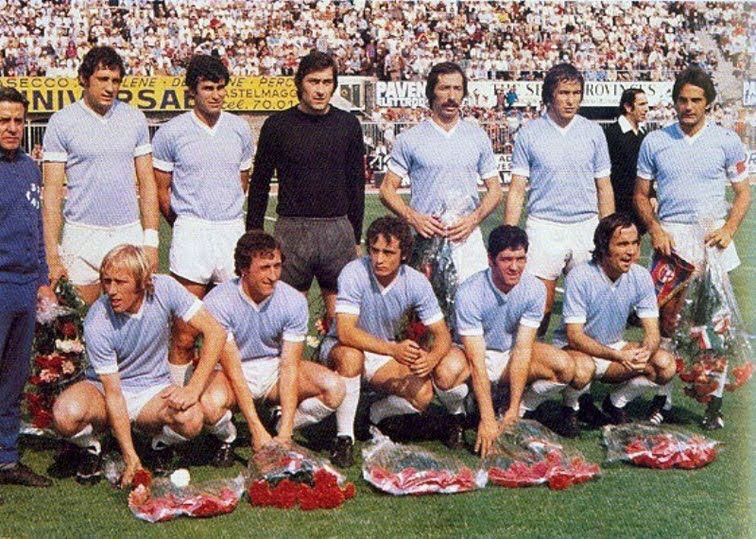
- Chairman: Umberto Lenzini
- Manager: Tommaso Maestrelli
- Stadium: Stadio Olimpico
- Serie A: 1st
- Coppa Italia: Second round
- UEFA Cup: Round of 16
- Top goalscorer: League: Chinaglia (24); All: Chinaglia (34)
- Average home league attendance: 49,833
Home colours	Away colours

During the 1973–74 season SS Lazio competed in Serie A, Coppa Italia and UEFA Cup.

== Summary ==
Back to Serie A in 1973, Lazio immediately emerged as surprise challengers for the Scudetto to Milan and Juventus previous season, only losing out on the final day of the season, with a team comprising captain Giuseppe Wilson, as well as midfielders Luciano Re Cecconi and Mario Frustalupi, striker Giorgio Chinaglia who led the top Italian league in scoring with 24 goals, and head coach Tommaso Maestrelli. Lazio improved such successes this season, ensuring its first title in 74 years.

In UEFA Cup the team advanced to the second round. Then they faced English squad Ipswich Town in a bizarre series they never forget. Lazio came to Portman Road for the first leg. Coach Tommaso Maestrelli made changes to tighten his defence. They backfired. Ipswich established a 4–0 lead with Trevor Whymark scoring all four goals. The fourth was hotly disputed by the angry Italians who claimed that Whymark had handled the ball. It was a rugged match.

Sightseeing in Rome went smoothly for the return leg. It was when Ipswich had their first training session in Rome that the flames of Lazio fury were ignited. A delegation from the AC Roma supporters, Lazio's big rivals, arrived to make a presentation with Press photographers present. Pietro Magliocchetti, their president, handed Whymark a trophy with the following inscription. "To Whymark in recognition of Ipswich v Lazio 4–0. Il Roma Club FC 12" Giallorossa, with affection and gratitude. There was an atmosphere of intimidation in the Olympic Stadium. Whymark took a blow to the head early on and Bryan Hamilton later admitted that he was "genuinely scared" by Lazio's physical and violent approach.

Lazio opened the scoring in 43 seconds and added another in nine minutes. A third goal after 26 minutes brought the Italians back into the game. They were pegged back after 73 minutes when Dutch referee Leo van der Kroft awarded what Lazio felt was a soft penalty after Clive Woods had been tripped. Colin Viljoen calmly converted the spot kick. Whymark went to congratulate him and was chased back into his own goalmouth by enraged Lazio players.

Giorgio Chinaglia, the Lazio captain and super star, scored a penalty in the 82nd minute to set up a tense finish although the Italians had to score two more because of the away-goal rule. Johnson was on the bench. He was spat on by an Italian which made him determined to play his part on the field despite his injury which had not fully healed.

In injury-time Johnson scored for Ipswich to clinch a 6–4 overall success.

The Lazio fans got onto the pitch despite a metal fence and a moat. They threw full beer cans and lighted rockets at the Police who used tear gas in a forlorn effort to maintain control. The Italian Press had a heading "Thugs of the Olimpico" and "Madness at Stadio Olimpico."

The riot proved ever so costly for Lazio. That season they went on to win the Scudetto but were banned by UEFA from playing in the European Cup.

== Squad ==
Note: Flags indicate national team as defined under FIFA eligibility rules; some limited exceptions apply. Players may hold more than one non-FIFA nationality.

Pos.	Nation	Player
GK	ITA	Giuseppe Avagliano
GK	ITA	Avelino Moriggi
GK	ITA	Felice Pulici
DF	ITA	Mario Facco
DF	ITA	Domenico Labrocca
DF	ITA	Luigi Martini
DF	ITA	Giancarlo Oddi
DF	ITA	Giustino Paris
DF	ITA	Sergio Petrelli
DF	ITA	Luigi Polentes
DF	ITA	Giuliano Tinaburri
DF	ITA	Giuseppe Wilson
MF	ITA	Sergio Borgo

Pos.	Nation	Player
MF	ITA	Vincenzo D'Amico
MF	ITA	Mario Frustalupi
MF	ITA	Fausto Inselvini
MF	ITA	Pierpaolo Manservisi
MF	ITA	Ferruccio Mazzola
MF	ITA	Franco Nanni
MF	ITA	Luciano Re Cecconi
MF	ITA	Franco Tripodi
FW	ITA	Vito Chimenti
FW	ITA	Giorgio Chinaglia
FW	ITA	Paolo Franzoni
FW	ITA	Renzo Garlaschelli

== Competitions ==
=== Serie A ===
==== Results by round ====
Round	1	2	3	4	5	6	7	8	9	10	11	12	13	14	15	16	17	18	19	20	21	22	23	24	25	26	27	28	29	30
Ground	A	H	A	H	A	H	A	H	H	A	H	A	H	A	H	A	A	H	A	H	A	H	A	A	H	A	H	A	H	A
Result	W	W	L	D	D	D	W	W	W	W	W	W	L	W	W	W	L	W	D	W	L	W	W	D	W	D	W	L	W	D
Position	1	1	1	2	4	5	4	3	1	1	1	1	1	1	1	1	1	1	1	1	1	1	1	1	1	1	1	1	1	1

Source: Competitive matches
A = Away; H = Home; W = Win; D = Draw; L = Loss; P = Postponed; = Leader; = 1974–75 UEFA Cup; = 1974–75 Serie B

==== League table ====
Pos	Team	Pld	W	D	L	GF	GA	GD	Pts	Qualification or relegation
1	Lazio (C)	30	18	7	5	45	23	+22	43	Disqualified from the European Cup
2	Juventus	30	16	9	5	50	26	+24	41	Qualification to UEFA Cup
3	Napoli	30	12	12	6	35	28	+7	36	Qualification to UEFA Cup
4	Internazionale	30	12	11	7	47	33	+14	35	Qualification to UEFA Cup
5	Torino	30	10	14	6	27	24	+3	34	Qualification to UEFA Cup

Source: Panini
(C) Champions

==== Matches ====
7 October 1973 1	Lanerossi	0–3	Lazio	Vicenza
15:00 UTC+2		Report	7' Chinaglia; 62' Re Cecconi; 86' Garlaschelli	Stadium: Stadio Romeo Menti; Referee: Michelotti

14 October 1973 2	Lazio	1–0	Sampdoria	Rome
15:00 UTC+2	Wilson 83'	Report		Stadium: Stadio Olimpico; Referee: Casarin

28 October 1973 3	Juventus	3–1	Lazio	Turin
15:00 UTC+2	Altafini 50'; Bettega 62'; Cuccureddu 86'	Report	45' Chinaglia	Stadium: Comunale; Referee: C. Lo Bello

4 November 1973 4	Lazio	0–0	Fiorentina	Rome
15:00 UTC+2		Report		Stadium: Stadio Olimpico; Referee: Gonella

18 November 1973 5	Cesena	0–0	Lazio	Cesena
15:00 UTC+2		Report		Stadium: Stadio La Fiorita; Referee: Branzoni

25 November 1973 6	Lazio	1–1	Inter	Rome
15:00 UTC+2	Chinaglia 28'	Report	75' Bedin	Stadium: Stadio Olimpico; Referee: Panzino

2 December 1973 7	Cagliari	0–1	Lazio	Cagliari
15:00 UTC+1		Report	21' Chinaglia	Stadium: Stadio Sant'Elia; Referee: Giunti

9 December 1973 8	Lazio	2–1	Roma	Rome
15:00 UTC+1	Franzoni 46'; Chinaglia 68'	Report	34' Negrisolo	Stadium: Stadio Olimpico; Referee: C. Lo Bello

16 December 1973 9	Lazio	1–0	Napoli	Rome
15:00 UTC+1	Chinaglia 76'	Report		Stadium: Stadio Olimpico; Referee: Michelotti

23 December 1973 10	Hellas Verona	0–1	Lazio	Verona
15:00 UTC+1		Report	36' Garlaschelli	Stadium: Stadio Marcantonio Bentegodi; Referee: Gonella

30 December 1973 11	Lazio	1–0	Milan	Rome
15:00 UTC+1	Re Cecconi 90'	Report		Stadium: Stadio Olimpico; Referee: Ciacci

6 January 1974 12	Genoa	1–2	Lazio	Genova
15:00 UTC+1	S. Corradi 52' (pen.)	Report	18', 70' Garlaschelli	Stadium: Stadio Luigi Ferraris; Referee: Motta

13 January 1974 13	Lazio	0–1	Torino	Rome
15:00 UTC+1		Report	55' F. Graziani	Stadium: Stadio Olimpico; Referee: Giunti

20 January 1974 14	Foggia	0–1	Lazio	Foggia
15:00 UTC+1		Report	86' Chinaglia	Stadium: Stadio Pino Zaccheria; Referee: Torelli

27 January 1974 15	Lazio	4–0	Bologna	Rome
15:00 UTC+1	Garlaschelli 4'; D'Amico 60'; Chinaglia 75', 89'	Report		Stadium: Stadio Olimpico; Referee: Mascali

3 February 1974 16	Lazio	3–0	Lanerossi	Rome
15:00 UTC+1	Garlaschelli 10'; F. Berni 69' (o.g.); Chinaglia 80'	Report		Stadium: Stadio Olimpico; Referee: Branzoni

10 February 1974 17	Sampdoria	1–0	Lazio	Genova
15:00 UTC+2	Maraschi 72'	Report		Stadium: Stadio Luigi Ferraris; Referee: Gialluisi

17 February 1974 18	Lazio	3–1	Juventus	Rome
15:00 UTC+2	Garlaschelli 5'; Chinaglia 27', 66' (pen.)	Report	55' (pen.) Anastasi	Stadium: Stadio Olimpico; Referee: Panzino

3 March 1974 19	Fiorentina	1–1	Lazio	Florence
15:00 UTC+2	Desolati 41'	Report	64' (pen.) Chinaglia	Stadium: Comunale; Referee: C. Lo Bello

10 March 1974 20	Lazio	2–0	Cesena	Rome
15:00 UTC+2	Chinaglia 35'; Nanni 40'	Report		Stadium: Stadio Olimpico; Referee: Agnolin

17 March 1974 21	Inter	3–1	Lazio	Milan
15:00 UTC+2	Fedele 5'; Oriali 32'; G. Mariani 69'	Report	51' Garlaschelli	Stadium: Stadio San Siro; Referee: Michelotti

24 March 1974 22	Lazio	2–0	Cagliari	Rome
15:00 UTC+1	Chinaglia 24', 80' (pen.)	Report		Stadium: Stadio Olimpico; Referee: Torelli

31 March 1974 23	Roma	1–2	Lazio	Rome
15:00 UTC+1	F. Pulici 5' (o.g.)	Report	47' D'Amico; 50' Chinaglia	Stadium: Stadio Olimpico; Referee: Gonella

7 April 1974 24	Napoli	3–3	Lazio	Naples
15:00 UTC+1	Clerici 18', 53' (pen.); Juliano 25'	Report	23', 41', 63' (pen.) Chinaglia	Stadium: Stadio San Paolo; Referee: Ciacci

14 April 1974 25	Lazio	4–2	Hellas Verona	Rome
15:00 UTC+1	Bet 8' (o.g.); Garlaschelli 49'; Nanni 76'; Chinaglia 78'	Report	25' Zigoni; 43' (o.g.) Oddi	Stadium: Stadio Olimpico; Referee: Giunti

21 April 1974 26	Milan	0–0	Lazio	Milan
15:00 UTC+1		Report		Stadium: San Siro; Referee: Picasso

28 April 1974 27	Lazio	1–0	Genoa	Rome
15:00 UTC+1	Garlaschelli 43'	Report		Stadium: Stadio Olimpico; Referee: Bernardis

5 May 1974 28	Torino	2–1	Lazio	Turin
15:00 UTC+1	P. Pulici 13', 43'	Report	32' Chinaglia	Stadium: Comunale; Referee: Gussoni

12 May 1974 29	Lazio	1–0	Foggia	Rome
15:00 UTC+1	Chinaglia 60' (pen.)	Report		Stadium: Stadio Olimpico; Referee: Panzino

19 May 1974 30	Bologna	2–2	Lazio	Bologna
15:00 UTC+1	G. Savoldi 19'; Pecci 45'	Report	7' Petrelli; 48' Chinaglia	Stadium: Stadio Renato Dall'Ara; Referee: Paolo Toselli

=== Coppa Italia ===
==== First round ====
===== Group 2 =====
Team	Pt
1. Lazio	5
2. Brescia	5
3. Varese	4
4. Roma	4
5. Novara	2

29 August 1973 1	Lazio	1–0	Varese	Rome
21:00 UTC+1	Facco 32'			Stadium: Stadio Olimpico; Referee: Levrero

2 September 1973 2	Brescia	2–0	Lazio	Brescia
19:00 UTC+1	Bellotto 46', 53'			Stadium: Stadio Mario Rigamonti; Referee: Toselli

9 September 1973 3	Roma	0–0	Lazio	Rome
21:00 UTC+1				Stadium: Stadio Olimpico; Referee: Gussoni

23 September 1973 5	Lazio	6–0	Novara	Rome
21:00 UTC+1	Chinaglia 40', 51'; Garlaschelli 54', 81'; Martini 44'; F. Mazzola 88'			Stadium: Stadio Olimpico; Referee: Panzino

==== Second round ====
===== Group B =====
Team	Pt
1. Palermo	8
2. Juventus	7
3. Cesena	5
4. Lazio	4

12 December 1973 1	Cesena	2–1	Lazio	Cesena
21:00 UTC+1	Scungio 1'; Zaniboni 83'		62' Chinaglia	Stadium: Stadio La Fiorita; Referee: Picasso

23 January 1974 2	Lazio	0–0	Juventus	Rome
15:00 UTC+1				Stadium: Stadio Olimpico; Referee: Bernadis

6 February 1974 3	Lazio	1–0	Palermo	Rome
15:00 UTC+1	Viganò 14' (o.g.)			Stadium: Stadio Olimpico; Referee: Reggiani

20 February 1974 4	Lazio	1–1	Cesena	Rome
15:00 UTC+1	Chinaglia 88' (pen.)		3' Tombolato	Stadium: Stadio Olimpico; Referee: Cantelli

27 March 1974 5	Juventus	3–0	Lazio	Turin
15:00 UTC+1	Bettega 1', 55'; Causio 75'			Stadium: Stadio Comunale; Referee: Lazzaroni

1 May 1974 6	Palermo	2–0	Lazio	Palermo
15:00 UTC+1	Vanello 43'; S. Magistrelli 49'			Stadium: Stadio La Favorita; Referee: Lenardon

=== UEFA Cup ===
==== First round ====
19 September 1973	Lazio	3–0	(Switzerland) Sion	Rome
21:00 UTC+1	Chinaglia 2', 22' (pen.), 25' (pen.)			Stadium: Stadio Olimpico; Referee: (Malta)

3 October 1973	Sion	3–1	Lazio	Sion
21:00 UTC+1	Isoz 14', 90'; Barberis 57'		10' Garlaschelli	Stadium: Stade Tourbillon; Referee: (Germany)

==== Second round ====
24 October 1973	(England) Ipswich Town	4–0	Lazio	Ipswich
21:00 UTC+1	Whymark 16', 42', 47', 56'			Stadium: Portman Road; Referee: (Sweden)

7 November 1973	Lazio	4–2	(England) Ipswich Town	Rome
21:00 UTC+1	Garlaschelli 1'; Chinaglia 26', 83' (pen.), 86'		70' (pen.) Viljoen; 90' D. Johnson	Stadium: Stadio Olimpico; Referee: (Netherlands)

== Statistics ==
=== Players statistics ===
No.	Pos	Nat	Player	Total		1973-74 Serie A	
No.	Pos	Nat	Player	Apps	Goals	Apps	Goals
	GK	(Italy) ITA	Pulici	30	-23	30	-23
	DF	(Italy) ITA	Martini	28	0	28	0
	DF	(Italy) ITA	Oddi	30	0	30	0
	DF	(Italy) ITA	Wilson	30	1	30	1
	DF	(Italy) ITA	Petrelli	22	1	22	1
	MF	(Italy) ITA	Re Cecconi	23	2	23	2
	MF	(Italy) ITA	Frustalupi	30	0	30	0
	MF	(Italy) ITA	Nanni	30	2	30	2
	FW	(Italy) ITA	D'Amico	27	2	22+5	2
	FW	(Italy) ITA	Chinaglia	30	24	30	24
	FW	(Italy) ITA	Garlaschelli	29	10	29	10
	GK	(Italy) ITA	Moriggi	0	0	0	0
	DF	(Italy) ITA	Facco	6	0	6	0
	DF	(Italy) ITA	Polentes	9	0	5+4	0
	MF	(Italy) ITA	Borgo	1	0	0+1	0
	MF	(Italy) ITA	Inselvini	11	0	9+2	0
	FW	(Italy) ITA	Manservisi	4	0	4	0
	FW	(Italy) ITA	Franzoni	10	1	2+8	1
	MF	(Italy) ITA	Tripodi	1	0	0+1	0
	MF	(Italy) ITA	Mazzola	0	0	0	0
	GK	(Italy) ITA	Avagliano	0	0	0	0
	DF	(Italy) ITA	Labrocca				
	DF	(Italy) ITA	Paris				
	DF	(Italy) ITA	Tinaburri				
	FW	(Italy) ITA	Chimenti				

- Source: http://calcio-seriea.net/presenze/1973/733/
