= Viggiano (surname) =

Viggiano is an Italian surname. Notable people with the surname include:

- Carolina Viggiano (born 1968), Mexican politician
- Jeffrey Viggiano (born 1984), retired American-born Italian professional basketball player
- Paul M. Viggiano (born 1943), American politician
- Tom Viggiano (born ?), American former ice hockey player and head coach

== See also ==
- Viganò (surname)
- Vigliano (surname)
