= Saraceni =

Saraceni is a surname. Notable people with the surname include:

- Carlo Saraceni (1579–1620), Italian painter
- Enrico Saraceni (born 1964), Italian athlete
- Fernando Saraceni (1891–1956), Italian footballer
- Giovanni Michele Saraceni (1498–1568), Italian Roman Catholic cardinal
- Giulio Saraceni (d. 1640), Italian Roman Catholic bishop
- Julio Saraceni (1912–1998), Argentine film director
- Ottavio Saraceni (d. 1623), Italian Roman Catholic bishop
- Paulo César Saraceni (1933–2012), Brazilian film director and screenwriter
