= Luciano Re Cecconi =

Italian footballer (1948–1977)

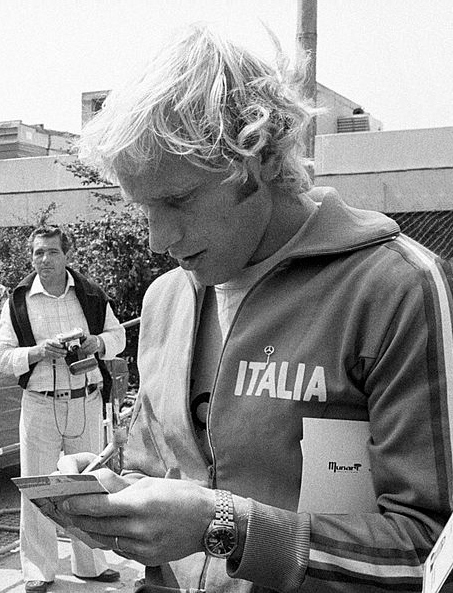
- Luciano Re Cecconi at the 1974 World Cup

Personal information
- Date of birth: 1 December 1948
- Place of birth: Nerviano, Italy
- Date of death: 18 January 1977 (aged 28)
- Place of death: Rome, Italy
- Position: Midfielder

Youth career
- Pro Patria

Senior career*
Years	Team	Apps	(Gls)
1967–1969	Pro Patria	36	(?)
1969–1972	Foggia	74	(2)
1972–1977	Lazio	109	(7)

International career
1974	Italy	2	(0)
- * Club domestic league appearances and goals

Luciano Re Cecconi (Italian pronunciation: [luˈtʃaːno ˈre ttʃekˈkoːni]; 1 December 1948 – 18 January 1977) was an Italian footballer, who played as a midfielder. A fast, strong, athletic, and hardworking player, known for his speed, tenacity, and stamina, he functioned as a box-to-box midfielder or as a defensive or central midfielder for his teams. He was also known for his sense of humour throughout his career, and was nicknamed l'Angelo Biondo (lit. 'The Blond Angel'), for the colour of his hair.

== Club career ==
Re Cecconi made his debut for Pro Patria, then in Serie C, on 14 April 1968, and subsequently moved to Foggia, which he helped to promotion from Serie B to Serie A in the 1969–70 season (they were relegated again the following year). In 1972, he joined S.S. Lazio. He was a key member of the Lazio title-winning side of the 1973–74 Serie A season, for which he scored two goals and made 23 appearances. He also won the league with the under-21 side during 1973–74 season.

== International career ==
Re Cecconi was called up for Italy's squad for the 1974 World Cup, and he won two caps in total during the following season in friendly matches in 1974. He also played for the Italian under-23 side, in addition to being in the Italy national squad at the 1974 World Cup.

== Death ==
Re Cecconi was shot dead in Rome on 18 January 1977, following a practical joke of robbing a jewelry shop. Along with his teammate Pietro Ghedin and another friend, he entered Bruno Tabocchini's jewelry shop and, according to the official reconstruction, jokingly said "hands up, this is a robbery", wearing no mask and having no gun in his hand. Tabocchini, who had recently been the victim of genuine robberies, wasn't a football fan so he didn't recognize him and immediately responded by shooting him in the chest. He was later acquitted on the grounds of putative self-defense. Family members, friends and teammates have always expressed doubts about the fact that a discreet and sensible person like Re Cecconi could have played such a prank on someone he didn't know, a reckless behavior during the Years of Lead when attacks and robberies were very frequent and many shopkeepers lived in constant fear.

== Honours ==
Lazio

- Serie A: 1973–74
