= Carolina Viggiano =

Mexican politician (born 1968)

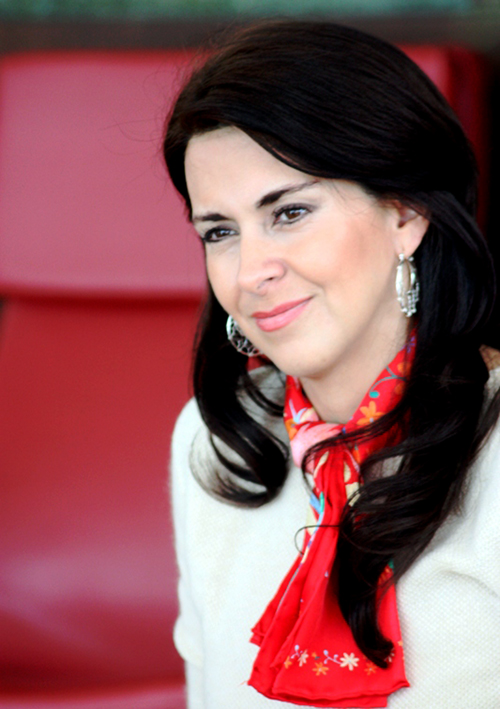

Senator of the Congress of the Union for Hidalgo
- Incumbent
- Assumed office 1 September 2024
- Preceded by: Nuvia Mayorga Delgado

Personal details
- Born: 6 July 1968 (age 58) Tepehuacán de Guerrero, Hidalgo, Mexico
- Party: PRI
- Spouse: Rubén Moreira Valdez
- Education: UAEH
- Occupation: Politician

Alma Carolina Viggiano Austria (Note: In this Mexican name, the surname is Viggiano and the second or maternal family name is Austria.) (born 6 July 1968) is a Mexican politician from the Institutional Revolutionary Party (PRI). In 2024 she was elected to represent her home state of Hidalgo in the Senate for the 2024–2030 term.

== Political career ==
Viggiano was born in Tepehuacán de Guerrero, Hidalgo, in 1968 and holds a degree in law from the Autonomous University of Hidalgo (UAEH). She served as a local deputy in the Congress of Hidalgo from 1996 to 1999.

She has since served in the federal Chamber of Deputies on four occasions: during the 58th Congress (2000–2002), for Hidalgo's first district; the 61st Congress (2009–2012), for Hidalgo's sixth district; the 63rd Congress (2015–2018), again for Hidalgo's first district; and the 65rd Congress (2021–2024), as a plurinominal deputy for the fifth region.

In 2022 she contended for the governorship of Hidalgo, representing a coalition of the PRI, PAN and PRD, but lost by a wide margin to Julio Menchaca Salazar of the National Regeneration Movement (Morena).

Viggiano Austria sought election as one of Hidalgo's senators in the 2024 Senate election, occupying the first place on the Fuerza y Corazón por México coalition's two-name formula. The coalition placed second, securing Viggiano the state's third Senate seat for the 2024–2030 term.

== Personal life ==
Viggiano is married to Rubén Moreira Valdez, who served as governor of Coahuila from 2011 to 2017 and was elected to successive terms in the Chamber of Deputies in 2021 and 2024.
