= Sergio Petrelli =

Italian footballer

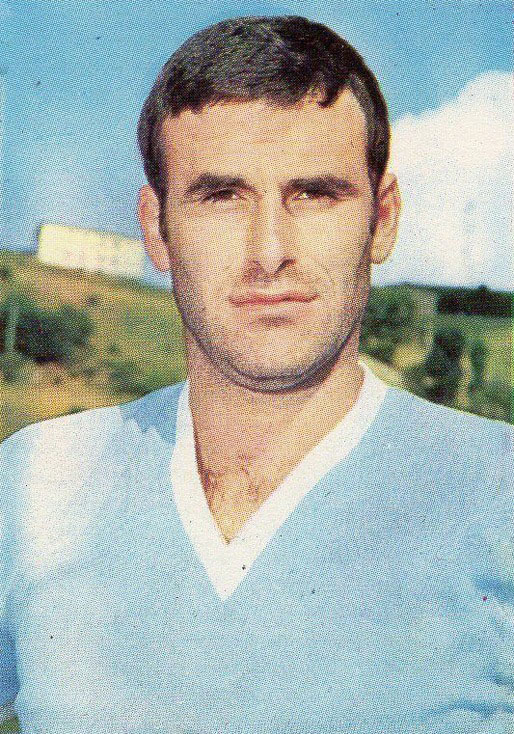
- Petrelli with S.S. Lazio in 1973

Personal information
- Full name: Sergio Petrelli
- Date of birth: July 27, 1944 (age 82)
- Place of birth: Ascoli Piceno, Italy
- Position: Defender

Senior career*
Years	Team	Apps	(Gls)
1964–1965	Carrarese	22	(0)
1965–1966	Pisa	24	(5)
1966–1969	Verona	90	(7)
1969–1972	Roma	64	(5)
1972–1976	Lazio	47	(9)
1976–1977	Anconitana	18	(0)
1977–1978	Tortoreto	?	(?)
1978–1982	L'Aquila	11	(0)
- * Club domestic league appearances and goals

Sergio Petrelli (born July 27, 1944 in Ascoli Piceno) is a former Italian professional footballer who played as a defender. He played for 8 seasons (138 games, 10 goals) in the Serie A for Hellas Verona F.C., A.S. Roma and S.S. Lazio.

During the season when he won the championship with Lazio, on the night before the Derby della Capitale game against A.S. Roma, some Roma fans went to the hotel where Lazio players were staying and began to make noise to disrupt Lazio's sleep. Petrelli was one of the players who fired some gunshots at the streetlights to scare them away. Petrelli previously played for Roma and even scored a goal for them in a previous edition of Derby della Capitale.

== Honours ==
Lazio

- Serie A: 1973–74
