= Vigliano =

Vigiliano may refer to:

- Vigliano (surname), Italian surname

== Places in Italy ==
- Vigliano d'Asti
- Vigliano Biellese
