= Viganò (surname) =

Viganò is an Italian surname. Notable people with the surname include:

- Carlo Maria Viganò (born 1941), Italian Roman Catholic prelate, Vatican official
- Dario Edoardo Viganò (born 1962), Italian writer and Catholic priest, director of the Vatican Television Center.
- Davide Viganò (born 1984), Italian cyclist
- Giuseppe Ettore Viganò (1853-1933), Italian general and minister
- Maria Viganò (1769–1821), Austrian ballet dancer, spouse of Salvatore Viganò.
- Paolo Viganò (1950–2014), Italian footballer
- Salvatore Viganò (1769–1821), Italian choreographer, dancer and composer
