= List of Serie A players with 100 or more goals =

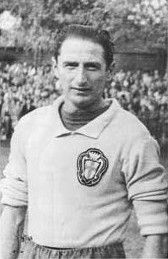
Silvio Piola has scored the most goals in Serie A.

This is a list of players who scored over 100 goals in Serie A, Italy's top flight football league, during its history starting from the 1929–30 season. Giuseppe Meazza was the first player to reach both 100 and 200 goals in Serie A. Since the 1948–49 Serie A season, Silvio Piola has headed the list. Goran Pandev was the oldest player to reach the hundred goal milestone at the age of 37 years and 268 days.

The most recent player to score their hundredth goal in Serie A was Lautaro Martínez on 26 February 2024. Of the active players still in Serie A, Giovanni Simeone is closest to making the list with 84 goals.

== Serie A players with 100 or more goals ==
Key

- **Bold** shows players still playing in Serie A.
- Italics show players still playing professional football in other leagues.
- This list does not include goals scored during 1944 Campionato Alta Italia and the 1945–46 Serie A-B.

As of matches played 31 August 2026

Rank	Player	Goals	Apps	Ratio	First	Last	Club(s) (goals/apps)	Notes
1	(Italy) Silvio Piola	274	537	0.51	1929	1954	Pro Vercelli (51/127), Lazio (143/227), Juventus (10/28), Novara (70/155)	
2	(Italy) Francesco Totti	250	619	0.4	1992	2017	Roma	
3	(Sweden) Gunnar Nordahl	225	291	0.77	1949	1958	Milan (210/257), Roma (15/34)	
4	(Italy) Giuseppe Meazza	216	367	0.59	1929	1947	Internazionale (197/303), Milan (9/37), Juventus (10/27)	
4	(Brazil) (Italy) José Altafini	216	459	0.47	1958	1976	Milan (120/204), Napoli (71/179), Juventus (25/73)	
6	(Italy) Antonio Di Natale	209	445	0.47	2002	2016	Empoli (18/59), Udinese (191/385)	
7	(Italy) Roberto Baggio	205	452	0.45	1985	2004	Fiorentina (39/94), Juventus (78/141), Milan (12/51), Bologna (22/30), Internazionale (9/41), Brescia (45/95)	
8	(Italy) Ciro Immobile	201	359	0.56	2009	2026	Juventus (0/3), Genoa (5/33), Torino (27/47), Lazio (169/270), Bologna (0/6)	
9	(Sweden) Kurt Hamrin	190	400	0.48	1956	1971	Juventus (8/23), Padova (20/30), Fiorentina (150/289), Milan (9/36), Napoli (3/22)	
10	(Italy) Giuseppe Signori	188	344	0.55	1991	2004	Foggia (11/32), Lazio (107/152), Sampdoria (3/17), Bologna (67/143)	
10	(Italy) Alessandro Del Piero	188	478	0.39	1993	2012	Juventus	
10	(Italy) Alberto Gilardino	188	514	0.37	1999	2017	Piacenza (3/17), Hellas Verona (5/39), Parma (50/96), Milan (36/94), Fiorentina (52/132), Genoa (19/50), Bologna (13/36), Palermo (10/33), Empoli (0/14), Pescara (0/3)	
13	(Argentina) Gabriel Batistuta	183	318	0.58	1991	2003	Fiorentina (151/243), Roma (30/63), Internazionale (2/12)	
14	(Italy) Fabio Quagliarella	182	556	0.33	1999	2023	Sampdoria (102/277), Udinese (25/73), Juventus (23/84), Torino (18/55), Napoli (11/34), Ascoli (3/33)	
15	(Italy) Giampiero Boniperti	178	443	0.4	1946	1961	Juventus	
16	(Italy) Amedeo Amadei	174	423	0.41	1936	1956	Roma (85/182), Internazionale (42/70), Napoli (47/171)	
17	(Italy) Giuseppe Savoldi	168	405	0.41	1965	1980	Atalanta (17/57), Bologna (96/230), Napoli (55/115)	
18	(Italy) Guglielmo Gabetto	164	323	0.51	1934	1949	Juventus (84/165), Torino (80/158)	
19	(Italy) Roberto Boninsegna	162	363	0.45	1965	1979	Varese (5/28), Cagliari (23/83), Internazionale (112/195), Juventus (22/57)	
20	(Italy) Luca Toni	157	344	0.46	2000	2016	Vicenza (9/31), Brescia (15/44), Palermo (20/35), Fiorentina (55/94), Roma (5/15), Genoa (3/16), Juventus (2/14), Hellas Verona (48/95)	
21	(Sweden) Zlatan Ibrahimović	156	283	0.55	2004	2023	Juventus (23/70), Internazionale (57/88), Milan (76/125)	
21	(Italy) Gigi Riva	156	289	0.54	1964	1976	Cagliari	
21	(Italy) Filippo Inzaghi	156	370	0.42	1995	2012	Parma (2/15), Atalanta (24/33), Juventus (57/119), Milan (73/201)	
21	(Italy) Roberto Mancini	156	541	0.29	1981	2000	Bologna (9/30), Sampdoria (132/424), Lazio (15/87)	
25	(Brazil) Luís Vinício	155	347	0.45	1955	1968	Napoli (69/151), Bologna (17/47), Vicenza (68/141), Internazionale (1/8)	
25	(Italy) Carlo Reguzzoni	155	401	0.39	1929	1948	Pro Patria (14/42), Bologna (141/358)	
27	(Hungary) István Nyers	153	237	0.65	1948	1956	Internazionale (133/183), Roma (20/54)	
27	(Argentina) Hernán Crespo	153	340	0.45	1996	2012	Parma (72/162), Lazio (39/54), Internazionale (27/80), Milan (10/28), Genoa (5/16)	
29	(Italy) Adriano Bassetto	149	329	0.45	1946	1958	Sampdoria (92/196), Atalanta (56/125), Vicenza (1/8)	
30	(Argentina) (Italy) Omar Sívori	147	279	0.53	1957	1969	Juventus (125/216), Napoli (12/63)	
31	(Italy) Christian Vieri	142	264	0.54	1991	2009	Torino (1/7), Atalanta (11/35), Juventus (8/23), Lazio (12/22), Internazionale (100/142), Milan (1/8), Fiorentina (6/26)	
31	(Italy) Benito Lorenzi	142	330	0.43	1947	1959	Internazionale (138/305), Alessandria (4/25)	
31	(Italy) Marco Di Vaio	142	342	0.42	1994	2012	Lazio (3/8), Salernitana (12/31), Parma (41/83), Juventus (18/55), Genoa (3/22), Bologna (65/143)	
31	(Italy) Paolo Pulici	142	401	0.35	1967	1985	Torino (134/333), Udinese (5/26), Fiorentina (3/39)	
35	(Italy) Vincenzo Montella	141	288	0.49	1996	2009	Sampdoria (58/96), Roma (83/192)	
36	(Denmark) John Hansen	139	214	0.65	1948	1955	Juventus (124/187), Lazio (15/27)	
37	(Italy) Enrico Chiesa	138	380	0.36	1988	2008	Sampdoria (24/54), Cremonese (14/34), Parma (33/92), Fiorentina (33/57), Lazio (2/12), Siena (32/129)	
38	(Italy) Sergio Brighenti	136	311	0.44	1952	1965	Internazionale (20/40), Triestina (13/54), Padova (50/91), Sampdoria (43/95), Modena (10/30), Torino (0/1)	
39	(Italy) Roberto Pruzzo	133	331	0.4	1973	1989	Genoa (27/78), Roma (106/240), Fiorentina (0/13)	
40	(Argentina) **Lautaro Martínez**	132	269	0.49	2018	2026	**Internazionale**	
40	(Italy) Alessandro Altobelli	132	337	0.39	1977	1989	Internazionale (128/315), Juventus (4/20)	
42	(Italy) Felice Borel	131	257	0.51	1932	1947	Juventus (124/231), Torino (7/25), Alessandria (0/1)	
42	(Italy) **Domenico Berardi**	131	341	0.38	2013	2026	**Sassuolo**	
42	(Argentina) **Paulo Dybala**	131	372	0.35	2012	2026	Palermo (16/61), Juventus (82/210), **Roma** (33/101)	
45	(Italy) Ezio Pascutti	130	295	0.44	1955	1969	Bologna	
45	(Italy) Francesco Graziani	130	352	0.37	1973	1987	Torino (97/221), Fiorentina (14/52), Roma (12/57), Udinese (7/22)	
47	(Italy) Roberto Bettega	129	321	0.4	1970	1983	Juventus	
48	(Italy) Gianni Rivera	128	524	0.24	1958	1979	Alessandria (6/26), Milan (122/498)	
49	(Ukraine) Andriy Shevchenko	127	224	0.57	1999	2009	Milan	
49	(Colombia) **Duván Zapata**	127	355	0.36	2013	2026	Napoli (11/37), Udinese (18/63), Sampdoria (11/31), Atalanta (69/153), **Torino** (18/71)	
51	(Argentina) Gonzalo Higuaín	125	224	0.56	2013	2020	Napoli (71/104), Juventus (48/105), Milan (6/15)	
52	(Italy) Pietro Ferraris II	124	469	0.26	1929	1950	Pro Vercelli (20/86), Napoli (13/83), Internazionale (43/139), Torino (28/104), Novara (20/57)	
53	(France) David Trezeguet	123	214	0.57	2000	2010	Juventus	
53	(Italy) Gianluca Vialli	123	325	0.38	1984	1996	Sampdoria (85/223), Juventus (38/102)	
53	(Italy) Renzo Burini	123	329	0.37	1947	1959	Milan (88/190), Lazio (35/139)	
56	(Argentina) Mauro Icardi	121	219	0.55	2012	2019	Sampdoria (10/31), Internazionale (111/188)	
57	(Italy) Cristiano Lucarelli	120	301	0.4	1997	2012	Atalanta (5/26), Lecce (27/59), Torino (10/56), Livorno (73/132), Parma (4/16), Napoli (1/12)	
58	(Uruguay) (Italy) Ettore Puricelli	119	212	0.56	1938	1949	Bologna (80/133), Milan (39/79)	
59	(Italy) Gino Pivatelli	118	255	0.46	1953	1963	Bologna (104/197), Napoli (3/21), Milan (11/37)	
60	(Argentina) Abel Balbo	117	253	0.46	1989	2002	Udinese (32/60), Roma (78/149), Parma (4/25), Fiorentina (3/19)	
61	(Italy) Andrea Belotti	116	356	0.33	2014	2026	Palermo (6/38), Torino (100/232), Roma (3/45), Fiorentina (3/15), Como (2/18), Cagliari (2/8)	
61	(Italy) Alessandro Mazzola	116	415	0.28	1960	1977	Internazionale	
63	(Italy) Giampaolo Pazzini	114	382	0.3	2004	2020	Atalanta (3/12), Fiorentina (25/108), Sampdoria (36/75), Internazionale (15/49), Milan (21/74), Hellas Verona (14/64)	
64	(Belgium) Dries Mertens	113	295	0.38	2013	2022	Napoli	
64	(Italy) Nicola Amoruso	113	380	0.3	1993	2010	Sampdoria (3/8), Padova (14/33), Juventus (9/62), Perugia (11/32, Napoli (10/30), Como (6/14), Modena (5/25), Messina (5/22), Reggina (40/96), Torino (4/20), Siena (0/6), Parma (5/17), Atalanta (1/15),	
66	(Uruguay) Edinson Cavani	112	213	0.53	2007	2013	Palermo (34/109), Napoli (78/104)	
66	(Italy) Sergio Pellissier	112	459	0.24	2002	2019	Chievo	
68	(Italy) Riccardo Carapellese	111	315	0.35	1946	1957	Milan (52/106), Torino (28/98), Juventus (9/17), Genoa (22/94)	
68	(Italy) Antonio Cassano	113	400	0.28	1999	2017	Bari (6/48), Roma (39/118), Sampdoria (37/120), Milan (7/33), Internazionale (7/28), Parma (17/53)	
70	(Italy) Lorenzo Bettini	110	271	0.41	1952	1963	Palermo (8/20), Roma (9/15), Udinese (67/157), Lazio (15/42), Internazionale (9/24), Modena (2/13)	
70	(Italy) Carlo Galli	110	305	0.36	1949	1966	Palermo (16/45), Roma (40/94), Milan (47/112), Udinese (0/8), Genoa (3/8), Lazio (4/38)	
70	(Italy) Giovanni Ferrari	110	315	0.35	1929	1942	Alessandria (17/26), Juventus (68/166), Internazionale (23/108), Bologna (2/15)	
70	(Italy) Giuseppe Baldini	110	346	0.32	1939	1955	Fiorentina (8/51), Internazionale (6/25), Sampdoria (71/185), Genoa (6/31), Como (19/54)	
74	(Italy) Angelo Schiavio	109	179	0.61	1929	1938	Bologna	
74	(Italy) Bruno Giordano	109	317	0.34	1975	1992	Lazio (67/163), Napoli (23/78), Ascoli (12/43), Bologna (7/33)	
76	(Italy) Aldo Boffi	108	163	0.66	1936	1945	Milan	
76	(Italy) Eddie Firmani	108	194	0.56	1955	1963	Sampdoria (52/83), Internazionale (48/82), Genoa (8/29)	
78	(Bosnia and Herzegovina) Edin Džeko	107	279	0.38	2015	2025	Roma (85/199), Internazionale (22/69), Fiorentina (0/11)	
78	(Brazil) (Italy) Dino Da Costa	107	281	0.38	1955	1966	Roma (71/149), Fiorentina (7/30), Atalanta (18/51), Juventus (11/51)	
80	(Italy) Antonio Vojak	106	208	0.51	1929	1937	Napoli (102/190), Genoa (4/17), Lucchese (0/1)	
81	(Italy) Pietro Anastasi	105	339	0.31	1967	1981	Varese (11/29), Juventus (78/206), Internazionale (7/46), Ascoli (9/58)	
81	(Italy) Gino Armano	105	401	0.26	1946	1959	Alessandria (8/57), Internazionale (72/255), Torino (25/89)	
83	(Italy) Gino Cappello	104	300	0.35	1940	1956	Milan (29/74), Bologna (75/226)	
84	(Italy) Fabrizio Miccoli	103	259	0.4	2002	2013	Perugia (9/34), Juventus (8/25), Fiorentina (12/35), Palermo (74/165)	
84	(Romania) Adrian Mutu	103	271	0.38	1999	2012	Internazionale (0/10), Hellas Verona (16/57), Parma (18/31), Juventus (7/33), Fiorentina (54/112), Cesena (8/28)	
84	(Colombia) Luis Muriel	103	328	0.31	2010	2024	Udinese (15/57), Lecce (7/29), Sampdoria (21/79), Fiorentina (6/19), Atalanta (54/144)	
84	(Brazil) Sergio Clerici	103	335	0.31	1960	1978	Lecco (7/61), Bologna (19/75), Atalanta (9/26), Hellas Verona (18/54), Fiorentina (20/52), Napoli (29/56), Lazio (1/11)	
88	(Germany) Oliver Bierhoff	102	219	0.47	1991	2003	Ascoli (2/17), Udinese (57/86), Milan (36/90), Chievo (7/26)	
88	(Italy) Tommaso Rocchi	102	322	0.32	2002	2013	Empoli (17/66), Lazio (82/243), Internazionale (3/13)	
88	(Italy) Pietro Paolo Virdis	102	365	0.28	1974	1991	Cagliari (11/64), Juventus (17/75), Udinese (12/45), Milan (54/135), Lecce (8/46)	
91	(North Macedonia) Goran Pandev	101	492	0.21	2001	2022	Ancona (1/20), Lazio (48/159), Internazionale (5/45), Napoli (19/92), Genoa (28/176)	
92	(Italy) Pierino Prati	100	233	0.43	1966	1978	Milan (72/143), Roma (28/82), Fiorentina (0/8)	
92	(Slovakia) Marek Hamšík	100	409	0.24	2004	2019	Brescia (0/1), Napoli (100/408)	

== Most Serie A goals by club ==
Current Serie A clubs and players are shown in bold.

As of matches played 24 May 2026.

Rank	Club	Player	Goals	Apps	Ratio	First	Last
1	**Roma**	(Italy) Francesco Totti	250	619	0.4	1992	2017
2	**Milan**	(Sweden) Gunnar Nordahl	210	257	0.82	1949	1956
3	**Internazionale**	(Italy) Giuseppe Meazza	197	303	0.65	1929	1947
4	**Udinese**	(Italy) Antonio di Natale	191	385	0.5	2004	2016
5	**Juventus**	(Italy) Alessandro del Piero	188	478	0.39	1993	2012
6	**Lazio**	(Italy) Ciro Immobile	169	270	0.63	2016	2024
7	**Cagliari**	(Italy) Gigi Riva	156	289	0.54	1964	1976
8	**Fiorentina**	(Argentina) Gabriel Batistuta	151	243	0.62	1991	2000
9	**Bologna**	(Italy) Carlo Reguzzoni	141	358	0.39	1930	1946
10	**Torino**	(Italy) Paolo Pulici	134	333	0.4	1967	1982
11	Sampdoria	(Italy) Roberto Mancini	132	424	0.31	1982	1997
12	**Sassuolo**	(Italy) **Domenico Berardi**	130	340	0.38	2013	2026
13	**Napoli**	(Belgium) Dries Mertens	113	295	0.38	2013	2022
14	Chievo	(Italy) Sergio Pellissier	112	459	0.24	2002	2019
15	Palermo	(Italy) Fabrizio Miccoli	74	165	0.45	2007	2013
16	Livorno	(Italy) Cristiano Lucarelli	73	133	0.55	2004	2010
17	**Parma**	(Argentina) Hernán Crespo	72	162	0.44	1996	2012
18	Novara	(Italy) Silvio Piola	70	155	0.45	1948	1954
19	**Atalanta**	(Colombia) Duván Zapata	69	153	0.45	2018	2023
19	**Atalanta**	(Italy) Cristiano Doni	69	200	0.35	1998	2011
20	Vicenza	(Brazil) Luís Vinício	68	141	0.48	1962	1968
20	Alessandria	(Italy) Renato Cattaneo	68	181	0.38	1929	1935
22	Triestina	(Italy) Nereo Rocco	61	234	0.26	1930	1937
23	**Genoa**	(Czech Republic) Tomáš Skuhravý	57	155	0.37	1990	1996
24	Pro Vercelli	(Italy) Silvio Piola	51	127	0.4	1929	1934
25	Padova	(Italy) Sergio Brighenti	50	91	0.55	1957	1960
26	Hellas Verona	(Italy) Luca Toni	48	95	0.51	2013	2016
26	SPAL	(Argentina) Oscar Massei	48	209	0.23	1959	1968
28	Siena	(Italy) Massimo Maccarone	46	130	0.35	2005	2010
29	Brescia	(Italy) Roberto Baggio	45	95	0.47	2000	2004
29	**Venezia**	(Italy) Francesco Pernigo	45	135	0.33	1939	1947
31	Reggina	(Italy) Nicola Amoruso	40	96	0.42	2005	2008
32	Piacenza	(Italy) Dario Hübner	38	60	0.63	2001	2003
33	Catanzaro	(Italy) Massimo Palanca	37	105	0.35	1976	1981
34	Pro Patria	(Italy) Angelo Turconi	36	110	0.33	1947	1950
35	Catania	(Argentina) Gonzalo Bergessio	35	109	0.32	2011	2014
36	Lucchese	(Italy) Ugo Conti	34	59	0.58	1947	1949
37	**Lecce**	(Uruguay) Javier Chevantón	32	72	0.44	2001	2013
37	**Como**	(Italy) Vittorio Ghiandi	32	83	0.39	1949	1954
39	Bari	(Italy) Igor Protti	31	61	0.51	1992	1996
40	Crotone	(Nigeria) Simy	30	82	0.37	2016	2021
41	Mantova	(Italy) Angelo Sormani	29	64	0.45	1961	1963
42	Casale	(Italy) Mario Celoria	28	79	0.35	1931	1934
42	Cremonese	(Argentina) Gustavo Dezotti	28	92	0.3	1989	1994
42	Empoli	(Italy) Massimo Maccarone	28	99	0.28	2002	2017
45	Modena	(Italy) Francesco Pernigo	27	68	0.4	1947	1949
45	Modena	(Italy) Antonio Carnevali	27	77	0.35	1929	1939
46	Spezia	(Angola) M'Bala Nzola	26	77	0.34	2020	2023
47	Perugia	(Greece) Zisis Vryzas	25	107	0.23	2000	2004
Minimum 25 goals

== See also ==
- Capocannoniere
- Football records and statistics in Italy
