= Ștefan Radu =

Romanian footballer (born 1986)

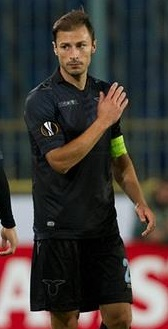
- Radu captaining Lazio in 2015

Personal information
- Full name: Ștefan Daniel Radu
- Date of birth: 22 October 1986 (age 40)
- Place of birth: Bucharest, Romania
- Height: 1.83 m (6 ft 0 in)
- Position: Defender

Youth career
- 1999–2004: Dinamo București

Senior career*
Years	Team	Apps	(Gls)
2004–2005	Dinamo II București	23	(1)
2005–2008	Dinamo București	61	(1)
2008	→ Lazio (loan)	11	(0)
2008–2023	Lazio	338	(5)
Total		433	(7)

International career
2003	Romania U17	1	(0)
2005	Romania U19	3	(0)
2006–2008	Romania U21	13	(1)
2006–2013	Romania	14	(0)
- * Club domestic league appearances and goals

Ștefan Daniel Radu (Romanian pronunciation: [ʃteˈfan daniˈel ˈradu]; born 22 October 1986) is a Romanian former professional footballer who played as a left-back or a centre-back and spent the majority of his professional career with Lazio.

After a stint in his home country with Dinamo București during which he earned three domestic honours, including one national title, Radu moved to Lazio on an initial loan in 2008. He spent the rest of his career with the Biancocelesti, gaining team captaincy and winning the Coppa Italia and the Supercoppa Italiana on three occasions each. Radu became the leading appearance maker for Lazio in all competitions in 2021, and two years later retired from football.

Radu registered his senior debut for the Romania national team in 2006, and made thirteen appearances before retiring early in 2013, at age 26.

== Club career ==
=== Dinamo București ===
Radu was born on 22 October 1986 in Bucharest, Romania and grew up in the Colentina neighborhood. On 27 April 2005, Radu made his Liga I debut for Dinamo București under coach Ioan Andone in a 3–0 victory over FCM Bacău. Coach Mircea Rednic established him in Dinamo's starting XI during the 2006–07 Liga I season, partly due to a defender emergency. Radu and Cosmin Moți formed a central defensive partnership, ultimately securing the Liga I trophy that year. They also managed to get past the group stage of the 2006–07 UEFA Cup, reaching the round of 32 where the team was eliminated with 3–1 on aggregate by Benfica. In the following season, Dinamo had the objective of reaching the Champions League group stage. In the 1–1 draw in the first leg of the third qualifying round against Lazio Roma, Radu handballed in the penalty box after a corner kick, but goalkeeper Bogdan Lobonț saved the penalty kick executed by Tommaso Rocchi. However, the qualification was lost after the 3–1 defeat in the second leg.

=== Lazio ===
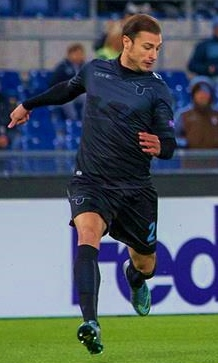
Radu in action for Lazio in 2015

In January 2008, Italian Serie A side Lazio signed Radu on a €1 million loan deal until the end of the 2007–08 season. Shortly after joining the squad, he made his Lazio debut in a Coppa Italia match against Fiorentina. He was a revelation for Delio Rossi's team, as the young starlet added extra quality to the backline and started all the matches he featured in. At the end of the season, Radu signed with Lazio permanently for a €3.5 million transfer fee.

On 17 June 2011, Radu signed a five-year contract extension. He became an important player for Lazio, a team which he captained during the 2011–12 season. Radu won his third trophy with Lazio in the 2012–13 season when they defeated rivals Roma in the Coppa Italia final. In 2017, Lazio won the Supercoppa Italiana, as they beat Juventus 3–2. On 15 May 2019, Lazio beat Atalanta in the 2018–19 Coppa Italia final. On 22 December 2019, Lazio beat Juventus in the 2019 Supercoppa Italiana, with help from Radu. He retired at the end of the 2022–23 season.

He is the player with more appearances than any other in the history of the club: 427 (349 in Serie A, 25 in Coppa Italia, 3 in Champions League, 46 in Europa League and four Super Coppa Finals) with 8 goals (5 in Serie A, 2 in Coppa Italia and one in Europa League) and six trophies (Coppa Italia 2008-09, 2012–13 and 2018–19, Super Coppa 2009, 2017 and 2019).

== International career ==
Radu played 13 games for Romania, making his debut on 15 November 2006 under coach Victor Pițurcă who sent him in the 89th minute to replace Răzvan Raț in a 1–0 friendly victory against Spain. He played two matches in successful Euro 2008 qualifiers. Coach Pițurcă selected him to be part of the squad that went to the final tournament, but he did not play there. He played one game during the 2010 World Cup qualifiers, a 3–0 home loss to Lithuania. Radu made his last appearance for the national team on 22 March 2013 in a 2–2 draw against rivals Hungary in the 2014 World Cup qualifiers. He retired from international football in April 2013, citing his strained relationship with the national football federation.

On 25 March 2008, he was decorated by President of Romania Traian Băsescu for Romania's successful Euro 2008 qualifying campaign with the Medalia "Meritul Sportiv" – (The Medal "The Sportive Merit") class III.

== Controversies ==
On 6 April 2024, during a football match between Roma and Lazio, Radu was spotted in attendance wearing an S.S. Lazio emblazoned hoodie where the "S.S." was spelled "SS" and stylized in the same manner as the Nazi paramilitary organization Schutzstaffel. It was placed within the context of far-right extremism in football, which has attracted more attention in the 2020s.

== Career statistics ==
=== Club ===
Appearances and goals by club, season and competition
Club	Season	League			National Cup (Note: Includes Cupa României, Coppa Italia)		Europe		Other		Total	
Club	Season	Division	Apps	Goals	Apps	Goals	Apps	Goals	Apps	Goals	Apps	Goals
Dinamo II București	2004–05	Divizia B	12	1	1	0	—		—		13	1
Dinamo II București	2005–06	Divizia B	11	0	—		—		—		11	0
Dinamo II București	Total		23	1	1	0	—		—		24	1
Dinamo București	2004–05	Divizia A	2	0	0	0	—		—		2	0
Dinamo București	2005–06	Divizia A	8	0	0	0	0	0	0	0	8	0
Dinamo București	2006–07	Liga I	32	1	2	0	12 (Note: Appearances in UEFA Cup)	1	—		46	2
Dinamo București	2007–08	Liga I	19	0	0	0	4 (Note: Two appearances in UEFA Champions League, two appearances in UEFA Cup)	0	1 (Note: Appearance in Supercupa României)	0	24	0
Dinamo București	Total		61	1	2	0	16	1	1	0	80	2
Lazio (loan)	2007–08	Serie A	11	0	2	0	—		—		13	0
Lazio	2008–09	Serie A	19	0	0	0	—		—		19	0
Lazio	2009–10	Serie A	28	0	2	0	6 (Note: Appearances in UEFA Europa League)	0	0	0	36	0
Lazio	2010–11	Serie A	26	0	1	0	—		—		27	0
Lazio	2011–12	Serie A	21	0	0	0	5	0	—		26	0
Lazio	2012–13	Serie A	23	1	4	1	9	1	—		36	3
Lazio	2013–14	Serie A	25	1	1	0	5	0	1 (Note: Appearances in Supercoppa Italiana)	0	32	1
Lazio	2014–15	Serie A	24	0	5	1	—		—		29	1
Lazio	2015–16	Serie A	13	0	2	0	9 (Note: One appearance in UEFA Champions League, eight appearances in UEFA Europa League)	0	1	0	25	0
Lazio	2016–17	Serie A	29	2	2	0	—		—		31	2
Lazio	2017–18	Serie A	31	0	3	0	6	0	1	0	41	0
Lazio	2018–19	Serie A	28	0	2	0	3	0	—		33	0
Lazio	2019–20	Serie A	29	1	1	0	0	0	1	0	31	1
Lazio	2020–21	Serie A	31	0	0	0	2 (Note: Appearances in UEFA Champions League)	0	—		33	0
Lazio	2021–22	Serie A	10	0	0	0	2	0	—		12	0
Lazio	2022–23	Serie A	1	0	0	0	2	0	—		3	0
Lazio	Total		349	5	25	2	49	1	4	0	427	8
Career total			433	7	28	2	65	2	5	0	531	11

=== International ===
Appearances and goals by national team and year
National team	Year	Apps	Goals
Romania	2006	1	0
Romania	2007	5	0
Romania	2008	3	0
Romania	2009	0	0
Romania	2010	0	0
Romania	2011	2	0
Romania	2012	1	0
Romania	2013	2	0
Total		14	0

== Honours ==
Dinamo București

- Liga I: 2006–07
- Cupa României: 2004–05
- Supercupa României: 2005

Lazio

- Coppa Italia: 2008–09, 2012–13, 2018–19
- Supercoppa Italiana: 2009, 2017, 2019

Records

- Lazio all-time appearance holder: 427
- Lazio all-time Serie A appearance holder: 349
