= Ciro Immobile =

Italian former professional footballer (born 1990)

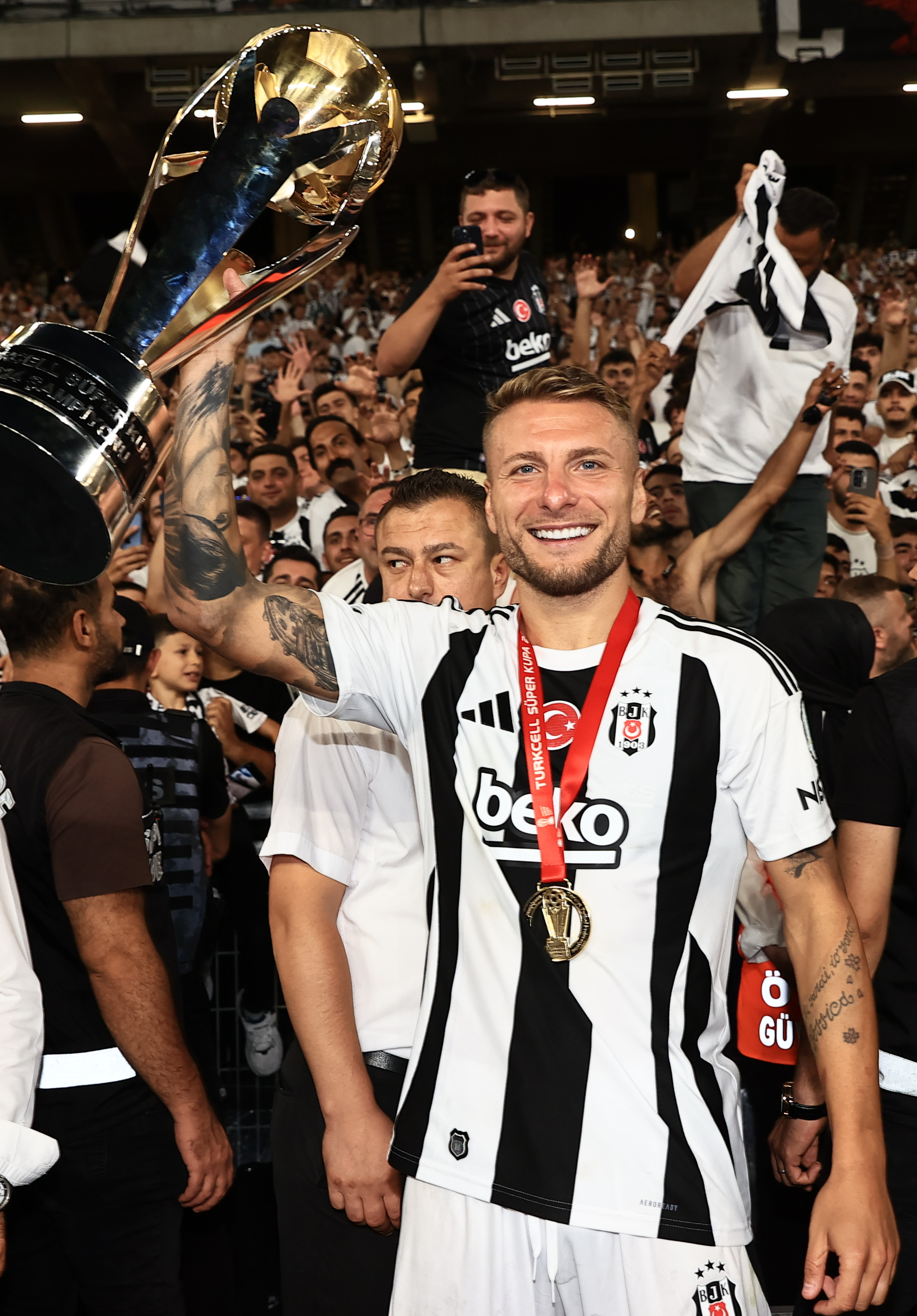
- Immobile lifting the Turkish Super Cup with Beşiktaş in 2024

Personal information
- Full name: Ciro Immobile
- Date of birth: 20 February 1990 (age 36)
- Place of birth: Torre Annunziata, Italy
- Height: 1.85 m (6 ft 1 in)
- Position: Striker

Youth career
- 1996–2001: Torre Annunziata '88
- 2001–2002: Maria Rosa Salerno
- 2002–2005: Salernitana
- 2005–2007: Sorrento
- 2007–2010: Juventus

Senior career*
Years	Team	Apps	(Gls)
2007	Sorrento	0	(0)
2009–2012	Juventus	3	(0)
2010–2011	→ Siena (loan)	4	(2)
2011	→ Grosseto (loan)	16	(1)
2011–2012	→ Pescara (loan)	37	(28)
2012–2013	Genoa	33	(5)
2013–2014	Torino	33	(22)
2014–2016	Borussia Dortmund	24	(3)
2015–2016	→ Sevilla (loan)	8	(2)
2016	Sevilla	0	(0)
2016	→ Torino (loan)	14	(5)
2016–2024	Lazio	270	(169)
2024–2025	Beşiktaş	30	(15)
2025–2026	Bologna	6	(0)
2026	Paris FC	12	(2)
Total		490	(253)

International career
2009–2010	Italy U20	6	(0)
2009–2013	Italy U21	16	(9)
2014–2023	Italy	57	(17)
Medal record
Representing Italy
UEFA European Championship
Winner	2020 Europe
UEFA Nations League
Third place	2023 Netherlands
UEFA European Under-21 Championship
Runner-up	2013 Israel
Mediterranean Games
Runner-up	2009 Italy
- * Club domestic league appearances and goals

Ciro Immobile Cavaliere OMRI (born 20 February 1990) is an Italian former professional footballer who played as a striker. He is widely regarded as one of the most prolific and clinical goalscorers of his generation.

Immobile began his career at Sorrento. In 2009, he was purchased by Juventus, and was later loaned out to three Serie B clubs, including Pescara, with whom he won the league title as the top scorer, before moving to Genoa in 2012. After a season with the club, he moved to Juventus' rivals Torino, where he won the Capocannoniere award for the top scorer in Serie A. After his breakout season at Torino, he was sold to German club Borussia Dortmund for around €18 million in 2014, where they won the DFL-Supercup, before moving to Spanish club Sevilla in 2015. In 2016, he returned to Torino on loan, and was later sold to Lazio in July of that year. He later joined Turkish side Beşiktaş in 2024, before returning to Italy to play for Bologna, and eventually joining Paris FC in 2026 and later retiring.

At Lazio, Immobile won a Coppa Italia and two Supercoppa Italiana titles, and is currently the club's all-time highest goalscorer. In his second season at Lazio, he won the Capocannoniere for a second time, with 29 goals in 33 games. The 2019–20 season was the most prolific of Immobile's career; he equalled the record for most Serie A goals in a season with 36, and won a third Capocannoniere title and first European Golden Shoe, given to the top scorer in Europe. In 2022, he won the Capocannoniere for a fourth time, with 27 goals in 31 games. Overall, Immobile managed to score 120 goals at the Stadio Olimpico – more than any other player at a single stadium used in Italy's top flight. He currently sits eighth in the all-time list of Serie A top scorers.

A former senior international with 57 caps, Immobile made his debut for the Italy national team in March 2014, and was included in the squad for the 2014 FIFA World Cup and two UEFA European Championships (2016 and 2020), winning the latter tournament.

== Club career ==
=== Sorrento and Juventus ===
Born in Torre Annunziata, in the province of Naples, Immobile began his youth career in the football school "Torre Annunziata '88", before transferring to "Maria Rosa" and finally the youth team of Salernitana, where however, he failed to emerge. He later joined Sorrento, with whom he scored 30 goals in the under-17 during the 2007–08 season, including a brace against Torino, impressing the observers of Juventus.

In 2008, he was signed at the age of 18 for €80,000 (equivalent to €107,843 in 2023) by Juventus under the recommendation of Ciro Ferrara. He went on to play with the Primavera formation.

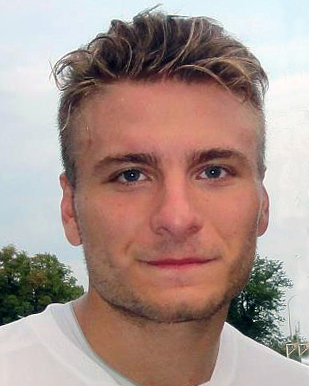
Immobile with Juventus in August 2011

Immobile joined the Primavera squad in 2009, where he formed a striking partnership with Ayub Daud, that led the squad to win the 2009 Torneo di Viareggio, where he scored a total five goals; two of which came in the final.

On 14 March 2009, Immobile made his Serie A debut in a 4–1 home win against Bologna, replacing Juventus' captain Alessandro Del Piero in the 89th minute. On 25 November 2009, Immobile also made his debut in a European competition, once again as a second-half substitute for Del Piero in a Champions League game against Bordeaux. In February 2010, he scored a hat-trick against Empoli in the 2010 Torneo di Viareggio final to seal the title for a second consecutive season.

==== Loans to Siena and Grosseto ====
On 1 July 2010, Immobile, along with teammate Luca Marrone, were sent on loan to recently relegated Serie B side A.C. Siena. In exchange for the two loans, Juventus acquired Niccolò Giannetti, Leonardo Spinazzola, and Austrian midfielder Marcel Büchel on loan from the Tuscan club. Immobile never broke into the first team, however, and in January 2011, he left Siena, after just 4 appearances and 1 goal. Following his departure from Siena, he was immediately loaned by Juventus to Grosseto, another Serie B club for the remainder of the 2010–11 Serie B season.

==== Loan to Pescara ====
On 17 August 2011, it was announced that Immobile would join Serie B club Pescara on a season-long loan from Juventus. He scored his first goal for the club on 26 August during his debut for Pescara in the first league match against Hellas Verona. By the end of the 2011–12 Serie B andata (first half of the season), Immobile had already scored 14 league goals. On 30 January 2012, Genoa confirmed that they had paid €4 million for half of the player's rights from Juventus, following his mercurial form in Serie B. He completed his season with Pescara in the Italian second division, as the club won the league title and sealed promotion to Serie A. He also went on to become the Serie B season's top scorer with a total of 28 goals, seven more than the second-highest scorer, Juve Stabia's Marco Sau. Immobile was also named Serie B's Player of the Year at the 2012 AIC Gran Gala del Calcio, alongside teammates Lorenzo Insigne and Marco Verratti.

=== Genoa ===
Immobile formally became a Genoa player on 1 July 2012 after the loan with Pescara expired. On 19 June 2013, Genoa and Juventus again renewed the co-ownership agreements of Immobile and Richmond Boakye.

=== Torino ===
On 12 July 2013 Juventus bought Genoa's half of Immobile for €2.75 million. On the same day he was sold to city-rivals Torino under a new co-ownership deal for €2.75 million.

He made his debut for Torino during the first round of the Coppa Italia against former club Pescara, scoring his first goal of the season. He provided an assist in his Serie A debut for the club, but did not score until 7 October in a 2–2 draw against Sampdoria. Previously, Immobile had failed to score in Serie A since December 2012. The goal signalled a run of form for Immobile, with the player scoring a further 12 goals in his next 15 matches, including his first brace in Serie A during a game against Chievo Verona in December.

On 22 March 2014, Immobile scored his first Serie A hat-trick, in a 3–1 win against Livorno. Three days later, he scored a spectacular volley with his left foot against Roma, temporarily bringing the Granata level at the Stadio Olimpico. On 6 April, he scored the winning goal against Catania in a 2–1 victory.

On 13 April, Genoa were leading 1–0, when Immobile and Alessio Cerci both scored in stoppage time to give Torino a 2–1 win. He scored again in the following round in a 3–3 draw away to Lazio. On 27 April, Immobile scored for the sixth consecutive match in a 2–0 defeat of Udinese. This took him to 21 goals in the season, equaling the seasonal goal records of Paolo Pulici and Francesco Graziani at Torino.

On 11 May, Immobile scored in the penultimate fixture of the season against Parma, but was sent off in the second half and suspended for the final match against Fiorentina. He concluded his season with 22 goals in 33 appearances, plus one goal in the Coppa Italia. He became the first Torino player to win the Capocannoniere since Francesco Graziani in the 1976–77 season.

=== Borussia Dortmund ===
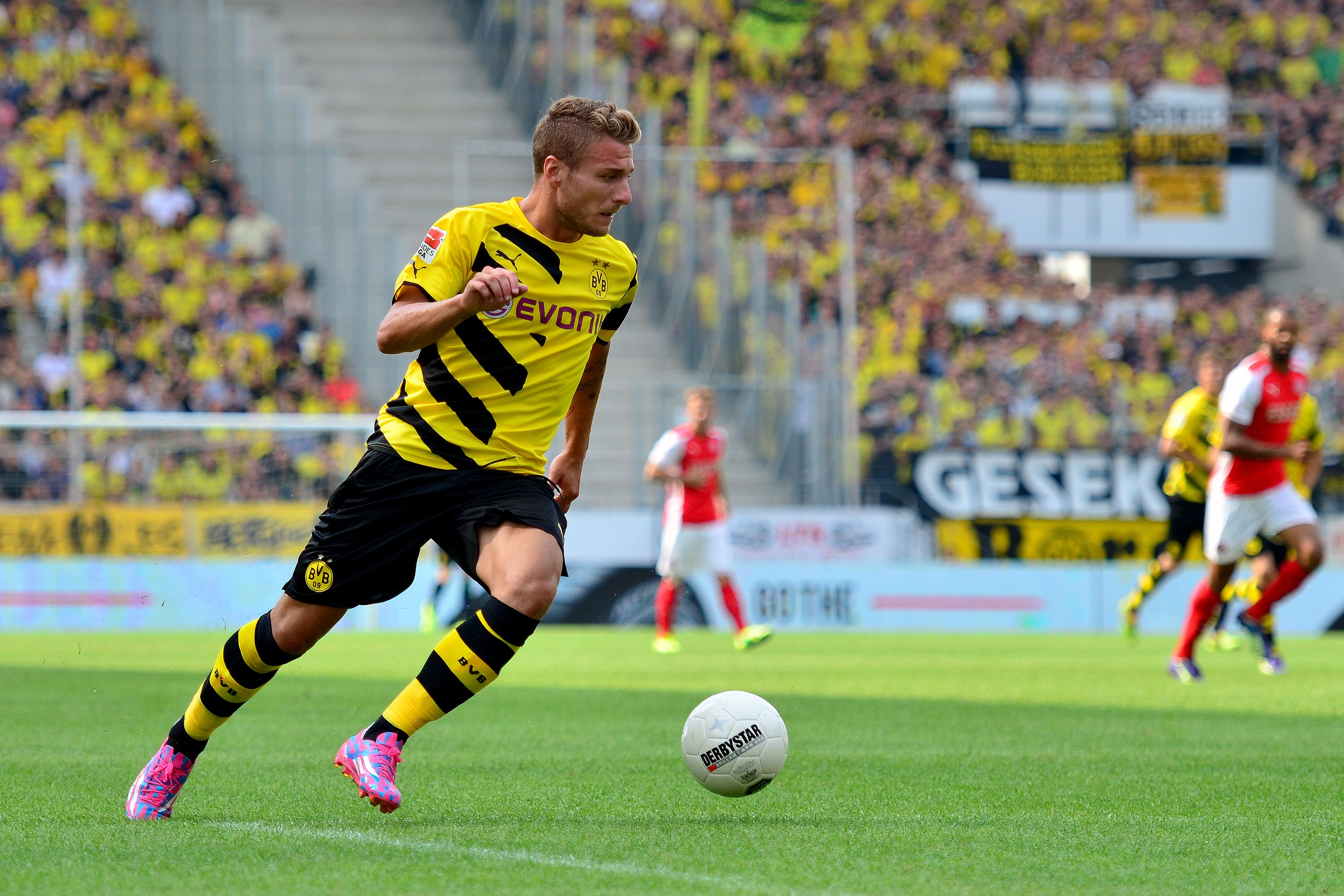
Immobile playing for Borussia Dortmund in July 2014

On 2 June 2014, Bundesliga club Borussia Dortmund announced the signing of Immobile, despite the co-ownership agreement between Torino and Juventus not being resolved. Urbano Cairo, the president of Torino, accused Juventus and Dortmund of violating FIFA regulation regarding transfer on 10 May 2014, which FIGC also states that such transfers must have mutual consent of the co-owners. Cairo also wanted to keep Immobile for at least a season for sports and for profit. On 18 June 2014, Juventus sold the remaining 50% registration rights of Immobile to Torino for €8.035 million. Torino later revealed in its financial filing, that the transfer fee to the German side was €17.955 million. On 13 August, Immobile made his Dortmund debut, starting in the 2014 DFL-Supercup against Bayern Munich, with Dortmund winning 2–0.

Immobile made his Bundesliga debut on 23 August in the opening match of Dortmund's 2014–15 Bundesliga campaign which saw them lose 2–0 to Bayer Leverkusen at home. On 16 September, Immobile scored his first goal for the club, opening a 2–0 home win over Arsenal in the group stages of the Champions League. He scored four goals in six Champions League matches, in a 3–0 away win over Anderlecht, in a 4–1 home win over Galatasaray and in a 1–1 home draw vs Anderlecht, with Borussia qualifying as first from the group. On 17 December 2014, Immobile assisted the first goal and scored the second on a 2–2 home draw with Wolfsburg.

=== Sevilla ===
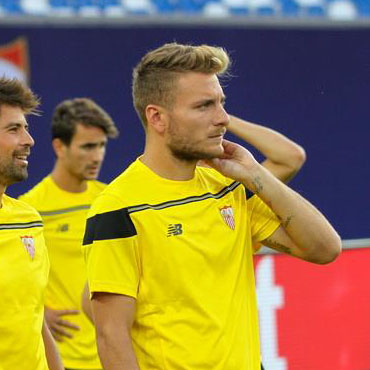
Immobile with Sevilla in August 2015, prior to the UEFA Super Cup

On 12 July 2015, Immobile joined Sevilla on a season-long loan after scoring just three goals in the league in his first season at Borussia Dortmund, with a total 10 goals in 34 matches across all competitions. Sevilla also had an option to sign him outright. He made his debut for the club on 11 August 2015, coming off the bench to replace Kevin Gameiro in the 80th minute of the 2015 UEFA Super Cup final, against Barcelona, and assisting Yevhen Konoplyanka's temporary equaliser to send the match into extra-time; Barcelona went on to win the match 5–4.

On 31 July 2015, Immobile was stretchered off the pitch wearing an oxygen mask and a neck brace after playing just five minutes in a friendly against Watford at Vicarage Road after clashing heads with an opponent. He was taken to the hospital for tests and was in recovering condition. It was later determined his nasal septum ruptured, which looked like a major injury, but turned out to be only minor. On 8 November 2015, Immobile scored his first goal for Sevilla in the 36th minute as they emerged victorious in a 3–2 La Liga home win over Real Madrid. In November, the obligation to buy clause was exercised when Immobile made his fifth appearance, buying him outright for €11 million plus the €3 million for the loan spell.

==== Loan to Torino ====
On 14 January 2016, Immobile returned to Torino on loan until the end of 2015–16 season. Two days later on his return debut, he scored the opening goal of a 4–2 home victory over Frosinone. On 14 February, he scored a brace, in a 3–1 win away against Palermo. On 22 March, it was determined he sustained a muscular injury at the half time mark in a derby with Juventus two days prior, and would be sidelined for a month.

=== Lazio ===
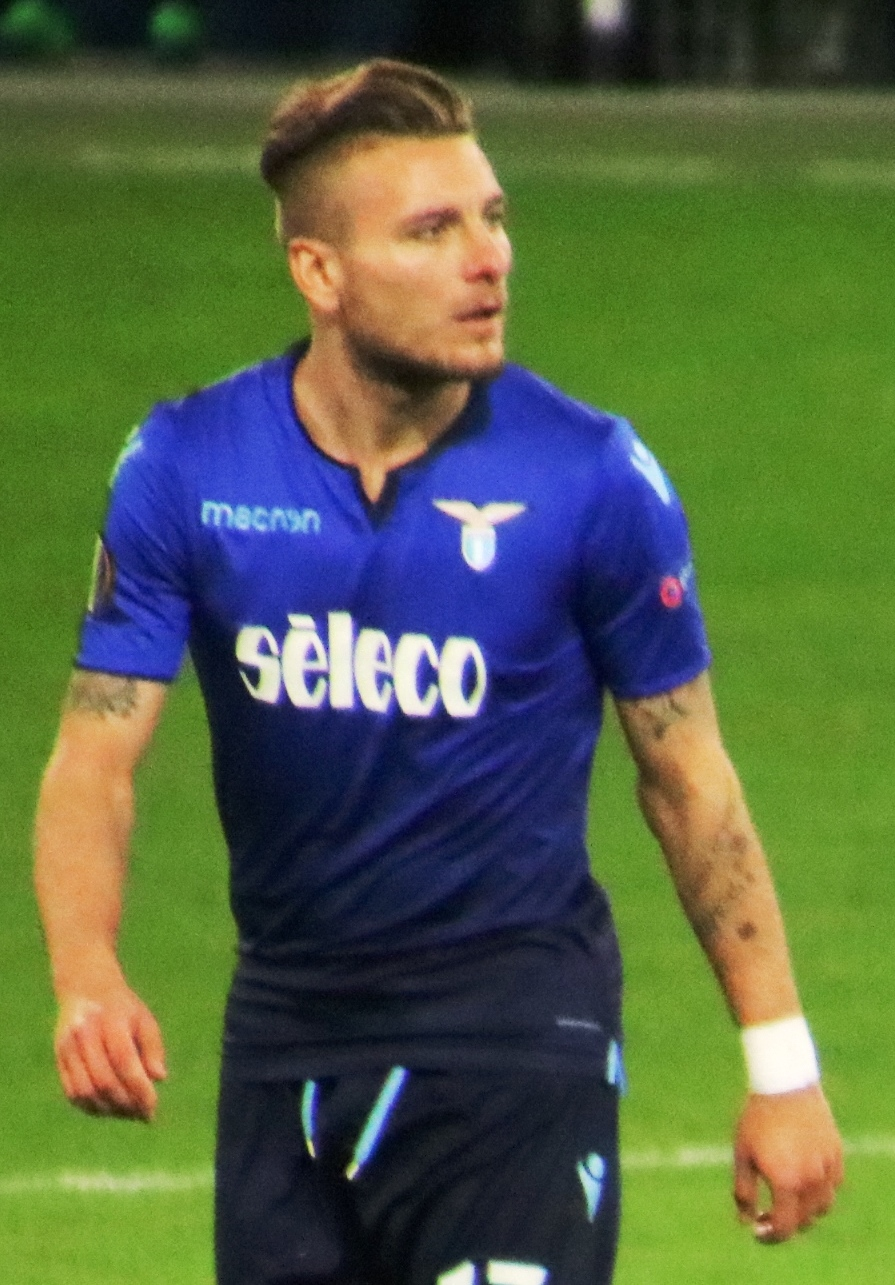
Immobile with Lazio in 2018

On 27 July 2016, Immobile signed with Lazio for a fee of €8.75 million (plus €700,000 commission to agents). On 21 August, Immobile scored on his debut in Lazio's opening match of a 4–3 away win over Atalanta. Immobile finished the season with 23 league goals in 36 appearances plus 3 goals in the Coppa Italia, surpassing his total when he won the Capocannoniere with Torino in the 2013–14 season, though this time he did not win the Capocannoniere, losing it to Bosnian striker Edin Džeko of cross-town rivals Roma, who scored 29 league goals.

On 13 August 2017, Immobile scored the opening two goals of the Supercoppa Italiana; Lazio won with a final score of 3–2 over Juventus. On 10 September, in Lazio's third match of the season, he scored a hat-trick and got an assist in a 4–1 home win over Milan. On 21 October, Immobile extended with Lazio until 2022. On 6 January 2018, Immobile scored four goals in the first half away to SPAL, the first Lazio player to score multiple hat-tricks in a season in 16 years; Lazio eventually won the match 5–2. On 22 February 2018, Immobile scored a hat-trick in the Europa League round of 32 second leg home to Steaua București in a 5–1 win, which allowed Lazio to qualify, 5–2 on aggregate, to the round of 16. On 31 March 2018, Immobile scored twice in Lazio's 6–2 home win over Benevento, his 36th goal of the season, breaking Giorgio Chinaglia's previous record for most goals scored by a Lazio player in a single season, by two goals. Immobile ended the season with 29 goals in 33 appearances, winning the Capocannoniere jointly with Inter's Mauro Icardi. Immobile also ended the 2017–2018 season as UEFA Europa League's top scorer with 8 goals, jointly with Aritz Aduriz.

On 3 November 2019, he scored his 100th goal for Lazio in a 2–1 away win over Milan. On 26 July 2020, Immobile scored a hat-trick in a 5–1 win against Hellas Verona. Immobile finished the season with 36 goals, winning the Capocannoniere and equaling Gonzalo Higuaín's all-time record for most goals in a Serie A season. He also won the European Golden Shoe for the first time in his career, becoming the first Italian player or player from Serie A to win the award since Francesco Totti in 2007. Moreover, he set a new record for most penalties scored in a single Serie A season, with 14.

On 31 August 2020, Immobile signed a five-year contract extension with Lazio. On 20 October 2020, he scored his first Champions League goal for Lazio in a 3–1 win over his former club Borussia Dortmund in the 2020–21 season. On 12 May 2021, Immobile scored the only goal of a 1–0 home win over Parma in Serie A; this was his 150th goal for Lazio across all competitions.

On 30 October 2021, the Italian striker netted his 159th career goal for the Biancocelesti in a 2–1 win victory over Atalanta, drawing level with Silvio Piola's all-time club goal record. On 4 November, Immobile scored against Marseille in the UEFA Europa League to become Lazio's all-time leading goalscorer, surpassing Silvio Piola, with 160. With this goal, the Italian striker also became the club's all-time top scorer in the Europa League (11); he surpassed former striker Pierluigi Casiraghi, who had scored 10 times in the competition for Lazio. On 7 November, with a goal against Salernitana in a 3–0 victory, Immobile became the first Lazio player to score 10+ goals in six consecutive Serie A seasons. On 6 January 2022, by scoring a goal in a 3–3 draw against Empoli, Immobile became just the fourth player in Serie A history to score 15 goals in the league in seven separate seasons. On 5 March, he made his 200th appearance for Lazio in Serie A, in which he scored a penalty against Cagliari in a 3–0 away victory. In addition, with his goal against the Rossoblu, he matched Silvio Piola's goal record with Lazio in Serie A (143) and became the third player to ever score 20 or more Serie A goals in six different seasons. On 16 April, he scored in the stoppage time in a 1–1 draw against Torino, which was his 180th Serie A goal, matching Sampdoria veteran Fabio Quagliarella at 13th in the league's all-time top scorers list. In addition, he became the first Italian player in Serie A history to score at least 25 goals in three separate league campaigns and reached 30+ goals in all competitions for a third time in his career. On 24 April, by scoring in a 2–1 defeat against Milan, Immobile became just the fourth player in Europe's top five leagues to score more than 25 goals in a league season at least three times since the 2016–17 season, joining Robert Lewandowski, Lionel Messi, and Cristiano Ronaldo.

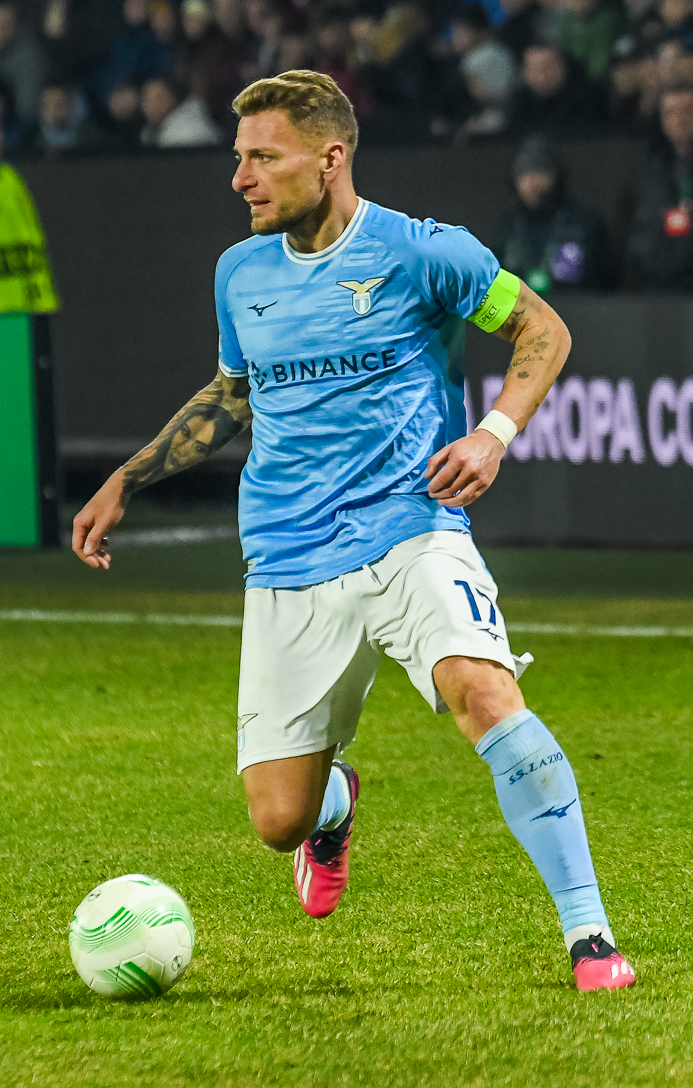
Immobile playing for Lazio in 2023

On 19 February 2023, Immobile scored two goals against Salernitana in a 2–0 away win, reaching at 8th in the league's all-time goalscorers, surpassing Kurt Hamrin. On 14 April, he netted a penalty in a 3–0 away win over Spezia, to become the third player to score 10 goals in seven consecutive seasons with the same club, after Francesco Totti and Antonio Di Natale.

On 7 November 2023, Immobile scored his 200th Lazio goal in a 1–0 home win against Feyenoord in the 2023–24 UEFA Champions League. On 10 February 2024, Immobile scored his 200th goal in Serie A in a 3–1 away win over Cagliari. Four days later, he converted a penalty in a 1–0 win over Bayern Munich in the Champions League round of 16 first leg, to be his first ever goal in the knockout phase of the competition, in addition to securing Lazio's first ever win against that opponent, and their first victory in the knockout stages since the 1999–2000 season. However, he eventually managed to score only eleven goals in all competitions, including seven Serie A goals in the 2023–24 season.

=== Beşiktaş ===
On 13 July 2024, Immobile and Süper Lig club Beşiktaş agreed on contract terms. He signed a contract to stay with the club until June 2026. A month later, on 3 August, he scored a brace and was named player of the match in a 5–0 victory over Galatasaray in the Turkish Super Cup. On 18 August 2024, on the second matchday of the Süper Lig, he scored a brace against Antalyaspor, securing a 4–2 victory for Beşiktaş. Immobile scored 10 goals in his first 10 games for Beşiktaş and is the first player since the 2007–08 season to score five goals in the first six matches of the league.

=== Bologna ===
On 10 July 2025, Immobile signed with Serie A club Bologna.

=== Paris FC and retirement ===
On 1 February 2026, Immobile joined Paris FC in French Ligue 1 until the end of the 2025–26 season, with an option for the 2026–27 season. A month later, on 22 March, he scored his first goal for the club in a 10-0 lost against Le Havre.

On 14 August, Immobile announced his retirement from professional football.

== International career ==
=== Early senior career ===
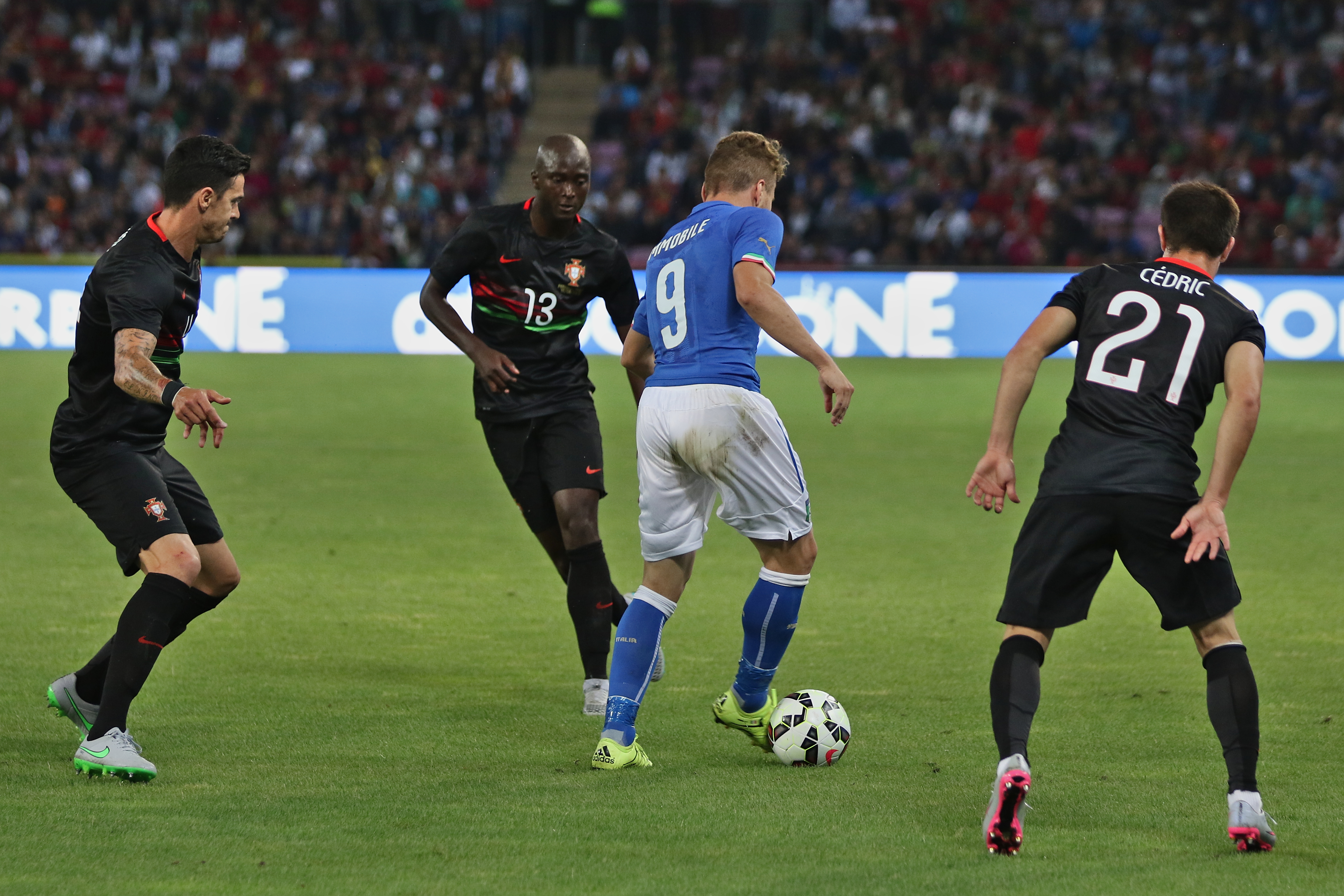
Immobile taking on the Portugal defence in a June 2015 friendly in Geneva, Switzerland

On 2 March 2014, Immobile received his first call-up to the senior national team by Cesare Prandelli, for a friendly match against Spain three days later. He debuted as a substitute for Alessio Cerci after 69 minutes as Spain eventually won 1–0.

On 13 May 2014, Immobile was named in Italy's provisional 30-man squad for the 2014 FIFA World Cup, and on 1 June he was named in the final 23-man squad. On 8 June, he scored a hat-trick in Italy's final World Cup warm-up match, a 5–3 unofficial win over Brazilian club side Fluminense. Immobile made his competitive debut in Italy's opening 2–1 victory over England in Manaus on 14 June, playing the last 17 minutes in place of Mario Balotelli who scored the Italian winner. He scored his first official international goal in the third minute of a 2–0 friendly victory against the Netherlands on 4 September 2014.

On 31 May 2016, Immobile was named to Antonio Conte's 23-man Italy squad for UEFA Euro 2016. He only played in the group stage, coming off the bench vs Belgium and starting against the Republic of Ireland as Italy would go onto lose to Germany in the quarterfinals.

=== Later career ===
In June 2021, Immobile was included in Italy's squad for UEFA Euro 2020 by manager Roberto Mancini. In the opening match of the tournament on 11 June, he scored Italy's second goal and assisted Insigne for his team's final goal in a 3–0 win over Turkey. In the following group match on 16 June, Immobile scored Italy's third goal in a 3–0 victory over Switzerland. In the semi-final against Spain on 6 July, he assisted the opening goal scored in the second half by Federico Chiesa of a 1–1 draw, before being substituted by Domenico Berardi; after extra-time, Italy advanced to the final of the tournament following a 4–2 penalty shoot-out victory. On 11 July, Immobile won the European Championship with Italy following a 3–2 penalty shoot-out victory over England at Wembley Stadium in the final, after a 1–1 draw in extra-time; Immobile started the match, but was once again replaced by Berardi during the second half of regulation time.

In September 2023, new manager Luciano Spalletti announced Immobile as the new captain of Italy, replacing Leonardo Bonucci. However, in May 2024, he was excluded from the squad for the UEFA Euro 2024.

== After retirement ==
On 10 September 2026, he was chosen as Italy U16's Head of Delegation by FIGC.

== Style of play ==
Although primarily a main striker, Immobile was capable of playing anywhere along the front-line. A quick forward, Immobile was primarily known for his offensive movement off the ball, as well as his ability to make attacking runs and exploit spaces. He would often drift wide, from a central position, when making forward runs, allowing him to ghost in behind the defensive line where he could cut in to shoot, usually into the far post. His main characteristics were his eye for goal and finishing ability with either foot, as well as his physical attributes; he also possessed solid technique, and was effective in the air.

In addition to his offensive capabilities and goalscoring ability, Immobile was also a hard-working player, known for his willingness to chase down the ball and press opponents when not in possession; he also possessed good link-up play, which enabled him to provide assists for teammates, in addition to scoring goals himself. He was also an accurate penalty taker. One of the most prolific strikers of his generation, his goalscoring record and efficiency earned him the nickname "King Ciro" with the Lazio supporters.

== Personal life ==
In May 2014, Immobile and his long-time girlfriend Jessica Melena married. They have four children. Immobile is a big fan of Formula One and participated in the third stage of the "Race For The World" broadcast on Sky and organized by Charles Leclerc to raise funds for the fight against COVID-19.

On 16 April 2023, Immobile, accompanied by his two daughters, suffered a spinal cord sprain and a fractured rib following a collision of his car with a tram near Stadio Olimpico in Rome.

== Career statistics ==
=== Club ===
Appearances and goals by club, season and competition
Club	Season	League			National cup (Note: Includes Coppa Italia, DFB-Pokal, Copa del Rey, Turkish Cup, Coupe de France)		Europe		Other		Total	
Club	Season	Division	Apps	Goals	Apps	Goals	Apps	Goals	Apps	Goals	Apps	Goals
Sorrento	2006–07	Serie C2	0	0	—		—		1 (Note: Appearance in Supercoppa C2)	0	1	0
Juventus	2008–09	Serie A	1	0	0	0	0	0	—		1	0
Juventus	2009–10	Serie A	2	0	1	0	1 (Note: Appearance(s) in UEFA Champions League)	0	—		4	0
Juventus	Total		3	0	1	0	1	0	0	0	5	0
Siena (loan)	2010–11	Serie B	4	1	2	1	—		—		6	2
Grosseto (loan)	2010–11	Serie B	16	1	0	0	—		—		16	1
Pescara (loan)	2011–12	Serie B	37	28	0	0	—		—		37	28
Genoa	2012–13	Serie A	33	5	1	0	—		—		34	5
Torino	2013–14	Serie A	33	22	1	1	—		—		34	23
Borussia Dortmund	2014–15	Bundesliga	24	3	3	3	6	4	1 (Note: Appearance in DFL-Supercup)	0	34	10
Sevilla (loan)	2015–16	La Liga	8	2	3	2	3	0	1 (Note: Appearance in UEFA Super Cup)	0	15	4
Torino (loan)	2015–16	Serie A	14	5	0	0	—		—		14	5
Lazio	2016–17	Serie A	36	23	5	3	—		—		41	26
Lazio	2017–18	Serie A	33	29	4	2	9 (Note: Appearances in UEFA Europa League)	8	1 (Note: Appearance(s) in Supercoppa Italiana)	2	47	41
Lazio	2018–19	Serie A	36	15	5	3	5	1	—		46	19
Lazio	2019–20	Serie A	37	36	2	1	4	2	1	0	44	39
Lazio	2020–21	Serie A	35	20	1	0	5	5	—		41	25
Lazio	2021–22	Serie A	31	27	2	1	7	4	—		40	32
Lazio	2022–23	Serie A	31	12	1	0	6 (Note: Four appearances and one goal in UEFA Europa League, two appearances and one goal in UEFA Europa Conference League)	2	—		38	14
Lazio	2023–24	Serie A	31	7	3	0	8	4	1	0	43	11
Lazio	Total		270	169	23	10	44	26	3	2	340	207
Beşiktaş	2024–25	Süper Lig	30	15	2	0	8	2	1 (Note: Appearance in Turkish Super Cup)	2	41	19
Bologna	2025–26	Serie A	6	0	1	0	0	0	2	0	9	0
Paris FC	2025–26	Ligue 1	12	2	1	0	—		—		13	2
Career total			490	253	38	17	62	32	9	4	599	306

=== International ===
Appearances and goals by national team and year
National team	Year	Apps	Goals
Italy	2014	9	1
Italy	2015	3	0
Italy	2016	8	4
Italy	2017	10	2
Italy	2018	5	0
Italy	2019	4	3
Italy	2020	3	0
Italy	2021	12	5
Italy	2022	1	0
Italy	2023	2	2
Total		57	17

Scores and results list Italy's goal tally first, score column indicates score after each Immobile goal.

List of international goals scored by Ciro Immobile
No.	Date	Venue	Cap	Opponent	Score	Result	Competition
1	4 September 2014	Stadio San Nicola, Bari, Italy	5	Netherlands	1–0	2–0	Friendly
2	5 September 2016	Sammy Ofer Stadium, Haifa, Israel	16	Israel	3–1	3–1	2018 FIFA World Cup qualification
3	9 October 2016	Philip II Arena, Skopje, Macedonia	18	Macedonia	2–2	3–2	2018 FIFA World Cup qualification
4	9 October 2016	Philip II Arena, Skopje, Macedonia	18	Macedonia	3–2	3–2	2018 FIFA World Cup qualification
5	12 November 2016	Rheinpark Stadion, Vaduz, Liechtenstein	19	Liechtenstein	2–0	4–0	2018 FIFA World Cup qualification
6	24 March 2017	Stadio Renzo Barbera, Palermo, Italy	21	Albania	2–0	2–0	2018 FIFA World Cup qualification
7	5 September 2017	Mapei Stadium – Città del Tricolore, Reggio Emilia, Italy	26	Israel	1–0	1–0	2018 FIFA World Cup qualification
8	8 September 2019	Tampere Stadium, Tampere, Finland	37	Finland	1–0	2–1	UEFA Euro 2020 qualifying
9	18 November 2019	Stadio Renzo Barbera, Palermo, Italy	39	Armenia	1–0	9–1	UEFA Euro 2020 qualifying
10	18 November 2019	Stadio Renzo Barbera, Palermo, Italy	39	Armenia	4–0	9–1	UEFA Euro 2020 qualifying
11	25 March 2021	Stadio Ennio Tardini, Parma, Italy	43	Northern Ireland	2–0	2–0	2022 FIFA World Cup qualification
12	31 March 2021	LFF Stadium, Vilnius, Lithuania	45	Lithuania	2–0	2–0	2022 FIFA World Cup qualification
13	4 June 2021	Stadio Renato Dall'Ara, Bologna, Italy	46	Czech Republic	1–0	4–0	Friendly
14	11 June 2021	Stadio Olimpico, Rome, Italy	47	Turkey	2–0	3–0	UEFA Euro 2020
15	16 June 2021	Stadio Olimpico, Rome, Italy	48	Switzerland	3–0	3–0	UEFA Euro 2020
16	15 June 2023	De Grolsch Veste, Enschede, Netherlands	56	Spain	1–1	1–2	2023 UEFA Nations League Finals
17	9 September 2023	Toše Proeski Arena, Skopje, North Macedonia	57	North Macedonia	1–0	1–1	UEFA Euro 2024 qualifying

== Honours ==
Juventus Youth

- Torneo di Viareggio: 2009, 2010

Pescara

- Serie B: 2011–12

Borussia Dortmund

- DFL-Supercup: 2014

Lazio

- Coppa Italia: 2018–19
- Supercoppa Italiana: 2017, 2019

Beşiktaş

- Turkish Super Cup: 2024

Italy

- UEFA European Championship: 2020

Individual

- Torneo di Viareggio top scorer: 2010 (10 goals)
- Torneo di Viareggio Best Player: 2010
- Serie B Footballer of the Year: 2012
- Serie B top scorer: 2011–12 (28 goals)
- Capocannoniere: 2013–14 (22 goals), 2017–18 (joint with Mauro Icardi – 29 goals), 2019–20 (36 goals), 2021–22 (27 goals)
- Serie A Team of the Year: 2013–14, 2017–18, 2019–20, 2021–22
- UEFA Europa League top scorer: 2017–18 (joint with Aritz Aduriz – 8 goals)
- UEFA Europa League Squad of the Season: 2017–18
- Serie A Player of the Month: October 2019
- European Golden Shoe: 2019–20
- Serie A Best Forward: 2019–20, 2021–22
- Lazio Player of the Season: 2019–20
- Italian Sportsman of the Year: 2020

=== Orders ===
- 5th Class / Knight: Cavaliere Ordine al Merito della Repubblica Italiana: 2021
