= Aldo Puccinelli =

Italian footballer (1920–1994)

Personal information
- Full name: Aldo Puccinelli
- Date of birth: 25 December 1920
- Place of birth: Bientina, Pisa, Italy
- Date of death: 11 March 1994 (aged 73)
- Height: 1.55 m (5 ft 1 in)
- Position: Forward

Youth career
- –: Pontedera

Senior career*
Years	Team	Apps	(Gls)
1939–1940	Pontedera	–	(–)
1940–1943	Lazio	52	(11)
1943–1944	Massese	8	(2)
1945–1955	Lazio	287	(66)
1955–1957	Livorno	61	(15)
Total		408	(94)

Managerial career
- 1957–1959: Cuoiopelli
- 1961–1962: Siena
- 1969–1970: Livorno
- 1973–1974: Cuoiopelli
- 1975: Livorno
- * Club domestic league appearances and goals

Aldo Puccinelli (25 December 1920 – 11 March 1994) was an Italian association football player and manager who played as a forward. He held the record of league appearances with Lazio (339).
