= Giuseppe Wilson =

Italian former footballer (1945–2022)

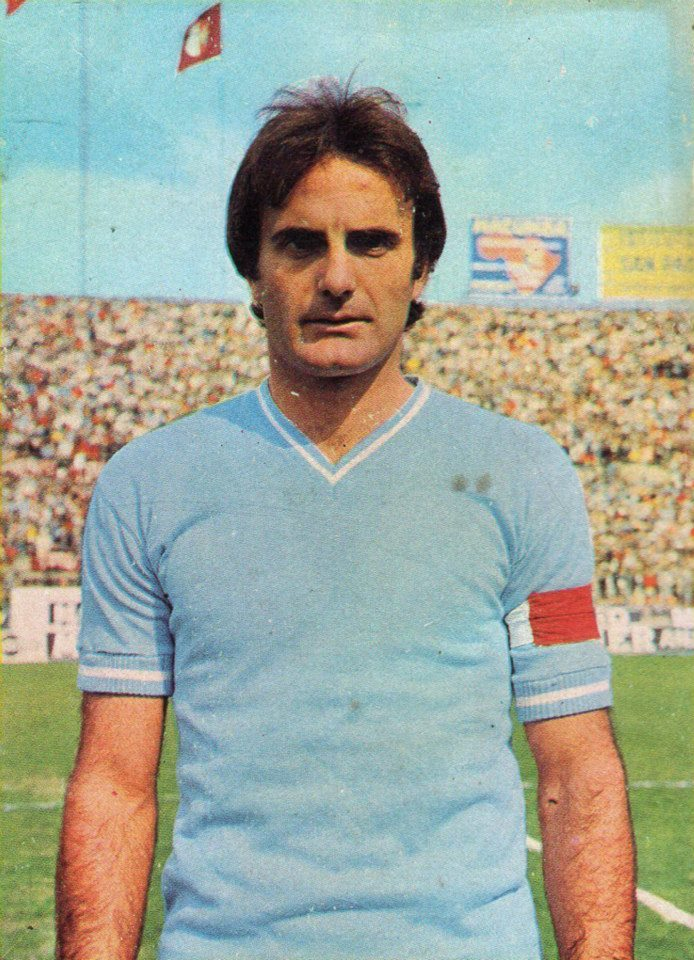
- Wilson in 1970s

Personal information
- Full name: Joseph Wilson
- Date of birth: 27 October 1945
- Place of birth: Darlington, County Durham, England
- Date of death: 6 March 2022 (aged 76)
- Place of death: Rome, Italy
- Position: Centre back

Senior career*
Years	Team	Apps	(Gls)
1964–1965	Cirio	18	(0)
1965–1969	Internapoli	138	(0)
1969–1980	Lazio	296	(4)
1978	→ New York Cosmos (loan)	16	(0)
1983	FC Inter-Montréal		
Total		468	(4)

International career
1974	Italy	3	(0)
- * Club domestic league appearances and goals

Giuseppe Wilson (Italian pronunciation: [dʒuˈzɛppe ˈwilson], born Joseph Wilson, 27 October 1945 – 6 March 2022), also known as Pino Wilson, was an Italian footballer who played as a centre back. Although born in Northern England, he played the majority of his football career in Italy.

At club level Wilson played for Internapoli and Lazio, as well as representing the Italy national team three times in 1974. Wilson was one of 15 named in the Italian football betting scandal in 1980 (along with Bruno Giordano, Massimo Cacciatori and Lionello Manfredonia, in the first instance).

== Early life ==
Wilson was born in Darlington to a Neapolitan woman Lina Di Francesca and Dennis Wilson, an Englishman who worked as an iron and steel worker at the local factory. Wilson's parents had met while Dennis was serving with the British Army in Italy. When Joseph Wilson was just six months old, his family moved to Naples, his mother's hometown as she found it hard to settle in the United Kingdom due to the cold winters. His father found a job as supervisor at a NATO base.

== Club career ==
=== Internapoli and Lazio ===
Wilson started his career with Internapoli in 1964–65 and he played for the side more than 150 times.

He joined S.S. Lazio in 1969. At Lazio he would enjoy his most notable spell as a footballer, staying with them for a decade playing over 300 games for them. This was a successful period for the club who won their first ever Serie A title in 1973–74 as well as the Coppa delle Alpi in 1971.

=== New York Cosmos ===
As his career wound down, Wilson spent a season in the United States, playing in the NASL league with the New York Cosmos during 1978, and winning the title. Wilson was named the Defensive Player of the game for Soccer Bowl '78.

=== Inter Montreal ===
In 1983, he joined FC Inter-Montréal of the Canadian Professional Soccer League.

== International career ==
Wilson's success with Lazio gained him a place in the Italy national team, and he was in the squad for the 1974 FIFA World Cup. He made his debut in a friendly 0–0 draw against West Germany in 1974, and he made two appearances at the 1974 World Cup, making three appearances in total for Italy.

== Retirement and death ==
Wilson was a pundit for Rai. In 2013, sport journalist Vincenzo Di Michele wrote Wilson's biography, Pino Wilson: a True Captain from Another Era. He was briefly involved with an Italian restaurant in his native Darlington named Casa di Chirico, after his grandmother's maiden name.

Wilson died from a stroke in Rome on 6 March 2022, at the age of 76.

== Honours ==
Lazio

- Coppa delle Alpi: 1971
- Serie A: 1973–74

New York Cosmos

- NASL: 1978
