= Ferruccio Mazzola =

Italian footballer (1945–2013)

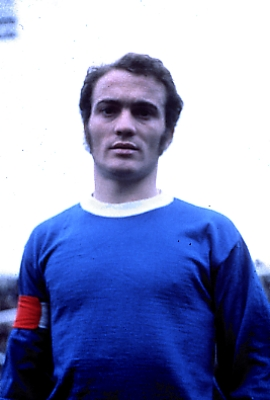
- Mazzola as captain of Lazio, c. 1968–71

Personal information
- Date of birth: 1 February 1945
- Place of birth: Turin, Piedmont, Kingdom of Italy
- Date of death: 7 May 2013 (aged 68)
- Place of death: Rome, Lazio, Italy
- Position: Midfielder

Youth career
- 1963–1964: Internazionale

Senior career*
Years	Team	Apps	(Gls)
1964–1965	Marzotto	22	(6)
1965–1967	Venezia	50	(13)
1967	Internazionale	1	(0)
1967–1968	Lecco	18	(1)
1968–1971	Lazio	85	(11)
1971–1972	Fiorentina	16	(1)
1972–1974	Lazio	1	(0)
1974–1977	Sant'Angelo	69	(3)
1975	→ Hartford Bicentennials (loan)	1	(0)
1976	Toronto Italia		
Total		263	(35)

Managerial career
- 1981–1983: Cynthia
- 1983–1986: Siena
- 1986–1987: SPAL
- 1987–1988: Venezia
- 1988–1989: Siena
- 1989–1990: Perugia
- 1990–1992: Spezia
- 1992–1993: Alessandria
- 1994–1995: Aosta
- * Club domestic league appearances and goals

Ferruccio Mazzola (Italian pronunciation: [ferˈruttʃo matˈtsɔːla]; 1 February 1945 – 7 May 2013) was an Italian professional footballer and manager, who played as a midfielder. He was the son of Valentino Mazzola, and the younger brother of Sandro Mazzola.

== Club career ==
Ferruccio grew up in Internazionale youth team (1963–64); at the time, his older brother, Sandro, was playing in the senior side under legendary manager Helenio Herrera, which, due to its success, has come to be known as La Grande Inter. He played for long periods with Venezia (1965–67), following his father's footsteps, and also Lazio (1968–74), where he won an Italian Championship during the 1973–74 season, also captaining the squad for a time. He also briefly played for the Inter senior side (1967), Marzotto (1964–65), Lecco (1967–68), Fiorentina (1971–72), and Sant'Angelo (1974–77), also spending a season on loan with NASL side Hartford Bicentennials in 1975, before retiring from professional football with Sant'Angelo in 1977, at the age of 30. In the summer of 1976 he played in the National Soccer League with Toronto Italia. Despite being a talented young footballer, he had a difficult career, partially due to his strong character, and was unable to achieve the success of his father and older brother.

== Managerial career ==
He retired from active football in 1977 to pursue a coaching career; he obtained two promotions from Serie C2 to C1 (Siena 1984–85 and Venezia 1987–88).

== Controversy ==
In 2004, in a book (Il terzo incomodo) and in an interview with L'espresso Mazzola spoke out against the use of performance-enhancing drugs in sport made by Internazionale, Lazio and Fiorentina during the 1960s and the 1970s.

In 2005, the prosecutor's office of Florence opened an investigation into the death of Fiorentina footballer Bruno Beatrice, hypothesizing that this could have been caused by doping. However, on 2 January 2009, it requested the dismissal of the case by the statute of limitations. Meanwhile, Internazionale chairman Massimo Moratti sued Mazzola for defamation about his statements. The ex-footballer won the legal case in 2010: according to the judgement's motivation, the claims in the book could not be considered libellous.

Several Grande Inter teammates denied those accusations, however, with one exception being Franco Zaglio, who said the use of illicit substances had been common for various Serie A clubs since the 1950s. Some years after Ferruccio's decease, his elder brother Sandro Mazzola declared that Ferruccio's complaint was motivated by a desire for "revenge" against Internazionale and that the true doping of Helenio Herrera was "psychological". Luna Herrera, Helenio's daughter, pointed out that her father was a committed health enthusiast, and that he would only give his players cachets of acetylsalicylic acid, which were taken with coffee as stimulants.

== Death ==
Mazzola died in Rome on 7 May 2013 after a long illness.

== Honours ==
Venezia

- Serie B: 1965–66

Lazio

- Serie A: 1973–74
- Coppa delle Alpi: 1971
- Serie B: 1968–69
