= Vigliano (surname) =

Vigliano is a surname. Notable people with the surname include:

- David Vigliano, American literary agent
- Mauro Vigliano, Argentine football referee
- Nadia Vigliano, French javelin thrower
- Sandro Vigliano, Italian rugby union player

== See also ==
- Vigliano (disambiguation)
