= Paolo Viganò =

Italian footballer (1950–2014)

Personal information
- Date of birth: February 11, 1950
- Place of birth: Seregno, Italy
- Date of death: May 22, 2014 (aged 64)
- Height: 1.74 m (5 ft 8 1/2 in)
- Position: Defender

Senior career*
Years	Team	Apps	(Gls)
1969–1970	Juventus	2	(0)
1970–1971	Roma	1	(0)
1971–1972	Monza	31	(0)
1972–1975	Palermo	86	(0)
1975–1978	Brescia	66	(2)
1978–1980	Novara	62	(0)
1980–1981	Monza	26	(0)
- * Club domestic league appearances and goals

Paolo Viganò (February 11, 1950 in Seregno – May 22, 2014) was an Italian professional football player. He played primarily as a defender while playing in Juventus, making appearances in Serie A, Italy's top football league. Viganò also had stints with lower-division teams, like A.C. Monza and Palermo. During his career, he played in several competitions, including the Coppa Italia and Serie B.
