= Fernando Saraceni =

Italian footballer

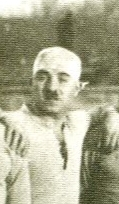

Personal information
- Date of birth: 19 January 1891
- Place of birth: Rome, Italy
- Date of death: 1956
- Place of death: Italy
- Positions: Forward; defender

Senior career*
Years	Team	Apps	(Gls)
1907–1924	Lazio	124	(36)
- * Club domestic league appearances and goals

Fernando Saraceni (19 January 1891 – 1956) was an Italian footballer. His brother Luigi Saraceni was also a footballer and played as a defender for Lazio in 1920s.

Fernando began his football career in 1907 and spent his entire career playing for Lazio. He played first in a forward role, but since 1921, he was deployed in a full back role. He was also the club's captain from 1919 to 1923. Saraceni scored two goals in the 1923–24 Prima Divisione season.

In 1915 he served the Italian Army during the World War I. He retired from football in 1924; later he held management roles for Lazio. He died in 1956.

== See also ==
- List of one-club men
