= Roberto Badiani =

Italian footballer (born 1949)

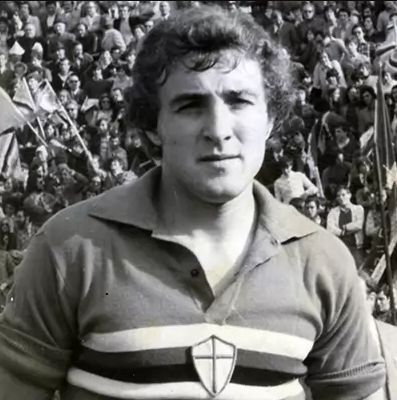
- Badiani with Sampdoria

Personal information
- Date of birth: 9 October 1949 (age 76)
- Place of birth: Toscana, Italy
- Height: 1.75 m (5 ft 9 in)
- Position: Midfielder

Senior career*
Years	Team	Apps	(Gls)
1968–1969	Sangiovannese	23	(0)
1969–1971	Livorno	50	(7)
1971	Mantova	21	(2)
1972–1974	Sampdoria	57	(5)
1974–1979	Lazio	127	(3)
1979–1980	→ Napoli (loan)	4	(0)
1980–1981	→ Pistoiese (loan)	22	(2)
1981–1983	Lazio	54	(3)
1983–1984	Senigallia	28	(2)
- * Club domestic league appearances and goals

Roberto Badiani (born 9 October 1949) is an Italian former professional footballer who played as a midfielder.
