= Luigi Martini =

Italian footballer

Personal information
- Full name: Luigi Martini
- Date of birth: 15 June 1949 (age 77)
- Place of birth: Capannori, Italy
- Position: Defender

Senior career*
Years	Team	Apps	(Gls)
1966–1968	Lucchese	33	(0)
1968–1969	Siena	34	(2)
1969–1971	Livorno	55	(1)
1971–1979	Lazio	203	(8)
1979	Chicago Sting	7	(0)
1981	Toronto Blizzard	14	(0)

International career
1974	Italy	1	(0)
- * Club domestic league appearances and goals

Luigi Martini (Italian pronunciation: [luˈiːdʒi marˈtiːni]; born 15 June 1949) is a former Italian professional footballer who played as a defender. On 29 December 1974, he represented the Italy national football team on the occasion of a friendly match against Bulgaria in a 0–0 home draw.

== Honours ==
=== Player ===
Lazio

Serie A: 1973–74
