= Vincenzo D'Amico =

Italian footballer (1954–2023)

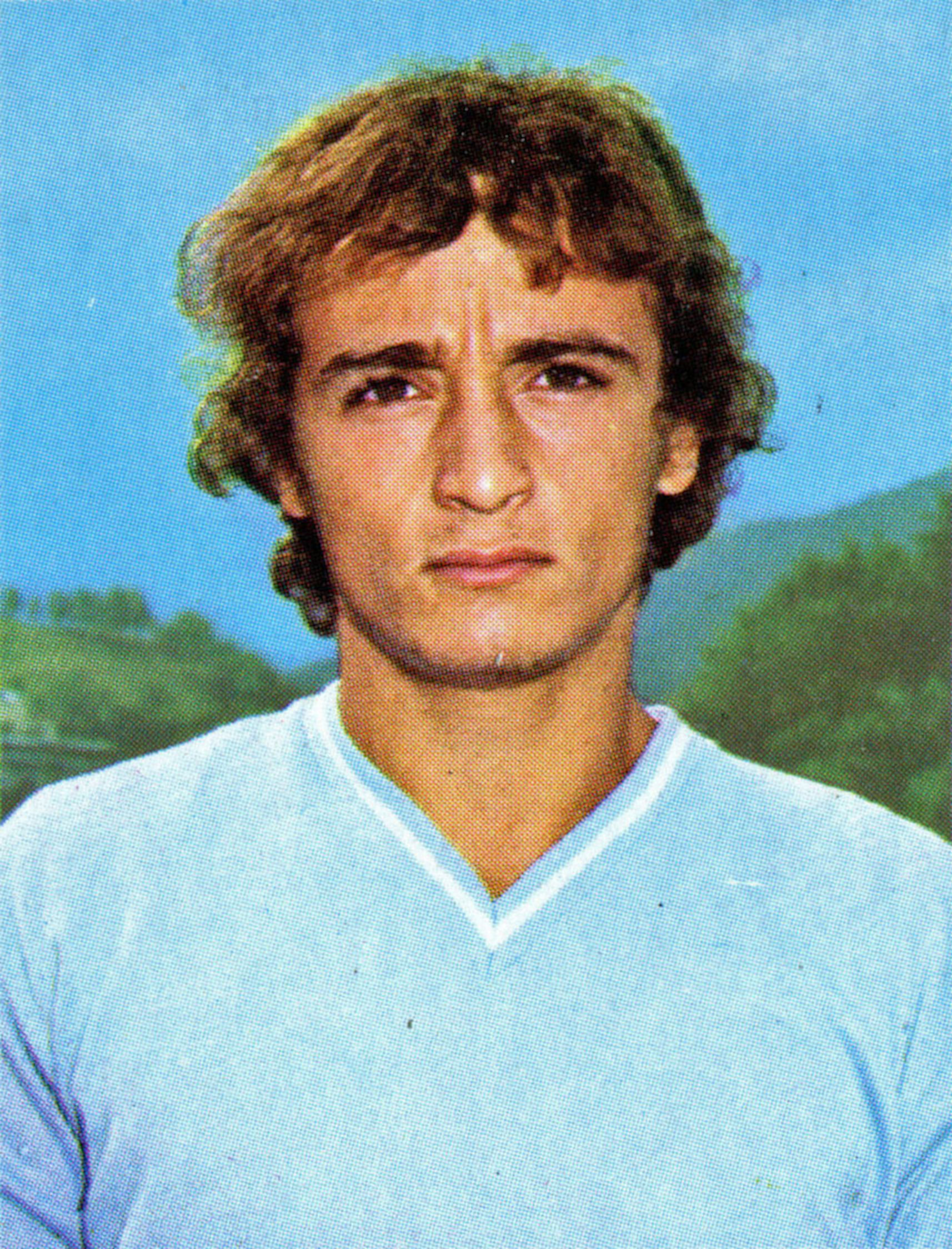
- D'Amico with Lazio in 1973

Personal information
- Date of birth: 5 November 1954
- Place of birth: Latina, Italy
- Date of death: 1 July 2023 (aged 68)
- Place of death: Rome, Italy
- Position: Midfielder

Youth career
- 1970–1972: Lazio

Senior career*
Years	Team	Apps	(Gls)
1972–1980	Lazio	155	(16)
1980–1981	Torino	26	(1)
1981–1985	Lazio	111	(23)
1986–1988	Ternana	56	(20)
Total		348	(60)
- * Club domestic league appearances and goals

Vincenzo D'Amico (5 November 1954 – 1 July 2023) was an Italian footballer who played as a midfielder or forward. In all, he played seventeen seasons in Italian professional football, mostly for S.S. Lazio.

In 1985, D'Amico played for the New York Cosmos in a friendly match against Lazio in Giants Stadium in New Jersey -- Giorgio Chinaglia, who owned both clubs, assigned D'Amico to the New York roster. Lazio won, 2–1, with D'Amico scoring the only goal for New York; it turned out to be the last goal in the history of the original Cosmos, as the club folded soon thereafter.

D'Amico died from cancer at Gemelli hospital on 1 July 2023, at the age of 68.

== Honours ==
Lazio

- Serie A: 1973–74

Individual

- Italian Football Hall of Fame: 2023
