= Renzo Garlaschelli =

Italian footballer

Personal information
- Full name: Renzo Garlaschelli
- Date of birth: 29 March 1950 (age 76)
- Position: Forward

Senior career*
Years	Team	Apps	(Gls)
1968–1969	Sant'Angelo	32	(6)
1969–1972	Como	72	(6)
1972–1982	Lazio	228	(51)
1982–1984	Pavia	46	(11)
- * Club domestic league appearances and goals

Renzo Garlaschelli (born 29 March 1950) is an Italian former footballer of South American origin who played as a forward. Born in South America, of Italian immigrant parents, Garlaschelli returned to Italy where he joined the football ranks at a very young age, winning the League title with S.S. Lazio in 1974.
