= 1973–74 Serie A =

71st season of top-tier Italian football

Serie A
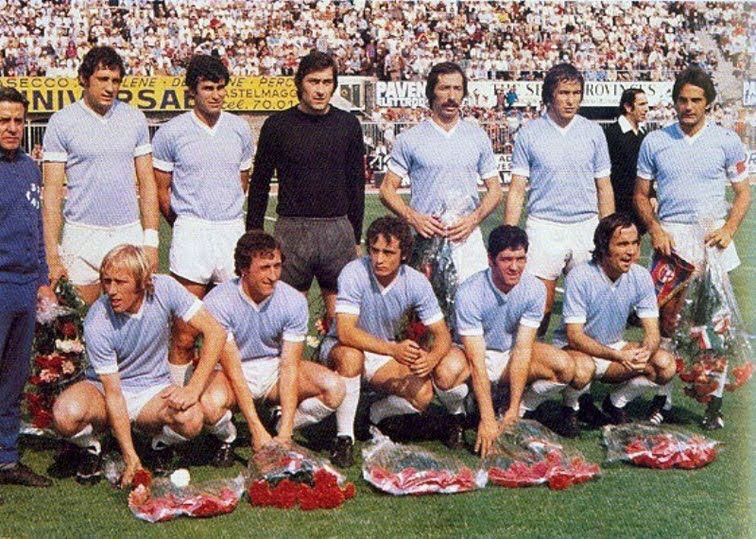
- 1973–74 Lazio team
- Season: 1973–74
- Dates: 7 October 1973 – 19 May 1974
- Champions: Lazio; 1st title
- Relegated: Foggia; Genoa; Hellas Verona
- Cup Winners' Cup: Bologna
- UEFA Cup: Juventus; Napoli; Internazionale; Torino
- Matches: 240
- Goals: 497 (2.07 per match)
- Top goalscorer: Giorgio Chinaglia (24 goals)

Serie A 1973-74 team distribution

The 1973–74 Serie A season was won by Lazio.

== Teams ==
Genoa, Cesena and Foggia had been promoted from Serie B.

== Final classification ==
Pos	Team	Pld	W	D	L	GF	GA	GD	Pts	Qualification or relegation
1	Lazio (C)	30	18	7	5	45	23	+22	43	Disqualified from the European Cup
2	Juventus	30	16	9	5	50	26	+24	41	Qualification to UEFA Cup
3	Napoli	30	12	12	6	35	28	+7	36	Qualification to UEFA Cup
4	Internazionale	30	12	11	7	47	33	+14	35	Qualification to UEFA Cup
5	Torino	30	10	14	6	27	24	+3	34	Qualification to UEFA Cup
6	Fiorentina	30	10	13	7	32	26	+6	33	
7	Milan	30	11	8	11	34	36	−2	30	
8	Roma	30	10	9	11	29	28	+1	29	
9	Bologna	30	6	17	7	35	36	−1	29	Qualification to Cup Winners' Cup
10	Cagliari	30	7	14	9	25	32	−7	28	
11	Cesena	30	6	15	9	25	28	−3	27	
12	Vicenza	30	7	12	11	22	37	−15	26	
13	Sampdoria (Note: 3 points deducted for alleged bribery.)	30	5	13	12	27	34	−7	20	
14	Foggia (Note: 6 points deducted for bribery.) (R)	30	6	12	12	20	34	−14	18	Relegation to Serie B
15	Genoa (R)	30	4	9	17	16	37	−21	17	Relegation to Serie B
16	Hellas Verona (Note: Demoted in the last place for bribery by the Federation.) (D, R)	30	8	9	13	28	35	−7	25	Relegation to Serie B

Source: Panini
(C) Champions; (D) Disqualified; (R) Relegated

== Results ==
Home \ Away	BOL	CAG	CES	FIO	FOG	GEN	INT	JUV	LRV	LAZ	MIL	NAP	ROM	SAM	TOR	HEL
Bologna		3–1	1–1	1–1	0–0	2–0	3–0	0–0	4–0	2–2	3–2	2–2	0–0	2–1	2–2	1–2
Cagliari	0–0		0–0	1–0	1–0	0–1	1–1	2–1	2–0	0–1	0–1	0–0	1–1	2–1	1–1	1–1
Cesena	3–0	1–1		0–0	2–0	1–1	0–1	0–2	2–2	0–0	1–0	1–1	1–1	2–1	0–0	1–0
Fiorentina	1–1	4–1	0–0		0–1	0–0	1–0	2–0	0–1	1–1	3–2	1–1	1–0	1–1	3–1	2–1
Foggia	1–1	1–1	1–1	2–1		1–0	1–2	0–0	2–1	0–1	0–0	1–0	1–0	2–2	1–1	1–1
Genoa	1–1	1–1	1–2	0–1	2–1		1–1	0–1	1–1	1–2	0–1	1–2	2–1	0–2	0–2	1–0
Internazionale	1–1	0–1	3–1	1–1	5–1	0–0		0–2	2–0	3–1	2–1	2–2	2–0	2–1	3–0	0–0
Juventus	1–1	1–1	2–2	3–1	2–1	3–0	2–0		0–0	3–1	2–0	4–1	2–1	2–0	1–1	5–1
Vicenza	2–1	1–1	0–0	2–1	1–0	1–1	1–0	0–3		0–3	1–1	2–1	0–1	0–0	0–0	1–1
Lazio	4–0	2–0	2–0	0–0	1–0	1–0	1–1	3–1	3–0		1–0	1–0	2–1	1–0	0–1	4–2
Milan	1–1	2–2	1–0	1–1	1–0	2–0	1–5	2–2	1–2	0–0		0–0	2–0	2–1	1–0	2–1
Napoli	2–0	1–0	1–0	2–1	1–1	1–0	2–1	2–0	2–1	3–3	1–2		1–1	1–0	1–1	2–0
Roma	2–1	2–0	1–0	0–0	3–0	2–0	3–3	3–2	0–0	1–2	1–2	0–1		2–1	0–0	1–0
Sampdoria	0–0	1–1	1–1	1–2	0–0	1–1	1–1	1–2	2–1	1–0	3–2	0–0	0–0		1–1	2–1
Torino	2–0	1–2	2–1	0–1	0–0	1–0	2–2	0–1	1–0	2–1	1–0	1–1	1–0	1–1		0–0
Hellas Verona	1–1	2–0	2–1	1–1	3–0	2–0	1–3	0–0	1–1	0–1	2–1	1–0	0–1	1–0	0–1	

Source: Almanacco Illustrato del Calcio – La Storia 1898–2004, Panini Edizioni, Modena, September 2005 (in Italian)
Legend: Blue = home team win; Yellow = draw; Red = away team win.

== Top goalscorers ==
Rank	Player	Club	Goals
1	(Italy) Giorgio Chinaglia	Lazio	24
2	(Italy) Roberto Boninsegna	Internazionale	23
3	(Brazil) Sergio Clerici	Napoli	17
4	(Italy) Pietro Anastasi	Juventus	16
5	(Italy) Luigi Riva	Cagliari	15
6	(Italy) Paolo Pulici	Torino	14
7	(Italy) Giuseppe Savoldi	Bologna	12
7	(Italy) Antonello Cuccureddu	Juventus	12
9	(Italy) Luciano Chiarugi	Milan	11
10	(Italy) Renzo Garlaschelli	Lazio	10

== Attendances ==
#	Club	Average
1	Napoli	62,665
2	Lazio	49,833
3	Internazionale	49,548
4	Roma	47,597
5	Milan	47,466
6	Juventus	43,916
7	Fiorentina	35,328
8	Torino	34,549
9	Bologna	30,052
10	Genoa	29,510
11	Cagliari	24,640
12	Sampdoria	23,837
13	Hellas Verona	23,612
14	Cesena	21,201
15	Foggia	18,099
16	Vicenza	16,774

== References and sources ==
- Almanacco Illustrato del Calcio – La Storia 1898–2004, Panini Edizioni, Modena, September 2005
