= List of SS Lazio seasons =

This is a list of seasons played by SS Lazio in Italian and European football. It details the club's achievements in major competitions, managers, and top league goalscorers for each season.

== Key ==
- CL = UEFA Champions League
- EC = European Cup
- EL = UEFA Europa League
- UC = UEFA Cup
- ECL = UEFA Europa Conference League
- ICFC = Inter-Cities Fairs Cup
- UIC = UEFA Intertoto Cup
- CWC = European Cup Winners' Cup
- USC = UEFA Super Cup
- IC = Intercontinental Cup
- CDA = Cup of the Alps
- AIC = Anglo-Italian Cup
- MIT = Mitropa Cup
- AMI = Coppa dell'Amicizia
- LC = Latin Cup
- Pld = Matches played
- W = Matches won
- D = Matches drawn
- L = Matches lost
- GF = Goals for
- GA = Goals against
- Pts = Points
- Pos = Final position
- F = Final
- SF = Semi-finals
- QF = Quarter-finals
- R16 = Round of 16
- R32 = Round of 32
- KPO = Knockout play-offs
- GS = Group stage
- GS2 = Second group stage
- N/A = Did not qualify
- – = Tournament did not occur
- QR1 = First qualifying round
- QR2 = Second qualifying round
- QR3 = Third qualifying round
- QR4 = Fourth qualifying round
- RInt = Intermediate round
- R1 = Round 1
- R2 = Round 2
- R3 = Round 3
- R4 = Round 4
- R5 = Round 5
- R6 = Round 6

Winner	Runners-up	Third place	Promotion	Relegation	Top goalscorer in Serie A

== Seasons ==
As of 24 May 2026

Season	League^{1}									Coppa Italia^{2}	UEFA Continental	Supercoppa Italiana^{3}	Manager(s)	Top goalscorer(s)^{4}	
Season	Division	Pld	W	D	L	GF	GA	Pts	Pos	Coppa Italia^{2}	UEFA Continental	Supercoppa Italiana^{3}	Manager(s)	Top goalscorer(s)^{4}	
1901–02										–	N/A	–	(France) (Italy) Bruto Seghettini		
1902–03										–	N/A	–	(Italy) Sante Ancherani		
1903–04										–	N/A	–	(Italy) Sante Ancherani		
1904–05										–	N/A	–	(Italy) Sante Ancherani		
1905–06										–	N/A	–	(Italy) Sante Ancherani		
1906–07	Campionato Romano	2	2	0	0	5	0	4	1st	–	N/A	–	(Italy) Sante Ancherani (Italy) Guido Baccani		
1907–08										–	N/A	–	(Malta) Silvio Mizzi (Italy) Guido Baccani		
1908–09										–	N/A	–	(Italy) Guido Baccani		
1909–10	Terza Categoria	6	6	0	0	31	2	12	1st	–	N/A	–	(Italy) Guido Baccani		
1910–11	Terza Categoria	4	4	0	0	9	0	8	1st	–	N/A	–	(Italy) Guido Baccani		
1911–12	Terza Categoria	10	9	0	1	52	7	18	1st	–	N/A	–	(Italy) Guido Baccani		
1912–13	Prima Categoria	13	9	3	1	60	18	21	2nd	–	N/A	–	(Italy) Guido Baccani		
1913–14	Prima Categoria	16	14	0	2	66	14	20	2nd	–	N/A	–	(Italy) Guido Baccani	(Italy) Fernando Saraceni	16
1914–15	Prima Categoria	16	12	1	3	54	23	25	1st	–	N/A	–	(Italy) Guido Baccani	(Italy) Marcello Consiglio	13
No competitive football was played between 1915 and 1919 due to the First World War
1919–20	Prima Categoria/Laziale	12	6	2	4	22	11	14	3rd	–	N/A	–	(Italy) Guido Baccani		
1920–21	Prima Categoria/Laziale	18	10	3	5	52	26	23	3rd	–	N/A	–	(Italy) Guido Baccani	(Italy) Giuseppe Fioranti	8
1921–22	Prima Divisione (C.C.I.)/Laziale	16	8	4	4	35	22	20	4th	N/A	N/A	–	(Italy) Guido Baccani	(Italy) Dante Filippi	10
1922–23	Prima Divisione/Laziale	20	15	2	3	69	28	29	2nd	–	N/A	–	(Italy) Guido Baccani	(Italy) Fulvio Bernardini	22
1923–24	Prima Divisione/Laziale	16	10	2	4	55	20	23	2nd	–	N/A	–	(Italy) Guido Baccani	(Italy) Fulvio Bernardini	19
1924–25	Prima Divisione/Laziale	14	8	3	3	33	18	19	3rd	–	N/A	–	(Hungary) Dezső Kőszegy	(Italy) Fulvio Bernardini	16
1925–26	Prima Divisione/Laziale	10	6	2	2	45	27	14	3rd	–	N/A	–	(Hungary) Dezső Kőszegy	(Italy) Fulvio Bernardini	14
1926–27	Prima Divisione	24	17	1	6	40	30	35	4th	N/A	N/A	–	(Hungary) Jenő Ligeti	(Italy) Dante Filippi	10
1927–28	Divisione Nazionale/A	20	4	3	13	17	45	11	10th	–	N/A	–	(Austria) Franz Sedlacek	(Italy) Renato Sanero	4
1928–29	Divisione Nazionale/B	30	13	3	14	47	39	29	8th	–	N/A	–	(Austria) Franz Sedlacek; Technical Commission	(Italy) Aldo Spivach	13
1929–30	Serie A	34	10	8	16	49	50	28	15th	–	N/A	–	(Italy) Pietro Piselli	(Italy) Luigi Ziroli	11
1930–31	Serie A	34	15	5	14	45	44	35	8th	–	N/A	–	(Hungary) Ferenc Molnár	(Italy) Piero Pastore	13
1931–32	Serie A	34	10	7	17	45	53	27	13th	–	N/A	–	(Brazil) Amílcar Barbuy	(Italy) (Brazil) Anfilogino Guarisi	12
1932–33	Serie A	34	12	9	13	42	44	33	10th	–	N/A	–	(Austria) Karl Stürmer	(Brazil) João Fantoni	10
1933–34	Serie A	34	11	9	14	48	66	31	10th	–	N/A	–	(Austria) Karl Stürmer (Czech Republic) Walter Alt	(Italy) (Brazil) Anfilogino Guarisi	12
1934–35	Serie A	30	13	6	11	55	46	32	5th	–	N/A	–	(Czech Republic) Walter Alt	(Italy) Silvio Piola	21
1935–36	Serie A	30	11	8	11	48	42	30	7th	QF	N/A	–	(Czech Republic) Walter Alt (Hungary) József Viola	(Italy) Silvio Piola	19
1936–37	Serie A	30	17	5	8	56	42	39	2nd	R32	MIT Runners-up	–	(Hungary) József Viola	(Italy) Silvio Piola	21
1937–38	Serie A	30	11	10	9	48	30	32	8th	R32	N/A	–	(Hungary) József Viola	(Italy) Silvio Piola	15
1938–39	Serie A	30	11	6	13	33	40	28	10th	R16	N/A	–	(Hungary) József Viola (Italy) Luigi Allemandi (Argentina) Alfredo Di Franco	(Italy) Silvio Piola	9
1939–40	Serie A	30	12	11	7	44	46	35	4th	QF	N/A	–	(Hungary) Géza Kertész	(Italy) Silvio Piola (Argentina) Silvestro Pisa	9
1940–41	Serie A	30	7	13	10	38	42	27	14th	SF	N/A	–	(Hungary) Géza Kertész (Hungary) Ferenc Molnár (Italy) Dino Canestri	(Italy) Silvio Piola	10
1941–42	Serie A	30	14	9	7	55	37	37	4th	R16	N/A	–	(Austria) Alexander Popovic	(Italy) Silvio Piola	18
1942–43	Serie A	30	10	8	12	56	59	28	9th	QF	N/A	–	(Austria) Alexander Popovic	(Italy) Silvio Piola	21
1943–44	1943–44 Roman War Championship	18	14	4	0	60	8	32	1st	–	N/A	–	(Italy) Dino Canestri	(Italy) Umberto Lombardini	21
No competitive football was played between 1944 and 1945 due to the Second World War
1945–46	Serie A-B	20	6	5	9	19	19	17	7th	–	N/A	–	(Italy) Dino Canestri (Argentina) Salvador Gualtieri (Austria) Tony Cargnelli	(Austria) Engelbert Koenig	11
1946–47	Serie A	38	12	12	14	56	56	36	10th	–	N/A	–	(Austria) Tony Cargnelli	(Italy) Aldo Puccinelli	13
1947–48	Serie A	40	13	13	14	54	55	39	10th	–	N/A	–	(Austria) Tony Cargnelli (Italy) Orlando Tognotti	(Italy) Romano Penzo	17
1948–49	Serie A	38	11	12	15	60	62	34	13th	–	N/A	–	(Italy) Orlando Tognotti (Italy) Mario Sperone	(Italy) Romano Penzo	12
1949–50	Serie A	38	18	10	10	67	43	46	4th	–	LC 4th	–	(Italy) Mario Sperone	(Romania) Norberto Höfling	13
1950–51	Serie A	38	18	10	10	64	50	46	4th	–	MIT 4th	–	(Italy) Mario Sperone	(Romania) Norberto Höfling	11
1951–52	Serie A	38	15	13	10	60	49	43	4th	–	N/A	–	(Italy) Giuseppe Bigogno	(Turkey) Şükrü Gülesin	16
1952–53	Serie A	34	12	7	15	38	44	31	10th	–	N/A	–	(Italy) Giuseppe Bigogno (Italy) Alfredo Notti	(Italy) Paolo Bettolini (Norway) Ragnar Nikolay Larsen	7
1953–54	Serie A	34	10	9	15	40	42	29	11th	–	N/A	–	(Italy) Mario Sperone (Italy) Federico Allasio	(Italy) Alberto Fontanesi (Italy) Pasquale Vivolo	9
1954–55	Serie A	34	11	8	15	41	52	30	12th	–	N/A	–	(Italy) Federico Allasio (Italy) Roberto Copernico (England) George Raynor	(Denmark) John Hansen	15
1955–56	Serie A	34	14	11	9	54	46	39	3rd	–	N/A	–	(Italy) Roberto Copernico (England) Jesse Carver (Italy) Luigi Ferrero	(Italy) Lorenzo Bettini	12
1956–57	Serie A	34	14	13	7	52	40	41	3rd	–	N/A	–	(England) Jesse Carver	(Sweden) Arne Selmosson	12
1957–58	Serie A	34	10	10	14	45	65	30	12th	Champions	N/A	–	(Socialist Federal Republic of Yugoslavia) Milovan Ćirić (Italy) Alfredo Monza (Italy) Dino Canestri (Italy) Fulvio Bernardini	(Sweden) Arne Selmosson	9
1958–59	Serie A	34	10	10	14	37	54	30	11th	QF	N/A	–	(Italy) Fulvio Bernardini	(Brazil) Humberto Tozzi	14
1959–60	Serie A	34	9	12	13	32	45	30	12th	SF	AMI Champions	–	(Italy) Fulvio Bernardini	(Italy) Orlando Rozzoni	13
1960–61	Serie A	34	5	8	21	30	63	18	18th	Runners-up	CDA Champions	–	(Italy) Fulvio Bernardini (Italy) (Argentina) Enrique Flamini (England) Jesse Carver	(Italy) Orlando Rozzoni	11
1961–62	Serie B	38	14	14	10	50	28	42	4th	R2	N/A	–	(Italy) Paolo Todeschini (Italy) Roberto Lovati (Italy) Alfonso Ricciardi (Italy) Carlo Facchini	(Argentina) Juan Carlos Morrone	13
1962–63	Serie B	38	18	12	8	50	31	48	2nd	R1	N/A	–	(Italy) Carlo Facchini (Italy) Roberto Lovati (Argentina) Juan Carlos Lorenzo	(Italy) Paolo Bernasconi (Argentina) Juan Carlos Morrone (Italy) Orlando Rozzoni	10
1963–64	Serie A	34	9	12	13	21	24	30	8th	R2	N/A	–	(Argentina) Juan Carlos Lorenzo	(Italy) Mario Maraschi (Argentina) Juan Carlos Morrone	5
1964–65	Serie A	34	8	13	13	25	38	29	14th	GS	N/A	–	(Italy) Umberto Mannocci	(Italy) Nello Governato (Italy) Antonio Renna	4
1965–66	Serie A	34	8	13	13	28	41	29	12th	GS	N/A	–	(Italy) Umberto Mannocci	(Italy) Vito D'Amato	7
1966–67	Serie A	34	6	15	13	20	35	27	15th	R2	MIT QF	–	(Italy) Umberto Mannocci (Italy) Maino Neri	(Italy) Romano Bagatti (Argentina) Juan Carlos Morrone	4
1967–68	Serie B	40	10	18	12	27	33	38	11th	R2	N/A	–	(Italy) Renato Gei (Italy) Roberto Lovati	(Italy) Giuliano Fortunato	5
1968–69	Serie B	38	17	16	5	55	27	50	1st	GS	N/A	–	(Argentina) Juan Carlos Lorenzo	(Italy) Gian Piero Ghio	10
1969–70	Serie A	30	11	7	12	33	32	29	8th	GS	MIT R16; CDA GS; AIC GS	–	(Italy) Roberto Lovati (Argentina) Juan Carlos Lorenzo	(Italy) Giorgio Chinaglia	12
1970–71	Serie A	30	5	12	13	28	43	22	15th	R2	ICFC R1; CDA Champions	–	(Argentina) Juan Carlos Lorenzo (Italy) Roberto Lovati	(Italy) Giorgio Chinaglia	9
1971–72	Serie B	38	18	13	7	48	28	49	2nd	R2	N/A	–	(Italy) Tommaso Maestrelli	(Italy) Giorgio Chinaglia	21
1972–73	Serie A	30	16	11	3	33	16	43	3rd	QF	AIC GS	–	(Italy) Tommaso Maestrelli	(Italy) Giorgio Chinaglia	10
1973–74	Serie A	30	18	7	5	45	23	43	1st	QF	UC R2	–	(Italy) Tommaso Maestrelli	(Italy) Giorgio Chinaglia	24
1974–75	Serie A	30	14	9	7	34	28	37	4th	GS	N/A	–	(Italy) Tommaso Maestrelli	(Italy) Giorgio Chinaglia	14
1975–76	Serie A	30	6	11	13	35	40	23	13th	GS	UC R2	–	(Italy) Giulio Corsini (Italy) Tommaso Maestrelli	(Italy) Giorgio Chinaglia	8
1976–77	Serie A	30	10	11	9	34	28	31	5th	GS	N/A	–	(Brazil) Luís Vinício	(Italy) Bruno Giordano	10
1977–78	Serie A	30	8	10	12	31	38	26	11th	GS	UC R2	–	(Brazil) Luís Vinício (Italy) Roberto Lovati	(Italy) Bruno Giordano	13
1978–79	Serie A	30	9	11	10	35	40	29	8th	GS	N/A	–	(Italy) Roberto Lovati	(Italy) Bruno Giordano	19
1979–80	Serie A	30	5	15	10	21	25	25	13th	QF	N/A	–	(Italy) Roberto Lovati	(Italy) Bruno Giordano	9
1980–81	Serie B	38	13	20	5	50	32	46	4th	R2	N/A	–	(Italy) Ilario Castagner	(Italy) Alberto Bigon (Italy) Fernando Viola	8
1981–82	Serie B	38	11	15	12	38	35	37	10th	R2	N/A	–	(Italy) Ilario Castagner (Italy) Roberto Clagluna	(Italy) Vincenzo D'Amico	10
1982–83	Serie B	38	14	18	6	44	32	46	2nd	R2	N/A	–	(Italy) Roberto Clagluna (Argentina) Juan Carlos Morrone (Italy) Roberto Lovati	(Italy) Bruno Giordano	18
1983–84	Serie A	30	8	9	13	35	49	25	13th	GS	N/A	–	(Argentina) Juan Carlos Morrone (Italy) Paolo Carosi	(Italy) Bruno Giordano (Denmark) Michael Laudrup	8
1984–85	Serie A	30	2	11	17	16	45	15	15th	GS	N/A	–	(Italy) Paolo Carosi (Argentina) Juan Carlos Lorenzo (Italy) Giancarlo Oddi (Italy) Roberto Lovati	(Italy) Bruno Giordano	5
1985–86	Serie B	38	11	14	13	38	42	36	11th	GS	N/A	–	(Italy) Luigi Simoni	(Italy) Oliviero Garlini	18
1986–87	Serie B	38	14	14	10	35	28	33	16th	R16	N/A	–	(Italy) Eugenio Fascetti	(Italy) Giuliano Fiorini	7
1987–88	Serie B	38	15	17	6	42	25	47	3rd	R2	N/A	–^{*}	(Italy) Eugenio Fascetti	(Italy) Paolo Monelli	13
1988–89	Serie A	34	5	19	10	23	32	29	10th	QF	N/A	N/A	(Italy) Giuseppe Materazzi	(Uruguay) Rubén Sosa	8
1989–90	Serie A	34	8	15	11	34	33	31	9th	R2	N/A	N/A	(Italy) Giuseppe Materazzi	(Uruguay) Rubén Sosa (Brazil) Amarildo	8
1990–91	Serie A	34	8	19	7	33	36	35	11th	R2	N/A	N/A	(Italy) Dino Zoff	(Uruguay) Rubén Sosa	11
1991–92	Serie A	34	11	12	11	43	40	34	10th	R16	N/A	N/A	(Italy) Dino Zoff	(Germany) Karl-Heinz Riedle (Uruguay) Rubén Sosa	13
1992–93	Serie A	34	13	12	9	65	51	38	5th	QF	N/A	N/A	(Italy) Dino Zoff	(Italy) Giuseppe Signori	26
1993–94	Serie A	34	17	10	7	55	40	44	4th	R2	UC R2	N/A	(Italy) Dino Zoff	(Italy) Giuseppe Signori	23
1994–95	Serie A	34	19	6	9	69	34	63	2nd	R2	UC QF	N/A	(Czech Republic) Zdeněk Zeman	(Italy) Giuseppe Signori	17
1995–96	Serie A	34	17	8	9	66	38	59	3rd	QF	UC R2	N/A	(Czech Republic) Zdeněk Zeman	(Italy) Giuseppe Signori	24
1996–97	Serie A	34	15	10	9	54	37	55	4th	QF	UC R2	N/A	(Czech Republic) Zdeněk Zeman (Italy) Dino Zoff	(Italy) Giuseppe Signori	15
1997–98	Serie A	34	16	8	10	53	30	56	7th	Champions	UC Runners-up	N/A	(Sweden) Sven-Göran Eriksson	(Czech Republic) Pavel Nedvěd	11
1998–99	Serie A	34	20	9	5	65	31	69	2nd	QF	CWC Champions	Winners	(Sweden) Sven-Göran Eriksson	(Chile) Marcelo Salas	15
1999–2000	Serie A	34	21	9	4	64	33	72	1st	Champions	CL QF; USC Champions	N/A	(Sweden) Sven-Göran Eriksson	(Chile) Marcelo Salas	13
2000–01	Serie A	34	21	6	7	65	36	69	3rd	QF	CL 2nd GS	Winners	(Sweden) Sven-Göran Eriksson| (Italy) Dino Zoff	(Argentina) Hernán Crespo	26
2001–02	Serie A	34	14	11	9	50	37	53	6th	QF	CL 1st GS	N/A	(Italy) Dino Zoff (Italy) Alberto Zaccheroni	(Argentina) Hernán Crespo	13
2002–03	Serie A	34	15	15	4	57	32	60	4th	SF	UC SF	N/A	(Italy) Roberto Mancini	(Argentina) Claudio López	15
2003–04	Serie A	34	16	8	10	52	38	56	6th	Champions	CL GS	N/A	(Italy) Roberto Mancini	(Italy) Bernardo Corradi	10
2004–05	Serie A	38	11	11	16	48	53	44	10th	R16	UC GS	Runners-up	(Italy) Domenico Caso (Italy) Giuseppe Papadopulo	(Italy) Tommaso Rocchi	13
2005–06	Serie A	38	16	14	8	57	47	32	16th	QF	UIC SF	N/A	(Italy) Delio Rossi	(Italy) Tommaso Rocchi	16
2006–07	Serie A	38	18	11	9	59	33	62	3rd	R3	N/A	N/A	(Italy) Delio Rossi	(Italy) Tommaso Rocchi	16
2007–08	Serie A	38	11	13	14	47	51	46	12th	SF	CL GS	N/A	(Italy) Delio Rossi	(North Macedonia) Goran Pandev (Italy) Tommaso Rocchi	14
2008–09	Serie A	38	15	5	18	46	55	50	10th	Champions	N/A	N/A	(Italy) Delio Rossi	(Italy) Mauro Zárate	13
2009–10	Serie A	38	11	13	14	39	43	46	12th	R16	EL GS	Winners	(Italy) Davide Ballardini (Italy) Edoardo Reja	(Italy) Sergio Floccari	8
2010–11	Serie A	38	20	6	12	55	39	66	5th	R16	N/A	N/A	(Italy) Edoardo Reja	(Brazil) Hernanes	11
2011–12	Serie A	38	18	8	12	56	47	62	4th	QF	EL R32	N/A	(Italy) Edoardo Reja	(Germany) Miroslav Klose	12
2012–13	Serie A	38	18	7	13	51	42	61	7th	Champions	EL QF	N/A	(Switzerland) (Bosnia and Herzegovina) Vladimir Petković	(Germany) Miroslav Klose	15
2013–14	Serie A	38	15	11	12	54	54	56	9th	QF	EL R32	Runners-up	(Switzerland) (Bosnia and Herzegovina) Vladimir Petković (Italy) Edoardo Reja	(Italy) Antonio Candreva	12
2014–15	Serie A	38	21	6	11	71	38	69	3rd	Runners-up	N/A	N/A	(Italy) Stefano Pioli	(Germany) Miroslav Klose	13
2015–16	Serie A	38	15	9	14	52	52	54	8th	QF	CL Play-off; EL R16	Runners-up	(Italy) Stefano Pioli (Italy) Simone Inzaghi	(Italy) Antonio Candreva	10
2016–17	Serie A	38	21	7	10	74	51	70	5th	Runners-up	N/A	N/A	(Argentina) Marcelo Bielsa (Italy) Simone Inzaghi	(Italy) Ciro Immobile	23
2017–18	Serie A	38	21	9	8	89	49	72	5th	SF	EL QF	Winners	(Italy) Simone Inzaghi	(Italy) Ciro Immobile	29
2018–19	Serie A	38	17	8	13	56	46	59	8th	Champions	EL R32	N/A	(Italy) Simone Inzaghi	(Italy) Ciro Immobile	15
2019–20	Serie A	38	24	6	8	79	42	78	4th	QF	EL GS	Winners	(Italy) Simone Inzaghi	(Italy) Ciro Immobile	36
2020–21	Serie A	38	21	5	12	61	55	68	6th	QF	CL R16	N/A	(Italy) Simone Inzaghi	(Italy) Ciro Immobile	20
2021–22	Serie A	38	18	10	10	77	58	64	5th	QF	EL KPO	N/A	(Italy) Maurizio Sarri	(Italy) Ciro Immobile	27
2022–23	Serie A	38	22	8	8	60	30	74	2nd	QF	EL GS; ECL R16	N/A	(Italy) Maurizio Sarri	(Italy) Ciro Immobile	12
2023–24	Serie A	38	18	7	13	49	39	61	7th	SF	CL R16	SF	(Italy) Maurizio Sarri (Italy) Giovanni Martusciello (Croatia) Igor Tudor	(Italy) Ciro Immobile	7
2024–25	Serie A	38	18	11	9	61	49	65	7th	QF	EL QF	N/A	(Italy) Marco Baroni	(Argentina) Taty Castellanos (Spain) Pedro	10
2025–26	Serie A	38	14	12	12	41	40	54	9th	Runners-up	N/A	N/A	(Italy) Maurizio Sarri	(Denmark) Gustav Isaksen (Spain) Pedro	5

- 1. For details of league structure, see Italian football league system.
- 2. The first edition was held in 1922, but the second champions were not crowned until 1936.
- 3. The first edition was held in 1988.
- 4. Only league goals are counted. The Serie A Golden Boot known as Capocannoniere (plural: capocannonieri) is the award given to the highest goalscorer in Serie A.
