= List of SS Lazio managers =

This is a list of all managers of Società Sportiva Lazio.

== List of managers ==
Lazio have had many managers and head coaches throughout their history, below is a chronological list of them from when Serie A was changed into a league format, from 1901 onward.

Manager	Nationality	Years
Bruto Seghettini	(France) (Italy)	1901–02
Sante Ancherani	(Italy)	1902–06
Sante Ancherani; Guido Baccani	(Italy) (Italy)	1906–07
Silvio Mizzi; Guido Baccani	(Malta) (Italy)	1907–08
Guido Baccani	(Italy)	1908–24
Dezső Kőszegi	(Hungary)	1924–26
Jenő Ligeti	(Hungary)	1926–27
Franz Sedlacek	(Austria)	1927–28
Technical Commission	(Italy)	1928–29
Pietro Piselli	(Italy)	1929–30
Ferenc Molnár	(Hungary)	1930–31
Amílcar Barbuy	(Brazil)	1931–32
Karl Stürmer	(Austria)	1932–34
Walter Alt	(Czechoslovakia)	1934–36
József Viola	(Hungary)	1936–39
Luigi Allemandi; Alfredo Di Franco	(Italy) (Argentina)	1939
Géza Kertész	(Hungary)	1939–40
Ferenc Molnár	(Hungary)	1940–41
Dino Canestri	(Italy)	1941
Alexander Popovich	(Austria)	1941–43
Dino Canestri	(Italy)	1943–45
Salvador Gualtieri	(Argentina)	1945–46
Tony Cargnelli	(Austria)	1946–48
Orlando Tognotti	(Italy)	1948
Mario Sperone	(Italy)	1948–51
Giuseppe Bigogno	(Italy)	1951–53
Alfredo Notti	(Italy)	1953
Mario Sperone	(Italy)	1953–54
Federico Allasio	(Italy)	1954
George Raynor; Roberto Copernico	(England) (Italy)	1954–55
Luigi Ferrero; Roberto Copernico	(Italy)	1955–56
Luigi Ferrero; Jesse Carver	(Italy) (England)	1956
Jesse Carver	(England)	1956–57
Milovan Ćirić	(Socialist Federal Republic of Yugoslavia)	1957–58
Alfredo Monza; Dino Canestri	(Italy)	1958
Fulvio Bernardini	(Italy)	1958–60
Enrique Flamini	(Italy) (Argentina)	1960–61
Enrique Flamini; Jesse Carver	(Italy) (Argentina) (England)	1961
Paolo Todeschini	(Italy)	1961–62
Roberto Lovati; Alfonso Ricciardi	(Italy)	1962
Carlo Facchini	(Italy)	1962
Roberto Lovati; Juan Carlos Lorenzo	(Italy) (Argentina)	1962–63

Manager	Nationality	Years
Juan Carlos Lorenzo	(Argentina)	1963–64
Umberto Mannocci	(Italy)	1964–66
Maino Neri	(Italy)	1966–67
Renato Gei	(Italy)	1967–68
Roberto Lovati	(Italy)	1968
Juan Carlos Lorenzo	(Argentina)	1968–69
Roberto Lovati; Juan Carlos Lorenzo	(Italy) (Argentina)	1969–70
Juan Carlos Lorenzo	(Argentina)	1970–71
Roberto Lovati	(Italy)	1971
Tommaso Maestrelli	(Italy)	1971–75
Giulio Corsini	(Italy)	1975
Tommaso Maestrelli	(Italy)	1975–76
Luís Vinício	(Brazil)	1976–78
Roberto Lovati	(Italy)	1978–80
Ilario Castagner	(Italy)	1980–82
Roberto Clagluna	(Italy)	1982–83
Juan Carlos Morrone; Roberto Lovati	(Argentina) (Italy)	1983
Juan Carlos Morrone	(Argentina)	1983
Paolo Carosi	(Italy)	1983–84
Juan Carlos Lorenzo	(Argentina)	1984–85
Giancarlo Oddi; Roberto Lovati	(Italy)	1985
Luigi Simoni	(Italy)	1985–86
Eugenio Fascetti	(Italy)	1986–88
Giuseppe Materazzi	(Italy)	1988–90
Dino Zoff	(Italy)	1990–94
Zdeněk Zeman	(Czech Republic)	1994–97
Dino Zoff	(Italy)	1997
Sven-Göran Eriksson	(Sweden)	1997–2000
Dino Zoff	(Italy)	2001
Alberto Zaccheroni	(Italy)	2001–02
Roberto Mancini	(Italy)	2002–04
Domenico Caso	(Italy)	2004
Giuseppe Papadopulo	(Italy)	2004–05
Delio Rossi	(Italy)	2005–09
Davide Ballardini	(Italy)	2009–10
Edoardo Reja	(Italy)	2010–12
Vladimir Petković	(Bosnia and Herzegovina) (Switzerland)	2012–13
Edoardo Reja	(Italy)	2014
Stefano Pioli	(Italy)	2014–16
Simone Inzaghi	(Italy)	2016
Marcelo Bielsa	(Argentina)	2016
Simone Inzaghi	(Italy)	2016–21
Maurizio Sarri	(Italy)	2021–24
Igor Tudor	(Croatia)	2024
Marco Baroni	(Italy)	2024–2025
Maurizio Sarri	(Italy)	2025–2026
Gennaro Gattuso	(Italy)	2026–present

=== Trophies ===
Managers of Lazio who won at least one trophy during their tenure:

Manager	Period	Trophies
Fulvio Bernardini	1958–1960	Coppa Italia
Juan Carlos Lorenzo	1968–1971	Serie B
Tommaso Maestrelli	1971–1975	Serie A
Sven-Göran Eriksson	1997–2001	2 Coppa Italia, 2 Supercoppa Italiana, Serie A, UEFA Cup Winners' Cup, UEFA Super Cup
Roberto Mancini	2002–2004	Coppa Italia
Delio Rossi	2005–2009	Coppa Italia
Davide Ballardini	2009–2010	Supercoppa Italiana
Vladimir Petković	2012–2013	Coppa Italia
Simone Inzaghi	2016–2021	2 Supercoppa Italiana, Coppa Italia
