= History of SS Lazio =

History of the Italian football club

The history of Società Sportiva Lazio covers over 110 years of the football from the club based in Rome, Italy, established in 1900.

== Foundation and early years ==
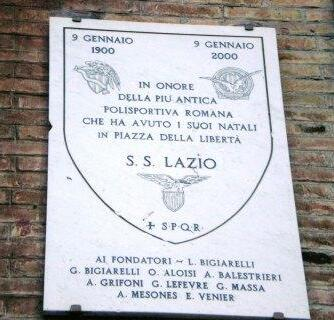
Plaque commemorating the foundation of S.S. Lazio at Piazza della Libertà (Roma, Prati).

Società Podistica Lazio, or Lazio Athletics Club, was founded on 9 January 1900 in the Prati rione of Rome, making it the oldest Roman football team currently active. Wanting to encompass more than just the city of Rome, the club's nine original founding members chose to name the club Lazio, the same name as the region where the city of Rome was built. The primary colour of sky blue was chosen as a tribute to ancient Greece and pays homage to the advent of the modern Olympic Games.

The club's first ever match came in 1902 against Virtus, a match considered, albeit unofficially, the first Rome Derby. That match was played at Piazza d'Armi, near Piazza Mazzini, and Lazio duly won 3–0 with a hat-trick from centre-forward Sante Ancherani.

In 1907, the Italian Football Federation (FIGC) sponsored a Roman championship called I Categoria, which Lazio won, defeating early rivals Virtus in the final. Nonetheless, they were not invited into any national championship despite their success.

After this friendly football activity, Lazio officially gave birth to its football section in 1910 and joined official league competition in 1912 as soon as the FIGC began organising championships in the centre and south of Italy. Lazio reached the national final three times, but never won, losing in 1913 to Pro Vercelli, in 1914 to Casale and in 1923 to Genoa.

When FIGC launched its first full national championship in 1926, Lazio started from the Prima Divisione, the forerunner of present-day Serie B. In 1927, Lazio was the only major Roman club which resisted the fascist regime's attempts to merge all the city's teams into what would become Roma the same year. This in large part thanks to Giorgio Vaccaro, an influential club director who defended the club's right to keep its identity.

== The 1930s: A unified national championship ==
The club played in the first organised Serie A in 1929 and made their league debut on 6 October 1929, defeating Bologna 3–0 at the Rondinella ground on Via Flaminia. However, the inaugural championship was less than brilliant for Lazio, who on the final day managing a meagre 15th-placed finish.

Lazio also had a considerable Brazilian influence in their early Serie A years, known as "Brasilazio". Their coach of the day, Amílcar Barbuy, was the first Brazilian to become involved with Italian football. However, this did not bring them success, as they finished eighth in 1930–31 and 13th in 1931–32.

In the summer of 1932, Barbuy was replaced by an Austrian coach, Karl Stürmer, and he led the club to their first eve win in a Rome Derby, beating the giallorossi 2–1 at home. Two-straight tenth-placed finishes under Stürmer saw him replaced by compatriot Walter Alt in 1934. His arrival also coincided with those of two star players of the day, Silvio Piola and Attilio Ferraris IV. Ferraris had arrived from Roma, where he had played over 200 games, while Piola went on to become a legend of Lazio, the highest goalscorer in Serie A history and, in 1938, he also became a World Cup winner with the Italy national team.

Led by the legendary striker Piola, Lazio achieved a second-place finish in 1937, their highest pre-war result. The coach that season was Hungarian József Viola. They also competed in European competition for the first time, losing in the final of the Central European Cup against Ferencváros.

Lazio rounded out the decade with a memorable away derby win by 2–0 at the Campo Testaccio in 1939 and a solid fourth-placed finish in 1940.

== The 1940s: World War II and mediocrity ==
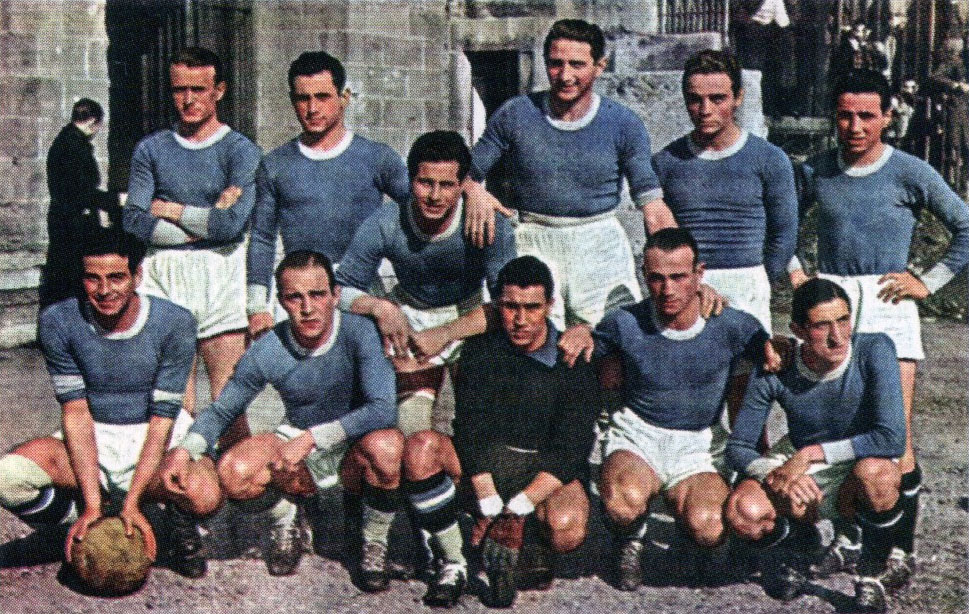
1940–41 Lazio team

This particular decade was dominated by Il Grande Torino, and Lazio could achieve no better than mid-table finishes. The Championship was suspended in 1943 due to the effects of World War II, and the club, now without the national hero Piola, participated in the local Campionato Romano until 1945–46 when the national championship returned, albeit in a regionalised and unofficial format. The following year, the Serie A returned to its usual format and Lazio duly finished tenth, a mediocre season, albeit ahead of Roma, who narrowly avoided relegation.

The 1948–49 season was a difficult one for the biancocelesti, as players were reduced to the minimum wage and several went on strike. They finished 13th, although they recovered the following season to record an impressive fourth-placed finish, made even sweeter by the difficulties of the previous year and the miserable campaign of Roma, who once again narrowly avoided the drop to Serie B.

== The 1950s: The first taste of silverware ==
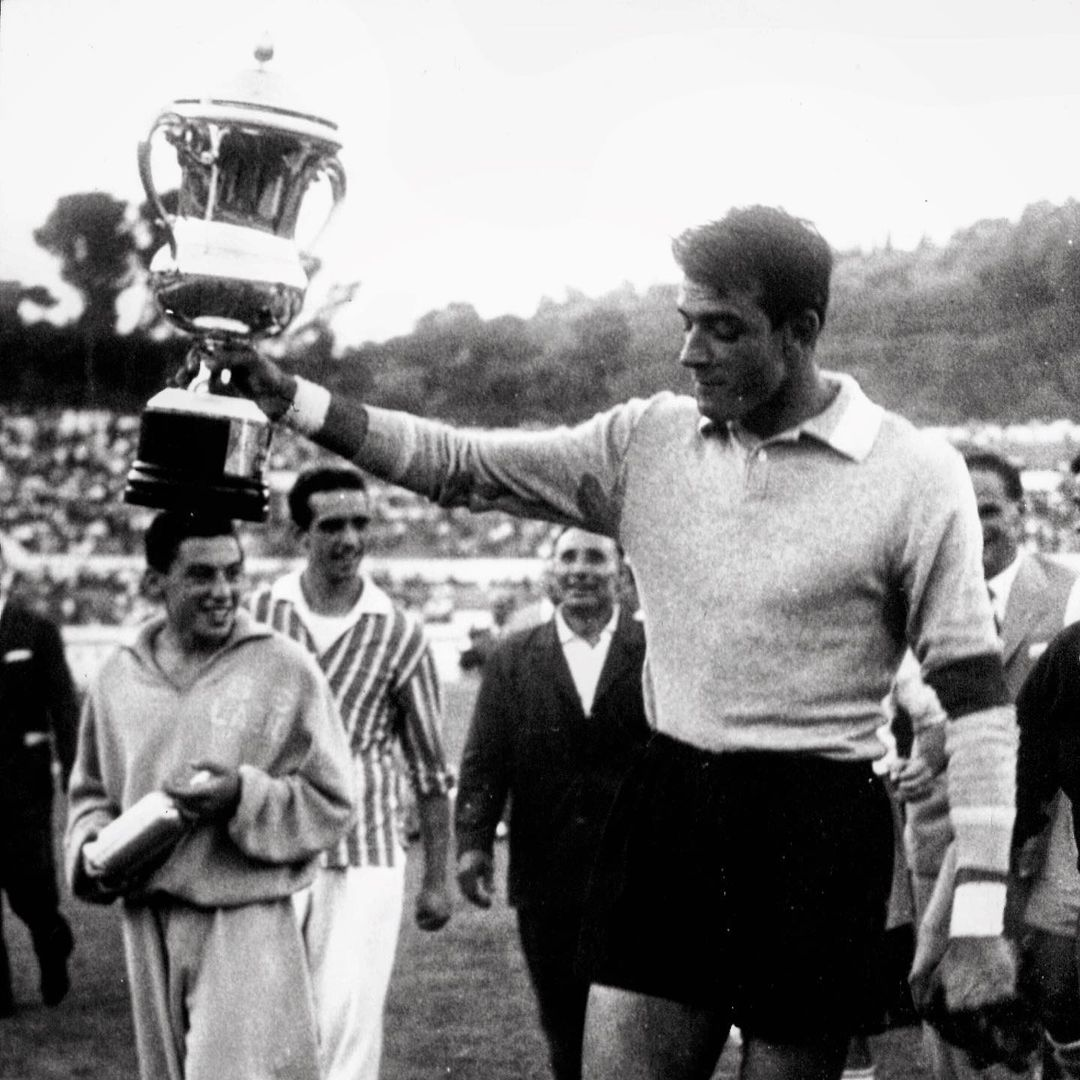
Lazio captain Roberto Lovati raises the 1958 Coppa Italia, the first official trophy in club's history.

Lazio made a return to Europe in 1950, playing in the Latin Cup, then considered the most prestigious continental title. The following season, the aquilotti again played in Europe, this time finishing fourth in the Mitropa Cup. These European campaigns were also complemented with successful domestic campaigns, with two further fourth-placed finishes.

From 1952 to 1955, the club had to endure three poor mid-table finishes, but these were followed by two-straight seasons in which they finished third. The two major signings of this time were Swedish forward Arne Selmosson and Juventus mainstay Ermes Muccinelli.

In 1958, Lazio won its first major piece of silverware, a Coppa Italia. First, the club had topped their group of four, consisting of Palermo, Napoli and rivals Roma, before eliminating Marzotto and Juventus on the road to the final, where they met Fiorentina. Led by coach Fulvio Bernardini, Lazio beat la Viola 1–0 with a goal from striker Maurilio Prini, who had ironically just left Fiorentina.

== The 1960s: The first seasons of Serie B ==
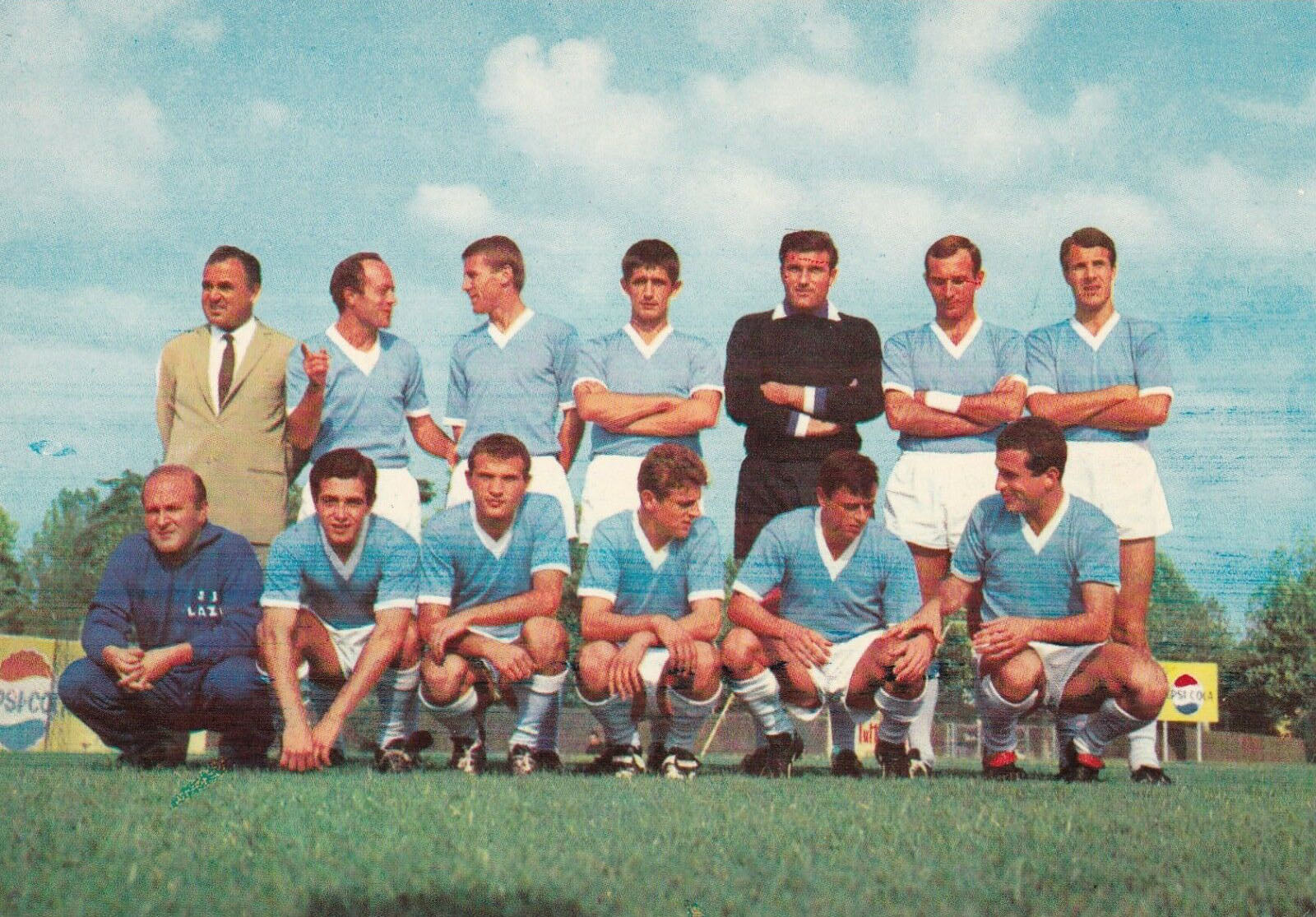
1966–67 Lazio team

The 1960s did not start brightly for Lazio. They finished their 1960–61 campaign in a record-low 18th place (last place) and were relegated alongside Napoli and Bari.

Their first season in Serie B, 1961–62, ended in grave disappointment as they missed out on direct promotion back to the top flight by a one point. The following season made up for that, however, as they were promoted back to Serie A with a third-place finish. Their coach of the day was an Argentine, Juan Carlos Lorenzo, and Lazio's tight defence ensured a credible eighth-place finish in 1964 with a paltry 21 goals scored and a stingy 24 conceded. A 3–0 away win over Juventus was a highlight of the season.

The club was soon hit by a financial crisis, and the presidency of the club was taken up by Umberto Lenzini, an Italian American, who made a significant impact upon the history of the club. Lazio were soon relegated back into Serie B and despite being expected to challenge for promotion, they could only manage a poor 11th place. Juan Carlos Lorenzo returned to the bench which he had left four years earlier, and with some new signings, he led Lazio to win Serie B in 1969. Stars of the side in those years included midfielder Nello Governato, who later went on to work as a manager for the club.

== The 1970s: The first Scudetto ==
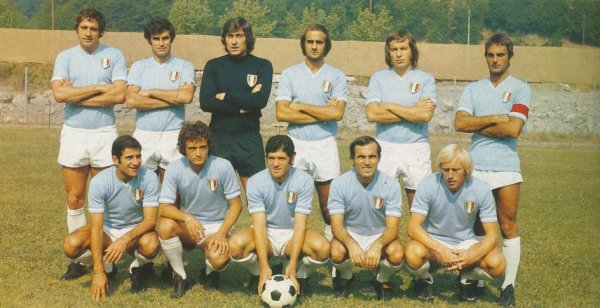
1973–74 Lazio team

The 1970s began just as the 1960s did, with relegation following the 1970–71 season. However, promotion the following year ushered in Lazio's first truly successful period. They took to the field in the 1972–73 season with a team comprising English-born captain Giuseppe Wilson in defence, Luciano Re Cecconi and Mario Frustalupi in midfield, Renzo Garlaschelli and Giorgio Chinaglia up front, and coach Tommaso Maestrelli. With Chinaglia providing the goals and the defence giving little away, Lazio emerged as surprise challengers for the Scudetto to Milan and Juventus in 1972–73, only losing out on the final day of the season after conceding a late goal at Napoli (while Juventus left it late to secure a win at Lazio's bitter rivals Roma). It served as a prelude to a breakthrough for the 1973–74 season, when Lazio would sweep all before them to win their first league title, having led throughout the season.

Unfortunately, this was not built upon, as fourth place the following year would be followed by a struggle against relegation in 1975–76 and a mid-table finish in 1977–78 (with a fifth-place finish in 1976–77 in between). The tragic deaths of Luciano Re Cecconi and scudetto-winning trainer Tommaso Maestrelli, in addition to the departure of Chinaglia in 1976, would be a triple blow for Lazio. The emergence of Bruno Giordano during this period provided some relief as he finished as the Serie A's top scorer in 1979, when Lazio finished eighth.

== The 1980s: The dark years ==
Lazio were forcibly relegated to Serie B in 1980 due to a remarkable scandal concerning illegal bets on their own matches, along with Milan. They remained in Italy's second division for three seasons in what would mark the darkest period in Lazio's history. They would return in 1983 and manage a last-day escape from relegation the following season. The 1984–85 season would prove harrowing, with a pitiful 15 points and bottom-place finish despite the emergence of promising, though albeit unfulfilled, talent of Francesco Dell'Anno and Francesco Fonte.

In 1986, Lazio was hit with a nine-point deduction (a true deathblow back in the day of the two-point win) for a betting scandal involving one player, Claudio Vinazzani. An epic struggle against relegation followed the same season in Serie B, with the club led by trainer Eugenio Fascetti only avoiding relegation to the Serie C after play-off wins over Taranto and Campobasso. This would prove a turning point in the club's history, with Lazio returning to Serie A in 1988 and, under the careful financial management of Gianmarco Calleri, the consolidation of the club's position as a solid top-flight club.

== The 1990s: The Cragnotti era ==
The arrival of Sergio Cragnotti in 1992 changed the club's history forever as he was prepared to invest long term in new players for the club in order to make the team a competitor on the Serie A level. Cragnotti repeatedly broke transfer records in pursuit of players who were considered major stars, including Juan Sebastián Verón for £18 million from Parma, Christian Vieri for £19 million from Atlético Madrid and breaking the world transfer record, albeit only for a matter of weeks, to sign Hernán Crespo – also from Parma – for £35 million.

In 1993, Lazio finished fifth in Serie A, third in 1994, 1995 and 1996, and fourth again in 1997, then it lost the championship just by one point to Milan on the last championship's match in 1999 before, with the likes of Siniša Mihajlović, Alessandro Nesta and Pavel Nedvěd in the side, finally winning its second scudetto in 2000, as well as the Coppa Italia for a "double" with Sven-Göran Eriksson (1997–2001) as manager.

In addition to the 2000 Coppa Italia win, Lazio also won the 1998 edition. Lazio also won the last ever UEFA Cup Winners' Cup in 1999 and reached the UEFA Cup final in 1998, but lost 0–3 against a Ronaldo-inspired Internazionale. Lazio won the Supercoppa Italiana twice and defeated 1999 Champions League winners Manchester United in 1999 to win the UEFA Super Cup. In 2000, Lazio became the first Italian football club to be quoted on the Italian Piazza Affari stock market.

== The 2000s: The Lotito era ==
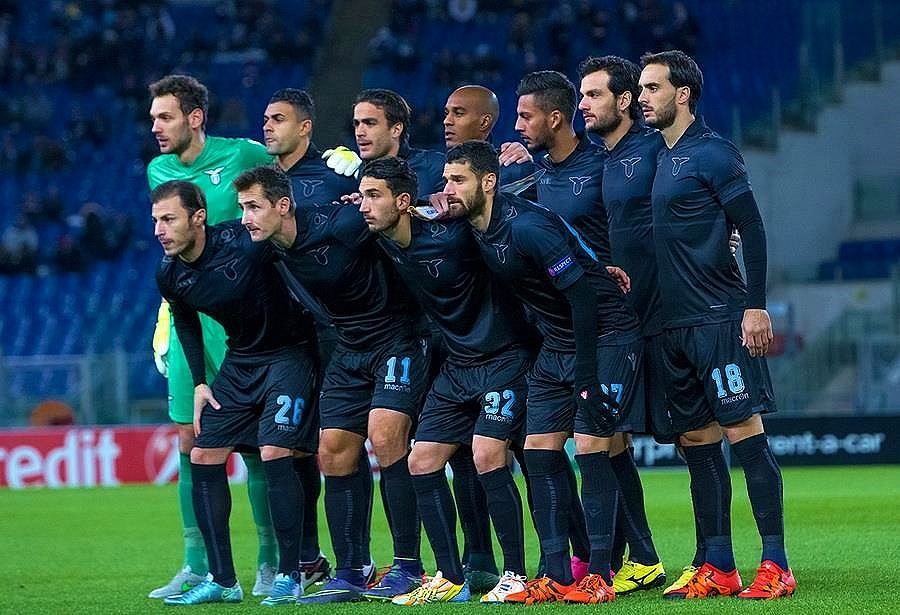
2015–16 Lazio team

Lazio began the decade brightly by winning the Supercoppa Italiana and finishing in third place in the league, but the departure of manager Sven-Göran Eriksson accelerated the decline of the club. With money running out, or wasted on transfer flops such as the Spaniard Gaizka Mendieta for £28 million from Valencia, Lazio missed out on the all-important qualification for the UEFA Champions League in 2001–02, finishing in a disappointing sixth-place.

A financial scandal involving Cragnotti and his food products multinational Cirio forced him to leave the club in 2002, and Lazio was controlled until 2004 by caretaker financial managers and a bank pool. This forced the club to sell their star players and even the "symbol" of the club – club captain Alessandro Nesta – in quick succession. Lazio was subsequently sold to entrepreneur Claudio Lotito, who is the current majority share owner.

That summer, 36-year-old former Lazio star Paolo Di Canio accepted to join the club he supported as a youth, taking a 75% pay cut. The 2005–06 season saw Lazio lose veterans such as Fernando Couto, Paolo Negro and Giuliano Giannichedda who were let go by the club, among other things, to lower its salary expenditure. The 2005–06 season under the coaching of Delio Rossi saw the club compete beyond all expectations with a team which blends remaining veterans such as Angelo Peruzzi and midfield fan favourites Fabio Liverani and Ousmane Dabo with an infusion of motivated players with lower salary demands. The policy had proven successful as the club qualified for the 2006–07 UEFA Cup.

On 14 July, it was announced that they had been relegated to Serie B with a seven-point penalty for their involvement in the Calciopoli scandal. The club's appeal was successful and in a judgment released on 25 July, Lazio's penalty was reduced to an 11-point deduction in the following Serie A season (subsequently further reduced to three points) and a 30-point deduction in the previous Serie A season, resulting in the loss of their qualification to the 2006–07 UEFA Cup. Despite a later-reduced points deduction, Lazio achieved a third-place finish in the 2006–07 Serie A, just falling short of breaking the club record for games won in succession; the current squad racked up eight consecutive wins, compared to the 2000 Scudetto-winning squad which set the record of nine-straight victories.

In the 2007–08 and 2008–09 seasons, Lazio finished in 12th and 10th place respectively, winning the Coppa Italia on 13 May 2009. Lazio started its 2009–10 season contesting the Supercoppa Italiana against Internazionale in Beijing, winning the match 2–1 through goals from Matuzalém and Tommaso Rocchi.

Lazio won the 2012–13 Coppa Italia 1–0 over rivals Roma with the lone goal from Senad Lulić. Lazio won the 2018–19 Coppa Italia 2–0 over Atalanta, winning their seventh title overall.

== See also ==
- List of S.S. Lazio seasons
