= 1986–87 SS Lazio season =

Lazio
1986–87 season
- President: Gianmarco Calleri
- Manager: Eugenio Fascetti
- Serie B: 16th
- Coppa Italia: Round of 16
- Top goalscorer: Giuliano Fiorini (7)
Home colours

SS Lazio finished just above the relegation zone, finishing in 16th in Serie B and reaching the round of 16 in Coppa Italia.

== Squad ==
=== Goalkeepers ===
- (Italy) Mario Ielpo
- (Italy) Giuliano Terraneo

=== Defenders ===
- (Italy) Luca Brunetti
- (Italy) Ernesto Calisti
- (Italy) Daniele Filisetti
- (Italy) Angelo Gregucci
- (Italy) Giorgio Magnocavallo
- (Italy) Raimondo Marino
- (Italy) Massimo Piscedda
- (Italy) Gabriele Podavini

=== Midfielders ===
- (Italy) Antonio Elia Acerbis
- (Italy) Giancarlo Camolese
- (Italy) Domenico Caso
- (Italy) Francesco Dell'Anno
- (Italy) Vincenzo Esposito
- (Italy) Massimo Falessi
- (Italy) Francesco Fonte
- (Italy) Gabriele Pin
- (Italy) Eugenio Sgarbossa

=== Attackers ===
- (Italy) Giuliano Fiorini
- (Italy) Paolo Mandelli
- (Italy) Antonio Piconi
- (Italy) Fabio Poli
- (Italy) Antonio Schillaci

== Competitions ==
=== Serie B ===
==== League table ====
Pos	Team	Pld	W	D	L	GF	GA	GD	Pts	Promotion or relegation
14	Sambenedettese	38	11	12	15	33	37	−4	34	
15	Taranto (O)	38	10	13	15	37	40	−3	33	Qualification to Relegation tie-breaker
16	Lazio (Note: Totonero 1986: 9 points deducted to Lazio) (O)	38	14	14	10	35	28	+7	33	Qualification to Relegation tie-breaker
17	Campobasso (R)	38	9	15	14	34	35	−1	33	Qualification to Relegation tie-breaker
18	Lanerossi Vicenza (R)	38	9	14	15	31	40	−9	32	Relegation to Serie C1

Source: Panini
(O) Play-off winners; (R) Relegated
