= 1985–86 SS Lazio season =

Lazio
1985–86 season
- Manager: Luigi Simoni
- Serie B: 12th
- Coppa Italia: Group Phase
- Top goalscorer: Oliviero Garlini (18)
Home colours

SS Lazio finished 12th in its first Serie B season, staying in the league for another season.

== Squad ==
=== Goalkeepers ===
- (Italy) Mario Ielpo
- (Italy) Astutillo Malgioglio
- (Italy) Gianluca Carlini

=== Defenders ===
- (Italy) Fabio Calcaterra
- (Italy) Ernesto Calisti
- (Italy) Daniele Filisetti
- (Italy) Roberto Galbiati
- (Italy) Massimo Piscedda
- (Italy) Gabriele Podavini
- (Italy) Arcadio Spinozzi

=== Midfielders ===
- (Brazil) Batista
- (Italy) Domenico Caso
- (Italy) Giuseppe Corti
- (Italy) Vincenzo D'Amico
- (Italy) Francesco Dell'Anno
- (Italy) Francesco Fonte
- (Italy) Giorgio Magnocavallo
- (Italy) Fortunato Torrisi
- (Italy) Alessandro Tosi
- (Italy) Claudio Vinazzani

=== Attackers ===
- (Italy) Oscar Damiani
- (Italy) Giuliano Fiorini
- (Italy) Oliviero Garlini
- (Italy) Antonio Piconi
- (Italy) Fabio Poli

== Competitions ==
=== Serie B ===
==== League table ====
Pos	Team	Pld	W	D	L	GF	GA	GD	Pts
9	Campobasso	38	9	19	10	30	36	−6	37
11	Arezzo	38	9	18	11	37	40	−3	36
11	Lazio	38	11	14	13	38	42	−4	36
11	Catania	38	12	12	14	30	37	−7	36
14	Sambenedettese	38	10	15	13	26	26	0	35

Source: Panini
