= 1984–85 SS Lazio season =

Lazio
1984–85 season
- Manager: Paolo Carosi; Juan Carlos Lorenzo; Oddi/Lovati
- Serie A: 15th
- Coppa Italia: Group Phase
- Top goalscorer: Bruno Giordano (5)
Home colours

SS Lazio finished in 15th place, relegated from Serie A.

== Squad ==
=== Goalkeepers ===
- (Italy) Fernando Orsi
- (Italy) Massimo Cacciatori
- (Italy) Nello Cusin

=== Defenders ===
- (Italy) Enrico Calisti
- (Italy) Daniele Filisetti
- (Italy) Lionello Manfredonia
- (Italy) Renato Miele
- (Italy) Gabriele Podavini
- (Italy) Arcadio Spinozzi
- (Italy) Massimo Storgato
- (Italy) Arturo Vianello

=== Midfielders ===
- (Brazil) Batista
- (Italy) Vincenzo D'Amico
- (Italy) Francesco Fonte
- (Italy) Giancarlo Marini
- (Italy) Fortunato Torrisi
- (Italy) Claudio Vinazzani
- (Denmark) Michael Laudrup

=== Attackers ===
- (Italy) Bruno Giordano
- (Italy) Oliviero Garlini
- (Italy) Francesco Dell'Anno
- (Italy) Alessandro Toti

== Competitions ==
=== Serie A ===
==== League table ====
Pos	Team	Pld	W	D	L	GF	GA	GD	Pts	Qualification or relegation
12	Udinese	30	10	5	15	43	46	−3	25	
13	Avellino	30	7	11	12	27	33	−6	25	
14	Ascoli (R)	30	4	14	12	24	40	−16	22	Relegation to Serie B
15	Lazio (R)	30	2	11	17	16	45	−29	15	Relegation to Serie B
16	Cremonese (R)	30	4	7	19	22	48	−26	15	Relegation to Serie B

Source: RSSSF.com
Rules for classification: 1) Points; 2) Head-to-head points; 3) Head-to-head goal difference; 4) Goal difference; 5) Goals scored; 6) Draw. (Note: Head-to-head record is used only after all the matches between the teams in question have been played).
(R) Relegated

==== Matches ====
16 September 1984 1	Lazio	0–1	Fiorentina	Rome
		Report	Pecci 71'	Stadium: Olimpico; Referee: Claudio Peri (Genoa)

23 September 1984 2	Udinese	5–0	Lazio	Udine
	Galparoli 28'; Zico 36'; Selvaggi 58'; Mauro 68'; Carnevale 88'	Report		Stadium: Friuli; Referee: Tullio Lanese (Messina)

30 September 1984 3	Lazio	1–1	Internazionale	Rome
	Giordano 27'	Report	Altobelli 33'	Stadium: Olimpico

7 October 1984 4	Ascoli	0–0	Lazio	Ascoli Piceno
		Report		Stadium: Cino e Lillo Del Duca; Referee: Arcangelo Pezzella (Frattamaggiore)

14 October 1984 5	Lazio	1–1	Napoli	Rome
	D'Amico 35'	Report	Maradona 51'	Stadium: Olimpico; Referee: Paolo Casarin (Milan)

21 October 1984 6	Torino	1–0	Lazio	Turin
	Leo Junior 77'	Report		Stadium: Comunale; Referee: Claudio Pieri (Genoa)

28 October 1984 7	Lazio	2–1	Cremonese	Rome
	Borin 56'og D'Amico 82'	Report	Vigano 51'	Stadium: Olimpico; Referee: Pietro D'Elia (Salerno)

11 November 1984 8	Roma	0–0	Lazio	Rome
		Report		Stadium: Olimpico; Referee: Paolo Bergamo (Livorno)

18 November 1984 9	Atalanta	1–0	Lazio	Bergamo
	Pacione 85'	Report		Stadium: Comunale; Referee: Maurizio Mattei (Macerata)

25 November 1984 10	Lazio	3–2	Como	Rome
	Vianello 6'; Giuliani 38'og Laudrup 76'	Report	Batista 28'og Centi 86'	Stadium: Olimpico; Referee: Pierluigi Pairetto (Turin)

2 December 1984 11	Sampdoria	2–2	Lazio	Genoa
	Mancini 3'; Salsano 19'	Report	Calisti 78'; Batista 83'	Stadium: Luigi Ferraris; Referee: Tullio Lanese (Messina)

16 December 1984 12	Lazio	0–1	Hellas Verona	Rome
		Report	Podavini 60'og	Stadium: Olimpico; Referee: Claudio Peri (Genoa)

23 December 1984 13	Avellino	1–0	Lazio	Avellino
	Filisetti 74'og	Report		Stadium: Partenio; Referee: Pierluigi Pairetto (Turin)

7 January 1985 14	Lazio	0–1	Milan	Rome
		Report	Virdis 21'	Stadium: Olimpico; Referee: Luigi Agnolin (Bassano del Grappa)

20 January 1985 16	Fiorentina	3–0	Lazio	Florence
	Socrates 13'; Pellegrini 68'; Monelli 90'	Report		Stadium: Comunale; Referee: Pietro D'Elia (Salerno)

27 January 1985 17	Lazio	1–4	Udinese	Rome
	Giordano 77'pen	Report	Edinho 35'; Carnevale 42'; Gerolin 68'; Selvaggi 87'	Stadium: Olimpico; Referee: Egidio Ballerini (La Spezia)

30 January 1985 15	Juventus	1–0	Lazio	Turin
	Platini 70'	Report		Stadium: Comunale; Referee: Claudio Pieri (Genoa)

10 February 1985 18	Internazionale	1–0	Lazio	Milan
	Marini 84'	Report		Stadium: Giuseppe Meazza; Referee: Tullio Lanese (Messina)

17 February 1985 19	Lazio	0–0	Ascoli	Rome
		Report		Stadium: Olimpico; Referee: Giancarlo Redini (Pisa)

24 February 1985 20	Napoli	4–0	Lazio	Naples
	Maradona 58'; Filisetti 78'og Maradona 84'; Maradona	Report		Stadium: San Paolo; Referee: Claudio Pieri (Genoa)

3 March 1985 21	Lazio	0–0	Torino	Rome
		Report		Stadium: Olimpico; Referee: Pietro D'Elia (Salerno)

17 March 1985 22	Cremonese	1–1	Lazio	Cremona
	Żmuda 66'	Report	Oliviero Garlini 2'	Stadium: Giovanni Zini; Referee: Carlo Sguizzato (Verona)

24 March 1985 23	Lazio	1–1	Roma	Rome
	Giordano 73'	Report	Antonelli 71'	Stadium: Olimpico; Referee: Pietro D'Elia (Salerno)

31 March 1985 24	Lazio	1–1	Atalanta	Rome
	Fonte 45'	Report	Magrin 2'	Stadium: Olimpico; Referee: Romeo Paparesta (Bari)

14 April 1985 25	Como	1–0	Lazio	Como
	Morbiducci 53'	Report		Stadium: Giuseppe Sinigaglia; Referee: Paolo Bergamo (Livorno)

21 April 1985 26	Lazio	0–3	Sampdoria	Rome
			Scanziani 23'; Salsano 45'; Vierchowod 54'	Stadium: Olimpico; Referee: Maurizio Mattei (Macerata)

28 April 1985 27	Hellas Verona	1–0	Lazio	Verona
	Fanna 78'	Report		Stadium: Marcantonio Bentegodi; Referee: Paolo Casarin (Milan)

5 May 1985 28	Lazio	0–1	Avellino	Rome
		Report	Colomba 87'	Stadium: Olimpico; Referee: Giancarlo Redini (Pisa)

12 May 1985 29	Milan	2–0	Lazio	Milan
	Virdis 16'; Battistini 40'	Report		Stadium: San Siro; Referee: Luciano Luci (Firenze)

19 May 1985 30	Lazio	3–3	Juventus	Rome
	Giordano 3'; Giordano 68'pen Podavini 74'	Report	Platini 12'; Brio 34'; Scirea 61'	Stadium: Olimpico; Referee: Pier Luigi Magni (Bergamo)

=== Coppa Italia ===
Group 3

Team	G	W	D	L	P	GF	GA	DR
Roma	8	5	3	2	0	8	2	+6
Genoa	6	5	2	2	1	7	4	+3
S.S. Lazio	6	5	2	2	1	8	6	+2
Varese	5	5	0	5	0	2	2	0
Padova	4	5	1	2	2	3	5	-2
Pistoiese	1	5	0	1	4	1	10	-9

Genoa qualified to Eightfinals due to better Goal Difference.
