= List of Serie A winning managers =

This is a list of Serie A winning football managers. Serie A is the men's top professional football division of the Italian football league system. Prior to 1930, it was known by other names, such as Divisione Nazionale.

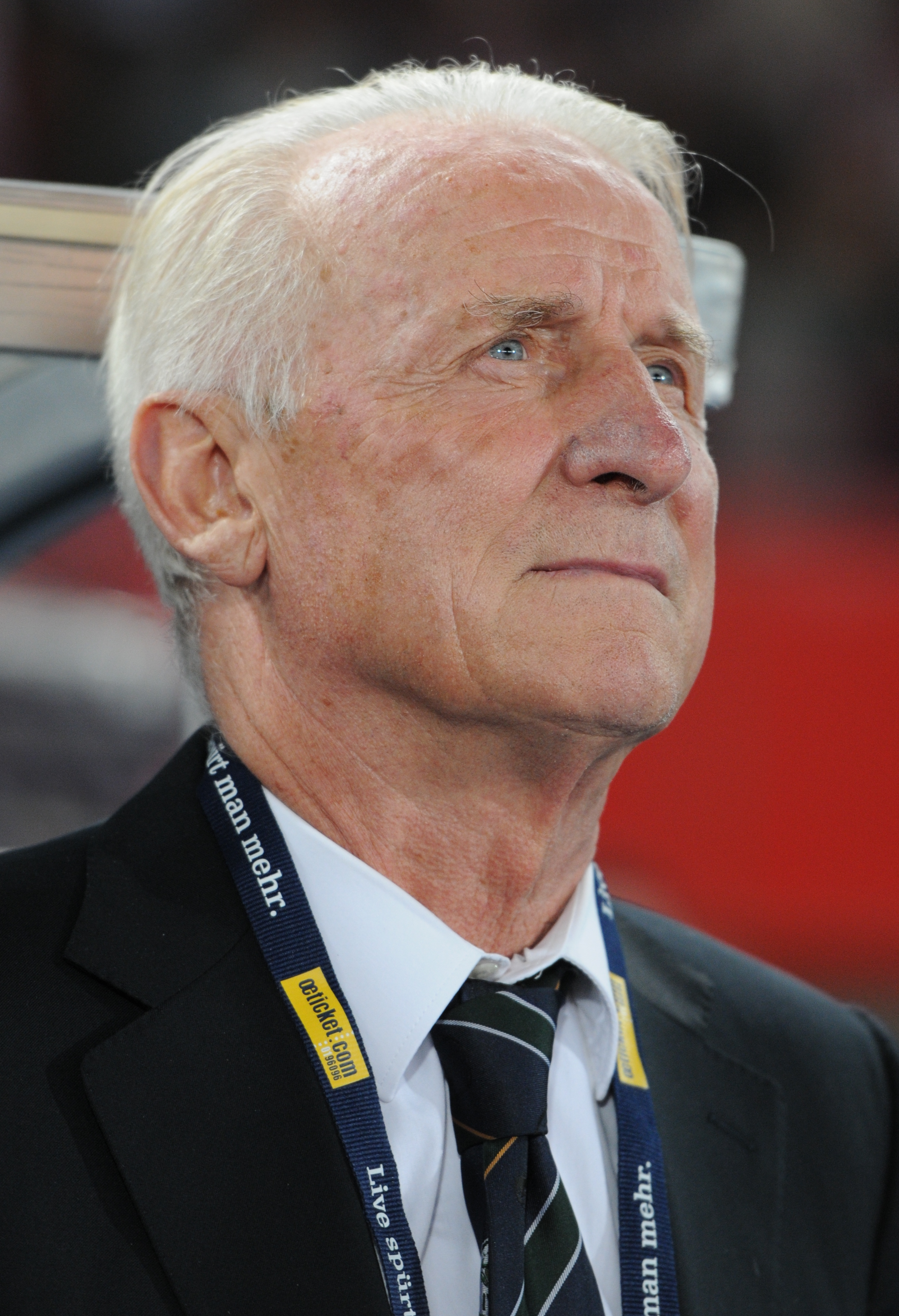
Giovanni Trapattoni has won Serie A seven times (with two clubs), more than any other manager.

== Seasons and winning managers ==
| Season | Manager | Nationality | Club | Ref. |
|---|---|---|---|---|
| 1929–30 | Árpád Weisz | Hungary | Ambrosiana-Inter | |
| 1930–31 | Carlo Carcano | Italy | Juventus | |
| 1931–32 | Carlo Carcano | Italy | Juventus | |
| 1932–33 | Carlo Carcano | Italy | Juventus | |
| 1933–34 | Carlo Carcano | Italy | Juventus | |
| 1934–35 | Carlo Bigatto | Italy | Juventus | |
| 1935–36 | Árpád Weisz | Hungary | Bologna | |
| 1936–37 | Árpád Weisz | Hungary | Bologna | |
| 1937–38 | Armando Castellazzi | Italy | Ambrosiana-Inter | |
| 1938–39 | Hermann Felsner | Austria | Bologna | |
| 1939–40 | Giuseppe Peruchetti | Italy | Ambrosiana-Inter | |
| 1940–41 | Hermann Felsner | Austria | Bologna | |
| 1941–42 | Alfréd Schaffer | Hungary | Roma | |
| 1942–43 | András Kuttik | Hungary | Torino | |
| 1943–44 | Cancelled due to World War II | | | |
| 1944–45 | Cancelled due to World War II | | | |
| 1945–46 | Luigi Ferrero | Italy | Torino | |
| 1946–47 | Luigi Ferrero | Italy | Torino | |
| 1947–48 | Mario Sperone | Italy | Torino | |
| 1948–49 | Leslie Lievesley | England | Torino | |
| 1949–50 | Jesse Carver | England | Juventus | |
| 1950–51 | Lajos Czeizler | Hungary | Milan | |
| 1951–52 | György Sárosi | Hungary | Juventus | |
| 1952–53 | Alfredo Foni | Italy | Inter | |
| 1953–54 | Alfredo Foni | Italy | Inter | |
| 1954–55 | Ettore Puricelli | Italy | Milan | |
| 1955–56 | Fulvio Bernardini | Italy | Fiorentina | |
| 1956–57 | Giuseppe Viani | Italy | Milan | |
| 1957–58 | Ljubiša Broćić | Yugoslavia | Juventus | |
| 1958–59 | Giuseppe Viani | Italy | Milan | |
| 1959–60 | Carlo Parola | Italy | Juventus | (Note: Carlo Parola was the manager for these seasons while Renato Cesarini was the technical director, as shown here and here.) |
| 1960–61 | Carlo Parola | Italy | Juventus | |
| 1961–62 | Nereo Rocco | Italy | Milan | |
| 1962–63 | Helenio Herrera | Argentina | Inter | |
| 1963–64 | Fulvio Bernardini | Italy | Bologna | |
| 1964–65 | Helenio Herrera | Argentina | Inter | |
| 1965–66 | Helenio Herrera | Argentina | Inter | |
| 1966–67 | Heriberto Herrera | Paraguay | Juventus | |
| 1967–68 | Nereo Rocco | Italy | Milan | |
| 1968–69 | Bruno Pesaola | Italy | Fiorentina | |
| 1969–70 | Manlio Scopigno | Italy | Cagliari | |
| 1970–71 | Giovanni Invernizzi | Italy | Inter | |
| 1971–72 | Čestmír Vycpálek | Czech Republic | Juventus | |
| 1972–73 | Čestmír Vycpálek | Czech Republic | Juventus | |
| 1973–74 | Tommaso Maestrelli | Italy | Lazio | |
| 1974–75 | Carlo Parola | Italy | Juventus | |
| 1975–76 | Luigi Radice | Italy | Torino | |
| 1976–77 | Giovanni Trapattoni | Italy | Juventus | |
| 1977–78 | Giovanni Trapattoni | Italy | Juventus | |
| 1978–79 | Nils Liedholm | Sweden | Milan | |
| 1979–80 | Eugenio Bersellini | Italy | Inter | |
| 1980–81 | Giovanni Trapattoni | Italy | Juventus | |
| 1981–82 | Giovanni Trapattoni | Italy | Juventus | |
| 1982–83 | Nils Liedholm | Sweden | Roma | |
| 1983–84 | Giovanni Trapattoni | Italy | Juventus | |
| 1984–85 | Osvaldo Bagnoli | Italy | Hellas Verona | |
| 1985–86 | Giovanni Trapattoni | Italy | Juventus | |
| 1986–87 | Ottavio Bianchi | Italy | Napoli | |
| 1987–88 | Arrigo Sacchi | Italy | Milan | |
| 1988–89 | Giovanni Trapattoni | Italy | Inter | |
| 1989–90 | Alberto Bigon | Italy | Napoli | |
| 1990–91 | Vujadin Boškov | Yugoslavia | Sampdoria | |
| 1991–92 | Fabio Capello | Italy | Milan | |
| 1992–93 | Fabio Capello | Italy | Milan | |
| 1993–94 | Fabio Capello | Italy | Milan | |
| 1994–95 | Marcello Lippi | Italy | Juventus | |
| 1995–96 | Fabio Capello | Italy | Milan | |
| 1996–97 | Marcello Lippi | Italy | Juventus | |
| 1997–98 | Marcello Lippi | Italy | Juventus | |
| 1998–99 | Alberto Zaccheroni | Italy | Milan | |
| 1999–2000 | Sven-Göran Eriksson | Sweden | Lazio | |
| 2000–01 | Fabio Capello | Italy | Roma | |
| 2001–02 | Marcello Lippi | Italy | Juventus | |
| 2002–03 | Marcello Lippi | Italy | Juventus | |
| 2003–04 | Carlo Ancelotti | Italy | Milan | |
| 2004–05 | Stripped from Juventus | | | |
| 2005–06 | Roberto Mancini | Italy | Inter | |
| 2006–07 | Roberto Mancini | Italy | Inter | |
| 2007–08 | Roberto Mancini | Italy | Inter | |
| 2008–09 | José Mourinho | Portugal | Inter | |
| 2009–10 | José Mourinho | Portugal | Inter | |
| 2010–11 | Massimiliano Allegri | Italy | Milan | |
| 2011–12 | Antonio Conte | Italy | Juventus | |
| 2012–13 | Antonio Conte | Italy | Juventus | |
| 2013–14 | Antonio Conte | Italy | Juventus | |
| 2014–15 | Massimiliano Allegri | Italy | Juventus | |
| 2015–16 | Massimiliano Allegri | Italy | Juventus | |
| 2016–17 | Massimiliano Allegri | Italy | Juventus | |
| 2017–18 | Massimiliano Allegri | Italy | Juventus | |
| 2018–19 | Massimiliano Allegri | Italy | Juventus | |
| 2019–20 | Maurizio Sarri | Italy | Juventus | |
| 2020–21 | Antonio Conte | Italy | Inter | |
| 2021–22 | Stefano Pioli | Italy | Milan | |
| 2022–23 | Luciano Spalletti | Italy | Napoli | |
| 2023–24 | Simone Inzaghi | Italy | Inter | |
| 2024–25 | Antonio Conte | Italy | Napoli | |
| 2025–26 | Cristian Chivu | Romania | Inter | |

== Most wins by individual ==
| Rank | Manager | Wins | Club(s) | Winning seasons |
|---|---|---|---|---|
| 1 | (Italy) Giovanni Trapattoni | 7 | Juventus, Inter | 1976–77, 1977–78, 1980–81, 1981–82, 1983–84, 1985–86, 1988–89 |
| 2 | (Italy) Massimiliano Allegri | 6 | Milan, Juventus | 2010–11, 2014–15, 2015–16, 2016–17, 2017–18, 2018–19 |
| 3 | (Italy) Fabio Capello | 5 | Milan, Roma | 1991–92, 1992–93, 1993–94, 1995–96, 2000–01 |
| 3 | (Italy) Marcello Lippi | 5 | Juventus | 1994–95, 1996–97, 1997–98, 2001–02, 2002–03 |
| 3 | (Italy) Antonio Conte | 5 | Juventus, Inter, Napoli | 2011–12, 2012–13, 2013–14, 2020–21, 2024–25 |
| 6 | (Italy) Carlo Carcano | 4 | Juventus | 1930–31, 1931–32, 1932–33, 1933–34 |
| 7 | (Argentina) Helenio Herrera | 3 | Inter | 1962–63, 1964–65, 1965–66 |
| 7 | (Italy) Roberto Mancini | 3 | Inter | 2005–06, 2006–07, 2007–08 |
| 7 | (Italy) Carlo Parola | 3 | Juventus | 1959–60, 1960–61, 1974–75 |
| 7 | (Hungary) Árpád Weisz | 3 | Ambrosiana-Inter, Bologna | 1929–30, 1935–36, 1936–37 |

== See also ==
- List of Italian football champions
- Serie A Coach of the Year
- List of English football championship winning managers
- List of La Liga winning managers
- List of Ligue 1 winning managers
