= Alexandru Popovici =

Alexandru Popovici may refer to:

- Alexandru Popovici (Moldovan footballer), Moldovan footballer
- Alexandru Adrian Popovici, Romanian footballer
- Alexandru Popovici (biologist)
- Alexandru Popovici (archaeologist)

== See also ==
- Alexander Popovich, Austrian footballer
- Alex Popović, Australian soccer player
