= Franz Sedlacek =

Austrian painter

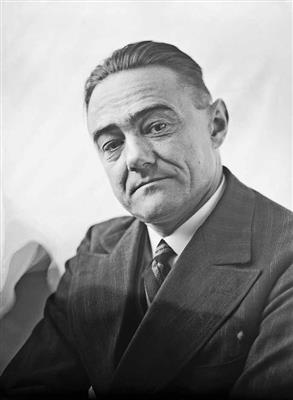
- Born: 21 January 1891; Breslau, Germany
- Died: 1945 (aged 53–54); Toruń, Poland
- Known for: Painter
- Notable work: Lied in der Dämmerung (Song in the Twilight)
- Movement: Symbolism

Franz Sedlacek (21 January 1891 – 1945) was an Austrian painter who belonged to the tradition known as "New Objectivity" ("neue Sachlichkeit"), an artistic movement similar to Magical Realism. At the end of the Second World War he "disappeared" as a soldier of the Wehrmacht near Toruń, Poland. He was declared missing on February 1, 1945 and pronounced dead in 1972.

== Biography ==
Franz Sedlacek was born in Breslau on 21 January 1891, and moved with his family to Linz in 1897. In 1909 he graduated from the Royal High School at the Fadingerstraße. A year later, he moved to Vienna and studied architecture and chemistry. After serving in World War I, he completed his studies and in 1921 began working at the Technical Museum of Vienna.

In 1923, Sedlacek married Maria Albrecht. The couple raised two daughters.

Sedlacek joined the Wehrmacht in 1939, fighting in Russia, Norway and Poland. He went missing during the battle for the Toruń Fortress.

== Work ==
In 1913, Sedlacek founded an artistic association in Linz with Anton Lutz, Klemens Brosch and Heinz Bitzan. Sedlacek began as a graphic artist, and later turned to oil painting.

In 1925 he produced a number of watercolours for Claire Annabel Caroline Grant Duff's Book The Unicorn.

In 1927, Sedlacek joined the Viennese Secession, an association of artists that was founded by Gustav Klimt and others in 1897.

In 1930, Sedlacek's work was included in an exhibition of Austrian art at the Museum of Modern Art in New York. He was subsequently awarded the Austrian State Prize for painting thrice: in 1933, 1935 and 1937.

A collection of his works is on exhibition at the Leopold Museum in the Museumsquartier in Vienna, Austria, including the 1931 painting, "Lied in der Dämmerung" ("Song in the Twilight"), as well as in the Albertina Museum. Also "Sturm" (Storm) 1932 in the Belvedere Museum Vienna.

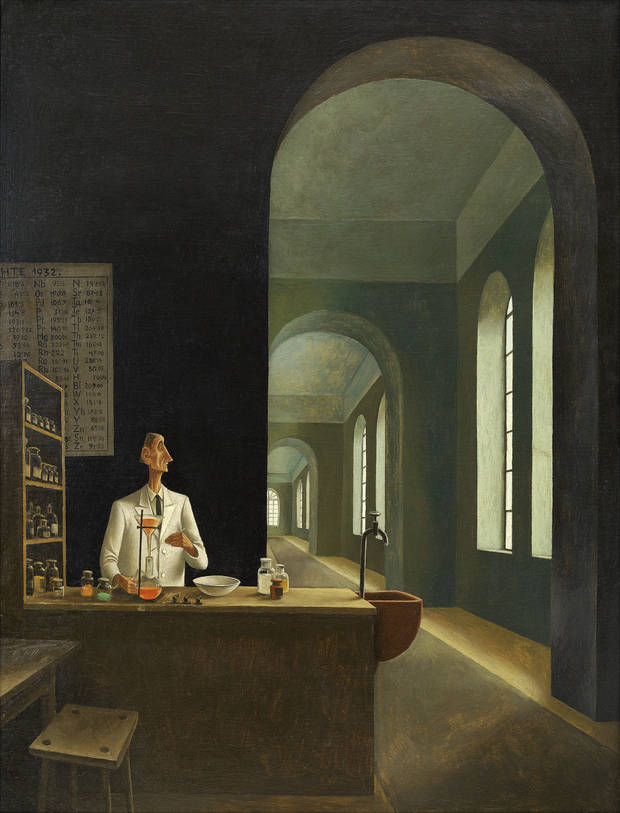
"The Chemist"
(1932, self-portrait)

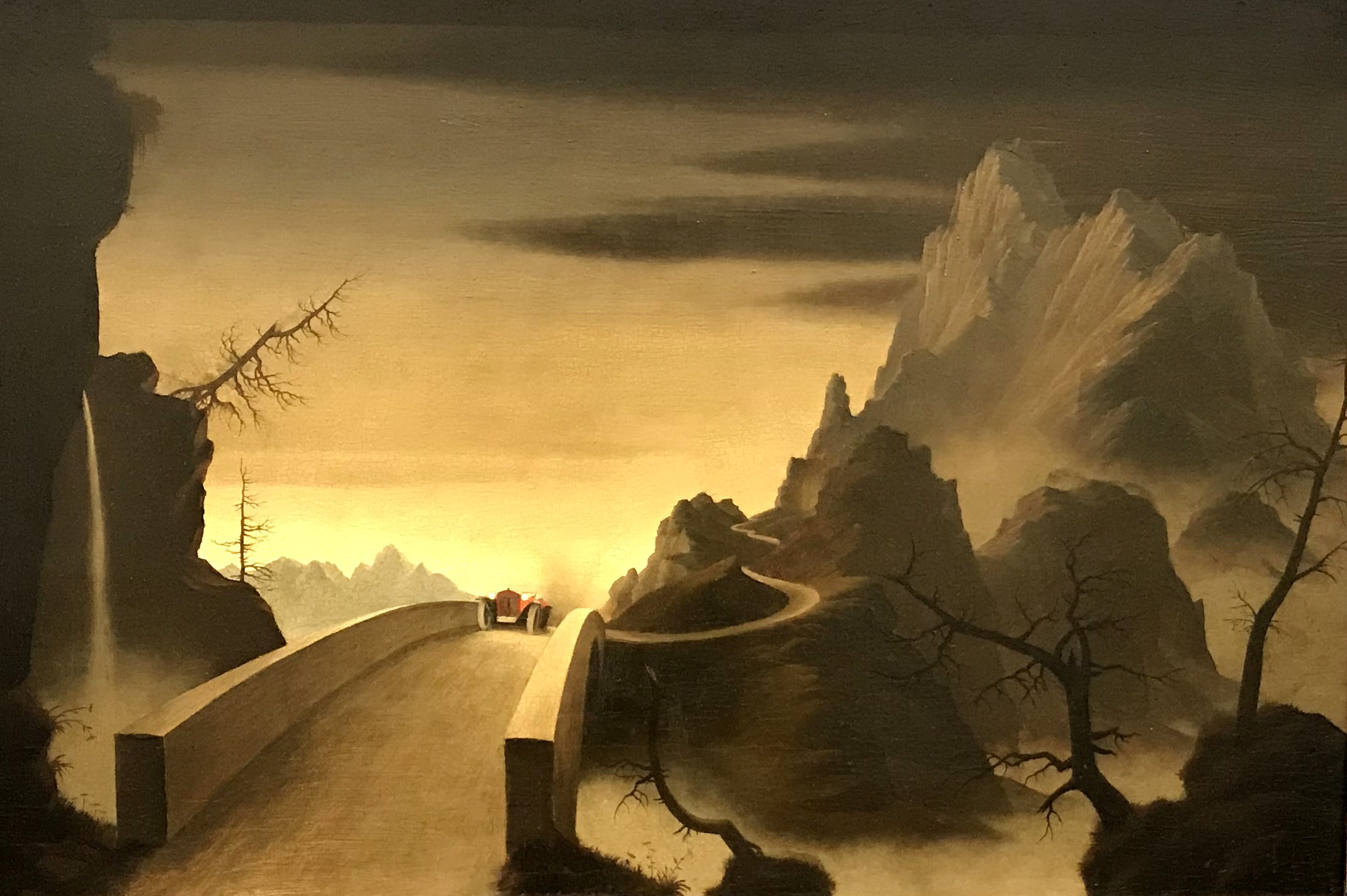
"Mountain Landscape with Automobile" (1931)

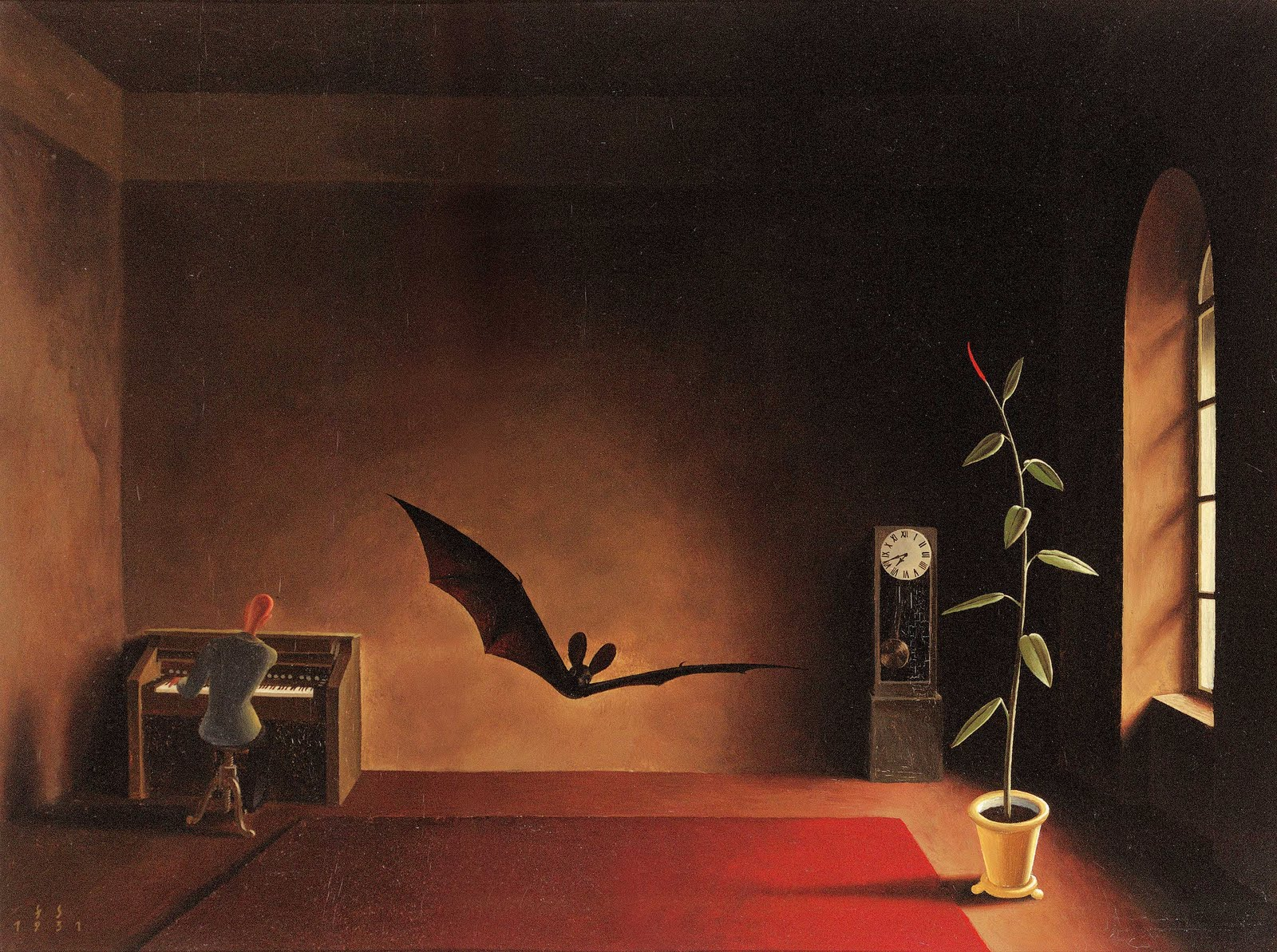
"Song in the Twilight" (1931)

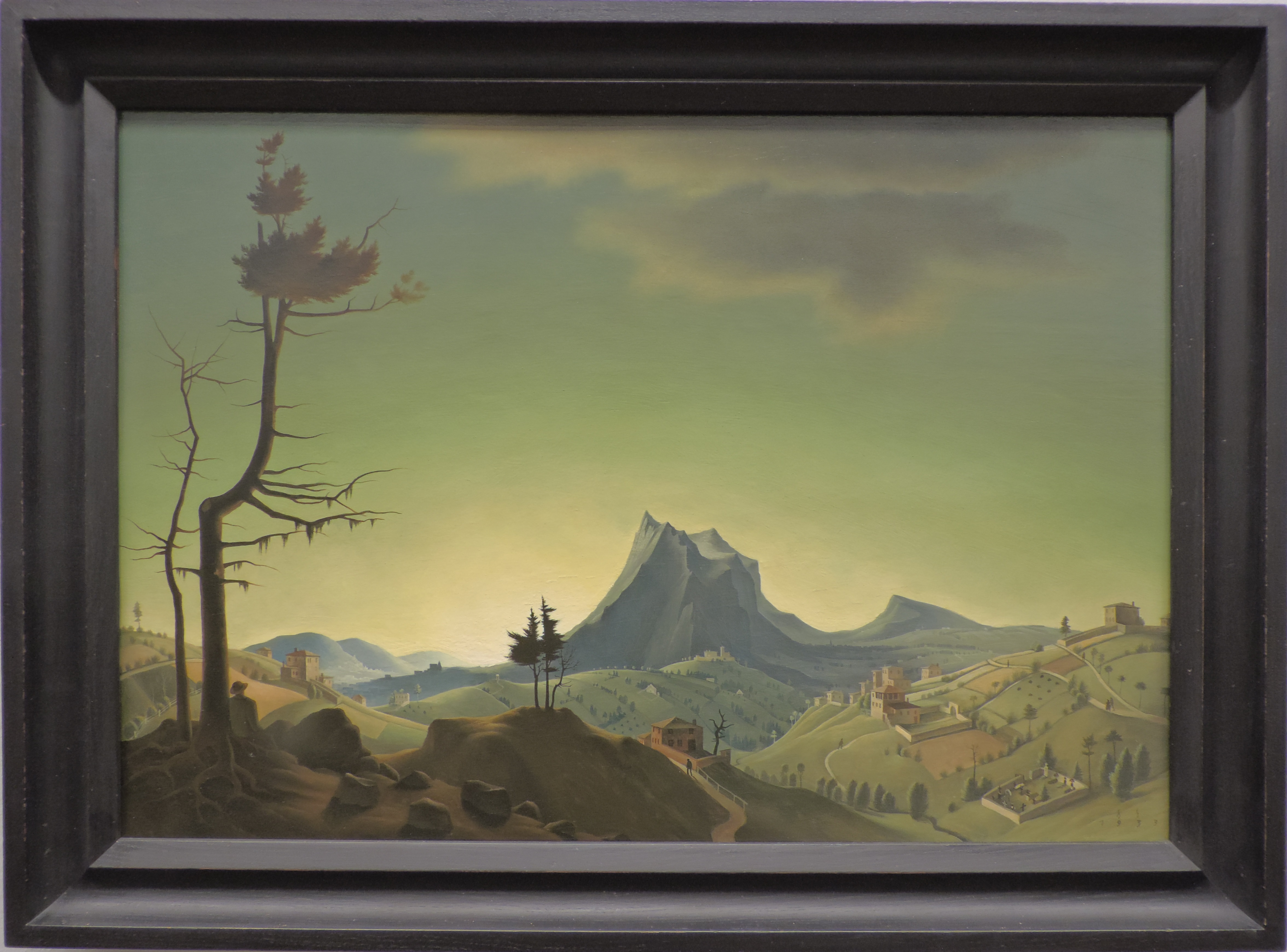
"Evening Landscape" (1933)

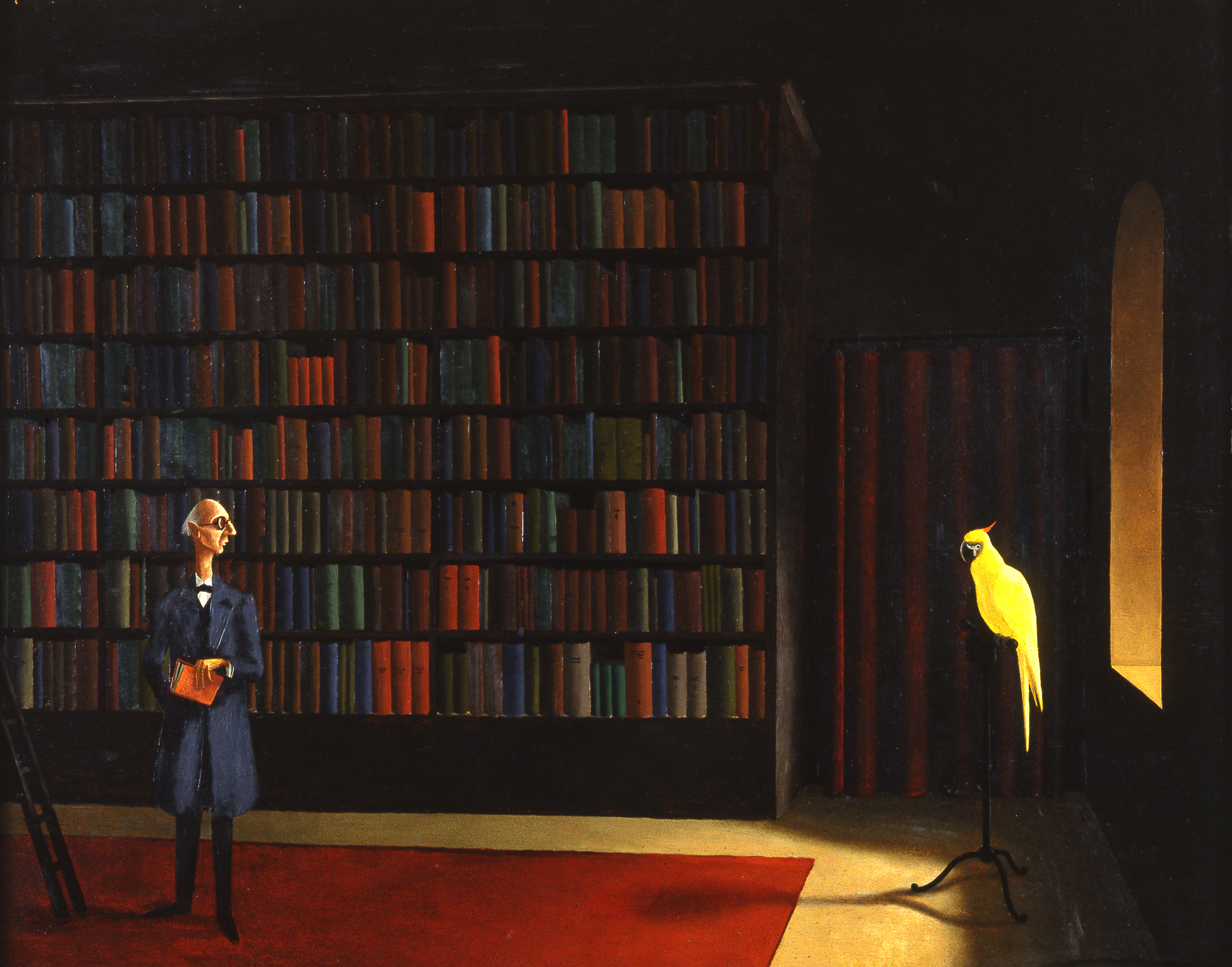
"The Library" (before 1939)

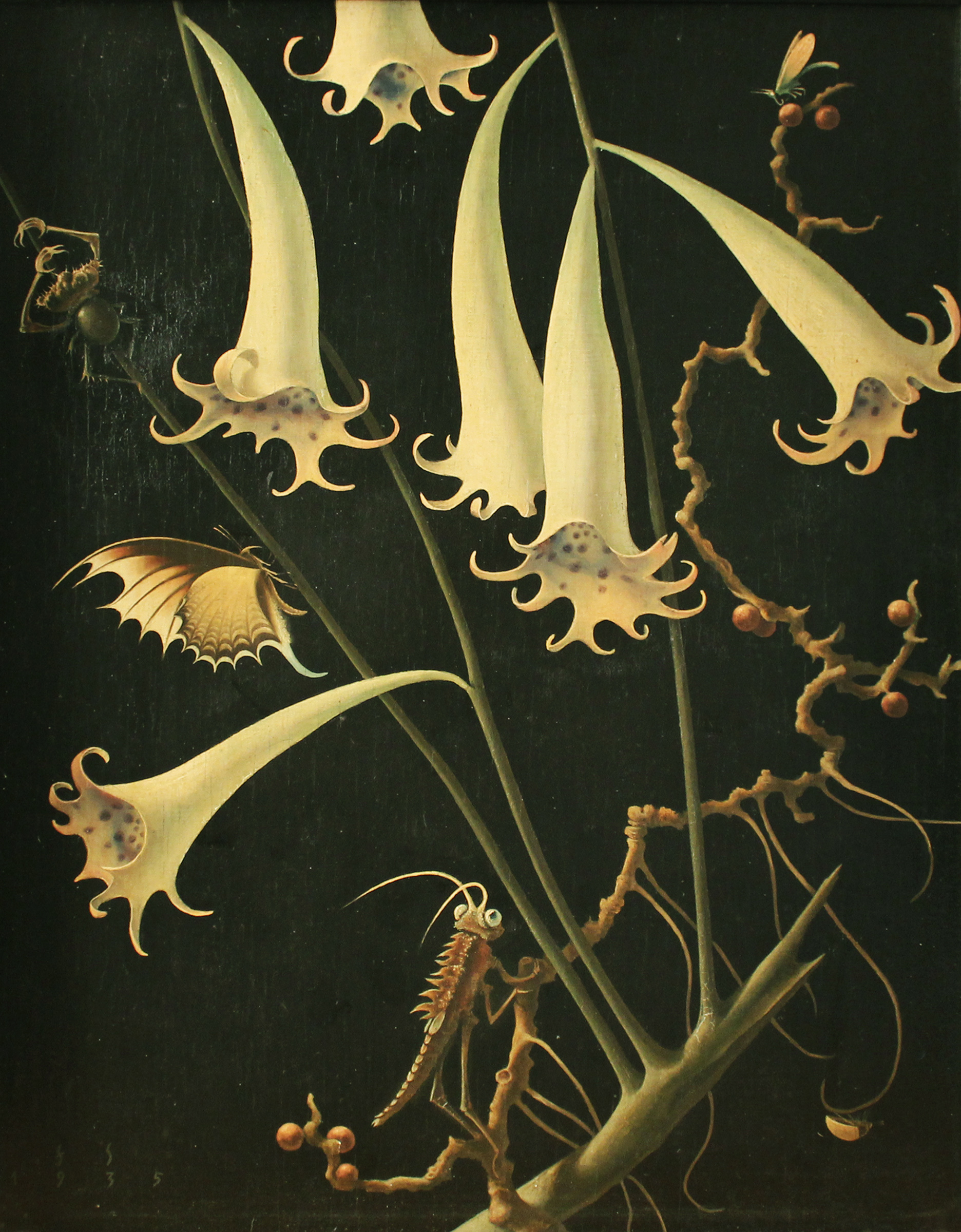
"Flowers and Insects" (before 1939)
