= 1986–87 Serie B =

Italian football league season

Serie B
- Season: 1986–87
- Champions: Pescara; Pisa shared title

Serie B 1986-87 team distribution

The Serie B 1986–87 was the fifty-fifth tournament of this competition played in Italy since its creation.

== Teams ==
Parma, Modena, Messina and Taranto had been promoted from Serie C, while Pisa, Bari and Lecce had been relegated from Serie A.

== Events ==
Tiebreakers were restored in relegation zone.

== Final classification ==
Pos	Team	Pld	W	D	L	GF	GA	GD	Pts	Promotion or relegation
1	Pescara (C, P)	38	16	12	10	43	33	+10	44	Promotion to Serie A
1	Pisa (C, P)	38	16	12	10	42	32	+10	44	Promotion to Serie A
3	Cesena (O, P)	38	15	13	10	38	29	+9	43	Qualification to Promotion tie-breaker
4	Lecce (Q)	38	15	13	10	38	32	+6	43	Qualification to Promotion tie-breaker
5	Cremonese (Q)	38	14	15	9	35	29	+6	43	Qualification to Promotion tie-breaker
6	Genoa	38	12	18	8	44	39	+5	42	
7	Parma	38	11	18	9	30	26	+4	40	
7	Messina	38	12	16	10	29	28	+1	40	
9	Bari	38	11	17	10	33	32	+1	39	
10	Bologna	38	10	16	12	40	38	+2	36	
11	Triestina (Note: Totonero 1986: 4 points deducted to Triestina)	38	10	19	9	31	26	+5	35	
11	Arezzo	38	7	21	10	30	33	−3	35	
11	Modena	38	10	15	13	32	50	−18	35	
14	Sambenedettese	38	11	12	15	33	37	−4	34	
15	Taranto (O)	38	10	13	15	37	40	−3	33	Qualification to Relegation tie-breaker
16	Lazio (Note: Totonero 1986: 9 points deducted to Lazio) (O)	38	14	14	10	35	28	+7	33	Qualification to Relegation tie-breaker
17	Campobasso (R)	38	9	15	14	34	35	−1	33	Qualification to Relegation tie-breaker
18	Lanerossi Vicenza (R)	38	9	14	15	31	40	−9	32	Relegation to Serie C1
18	Catania (R)	38	8	16	14	25	38	−13	32	Relegation to Serie C1
20	Cagliari (Note: Totonero 1986: 5 points deducted to Cagliari) (R)	38	9	13	16	32	47	−15	26	Relegation to Serie C1

Source: Panini
(C) Champions; (O) Play-off winners; (P) Promoted; (Q) Qualified for the phase indicated; (R) Relegated

== Results ==
Home \ Away	ARE	BAR	BOL	CAG	CAM	CAT	CES	CRE	GEN	LRV	LAZ	LEC	MES	MOD	PAR	PES	PIS	SAM	TAR	TRI
Arezzo	—	0–1	2–0	2–1	1–0	0–0	1–1	0–0	2–0	0–0	1–1	0–2	1–1	2–2	1–1	1–1	0–0	1–0	3–1	0–0
Bari	2–1	—	0–0	0–1	2–1	1–1	1–0	1–1	0–0	1–0	1–1	2–0	1–0	3–0	0–0	1–1	1–0	3–4	1–0	1–1
Bologna	2–2	2–2	—	3–0	1–1	0–1	2–1	0–2	0–0	1–1	1–0	1–1	1–1	4–1	0–0	0–1	0–0	3–1	1–0	1–0
Cagliari	0–0	2–2	0–0	—	1–0	3–1	3–1	2–2	2–2	1–3	0–1	0–1	0–0	4–2	1–1	0–0	2–1	1–0	1–0	0–0
Campobasso	1–0	1–0	1–1	2–0	—	4–0	1–1	0–0	0–0	2–0	0–1	3–0	0–0	2–1	0–0	1–0	0–0	0–0	1–1	3–3
Catania	1–0	1–0	1–4	0–0	1–1	—	0–0	0–1	1–1	1–2	1–0	1–1	1–0	0–0	0–0	1–0	0–0	1–0	1–2	0–0
Cesena	1–1	1–0	1–0	1–0	1–1	2–1	—	1–2	3–0	2–0	1–1	3–0	2–0	1–1	1–0	2–0	1–0	2–0	1–0	0–0
Cremonese	2–0	0–0	1–0	2–0	1–0	1–1	0–0	—	1–1	2–1	0–0	0–0	1–0	3–0	2–1	2–2	1–2	1–0	1–0	1–0
Genoa	0–0	2–0	1–1	2–0	4–2	2–0	1–1	1–1	—	2–0	2–0	3–2	1–0	3–0	1–1	2–1	1–1	3–1	0–0	1–0
L.R. Vicenza	2–2	0–0	2–2	0–1	1–1	2–1	2–2	0–0	1–1	—	0–0	1–0	1–0	3–0	2–0	1–3	2–0	0–0	1–0	0–0
Lazio	0–1	3–0	2–1	1–0	1–0	1–1	1–0	2–0	3–0	1–0	—	0–0	0–1	4–2	1–1	3–0	1–0	0–0	2–1	1–1
Lecce	1–0	1–0	2–2	3–0	1–0	2–2	1–0	2–1	2–1	1–0	2–0	—	2–0	2–0	1–0	0–0	1–0	1–1	0–1	1–1
Messina	1–0	0–0	1–0	2–0	0–0	1–1	3–1	1–0	2–1	1–1	2–0	1–0	—	0–0	1–1	0–0	1–1	1–0	2–1	1–0
Modena	1–1	1–1	1–0	1–0	1–0	1–0	1–0	1–1	1–1	0–0	1–1	1–0	1–1	—	1–1	2–1	0–1	0–4	2–0	0–0
Parma	0–0	2–1	2–0	0–0	2–0	1–0	0–1	1–0	1–1	4–1	0–0	0–0	1–0	0–0	—	1–2	2–0	2–1	1–0	2–1
Pescara	2–1	0–0	1–0	3–2	0–1	1–0	1–1	2–0	2–1	2–0	1–1	0–0	1–1	1–2	1–0	—	3–1	2–0	3–0	2–0
Pisa	1–1	2–0	2–3	3–2	2–1	2–1	1–0	1–1	2–0	2–0	3–0	3–2	3–1	0–2	1–0	0–0	—	0–0	2–0	2–1
Samb.	0–0	0–2	1–2	1–1	1–0	1–0	0–0	2–0	2–2	2–1	1–0	2–1	2–0	3–1	0–0	1–2	0–2	—	1–1	1–0
Taranto	3–1	1–1	1–1	1–1	4–2	1–1	0–1	3–1	3–0	1–0	1–1	2–2	1–1	1–0	3–0	1–0	1–1	0–0	—	0–0
Triestina	1–1	1–1	1–0	3–0	2–1	0–1	3–0	1–0	0–0	1–0	1–0	0–0	1–1	1–1	1–1	3–1	0–0	1–0	2–1	—

Legend: Blue = home team win; Yellow = draw; Red = away team win.

== Tie-breakers ==
=== Promotion tie-breaker ===
Team 1	Score	Team 2
Cesena (Italy)	0-0	(Italy) Lecce
Lecce (Italy)	4-1	(Italy) Cremonese
Cesena (Italy)	1-0	(Italy) Cremonese

Team 1	Score	Team 2
Cesena (Italy)	2-1	(Italy) Lecce

Played in San Benedetto del Tronto on July 8

Cesena promoted to Serie A.

=== Relegation tie-breaker ===
Team 1	Score	Team 2
Taranto (Italy)	1-0	(Italy) Lazio
Campobasso (Italy)	1-1	(Italy) Taranto
Lazio (Italy)	1-0	(Italy) Campobasso

Campobasso relegated to Serie C1.

== Attendances ==
#	Club	Average
1	Lazio	30,945
2	Genoa	20,002
3	Pescara	18,245
4	Bologna	17,233
5	Lecce	16,400
6	Messina	14,544
7	Bari	13,971
8	Vicenza	11,346
9	Parma	11,243
10	Pisa	10,710
11	Cagliari	10,428
12	Cremonese	10,012
13	Cesena	9,796
14	Modena	9,604
15	Taranto	8,960
16	Triestina	7,463
17	Catania	7,331
18	Sambenedettese	6,149
19	Arezzo	5,870
20	Campobasso	5,727

== References and sources ==
- Almanacco Illustrato del Calcio - La Storia 1898-2004, Panini Edizioni, Modena, September 2005
