= Renato Gei =

Italian footballer and manager

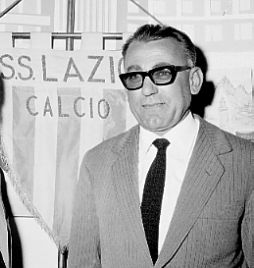

Personal information
- Full name: Renato Gei
- Date of birth: 1 February 1921
- Place of birth: Brescia, Italy
- Date of death: 20 May 1999 (aged 78)
- Place of death: Nave, Italy
- Position: Forward

Senior career*
Years	Team	Apps	(Gls)
1938–1941	Brescia	65	(35)
1941	Torino	0	(0)
1941–1943	Fiorentina	53	(29)
1944	Brescia	11	(5)
1948–1953	Sampdoria	149	(44)
1953–1955	Brescia	45	(8)
1929–1931	Spezia	10	(0)
1955–1956	Pavia	29	(3)

International career
1951	Italy	1	(0)

Managerial career
- 1955–1956: Pavia
- 1961–1963: Genoa
- 1963–1967: Brescia
- 1967–1968: Lazio
- 1968–1969: Lecco
- 1969–1970: Atalanta
- 1970–1971: Casertana
- 1972–1974: Brescia
- 1975: Parma
- 1976–1977: Seregno
- * Club domestic league appearances and goals

Renato Gei (Italian pronunciation: [reˈnaːto ˈdʒɛi]; 1 February 1921 – 20 May 1999) was an Italian association football manager and footballer who played as a forward. On 25 November 1951, he represented the Italy national football team on the occasion of a friendly match against Switzerland in a 1–1 away draw.
