= 1987–88 Serie C1 =

Italian football league season

The 1987–88 Serie C1 was the 10th season of Serie C1, the third tier of Italian football, which is now known as Serie C.

== Special rules ==
Following the expansion of the Serie A, only for this time:

- an additional promotion for one of the third teams was added,
- relegations were reduced from four to three clubs per group.

== Group A (North) ==
	Classifica	Pt
1.	ANCONA (P)	45
2.	MONZA (P)	45
3.	Virescit Boccaleone	43
4.	Lanerossi Vicenza	42
5.	Prato	41
6.	Spezia	39
7.	Spal	39
8.	Vis Pesaro	38
9.	Trento	37
10.	Reggiana	36
10.	Lucchese	36
12.	Rimini	31
13.	Derthona	27
14.	Livorno	26
15.	Centese	24
16.	Fano (DR)	24
17.	Pavia (DR)	21
18.	Ospitaletto (R)	11

== Group B (South) ==
	Classifica	Pt
1.	LICATA (P)	45
2.	COSENZA (P)	45
3.	REGGINA (P)	43
4.	Campobasso	42
5.	Foggia	39
6.	Monopoli	38
7.	Sassari Torres	36
8.	Francavilla	35
9.	Frosinone	34
10.	Salernitana	33
11.	Cagliari	31
11.	Casertana	31
11.	Ischia Isolaverde	31
14.	Brindisi	30
15.	Catania	30
16.	Nocerina (RERRR)	30
17.	Campania-Puteolana (R)	21
18.	Teramo (R)	18

SPECIAL PROMOTION MATCH

- Perugia, 12 June 1988, Reggina-Virescit Bocaleone 2-0

== References and sources ==
- Almanacco Illustrato del Calcio - La Storia 1898-2004, Panini Edizioni, Modena, September 2005

Specific
