= Giuseppe Bigogno =

Italian footballer (1909–1977)

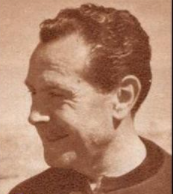
- Bigogno in the 1940s

Personal information
- Date of birth: 22 July 1909
- Place of birth: Albizzate, Italy

Senior career*
Years	Team	Apps	(Gls)
1925–1931	Legnano	101	(2)
1931–1936	Fiorentina	137	(4)
1936–1939	Genoa	79	(1)
1939–1942	Fiorentina	47	(1)

Managerial career
- 1945–1946: Fiorentina
- 1946–1949: A.C. Milan
- 1949–1951: Torino
- 1951–1953: Lazio
- 1953–1958: Udinese
- 1958–1959: Inter Milan
- 1959–1960: Udinese
- 1967–1968: Udinese
- * Club domestic league appearances and goals

Giuseppe Bigogno (22 July 1909 – 1977) was an Italian footballer and manager from Albizzate in the Province of Varese. He spent eight seasons of his career at Fiorentina. Bigogno went on to manage some of the top clubs in Italy, including Fiorentina, Milan, Inter Milan and Torino.

== Honours ==
=== Player ===
Genova 1893

- Coppa Italia: 1936–37

Fiorentina

- Coppa Italia: 1939–40

=== Manager ===
Udinese

- Serie B: 1955–56
