= Tommaso Maestrelli =

Italian footballer and manager

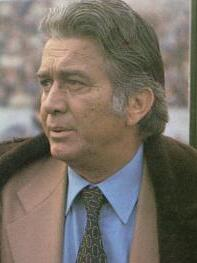
- 1970s

Personal information
- Full name: Tommaso Maestrelli
- Date of birth: 7 October 1922
- Place of birth: Pisa, Kingdom of Italy
- Date of death: 2 December 1976 (aged 54)
- Place of death: Rome, Italy
- Position: Midfielder

Senior career*
Years	Team	Apps	(Gls)
1938–1948	Bari	146	(20)
1948–1951	Roma	95	(4)
1951–1953	Lucchese	47	(1)
1953–1957	Bari	73	(1)

International career
1948	Italy	1	(0)

Managerial career
- 1963–1964: Bari
- 1964–1968: Reggina
- 1968–1970: Foggia
- 1971–1976: Lazio
- * Club domestic league appearances and goals

Tommaso Maestrelli (Italian pronunciation: [tomˈmaːzo maeˈstrɛlli]; 7 October 1922 – 2 December 1976) was an Italian footballer and manager, who played as a midfielder. He was well known for leading Lazio to their first Serie A title during the 1973–74 season. He also played for Italy at the 1948 Summer Olympics.

== Honours ==
=== Managerial ===
Lazio

- Serie A (1): 1973–74

Reggina

- Serie C (1): 1964–65

=== Individual ===
- Seminatore d'oro (2): 1968–69 (with Foggia), 1973–74 (with Lazio)
