= Karl Stürmer =

Austrian footballer (1882–1943)

Personal information
- Date of birth: 9 October 1882
- Place of birth: Vienna, Austria-Hungary
- Date of death: 1943 (aged 60)
- Place of death: Faenza, Italy
- Positions: Defender; midfielder

Senior career*
Years	Team	Apps	(Gls)
1898	First Vienna		
1901–?	Wiener AC		

International career
1903–1905	Austria	2	(0)

Managerial career
- 1918–1919: Wiener AC
- 1919–1920: Rudolfshügel
- 1920–1922: Reggiana
- 1922–1924: Torino
- 1924–1926: Reggiana
- 1926–1929: Prato
- 1929–1930: Torino
- 1931–1932: Alessandria
- 1932–1934: Lazio
- 1934: Massese
- 1934–1936: Livorno
- 1936–1937: Alessandria
- 1938–1939: Juventus (assistant coach)
- 1940–1941: Cremonese
- 1941–1942: Verona
- 1942–1943: Cesena
- * Club domestic league appearances and goals

Karl Stürmer (9 October 1882 – 1943) was an Austrian professional footballer and manager.

== Playing career ==
As a footballer, he grew up in Wiener Cricket; then he played as full-back for First Vienna FC and as midfielder for Wiener AC.

With Wiener AC he won a Tagblatt Pokal in 1901. He played two matches with Austria national team.

== Coaching career ==
In 1918 Stürmer began a long career as manager in Austria and Italy.

He managed Reggiana and Prato in Divisione Nazionale and Torino, Alessandria, Lazio, Livorno and Juventus (as Virginio Rosetta assistant) in Serie A.

== Death ==
He died in 1943, shot by the Germans in Faenza, Italy, during Nazi German occupation of the country in World War II.
