= Enrique Flamini =

Argentine-Italian footballer and manager (1917-1982)

Personal information
- Date of birth: 17 April 1917
- Place of birth: Rosario, Argentina
- Date of death: 11 January 1982 (aged 64)
- Place of death: Buenos Aires, Argentina
- Position: Striker

Senior career*
Years	Team	Apps	(Gls)
1938	Racing Club	1	(1)
1938	Talleres (RE)	15	(8)
1939–1943	Lazio	113	(11)
1944	Peñarol	?	(?)
1944–1945	Esporte Clube Cruzeiro	?	(?)
1946–1952	Lazio	138	(32)
1952–1953	Reggiana	3	(0)
1953–1954	Lazio	0	(0)
1954–1955	Terracina	3	(0)

Managerial career
- 1960–1961: Lazio
- * Club domestic league appearances and goals

Enrique Flamini also known as Enrico Flamini (17 April 1917 – 11 January 1982) was an Argentine-Italian footballer and manager.
