= Ferenc Molnár (footballer) =

Hungarian footballer and manager

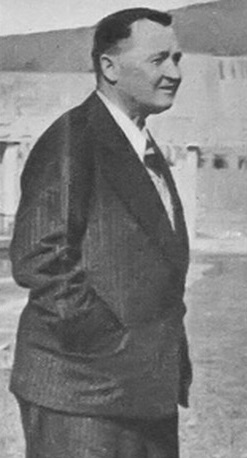

Personal information
- Full name: Ferenc Molnár
- Date of birth: 8 April 1891
- Place of birth: Érd, Austria-Hungary
- Date of death: Unknown
- Position: Midfielder

Senior career*
Years	Team	Apps	(Gls)
- MTK Budapest
1920–1922	Spes Genova		
1922–1923	Spezia		
1923–1924	Anconitana		
1924–1925	Verona		
1925–1926	Fiume		

Managerial career
- 1926–1927: Biellese
- 1927: Andrea Doria
- 1927–1928: Napoli
- 1927–1928: Casale
- 1930–1931: Lazio
- 1931–1932: Novara
- 1932–1933: Alessandria
- 1933–1934: Anconitana
- 1934–1935: Cagliari
- 1937–1938: Fiorentina
- 1938–1939: Juve Domodossola
- 1939–1940: Varese
- 1940–1941: Lazio
- 1941: Ambrosiana-Inter
- 1942–1943: Udinese
- 1943: Reggiana
- * Club domestic league appearances and goals

Ferenc Molnár (8 April 1891 – ?) was a Hungarian football player and manager. As a player, he played as a midfielder and competed with MTK Budapest for thirteen years before moving to Italy to play for and manage many clubs.

From 1920 onwards, starting with Spes Genova; Molnár acted as a player-manager, eventually in 1926 he became just a manager. For much of the time that Molnár was a manager he moved around each season, spending spells at numerous clubs. In 1943 he was forced to leave Italy when the Hungarian army reserve drafted him.
