= Juan Carlos Morrone =

Argentine footballer and manager

Personal information
- Date of birth: 5 February 1941 (age 85)
- Place of birth: Buenos Aires, Argentina
- Position: Striker

Senior career*
Years	Team	Apps	(Gls)
1958–1960	Platense	?	(46)
1960–1964	Lazio	114	(32)
1964–1966	Fiorentina	61	(13)
1966–1971	Lazio	125	(16)
1971–1973	Foggia	43	(4)
1973–1975	Avellino	26	(0)

Managerial career
- 1983: Lazio
- 1998–1999: Catanzaro
- * Club domestic league appearances and goals

Juan Carlos Morrone also known as Giancarlo Morrone (born 5 February 1941) is an Argentine retired footballer and manager.

== Career ==
Morrone played for Platense in his native Argentina, before moving to Lazio in Italy, following an impressive game-to-goal ratio in the Argentine football. Morrone played for Lazio in nine seasons overall, scoring 48 league goals for the club. He also had a stint in Fiorentina in the mid-1960s, before returning to Lazio once more.
