= Giorgio Magnocavallo =

Italian footballer

Personal information
- Date of birth: 11 April 1957 (age 69)
- Place of birth: Chieuti, Italy
- Height: 1.76 m (5 ft 9 1/2 in)
- Position: Defender

Senior career*
Years	Team	Apps	(Gls)
1975–1976	Lecco	27	(0)
1976–1977	Varese	29	(2)
1977–1978	Brescia	9	(0)
1978–1979	Genoa	19	(1)
1979–1981	Triestina	53	(8)
1981–1985	Atalanta	119	(8)
1985–1987	Lazio	54	(3)
1987–1988	Barletta	50	(2)
1989–1990	Spal	19	(5)
1990–1991	Formia	17	(0)
- * Club domestic league appearances and goals

Giorgio Magnocavallo (born 11 April 1957) is an Italian former professional footballer.

== Life ==
Born at Chieuti, Magnocavallo grew up in the Province of Bergamo and joined in his teen years the youths team of Internazionale. He started his professional career with Lecco.

In the following years he moved to Atalanta B.C, with which, in 1984–85, he played his only season in Serie A.
