= Claudio Vinazzani =

Italian footballer (born 1954)

Personal information
- Full name: Claudio Vinazzani
- Date of birth: 18 April 1954 (age 72)
- Place of birth: Carrara, Italy
- Height: 1.77 m (5 ft 10 in)
- Position: Midfielder

Senior career*
Years	Team	Apps	(Gls)
1971–1972	Massese	1	(0)
1972–1973	Carrarese	24	(1)
1973–1974	Olbia	31	(3)
1974–1976	Massese	68	(1)
1976–1983	Napoli	188	(4)
1983–1986	Lazio	72	(1)

Managerial career
- 1999–2000: Entella
- * Club domestic league appearances and goals

Claudio Vinazzani (18 April 1954) is an Italian former footballer who played as a midfielder.

== Career ==
Born in Carrara, Vinazzani began playing football with local side Massese. After several seasons in the lower levels, including spells with Carrarese and Olbia, he joined Napoli in 1976, where he would make his Serie A debut against Catanzaro on 3 October 1976.

== Honours ==
=== Club ===
Napoli

- Anglo-Italian League Cup (1): 1976

Sporting positions
Preceded by Giuseppe Bruscolotti	Napoli captain 1980–1983	Succeeded by Giuseppe Bruscolotti
