= Mario Sperone =

Italian footballer (1905–1975)

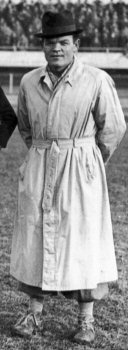
- Sperone with Torino

Personal information
- Date of birth: 1 July 1905
- Place of birth: Priocca, Italy
- Date of death: 18 December 1975 (aged 70)
- Place of death: Turin, Italy
- Position: Midfielder

Youth career
- Torino

Senior career*
Years	Team	Apps	(Gls)
1923–1932	Torino	143	(1)

International career
1927	Italy	2	(0)

Managerial career
- 1938: Torino
- 1938–1939: Torino (assistant)
- 1940–1942: Torino (assistant)
- 1945–1946: Alessandria
- 1946–1947: Biellese
- 1947–1948: Torino
- 1948–1951: Lazio
- 1951–1952: Torino
- 1951–1952: Milan
- 1953–1954: Lazio
- 1955: Palermo
- 1956: Alessandria
- * Club domestic league appearances and goals

Mario Sperone (Italian pronunciation: [ˈmaːrjo speˈroːne]; 1 July 1905 – 18 December 1975) was an Italian football manager and former player who played as a midfielder.

== Club career ==
A midfielder, Sperone played his entire playing career with Torino, the team in which he collected 138 appearances (one in Coppa Italia) in nine consecutive seasons. He began his career in the first team on 10 February 1924 in a home game against Novese (5–0); winning the title in 1926–27 (later revoked) and in 1927–28. The last match he played was a loss away to Milan on 29 May 1932, a 6–1.

== International career ==
On 17 April 1927, he debuted his international career with the Italy national team in a friendly match in Turin won 3–1 against Portugal.

== Managerial career ==
With Torino he also took up coaching, succeeding Gyula Feldmann in 1938. The following season, he was the second-in-command to Ernest Erbstein, in 1940–41 to Tony Cargnelli and in 1941–42 to András Kuttik. In the postwar he managed Alessandria, winning the championship of Series BC Alta Italy 1945–46; in 1947–48 he won the league title at the helm of the Grande Torino, with a 16-point lead and 125 goals scored in 40 games played.

As an established manager, he led among others Lazio, Milan, and Palermo, concluding his career on the bench of Alessandria in 1956–57, when he resigned with seven matches in the league left to play and was replaced by Luciano Robotti. He later worked for Torino as a scout.

== Honours ==
=== Player ===
Torino

- Italian Football Championship: 1927–28

=== Manager ===
Torino

- Serie A: 1947–48
