= Luigi Ferrero =

Italian footballer (1904–1984)

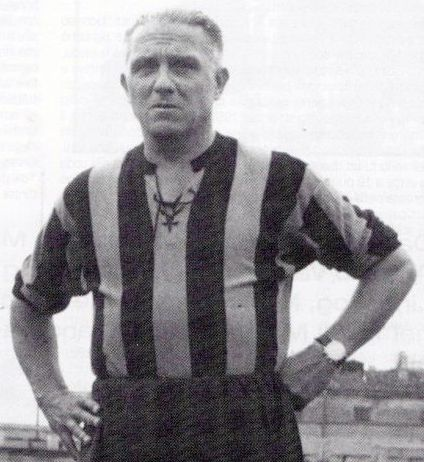
- Ferrero in 1956

Personal information
- Full name: Luigi Ferrero
- Date of birth: 26 December 1904
- Place of birth: Turin, Italy
- Date of death: 30 October 1984 (aged 79)
- Place of death: Turin, Italy
- Position: Forward

Senior career*
Years	Team	Apps	(Gls)
1921–1926	Juventus	47	(2)
1926–1927	Libertas Lucca	16	(8)
1927–1930	Pistoiese	75	(23)
1930–1932	Ambrosiana-Inter	40	(11)
1932–1937	Bari	133	(35)
1937–1940	Torino	50	(11)
Total		361	(90)

Managerial career
- 1939–1940: Torino
- 1940–1941: Bari
- 1941–1943: Pescara
- 1945–1947: Torino
- 1947–1951: Fiorentina
- 1951–1952: Lucchese
- 1952–1954: Atalanta
- 1954: Hellas Verona
- 1955–1956: Lazio
- 1957: Inter Milan
- 1959: Fiorentina
- 1960–1961: SPAL
- 1963–1964: Prato
- 1967–1968: Fiorentina
- * Club domestic league appearances and goals

Luigi Ferrero (26 December 1904 – 30 October 1984) was an Italian football manager and former player. A forward, he spent time with some of the top clubs in his country such as Inter Milan and others.

== Honours ==
Juventus

- Prima Divisione: 1925–26
