= Alexander Popovich =

Austrian footballer and manager

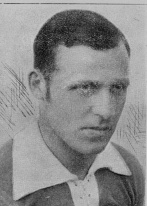

Personal information
- Full name: Alexander Popovich
- Date of birth: 18 July 1891
- Place of birth: Vienna, Austria
- Date of death: 7 September 1952 (aged 61)
- Position: Defender

Senior career*
Years	Team	Apps	(Gls)
1911–1922	SV Amateure Wien		
1922–1923	Rapid Vienna	13	(0)
1923–1924	Amateure Wien		
1924–1925	Wiener AC		

International career
1911–1923	Austria	33	(1)

Managerial career
- 1927: Hertha Berlin
- 1929-1932: Minerva Berlin
- 1941–1943: Lazio
- Bologna
- * Club domestic league appearances and goals

Alexander "Xandl" Popovich (18 July 1891 - 7 September 1952) also known by different variations of his last name such as Popovic and Poppovich, was a professional football player and manager from Austria.

== Club career ==
He played all of his club football in Vienna, most prominently for Austria Vienna, where he spent over a decade, winning the Austrian Cup twice and the Austrian Championship. He also won the Austrian Championship with Rapid Vienna.

== International career ==
He made his debut for Austria in October 1911 against Germany. He earned 33 caps, scoring one goal.

== Coaching career ==
After retiring from playing, he moved into the management field, managing top clubs in Germany, such as Hertha Berlin and later Italy, where he managed Lazio and Bologna.

== Honours ==
- Austrian Football Bundesliga (2):
  - 1923, 1924
- Austrian Cup (2):
  - 1921, 1924
