= 1968–69 Serie B =

Italian football league season

Serie B
- Season: 1968–69
- Champions: Lazio; 1st title

Serie B 1968-69 team distribution

The Serie B 1968–69 was the thirty-seventh tournament of this competition played in Italy since its creation.

== Teams ==
Como, Cesena and Ternana had been promoted from Serie C, while SPAL, Brescia and Mantova had been relegated from Serie A.

== Final classification ==
Pos	Team	Pld	W	D	L	GF	GA	GD	Pts	Promotion or relegation
1	Lazio (P, C)	38	17	16	5	55	27	+28	50	Promotion to Serie A
2	Brescia (P)	38	17	14	7	46	24	+22	48	Promotion to Serie A
3	Bari (P)	38	14	19	5	34	27	+7	47	Promotion to Serie A
4	Reggiana	38	17	12	9	36	23	+13	46	
5	Reggina	38	13	18	7	36	24	+12	44	
6	Genoa	38	10	21	7	36	29	+7	41	
7	Como	38	14	13	11	33	28	+5	41	
8	Perugia	38	9	20	9	31	26	+5	38	
9	Foggia	38	11	16	11	33	35	−2	38	
10	Ternana	38	11	14	13	34	36	−2	36	
11	Mantova	38	10	15	13	30	30	0	35	
12	Monza	38	8	19	11	32	38	−6	35	
13	Livorno	38	11	13	14	29	35	−6	35	
14	Catanzaro	38	10	15	13	23	31	−8	35	
15	Catania	38	10	15	13	19	28	−9	35	
16	Cesena	38	10	14	14	27	37	−10	34	
17	Modena	38	9	14	15	26	34	−8	32	
18	S.P.A.L. (R)	38	8	15	15	30	38	−8	31	Relegation to Serie C
19	Lecco (R)	38	7	16	15	26	38	−12	30	Relegation to Serie C
20	Padova (R)	38	8	13	17	25	53	−28	29	Relegation to Serie C

Source: Relegation tie-breakers were abolished introducing the goal difference.
(C) Champions; (P) Promoted; (R) Relegated

== Results ==
Home \ Away	BAR	BRE	CTN	CTZ	CES	COM	FOG	GEN	LAZ	LCO	LIV	MAN	MOD	MON	PAD	PER	REA	REG	SPA	TER
Bari		1–1	1–0	2–3	1–0	0–0	0–0	1–0	0–0	2–0	2–1	0–0	1–0	2–1	2–0	2–0	1–0	2–2	2–1	0–0
Brescia	2–2		3–0	2–0	1–0	3–1	3–2	1–1	1–1	2–0	0–0	0–0	3–0	3–0	4–0	1–0	1–0	1–1	3–0	3–2
Catania	0–0	1–0		1–0	1–0	0–1	0–0	0–0	0–1	1–1	1–0	1–1	0–0	0–0	2–0	1–0	2–1	2–2	1–0	0–0
Catanzaro	1–1	1–1	1–0		0–0	1–1	1–1	2–0	1–1	1–0	0–0	1–0	0–0	1–2	0–1	0–0	1–0	2–1	1–0	1–0
Cesena	0–0	0–0	2–2	0–1		2–1	1–0	0–1	0–4	2–1	0–0	3–0	1–0	0–0	3–1	2–1	0–0	0–0	1–0	1–1
Como	0–1	1–0	1–0	1–0	1–1		1–1	0–2	0–0	2–0	2–0	1–0	0–1	5–0	3–0	1–0	0–0	1–1	1–0	1–0
Foggia	4–0	1–0	1–0	1–1	1–1	4–1		0–0	1–1	1–2	1–0	1–0	1–0	1–1	2–0	1–0	0–0	0–2	0–0	2–1
Genoa	0–0	1–1	3–0	0–0	1–2	1–1	1–1		3–2	2–2	1–0	2–0	1–1	2–2	2–0	1–0	0–0	4–0	0–1	1–1
Lazio	3–0	1–0	1–0	2–0	2–0	5–2	2–2	4–1		3–0	1–0	1–1	2–1	1–1	4–0	1–1	1–1	0–0	1–1	3–1
Lecco	0–0	0–1	1–0	0–0	1–1	2–0	1–1	0–0	1–2		1–2	0–0	3–1	2–1	0–0	0–0	0–1	1–0	0–0	1–1
Livorno	1–2	0–0	0–0	3–1	1–0	0–0	1–0	0–1	1–0	0–1		1–1	2–0	2–1	2–3	1–1	2–1	1–0	3–1	2–1
Mantova	0–0	1–2	1–0	1–0	2–0	0–0	3–0	2–0	0–1	1–0	2–2		1–2	1–0	2–0	0–1	2–0	1–1	1–1	2–0
Modena	0–0	1–2	1–1	1–0	0–0	0–2	4–0	0–0	1–1	0–0	2–0	1–0		1–1	2–1	0–0	3–0	0–0	1–0	1–2
Monza	0–0	2–0	3–0	0–0	2–0	0–0	0–1	0–0	1–0	1–1	0–0	0–0	0–0		5–1	0–0	1–1	1–1	1–1	1–0
Padova	1–2	0–0	0–0	0–0	0–1	1–0	1–0	1–1	0–0	1–0	0–0	1–1	2–0	1–0		0–0	1–1	2–1	1–1	3–3
Perugia	2–2	2–0	0–0	3–0	1–0	0–0	0–0	1–1	1–1	4–2	3–0	1–1	0–0	1–0	2–0		1–1	0–0	1–1	2–0
Reggiana	1–0	0–1	0–0	2–0	2–0	1–0	3–0	1–0	1–0	1–1	3–0	1–0	1–0	2–2	1–0	3–0		1–0	2–1	1–0
Reggina	1–0	1–0	0–1	0–0	3–0	0–0	2–1	0–0	0–0	1–0	1–0	3–1	1–0	4–0	1–1	0–0	2–0		1–1	2–0
SPAL	1–1	0–0	0–1	2–1	3–2	0–1	0–0	1–1	1–2	0–0	0–0	2–1	3–1	2–0	3–1	2–1	0–2	0–0		0–1
Ternana	1–1	0–0	2–0	1–0	1–1	1–0	1–0	1–1	2–0	2–1	1–1	0–0	2–0	1–2	2–0	1–1	0–0	0–1	1–0	

Source: Almanacco Illustrato del Calcio – La Storia 1898-2004, Panini Edizioni, Modena, September 2005 (in Italian)
Legend: Blue = home team win; Yellow = draw; Red = away team win.

== Attendances ==
#	Club	Average
1	Lazio	21,935
2	Bari	15,046
3	Brescia	14,130
4	Genoa	13,054
5	Foggia	12,839
6	Livorno	10,964
7	Reggina	10,292
8	SPAL	9,317
9	Reggiana	8,467
10	Ternana	7,227
11	Perugia	7,139
12	Mantova	6,923
13	Modena	6,888
14	Catania	6,393
15	Como	6,297
16	Novara	5,610
17	Lecco	5,340
18	Cesena	5,230
19	Monza	5,039
20	Catanzaro	3,494

== References and sources ==
- Almanacco Illustrato del Calcio – La Storia 1898-2004, Panini Edizioni, Modena, September 2005

Specific
