= József Viola =

Hungarian footballer and coach

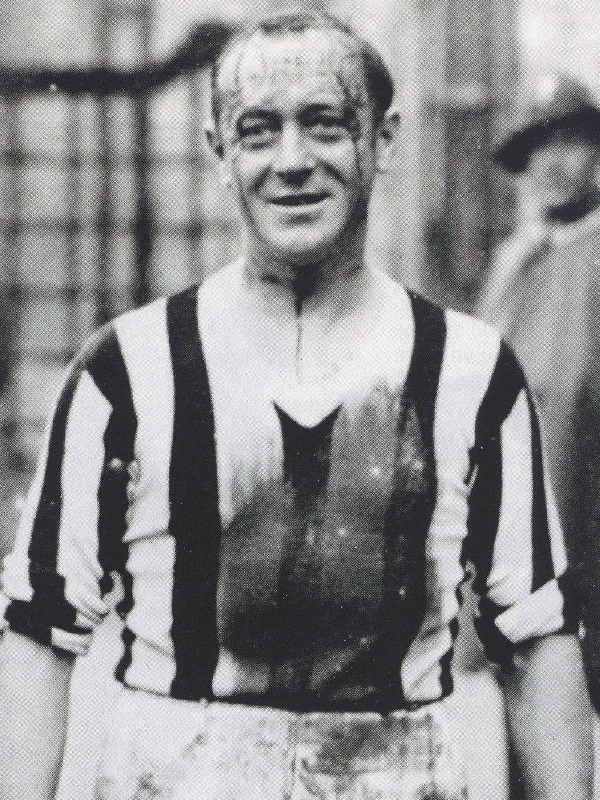
- Viola with Juventus in the 1920s

Personal information
- Date of birth: 10 June 1896
- Place of birth: Komárom, Austria-Hungary (now Komárno, Slovakia)
- Date of death: 18 August 1949 (aged 53)
- Place of death: Bologna, Italy
- Position: Midfielder

Senior career*
Years	Team	Apps	(Gls)
1919–20	Törekvés SE		
1921–22	RSV Berlin		
1922–23	C.S. Firenze		
1923–24	Spezia		
1924–27	Juventus	56	(4)
1928–29	Internazionale		
1929–30	Juventus	21	(0)
1930–31	Atalanta	18	(0)

International career
1920	Hungary	1	(0)

Managerial career
- 1926–28: Juventus
- 1928–29: Internazionale
- 1930–33: Atalanta
- 1933–34: Milan
- 1934–36: Vicenza
- 1936–39: Lazio
- 1938–40: Milan
- 1938–39: Spezia
- 1940–41: Livorno
- SPAL
- 1945–46: Genoa
- 1946–47: Bologna
- 1947–48: Como
- * Club domestic league appearances and goals

József Viola (10 June 1896 – 18 August 1949) also known as Giuseppe Viola was a Hungarian football player and coach, who played as a midfielder. He is most prominent for his time in Italy and his association with clubs such as Juventus. He also made one appearance for the Hungary national football team in 1920.

== Honours ==
=== Club ===
Juventus

- Serie A: 1925–26
