= Oliviero Garlini =

Italian footballer (1957–2025)

Personal information
- Date of birth: 4 March 1957
- Place of birth: Stezzano, Italy
- Date of death: 8 May 2025 (aged 68)
- Place of death: Gandino, Italy
- Height: 1.77 m (5 ft 10 in)
- Position: Striker

Senior career*
Years	Team	Apps	(Gls)
1975–1976	Como	3	(0)
1976–1977	Empoli	18	(6)
1977–1979	Nocerina	65	(9)
1979–1980	Fano	32	(14)
1980–1984	Cesena	119	(25)
1984–1986	Lazio	58	(19)
1986–1987	Internazionale	20	(4)
1987–1988	Atalanta	38	(18)
1988–1989	Ancona	23	(5)
1989–1990	Ascoli	17	(0)
1990–1991	Ravenna	24	(3)
1991–1992	Corbetta	9	(2)
Total		426	(105)
- * Club domestic league appearances and goals

Oliviero Garlini (4 March 1957 – 8 May 2025) was an Italian professional footballer who played as a striker.

Garlini scored 18 goals in 38 league matches over two seasons playing for Atalanta. He died in Gandino on 8 May 2025, at the age of 68.
