= Roberto Lovati =

Italian footballer and manager

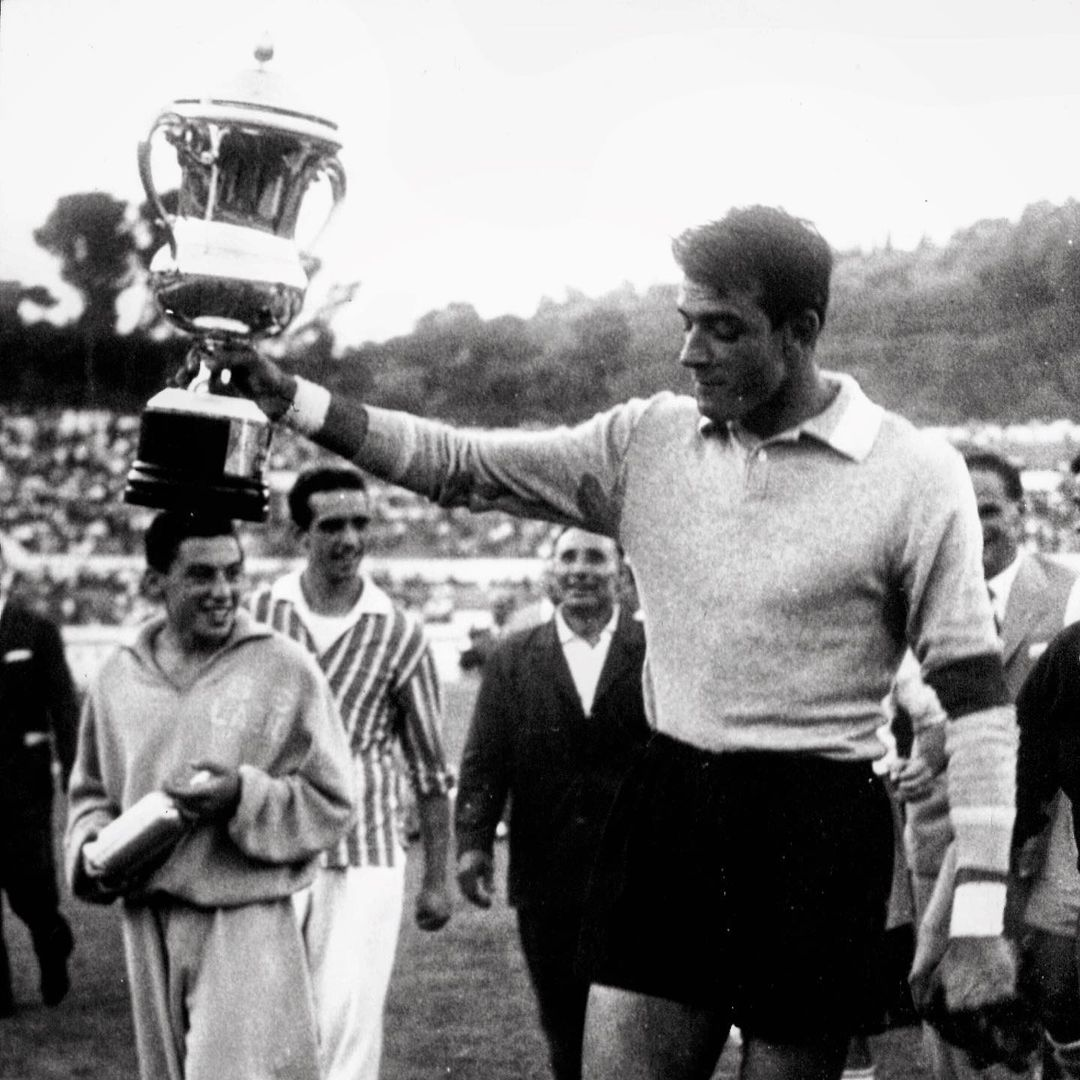
- Lovati celebrating the 1958 Coppa Italia for Lazio

Personal information
- Full name: Roberto Lovati
- Date of birth: 20 July 1927
- Place of birth: Cusano Milanino, Italy
- Date of death: 30 March 2011 (aged 83)
- Place of death: Rome, Italy
- Position: Goalkeeper

Senior career*
Years	Team	Apps	(Gls)
1947	Pisa	0	(0)
1947–1948	→ Vimercatese (loan)	?	(0)
1948–1949	→ Monsummano (loan)	?	(0)
1949–1952	Pisa	59	(0)
1952–1954	Monza	68	(0)
1954	Lazio	0	(0)
1954–1955	→ Torino (loan)	10	(0)
1955–1961	Lazio	135	(0)

International career
1957	Italy	2	(0)

Managerial career
- 1962: Lazio
- 1962–1963: Lazio
- 1968: Lazio
- 1969–1970: Lazio
- 1971: Lazio
- 1978–1980: Lazio
- 1983: Lazio
- 1985: Lazio
- * Club domestic league appearances and goals

Roberto Lovati (Italian pronunciation: [roˈbɛrto loˈvaːti]; 20 July 1927 – 30 March 2011) was an Italian association football manager and footballer who played as a goalkeeper. He represented the Italy national football team twice, the first being on 25 April 1957, the occasion of a friendly match against Northern Ireland in a 1–0 home win. He was also part of Italy's squad for the 1952 Summer Olympics, but he did not play in any matches.

== Honours ==
=== Player ===
Lazio

- Coppa Italia: 1958
