= Eugenio Fascetti =

Italian footballer and coach (born 1938)

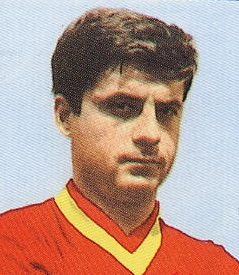
- Fascetti with Messina

Personal information
- Date of birth: 23 October 1938 (age 88)
- Place of birth: Viareggio, Italy
- Height: 1.73 m (5 ft 8 in)
- Position: Midfielder

Senior career*
Years	Team	Apps	(Gls)
1956–1960	Bologna	25	(2)
1960–1961	Juventus	2	(0)
1961–1964	Messina	66	(8)
1964–1965	Lazio	12	(0)
1965–1966	Messina	21	(2)
1966–1968	Savona	73	(5)
1968–1969	Lecco	0	(0)
1969–1970	Viareggio	30	(0)

Managerial career
- 1979–1982: Varese
- 1983–1986: Lecce
- 1986–1988: Lazio
- 1988–1989: Avellino
- 1989–1990: Torino
- 1990–1992: Verona
- 1993–1994: Lucchese
- 1996–2000: Bari
- 2001–2002: Vicenza
- 2002: Fiorentina
- 2002–2004: Como
- * Club domestic league appearances and goals

Eugenio Fascetti (born 23 October 1938) is an Italian professional football coach and a former player, who played as a midfielder.

Fascetti managed S.S.C. Bari in Serie A for several seasons before being dismissed towards the end of the 2000–01 season with the club in last place. Fascetti would manage Calcio Como from December 2002 until April 2004.

== Honours ==
=== Player ===
Juventus

- Serie A: 1960–61.

=== Manager ===
- As a coach, won promotion to Serie A 5 times: 1984–85 (Lecce), 1987–88 (Lazio), 1989–90 (Torino), 1990–91 (Verona), 1996–97 (Bari).
