= Francesco Fonte =

Italian former footballer

Francesco Fonte (born October 8, 1965, in Rome, Italy) is an Italian former footballer who played as a central midfielder.

== Career ==
Fonte was one of the youth products of Lazio who made his debut during the 1984-85 season. The promise shown by the youngsters was a rare highlight in a dismal relegation season. He moved down to lower league sides Barletta and Monopoli, before brief spells at Bari and Foggia. Fonte enjoyed a longer spell at Avellino, before moving on to Benevento, L'Aquila and finally Battipagliese where he played in Serie C1. Lazio continued to play well in the years after the B series.
