= History of Calcio Foggia 1920 =

History of Italian football club Calcio Foggia 1920

The history of Calcio Foggia 1920 spans from the inception as a multi-sport club in 1920 to the present day. The club has gone through many mergers and reformations, most recently in 2019. The team most recently participated in the top level Serie A in 1995 while it played the 2025 season in Serie C.

== The origins ==
=== Before the First World War ===
==== Daunia ====
Historically, the first known team in the Province of Foggia was Daunia, founded in 1909; the official kit had black-and-white stripes, and the second kit was pink. The playing field was a small pitch on the outskirts of town, in the area that today corresponds to the Shooting Range.

==== The Sardegna and Calciatori multi-sport clubs ====
In 1911, U.S. Sardegna and Unione Sportiva Calciatori were founded in Foggia.

U.S. Sardegna took its name from Marinucci, a Sardinian who was the son of the principal of the Normal School.

The Unione Sportiva Calciatori, which wore a white shirt with horizontal black stripes, won the "Coppa Città di Foggia" on 26 May 1912, beating Bari 1-0. Giuseppe Comei, a native of Foggia who came from Florence, was signed by Unione Sportiva Calciatori along with the Tiberini brothers, who came from Milan; the younger of the two would return to Lombardy.

===== Atleta =====
The latter, while in Milan, conceived the idea of merging the two teams: the multi-sports club U.S. Atleta was established in 1912 as a result of this union. Gustavo Nannarone served as the club's president and the team wore a white uniform.

Its debut was a derby played at the home ground of Pila e Croce against Liberty Bari, ending in a 2-2 draw. Subsequently, Atleta won a tournament in Bisceglie against some Apulian teams. In those years, the problem was finding a clubhouse; initially, the club met in a square facing the Convitto Liceale, which would later become the Courthouse. Many athletes and managers tried to convince the podestà Mandara to provide them with premises on Via Galliani, but he refused. Some officials illegally occupied the premises and found a large quantity of tiles intended for paving the sidewalks. Subsequently, Mandara changed his mind, and Atleta got its clubhouse.

With the assassination of Archduke Franz Ferdinand in 1914, the First World War began.

=== After the Great War ===
The war killed many footballers, including those from Foggia, and during that period, it was very difficult to continue playing football. Gustavo Nannarone made a notable contribution to the sport during this time. The Aviatori Foggia, a team of Foggian Navy and Aviation soldiers, contributed to the rebirth of football in Italy when they faced F.B.C. Liberty from Bari, drawing 2-2.

U.S. Atleta, which was by then establishing itself among the top teams, was invited to participate in numerous competitions, such as the "Torneo Pasquale" in Bari in April 1919, the first post-war Apulian tournament, or the "Six-a-side Football Tournament of Molfetta" on 3 October 1919, where U.S. Atleta finished in fourth place, losing the third-place final 2-0 by forfeit to Fulgor Molfetta. On 1 November, Atleta won 4-0 at the Campo Madonna della Spiga in Lucera against Sporting Club Luceria. Meanwhile, in Foggia, a new team called Vis et Vir was created, wearing a yellow kit, where Renato Sarti played, on loan from Atleta. Some members of U.S. Atleta, meanwhile, left the club to form a new one, Maciste. Sometime later, Alfredo Cicolella founded U.S. Pro Foggia. However, these three teams did not remain active for long. On May 12, 1920, they announced their merger into a single club, with Colonel Carlo Gigliotti as president.

== The beginnings ==
=== From the foundation to the "Foggia of the three Ms" ===
The club was officially established as Sporting Club Foggia on 5 July 1920 as a multi-sport club, meaning that not only soccer players were members, but also boxers, athletes, and cyclists.

After a period of inactivity, Sporting Club Foggia began its football activity on 18 March 1922, when it was beaten 2-0 by the 225th Fanteria; however in the rematch three days later, on 21 March 1922, Sporting Club Foggia won 3-0, with a hat-trick by Peppino Comei. Another match against the same team, was won by S.C. Foggia 5-0. These were the team's first matches, albeit unofficial, that they played and won.

The colours red and black were chosen as the club colours, selected by the Tiberini brothers, who were AC Milan fans.

Sporting Club Foggia became affiliated with the FIGC on 31 May 1922, and was able to participate in the Apulian Championship, but first it played some friendlies at its home ground, the Parco Comunale, such as the one on 18 June 1922, where it lost 2-0 to U.S. Biscegliese, or the one on 22 October against Andrea Doria Foggia which it won 4-1, and the rematch of the latter on 13 December, also won by S.C. Foggia 2-1. It automatically entered the final Apulian group of the 1922–23 Seconda Divisione where it finished first, under coach Roberto Fini.

The Sporting Club organized some friendlies for preparation, such as the away trip to Molfetta against Fulgor, which ended 1-1 and was started 15 minutes early due to the poor condition of the pitch (this was the red-and-blacks' first away match), and the away trip to the San Lorenzo in Bari against U.S. Ferrovieri, lost 2-0. Furthermore, the club organized a tournament, where it drew 0-0 with Ideale Bari, and won in Torremaggiore against a mixed team.

The team was strengthened by its first signings, such as goalkeeper Raffaele Ferraretti (the first signing in Foggia's history), winger Luigi D'Onofrio, and centre-forward Mario Casale from Andrea Doria-Foggia, centre-half Romano from Savoia, and full-back Michele Camero from Fulgor Molfetta. The teams from which Foggia recruited new players were all from Apulia, and especially Andrea Doria and Savoia, which were both Foggian teams.

The final group stage arrived and Sporting Club made its debut on 9 September 1923 at home against Garibaldino Taranto, winning 1-0, in what would be the first official match played by Foggia. Foggia won all its matches, except for the away game at Taranto against Enotria, where it drew, and was promoted to the First Division. To celebrate, the team organized a friendly match against Savoia, the national championship final runner-up, which they won 3-0 in Foggia. On 28 October, the Apulian Regional Committee awarded a walkover victory to Enotria for the last match, due to a pitch invasion that had led to a 5-minute extension of the match, but on November 2, the Southern League overturned the Apulian Regional Committee's verdict, officially promoting Foggia.

Promoted to the 1923–24 Prima Divisione championship, Sporting Club Foggia changed its president to Carlo Irace and inaugurated the new Pila e Croce field on November 18 in a match against Ideale Bari. The visitors won 2-0; however, the result was later invalidated due to a refereeing error. The referee suspended the match for 23 minutes in the 13th minute because the ball burst. Instead of resuming the match, he restarted it from the beginning, resulting in a total playing time of 103 minutes. Sporting Club requested that the match be annulled and succeeded. At the end of the group, however, it finished in sixth and last place with two points. Nevertheless, Foggia had a slim hope of remaining in the First Division, as the Apulian Regional Committee granted a promotion/relegation play-off between the bottom team of the First Division and the top team of the Second Division, namely Sporting Club Foggia and F.C. Bari. Foggia won the playoff 2-1, but Bari appealed, arguing that, since they had earned their promotion on the field, they should be promoted outright. Ultimately, Bari prevailed.

In the 1924-1925 season, the president was Vincenzo Gaito and the championship was not supposed to be played, as the only registered team, S.C. Foggia, was directly admitted to the promotion/relegation play-off with U.S. Ideale of Bari, a play-off which was not held due to Foggia's withdrawal. The same situation as the previous year had occurred and Foggia seemed on the verge of being promoted; however, when the 1925-26 league schedules were drawn up, it was not directly admitted to play in the Prima Divisione Apulian group, because the Apulian Regional Committee had registered F.B.C. Lecce towards the end of June. Foggia won the home leg 4-0 but Lecce won the return leg 2-1. On the neutral ground of San Lorenzo in Bari, Foggia defeated Lecce in the promotion play-off, thanks to a brace from Peppino Comei, promoting the red-and-black team back to the First Division.

In the subsequent Prima Divisione championship, the 1925-1926 season, Foggia, under the leadership of the new president, Pietro De Vita, and the newly appointed secretary, Medardo D'Angiò (a role he would only leave in 1961, upon his death), despite having made signings such as that of Edmondo Della Valle, finished last with 2 points, thus being relegated again to what had now become Prima Divisione (the second level of Italian football). This happened because Foggia had irregularly registered a player, Oscar Varola, so the last three league matches were declared lost by forfeit. In its debut on 22 November 1925, drawing 0-0 against Ideale, Foggia inaugurated the new field on Via Ascoli (not yet fully completed). Meanwhile, the Foggia B team was created, i.e., the reserves, who played in different leagues from the first team.

In the 1926-1927 season, it played in Group D of the Southern Prima Divisione, and with the issuance of the Viareggio Charter, Foggia was able to sign two foreign players, but could only field one per match, thus purchasing the Hungarian Babaj, a centre-half, who corresponds to the first foreigner in Foggia's history; additionally, the acquisitions of Giuseppè Poli and Giovanni Visentini were made from Fulgor of Molfetta. These players would prove to be the most important of the season, especially Poli. He was the Italian pentathlon champion in 1928, the decathlon runner-up, and a professional swimmer. Additionally, winger Raffaele Costantino, who would later wear the Azzurri shirt, was rejected by Foggia after playing only two friendlies, the first won against Bagnolese, and the second drawn 1-1 with a goal by Babaj from a free kick, in the first-ever match against Napoli.

The team started the championship well, but the sale of players such as Babaj weakened them. For example, the away match against Liberty Bari was suspended due to darkness at a score of 1-1. The match started 42 minutes late and was played by Foggia with only 10 players due to the absence of Visentini and Alessandro Sarti, who were involved in a car accident. The match was played with eight starting players, one substitute, and Migotti, who played for only 20 minutes. Meanwhile, the figure of goalkeeper Renato Sarti, known as "Il divo", became increasingly important at Foggia, coming close to a national team call-up.

Foggia finished seventh at the end of the championship. However, following the exclusion of Ilva Bagnolese, Casertana, and Pro Italia Taranto from the championship, Foggia effectively finished fourth.

In the 1927-1928 season, Foggia had a new president, Giovanni Sarti, and a new role, that of player-manager, filled by Severino Rosso, as well as important new signings such as Giovanni Storchi and Ettore Zini. Foggia's debut in the Derby of Apulia against Bari was unfavorable, but the season soon improved as they defeated Fiorentina and won the return derby. For that occasion, the Italy national team manager Augusto Rangone was present in the stands to watch Renato Sarti of Foggia and Raffaele Costantino of Bari. However, since Costantino was a soldier, the Foggia managers contacted a marshal who prevented him from playing. Following their away win against Tivoli, Foggia's success waned, ultimately finishing fourth in the Southern Prima Divisione.

On 19 June of the same year, it merged with Velo Club and changed its name to Unione Sportiva Foggia.

The following season, Foggia did not play in the Second Division, but in a special championship, the Campionato Meridionale. Pasquale De Biase was the original president, but he was later replaced by Luigi Turtur. The field on Via Ascoli changed its name to Sportivo del Littorio, and the manager was changed to Severino Rosso. A significant recruitment initiative was launched. Giuseppe Giustacchini and Ettore Mussi were purchased from Ambrosiana-Inter, and Giovanni Pavanello was acquired from Viareggio. Pavanello would become one of Foggia's greatest goalscorers. However, Edmondo Della Valle was sold to Juventus, and Giosuè Poli stopped playing. The championship was a head-to-head race between Foggia and Pippo Massangioli, and it went so well that Foggia organized a home friendly against Wacker Wien, which ended 2-1 for the Austrians. In the end, Foggia and Pippo Massangioli both finished the group on 19 points, and the subsequent play-off between them ended 1-1. However, the Federation admitted both teams to the final group. This did not go well for Foggia, who finished third after beating Palermo 2-0. The only player who found success was goalkeeper Renato Sarti. In the summer, he was called up by manager Carlo Carcano for a trial with Alessandria. In Zurich, he saved a penalty kick from Max Abegglen.

In the subsequent Prima Divisione season, managed by the Direttorio Meridionale, Foggia changed its manager again, this time to the Hungarian Béla Károly, the first foreign manager on the red-and-black bench. Furthermore, Renato Sarti came close to being called up by Italy for the match against Switzerland, where at the last minute Ezio Sclavi was preferred, causing an uproar in the newspapers, such as Il Piccolo (now Il Giornale d'Italia). At the start of the season, Foggia signed Eligio Vecchi from Mantova and Alfredo Marchionneschi from SPAL, a favourite of manager Karolj. The team's performance in the pre-season was impressive, as they emerged victorious in all five matches. The championship also got off to a good start. Foggia scored five goals against the national team's goalkeeper, Clemente Morando of Messina. A strange episode occurred against Macerata. Marchionneschi scored a penalty, but the referee wanted it retaken. Vittorio De Rosa took the retaken penalty and scored after the goalkeeper saved it. However, referee Trama from Torre Annunziata was convinced that De Rosa had hit the crossbar and did not award the goal. While the Foggia players continued to protest, the Macerata player Filippi scored and the referee awarded the goal. Foggia filed a complaint and obtained a replay, which Macerata later won 3-2. The most important match of the season was won 1-0 away against Cagliari, but Foggia did not continue to excel, eventually entering a crisis. The crisis ended when the red-and-blacks managed to beat Palermo at home 2-1. At the end of the championship, Foggia finished second, level on points with Nocerina (which would later fold) and Messina.

In 1930, the first anthem of Foggia was composed.

The 1930-1931 season kicked off with a friendly home game against Bohn Sport Club of Budapest, invited by Karolj, which ended 3-0 for the visitors. The championship started well, as the debut in Brindisi was very convincing: Foggia won 7-2 with 5 goals from Marchionneschi. However, after Renato Sarti retired on November 9, 1930, in a match against Bisceglie that ended 3-2 in favor of the red-and-blacks, Foggia's success came to an end. Giuseppe Baldi replaced him, and despite Marchionneschi's 27 goals, Foggia finished the championship in third place. The "Satanelli" (Little Satans) moniker was coined by journalist Mario Taronna and became synonymous with the Foggia players.

During the 1931-1932 season, the team conducted a major overhaul of its roster, signing Aldo Bedogni, Raggio Montanari, Arduino Marchetti, and Antonio Silgich. Furthermore, Ferdinando Nardella became president in early October.

Foggia had a good season, but by the end of February, due to the poor performance of Aldo Bedogni and Raggio Montanari, they finished in the middle of the table. Nevertheless, the team achieved a remarkable feat by finishing second in the standings, only three points behind Perugia. Consequently, they qualified for Group A of the final stage.

In the final stage, Foggia again finished second, missing promotion by one point, which was instead achieved by Grion Pola.

This season, striker Alfredo Marchionneschi set the Foggia record for most goals in a single championship with 29. Together with Montanari and Marchetti, he formed the trio known as the "Foggia of the 3 M's." This trio was responsible for 71 of Foggia's 94 total goals.

=== Promotion to Serie B in 1933 ===
Foggia was gradually growing, and things were changing. In the 1932-1933 season, the manager was changed to Tony Cargnelli. Furthermore, Marchionneschi and Marchetti, protagonists of the previous season, were sold and replaced by Antonio Bellotti. Another signing was that of Fioravante Baldi, later a starter for the Grande Torino. The season began with a 6-0 home win against Tosi Taranto, and a 2-0 away win against Bari's reserves. A friendly was also played against Bari's first team on 28 October 1932, to celebrate the tenth anniversary of the Fascist Regime, which ended 5-1 for Foggia, with a hat-trick by Montanari, while for Bari the goal was scored by the ex-player Marchionneschi. The first defeat came only in the ninth round, against Napoli's reserves, but with the mid-season transfer window, Foggia further strengthened with the signing of winger Giorgio Pitacco, and by the end of the season, they had only lost three times. Foggia finished first in the standings, qualifying for the final group. The start was poor, as it was defeated in Ferrara against SPAL, but with victories over Pavia and in the return leg against SPAL, Foggia, with 5 points, won the final group, and thus the red-and-blacks, after various attempts, finally returned to Serie B.

Foggia had managed to participate in the 1933–34 Serie B championship, but first many things were changed. For economic reasons, the president changed to Paolo De Tullio; furthermore, Tony Cargnelli went to manage Bari, and Foggia selected Engelbert König, who had previously worked with Milan, to be the team's manager. In terms of transfers, Foggia brought back Arduino Marchetti from Novara, bought the two forwards Attilio Sudati and Benedetto Benedetti, and full-back Bruno Kazianka, but sold Bellotti, Montanari and Silgich. The season saw alternating performances, but some of these were important, such as the victory against Grion Pola 6-2, or the home derby against Bari of the ex-players Cargnelli and Marchionneschi, won by the red-and-blacks 2-1. Foggia finished Group B of the championship in seventh place.

In the 1934-1935 season, there was another change of presidency; Paolo De Tullio was replaced by Giovanni Quarato, and manager Koenig, like Cargnelli, went to Bari; another Austrian, Silvio Stritzel, was called to manage Foggia. The only noteworthy move was Montanari's return. The other players acquired, such as Alberto Rosso, Vittorio Torti, and Arturo Boniforti, were all young players. Many players left the team. Both goalkeepers, Giuseppe Baldi and Aristide Bossi, left for Pistoiese and MATER, respectively. Furthermore, Aldo Bedogni was sold to Reggiana, Bruno Kazianka to Manfredonia, Fioravante Baldi to Torino, and Arduino Marchetti to Torres Sassari. Because of all these departures, Foggia did not perform well in the championship, and towards the end of October, after four consecutive defeats and before the derby with Bari, Stritzel was dismissed and replaced by Giovanni Battista Rebuffo. His debut was convincing, and Foggia won the derby 3-1, but in the following matches he proved to be a disappointment. The red-and-blacks had a strong second half of the season, collecting 17 of their 29 total points, but they were forced to play in a playoff against Cremonese. Both play-offs were played on neutral grounds, the first in Ancona ending 1-1, while the second in Fano saw Foggia win 1-0 thanks to a goal by Benedetto Benedetti. The team finished eighth in Group B of the second division.

=== From relegation to Serie C to World War II ===
For economic reasons, Foggia was forced to sell players in the 1935-1936 season. They sold Attilio Sudati to Torino and Raggio Montanari to Livorno for a total of 65,000 lire. To renew the team, the presidency bought Giuseppe Calò and Riccardo Di Santo from Messina, Luigi Torti from Seregno and Marco Lorini from Sanremese. The midfield was entrusted to the young Vincenzo Marsico, who the previous season had only been fielded twice, but who would later become one of Foggia's icons. Vilmos Wilheim, a Hungarian coach, replaced the manager. The season started badly when, during the Novara-Foggia match, which ended 4-2 for the Piedmontese, winger Calò was injured and suffered a torn tendon. Foggia first attempted to replace him temporarily with Alfredo Galante, a player from the youth team, and then permanently with Dante Rossi, who was purchased from Savoia. After an unremarkable first half of the season, the second half was disastrous. Foggia suffered four consecutive losses, which impacted their final league position. By the end of the season, they were in thirteenth place with 28 points, tied with Viareggio, SPAL, and Pistoiese. The last opportunity to remain in the second division was the playoffs. Against Viareggio in Rome, the Tuscans won 2-0; against Pistoiese in Rome, the opponents won 6-0; and the match in Fano against SPAL was canceled due to Foggia's relegation. After three years in Serie B, Foggia was relegated to Serie C. The only satisfaction of that season came in the Coppa Italia derbies, where in the double-header the red-and-blacks eliminated Taranto in the third round (1-1 in Taranto and 2-1 in Foggia), but in the round of 32 they were eliminated at home by Roma 4-0.

The return to Serie B occurred after eight years in Serie C, as in those seasons Foggia had very inconsistent performances.

Béla Károly returned as manager for the 1936–37 season after managing Taranto the previous season. The poor economic conditions and the drop to Serie C forced, as in the previous year, a large number of sales, including that of Luigi Torti to Genoa, Ettore Mussi to Como, Pietro Lavè to Lecce, Giuseppe Calò to Molfetta, Benedetto Del Re to Rimini, Arturo Boniforti to SPAL, and Riccardo Di Santo to Manfredonia. Additionally, Giovanni Pavanello retired. The team did not undergo a major transformation with significant new signings, but nevertheless, full-backs Arcangelo Di Reda and Francesco Maggiori, and half-backs Alido Chiaruttini and Armando Creziato (later manager of Acireale) were purchased. The team's Coppa Italia run in 1936–37 ended in the second qualifying round. After eliminating Benevento 2–0 in the preliminary round and Bagnolese 4–0, the red-and-black squad lost 5–2 to Molfetta, with a hat trick from former player Giuseppe Calò. Group E had three teams from the Province of Foggia; the red-and-black team, Audace Cerignola, and Manfredonia. The dream of a return to Serie B seemed to be approaching with the victory over Potenza 1-0, where Foggia, second in the standings, was two points from first place. The next match was the Capitanata derby against Manfredonia, the first in their history, which ended 1-1, with the sipontini equalising in the final minutes. However, the possibility of returning to the second division remained ever-present, especially thanks to the steadily growing support of the fans. On March 14, 1937, in the match against Tosi Taranto, the stadium opened its doors to women for the first time, although they had to be accompanied. However, the hopes of a return to Serie B were dampened by the 3-0 home defeat to Salernitana and the subsequent 2-1 away defeat at Cerignola. There were only a few more victories, including the 4-0 win over Lecce. The team finished the championship in fifth place, in front of their home fans, who were forced to watch their team lose 5-2 to the newly promoted Taranto.

The 1937-1938 season was another significant one. Angelo Benincasa was brought in to manage the team, and Luigi Sbano was appointed president at the end of August by the secretary of the Fasci Italiani di Combattimento. Dante Rossi was sold to Padova, Ubaldo Narducci to Bari, and Vito Natale Labate and Arcangelo Di Reda to Spolettificio Torre Annunziata. The only signings were that of Adelchi Fariello, returning after his loan to Manfredonia, and Vasselli, a Roman pilot who worked at Amendola Air Base. Despite playing a great first half of the season and finishing in fifth place, the satanelli finished ninth in Group E with 20 points due to a poor second half. In the last five matches, the red-and-blacks suffered four defeats and collected only seven points. Foggia's poor second half was mainly due to the departures of Armando Creziato and Luciano Valenti, who enlisted in the military, as well as Fariello's disruptive behavior. During halftime against Popoli, Fariello argued with Benincasa and refused to return to the field, leaving Foggia with only ten players. Ultimately, this resulted in a 3-0 loss.

Luigi Ippolito became president in the 1938-1939 season. He was famous in Foggia for having been president of the Foggia Traders' Union for 30 years, vice president of the Italian Industrialists' Association of Foggia for 12 years, and president of the Foggia fair in 1953. Financial resources seemed to increase with the imminent sale of Vincenzo Marsico to Milan. However, Milan offered only 20,000 lire. Foggia asked for double that amount, so the transfer was canceled. To balance the few departures, there were a few signings: Luigi Caruso and Giuseppe Serio from Palermo; Ermenegildo Soci from Rimini; and Ilio Ganni from Livorno. Ganni would leave the team early after making only four appearances and scoring one goal. Walter Del Medico also arrived, and at 18 years old he played two matches. Later, from 1942 to 1944, he would wear another red-and-black jersey: that of Milan. At the beginning of the championship, the team suffered five consecutive defeats, all of which were away games, due to the construction of a 2,000-seat stand and an athletics track at the "Sportivo del Littorio" field. In an attempt to secure a win, Foggia relied on everything, including various superstitious strategies, such as wearing a green jersey against Mater. However, this idea proved unsuccessful. In December, the team earned its first championship victory in the Capitanata derby against Manfredonia. During the midseason transfer window, the satanelli signed the young striker Gilberto Zappaterra, who helped Foggia overcome their deficit and secure three consecutive victories. However, due to their poor performance in the first half of the season, Foggia could not avoid finishing in ninth place.

In July 1939, Unione Sportiva Foggia became Unione Polisportiva Foggia, as the club expanded to include athletics, cycling, basketball, boxing, fencing, and tennis.

Foggia's situation was not ideal. For the 1939–40 season, Enea Farina became president, and Benincasa moved to Brindisi. Foggia's new manager, former Udinese manager István Fogl, arrived from Brindisi. The notable signings included the return of Dante Rossi, while Caruso and the young prospect Del Medico were among the departures. The debut in the Coppa Italia was subpar; the red-and-blacks were defeated by Benincasa's Brindisi 5-1. Foggia suffered another setback when Raffaele De Meo, their full-back, was called up for military service. There was no victory until November 23, when President Farina left and was replaced by Oscar Taronna. Although the victory came in the ninth round, it seemed as if it were a repeat of the previous championship. In January, management strengthened the team by signing Giuseppe Bradaschia, who scored 13 goals in 16 games. Thanks to his efforts, Foggia avoided relegation, securing ninth place with 29 points, tied with Brindisi. On May 12, 1940, Foggia celebrated the twentieth anniversary of its foundation. The day began with races on the athletics track and ended with a 0-0 match between two Foggia veteran teams. Giuseppe Comei captained one team and Giosuè Poli captained the other. Roberto Fini served as the referee.

Although the Second World War had just begun, football did not stop. The 1940–41 season began under the leadership of acting president Roberto Fini. He was forced to sell 33 players and take players from the second and third teams. Filippo Guglielmi was elected president on July 30. He brought Ferenc Plemich, another Hungarian, to Foggia as the new manager. At the start of the championship, Foggia lost Chiaruttini to Vicenza. The only new players signed were young players from local teams, such as Falcone-Foggia. Journalists called the team the Foggia of the three B's: Ernesto Bertè, Giuseppe Bradaschia, and Giovanni Bratta. It seemed to be a team capable of aiming for promotion. Foggia got off to an inconsistent start with two wins and two losses. However, Plemich handed the team over to his predecessor, István Fogl. Foggia continued with its inconsistent performances, and at the end of December, Fögl left, and Plemich returned as Foggia's manager. Foggia had only two players not originally from Daunia, Soci and Bradaschia, who were also sold in the mid-season transfer window. However, the situation worsened for Foggia because some players, such as Umberto Caputo and Antonio Ragno, were disqualified. Caputo was banned for six months and Ragno for a year for playing a match under a false name and with a fake ID card. Foggia finished the season in tenth place, having been docked one point for forfeiting the final match in Syracuse.

For the 1941-1942 season, Roberto Fini returned as president and hired Angelo Benincasa, who had returned to Foggia, as manager. Foggia's roster was still made up mostly of local players, and the few departures were balanced by the few signings, most of whom also came from Foggia. The start of the championship was forgettable; only one point was obtained in the first six matches. The first victory came in December in an away match against Potenza. However, it was only minor satisfaction amidst further defeats, such as the 5-2 loss to Cosenza, with two goals from former player Sudati. The performance changed significantly in the second half of the season. Foggia improved, but could not do better than tenth place.

Alceo Gigli became president for the 1942-1943 season. Benincasa was reappointed, and after several seasons, the team began signing notable players again, such as former Serie A players Paolo Todeschini and Walter Zironi. Another important signing was the goalscoring winger Lischi. After scoring away at Brindisi, he left the pitch, leaving Foggia with only ten players. They were forced to endure the comeback of the salentini. Thanks to these additions, Foggia secured fourth place in the standings, keeping pace with Lecce, Taranto, and Cosenza. The war had a significant impact on football as well. Antonio Ragno was killed in Africa while driving a tank, and Walter Zironi was killed by the Nazis.

The red-and-black team was forced to stop for two years due to the Second World War, which brought death and violence to Foggia.

== Post-war Foggia ==
=== The post-war recovery ===
Very little football was played during the war. In Foggia, there were only a few active teams, such as Nuova Daunia and the Air Force team. In April 1943, the Air Force team faced the German representative team in Foggia.

In 1946, the "Sportivo del Littorio" field was named in memory of Pino Zaccheria, a Foggian basketball player who died in Tirana on the Greek-Albanian front.

Following a hiatus caused by the war, Foggia participated in the Campionato Dauno, one of the many wartime championships. On September 2, 1945, the red-and-blacks won the championship in San Severo against Lucera in extra time.

Only a few days later, Foggia merged with G.S. Cartiera and changed its name to IPAS Foggia (Istituto Poligrafico Associazione Sportiva Foggia).

In the 1945-1946 season, Roberto Fini returned as president. After the war, Foggia registered for the Serie C championship. However, the costs were high, and Foggia only managed to sign Nevio Giangolini. Attilio De Brita and Guido Citarelli were also important. They were young then, but would later become key figures for the Satanelli and, in Citarelli's case, for Bari as well. The team had a strong start to the championship, even beating the league leaders, Lecce. However, in March, during the derby against Audace Taranto, fans invaded the pitch at the Zaccheria Stadium in the 87th minute with the score tied at 1-1. The violence continued into the locker rooms, resulting in serious consequences: the referee and some Audace players were hospitalized, and the Zaccheria Stadium was sanctioned for 10 months. Despite finishing fourth, Foggia had the opportunity to earn a promotion based on sporting merits due to the new reforms aimed at expanding the championships.

While awaiting the final verdict, Foggia reverted to its original name, Unione Sportiva Foggia. Luigi Formica was appointed extraordinary commissioner, and the ban on the stadium was lifted. Financially, the red-and-blacks only had the economic support of the Union of Winemakers, the band, and the Umberto Giordano Conservatory. Subsequently, on July 7, when the league schedules were drawn up, the Lega Centro-Sud admitted Foggia to Serie B for the 1946–47 season based on their sporting merits. Thanks to the repêchage, the red-and-black team could resume their activities in grand style for the 1946–47 season by participating in Group C of the second division. Antonio Frezza became president and chose Pietro Andreoli as manager. To compete with the other teams, the team made several signings, including goalkeeper Antonio Bisson from Trento, center-half Luigi Buin from Bonifacese, half-back Giovanni Calvani from Bari, full-back Antonio Maran from Padova, and wingers Michele Catalano from Molfetta and Antonio Spatuzzi from Asti. Financial possibilities increased, and advertising boards were introduced pitchside for the first time. That year, a new team, Foggia Incedit, appeared in Foggia's group. Foggia Incedit was the team of the Foggia paper mill, and its colors were yellow and blue. On September 19, journalist Mario Taronna created the newspaper Il Satanello, which focused on the red-and-black team. Despite a good start in the championship, where the red-and-blacks beat the league leaders, Salernitana, with a goal from Spatuzzi, Foggia did not have a great second half of the season. Having reached penultimate place in the standings, Foggia's management dismissed Andreoli and hired Raffaele Costantino, whom Foggia had famously rejected as a player. With Costantino, Foggia returned to winning ways until the relegation match against Catanzaro. In the 78th minute, with the score tied at 1-1, Catanzaro player Venditto kicked the ball, which hit the post and came back into play. To everyone's astonishment, the referee awarded the goal, which caused a brawl to break out. Subsequently, Catanzaro was awarded a 2-0 victory by forfeit. Another refereeing injustice occurred the following week, when Foggia was denied an obvious penalty in the 90th minute of their home match against Palermo. This condemned Foggia to relegation. Foggia finished fourteenth in the group and was relegated to Serie C once again. Due to the clashes in Catanzaro, the Lega Nazionale excluded Foggia from all official matches until July 31, 1948.

In July 1947, after various protests from Foggia fans, the FIGC reduced Foggia's one-year disqualification to just four matches, and thus the team participated in Group S of the 1947–48 Serie C championship. Foggia's return to the third tier was not so fortunate, as the team found itself competing with Incedit for local supremacy. Incedit was managed by former Foggia player Vincenzo Marsico. The red-and-blacks changed coaches, handing the position over to the Hungarian Lajos Politzer. Politzer only signed three players: Virginio Nicoli, Bruno Torri, and Alfredo Diotalevi. However, thanks to the latter and to the young winger Attilio De Brita, Foggia was able to climb the standings and establish itself as one of the top teams. On December 28, the first official derby between Foggia and Incedit took place, ending with a 1-0 victory for the canarini. After that loss, however, Foggia recovered by beating the league leaders, Catanzaro, as well as San Severo and San Ferdinando di Puglia, with an aggregate score of 14-0. Despite losing to Nicastro, Foggia reached first place, tying with Incedit in points. More victories came in February with the return of Angelo Benincasa and the unexpected dismissal of Politzer. In the second half of the season, the red-and-black team won 12 out of 13 matches (eight in a row) and tied one, finishing first in the standings. Meanwhile, Incedit had to settle for fourth place. In early June, a structure at the Pino Zaccheria stadium collapsed, resulting in three deaths. In response, Foggia and Incedit organized a friendly match on June 6, donating the proceeds to the victims' families.

However, in a twist of fate, Foggia was not admitted to Serie B on July 1 due to the law reducing the number of teams in the league and championships. Foggia Incedit, which had finished fourth, was relegated to Promozione for the same reason.

Thus, in the 1948-1949 season, Foggia was forced to continue playing in Serie C despite finishing in first place the previous year. Bruno Torri and Michele Catalano were replaced by Arnaldo Leonzio and Berardo Lanciaprima, and other minor signings were completed. The season was rather unremarkable, partly due to the aging of Alfredo Diotalevi, the rossoneri's only notable striker. Notable results included a 1–0 victory over Crotone, in which Benincasa first experimented with the WM formation, and a 3–0 win over the league leaders, Avellino, who were later relegated for sporting misconduct. At the end of Group D of the Serie C championship, Foggia finished sixth. The other Foggia team, Incedit, also finished sixth in the interregional promotion league.

In the following season, 1949-1950, Foggia was considered one of the favorites, thanks in part to a coaching change. András Kuttik, who had led Cosenza to fifth place in Serie C the previous season, was hired as the new coach. Under him, Foggia changed its tactical formation, definitively adopting the WM formation after some attempts by Benincasa the previous season. Foggia aimed to rejuvenate the squad and was active in the transfer market, signing striker Vincenzo Geraci, Hungarian full-back Pal Kovi, midfielder Giorgio Sbardellini, and full-backs Vincenzo Ferrante and Giorgio Lazzeri, while selling veterans Carlo Ponzanibbio, Alfredo Diotalevi, Antonio Pultrone, and Michele Catalano. In September, the rossoneri lost 3–1 in a friendly against I.R.O., which a year later would become Ferencváros. The season got off to a good start, with Foggia beating Catanzaro 4–1 at home. However, after two disappointing home derbies—a 3–1 loss to Lecce and a 1–1 draw with Brindisi—Kutik was replaced on 30 October by Foggia native Vincenzo Marsico. Marsico was the first Foggia-born coach to sit on the rossoneri bench. During a coaching course in 1948, he and Cesare Gallea tied for first place, finishing ahead of Nereo Rocco, the legendary AC Milan coach. Marsico's debut, which ended in a 1–1 draw, was in Sicily against Messina. Following another tie and two straight losses, Foggia fell to the bottom of the standings, particularly after a stunning home loss to Juve Alfa Pomigliano. This prompted President Frezza to fire Marsico and rehire Kuttik. Kuttik's return began with a 6–3 loss to Crotone. However, Foggia beat Nocerina at the Zaccheria and then defeated the league leaders, Messina, at home with two goals from Vincenzo Geraci. Geraci would later become the group's top scorer with 24 goals. The team seemed to recover, but President Antonio Frezza resigned on January 8 due to an economic crisis that was not helped by the then-mayor of Foggia, Paolo Telesforo. Ferdinando Nardella was appointed as extraordinary commissioner. For the first time, a merger between Foggia and Incedit was considered to pool economic resources. The financial crisis impacted the team's performance. Foggia lost 4–0 to Brindisi. On March 16, before the match against Arsenal Messina, coach Kuttik was replaced again by Vincenzo Marsico, who was coaching Incedit. After an unfavorable debut at Cosenza, where the satanelli lost 5–0, Foggia recovered, winning five matches and drawing two. Foggia concluded the championship in ninth place, despite having the most prolific attack of the season.

For the 1950-1951 season, Foggia increased the stadium capacity to 10,000 seats by expanding one stand and building a new one, additionally creating an underpass, new changing rooms, and repairing the perimeter wall damaged during the Second World War. Financially, resources were scarce, and President Nardella was forced to appoint a new board of directors. There were many departures, including Bisson to Trento and Buin to Salernitana, while notable signings included Marino Brenco from Bari, Marino Di Fonte from Arsenaltaranto, and Luigi Silvestri from Lecce. After a victory on the neutral ground of Syracuse against Igea Virtus Barcellona, the team coached by Marsico suffered a resounding 8–0 defeat in the away derby against Lecce. However, with the return of midfielder Buin, the rossoneri achieved a series of positive results, and by December the team was third in the standings, four points behind Stabia, later closing the gap to reach second place. Subsequently, Foggia obtained 15 positive results in a row, a streak interrupted by a 4–1 defeat to Marsala. After signing full-back Bruno Cappellini in March, the Zaccheria hosted the direct clash between Foggia and Stabia, which ended 2–0 for the rossoneri. After many changes in the standings, the season ended with Foggia and Stabia tied for first place with 52 points each. A playoff was therefore scheduled for 17 June in Florence, which ended 2–0 for the Campanian team. The fans were unhappy with the result and accused coach Marsico of not playing starting goalkeeper Rino Pandolfo. Subsequently, Marsico was dismissed on June 24.

In the following season, 1951-1952, Tony Cargnelli returned as coach, eighteen years after his last stint with the rossoneri, while Marsico first became coach of Lallo Madami in Bari and then, during the season, replaced Costantino at Bari. Luigi Silvestri, who had scored 24 goals the previous year, was sold to Arsenaltaranto for 3 million lire, and Giovanni Bratta, after 180 appearances for Foggia, was released and joined Incedit. Midfielder Giuseppe Pozzo and striker Nerone Reddi were signed from Spezia, while full-back Glauco Buttazzoni was loaned from Udinese, and other minor signings were completed, such as goalkeeper Agostino Scaglioni from Acireale and midfielder Giovanni Di Pasquale from Biellese. Foggia's season began on August 18 with fitness training on the track and technical-tactical sessions at Gino Lisa Airport because the stadium's pitch was being resurfaced. Before the start of the championship, winger Enrico Candiani was signed from Livorno. He had already won the Italian championship with Cargnelli's Inter and had played for Juventus and Milan subsequently. However, it was clear from the start that it would not be a great season for Foggia due to its lackluster performances. Even after signing striker Antonio Aiello from Padova in the winter, Foggia continued to disappoint until December 9, when they lost the home game against Colleferro, prompting President Nardella to step down and appoint extraordinary commissioner Antonio Frezza. Frezza then returned to lead Foggia, immediately dismissing Cargnelli and appointing Cesare Migliorini. The debut seemed promising, with the rossoneri winning 2–1 away against Casertana; but unfortunately for Foggia, what seemed a victory turned into a defeat. Without being contacted by any Foggia official, Silvio Brioschi, Casertana's coach, asked his goalkeeper, Scarpellini, to play below his abilities. Scarpellini subsequently reported everything to the federal authorities. The League then relegated Foggia to last place with 0 points and awarded Casertana a 2–0 win. Brioschi was banned for life. The new extraordinary commissioner Vittorio Alberini, before being replaced shortly after by Pasquale De Biase, stated that Brioschi had never had contact with the rossoneri management. Due to the League's repeated postponement of decisions regarding this episode, Foggia continued to do what it could, achieving mixed results. In the end, Foggia received a 14-point penalty and, with a total of 20 points, finished sixteenth and was condemned to relegation to the fourth tier. The only positive aspect of that championship was the 3-1 away victory against Bari in the derby. Foggia remained in the fourth tier for six years.

=== Relegation to the Fourth Division ===
The 1952-1953 season started badly, as on 5 July the extraordinary commissioner Pasquale di Biase resigned, leaving his position to Ferdinando Nardella. The club's debts amounted to over 23 million lire, and to try to balance this difficult financial situation, every Foggia member had to pay a fee. However, Commissioner Nardella's resignation at the July 30 assembly left the club at risk of dissolution. In early August, significant financial aid came from the Municipality of Foggia, especially from its mayor Ferdinando Lupo, and subsequently, another helping hand was provided by all the citizens of Foggia, who each contributed 5,000 lire to the club. The mayor appointed Raffaele Apicella as president, who hired Vincenzo Marsico as coach. His first signing was goalkeeper Antonio Cortigiano from Bari, but other major signings were also completed, such as strikers Nibbio Bacci, Aldo Piani, and the young seventeen-year-old Carmine Buonpensiero, and especially the highly experienced midfielder Vincenzo Orlando, also acquired from Bari. The start of the championship was unremarkable. The only noteworthy event occurred on November 16, when Nerone Reddi scored in the 66th minute of the Brindisi-Foggia match, which ended 2–3. His goal was the 1,000th in the history of the rossoneri. The situation improved slightly with the winter transfer market, where Foggia signed midfielder Antonio De Vitis and striker Cosimo Luzzi from Arsenaltaranto. The final defeats to Frosinone, Colleferro, Bari, and Campobasso prevented Foggia from returning to Serie C. Ultimately, the rossoneri finished third, three points behind the promoted teams, Avellino and Colleferro.

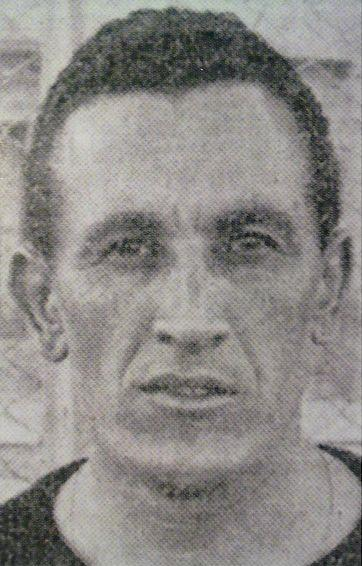
Nibbio Bacci, who experienced a second youth at Foggia.

The 1953-1954 season also began with financial difficulties, and with over 14 million in debts, Foggia seemed unable to register for the championship. However, in a meeting at the Town Hall at the end of June, the rossoneri management devised a project: the creation of three categories of members: benefactors, supporters, ordinary members. Subsequently, after an appeal to the city by Mayor Lupo, Foggia was also helped by the municipal administration and the citizens. The role of extraordinary commissioner was entrusted to Mayor Ferdinando Lupo, who managed to revive the club, while Vincenzo Marsico moved to Incedit, leaving the coaching position to former player Cesare Migliorini. The "veterans" Cortigiano, Leonzio, Buin, Reddi, and Di Fonte left and were replaced by young midfielders Severino Gorini from Pisa, Ferruccio Pavarano from Forlì, and Sergio Ballarin from Piacenza. Additionally, two goalkeepers were signed: Mario Rossi from Mantova and Piero De Pinto from Cosenza, the latter acquired due to Rino Pandolfo's injury. The squad was further rejuvenated with the arrivals of strikers Gualtiero Marchiani from Villanova Rovigo and Sergio Rizzini from Margherita di Savoia. The championship began with two away matches in Sardinia, both of which the team won: the first against Monteponi Iglesias, won 2–1, and the second against Olbia, which ended 10–0, the best result in Foggia's history. Victories continued to come, and the management considered further improvements through additional signings, such as midfielder Piero Micucci from Fiorentina and winger Franco Volpi from Bologna. After four consecutive wins, Foggia had a slight dip in form, losing two consecutive matches in the final minutes against Frosinone and Nocerina. Immediately, the rossoneri bounced back with two victories against Torres and Montevecchio, and in November, Foggia established itself at the top of the table. By the end of the first half of the season, the rossoneri could boast that they were the Italian team with the most wins (11 out of 15) and the most goals scored (38). However, after an impressive long series of injuries, Foggia seemed to falter. After leading the second-placed team, Cirio Napoli, by only one point, Napoli obtained a victory against Avellino and an away draw against Puteolana, thus finishing top of the table and qualifying for the final Centro-Sud group against Bari, Prato, and Colleferro. The team performed less brilliantly in the final group than in the championship: Foggia lost all its matches and finished last in the group with zero points. The team had to remain in the fourth division for another year.

Towards the end of June before the start of the 1954-1955 season, Nemes Lajos Kovacs, who was in his last season at Avellino, became the coach. From the Campanian club also arrived Pasquale and Carlo Mupo, brothers who played as a striker and full-back, respectively; Gloriano Rizzo, a striker; and Vincenzo Pulcinella, a midfielder. In addition to them, the club completed other signings such as midfielder Antonio Stornaiuolo from Cavese, goalkeeper Simone Despal from Nocerina, and midfielder Pietro Colombo. Initially, the signing of a young Carlo Parola appeared highly likely, but his transfer was hindered by his commitment to military service. Among the most important departures were those of Giuseppe Pozzo, who moved to Incedit, and Sergio Ballarin, who ended up at Forte dei Marmi. However, after a home defeat suffered against Molfetta, Commissioner Lupo, after fining almost the entire team, continued to complete signings such as winger Fabrizio Bartolini from Modena and midfielder Piero Gola from Mantova. Despite this, Foggia continued to perform poorly in the championship until December 1, when Kovacs was replaced by Leandro Remondini. Upon his arrival, Remondini signed the young Paolo Maroncelli from Lazio.

=== From the return to Serie C to the golden years of Serie A ===
==== Years of consolidation ====
In the 1958-1959 season, after the merger of the two Foggia clubs and the repechage in Serie C, Foggia had to raise the sum of 15 million lire for registration in Serie C. Eventually, the money was lent by the Banco di Napoli, and the rossoneri, after six years, could return to playing in Serie C. Armando Piccapane became president and made a few signings, such as goalkeeper Bruno Furlan from Colleferro, defender Marco Galetti, and winger Francesco Malinghetti, the latter two acquired from Salernitana. The returns from loan of midfielder Piero Colombo from Avellino and midfielder Matteo Rinaldi from Squibb Roma were also important, while the captain and flagship player of Foggia, Attilio De Brita, retired from football. The team's Coppa Italia run began with a 3–1 home victory over Cirio Napoli. However, a week later, the rossoneri were resoundingly defeated 5–1 by Bari away. The team got off to a rough start. By the end of October, they had only won two matches (against Anconitana and Lecce) and lost four in six matchdays. Coach Marsico was replaced by his assistant, Osvaldo Iannantuoni, for a very short period due to poor health. Subsequently, Leonardo Costagliola took over and immediately began renewing the team. Thanks to him, the following players arrived at the reopening of the transfer list: winger Domenico La Forgia from Cagliari, midfielder Alberto Baldoni from Pistoiese, and goalkeeper Dante Bendin from Bologna. The signings seemed to give a notable boost to the team; however, the first victory of the Costagliola era came against Trapani, after four draws and two defeats in a month and a half. Nevertheless, under Costagliola, the rossoneri's performance improved, and he was reappointed, thanks in part to some convincing performances in March. Foggia finished Group B of the championship in twelfth place with 27 points, without, however, ever winning away from home. In this season, however, there was no danger of being relegated to Serie D (the new IV Serie), due to the new league reforms.

The 1959–60 season marked their triumphant return to Serie B. Costagliola immediately sought a replacement for Bendin, whose loan period with the rossoneri had ended, and found Renzo Biondani, acquired from Salernitana. A young man arrived from Secondigliano who would become one of the satanelli's legends: Cosimo Nocera. The previous season, he had been the top scorer in the Campanian group with 28 goals. Nocera arrived for one and a half million, after rejecting various offers, including those from Cirio Napoli, Casertana, and especially from SPAL, with which Nocera had almost reached an agreement. For 5 million, striker Marcello Panattoni also arrived from Rapallo(with the ruentini he had scored 25 goals in 30 matches), after snatching him from the competition of Juventus and Bologna. Subsequently, the attack was further adjusted with other signings, including those of Cesare Peruzzi and Giampiero Merlo from Chieti. The defense was strengthened only with the acquisition of Luigi Despase from Campobasso. Alberto Allegretti and the young Vincenzo Faleo were loaned to Chieti, and La Forgia left the rossoneri to join Molfetta. With a budget of 15 million, President Piccapane managed to build a team capable of earning a promotion to Serie B. The championship debut was in Caserta against Casertana, and coach Costagliola was doubtful about Nocera. In the end, Nocera was put in the game and secured the first victory of the season with a brace, winning 2–1. Thanks to Merlo, the rossoneri also won against Cosenza. However, the following matchday, they narrowly lost (2–1) to Barletta away, missing two penalties. Foggia continued to impress until Siracusa, coached by Oronzo Pugliese—who would become a rossoneri legend in the following years—arrived at the Zaccheria. The Sicilians had achieved impressive away victories, and they won in Foggia as well, despite being held for 49 minutes by a goal from Nocera. For Costagliola, there was still a need to improve, and he signed winger Francesco Patino from Venezia. Meanwhile, the satanelli distinguished themselves with their humanitarian initiatives. They donated 50,000 lire to Giovanni Bratta, Foggia's star player in the 1940s, who was suffering from a football-related illness. Bratta passed away on September 14th. They also played a friendly towards the end of November against Roma, with the proceeds donated for the construction of the Casa Sollievo della Sofferenza in San Giovanni Rotondo. The rossoneri continued to shine until the fourteenth matchday in Agrigento against Akragas, when they won and took the lead in the standings.

However, on the next matchday, Foggia lost 3–0 to Trapani away, allowing Cosenza to catch up with the Daunians. Foggia made it to the second half of the season with two victories, one against Chieti (2–0) and the other against Crotone (1–0 on the field, but 2–0 by default). After beating Casertana 2–1, they faced Cosenza in a direct clash that ended in a draw. With this result, the rossoneri could continue to pull away from their pursuers. Foggia seemed destined for promotion, even though they suffered some defeats, such as two consecutive ones in Sicily, against Marsala and Siracusa. After these setbacks, Foggia returned with a 3–0 victory over Teramo, which allowed them to extend their lead over Cosenza, who had lost on Avellino's field. At the same time, Nocera's signing seemed particularly fitting, as he scored another brace against Avellino, leaving Marsala and Cosenza three points behind. After other victories, the away derby with Lecce arrived, which Foggia lost 3–2, but the gap from Marsala remained unchanged due to the latter's defeat at Crotone. There was also tension in the next match, where the Apulians drew 1–1 with Akragas at home. The rossoneri dominated the match, but risked losing towards the end. Subsequently, after beating Trapani, Foggia fell at Chieti, but the direct competitor for promotion, Marsala, did not take advantage of the opportunity, losing in the away derby at Trapani. Foggia, with a two-point lead, played the last match at the Zaccheria against Crotone and, thanks to a goal from captain Antonio Stornaiuolo, won and celebrated promotion to Serie B after thirteen years.

For the 1960-1961 season, Foggia rejected important offers, such as 30 million for Nocera and 15 million for Despase from Bologna, and for Rinaldi, contested by Cosenza, Marsala, Pescara, and Taranto. An economic contribution was provided by the Provincial Council, which signed the guarantee for the club's registration in the championship and also promised a monthly contribution. Among the signings, those of Giorgio Longo, a midfielder with 18 goals in the last season, acquired from Maglie, stood out. Full-back Angelo Bertuolo arrived from Barletta in exchange for Buonpensiero and Peruzzi. Meanwhile, Udinese's midfielder Giorgio Odling was bought for 13 million. Finally, Fiorentina's full-back Giampiero Bartoli was acquired for 12 million. Furthermore, Franco Diamantini arrived from Fano and Carlo Orlandi from Maceratese, both midfielders. In addition to Buonpensiero and Peruzzi, Alberto Allegretti was sold to Barletta, and Elio Grappone and Vincenzo Pulcinella returned to Avellino. In the Coppa Italia, Foggia reached the second round after winning 1–0 after extra time in Catanzaro, but was eliminated by Bari. The team's start to the championship was not brilliant. Due in part to Nocera's temporary absence for military service, Foggia remained second to last in the first eight matches, earning only five points. The team's first victory came in November with a 1–0 win over Reggiana, thanks to a goal from Nocera. For the winter transfer market, winger Manlio Compagno arrived from Roma. However, Foggia was in a moment of crisis, and President Piccapane, together with the board of directors, resigned; but the decision was only temporary, as it was revoked shortly after. Furthermore, midfielder Maurizio Thermes arrived from Roma and midfielder Piero Fiorindi from Verona, while Panattoni returned to Rapallo, but only on loan. The situation did not change, and after a 3–0 away defeat to Marzotto Valdagno, Piccapane paired Paolo Tabanelli with Costagliola, but very shortly after, Costagliola left his position entirely to Tabanelli. Immediately, the first victory of the Tabanelli era arrived against Catanzaro, but on 5 February at the Zaccheria, Foggia played against Venezia. After conceding two penalties to the Venetians and with a quarter of an hour remaining, the two teams were tied 1–1, when referee Cirone validated a goal by Raffin tainted by a handball, and the Foggia fans, angry, tried to assault the referee. Immediately, the match was awarded 2–0 to Venezia, the Zaccheria was banned for three matchdays, and after a defeat at Monza, Foggia sank to last place. Even though they obtained a victory on the neutral ground of Caserta against Alessandria and managed to snatch a point away at league leaders Mantova, on 21 March, a few days after the away defeat to Sambenedettese, Tabanelli resigned. Costagliola returned as coach, but there were too few remaining matchdays to avoid relegation. Despite a 2–1 victory against the new league leaders, Messina, on the neutral ground of Naples, the rossoneri were relegated to Serie C again. The stint in the second division lasted only one year. As in previous years, Foggia struggled to establish itself in Serie B; every time the team was promoted, it was relegated the following year, except for the 1934–35 and 1935–36 seasons, the only two consecutive ones in Serie B.

The 1961-1962 season began with a shocking announcement: Nocera was close to joining Napoli, which had offered 30 million, but the negotiation stalled also thanks to Foggia's new coach Oronzo Pugliese. More bad news came from the end-of-July meeting: Piccapane resigned, and an increase in municipal contributions for the players' salaries was requested, along with an extension to the registration deadline. Foggia recruited players from various teams in the Marche region. Midfielder Antonio Santopadre and midfielder Antonio Ghedini arrived from Ascoli, goalkeeper Gastone Ballarini came from Vis Pesaro, and midfielder Franco Danova and winger Vittorio Morelli arrived from Arezzo. Antonio Stornaiuolo, after seven years with the rossoneri, decided to leave and join Avellino, and Giampiero Merlo ended up at Reggiana. Meanwhile, on 16 July, Foggia's secretary, Medardo D'Angiò, died at the age of 70. He had been a member of the club since the 1925-1926 season and was replaced by Osvaldo Iannantuoni, also a former member of Foggia and coach for a very brief period in the 1958-1959 season. The season began with a crushing 3–0 victory over Reggina, who were reduced to seven men due to three expulsions and one injury. Then, they drew away against Trapani and were defeated by Akragas at Agrigento. The rossoneri immediately bounced back, and on 15 October they beat the league leaders Tevere Roma, who had a perfect record, and after reaching second place, they won the away derby against Barletta. In the following derby at the Zaccheria against Taranto, the team had the opportunity to become league leaders, but after a missed penalty by Despase, the match ended 0–0. Meanwhile, on November 4, the team was taken over by Domenico Rosa Rosa, an entrepreneur and timber industrialist from Castellammare di Stabia.

The catch-up came a few weeks later, on 12 November, with the victory over Chieti. The squad was further strengthened with the signings of striker Giampiero Turci from Cremonese and full-back Roberto Corradi from Milan. On November 19, the rossoneri won against Pescara and took first place. A few matchdays later, the gap between them and Salernitana widened to three points thanks to the latter's draw with Marsala. However, after suffering defeats at Syracuse and Lecce, Foggia's pursuers increased to four: Akragas, Lecce, Salernitana, and Taranto.

Later, on 14 January, Foggia won another away derby against Bisceglie, becoming the winter champions. Foggia's first match of the second half of the season ended in defeat at Reggio Calabria. This result brought Lecce to within one point of Foggia, who were experiencing a particularly difficult period, exacerbated by their loss in Rome against Tevere. The most important match of the season arrived on March 11: Foggia faced Salernitana at the Zaccheria. After being two goals ahead, the rossoneri were caught up, but thanks to a late goal by Santopadre, they secured an important victory. A week later, Foggia suffered another defeat, this time at the hands of second-to-last-place Chieti. Meanwhile, Lecce caught up with them in the league standings. Driven by pride after this event, the rossoneri did not disappoint again. They went on to win against Pescara, who was coached by former Foggia coach Costagliola. This victory brought Foggia back to the top spot, two points ahead of the other teams. One last setback occurred with the away defeat to Potenza, a direct competitor for promotion. Potenza closed the gap with the rossoneri to within two points, while Lecce drew level with Foggia. Taking advantage of two consecutive home matches against Marsala and Siracusa, Foggia reclaimed the lead with two points over Lecce, before the direct clash at the Zaccheria. However, at the Zaccheria, Foggia was beaten 2–1, with two matches remaining. Following their last defeat, Foggia easily defeated Bisceglie. Meanwhile, Lecce drew 1–1 with Potenza. On June 3, Foggia won 2–1 against San Vito in Benevento with goals from Nocera and Rinaldi, thus sealing their return to Serie B.

Before the start of the 1962-1963 season, fans were not convinced by the squad, which led to various controversies.

Despite the controversies, Foggia conducted a noteworthy transfer campaign: for the defense, Ambrogio Valadé and Antonio Bettoni arrived from SPAL, the first a full-back, the second a sweeper; but the midfield was the most reinforced department with the signings of Roberto Oltramari (loan with option to buy), a winger from Rimini, Paolo Lazzotti from Fiorentina, and Cataldo Gambino from Salernitana, bought for 33 million. The first competition to be played was the Coppa Italia; the first round was easily overcome with a decisive 3–0 victory over Modena, while the second round saw, for the first time in history, Juventus at the Zaccheria, who won 2–0 thanks to two own goals by Odling. The championship began with some difficulties; the debut was a 2–2 home draw with Lecco, and the following matchday the rossoneri were defeated 4–2 at Padua. The first victory came on the third matchday with a score of 1–0 thanks to Nocera's goal against Brescia. This opened a cycle of six consecutive victories, the most important of which was against Udinese in Udine, where the Satanelli won 7–2. Nocera and Oltramari each scored hat tricks in this match, while Udinese fielded the future world champion goalkeeper, Dino Zoff. Upon returning from Friuli, Foggia was swamped by fans, proud of the victory, and maestro Ottavio De Stefano composed the rossoneri anthem, called Forza Foggia cha-cha-cha. However, Pugliese's plans suffered a slowdown, caused by a 4–1 away defeat to Lazio, and they closed the first half of the season in third place with 23 points. The second half of the season was not as good as the first, but thanks to the strong performances of Bari, Messina, and Lazio, who were promoted, Foggia only managed to finish in fifth place with 43 points, delaying their promotion to the top division. Cosimo Nocera was the top scorer with 24 goals.

==== Foggia in Serie A ====
===== Promotion to the top flight =====
The 1963-1964 season was historic for Foggia, as Rosa Rosa and Oronzo Pugliese managed to promote the team to Serie A for the first time. The team's roster changed little; the only notable addition was goalkeeper Giuseppe Moschioni, who replaced Biondani after his move to Rimini. Furthermore, Roberto Oltramari was bought out permanently. The team's start to the championship was not promising; after an unconvincing debut victory over Cosenza, the rossoneri suffered two consecutive away defeats, first to Cagliari and then to Padova. However, these losses were followed by two home victories against Lecco and Prato.

At this point, Foggia played at Catanzaro, but was defeated by the giallorossi 1–0, in a match that left many doubts about the new team managed by Pugliese. That was one of the last defeats of that season; from there, the rossoneri remained unbeaten for twenty-four matches, from 3 November 1963, i.e., from the home draw with Parma, to 3 May 1964, when the rossoneri were defeated in Naples 3–0. In their winning streak, Foggia did not lose to any of their direct competitors, such as Varese. They earned 34 points (10 wins and 14 ties), equaling the unbeaten record set by Grande Torino in the 1940s. Following their defeat in Campania, Foggia earned a tie at the Zaccheria against Triestina and a 1–0 victory over Udinese, thanks to a goal by Lazzotti. With five matchdays remaining, Foggia was at 43 points. For mathematical promotion, they needed another three points. One came in the away draw with Potenza, and the other two were collected in the 4–1 victory over Pro Patria. In that game, Nocera scored a hat trick. The rossoneri did not put up much of a fight in the remaining matches. Foggia was defeated at Alessandria and at Varese, with the Lombards already promoted to Serie A. In the meantime, Padova, which was aiming for fourth place, lost at home, further distancing itself from Foggia. The last match at the Zaccheria against Venezia was meaningless in terms of the standings. Foggia was defeated, yet there was still a celebration in the stands for securing third place with 46 points. This result earned them a promotion to the top flight after 44 years.

The Satanelli were eliminated from the Coppa Italia in April. After home victories over Catania in the first round and Catanzaro in the second round, the rossoneri were eliminated at home in the third round by Roma.

Another highlight of the rossoneri's successful campaign occurred at the start of summer, after they earned promotion to Serie A. Foggia won Class B of the Cup of the Alps, a competition for third-place teams in the Italian and Swiss second division championships. They beat Thun 8–1 on June 28 at the Zaccheria and 4–3 on July 4 in Switzerland, securing their first trophy in club history.

The victory against Grande Inter

On January 31, 1965, Foggia unexpectedly defeated Herrera's Inter Milan, the reigning European and Italian champion that had just won the Intercontinental Cup. Oronzo Pugliese, the "Wizard of Turi," orchestrated a tactically perfect match and won the Seminatore d'Oro, a prestigious coaching award, that same season. Everything happened in the second half. Foggia opened the scoring early on thanks to Lazzotti. A few minutes later, Nocera shook the stands of the old Pino Zaccheria Stadium. Inter Milan equalized with goals from Peiró and Suárez, but Cosimo Vittorio Nocera wrote the final page of this remarkable chapter in Foggia's history in the 33rd minute.

===== Serie A =====
After being promoted, Foggia managed to play three consecutive championships in the top flight. Coach Pugliese received another important recognition for the promotion to Serie A: the Seminatore d'Oro. For the 1964-1965 season, Foggia strengthened its defense by buying fullback Romano Micelli from Catanzaro and sweeper Vasco Tagliavini from Udinese. The team also strengthened its midfield by acquiring midfielder Dante Micheli from SPAL, winger Armando Favalli from Inter (who played his last season at Brescia), and midfielder Renzo Brotini. Furthermore, Foggia took another midfielder from Verona, Giorgio Maioli. In preparation for their Serie A debut, the Zaccheria stadium was expanded to accommodate 25,000 spectators. Two new stands were built and the athletics track was removed. Foggia's debut in Florence was lackluster. They were defeated 3–1 by Fiorentina, whose star player was the Swede Kurt Hamrin. Foggia took the lead four minutes into the game with a goal by Matteo Rinaldi, their first Serie A goalscorer. However, they were overtaken by Hamrin and Alberto Orlando, the top scorer that season, who scored two goals each.

The next match was against Inter, who would have to play the second leg of the Intercontinental Cup final four days later. The Milanese won the match 2–0. A week later, the Capitanata formation secured their first victory against Mantova with a goal by Francesco Patino. Vincenzo Faleo, the first Foggia native to play in Serie A with his city's team, made his debut in that match. Foggia obtained five positive results in a row, earning seven points. They subsequently remained in a stable position until the home match against Inter Milan, the world champions under Helenio Herrera. The match took place on January 31, and the stadium was packed with 32 million tickets sold. After a goalless first half, Foggia triumphed with a final score of 3–2. Nocera and Micelli were called up to the Italian national team for the May 1 match against Wales, in which Nocera scored the final goal, making the score 4–1. Later, Foggia achieved another significant victory at the Zaccheria against Juventus, thanks to a goal by Maioli. They concluded the championship with a home draw against Sampdoria and an away loss to Roma, ultimately placing ninth in the standings with 31 points. The total takings for the entire season were incredible, with more than 287 million lire earned. However, this festive atmosphere was interrupted by shocking news: Armanno Favalli had died in a car accident on his way back to his hometown of Cremona. Furthermore, Favalli had nearly reached an agreement with Juventus. Only his signature was missing from the contract.

Before the start of the 1965–66 championship, Pugliese left for Roma. His brother-in-law, Egizio Rubino, took his place. The previous season, Rubino had finished fifth in Serie B with Potenza, the team of Silvino Bercellino. The team did not change much. The only significant departure was Micelli, who was sold to Bologna for 100 million euros plus the contract of another full-back, Bruno Capra. Capra did not play much due to a serious injury. In a generous gesture toward the rossoneri, Inter president Angelo Moratti sold Armanno Favalli's brother, Erminio Favalli, to Foggia for 25 million, rejecting Alessandria's offer of 60 million. Furthermore, Foggia completed the signing of midfielder Romeo Benetti. However, at the last moment, Rosa Rosa decided not to buy him because Benetti had to leave for military service. This resulted in Benetti remaining with Taranto, who promised that he would finally join the rossoneri the following year. However, the Ionians did not respect this agreement the following season, selling him to Palermo instead. Furthermore, in August, at the beginning of the championship, the League put Micheli and Maioli on notice for failing to reach a financial agreement with the club because they requested a higher-than-normal salary. However, in response to Rosa Rosa's ultimatum, the two players conceded and aligned with the club, requesting a standard salary.

Foggia was immediately eliminated in the first round of the Coppa Italia after drawing 0–0 away with Potenza. The rossoneri's championship debut took place in Turin against Juventus. The match ended in a 1–0 defeat for the rossoneri and went down in history as the first championship match to feature a substitution. Due to goalkeeper Moschioni's injury, Rubino was forced to field Gastone Ballarini. Another defeat came fifteen minutes before the end of the next away match against Milan, who won with a goal by Angelo Benedicto Sormani. Foggia's debut at the Zaccheria, where the turf had just been replaced, was against Bologna, Inter's only rival in the Scudetto race. Foggia won 2–0, with goals by Capra and Lazzotti. The victory against Bologna would be one of the few highlights of the season, though the victories against Sampdoria (3–0) in February and Roma (1–0) in May are notable as well. Pugliese himself was the protagonist of a great gesture. In the first leg at the Olimpico, overcome with emotion, he headed towards Foggia's bench instead of Roma's. The rossoneri crowd welcomed him with great applause. Foggia lost many points on the road, but proved to be an impregnable fortress at home. The rossoneri conceded only five goals at the Zaccheria, a record that still stands today, although it has been equaled by Juventus and Cagliari.

The season's setbacks were due to Nocera's decline. In 23 matches, he scored only four goals. After playing in 132 consecutive matches, he missed the match against Catania due to injury.

The rossoneri finished the championship in twelfth place alongside Atalanta and Lazio. Foggia avoided relegation for the second time in its history, albeit with more difficulty. After the championship ended, Foggia participated in the 1966–67 Intertoto Cup but was eliminated in Group A3. In that group, Foggia competed with Go Ahead Eagles (the eventual group winner), Tilleur, and FC Sion. Foggia lost only in the two matches against Go Ahead Eagles and won the remaining ones. Roberto Oltramari had a strong performance in the tournament, scoring five goals. With the two goals he scored in the championship included, he became Foggia's top scorer of the 1965–66 season.

However, in the 1966-1967 championship, Foggia was relegated, and it was a tournament to be forgotten for the fans. Erminio Favalli was sold to Juventus in exchange for 70 million and center-forward Vincenzo Traspedini was the only player acquired during the summer transfer window. In the Coppa Italia, Foggia was eliminated in the second round after advancing from the first. The rossoneri defeated Catanzaro on the road but were defeated and eliminated at the Zaccheria by Vicenza in November. The championship started badly for Foggia, who lost 4–0 at home to Inter. Three days after the defeat to Inter, on September 21, Don Mimì Rosa Rosa passed away. In his place, Vincenzo Micucci was called to the position of interim president. The change in leadership did not bode well for the team. They were defeated 5–0 at Bologna and suffered another defeat at Vicenza the following matchday. They remained in last place in the standings with 0 points.

The first point of the season came in the home draw with Cagliari, followed by a victory against Venezia; however, these were only isolated incidents. Foggia continued to disappoint in subsequent matches until December 4, when they suffered an away defeat to Lecco. Rubino was then replaced by Luigi Bonizzoni after Nils Liedholm refused the position. After 10 matchdays, they had only collected three points, conceded 24 goals, and scored six. With Bonizzoni's debut, it seemed that Foggia had regained its footing with the victory over Mantova. However, their success was short-lived, and they ended the first half of the season with eight points. In the second half of the season, after the default defeat to Milan due to a bottle hitting Amarildo, Foggia achieved eight consecutive positive results. This streak began with a victory against Fiorentina, thanks to a goal by Traspedini. With two matchdays left, Foggia faced Lazio at the Stadio Olimpico in a relegation playoff. However, the biancocelesti won 2–1, sending Foggia to Serie B. The last victory, which was obtained against Atalanta at the Zaccheria, was useless. Foggia finished the championship in sixteenth place with 24 points, but the fans were bitter about the disastrous start that was only partially remedied.

It took Foggia three years to earn a promotion.

== Between Serie B and Serie A ==
=== The fight for promotion and the Coppa Italia final with the Fesce-Maestrelli duo ===
The 1967-1968 season featured a team of great champions, including Giorgio Maioli, Cosimo Nocera, and Ambrogio Valadé, as well as promising newcomers such as midfielder Giuseppe Pavone, who came from Panetti Barletta, and defender Giovanni Pirazzini, who came from Ravenna. In addition to the two youngsters, midfielder Giampiero Dalle Vedove arrived from Alessandria, as did attackers Claudio Montepagani and Roberto Rolla from Massese. However, the signing of future Serie A top scorer and Italian champion Giorgio Chinaglia from the Tuscan club fell through. The most important sale was Ballarini to Ravenna. Foggia did not even make it past the first round of the Coppa Italia, losing 1–0 to Palermo on neutral ground in Reggio Calabria. The start was not the best. Foggia only collected five points in nine matchdays. Meanwhile, on October 6, Antonio Fesce became president. The away match with Venezia took place on November 12, but regardless of the result, Bonazzoni's fate as Foggia's coach was sealed; he would have to leave. Foggia won 1–0 with a goal by Oltramari. At Mestre, President Fesce told Bonizzoni of his dismissal in a refined way, pairing him with Technical Director Serafino Montanari. After Bonizzoni's refusal to collaborate, Montanari became the coach. Building on Herrera's approach, Montanari revolutionized the team. He entrusted Pirazzini with the libero role, brought Gambino back, and replaced the "elderly" Nocera with Rolla. Furthermore, midfielders Francesco Carrera from Potenza and Luciano Zanardello from Treviso were signed during this period. Following their victory in Veneto, Foggia achieved fifteen consecutive positive results, earning 22 points and becoming one of the top candidates for promotion to Serie A. On March 10, Foggia faced Reggiana at the Zaccheria. The rossoneri took the lead with a goal by Rolla, but then Reggiana caught up with a goal by Fanello. Finally, in the 88th minute, Del Fabbro sealed the Apulians' defeat. Foggia was aiming for the last available spot, third place, but had to compete with Bari for it. Ultimately, consecutive away defeats to Pisa and Messina proved fatal for Foggia, and a further defeat on the penultimate matchday against Lazio cost them promotion by just one point. In the last matchday, Foggia defeated the league leaders, Palermo, in a match that was useless for the standings. It was the debut of Pavone, who was defined as the "new Mazzola" by the former coach of the rossoneri, Bonizzoni. With 47 points, Foggia and Bari tied for fourth place. Vincenzo Traspedini, the second-leading scorer of the tournament, scored 17 of Foggia's 40 goals.

The 1968-1969 championship marked the beginning of a new era under President Antonio Fesce and coach Tommaso Maestrelli, who would later win a scudetto with Lazio.

In addition to its historic members, Foggia was renewed with a series of additions, such as goalkeeper Raffaele Trentini from Frosinone, where he remained unbeaten for 1,208 minutes the previous season; full-back Eugenio Fumagalli from Novara; stopper Orio Luciano Teneggi from Catania; midfielder Pietro Camozzi from Modena; midfielder Paolo Garzelli from Livorno; and attackers Paolo Nuti, a center-forward from Verona, and Nello Saltutti, a winger from Lecco. Most of the new players were signed to replace those who were sold, such as Oltramari and Traspedini.

The signings were on point, and thanks to them, Foggia won Group 4 of the Coppa Italia. They eliminated Bari, Fiorentina (who became Italian champions that year), and Pisa. Foggia then qualified for the quarterfinals against Napoli. Maestrelli used a variant of the 4-3-3 system popularized by Pirazzini, in which a central defender changes roles and becomes a libero during the game. Foggia started well in the championship. In the first nine matchdays, they remained unbeaten, earning 12 points and conceding only one goal. Their first defeat came at home against Lecco. Promotion was a dream for the rossoneri, thanks to victories over Livorno and Monza. However, as soon as Foggia lost to Reggina, the race for the top spot ended. The satanelli finished the first half of the season with 22 points. Meanwhile, Foggia also advanced to the final group by making it past the quarterfinals. They beat Napoli in both matches, winning 2–1 at the Zaccheria thanks to goals from Fumagalli and Nocera, and 2–0 at the San Paolo, where Nuti scored twice. In the championship, Foggia did not play as well as before. In six matches, Foggia suffered four defeats. They left the championship aside and concentrated only on the Coppa Italia. The first match of the final group was played away against Torino. Foggia almost pulled off a stunning comeback, leading 2–0 until the 60th minute. However, they were eventually caught up, resulting in a 2–2 draw.

The following Sunday, Foggia faced Bari in the Derby of Apulia and won with a decisive 4–0 victory. However, this would be their only notable win of the championship, as the Rossoneri would focus solely on the Coppa Italia. In the cup, Foggia faced Cagliari at the Zaccheria. Foggia was in the lead until Riva scored in the 86th minute. The following year, the Sardinians—counting on Gigi Riva above all—would become Italian champions. At the Olimpico, Foggia faced Roma, who won with a decisive 3–0 victory, placing themselves alongside Cagliari at the top of the group. Meanwhile, the championship ended in a tie for eighth place with Perugia, with both teams having the same number of points. The tie occurred during a match on neutral ground in Taranto against Catanzaro, where Nocera scored his final goal with the rossoneri. Foggia tried everything to finish first in the group, but only managed a 2–2 draw against Torino at home. At the Amsicora in Cagliari, the rossoneri tied with a goal from Camozzi and took the lead with a goal from Rolla. However, Boninsegna caught up to them. With three minutes left, Foggia secured the victory with a goal from Saltutti. The outcome of the cup depended on the last match on June 29 against Roma at the Zaccheria. However, Roma won 3–1 thanks to a brace from Fabio Capello and a goal from Joaquín Peiró. For Foggia, Saltutti narrowed the gap, but it was too late to change the outcome. Thus, thanks to this success, Roma won the Coppa Italia with nine points, while Foggia remained at five. After an impressive performance, the youth team, led by Giuseppe Pozzo (who was already a Foggia player and assistant coach), also made a name for itself. They reached the final in Salsomaggiore, but lost to Brescia.

The 1969-1970 season was significant for Foggia because it marked their second promotion to the top flight. The team renewed the formation that reached the Coppa Italia final with important signings, including Alberto Bigon, Mauro Colla, Giuseppe Fusi, Franco Pezzato, and Luciano Re Cecconi, while selling Gambino to Barletta, Pavone on loan to Torino, and Nocera to Massiminiana.

Foggia won Group 7 of the Coppa Italia and had to compete in a playoff against Juventus to advance to the quarterfinals. They lost the match 2–1 in Rome. Foggia got off to a good start in the championship. In the first six matches, they earned 11 points, drawing only with Pisa. The rossoneri's great performance, despite playing with only ten men after Pirazzini was sent off at the Ferraris, is noteworthy. They won the match thanks to a brace from Bigon. The first defeat came on the seventh matchday in Emilia-Romagna against Modena, but it was only a minor setback. Foggia continued to shine, earning another 11 points in seven matches and reaching the top of the standings. During this period, Foggia set a record. In 14 matches, the rossoneri earned 22 points, surpassing Casale's 21 points under Enrico Migliavacca. After setting the record, Foggia experienced a decline at the end of the first half of the season. They earned only two points in five matches, losing to Mantova and Varese. Finally, at Livorno, Foggia suffered another defeat and lost first place to Varese. They were placed in second position, alongside Mantova and Reggina, with one point behind the league leaders. The beginning of the second half of the season was similar to the end of the first. After drawing with Atalanta and Genoa, Foggia lost to Catanzaro, causing an unsettled atmosphere. However, Maestrelli's future remained uncertain, especially after the subsequent draws with Cesena and Modena, as well as the 3–1 away defeat to Como. Nevertheless, Maestrelli did not give up. In the last ten matches of the tournament, they earned an impressive 15 out of 20 possible points. They also defeated the league leaders, Varese, 2–0 at the Zaccheria, with goals from Saltutti and Bigon. On June 14, the Italian national team, coached by Ferruccio Valcareggi, secured a spot in the semifinals with a victory over Mexico. Meanwhile, Foggia earned their return to Serie A after a three-year absence by defeating Livorno 3–1. The rossoneri were unbeaten at the Zaccheria, with 11 victories and eight draws. They were only defeated away, with five victories, eight draws, and six defeats. With 48 points, Foggia finished second in the standings, behind Varese (coached by Nils Liedholm) and tied with Catania, securing another historic promotion to Serie A.

=== Maestrelli's farewell and the yo-yo between Serie A and Serie B ===
The 1970-71 season was Maestrelli's last. In the meantime, he was awarded the Seminatore d'Oro for being the best coach of the recently concluded season. The most notable signings were midfielder Vincenzo Montefusco from Napoli and Piero Lenzi from Pisa. Among the departures were Teneggi to Pisa and Rolla to Spezia. The rossoneri ended up in last place in Group 7 of the Coppa Italia, earning no points.

The season started off well: The team had five consecutive draws with Torino, Milan, Napoli, Bologna, and Cagliari (the reigning Italian champions), and their first victory came against Catania at the Zaccheria, with a goal from Mola, who had just recovered from a serious injury. After six home matches, Foggia had accumulated seven points and was four points behind Napoli, who occupied first place. The first defeat came on the next matchday when Foggia lost 3–1 to Roma at the Olimpico. However, the rossoneri quickly recovered by beating Verona 2–0 at home and Lazio 5–1.

By the end of the year, Foggia was seen as the biggest surprise of the championship, having climbed to fifth in the standings. However, Foggia revealed the first small signs of unsteadiness at the end of the first half of the season, when they finished in the middle of the standings. During the second half of the season, the team appeared exhausted, which resulted in a significant decline and ultimately, relegation. Following their 1–0 victory over Roma, Foggia did not win again in the last eight matchdays of the championship. In this negative series, there was also a draw with Fiorentina, Foggia's main competitor for survival. According to the Foggia fans and major sports newspapers, the match was influenced by referee Riccardo Lattanzi. However, relegation seemed distant even on the third-to-last matchday when Inter defeated the rossoneri 5–0 in Milan, celebrating the Italian championship title with this victory. After drawing at home with Juventus, the rossoneri were defeated 3–0 by Varese on the last matchday, with Concetto Lo Bello's refereeing errors playing a significant role in the loss. In the stands, news had spread that Fiorentina had lost to Juventus in Turin, prompting a great celebration. However, the celebration was cut short by the final score of 0–0. Despite having the same number of points as Sampdoria and Fiorentina, Foggia was relegated due to its worse goal difference, finishing in twelfth place with 25 points. The relegation was unusual because it was rare for a team to be relegated with one match remaining in the championship, with five opponents behind them, and having lost only one home match (3–0 to Napoli). At the end of the championship, Fesce dismissed Maestrelli, who was sought after by both Lazio and Roma. Ultimately, however, Maestrelli chose the biancocelesti.

Ettore Puricelli was Maestrelli's successor for the 1971-1972 championship. President Fesce found Puricelli in Canada while Vicenza was on tour there and brought him to Lazio. The club was forced to sell Montefusco, Villa, and Maioli. However, the most important sale was Bigon, whom Milan wanted in exchange for Angelo Benedicto Sormani. Foggia refused the deal, though, due to Sormani's high salary. Foggia selected midfielder Giorgio Rognoni from Milan's roster, finalizing the deal at 170 million. Foggia also bought fullback Rodolfo Cimenti from Treviso and winger Ivano Bosdaves from Atalanta. Furthermore, at the reopening of the transfer window, Foggia bought playmaker Juan Carlos Morrone from Lazio. Standout players included Pellegrino Valente, a young defender who earned a spot in the starting lineup, and Giuseppe Pavone. Pavone and Nello Saltutti formed one of the most prolific attacking duos in the championship, scoring a combined total of 20 goals. In the Coppa Italia, the team finished in last place in Group 7, earning two points from home draws against Cagliari and Arezzo. From the beginning, it was clear that it would be a transitional year for the rossoneri. Due to inconsistent results, the team never managed to establish itself among the top teams. Noteworthy was the victory at the Zaccheria over Lazio, who were on the verge of promotion. Foggia finished the championship in eighth place with 41 points after achieving ten consecutive positive results in the second half of the season.

During the 1972-1973 season, Lauro Toneatto led Foggia. He had coached Bari the previous season without achieving brilliant results. In order to balance the budget, Fesce was forced to sell Saltutti. Initially destined for Napoli, Saltutti was subsequently sold to Fiorentina for 216 million plus the co-ownership of attacker Giorgio Braglia. Re Cecconi was sold to Maestrelli's Lazio for 210 million plus the contract of midfielder Giuseppe Trinchero. Toneatto used the income from these sales to carry out important market operations in person. In addition to Braglia and Trinchero, the rossoneri acquired the stopper Novilio Bruschini from Livorno and the center-forward Bruno Zanolla from SPAL. In October, Foggia bought midfielder Luigi Delneri from the Ferrara club to replace Paolo Garzelli, who was out for almost the entire season due to a serious injury. After strengthening the defense with Bruschini and overhauling the midfield with Trinchero, Villa, Delneri, and Rognoni, Toneatto entrusted Pavone and Braglia with the task of breaking through the opposing defenses. The championship kicked off with a win on the road against Monza, with Trinchero netting the decisive goal with just four minutes left on the clock. Foggia won at the Zaccheria against Reggina before drawing the away derby against Taranto. The next match was crucial for promotion and featured two direct competitors: Foggia, who played at home, and Genoa. However, Genoa prevailed with a 2–1 victory. The rossoneri recovered, but on the ninth matchday, Luigi Radice's Cesena defeated Foggia 3–0. Despite their victory over Lecco, the rossoneri's crisis continued during the last four matchdays of the first half of the season, when they collected only one point. In the second half of the season, Foggia recovered, collecting 19 points thanks to an eleven-game winning streak. Another notable record was set by goalkeeper Raffaele Trentini, who remained unbeaten for ten matchdays and 1,002 minutes until Giampietro Spagnolo of Reggiana ended his streak. With four matchdays to go, Foggia lost 2–0 to Mantova at the Zaccheria, leaving them only four points ahead of fourth place. The following matchday, Foggia drew 1–1 at Novara. In order to be promoted, the team would need to beat Como at the Zaccheria on June 10. The team's top scorer, Giorgio Braglia, scored the goal that put them in the lead against the Lombards in the second minute from a penalty. This goal secured Foggia's promotion to the top flight. On the last matchday, with everything already settled, the rossoneri lost to Varese.

After being promoted to the top flight in the 1973-74 championship, the rossoneri bought attacker Silvano Villa from Milan to replace Braglia, who returned to Fiorentina at the end of his loan. They also bought midfielders Franco Liguori from Bologna and Bernardino Fabbian from Inter following the sale of Trinchero to Reggina in October. Additionally, Foggia acquired the midfielder Elvio Salvori from Roma. Foggia closed the transfer market with a deficit of 740 million lire. To remedy the financial defaults, President Fesce—with the help of FIGC President Franco Carraro—managed to execute the contracts of the new signings. This saved the club, as at the time of purchase they would have had to pay only 30%, while the remaining two-thirds would have been paid through bank guarantees. The season did not start off well: Salvori got injured during the preseason. In their debut match, the rossoneri faced the reigning Italian champions, Juventus, coached by Čestmír Vycpálek. The rossoneri took an early lead with a chip shot from over forty meters by Pavone. However, they were caught off guard by a penalty kick from Antonello Cuccureddu just before halftime and a goal from Roberto Bettega fifteen minutes from the end of the match. The following week, Foggia tied with Cagliari at the Zaccheria. The Sardinians took the lead with a goal by Riva, but the rossoneri avoided their second loss in a row thanks to a penalty by Silvano Villa. The first victory came in Florence against Fiorentina, thanks to another goal by Villa. In the next round, the rossoneri managed to tie with Cesena. Cesena had taken the lead with a goal by Ariedo Braida, but Liguori scored at the last minute to tie the game. Immediately after the break, Foggia was defeated 5–1 by Inter Milan, with Roberto Boninsegna scoring four goals. However, Foggia quickly recovered by beating Roma and starting a streak of seven consecutive wins. The Daunian team was one of the top contenders for a spot in the UEFA Cup. Their chances improved significantly in the "Derby of the South," when they defeated Napoli at home. This was their last positive result before suffering three consecutive defeats at the hands of Verona, Lazio, and Milan, thus concluding the first half of the season. The second half of the season began with a goalless home draw against Juventus, followed by a last-minute defeat at Cagliari. As in the first half, the first victory came against Fiorentina. However, Foggia fell into a crisis due to their losses against Cesena in Romagna, Inter at home (thanks again to Boninsegna, who scored twice), and Roma away. Subsequently, the rossoneri faced Sampdoria, who were last in the standings, at the Zaccheria. However, Foggia only managed a draw after taking the lead twice with goals from Rognoni. They were caught in the last minute thanks to a goal by Domenico Arnuzzo, who only scored once in his entire career. Foggia struggled to win consistently. First, they lost to Vicenza, led by former player Puricelli. Then, they were defeated by Genoa. During the game, Foggia goalkeeper Trentini held the ball outside the goal line. However, referee Stefano Trono ruled that the ball had crossed the line and validated the goal.

From there, the team earned four consecutive 1–1 draws against Torino, Bologna, Napoli, and Verona (Foggia's rival in the fight against relegation). With one matchday remaining, Maestrelli's Lazio relegated Foggia. With that victory, Lazio became Italian champions for the first time. In the last round, Foggia faced Milan. The match ended in a 0–0 tie after Villa's goal was disallowed. Meanwhile, the so-called Scandalo della Telefonata broke out. At the end of the match between Verona and Napoli on April 21, 1974, a Neapolitan newspaper reported on a phone call between Verona president Saverio Garonzi and Brazilian footballer Sergio Clerici. At the time, Clerici was Napoli's center-forward and had played for Verona. In the phone call, Garonzi promised Clerici that he would help him open a FIAT dealership in Brazil after his retirement. After reading this article, Foggia's managers went to the FIGC Investigation Office to request an investigation. They wanted to be readmitted to Serie A. At the end of the championship, Verona was saved, and Foggia and Sampdoria were relegated to Serie B, along with Genoa. The yellow-blue president, who was summoned by the Federal Prosecutor's Office, initially denied that the phone call had taken place. However, the player Clerici subsequently confirmed that the phone call had, in fact, taken place and provided details about it. At that point, Garonzi admitted that he had spoken. For Sports Justice, the director's denial during the initial interrogation and the details of the conversation were enough to determine Verona's relegation and Foggia's readmission to Serie A. However, Foggia itself became the negative protagonist of the second part of the scandal. Before the Foggia-Milan match, Apulian secretary Giuseppe Affatato tried to bribe referee Gino Menicucci of Florence and the two linesmen with three gold Rolexes. Menicucci indignantly refused and first told the Investigation Office, then the Sports Judge, everything that had happened. At the end of the first trial, Verona was penalized three points, which it served during the 1974–75 championship. Meanwhile, Foggia was penalized three points, which it had to serve in Serie B the following year. At that point, Sampdoria, who were second-to-last in the standings, appealed, claiming that Verona should be relegated to Serie B for committing sporting misconduct, and that Foggia should be penalized in the same championship, with the doriani being readmitted as a result. Ultimately, Verona was relegated to last place, while Foggia was relegated with a six-point penalty.

The penalty was decisive for Foggia's season. They were forced to play in Serie B for the 1974-1975 season, still with Toneatto as coach. President Antonio Fesce turned down many offers and refused to sell his players, renewing the team with new signings, including young players such as Carlo Bresciani from Fiorentina, Giovanni Lodetti from Sampdoria, Giuseppe Doldi from Inter, Renato Sali from Reggina, and Fabio Enzo from Novara. Foggia's championship debut was not one of their best. They only managed one victory against Pescara in seven matchdays. During the autumn transfer period, Foggia signed two midfielders: Fausto Inselvini and Sergio Borgo, both from Lazio. Despite the last-minute defeat against Palermo, President Fesce continued to express confidence in coach Toneatto. Things seemed to improve with a victory over Spal, a draw with Parma away, and another victory over Genoa. Carlo Bresciani was the protagonist in the Genoa game, scoring two goals. Subsequently, other victories followed against Arezzo and Verona. However, after these positive results, Foggia's performances were rather inconsistent, forcing the club to dismiss Toneatto. A European champion was brought in to replace him as coach: Cesare Maldini. Maldini's debut was not the best. He lost 1–0 at Alessandria and then drew 1–1 at home with Reggiana. After these results, many fans wanted Toneatto back as coach. Ultimately, Maldini was unable to revitalize the team, which was struggling with many lackluster performances. The team finished seventh in the standings, tied with Genoa. They had no away victories but also no home defeats. Furthermore, the rossoneri were unbeaten for eight consecutive matches. At the end of the season, Carlo Bresciani was named the top scorer in Serie B, having scored 13 goals. He was also awarded the Sportsmanship Prize for Serie B. Furthermore, the rossoneri's under-23 team, coached by Roberto Balestri, also made a name for itself, losing to Inter in the two-game final.

The following season, 1975-1976, saw the sale of Raffaele Trentini, Carlo Bresciani, and Peppino Pavone; the important signing of Aldo Nicoli; and the return of Luigi Delneri. It also saw a lackluster start to the championship, followed by the dismissal of Cesare Maldini after a loss to Avellino. The assistant coach, Roberto Balestri, replaced him. Balestri managed to achieve the fourth promotion to the Serie A level on points with Genoa and Catanzaro, placing third due to goal difference.

The 1976-1977 Serie A season started badly for the team with the new coach, Ettore Puricelli, due to an unfavorable initial schedule. The team faced Inter, Perugia, Juventus, Bologna, Napoli, Roma, and Sampdoria. However, Foggia's only defeats in those matchdays were against Perugia, coached by Ilario Castagner; Juventus, coached by Giovanni Trapattoni; and Roma, coached by Nils Liedholm. Foggia did not score a single goal in four matches.

Foggia's first goal came against Napoli in a 2–2 draw, and their first victory came against Sampdoria. Subsequently, the schedule did not favor the rossoneri. They had two consecutive away matches, first against Fiorentina and then Lazio. They lost the first match 4–1 and tied the second 0–0. The home victory against Milan in the first half of the season was important. In the new year, Foggia suffered four consecutive defeats against Genoa, Catanzaro, Cesena, and Torino. They returned to their winning ways on February 6 against Verona, led by Ferruccio Valcareggi, with a final score of 4–1. Subsequently, Foggia earned a point in Milan against Inter, won against Perugia, lost to Juventus, and beat Bologna 1–0 in a match that ensured their survival, with a goal from Nerio Ulivieri. Foggia won the "Derby del Sud" against Napoli. Napoli had taken the lead twice, but ultimately lost 3–2. Nerio Ulivieri scored the winning goal. Subsequently, they tied with Milan and beat Genoa 2–1 in Genoa, but the following matches were crucial. With four matchdays left, Foggia played Catanzaro at home and won 1–0, overtaking Milan and Bologna in the standings. The next match was played away against the already-relegated Cesena. To obtain that victory, Foggia expended all their energy. They took the lead twice, only to be caught up, but in the end, they managed to win, thanks again to Nerio Ulivieri. This victory automatically secured Foggia's safety, but they lost the next two matches against Torino and Verona. The second half of the season was crucial for Foggia's survival. They were one of the top teams in terms of points gained, behind only Juventus, Torino, Bologna, and Fiorentina.

== From Serie A to Serie C in two years ==
=== Relegation to Serie B due to goal difference ===
The following championship, in the 1977–78 season, was not so fortunate. The start was terrible: a 6–0 loss to Juventus. However, the home debut against Fiorentina seemed to give the team some hope, as the match ended in a 1–1 tie, with Foggia earning a draw thanks to a goal from Nevio Scala. Against Roma, under the leadership of coach Gustavo Giagnoni, Foggia lost 1–0 to a goal by Guido Ugolotti, who would later become the Foggia coach. The following matches were Foggia's first two victories in the championship. They played Bologna and Torino at home. After losing to Milan and drawing with Genoa away, Foggia returned to winning ways against Pescara. Foggia seemed to be one of the most in-form teams in the championship, not one destined for relegation. Other positive signs were the away draw against Lazio and the home draw against Vicenza, but Foggia's decline began shortly thereafter. Foggia lost 5–0 in Naples and suffered a home defeat to Perugia. 1977 ended with the team in fourth-to-last place with ten points. Despite this, Foggia started 1978 with a victory against Atalanta, and it seemed as if the previous two defeats were due to a lack of focus on the part of Foggia. However, this was not the case. Foggia went on to lose to Verona away and to Inter Milan at home. The second half of the season started with a 0-0 tie against Juventus, during which Foggia was denied a penalty. Following two draws against Fiorentina and Roma, Foggia suffered three consecutive defeats: two away against Bologna and Torino, and one at home against Milan. The team sank to second-to-last place. Foggia tied Genoa, who were also fighting against relegation, 1–1 at home. However, they achieved two consecutive victories: one away against Pescara, ending 2–1, and one at home against Lazio, ending 3–1. They were defeated by Vicenza, then drew with Napoli, lost to Perugia, and won against Atalanta in Bergamo (2–1) and Verona (4–0). The last match was against Inter at San Siro. Inter won 2–1, and Foggia was relegated to Serie B on goal difference, despite being level on points with Genoa and Fiorentina.

=== The temporary farewell of Fesce and relegation to C1 ===
Following the team's relegation to Serie B, President Antonio Fesce left temporarily, and the presidency was handed over to Raffaele Augelli, a regional councilor of the Christian Democracy, and Pasquale Izzo. Foggia's strategy emphasized sales over signings. Eighteen-year-old Maurizio Iorio was sold to Torino. Bologna acquired Maurizio Memo, Antonio Bordon, and Renato Sali in exchange for Giuliano Fiorini. A swap was made with Lazio: Aldo Nicoli was traded for Ernesto Apuzzo. Elio Gustinetti was signed from Udinese, Roberto Bacchin from Novara, Giorgio Pellizzaro from Catanzaro, and Giacomo Libera from Atalanta. The new coach was Sidney Colônia Cunha, better known as "Chinesinho," and the 1978–79 season started badly. They were defeated three times in the Coppa Italia, against SPAL, Milan, and Catanzaro, but they managed to win against Lecce. The preseason was also poor. Foggia conceded five goals in a friendly match against Piacenza. However, the championship began with a victory in Ferrara against SPAL, whom they had lost to in the Coppa Italia just days prior. On the second matchday, Foggia was in first place with a perfect record after beating Sampdoria at the Zaccheria. The first defeat of the season occurred in Udine against the newly promoted team, Udinese, which would later rise to Serie A. Furthermore, Foggia faced two consecutive home derbies. The first was Foggia-Lecce, which the rossoneri won 2–0. The second was the Derby of Apulia, Foggia-Bari, which Foggia also won, 3–1. Foggia was again at the top of the table, along with Pescara. However, a few days later, they were defeated in Pistoia by Pistoiese. Then, they lost at home to Rimini but won in Nocera Inferiore against Nocerina. This was their last away victory of the season. Foggia seemed to be one of the favorites for promotion, but that dream vanished immediately. Another home derby, Foggia-Taranto, ended in a 1–1 tie. They lost to Sambenedettese in San Benedetto del Tronto, but won their last match of the first half of the season at home against Varese. Foggia did not win until the second half of the season. During the first half, they suffered two away defeats in Brescia and Palermo, as well as five consecutive draws against Cesena, Genoa, Monza, Cagliari, and Ternana. Lastly, Foggia lost 4–1 at the Stadio Adriatico in Pescara. The team returned to winning ways against SPAL, but fans were unhappy due to previous losses and the poor economic situation. They lost to Sampdoria, tied with Udinese, lost to Lecce again, and then tied in Bari.

Pistoiese emerged victorious in Foggia, and Foggia then had to settle for a draw in Rimini and secure a 3–0 triumph against Nocerina. However, Foggia only asserted themselves in the first half, as was evident in their tie with Taranto and loss to Sambenedettese. After drawing with Varese and losing to Brescia, Foggia found itself in the relegation zone. Negative results also came from the matches against Cesena and Genoa. Foggia lost to Cesena and only managed a tie against Genoa. The rossoneri also lost 2–0 to Cagliari at home and in Monza. By then, a rift had occurred within the club and the dressing room. Giovanni Pirazzini was sent off and suspended for six matchdays for insulting referee Alberto Michelotti, and there were numerous incidents among the fans. To maintain their hope of safety, a win against Ternana in Terni was necessary, but the game ended in a draw. Following the incidents in Cagliari, Foggia's pitch was banned, leaving only one match remaining against Pescara. The game was played in Naples on neutral ground and won by the biancazzurri, 2–1. Foggia was relegated to Serie C1. The only positive was that, following the fans' requests, Antonio Fesce returned as president.

== Between Serie B and Serie C1 ==
=== The return to the third tier ===
After 17 years, Foggia returned to the third division of Italian soccer. Thanks to presidents Domenico Rosa Rosa and Antonio Fesce, as well as coaches Oronzo Pugliese and Tommaso Maestrelli, this marked the end of an unforgettable era for fans. This cycle was revived later in the nineties with Pasquale Casillo and Zdeněk Zeman, who rekindled Foggia's passion for football. Giorgio Sereni became the new coach, and the team was completely overhauled, particularly in comparison to Bari. In exchange for more than a billion lire and Franco Fasoli, Vito Petruzzelli, Arcangelo Sciannimanico, and Costante Tivelli, Roberto Bacchin, Giacomo Libera, and Rosario Sasso were sold to Bari. Furthermore, the club brought back Fabio Enzo from Biellese and bought Stanislao Bozzi from Avellino. The 1979-1980 season began with the Coppa Italia Semiprofessionisti, in which the rossoneri reached the round of 16 before being eliminated by Nocerina. The championship start was rocky for Foggia, who alternated scarce victories with draws or defeats, even against teams at the bottom of the table. Midway through the championship, after drawing at home with Cavese and away with Benevento, President Fesce decided to change coaches, bringing back Ettore Puricelli. The results began to show. Foggia started a series of positive results, but then lost two away matches, one against Salernitana and one against Campobasso. After that, Foggia only lost to Reggina and achieved incredible results, such as victories against the league leaders, Catania and Livorno. Both home games ended in 2–0 victories. Subsequently, Foggia tied with Cavese in a match with many clashes between fans. The last match was at home against Benevento. Foggia returned to Serie B after only one year in C1 with a 2–0 win.

== Zeman's "Miraculous Foggia" ==
The period of maximum splendor for the club began in 1989 with the hiring of Czech coach Zdeněk Zeman. The Bohemian coach's aggressive and entertaining football style was based on the 4-3-3 formation, featuring a compact team, pressing, an offside trap, and frenetic movement of players and the ball. After returning to Serie A in the 1991–92 season, the Foggia dei miracoli proved competitive against any opponent and was appreciated by the press because it offered exciting games. The term "Zemanlandia" was coined to describe the team Zeman built. Even after selling many high-quality players (including the attacking trio of Giuseppe Signori, Francesco Baiano, and Roberto Rambaudi) and replacing them with young talents, Foggia finished two more Serie A seasons in the middle of the standings.

Zeman's move to Lazio marked the end of Zemanlandia, a concept born from the collaboration between Zeman's innovative coaching style, President Pasquale Casillo's entrepreneurial spirit, and Sporting Director Giuseppe Pavone's keen insight. However, his successor, Enrico Catuzzi, could not maintain the team's level of performance.

== Double relegation and promotion to C1 ==
The end of this era marked the beginning of Foggia's dark period, which culminated in consecutive relegations to Serie C1 in the 1997–98 season and to Serie C2 in the 1998–99 season. After spending four years in the lowest professional league, Foggia, under the leadership of coach Pasquale Marino and players Roberto De Zerbi and Michele Pazienza, found a winning setup in the 2002-2003 season and convincingly achieved promotion to Serie C1. Following a mid-table finish in the 2003-2004 season, Foggia Calcio went bankrupt for economic reasons, losing coach Marino and all the best players. The news devastated the fans, but Giuseppe Coccimiglio took over the club, restoring confidence: the new club took the historic name Unione Sportiva Foggia and maintained a spot in the league. After two more mid-table seasons and five coaching changes, Coccimiglio attracted criticism by failing to pay salaries, leading to instability. After complex negotiations, the club passed into the hands of a group of local entrepreneurs chaired by Tullio Capobianco in 2006.

== Serie C1 and the curse of the playoffs ==
=== 2006-2007 season ===
Following the possible arrival of Davide Ballardini on the rossoneri bench for the 2006-07 season, Stefano Cuoghi became the new coach. Cuoghi came from Salernitana and brought many granata players with him to Foggia. The previous season, these players had come close to promotion to B with Cuoghi. On January 21, 2007, Cuoghi was dismissed after six consecutive matches without a win. Salvo Fulvio D'Adderio became the new coach on January 23. The previous season, D'Adderio had coached Manfredonia. Under D'Adderio, the team won the Coppa Italia Serie C for the first time, closing with a 3–1 home victory over Cuneo in the final on April 25, 2007. They concluded the Serie C1, Group B tournament in fourth place with 59 points, qualifying for the playoffs.

In the playoff semi-final against Cavese, they won the first leg 5–2 at home but lost 3–1 in Cava de' Tirreni, advancing to the playoff final nonetheless. They prevailed in the first leg of the final with a 1–0 result against Avellino, but were defeated 3–0 in extra time in the second leg at the Partenio.

=== 2007-2008 season ===
After losing the playoff final, coach Salvo Fulvio D'Adderio was fired and replaced by Salvatore Campilongo, who had coached Cavese that year.

The start of the season was inconsistent, and the team closed the first half with 21 points, five points from the safety zone. In the second half of the season, Foggia earned ten points in five matchdays. Despite this, coach Campilongo was dismissed, and Giuseppe Galderisi took his place. With Galderisi, the team earned 19 points in eight matchdays, rising to sixth place. In the next three matchdays, they secured a spot in the playoff zone. On the last matchday, the rossoneri drew 0–0 with Ternana, earning fifth place and securing a spot in the playoffs.

On May 18, Foggia faced Cremonese at the Zaccheria Stadium for the first leg of the playoff semifinals. The match ended in a 0–0 draw. The second leg of the match ended in a 1–1 draw at the Stadio Giovanni Zini in Cremona. Since the away goals rule was not in effect, Cremonese advanced to the play-off final by virtue of their better placement (fourth place) during the season.

=== 2008-2009 season ===
Following the appointment of coach Raffaele Novelli, and an inconsistent start similar to the previous year, they were eliminated in the first round of the Coppa Italia by Barletta. They finished the first half of the season with 26 points. At the beginning of the second half of the season, Foggia obtained a series of nine consecutive positive results, gaining 15 points. The streak ended on March 29, 2009, with an away loss to Arezzo. However, a new streak began the following week with a win over Perugia, and Foggia continued this streak for seven weeks until the end of the championship. The away defeat to Arezzo turned out to be Foggia's only defeat in the second half of the season, setting the record for the fewest losses with six games lost, tying with Benevento. On the last matchday, Foggia, the underdogs according to predictions, managed to win against Crotone, who were second in the standings. Foggia obtained fifth place in the standings and thus accessed the play-offs for the third year in a row. However, the playoffs were unlucky for Foggia once again. After a 0–0 home draw against Benevento, the Apulian club drew 2–2 in the away return leg. Due to the standings position rule, Foggia was eliminated.

== A close call with relegation ==
=== 2009-2010 season ===
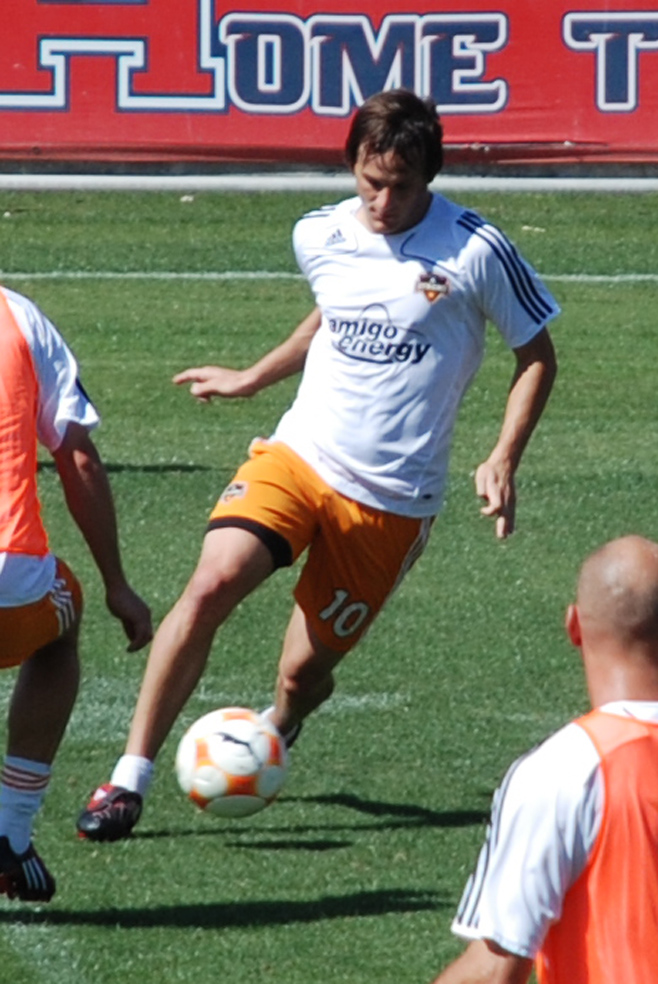
Thanks to Franco Caraccio's goal in stoppage time, Foggia avoided relegation.

On July 7, 2009, Antonio Porta was entrusted with the coaching role and Fabio Pecchia with the assistant coaching role. They were dismissed in March 2011 after the defeat in the derby with Andria due to a series of negative results. Guido Ugolotti was assigned the role of coach, and he rebuilt the team during the winter transfer window. The team managed to climb from the bottom positions but narrowly avoided relegation. The team secured their spot in the playoffs against Pescina VG, thanks to a goal by Franco Caraccio in the final minutes of a match that raised questions about its fairness (the match was marked by high tension, culminating in a threatening pitch invasion by local fans). At the end of the championship, the management announced their disengagement from managing the club, while former president Pasquale Casillo, from the glory years, announced his intention to return to the helm with a group of entrepreneurs. Meanwhile, L'Energesco, a Lazio-based renewable energy company, expressed interest in acquiring the Daunian club, but withdrew shortly after. At this point, Casillo presented a new offer for the club, as the first had been withdrawn. Meanwhile, the sole administrator, Francavilla, registered the team for the championship after appealing to Covisoc.

== From the return of Casillo and Zeman to bankruptcy ==
=== 2010-2011 season ===
On July 14, 2010, entrepreneur Pasquale Casillo and his group, led by his son Gennaro, returned to the helm of Foggia. Matteo Biancofiore was given the role of honorary president, and Zdeněk Zeman was brought back to the bench, while Giuseppe Pavone was brought back to the role of sporting director. On the first matchday of the Lega Pro championship, Foggia beat Cavese 3–0 with goals from Romagnoli, Varga, and Sau. Then, they suffered two defeats, losing 3–2 to Lucchese and 5–3 to Lanciano. A week later, Foggia tied Foligno 4–4 after being reduced to ten men at 2–4; they nearly took the lead in the 90th minute. Seven days later, Foggia won 2–1 at Barletta's home stadium, thanks to goals from Marco Sau and Lorenzo Insigne. The two players scored again on the sixth matchday at the home of Juve Stabia, where Foggia won 2–0. Despite the influence of the Bohemian coach, the team was too young and inexperienced and lost ground in the final matchdays. They failed to qualify for the playoffs. The championship ended with Sau as the top scorer with 20 goals. On May 23, 2011, Zeman declared his intention to leave the club in a press conference, disappointed with the results achieved. Despite President Casillo's attempts to persuade the Czech coach to change his mind, he remained firm in his decision.

=== 2011-2012 season ===
The 2011–12 season began on June 9 with the hiring of Valter Bonacina as the new coach. Bonacina was taken from Atalanta's youth team. The season was a failure, with the team constantly fighting to avoid relegation. During the championship, Bonacina was dismissed and replaced by Paolo Stringara. Stringara was then dismissed and replaced by Bonacina. The team was penalized four points and finished a disappointing season in eleventh place, just two points from the relegation zone. The club, which had been in serious difficulty for months, did not register for the subsequent Lega Pro championship.

== Promotion to Serie B, new bankruptcy, and revival ==
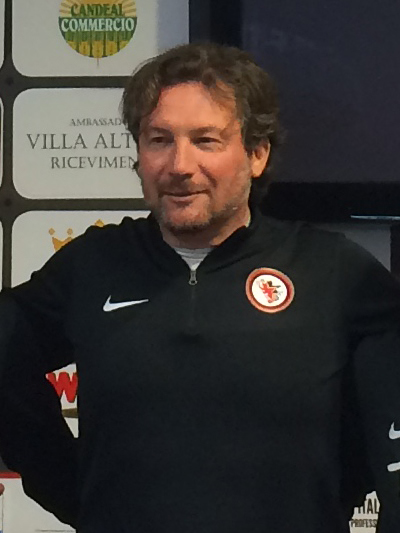
Giovanni Stroppa was in charge of Foggia from 2016 to 2018.

Due to U.S. Foggia's exclusion from professional football after being declared bankrupt on July 15, 2012, by the Court of Foggia, the Associazione Calcistica Dilettantistica Foggia Calcio was founded in the summer of 2012. The new team intended to adhere to article 52, paragraph 10 of the NOIF (Norme Organizzative Interne Federali) of the FIGC. The new team aimed to recall the tradition of the old team by adopting its social colors, including red and black striped shirts. Under the leadership of sporting director Giuseppe Di Bari, a former top-flight Foggia defender from the nineties, the team gained admission to the third tier, Lega Pro Seconda Divisione, in 2014, after being placed in Serie D by the federation in 2013. In the summer of 2013, the club changed its legal name to Foggia Calcio S.r.l. with the return to professionalism.

In 2014, Roberto De Zerbi became the coach of Foggia. Under his guidance, the rossoneri won the Coppa Italia Lega Pro for the second time by beating Cittadella in the 2015–16 double final. That same season, they finished second in Group C of Serie C behind Benevento and gained access to the playoffs. There, they eliminated Alessandria in the preliminary round with a 2–0 victory and Lecce in the semifinals with victories of 2–3 and 2–1. However, their goal of promotion to Serie B was thwarted in the double final against Pisa, who were victorious 4–2 at home before the 1–1 draw at the Zaccheria.

In August 2016, Giovanni Stroppa, another former Foggia player, was entrusted with the Daunian bench. On July 7, 2015, the company acquired the historic club brand that had disappeared two years earlier. In the 2016–17 season, the satanelli secured first place in their group, earning a return to Serie B after 19 years. They also won the Supercoppa di Lega Pro after defeating Venezia and Cremonese in a triangular tournament among the group winners.

Despite a rough start to the 2017-2018 season, Stroppa's team recovered in the second half of the championship to finish ninth. They narrowly missed the playoffs but comfortably avoided relegation. However, the 2018-2019 season was troubled. Initially penalized 15 points by sports justice — a penalty later reduced to six on appeal — Foggia recorded four wins, five draws, and five losses under coach Gianluca Grassadonia. Grassadonia was dismissed in December 2018, making way for Pasquale Padalino, who took charge of Foggia again after four years. Padalino was relieved of his duties in March 2019 after earning 12 points in 12 matches. Grassadonia returned but failed to avoid relegation to Serie C, which occurred on the last matchday due to a loss to Verona.

On July 25, 2019, the Municipality of Foggia assigned the sports tradition to the newly formed Calcio Foggia 1920 Società Sportiva Dilettantistica through a public tender based on article 52, paragraph 10 of the NOIF. The company inherited the city's sports tradition. Sardinian entrepreneur Roberto Felleca took over management of the club, while the technical management was assigned to Alessandro Faiolhe Amantino. Amantino resigned after the first matchday of the championship, making way for Ninni Corda. The season was suspended in March 2020 due to the pandemic. At the time, Foggia was in first place in Group H of Serie D, having collected 54 points in 26 matchdays. Given their superior points average, the Apulian club obtained promotion to Serie C.

During the 2020-2021 season, the players wore the celebratory centenary logo on their shirts. The season began with a 2–0 victory against Potenza, but Foggia suffered four defeats in the next four matchdays. The negative streak ended with a 1–0 victory in the Derby of Apulia against Bari, with Alessio Curcio scoring the winning penalty kick. The satanelli finished ninth in the standings and achieved their goal of avoiding relegation, qualifying for the playoffs. They were eliminated in the second round after the derby against Bari.

On June 26, 2021, Zdeněk Zeman officially returned to the Foggia bench for his third stint with the team. Following an active transfer period, Foggia debuted at the Zaccheria for the first round of the 2021-2022 Coppa Italia Serie C against Paganese. In the league, Foggia's debut was at the Enrico Rocchi against the newly promoted Monterosi Tuscia, where they were held to a draw. The season was inconsistent, with the team fluctuating between fifth and ninth place. The club finished seventh in the final standings and accessed the first round of the Serie C play-offs. After victories in the double rounds against Turris and Avellino, the run ended on Virtus Entella's field.

On May 26, 2022, Zdeněk Zeman left the Foggia bench and was replaced by Roberto Boscaglia. Following the 0–4 home defeat to Pescara on September 24, 2022, Boscaglia terminated his contract with the club. The team was temporarily entrusted to technical collaborator Antonio Gentile, who made his debut with a 1–0 loss to Taranto. On October 4, 2022, Fabio Gallo was appointed Foggia's new coach. He signed a contract until the end of the season and made his debut with a 2–0 loss to Gelbison. Toward the end of the season, Gallo resigned and was replaced by Mario Somma, who also resigned shortly after. The season concluded under the technical guidance of Delio Rossi, who led the Apulians to fourth place and qualification for the playoffs. In the first round of the playoffs, Foggia overturned the outcome after losing 4–1 to Audace Cerignola in the first leg. They defeated their rivals 3–0 at the Zaccheria in the second leg and advanced to the next round due to their better position in the regular season. The opponent in the second round was Crotone, who were defeated 1–0 in Puglia and held to a 2–2 draw in Calabria, thus being eliminated. The semifinals saw a confrontation with Pescara and their former coach, Zeman. There were two draws: 2–2 in the first leg in Puglia and 1–1 in the second leg in Abruzzo. After extra time, the match was decided by penalty kicks, and the Foggia players prevailed. Foggia was denied promotion after losing 2–1 at home and 3–1 away to Lecco in the final.

== See also ==
- Football in Italy

== Bibliography ==
=== Books ===
- Cicolella, Luca (1970). '70 A, cronistoria del campionato 69/70 ['70 A, chronicle of the 69/70 championship]. Editrice Leone Foggia.
- Cicolella, Luca (1971). '71 A, sospetto ['71 A, suspect]. Editrice Leone Foggia.
- Antonucci, Gianni (1998). 1908-1998 Bari con Ideale e Liberty [1908-1998 Bari with Ideale and Liberty]. Corcelli.
- Sammartino, Gianfranco; Troisi, Antonio (1991). Buon compleanno Foggia, 80 anni di ricordi, passioni, aneddoti, rivelazioni vissute e raccontate dai protagonisti [Happy birthday Foggia, 80 years of memories, passions, anecdotes, revelations experienced and recounted by the protagonists]. Edizioni Talienti.
- Almanacco illustrato del calcio. Panini Editore. 1939–2011.
- Giannelli, Luca (1997). Cento anni del campionato di calcio [One hundred years of the football championship]. Edizioni Scramasax.
- Cataleta, Giovanni (2004). Che si dice du Fogge? [What's up with Fogge?]. Utopia Edizioni.
- Cicolella, Luca; Spinelli, Giovanni (1963). Foggia Cha! Cha! Cha!.
- de Leo, Carmine (1992). Foggia in A, 1991-1992. Editrice L'Ulivo.
- Scopece, Leonardo (1993). Foggia. Storia di un campionato 1992-1993 [Foggia. Story of a championship 1992-1993]. Editrice L'Ulivo.
- Capone, Stefano; Sammartino, Gianfranco; Troisi, Antonio (1997). Foggia, tangenti e pallone. Politici, imprenditori, faccendieri e portaborse sulla giostra di Zemalandia [Foggia, bribes, and soccer. Politicians, entrepreneurs, wheeler-dealers, and aides on the Zemalandia merry-go-round]. Edizioni Del Rosone.
- Autunno, Pino (2010). Foggia, una squadra, una città [Foggia, a team, a city]. Utopia Edizioni.
- Santigliano, Filippo (1991). Forza Foggia. Books & News.
- Pennacchia, Mario (1964). Il calcio in Italia [Football in Italy]. UTET.
- Cicolella, Luca; Spinelli, Giovanni (1964). Il diavolo in paradiso [The devil in paradise]. Editrice Leone Foggia.
- Ordine, Franco; Signori, Giuseppe (1991). Il sogno di una A [The dream of Serie A]. Carlo Mancosu editore.
- L'almanacco del calcio italiano [The almanac of Italian football]. Rocco Curto Editore. 1994.
- Collettivo Lobanowski (2007). Juve o Milan? Meglio il Foggia [Juve or Milan? Better Foggia]. Rainoneeditore.
- Cicolella, Luca; Spinelli, Giovanni (1965). La ballata dei terroni [The ballad of the Southerners].
- Poli, Giosuè (1965). La fuga del tempo - Lo sport nella mia vita [The flight of time - Sport in my life]. Editoriale Olimpia.
- Cataleta, Giovanni (2001). Oronzo Pugliese. Quando nel calcio esistevano i maghi [Oronzo Pugliese. When wizards existed in football]. Utopia Edizioni.
- Calò, Peppino (1966). Retrospettiva del calcio [Football retrospective].
- de Meo, Nardino (1972). Sarti.
- Salvi, Sergio; Savorelli, Alessandro (2008). Tutti i colori del calcio [All the colours of football]. Le Lettere.
- Tutto il calcio minuto per minuto [All football, minute by minute]. European Book. 1981.
- Quirino, Valerio (2008). U' Fogg èjè nù squadron. Palmisano Edizioni.
- Domenico Carella, "Diavolo di un Satanello” , Il Castello Edizioni, Foggia, 2010
- Domenico Carella, “E il diavolo ci mise la coda. Storia di un amore rinato dall’incontro di cinque generazioni di ex calciatori rossoneri”, Il Castello Edizioni e Associazione EmmErrEventi Comunicazione, Foggia, 2013.
- Domenico Carella, “Gianni Pirazzini. Una vita da capitano”, Il Castello Edizioni, Foggia, 2014.
- Domenico Carella, “Foggia-Inter 3-2. 31 January 1965, the Feat of Pugliese's heroes”, Il Castello Edizioni, Foggia, 2014.
- Domenico Carella, “Il Foggia del '76. Il miracolo di Balestri, la vittoria di Pirazzini e Lodetti”, Il Castello Edizioni, Foggia, 2016.
- Domenico Carella, “Ciccio Patino. L'ala che fece volare il Foggia”, Il Castello Edizioni, Foggia, 2016.
- Domenico Carella, “Foggia 100, la categoria...un dettaglio”, Edizioni Fogliodivia, Foggia, 2020.
- Domenico Carella, “ZEMANLANDIA, quando il Foggia insegnò al mondo a giocare a calcio”, Sinkronia Edizioni, Foggia 2022

=== Videography ===
- Paolo Ziliani (17 September 2010). "Il Foggia delle meraviglie". La tribù del calcio. 17 minutes in. Premium Calcio.
- Documentary Zemanlandia, Giuseppe Sansonna, 2009
- Documentary Foggia 100, la categoria... un dettaglio, Domenico Carella, 2020
