= Romano Micelli =

Italian footballer

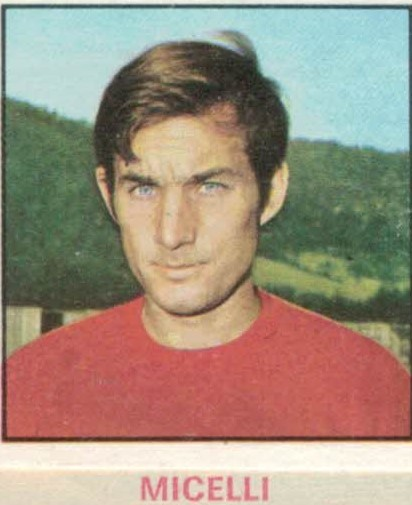

Personal information
- Full name: Romano Micelli
- Date of birth: 24 February 1940 (age 86)
- Place of birth: Basiliano, Italy
- Position: Defender

Senior career*
Years	Team	Apps	(Gls)
1959–1960	Monfalcone	25	(5)
1960–1961	Riunite Messina	2	(0)
1961–1964	Catanzaro	64	(3)
1964–1965	Foggia	32	(1)
1965–1966	Bologna	28	(3)
1966–1969	Napoli	26	(0)
1969–1971	Arezzo	46	(0)
1971–1972	Lignano	26	(0)

International career
1965	Italy	1	(0)
- * Club domestic league appearances and goals

Romano Micelli (Italian pronunciation: [roˈmaːno miˈtʃɛlli]; born 24 February 1940) is an Italian footballer who played as a defender. On 1 May 1965, he represented the Italy national football team on the occasion of a friendly match against Wales in a 4–1 home win.
