= Aldo Nicoli =

Italian footballer and manager (born 1953)

Personal information
- Date of birth: November 24, 1953 (age 72)
- Place of birth: Bologna, Italy
- Height: 1.78 m (5 ft 10 in)
- Position: Midfielder

Senior career*
Years	Team	Apps	(Gls)
1972–1975	Internazionale	29	(0)
1975–1978	Foggia	68	(3)
1978–1981	Lazio	26	(1)
1981–1983	Pescara	11	(0)

Managerial career
- ACF Milan
- * Club domestic league appearances and goals

Aldo Nicoli (born November 24, 1953) is an Italian professional football coach and a former player.

== Career ==
Born in Bologna, Nicoli began playing football with Internazionale. He made his Serie A debut against Sampdoria on 5 May 1974.

== Honours ==
- Serie A (women's football) champion as the manager of ACF Milan: 1992.
