= Severino Rosso =

Italian footballer and manager

Personal information
- Full name: Severino Rosso
- Date of birth: 13 December 1898
- Place of birth: Vercelli, Italy
- Date of death: 12 December 1976 (aged 77)
- Position: Midfielder

Senior career*
Years	Team	Apps	(Gls)
1920–1923	Legnano	30	(11)
1923–1926	Pro Vercelli	50	(11)
1927–1929	Foggia	14	(6)
1930–1931	Bari	5	(2)
1931–1932	Galliate	?	(?)
1932–1933	Saronno	?	(?)

International career
1924	Italy	1	(0)

Managerial career
- 1927–1929: Foggia
- * Club domestic league appearances and goals

Severino Rosso (Italian pronunciation: [seveˈriːno ˈrosso]; 13 December 1898 – 12 December 1976) was an Italian association football manager and footballer who played as a midfielder. On 6 April 1924, he represented the Italy national football team on the occasion of a friendly match against Hungary in a 7–1 away loss. He was also part of the Italy national squad for the football tournament at the 1924 Summer Olympics, but he did not play.
