= Ambrogio Valadé =

Italian footballer (1937–2007)

Personal information
- Date of birth: June 28, 1937
- Place of birth: Milan, Italy
- Date of death: September 14, 2007 (aged 70)
- Height: 1.73 m (5 ft 8 in)
- Position: Defender

Senior career*
Years	Team	Apps	(Gls)
1957–1959	Internazionale	18	(0)
1959–1960	Palermo	27	(0)
1960–1962	SPAL	21	(0)
1962–1970	Foggia	224	(7)
1971-1972	S.S. Maceratese 1922	32	(0)
- * Club domestic league appearances and goals

Ambrogio Valadé (June 28, 1937 – September 14, 2007) was an Italian professional football player. He was a defender for multiple teams, but mostly for the Calcio Foggia team during eight seasons from 1962, until 1970. He retired in 1972. Other teams in which he was part of before Calcio Foggia were Inter Milan, Palermo F.C., and S.P.A.L. He was part of S.S. Maceratese 1922 for one season after Foggia. He played in over 295 matches.

== Career ==
Valadé's first team was Inter Milan, which he joined in 1957. He had his first match when he was 20. He remained in Inter Milan for two more seasons, and in 1959 he joined Palermo F.C. Valadé was only part of Palermo F.C. for one season, and in 1960 he joined S.P.A.L, which he played for two seasons. In 1962 he joined Calcio Foggia, in which he remained for eight more seasons. Calcio Foggia was also the only team Ambrogio has scored any goal for, the number of goals being 7. Valadé played in approximately 224 matches while he was in Foggia. In 1971, he joined S.S. Maceratese 1922 for one season, and proceeded to retire in 1972. His most usual position was left-back defender.

== Personal life ==
Valadé was born on June 28, 1937, in the city of Milan. He died on September 14, 2007, aged 70.
