= Giuseppe Baldi =

Italian footballer

Personal information
- Date of birth: 1905
- Place of birth: Zürich, Switzerland
- Date of death: 29 January 1945 (aged 39–40)
- Place of death: Reggio Emilia, Italy
- Position: Goalkeeper

Senior career*
Years	Team	Apps	(Gls)
1928–1929	Reggiana 1919	16	(0)
1930–1935	Foggia 1920		
- * Club domestic league appearances and goals

Giuseppe Baldi (1905 – 29 January 1945) was an Italian professional footballer who played as a goalkeeper in Serie A for Reggiana 1919. Accused of withholding money from resistance fighters during the Second World War, he was executed by partisans in 1945.
