= Oronzo Pugliese =

Italian football manager

Personal information
- Date of birth: 5 April 1910
- Place of birth: Turi, Italy

Managerial career
- Years: Team
- 1946–1952: Leonzio
- 1952–1955: Messina
- 1955–1959: Reggina
- 1959–1961: Siena
- 1961–1965: Foggia
- 1966–1968: Roma
- 1969: Bologna
- 1969–1970: Bari
- 1971: Fiorentina
- 1973: Bologna
- 1973–1974: Lucchese
- 1974–1975: Avellino

Oronzo Pugliese (5 April 1910 – 11 March 1990) was an Italian football manager from Turi in the Province of Bari.

Over the course of his career, Pugliese managed several notable clubs in Italian football, among them were; Roma, Fiorentina and his home province side Bari.
