= Giuseppe Giustacchini =

Italian footballer

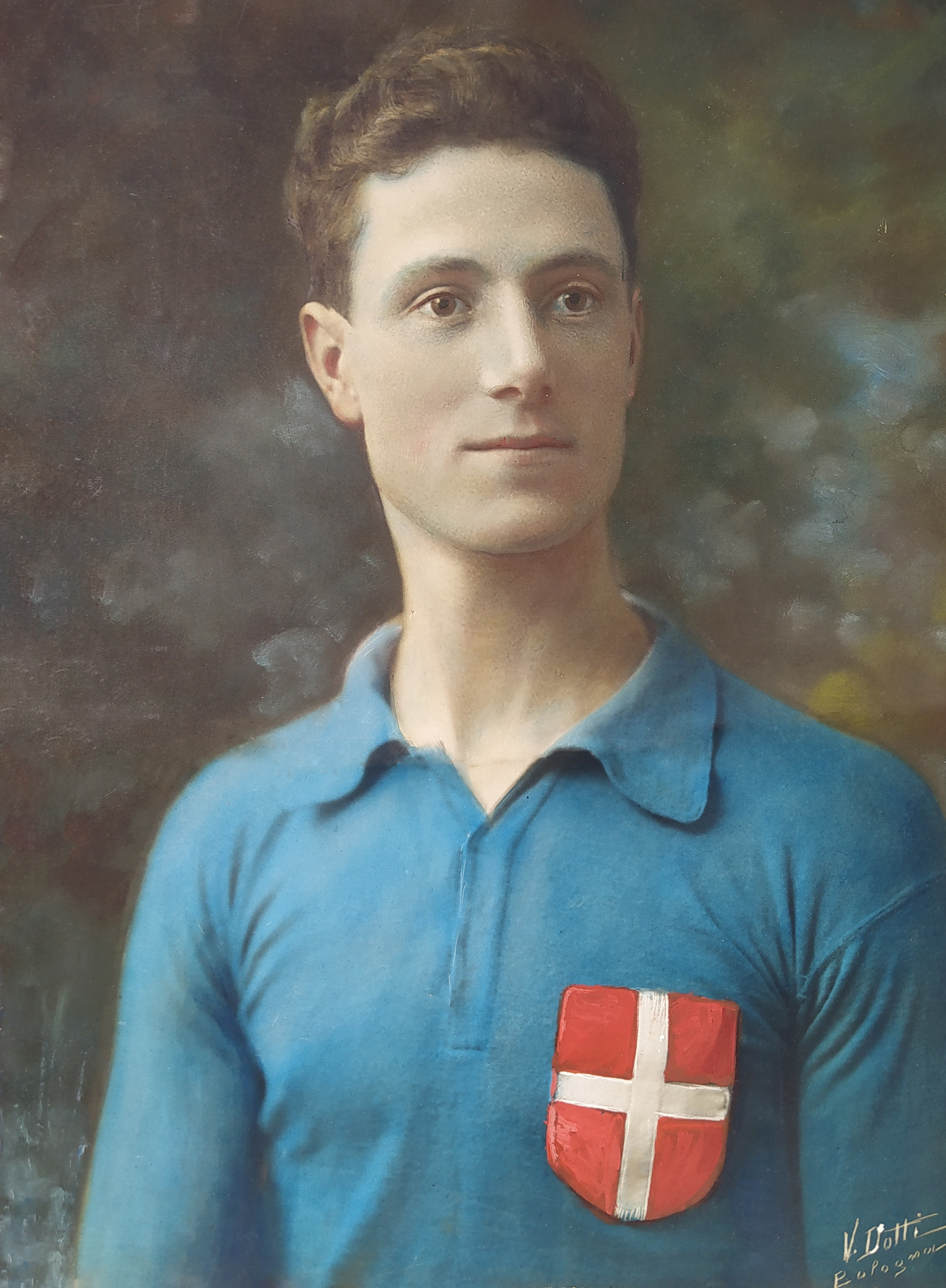

Personal information
- Full name: Giuseppe Giustacchini
- Date of birth: 17 January 1900
- Place of birth: Milan, Italy
- Date of death: 9 December 1974 (aged 74)
- Place of death: Genoa, Italy
- Position: Midfielder

Senior career*
Years	Team	Apps	(Gls)
191?–1919	Stelvio	?	(?)
1919–1923	Virtus Bologna	?	(0)
1923–1928	Internazionale	22	(1)
1928–1930	Foggia	67	(5)
1930–1931	Empoli	?	(?)

International career
1921	Italy	1	(0)
- * Club domestic league appearances and goals

Giuseppe Giustacchini (Italian pronunciation: [dʒuˈzɛppe dʒustakˈkiːni]; 17 January 1900 – 9 December 1974) was an Italian footballer who played as a midfielder. On 6 November 1921, he represented the Italy national football team on the occasion of a friendly match against Switzerland in a 1–1 away draw.
