= Cosimo Nocera =

Italian footballer (1938-2012)

Personal information
- Date of birth: 16 August 1938
- Place of birth: Secondigliano, Italy
- Date of death: 28 November 2012 (aged 74)
- Place of death: Foggia, Italy
- Position: Forward

Senior career*
Years	Team	Apps	(Gls)
1959–1969	Foggia Calcio	257	(101)

International career
1965	Italy	1	(1)
- * Club domestic league appearances and goals

Cosimo Nocera (Italian pronunciation: [ˈkɔːzimo noˈtʃɛːra]; 16 August 1938 – 28 November 2012) was an Italian international footballer who played as a forward.
