= 1950–51 Juventus FC season =

Italian football club season

Juventus Football Club
1950–51 season
- President: Gianni Agnelli
- Manager: Jesse Carver
- Stadium: Stadio Comunale
- Serie A: 3rd (in Copa Rio)
- Copa Rio: Runners-up
- Top goalscorer: League: K. A. Hansen (23); All: Giampiero Boniperti (28)
Home colours	Away colours

During the 1950–51 season Juventus Football Club competed in Serie A and the Rio Cup.

== Summary ==
The team played a season with Hansen and Præst having been joined by another Dane, Karl Aage Hansen. He was captain of the 1948 Olympic team and came from Serie A rivals Atalanta Bergamo. The level of understanding between the three Danes, together with Giampiero Boniperti, delivered a superb campaign that produced a milestone of 103 goals scored.

However, coach Jesse Carver was fired by the club in August 1951 as the 3rd place in the league standings behind Milan and Inter was deemed not good enough.

== Squad ==
Note: Flags indicate national team as defined under FIFA eligibility rules; some limited exceptions apply. Players may hold more than one non-FIFA nationality.

Pos.	Nation	Player
GK	ITA	Filippo Cavalli
GK	ITA	Giovanni Viola
DF	ITA	Alberto Bertuccelli
DF	ITA	Enrico Boniforti
DF	ITA	Sergio Manente
MF	ITA	Romolo Bizzotto
MF	ITA	Giacomo Mari
MF	ITA	Rino Ferrario
MF	DEN	Karl Aage Hansen

Pos.	Nation	Player
MF	ITA	Carlo Parola
MF	ITA	Alberto Piccinini
FW	ITA	Giampiero Boniperti
FW	DEN	John Hansen
FW	ITA	Amos Mariani
FW	ITA	Ermes Muccinelli
FW	DEN	Karl Åge Præst
FW	ITA	Pasquale Vivolo

== Competitions ==
=== Serie A ===
==== League table ====
Pos	Team	Pld	W	D	L	GF	GA	GD	Pts	Qualification or relegation
1	Milan (C)	38	26	8	4	107	39	+68	60	1951 Latin Cup
2	Internazionale	38	27	5	6	107	43	+64	59	
3	Juventus	38	23	8	7	103	44	+59	54	
4	Lazio	38	18	10	10	64	50	+14	46	
5	Fiorentina	38	18	8	12	52	42	+10	44	

Source: Panini
(C) Champions

==== Matches ====
10 September 1950 1	Pro Patria	0–7	Juventus	Busto Arsizio
15:30 CEST		Report	41', 89' (pen.) K.A.Hansen; 47', 74' Præst; 55' Muccinelli; 58' J. Hansen; 75' Boniperti	Stadium: Stadio Comunale; Attendance: 4,627; Referee: Orlandini

17 September 1950 2	Juventus	2–2	Triestina	Turin
15:30 CEST	Præst 59'; J.Hansen 62'	Report	14' Boscolo; 50' Bertuccelli	Stadium: Stadio Comunale; Attendance: 27,994; Referee: Bernardi

24 September 1950 3	Lucchese	0–1	Juventus	Lucca
15:30 CEST		Report	74' Bizzotto	Stadium: Stadio Porta Elisa; Attendance: 7,400; Referee: Galeati

1 October 1950 4	Sampdoria	1–1	Juventus	Genoa
15:00 CEST	Parola 65'	Report	67' Boniperti	Stadium: Stadio Luigi Ferraris; Attendance: 36,703; Referee: Bruno Tassini

8 October 1950 5	Juventus	7–2	Roma	Turin
15:00 CEST	Boniperti 38'; K.A. Hansen 43', 46' (pen.) 72'; Præst 48', 77'; J. Hansen 88'	Report	12' Sundqvist; 17' Bacci	Stadium: Stadio Comunale; Attendance: 27,994; Referee: Giuseppe Carpani

15 October 1950 6	Fiorentina	1–2	Juventus	Florence
20:45 CEST	Galassi 34'	Report	25', 58' J. Hansen	Stadium: Stadio Comunale; Attendance: 46,389; Referee: Riccardo Pieri

22 October 1950 7	Juventus	1–1	Milan	Turin
15:00 CEST	K.A. Hansen 77' (pen.)	Report	47' Liedholm	Stadium: Stadio Comunale; Attendance: 27,994; Referee: Bellè

29 October 1950 8	Bologna	0–5	Juventus	Bologna
15:00 CEST		Report	14' Manente; 19', 69' Præst; 74' K.A. Hansen; 82' J. Hansen	Stadium: Stadio Comunale; Attendance: 38,279; Referee: Orlandini

5 November 1950 9	Juventus	3–2	Napoli	Turin
14:30 CET	J. Hansen 34'; Boniperti 51', 57'	Report	80' Astorri; 88' Formentin	Stadium: Stadio Comunale; Attendance: 27,994; Referee: Rigato

12 November 1950 10	Torino	1–4	Juventus	Turin
14:30 CET	Carapellese 89'	Report	8' Boniperti; 72', 87' J. Hansen; 82' Boniforti	Stadium: Stadio Filadelfia; Attendance: 20,000; Referee: Pieri

19 November 1950 11	Como	1–0	Juventus	Como
14:30 CET	Boniforti 82'	Report		Stadium: Stadio Giuseppe Sinigaglia; Attendance: 13,602; Referee: Dattilo

26 November 1950 12	Juventus	4–1	Palermo	Turin
14:30 CET	Muccinelli 1', 80'; Boniperti 19'; K.A. Hansen 69'	Report	76' (pen.) Gülesin	Stadium: Stadio Comunale; Attendance: 27,994; Referee: Giorgio Bernardi

3 December 1950 13	Inter	3–0	Juventus	Milan
14:30 CET	Nyers 31', 62'; Wilkes 42'	Report		Stadium: Stadio San Siro; Attendance: 80,018; Referee: Ferruccio Bellè

10 December 1950 14	Juventus	4–0	Novara	Turin
14:30 CET	Muccinelli 1', 8'; Boniperti 70'; J. Hansen 88'	Report		Stadium: Stadio Comunale; Attendance: 27,994; Referee: Vincenzo Orlandini

17 December 1950 15	Udinese	0–3	Juventus	Udine
14:30 CET		Report	1' K.A. Hansen; 8' Boniperti; 19' J. Hansen	Stadium: Stadio Moretti; Attendance: 25,000; Referee: Generoso Dattilo

24 December 1950 16	Genoa	0–3	Juventus	Genoa
14:30 CET		Report	10', 67' J. Hansen; 69' K.A. Hansen	Stadium: Stadio Luigi Ferraris; Attendance: 36,703; Referee: Giovanni Galeati

31 December 1950 17	Juventus	1–1	Lazio	Turin
14:30 CET	Muccinelli 50'	Report	9' Cecconi	Stadium: Stadio Comunale; Attendance: 27,994; Referee: Ferruccio Bellè

7 January 1951 18	Juventus	5–1	Padova	Turin
14:30 CET	Boniperti 26', 77'; Præst 51'; J. Hansen 67'; K.A. Hansen 69'	Report	73' Martegani	Stadium: Stadio Comunale; Attendance: 27,994; Referee: Florindo Longagnani

14 January 1951 19	Atalanta	1–5	Juventus	Bergamo
15:00 CET	J. Sørensen 45'	Report	20', 29', 79' Boniperti; 30' Præst; 56' (pen.) K.A. Hansen	Stadium: Stadio Comunale; Attendance: 22,335; Referee: Vittorio Pera

21 January 1951 20	Juventus	2–1	Pro Patria	Turin
14:30 CET	Boniperti 75'; Muccinelli 86'	Report	5' La Rosa	Stadium: Stadio Comunale; Attendance: 27,994; Referee: Bruno Tassini

28 January 1950 21	Triestina	2–2	Juventus	Trieste
14:30 CET	Boscolo 27'; Petrozzi 90'	Report	12' K.A. Hansen; 52' Præst	Stadium: Stadio Comunale; Attendance: 6,226; Referee: Generoso Dattilo

4 February 1951 22	Juventus	1–0	Lucchese	Turin
15:00 CET	Mazza 50'	Report		Stadium: Stadio Comunale; Attendance: 27,994; Referee: Guido Agnolin

11 February 1951 23	Juventus	7–2	Sampdoria	Turin
15:00 CET	J. Hansen 7', 61'; K.A. Hansen 25', 31', 71'; Muccinelli 69'; Præst 85'	Report	15' Coscia; 35' Sabbatella	Stadium: Stadio Comunale; Attendance: 27,994; Referee: Tommaso Corallo

18 February 1951 24	Roma	3–0	Juventus	Rome
15:00 CET	Andersson 41'; Merlin 60'; Bacci 80'	Report		Stadium: Stadio Nazionale; Attendance: 47,300; Referee: Giovanni Galeati

25 February 1951 25	Juventus	5–0	Fiorentina	Turin
15:00 CET	Præst 17', 81'; K.A. Hansen 25', 59'; Vivolo 79'	Report		Stadium: Stadio Comunale; Attendance: 27,994; Referee: Vincenzo Orlandini

4 March 1951 26	Milan	2–0	Juventus	Milan
15:00 CET	Nordahl 56'; Liedholm 61'	Report		Stadium: Stadio San Siro; Attendance: 80,018; Referee: Generoso Dattilo

11 March 1951 27	Juventus	1–1	Bologna	Turin
15:00 CET	J. Hansen 72'	Report	34' Cervellati	Stadium: Stadio Comunale; Attendance: 27,994; Referee: Guido Agnolin

18 March 1951 28	Napoli	1–1	Juventus	Naples
15:00 CET	Formentin 88'	Report	78' Boniperti	Stadium: Stadio Arturo Collana; Attendance: 12,000; Referee: Riccardo Pieri

25 March 1951 29	Juventus	5–1	Torino	Turin
15:30 CET	J. Hansen 6'; Boniperti 27', 83'; Bertuccelli 85'; K.A. Hansen 89' (pen.)	Report	64' Santos	Stadium: Stadio Comunale; Attendance: 27,994; Referee: Giorgio Bernardi

1 April 1951 30	Juventus	0–3	Como	Turin
15:30 CEST		Report	56' Manente; 86', 89' Ghiandi	Stadium: Stadio Comunale; Attendance: 27,994; Referee: Aldo Cartei

15 April 1951 31	Palermo	1–5	Juventus	Palermo
15:30 CEST	Giaroli 70' (pen.)	Report	29' Boniperti; 33' Muccinelli; 37' Præst; 50' Vivolo; 67' K.A. Hansen	Stadium: Stadio La Favorita; Attendance: 36,349; Referee: Tommaso Corallo

22 April 1951 32	Juventus	0–2	Inter	Turin
15:30 CEST		Report	67', 82' (pen.) Nyers	Stadium: Stadio Comunale; Attendance: 27,994; Referee: Generoso Dattilo

29 April 1951 33	Novara	3–1	Juventus	Novara
15:30 CEST	Aranđelović 42'; Piola 72'; Pesaola 74'	Report	21' Mari	Stadium: Stadio Comunale; Attendance: 17,875; Referee: Riccardo Pieri

13 May 1951 34	Juventus	1–1	Udinese	Turin
16:00 CEST	J. Hansen 19'	Report	73' E. Sørensen	Stadium: Stadio Comunale; Attendance: 27,994; Referee: Guglielmo Matucci

20 May 1951 35	Juventus	4–1	Genoa	Turin
16:00 CEST	Præst 9'; K.A. Hansen 67' (pen.); Boniperti 83'; J. Hansen 89'	Report	21' Dante	Stadium: Stadio Comunale; Attendance: 27,994; Referee: Riccardo Pieri

27 May 1951 36	Lazio	0–3	Juventus	Rome
16:00 CEST		Report	56', 81' K.A. Hansen; 75' Boniperti	Stadium: Stadio Comunale; Attendance: 47,300; Referee: Giorgio Bernardi

10 June 1951 37	Padova	0–1	Juventus	Padua
16:00 CEST		Report	84' Præst	Stadium: Stadio Silvio Appiani; Attendance: 24,000; Referee: Luigi Valsecchi

17 June 1951 38	Juventus	6–2	Atalanta	Turin
16:00 CEST	Muccinelli 11'; Mari 13'; Boniperti 50'; Bizzotto 55'; Bertuccelli 56'; Parola 72'	Report	58' Mariani; 80' Rota	Stadium: Stadio Comunale; Attendance: 27,994; Referee: Mario Maurelli

=== Copa Rio ===
==== Group São Paulo ====
1 July 1951	Juventus	3–2	(Socialist Federal Republic of Yugoslavia) Crvena Zvezda	São Paulo
	Boniperti 26', 42'; K. A. Hansen 84' (pen.)	Report	18' Tomašević; 59' Ognjanov	Stadium: Pacaembu; Referee: (Brazil) Alberto da Gama Malcher

3 July 1951	(France) Nice	2–3	Juventus	São Paulo
	Courteaux 20', 60'	Report	11' Vivolo; 35' Præst; 77' Muccinelli	Stadium: Pacaembu; Referee: (Austria) Franz Grill

8 July 1951	(Brazil) Palmeiras	0–4	Juventus	São Paulo
		Report	10', 18' Boniperti; 48' (pen.) K. A. Hansen; 80' Præst	Stadium: Pacaembu; Attendance: 37.639; Referee: (England) Edward Graigh

==== Semifinals ====
12 July 1951	Austria Wien	3–3	Juventus	São Paulo
	Koller 29'; Stojaspal 39', 85' (pen.)	Report	32' Muccinelli; 49', 72' Præst	Stadium: Pacaembu; Referee: (Brazil) Alberto da Gama Malcher

14 July 1951	Juventus	3–1	Austria Wien	São Paulo
	Muccinelli 53', 55'; Boniperti 59'	Report	Stojaspal 44'	Stadium: Pacaembu; Attendance: (England) Edward Graigh

==== Final ====
18 July 1951	(Brazil) Palmeiras	1–0	Juventus	São Paulo
	Rodrigues 20'	Report		Stadium: Pacaembu; Attendance: 56.961; Referee: (Austria) Franz Grill

22 July 1951	Juventus	2–2	(Brazil) Palmeiras	Rio de Janeiro
	Præst 17'; Boniperti 77'	Report	48' Rodrigues; 53' Liminha	Stadium: Maracanã; Attendance: 100.933; Referee: (France) Gaby Tordjan

== Statistics ==
=== Player statistics ===
No.	Pos	Nat	Player	Total		1950-51 Serie A	
No.	Pos	Nat	Player	Apps	Goals	Apps	Goals
	GK	(Italy) ITA	Giovanni Viola	32	-33	32	-33
	DF	(Italy) ITA	Alberto Bertuccelli	29	2	29	2
	DF	(Italy) ITA	Sergio Manente	38	1	38	1
	MF	(Italy) ITA	Romolo Bizzotto	28	2	28	2
	MF	(Italy) ITA	Giacomo Mari	34	2	34	2
	MF	(Denmark) DEN	Karl Aage Hansen	35	23	35	23
	MF	(Italy) ITA	Carlo Parola	35	1	35	1
	FW	(Italy) ITA	Giampiero Boniperti	37	22	37	22
	FW	(Denmark) DEN	John Hansen	33	20	33	20
	FW	(Italy) ITA	Ermes Muccinelli	33	10	33	10
	FW	(Denmark) DEN	Karl Åge Præst	37	16	37	16
	GK	(Italy) ITA	Filippo Cavalli	6	-11	6	-11
	FW	(Italy) ITA	Pasquale Vivolo	16	2	16	2
	MF	(Italy) ITA	Alberto Piccinini	12	0	12	0
	DF	(Italy) ITA	Enrico Boniforti	10	1	10	1
	MF	(Italy) ITA	Rino Ferrario	3	0	3	0
	FW	(Italy) ITA	Amos Mariani	0	0	0	0
