= 1951–52 Juventus FC season =

Italian football club season

Juventus Football Club
1951–52 season
- Chairman: Gianni Agnelli
- Manager: Jesse Carver then Combi-Bertolini (interim), then György Sárosi
- Stadium: Stadio Comunale
- Serie A: 1st (in Latin Cup)
- Latin Cup: 3rd
- Top goalscorer: League: John Hansen (30); All: John Hansen (30)
Home colours	Away colours

During the 1951–52 season Juventus Football Club competed in Serie A and the Latin Cup.

== Summary ==
The bianconero club saw a moving summer due to disagreements between Juventus chairman and manager Carver, who exploded in an interview with Gazzetta dello Sport just before the preseason in August, demanding the selling of the Hansen brothers, John and Præst, and buying Benito Lorenzi from Inter. The response of chairman Gianni Agnelli was the dismissal of the English manager. The team new replacement was Hungarian György Sárosi, with contract in the United States until December; meanwhile, Gianpiero Combi and Luigi Bertolini were interim managers.

During the Serie A season, Hansen scored 30 goals, earning him the "Capocannoniere" Italian top goal-scorer title, along with the squad reaching a massive total of 98 goals scored and helping Juventus to win its 9th domestic title.

== Squad ==
Note: Flags indicate national team as defined under FIFA eligibility rules; some limited exceptions apply. Players may hold more than one non-FIFA nationality.

Pos.	Nation	Player
GK	ITA	Filippo Cavalli
GK	ITA	Giovanni Viola
DF	ITA	Alberto Bertuccelli
DF	ITA	Enrico Boniforti
DF	ITA	Giuseppe Corradi
DF	ITA	Sergio Manente
MF	ITA	Romolo Bizzotto
MF	ITA	Rino Ferrario
MF	ITA	Giacomo Mari
MF	ITA	Carlo Parola

Pos.	Nation	Player
MF	ITA	Alberto Piccinini
FW	ITA	Giampiero Boniperti
FW	ITA	Emilio Caprile
FW	DEN	John Hansen
FW	DEN	Karl Aage Hansen
FW	ITA	Ermes Muccinelli
FW	DEN	Karl Åge Præst
FW	ITA	Ermanno Scaramuzzi
FW	ITA	Pasquale Vivolo

== Competitions ==
=== Serie A ===
==== League table ====
Pos	Team	Pld	W	D	L	GF	GA	GD	Pts	Qualification or relegation
1	Juventus (C)	38	26	8	4	98	34	+64	60	1952 Latin Cup
2	Milan	38	20	13	5	87	41	+46	53	
3	Internazionale	38	21	7	10	86	49	+37	49	
4	Fiorentina	38	17	9	12	52	38	+14	43	
4	Lazio	38	15	13	10	60	49	+11	43	

Source: Panini
(C) Champions

==== Matches ====
9 September 1951 1	Juventus	1–1	SPAL	Turin
15:30 CEST	Muccinelli 20'	Report	70' (pen.) Bennike	Stadium: Comunale; Attendance: 27 994; Referee: Armando Marchetti

16 September 1951 2	Legnano	0–3	Juventus	Legnano
15:30 CEST		Report	17' J. Hansen; 84' K. A. Hansen; 87' Boniperti	Stadium: Stadio di via Carlo Pisacane; Attendance: 5 000; Referee: Riccardo Pieri

23 September 1951 3	Juventus	5–3	Lazio	Turin
15:30 CEST	Muccinelli 5', 68'; Præst 12'; K. A. Hansen 28' (pen.); J. Hansen 31'	Report	8' (pen.) Sükrü; 65' Antoniotti; 89' Flamini	Stadium: Comunale; Attendance: 27 994; Referee: Tassini

30 September 1951 4	Fiorentina	0–2	Juventus	Florence
15:30 CEST		Report	72' Muccinelli; 80' Boniperti	Stadium: Stadio Comunale; Attendance: 46 389; Referee: Vincenzo Orlandini

7 October 1951 5	Juventus	7–1	Atalanta	Turin
15:00 CEST	Muccinelli 2', 5'; Boniperti 21', 81'; J. Hansen 47', 57' (pen.); K. A. Hansen 88'	Report	6' Santagostino	Stadium: Comunale; Attendance: 27 994; Referee: Renzo Massai

14 October 1951 6	Triestina	0–3	Juventus	Trieste
15:00 CEST		Report	46', 90' Boniperti; 75' Muccinelli	Stadium: Stadio Comunale; Attendance: 6 226; Referee: Ferruccio Bellè

21 October 1951 7	Pro Patria	1–3	Juventus	Busto Arsizio
15:00 CEST	Toros 88'	Report	2' (pen.) J. Hansen; 9' Boniperti; 20' Muccinelli	Stadium: Stadio Comunale; Attendance: 4 627; Referee: Vincenzo Orlandini

28 October 1951 8	Juventus	5–1	Udinese	Turin
15:00 CEST	J. Hansen 52', 60', 64'; Boniperti 56'; K. A. Hansen 70'	Report	89' Castaldo	Stadium: Comunale; Attendance: 27 994; Referee: Giovanni Occhinegro

4 November 1951 9	Sampdoria	2–1	Juventus	Genoa
14:30 CET	Bergamo 40'; Lucentini 48'	Report	16' Muccinelli	Stadium: Stadio Luigi Ferraris; Attendance: 36 703; Referee: Bruno Tassini

18 November 1951 10	Juventus	2–0	Lucchese	Turin
14:30 CET	J. Hansen 41'; K. A. Hansen 80'	Report		Stadium: Comunale; Attendance: 27 994; Referee: Erminio Piemonte

2 December 1951 11	Torino	0–0	Juventus	Turin
14:30 CET		Report		Stadium: Stadio Filadelfia; Attendance: 30 000; Referee: Bellè

9 December 1951 12	Juventus	1–1	Bologna	Turin
14:30 CET	Boniperti 80'	Report	33' Cervellati	Stadium: Comunale; Attendance: 27 994; Referee: Vincenzo Orlandini

16 December 1951 13	Milan	1–1	Juventus	Milan
14:30 CET	Nordahl 58'	Report	54' J. Hansen	Stadium: Stadio San Siro; Attendance: 80 018; Referee: Bruno Tassini

23 December 1951 14	Juventus	4–0	Palermo	Turin
14:30 CET	Vivolo 8', 32'; J. Hansen 16'; Muccinelli 65'	Report		Stadium: Comunale; Attendance: 27 994; Referee: Renzo Massai

30 December 1951 15	Napoli	1–2	Juventus	Naples
14:30 CET	Astorri 30'	Report	12' (pen.) Mari; 69' J. Hansen	Stadium: Stadio del Vomero; Attendance: 12 000; Referee: Giorgio Bernardi

6 January 1952 16	Juventus	3–2	Inter	Turin
14:30 CET	Præst 24'; Muccinelli 61'; Mari 71' (pen.)	Report	25' Nyers; 38' Lorenzi	Stadium: Comunale; Attendance: 27 994; Referee: Bruno Tassini

13 January 1952 17	Novara	1–4	Juventus	Novara
14:30 CET	Baira 79'	Report	46', 85' J. Hansen; 47' Vivolo; 68' Boniperti	Stadium: Comunale; Referee: Vincenzo Orlandini

20 January 1952 18	Como	2–0	Juventus	Como
14:30 CET	Giovetti 26'; Baldini 49'	Report		Stadium: Stadio Giuseppe Sinigaglia; Attendance: 13 602; Referee: Renzo Massai

27 January 1952 19	Juventus	3–0	Padova	Turin
14:30 CET	Caprile 20'; J. Hansen 79'; Vivolo 81' (pen.)	Report		Stadium: Comunale; Attendance: 27 994; Referee: Aldo Cartei

3 February 1952 20	SPAL	0–1	Juventus	Ferrara
15:00 CET		Report	1' K. A. Hansen	Stadium: Stadio Comunale; Referee: Luigi Gemini

10 February 1952 21	Juventus	6–1	Legnano	Turin
15:00 CET	Boniperti 1', 18', 30'; J. Hansen 29', 65', 68'	Report	78' Eidefjäll	Stadium: Comunale; Attendance: 27 994; Referee: Giovanni Occhinegro

17 February 1952 22	Lazio	2–0	Juventus	Rome
15:00 CET	Antoniotti 24'; Puccinelli 86'	Report		Stadium: Stadio Nazionale; Attendance: 47 300; Referee: Giorgio Bernardi

2 March 1952 23	Juventus	4–0	Fiorentina	Turin
15:00 CET	Boniperti 23'; J. Hansen 44', 88'; Muccinelli 46'	Report		Stadium: Comunale; Attendance: 27 994; Referee: Riccardo Pieri

9 March 1952 24	Atalanta	0–1	Juventus	Bergamo
15:00 CET		Report	56' J. Hansen	Stadium: Stadio Comunale; Attendance: 26 542; Referee: Guido Agnolin

16 March 1952 25	Juventus	2–1	Triestina	Turin
15:00 CET	J. Hansen 20'; Muccinelli 40'	Report	55' Boscolo	Stadium: Comunale; Attendance: 27 994; Referee: Giorgio Bernardi

23 March 1952 26	Juventus	5–1	Pro Patria	Turin
15:30 CET	J. Hansen 3' (pen.), 22'; Muccinelli 26', 58'; Boniperti 75'	Report	27' Santos	Stadium: Comunale; Attendance: 27 994; Referee: Florindo Longagnani

30 March 1952 27	Udinese	2–7	Juventus	Udine
15:30 CET	Sørensen 73'; Darin 82'	Report	5', 39', 47' Vivolo; 30', 50' J. Hansen; 65', 83' K. A. Hansen	Stadium: Stadio Moretti; Attendance: 25 000; Referee: Vincenzo Orlandini

5 April 1952 28	Juventus	2–1	Sampdoria	Turin
15:30 CEST	K. A. Hansen 21'; Vivolo 44'	Report	41' (o.g.) Manente	Stadium: Comunale; Attendance: 27 994; Referee: Riccardo Pieri

13 April 1952 29	Lucchese	0–0	Juventus	Lucca
16:00 CEST		Report		Stadium: Stadio Porta Elisa; Attendance: 7 400; Referee: Guido Agnolin

20 April 1952 30	Juventus	6–0	Torino	Turin
16:00 CEST	J. Hansen 10', 82'; K. A. Hansen 17'; Vivolo 40'; Boniperti 64', 89'	Report		Stadium: Comunale; Attendance: 27 994; Referee: Vincenzo Orlandini

27 April 1952 31	Bologna	2–3	Juventus	Bologna
16:00 CEST	Gritti 13', 85'	Report	8' J. Hansen; 10' K. A. Hansen; 18' Vivolo	Stadium: Comunale; Attendance: 38 279; Referee: Diego De Leo

4 May 1952 32	Juventus	3–1	Milan	Turin
16:00 CEST	Vivolo 4'; Boniperti 18'; Præst 65'	Report	89' Gren	Stadium: Comunale; Attendance: 27 994; Referee: Luigi Gemini

11 May 1952 33	Palermo	0–0	Juventus	Palermo
16:00 CEST		Report		Stadium: Stadio La Favorita; Attendance: 36 349; Referee: Guido Agnolin

25 May 1952 34	Juventus	1–1	Napoli	Turin
16:00 CEST	K. A. Hansen 76'	Report	75' Mayer	Stadium: Comunale; Attendance: 27 994; Referee: Iginio Rigato

1 June 1952 35	Inter	3–2	Juventus	Milan
16:00 CEST	Broccini 13'; Armano 33'; Lorenzi 64'	Report	69' Boniperti; 75' J. Hansen	Stadium: Stadio San Siro; Attendance: 80 018; Referee: Guido Agnolin

8 June 1952 36	Juventus	3–1	Novara	Turin
16:30 CEST	Vivolo 19'; Muccinelli 82'; Parola 88'	Report	87' Feccia	Stadium: Comunale; Attendance: 27 994; Referee: Gennaro Marchese

15 June 1952 37	Juventus	0–0	Como	Turin
16:30 CEST		Report		Stadium: Comunale; Attendance: 27 994; Referee: Guido Agnolin

22 June 1952 38	Padova	1–2	Juventus	Padua
16:30 CEST	Prunecchi 39'	Report	41' Caprile; 53' Muccinelli	Stadium: Stadio Silvio Appiani; Attendance: 10 000; Referee: Giovanni Occhinegro

=== Latin Cup ===
==== Semifinals ====
26 June 1952	Juventus	2–4	(Spain) FC Barcelona	Paris
21:30 CEST	Boniperti 41', 80'	Report	3' Manchón; 20', 54' Basora; 50' Kubala	Stadium: Parc des Princes; Attendance: 48 527; Referee: (France) Vincenti

==== 3rd place ====
28 June 1952	Juventus	3–2	(Portugal) Sporting Lisboa	Paris
	Boniperti 5'; K. A. Hansen 7'; Vivolo 15'	Report	30', 78' Martins	Stadium: Parc des Princes; Attendance: 48 527; Referee: (Spain) Asensi

== Statistics ==
=== Squad statistics ===
Competition	Points	Home						Away						Total						GD
Competition	Points	G	W	D	L	Gs	Ga	G	W	D	L	Gs	Ga	G	W	D	L	Gs	Ga	GD
Serie A	60	19	15	4	0	63	16	19	11	4	4	35	18	38	26	8	4	98	34	+64
Latin Cup	-	-	-	-	-	-	-	-	-	-	-	-	-	2	1	0	1	5	6	-1
Total	60	19	15	4	0	63	16	19	11	4	4	35	18	40	27	8	5	103	40	+63

=== Players statistics ===
No.	Pos	Nat	Player	Total		1951–52 Serie A	
No.	Pos	Nat	Player	Apps	Goals	Apps	Goals
	GK	(Italy) ITA	Giovanni Viola	34	0	34	0
	DF	(Italy) ITA	Alberto Bertuccelli	24	0	24	0
	DF	(Italy) ITA	Sergio Manente	33	0	33	0
	MF	(Italy) ITA	Rino Ferrario	24	0	24	0
	MF	(Italy) ITA	Giacomo Mari	31	2	31	2
	MF	(Italy) ITA	Alberto Piccinini	34	0	34	0
	FW	(Italy) ITA	Giampiero Boniperti	33	19	33	19
	FW	(Denmark) DEN	John Hansen	36	30	36	30
	FW	(Denmark) DEN	Karl Aage Hansen	31	12	31	12
	FW	(Italy) ITA	Ermes Muccinelli	30	17	30	17
	FW	(Denmark) DEN	Karl Åge Præst	35	3	35	3
	GK	(Italy) ITA	Filippo Cavalli	4	0	4	0
	FW	(Italy) ITA	Pasquale Vivolo	19	12	19	12
	DF	(Italy) ITA	Giuseppe Corradi	17	0	17	0
	MF	(Italy) ITA	Carlo Parola	15	1	15	1
	MF	(Italy) ITA	Romolo Bizzotto	10	0	10	0
	FW	(Italy) ITA	Emilio Caprile	5	2	5	2
	DF	(Italy) ITA	Enrico Boniforti	2	0	2	0
	FW	(Italy) ITA	Ermanno Scaramuzzi	1	0	1	0
