= Martegani =

Martegani is an Italian surname. Notable people with the surname include:

- Agustín Martegani (born 2000), Argentine footballer
- Enrique Martegani (1925–2006), Argentine footballer
