= Giampiero Boniperti =

Italian footballer (1928–2021)

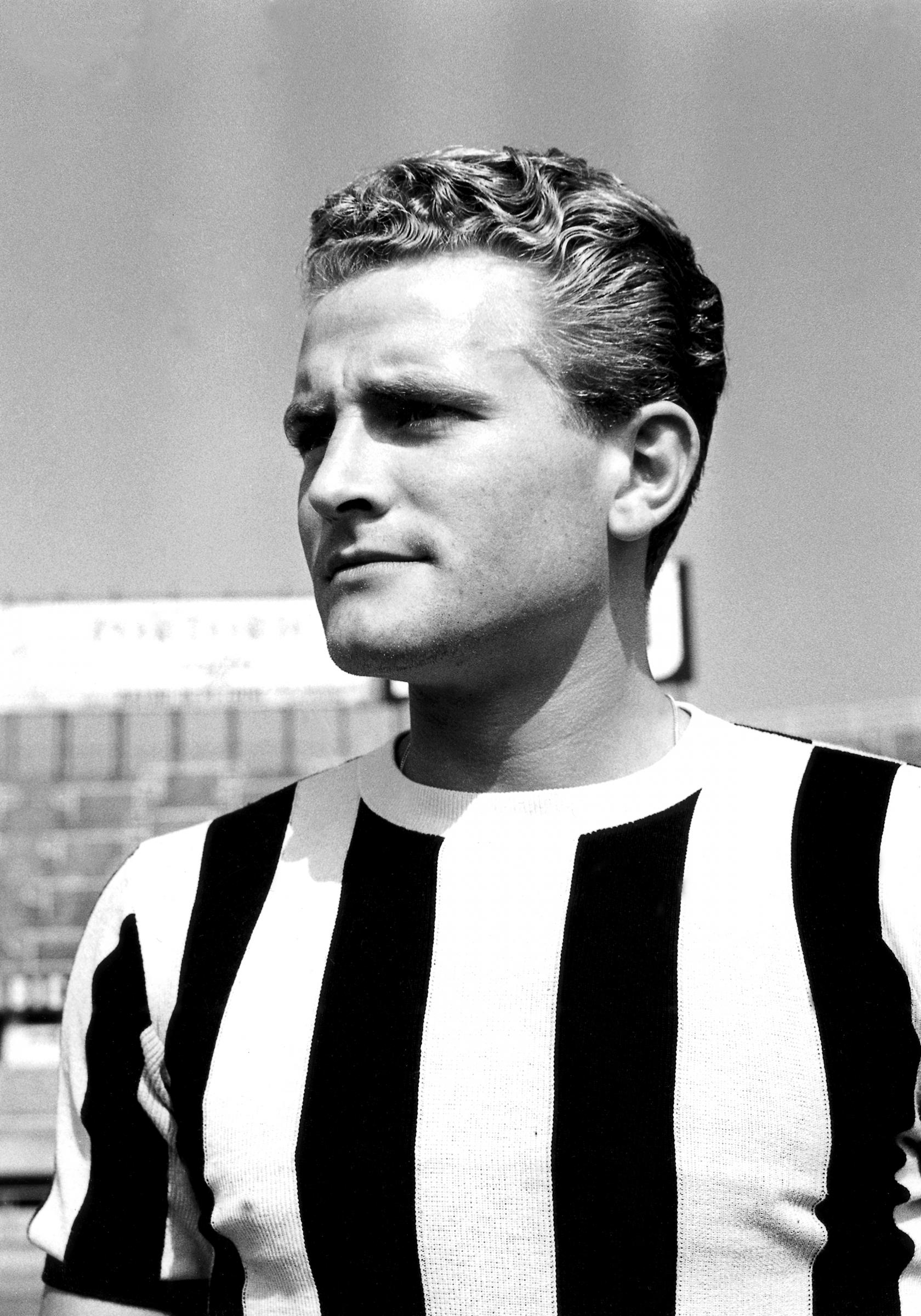
- Boniperti with Juventus between 1940s and 1950s
- Born: 4 July 1928; Barengo, Piedmont, Kingdom of Italy
- Died: 17 June 2021 (aged 92); Turin, Piedmont, Italy
- Occupations: Footballer; Company director; Politician
Years active
1946–1961	(as footballer)
1961–1990	(as company director)
1994–1999	(politician)
- Employer: Juventus
- Known for: FIFA 100; second highest goalscorer of Juventus; see content for full awards and recognition
- Height: 1.75 m (5 ft 9 in)
- Title: Juventus chairman
- Term: 1971–1990
- Predecessor: Vittore Catella
- Successor: Vittorio Caissotti di Chiusano
- Relatives: Filippo Boniperti (grandson)

Member of the European Parliament
- In office 1994–1999

Personal details
- Party: Forza Italia
Other political
affiliations
Forza Europa	(1994–1995)
Union for Europe	(1995–1998)
European People's Party	(1998–1999)
Association football career
- Position: Striker
Youth career
- 1944–1946: Juventus
Senior career*
Years	Team	Apps	(Gls)
1946–1961	Juventus	443	(179)
International career
1947–1960	Italy	38	(8)
1950	Italy B	1	(2)
- * Club domestic league appearances and goals

Giampiero Boniperti (Italian pronunciation: [dʒamˈpjɛːro boniˈpɛrti]; 4 July 1928 – 17 June 2021) was an Italian footballer who played his entire 15-season career at Juventus between 1946 and 1961, winning five Serie A titles and two Coppa Italia titles. He also played for the Italy national team at international level and took part in the 1950 and 1954 FIFA World Cup finals, as well as the 1952 Summer Olympics with Italy. After retirement from professional football, Boniperti was the CEO and chairman of Juventus and, later, a deputy to the European Parliament.

A forward, Boniperti is regarded by several pundits, including Mario Sconcerti, as one of Italy's and Juventus's greatest ever players, and is considered by some in the sport, such as Bruno Nicolè, to be Italy's greatest player of all time; with 182 goals in all competitions, Boniperti was the highest goalscorer in Juventus history for more than 40 years, until his record was bested by Alessandro Del Piero on 10 January 2006. Del Piero also broke his club record of 443 Serie A appearances on 14 February 2010, when he played his 444th Serie A game in a 3–2 win against Genoa; with 443 Serie A appearances for Juventus, Boniperti is currently third in the club's rankings, behind only Del Piero and Gianluigi Buffon. Boniperti also held the record for most minutes played in Serie A by a Juventus player (39,680), until his record was surpassed by Buffon on 19 March 2017, in the 66th minute of a 1–0 away win over Sampdoria. Boniperti is the eleventh-highest goalscorer of all-time in Serie A. In March 2004, he was named by Pelé as one of the world's top 125 greatest living footballers.

== Club career ==
Born in Barengo, Piedmont, Boniperti signed for Juventus at age 16; he had already built himself a reputation prior to this at youth level, as he scored 11 goals in one match. He could score successfully with both feet and was known for his power and tactical awareness. He played his first match for the Old Lady in Serie A on 2 March 1947 against A.C. Milan, which ended in a 2–1 defeat. His first goal for them in the league was three months later, against Sampdoria. Juventus ended the 1946–47 Serie A season as runners-up to local rivals Torino. Giampiero ended the season with five goals in six games to his name.

Although he began as a centre forward, he could also play as an inside forward or on the right wing. In his second season with Juventus, he was 20 years old and scored 27 goals during that season, finishing above Valentino Mazzola as the league's top scorer. Boniperti's first league championship with Juventus was during the 1949–50 season. By his 24th birthday, he had scored 100 goals for the club, adding a second scudetto title to his name in 1951–52. Although he was named the club's captain in 1954, for much of the 1950s, Juve and Boniperti struggled to put the club back to the top of the Italian championship.

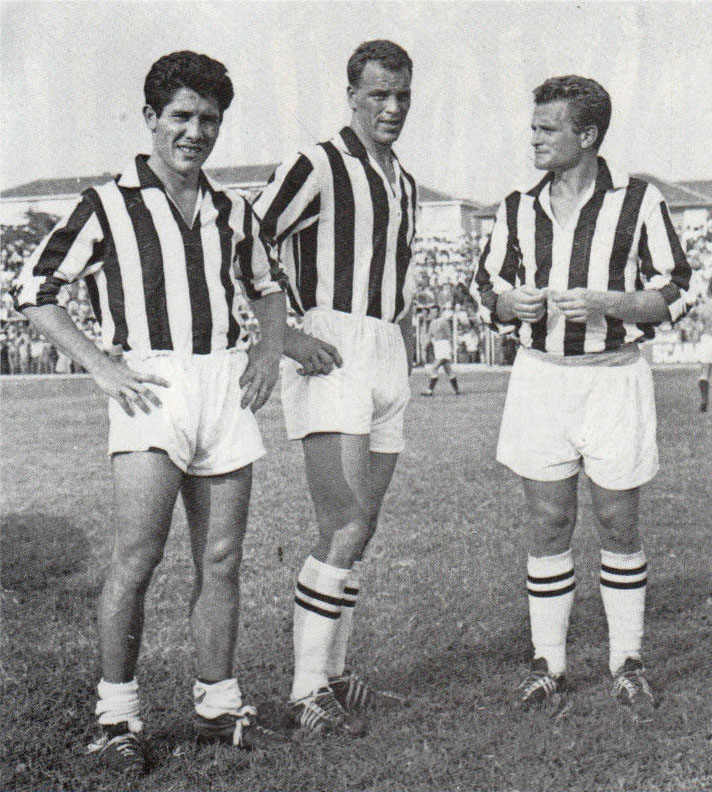
From left to right: Omar Sívori, John Charles and Boniperti, the attacking Magical Trio of Juventus at the turn of the 1950s and 1960s.

In 1957, Juventus signed two forwards: John Charles and Omar Sívori. With them, Boniperti would be a part of what was referred to as the Magical Trio. During Boniperti's last four seasons at the club before his retirement, Juventus was successful in the Italian league, winning the Serie A three times (1957–58, 1959–60 and 1960–61), and the Coppa Italia twice (1958–59 and 1959–60). At the time of his retirement, Boniperti was Juventus' all-time top goalscorer with 182 in all competitions. This record stood for over 40 years before Alessandro Del Piero beat it on 10 January 2006. As of 2010, Boniperti was the second top goalscorer of all-time at Juventus and was seventh on the list of all-time top appearances for the club. With 443 appearances in Serie A for Juventus, he held the club record for most appearances in the competition until long-serving player and former Juventus captain Alessandro Del Piero beat it on 14 February 2010.

== International career ==
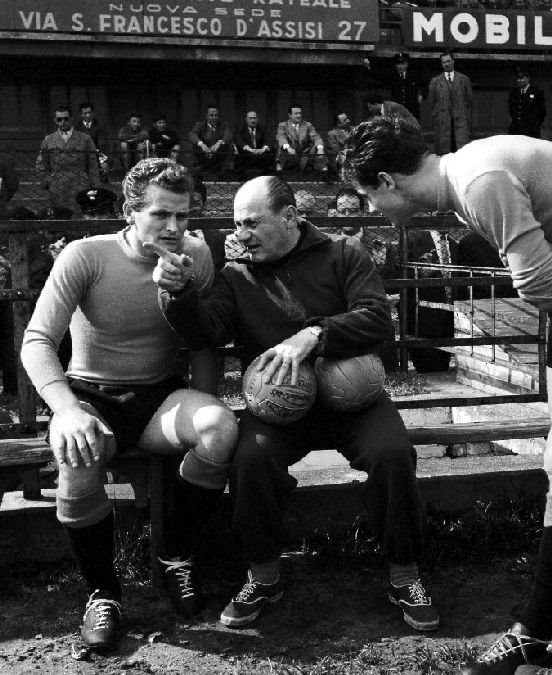
Boniperti (left) as Italy captain, in private with the Azzurri coach Lajos Czeizler in 1954.

After playing 14 games in the Serie A league, Boniperti was called up to play for the Italy national football team, making his international debut on 9 November 1947, in a game against Austria; the match ended in a 5–1 loss to the Austrian side. He got even with Austria a couple of years later, when in May 1949 he scored his first international goal for Italy, with a 3–1 victory. Boniperti managed to achieve 38 caps (24 of which he played as captain) and scored 8 goals for Italy. Boniperti played for Italy in the 1950 and 1954 FIFA World Cup finals (captaining the team in the latter edition of the tournament), as well as in the 1952 Summer Olympics.

== Style of play ==
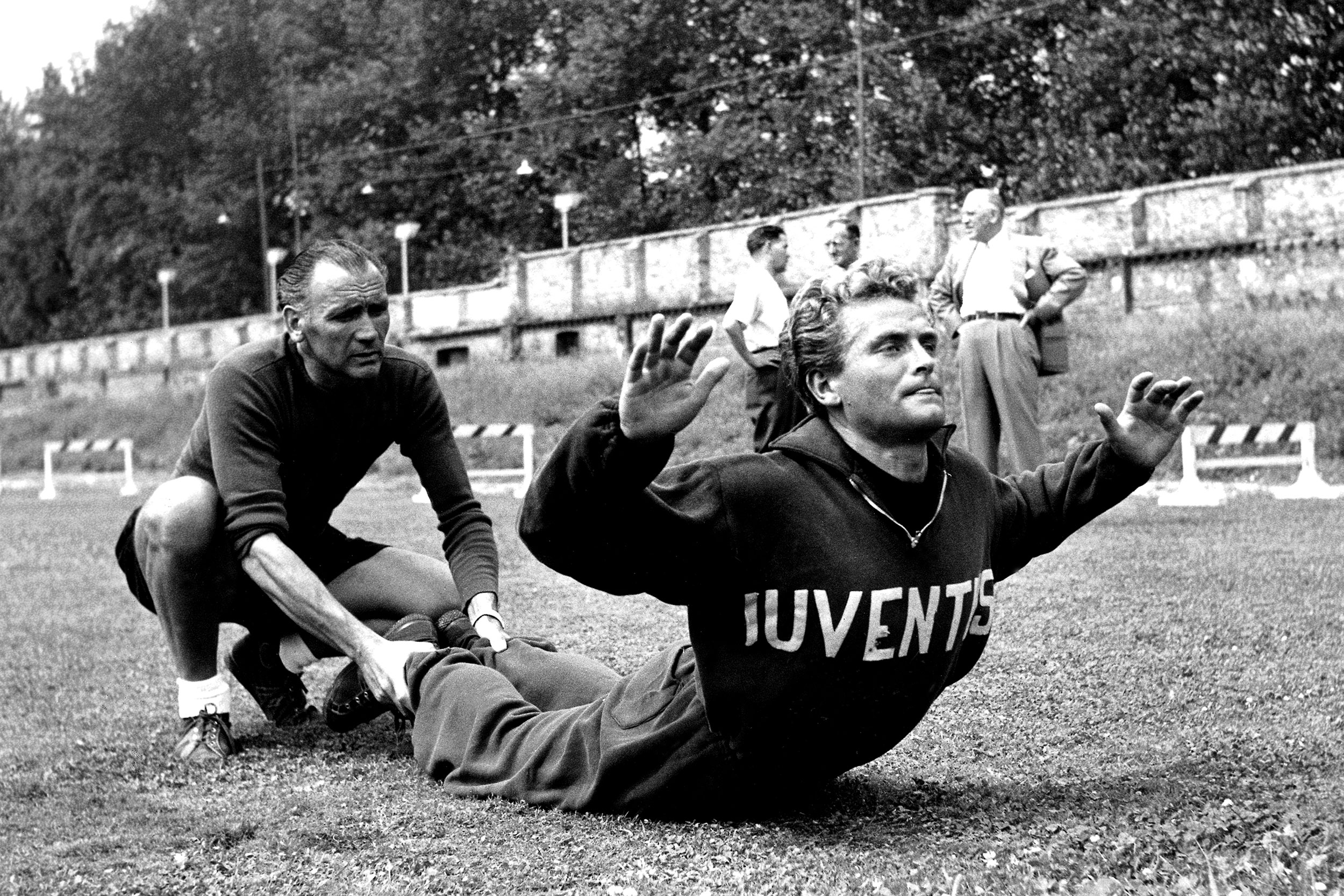
Boniperti (right) in training with Bianconeri in the 1951–52 season

A talented, creative, and prolific forward, with good technique, Boniperti is regarded by several pundits as one of the greatest and most successful Italian players of all time and is considered by some in the sport, including Alessandro Del Piero, as one of Juventus's greatest players ever. A forward, he began his career as a striker, making a name for himself due to his eye for goal, and later emerging to prominence as a goalscorer for much of his career; in this role, he was usually supported by teammates such as John and Karl Aage Hansen, and Karl Aage Præst. As a centre-forward, he was known for his ability in the air and for having the capacity to score with both feet, as well as his head. A team player, in the later part of his career, he moved into a deeper position, functioning as a second striker or inside forward, as an attacking midfielder, as a winger, or even as a central midfielder, as a defensive midfielder, or as a midfield playmaker. Due to his ball control, technical ability, vision, tactical intelligence, and passing range, he excelled as an assist provider during the final few years of his career, creatively supporting his more offensive teammates John Charles and Omar Sívori. In addition to his footballing ability, he was also known for his leadership.

== After retirement ==
=== Juventus executive ===
"Winning is not important, it's the only concern."

— Boniperti on Juventus' winning philosophy, at the inauguration of the Juventus Stadium, September 8, 2011.

A short while after his retirement, the Agnelli family offered Boniperti an executive position as a director in the club's management team; in 1971, he was appointed the chairman of the board of directors (Italian: presidente del consiglio di amministrazione), a position he held for many years, and still had a role at the club as one of the honorary chairmen (Italian: Presidenti Onorari, served along with Franzo Grande Stevens).

He often found the pressure of watching rather than playing quite unbearable, and was known to drive around Turin at halftime and just listen to the match on the radio. When players asked for pay rises, Boniperti would point to photographs of recent defeats on the wall and turn them away in shame. The pressure of remaining Italy's top team was intense for him, even behind the scenes.

=== Politics ===
From 1994 until 1999, Boniperti was elected as a deputy in the European Parliament with the centre-right wing party Forza Italia.

== Personal life ==
Boniperti's grandson Filippo has followed in his grandfather's footsteps in pursuing a career in football and played for Juventus and the Italy U19 team as a midfielder. He is currently a free agent.

Boniperti died in Turin on 17 June 2021 due to heart failure, aged 92. The Italy national team wore black armbands in tribute to him in their match on 20 June against Wales in the UEFA Euro 2020.

== Career statistics ==
=== Club ===
Appearances and goals by club, season and competition
Club	Season	League			National Cup		Continental		Total	
Club	Season	Division	Apps	Goals	Apps	Goals	Apps	Goals	Apps	Goals
Juventus	1946–47	Serie A	6	5	—		—		6	5
Juventus	1947–48	Serie A	40	27	—		—		41	28
Juventus	1948–49	Serie A	32	15	—		—		34	15
Juventus	1949–50	Serie A	35	21	—		—		35	21
Juventus	1950–51	Serie A	37	22	—		—		40	23
Juventus	1951–52	Serie A	33	19	—		—		35	22
Juventus	1952–53	Serie A	29	7	—		—		31	7
Juventus	1953–54	Serie A	30	14	—		—		30	14
Juventus	1954–55	Serie A	27	9	—		—		28	9
Juventus	1955–56	Serie A	31	6	—		—		31	6
Juventus	1956–57	Serie A	24	4	—		—		26	5
Juventus	1957–58	Serie A	34	8	6	1	—		34	8
Juventus	1958–59	Serie A	26	8	3	0	2	0	33	8
Juventus	1959–60	Serie A	31	7	3	0	—		36	7
Juventus	1960–61	Serie A	28	6	1	0	1	0	30	6
Career total			443	178	13	1	3 (Note: Boniperti also played in the Latin Cup and the Coppa dell'Amicizia unofficially.)	0	459	179

=== International ===
Appearances and goals by national team and year
National team	Year	Apps	Goals
Italy	1947	1	0
Italy	1948	0	0
Italy	1949	3	1
Italy	1950	3	0
Italy	1951	5	1
Italy	1952	4	0
Italy	1953	4	0
Italy	1954	4	3
Italy	1955	3	2
Italy	1956	3	0
Italy	1957	2	0
Italy	1958	3	0
Italy	1959	1	0
Italy	1960	2	1
Total		38	8

Scores and results list Italy's goal tally first, score column indicates score after each Boniperti goal.

List of international goals scored by Giampiero Boniperti
No.	Date	Venue	Opponent	Score	Result	Competition
1	22 May 1949	Stadio Comunale, Florence, Italy	Austria	3–0	3–1	1948–53 Central European International Cup
2	25 November 1951	Cornaredo Stadium, Lugano, Switzerland	Switzerland	1–1	1–1	1948–53 Central European International Cup
3	24 January 1954	San Siro, Milan, Italy	Egypt	3–1	5–1	1954 FIFA World Cup qualification
4	24 January 1954	San Siro, Milan, Italy	Egypt	5–1	5–1	1954 FIFA World Cup qualification
5	17 June 1954	Stade Olympique, Lausanne, Switzerland	Switzerland	1–1	1–2	1954 FIFA World Cup
6	16 January 1955	Stadio della Vittoria, Bari, Italy	Belgium	1–0	1–0	Friendly
7	18 December 1955	Stadio Olimpico, Rome, Italy	West Germany	2–1	2–1	Friendly
8	10 December 1960	Stadio San Paolo, Naples, Italy	Austria	1–1	1–2	Friendly

== Honours ==
Juventus

- Serie A: 1949–50, 1951–52, 1957–58, 1959–60, 1960–61
- Coppa Italia: 1958–59, 1959–60

Individual

- Serie A top scorer: 1947–48 (27 goals)
- Serie A Team of The Year: 1958, 1960
- FIFA 100: 2004
- Italian Football Hall of Fame: 2012
- CONI Award for Outstanding Sporting Career: 2013
- Juventus FC Hall of Fame: 2025

== See also ==
- List of one-club men in association football
