= Bertuccelli =

Bertuccelli is an Italian surname. Notable people with the surname include:

- Alberto Bertuccelli (1924–2002), Italian footballer
- Jean-Louis Bertuccelli (1942–2014), French film director and screenwriter
- Julie Bertuccelli (born 1968), French film director
- Valeria Bertuccelli (born 1969), Argentine actress
