= Giacomo Mari =

Italian footballer and manager

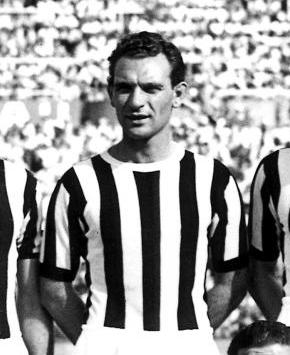
- Mari with Juventus in 1951

Personal information
- Full name: Giacomo Mari
- Date of birth: 17 October 1924
- Place of birth: Vescovato, Kingdom of Italy
- Date of death: 16 October 1991 (aged 66)
- Height: 1.76 m (5 ft 9 in)
- Position: Midfielder

Senior career*
| Years | Team | Apps | (Gls) |
| 1942–1946 | Cremonese | 23 | (0) |
| 1946–1949 | Atalanta | 83 | (8) |
| 1949–1953 | Juventus | 132 | (9) |
| 1953–1956 | Sampdoria | 72 | (3) |
| 1956–1960 | Padova | 120 | (3) |
| 1960–1961 | Cremonese | 28 | (1) |
| Total | | 458 | (24) |

International career
| 1948–1954 | Italy | 8 | (0) |

Managerial career
- 1961–1962: Calcio Padova
- * Club domestic league appearances and goals

Giacomo Mari (Italian pronunciation: [ˈdʒaːkomo ˈmaːri]; 17 October 1924 – 16 October 1991) was an Italian footballer who played as a midfielder.

== Club career ==
After three years of breaking in at Atalanta in his early career, Mari played four seasons with Juventus, winning two Serie A championships, playing alongside the great Carlo Parola. Before the 1954 World Cup, he went to Sampdoria and then concluded playing in Serie A with Padova.

== International career ==
Giacomo Mari is one of five Italian players (the others are Giampiero Boniperti, Gino Cappello, Ermes Muccinelli and Egisto Pandolfini) that played for Italy in both the 1950 and 1954 World Cups. With the Italy national team, he debuted at the 1948 London Olympics, against Paraguay; he also featured against Switzerland at the 1954 World Cup.

== Style of play ==
A tireless runner, Giacomo Mari was a classic halfback, waiting in the folds of midfield ready to halt the attack of the opposing forwards and wings.
