= Romolo Bizzotto =

Italian footballer and coach

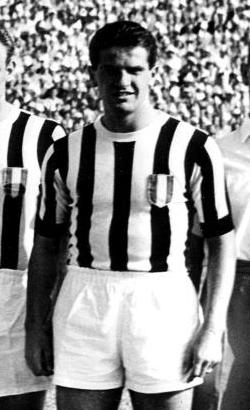
- Bizzotto with Juventus in the 1950–51 season

Personal information
- Date of birth: 16 February 1925
- Place of birth: Cerea, Italy
- Date of death: 27 March 2017 (aged 92)
- Place of death: Turin, Italy
- Position: Midfielder

Senior career*
Years	Team	Apps	(Gls)
1942–1944	Audace S. Michele Extra		
1945–1949	Verona	125	(10)
1949–1952	Juventus	46	(2)
1952–1953	SPAL	10	(0)
1953–1954	Palermo	22	(1)
1954–1955	Carrarese	25	(0)
1955–1957	Lucchese	32	(3)
1958–1959	Rovereto		

Managerial career
- 1958–1959: Rovereto
- 1960–1961: Verona
- 1962–1965: Rimini
- 1965–1970: Reggiana
- 1970–1975: Reggina
- * Club domestic league appearances and goals

Romolo Bizzotto (16 February 1925 – 27 March 2017) was an Italian professional football player and coach who played as a midfielder. He was born in Cerea, Province of Verona. He represented Italy at the 1948 Summer Olympics.

== Honours ==
Juventus

- Serie A champion: 1949–50, 1951–52.
