= Karl Aage Præst =

Danish footballer (1922-2011)

Karl Aage Praest
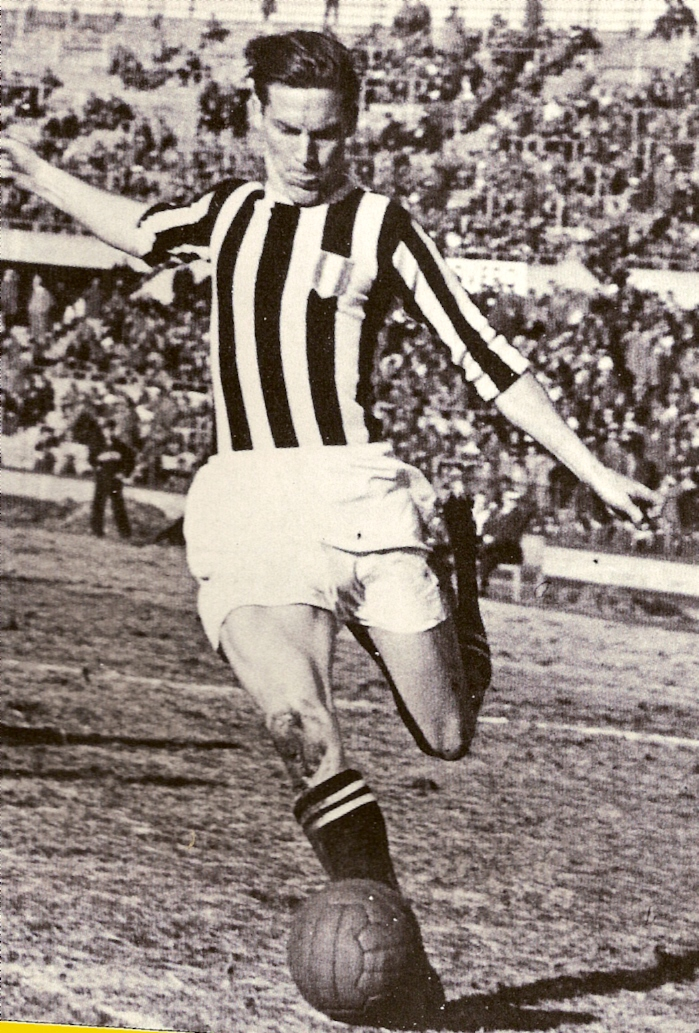
- Præst in action with Juventus in the 1950s

Personal information
- Date of birth: 26 February 1922
- Place of birth: Copenhagen, Denmark
- Date of death: 19 November 2011 (aged 89)
- Place of death: Frederiksberg, Denmark
- Position: Left winger

Youth career
- 1936–1940: Østerbros Boldklub

Senior career*
| Years | Team | Apps | (Gls) |
| 1940–1949 | Østerbros Boldklub | 250 | (?) |
| 1949–1956 | Juventus | 232 | (51) |
| 1956–1957 | Lazio | 7 | (0) |

International career
| 1945–1949 | Denmark | 24 | (17) |
- * Club domestic league appearances and goals

Karl Aage Præst, also spelled Carl Aage Præst, (26 February 1922 – 19 November 2011) was a Danish football player. Playing in the left winger position, Præst won two Serie A championships with Italian club Juventus FC. He played 24 games and scored 17 goals for the Danish national team from 1945 to 1949, and won a bronze medal at the 1948 Summer Olympics. He is a Danish Football Hall of Fame inductee.

== Career ==
Born in Copenhagen, Karl Aage Præst attended the Royal Orphanage. The orphanage became the youth team of football club Østerbros Boldklub (ØB) in 1936, and Præst was among the first boys to join ØB. In his second year in the ØB youth team, Præst scored 57 goals in 16 games. He made his senior debut in 1940. At ØB, he played alongside later Danish international Helge Broneé. Præst was acknowledged as a world-class talent, with great balance and dribbling, and a great end-product of either precise crossing or a good shot on goal. Præst played around 250 games while at ØB.

Præst became internationally known through international exhibition games for Danish representative teams Stævnet and Alliancen, and made his debut for the Denmark national football team in June 1945. In May 1947, he was selected for the Europe XI representative team, which lost 1–6 to the Great Britain national football team. Præst was a part of the Danish team at the 1948 Summer Olympics in London, where Præst played four games and scored two goals as Denmark won a bronze medal. After the Olympics, Præst signed a professional contract with Italian club Juventus FC, and was thus banned from the amateur-only Danish national team.

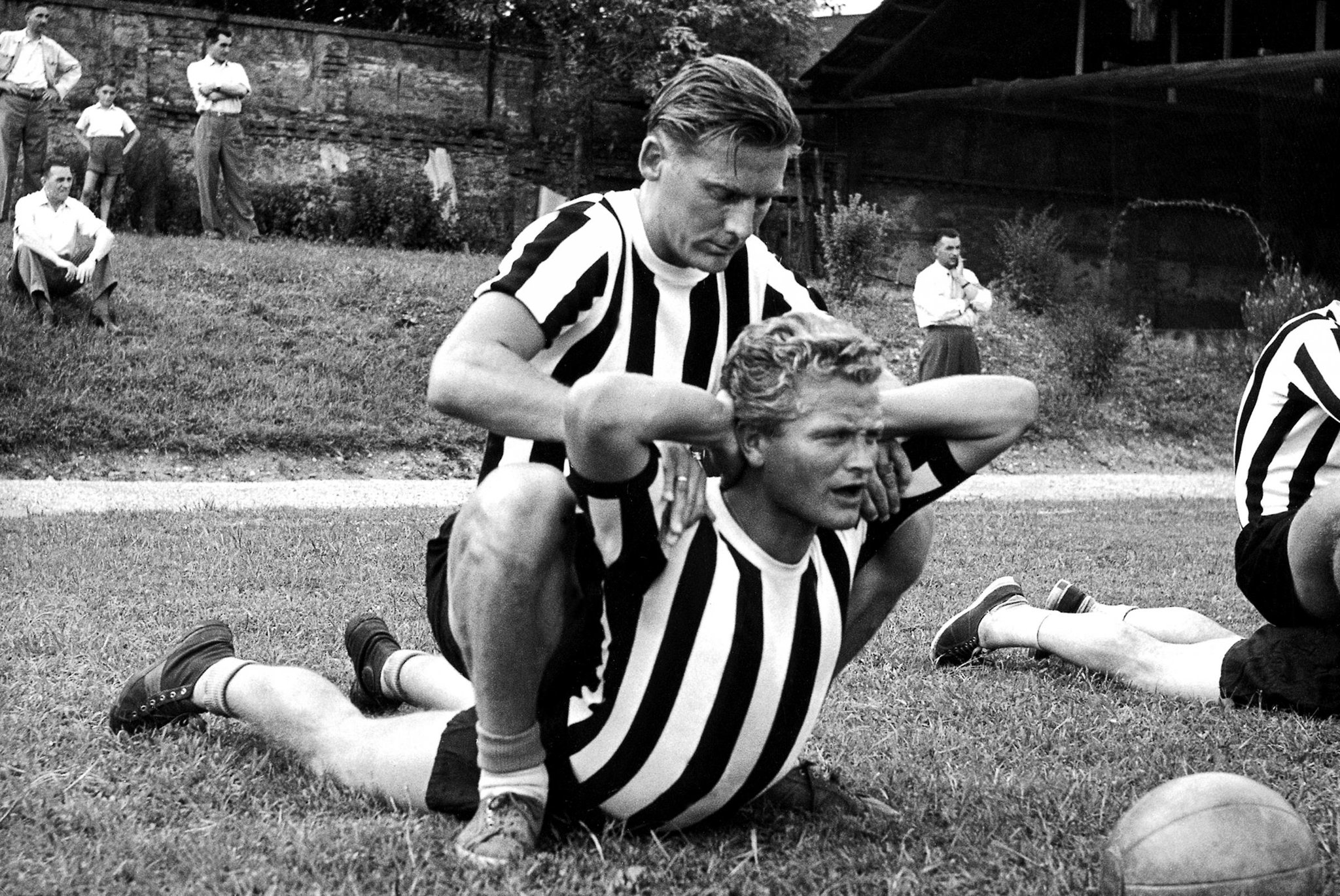
Præst (top) and Boniperti in training with Juventus at the turn of the 1940s and 1950s.

With Juventus, Præst won the 1949–50 and 1951–52 Serie A championships. Though considered fast in Denmark, Præst was not as fast as most Italian defenders, but succeeded through his dribbling skills. Præst played alongside Danes John Hansen and Karl Aage Hansen at Juventus, and his dribbling and crossing ability was a key in making John Hansen top goal-scorer of the 1951–52 season. Præst played 232 games and scored 51 goals for Juventus in the Serie A championship from 1949 to 1956. In 1956, Præst moved on to league rivals S.S. Lazio. He played seven games for the club, before ending his career in 1957.

Upon his return to Denmark, Præst's status as ex-professional meant the Danish Football Association (DBU) kept him banned from playing in the Danish leagues. Præst and John Hansen had both bought vacation homes in Liseleje, and Præst's summer residence "Juve" was soon the gathering place of the 1948 Olympics team. The team was reformed, amateurs and ex-professionals alike, and played a string of unofficial high-profile exhibition matches that drew many spectators. This provoked DBU to move on the issue of ex-professionals, and it was decided that following a quarantine of two years, ex-professionals were allowed to re-enter the Danish football league.

At ØB's 75th anniversary in 1969, Præst and Flemming Nielsen arranged an old boys exhibition match between the 1948 Olympic team and Juventus FC, with the proceeds going to ØB. In November 2008, Præst was voted into the Danish Football Hall of Fame, for his achievements with Juventus FC and the Danish national team.

Præst died on 19 November 2011 at age 89.

== Honours ==
Olympic medal record

Men's Football

Representing Denmark
| Bronze medal – third place | 1948 London | Team competition |

=== Club ===
Østerbros Boldklub

- KBUs Pokalturnering: 1947

Juventus FC

- Serie A: 1949–50, 1951–52

=== Individual ===
- Copa Rio Team of the Tournament: 1951
- Serie A Team of The Year: 1953, 1954
