= Gino Giaroli =

Italian footballer

Personal information
- Full name: Gino Giaroli
- Date of birth: 27 June 1924
- Place of birth: Reggio Emilia, Italy
- Date of death: 23 May 1991 (aged 66)
- Place of death: Reggio Emilia, Italy
- Position: Defender

Youth career
- Reggiana

Senior career*
Years	Team	Apps	(Gls)
1945–1949	Reggiana	115	(2)
1949–1954	Palermo	151	(7)
1954–1958	Lanerossi Vicenza	113	(6)
1958–1960	Moglia	31	(0)
Total		410	(15)

Managerial career
- 1954: Palermo (player-manager)
- 1959-1960: Moglia (player-manager)
- 1960-1962: Reggiana (assistant)
- 1963-1964: Schio
- 1964-1965: Quartu Sant’Elena
- 1965-1966: Carpi
- 1970-1971: Como
- 1971-1972: Pistoiese
- * Club domestic league appearances and goals as of 17:48, 9 December 2014 (UTC)

Gino Giaroli (27 June 1924 – 23 May 1991) was an Italian footballer, active mainly during the 1950s. He is the second all-time capped player of Palermo in Serie A, with 151 caps, many as club captain.

== Career ==
Giaroli was born in Reggio Emilia in 1924, and took part in World War II as a private soldier in the Italian Navy on the Italian cruiser Bolzano.

In the aftermath of the Armistice of Cassibile, the cruiser, which was docked in La Spezia for repairs, was left afloat by Italian and Allied forces, while the serving soldiers were left without any order. Giaroli and other Italians were captured by the Wehrmacht in Toulon and taken to Trier in Germany, where they were freed by American forces at the end of the war.

At the end of the war, Giaroli returned to Reggio Emilia and came through the youth ranks of Reggiana, becoming a starter for its local club for four seasons thanks to the appreciation of Hungarian manager János Vanicsek.

He was then acquired by Palermo in 1949, where he spent six seasons, becoming the team captain and an iconic figure in the history of the Sicilian club. During his tenure with the "rosanero", he played with Şükrü Gülesin, Čestmír Vycpálek, Aredio Gimona, Ferruccio Santamaria and Enrique Martegani among others; the club was owned by count Raimondo Lanzia di Trabia, who refused to sell Giaroli to A.C. Milan. During the time in Palermo, he was capped by the Italy national team B. In 1950 he was inadvertently arrested for desertion, after having not completed his conscription period, but he was quickly released as it was proven he couldn't complete it as at the time he was imprisoned in Germany.

Giaroli transferred to Veneto side Lanerossi Vicenza, where he spent four seasons, becoming the captain of the club.

After his retirement in 1958, Giaroli started to coach in Reggiana youth teams and became an assistant of Luigi Del Grosso in the first team.

He then managed Schio, Como, Pistoiese and Carpi and later retired and opened some businesses in Reggio Emilia. He died of cancer in 1991.
