= Giovanni Viola =

Italian footballer

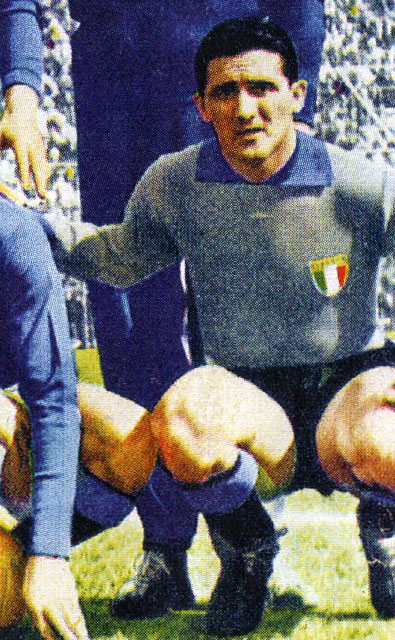
- Viola with Italy national team in 1956

Personal information
- Date of birth: 20 June 1926
- Place of birth: San Benigno Canavese, Italy
- Date of death: 7 July 2008 (aged 82)
- Place of death: Turin, Italy
- Height: 1.79 m (5 ft 10 1/2 in)
- Position: Goalkeeper

Senior career*
Years	Team	Apps	(Gls)
1945–1958	Juventus	245	(0)
1946–1947	→ Carrarese (loan)	33	(0)
1947–1948	→ Como (loan)	33	(0)
1948–1949	→ Lucchese (loan)	33	(0)
1958–1959	Brescia	27	(0)
Total		371	(0)

International career
1954–1956	Italy	11	(0)
- * Club domestic league appearances and goals

Giovanni Viola (Italian pronunciation: [dʒoˈvanni viˈɔːla; ˈvjɔː-]; 20 June 1926 – 7 July 2008) was an Italian footballer who played as a goalkeeper. Although he represented several Italian clubs throughout his career, he is mostly remembered for his successful stint with Juventus, where he won three Serie A titles. At international level, he represented the Italy national football team at the 1954 FIFA World Cup.

== Club career ==
During his club career, Viola played for Italian side Juventus from 1945 to 1958. He was brought in as a replacement for Lucidio Sentimenti (IV), and made 246 appearances for the Turin club, winning the Scudetto on three occasions: in 1950, 1952 and 1958. He also played for Carrarese, Como, Lucchese, and Brescia.

== International career ==
At international level, Viola also played 11 matches for the Italy between 1954 and 1956. He made his debut at the 1954 FIFA World Cup, in the 4–1 first round play-off defeat of Switzerland.

== Style of play ==
Viola is regarded as one of the most consistent Italian goalkeepers of his generation, and considered among Juventus’ greatest goalkeepers of all-time. Known for his composure, reliability, and efficiency, he was an effective shot-stopper; who combined strong positional sense with agility and athleticism. This enabled him to make acrobatic saves when necessary.

== Honours ==
Juventus

- Serie A: 1949–50, 1951–52 and 1957–58

Individual

- Copa Rio Team of the Tournament: 1951
