= Alberto Piccinini (footballer) =

Italian footballer (1923–1972)

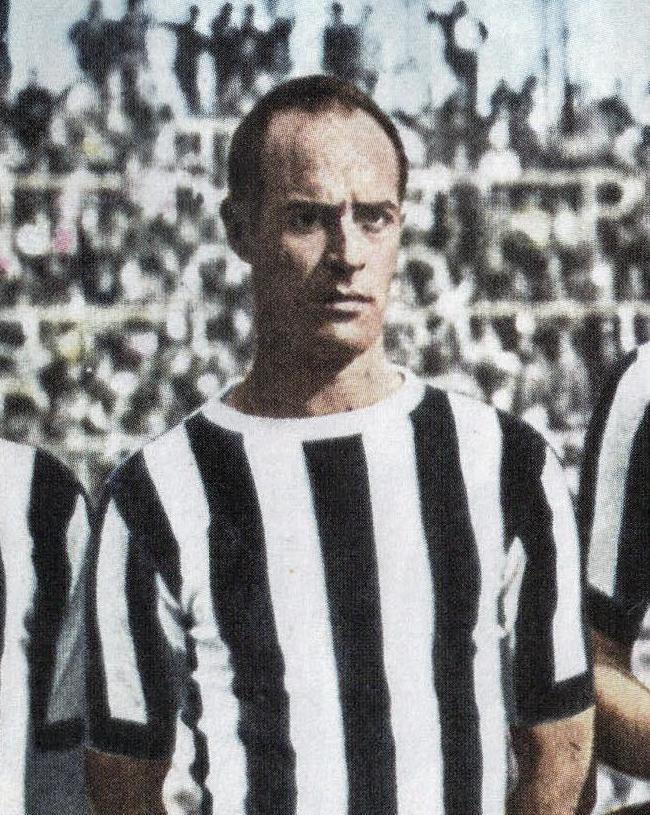
- Piccinini with Juventus in the 1951–52 season

Personal information
- Date of birth: 25 January 1923
- Place of birth: Rome, Kingdom of Italy
- Date of death: 14 April 1972 (aged 49)
- Place of death: Rome, Italy
- Position: Midfielder

Senior career*
Years	Team	Apps	(Gls)
1942–1943	Pescara	4	(1)
1943–1944	Avia Roma	18	(0)
1944–1945	Roma	14	(0)
1945–1948	Salernitana	43	(0)
1948–1949	Palermo	36	(0)
1949–1953	Juventus	104	(2)
1953–1954	Milan	19	(0)
1954–1955	Palermo	13	(1)

International career
1949–1952	Italy	5	(0)
- * Club domestic league appearances and goals

Alberto Piccinini (25 January 1923 – 14 April 1972) was an Italian professional footballer who played as a midfielder. According to Guerin Sportivo, he was regarded as one of the first liberos when Gipo Viani, his coach at Salernitana, pulled him back to defence and assigned him to mark the opposition's number 9.

He later played for Juventus, Milan and Palermo, winning two Serie A titles with Juventus in 1949–50 and 1951–52.

== Honours ==
- Juventus F.C.
  - Serie A champion: 1949–50, 1951–52.
