= Sergio Manente =

Italian footballer and coach

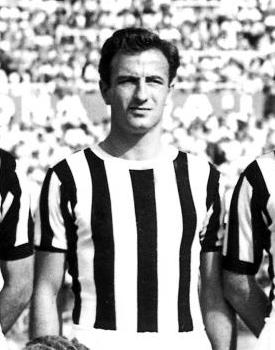
- Manente with Juventus in 1951

Personal information
- Date of birth: 10 December 1924
- Place of birth: Udine, Kingdom of Italy
- Date of death: 14 March 1993 (aged 68)
- Place of death: Udine, Italy
- Height: 1.76 m (5 ft 9 1/2 in)
- Position: Defender

Senior career*
Years	Team	Apps	(Gls)
1942–1944	Udinese	13	(3)
1945–1946	Udinese	12	(2)
1946–1948	Atalanta	58	(4)
1948–1955	Juventus	231	(15)
1955–1957	L.R. Vicenza	51	(12)
1957–1960	Udinese	36	(3)

International career
1952	Italy	1	(0)

Managerial career
- 1961–1962: Udinese
- 1962–1963: Vittorio Veneto
- 1963–1964: Pordenone
- 1964–1968: Treviso
- 1968–1969: Marzotto Valdagno
- 1969–1971: Alessandria
- 1971–1972: Venezia
- 1972–1973: Sandonà
- 1973–1975: Udinese
- 1976–1977: Giulianova
- * Club domestic league appearances and goals

Sergio Manente (Italian pronunciation: [ˈsɛrdʒo maˈnɛnte]; 10 December 1924 – 14 March 1993) was an Italian professional football player and coach who played as a defender.

== Honours ==
Juventus

- Serie A champion: 1949–50, 1951–52.

Individual

- Serie A Team of The Year: 1952, 1955
