= Filippo Cavalli =

Italian footballer

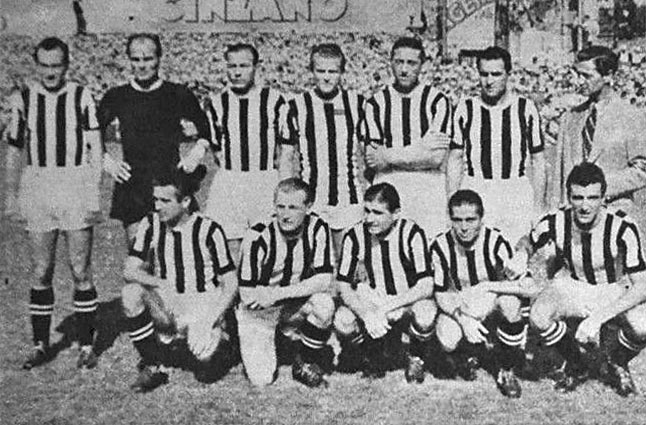
- Filippo Cavalli (back row, second from left) as part of Juventus in 1947

Personal information
- Date of birth: January 29, 1921
- Place of birth: Casale Monferrato, Italy
- Date of death: April 29, 2004 (aged 83)
- Place of death: Treviso, Italy
- Height: 1.78 m (5 ft 10 in)
- Position: Goalkeeper

Senior career*
Years	Team	Apps	(Gls)
1939–1940	Casale	28	(0)
1940–1943	Torino	21	(0)
1943–1944	Casale	15	(0)
1945–1946	Como	15	(0)
1946–1953	Juventus	26	(0)
1953–1954	Internazionale	0	(0)
1954–1955	Pavia	26	(0)
1955–1957	Casale	29	(0)
- * Club domestic league appearances and goals

Filippo Cavalli (January 29, 1921 – April 29, 2004) was an Italian professional footballer who played as a goalkeeper.

== Honours ==
=== Club ===
Torino

- Serie A champion: 1942–43.
- Coppa Italia winner: 1942–43.

Juventus

- Serie A champion: 1949–50, 1951–52.
