= Pasquale Vivolo =

Italian footballer

Personal information
- Date of birth: 6 January 1928
- Place of birth: Brusciano, Italy
- Date of death: 18 November 2002 (aged 74)
- Place of death: Cremona, Italy
- Height: 1.79 m (5 ft 10 1/2 in)
- Position: Striker

Senior career*
Years	Team	Apps	(Gls)
1947–1949	Cremonese	40	(10)
1949–1953	Juventus	67	(31)
1953–1958	Lazio	121	(32)
1958–1959	Brescia	1	(0)

International career
1952–1953	Italy	4	(1)
- * Club domestic league appearances and goals

Pasquale Vivolo (Italian pronunciation: [paˈskwaːle ˈviːvolo]; 6 January 1928 – 18 November 2002) was an Italian professional footballer who played as a striker.

== Honours ==
=== Club ===
Juventus

- Serie A champion: 1949–50, 1951–52.

=== International ===
- Represented Italy at the 1952 Summer Olympics.
