= John Hansen (footballer, born 1924) =

Danish footballer

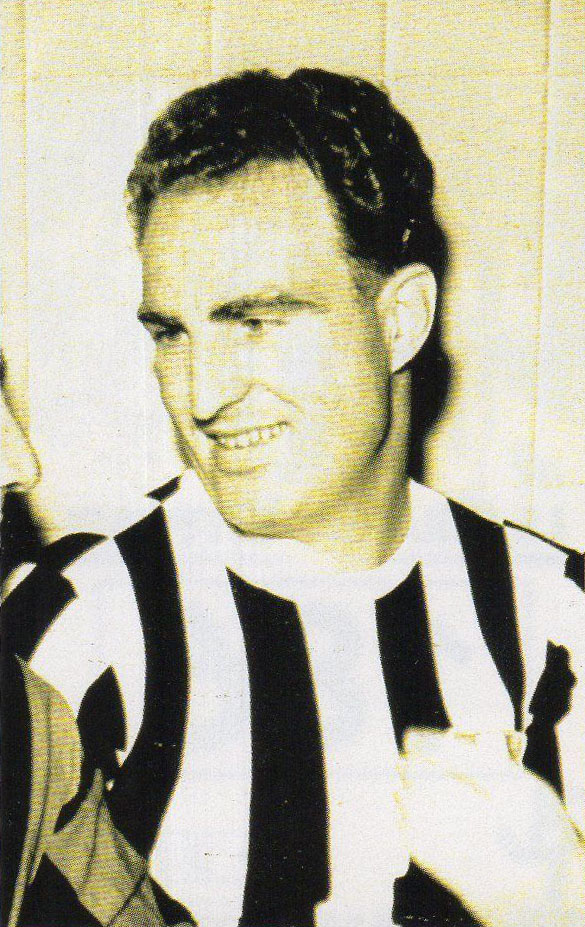
- Hansen with Juventus in the early 1950s

Personal information
- Full name: John Angelo Valdemar; Østergaard Hansen
- Date of birth: 24 June 1924
- Place of birth: Copenhagen, Denmark
- Date of death: 12 January 1990 (aged 65)
- Place of death: Copenhagen, Denmark
- Height: 1.87 m (6 ft 2 in)
- Positions: Inside forward; left winger

Senior career*
Years	Team	Apps	(Gls)
1943–1948	BK Frem	86	(81)
1948–1954	Juventus	187	(124)
1954–1955	Lazio	27	(15)
1957–1960	BK Frem	28	(32)
Total		328	(252)

International career
1947	Denmark U23	1	(1)
1948	Denmark	8	(10)

Managerial career
- 1956–1957: BK Frem
- 1969: Denmark
Medal record
Representing Denmark
Men's Football
Bronze medal – third place	1948 London	Team competition
- * Club domestic league appearances and goals

John Angelo Valdemar Østergaard Hansen, known simply as John Hansen, (24 June 1924 – 12 January 1990) was a Danish footballer who played as a forward. He played professionally for seven years in Italy: he scored 124 goals in 187 matches for Juventus FC, and won two Serie A championships with the club, finishing as Capocannoniere top-goal scorer in the 1951–52 Serie A season; he later also played for Italian club S.S. Lazio. He won the 1944 Danish championship with childhood club BK Frem. Hansen scored 10 goals in eight games for the Denmark national football team in 1948, and won a bronze medal with Denmark at the 1948 Summer Olympics. In 1985, Hansen received the Italian order of chivalry.

He was the son of Danish international goalkeeper Niels Peder Hansen, who also played for BK Frem, and was the father of Henning Hansen, who played for BK Frem in the late 1960s and early 1970s.

== Playing career ==
=== Amateur career ===
Born in Frederiksberg, Hansen started his career with Copenhagen club BK Frem in the amateur-only Danish league. He played as a left inside wing, was a world-class header of the ball, and could kick the ball equally hard with both legs. With BK Frem, Hansen won the 1944 Danish championship, and was the top goal-scorer of the 1948 Danish championship tournament.

Hansen made his debut for the Danish national team in June 1948, and scored three goals in his first two international games. Playing in the Danish amateur league and having played just two international games, he was not well known outside Scandinavia until he was selected for the Danish team at the 1948 Summer Olympics in London. Hansen scored seven goals in four games as Denmark won bronze medals at the tournament, including four goals in Denmark's 5–3 win against the Italy national team. Hansen's Olympic performance made his name well known across Europe, and drew the attention of several Italian teams. He signed a professional contract in late 1948, which spelled the end of his career in the amateur-only Danish national team following eight games and 10 goals in the span of four months.

=== Professional career ===
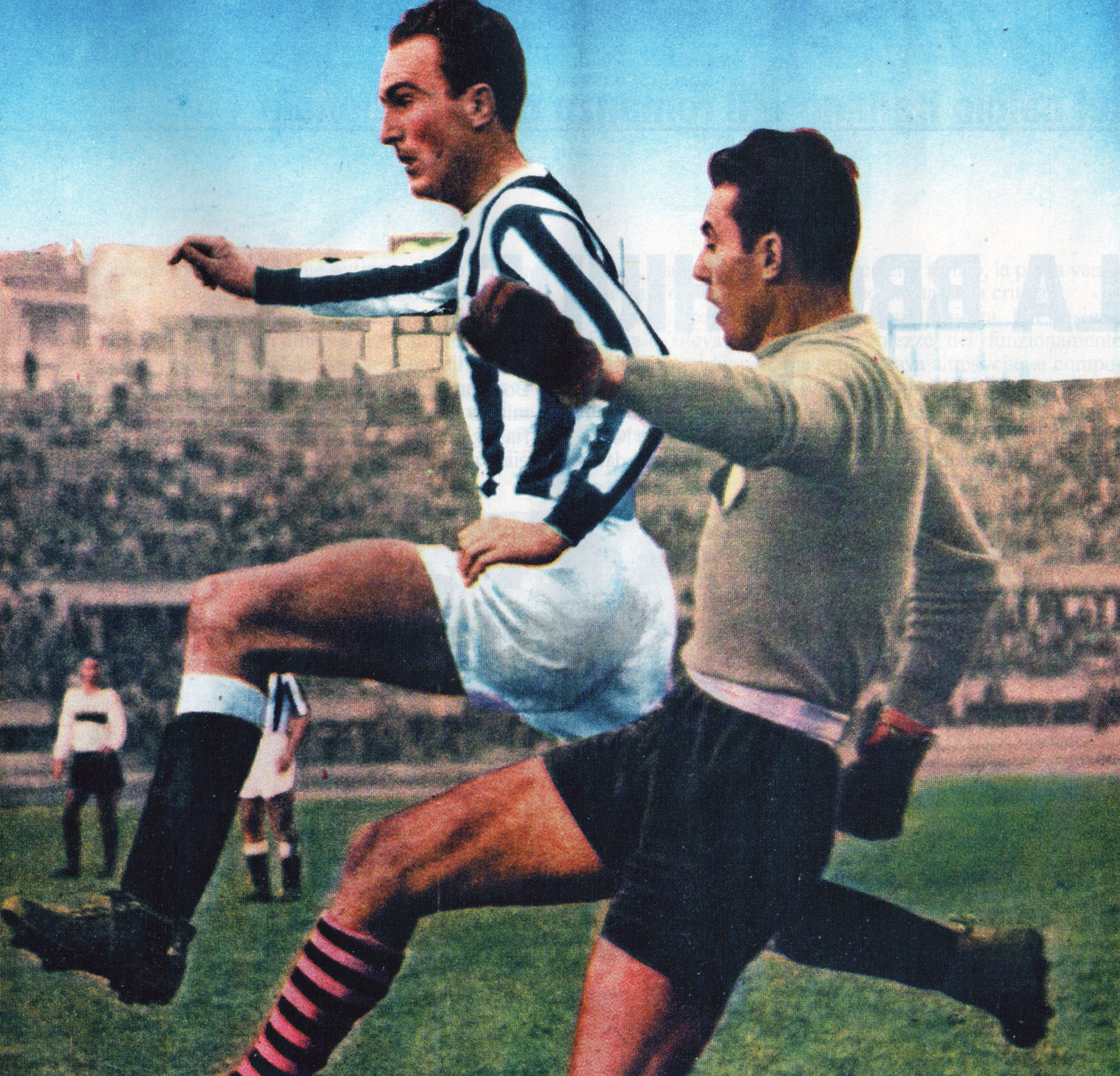
Hansen playing for Bianconeri in the 1951–52 season

Hansen was almost hired by Italian club A.C. Torino, but arch rival Turin club Juventus FC eventually secured Hansen's signature. BK Frem's president got a call from a director at Nordisk FIAT Copenhagen, referred by FIAT and Juventus owner Gianni Agnelli, who desperately wanted him to sign Hansen for his club. As Hansen was an amateur, he was free to move and promptly signed a three-year contract with Juventus on 16 November 1948 for DKK111,111.11 ($23,500). He was given the number 10 shirt, and made his debut three days later against A.S. Bari. Hansen's first season did not start well for a tall and strong man not used to work on defense, and after 12 games the Italy national team coach was called just to verify that he was the same player who had scored the four goals against them at the Olympics. Hansen ended his first season with 15 goals in 24 games.

In his second season, Jesse Carver replaced fellow Englishman William Chalmers as head coach of Juventus, and a less rigid and physically demanding training schedule paid off for Hansen. In the 1949–50 Juventus team, Hansen had an irreplaceable partner in another Danish player from the 1948 Olympics team, Karl Aage Præst. Præst was a left winger with electric dribbling skills who scattered opponents through the field and produced precise crosses to Hansen, who netted them thanks to his violent and precise header. Juventus won the 1949–50 Serie A championship with Hansen scoring 28 goals in 37 games.

In 1950, Hansen and Præst were joined by another Dane, captain of the 1948 Olympic team Karl Aage Hansen, who came from Serie A league rivals Atalanta Bergamo. The great level of understanding of those three great Danes made John Hansen feel as if he could play with his eyes closed, showing all of his skills. He was known as a goal scorer. Though he was not fast by Serie A standard, he understood getting unmarked and losing his defender, and had a feeling for being at the right spot on the right moment. During the 1951–52 Serie A season, Hansen scored 30 goals, earning him the "Capocannoniere" Italian top goal-scorer title, as he won his second Serie A championship with Juventus. He spent six seasons at Juventus where he scored 124 goals in 187 games in the Serie A.

He moved to league rivals S.S. Lazio in 1954, where he played for one season and scored 15 goals in 27 games. He ended his Italian adventure in 1955 and moved back to Denmark. The strictly amateur Danish Football Association would not allow ex-professional John Hansen to play in the Danish leagues, and he and fellow Olympic teammate and ex-professional Jørgen Leschly Sørensen took to playing exhibition games. These games had free admittance and gathered such large crowds, that the Danish Football Association in 1958 decided to allow ex-professionals to reenter the Danish league, albeit only after serving a two-year quarantine. Hansen returned to play for BK Frem, where he ended his playing career in 1960.

== Coaching career ==
During his ban from playing football in 1956 and 1957, Hansen coached BK Frem alongside Erling Sørensen. In February 1969, Hansen became a member of the selection committee which selected the players for the Danish national team. At the same time he agreed a one-year deal to replace Erik Hansen as part-time tactical coach of the national team, where he worked in tandem with physical trainer Henry From. They managed Denmark to five victories, one draw, and three defeats in nine games. When the year was up, Hansen refused to prolong the arrangement, urging the Football Association to hire a full-time national team coach. Austrian Rudi Strittich was named national team coach in 1970, replacing both Hansen and From, and John Hansen went on to only serve in the selection committee.

== Career statistics ==
=== International goals ===
Scores and results list Denmark's goal tally first.

#	Date	Venue	Opponent	Score	Result	Competition
1	15 June 1948	Helsinki, Finland	Finland	1–0	3–0	1948–51 NC
2	26 June 1948	Copenhagen, Denmark	Poland	4–0	8–0	Friendly match
3	26 June 1948	Copenhagen, Denmark	Poland	7–0	8–0	Friendly match
4	5 August 1948	London, UK	Italy	1–0	5–3	1948 OG
5	5 August 1948	London, UK	Italy	2–1	5–3	1948 OG
6	5 August 1948	London, UK	Italy	3–2	5–3	1948 OG
7	5 August 1948	London, UK	Italy	4–3	5–3	1948 OG
8	10 August 1948	London, UK	Sweden	2–4	2–4	1948 OG
9	13 August 1948	London, UK	Great Britain	2–1	5–3	1948 OG
10	13 August 1948	London, UK	Great Britain	5–3	5–3	1948 OG

== Honours ==
Olympic medal record

Men's Football
Bronze medal – third place	1948 London	Team competition

=== Club ===
Frem

- Danish football championship: 1943–44

Juventus

- Serie A: 1949–50, 1951–52

=== International ===
Denmark

- Olympic Bronze Medal: 1948

=== Individual ===
- Danish 1st Division Top Goalscorer: 1947–48
- Summer Olympic Football Tournament Top-scorer: 1948
- Corriere dello Sport's Serie A Team of The Year: 1951, 1952
- Capocannoniere: 1951–52
- Juventus FC Hall of Fame: 2025
