= Lelio Antoniotti =

Italian footballer (1928–2014)

Personal information
- Date of birth: 17 January 1928
- Place of birth: Bard, Italy
- Date of death: 29 March 2014 (aged 86)
- Position: Striker

Senior career*
Years	Team	Apps	(Gls)
1945–1946	Sparta Novara		
1946–1951	Pro Patria	119	(48)
1951–1953	Lazio	53	(10)
1953–1956	Torino	78	(13)
1956–1957	Juventus	18	(2)
1957–1958	L.R. Vicenza	16	(1)
1958–1959	Novara	7	(0)
- * Club domestic league appearances and goals

Lelio Antoniotti (17 January 1928 – 29 March 2014) was an Italian football player.
