= Rino Ferrario =

Italian footballer (1926–2012)

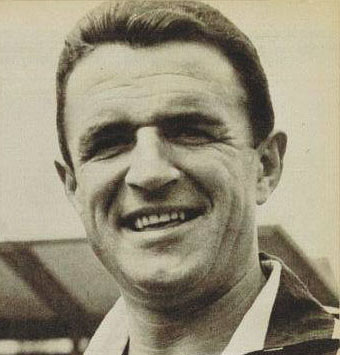
- Ferrario with Juventus in the late 1950s

Personal information
- Date of birth: 7 December 1926
- Place of birth: Albiate Brianza, Italy
- Date of death: 19 September 2012 (aged 85)
- Height: 1.86 m (6 ft 1 in)
- Position: Midfielder

Senior career*
| Years | Team | Apps | (Gls) |
| 1947–1949 | Arezzo | 46 | (2) |
| 1949–1950 | Lucchese | 31 | (1) |
| 1950–1955 | Juventus | 97 | (3) |
| 1955–1956 | Inter | 29 | (1) |
| 1956–1957 | Triestina | 32 | (2) |
| 1957–1959 | Juventus | 47 | (3) |
| 1959–1961 | Torino | 27 | (5) |
| Total | | 309 | (17) |

International career
| 1952–1958 | Italy | 10 | (0) |
- * Club domestic league appearances and goals

Rino Ferrario (Italian pronunciation: [ˈriːno ferˈraːrjo]; 7 December 1926 – 19 September 2012) was an Italian footballer who played as a midfielder.

== Club career ==
As a defensive midfielder, Ferrario became a starter at Juventus, winning the position from Carlo Parola. At Juventus, he won two Serie A championships, the first in 1952 and the other in 1958 as well as one Coppa Italia before ending his career with cross-city rivals Torino at thirty-five years of age.

== International career ==
Ferrario was one of five players selected to represent the Italy national team at the 1954 World Cup that did not play during the cup (among others; Sergio Cervato, Leonardo Costagliola, Guido Gratton and, Gino Pivatelli). A notable instance with the national team at Budapest was Ferrario's confrontation with Hungary's local hero Kocsis in a 1955 game where Italy lost 2–0, which nearly started a riot between the Italians and Magyars. For the 'Azzurri', he earned 10 caps between 1952 and 1958 and was praised for his consistent performances. He was also a member of the Italian team that took part in the 1952 Summer Olympics, however he did not participate in any matches.

== Style of play ==
One of the largest players to ever have played on the Italy national team at the time, he was nicknamed 'Mobilia' for his rugby player-like physique. He was also called "The Belfast Lion" for fiercely defending himself in Belfast during a pitch invasion by angry opposing fans.
