= Franz Grill =

Franz Grill, Hungarian: Grill Ferencz (Grill Ferenc) (c. 1756–1793) was a composer of the Classical Era. He was a composer of piano and chamber music. Little is known of his life, but he died on 18 August 1793 in Ödenburg also known as Sopron, Hungary.

== Compositions ==
- Op. 1 – Three Sonatas for Violin and Piano
- Op. 2 – Three Sonatas for Violin and Piano (opp. 1 and 2 were published by Franz Anton Hoffmeister titled Six Duos concertants)
- Op. 3 – Three String Quartets (Dedicated to Joseph Haydn)
- Op. 4 – Three Sonatas for Violin and Piano
- Op. 5 – Three String Quartets
- Op. 6 – Three Sonatas for Violin and Piano
- Op. 7 – Six String Quartets (C major, E♭, B♭ major, G minor, D major, A major)
- Two cycles of each 12 minuets
- German Dances
- Several smaller piano works, such as a "Rondeau et Final in Dis"
