= Francesco La Rosa =

Italian footballer (1926–2020)

Personal information
- Date of birth: 9 December 1926
- Place of birth: Messina, Italy
- Date of death: 8 April 2020 (aged 93)
- Place of death: Milan, Italy
- Position: Forward

Senior career*
Years	Team	Apps	(Gls)
1947–1949	Laveno-Mombello	?	(?)
1949–1952	Pro Patria	69	(19)
1952–1953	Triestina	21	(1)
1953–1954	Palermo	15	(5)
1954–1957	Pro Patria	60	(10)
1957–1959	Saronno	?	(?)
1960–1961	Sondrio	12	(?)

International career
1952	Italy	2	(0)
- * Club domestic league appearances and goals

Francesco La Rosa (Italian pronunciation: [franˈtʃesko la ˈrɔːza]; 9 December 1926 – 8 April 2020) was an Italian footballer who played as a forward. He competed in the men's tournament at the 1952 Summer Olympics.
