= Alberto Bertuccelli =

Italian footballer (1924–2002)

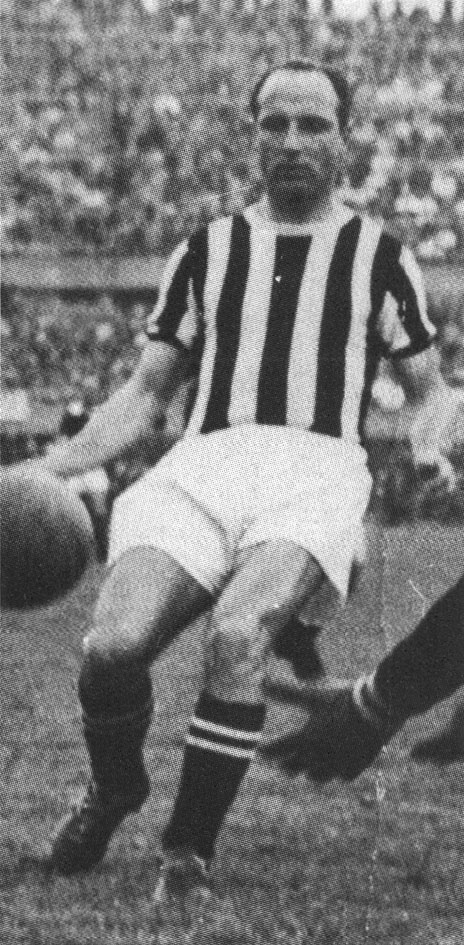
- Bertuccelli with Juventus in the early 1950s

Personal information
- Date of birth: 14 January 1924
- Place of birth: Viareggio, Kingdom of Italy
- Date of death: 15 August 2002 (aged 78)
- Place of death: Viareggio, Italy
- Position: Defender

Senior career*
Years	Team	Apps	(Gls)
1942–1943	Pontedera		
1945–1946	Viareggio	21	(2)
1946–1949	Lucchese	93	(0)
1949–1954	Juventus	144	(2)
1954–1955	Roma	6	(0)

International career
1949–1952	Italy	6	(0)
- * Club domestic league appearances and goals

Alberto Bertuccelli (Italian pronunciation: [alˈbɛrto bertutˈtʃɛlli]; 14 January 1924 – 15 August 2002) was an Italian professional footballer who played as a defender.

== Honours ==
Juventus

- Serie A champion: 1949–50, 1951–52.
