= Enrico Boniforti =

Italian footballer (1917-1991)

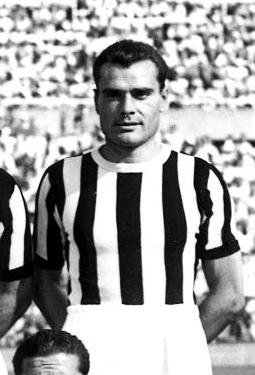
- Boniforti with Juventus in 1951

Personal information
- Date of birth: 7 December 1917
- Place of birth: Saronno, Italy
- Date of death: 18 November 1991 (aged 73)
- Place of death: Saronno, Italy
- Height: 1.76 m (5 ft 9 1/2 in)
- Position: Defender

Senior career*
Years	Team	Apps	(Gls)
1937–1939	Varese	54	(7)
1939–1943	Milano	96	(3)
1943–1945	Varese	24	(4)
1945–1947	Cremonese	64	(8)
1947–1950	Palermo	68	(9)
1950–1952	Juventus	12	(1)
1952–1954	Lucchese	53	(10)
- * Club domestic league appearances and goals

Enrico Boniforti (7 December 1917 – 18 November 1991) was an Italian professional football player.

Boniforti's older brother Arturo also played football professionally.
