= Jesse Carver =

English footballer (1911–2024)

- Carver with Newcastle United

Personal information
- Date of birth: 7 July 1911
- Place of birth: Liverpool, England
- Date of death: 29 November 2003 (aged 92)
- Place of death: Bournemouth, England
- Height: 5 ft 9 1/2 in (1.77 m)
- Position: Centre back

Senior career*
Years	Team	Apps	(Gls)
1929–1936	Blackburn Rovers	146	(0)
1936–1939	Newcastle United	70	(0)
Total		216	(0)

Managerial career
- 1946: Xerxes
- 1947–1948: Netherlands
- 1949–1951: Juventus
- 1952–1953: West Bromwich Albion
- 1953: Lazio
- 1953–1954: Torino
- 1954–1955: Roma
- 1955: Coventry City
- 1956–1957: Lazio
- 1957–1958: Inter Milan
- 1960: Genoa
- 1961: Lazio
- 1962–1963: APOEL
- 1969–1970: APOEL
- * Club domestic league appearances and goals

Jesse Carver (7 July 1911 – 29 November 2003) was an English football player and manager, best remembered for his management of some of Europe's finest clubs.

== Club career ==
Carver started out in football as a player, joining Blackburn Rovers as an 18-year-old groundstaff boy and spent seven years at Ewood Park, becoming the first choice centre-half in 1931, playing almost 150 games for the First Division side. Although under six foot and short for a stopper his strong tackling and intelligent reading of the game more than made up for his lack of inches. In 1936, he joined Newcastle United for £2,000, making his debut against Barnsley in August, and with Carver playing the Toon's highest finish was 4th in the Second Division. After playing 70 times in the league and six in the FA Cup between 1936 and 1939 for Newcastle United, Carver's playing career was cut short by the Second World War. During the war years, he worked as a policeman.

== Managerial career ==
After the war, Carver became an assistant trainer at Huddersfield, and he began to realise that he had more talent as a coach than as a player. He successfully applied to coach Dutch club Xerxes in Rotterdam. He built his training routines around using the ball, instead of boring repetitive lapping, Xerxes flourished, and heading the championship and he was asked to coach the national team, a position he held for two years.

After one season coaching at Millwall, he was appointed trainer to the England 'B' team on the successful 1949 tour of Holland and Finland. A job at the FA looked likely, but as the FA hesitated, Juventus jumped in and offered him the coach's job. He led Juve to the championship in his first season at the club.

Carver still wanted to prove himself in England, however, and in the summer of 1952, he was persuaded to return to coach West Brom. He had an immediate impact, with the team playing attacking football and up among the league leaders. Carver left late January 1954, as he wasn't appointed manager, despite his success, leaving the job to his assistant Vic Buckingham. Torino lured him back to Italy, and he ultimately saved the club from relegation.

He only stayed at Torino a year, before moving to Roma. His salary at Roma was £5,000; he and his wife had an apartment in the Via Archemedes, where his neighbours included ex-King Farouk and Ingrid Bergman. Several English First Division clubs coveted him, but in early 1955, Coventry City tempted him with a salary close to £100 per week (at a time when most players were earning £15). But perhaps the challenge at Coventry was more compelling, than the lure of the cheque book.

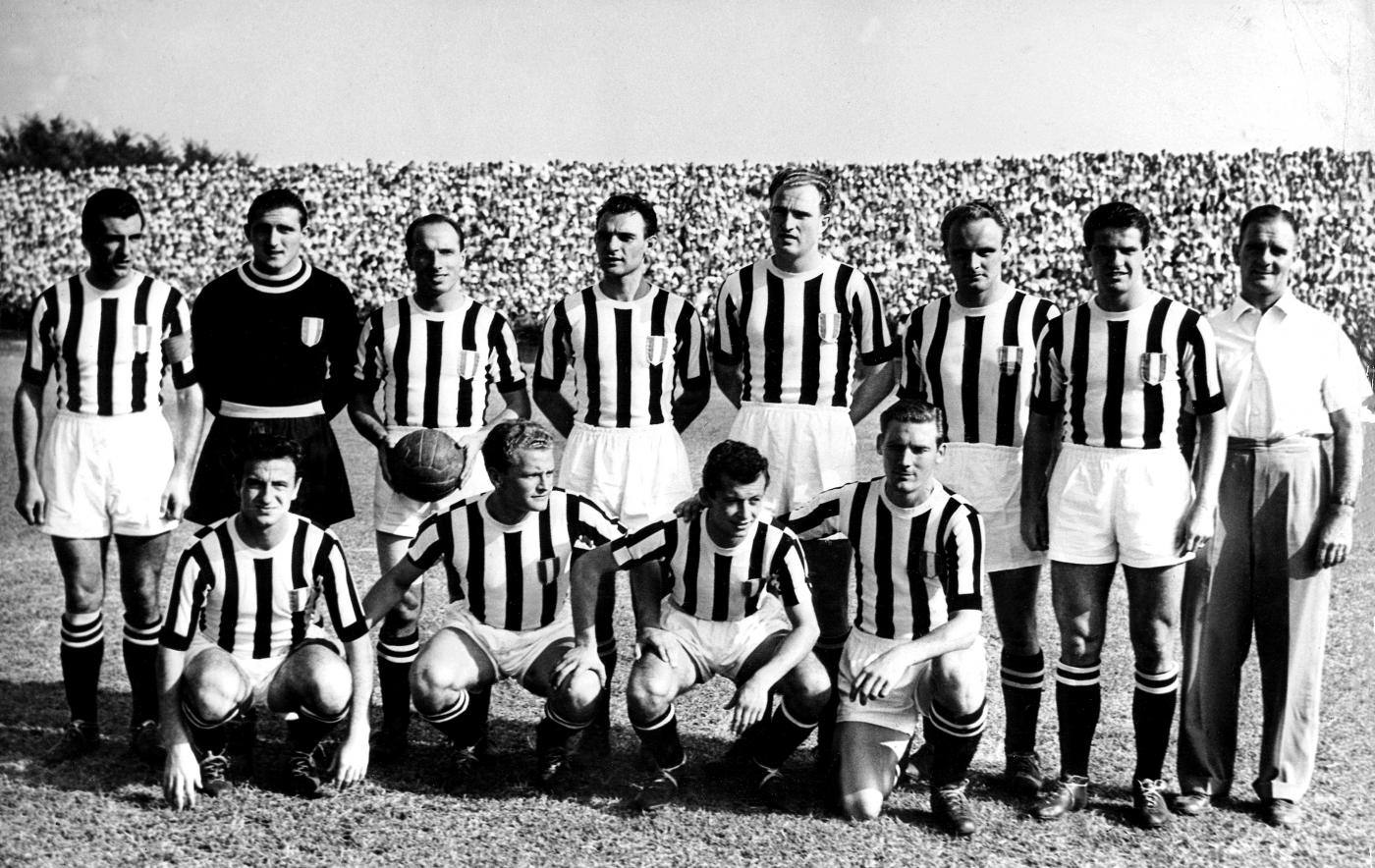
Carver (standing, first from right) as Juventus coach in the 1950–51 season

Football writer Brian Glanville who was close to Carver in Italy, revealed in recent years, that months after accepting the Coventry job, Carver was offered the England manager's job but turned it down because he had given his word to City chairman Erle Shanks. The FA were prepared to sack Walter Winterbottom to make the position his.

Carver arrived in Coventry with a tan that complemented his man-about-town personality, and with his tailored light grey suits and camel coat, he looked more like a Hollywood film mogul than a football manager. He warned supporters not too expect too much but his words went unheeded – promotion talk was, as always, in the air.

His innovations were far-reaching, from wooden shoes and bathrobes for the players to prevent them catching cold whilst getting out of the showers, to made-to-measure lightweight continental boots for all the players. He also bought 40 footballs, one for each player on the staff as he expected them to practice their ball skills at all times.

He also brought over from Italy former Swedish national coach George Raynor as his number two.

Over 24,000 fans were at the opening day win over Bournemouth, and the football was slick and exciting. At home, Carver's team were unbeatable, but away from home, they struggled for results and promotion hopes looked slim. Throughout the autumn, rumours persisted of a move back to Italy, but these were quashed by chairman Shanks.

By now, it had become apparent that Carver and Raynor's continental style was not quite enough to win promotion amidst the hurly-burly of the Third Division, and Carver re-shaped his approach. In December, he bought Ken McPherson from Middlesbrough, a big bustling centre-forward, and the team won five games on the trot, culminating in a 5–1 thrashing of Millwall in front of a crowd of 30,000.

But there was another major story brewing. Behind the scenes, Carver had made it clear to Shanks that he wanted to leave. The Midlands didn't suit his wife's health and he made an urgent request to be released from his three-year contract. The board reluctantly agreed and Carver left the club on New Year's Eve. City released him on the understanding that he didn't work in England during the remaining period of his Coventry contract. He denied that there were any other offers for his services; but within hours of him returning to Italy, on 3 January, Lazio announced he would be their new manager.

He led Lazio from 13th place to fourth place in the second half of the 1955–56 Serie A season. In 1956–57, he finished third.

He did return to a coaching job at Tottenham Hotspur in 1958, but failed to settle; later, he moved to Portugal. After a spell in the US, he retired to England in the 1970s.

He died on 29 November 2003, in Bournemouth.

== Honours ==
=== Manager ===
Juventus

- Serie A: 1949–50

== Bibliography ==
- Matthews, T. (2002). The Official Encyclopaedia of West Bromwich Albion. Britespot. ISBN 1-904103-16-2. p.149
- McOwan, G. (2002). The Essential History of West Bromwich Albion. Hodder. ISBN 0-7553-1146-9. pp62-3
