= Enore Boscolo =

Italian footballer (1929–2023)

Personal information
- Date of birth: 18 July 1929
- Place of birth: Udine, Italy
- Date of death: 14 April 2023 (aged 93)
- Height: 1.70 m (5 ft 7 in)
- Position: Midfielder

Senior career*
| Years | Team | Apps | (Gls) |
| 1946–1949 | Udinese | 35 | (8) |
| 1949–1953 | Triestina | 119 | (37) |
| 1953–1954 | Torino | 34 | (4) |
| 1954–1955 | Roma | 7 | (1) |
| 1955–1956 | L.R. Vicenza | 11 | (4) |
| 1956–1959 | Padova | 51 | (7) |
| 1959–1960 | Taranto | 8 | (0) |
- * Club domestic league appearances and goals

Enore Boscolo (Italian pronunciation: [ˈɛːnore ˈboskolo; ˈbɔs-]; 18 July 1929 – 14 April 2023) was an Italian professional footballer who played as a midfielder, spending ten seasons (220 games, 53 goals) in the Serie A for U.S. Triestina Calcio, A.C. Torino, A.S. Roma, Lanerossi Vicenza and Calcio Padova.
