= Cesarino Cervellati =

Italian footballer and manager (1930-2018)

Personal information
- Date of birth: 15 February 1930
- Place of birth: Baricella, Italy
- Date of death: 13 April 2018 (aged 88)
- Place of death: Pontecchio Marconi, Italy
- Position: Winger

Senior career*
Years	Team	Apps	(Gls)
1948–1962	Bologna	300	(88)

International career
1951–1961	Italy	6	(0)

Managerial career
- 1968–1969: Bologna
- 1972: Bologna
- 1977: Bologna
- 1979: Bologna
- 1983: Bologna
- * Club domestic league appearances and goals

Cesarino Cervellati (Italian pronunciation: [tʃezaˈriːno tʃervelˈlaːti]; 15 February 1930 – 13 April 2018) was an Italian footballer and manager from Baricella in the Province of Bologna, who played as a forward, usually as a right winger.

== Club career ==
Cervellati was a one club man in the truest sense of the term, spending fourteen seasons as a player at his home province side Bologna. He made his Serie A debut with the club on 21 November 1948, in an 8–2 away defeat to Lazio. Between 1948 and 1962, he scored 88 league goals for the team in 300 appearances, winning a Mitropa Cup title in 1961.

== International career ==
Cervellati represented Italy at international level on 6 occasions between 1951 and 1961; he made his debut on 6 May 1951, in a 0–0 home draw against Yugoslavia.

== After retirement ==
After retiring from the playing field, Cervellati was known to keep in touch with his roots at Bologna, going on to have five managerial spells at the club where he is considered in such high regard; he won a Serie A title with the club in 1964, serving as an assistant manager to Fulvio Bernardini.

== Honours ==
=== Player ===
Bologna

- Mitropa Cup: 1961

=== Assistant manager ===
- Serie A: 1963–64
