= Erling Sørensen =

Danish footballer and manager (1920–2002)

Personal information
- Full name: Erling Walther Sørensen
- Date of birth: 29 October 1920
- Place of birth: Copenhagen, Denmark
- Date of death: 10 October 2002 (aged 81)
- Positions: Inside right; left winger

Youth career
- 1933–1938: Boldklubben Frem

Senior career*
Years	Team	Apps	(Gls)
1939–1948	Frem	161	(82)
1948–1949	Strasbourg		
1949–1950	Modena	34	(15)
1950–1952	Udinese	68	(18)
1952–1955	Triestina	67	(15)

International career
1941–1948	Denmark	5	(2)

Managerial career
- 1963–1966: Frem
- Fremad Amager
- * Club domestic league appearances and goals

Erling Walther Sørensen (29 October 1920 – 10 October 2002) was a Danish amateur football player and club manager, who won a bronze medal with the Denmark national football team at the 1948 Summer Olympics. Sørensen played professionally in the Italian Serie A championship for six years, scoring 48 goals in 169 matches for Italian clubs Modena F.C., Udinese Calcio and U.S. Triestina.

Sørensen was known to have good a technique and a graceful style of playing, thus earning the nickname The Ballet Master. In his civil life, Sørensen worked as a city hall porter, tobacconist and hospital porter.

== Honours ==
Olympic medal record

Men's Football
Bronze medal – third place	1948 London	Team Competition

- Danish Football Championships: 1940-41 and 1943–44 with Frem
