= Enrique Martegani =

Argentine footballer

Personal information
- Date of birth: February 22, 1925
- Place of birth: Buenos Aires, Argentina
- Date of death: 20 October 2006 (aged 81)
- Place of death: Buenos Aires, Argentina
- Positions: Midfielder; striker
1944–1945	Chacarita Juniors	11	(3)
1945–1947	Boca Juniors	11	(3)
1947–1948	Estudiantes	5	(0)
1948	Chacarita Juniors	21	(7)
1948–1950	All Boys	19	(11)
1950–1952	Padova	63	(23)
1952–1955	Palermo	93	(21)
1955–1956	Lazio	9	(0)

Enrique Andrés Martegani (22 February 1925 – 20 October 2006) was an Argentine footballer who spent the vast majority of his career between Argentina and Italy.

A midfielder and striker, he played for several Argentine teams and in the Italian Serie A with the shirts of Padova, Palermo and Lazio.

A 1955 play, La padrona di Raggio di Luna, was based on Martegani's 1952 transfer to Palermo.
