= Karl Aage Hansen =

Danish footballer (1921-1990)

Karl Hansen
Personal information
- Full name: Karl Aage Hansen
- Date of birth: 4 July 1921
- Place of birth: Mesinge, Denmark
- Date of death: 23 November 1990 (aged 69)
- Position: Inside forward

Senior career*
Years	Team	Apps	(Gls)
19??–1940	KFUM Boldklub	?	(?)
1941–1948	Akademisk Boldklub	?	(?)
1948–1949	Huddersfield Town	15	(3)
1949–1950	Atalanta	37	(18)
1950–1953	Juventus	86	(37)
1953–1954	Sampdoria	29	(3)
1954–1957	Catania	79	(7)

International career
1943–1948	Denmark	22	(17)

Managerial career
- 1970: Akademisk Boldklub
- 1972: Akademisk Boldklub
- * Club domestic league appearances and goals

Olympic medal record

Men's Football
Bronze medal – third place	1948 London	Team competition

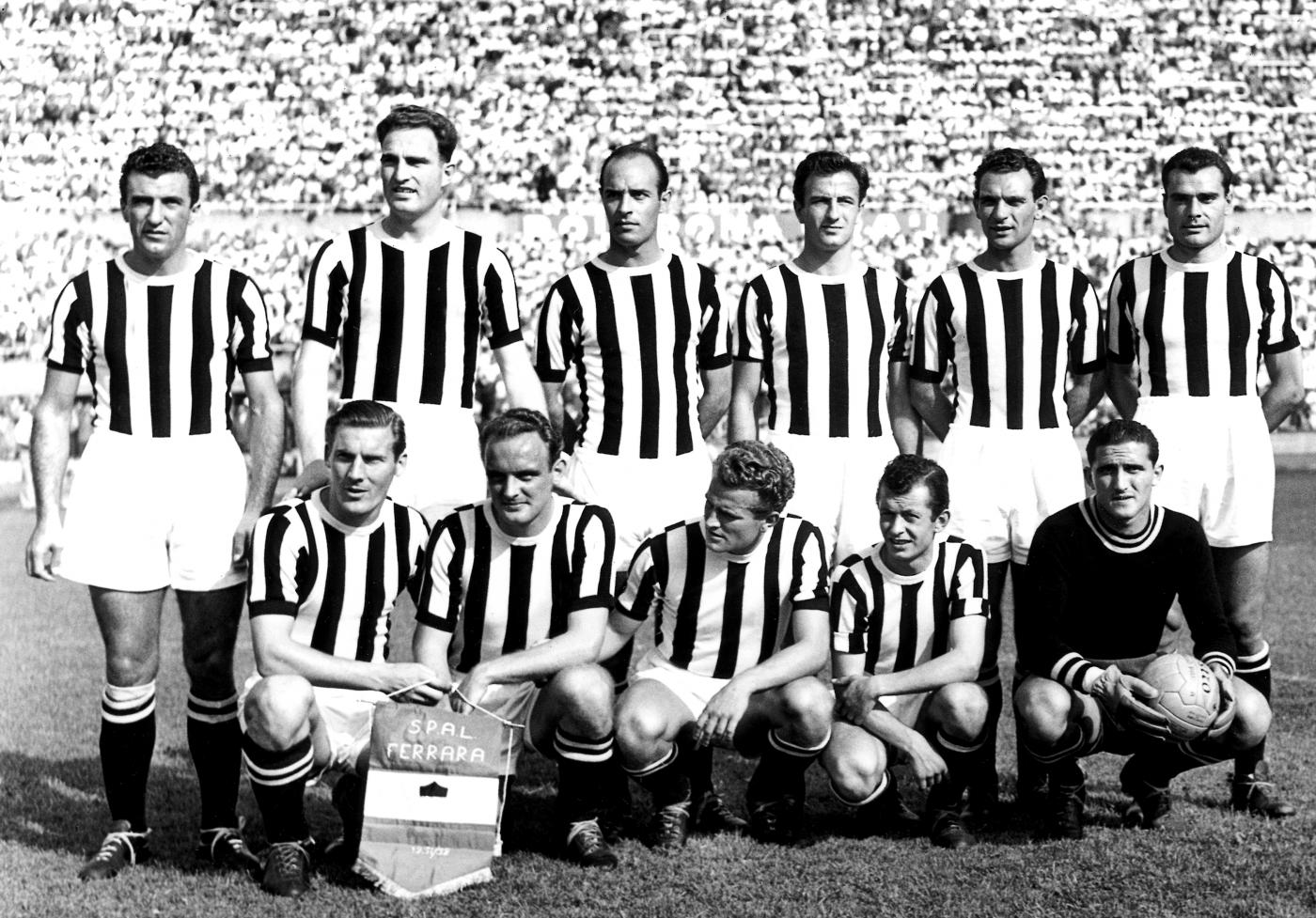
Turin (Italy), Communal Stadium, September 9, 1951. The line-up of Juventus FC took to the pitch prior the home tie versus SPAL (1-1), Matchday 1 of the Italian League 1951–52 Serie A. From left to right, standing: C. Parola (captain), J. Hansen, A. Piccinini, G. Mari, S. Manente, E. Boniforti; crouched: K. A. Præst, K. A. Hansen, G. Boniperti, E. Muccinelli, G. Viola.

Karl Aage Hansen (4 July 1921 – 23 November 1990) was a Danish football player, who played as a forward. He won a bronze medal with the Denmark national football team at the 1948 Summer Olympics in London. He scored 17 goals in 22 games for the Danish national team, and was Danish team captain on 17 occasions. He got his breakthrough as an amateur player in Danish club Akademisk Boldklub, but moved abroad in 1948 to play professionally for a number of European clubs, including Juventus FC and UC Sampdoria in Italy and Huddersfield Town in England.

== Career ==
=== Amateur years ===
Karl Aage Hansen had a strong physique, and was a good dribbler with excellent technique, who played in the inside forward position. He had a lax approach to training, but kept in shape through team handball, decathlon, and doing gymnastics. He played handball for KFUM Handball and football for KFUM Boldklub. When he moved from KFUM Boldklub to play football for Akademisk Boldklub (AB), he moved from KFUM Handball to HG Handball, where most of his AB teammates played. Hansen won the Danish handball championship with HG and represented the Denmark men's national handball team.

Hansen's preferred sport was football, and his move to top club AB was motivated by a greater possibility to get selected for the Denmark national football team. Hansen made his international debut on 20 June 1943, as Denmark won 3–2 against the Sweden men's national football team, the last international game during the German occupation of Denmark. With AB, Hansen won the Danish championship three times, namely in the 1942–43 and 1944–45 Danish War Tournaments, as well as the 1946–47 Danish 1st Division. He was called up to the first Danish national team assembled after the Second World War in June 1945, and only missed a single of Denmark's next 15 games until June 1947. In these 14 games, Hansen scored 13 goals and was likewise named team captain in 13 games.

In the run-up to the 1948 Summer Olympics in London, Hansen missed a few international games due to injury. He returned to the final warm-up game, scoring two goals as Denmark beat the Poland national football team 8–0. Hansen was considered the most important player of the Olympic team, with his leadership skills, great work rate, creative passing, and ability to score goals. In the first game of the Olympic tournament against the Egypt national football team, Hansen scored two goals, including a goal from a solo dribble from inside the Danish half, and was credited for securing Denmark the 3–1 victory in extra time. Having captained Denmark to a 5–3 win against the Italy national football team in the quarter-final, Hansen's injury reappeared during the semi-final against Sweden. As no substitutions were allowed, Denmark played on with the hampered Hansen, and lost the game 2–4. Without Hansen, but with 11 fit players, Denmark won the bronze medal game 5–3 against the Great Britain national football team. Following the competition, Karl Aage Hansen and Carl Aage Præst were selected as Denmark's top performers at the tournament. Karl Aage Hansen only played two additional international games for Denmark, before he signed a professional contract, and was banned from the amateur-only national team selection.

=== Professional career ===
Hansen's first year abroad was spent at Huddersfield Town, which narrowly avoided relegation from the top-flight 1948–49 Football League First Division. In 1949, Hansen moved to Italy to play for Atalanta Bergamo, and received a transfer fee of approximately DKK150,000. At Atalanta, he played alongside fellow Danish Olympic footballer Jørgen Leschly Sørensen. Hansen scored 18 goals in 37 games, as Atalanta finished in eight place of the 1949–50 Serie A season.

For the next season, Hansen moved on to defending Serie A champions Juventus FC, where he was to play alongside fellow Danish Olympians John Hansen and Carl Aage Præst. As a part of his contract, Karl Aage demanded a clause to let him change clubs on a free transfer. The three Danes had a great understanding on the pitch. In his first season at Juventus, Karl Aage Hansen scored 23 goals in 34 games, making him the joint third highest goal scorer of the season. During the 1951–52 Serie A season, Karl Aage scored only 12 goals, but in his stead John Hansen stepped up, and became league top goal scorer, as Juventus won the Serie A championship. Karl Aage Hansen played an additional season with Juventus, before leaving the club on a free transfer in 1953. The Juventus leaders thought Karl Aage Hansen over the hill, and would not offer him a satisfactory contract. He played 87 games and scored 37 goals in the Serie A for Juventus.

Karl Aage Hansen had not liked being in Juventus as much as his time in Atalanta, and looked forward to move on. In the end, he chose Serie A rivals Sampdoria Genoa as his new club, and got the transfer sum himself. He stayed a single season with Sampdoria, helping the club finish 8th in the 1953–54 Serie A season, before making yet another lucrative move to the young Serie A team Catania Calcio in 1954. Hansen spent three seasons with Catania, even following the club into the Serie B, when the team was relegated due to match fixing in 1955. He played a total 79 games and scored seven goals for Catania. In 1957, Hansen's professional career was over, and he returned to Denmark. He is estimated to be the member of the Danish 1948 Olympics team who made the most money from his professional career, due to his many lucrative free transfer moves, each time earning the entire transfer fee for himself.
