= Ermes Muccinelli =

Italian footballer (1927–1994)

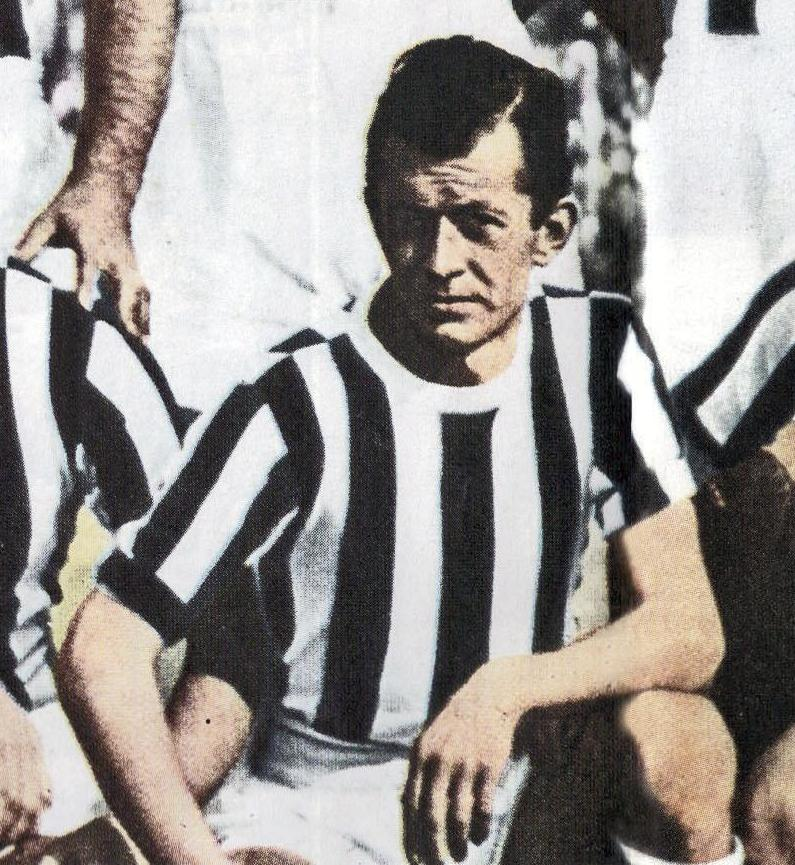
- Muccinelli with Juventus in the 1951–52 season

Personal information
- Full name: Ermes Muccinelli
- Date of birth: 28 July 1927
- Place of birth: Lugo di Romagna, Italy
- Date of death: 4 November 1994 (aged 67)
- Place of death: Savona, Italy
- Position: Forward

Senior career*
Years	Team	Apps	(Gls)
1945–1946	Biellese	?	(?)
1946–1955	Juventus	226	(69)
1955–1958	Lazio	93	(20)
1958–1959	Juventus	15	(0)
1960–1961	Como	3	(0)
Total		334 + ?	(89 + ?)

International career
1950–1957	Italy	15	(4)
- * Club domestic league appearances and goals

Ermes Muccinelli (Italian pronunciation: [ˈɛrmez muttʃiˈnɛlli]; 28 July 1927 – 4 November 1994) was an Italian footballer who played as a forward, mainly as a winger.

== Club career ==
Muccinelli was born in Lugo di Romagna, in the province of Ravenna. During his career he played for Juventus FC (1946–1957 and 1959) and S.S. Lazio (1957–1958), winning two Scudettos (1950, 1952) and one Coppa Italia (1958).

== International career ==
Muccinelli also played 15 matches and scored 4 goals for the Italy national team between 1950 and 1957, and took part in two World Cups (1950 and 1954).

== Death ==
Muccinelli died in Savona in 1994.
