= 1951–52 Serie A =

49th season of top-tier Italian football

Serie A
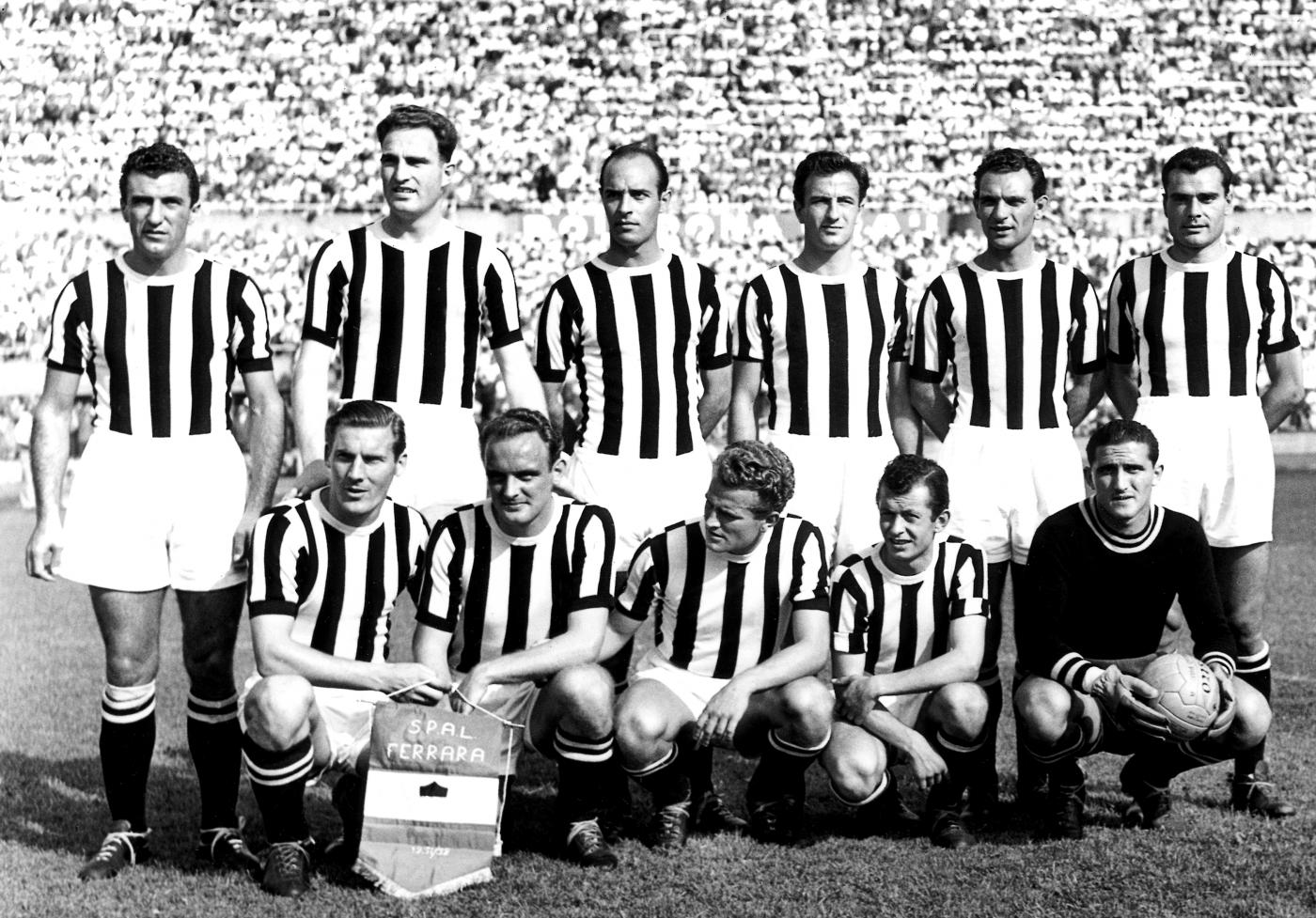
- 1951–52 Serie A winning Juventus squad
- Season: 1951–52
- Champions: Juventus; 9th title
- Relegated: Lucchese; Padova; Legnano
- Matches: 380
- Goals: 1,101 (2.9 per match)
- Top goalscorer: John Hansen (30 goals)

The 1951-52 Serie A was the fiftieth edition of the Italian Football Championship. It was the nineteenth Italian Football Championship branded Serie A, since Serie A was launched in 1929. This was the twenty-sixth season from which the Italian Football Champions adorned their team jerseys in the subsequent season with a Scudetto. Juventus were champions for the ninth time in their history. This was their eighth scudetto since the scudetto started being awarded in 1924 and their seventh win contested as Serie A.

== Teams ==
SPAL and Legnano had been promoted from Serie B.

Six out of the twenty clubs came from Lombardy, a record for a single region of Italy.

Serie A 1951-52 team distribution

== Events ==
FIGC decided to restore the original 18-clubs format, so a special relegation would have been necessary.

== Final classification ==
Pos	Team	Pld	W	D	L	GF	GA	GD	Pts	Qualification or relegation
1	Juventus (C)	38	26	8	4	98	34	+64	60	1952 Latin Cup
2	Milan	38	20	13	5	87	41	+46	53	
3	Internazionale	38	21	7	10	86	49	+37	49	
4	Fiorentina	38	17	9	12	52	38	+14	43	
4	Lazio	38	15	13	10	60	49	+11	43	
6	Napoli	38	17	8	13	64	44	+20	42	
7	Sampdoria	38	16	9	13	48	40	+8	41	
8	Novara	38	16	8	14	62	62	0	40	
9	SPAL	38	12	13	13	52	50	+2	37	
9	Pro Patria	38	12	13	13	47	62	−15	37	
11	Palermo	38	11	14	13	43	51	−8	36	
12	Atalanta	38	13	8	17	54	61	−7	34	
12	Como	38	15	4	19	53	70	−17	34	
12	Udinese	38	11	12	15	43	62	−19	34	
12	Torino	38	12	10	16	39	58	−19	34	
16	Bologna	38	11	11	16	45	55	−10	33	
17	Triestina	38	11	10	17	47	68	−21	32	Qualification play-offs
18	Lucchese (R)	38	11	10	17	39	49	−10	32	Serie B after tie-breaker
19	Padova (R)	38	10	9	19	45	73	−28	29	Relegation to Serie B
20	Legnano (R)	38	4	9	25	37	85	−48	17	Relegation to Serie B

Source: Panini
(C) Champions; (R) Relegated

== Results ==
Home \ Away	ATA	BOL	COM	FIO	INT	JUV	LAZ	LEG	LUC	MIL	NAP	NOV	PAD	PAL	PPA	SAM	SPA	TOR	TRI	UDI
Atalanta		1–2	1–0	1–0	0–2	0–1	0–2	2–0	1–2	1–0	2–4	2–0	1–1	2–2	1–1	2–1	1–0	5–0	7–1	3–0
Bologna	1–0		4–2	0–3	3–4	2–3	2–4	1–0	2–1	0–0	1–4	4–1	2–1	0–0	1–1	0–0	1–1	0–0	2–1	2–0
Como	2–1	1–0		0–2	2–1	2–0	2–2	3–0	1–1	1–2	2–4	2–2	3–2	4–0	0–1	2–1	1–3	1–0	2–0	5–0
Fiorentina	0–1	1–0	5–0		5–0	0–2	0–0	1–0	1–0	1–0	2–1	1–1	3–1	2–1	3–0	0–1	0–0	1–0	2–1	3–3
Internazionale	4–0	2–2	5–1	0–0		3–2	1–1	3–1	4–3	2–2	3–0	3–1	4–0	5–0	3–0	0–1	1–0	2–0	5–1	1–1
Juventus	7–1	1–1	0–0	4–0	3–2		5–3	6–1	2–0	3–1	1–1	3–1	3–0	4–0	5–1	2–1	1–1	6–0	2–1	5–1
Lazio	1–2	1–0	1–2	1–0	1–2	2–0		2–0	3–0	1–1	1–0	1–0	5–0	1–1	2–1	0–0	4–1	3–0	4–1	3–1
Legnano	2–2	0–2	1–2	1–0	0–4	0–3	1–1		0–2	2–1	2–4	2–3	2–2	1–1	1–2	1–2	3–3	2–2	1–3	0–0
Lucchese	2–0	0–0	1–2	0–0	1–0	0–0	4–0	4–2		0–5	0–0	1–1	0–1	1–0	2–0	1–1	2–0	3–0	1–2	1–1
Milan	4–4	4–0	2–0	3–1	2–1	1–1	1–1	4–1	4–0		3–2	6–2	3–0	4–0	5–1	2–1	1–1	4–1	2–0	0–0
Napoli	3–1	1–1	7–1	2–1	1–0	1–2	2–1	2–3	2–0	0–2		0–1	2–0	1–2	4–1	1–0	2–1	4–0	0–0	1–2
Novara	2–0	1–0	3–2	4–3	2–4	1–4	2–2	4–1	1–0	1–2	1–0		2–1	1–1	3–0	2–1	2–2	2–1	5–0	4–1
Padova	1–1	2–1	0–2	1–1	1–5	1–2	2–1	2–1	0–1	5–2	0–1	0–0		3–2	1–0	2–1	2–4	3–0	0–0	2–1
Palermo	0–1	1–1	4–1	2–0	1–1	0–0	0–0	2–0	3–1	1–1	1–1	3–1	4–1		1–2	0–0	3–0	0–2	1–0	2–1
Pro Patria	1–1	2–0	1–0	1–1	5–1	1–3	4–2	1–1	2–1	2–2	1–1	1–0	2–2	0–0		3–2	2–2	1–1	2–2	1–0
Sampdoria	3–2	2–1	3–1	1–1	1–3	2–1	4–0	3–0	1–1	1–1	2–1	3–1	1–1	1–1	1–0		0–1	1–0	3–1	1–0
SPAL	2–1	2–1	1–0	1–2	1–1	0–1	4–0	3–1	1–0	1–2	2–1	2–1	1–1	3–0	2–2	0–1		1–1	1–1	2–3
Torino	1–1	3–2	4–0	2–0	1–0	0–0	1–1	0–1	1–1	0–6	0–2	0–1	4–1	2–0	2–0	2–0	1–0		5–2	0–0
Triestina	3–1	4–1	2–0	2–3	1–3	0–3	1–1	1–1	3–1	1–1	0–0	2–2	2–1	2–0	3–0	1–0	2–1	0–1		0–0
Udinese	3–1	0–2	3–1	0–3	2–1	2–7	1–1	2–1	2–0	1–1	1–1	1–0	3–1	0–3	0–1	2–0	1–1	1–1	3–0	

Source: Almanacco Illustrato del Calcio - La Storia 1898-2004, Panini Edizioni, Modena, September 2005 (in Italian)
Legend: Blue = home team win; Yellow = draw; Red = away team win.

== Relegation tie-breaker ==
The 3 last-placed teams in Serie A were guaranteed relegation. However, due to a tie for 17th place between Lucchese and Triestina, the teams had to play a tie-breaker to determine which team would be relegated and which team qualified for the playoff.

Game played in Bergamo

Team 1	Score	Team 2
Triestina (Italy)	3-3	(Italy) Lucchese

The match was null.

Game played in Milan

Team 1	Score	Team 2
Triestina (Italy)	1-0	(Italy) Lucchese

Lucchese was relegated and Triestina qualified for the playoff game against Brescia, Serie B's 2nd-placed team.

== Serie A qualification play-off ==
Since it was decided to reduce the number of Serie A teams from 20 to 18 for the 1952–1953 season, only the top 16 teams in Serie A were guaranteed to remain there the following season, and only the first-placed team in Serie B was guaranteed a direct promotion to Serie A. The 18th team would be decided in a one-game playoff between the 17th-placed team in Serie A and the 2nd-placed team in Serie B.

Game played in Valdagno

Team 1	Score	Team 2
Brescia (Italy)	0-1	(Italy) Triestina

Triestina maintained its place in Serie A. Lucchese, Padova and Legnano were relegated while only Roma, the Serie B champion, was promoted.

== Top goalscorers ==
Rank	Player	Club	Goals
1	(Denmark) John Hansen	Juventus	30
2	(Sweden) Gunnar Nordahl	Milan	27
3	(Hungarian People's Republic) István Nyers	Internazionale	23
4	(Italy) Renzo Burini	Milan	22
4	(Sweden) Hasse Jeppson	Atalanta	22
6	(Italy) Giampiero Boniperti	Juventus	19
7	(Italy) Silvio Piola	Novara	18
8	(Italy) Ermes Muccinelli	Juventus	17
9	(Turkey) Şükrü Gülesin	Lazio	16
10	(Italy) Benito Lorenzi	Internazionale	15
11	(Italy) Cesarino Cervellati	Bologna	14
12	(Turkey) Aziz Esel Bulent	SPAL	13
12	(Italy) Mario Astorri	Napoli	13
12	(Italy) Giuseppe Baldini	Como	13
12	(Italy) Giuseppe Rinaldi	Udinese	13
16	(Denmark) Karl Aage Hansen	Juventus	12
16	(Italy) Pasquale Vivolo	Juventus	12
16	(Italy) Gino Armano	Internazionale	12
16	(Italy) Pietro Broccini	Internazionale	12
16	(Italy) Amedeo Amadei	Napoli	12
16	(Argentina) Enrique Andres Martegani	Padova	12
16	(Italy) Adriano Bassetto	Sampdoria	12

== References and sources ==
- Almanacco Illustrato del Calcio - La Storia 1898-2004, Panini Edizioni, Modena, September 2005
