= 1949–50 Serie A =

47th season of top-tier Italian football

Serie A
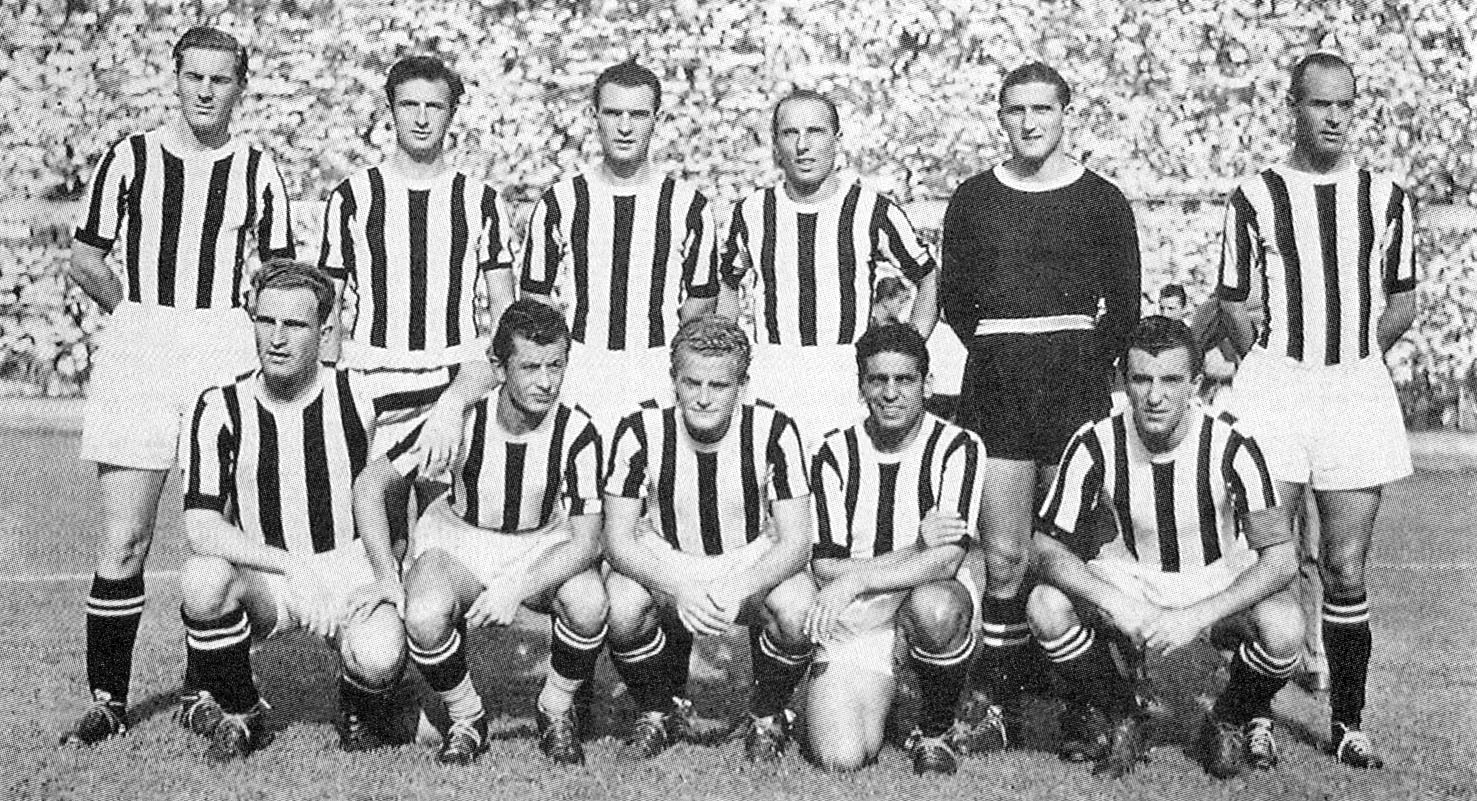
- 1949–50 Juventus team
- Season: 1949–50
- Champions: Juventus; 8th title
- Relegated: Bari; Venezia
- Matches: 380
- Goals: 1,265 (3.33 per match)
- Top goalscorer: Gunnar Nordahl (35 goals)

The 1949–50 Serie A was the forty-eighth edition of the Italian Football Championship. It was the seventeenth Italian Football Championship branded Serie A, since Serie A was launched in 1929. This was the twenty-fourth season from which the Italian Football Champions adorned their team jerseys in the subsequent season with a Scudetto. Juventus were champions for the eighth time in their history. This was their seventh scudetto since the scudetto started being awarded in 1924 and their sixth win contested as Serie A. This ended their rivals Torino's run of five consecutive Italian Football Championship wins, after the Torino first team squad was killed in the Superga air disaster.

== Teams ==
Como and Venezia had been promoted from Serie B.

Serie A 1949-50 team distribution

== Final classification ==
Pos	Team	Pld	W	D	L	GF	GA	GD	Pts	Qualification or relegation
1	Juventus (C)	38	28	6	4	100	43	+57	62	
2	Milan	38	27	3	8	118	45	+73	57	
3	Internazionale	38	21	7	10	99	60	+39	49	
4	Lazio	38	18	10	10	67	43	+24	46	Qualified for the 1950 Latin Cup
5	Fiorentina	38	18	8	12	76	57	+19	44	
6	Torino	38	17	7	14	80	76	+4	41	
6	Como	38	15	11	12	59	59	0	41	
8	Atalanta	38	17	6	15	66	60	+6	40	
8	Triestina	38	14	12	12	50	59	−9	40	
10	Padova	38	13	9	16	61	65	−4	35	
11	Pro Patria	38	11	12	15	50	61	−11	34	
11	Genoa	38	13	8	17	45	64	−19	34	
13	Sampdoria	38	13	7	18	62	70	−8	33	
13	Palermo	38	13	7	18	47	64	−17	33	
15	Bologna	38	8	16	14	54	63	−9	32	
15	Lucchese	38	11	10	17	65	79	−14	32	
17	Novara	38	11	9	18	51	64	−13	31	
17	Roma	38	12	7	19	52	70	−18	31	
19	Bari (R)	38	11	7	20	38	74	−36	29	Relegation to Serie B
20	Venezia (R)	38	5	6	27	25	89	−64	16	Relegation to Serie B

Source: Panini
(C) Champions; (R) Relegated

== Results ==
Home \ Away	ATA	BAR	BOL	COM	FIO	GEN	INT	JUV	LAZ	LUC	MIL	NOV	PAD	PAL	PPA	ROM	SAM	TOR	TRI	VEN
Atalanta		2–1	1–1	0–2	3–2	4–0	2–1	2–2	1–0	1–1	5–2	0–2	4–0	3–0	2–1	3–2	3–1	0–0	0–1	3–1
Bari	1–0		3–2	1–0	1–0	2–0	2–3	0–0	2–1	2–1	2–0	0–0	1–0	1–2	1–1	1–1	3–1	1–5	1–1	4–0
Bologna	2–6	2–0		2–2	2–1	0–0	2–3	0–4	0–0	1–1	0–1	1–1	0–0	1–1	3–1	2–1	1–0	5–2	1–1	6–1
Como	4–0	4–1	2–2		4–1	0–0	1–5	2–6	1–0	4–0	1–4	2–2	1–2	1–0	1–0	0–0	3–1	1–3	3–1	0–0
Fiorentina	2–1	3–0	3–0	0–1		3–1	4–2	0–0	2–2	2–0	1–3	5–0	3–0	0–0	4–1	4–1	4–1	4–1	2–1	5–0
Genoa	1–0	1–0	2–2	3–1	2–0		1–1	1–2	2–1	1–1	1–0	2–0	0–1	1–0	2–1	2–1	0–1	3–2	6–2	1–0
Internazionale	3–1	4–0	2–1	1–2	4–2	4–2		2–4	2–1	6–3	6–5	1–1	1–1	1–1	2–0	3–1	2–0	2–0	6–1	7–0
Juventus	2–0	4–0	3–2	2–2	5–2	6–1	3–2		1–2	1–2	1–7	1–1	4–0	6–2	3–1	3–0	1–0	4–3	3–0	1–0
Lazio	1–1	4–2	3–2	3–2	1–1	1–0	3–2	1–3		4–2	3–2	4–0	4–0	5–0	1–0	3–1	1–0	2–2	2–0	2–0
Lucchese	4–2	3–0	1–1	3–1	1–3	2–2	0–5	1–2	2–2		0–2	2–1	6–3	2–1	1–3	3–1	3–0	2–2	7–2	2–0
Milan	2–1	9–1	2–0	1–1	4–1	5–0	3–1	0–1	0–0	2–0		5–0	4–2	4–1	7–1	6–2	5–1	7–0	5–2	2–0
Novara	5–2	0–0	1–2	1–1	3–0	2–1	0–0	2–3	0–1	5–0	1–3		1–1	2–1	3–2	0–2	1–2	5–2	1–2	5–1
Padova	2–0	3–1	0–0	5–2	3–4	2–2	2–2	0–2	2–1	3–2	1–2	0–1		2–1	1–1	4–1	1–2	4–1	0–1	3–0
Palermo	3–2	2–0	2–1	3–2	0–1	3–2	4–2	0–0	2–1	1–1	0–1	3–1	3–0		0–0	3–0	2–3	2–1	0–2	1–0
Pro Patria	1–2	2–1	3–3	0–0	3–0	2–0	0–3	0–3	1–0	2–2	2–4	1–0	2–1	2–0		2–1	1–1	6–1	0–0	1–0
Roma	1–3	6–0	3–1	0–1	1–1	3–0	1–3	1–0	0–0	2–2	1–0	2–1	0–1	2–1	2–0		2–1	3–1	0–0	3–2
Sampdoria	2–2	3–0	2–1	0–1	1–1	1–1	0–2	0–4	2–5	3–1	1–3	3–0	1–1	4–0	3–3	4–1		4–0	3–1	0–0
Torino	3–1	1–1	3–1	4–0	2–2	2–0	1–0	1–3	2–2	3–1	3–2	5–1	2–0	5–1	1–1	5–0	4–1		3–1	3–0
Triestina	0–1	1–0	0–0	1–1	1–1	3–0	4–2	2–3	0–0	2–0	0–0	1–0	2–2	1–0	2–2	2–2	3–2	3–0		2–0
Venezia	1–2	2–1	1–1	1–2	1–2	3–1	1–1	1–4	1–0	1–0	1–4	0–1	0–8	1–1	0–0	2–1	3–7	0–1	0–1	

Source: Almanacco Illustrato del Calcio - La Storia 1898-2004, Panini Edizioni, Modena, September 2005 (in Italian)
Legend: Blue = home team win; Yellow = draw; Red = away team win.

== Top goalscorers ==
Rank	Player	Club	Goals
1	(Sweden) Gunnar Nordahl	Milan	35
2	(Hungarian People's Republic) István Nyers	Internazionale	30
3	(Denmark) John Hansen	Juventus	28
4	(Argentina) Benjamin Santos	Torino	27
5	(Italy) Alberto Galassi	Fiorentina	23
6	(Italy) Renzo Burini	Milan	22
7	(Italy) Giampiero Boniperti	Juventus	20
7	(Italy) Amedeo Amadei	Internazionale	20
9	(Italy) Giancarlo Vitali	Padova	19
9	(Hungarian People's Republic) Mihály Kincses	Lucchese	19
11	(Sweden) Gunnar Gren	Milan	18
11	(Sweden) Nils Liedholm	Milan	18
11	(Denmark) Karl Aage Hansen	Atalanta	18
11	(Italy) Vittorio Ghiandi	Como	18
11	(Argentina) (Italy) Rinaldo Martino	Juventus	18
11	(Italy) Adriano Bassetto	Sampdoria	18
17	(Denmark) Jørgen Leschly Sørensen	Atalanta	17
18	(Netherlands) Faas Wilkes	Internazionale	16

== References and sources ==
- Almanacco Illustrato del Calcio - La Storia 1898-2004, Panini Edizioni, Modena, September 2005
