= 1950–51 AC Milan season =

Associazione Calcio Milan
1950–51 season
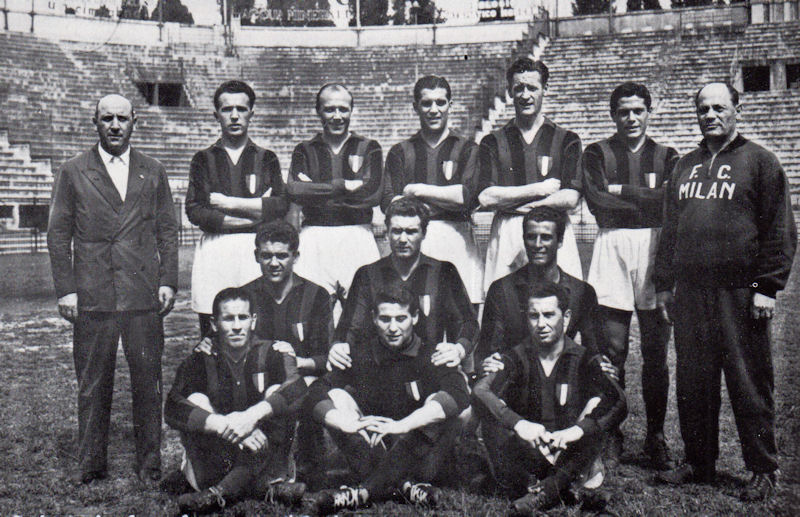
- A.C. Milan celebrating their title win
- Chairman: Umberto Trabattoni
- Manager: Lajos Czeizler; Antonio Busini (as technical director)
- Stadium: San Siro
- Serie A: 1st (in Latin Cup)
- Latin Cup: Winners
- Top goalscorer: League: Nordahl (34); All: Nordahl (38)
Home colours	Away colours

During 1950–51 season Associazione Calcio Milan competed in Serie A and Latin Cup.

== Summary ==
In season 1950-1951 Milan conquered the title of Italian champion (from 1925 also known as scudetto) after 44 years. In effective number of championships were 36 due to 1908 season the club not playing in, and suspended seasons during World Wars (1915-1919 and 1943–1945). The rossoneri did not win any trophy since 1918: Coppa Mauro (a non-competitive Inter-War tournament) that means a long period of 33 years. This league was the first title since 1929–1930 season when it was introduced the sole group competition format.

Crucial to clinch this trophy was the three Swedish players known as Gre-No-Li introduced to the calcio last season. Also important were the captain Andrea Bonomi, goalkeeper Lorenzo Buffon, Arturo Silvestri (arrived in the summer from Modena), Carlo Annovazzi, Omero Tognon, Benigno De Grandi, Renzo Burini and Mario Renosto. The manager was Lajos Czeizler supported by technical director Antonio Busini. The team started the tournament with 6 wins in a row. The rossoneri competed hardly against Juventus and Inter (Neroazzurri defeated the club the first derby of the season ) in an incredible offensive season where Milan, Juventus and Inter scored more than 100 goals the rossoneri finally won the championship thanks to lost only 4 games.

Also, in June 1951 the club won the Latin Cup, the most important competition in Europe. In semifinals the Diavoli won 4–1 against Atlético Madrid thanks to a hat-trick of Renosto and 1 goal of Nordahl. In Final against Lille the team won 5–0 with a hat-trick of Nordahl included and two goals of Burini and Annovazzi. Milan won its first international trophy.

== Squad ==
Note: Flags indicate national team as defined under FIFA eligibility rules; some limited exceptions apply. Players may hold more than one non-FIFA nationality.

Pos.	Nation	Player
GK	ITA	Lorenzo Buffon
GK	ITA	Giovanni Rossetti
DF	ITA	Carlo Belloni
DF	ITA	Andrea Bonomi (Captain)
DF	ITA	Mario Foglia
DF	ITA	Arturo Silvestri
MF	ITA	Carlo Annovazzi (vice-Captain)
MF	ITA	Luciano Carnier
MF	ITA	Benigno De Grandi

Pos.	Nation	Player
MF	SWE	Nils Liedholm
MF	ITA	Omero Tognon
FW	ITA	Renzo Burini
FW	SWE	Gunnar Gren
FW	SWE	Gunnar Nordahl
FW	ITA	Mario Renosto
FW	ITA	Aurelio Santagostino
FW	ITA	Albano Vicariotto

=== Transfers ===
In
Pos.	Name	from	Type
DF	Luciano Carnier	Portogruarese	-
MF	Giovanni Mangini	Spezia	-
FW	Mario Renosto	Venezia	-
DF	Arturo Silvestri	Modena	-
FW	Albano Vicariotto	Vicenza	-

Out
Pos.	Name	To	Type
MF	Luigi Angelini	Reggiana	-
DF	Pietro Bettoli	Messina	-
FW	Adelchi Brach	Messina	-
FW	Enrico Candiani	Pro Patria	-
FW	Fabio Frugali	Spezia	-
GK	Efrem Milanese	Venezia	-
FW	Giuseppe Rinaldi	Udinese	-
DF	Fulvio Zonch	Messina	-

== Competitions ==
=== Serie A ===
==== League table ====
Pos	Team	Pld	W	D	L	GF	GA	GD	Pts	Qualification or relegation
1	Milan (C)	38	26	8	4	107	39	+68	60	1951 Latin Cup
2	Internazionale	38	27	5	6	107	43	+64	59	
3	Juventus	38	23	8	7	103	44	+59	54	
4	Lazio	38	18	10	10	64	50	+14	46	
5	Fiorentina	38	18	8	12	52	42	+10	44	

Source: Panini
(C) Champions

==== Results by round ====
Round	1	2	3	4	5	6	7	8	9	10	11	12	13	14	15	16	17	18	19	20	21	22	23	24	25	26	27	28	29	30	31	32	33	34	35	36	37	38
Ground	A	A	H	A	H	H	A	H	A	H	A	H	A	A	H	H	A	H	H	A	H	H	A	H	A	A	H	A	H	A	H	A	H	H	A	A	H	A
Result	W	W	W	W	W	W	D	W	D	L	W	L	W	W	W	W	W	D	W	D	W	W	W	W	W	W	W	W	W	W	D	W	W	D	D	D	L	L
Position	1	1	1	1	1	1	1	1	1	3	2	3	2	2	2	2	2	2	2	2	1	1	1	1	1	1	1	1	1	1	1	1	1	1	1	1	1	1

Source: http://calcio-seriea.net/allenatori_squadra/1948/277/
A = Away; H = Home; W = Win; D = Draw; L = Loss; = Leader, 1951 Latin Cup; = Relegation to 1951–52 Serie B

==== Matches ====
10 September 1950 1	Milan	6–2	Udinese	Milan
	Liedholm 5'; Annovazzi 10'; Santagostino 29', 42'; Renosto 66'; Nordahl 74'	Report	18' Perissinotto; 60' Rinaldi	Stadium: San Siro; Attendance: 40 000; Referee: Aldo Cartei

17 September 1950 2	Sampdoria	1–2	Milan	Genoa
	Gei 26'	Report	31' Annovazzi; 72' Nordahl	Stadium: Marassi; Attendance: 33 000; Referee: Ferruccio Bellè

24 September 1950 3	Milan	9–2	Novara	Milan
	Nordahl 7', 30', 55', 64'; Santagostino 23', 75'; Liedholm 60'; Annovazzi 69' (pen.); Burini 78'	Report	28', 79' (pen.) Arangelovic	Stadium: San Siro; Attendance: 30,000; Referee: Luigi Gemini

1 October 1950 4	Napoli	3–5	Milan	Naples
	Formentin 63'; Amadei 87' (pen.); Masoni 89'	Report	11' Liedholm; 13' Burini; 28', 68' Nordahl; 33' (o.g.) Vultaggio	Stadium: Stadio della Liberazione; Attendance: 32 000; Referee: Guido Agnolin

8 October 1950 5	Palermo	0–2	Milan	Palermo
		Report	3' Renosto; 67' Burini	Stadium: Stadio La Favorita; Attendance: 35 000; Referee: Giovanni Galeati

15 October 1950 6	Milan	2–0	Lucchese	Milan
	Nordahl 15'; Burini 85'	Report		Stadium: San Siro; Attendance: 35 000; Referee: Leonello Bernardi

22 October 1950 7	Juventus	1–1	Milan	Turin
	K.A. Hansen 67' (pen.)	Report	47' Liedholm	Stadium: Stadio Comunale; Attendance: 79 810; Referee: Ferruccio Bellè

29 October 1950 8	Milan	4–0	Genoa	Milan
?	Nordahl 31'; Annovazzi 67'; Liedholm 68'; Santagostino 69'	Report		Stadium: San Siro; Attendance: 40000; Referee: Guido Agnolin

5 November 1950 9	Como	2–2	Milan	Como
?	Foglia 3' (o.g.); Lipizer 42' (pen.)	Report	31' (pen.) Annovazzi; 65' Renosto	Stadium: Stadio Giuseppe Sinigaglia; Attendance: 27500; Referee: Renzo Massai

12 November 1950 10	Milan	2–3	Inter	Milan
?	Nordahl 64', 76'	Report	5' Nyers; 28', 83' Skoglund	Stadium: San Siro; Attendance: 54 000; Referee: Galeati

19 November 1950 11	Padova	1–2	Milan	Padua
?	Celio 7'	Report	40' (pen.), 50' Annovazzi	Stadium: Stadio Appiani; Attendance: 18,000; Referee: Vincenzo Orlandini

26 November 1950 12	Milan	1–2	Bologna	Milan
?	Annovazzi 67' (pen.)	Report	42' Carlo Matteucci; 69' Cappello	Stadium: San Siro; Attendance: 35000; Referee: Luigi Gemini

3 December 1950 13	Triestina	3–4	Milan	Trieste
?	Pison 11'; Sessa 33' (pen.); Ciccarelli 85' (pen.)	Report	30' Nordahl; 54' (pen.) Annovazzi; 62' De Grandi; 64' Burini	Stadium: Comunale; Attendance: 12,000; Referee: Giovanni Galeati

10 December 1950 14	Milan	3–0	Torino	Milan
?	Liedholm 37', 42'; Annovazzi 78' (pen.)	Report		Stadium: San Siro; Attendance: 35 000; Referee: Guido Agnolin

17 December 1950 15	Milan	2–0	Pro Patria	Milan
?	Annovazzi 65' (pen.); Liedholm 80' (pen.)	Report		Stadium: San Siro; Attendance: 20,000; Referee: Bruno Tassini

24 December 1950 16	Atalanta	4–7	Milan	Bergamo
?	Hansen 9', 13'; Sørensen 57', 84' (pen.)	Report	3' (pen.) Annovazzi; 10' Liedholm; 12', 66' G.Nordahl; 44', 68' Burini; 50' Renosto	Stadium: Stadio Comunale; Attendance: 7500; Referee: Ferruccio Bellè

31 December 1950 17	Milan	1–0	Fiorentina	Milan
	Gren 57'	Report		Stadium: San Siro; Attendance: 25 000; Referee: Florindo Longagnani

7 January 1951 18	Lazio	1–1	Milan	Rome
?	Sentimenti V 11' (pen.)	Report	18' (pen.) Sentimenti III	Stadium: Nazionale; Attendance: 33,000; Referee: Giovanni Galeati

14 January 1951 19	Milan	2–0	Roma	Milan
?	Silvestri 33'; Nordahl 82'	Report		Stadium: San Siro; Attendance: 25,000; Referee: Cartei

21 January 1951 20	Udinese	0–0	Milan	Udine
?		Report		Stadium: Moretti; Attendance: 15000; Referee: Renzo Massai

28 January 1951 21	Milan	2–0	Sampdoria	Milan
?	Nordahl 52'; Gren 65' (pen.)	Report		Stadium: San Siro; Attendance: 17 000; Referee: Luigi Gemini

4 February 1951 22	Novara	1–3	Milan	Novara
	Arangelovic 77' (pen.)	Report	72' Annovazzi; 82' Liedholm; 85' Gren	Stadium: Comunale; Attendance: 15,000; Referee: Dattilo

11 February 1951 23	Milan	2–1	Napoli	Milan
?	Annovazzi 35'; Santagostino 58'	Report	70' (pen.) Amedei	Stadium: San Siro; Attendance: 35,000; Referee: Bruno Tassini

18 February 1951 24	Milan	9–0	Palermo	Milan
?	Burini 10', 51', 76'; Liedholm 28', 46'; Gren 37'; Nordahl 49'; Santagostino 54', 62'	Report		Stadium: San Siro; Attendance: 34 000; Referee: Agnolin

25 February 1951 25	Lucchese	1–5	Milan	Lucca
?	Scarpato 79' (pen.)	Report	34' (o.g.) Bortoletto; 57' Silvestri; 62' Burini; 76' Santagostino; 89' Gren	Stadium: Stadio Porta Elisa; Attendance: 15,000; Referee: Bellè

4 March 1951 26	Milan	2–0	Juventus	Milan
?	Nordahl 46'; Liedholm 61'	Report		Stadium: San Siro; Attendance: 52,000; Referee: Dattilo

11 March 1951 27	Genoa	0–3	Milan	Genoa
?		Report	39', 86' Nordahl; 71' Annovazzi	Stadium: Marassi; Attendance: 18,000; Referee: Giovanni Galeati

18 March 1951 28	Milan	7–2	Como	Milan
?	Nordahl 3', 37', 75'; De Grandi 29', 33'; Gren 35' (pen.); Burini 47'	Report	17' Turconi; 66' Rabitti	Stadium: San Siro; Attendance: 18000; Referee: Florindo Longagnani

25 March 1951 29	Inter	0–1	Milan	Milan
?		Report	8' Nordahl	Stadium: San Siro; Attendance: 45,000; Referee: Giovanni Galeati

1 April 1951 30	Milan	3–1	Padova	Milan
?	Nordahl 4', 21', 87'	Report	57' Curti	Stadium: San Siro; Attendance: 25 000; Referee: Luigi Gemini

15 April 1951 31	Bologna	0–0	Milan	Bologna
?		Report		Stadium: Stadio Renato Dall'Ara; Attendance: 30 000; Referee: Ferruccio Bellè

22 April 1951 32	Milan	2–0	Triestina	Milan
?	Annovazzi 20'; Nordahl 67'	Report		Stadium: San Siro; Attendance: 18,000; Referee: Renzo Massai

29 April 1951 33	Torino	0–4	Milan	Turin
?		Report	14', 21' Nordahl; 52' Renosto; 86' Annovazzi	Stadium: Stadio Filadelfia; Attendance: 20,000; Referee: Giovanni Galeati

13 May 1951 35	Pro Patria	0–0	Milan	Busto Arsizio
?		Report		Stadium: Stadio Carlo Speroni; Attendance: 14,000; Referee: Giorgio Bernardi

20 May 1951 35	Milan	3–3	Atalanta	Milan
?	Gren 17', 64'; Nordahl 62'	Report	3' Sørensen; 12', 28' Rota	Stadium: San Siro; Attendance: 20,000; Referee: Ermanno Silvano

27 May 1951 36	Fiorentina	1–1	Milan	Florence
?	Galassi 24'	Report	70' Gren	Stadium: Comunale; Attendance: 35 000; Referee: Florindo Longagnani

10 June 1951 37	Milan	1–2	Lazio	Milan
?	Nordahl 25'	Report	13' Flamini; 39' Sentimenti V	Stadium: San Siro; Attendance: 38,000; Referee: Guido Agnolin

17 June 1951 38	Roma	2–1	Milan	Rome
?	Tognon 47' (o.g.); Tre Re 79'	Report	60' Nordahl	Stadium: Stadio Nazionale; Attendance: 35,000; Referee: Florindo Longagnani

=== Latin Cup ===
==== Semifinals ====
20 June 1951	Milan (Italy)	4–1	(Spain) Atletico Madrid	Milan
?	Renosto 18', 53', 74'; Nordahl 22'	Report	70' Carlsson	Stadium: San Siro; Attendance: 10 000; Referee: (France) Boes

==== Final ====
24 June 1951	Milan (Italy)	5–0	(France) OSC Lille	Milan
?	Nordahl 32', 37', 67'; Burini 40'; Annovazzi 70'	Report		Stadium: San Siro; Attendance: 10,000; Referee: (Czechoslovakia) Schaerz

== Statistics ==
=== Squad statistics ===
Competition	Points	Home						Away						Total						GD
Competition	Points	G	W	D	L	Gs	Ga	G	W	D	L	Gs	Ga	G	W	D	L	Gs	Ga	GD
Serie A	60	19	15	1	3	63	18	19	11	7	1	44	21	38	26	8	4	107	39	+68
1951 Latin Cup	winners	2	2	0	0	9	1	-	-	-	-	-	-	2	2	0	0	9	1	+8
Totale	-	21	17	1	3	72	19	19	11	7	1	44	21	40	28	8	4	116	40	+76

=== Player statistics ===
No.	Pos	Nat	Player	Total		1950–51 Serie A		1951 Latin Cup	
No.	Pos	Nat	Player	Apps	Goals	Apps	Goals	Apps	Goals
	GK	(Italy) ITA	Lorenzo Buffon	39	0	37	0	2	0
	DF	(Italy) ITA	Andrea Bonomi	40	0	38	0	2	0
	DF	(Italy) ITA	Arturo Silvestri	38	2	38	2	0	0
	MF	(Italy) ITA	Carlo Annovazzi	39	18	38	17	1	1
	MF	(Italy) ITA	Benigno De Grandi	32	5	32	5	0	0
	MF	(Italy) ITA	Omero Tognon	38	0	38	0		
	MF	(Sweden) SWE	Nils Liedholm	33	13	33	13	0	0
	FW	(Sweden) SWE	Gunnar Gren	38	9	38	9	0	0
	FW	(Sweden) SWE	Gunnar Nordahl	39	38	37	34	2	4
	FW	(Italy) ITA	Renzo Burini	37	13	36	12	1	1
	FW	(Italy) ITA	Mario Renosto	30	8	28	5	2	3
	GK	(Italy) ITA	Giovanni Rossetti	1	0	1	0	0	0
	FW	(Italy) ITA	Aurelio Santagostino	14	9	14	9	0	0
	DF	(Italy) ITA	Mario Foglia	14	0	14	0	0	0
	FW	(Italy) ITA	Albano Vicariotto	3	0	3	0	0	0
	DF	(Italy) ITA	Carlo Belloni	1	0	1	0	0	0
	MF	(Italy) ITA	Luciano Carnier	1	0	1	0	0	0

- Source: http://calcio-seriea.net/allenatori_squadra/1950/324/
