= 1951–52 AC Milan season =

Milan Associazione Calcio
1951–52 season
- President: Umberto Trabattoni
- Manager: Lajos Czeizler
- Stadium: San Siro
- Serie A: 2nd
- Top goalscorer: League: Gunnar Nordahl (26); All: Gunnar Nordahl (26)
Home colours	Away colours

During the 1951–52 season Associazione Calcio Milan competed in Serie A.

== Summary ==
The transfer market was once again aimed at strengthening the squad. Reinforcements Pietro Grosso and Amleto Frignani arrived, with the team still led by coach Lajos Czeizler and technical director Antonio Busini. Thanks to a high-level attack, Milan's game was set up with a strong imbalance towards the offensive game. In fact, many were the games ended up with multiple goals by the Rossoneri: examples of these were the 4-0 and 5-0 against Lucchese, the 5-1 against Pro Patria, the 4-0 and 6-0 against Torino, the 4-0 against Bologna, the 4-1 against Legnano, 6-2 against Novara and 4-0 against Palermo.

In the 1951-1952 Serie A season, Milan (that in this season displayed the scudetto emblem on their shirts for the first time in their history) finished second behind Juventus after fighting with them for the title throughout the first half of the season. In the second half of it, Milan gave up in the chase also following the defeat in the head-to-head match and ended the tournament in second place, 7 points behind Juventus.

Gunnar Nordahl scored 26 goals and was the top-scorer of the club, and the second overall in the Serie A season.

== Squad ==
Note: Flags indicate national team as defined under FIFA eligibility rules; some limited exceptions apply. Players may hold more than one non-FIFA nationality.

Pos.	Nation	Player
GK	ITA	Lorenzo Buffon
GK	ITA	Ezio Bardelli
DF	ITA	Andrea Bonomi (Captain)
DF	ITA	Arturo Silvestri
DF	ITA	Francesco Zagatti
MF	ITA	Pietro Grosso
MF	ITA	Carlo Annovazzi (Vice-captain)
MF	ITA	Emilio Lavezzari
MF	SWE	Nils Liedholm

Pos.	Nation	Player
MF	ITA	Enzo Menegotti
MF	ITA	Omero Tognon
MF	ITA	Luciano Scroccaro
MF	ITA	Rino Perduca
FW	ITA	Amleto Frignani
FW	ITA	Mario Renosto
FW	SWE	Gunnar Nordahl
FW	ITA	Renzo Burini
FW	SWE	Gunnar Gren

=== Transfers ===
In
Pos.	Name	from	Type
MF	Amleto Frignani	Reggiana	-
DF	Pietro Grosso	Triestina	-
MF	Emilio Lavezzari	Seregno	-
MF	Enzo Menegotti	Modena	-
MF	Luciano Scroccaro	Dolo	-
FW	Giuseppe Secchi	Seregno	-

Out
Pos.	Name	To	Type
DF	Carlo Belloni	Triestina	-
MF	Luciano Carnier	Triestina	-
MF	Antonio Colomban	Messina	-
MF	Benigno De Grandi	Palermo	-
MF	Mario Foglia	Palermo	-
MF	Giovanni Mangini	Marzoli Palazzolo	-
GK	Giovanni Rossetti	Arsenaltaranto	-
FW	Aurelio Santagostino	Atalanta	-
FW	Giuseppe Secchi	Siracusa	-
FW	Albano Vicariotto	Torino	-

== Competitions ==
=== Serie A ===
==== League table ====
Pos	Team	Pld	W	D	L	GF	GA	GD	Pts	Qualification or relegation
1	Juventus (C)	38	26	8	4	98	34	+64	60	1952 Latin Cup
2	Milan	38	20	13	5	87	41	+46	53	
3	Internazionale	38	21	7	10	86	49	+37	49	
4	Fiorentina	38	17	9	12	52	38	+14	43	
4	Lazio	38	15	13	10	60	49	+11	43	

Source: Panini
(C) Champions

==== Results by round ====
Round	1	2	3	4	5	6	7	8	9	10	11	12	13	14	15	16	17	18	19	20	21	22	23	24	25	26	27	28	29	30	31	32	33	34	35	36	37	38
Ground	A	A	H	A	H	H	A	H	A	H	A	H	A	A	H	H	A	H	H	A	H	H	A	H	A	A	H	A	H	A	H	A	H	H	A	A	H	A
Result	W	W	D	W	W	W	W	W	D	W	D	L	D	L	W	D	D	W	L	W	W	D	D	W	D	W	D	W	W	W	W	L	D	L	D	W	D	W
Position	1	1	2	1	1	1	1	1	1	1	1	1	1	2	2	2	2	2	2	2	2	2	2	2	2	2	2	2	2	2	2	2	2	2	2	2	2	2

Source: http://calcio-seriea.net/allenatori_squadra/1948/277/
A = Away; H = Home; W = Win; D = Draw; L = Loss; = Leader, 1952 Latin Cup; = Relegation to 1952–53 Serie B

==== Matches ====
9 September 1951 1	Novara	1–2	Milan	Novara
	Annovazzi 35' (o.g.)		17' Renosto; 86' Gren	Stadium: Stadio Comunale; Attendance: 12,000; Referee: Agnolin

16 September 1951 2	Milan	4–0	Lucchese	Milan
	Nordahl 10'; Burini 37', 40'; Liedholm 84'			Stadium: Stadio San Siro; Attendance: 20,000; Referee: Canavesio

23 September 1951 3	Udinese	1–1	Milan	Udine
	Bacci 80'		7' Renosto	Stadium: Stadio Moretti; Attendance: 18,500; Referee: Massai

30 September 1951 4	Milan	5–1	Pro Patria	Milan
	Renosto 12', 52', 70'; Burini 55'; Annovazzi 83'		77' Hofling	Stadium: Stadio San Siro; Attendance: 22,000; Referee: Liverani

7 October 1951 5	Como	1–2	Milan	Como
	Rabitti 13'		31' Burini; 83' Nordahl	Stadium: Stadio Giuseppe Sinigaglia; Attendance: 18,000; Referee: Orlandini

14 October 1951 6	Milan	2–1	Sampdoria	Milan
	Burini 50'; Nordahl 73'		40' Arnaldo Lucentini	Stadium: Stadio San Siro; Attendance: 40,000; Referee: Piemonte

21 October 1951 7	Torino	0–6	Milan	Turin
			38' Burini; 40', 64' Liedholm; 53' Renosto; 62' Annovazzi; 69' (o.g.) Grava	Stadium: Stadio Filadelfia; Attendance: 48,354; Referee: Agnolin

28 October 1951 8	Milan	4–0	Bologna	Milan
	Burini 47', 75', 76'; Renosto 56' (pen.)			Stadium: Stadio San Siro; Attendance: 45,000; Referee: Belè

4 November 1951 9	Inter	2–2	Milan	Milan
	Nyers 2'; Lorenzi 26'		22' Burini; 75' Tognon	Stadium: Stadio San Siro; Attendance: 50,000; Referee: Massai

18 November 1951 10	Napoli	0–2	Milan	Naples
			7' Nordahl; 82' Renosto	Stadium: Stadio del Vomero; Attendance: 38,000; Referee: Tassini

2 December 1951 11	Milan	1–1	SPAL	Milan
	Burini 15'		5' Bülent	Stadium: Stadio San Siro; Attendance: 40,000; Referee: Cartei

9 December 1951 12	Padova	5–2	Milan	Padova
	Beraldo 5'; Martegani 55', 90'; Prunecchi 65', 73'		31' Nordahl; 77' (pen.) Renosto	Stadium: Stadio Silvio Appiani; Attendance: 21,000; Referee: Gemini

16 December 1951 13	Milan	1–1	Juventus	Milan
	Nordahl 58'		53' Hansen	Stadium: Stadio San Siro; Attendance: 45,000; Referee: Tassini

23 December 1951 14	Atalanta	1–0	Milan	Bergamo
	Santogostino 78'			Stadium: Stadio Comunale; Attendance: 18,000; Referee: Bellè

30 December 1951 15	Milan	4–1	Legnano	Milan
	Nordahl 9'; Liedholm 13', 69'; Frignani 39'		26' Trevisan	Stadium: Stadio San Siro; Attendance: 19,000; Referee: Pieri

6 January 1952 16	Milan	1–1	Lazio	Milan
	Silvestri 49'		53' Löfgren	Stadium: Stadio San Siro; Attendance: 20,000; Referee: Pieri

13 January 1952 17	Palermo	1–1	Milan	Palermo
	De Grandi 45'		25' Nordahl	Stadium: Stadio La Favorita; Attendance: 30,000; Referee: Tassini

20 January 1952 18	Milan	2–0	Triestina	Milan
	Frignani 14'; Nordahl 35'			Stadium: Stadio San Siro; Attendance: 20,000; Referee: Corallo

27 January 1952 19	Fiorentina	1–0	Milan	Florence
	Ekner 12'			Stadium: Stadio Comunale; Attendance: 20,000; Referee: Orlandini

3 February 1952 20	Milan	6–2	Novara	Milan
	Gren 14'; Burini 35'; Nordahl 53', 54', 90'; Amleto Frignani 85'		13', 60' (pen.) Piola	Stadium: Stadio San Siro; Attendance: 25,000; Referee: Bellè

20 February 1952 21	Lucchese	0–5	Milan	Lucca
			7', 26', 81' Nordahl; 24' Annovazzi; 87' Renzo Burini	Stadium: Stadio Porta Elisa; Attendance: 18,000; Referee: Gemini

17 February 1952 22	Milan	0–0	Udinese	Milan
				Stadium: Stadio San Siro; Attendance: 25,000; Referee: Jonni

24 February 1952 23	Pro Patria	2–2	Milan	Busto Arsizio
	Hofling 43'; Orzan 47'		1' Gren; 71' Nordahl	Stadium: Stadio Comunale; Attendance: 14,000; Referee: Agnolin

9 March 1952 24	Milan	2–0	Como	Milan
	Liedholm 37'; Nordahl 81'			Stadium: Stadio San Siro; Attendance: 20,000; Referee: Cartei

16 March 1952 25	Sampdoria	1–1	Milan	Genoa
	Sabbatella 44'		20' Nordahl	Stadium: Stadio Luigi Ferraris; Attendance: 35,000; Referee: Massai

23 March 1952 26	Milan	4–1	Torino	Milan
	Nordahl 21'; Gren 46'; Burini 65' (pen.), 74'		89' Pozzi	Stadium: Stadio San Siro; Attendance: 20,000; Referee: Pieri

30 March 1952 27	Bologna	0–0	Milan	Bologna
				Stadium: Stadio Comunale; Attendance: 26,000; Referee: Gemini

6 April 1952 28	Milan	2–1	Inter	Milan
	Liedholm 54'; Nordahl 76'		57' Nyers	Stadium: Stadio San Siro; Attendance: 45,000; Referee: Massai

13 April 1952 29	Milan	3–2	Napoli	Milan
	Frignani 45'; Liedholm 66'; Burini 80' (pen.)		12', 89' (pen.) Mike	Stadium: Stadio San Siro; Attendance: 20,000; Referee: Pieri

20 April 1952 30	SPAL	1–2	Milan	Ferrara
	Colombi 73' (pen.)		24' Frignani; 70' (o.g.) Ørnvold	Stadium: Stadio Comunale; Attendance: 22,000; Referee: Agnolin

27 April 1952 31	Milan	3–0	Padova	Milan
	Annovazzi 7'; Nordahl 57'; Gren 79'			Stadium: Stadio San Siro; Attendance: 15,000; Referee: Longagnani

4 May 1952 32	Juventus	3–1	Milan	Turin
	Vivolo 3'; Boniperti 19'; Praest 65'		88' Gren	Stadium: Stadio Comunale; Attendance: 65,000; Referee: Gemini

11 May 1952 33	Milan	4–4	Atalanta	Milan
	Burini 6', 28', 71'; Nordahl 54'		3' Sørensen; 32', 54' Santagostino; 84' Jeppson	Stadium: Stadio San Siro; Attendance: 18,000; Referee: Corallo

18 May 1952 34	Legnano	2–1	Milan	Brescia
	Sassi 7', 86'		83' Liedholm	Stadium: Stadium di viale Piave; Attendance: 7,000; Referee: Coppa

1 June 1952 35	Lazio	1–1	Milan	Rome
	Larsen 51'		67' Gren	Stadium: Stadio Nazionale; Attendance: 16,000; Referee: Liverani

8 June 1952 36	Milan	4–0	Palermo	Milan
	Nordahl 9', 74', 90'; Burini 54' (pen.)			Stadium: Stadio San Siro; Attendance: 9,000; Referee: Bellè

15 June 1952 37	Triestina	1–1	Milan	Trieste
	Petrozzi 27'		13' Frignani	Stadium: Stadio Comunale; Attendance: 11,000; Referee: De Leo

22 June 1952 38	Milan	3–1	Fiorentina	Milan
	Burini 26', 31' (pen.); Nordahl 54'		81' Beltrandi	Stadium: Stadio San Siro; Attendance: 6,000; Referee: Corallo

== Statistics ==
=== Squad statistics ===
Competition	Points	Home						Away						Total						GD
Competition	Points	G	W	D	L	Gs	Ga	G	W	D	L	Gs	Ga	G	W	D	L	Gs	Ga	GD
1951–52 Serie A	53	19	14	5	0	55	17	19	6	8	5	32	24	38	20	13	5	87	41	+46

=== Players statistics ===
No.	Pos	Nat	Player	Total		1951–52 Serie A	
No.	Pos	Nat	Player	Apps	Goals	Apps	Goals
	GK	(Italy) ITA	Lorenzo Buffon	26	-28	26	-28
	DF	(Italy) ITA	Arturo Silvestri	35	1	35	1
	DF	(Italy) ITA	Andrea Bonomi	22	0	22	0
	MF	(Italy) ITA	Carlo Annovazzi	37	4	37	4
	MF	(Italy) ITA	Omero Tognon	37	1	37	1
	MF	(Italy) ITA	Pietro Grosso	32	0	32	0
	MF	(Sweden) SWE	Nils Liedholm	38	9	38	9
	FW	(Sweden) SWE	Gunnar Gren	31	7	31	7
	FW	(Sweden) SWE	Gunnar Nordahl	38	26	38	26
	FW	(Italy) ITA	Amleto Frignani	27	6	27	6
	FW	(Italy) ITA	Renzo Burini	36	22	36	22
	GK	(Italy) ITA	Ezio Bardelli	12	-13	12	-13
	MF	(Italy) ITA	Enzo Menegotti	16	0	16	0
	FW	(Italy) ITA	Mario Renosto	15	9	15	9
	MF	(Italy) ITA	Emilio Lavezzari	11	0	11	0
	DF	(Italy) ITA	Francesco Zagatti	4	0	4	0
	MF	(Italy) ITA	Luciano Scroccaro	1	0	1	0

== See also ==
- AC Milan

== Bibliography ==
- Almanacco illustrato del Milan, ed: 2, March 2005. Panini.
- Enrico Tosi. La storia del Milan, May 2005. Italia/Italy cid Tosi.
- Milan. Sempre con te, December 2009. Mondadori. 2009. ISBN 978-88-04-59118-4.
