= 1949–50 AC Milan season =

Associazione Calcio Milan
1949–50 season
- President: Umberto Trabattoni
- Manager: Lajos Czeizler
- Stadium: Stadio San Siro; Arena Civica (some matches)
- Serie A: 2nd
- Top goalscorer: Nordahl (35)
| Home colours | Away colours |

During the 1949–50 season Associazione Calcio Milan competed in Serie A.

== Summary ==
For the 1949–50 campaign arrived to the club, thanks to the management talent of President Umberto Trabattoni, in 1948 Olympic Games Swedish players Nils Liedholm and Gunnar Gren, they were added to the squad amid striker Gunnar Nordahl, actually in Milan since January 1949: a “trio” known as Gre-No-Li. Another transfer in was goalkeeper Lorenzo Buffon. Also, in this season Milan played at Arena Civica meanwhile in San Siro the team played the matches where higher attendances were expected.

This season was best remembered for fans as crucial to the modern Milan era winning titles in years for coming after forty years without a trophy. The squad changed its playing style with a more offensive strategy with spectacular matches instead of physical and defensive tactic. The change of strategy attracted more fans to the stadium and attendances will improve in the next decades.

During 1949-50 Serie A campaign, first season after the Superga disaster, the squad reached the goal scoring record for a single season: 118 goals scored. On 7 February 1950, Milan defeated Juventus 7–1 in Torino, also the first TV broadcasting of a Serie A match. Hungarian coach Lajos Czeizler took the club to the second place five points behind champion Juventus. Swedish striker Nordahl won his first topgoalscorer title “capocannoniere” with 35 goals scored.

During 1949 the club moved its headquarters from "Telegrafo Calciomilano" in Del Lauro 4 to Venezia 36.

== Squad ==
Note: Flags indicate national team as defined under FIFA eligibility rules; some limited exceptions apply. Players may hold more than one non-FIFA nationality.

| Pos. | Nation | Player |
|---|---|---|
| GK | ITA | Ezio Bardelli |
| GK | ITA | Lorenzo Buffon |
| GK | ITA | Efrem Milanese |
| DF | ITA | Carlo Belloni |
| DF | ITA | Andrea Bonomi (Captain) |
| DF | ITA | Mario Foglia |
| DF | ITA | Giosuè Sanvito |
| MF | ITA | Carlo Annovazzi (vice-captain) |
| MF | ITA | Benigno De Grandi |

| Pos. | Nation | Player |
|---|---|---|
| MF | SWE | Nils Liedholm |
| MF | ITA | Omero Tognon |
| FW | ITA | Renzo Burini |
| FW | ITA | Enrico Candiani |
| FW | ITA | Franco De Gregori |
| FW | SWE | Gunnar Gren |
| FW | SWE | Gunnar Nordahl |
| FW | ITA | Giuseppe Rinaldi |
| FW | ITA | Aurelio Santagostino |

=== Transfers ===
In
| Pos. | Name | from | Type |
|---|---|---|---|
| FW | Gunnar Gren | IFK Göteborg | – |
| MF | Nils Liedholm | IFK Norrköping | – |
| GK | Lorenzo Buffon | Portogruaro | – |
| DF | Pietro Bettoli | Rimini | – |
| FW | Enrico Candiani | Pro Patria | – |
| MF | Benigno De Grandi | Seregno | – |
| FW | Fabio Frugali | U.S. Alessandria | – |
| FW | Giuseppe Rinaldi | Pescara | – |
| DF | Giosuè Sanvito | Pro Sesto | – |

Out
| Pos. | Name | To | Type |
|---|---|---|---|
| MF | Giuseppe Antonini | Reggiana | – |
| FW | Aleksandar Aranđelović | Padova Calcio | – |
| DF | Osvaldo Biancardi | Empoli F.C. | – |
| FW | Riccardo Carapellese | Torino | – |
| FW | Pietro Degano | Venezia F.C. | – |
| DF | Edy Gratton | Sampdoria | – |
| DF | Lino Grava | Vittorio Veneto | – |
| MF | Albert Guðmundsson | RC Paris | – |
| MF | Michele Manenti | Modena | – |
| FW | Elio Onorato | Torino | – |
| FW | Héctor Puricelli | Legnano | – |
| MF | Paddy Sloan | Udinese Calcio | – |
| MF | Gianni Toppan | Lucchese | – |

== Competitions ==
=== Serie A ===
==== League table ====
| Pos | Team | Pld | W | D | L | GF | GA | GD | Pts | Qualification or relegation |
|---|---|---|---|---|---|---|---|---|---|---|
| 1 | Juventus (C) | 38 | 28 | 6 | 4 | 100 | 43 | +57 | 62 | |
| 2 | Milan | 38 | 27 | 3 | 8 | 118 | 45 | +73 | 57 | |
| 3 | Internazionale | 38 | 21 | 7 | 10 | 99 | 60 | +39 | 49 | |
| 4 | Lazio | 38 | 18 | 10 | 10 | 67 | 43 | +24 | 46 | Qualified for the 1950 Latin Cup |
| 5 | Fiorentina | 38 | 18 | 8 | 12 | 76 | 57 | +19 | 44 | |

Source: Panini
(C) Champions

==== Results by round ====
| Round | 1 | 2 | 3 | 4 | 5 | 6 | 7 | 8 | 9 | 10 | 11 | 12 | 13 | 14 | 15 | 16 | 17 | 18 | 19 | 20 | 21 | 22 | 23 | 24 | 25 | 26 | 27 | 28 | 29 | 30 | 31 | 32 | 33 | 34 | 35 | 36 | 37 | 38 |
|---|---|---|---|---|---|---|---|---|---|---|---|---|---|---|---|---|---|---|---|---|---|---|---|---|---|---|---|---|---|---|---|---|---|---|---|---|---|---|
| Ground | A | A | H | A | H | H | A | H | A | H | A | H | A | A | H | H | A | H | H | A | H | H | A | H | A | A | H | A | H | A | H | A | H | H | A | A | H | A |
| Result | W | D | W | L | W | W | D | L | W | L | W | W | W | W | W | W | W | D | L | W | W | W | W | W | W | L | W | L | W | W | W | W | L | W | L | W | W | W |
| Position | 1 | 5 | 2 | 6 | 4 | 2 | 3 | 5 | 3 | 5 | 3 | 3 | 3 | 2 | 2 | 2 | 2 | 2 | 2 | 2 | 2 | 2 | 2 | 2 | 2 | 2 | 2 | 2 | 2 | 2 | 2 | 2 | 2 | 2 | 2 | 2 | 2 | 2 |

Source: http://calcio-seriea.net/allenatori_squadra/1948/277/
A = Away; H = Home; W = Win; D = Draw; L = Loss; = Leader, 1950 Latin Cup; = Relegation to 1949–50 Serie B

==== Matches ====
| 11 September 1949 1 | Sampdoria | 1–3 | Milan | Genoa |
| | Baldini 27' | Report | 23' Burini; 37' Liedholm; 79' Rinaldi | Stadium: Stadio Luigi Ferraris; Attendance: 32000; Referee: Silvano |

| 18 September 1949 2 | Milan | 1–1 | Como | Milan |
| | Liedholm 89' | Report | 90' Lipizer | Stadium: Stadio San Siro; Attendance: 40,000; Referee: Tassini |

| 25 September 1949 3 | Venezia | 1–4 | Milan | Venice |
| | Golob 18' | Report | 30', 48' Gren; 60' Annovazzi; 62' Nordahl | Stadium: Stadio Pier Luigi Penzo; Attendance: 17,500; Referee: Pera |

| 2 October 1949 4 | Milan | 0–1 | Juventus | Milan |
| | | Report | 51' Martino | Stadium: Stadio San Siro; Attendance: 55,000; Referee: Dattilo |

| 9 October 1949 5 | Pro Patria | 2–4 | Milan | Busto Arsizio |
| | Toros 16'; Pernigo 38' | Report | 26', 64' Burini; 70', 72' Nordahl | Stadium: Stadio Comunale; Attendance: 14,000; Referee: Bernardi |

| 16 October 1949 6 | Milan | 4–1 | Palermo | Milan |
| | Nordahl 8'; Rinaldi 17'; Gren 31' (rig); Burini 83' | Report | 57' Di Maso | Stadium: Stadio San Siro; Attendance: 28,000; Referee: Longagnani |

| 20 October 1949 7 | Milan | 0–0 | Lazio | Milan |
| | | Report | Antonazzi (red card) | Stadium: Arena Civica; Attendance: 18,000; Referee: Poggipollini |

| 23 October 1949 8 | Torino | 3–2 | Milan | Turin |
| | Bengtsson 11'; Hjalmarsson 36'; Carapellese 73' | Report | 42' Rinaldi; 63' Nordahl | Stadium: Stadio Filadelfia; Attendance: 34,500; Referee: Bellè |

| 30 October 1949 9 | Milan | 2–1 | Atalanta | Milan |
| | Liedholm 48'; Gren 72' | Report | 42' Sørensen | Stadium: Stadio San Siro; Attendance: 25,000; Referee: Pieri |

| 6 November 1949 10 | Inter | 6–5 | Milan | Milan |
| | Nyers 10', 40' (rig); Amadei 39', 50', 64'; Lorenzi 58' | Report | 1', 7' Candiani; 14' Nordahl; 19' Liedholm; 59' Annovazzi | Stadium: Stadio San Siro; Attendance: 60,000; Referee: Orlandini |

| 13 November 1949 11 | Milan | 2–0 | Lucchese | Milan |
| | Nordahl 16'; Liedholm 17' | Report | | Stadium: Stadio San Siro; Attendance: 20,000; Referee: Silvano |

| 20 November 1949 12 | Milan | 4–1 | Fiorentina | Milan |
| | Santagostino 10'; Nordahl 25', 47'; Burini 58' | Report | 20' Pandolfini | Stadium: Stadio San Siro; Attendance: 13,000; Referee: Gemini |

| 4 December 1949 13 | Novara | 1–3 | Milan | Novara |
| | Pombia 8' | Report | 44', 81' Candiani; 73' Nordahl | Stadium: Stadio Comunale; Attendance: 12,000; Referee: Pera |

| 8 December 1949 14 | Milan | 5–0 | Genoa | Milan |
| | Nordahl 6', 87'; Gren 48' (pen.), 64'; Liedholm 68' | Report | | Stadium: Stadio San Siro; Attendance: 15,000; Referee: Gemini |

| 11 December 1949 15 | Bologna | 0–1 | Milan | Bologna |
| | Ballacci (red card) | Report | 9' Burini | Stadium: Stadio Comunale; Attendance: 25,000; Referee: Pieri |

| 18 December 1949 16 | Milan | 9–1 | Bari | Milan |
| | Burini 2', 71'; Liedholm 11', 79'; Santagostino 17', 25', 42', 90'; Gren 33' (pen.) | Report | 66' Stradella | Stadium: Stadio San Siro; Attendance: 15,000; Referee: Scotto |

| 26 December 1949 17 | Milan | 4–2 | Padova | Milan |
| | Gren 52', 68' (penalty missed); Nordahl 56'; Burini 81' | Report | 70', 88' Checchetti | Stadium: Stadio San Siro; Attendance: 18,000; Referee: Galeati |

| 1 January 1950 18 | Triestina | 0–0 | Milan | Trieste |
| | | Report | | Stadium: Stadio Comunale; Attendance: 15,000; Referee: Gemini |

| 8 January 1950 19 | Roma | 1–0 | Milan | Rome |
| | Tontodonati 44' | Report | | Stadium: Stadio Nazionale; Attendance: 32,000; Referee: Gamba |

| 15 January 1950 20 | Milan | 5–1 | Sampdoria | Milan |
| | Candiani 13'; Liedholm 24', 50'; Burini 76', 80' | Report | 29' Bassetto | Stadium: Stadio San Siro; Attendance: 12,000; Referee: Tassini |

| 22 January 1950 21 | Como | 1–4 | Milan | Como |
| | Dossi 69' | Report | 3', 36', 81' Nordahl; 27' Renzo Burini | Stadium: Stadio Giuseppe Sinigaglia; Attendance: 20,000; Referee: Bellè |

| 29 January 1950 22 | Milan | 2–0 | Venezia | Milan |
| | Liedholm 44'; Gren 61' | Report | | Stadium: Stadio San Siro; Attendance: 10,000; Referee: Dattilo |

| 5 February 1950 23 | Juventus | 1–7 | Milan | Turin |
| | Hansen 12'; Parola (red card) | Report | 15', 26', 49' Nordahl; 23' Gren; 24' Liedholm; 70' Burini; 84' Candiani | Stadium: Stadio Comunale; Attendance: 46,643; Referee: Galeati |

| 12 February 1950 24 | Milan | 7–1 | Pro Patria | Milan |
| | Gren 6', 65' (pen.); Nordahl 10', 68' (rig); Annovazzi 43'; Liedholm 44'; Candiani 73' | Report | 35' Turconi II | Stadium: Stadio San Siro; Attendance: 34,000; Referee: Longagnani |

| 19 February 1950 25 | Palermo | 0–1 | Milan | Palermo |
| | | Report | 84' Annovazzi | Stadium: Stadio La Favorita; Attendance: 32,000; Referee: Pera |

| 23 February 1950 26 | Lazio | 3–2 | Milan | Rome |
| | Magrini 24'; Penzo 36'; Remondini 62' | Report | 30' (pen.) Gren; 60' Nordahl | Stadium: Stadio Nazionale; Attendance: 33,000; Referee: Pieri |

| 5 March 1950 27 | Milan | 7–0 | Torino | Milan |
| | Burini 1', 36'; Nordahl 6', 23', 29', 43'; Liedholm 90' | Report | | Stadium: Stadio San Siro; Attendance: 25,000; Referee: Galeati |

| 12 March 1950 28 | Atalanta | 5–2 | Milan | Bergamo |
| | Sørensen 7', 21'; Fabbri 14'; Caprile 19', 69' | Report | 11' Nordahl; 81' (rig) Gren | Stadium: Stadio Comunale; Attendance: 20,000; Referee: Massai |

| 19 March 1950 29 | Milan | 3–1 | Inter | Milan |
| | Basso 8' (o.g.); Gren 41' (rig); Candiani 89' | Report | 14' Lorenzi | Stadium: Stadio San Siro; Attendance: 52,000; Referee: Bellè |

| 26 March 1950 30 | Lucchese | 0–2 | Milan | Lucca |
| | | Report | 25' Burini; 38' Gren | Stadium: Stadio Porta Elisa; Attendance: 9,500; Referee: Pieri |

| 9 April 1950 31 | Fiorentina | 1–3 | Milan | Florence |
| | Sperotto 58' | Report | 17' Nordahl; 81' (aut) Eliani; 89' Liedholm | Stadium: Stadio Comunale; Attendance: 45,000; Referee: Galeati |

| 16 April 1950 32 | Milan | 5–0 | Novara | Milan |
| | Burini 20', 87'; Liedholm 45', 69'; Nordahl 54'; Gren (penalty missed) | Report | | Stadium: Stadio San Siro; Attendance: 12,000; Referee: Dattilo |

| 23 April 1950 33 | Genoa | 1–0 | Milan | Genoa |
| | Koenig 56' | Report | | Stadium: Stadio Luigi Ferraris; Attendance: 36,000; Referee: Bernardi |

| 30 April 1950 34 | Milan | 2–0 | Bologna | Milan |
| | Nordahl 11'; Burini 72' | Report | | Stadium: Stadio San Siro; Attendance: 20,000; Referee: Massai |

| 7 May 1950 35 | Bari | 2–0 | Milan | Bari |
| | Sarosi 45'; Fabian 78' | Report | | Stadium: Stadio della Vittoria; Attendance: 21,000; Referee: Pera |

| 14 May 1950 36 | Padova | 1–2 | Milan | Padua |
| | Curti 61' | Report | 31' Annovazzi; 40' Burini | Stadium: Stadio Silvio Appiani; Attendance: 9,000; Referee: Massai |

| 21 May 1950 37 | Milan | 5–2 | Triestina | Milan |
| | Liedholm 21'; Gren 43' (rig); Burini 60'; Nordahl 81', 90' (penalty missed) '36 | Report | 40' Petrozzi; 83' Boscolo; Zorzin (penalty missed) '61 | Stadium: Stadio San Siro; Attendance: 11,000; Referee: Longagnani |

| 28 May 1950 38 | Milan | 6–2 | Roma | Milan |
| | Nordahl 26', 55'; Liedholm 30'; Rinaldi 56', 76', 81' | Report | 64' (pen.) Bacci; 73' Lucchesi | Stadium: Stadio San Siro; Attendance: 25,000; Referee: Galeati |

== Statistics ==
=== Squad statistics ===
| Competition | Points | Home | | | | | | Away | | | | | | Total | | | | | | GD |
| Competition | Points | G | W | D | L | Gs | Ga | G | W | D | L | Gs | Ga | G | W | D | L | Gs | Ga | GD |
|---|---|---|---|---|---|---|---|---|---|---|---|---|---|---|---|---|---|---|---|---|
| 1949–50 Serie A | 57 | 19 | 16 | 2 | 1 | 73 | 15 | 19 | 11 | 1 | 7 | 45 | 30 | 28 | 27 | 3 | 8 | 118 | 45 | +73 |

=== Players statistics ===
| No. | Pos | Nat | Player | Total | | Serie A | |
| No. | Pos | Nat | Player | Apps | Goals | Apps | Goals |
|---|---|---|---|---|---|---|---|
| | GK | (Italy) ITA | Lorenzo Buffon | 19 | -22 | 19 | -22 |
| | DF | (Italy) ITA | Carlo Annovazzi | 38 | 5 | 38 | 5 |
| | DF | (Italy) ITA | Carlo Belloni | 25 | 0 | 25 | 0 |
| | DF | (Italy) ITA | Andrea Bonomi | 25 | 0 | 25 | 0 |
| | DF | (Italy) ITA | Mario Foglia | 38 | 0 | 38 | 0 |
| | MF | (Italy) ITA | Renzo Burini | 35 | 21 | 35 | 21 |
| | MF | (Italy) ITA | Enrico Candiani | 22 | 8 | 22 | 8 |
| | MF | (Italy) ITA | Omero Tognon | 38 | 0 | 38 | 0 |
| | MF | (Sweden) SWE | Nils Liedholm | 37 | 18 | 37 | 18 |
| | FW | (Sweden) SWE | Gunnar Gren | 37 | 18 | 37 | 18 |
| | FW | (Sweden) SWE | Gunnar Nordahl | 37 | 35 | 37 | 35 |
| | GK | (Italy) ITA | Ezio Bardelli | 13 | -12 | 13 | -12 |
| | FW | (Italy) ITA | Franco De Gregori | 13 | 0 | 13 | 0 |
| | FW | (Italy) ITA | Giuseppe Rinaldi | 12 | 6 | 12 | 6 |
| | DF | (Italy) ITA | Benigno De Grandi | 12 | 0 | 12 | 0 |
| | FW | (Italy) ITA | Aurelio Santagostino | 8 | 5 | 8 | 5 |
| | GK | (Italy) ITA | Efrem Milanese | 6 | -11 | 6 | -11 |
| | DF | (Italy) ITA | Giosuè Sanvito | 3 | 0 | 3 | 0 |

- Source: http://calcio-seriea.net/rose/1949/313/

== See also ==
- A.C. Milan

== Bibliography ==
- Almanacco illustrato del Milan, 2nd edition March 2005. Panini.
- Almanacco illustrato del Milan, 1st edition, 1999. Panini.
