= 1948–49 AC Milan season =

Associazione Calcio Milan
1948–49 season
- President: Umberto Trabattoni
- Manager: Giuseppe Bigogno
- Stadium: San Siro; Arena Civica (some matches)
- Serie A: 3rd
- Top goalscorer: Carapellese (17)
Home colours	Away colours

During the 1948–49 season AC Milan competed in Serie A.

== Summary ==
After years of no foreign players, several transfers in for rossonero arrived during summer such as: midfielder Albert Guðmundsson from AS Nancy Lorraine and Northern Irish Forward Paddy Sloan from Sheffield United. Sloan pioneered the way for the likes of Liam Brady and Robbie Keane by becoming the first Irishman to play in Serie A. After a failed bid on Danish Johannes Pløger, who was signed by Juventus at the very start of the second half of the season, Trabattoni received in compensation by the same bianconero club the rights for the transfer of Swedish Forward Gunnar Nordahl, recently the winner of a gold medal at the 1948 Summer Olympic Games in London, a future legend for the rossonero club.

Meanwhile, in the league, the squad finished the race on a decent 3rd spot.

== Squad ==
Source: Note: Flags indicate national team as defined under FIFA eligibility rules; some limited exceptions apply. Players may hold more than one non-FIFA nationality.

Pos.	Nation	Player
GK	ITA	Efrem Milanese
GK	ITA	Giovanni Rossetti
DF	ITA	Carlo Belloni
DF	ITA	Andrea Bonomi
DF	ITA	Mario Foglia
DF	ITA	Edy Gratton
DF	ITA	Gianni Toppan
MF	ITA	Carlo Annovazzi
MF	ITA	Giuseppe Antonini (captain)
MF	ITA	Osvaldo Biancardi
MF	ISL	Albert Guðmundsson

Pos.	Nation	Player
MF	ITA	Michele Manenti
MF	ITA	Omero Tognon
FW	ITA	Renzo Burini
FW	ITA	Riccardo Carapellese
FW	ITA	Pietro Degano
FW	ITA	Franco De Gregori
FW	SWE	Gunnar Nordahl
FW	ITA	Elio Onorato
FW	URU	Héctor Puricelli (Captain)
FW	ITA	Aurelio Santagostino
FW	NIR	Paddy Sloan

=== Transfers ===
In
Pos.	Name	from	Type
FW	Aleksandar Aranđelović	Crvena Zvezda	–
DF	Carlo Belloni	Varese	–
DF	Osvaldo Biancardi	Fanfulla	–
MF	Albert Guðmundsson	Nancy	–
MF	Michele Manenti	Magenta	–
FW	Elio Onorato	Salernitana	–
MF	Paddy Sloan	Sheffield United	

Out
Pos.	Name	To	Type
DF	Felice Cerri	Alessandria	
GK	Gianni Mattioni	Seregno	
DF	Carlo Piccardi	Atalanta	

==== Winter ====
In
Pos.	Name	from	Type
FW	Gunnar Nordahl	IFK Norrköping	–

Out
Pos.	Name	To	Type
FW	Aleksandar Aranđelović	Padova	–

== Competitions ==
=== Serie A ===
==== League table ====
Pos	Team	Pld	W	D	L	GF	GA	GD	Pts	Qualification or relegation
1	Torino (C)	38	25	10	3	78	34	+44	60	1949 Latin Cup
2	Internazionale	38	22	11	5	85	39	+46	55	
3	Milan	38	21	8	9	83	52	+31	50	
4	Juventus	38	18	8	12	64	47	+17	44	
5	Sampdoria	38	16	9	13	74	63	+11	41	

Source: Panini
(C) Champions

==== Results by round ====
Round	1	2	3	4	5	6	7	8	9	10	11	12	13	14	15	16	17	18	19	20	21	22	23	24	25	26	27	28	29	30	31	32	33	34	35	36	37	38	39
Ground	A	A	H	A	H	H	A	H	A	H	A	H	A	A	H	H	A	H	H	A	H	H	A	H	A	A	H	A	H	A	H	A	H	H	A	A	H	A	H
Result	W	L	W	W	L	W	D	W	L	W	D	D	W	L	W	D	L	P	W	L	W	W	D	W	D	W	W	L	W	W	W	D	W	D	W	L	W	L	W
Position	1	7	5	3	6	3	4	4	5	4	4	4	4	5	4	4	6	6	7	7	7	7	5	5	5	3	3	3	3	3	3	3	3	3	3	3	3	3	3

Source: http://calcio-seriea.net/allenatori_squadra/1948/277/
A = Away; H = Home; W = Win; D = Draw; L = Loss; = Leader, 1949 Latin Cup; = Relegation to 1949–50 Serie B

==== Matches ====
- .- Source:http://calcio-seriea.net/partite/1948/277/

19 September 1948 1	AS Bari	0–2	Milan	Bari
			13' Carapellese; 15' Puricelli	Stadium: Stadio della Vittoria; Attendance: 35 000; Referee: Orlandini

26 September 1948 2	Palermo	2–1	Milan	Palermo
	De Santis 3'; Vycpálek 73'		35' (o.g.) Piccinini	Stadium: Stadio La Favorita; Attendance: 25 000; Referee: Gemini

3 October 1948 3	Milan	3–0	Atalanta	Milan
	Guðmundsson 11'; Degano 34'; Antonini 42'			Stadium: San Siro; Attendance: 37 500; Referee: Poggipollini

10 October 1948 4	AS Roma	1–2	Milan	Rome
	Pesaola 3'		4' Degano; 24' Puricelli	Stadium: Nazionale; Attendance: 32000; Referee: Canavesio

16 October 1948 5	Milan	0–2	Inter	Milan
			35' Nyers; 59' Lorenzi	Stadium: San Siro; Attendance: 55 000; Referee: Gemini

24 October 1948 6	Milan	3–1	Triestina	Milan
	Onorato 19', 20'; Sloan 48'		49' Tosolini	Stadium: San Siro; Attendance: 25 000; Referee: Scotto

31 October 1948 7	Lucchese	2–2	Milan	Lucca
	Toth 8'; Conti 12'		46' Carapellese; 51' Sloan	Stadium: Stadio Porta Elisa; Attendance: 15 000; Referee: Poggipollini

4 November 1948 8	Milan	1–0	Torino	Milan
	Burini 62'			Stadium: San Siro; Attendance: 45 000; Referee: Orlandini

7 November 1948 9	Fiorentina	4–2	Milan	Florence
	Marchetti 3'; Pandolfini 11'; Galassi 42'; Sperotto 64'		40' Toppan; 49' Onorato	Stadium: Comunale; Attendance: 25 000; Referee: Silvano

14 November 1948 10	Milan	4–1	Novara	Milan
	Burini 36'; Onorato 69'; Carapellese 79'; Santagostino 86'		30' Tieghi	Stadium: San Siro; Attendance: 12 000; Referee: Cambi

21 November 1948 11	Modena	0–0	Milan	Modena
				Stadium: Comunale; Attendance: 15 000; Referee: Pera

28 November 1948 12	Milan	1–1	Juventus	Milan
	Annovazzi 12'		8' Boniperti	Stadium: San Siro; Attendance: 41 000; Referee: Bellè

5 December 1948 13	Padova	1–4	Milan	Padova
	Adcock 73'		21' Santagostino; 45' De Gregori; 59' Carapellese; 77' Sloan	Stadium: Stadio Silvio Appiani; Attendance: 20 000; Referee: Gamba

8 December 1948 14	Genoa	1–0	Milan	Genoa
	Verdeal 78'			Stadium: Stadio Luigi Ferraris; Attendance: 30 000; Referee: Pera

12 December 1948 15	Milan	3–0	SS Lazio	Milan
	Degano 4'; Burini 51'; Carapellese 87'			Stadium: San Siro; Attendance: 12 000; Referee: Scotto

19 December 1948 16	Milan	2–2	Bologna	Milan
	Carapellese 15', 24'		9', 87' Mayer	Stadium: San Siro; Attendance: 28 000; Referee: Bellè

26 December 1948 17	Livorno	2–1	Milan	Livorno
	Stradella 39'; Dante 67'		56' Carapellese	Stadium: Comunale; Attendance: 14 000; Referee: Bernardi

2 January 1949 18	Milan	susp.	Pro Patria	Milan
				Stadium: Arena Civica; Referee: Giuseppe Boffardi
Note: Match suspended due to field issues.

5 January 1949 19	Sampdoria	2–1	Milan	Genoa
	Gei 7'; Bassetto 22'		55' Carapellese	Stadium: Stadio Luigi Ferraris; Attendance: 25 000; Referee: Cambi

9 January 1949 20	Milan	4–1	AS Bari	Milan
	Burini 16'; Santagostino 55', 68'; Carapellese 84'		3' Cavone	Stadium: Arena Civica; Attendance: 25 000; Referee: Boffardi

16 January 1949 21	Milan	2–1	Palermo	Milan
	Antonini 36' Santagostino 43'		22' Pavesi	Stadium: Arena Civica; Attendance: 30 000; Referee: Zambotto

23 January 1949 22	Atalanta	1–1	Milan	Bergamo
	Astorri 42'		86' Carapellese	Stadium: Comunale; Attendance: 22 000; Referee: Bernardi

27 January 1949 18	Milan	3–2	Pro Patria	Milan
	Carapellese 47', 66'; Nordahl 50'		13' Turconi II; 62' Borra	Stadium: Arena Civica; Attendance: 25 000; Referee: Canavesio
Note: Match rescheduled from 2 January 1949.

30 January 1949 23	Milan	3–0	AS Roma	Milan
	Annovazzi 10'; Sloan 23'; Burini 89'			Stadium: San Siro; Attendance: 25 000; Referee: Pieri

6 February 1949 24	Inter	4–4	Milan	Milan
	Gratton 27' (o.g.); Nyers II 33', 71'; Lorenzi 66'		2' Annovazzi; 34' Sloan; 43', 52' Nordahl	Stadium: San Siro; Attendance: 51,000; Referee: Dattilo

13 February 1949 25	Triestina	1–3	Milan	Trieste
	Rossetti 4'		11' Sloan; 32' Burini; 77' Nordahl	Stadium: Comunale; Attendance: 17 000; Referee: Bellè

20 February 1949 26	Milan	4–0	Lucchese	Milan
	Nordahl 5', 59'; Carapellese 43', 88'			Stadium: San Siro; Attendance: 22 000; Referee: Zilli

6 March 1949 27	Torino	4–1	Milan	Turin
	Ossola 11', 75'; Gabetto 52'; Fadini 71'		46' Burini	Stadium: Stadio Filadelfia; Attendance: 50 000; Referee: Dattilo

13 March 1949 28	Milan	3–1	Fiorentina	Milan
	Manenti 14'; Burini 15'; Carapellese 80'		62' Sperotto	Stadium: San Siro; Attendance: 20 000; Referee: Bertolio

20 March 1949 29	Novara	1–2	Milan	Novara
	Ferraris II 25'		18' Sloan; 42' Nordahl	Stadium: Comunale; Attendance: 16 000; Referee: Gamba

3 April 1949 30	Milan	5–1	Modena	Milan
	Burini 7', 21', 39'; Nordahl 60'; Guðmundsson 76'		34' Sentimenti V	Stadium: San Siro; Attendance: 20 000; Referee: Pieri (Trieste)

10 April 1949 31	Juventus	1–1	Milan	Turin
	Muccinelli 76'		57' Nordahl	Stadium: Comunale; Attendance: 22 000; Referee: Dattilo

17 April 1949 32	Milan	2–0	Padova	Milan
	Nordahl 53', 77'			Stadium: San Siro; Attendance: 15 000; Referee: Savio

20 April 1949 33	Milan	2–2	Genoa	Milan
	Nordahl 25', 28'		34' König; 27' (o.g.) Milanese	Stadium: San Siro; Attendance: 20 000; Referee: Canavesio

30 April 1949 34	SS Lazio	2–3	Milan	Rome
	Flamini 9', 38'		11' Carapellese; 81' Nordahl; 86' Degano	Stadium: Nazionale; Attendance: 25 000; Referee: Scotto

8 May 1949 35	Bologna	3–1	Milan	Bologna
	Mayer 10', 72'; Mezzadri 56'		62' Burini	Stadium: Comunale; Attendance: 18 000; Referee: Bertolio

15 May 1949 36	Milan	2–0	Livorno	Milan
	Burini 6'; Nordahl 51'Marcatori			Stadium: San Siro; Attendance: 12 000; Referee: Bernardi

29 May 1949 37	Pro Patria	3–2	Milan	Busto Arsizio
	Turconi II 11', 86'; Toros 90'		48' Nordahl; 74' Antonini	Stadium: Comunale; Attendance: 12 000; Referee: Gemini

5 June 1949 38	Milan	3–2	Sampdoria	Milan
	Santagostino 8'; Sloan 45', 73'		10' (o.g.) Milanese; 51' Gei	Stadium: San Siro; Attendance: 15 000; Referee: Poggipollini

== Statistics ==
=== Players statistics ===
No.	Pos	Nat	Player	Total		1948-49 Serie A	
No.	Pos	Nat	Player	Apps	Goals	Apps	Goals
	GK	(Italy) ITA	Efrem Milanese	26	-38	26	-38
	DF	(Italy) ITA	Andrea Bonomi	29	0	29	0
	DF	(Italy) ITA	Mario Foglia	30	0	30	0
	DF	(Italy) ITA	Edy Gratton	32	0	32	0
	MF	(Italy) ITA	Carlo Annovazzi	36	3	36	3
	MF	(Italy) ITA	Omero Tognon	38	0	38	0
	FW	(Italy) ITA	Renzo Burini	34	13	34	13
	FW	(Italy) ITA	Riccardo Carapellese	36	17	36	17
	FW	(Republic of Ireland) IRL	Paddy Sloan	30	9	30	9
	FW	(Sweden) SWE	Gunnar Nordahl	15	16	15	16
	FW	(Italy) ITA	Aurelio Santagostino	14	6	14	6
	GK	(Italy) ITA	Giovanni Rossetti	12	-14	12	-14
	MF	(Iceland) ISL	Albert Guðmundsson	14	2	14	2
	MF	(Italy) ITA	Giuseppe Antonini	13	3	13	3
	FW	(Italy) ITA	Franco De Gregori	13	1	13	1
	FW	(Italy) ITA	Elio Onorato	12	4	12	4
	FW	(Uruguay) URU	Héctor Puricelli	11	2	11	2
	FW	(Italy) ITA	Pietro Degano	7	4	7	4
	DF	(Italy) ITA	Gianni Toppan	9	1	9	1
	MF	(Italy) ITA	Michele Manenti	3	1	3	1
	DF	(Italy) ITA	Carlo Belloni	3	0	3	0
	MF	(Italy) ITA	Osvaldo Biancardi	1	0	1	0

- Source: http://calcio-seriea.net/presenze/1948/277/
