= 1951 Latin Cup =

1951 club football tournament

Coppa Latina 1951

Tournament details
- Host country: Italy
- Dates: 20–24 June 1951
- Teams: 4 (from 1 confederation)
- Venue: 1 (in 1 host city)

Final positions
- Champions: Milan (1st title)
- Runners-up: Lille
- Third place: Atlético Madrid
- Fourth place: Sporting CP

Tournament statistics
- Matches played: 5
- Goals scored: 26 (5.2 per match)
- Top scorers: (France) André Strappe; (5 goals)

The 1951 Latin Cup (Italian: Coppa Latina 1951) was the third edition of the annual Latin Cup which was played by clubs of the Southwest European nations of France, Italy, Portugal, and Spain. The tournament was hosted by Italy, and the Italian club Milan was the winner of the tournament after defeating Lille by a score of 5–0 in the final match.

== Participating teams ==
Team	Method of qualification	Previous appearances
Lille	1950–51 French Division 1 runners-up (Note: OGC Nice declined participation in the tournament due to the Copa Rio.)	Debut
Milan	1950–51 Serie A champions	Debut
Sporting CP	1950–51 Primeira Divisão champions	1949
Atlético Madrid	1950–51 La Liga champions	1950

== Venues ==
The host of the tournament was Italy, and all matches were played in one host stadium.

Milan	1951 Latin Cup is located in Italy
Stadio Giuseppe Meazza	1951 Latin Cup is located in Italy
Capacity: 37,500	1951 Latin Cup is located in Italy
Stadio Giuseppe Meazza	1951 Latin Cup is located in Italy

== Tournament ==
=== Bracket ===
Semifinals
20 June – Milan
Milan	4
Atlético Madrid	1
21/22 June – Milan
Lille (a.e.t.)	1/6
Sporting CP	1/4

Final
24 June – Milan
Milan	5
Lille	0
Third place match
24 June – Milan
Atlético Madrid	3
Sporting CP	1

=== Semifinals ===
20 June 1951

Milan	4–1	Atlético Madrid
Renosto 17', 55', 75'; Nordahl 19'		Carlsson 70'

Stadio Giuseppe Meazza, Milan, Italy
Attendance: 35,000
Referee: León Boes (France)

21 June 1951

Lille	1–1 (a.e.t.)	Sporting CP
Jensen 37'		Vasques 56'

Stadio Giuseppe Meazza, Milan, Italy
Referee: Manuel Asensi Martín (Spain)

Semifinal replay

22 June 1951

Lille	6–4 (a.e.t.)	Sporting CP
Strappe 5', 45', 49', 54', 97'; Tempowski 92'		Vasques 27', 53', 76'; Caldeira 65'

Stadio Giuseppe Meazza, Milan, Italy
Referee: Manuel Asensi Martín (Spain)

=== Third place match ===
24 June 1951

Atlético Madrid	3–1	Sporting CP
Carlsson 13'; Mascaró 73'; Payá 89'		Travassos 8'

Stadio Giuseppe Meazza, Milan, Italy
Referee: Giuseppe Carpani (Italy)

=== Final ===
24 June 1951

Milan	5–0	Lille
Nordahl 32', 57', 67'; Burini 40'; Annovazzi 70'

Stadio Giuseppe Meazza, Milan, Italy
Referee: Eugen Scherz (Switzerland)

Milan	Lille

GK	(Italy) Lorenzo Buffon
DF	(Italy) Andrea Bonomi
DF	(Italy) Arturo Silvestri
MF	(Sweden) Nils Liedholm
MF	(Italy) Benigno De Grandi
MF	(Italy) Carlo Annovazzi
MF	(Italy) Omero Tognon
MF	(Italy) Albano Vicariotto
FW	(Italy) Renzo Burini
FW	(Sweden) Gunnar Gren
FW	(Sweden) Gunnar Nordahl
Manager:
(Hungary) Lajos Czeizler

GK	(France) Pierre Angel
DF	(France) Jacques Van Cappellen
DF	(Netherlands) Cor van der Hart
DF	(France) Guy Poitevin
DF	(France) Marceau Somerlinck
MF	(France) Albert Dubreucq
MF	(France) Jean Vincent
FW	Erik Jensen
FW	(France) Jean Lechantre
FW	(France) Bolek Tempowski
FW	(France) André Strappe
Manager:
(France) André Cheuva

1951 Latin Cup Champions
(Italy)
Milan
1st title

== Goalscorers ==
Rank	Player	Team	Goals
1	(France) André Strappe	(France) Lille	5
2	(Portugal) Manuel Vasques	(Portugal) Sporting CP	4
2	(Sweden) Gunnar Nordahl	(Italy) Milan	4
3	(Italy) Mario Renosto	(Italy) Milan	3
4	(Sweden) Henry Carlsson	(Spain) Atlético Madrid	2
5	(Spain) Pedro Mascaró	(Spain) Atlético Madrid	1
5	(Spain) Pérez Payá	(Spain) Atlético Madrid	1
5	(France) Boleslaw Tempowski	(France) Lille	1
5	(Denmark) Erik Jensen	(France) Lille	1
5	(Italy) Renzo Burini	(Italy) Milan	1
5	(Italy) Carlo Annovazzi	(Italy) Milan	1
5	(Portugal) Manuel Caldeira	(Portugal) Sporting CP	1
5	(Portugal) José Travassos	(Portugal) Sporting CP	1

== See also ==
- 1951 Zentropa Cup, a similar competition
