= Pietro Grosso =

Italian footballer

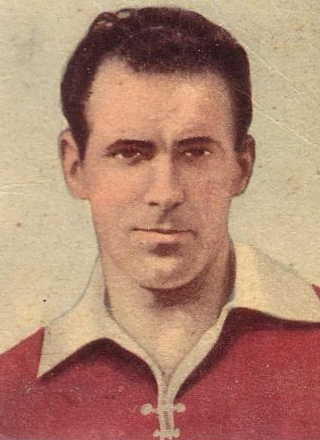

Personal information
- Date of birth: 23 December 1923
- Place of birth: Roncade, Kingdom of Italy
- Date of death: 3 October 1957 (aged 33)
- Height: 1.79 m (5 ft 10 1/2 in)
- Position: Midfielder

Senior career*
Years	Team	Apps	(Gls)
1941–1946	Treviso		
1946–1948	Vicenza	71	(0)
1948–1951	Triestina	99	(1)
1951–1952	Milan	32	(0)
1952–1954	Roma	55	(0)
1954–1957	Torino	80	(0)
1957	Brescia	2	(0)

International career
1951–1953	Italy	3	(0)
- * Club domestic league appearances and goals

Pietro Grosso (Italian pronunciation: [ˈpjɛːtro ˈɡrɔsso]; 23 December 1923 – 3 October 1957) was an Italian professional footballer who played as a midfielder.

== Club career ==
Gross played for 11 seasons (337 games, 1 goal) in the Italian Serie A with Vicenza Calcio, U.S. Triestina Calcio, A.C. Milan, A.S. Roma and A.C. Torino.

== International career ==
Gross made his Italy national football team debut on 25 November 1951 in a game against Switzerland.
