= Manuel Caldeira =

Portuguese footballer

Personal information
- Full name: Manuel António Caldeira
- Date of birth: 14 December 1926
- Place of birth: Vila Real de Santo António, Portugal
- Date of death: 9 August 2014 (aged 87)
- Place of death: Faro, Portugal
- Position: Defender

Youth career
- Lusitano

Senior career*
Years	Team	Apps	(Gls)
1944–1950	Lusitano	73	(1)
1950–1959	Sporting CP	179	(0)
1959–1961	Portimonense		
1961–1962	Silves		

International career
1954–1955	Portugal	3	(0)
- * Club domestic league appearances and goals

Manuel António Caldeira (14 December 1926 – 9 August 2014) was a Portuguese footballer who played as a defender.

== Club career ==
Caldeira was born in Vila Real de Santo António, Algarve. He spent nine years of his senior career with Sporting CP after signing from local club Lusitano FC, winning five Primeira Liga championships – four consecutive – and the 1954 edition of the Taça de Portugal.

== International career ==
Over a five-month period, Caldeira earned three caps for Portugal. He made his debut on 19 December 1954 against West Germany, a 3–0 friendly defeat in Lisbon.

== Death ==
Caldeira died on 9 August 2014 in Faro, at the age of 87.
