= Riccardo Carapellese =

Italian footballer and manager

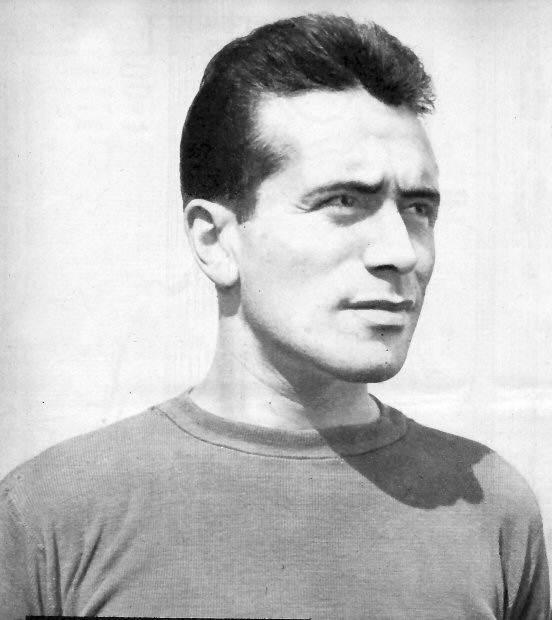

Personal information
- Date of birth: 1 July 1922
- Place of birth: Cerignola, Italy
- Date of death: 20 October 1995 (aged 73)
- Place of death: Rapallo, Italy
- Position: Striker

Youth career
- 1930–1934: Caligaris
- 1934–1936: Torino
- 1936–1937: Saluggia
- 1937–1938: Barcanova
- 1938–1939: Torino

Senior career*
Years	Team	Apps	(Gls)
1942–1943	Spezia	19	(3)
1945–1946	Como	16	(3)
1946–1949	Milan	106	(52)
1949–1952	Torino	98	(28)
1952–1953	Juventus	20	(9)
1953–1957	Genoa	94	(22)
1957–1959	Catania	30	(9)
1960–1961	Vigevano	0	(0)
1961–1962	Ternana	3	(0)

International career
1947–1956	Italy	16	(10)
- * Club domestic league appearances and goals

Riccardo Carapellese (Italian pronunciation: [rikˈkardo karapelˈleːze; -eːse]; 1 July 1922 – 20 October 1995) was an Italian football manager and player who played as a striker.

== Club career ==
Carapellese started his career in the 1942–43 season with Spezia in Serie B where he played 19 games and scored 3 goals. After a stint with Como, he debuted in Serie A with Milan, in which he remained until 1949 and gained a place in the national team. In the 1949–50 season, after the Grande Torino Superga tragedy, he was acquired by Torino, inheriting the captain's armband from Valentino Mazzola.

In 1952 he moved to Torino's cross-city rivals Juventus, playing for the Bianconeri for only a season, after which he went to Genoa. In 1957 he returned to Serie B with Catania where he ended his career in 1959. In total, he played 318 matches throughout his career and scored 111 goals.

== International career ==
With the Italy national football team, Carapellese made his debut in November 1947 in a 5–1 away defeat against Austria, scoring the only goal of the match for Italy. He participated at the 1950 FIFA World Cup as Italy's captain, scoring two goals in his nation's matches with Sweden and Paraguay.

Appearances and goals by national team and year
National team	Year	Apps	Goals
Italy	1947	2	2
Italy	1948	2	2
Italy	1949	5	3
Italy	1950	4	2
Italy	1952	1	0
Italy	1956	2	1
Total		16	10

Scores and results list Italy's goal tally first, score column indicates score after each Carapellese goal.

List of international goals scored by Riccardo Carapellese
No.	Date	Venue	Opponent	Score	Result	Competition	Ref.
1	9 November 1947	Praterstadion, Vienna, Austria	Austria	1-5	1-5	Friendly	
2	14 December 1947	Stadio San Nicola, Bari, Italy	Yugoslavia	3-0	3-1	Friendly	
3	4 April 1948	Stade Yves-du-Manoir, Colombes, France	France	1-0	3-1	Friendly	
4	4 April 1948	Stade Yves-du-Manoir, Colombes, France	France	3-0	3-1	Friendly	
5	27 February 1949	Stadio Luigi Ferraris, Genoa, Italy	Portugal	2-1	4-1	Friendly	
6	27 March 1949	Estadio Chamartín, Madrid, Spain	Spain	2-1	3-1	Friendly	
7	12 June 1949	Megyeri úti Stadion, Budapest, Hungary	Hungary	1-0	1-1	1948–53 Central European International Cup	
8	25 June 1950	Pacaembu Stadium, São Paulo, Brazil	Sweden	1-0	2-3	1950 FIFA World Cup	
9	2 July 1950	Pacaembu Stadium, São Paulo, Brazil	Paraguay	1-0	2-0	1950 FIFA World Cup	
10	15 February 1956	Stadio Comunale, Bologna, Italy	France	1-0	2-0	Friendly	

== Personal life ==
Carapellese was born in Cerignola, province of Foggia. He died in Rapallo in 1995 at 73 years of age.

Sporting positions
Preceded by Valentino Mazzola	Italy captain 1949–1950	Succeeded by Carlo Annovazzi
