= Raoul Bortoletto =

Italian footballer (1925–2003)

Personal information
- Date of birth: 9 May 1925
- Place of birth: Treviso, Kingdom of Italy
- Date of death: 4 January 2003 (aged 77)
- Place of death: Treviso, Italy
- Height: 1.86 m (6 ft 1 in)
- Position: Midfielder

Senior career*
Years	Team	Apps	(Gls)
1941–1946	Treviso		
1946–1948	Fiorentina	25	(1)
1948–1950	Empoli	77	(6)
1950–1951	Lucchese	34	(0)
1951–1956	Roma	129	(10)
1956–1957	Cagliari	16	(1)
1957–1960	Vittorio Veneto		

International career
1953	Italy	1	(0)
- * Club domestic league appearances and goals

Raoul Bortoletto (Italian pronunciation: [ˈraul bortoˈletto]; 9 May 1925 – 4 January 2003) was an Italian professional footballer who played as a midfielder.

== Club career ==
Bortoletto played for 7 seasons (162 games, 10 goals) in the Serie A for ACF Fiorentina, A.S. Lucchese Libertas 1905 and A.S. Roma.

== International career ==
Bortoletto played his only Italy national football team game on 17 May 1953 against Hungary.

== Personal life ==
His older brother Piero Bortoletto also played football professionally. To distinguish them, Piero was referred to as Bortoletto I and Raoul as Bortoletto II.
