= Svend Hansen (footballer, born 1922) =

Danish footballer (1922–2006)

Personal information
- Date of birth: 17 September 1922
- Date of death: 7 May 2006 (aged 83)
- Position: Forward

Senior career*
Years	Team	Apps	(Gls)
–1950	Odense BK		
1950–1952	Atalanta	70	(13)
1952–1953	Aurora Pro Patria	12	(0)

International career
1942–1949	Denmark	2	(1)
- * Club domestic league appearances and goals

Svend Hansen (17 September 1922 – 7 May 2006) was a Danish footballer who played as a forward. He made two appearances for the Denmark national team from 1942 to 1949.
