= Sigvard Löfgren =

Swedish footballer

Sigvard "Sigge" Löfgren
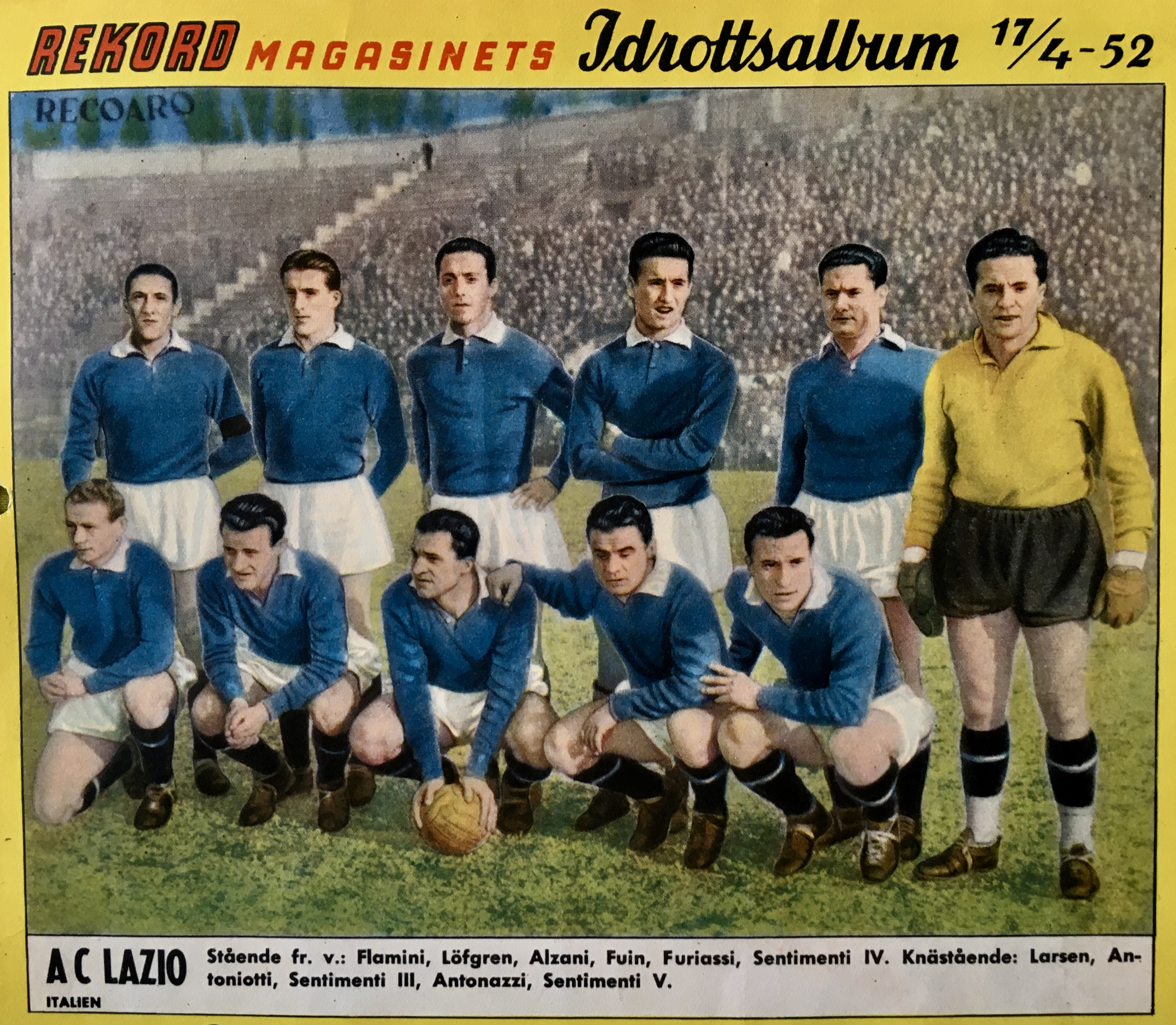
- A line-up of S.S. Lazio in the 1951–1952 season. From left to right, standing: Flamini, Sigvard "Sigge" Löfgren, Alzani, Fuin, Furiassi, Sentimenti IV; crouched: Ragnar Larsen, Antoniotti, Sentimenti III, Antonazzi and Sentimenti V.

Personal information
- Full name: Sigvard Löfgren
- Date of birth: 12 April 1928
- Place of birth: Ronneby, Sweden
- Date of death: 21 April 1996 (aged 68)
- Place of death: Unknown
- Height: 1.83 m (6 ft 0 in)
- Position: Midfielder

Youth career
- 1941-1950: Ronneby BK

Senior career*
Years	Team	Apps	(Gls)
1950–1952	Helsingborgs IF	7	(7)
1951–1955	Lazio	62	(37)
1955–1956	SPAL	23	(9)
1956-1962	Ronneby BK		
1963-1967	Saltö BK		

International career
1951	Sweden	1	(0)
- * Club domestic league appearances and goals

Sigvard "Sigge" Löfgren (12 April 1928 – 21 April 1996), also known as Sigfrid Löfgren, was a Swedish footballer who played as a midfielder.

== Club career ==
Löfgren started his career with Swedish Allsvenskan side Helsingborg in 1950, and garnered a reputation of being one of the best athletes in Swedish football. He moved to Italy in 1951, and was being scouted by numerous clubs before joining Lazio. After a good first season, in which he scored 7 goals from 20 games, he suffered a serious injury which kept him out of the whole 1952–53 season.

On his return from injury, Löfgren could never recapture the form he showed in his first season, and in 1955 he joined fellow Serie A side Società Polisportiva Ars et Labor, where he stayed for one season before returning to his homeland to join local side Ronneby BK.

== International career ==
Löfgren's only senior international cup came in a 1951 friendly draw with Spain.
