= Gunnar Gren =

Swedish footballer (1920–1991)

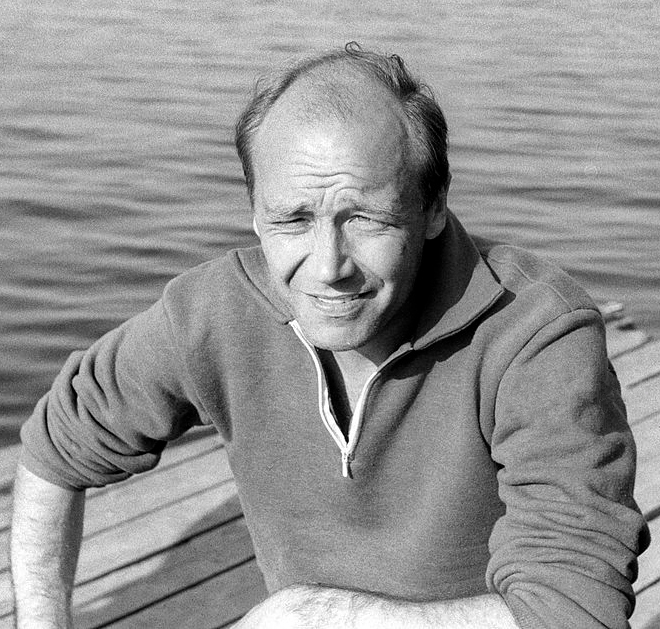
- Gren during the 1958 FIFA World Cup in Sweden

Personal information
- Full name: Johan Gunnar Gren
- Date of birth: 31 October 1920
- Place of birth: Gothenburg, Sweden
- Date of death: 10 November 1991 (aged 71)
- Place of death: Gothenburg, Sweden
- Height: 1.75 m (5 ft 9 in)
- Positions: Forward; attacking midfielder

Youth career
- Silverkällan
- Strix
- Lindholmen

Senior career*
| Years | Team | Apps | (Gls) |
| 1937–1940 | Gårda BK | 54 | (16) |
| 1941–1949 | IFK Göteborg | 168 | (79) |
| 1949–1953 | AC Milan | 133 | (38) |
| 1953–1955 | Fiorentina | 55 | (5) |
| 1955–1956 | Genoa | 29 | (2) |
| 1956–1957 | Örgryte | 4 | (0) |
| 1963–1964 | GAIS | 22 | (2) |
| 1976 | Oddevold | 1 | (0) |
| Total | | 466 | (142) |

International career
| 1939–1956 | Sweden B | 2 | (0) |
| 1940–1958 | Sweden | 57 | (32) |

Managerial career
- 1952: A.C. Milan
- 1956–1959: Örgryte
- 1960: IFK Göteborg
- 1963–1964: GAIS
- 1965–1966: Värnamo
- 1967: Redbergslid
- 1968–1969: GAIS
- 1970: Skogen
- 1973: Fässberg
- 1976: Oddevold
Medal record
Men's Football
Representing Sweden
Olympic Games
| Gold medal – first place | 1948 London |
FIFA World Cup
| Runner-up | 1958 Sweden |
- * Club domestic league appearances and goals

Johan Gunnar Gren (pronounced [ˈɡɵ̌nːar ˈɡreːn]; 31 October 1920 – 10 November 1991) was a Swedish professional football player and coach. He is best remembered for playing for IFK Göteborg and AC Milan.

A creative forward, known for his technical skill, vision, tactical intelligence, and passing ability as a playmaker, he was part of the famous "Gre-No-Li" trio of forwards at Milan and the Sweden national team. He was also capable of playing as an attacking midfielder, as an offensive–minded central midfielder, known as the mezzala role in Italian football jargon, or even as a striker.

A full international between 1940 and 1958, he won 57 caps and scored 32 goals for the Sweden men's national team. He was a part of the Sweden team that won gold at the 1948 Summer Olympics, as well as the team that finished second at the 1958 FIFA World Cup. In 1946, he was awarded Guldbollen as Sweden's best footballer of the year. Gren is considered to be one of Sweden's greatest and most prolific football players; a statue has been erected in his honor outside Gamla Ullevi stadium.

== Early years ==
Gren was born on 31 October 1920 to parents Johan Olsson and Gerda Maria Olsson. Gren, a son of a carpenter, grew up in Majorna, Gothenburg. From a young age, Gren excelled in football. On 7 October 1934, Gothenburg Football Association President Carl 'Ceve' Linde held a juggling contest. He won his first sporting prize – a bronze plaque. Göteborgs Sport Bladet wrote about 13-year-old Gren's skills and how he outshone some of the big boys in the national league. The then-13-year-old Gren played for Strix. During his youth, he played for Lindholmen and GAIK, before playing for Gårda.

== Club career ==
=== Gårda ===
In 1937, Gren started playing for Gårda BK. He made his Allsvenskan debut on 1 May 1938 against Malmö FF, which resulted in a scoreless draw. During his time there, he played a total of 54 matches, scoring 16 goals.

=== IFK Göteborg ===
In 1941, he was recruited by IFK Gothenburg. During his time in the club, Gren won one national championships in the 1941/42 season and was top scorer in 1947. He won the first ever Guldbollen in 1946. His first league match for IFK was in August 1941, when Gothenburg played against Gårda, winning 6–1 with Gren scoring the first goal. His last league game for Gothenburg was on 6 June 1949 versus Norrköping at Gamla Ullevi in which Gothenburg lost 1–0. He had played 164 matches for Gothenburg and scored 78 goals.

=== AC Milan ===
On 11 September 1949, he debuted for A.C. Milan against Sampdoria, with Milan winning 3–1. During his time with Milan, he became the 'Gre' part of the famous Gre-No-Li trio with his Swedish teammates Gunnar Nordahl ('No') and Nils Liedholm ('Li'). He also earned the nickname the "Il Professore" which is Italian for "the professor". While at A.C. Milan, he won the league title for the 1950–51 season. He made 133 appearances in Serie A and scored 38 goals. Gren also managed Milan in 1952, before moving to Fiorentina.

=== Later career ===
In 1953, Gren moved to Fiorentina, where he made 55 appearances and scored five goals. Then in 1955, Gren moved to Genoa where he made 29 appearances and two goals. Tired of Italy, Gren decided to move back to Sweden. In 1956, Gren returned to Gothenburg, where he joined Örgryte as both player and manager. Gren left in 1959 and played for GAIS in 1963.

== International career ==
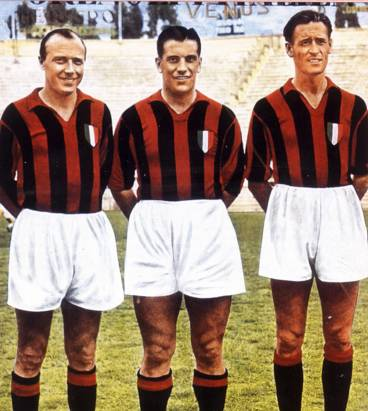
Gre-No-Li playing for A.C. Milan, 1950

Gren made his debut for Sweden on 29 August 1940 in the team's 3–2 win over Finland. During the next decade he played 40 matches for the national team, ending in 1949 with 3–1 against Ireland in a World Cup qualifier and 2–2 in a friendly against Hungary. During this era Gren was part of the team that won the gold medal in the 1948 Olympics in London, scoring twice against Yugoslavia in the final on Wembley.

As a professional, Gren was suspended from Sweden men's national team. However, the World Cup of 1958 would be in play on home soil and the Sweden national team seemed too weak for the competition, the Swedish Football Association changed this rule, and Gren, having now ended his professional career and playing in the Swedish Division 2, was again eligible. Gren went on to be the second oldest player of this World Cup, 37 years old, and played an important role in the silver medal-winning Swedish team. He played five matches during the World Cup and scored one goal, 2–1 against West Germany in the semi-final.

Gren's last cap came on 26 October 1958 against Denmark in a 4–4 draw. At the time, he was 37 years, 360 days old. In all, Gren made 57 appearances for the national team, scoring 32 goals.

== Managerial career ==
Whilst at A.C. Milan, Gren managed the team in 1952. Also, Gren managed both Örgryte and GAIS as player-manager. After retiring as a player, Gren managed several teams. Gren became the technical director for Juventus for a brief period in 1961. Gren then managed GAIS, Värnamo, Redbergslid, Skogen, Oddevold and Fässberg.

== Retirement ==
Gren retired from football in the 1970s. He died ten days after his 71st birthday, and is buried in Västra Kyrkogården (Western Cemetery), Gothenburg, Västra Götaland, Sweden.

== Career statistics ==
=== Club ===
Appearances and goals by club, season and competition
| Club | Season | League | | | Cup (Note: Includes Svenska Cupen) | | Continental | | Other (Note: Includes Latin Cup) | | Total | |
| Club | Season | Division | Apps | Goals | Apps | Goals | Apps | Goals | Apps | Goals | Apps | Goals |
|---|---|---|---|---|---|---|---|---|---|---|---|---|
| Gårda BK | 1936–37 | Allsvenskan | 1 | 0 | | | – | | – | | | |
| Gårda BK | 1937–38 | Allsvenskan | 22 | 4 | | | – | | – | | | |
| Gårda BK | 1938–39 | Allsvenskan | 22 | 8 | | | – | | – | | | |
| Gårda BK | 1939–40 | Allsvenskan | 9 | 4 | | | – | | – | | | |
| Gårda BK | Total | | 54 | 16 | | | – | | – | | | |
| IFK Göteborg | 1940–41 | Allsvenskan | 0 | 0 | 0 | 0 | – | | – | | 0 | 0 |
| IFK Göteborg | 1941–42 | Allsvenskan | 22 | 10 | 2 | 1 | – | | – | | 24 | 11 |
| IFK Göteborg | 1942–43 | Allsvenskan | 22 | 9 | 1 | 0 | – | | – | | 23 | 9 |
| IFK Göteborg | 1943–44 | Allsvenskan | 21 | 11 | 0 | 0 | – | | – | | 21 | 11 |
| IFK Göteborg | 1944–45 | Allsvenskan | 16 | 8 | 2 | 0 | – | | – | | 18 | 8 |
| IFK Göteborg | 1945–46 | Allsvenskan | 19 | 13 | 3 | 3 | – | | – | | 22 | 16 |
| IFK Göteborg | 1946–47 | Allsvenskan | 20 | 18 | 1 | 0 | – | | – | | 21 | 18 |
| IFK Göteborg | 1947–48 | Allsvenskan | 22 | 8 | 0 | 0 | – | | – | | 22 | 8 |
| IFK Göteborg | 1948–49 | Allsvenskan | 22 | 1 | 0 | 0 | – | | – | | 22 | 1 |
| IFK Göteborg | Total | | 164 | 78 | 9 | 4 | – | | – | | 173 | 82 |
| AC Milan | 1949–50 | Serie A | 37 | 18 | | | | | | | | |
| AC Milan | 1950–51 | Serie A | 36 | 9 | | | | | 4 | 0 | | |
| AC Milan | 1951–52 | Serie A | 31 | 7 | | | | | | | | |
| AC Milan | 1952–53 | Serie A | 29 | 4 | | | | | | | | |
| AC Milan | Total | | 133 | 38 | | | | | | | | |
| Fiorentina | 1953–54 | Serie A | 33 | 2 | | | | | | | | |
| Fiorentina | 1954–55 | Serie A | 23 | 2 | | | | | | | | |
| Fiorentina | Total | | 56 | 4 | | | | | | | | |
| Genoa | 1955–56 | Serie A | 32 | 23 | | | | | | | | |
| Örgryte | 1956–57 | Division 2 Västra Götaland | | | | | – | | – | | | |
| Örgryte | 1957–58 | Division 2 Västra Götaland | | | | | – | | – | | | |
| Örgryte | 1959 | Allsvenskan | | | | | – | | – | | | |
| Örgryte | Total | | 4 | 0 | | | | | | | | |
| GAIS | 1963 | Division 2 Västra Götaland | 20 | 2 | | | – | | – | | | |
| GAIS | 1964 | Allsvenskan | 2 | 0 | | | | | | | | |
| Oddevold | 1976 | Division 4 Bohuslän-Dalsland | 1 | 0 | | | – | | – | | | |
| Career totals | | | 466 | 142 | | | | | | | | |

=== International ===
Appearances and goals by national team and year
| National team | Year | Apps | Goals |
|---|---|---|---|
| Sweden | 1940 | 3 | 1 |
| Sweden | 1941 | 1 | 0 |
| Sweden | 1942 | 4 | 1 |
| Sweden | 1943 | 4 | 1 |
| Sweden | 1944 | 0 | 0 |
| Sweden | 1945 | 6 | 5 |
| Sweden | 1946 | 4 | 7 |
| Sweden | 1947 | 6 | 3 |
| Sweden | 1948 | 9 | 6 |
| Sweden | 1949 | 3 | 1 |
| Sweden | 1950 | 0 | 0 |
| Sweden | 1951 | 0 | 0 |
| Sweden | 1952 | 0 | 0 |
| Sweden | 1953 | 0 | 0 |
| Sweden | 1954 | 0 | 0 |
| Sweden | 1955 | 0 | 0 |
| Sweden | 1956 | 0 | 0 |
| Sweden | 1957 | 8 | 4 |
| Sweden | 1958 | 9 | 3 |
| Total | | 57 | 32 |

Scores and results list Sweden's goal tally first, score column indicates score after each Gren goal.

List of international goals scored by Gunnar Gren
| No. | Date | Venue | Opponent | Score | Result | Competition | Ref. |
|---|---|---|---|---|---|---|---|
| 1 | 22 September 1940 | Råsunda, Solna, Sweden | Finland | 5–0 | 5–0 | Friendly | |
| 2 | 4 October 1942 | Råsunda, Solna, Sweden | Denmark | 1–0 | 2–1 | Friendly | |
| 3 | 20 June 1943 | Parken, Copenhagen, Denmark | Denmark | 1–1 | 2–3 | Friendly | |
| 4 | 1 July 1945 | Parken, Copenhagen, Denmark | Denmark | 4–3 | 4–3 | Friendly | |
| 5 | 26 August 1945 | Ullevi, Gothenburg, Sweden | Finland | 2–0 | 7–2 | Friendly | |
| 6 | 26 August 1945 | Ullevi, Gothenburg, Sweden | Finland | 5–2 | 7–2 | Friendly | |
| 7 | 26 August 1945 | Ullevi, Gothenburg, Sweden | Finland | 6–2 | 7–2 | Friendly | |
| 8 | 21 October 1945 | Råsunda, Solna, Sweden | Norway | 7–0 | 10–0 | Friendly | |
| 9 | 23 June 1946 | Parken, Copenhagen, Denmark | Denmark | 1–1 | 1–3 | Friendly | |
| 10 | 7 July 1946 | Råsunda, Solna, Sweden | Switzerland | 1–1 | 7–2 | Friendly | |
| 11 | 7 July 1946 | Råsunda, Solna, Sweden | Switzerland | 3–1 | 7–2 | Friendly | |
| 12 | 7 July 1946 | Råsunda, Solna, Sweden | Switzerland | 4–2 | 7–2 | Friendly | |
| 13 | 7 July 1946 | Råsunda, Solna, Sweden | Switzerland | 6–2 | 7–2 | Friendly | |
| 14 | 15 September 1946 | Ullevaal, Oslo, Norway | Norway | 2–0 | 3–0 | Friendly | |
| 15 | 6 October 1946 | Ullevi, Gothenburg, Sweden | Denmark | 1–0 | 3–3 | Friendly | |
| 16 | 24 August 1947 | Ryavallen, Örebro, Sweden | Finland | 3–0 | 7–0 | Friendly | |
| 17 | 5 October 1947 | Råsunda, Solna, Sweden | Norway | 1–0 | 4–1 | Friendly | |
| 18 | 19 November 1947 | Highbury, London, England | England | 2–3 | 2–4 | Friendly | |
| 19 | 11 July 1948 | Råsunda, Solna, Sweden | Austria | 2–1 | 3–2 | Friendly | |
| 20 | 11 July 1948 | Råsunda, Solna, Sweden | Austria | 3–2 | 3–2 | Friendly | |
| 21 | 5 August 1948 | Selhurst Park, London, England | South Korea | 3–0 | 12–0 | 1948 Summer Olympics | |
| 22 | 13 August 1948 | Wembley Stadium, London, England | Yugoslavia | 1–0 | 3–1 | 1948 Summer Olympics | |
| 23 | 13 August 1948 | Wembley Stadium, London, England | Yugoslavia | 3–1 | 3–1 | 1948 Summer Olympics | |
| 24 | 14 November 1948 | Praterstadion, Vienna, Austria | Austria | 1–2 | 1–2 | Friendly | |
| 25 | 19 June 1949 | Råsunda, Solna, Sweden | Hungary | 2–2 | 2–2 | Friendly | |
| 26 | 22 September 1957 | Råsunda, Solna, Sweden | Finland | 1–0 | 5–1 | 1956–59 Nordic Football Championship | |
| 27 | 22 September 1957 | Råsunda, Solna, Sweden | Finland | 2–0 | 5–1 | 1956–59 Nordic Football Championship | |
| 28 | 22 September 1957 | Råsunda, Solna, Sweden | Finland | 5–1 | 5–1 | 1956–59 Nordic Football Championship | |
| 29 | 13 October 1957 | Råsunda, Solna, Sweden | Norway | 5–2 | 5–2 | 1956–59 Nordic Football Championship | |
| 30 | 24 June 1958 | Ullevi, Gothenburg, Sweden | West Germany | 2–1 | 3–1 | 1958 FIFA World Cup | |
| 31 | 26 October 1958 | Råsunda, Solna, Sweden | Denmark | 3–2 | 4–4 | 1956–59 Nordic Football Championship | |
| 32 | 26 October 1958 | Råsunda, Solna, Sweden | Denmark | 4–3 | 4–4 | 1956–59 Nordic Football Championship | |

== Honours ==
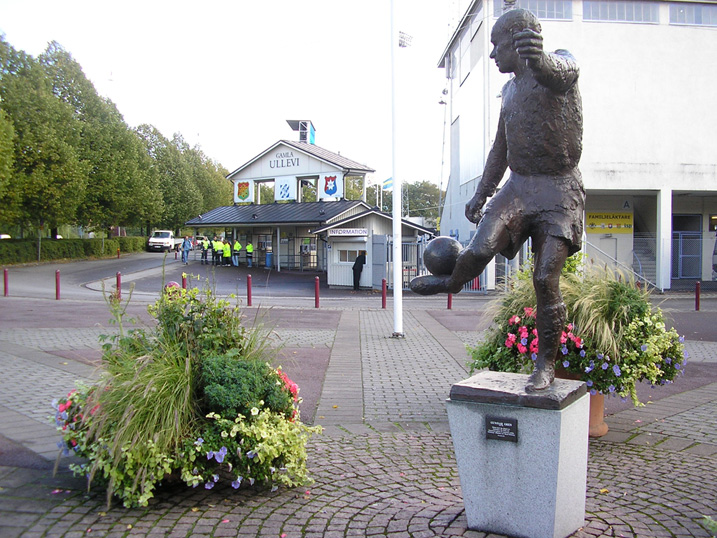
Statue of Gunnar Gren outside of (the now demolished and rebuilt) Gamla Ullevi stadium.

IFK Göteborg

- Allsvenskan: 1941–42

A.C. Milan

- Serie A: 1950–51
- Latin Cup: 1950–51

Sweden

- FIFA World Cup runner-up: 1958
- Summer Olympics: 1948
- Nordic Football Championship: 1937–47, 1948–51, 1956–59

Individual

- Guldbollen: 1946
- Allsvenskan top scorer: 1946–47
- Goteborg Football Association Juggling Award: 1934
- Serie A Team of The Year: 1951, 1952, 1953, 1954
- FIFA World Cup All-Star Team: 1958
- Venerdì's 100 Magnifici
- A.C. Milan Hall of Fame
