= Gianni Toppan =

Italian footballer

Personal information
- Full name: Giovanni Toppan
- Date of birth: 8 November 1920
- Place of birth: Sequals, Italy
- Date of death: 1 February 1987 (aged 66)
- Place of death: Milan, Italy
- Height: 1.74 m (5 ft 9 in)
- Position: Midfielder

Senior career*
| Years | Team | Apps | (Gls) |
- Falck
| 1940–1949 | Milan | 141 | (1) |
- * Club domestic league appearances and goals

Giovanni "Gianni" Toppan (8 November 1920 – 1 February 1987) was an Italian professional footballer, who played as a midfielder.
