= Mario Renosto =

Italian footballer

Personal information
- Date of birth: 15 June 1929
- Place of birth: Venice, Italy
- Date of death: 14 November 1988 (aged 59)
- Position: Midfielder

Senior career*
| Years | Team | Apps | (Gls) |
| 1945–1950 | Venezia | 100 | (20) |
| 1950–1952 | Milan | 43 | (14) |
| 1952–1954 | Roma | 15 | (2) |
| 1954–1955 | Novara | 8 | (2) |
| 1955–1958 | Triestina | 29 | (5) |
| 1958–1959 | Messina | 22 | (3) |
- * Club domestic league appearances and goals

Mario Renosto (15 June 1929 in Venice – 14 November 1988) was an Italian professional footballer who played as a midfielder.

He played for 9 seasons (121 games, 30 goals) in the Serie A for S.S.C. Venezia, A.C. Milan, A.S. Roma, Novara Calcio and U.S. Triestina Calcio.

His older brother Giacinto Renosto also played football professionally. To distinguish them, Giacinto was referred to as Renosto I and Mario as Renosto II.

== Honours ==
Milan

- Serie A champion: 1950–51.
