= Omero Tognon =

Italian footballer and manager

Personal information
- Full name: Omero Tognon
- Date of birth: 3 March 1924
- Place of birth: Padua, Italy
- Date of death: 23 August 1990 (aged 66)
- Height: 1.68 m (5 ft 6 in)
- Position: Midfielder

Senior career*
Years	Team	Apps	(Gls)
1945–1956	Milan	335	(2)
1956–1957	Pordenone		

International career
1949–1954	Italy	14	(0)

Managerial career
- 1965–1966: Hellas Verona
- * Club domestic league appearances and goals

Omero Tognon (Italian pronunciation: [oˈmɛːro toɲˈɲon], Venetian: [toˈɲoŋ]; 3 March 1924 – 23 August 1990) was an Italian footballer who played as a central midfielder. He was mainly known for his physical power and his exemplary correct behaviour on the pitch, and never once received a caution during his eleven-year spell with Milan.

== Club career ==
Born in Padua, Tognon was a central midfielder who played for Milan during the 1940s and 1950s. Tognon played eleven seasons with Milan making 335 appearances preceded only by Gianni Rivera, Paolo Maldini, Franco Baresi, Billy Costacurta, Mauro Tassotti, Nils Liedholm and Cesare Maldini. He formed a tandem in midfield with Carlo Annovazzi. With Milan he won two championships, the first in 1951 having played 37 of 38 games, and the second in 1955 without playing any games; he served as the club's captain between 1953 and 1956. He later also spent a season with Pordenone before retiring in 1957.

== International career ==
Tognon was selected to the national team for the 1950 World Cup but, along with Emilio Caprile, Giuseppe Casari and Benito Lorenzi, he saw no action at the tournament. He would get another opportunity at the 1954 World Cup where he was immovable at in the centre of the team's defence. The second game against Switzerland was his last cap for the 'Azzurri'.

== Honours ==
=== Player ===
Milan

- Serie A: 1950–51, 1954–55
- Coppa Latina: 1951, 1956

=== Manager ===
Arezzo

- Serie C: 1968–69

=== Individual ===
- A.C. Milan Hall of Fame
- Serie A Team of The Year: 1951, 1954
