= Arturo Silvestri =

Italian footballer and manager (1921–2002)

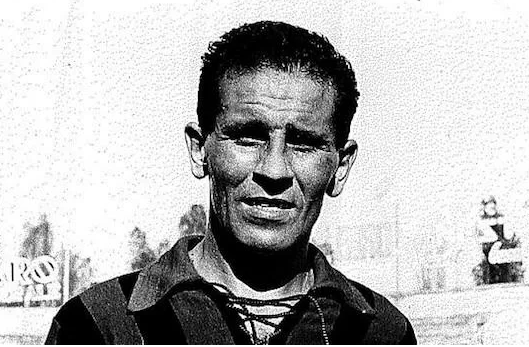
- Silvestri in the 1950s

Personal information
- Date of birth: 14 June 1921
- Place of birth: Fossalta di Piave, Italy
- Date of death: 14 October 2002 (aged 81)
- Place of death: Pisa, Italy
- Position: Right-back

Senior career*
Years	Team	Apps	(Gls)
- Sandonà
	Fiorentina	0	(0)
- Pisa
1947–1950	Modena	107	(8)
1950–1955	A.C. Milan	158	(7)
1955–1956	Verona		

International career
1951	Italy	3	(0)

Managerial career
- 1957–1959: Treviso
- 1959–1961: Livorno
- 1961–1966: Cagliari
- 1966–1967: A.C. Milan
- 1967–1968: Lanerossi Vicenza
- 1968–1970: Brescia
- 1970–1974: Genoa
- Lucchese
- * Club domestic league appearances and goals

Arturo Silvestri (Italian pronunciation: [arˈtuːro silˈvɛstri]; 14 June 1921 – 14 October 2002) was an Italian professional footballer and football manager, who played as a right-back.

== Honours ==
=== Player ===
AC Milan

- Serie A: 1950–51, 1954–55
- Latin Cup: 1951

=== Manager ===
Cagliari

- Serie C: 1961–62 (girone B)

AC Milan

- Coppa Italia: 1966–67

Genoa

- Serie B: 1972–73
- Serie C: 1970–71 (girone B)
