= Andrea Bonomi =

Italian footballer (1923–2003)

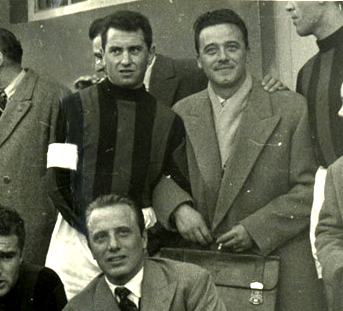
- Andrea Bonomi (on the left) and Ferdinando Valletti

Personal information
- Date of birth: 14 February 1923
- Place of birth: Cassano d'Adda, Italy
- Date of death: 26 November 2003 (aged 80)
- Place of death: Cassano d'Adda, Italy
- Position: Defender

Senior career*
Years	Team	Apps	(Gls)
1941–1942	Pirelli Milano		
1942–1952	Milan	252	(4)
1952–1954	Brescia	47	(0)
1954–1955	Piacenza	5	(0)

International career
1951	Italy	1	(0)
- * Club domestic league appearances and goals

Andrea Bonomi (Italian pronunciation: [anˈdrɛːa boˈnɔːmi]; 14 February 1923 – 26 November 2003) was an Italian footballer who played as a defender.

== Early life ==
Born in Cassano d'Adda, Italy, when Bonomi was six years old, he fell into the Adda River and was about to drown when a 10-year-old boy rescued him. Ironically, his rescuer was Valentino Mazzola, who went on to become one of the greatest Italian football players of all time, captaining the Grande Torino team of the 1940s, which would be killed in the Superga air disaster.

== Club career ==
Bonomi was initially nicknamed Ciapin during his early career. He played for several Italian football clubs, but spent most of his career with A.C. Milan. He served as Milan's captain during the 1950–51 season, which ended with a Serie A triumph for the rossoneri, led by the Gre-No-Li attacking trio.

== International career ==
Bonomi played for the Italy national football team for just one match, in 1951, against Switzerland.

== Style of play ==
A tenacious and dynamic defender, Bonomi usually played as a full-back.

== Honours ==
=== Club ===
Milan

- Serie A: 1950–51

=== Individual ===
- A.C. Milan Hall of Fame

Sporting positions
Preceded by Ettore Puricelli	Milan captain 1948–1952	Succeeded by Carlo Annovazzi
