= Benigno De Grandi =

Italian footballer and manager (1924-2014)

Personal information
- Date of birth: 15 June 1924
- Place of birth: Salsomaggiore Terme, Italy
- Date of death: 11 December 2014 (aged 90)
- Position: Midfielder

Senior career*
Years	Team	Apps	(Gls)
1946–1947	Mantova	0	(0)
1948–1949	Seregno	28	(11)
1949–1951	Milan	42	(3)
1951–1956	Palermo	97	(8)
1954–1955	→ Sampdoria (loan)	0	(0)
Total		167	(22)
- * Club domestic league appearances and goals

Benigno De Grandi (15 June 1924 – 11 December 2014) was an Italian professional football player and manager. He played for Mantova, Seregno, Milan, Palermo and Sampdoria.
