= Renzo Burini =

Italian footballer and coach (1927–2019)

Personal information
- Date of birth: 10 October 1927
- Place of birth: Palmanova, Italy
- Date of death: 25 October 2019 (aged 92)
- Place of death: Milan, Italy
- Height: 1.75 m (5 ft 9 in)
- Position: Forward

Senior career*
Years	Team	Apps	(Gls)
1947–1953	Milan	190	(88)
1953–1959	Lazio	140	(35)
1959–1962	Cesena	66	(14)

International career
1951–1955	Italy	4	(1)

Managerial career
- 1959–1961: Cesena
- 1962–1963: Forlì
- 1968–1970: Pro Patria (assistant)
- 1970–1972: Pro Patria
- 1974–1979: Monza (assistant)
- 1981–1983: Pro Patria (assistant)
- 1984–1985: Omegna
- * Club domestic league appearances and goals

Renzo Burini (Italian pronunciation: [ˈrɛntso buˈriːni]; 10 October 1927 – 25 October 2019) was an Italian professional football player and coach, who played as a striker or as a winger. He was born in Palmanova.

== Club career ==
Burini played for 12 seasons (330 games, 123 goals) in the Italian Serie A for A.C. Milan and S.S. Lazio. He made his debut with Milan at the age of 20, in an 8–1 win over Bari, marking the occasion with a brace. He scored 12 goals during the 1950–51 Serie A season, helping Milan capture the league title after a 44-year wait, and also won the Latin Cup later that season.

He is remembered by Lazio fans for his contribution to winning the first major trophy for the club, the Coppa Italia in 1958, and for his performance in two Derby della Capitale games against cross-city rivals Roma: in Lazio's 1955 3–1 Rome Derby victory, he scored two goals, and in the 1958 edition of the Rome Derby, he scored one and set up Arne Selmosson for another in a 2–1 victory.

== International career ==
Burini made his debut for the Italy national football team on 8 April 1951 in a game against Portugal and scored on his debut. He was a member of the team which took part at the 1948 Summer Olympics.

== Style of play ==
A versatile forward, Burini could play both as a striker and as a winger, and was known for his pace and eye for goal.

== Honours ==
=== Club ===
Milan

- Serie A: 1950–51
- Latin Cup: 1951

Lazio

- Coppa Italia winner: 1957–58.

=== International ===
- Represented Italy at the 1948 Summer Olympics.

=== Individual ===
- Among the top 10 goalscorers of the Serie A for 3 seasons: 1949–50, 1951–52, 1952–53.
- A.C. Milan Hall of Fame
