= Gunnar Nordahl =

Swedish footballer (1925–1995)

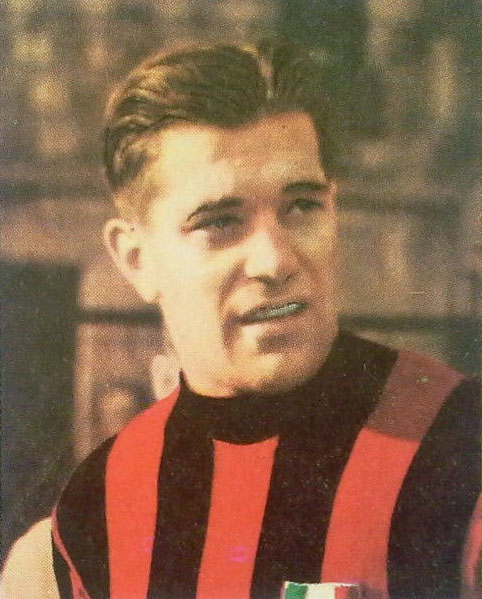
- Nordahl with AC Milan in the 1950s

Personal information
- Full name: Nils Gunnar Nordahl
- Date of birth: 19 October 1921
- Place of birth: Hörnefors, Sweden
- Date of death: 15 September 1995 (aged 73)
- Place of death: Alghero, Italy
- Height: 1.80 m (5 ft 11 in)
- Position: Striker

Senior career*
Years	Team	Apps	(Gls)
1937–1940	Hörnefors IF	41	(68)
1940–1944	Degerfors IF	77	(56)
1944–1949	IFK Norrköping	92	(93)
1949–1956	AC Milan	257	(210)
1956–1958	Roma	34	(15)
1959–1960	Karlstad BIK	24	(11)
Total		525	(453)

International career
1942–1948	Sweden	33	(43)

Managerial career
- 1958–1959: AS Roma (player-manager)
- 1959–1961: Karlstad BIK
- 1961–1964: Degerfors IF
- 1967–1970: IFK Norrköping
- 1971–1973: IF Saab
- 1974: IK Sleipner
- 1975–1976: Östers IF
- 1977–1978: AIK
- 1979–1980: IFK Norrköping
Medal record
Men's Football
Representing Sweden
Olympic Games
Gold medal – first place	1948 London	Team competition
- * Club domestic league appearances and goals

Nils Gunnar Nordahl (Swedish pronunciation: [ˈɡɵ̌nːar ˈnûːɖɑːl]; 19 October 1921 – 15 September 1995) was a Swedish professional footballer. A highly prolific, powerful, and physically strong striker, he is best known for his spell at AC Milan from 1949 to 1956, in which he won the scudetto twice, and also the title of pluricapocannoniere, with an unprecedented five top scorer (capocannonieri) awards, more than any other player in the history of the Italian championship.

Nordahl is Milan's all-time record goalscorer, and he long held the record for most goals for a single club in the history of Italian league, before being surpassed by Francesco Totti in January 2012. He still holds the record for goals per appearance in Italy. He had several nicknames in Italy, whereof the most famous was Il Cannoniere ("The Prime Gunner"). He was also known as Il Pompiere ("The Fireman") and Il Bisonte ("The Bison'").

A full international between 1942 and 1948, he won 33 caps and scored 43 goals for the Sweden national team. He represented his country at the 1948 Summer Olympics, where he was the joint top scorer alongside Denmark's John Hansen as Sweden won gold.

Nordahl is considered to be one of the greatest Swedish players and one of the best strikers of all-time. In 2017, he was included in FourFourTwo magazine's list of the 100 greatest players of all time, at the 54th position.

He is the father of former footballer Thomas Nordahl.

== Club career ==
=== Sweden ===
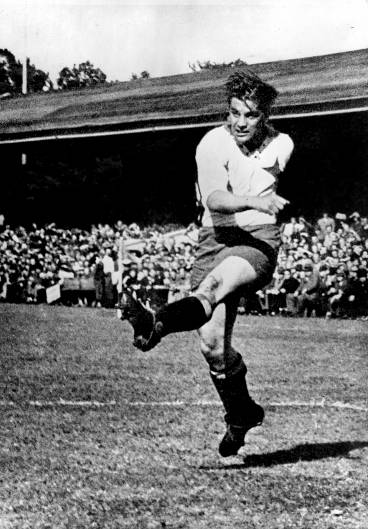
Nordahl playing for IFK Norrköping in 1948

Nordahl started out at Hörnefors IF in Sweden before moving to first Degerfors IF and then IFK Norrköping. He won four Swedish championships with IFK Norrköping and once scored seven goals in one game. During his time in Swedish clubs, Nordahl scored 149 goals in 172 matches.

=== Italy ===
Nordahl transferred to AC Milan on 22 January 1949. This made him the first Swedish player to play in a foreign league. Later, he would team up with his national team strike partners, Gunnar Gren and Nils Liedholm to form the renowned Gre-No-Li trio. Playing eight seasons with Milan, he was Serie A's top scorer a record five times (1949–50, 1950–51, 1952–53, 1953–54 and 1954–55). Nordahl is also Milan's all-time top-scorer, with 210 league goals.

Nordahl is the third-highest Serie A goalscorer of all time, with 225 goals in 291 matches, only behind Silvio Piola and Francesco Totti. That makes Nordahl the top goalscorer among non-Italian players, and he is also the most efficient goalscorer goals in Serie A ever with 0.77 goals/match. He was nicknamed Il Pompiere ("The Fireman"), because of his former job while he played in Sweden.

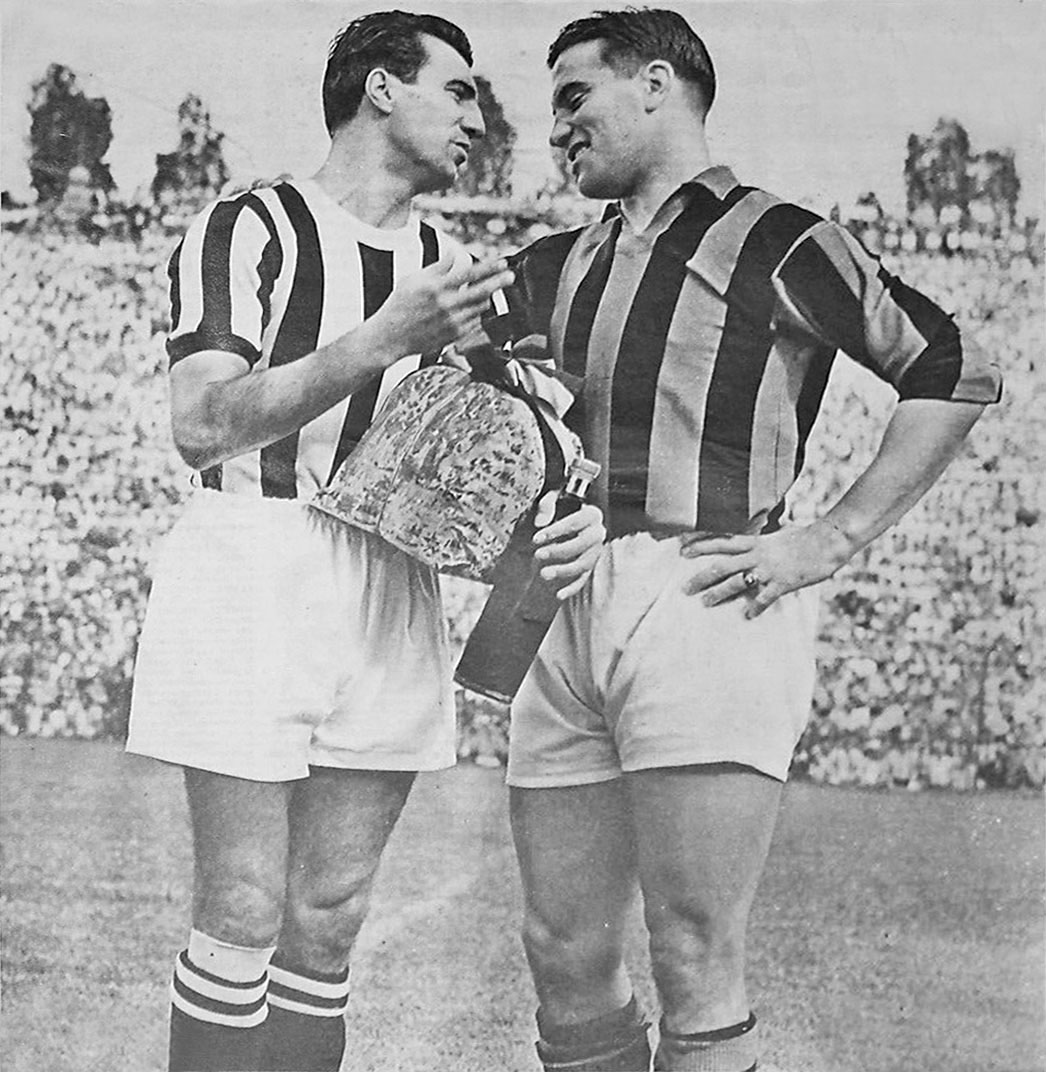
From left to right: Juventus' Parola and AC Milan's Nordahl prior to a friendly match at San Siro in 1950

After leaving Milan, Nordahl played for Roma for two seasons. Nordahl's record for most goals scored in Serie A (not including Divisione Nazionale, before Serie A was installed) of 35 in 1949–50 in a season was broken by Gonzalo Higuaín in the 2015–16 season who scored 36. Nordahl, together with the mentioned Gre-No-Li is today legendary in Milan. When Milan striker Andriy Shevchenko scored his 100th goal in Serie A for Milan, it is said that some old Milanese supporters commented: "Well he can double that number, and then add another 26, then, and just then, he has passed Il Cannoniere."

== International career ==
Nordahl was first called up to the Sweden national team in 1942. In 1948, he helped Sweden to win the Olympic football tournament, achieving top tournament scoring status. The Swedish team also included his brothers Bertil and Knut Nordahl. Nordahl's transfer to Milan forced him to retire from the national team, as the rules at the time prevented professionals from serving on the Sweden national team and unavailable to the 1950 FIFA World Cup as were Gren and Liedholm. His 33 matches in the national team resulted in scoring 43 goals. However, both Nordahl and other Swedish professionals appeared in the euphemistic Sveriges proffslandslag ("Swedish professional national team") during the 1950s. The latter was discontinued in 1958, when Sweden, like many other nations, lifted the professional ban for respective national team consideration.

== Career statistics ==
=== Club ===
Appearances and goals by club, season and competition
Club	Season	League			Cup		Europe		Total	
Club	Season	Division	Apps	Goals	Apps	Goals	Apps	Goals	Apps	Goals
Hörnefors IF	1937–38	Division 3 Nedre Norrländskan	14	20	—		—		14	20
Hörnefors IF	1938–39	Division 3 Nedre Norrländskan	14	25	—		—		14	25
Hörnefors IF	1939–40	Division 3 Nedre Norrländskan	13	23	—		—		13	23
Hörnefors IF	Total		41	68	—		—		41	68
Degerfors	1940–41	Allsvenskan	17	15	—		—		17	15
Degerfors	1941–42	Allsvenskan	21	13	—		—		21	13
Degerfors	1942–43	Allsvenskan	20	14	—		—		20	14
Degerfors	1943–44	Allsvenskan	19	14	—		—		19	14
Degerfors	Total		77	56	—		—		77	56
Norrköping	1944–45	Allsvenskan	19	27	—		—		19	27
Norrköping	1945–46	Allsvenskan	21	25	—		—		21	25
Norrköping	1946–47	Allsvenskan	20	17	—		—		20	17
Norrköping	1947–48	Allsvenskan	22	18	—		—		22	18
Norrköping	1948–49	Allsvenskan	10	6	—		—		10	6
Norrköping	Total		92	93	—		—		92	93
AC Milan	1948–49	Serie A	15	16	—		—		15	16
AC Milan	1949–50	Serie A	37	35	—		—		37	35
AC Milan	1950–51	Serie A	37	34	—		2 (Note: Appearance(s) in Latin Cup)	4	39	38
AC Milan	1951–52	Serie A	38	26	—		—		38	26
AC Milan	1952–53	Serie A	32	26	—		2 (Note: Appearance(s) in Latin Cup)	2	34	28
AC Milan	1953–54	Serie A	33	23	—		—		33	23
AC Milan	1954–55	Serie A	33	27	—		2 (Note: Appearance(s) in Latin Cup)	1	35	28
AC Milan	1955–56	Serie A	32	23	—		5 (Note: Appearance(s) in European Cup)	4	37	27
AC Milan	Total		257	210	—		11	11	268	221
Roma	1956–57	Serie A	30	13	—		—		30	13
Roma	1957–58	Serie A	4	2	—		—		4	2
Roma	Total		34	15	—		—		34	15
Karlstad BIK	1959	Division 2 Svealand			—		—			
Karlstad BIK	1960	Division 2 Svealand			—		—			
Karlstad BIK	Total		24	11	—		—		24	11
Career total			525	453	—		11	11	536	464

=== International ===
Appearances and goals by national team and year
National team	Year	Apps	Goals
Sweden	1942	4	2
Sweden	1943	5	5
Sweden	1944	0	0
Sweden	1945	5	7
Sweden	1946	3	2
Sweden	1947	7	15
Sweden	1948	9	12
Total		33	43

Scores and results list Sweden's goal tally first, score column indicates score after each Nordahl goal.

List of international goals scored by Gunnar Nordahl
No.	Date	Venue	Opponent	Score	Result	Competition	Ref.
1	28 June 1942	Parken, Copenhagen, Denmark	Denmark	2–0	3–0	Friendly	
2	4 October 1942	Råsunda Stadium, Solna, Sweden	Denmark	2–0	2–1	Friendly	
3	20 June 1943	Parken, Copenhagen, Denmark	Denmark	2–2	2–3	Friendly	
4	12 September 1943	Råsunda Stadium, Solna, Sweden	Hungary	1–0	2–3	Friendly	
5	12 September 1943	Råsunda Stadium, Solna, Sweden	Hungary	2–1	2–3	Friendly	
6	7 November 1943	Üllői úti stadion, Budapest, Hungary	Hungary	4–2	7–2	Friendly	
7	7 November 1943	Üllői úti stadion, Budapest, Hungary	Hungary	5–2	7–2	Friendly	
8	24 June 1945	Råsunda Stadium, Solna, Sweden	Denmark	1–1	2–1	Friendly	
9	1 July 1945	Parken, Copenhagen, Denmark	Denmark	2–1	4–3	Friendly	
10	30 September 1945	Råsunda Stadium, Solna, Sweden	Denmark	1–1	4–1	Friendly	
11	21 October 1945	Råsunda Stadium, Solna, Sweden	Norway	2–0	10–0	Friendly	
12	21 October 1945	Råsunda Stadium, Solna, Sweden	Norway	3–0	10–0	Friendly	
13	21 October 1945	Råsunda Stadium, Solna, Sweden	Norway	8–0	10–0	Friendly	
14	21 October 1945	Råsunda Stadium, Solna, Sweden	Norway	10–0	10–0	Friendly	
15	7 July 1946	Råsunda Stadium, Solna, Sweden	Switzerland	7–2	7–2	Friendly	
16	6 October 1946	Gamla Ullevi, Gothenburg, Sweden	Denmark	3–2	3–3	Friendly	
17	15 June 1947	Parken, Copenhagen, Denmark	Denmark	1–0	4–1	1937–47 Nordic Football Championship	
18	15 June 1947	Parken, Copenhagen, Denmark	Denmark	2–0	4–1	1937–47 Nordic Football Championship	
19	26 June 1947	Råsunda Stadium, Solna, Sweden	Denmark	4–0	6–1	Friendly	
20	28 June 1947	Helsinki Olympic Stadium, Helsinki, Finland	Norway	1–1	5–1	Friendly	
21	28 June 1947	Helsinki Olympic Stadium, Helsinki, Finland	Norway	2–1	5–1	Friendly	
22	28 June 1947	Helsinki Olympic Stadium, Helsinki, Finland	Norway	3–1	5–1	Friendly	
23	28 June 1947	Helsinki Olympic Stadium, Helsinki, Finland	Norway	4–1	5–1	Friendly	
24	24 August 1947	Ryavallen, Örebro, Sweden	Finland	2–0	7–0	1937–47 Nordic Football Championship	
25	24 August 1947	Ryavallen, Örebro, Sweden	Finland	4–0	7–0	1937–47 Nordic Football Championship	
26	24 August 1947	Ryavallen, Örebro, Sweden	Finland	5–0	7–0	1937–47 Nordic Football Championship	
27	14 September 1947	Råsunda Stadium, Solna, Sweden	Poland	1–1	5–4	Friendly	
28	14 September 1947	Råsunda Stadium, Solna, Sweden	Poland	4–2	5–4	Friendly	
29	5 October 1947	Råsunda Stadium, Solna, Sweden	Norway	2–0	4–1	1937–47 Nordic Football Championship	
30	5 October 1947	Råsunda Stadium, Solna, Sweden	Norway	3–1	4–1	1937–47 Nordic Football Championship	
31	19 November 1947	Highbury, London, England	England	1–2	2–4	Friendly	
32	2 August 1948	White Hart Lane, London, England	Austria	1–0	3–0	1948 Summer Olympics	
33	2 August 1948	White Hart Lane, London, England	Austria	2–0	3–0	1948 Summer Olympics	
34	5 August 1948	Selhurst Park, London, England	South Korea	2–0	12–0	1948 Summer Olympics	
35	5 August 1948	Selhurst Park, London, England	South Korea	4–0	12–0	1948 Summer Olympics	
36	5 August 1948	Selhurst Park, London, England	South Korea	9–0	12–0	1948 Summer Olympics	
37	5 August 1948	Selhurst Park, London, England	South Korea	10–0	12–0	1948 Summer Olympics	
38	13 August 1948	Wembley Stadium, London, England	Yugoslavia	2–1	3–1	1948 Summer Olympics	
39	19 September 1948	Ullevaal Stadium, Oslo, Norway	Norway	1–1	5–3	1948–51 Nordic Football Championship	
40	19 September 1948	Ullevaal Stadium, Oslo, Norway	Norway	2–2	5–3	1948–51 Nordic Football Championship	
41	19 September 1948	Ullevaal Stadium, Oslo, Norway	Norway	3–2	5–3	1948–51 Nordic Football Championship	
42	19 September 1948	Ullevaal Stadium, Oslo, Norway	Norway	4–2	5–3	1948–51 Nordic Football Championship	
43	19 September 1948	Ullevaal Stadium, Oslo, Norway	Norway	5–2	5–3	1948–51 Nordic Football Championship	

== Honours ==
IFK Norrköping

- Allsvenskan: 1944–45, 1945–46, 1946–47, 1947–48
- Svenska Cupen: 1945

AC Milan

- Serie A: 1950–51, 1954–55
- Latin Cup: 1951, 1956

Sweden

- Olympic Gold Medal: 1948
- Nordic Football Championship: 1937–1947

Individual

- Allsvenskan top scorer: 1942–43, 1944–45, 1945–46, 1947–48
- Swedish Footballer of the Year: 1947
- Olympic Games top scorer: 1948
- Capocannoniere: 1949–50, 1950–51, 1952–53, 1953–54, 1954–55
- Serie A Team of The Year: 1951, 1955
- AC Milan Hall of Fame
- Venerdì's 100 Magnifici
- Nordic Football Championship top scorer: 1937–1947
- Allsvenskan Player of the Century: 1924–2024

Records

- Most goals scored for AC Milan: 221
- Most Serie A Top Scorer titles: 5
- Most consecutive Serie A Top Scorer titles: 3 (record shared with Michel Platini)
- Most braces scored in Serie A: 49 (record shared with Silvio Piola)
- Most hat-tricks scored in Serie A: 17 (all with AC Milan)

== See also ==
- List of men's footballers with 500 or more goals
- List of footballers who achieved hat-trick records
- List of AC Milan players
- List of foreign Serie A players
