= Mario Foglia =

Italian footballer and manager

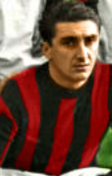

Personal information
- Full name: Mario Adriano Edoardo Foglia
- Date of birth: 13 January 1921
- Place of birth: Stroppiana, Italy
- Date of death: 28 May 1999 (aged 78)
- Place of death: Valenza Po, Italy
- Position: Defender

Youth career
- Alessandria

Senior career*
Years	Team	Apps	(Gls)
1939–1944	Alessandria	94	(38)
1944–1945	Pavia	0	(0)
1945–1946	Biellese	19	(0)
1946	Brescia	0	(0)
1946–1951	Milan	127	(0)
1951–1953	Palermo	48	(0)
Total		288	(38)

Managerial career
- 1971–1973: Valenzana
- 1974–1977: Monferrato
- * Club domestic league appearances and goals

Mario Foglia (13 January 1921 – 28 May 1999) was an Italian professional footballer who played as a defender and football manager.

== Honours ==
=== Club ===
- A.C. Milan
  - Serie A: 1950–51
