= 1950–51 Serie A =

48th season of top-tier Italian football

Serie A
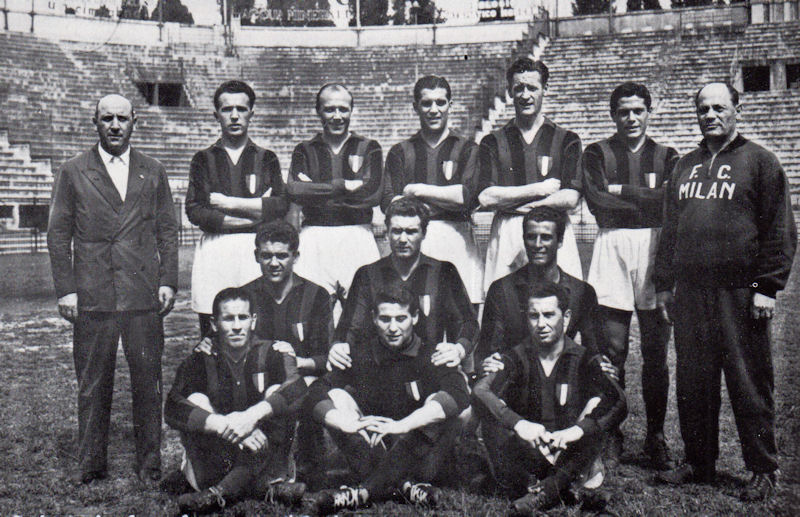
- 1950–51 Serie A winning Milan squad
- Season: 1950–51
- Champions: AC Milan; 4th title
- Relegated: Roma; Genoa
- Matches: 380
- Goals: 1,192 (3.14 per match)
- Top goalscorer: Gunnar Nordahl (34 goals)

The 1950–51 Serie A was the forty-ninth edition of the Italian Football Championship. It was the eighteenth Italian Football Championship branded as Serie A, since Serie A was launched in 1929. This was the twenty-fifth season from which the Italian Football Champions adorned their team jerseys in the subsequent season with a Scudetto. AC Milan were champions for the fourth time in their history. This was their first scudetto since the scudetto started being awarded in 1924 and their first win contested as Serie A.

== Teams ==
Napoli and Udinese had been promoted from Serie B.

Serie A 1950-51 team distribution

== Final classification ==
| Pos | Team | Pld | W | D | L | GF | GA | GD | Pts | Qualification or relegation |
|---|---|---|---|---|---|---|---|---|---|---|
| 1 | Milan (C) | 38 | 26 | 8 | 4 | 107 | 39 | +68 | 60 | 1951 Latin Cup |
| 2 | Internazionale | 38 | 27 | 5 | 6 | 107 | 43 | +64 | 59 | |
| 3 | Juventus | 38 | 23 | 8 | 7 | 103 | 44 | +59 | 54 | |
| 4 | Lazio | 38 | 18 | 10 | 10 | 64 | 50 | +14 | 46 | |
| 5 | Fiorentina | 38 | 18 | 8 | 12 | 52 | 42 | +10 | 44 | |
| 6 | Napoli | 38 | 15 | 11 | 12 | 57 | 52 | +5 | 41 | |
| 6 | Bologna | 38 | 16 | 9 | 13 | 61 | 59 | +2 | 41 | |
| 8 | Como | 38 | 18 | 4 | 16 | 56 | 66 | −10 | 40 | |
| 9 | Udinese | 38 | 11 | 13 | 14 | 46 | 61 | −15 | 35 | |
| 10 | Palermo | 38 | 14 | 6 | 18 | 59 | 67 | −8 | 34 | |
| 10 | Pro Patria | 38 | 14 | 6 | 18 | 47 | 74 | −27 | 34 | |
| 12 | Novara | 38 | 13 | 7 | 18 | 56 | 67 | −11 | 33 | |
| 12 | Sampdoria | 38 | 12 | 9 | 17 | 51 | 76 | −25 | 33 | |
| 14 | Atalanta | 38 | 10 | 12 | 16 | 48 | 69 | −21 | 32 | |
| 15 | Lucchese | 38 | 11 | 8 | 19 | 44 | 53 | −9 | 30 | |
| 15 | Triestina | 38 | 10 | 10 | 18 | 45 | 67 | −22 | 30 | |
| 15 | Torino | 38 | 9 | 12 | 17 | 46 | 69 | −23 | 30 | |
| 18 | Padova | 38 | 12 | 5 | 21 | 49 | 68 | −19 | 29 | |
| 19 | Roma (R) | 38 | 10 | 8 | 20 | 48 | 54 | −6 | 28 | Relegation to Serie B |
| 20 | Genoa (R) | 38 | 9 | 9 | 20 | 46 | 72 | −26 | 27 | Relegation to Serie B |

Source: Panini
(C) Champions; (R) Relegated

== Results ==
| Home \ Away | ATA | BOL | COM | FIO | GEN | INT | JUV | LAZ | LUC | MIL | NAP | NOV | PAD | PAL | PPA | ROM | SAM | TOR | TRI | UDI |
|---|---|---|---|---|---|---|---|---|---|---|---|---|---|---|---|---|---|---|---|---|
| Atalanta | | 2–0 | 2–1 | 0–2 | 2–1 | 3–3 | 1–5 | 1–0 | 0–5 | 4–7 | 2–2 | 3–0 | 3–1 | 3–2 | 1–0 | 0–0 | 0–0 | 1–1 | 1–0 | 0–0 |
| Bologna | 3–2 | | 0–2 | 0–1 | 3–3 | 1–1 | 0–5 | 7–2 | 2–0 | 0–0 | 2–0 | 1–0 | 2–2 | 2–0 | 5–2 | 3–1 | 0–0 | 2–1 | 1–0 | 5–2 |
| Como | 1–0 | 2–1 | | 1–0 | 3–2 | 3–1 | 1–0 | 2–1 | 5–0 | 2–2 | 1–2 | 2–1 | 1–0 | 2–1 | 2–1 | 1–0 | 2–0 | 4–2 | 3–1 | 0–2 |
| Fiorentina | 1–0 | 2–1 | 3–0 | | 1–0 | 1–2 | 1–2 | 1–0 | 3–1 | 1–1 | 2–0 | 2–1 | 4–1 | 1–0 | 3–0 | 1–0 | 3–0 | 3–3 | 3–1 | 1–1 |
| Genoa | 0–2 | 1–2 | 3–2 | 1–1 | | 2–2 | 0–3 | 3–0 | 2–1 | 0–3 | 1–2 | 3–0 | 3–1 | 0–0 | 1–0 | 2–2 | 2–3 | 1–0 | 3–2 | 1–1 |
| Internazionale | 3–1 | 3–1 | 4–2 | 2–0 | 5–2 | | 3–0 | 0–0 | 2–1 | 0–1 | 4–3 | 5–0 | 5–1 | 3–1 | 6–0 | 6–0 | 5–1 | 3–1 | 2–0 | 6–1 |
| Juventus | 6–2 | 1–1 | 0–3 | 5–0 | 4–1 | 0–2 | | 1–1 | 1–0 | 1–1 | 3–2 | 4–0 | 5–1 | 4–1 | 2–1 | 7–2 | 7–2 | 5–1 | 2–2 | 1–1 |
| Lazio | 5–0 | 1–0 | 2–0 | 2–1 | 3–1 | 3–3 | 0–3 | | 2–0 | 1–1 | 3–1 | 0–0 | 4–0 | 3–3 | 4–2 | 2–1 | 2–2 | 3–0 | 2–0 | 3–2 |
| Lucchese | 2–1 | 0–1 | 5–0 | 0–2 | 0–0 | 3–2 | 0–1 | 1–1 | | 1–5 | 1–0 | 2–2 | 3–2 | 0–0 | 0–0 | 1–0 | 4–0 | 2–0 | 2–0 | 0–1 |
| Milan | 3–3 | 1–2 | 7–2 | 1–0 | 4–0 | 2–3 | 2–0 | 1–2 | 2–0 | | 2–1 | 9–2 | 3–1 | 9–0 | 2–0 | 2–0 | 2–0 | 3–0 | 2–0 | 6–2 |
| Napoli | 0–0 | 4–1 | 7–0 | 3–2 | 1–1 | 0–4 | 1–1 | 0–0 | 1–0 | 3–5 | | 3–0 | 1–0 | 3–0 | 1–1 | 0–0 | 4–0 | 1–1 | 2–1 | 2–1 |
| Novara | 1–1 | 1–2 | 1–1 | 0–1 | 1–0 | 0–1 | 3–1 | 4–2 | 3–3 | 1–3 | 6–0 | | 2–1 | 3–0 | 3–0 | 1–0 | 3–0 | 3–2 | 4–1 | 2–0 |
| Padova | 0–0 | 0–2 | 3–1 | 3–0 | 4–0 | 2–3 | 0–1 | 2–0 | 2–1 | 1–2 | 2–0 | 1–2 | | 1–0 | 3–1 | 3–1 | 2–1 | 2–2 | 2–0 | 1–1 |
| Palermo | 2–0 | 1–1 | 3–0 | 1–0 | 4–1 | 0–3 | 1–5 | 2–1 | 1–0 | 0–2 | 0–1 | 3–2 | 3–1 | | 8–0 | 3–0 | 4–1 | 1–1 | 6–0 | 1–0 |
| Pro Patria | 2–0 | 2–0 | 1–0 | 2–1 | 5–2 | 2–0 | 0–7 | 1–0 | 2–2 | 0–0 | 1–3 | 2–1 | 1–0 | 2–1 | | 3–1 | 1–1 | 4–3 | 2–2 | 2–1 |
| Roma | 3–3 | 2–2 | 2–0 | 3–0 | 0–1 | 0–1 | 3–0 | 0–1 | 0–1 | 2–1 | 0–0 | 0–0 | 5–0 | 1–2 | 2–0 | | 5–0 | 1–0 | 5–0 | 4–1 |
| Sampdoria | 2–1 | 7–2 | 2–1 | 0–0 | 2–1 | 0–4 | 1–1 | 1–1 | 3–1 | 1–2 | 3–1 | 1–1 | 1–2 | 5–1 | 2–0 | 1–0 | | 2–1 | 3–1 | 1–1 |
| Torino | 1–1 | 1–1 | 2–2 | 1–1 | 2–1 | 2–1 | 1–4 | 0–1 | 2–0 | 0–4 | 0–0 | 2–1 | 2–1 | 2–1 | 1–0 | 0–0 | 3–1 | | 1–0 | 3–3 |
| Triestina | 2–1 | 2–1 | 1–0 | 1–1 | 0–0 | 2–1 | 2–2 | 1–3 | 0–0 | 3–4 | 1–1 | 3–0 | 0–0 | 4–2 | 3–1 | 4–2 | 2–1 | 2–0 | | 0–0 |
| Udinese | 2–1 | 2–1 | 1–1 | 2–2 | 1–0 | 1–3 | 0–3 | 2–3 | 2–1 | 0–0 | 0–1 | 2–1 | 2–0 | 0–0 | 0–3 | 1–0 | 3–0 | 3–1 | 1–1 | |

Source: Almanacco Illustrato del Calcio - La Storia 1898-2004, Panini Edizioni, Modena, September 2005 (in Italian)
Legend: Blue = home team win; Yellow = draw; Red = away team win.

== Top goalscorers ==
| Rank | Player | Club | Goals |
|---|---|---|---|
| 1 | (Sweden) Gunnar Nordahl | Milan | 34 |
| 2 | (Hungarian People's Republic) István Nyers | Internazionale | 31 |
| 3 | (Denmark) Karl Aage Hansen | Juventus | 24 |
| 4 | (Netherlands) Faas Wilkes | Internazionale | 23 |
| 5 | (Italy) Giampiero Boniperti | Juventus | 22 |
| 6 | (Italy) Benito Lorenzi | Internazionale | 21 |
| 7 | (Denmark) John Hansen | Juventus | 20 |
| 8 | (Italy) Silvio Piola | Novara | 19 |
| 8 | (Denmark) Jørgen Leschly Sørensen | Atalanta | 19 |
| 10 | (Italy) Gino Cappello | Bologna | 16 |
| 11 | (Italy) Dante Di Maso | Palermo | 15 |
| 11 | (Denmark) Karl Aage Præst | Juventus | 15 |
| 11 | (Italy) Carlo Annovazzi | Milan | 15 |
| 14 | (Italy) Cesarino Cervellati | Bologna | 14 |
| 14 | (Argentina) Benjamin Santos | Torino | 14 |
| 16 | (Sweden) Bror Mellberg | Genoa | 13 |
| 16 | (Argentina) Josè Osvaldo Curti | Padova | 13 |
| 16 | (Turkey) Şükrü Gülesin | Palermo | 13 |

== References and sources ==
- Almanacco Illustrato del Calcio - La Storia 1898-2004, Panini Edizioni, Modena, September 2005
