= Carlo Annovazzi =

Italian footballer (1925-1980)

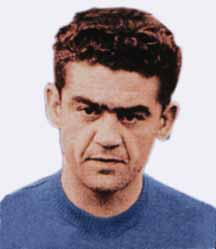

Personal information
- Date of birth: 24 May 1925
- Place of birth: Milan, Italy
- Date of death: 10 October 1980 (aged 55)
- Place of death: Milan, Italy
- Position: Midfielder

Senior career*
Years	Team	Apps	(Gls)
1945–1953	A.C. Milan	281	(53)
1953–1958	Atalanta	129	(18)
1958–1959	Anconitana	21	(3)
1959–1960	Pro Patria	2	(0)
1960–1961	Città di Castello	1	(0)

International career
1947–1952	Italy	17	(0)
- * Club domestic league appearances and goals

Carlo Annovazzi (Italian pronunciation: [ˈkarlo annoˈvattsi]; 24 May 1925 – 10 October 1980) was an Italian footballer who played as a midfielder. He was usually deployed as a right-sided, central, or defensive midfielder, although he was also capable of playing in defence. A large and physically imposing player, despite his deeper playing role, he was known for his eye for goal as a footballer, and was also an accurate penalty kick taker; during his time with A.C. Milan, he successfully converted all eight of the spot kicks he took.

== Club career ==
Throughout his club career, Annovazzi played for A.C. Milan, Atalanta, Anconitana, Pro Patria and Città di Castello. He made his Serie A debut with Milan in a 1–1 away draw against Modena on 16 December 1945. He was a member of the Milan side that won the 1950–51 Serie A title, after a 44-year title drought, as well as the Coppa Latina; he contributed to the team's title success by scoring 17 goals throughout the season, 16 of which came in Serie A, and one in the Coppa Latina.

== International career ==
At international level, Annovazzi also represented the Italy national team at the 1950 FIFA World Cup. He made his international debut in a 3–1 home win over Czechoslovakia on 14 December 1947. In total, he made 17 appearances for Italy between 1947 and 1952, during a time in which most of the team was composed of players from the legendary Grande Torino side of the 40s, and was Italy's captain between 1951 and 1952.

== Honours ==
Milan

- Serie A: 1950–51
- Coppa Latina: 1951

Individual

- A.C. Milan Hall of Fame
