= 1954–55 AC Milan season =

Associazione Calcio Milan
1954–55 season
- Chairman: Andrea Rizzoli
- Manager: Béla Guttmann (until February); Héctor Puricelli
- Stadium: San Siro
- Serie A: 1st (in European Cup)
- Latin Cup: 3º
- Top goalscorer: League: Gunnar Nordahl (27); All: Nordahl (28)
- Average home league attendance: 26,745
Home colours	Away colours

During 1954–55 season Associazione Calcio Milan competed in Serie A and Latin Cup.

== Summary ==
Aimed with the goals of Gunnar Nordahl and the arrival of Uruguayan Juan Alberto Schiaffino from Peñarol, the team clinched its fifth domestic title ever. Manager Béla Guttman was fired in February replaced by Uruguayan Ettore Puricelli in a move to boost the players moral being crucial to win the championship.

== Squad ==
Note: Flags indicate national team as defined under FIFA eligibility rules; some limited exceptions apply. Players may hold more than one non-FIFA nationality.

Pos.	Nation	Player
GK	ITA	Lorenzo Buffon
GK	ITA	Riccardo Toros
DF	ITA	Cesare Maldini
DF	ITA	Franco Pedroni
DF	ITA	Arturo Silvestri
DF	ITA	Francesco Zagatti
MF	ITA	Eros Beraldo
MF	ITA	Mario Bergamaschi
MF	ITA	Alfio Fontana
MF	SWE	Nils Liedholm

Pos.	Nation	Player
MF	ARG	Eduardo Ricagni
MF	URU	Juan Alberto Schiaffino
MF	ITA	Omero Tognon (Captain)
MF	ITA	Alessandro Vitali
FW	ITA	Amleto Frignani
FW	ITA	Giancarlo Magnavacca
FW	SWE	Gunnar Nordahl (vice-Captain)
FW	DEN	Jørgen Leschly Sørensen
FW	ITA	Valentino Valli
FW	ITA	Albano Vicariotto

=== Transfers ===
In
Pos.	Name	from	Type
GK	Renzo Biondani	Mantova	–
FW	Giancarlo Magnavacca	Pro Sesto	–
DF	Cesare Maldini	Triestina	–
MF	Eduardo Ricagni	Juventus	–
MF	Juan Alberto Schiaffino	Peñarol	–
GK	Riccardo Toros	Fanfulla	–
FW	Valentino Valli	Piombino	–

Out
Pos.	Name	To	Type
MF	Stelio Darin	Parma	–
FW	Giuseppe Galluzzo	Monza	–
MF	Enrico Larini	Siracusa	–
FW	Angelo Longoni	Lecce	–
DF	Alvaro Moreno	Monza	–
DF	Silvano Moro	Vicenza	–
MF	Alberto Piccinini	Palermo	–
DF	Giancarlo Pistorello	Monza	–
FW	Ugo Trabattoni	Palermo	–

== Competitions ==
=== Serie A ===
==== League table ====
Pos	Team	Pld	W	D	L	GF	GA	GD	Pts	Qualification or relegation
1	Milan (C)	34	19	10	5	81	35	+46	48	Qualification for the European Cup and for the Latin Cup
2	Udinese (D, R)	34	16	12	6	58	42	+16	44	Relegation to Serie B (Note: Catania and Udinese were relegated to Serie B by the FIGC for a corruption case. Pro Patria and SPAL maintained their places in Serie A.)
3	Roma	34	13	15	6	53	39	+14	41	
4	Bologna	34	15	10	9	56	47	+9	40	
5	Fiorentina	34	14	11	9	49	48	+1	39	

Source: Panini
(C) Champions; (D) Disqualified; (R) Relegated

==== Matches ====
19 September 1954 1	Milan	4–0	Triestina	Milan
	Schiaffino 16', 18'; Ricagni 68'; Liedholm 82' (pen.)	Report		Stadium: San Siro; Attendance: 38 000; Referee: Tommaso Corallo

26 September 1954 2	Sampdoria	0–3	Milan	Genoa
		Report	38', 60', 80' Nordahl	Stadium: Stadio Luigi Ferraris; Attendance: 40,000; Referee: Cesare Jonni

3 October 1954 3	Milan	3–1	Atalanta	Milan
	Nordahl 47'; Zannier 65' (o.g.); Schiaffino 75'	Report	82' Bassetto	Stadium: San Siro; Attendance: 50,000; Referee: Gilberto Arpaia

10 October 1954 4	Catania	1–3	Milan	Catania
	Spikofski 52'	Report	31' (pen.) Liedholm; 66' Schiaffino; 69' Ricagni	Stadium: Cibali; Attendance: 35,000; Referee: Ferruccio Bellè

17 October 1954 5	Napoli	0–2	Milan	Naples
		Report	27' Valli; 86' Ricagni	Stadium: Stadio della Liberazione; Attendance: 40,000; Referee: Cesare Jonni

24 October 1954 6	Milan	4–1	Torino	Milan
	Nordahl 23'; Sørensen 81', 87'; Liedholm 88' (pen.)	Report	56' Buhtz	Stadium: San Siro; Attendance: 45,000; Referee: Iginio Rigato

31 October 1954 7	Bologna	1–2	Milan	Bologna
	Cervellati 13'	Report	20' Schiaffino; 67' Nordahl	Stadium: Comunale; Attendance: 60,000; Referee: Vincenzo Orlandini

7 November 1954 8	Milan	1–1	Inter	Milan
	Schiaffino 84'	Report	46' Brighenti	Stadium: San Siro; Attendance: 52,000; Referee: Cesare Jonni

14 November 1954 9	Fiorentina	0–2	Milan	Florence
		Report	25' Schiaffino; 45' Nordahl	Stadium: Comunale; Attendance: 70,000; Referee: Erminio Piemonte

21 November 1954 10	Milan	3–0	Novara	Milan
	Schiaffino 15'; Ricagni 39'; Sørensen 46'	Report		Stadium: San Siro; Attendance: 35 000; Referee: Giorgio Bernardi

12 December 1954 11	Roma	2–1	Milan	Rome
	Bortoletto 61'; Giuliano 80'	Report	26' Sørensen	Stadium: Stadio Olimpico; Attendance: 55,000; Referee: Erminio Piemonte

26 January 1955 12	Milan	2–2	Udinese	Milan
	Sørensen 21'; Nordahl 83'	Report	86', 90' Bettini	Stadium: San Siro; Attendance: 25,000; Referee: Tommaso Corallo

26 December 1954 13	Milan	3–0	Lazio	Milan
	Bergamaschi 58'; Nordahl 64', 82'	Report		Stadium: San Siro; Attendance: 40,000; Referee: Ferruccio Bellè

2 January 1955 14	Juventus	3–4	Milan	Turin
	Manente 20' (pen.); Gimona 73'; Boniperti 89'	Report	1' Nordahl; 27' Ricagni; 69' Sørensen; 71' Frignani	Stadium: Comunale; Attendance: 45,000; Referee: Vincenzo Orlandini

6 January 1955 15	Milan	2–2	Genoa	Milan
	Schiaffino 31', 89'	Report	8' Carapellese; 73' Dal Monte	Stadium: San Siro; Attendance: 18,000; Referee: Iginio Rigato

23 January 1955 16	SPAL	0–0	Milan	Ferrara
		Report		Stadium: Comunale; Attendance: 20,000; Referee: Erminio Piemonte

30 January 1955 17	Milan	2–0	Pro Patria	Milan
	Nordahl 54'; Frignani 66'	Report		Stadium: San Siro; Attendance: 20,000; Referee: Ferruccio Bellè

6 February 1955 18	Triestina	4–3	Milan	Trieste
	Secchi 13'; Lucentini 43', 60'; Maldini 51' (o.g.)	Report	18' Sørensen; 50' Maldini; 85' Nordahl	Stadium: Comunale; Attendance: 17,000; Referee: Cesare Jonni

13 February 1955 19	Milan	1–3	Sampdoria	Milan
	Vicariotto 21'	Report	9' Ronzon; 40' Conti; 82' Mari	Stadium: San Siro; Attendance: 35,000; Referee: Pietro Bonetto

20 February 1955 20	Atalanta	1–1	Milan	Bergamo
	Rasmussen 78'	Report	83' Nordahl	Stadium: Comunale; Attendance: 22,000; Referee: Vincenzo Orlandini

27 February 1955 21	Milan	2–0	Catania	Milan
	Frignani 78'; Nordahl 81'	Report		Stadium: San Siro; Attendance: 25,000; Referee: Iginio Rigato

6 March 1955 22	Milan	1–1	Napoli	Milan
	Liedholm 15'	Report	2' Golin	Stadium: San Siro; Attendance: 30,000; Referee: Francesco Liverani

13 March 1955 23	Torino	1–2	Milan	Turin
	Antoniotti 67'	Report	11' Frignani; 36' Schiaffino	Stadium: Filadelfia; Attendance: 28,000; Referee: Cesare Jonni

20 March 1955 24	Milan	0–0	Bologna	Milan
		Report		Stadium: San Siro; Attendance: 48,000; Referee: Cesare Jonni

3 April 1955 25	Inter	1–1	Milan	Milan
	Brighenti 49'	Report	84' Nordahl	Stadium: San Siro; Attendance: 40,000; Referee: Francesco Liverani

10 April 1955 26	Milan	4–0	Fiorentina	Milan
	Schiaffino 12'; Nordahl 38'; Sørensen 52', 66'	Report		Stadium: San Siro; Attendance: 50,000; Referee: Cesare Jonni

17 April 1955 27	Novara	1–1	Milan	Novara
	Colombi 61'	Report	57' Sørensen	Stadium: Comunale; Attendance: 15,000; Referee: Erminio Piemonte

24 April 1955 28	Milan	0–2	Roma	Milan
		Report	54' (pen.) Pandolfini; 78' Galli	Stadium: San Siro; Attendance: 45,000; Referee: Francesco Liverani

1 May 1955 29	Udinese	3–2	Milan	Udine
	Menegotti 46'; Bettini 50'; La Forgia 62'	Report	52' Vicariotto; 81' Schiaffino	Stadium: Stadio Moretti; Attendance: 28,000; Referee: Cesare Jonni

8 May 1955 30	Lazio	2–4	Milan	Rome
	Hansen 44'; Bredesen 55'	Report	3' Frignani; 45', 89' Sørensen; 67' Vicariotto	Stadium: Olimpico; Attendance: 55,000; Referee: Cesare Jonni

15 May 1955 31	Milan	3–1	Juventus	Milan
	Nordahl 40', 70'; Liedholm 84'	Report	26' Boniperti	Stadium: San Siro; Attendance: 30,000; Referee: Mario Maurelli

5 June 1955 32	Genoa	0–8	Milan	Genoa
		Report	10', 58', 68' Nordahl; 17', 19' Schiaffino; 47', 64' Frignani; 83' Liedholm	Stadium: Stadio Luigi Ferraris; Attendance: 20,000; Referee: Vincenzo Orlandini

12 June 1955 33	Milan	6–0	SPAL	Milan
	Nordahl 40', 59', 74', 83'; Sørensen 45' (pen.); Ricagni 88'	Report		Stadium: San Siro; Attendance: 30,000; Referee: Pietro Bonetto

19 June 1955 34	Pro Patria	1–1	Milan	Busto Arsizio
	Cavigioli 68'	Report	59' Nordahl	Stadium: Comunale; Attendance: 3,000; Referee: Ugo Scaramella

=== Latin Cup ===
==== Semifinals ====
22 June 1955	(France) Stade Reims	3–2 (a.e.t.)	Milan	Paris
	Glovacki 45', 138'; Templin 100'	Report	26' Sørensen; 115' Liedholm	Stadium: Parc des Princes; Attendance: 36,588; Referee: (Portugal) Da Costa

==== Final 3º/4º place ====
26 June 1955	Milan	3–1	(Portugal) Os Belenenses	Paris
	Ricagni 16', 73'; Nordahl 83'	Report	81' Matateu	Stadium: Parc des Princes; Attendance: 5,000; Referee: (Spain) Gardeazabal

== Statistics ==
=== Player statistics ===
Competition	Points	Home						Away						Total						GD
Competition	Points	G	W	D	L	Gs	Ga	G	W	D	L	Gs	Ga	G	W	D	L	Gs	Ga	GD
Serie A	48	17	10	5	2	41	14	17	9	5	3	40	21	34	19	10	5	81	35	+46
Latin Cup	–	–	–	–	–	–	–	–	–	–	–	–	–	2	1	0	1	5	4	+1
Total	–	17	10	5	2	41	14	17	9	5	3	40	21	36	20	10	6	86	39	+47

=== Appearances ===
- 20. (Italy) Eros Beraldo
- 33. (Italy) Mario Bergamaschi
- 33. (Italy) Lorenzo Buffon
- 13. (Italy) Alfio Fontana
- 28. (Italy) Amleto Frignani
- 29. (Sweden) Nils Liedholm
- 28. (Italy) Cesare Maldini
- 35. (Sweden) Gunnar Nordahl
- 12. (Italy) Franco Pedroni
- 28. (Italy) Eduardo Ricagni
- 28. (Uruguay) Juan Alberto Schiaffino
- 27. (Italy) Arturo Silvestri
- 31. (Denmark) Jørgen Leschly Sørensen
- 1. (Italy) Omero Tognon
- 3. (Italy) Riccardo Toros
- 7. (Italy) Valentino Valli
- 3. (Italy) Albano Vicariotto
- 1. (Italy) Sandro Vitali
- 26. (Italy) Francesco Zagatti

==== Goalscorers ====
- 28. (Sweden) Gunnar Nordahl
- 15. (Uruguay) Juan Alberto Schiaffino
- 14. (Denmark) Jørgen Leschly Sørensen
- 8. (Italy) Eduardo Ricagni
- 7. (Italy) Amleto Frignani
- 7. (Sweden) Nils Liedholm
- 3. (Italy) Albano Vicariotto
- 1. (Italy) Mario Bergamaschi
- 1. (Italy) Cesare Maldini
- 1. (Italy) Valentino Valli
