= 1955–56 AC Milan season =

Milan Associazione Calcio
1955–56 season
- President: Andrea Rizzoli
- Manager: Héctor Puricelli
- Stadium: San Siro
- Serie A: 2nd
- European Cup: Semifinals
- Latin Cup: Winners
- Top goalscorer: League: Gunnar Nordahl (23); All: Gunnar Nordahl (27)
- Average home league attendance: 25,177
Home colours	Away colours

During the 1955–56 season Associazione Calcio Milan competed in Serie A, European Cup and Latin Cup.

== Summary ==
The 1955–1956 season saw Milan involved in three tournaments.

In the league, the club finished second in the standings, behind Fiorentina who dominated the season. At the end of the tournament there were 12 points between the Tuscans and Milan. Gunnar Nordahl was once again the top scorer of the club, but this time his 23 goals were not enough to conquer the Serie A top scorers' title.

In the European Cup, at its first edition, the club reached the semi-finals after victories against Saarbrücken in the round of 16 and Rapid Vienna in the quarter-finals, with aggregates of 7-5 and 8-3 respectively. In the semifinals, Milan faced Spanish Champions Real Madrid. In the first leg, played on Iberian soil, Los Blancos prevailed and won 4–2. In the return match, the 2–1 victory by the Devils was not enough to turn the tide in the aggregate.

In June 1956, the penultimate edition of the Latin Cup took place in Milan: the club won the trophy for the second time in four participations. In the semi-final, Benfica was beaten 4-2 and in the final Athletic Bilbao was defeated 3-1 thanks to goals from debutant Osvaldo Bagnoli, newcomer Giorgio Dal Monte and Juan Alberto Schiaffino.

At the end of the season, Nordahl, after 268 appearances and 221 goals (club record), two Scudetti, two Latin Cups and five Serie A top scorer titles (a record in Italian championships), left Milan and moved to Roma.

== Squad ==
Note: Flags indicate national team as defined under FIFA eligibility rules; some limited exceptions apply. Players may hold more than one non-FIFA nationality.

Pos.	Nation	Player
GK	ITA	Lorenzo Buffon
GK	ITA	Santino Ciceri
DF	ITA	Cesare Maldini
DF	ITA	Mario Bergamaschi
DF	ITA	Eros Fassetta
DF	ITA	Franco Pedroni
DF	ITA	Luigi Radice
DF	ITA	Francesco Zagatti
MF	ITA	Osvaldo Bagnoli
MF	ITA	Giorgio Dal Monte
MF	SWE	Nils Liedholm
MF	ITA	Gianfranco Ganzer

Pos.	Nation	Player
MF	ITA	Eduardo Ricagni
MF	ITA	Omero Tognon (Captain)
MF	ITA	Eros Beraldo
MF	ITA	Cesare Reina
MF	URU	Juan Alberto Schiaffino
MF	ITA	Amos Mariani
FW	ITA	Italo Carminati
FW	ITA	Amleto Frignani
FW	SWE	Gunnar Nordahl (Vice-captain)
FW	ITA	Valentino Valli
FW	ITA	Albano Vicariotto

=== Transfers ===
In
Pos.	Name	from	Type
MF	Osvaldo Bagnoli	Ausonia 1931	-
FW	Italo Carminati	Piacenza	-
FW	Giorgio Dal Monte	Genoa	-
DF	Gianfranco Ganzer	Triestina	-
FW	Amos Mariani	Fiorentina	-

Out
Pos.	Name	To	Type
DF	Alfio Fontana	Triestina	-
FW	Giancarlo Magnavacca	Cremonese	-
DF	Arturo Silvestri	Verona	-
FW	Jørgen Sørensen	Odense	-
GK	Riccardo Toros	Fiorentina	-
MF	Alessandro Vitali	Alessandria	-

== Competitions ==
=== Serie A ===
==== League table ====
Pos	Team	Pld	W	D	L	GF	GA	GD	Pts	Qualification or relegation
1	Fiorentina (C)	34	20	13	1	59	20	+39	53	Qualification for the European Cup preliminary round
2	Milan	34	16	9	9	70	48	+22	41	Qualified for the 1956 Latin Cup
3	Internazionale	34	16	7	11	57	36	+21	39	
3	Lazio	34	14	11	9	54	46	+8	39	
5	Bologna	34	15	7	12	68	52	+16	37	

Source: Panini
(C) Champions

==== Matches ====
18 September 1955 1	Atalanta	4–3	Milan	Bergamo
	Zagatti 5' (o.g.); Brugola 25', 55'; Longoni 52'		18' Schiaffino; 43' Mariani; 75' Nordahl	Stadium: Stadio Comunale; Attendance: 20,000; Referee: Liverani

25 September 1955 2	Milan	6–1	Sampdoria	Milan
	Nordahl 20', 73'; Dal Monte 29'; Schiaffino 42', 67'; Mariani 78'		3' (o.g.) Tognon	Stadium: Stadio San Siro; Attendance: 35,000; Referee: Maurelli

2 October 1955 3	Padova	1–5	Milan	Padova
	Pison 64'		1' Mariani; 26', 56' (pen.) Dal Monte; 40', 42' Nordahl	Stadium: Stadio Silvio Appiani; Attendance: 17,000; Referee: Jonni

9 October 1955 4	Milan	0–0	Napoli	Milan
				Stadium: Stadio San Siro; Attendance: 45,000; Referee: Rigato

16 October 1955 5	Inter	2–1	Milan	Milan
	Nesti 4'; Lorenzi 39'		35' Nordahl	Stadium: Stadio San Siro; Attendance: 87,000; Referee: Piemonte

23 October 1955 6	Triestina	1–3	Milan	Trieste
	Zaro 88'		5' Schiaffino; 64' Nordahl; 81' Valli	Stadium: Stadio Giuseppe Grezar; Attendance: 15,000; Referee: Jonni

30 October 1955 7	Milan	2–0	SPAL	Milan
	Nordahl 29', 81'			Stadium: Stadio San Siro; Attendance: 22,000; Referee: Moriconi

6 November 1955 8	Genoa	3–1	Milan	Genoa
	Pestrin 3'; Frizzi 68' (pen.); Carapellese 81'		78' Valli	Stadium: Stadio Luigi Ferraris; Attendance: 35,000; Referee: Orlandini

13 November 1955 9	Milan	0–0	Lanerossi Vicenza	Milan
				Stadium: Stadio San Siro; Attendance: 30,000; Referee: Bonetto

20 November 1955 10	Milan	0–2	Fiorentina	Milan
			13' Montuori; 15' Virgili	Stadium: Stadio San Siro; Attendance: 50,000; Referee: Liverani

8 December 1955 11	Pro Patria	1–1	Milan	Busto Arsizio
	La Rosa 67'		62' Nordahl	Stadium: Stadio Comunale; Attendance: 12,000; Referee: Rigato

25 December 1955 12	Milan	3–1	Juventus	Milan
	Ricagni 30'; Schiaffino 37', 67'		48' Colella	Stadium: Stadio San Siro; Attendance: 20,000; Referee: Lo Bello

1 January 1956 13	Novara	3–4	Milan	Novara
	Marzani 9', 78'; Savioni 83'		11', 71' Nordahl; 52' Ricagni; 59' Schiaffino	Stadium: Stadio Comunale; Attendance: 10,000; Referee: Jonni

8 January 1956 14	Milan	4–1	Roma	Milan
	Schiaffino 22'; Nordahl 26', 77'; Ricagni 71'		63' Nyers	Stadium: Stadio San Siro; Attendance: 25,000; Referee: Jonni

15 January 1956 15	Torino	1–1	Milan	Turin
	Moltrasio 26'		84' Mariani	Stadium: Stadio Filadelfia; Attendance: 30,000; Referee: Orlandini

22 January 1956 16	Milan	3–0	Bologna	Milan
	Dal Monte 26', 58'; Valli 81'			Stadium: Stadio San Siro; Attendance: 25,000; Referee: Marchese

29 January 1956 17	Lazio	2–3	Milan	Rome
	Muccinelli 49'; Olivieri 52'		15', 35' Dal Monte; 30' Liedholm	Stadium: Stadio Olimpico; Attendance: 40,000; Referee: Bernardi

12 February 1956 18	Milan	4–1	Atalanta	Milan
	Schiaffino 48', 89'; Dal Monte 51'; Nordhal 73'		88' Rozzoni	Stadium: Stadio San Siro; Attendance: 25,000; Referee: Bonetto

29 February 1956 19	Sampdoria	2–2	Milan	Genoa
	Tortul 35', 39'		7' Schiaffino; 29' Ricagni	Stadium: Stadio Luigi Ferraris; Attendance: 35,000; Referee: Jonni

26 February 1956 20	Milan	4–1	Padova	Milan
	Nordhal 9'; Pison 27' (o.g.); Dal Monte 39' (pen.); Ricagni 72'		69' Bonistalli	Stadium: Stadio San Siro; Attendance: 30,000; Referee: Moriconi

4 March 1956 21	Napoli	2–0	Milan	Naples
	Vinicio 70', 78'			Stadium: Stadio della Liberazione; Attendance: 40,000; Referee: Bernardi

11 March 1956 22	Milan	1–2	Inter	Milan
	Nordhal 67'		77', 81' Massei	Stadium: Stadio San Siro; Attendance: 45,000; Referee: Piemonte

18 March 1956 23	Milan	1–0	Triestina	Milan
	Schiaffino 90'			Stadium: Stadio San Siro; Attendance: 23,000; Referee: Grillo

25 March 1956 24	SPAL	0–0	Milan	Ferrara
				Stadium: Stadio Comunale; Attendance: 8,000; Referee: Moriconi

1 April 1956 25	Milan	3–2	Genoa	Milan
	Cardoni 1' (o.g.); Delfino 22' (o.g.); Schiaffino 53'		74', 78' Frizzi	Stadium: Stadio San Siro; Attendance: 20,000; Referee: Rigato

8 April 1956 26	Lanerossi Vicenza	1–3	Milan	Vicenza
	Buffon 47' (o.g.)		10' Dal Monte; 18' Valli; 90' Schiaffino	Stadium: Stadio Romeo Menti; Attendance: 12,000; Referee: Jonni

15 April 1956 27	Fiorentina	3–0	Milan	Florence
	Prini 16'; Virgili 37', 62'			Stadium: Stadio Comunale; Attendance: 75,000; Referee: Orlandini

29 April 1956 28	Milan	3–3	Pro Patria	Milan
	Nordhal 9', 64'; Dal Monte 35'		31', 70' Orzan; 50' Borsani	Stadium: Stadio San Siro; Attendance: 2,000; Referee: De Gregorio

6 May 1956 29	Juventus	0–0	Milan	Turin
				Stadium: Stadio Comunale; Attendance: 15,000; Referee: Roman

10 May 1956 30	Milan	4–2	Novara	Milan
	Nordhal 19', 48'; Schiaffino 68'; Bagnoli 69'		50' Piccioni; 51' Arce	Stadium: Stadio San Siro; Attendance: 10,000; Referee: Lo Bello

13 May 1956 31	Roma	0–0	Milan	Rome
				Stadium: Stadio Olimpico; Attendance: 35,000; Referee: Bonetto

20 May 1956 32	Milan	3–1	Torino	Milan
	Frignani 40'; Mariani 62'; Nordhal 75'		51' Pellis	Stadium: Stadio San Siro; Attendance: 17,000; Referee: Orlandini

27 May 1956 33	Bologna	2–1	Milan	Bologna
	Pozzan 40'; Cervellati 52'		75' Schiaffino	Stadium: Stadio Comunale; Attendance: 33,000; Referee: Friedl

3 June 1956 34	Milan	1–3	Lazio	Milan
	Nordhal 5'		7' Bettini; 10' (pen.) Carradori; 63' Muccinelli	Stadium: Stadio San Siro; Attendance: 10,000; Referee: Bonetto

=== European Cup ===
==== Round of 16 ====
1 November 1955 1	Milan	3–4	1. FC Saarbrücken	Milan
	Frignani 15'; Schiaffino 33'; Dal Monte 37'	Report	5' Krieger; 41' Philippi; 67' Schirra; 69' Martin	Stadium: Stadio San Siro; Attendance: 5,000; Referee: Dienst

23 November 1955 2	1. FC Saarbrücken	1–4	Milan	Saarbrücken
	Binkert 32'	Report	8', 76' Valli; 74' (o.g.) Puff; 86' Beraldo	Stadium: Stadion Kieselhumes; Attendance: 15,000; Referee: Schipper

==== Quarter-finals ====
18 January 1956 1	Rapid Wien	1–1	Milan	Vienna
	Korner 28' (pen.)	Report	20' Nordhal	Stadium: Pfarrwiese; Attendance: 22,000; Referee: Vlcek

12 February 1956 2	Milan	7–2	Rapid Wien	Milan
	Mariani 15'; Nordhal 22', 49'; Ricagni 26', 62'; Frignani 56'; Schiaffino 75'	Report	30' Golobic; 58' Dienst	Stadium: Stadio San Siro; Attendance: 20,000; Referee: Horn

==== Semifinals ====
19 April 1956 1	Real Madrid	4–2	Milan	Madrid
	Rial 6'; Joseito 25' (pen.); Olsen 40'; Di Stefano 63'	Report	9' Nordhal; 30' Schiaffino	Stadium: Estadio de Chamartín; Attendance: 120,000; Referee: Harzig

1 May 1956 2	Milan	2–1	Real Madrid	Milan
	Dal Monte 69' (pen.), 86' (pen.)	Report	65' Joseito	Stadium: Stadio San Siro; Attendance: 30,000; Referee: Steiner

=== Latin Cup ===
==== Semifinal ====
29 June 1956 1	Milan	4–2	Benfica	Milan
	Mariani 19'; Schiaffino 40', 58'; Bagnoli 73'		52' Coluna; 65' Caiado	Stadium: Arena Civica; Attendance: 5,000; Referee: Arqua

==== Final ====
3 July 1956 1	Milan	3–1	Athletic Bilbao	Milan
	Bagnoli 21'; Dal Monte 80'; Schiaffino 88'		50' Arteche	Stadium: Arena Civica; Attendance: 25,000; Referee: Guigue

== Statistics ==
=== Squad statistics ===
Competition	Points	Home						Away						Total						GD
Competition	Points	G	W	D	L	Gs	Ga	G	W	D	L	Gs	Ga	G	W	D	L	Gs	Ga	GD
1955–56 Serie A	41	17	11	3	3	42	20	17	5	6	6	28	28	34	16	9	9	70	48	+22
1955–56 European Cup	–	3	2	0	1	12	7	3	1	1	1	7	6	6	3	1	2	19	13	+6
1956 Latin Cup	–	2	2	0	0	7	3	0	0	0	0	0	0	2	2	0	0	7	3	+4
Total	–	22	15	3	4	61	30	20	6	7	7	35	34	42	21	10	11	96	64	+32

=== Players statistics ===
No.	Pos	Nat	Player	Total		Serie A		European Cup		Latin Cup	
No.	Pos	Nat	Player	Apps	Goals	Apps	Goals	Apps	Goals	Apps	Goals
	GK	(Italy) ITA	Santino Ciceri	2	-4	1	-3	1	-1	0	0
	GK	(Italy) ITA	Lorenzo Buffon	40	-60	33	-45	5	-12	2	-3
	DF	(Italy) ITA	Cesare Maldini	30	0	22	0	6	0	2	0
	DF	(Italy) ITA	Mario Bergamaschi	29	0	25	0	4	0	0	0
	FW	(Italy) ITA	Italo Carminati	6	0	5	0	1	0	0	0
	MF	(Sweden) SWE	Nils Liedholm	39	1	31	1	6	0	2	0
	DF	(Italy) ITA	Francesco Zagatti	33	0	27	0	4	0	2	0
	DF	(Italy) ITA	Eros Fassetta	2	0	1	0	0	0	1	0
	FW	(Italy) ITA	Amleto Frignani	22	3	18	1	2	2	2	0
	MF	(Italy) ITA	Amos Mariani	31	7	26	5	3	1	2	1
	FW	(Sweden) SWE	Gunnar Nordahl	37	27	32	23	5	4	0	0
	FW	(Italy) ITA	Albano Vicariotto	1	0	0	0	1	0	0	0
	MF	(Italy) ITA	Osvaldo Bagnoli	10	3	8	1	0	0	2	2
	FW	(Italy) ITA	Valentino Valli	13	6	11	4	2	2	0	0
	MF	(Italy) ITA	Gianfranco Ganzer	12	0	9	0	3	0	0	0
	MF	(Italy) ITA	Eros Beraldo	22	1	19	0	3	1	0	0
	MF	(Italy) ITA	Giorgio Dal Monte	28	15	21	11	5	3	2	1
	MF	(Uruguay) URU	Juan Alberto Schiaffino	37	22	29	16	6	3	2	3
	MF	(Italy) ITA	Eduardo Ricagni	20	7	17	5	3	2	0	0
	DF	(Italy) ITA	Luigi Radice	11	0	8	0	1	0	2	0
	DF	(Italy) ITA	Franco Pedroni	28	0	23	0	4	0	1	0
	MF	(Italy) ITA	Omero Tognon	9	0	8	0	1	0	0	0

== See also ==
- AC Milan

== Bibliography ==
- Almanacco illustrato del Milan, ed: 2, March 2005. Panini.
- Enrico Tosi. La storia del Milan, May 2005. Italia/Italy cid Tosi.
- Milan. Sempre con te, December 2009. Mondadori. 2009. ISBN 978-88-04-59118-4.
