= 1956–57 AC Milan season =

Associazione Calcio Milan
1956–57 season
- Chairman: Andrea Rizzoli
- Manager: Giuseppe Viani
- Stadium: San Siro
- Serie A: 1st (in European Cup)
- Latin Cup: 3º
- Top goalscorer: League: Bean (17); All: Bean (17)
- Average home league attendance: 30,487
Home colours	Away colours

During 1956–57 season Associazione Calcio Milan competed in Serie A and Latin Cup.

== Summary ==
After seven successful seasons and 221 goals scored, Gunnar Nordahl left the club to go and play with Roma. To make up for the Swedish striker, the club signed several players including Ernesto Cucchiaroni, Carlo Galli, Per Bredesen, Gastone Bean and brought Alfio Fontana back after a year on loan at Triestina. Change also occurred in the managerial role, where Giuseppe Viani replaced Héctor Puricelli.

The league saw Milan winning the title for the sixth time in its history. The Rossoneri could count on a squad that included, in addition to the aforementioned signings, Lorenzo Buffon, Cesare Maldini, Juan Alberto Schiaffino and Nils Liedholm, who became captain after the departure of Nordahl.

In the first few days Sampdoria took the lead, but was soon overtaken by Milan and Fiorentina. The Rossoneri. Bean and Cucchiaroni were suddenly struck by typhus and forced to spend much of the second half of the season confined to a clinic in Monza. This did not affect the progress of the team, which, on 17 March moved to a nine-points lead on Fiorentina and, controlling the standings until the end of the tournament, won its sixth scudetto with three rounds still to be played, trailing the Viola by 6 points.

In June, Milan also participated in the last edition of the Latin Cup, where they meet Real Madrid in the semifinals. The match recorded a defeat for the Devil by 5-1. In the match that assigned the third place, Milan beat Saint-Étienne by 4-3, thus gaining their second third place in this tournament which, together with the two successes in 1951 and 1956 (shared record) and the second place in 1953, makes Milan one of the most successful teams in this competition.

== Squad ==
Note: Flags indicate national team as defined under FIFA eligibility rules; some limited exceptions apply. Players may hold more than one non-FIFA nationality.

Pos.	Nation	Player
GK	ITA	Lorenzo Buffon (vice-captain)
GK	ITA	Narciso Soldan
DF	ITA	Cesare Maldini
DF	ITA	Luigi Radice
DF	ITA	Francesco Zagatti
MF	ITA	Osvaldo Bagnoli
MF	ITA	Eros Beraldo
MF	NOR	Per Bredesen
MF	ITA	Mario Bergamaschi
MF	ITA	Alfio Fontana
MF	SWE	Nils Liedholm (Captain)

Pos.	Nation	Player
MF	ITA	Cesare Reina
MF	ARG	Eduardo Ricagni
MF	URU	Juan Alberto Schiaffino
MF	ITA	Luigi Zannier
FW	ITA	Gastone Bean
FW	ARG	Ernesto Cucchiaroni
FW	ITA	Emiliano Farina
FW	ITA	Carlo Galli
FW	ITA	Amos Mariani
FW	ITA	Gianni Meanti

=== Transfers ===
In
Pos.	Name	from	Type
FW	Gastone Bean	Piacenza Calcio	-
MF	Per Bredesen	Udinese	-
FW	Ernesto Cucchiaroni	Boca Juniors	-
FW	Emiliano Farina	Treviso	-
DF	Alfio Fontana	Triestina	-
FW	Carlo Galli	A.S. Roma	-
FW	Walter Gómez	River Plate	-
FW	Gianni Meanti	Crema	-
GK	Narciso Soldan	Triestina	-
MF	Luigi Zannier	Atalanta B.C.	-

Out
Pos.	Name	To	Type
FW	Italo Carminati	Asssociazione Calcio Monza	-
GK	Santino Ciceri	Reggina	-
FW	Giorgio Dal Monte	Genoa Cricket and Football Club	-
FW	Giancarlo Danova	Spezia	-
DF	Eros Fassetta	Monza	-
MF	Amleto Frignani	Udinese	-
DF	Gianfranco Ganzer	Torino	-
FW	Gunnar Nordahl	A.S. Roma	-
DF	Franco Pedroni	Alessandria	-
MF	Omero Tognon	Pordenone	-
FW	Valentino Valli	Atalanta	-
FW	Albano Vicariotto	Palermo	-

== Competitions ==
=== Serie A ===
==== League table ====
Pos	Team	Pld	W	D	L	GF	GA	GD	Pts	Qualification or relegation
1	Milan (C)	34	21	6	7	65	40	+25	48	Qualification to European Cup and for the Latin Cup
2	Fiorentina	34	16	10	8	55	40	+15	42	
3	Lazio	34	14	13	7	52	40	+12	41	
4	Udinese	34	15	6	13	59	58	+1	36	
5	Internazionale	34	11	13	10	53	45	+8	35	

Source: Panini
(C) Champions

==== Matches ====
16 September 1956 1	Milan	2–1	Triestina	Milan
	Schiaffino 45', 60'	Report	4' (o.g.) Zannier	Stadium: San Siro; Attendance: 33,000; Referee: Mario Maurelli

23 September 1956 2	Bologna	1–2	Milan	Bologna
	Cervellati 26'	Report	21' Bredesen; 78' Galli	Stadium: Comunale; Attendance: 37,000; Referee: (Austria) Kainer

30 September 1956 3	Milan	1–0	Palermo	Milan
	Mariani 19'	Report		Stadium: San Siro; Attendance: 28,000; Referee: Canepa

7 October 1956 4	Milan	3–5	Napoli	Milan
	Schiaffino 61' (pen.), 86'; Galli 89'	Report	9' Posio; 19', 42' Pesaola; 27', 35' Vinício	Stadium: San Siro; Attendance: 65,000; Referee: Pietro Bonetto

14 October 1956 5	Padova	2–0	Milan	Padua
	Moro 57'; Paolo Coppola 85'	Report		Stadium: Stadio Silvio Appiani; Attendance: 18,000; Referee: (Austria) Stal

21 October 1956 6	Milan	1–1	Inter	Milan
	Bredesen 16'	Report	12' Pandolfini	Stadium: San Siro; Attendance: 60,000; Referee: Vincenzo Orlandini

28 October 1956 7	Fiorentina	0–3	Milan	Florence
		Report	31' (o.g.) Rosetta; 50' Schiaffino; 68' Bean	Stadium: Comunale; Attendance: 70,000; Referee: Concetto Lo Bello

18 November 1956 8	Milan	2–0	Udinese	Milan
	Bean 47'; Mariani 65'	Report		Stadium: San Siro; Attendance: 29 000; Referee: Canepa

25 November 1956 9	Juventus	0–1	Milan	Turin
		Report	86' Bredesen	Stadium: Comunale; Attendance: 35 000; Referee: (Austria) Friedrich Seipelt

2 December 1956 10	Atalanta	2–2	Milan	Bergamo
	Mion 35'; Longoni 80'	Report	12' Cucchiaroni; 86' Bean	Stadium: Comunale; Attendance: 32,000; Referee: Cesare Jonni

16 December 1956 11	Milan	3–2	Lazio	Milan
	Bean 34'; Cucchiaroni 67'; Galli 79'	Report	17', 57' Chiricallo	Stadium: San Siro; Attendance: 30000; Referee: Iginio Rigato

23 December 1956 12	Sampdoria	3–2	Milan	Genoa
	Conti 14', 77', 84'	Report	80' Bean; 82' Schiaffino	Stadium: Marassi; Attendance: 20000; Referee: Cesare Jonni

30 December 1956 13	Milan	2–0	Genoa	Milan
	Schiaffino 29', 60'	Report		Stadium: San Siro; Attendance: 15000; Referee: Menchini

6 January 1957 14	Milan	3–1	Torino	Milan
	Bean 22'; Grosso 36' (o.g.); Schiaffino 64'	Report	77' Tacchi	Stadium: San Siro; Attendance: 20000; Referee: Annoscia

13 January 1957 15	Roma	0–0	Milan	Rome
		Report		Stadium: Stadio Olimpico; Attendance: 55 000; Referee: Pietro Bonetto

20 January 1957 16	SPAL	1–3	Milan	Ferrara
	Zannier 29' (o.g.)	Report	25', 88' Galli; 47' Cucchiaroni	Stadium: Comunale; Attendance: 20 000; Referee: Concetto Lo Bello

27 January 1957 17	Milan	4–2	Lanerossi	Milan
	Bergamaschi 29'; Galli 43'; Bredesen 56'; Bean 87' (pen.)	Report	54' Lojacono; 58' (pen.) Manente	Stadium: San Siro; Attendance: 26 000; Referee: Moriconi

27 February 1957 18	Triestina	1–3	Milan	Trieste
	Clemente 75'	Report	25', 54' Bean; 55' Bredesen	Stadium: Comunale; Attendance: 10 000; Referee: (Austria) Grill

10 February 1957 19	Milan	1–0	Bologna	Milan
	Bean 28'	Report		Stadium: San Siro; Attendance: 35,000; Referee: (Austria) Friedrich Seipelt

17 February 1957 20	Palermo	1–2	Milan	Palermo
	Zamperlini 53'	Report	7' Bean; 64' Galli	Stadium: Stadio La Favorita; Attendance: 25,000; Referee: Moriconi

24 February 1957 21	Napoli	2–2	Milan	Naples
	Vinício 66', 87'	Report	37' Galli; 72' Bean	Stadium: Stadio della Liberazione; Attendance: 40 000; Referee: Cesare Jonni

3 March 1957 22	Milan	2–0	Padova	Milan
	Galli 42', 63'	Report		Stadium: San Siro; Attendance: 23,000; Referee: Angelini

10 March 1957 23	Inter	1–1	Milan	Milan
	Invernizzi 43'	Report	23' Bean	Stadium: San Siro; Attendance: 70 000; Referee: (Austria) Selpelt

17 March 1957 24	Milan	2–0	Fiorentina	Milan
	Galli 28', 81'	Report		Stadium: San Siro; Attendance: 65 000; Referee: Moriconi

24 March 1957 25	Udinese	2–1	Milan	Udine
	Frignani 7'; Lindskog 19'	Report	58' (pen.) Liedholm	Stadium: Stadio Moretti; Attendance: 20 000; Referee: Gennaro Marchese

31 March 1957 26	Milan	4–1	Juventus	Milan
	28' Farina; Galli 51'; Bredesen 53'; Liedholm 64' (pen.)	Report	79' Conti	Stadium: San Siro; Attendance: 40 000; Referee: Maurelli

7 April 1957 27	Milan	4–0	Atalanta	Milan
	Galli 6'; Liedholm 63' (pen.); Farina 79', 83'	Report		Stadium: San Siro; Attendance: 28 000; Referee: Iginio Rigato

14 April 1957 28	Lazio	3–0	Milan	Rome
	Vivolo 20' (pen.); Tozzi 36', 49'	Report		Stadium: Stadio Olimpico; Attendance: 45 000; Referee: Concetto Lo Bello

28 April 1957 29	Milan	2–1	Sampdoria	Milan
	Bean 44'; Farina 73'	Report	14' Firmani	Stadium: San Siro; Attendance: 25 000; Referee: Pietro Bonetto

5 May 1957 30	Genoa	0–1	Milan	Genoa
		Report	13' Bean	Stadium: Marassi; Attendance: 40 000; Referee: (Austria) Steiner

19 May 1957 31	Torino	2–2	Milan	Turin
	Arce 60'; Jeppson 78'	Report	79' Farina; 86' Bean	Stadium: Stadio Filadelfia; Attendance: 35 000; Referee: Iginio Rigato

2 June 1957 32	Milan	3–1	Roma	Milan
	Bean 29'; Liedholm 44' (pen.); Maldini 72'	Report	22' Da Costa	Stadium: San Siro; Attendance: 35000; Referee: Menchini

9 June 1957 33	Milan	0–1	SPAL	Milan
		Report	23' Di Giacomo	Stadium: San Siro; Attendance: 22 000; Referee: Cesare Jonni

16 June 1957 34	Lanerossi	3–1	Milan	Vicenza
	Savoini 52'; Lojacono 60'; Valentinuzzi 69'	Report	84' Bagnoli	Stadium: Stadio Romeo Menti; Attendance: 18,000; Referee: Moriconi

=== Latin Cup ===
==== Semifinals ====
20 June 1957	Real Madrid	5–1	Milan	Madrid
	Gento 20', 47', 85'; Di Stéfano 50'; Joseíto 83'	Report	30' Cucchiaroni	Stadium: Estadio Santiago Bernabéu; Attendance: 62,000; Referee: (France) Lequesne

==== Final 3º/4º place ====
23 June 1957	Milan	4–3	Saint-Etienne	Madrid
	Ricagni 18'; Mariani 42'; Bredesen 70'; Liedholm 88'	Report	9' Wicart; 78' Mekloufi; 85' Nyo Lea	Stadium: Estadio Santiago Bernabéu; Attendance: 65,000; Referee: (Portugal) Campos

== Statistics ==
=== Squad statistics ===
Competition	Points	Home						Away						Total						GD
Competition	Points	G	W	D	L	Gs	Ga	G	W	D	L	Gs	Ga	G	W	D	L	Gs	Ga	GD
Serie A	48	17	14	1	2	39	16	17	7	5	5	26	24	34	21	6	7	65	40	+25
Coppa Latina	-	-	-	-	-	-	-	-	-	-	-	-	-	2	1	0	1	5	8	-3
Total	-	17	14	1	2	39	16	17	7	5	7	26	24	36	22	6	8	70	48	+22

==== Appearances ====
- 10. (Italy) Osvaldo Bagnoli
- 25. (Italy) Gastone Bean
- 22. (Italy) Eros Beraldo
- 22. (Italy) Mario Bergamaschi
- 29. (Italy) Per Bredesen
- 18. (Italy) Lorenzo Buffon
- 15. (Italy) Ernesto Cucchiaroni
- 7. (Italy) Emiliano Farina
- 34. (Italy) Alfio Fontana
- 23. (Italy) Carlo Galli
- 28. (Sweden) Nils Liedholm
- 23. (Italy) Cesare Maldini
- 31. (Italy) Amos Mariani
- 2. (Italy) Gianni Meanti
- 3. (Italy) Luigi Radice
- 2. (Italy) Cesare Reina
- 2. (Italy) Eduardo Ricagni
- 29. (Uruguay) Juan Alberto Schiaffino
- 18. (Italy) Narciso Soldan
- 15. (Italy) Francesco Zagatti
- 36. (Italy) Luigi Zannier

==== Goalscorers ====
- 17. (Italy) Gastone Bean
- 14. (Italy) Carlo Galli
- 9. (Uruguay) Juan Alberto Schiaffino
- 7. (Italy) Per Bredesen
- 5. (Sweden) Nils Liedholm
- 4. (Italy) Ernesto Cucchiaroni
- 4. (Italy) Emiliano Farina
- 3. (Italy) Amos Mariani
- 1. (Italy) Osvaldo Bagnoli
- 1. (Italy) Mario Bergamaschi
- 1. (Italy) Cesare Maldini
- 1. (Italy) Eduardo Ricagni
