= 1953–54 AC Milan season =

Milan Associazione Calcio
1953–54 season
- President: Umberto Trabattoni
- Manager: Arrigo Morselli, then Béla Guttmann
- Stadium: San Siro
- Serie A: 3rd
- Top goalscorer: League: Gunnar Nordahl (23); All: Gunnar Nordahl (23)
- Average home league attendance: 18,910
Home colours	Away colours

During the 1953–54 season Associazione Calcio Milan competed in Serie A.

== Summary ==
For the 1953-1954 season, among Milan's main signings were those of the Danish Jørgen Sørensen and the Italians Mario Bergamaschi and Alberto Piccinini. Burini and Annovazzi, on the other hand, left the club after nine seasons. The captain became Omero Tognon.

The Rossoneri, led by Arrigo Morselli first and, following his dismissal due to results below expectations, by Béla Guttmann finished the Serie A season in third place, on equal points with Fiorentina and behind Inter and Juventus. The change of coach did not benefit the team, which played a championship with mixed results. With 23 goals Nordahl is the league's top scorer for the fourth time in five seasons.

At the end of the season Umberto Trabattoni resigned as president after 14 years at the helm of the club (nine of which as president): he will be remembered as the president of the first scudetto in 44 years.

== Squad ==
Note: Flags indicate national team as defined under FIFA eligibility rules; some limited exceptions apply. Players may hold more than one non-FIFA nationality.

Pos.	Nation	Player
GK	ITA	Lorenzo Buffon
GK	ITA	Ranieri Galluzzo
DF	ITA	Alfio Fontana
DF	ITA	Franco Pedroni
DF	ITA	Arturo Silvestri
DF	ITA	Francesco Zagatti
DF	ITA	Alvaro Moreno
MF	ITA	Eros Beraldo
MF	ITA	Mario Bergamaschi
MF	ITA	Stelio Darin
MF	SWE	Nils Liedholm

Pos.	Nation	Player
MF	ITA	Angelo Gandini
MF	ITA	Silvano Moro
MF	ITA	Omero Tognon (Captain)
MF	ITA	Alberto Piccinini
MF	ITA	Giancarlo Pistorello
FW	ITA	Amleto Frignani
FW	ITA	Angelo Longoni
FW	SWE	Gunnar Nordahl (vice-Captain)
FW	DEN	Jørgen Leschly Sørensen
FW	ITA	Valentino Valli
FW	ITA	Albano Vicariotto

=== Transfers ===
In
Pos.	Name	from	Type
FW	Jørgen Sørensen	Atalanta	-
MF	Mario Bergamaschi	Como	-
MF	Stelio Darin	Udinese	-
GK	Ranieri Galluzzo	Torviscosa	-
MF	Angelo Gandini	Marzotto Valdagno	-
DF	Silvano Moro	Udinese	-
MF	Alberto Piccinini	Juventus	-
FW	Albano Vicariotto	Padova	-

Out
Pos.	Name	To	Type
FW	Gunnar Gren	Fiorentina	-
MF	Carlo Annovazzi	Atalanta	-
FW	Renzo Burini	Lazio	-
MF	Celestino Celio	Roma	-
MF	Giovanni Marin	Catania	-
FW	Giuseppe Radaelli	Como	-
GK	Antonio Seveso	Catania	-
DF	Germano Travagini	Triestina	-

== Competitions ==
=== Serie A ===
==== League table ====
Pos	Team	Pld	W	D	L	GF	GA	GD	Pts	Qualification or relegation
1	Internazionale (C)	34	20	11	3	67	32	+35	51	
2	Juventus	34	20	10	4	58	34	+24	50	
3	Milan	34	17	10	7	66	39	+27	44	
3	Fiorentina	34	15	14	5	45	27	+18	44	
5	Napoli	34	13	12	9	52	38	+14	38	

Source: Panini
(C) Champions

==== Matches ====
13 September 1953 1	Udinese	2–2	Milan	Udine
	Virgili 50'; Beltrandi 62'		43' Sørensen; 69' Nordahl	Stadium: Stadio Moretti; Attendance: 11,000; Referee: Liverani

20 September 1953 2	Milan	0–0	Novara	Milan
				Stadium: Stadio San Siro; Attendance: 25,000; Referee: Marchese

27 September 1953 3	Sampdoria	2–1	Milan	Genoa
	Gotti 71'; Conti 76'		60' Frignani	Stadium: Stadio Luigi Ferraris; Attendance: 25,000; Referee: Massai

4 October 1953 4	Milan	4–0	Triestina	Milan
	Nordahl 44', 59'; Liedholm 62' (pen.), 77'			Stadium: Stadio San Siro; Attendance: 10,000; Referee: Corallo

11 October 1953 5	Napoli	0–1	Milan	Naples
			37' Liedholm	Stadium: Stadio del Vomero; Attendance: 40,000; Referee: Massai

18 October 1953 6	Palermo	1–4	Milan	Palermo
	Martegani 46'		18', 65', 76' Nordahl; 69' Sørensen	Stadium: Stadio La Favorita; Attendance: 22,000; Referee: Jonni

25 October 1953 7	Milan	3–3	Atalanta	Milan
	Frignani 6', 20'; Sørensen 86'		24' Angeleri; 39' Rasmussen; 77' Vittoni	Stadium: Stadio San Siro; Attendance: 13,000; Referee: Scaramella

1 November 1953 8	Inter	3–0	Milan	Milan
	Nyers 47', 53', 72' (pen.)			Stadium: Stadio San Siro; Attendance: 45,000; Referee: Agnolin

8 November 1953 9	Milan	3–0	Genoa	Milan
	Nordahl 17', 35'; Liedholm 76' (pen.)			Stadium: Stadio San Siro; Attendance: 22,000; Referee: Pieri

22 November 1953 10	Milan	3–1	Legnano	Milan
	Silvestri 33'; Vicariotto 50'; Sørensen 86'		71' Motta	Stadium: Stadio San Siro; Attendance: 15,000; Referee: Arpaia

29 November 1953 11	Torino	1–4	Milan	Turin
	Moltrasio 63' (pen.)		36' Nordahl; 37', 81' Sørensen; 85' (pen.) Liedholm	Stadium: Stadio Filadelfia; Attendance: 20,000; Referee: Bellè

6 December 1953 12	Fiorentina	0–0	Milan	Florence
				Stadium: Stadio Comunale; Attendance: 60,000; Referee: Jonni

20 December 1953 13	Milan	1–0	Juventus	Milan
	Sørensen 28'			Stadium: Stadio San Siro; Attendance: 42,000; Referee: Massai

27 December 1953 14	Bologna	2–1	Milan	Bologna
	Pivatelli 9'; Cappello 76'		12' (pen.) Liedholm	Stadium: Stadio Comunale; Attendance: 35,000; Referee: Massai

3 January 1954 15	Lazio	1–1	Milan	Rome
	Puccinelli 16'		44' (pen.) Liedholm	Stadium: Stadio Olimpico; Attendance: 45,000; Referee: Jonni

10 January 1954 16	Milan	6–1	SPAL	Milan
	Sørensen 41', 59', 86'; Nordahl 47'; Vicariotto 49'; Liedholm 68' (pen.)		62' De Vito	Stadium: Stadio San Siro; Attendance: 12,000; Referee: Scaramella

17 January 1954 17	Milan	1–2	Roma	Milan
	Vicariotto 72'		47' Bronée; 66' Ghiggia	Stadium: Stadio San Siro; Attendance: 35,000; Referee: Bellè

31 January 1954 18	Milan	2–1	Udinese	Milan
	Sørensen 63'; Nordahl 70'		69' Belrandi	Stadium: Stadio San Siro; Attendance: 14,000; Referee: Corallo

7 February 1954 19	Novara	1–1	Milan	Novara
	Piola 70'		68' Bergamaschi	Stadium: Stadio Comunale; Attendance: 5,000; Referee: Agnolin

14 February 1954 20	Milan	1–1	Sampdoria	Milan
	Nordahl 58'		10' Gotti	Stadium: Stadio San Siro; Attendance: 10,000; Referee: Marchese

21 February 1954 21	Triestina	0–6	Milan	Trieste
			16' (o.g.) Giannini; 46', 48', 74', 89' Nordahl; 81' Beraldo	Stadium: Stadio Comunale; Attendance: 10,000; Referee: Massai

28 February 1954 22	Milan	3–2	Napoli	Milan
	Nordahl 21'; Liedholm 31' (pen.); Beraldo 46'		14', 51' Ciccarelli	Stadium: Stadio San Siro; Attendance: 35,000; Referee: Bellè

7 March 1954 23	Milan	2–1	Palermo	Milan
	Liedholm 52'; Frignani 89'		66' De Grandi	Stadium: Stadio San Siro; Attendance: 25,000; Referee: Scaramella

14 March 1954 24	Atalanta	3–1	Milan	Bergamo
	Rasmussen 1', 10'; Villa 21'		50' Nordahl	Stadium: Stadio Comunale; Attendance: 7,000; Referee: Massai

21 March 1954 25	Milan	2–0	Inter	Milan
	Nordahl 33'; Sørensen 72'			Stadium: Stadio San Siro; Attendance: 55,000; Referee: Orlandini

28 March 1954 26	Genoa	2–2	Milan	Genoa
	Dal Monte 9' (pen.); De Angelis 86'		8' Nordahl; 44' Frignani	Stadium: Stadio Luigi Ferraris; Attendance: 25,000; Referee: Agnolin

4 April 1954 27	Legnano	2–2	Milan	Legnano
	Bercarich 33', 60'		35' Silvestri; 62' Sørensen	Stadium: Stadio Comunale; Attendance: 6,000; Referee: Agnolin

18 April 1954 28	Milan	0–1	Torino	Milan
			47' Biagioli	Stadium: Stadio San Siro; Attendance: 25,000; Referee: Maurelli

25 April 1954 29	Milan	2–1	Fiorentina	Milan
	Cervato 22' (o.g.); Nordahl 90'		57' Segato	Stadium: Stadio San Siro; Attendance: 45,000; Referee: Orlandini

2 May 1954 30	Juventus	1–0	Milan	Turin
	Hansen 11'			Stadium: Stadio Comunale; Attendance: 40,000; Referee: Maurelli

9 May 1954 31	Milan	2–1	Bologna	Milan
	Vicariotto 23'; Sørensen 60'		45' Cervellati	Stadium: Stadio San Siro; Attendance: 18,000; Referee: Arpaia

16 May 1954 32	Milan	3–2	Lazio	Milan
	Vicariotto 3'; Nordahl 38', 74'		66' (pen.) Vivolo; 80' A. Fontanesi	Stadium: Stadio San Siro; Attendance: 10,000; Referee: Piemonte

23 May 1954 33	SPAL	0–0	Milan	Ferrara
				Stadium: Stadio Comunale; Attendance: 20,000; Referee: Scaramella

30 May 1954 34	Roma	1–2	Milan	Rome
	Pandolfini 64'		30' Sørensen; 60' Beraldo	Stadium: Stadio Olimpico; Attendance: 50,000; Referee: Rigato

== Statistics ==
=== Squad statistics ===
Competition	Points	Home						Away						Total						GD
Competition	Points	G	W	D	L	Gs	Ga	G	W	D	L	Gs	Ga	G	W	D	L	Gs	Ga	GD
1953–54 Serie A	44	17	12	3	2	38	17	17	5	7	5	28	22	34	17	10	7	66	39	+27

=== Players statistics ===
No.	Pos	Nat	Player	Total		Serie A	
No.	Pos	Nat	Player	Apps	Goals	Apps	Goals
	GK	(Italy) ITA	Lorenzo Buffon	31	-36	31	-36
	DF	(Italy) ITA	Arturo Silvestri	32	2	32	2
	DF	(Italy) ITA	Mario Bergamaschi	25	1	25	1
	DF	(Italy) ITA	Francesco Zagatti	30	0	30	0
	MF	(Italy) ITA	Omero Tognon	34	0	34	0
	MF	(Italy) ITA	Eros Beraldo	20	3	20	3
	MF	(Italy) ITA	Alberto Piccinini	19	0	19	0
	MF	(Sweden) SWE	Nils Liedholm	31	10	31	10
	FW	(Sweden) SWE	Gunnar Nordahl	33	23	33	23
	FW	(Denmark) DEN	Jørgen Sørensen	34	15	34	15
	FW	(Italy) ITA	Amleto Frignani	31	5	31	5
	GK	(Italy) ITA	Ranieri Galluzzo	3	-3	3	-3
	FW	(Italy) ITA	Albano Vicariotto	15	5	15	5
	MF	(Italy) ITA	Silvano Moro	12	0	12	0
	DF	(Italy) ITA	Franco Pedroni	11	0	11	0
	FW	(Italy) ITA	Angelo Longoni	7	0	7	0
	DF	(Italy) ITA	Alvaro Moreno	2	0	2	0
	DF	(Italy) ITA	Alfio Fontana	1	0	1	0
	MF	(Italy) ITA	Stelio Darin	1	0	1	0
	MF	(Italy) ITA	Angelo Gandini	1	0	1	0
	MF	(Italy) ITA	Giancarlo Pistorello	1	0	1	0

== See also ==
- AC Milan

== Bibliography ==
- Almanacco illustrato del Milan, ed: 2, March 2005. Panini.
- Enrico Tosi. La storia del Milan, May 2005. Italia/Italy cid Tosi.
- Milan. Sempre con te, December 2009. Mondadori. 2009. ISBN 978-88-04-59118-4.
