= Cesare Maldini =

Italian footballer (1932–2016)

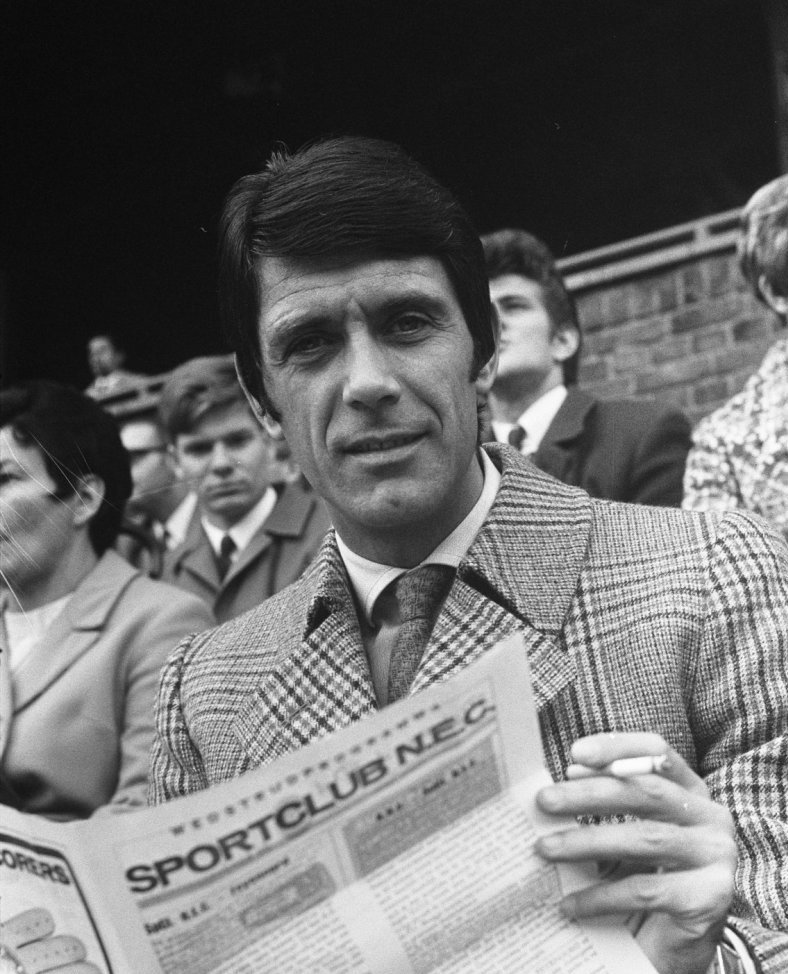
- Maldini in 1969

Personal information
- Full name: Cesare Maldini
- Date of birth: 5 February 1932
- Place of birth: Trieste, Kingdom of Italy
- Date of death: 3 April 2016 (aged 84)
- Place of death: Milan, Italy
- Height: 1.83 m (6 ft 0 in)
- Position: Defender

Youth career
- 1950–1952: Triestina

Senior career*
Years	Team	Apps	(Gls)
1952–1954	Triestina	32	(0)
1954–1966	AC Milan	347	(3)
1966–1967	Torino	33	(0)
Total		412	(3)

International career
1960–1963	Italy	14	(0)

Managerial career
- 1967–1972: AC Milan (assistant)
- 1972–1974: AC Milan
- 1974–1976: Foggia
- 1976–1977: Ternana
- 1978–1980: Parma
- 1980–1986: Italy (assistant)
- 1986–1996: Italy U21
- 1996–1998: Italy
- 2001: AC Milan (interim)
- 2001–2002: Paraguay
Medal record
Men's football
Representing Italy (as manager)
UEFA European Under-21 Championship
Winner	1992
Winner	1994
Winner	1996
- * Club domestic league appearances and goals

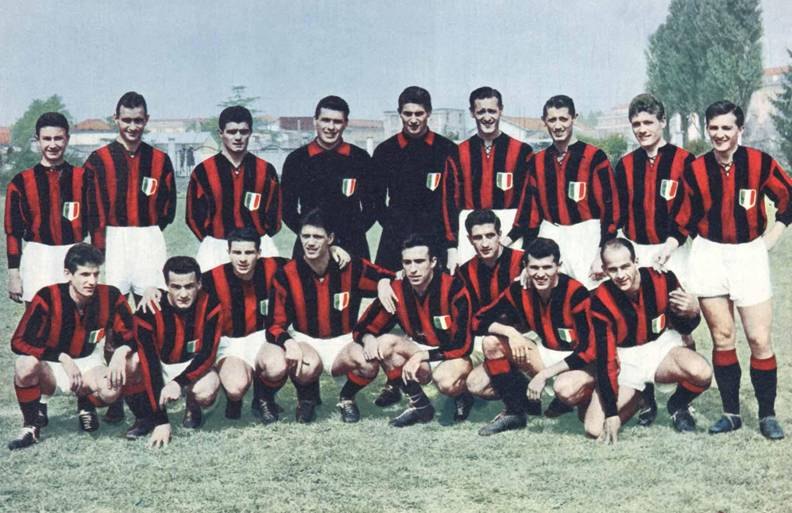
The AC Milan squad for the 1957–58 season. From left to right, standing: Cesare Reina, Carlo Galli, Alfio Fontana, Narciso Soldan, Lorenzo Buffon, Nils Liedholm, Juan Alberto Schiaffino, Luigi Radice, Gastone Bean; crouched: Eros Beraldo, Ernesto Grillo, Amos Mariani, Cesare Maldini, Mario Bergamaschi, Luigi Zannier, Francesco Zagatti, Ernesto Cucchiaroni.

Cesare Maldini (Italian pronunciation: [ˈtʃeːzare malˈdiːni, ˈtʃɛː-]; 5 February 1932 – 3 April 2016) was an Italian professional football manager and player who played as a defender.

Father to Paolo Maldini and grandfather to Daniel Maldini, Cesare began his career with Italian side Triestina, before transferring to AC Milan in 1954, whom he captained to win four Serie A league titles, one European Cup and one Latin Cup during his twelve seasons with the club. He retired in 1967, after a season with Torino. Internationally, he played for Italy, earning 14 caps and participating in the 1962 World Cup. He served as team captain for both Milan and Italy.

As a manager, he also coached his former club Milan on two occasions, as well as Italian sides Foggia, Ternana and Parma. He had a successful career in charge of the Italy under-21 side, winning the European Under-21 Championship a record three consecutive times; he later also coached the Italy senior team at the 1998 FIFA World Cup, and the Paraguay national football team at the 2002 FIFA World Cup.

== Early and personal life ==
The son of Albino Maldini, a sailor, and Maria Vodeb, Cesare Maldini was born in Trieste, Friuli-Venezia Giulia, Italy. His family was of mixed Italian-Slovenian descent. He married Maria Luisa (Marisa; née Mazzucchelli, 1939–2016) in 1962; together they had six children: three sons and three daughters. One of his sons, Paolo, also had a successful football career as a defender with Milan, and also once held the record for the most caps for the Italy national team (now third behind Gianluigi Buffon and Fabio Cannavaro). Paolo Maldini captained Milan to the UEFA Champions League title in 2003 and 2007, and won the trophy five times in total. Maldini's grandsons Christian and Daniel played football in the Milan academy, with Christian last playing in Serie C and Daniel currently playing at Atalanta.

The young Maldini also studied to be a dental technician in case he didn't succeed in football.

== Club career ==
Maldini began his playing career with local side Triestina, in 1952, and made his Serie A debut in his first season with the club, on 24 May 1953, in a 0–0 away draw against Palermo. After two seasons with Triestina, Maldini transferred to AC Milan in 1954, where he went on to achieve notable successes both domestically and internationally in the team's starting line-up, also becoming an important figure at the club. He made his debut with the club on 19 September 1954, in a 4–0 league win over his former side, featuring in a Milan team which included several important players at the time, such as Lorenzo Buffon, Francesco Zagatti, Nils Liedholm, Gunnar Nordahl, and Juan Alberto Schiaffino; he immediately broke into the first team and won his first league title in his debut season with the squad. In total, he made 347 appearances for Milan in Serie A, scoring 3 goals, and made 412 appearances for the club in all competitions. Maldini won four league titles with Milan, and also later became the team's captain in 1961, a role which he held for five years, until he left the club, and was succeeded by Gianni Rivera. During his time with Milan, he won a Latin Cup in 1956 and then went on to capture the club's first ever European Cup as team captain in 1963, as Milan defeated Benfica 2–1 at Wembley Stadium on 22 May, with two goals from José Altafini; as a result, Milan became the first Italian side ever to win the trophy, while Maldini became the first Italian captain to lift the cup. He made his final appearance for Milan on 22 May 1966, in a 6–1 home win over Catania, in Serie A. In 1966 he moved to Torino for a season, before retiring in 1967; he made his final Serie A appearance on 28 May, in a 2–1 away defeat to Napoli.

== International career ==
At international level Maldini earned 14 caps for the Italy national football team between 1960 and 1963, also serving as the national team's captain between 1962 and 1963, but was less successful than with Milan. He made his debut on 6 January 1960, in a 3–0 win over Switzerland in the 1955–60 Central European International Cup, and later took part in the 1962 FIFA World Cup with Italy, making two appearances in the competition. The team suffered a disappointing and controversial first-round elimination, although he was named to the team of the tournament for his performances. He made his final appearance for Italy in a European championship qualifier in Moscow, in 1963, as Italy suffered a 2–0 away defeat to the Soviet Union.

== Style of play ==
Maldini was a defender noted for his aerial ability, technique, passing range, anticipation and timing of challenges. During his career, he received five yellow cards and was sent off only once. Maldini a tactically versatile player, although he was usually used as a man-marking centre-back, or as a sweeper, he was also capable of functioning as a full-back on either side of the pitch due to his stamina and agility on the pitch, but was usually fielded on the right flank when played in this position; he was even used as a defensive midfielder on occasion, due to his tendency to advance into midfield when in possession of the ball and start attacking plays from the back. Despite his reputation as a world-class defender, in his early career Maldini was at times also known for being overly confident in possession, and for having a penchant to take risks when carrying or playing the ball out of the defence, due to his passing accuracy and ability on the ball; this tendency occasionally led to sporadic and atypical defensive errors, which were later dubbed Maldinate by the Italian media.

== Managerial career ==
=== Early career ===
After retiring from playing, Maldini became a coach, starting his career as an assistant manager for Nereo Rocco at Milan in 1970, and later also coached the team between 1972 and 1974, while Rocco served as the club's technical director. Maldini's first official match as Milan's head coach came on 6 September 1972, in a 4–1 away win over FA Red Boys Differdange in the Cup Winners' Cup; Maldini won a Coppa Italia and a Cup Winners' Cup double in 1973, and also narrowly missed out on the league title that season. However, Milan also suffered a 6–1 defeat on aggregate to Ajax in the European Super Cup; this was the worst defeat for an Italian team in an UEFA competition final. He was sacked by the club in 1974, following a disappointing 2–1 defeat to Verona on 6 April, and was replaced by Giovanni Trapattoni for the final few games of the season. He later went on to coach Foggia (1974–1976), Ternana (1976–77), and Serie C1 side Parma (1978–80), helping the team to obtain Serie B promotion during his tenure with the club, after managing a second-place finish in the league during the 1978–79 Serie C1 season.

Between 1980 and 1986, he was one of Enzo Bearzot's assistants for the Italy national team, and even served as his assistant manager during the 1982 FIFA World Cup in Spain, which Italy won.

=== Italy under-21 coach ===
Maldini took charge of the Italian Under-21 side in 1986, and coached the team for ten years, winning the European Under-21 Championship tournament a record three consecutive times between 1992 and 1996. As Italy's Under-21 coach, Maldini was also known as a mentor for many of the team's players, who later stated that he played a key role in their development; indeed, former protégés Fabio Cannavaro, Gianluigi Buffon and Francesco Totti from Maldini's 1996 Under-21 European Championship-winning squad went on to win the 2006 FIFA World Cup. He also coached the Italian Olympic teams that took part at the 1992 and 1996 Summer Olympics.

=== 1998 World Cup with the Italy senior team ===
Following his successes with the Under-21 side, Maldini took charge of the senior team in December 1996, replacing Arrigo Sacchi. After taking over as the national team's manager, he helped Italy to a crucial 1–0 away victory over England at Wembley Stadium on 12 February 1997, and successfully aided the team to qualify for the 1998 FIFA World Cup undefeated through the play-offs against Russia. Under Maldini, Italy were one of the four teams who also took part in the 1997 Tournoi de France friendly tournament, against his wishes, in preparation for the 1998 World Cup; Italy finished in last place, suffering a 2–0 loss in the opening match against England, and subsequently drawing 3–3 and 2–2 with Brazil and hosts France respectively.

Despite initially struggling in qualification, the Italian media and fans had great expectations of the 1998 side, which included a strong defence, and several prolific attacking players, such as Christian Vieri, Alessandro Del Piero and Filippo Inzaghi, among others, in their prime. Cesare Maldini's son, Paolo, was captain of the team. Italy were drawn in Group B of the tournament with Chile, Cameroon and Austria. They won their group, drawing 2–2 with Chile in their opening game, and then beating Cameroon 3–0 and Austria 2–1. Advancing to the Round of 16, Italy then beat Norway 1–0 to secure a spot in the quarter-finals against tournament hosts France. After a goalless draw, Italy were eventually eliminated by the eventual champions on penalties.

Although Italy did not lose a match at the World Cup, Maldini resigned after the tournament due to heavy criticism in the Italian media over his allegedly ultra-defensive and "old-fashioned" catenaccio-inspired tactics, which included the use of a traditional man-marking defensive back-line, as well as a sweeper. He was also condemned for leaving Gianfranco Zola out of the squad, and for his reluctance to field creative forwards Roberto Baggio and Alessandro Del Piero alongside each other in the front-line, opting instead to have one player come on for the other in the second half; these controversial substitutions were compared to those made between Sandro Mazzola and Gianni Rivera by Ferruccio Valcareggi, the Italian manager at the 1970 World Cup.

=== Milan return and 2002 World Cup with Paraguay ===
After serving as a head scout for his former team Milan from February 1999, Maldini briefly returned to coach the Milan first team in March 2001, serving as an interim manager for the club (whose captain was his son, Paolo) alongside youth coach Mauro Tassotti, following Alberto Zaccheroni's sacking, and led the squad for their final games of the season. Although the club endured a disappointing season, finishing in sixth place and failing to qualify for the Champions League, Maldini did lead the team to a memorable 6–0 victory over cross-city rivals Inter in the Milan Derby on 11 May; the result was Inter's worst-ever home defeat in Serie A, and Milan's biggest league win in the Derby. After helping the club to qualify for the UEFA Cup, Maldini was replaced by Fatih Terim the following season, although he initially remained with the club as an advisor to the coach.

In January 2002, Maldini became coach of Paraguay. His appointment caused some controversy as domestic managers were overlooked (prompting the managers union to try to unsuccessfully expel him for immigration breaches), and because he spoke little Spanish. Maldini nonetheless had the support of star goalkeeper José Luis Chilavert and several other senior players. He took over the team which had already qualified for the 2002 World Cup hosted by South Korea and Japan; at the age of 70, he became, what was at the time, the oldest coach to ever be in charge of a national side at a World Cup tournament (his son Paolo captained Italy in the same tournament); this record was later broken by Greece's coach Otto Rehhagel in the 2010 World Cup.

Despite missing Chilavert for the first game due to suspension, Paraguay managed to advance from Group B to the Round of 16, after a 2–2 draw with South Africa, a 3–1 defeat from Spain, and a 3–1 victory over Slovenia. In the Round of 16, Paraguay were eliminated by the finalist Germany, losing 1–0 thanks to an 89th-minute goal by Oliver Neuville.

== Style of management ==
From a tactical standpoint, Maldini was known for his cautious, traditional, pragmatic, and conservative approach as a manager. A proponent of the zona mista or gioco all'italiana system, which combined aspects of both zonal defence and man-to-man marking, he used a solid, defensive-minded system, in particular as the head coach of the Italian senior national side; the system was inspired by catenaccio, which had been widely used by his mentor, Nereo Rocco, and zona mista was even seen as an evolution of this system. As Maldini preferred to build his team on a very strong back-line, he often fielded a fluid 3–5–2 or 5–3–2 formation, but which usually employed a sweeper (or "libero," in Italian) and two man-marking centre-backs (or "stopper," in Italian) in front of the goalkeeper, as well as two wing-backs flanking a midfield trio featuring two central box-to-box midfielders or mezzali, with a deep-lying playmaker or regista in the centre. However, at times, he would also use a 4–4–2 formation, either with a sweeper behind three man-marking centre-backs in defence, or with a more common flat four-man defensive line and a zonal marking system, with two centre-backs, a left-back, and a right-back. His teams were often known for being very compact defensively and for their tight and physical marking of opponents, both in defence and in midfield. They would often play on the counter-attack, preferring to focus on obtaining results and conceding few opportunities, rather than producing an attacking-minded or attractive playing style. (Note: See) In attack, he usually paired two forwards who would complement each other alongside one another, namely a traditionally large, physical, and prolific centre-forward – such as Christian Vieri – with a smaller, faster, creative and more technical second striker – such as Roberto Baggio or Alessandro Del Piero. He often preferred to rotate his second strikers so as not to offset the balance within the team. On rare occasions, however, he also employed an attacking trident, or two forwards supported by an attacking midfielder playing behind them in a 4–3–1–2 formation.

== After retirement ==
After the 2002 World Cup, Maldini returned to AC Milan as a talent scout for the Rossoneri. He also later worked as a sports analyst for several radio stations and sports channels, such as beIN SPORTS, and also for Al Jazeera in 2012, with Alessandro Altobelli.

== Death ==
Maldini died on 3 April 2016 at the age of 84. In his honour, a minute of silence was held before every league game in Italy that weekend, while Milan players wore black armbands in their match against Atalanta. Maldini's grandson, Christian, also captained the youth team in a friendly match in his honour. Maldini's funeral service was held on 5 April, at the Basilica of Sant'Ambrogio, in Milan, and was attended by several important footballing figures. His wife died later that year, on 28 July, just over three months after him.

== Career statistics ==
=== Club ===
Appearances and goals by club, season and competition
Club	Season	League			Cup		Europe (Note: Appearances in the UEFA European Cup and UEFA Cup Winners' Cup)		Other		Total	
Club	Season	Division	Apps	Goals	Apps	Goals	Apps	Goals	Apps	Goals	Apps	Goals
Triestina	1952–53	Serie A	1	0	–	–	–	–	–	–	1	0
Triestina	1953–54	Serie A	31	0	–	–	–	–	–	–	31	0
Triestina	Total		32	0	0	0	0	0	0	0	32	0
AC Milan	1954–55	Serie A	27	1	–	–	–	–	1	0	28	1
AC Milan	1955–56	Serie A	22	0	–	–	6	0	2	0	30	0
AC Milan	1956–57	Serie A	21	1	–	–	–	–	2	0	23	1
AC Milan	1957–58	Serie A	32	0	3	0	8	0	–	–	43	0
AC Milan	1958–59	Serie A	34	0	1	0	–	–	1	0	36	0
AC Milan	1959–60	Serie A	29	0	–	–	4	0	1	0	34	0
AC Milan	1960–61	Serie A	30	0	2	0	–	–	2	0	34	0
AC Milan	1961–62	Serie A	34	1	–	–	2	0	–	–	36	1
AC Milan	1962–63	Serie A	31	0	1	0	9	0	2	0	43	0
AC Milan	1963–64	Serie A	22	0	1	0	3	0	3	0	29	0
AC Milan	1964–65	Serie A	34	0	–	–	2	0	–	–	36	0
AC Milan	1965–66	Serie A	31	0	1	0	8	0	–	–	40	0
AC Milan	Total		347	3	9	0	42	0	14	0	412	3
Torino	1966–67	Serie A	33	0	3	0	–	–	3	0	39	0
Career total			412	3	12	0	42	0	17	0	483	3

=== International ===
Appearances and goals by national team and year
National team	Year	Apps	Goals
Italy	1960	1	0
Italy	1961	3	0
Italy	1962	6	0
Italy	1963	4	0
Total		14	0

== Honours ==
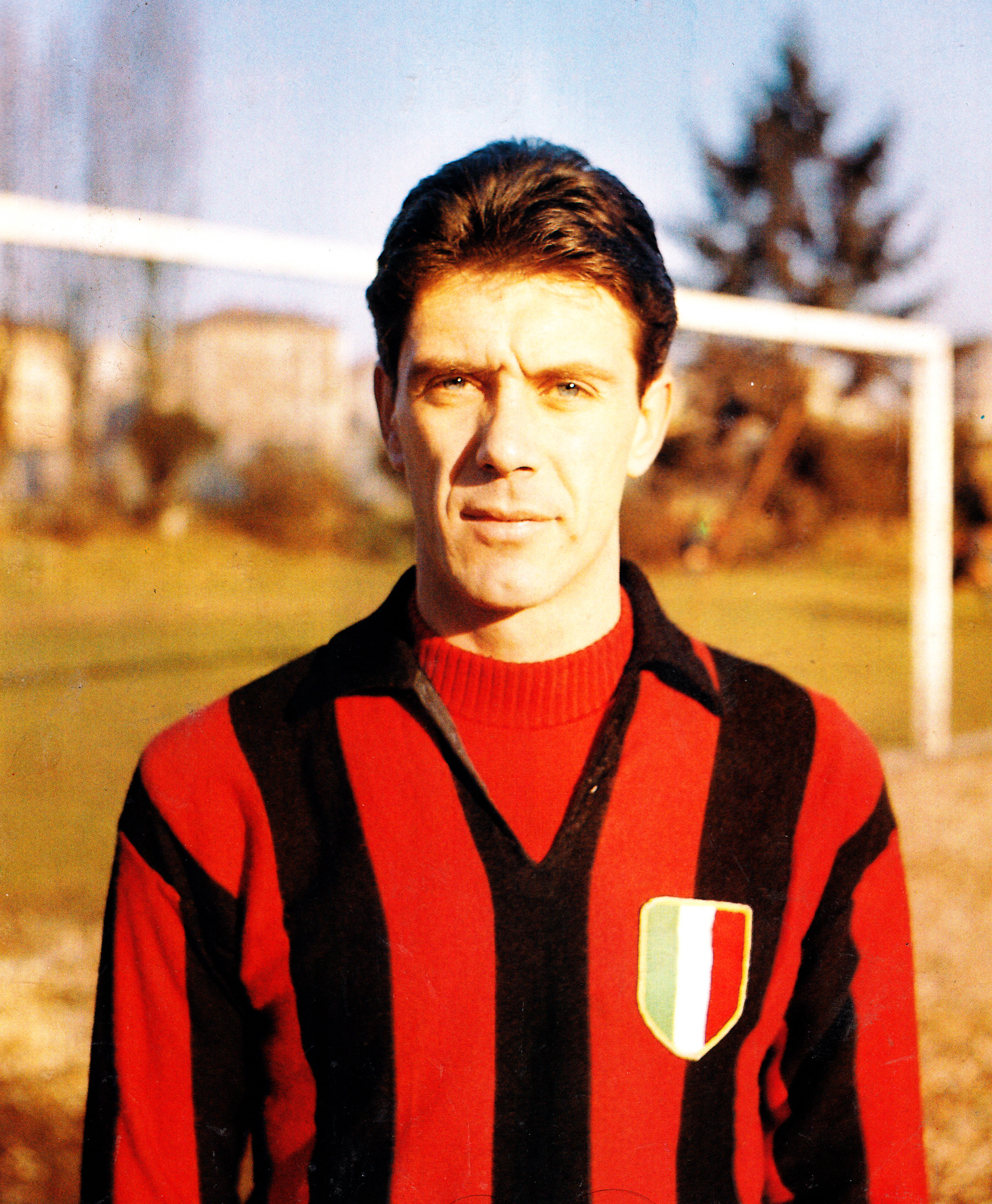
Maldini with AC Milan in the 1959-60 season

=== Player ===
AC Milan

- Serie A: 1954–55, 1956–57, 1958–59, 1961–62
- European Cup: 1962–63
- Latin Cup: 1956

Individual

- FIFA World Cup All-Star Team: 1962
- World Soccer World XI: 1963
- Panchina d'Oro Career Award: 1996
- AC Milan Hall of Fame
- Italian Football Hall of Fame: 2016

=== Manager ===
AC Milan

- Coppa Italia: 1972–73
- European Cup Winners' Cup: 1972–73

Italy U21

- UEFA European Under-21 Championship: 1992, 1994, 1996
