= Lorenzo Buffon =

Italian footballer (1929–2025)

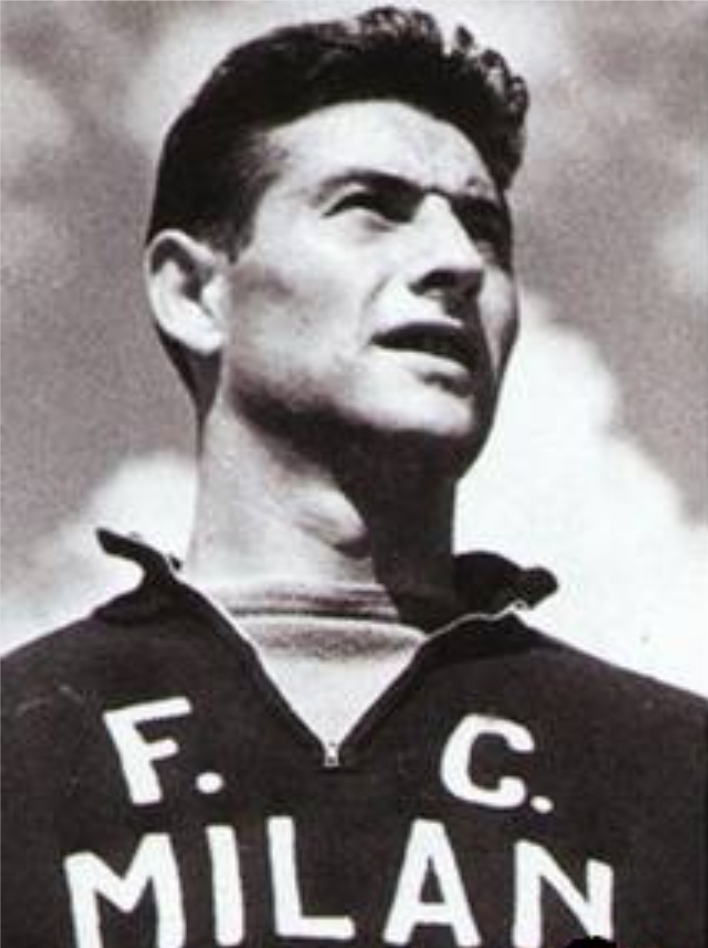
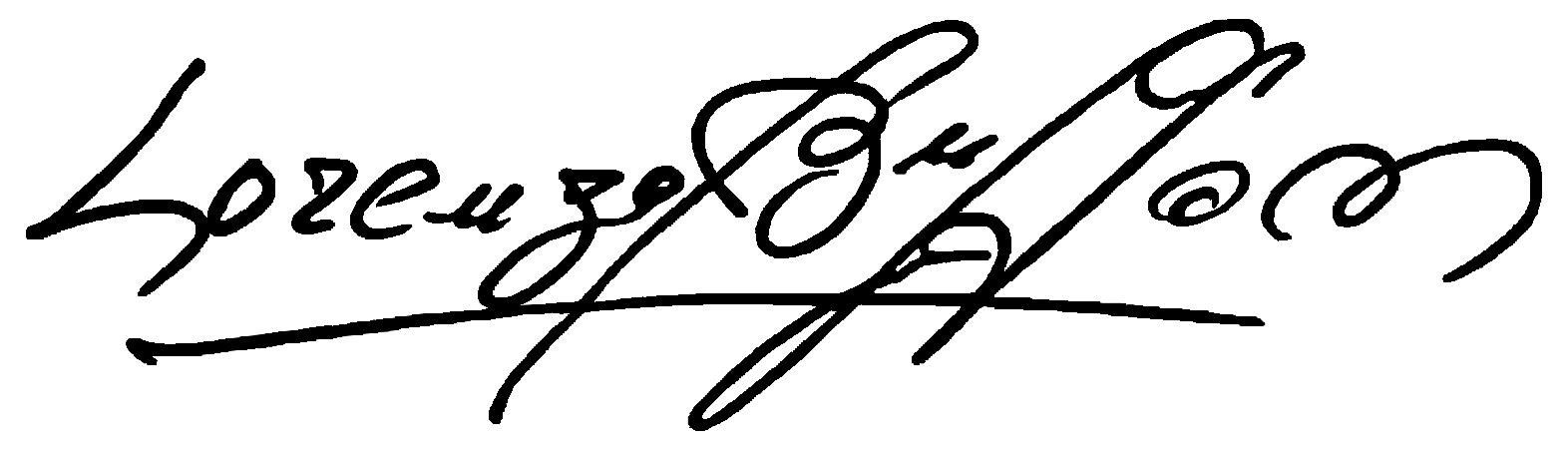
- Buffon at AC Milan Signature Lorenzo Buffon (1929–2025)

Personal information
- Date of birth: 19 December 1929
- Place of birth: Majano, Kingdom of Italy
- Date of death: 25 November 2025 (aged 95)
- Place of death: Latisana, Italy
- Height: 1.81 m (5 ft 11 in)
- Position: Goalkeeper

Senior career*
Years	Team	Apps	(Gls)
1948–1949	Portogruaro	34	(0)
1949–1959	AC Milan	277	(0)
1959–1960	Genoa	20	(0)
1960–1963	Inter Milan	79	(0)
1963–1964	Fiorentina	1	(0)
1964–1965	Ivrea	11	(0)
Total		422	(0)

International career
1958–1962	Italy	15	(0)
- * Club domestic league appearances and goals

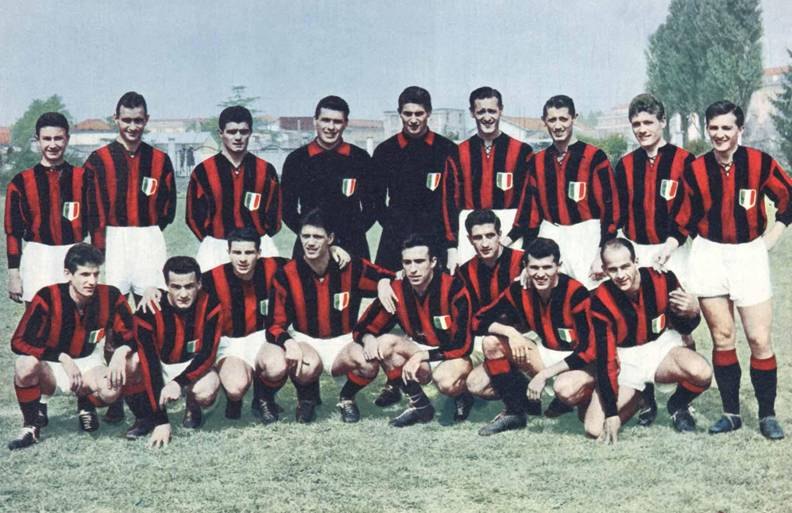
The AC Milan squad for the 1957–58 season. From left to right, standing: Cesare Reina, Carlo Galli, Alfio Fontana, Narciso Soldan, Lorenzo Buffon, Nils Liedholm, Juan Alberto Schiaffino, Luigi Radice, Gastone Bean; crouched: Eros Beraldo, Ernesto Grillo, Amos Mariani, Cesare Maldini, Mario Bergamaschi, Luigi Zannier, Francesco Zagatti, Ernesto Cucchiaroni.

Lorenzo Buffon (Italian pronunciation: [loˈrɛntso bufˈfon, -fɔn], Friulian: [buˈfoŋ]; 19 December 1929 – 25 November 2025) was an Italian footballer who played as a goalkeeper. Throughout his career, he played 277 times for Italian club AC Milan, and also later played for their city rivals Inter Milan, as well as other Italian clubs, winning five Serie A titles. At the international level, he was capped for the Italian international side on 15 occasions, representing his country at the 1962 FIFA World Cup.

Buffon is widely regarded as one of the greatest goalkeepers of his generation, and as one of Italy's greatest goalkeepers. Alongside goalkeeper Lev Yashin, he was chosen to represent the FIFA All-Star squad during the 1960s.

== Club career ==
Born on 19 December 1929 in Majano, in the province of Udine, overall, Buffon played 15 seasons (365 games) in the Serie A for AC Milan (1949–59), Genoa (1959–60), Inter Milan (1960–63), and Fiorentina (1963–64). He began his career with Portogruaro in 1948 before moving to Milan the following season. With Milan, he made his Serie A debut on 15 January 1950, keeping a clean sheet in a 1–0 home win over Sampdoria; he played 277 games for the club, and gained international prominence as he won four Serie A titles, and two Latin Cups, despite competition for a place in the starting line-up with fellow keeper Narciso Soldan. With Milan, Buffon also reached the final of the 1957–58 European Cup, and the semi-finals of the 1955–56 European Cup, where the Italian club was defeated by eventual champions Real Madrid on both occasions. With 300 appearances for Milan, he is one of only four goalkeepers in the club's history to have reached this milestone, behind only Christian Abbiati (380), Sebastiano Rossi (330), and Dida (302).

In his later career, Buffon first joined Genoa for a season in 1959, and subsequently moved to Milan's cross-city rivals Inter in 1960, on both occasions as a replacement for his perceived career rival, Giorgio Ghezzi, who had instead joined Buffon's former club Milan in 1959. With Inter, Buffon won another Serie A title during the 1962–63 season under manager Helenio Herrera, who would coach Inter to greater domestic and European successes in later years. During his three seasons with Inter, he also reached the semi-finals of the 1960–61 Inter-Cities Fairs Cup, although his best placement in the Coppa Italia was a quarter-final finish. In total, Buffon won five Serie A titles throughout his career. After spending a season with Fiorentina, making only a single appearance in the league, he retired after a season with Ivrea in 1965.

== International career ==
Buffon was also capped 15 times for the Italy national team between 1958 and 1962; he made his international debut in a 2–2 friendly home draw against France, on 9 September 1958, and later represented his country as their captain and starting goalkeeper in the 1962 FIFA World Cup in Chile. He made two appearances throughout the tournament, keeping two clean sheets in a 0–0 draw against West Germany, and in a 3–0 win over Switzerland on 7 June, his final international appearance, while he was replaced in goal by Carlo Mattrel for Italy's second group match against hosts Chile, which ended in a 2–0 defeat. Italy were controversially eliminated in the first round of the tournament.

== Style of play ==
An athletic yet effective and reliable goalkeeper, Buffon was known in particular for his positional sense, handling, and efficient style of goalkeeping, which enabled him to produce acrobatic saves without having to resort to histrionics; his spectacular shot-stopping abilities earned him the nickname Lorenzo il Magnifico. Although he was a fairly tall and physically strong keeper, he was less effective at coming off his line to collect crosses, and performed better between the posts. Despite his reputation as a generally solid and world-class keeper, he was also occasionally criticised throughout his career for being inconsistent, and for his mindset, as well as for letting his mentality affect his performances at times.

== Personal life and death ==
Following his retirement from professional football, Buffon worked as a youth talent scout for Milan. His second cousin was the grandfather of fellow Italian international goalkeeper Gianluigi Buffon. Lorenzo is also remembered for his marriage to Italian actress and television personality Edy Campagnoli, who had previously been in a relationship with his perceived career rival, Giorgio Ghezzi. Buffon died from a cardiac arrest on 25 November 2025, at the age of 95.

== Honours ==
AC Milan

- Serie A: 1950–51, 1954–55, 1956–57, 1958–59
- Latin Cup: 1951, 1956

Inter Milan

- Serie A: 1962–63

Individual

- FIFA XI: 1963
- AC Milan Hall of Fame
