= Karl-Heinz Spikofski =

German footballer (1927–1998)

Personal information
- Date of birth: 24 February 1927
- Place of birth: Essen, Germany
- Date of death: 18 June 1998 (aged 71)
- Position: Winger

Senior career*
Years	Team	Apps	(Gls)
- Rot-Weiss Essen
- 1. FC Köln
	Bayer Leverkusen	27	(3)
1952–?	Torino		
1952–1954	→ CO Roubaix-Tourcoing (loan)	45	(8)
1954–1957	Catania	76	(15)
1957–1959	VVV-Venlo	69	(17)
1959–1961	Wormatia Worms	56	(12)

Managerial career
- 1961–1963: FC Sion
- 1963–1964: BC Augsburg
- * Club domestic league appearances and goals

Karl-Heinz Spikofski (24 February 1927 – 18 June 1998) was a German football player and coach. A winger, he played for Rot-Weiss Essen, 1. FC Köln, Bayer Leverkusen, CO Roubaix-Tourcoing, Calcio Catania, VVV-Venlo and Wormatia Worms. After his playing career, he became a coach, first with FC Sion and then with BC Augsburg.
