= Luigi Moltrasio =

Italian footballer (1928–1990)

Personal information
- Full name: Luigi Moltrasio
- Date of birth: 17 January 1928
- Place of birth: Rovellasca, Italy
- Date of death: 28 March 1990 (aged 62)
- Place of death: Genoa, Italy
- Position: Midfielder

Senior career*
Years	Team	Apps	(Gls)
1949–1950	Crema	?	(?)
1950–1951	Como	3	(0)
1951–1952	Salernitana	31	(3)
1952–1956	Torino	112	(11)
1956–1959	Lazio	39	(3)
1959–1960	Young Fellows Zürich	?	(?)

International career
1954–1955	Italy	3	(0)
- * Club domestic league appearances and goals

Luigi Moltrasio (Italian pronunciation: [luˈiːdʒi molˈtraːzjo]; 17 January 1928 – 28 March 1990) was an Italian footballer who played as a midfielder. He represented the Italy national football team three times, the first being on 5 December 1954, the occasion of a friendly match against Argentina in a 2–0 home win.

== Honours ==
=== Player ===
Lazio

Coppa Italia: 1958
