= Juan Alberto Schiaffino =

Uruguayan footballer (1925-2002)

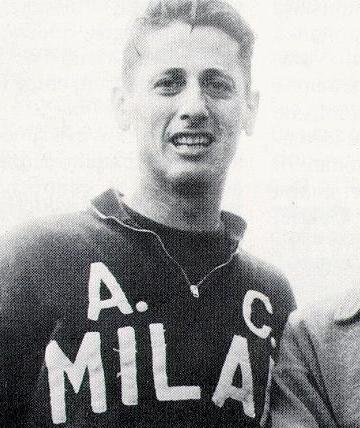
- Schiaffino with Milan in 1960

Personal information
- Full name: Juan Alberto Schiaffino Villalba
- Date of birth: 28 July 1925
- Place of birth: Montevideo, Uruguay
- Date of death: 13 November 2002 (aged 77)
- Place of death: Montevideo, Uruguay
- Height: 1.75 m (5 ft 9 in)
- Positions: Attacking midfielder; forward

Senior career*
Years	Team	Apps	(Gls)
1943–1954	Peñarol	227	(88)
1954–1960	AC Milan	149	(47)
1960–1962	Roma	39	(3)
Total		415	(138)

International career
1946–1954	Uruguay	21	(9)
1954–1958	Italy	4	(0)

Managerial career
- 1974–1975: Uruguay
- 1975–1976: Peñarol
Medal record
Representing Uruguay
FIFA World Cup
Winner	1950 Brazil
- * Club domestic league appearances and goals

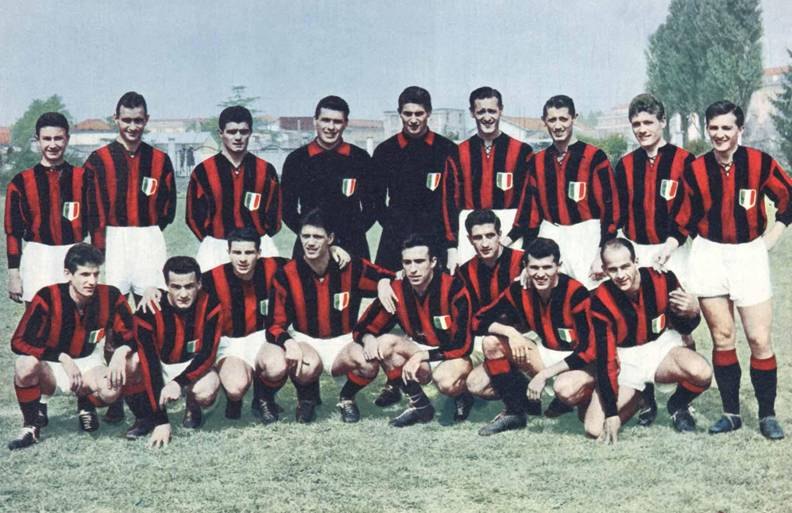
The A.C. Milan squad for the 1957–58 season. From left to right, standing: Reina, Galli, Fontana, Soldan, Lorenzo Buffon, Nils Liedholm, Juan Alberto Schiaffino, Radice, Bean; crouched: Beraldo, Grillo, Mariani, Cesare Maldini, Bergamaschi, Zannier, Francesco Zagatti, Cucchiaroni.

Juan Alberto "Pepe" Schiaffino Villalba (Italian pronunciation: [skjafˈfiːno]; 28 July 1925 – 13 November 2002) was a Uruguayan football player who played as an attacking midfielder or forward. A highly skilful and creative playmaker, at club level, he played for Peñarol in Uruguay, and for AC Milan, and Roma in Italy. At international level, he won the 1950 FIFA World Cup with the Uruguay national team, and also took part at the 1954 FIFA World Cup; he later also represented the Italy national football team.

He was ranked as the best Uruguayan footballer of all time by an IFFHS poll, and the 17th greatest player of the twentieth century.

== Club career ==
Following his eight successful years in Peñarol in his native Uruguayan league, Schiaffino was purchased by Italian Serie A club AC Milan, for an at the time world record fee of 52 million Lire, in September 1954. He played 171 games with AC Milan and scored 60 goals, and participated in the 1958 European Cup final, which Milan lost to Real Madrid 2–3 (aet). He was among the crucial offensive players in a Milan team that was dominated by foreign stars such as Nils Liedholm and Gunnar Nordahl. Schiaffino won three national championships with Milan, the victories being in 1955, 1957 and 1959, and one Latin Cup in 1956. Schiaffino left in 1960 to join Roma, where he played out his career during two moderately successful seasons, in which Roma finished fifth in the standings.

== International career ==
Schiaffino played for two national teams; first with the Uruguayan national team from 1946 to 1954, and later with the Italy national team from 1954 to 1958, courtesy of his paternal grandfather who was a Ligurian from the province of Genoa.

He earned 21 caps with the Uruguayan national team, scoring nine goals, and four caps with the Italy national team.

Schiaffino participated actively in Uruguay's victory in the 1950 World Cup, scoring one goal in the final and beating Brazil in its own stadium, in what was called the Maracanazo. He also played in the 1954 World Cup, helping his nation to a fourth-place finish in the tournament.

== Style of play ==
A tactically versatile player, with a slender physique, Schiaffino was usually deployed as a left-sided inside forward or second striker in the early part of his career, in particular with Peñarol and A.C. Milan, or as an attacking midfielder, although he was also capable of playing as a deep-lying playmaker in midfield, a role which he occupied more frequently as his career progressed. Schiaffino was renowned for his creative ability and for having a unique capacity to read the game, organise his teammates, orchestrate goalscoring opportunities, and dictate the tempo of his team's play in midfield, which made him a highly proficient playmaker and assist provider; as a footballer, he was best known for his excellent technical ability, passing range, intelligence, positional sense, leadership and vision. A well-rounded and hard-working player, who is regarded by pundits as one of the greatest footballers of all time, in addition to his skill, elegance and creativity on the ball, Schiaffino was also known for his defensive contribution and willingness to track back, put pressure on opponents and challenge them for the ball, often with sliding tackles; his wide range of skills also enabled him to play as a sweeper with Roma in his later career.

== Death ==
Schiaffino died on 13 November 2002. His remains are buried at the Cementerio del Buceo, Montevideo.

== Honours ==
=== Club ===
Peñarol

- Uruguayan First Division : 1949, 1951, 1953.
- Uruguayan Competition Tournament: 1946, 1947, 1949, 1951, 1953.
- Uruguayan Honor Tournament: 1947, 1949, 1950, 1951, 1952, 1953.
- Uruguayan South American Youth Champions Tournament: 1954.

Milan

- Serie A: 1954–55, 1956–57, 1958–59
- Latin Cup: 1956
- European Cup runner-up: 1957–58

Roma

- Inter-Cities Fairs Cup: 1961

=== International ===
Uruguay

- FIFA World Cup: 1950

=== Individual ===
- FIFA World Cup All-Star Team: 1950
- IFFHS Uruguayan Player of the 20th Century
- IFFHS South American Player of the 20th Century (6th place)
- IFFHS Player of the 20th Century (17th place)
- Guerin Sportivo Player of the Century (8th place)
- World Soccer: The 100 Greatest Footballers of All Time (68th place)
- A.C. Milan Hall of Fame
- IFFHS Legends
- FIFA World Cup Silver Ball (2nd Best Player): 1950
- Latin Cup Top Goalscorer: 1956
- UEFA Jubilee Poll (2004): #82
- IFFHS Uruguayan Men's Dream Team

== See also ==
- List of FIFA World Cup top goalscorers
