= Alessandro Vitali =

Italian painter

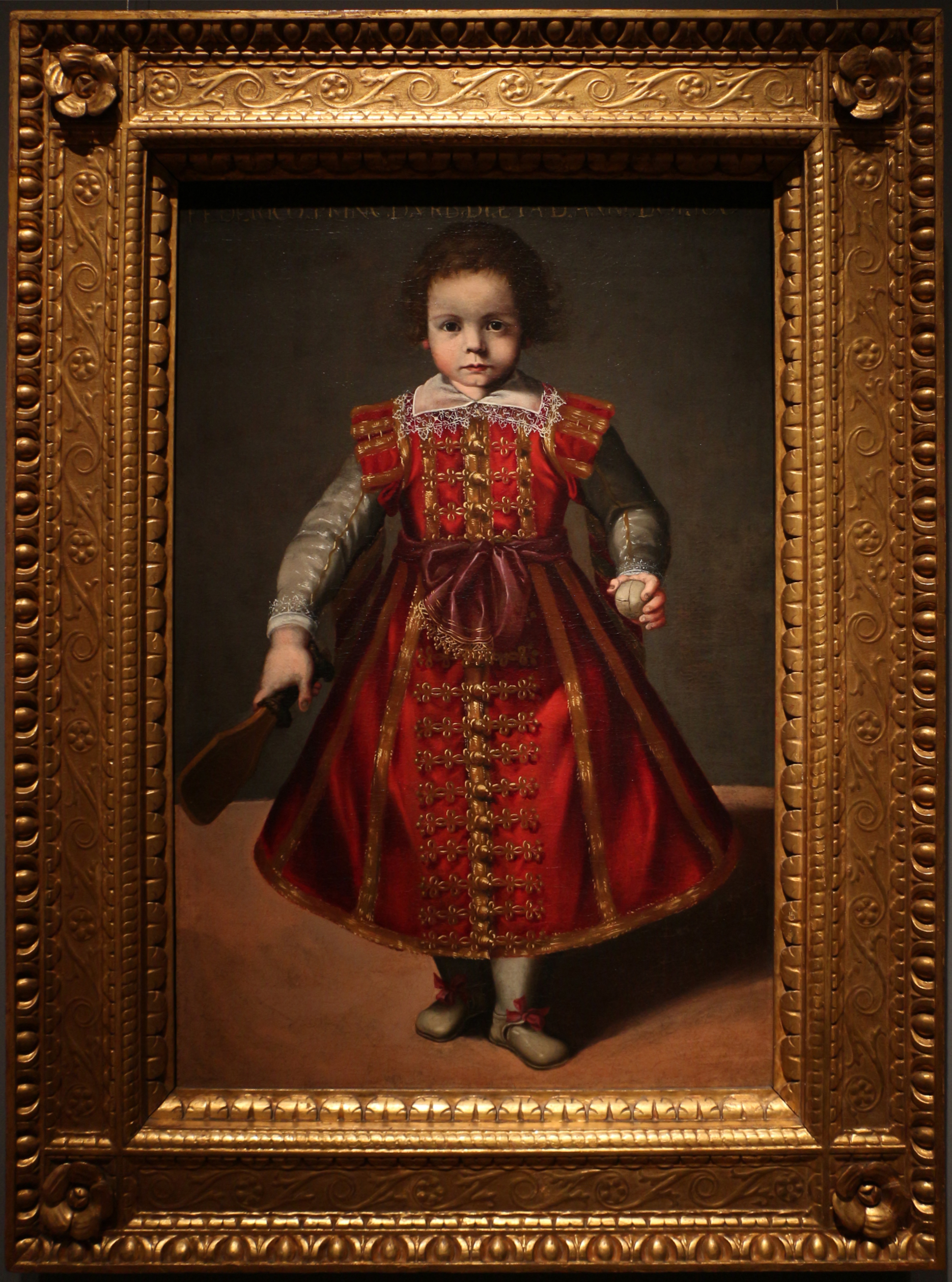
Federico, Prince of Urbino, at the Age of Two Years by Alessandro Vitali, 1607, Detroit Institute of Arts

Alessandro Vitali (1580–1650) was an Italian painter of the late-Renaissance and Baroque periods, born at Urbino. He was a follower of Federico Barocci.
