= Silvano Moro =

Italian footballer and manager

Personal information
- Full name: Silvano Moro
- Date of birth: 28 December 1927
- Place of birth: San Giorgio di Nogaro, Italy
- Date of death: 14 April 2008 (aged 80)
- Position: Defender

Senior career*
Years	Team	Apps	(Gls)
1948–1951	Pro Gorizia	60	(16)
1951–1953	Udinese	63	(9)
1953–1954	Milan	12	(0)
1954–1955	L.R. Vicenza Virtus	32	(1)
1955–1960	Padova	24	(0)
1960–1961	Treviso	26	(1)
1961–1962	Udinese	10	(0)
1962–1963	Chieti	26	(1)

International career
1958	Italy	1	(0)

Managerial career
- 1964–1965: Sangiorgina
- 1969: Atalanta
- 1969–1970: Cremonese
- 1980–1981: Palmanova
- * Club domestic league appearances and goals

Silvano Moro (Italian pronunciation: [silˈvaːno ˈmɔːro]; 28 December 1927 – 14 April 2008) was an Italian association football manager and footballer who played as a defender. On 23 March 1958, he played for the Italy national football team on the occasion of a friendly match against Austria in a 3–2 away loss.

== Honours ==
=== Player ===
Vicenza

- Serie B: 1954–55
