= Nils Liedholm =

Swedish footballer and manager (1922–2007)

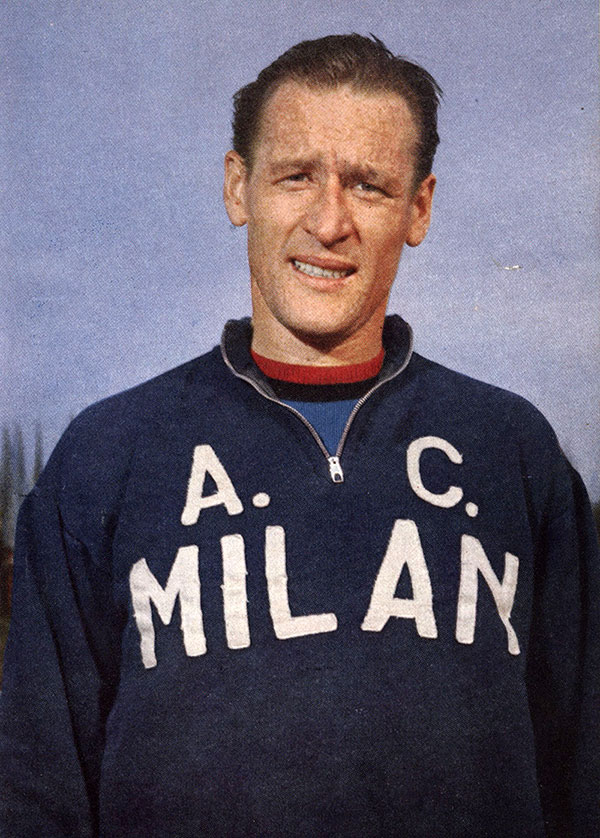
- Liedholm with AC Milan in 1959

Personal information
- Full name: Nils Erik Liedholm
- Date of birth: 8 October 1922
- Place of birth: Valdemarsvik, Sweden
- Date of death: 5 November 2007 (aged 85)
- Place of death: Cuccaro Monferrato, Italy
- Height: 1.85 m (6 ft 1 in)
- Position: Attacking midfielder

Youth career
- 1938–1942: Valdemarsvik

Senior career*
Years	Team	Apps	(Gls)
1942–1946	Sleipner	60	(24)
1946–1949	Norrköping	48	(22)
1949–1961	Milan	359	(81)
Total		467	(127)

International career
1947–1958	Sweden	23	(12)

Managerial career
- 1963–1966: AC Milan
- 1966–1968: Verona
- 1968–1969: Monza
- 1969–1971: Varese
- 1971–1973: Fiorentina
- 1973–1977: Roma
- 1977–1979: AC Milan
- 1979–1984: Roma
- 1984–1987: AC Milan
- 1987–1989: Roma
- 1992: Hellas Verona
- 1997: Roma
Medal record
Men's Football
Representing Sweden
Olympic Games
Gold medal – first place	1948 London
FIFA World Cup
Runner-up	1958 Sweden
- * Club domestic league appearances and goals

Nils Erik Liedholm (pronounced [ˈnɪlːs ˈlîːdhɔlm]; 8 October 1922 – 5 November 2007) was a Swedish professional football player and coach. Il Barone (the Baron), as he is affectionately known in Italy, was renowned for being part of the Swedish "Gre-No-Li" trio of strikers along with Gunnar Gren and Gunnar Nordahl at AC Milan and the Sweden national team, with which he achieved notable success throughout his career.

Liedholm was an intelligent and technically gifted offensive playmaker who was renowned for his range of passing and his elegant style of play; he is regarded as one of Milan's and Sweden's greatest ever players, and considered one of the best players of the post-war era. At the end of the 20th century, Liedholm was voted the best Swedish player of the millennium by the readers of Sweden's largest newspaper, Aftonbladet.

As a coach, he was in charge of several teams in Italy, managing for nearly four decades, and was known for using a zonal marking system; he is regarded as one of the most successful managers in Italian football history.

== Club career ==
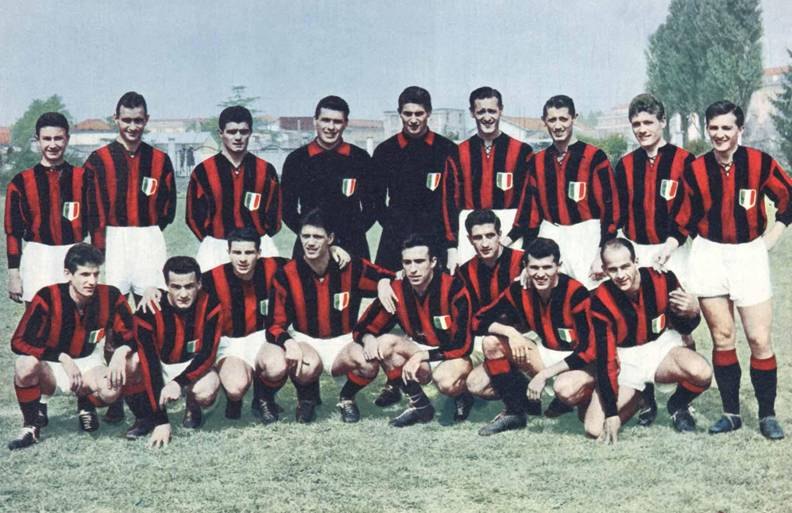
The AC Milan squad for the 1957–58 season; from left to right, standing: Reina, Galli, Fontana, Soldan, Lorenzo Buffon, Nils Liedholm, Juan Alberto Schiaffino, Radice, Bean; crouched: Beraldo, Grillo, Mariani, Cesare Maldini, Bergamaschi, Zannier, Francesco Zagatti, Cucchiaroni

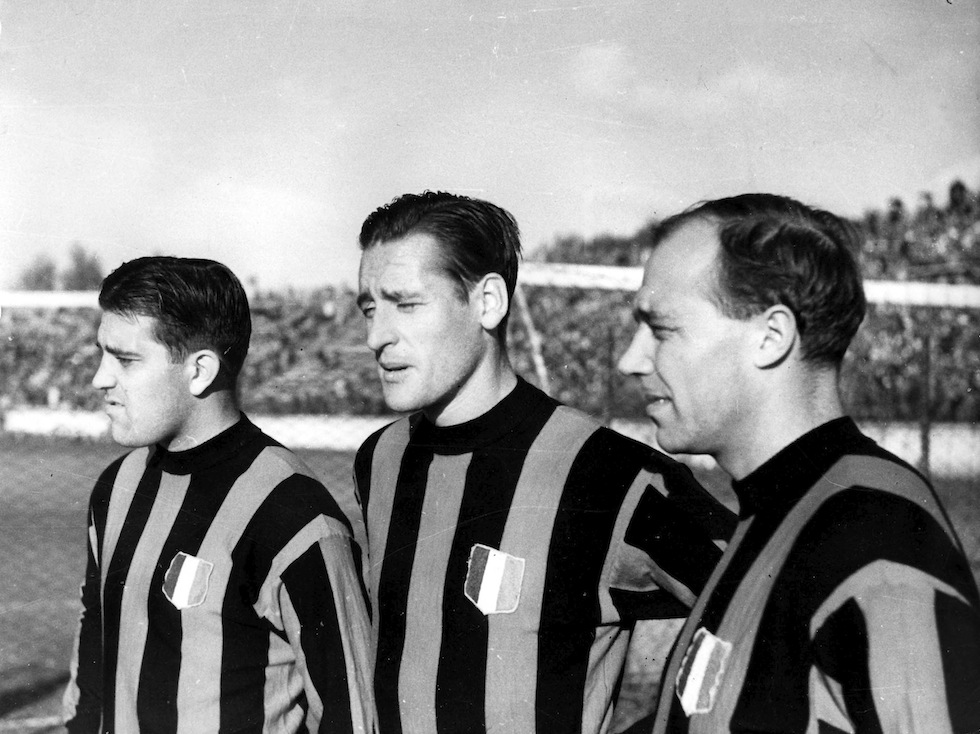
"Gre-No-Li" trio

Liedholm was born on 8 October 1922 in Valdemarsvik, to parents Erik Fredrik Elias Liedholm (1887–1950), a sawmill manager, and Anna Kajsa Lovisa Bergman (1900–1973). He joined his first club, Valdemarsvik, in 1938. In 1942, he joined Sleipner and in 1946 moved to Norrköping, a bigger Swedish club with whom he won two Swedish league titles. During his time with Norrköping, he also earned 18 caps for the Sweden national team, winning the gold medal at the 1948 Summer Olympics. This eventually gave him the chance to join AC Milan in 1949.

He made his Serie A debut on 11 September 1949 in a 3–1 win against Sampdoria. In his first season with Milan, the midfielder played 37 games and scored 18 goals. In 1951, Liedholm won the first of his four scudetto titles. Another three titles followed in 1955, 1957 and 1959. A player with a club that was having the best spell of its life up to that point, Liedholm also won the Latin Cup in 1951 and 1956 and was captain of AC Milan in the 1958 European Cup Final against Real Madrid, losing 3–2 (after extra time). It is said that Real Madrid great Alfredo Di Stefano who felt, despite victory, he knew it was a match Milan could have won. Asking Liedholm to exchange shirts, Liedholm said to him: "Keep it. That won't matter. The only thing that will be remembered from this match down the years is that Real Madrid won".

Famous for his passing abilities and tactical awareness, Liedholm was the creator of many of Gunnar Nordahl's goals. According to legend, it took two years playing for Milan until Liedholm misplaced his first pass at the San Siro, the rarity prompting a five-minute ovation from the home crowd.

Liedholm was also one of the first players to realise the importance of fitness to a good performance. Consequently, he put in many more hours of training than other players, saying himself that he did the 100 metres, 3000 metres, javelin, shot put and high jump twice a week. His club career would continue until he was almost 40.

== International career ==
Having helped Sweden win the gold medal in the 1948 Olympic tournament, Liedholm was the captain of the Sweden national team at the 1958 World Cup, celebrated in his home country. Aged almost 36, he helped Sweden to reach the World Cup final, where the team lost out to a Brazil side that included Didi and 17-year-old Pelé. Liedholm scored the opening goal of the final, which makes him the oldest player to score in a World Cup Final; however, Brazil came back and won the match 5–2.

== Style of play ==
Liedholm was an intelligent playmaker who was renowned for his elegant style of play, excellent range of passing, and precise crossing ability throughout his career, as well as his vision and tactical awareness, which enabled him to dictate play patiently or create chances for teammates with the instep, the inside, or the outside of his boot. He also possessed good technique, control, class, and an accurate shot, although he was known to be an unselfish team-player, who played with his head up and rarely undertook individual dribbles, and preferred to build attacks through movement and his slow passing game; moreover, he was an athletic footballer with a strong physique, who was known for his pace, fitness, and work-rate, which enabled him to cover a lot of ground and help out at both ends of the pitch. He also stood out for his leadership qualities throughout his career, despite his reserved character, as well as his correct behaviour, having never once been booked during his time in Italy.

A versatile player, he was primarily a midfielder and played in several different positions, including as an attacking midfielder, on the left as a wide midfielder, on the inside as an offensive-minded central midfielder, known as the mezzala role in Italian football jargon, in a holding midfield role as a deep-lying playmaker, as a forward, or even as a sweeper.

== Coaching career ==
After he retired from playing, Liedholm enjoyed some time in the backrooms at Milan, before getting promotion for both Verona and then Varese. This brought him to the attention of Fiorentina and then Milan, where he finally took control of the first team. He guided them to their tenth league title in 1979 before moving on to become the manager of Roma. Leading talents such as Paulo Roberto Falcão and Bruno Conti, he took them to their second league title ever in 1983 using the zonal marking system, which was unusual in Italy at the time. A year later, his Roma side lost on penalties to Liverpool in the European Cup Final. He also won the Coppa Italia three times with Roma, in 1980, 1981 and 1984.

As well as saying that the modern game is much more frantic and fast-paced than when he was involved, Liedholm, always a professional, also observed that "they [players] do not do much to avoid fouling players... It is too easy to stop a player by fouling him. Proper training teaches you how to win the ball without committing a foul, which is much more difficult."

== Style of management ==
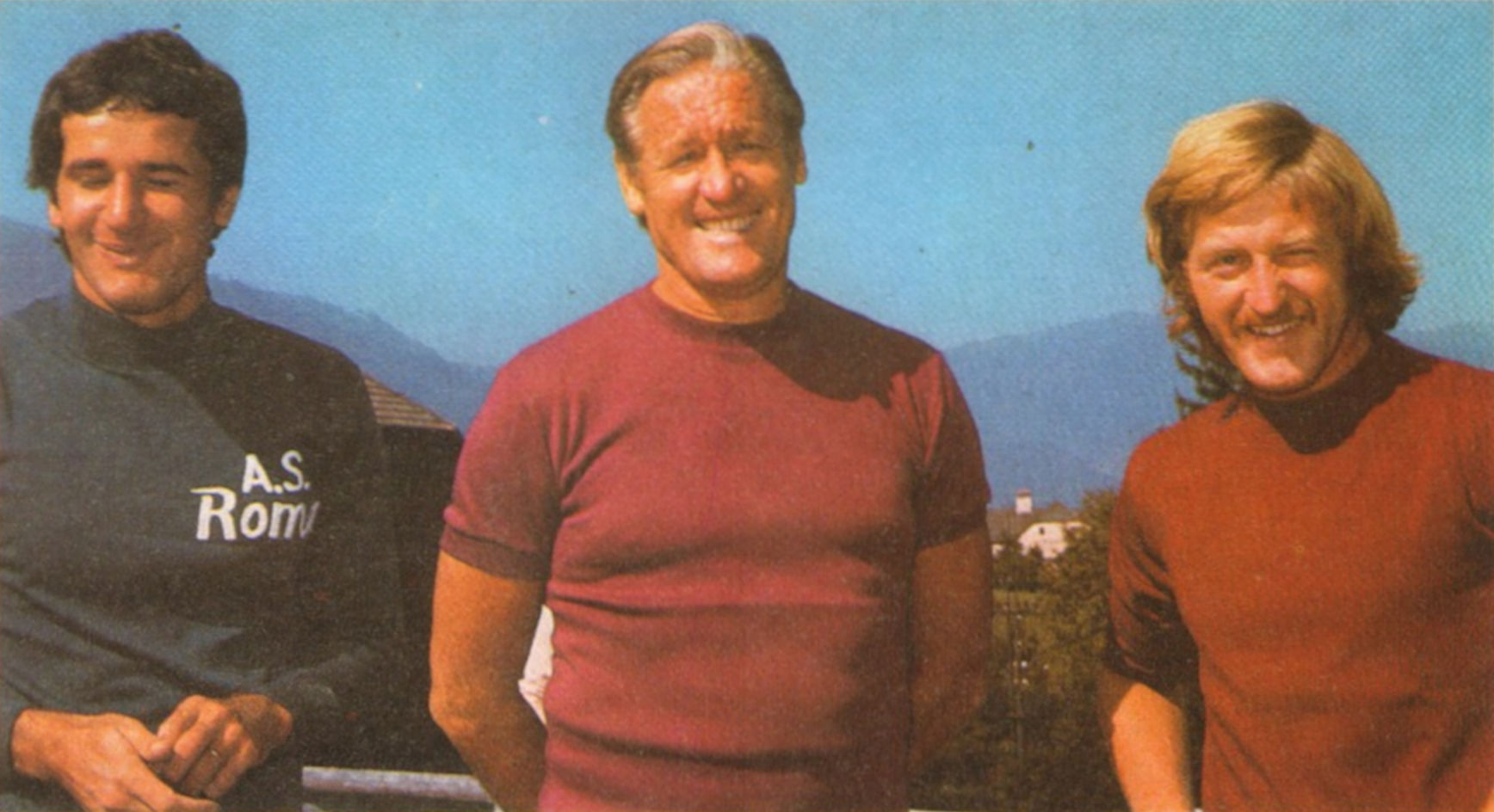
AS Roma coach Nils Liedholm poses in the 1975–76 preseason between the team's two new acquisitions, forward Carlo Petrini (left) and midfielder Loris Boni (right).

As a manager, Liedholm was known for implementing a defensive system based on zonal marking in Italy, and for his ability to instruct his players on his footballing philosophy based on patient ball possession and fluid positioning, which was inspired by Dutch Total Football; as such he was one of the first managers in Italy to move away from a more counter-attacking and man-marking playing style, and he encouraged his players to make use of the entire pitch. To disorient and break down his opponents' defensive shape, he made use of a series of horizontal passes, a tactic which became known as the "spider's web." He preferred teams made up of players with good technical skills, as his interpretation of the game was not based on prevention or breaking down the opposition, but on finding a system which best highlighted the individual skills of his players; he was also known for his ability to create a united team atmosphere among his players, as well as his adeptness at developing young talent. Moreover, he made use of innovative coaching techniques, which involved winning back the ball without resorting to committing fouls. During his time at Roma, he used a fluid formation which resembled a 1–3–3–3, which made use of an offensive sweeper who was expected to advance into midfield and to start attacking plays, and which did not use a genuine centre-forward. Former Parma manager Nevio Scala, who played under Liedholm, was inspired by Liedholm's calm approach as a coach.

== Other sports ==
He also was a bandy player in Valdemarsvik and the district team of Östergötland when he was young. In 2003, he was appointed honorary chairman of the Italian Bandy Federation.

== Later life and death ==
Liedholm was married to Maria Lucia "Nina" Gabotto di San Giovanni, a countess who could trace her ancestry back to the 900s. After leaving the game of football (but still living in Italy), he ran a vineyard together with his son Carlo (born 1958). Liedholm died on 5 November 2007 in his home in Cuccaro Monferrato, Province of Alessandria, aged 85.

== Career statistics ==
=== Club ===
Appearances and goals by club, season and competition
Club	Season	League			Cup		Europe (Note: Appearances in European Cup)		Other (Note: Appearances in Latin Cup & Amicizia Cup)		Total	
Club	Season	Division	Apps	Goals	Apps	Goals	Apps	Goals	Apps	Goals	Apps	Goals
AC Milan	1949–50	Serie A	37	18	-	-	-	-	-	-	37	18
AC Milan	1950–51	Serie A	31	13	-	-	-	-	2	0	33	13
AC Milan	1951–52	Serie A	38	9	-	-	-	-	-	-	38	9
AC Milan	1952–53	Serie A	30	6	-	-	-	-	2	1	32	7
AC Milan	1953–54	Serie A	31	10	-	-	-	-	-	-	31	10
AC Milan	1954–55	Serie A	28	6	-	-	-	-	1	1	29	7
AC Milan	1955–56	Serie A	31	1	-	-	6	0	2	0	39	1
AC Milan	1956–57	Serie A	26	4	-	-	-	-	2	1	28	5
AC Milan	1957–58	Serie A	24	7	-	-	8	2	-	-	32	9
AC Milan	1958–59	Serie A	30	1	2	1	-	-	-	-	32	2
AC Milan	1959–60	Serie A	28	3	-	-	4	0	3	2	35	5
AC Milan	1960–61	Serie A	25	3	1	-	-	-	2	-	28	3
Total			359	81	3	1	18	2	14	5	394	89

=== International ===
Appearances and goals by national team and year
National team	Year	Apps	Goals
Sweden	1947	7	5
Sweden	1948	9	4
Sweden	1949	2	1
Sweden	1950	0	0
Sweden	1951	0	0
Sweden	1952	0	0
Sweden	1953	0	0
Sweden	1954	0	0
Sweden	1955	0	0
Sweden	1956	0	0
Sweden	1957	0	0
Sweden	1958	5	2
Total		23	12

Scores and results list Sweden's goal tally first, score column indicates score after each Liedholm goal.

List of international goals scored by Nils Liedholm
No.	Date	Venue	Opponent	Score	Result	Competition	Ref.
1	15 June 1947	Parken, Copenhagen, Denmark	Denmark	3–0	4–1	1937–47 Nordic Football Championship	
2	24 August 1947	Ryavallen, Örebro, Sweden	Finland	1–0	7–0	1937–47 Nordic Football Championship	
3	24 August 1947	Ryavallen, Örebro, Sweden	Finland	6–0	7–0	1937–47 Nordic Football Championship	
4	14 September 1947	Råsunda Stadium, Solna, Sweden	Poland	5–2	5–4	Friendly	
5	5 October 1947	Råsunda Stadium, Solna, Sweden	Norway	2–0	4–1	1937–47 Nordic Football Championship	
6	11 July 1948	Råsunda Stadium, Solna, Sweden	Austria	1–1	3–2	Friendly	
7	5 August 1948	Selhurst Park, London, England	South Korea	1–0	12–0	1948 Summer Olympics	
8	5 August 1948	Selhurst Park, London, England	South Korea	6–0	12–0	1948 Summer Olympics	
9	10 October 1948	Råsunda Stadium, Solna, Sweden	Denmark	1–0	1–0	1948–51 Nordic Football Championship	
10	2 June 1949	Råsunda Stadium, Solna, Sweden	Republic of Ireland	3–1	3–1	1950 FIFA World Cup qualifier	
11	8 June 1958	Råsunda Stadium, Solna, Sweden	Mexico	2–0	3–0	1958 FIFA World Cup	
12	29 June 1958	Råsunda Stadium, Solna, Sweden	Brazil	1–0	2–5	1958 FIFA World Cup	

== Honours ==
=== Player ===
Norrköping

- Allsvenskan: 1946–47, 1947–48

AC Milan

- Serie A: 1950–51, 1954–55, 1956–57, 1958–59
- Latin Cup: 1951, 1956
- European Cup runner-up: 1957–58

Sweden

- Summer Olympic gold medalist: 1948
- FIFA World Cup runner-up: 1958

Individual

- Serie A Team of The Year: 1955, 1956, 1959
- Venerdì's 100 Magnifici
- UEFA Jubilee Poll (2004): No. 69

=== Manager ===
Varese

- Serie B: 1969–70

AC Milan

- Serie A: 1978–79

Roma

- Serie A: 1982–83
- Coppa Italia: 1979–80, 1980–81, 1983–84
- European Cup runner-up: 1983–84

Individual

- Seminatore d'Oro: 1974–75, 1983
- AC Milan Hall of Fame
- Italian Football Hall of Fame: 2016
