= Andrea Rizzoli =

Italian editor and publisher (1914–1983)

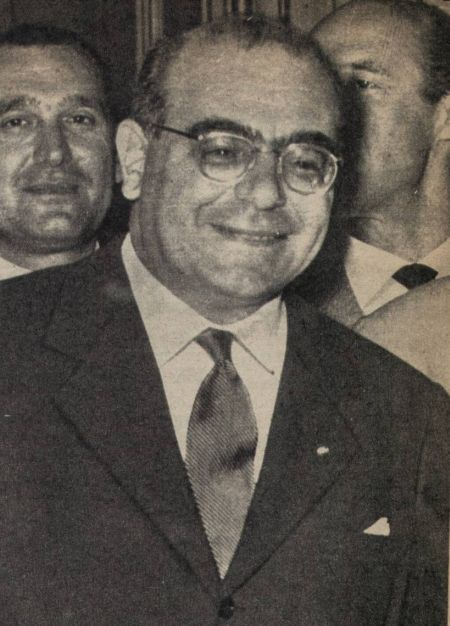
Andrea Rizzoli

Andrea Rizzoli (Milan, September 16, 1914 - Nice, May 31, 1983) was an Italian entrepreneur, publisher and film producer. He was the son of Angelo Rizzoli, president of the publishing house RCS MediaGroup, the first Italian publishing group in the seventies.

He was the father of Angelo Rizzoli.

== Biography ==
In 1974, Andrea bought for 50 billion Liras, a huge sum at the time, The Group Editoriale Corriere della Sera. Thereby, he acquired a 100% stake in the paper owned until then by the Crespi family, Angelo Moratti and Giovanni Agnelli.

Between 1954 and 1963, Rizzoli was the owner and President of A.C. Milan. During his presidency, Milanello sports center was built and the club won 4 Italian Leagues, 1 Latin cup and 1 European Champions Cup.
