= Valentino Valli =

Italian footballer (1929–2022)

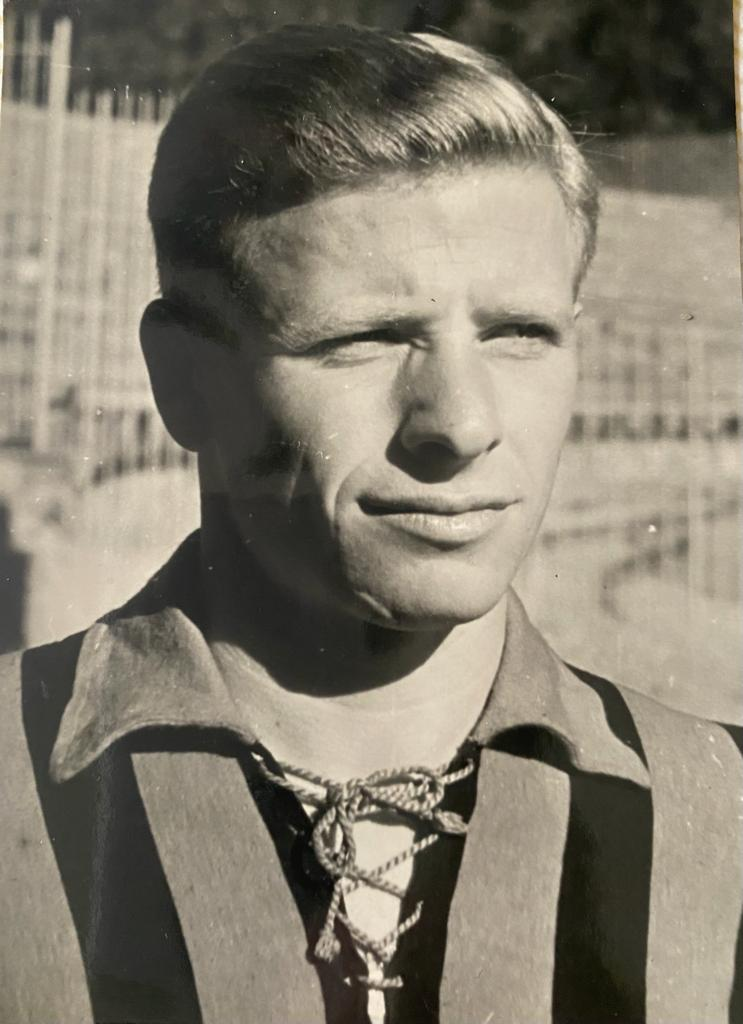
- Valli in the 1950s

Personal information
- Date of birth: 1 December 1929
- Place of birth: Ravenna, Italy
- Date of death: 16 February 2022 (aged 92)
- Place of death: Ravenna, Italy
- Position: Winger

Senior career*
Years	Team	Apps	(Gls)
- Edera Ravenna
- S.P.A.L.
- Como
- Legnano
- → Chinotto Neri (loan)
- Piombino
- Milan
- → Atalanta (loan)
- FEDIT
- Tevere Roma
- * Club domestic league appearances and goals

Valentino Valli (1 December 1929 – 16 February 2022) was an Italian professional footballer who played as a winger for Edera Ravenna, S.P.A.L., Como, Legnano, Chinotto Neri, Piombino, Milan, Atalanta, FEDIT and Tevere Roma. He died on 16 February 2022, at the age of 92.
