= Angelo Longoni =

Italian footballer (born 1933-1983)

Personal information
- Full name: Angelo Longoni
- Date of birth: 17 January 1933
- Place of birth: Lecco, Kingdom of Italy
- Date of death: 17 June 1983 (aged 50)
- Height: 1.67 m (5 ft 5 1/2 in)
- Position: Midfielder

Senior career*
Years	Team	Apps	(Gls)
1949–1950	Lecco		
1950–1954	A.C. Milan	15	(2)
1954–1961	Atalanta	196	(37)
1961–1963	Lazio	34	(11)
1963–1964	Vis Pesaro	34	(5)
1964–1966	Lecco		

International career
1956	Italy	1	(2)
- * Club domestic league appearances and goals

Angelo Longoni (Italian pronunciation: [ˈandʒelo loŋˈɡoːni]; 17 January 1933 – 17 June 1983) was an Italian footballer who played as a midfielder.

INFO

Ciccio Longoni played mostly as a left winger, but sometimes also operated on the right side. Longoni was a small and stocky player, very fast and astute, but technically not on a high level. Often irresistible with good pace and sudden wriggles, he was very dangerous. Ciccio had a strong shot, even two-footed, and also knew how to send a good cross from the wing. Longoni grew up in the Lecco footballing team in their city, was bought by AC Milan at just 17 years, a company in which, however, he had no way to shine. Its explosion occurred with the transfer of Atalanta, which competed with the signing of almost 200 games, 38 goals, managing to earn a call-up, increases in boys and made his debut for Milan in Serie A at 19 years, but was too minute to play with the famous Gre-No-Li and was sent to the province. So it was that in 20 years, Atalanta stayed there for 7 years before moving to Lazio. He played a game for the national team alongside Boniperti, Muccinelli and Montuori. The game in question was that of 9 December 1956 against Austria, in which he scored two goals in the victory (2-1), although this exploit was never called up to the senior national team. The game in question was that of 9 December 1956 against Austria, in which he scored two goals in the victory, but this exploit was never called up to the senior national team. After seven seasons with the jacket of neroazzurri was sold to Lazio, afterwards moved to Vis Pesaro in the first series, then C, concluding his career in Serie B in the ranks of Lecco. He was later a coach in Series C and Series D, training among others on Lecco, Croton, Giulianova and Marsala. Angelo Longoni died in 1993.

== Club career ==
Longoni played for several clubs, including Lecco, A.C. Milan, Atalanta, Lazio and Vis Pesaro.

== International career ==
Longoni played his one and only game for Italy in 1956, scoring two goals.
