= Franco Pedroni =

Italian footballer and manager

Personal information
- Full name: Franco Pedroni
- Date of birth: 13 September 1926
- Place of birth: Somma Lombardo, Italy
- Date of death: 12 February 2001 (aged 74)
- Place of death: Gallarate, Italy
- Positions: Midfielder; defender

Youth career
- 1942–1943: Gallaratese
- 1943–1946: Sommese

Senior career*
Years	Team	Apps	(Gls)
1946–1948	Gallaratese	52	(0)
1948–1952	Como	144	(1)
1952–1956	Milan	65	(1)
1956–1960	Alessandria	109	(0)
1960–1961	Pro Vercelli	4	(0)

Managerial career
- 1962–1963: Pro Patria
- 1963–1964: Mestrina
- 1965–1968: Casale
- 1968–1969: Verbania
- * Club domestic league appearances and goals as of March 2, 2010

Franco Pedroni (13 September 1926 – 12 February 2001) was an Italian professional footballer and manager who played as a midfielder or as a defender.

== Playing career ==
As a footballer, Pedroni made his debut in Serie A while playing with Como during the 1949–50 season. Later, he signed for Milan, winning 1954–55 championship, and also played for Alessandria.

== Coaching career ==
Pedroni's first experiences as a coach were with Alessandria, where he managed the team together with Luciano Robotti. He was young Gianni Rivera's mentor.

He later managed some teams in lower divisions.
