= Albano Vicariotto =

Italian footballer (1931–2019)

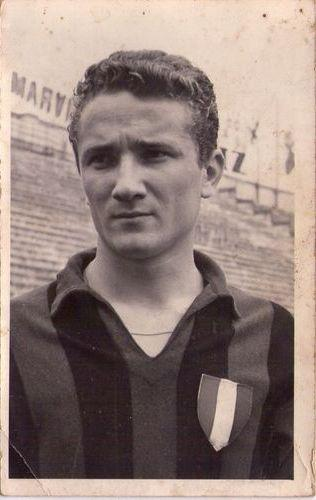

Personal information
- Date of birth: 25 January 1931
- Place of birth: Vicenza, Italy
- Date of death: 25 December 2019 (aged 88)
- Place of death: Vicenza, Italy
- Position: Midfielder

Youth career
- Vicenza

Senior career*
Years	Team	Apps	(Gls)
1948–1950	Vicenza	43	(6)
1950–1951	AC Milan	2	(0)
1951–1952	Torino	11	(2)
1952–1953	Padova	10	(0)
1953–1955	AC Milan	27	(8)
1955–1956	Pro Patria	21	(3)
1956–1958	Palermo	18	(2)
1958–1959	Pisa		
1959–1960	Arzignano		
- * Club domestic league appearances and goals

Albano Vicariotto (25 January 1931 – 25 December 2019) was an Italian footballer who played as a midfielder.

== Career ==
Born in Vicenza, Vicariotto made his debut for his hometown team Vicenza at the age of 17. After 6 goals in 43 appearances for the club in two years he transferred to AC Milan, where he made a further two appearances. He then spent time with Torino and Padova before returning to AC Milan in 1953, where he scored 8 goals in 28 appearances over the next two years. He later played for Pro Patria, Palermo and Pisa.
