= Mario Bergamaschi =

Italian footballer (1929–2020)

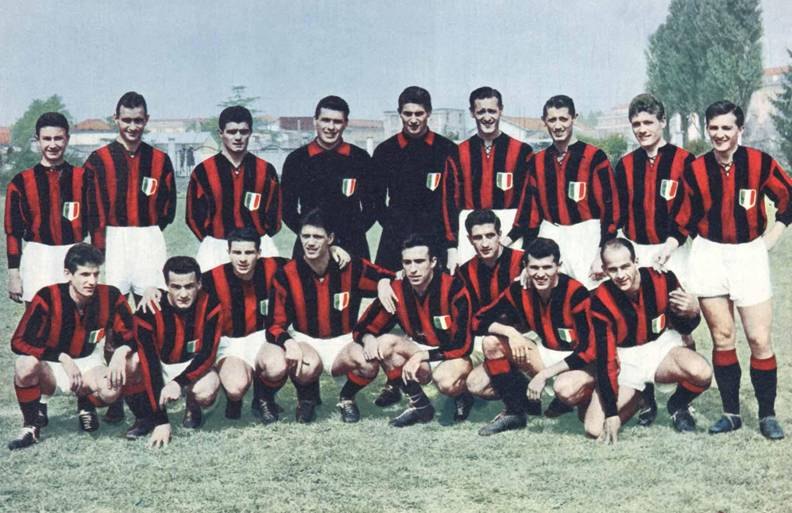
- Mario Bergamaschi (crouched, fourth from right) with the AC Milan squad for the 1957–58 season

Personal information
- Date of birth: 7 January 1929
- Place of birth: Crema, Italy
- Date of death: 18 January 2020 (aged 91)
- Place of death: Crema, Italy
- Height: 1.78 m (5 ft 10 in)
- Position: Midfielder

Senior career*
Years	Team	Apps	(Gls)
1947–1950	Crema		
1950–1953	Como	96	(2)
1953–1958	Milan	132	(3)
1958–1964	Sampdoria	164	(2)

International career
1954–1958	Italy	5	(0)
- * Club domestic league appearances and goals

Mario Bergamaschi (Italian pronunciation: [ˈmaːrjo berɡaˈmaski]; 7 January 1929 – 18 January 2020) was an Italian footballer who played as a midfielder.

At club level, he played for 14 seasons (392 games, 7 goals) in Serie A for Calcio Como, A.C. Milan and U.C. Sampdoria.

At international level, he made his debut for the Italy national football team on 5 December 1954 in a game against Argentina.

He stated that during the championship 1957 season he used to take doping that the players called "centimeter", from the markings on the syringe.

At the time of his death, he was the last living person to have appeared for Milan in the 1958 European Cup Final, as well as one of two living people born in the 1920s to have played for Milan, with the other being Lorenzo Buffon.

== Honours ==
Milan

- Serie A champion: 1954–55, 1956–57.
- Latin Cup winner: 1956.
