= Alfio Fontana =

Italian footballer (1932–2005)

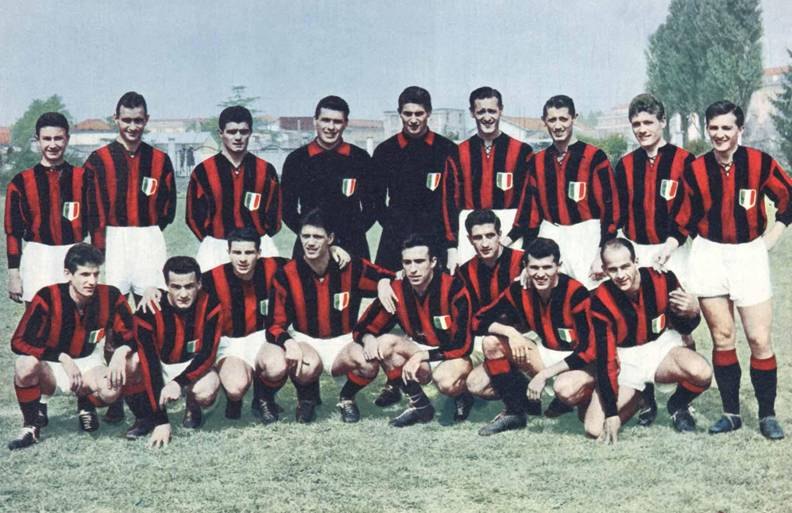
- Alfio Fontana (standing, third from left) with the AC Milan squad for the 1957–58 season

Personal information
- Date of birth: 7 November 1932
- Place of birth: Tradate, Kingdom of Italy
- Date of death: 4 February 2005 (aged 72)
- Place of death: Milan, Italy
- Height: 1.72 m (5 ft 7 1/2 in)
- Position: Midfielder

Senior career*
Years	Team	Apps	(Gls)
1952–1955	Milan	15	(0)
1955–1956	Triestina	22	(0)
1956–1960	Milan	132	(6)
1960–1964	Roma	127	(2)
1964–1965	Sampdoria	19	(0)
1965–1968	Casale	65	(11)

International career
1957–1960	Italy	3	(0)
- * Club domestic league appearances and goals

Alfio Fontana (Italian pronunciation: [ˈalfjo fonˈtaːna]; 7 November 1932 – 4 February 2005) was an Italian professional footballer who played as a midfielder.

== Club career ==
Fontana played for 13 seasons (318 games, 8 goals) in the Italian Serie A for A.C. Milan, U.S. Triestina Calcio, A.S. Roma and U.C. Sampdoria.

== International career ==
Fontana made 3 appearances for the Italy national football team between 1957 and 1960.

== Honours ==
Milan

- Serie A: 1954–55, 1956–57, 1958–59

Roma

- Inter-Cities Fairs Cup: 1960–61
