= Eros Beraldo =

Italian footballer (1929–2004)

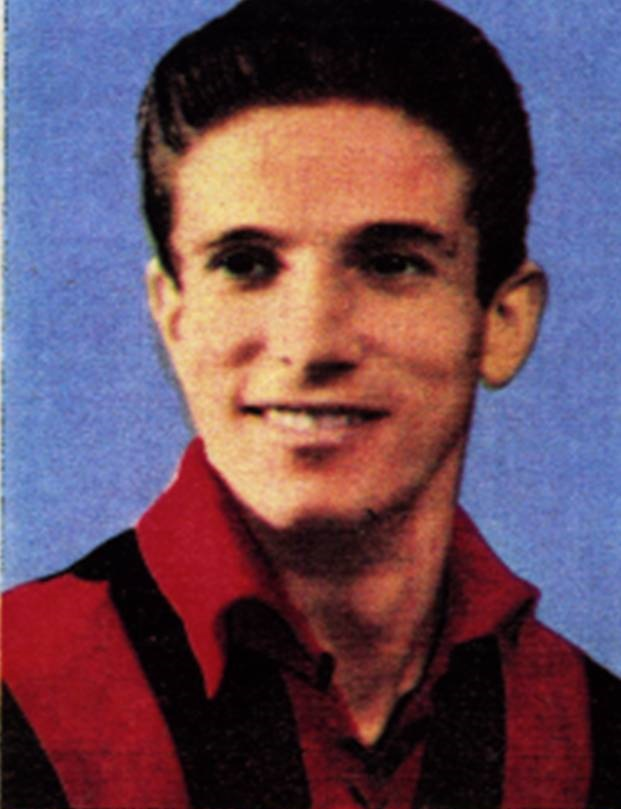
- Beraldo with A.C. Milan

Personal information
- Date of birth: 27 July 1929
- Place of birth: Verona, Italy
- Date of death: 27 December 2004 (aged 75)
- Place of death: Verona, Italy
- Position: Midfielder

Youth career
- San Zeno

Senior career*
Years	Team	Apps	(Gls)
1948–1952	Padova	43	(5)
1952–1959	A.C. Milan	108	(3)
1959–1961	Genoa	50	(0)
1961–1963	Cesena	44	(1)
Total		245	(9)

Managerial career
- 1971–1975: Belluno
- 1975–1976: Padova
- 1976–1977: Clodiasottomarina
- 1977–1978: Audace San Michele Extra
- * Club domestic league appearances and goals

Eros Beraldo (27 July 1929 – 27 December 2004) was an Italian football player and manager, who played as a midfielder.

== Honours ==
A.C. Milan

- Serie A: 1954–55, 1956–57, 1958–59
- Latin Cup: 1956
