= Francesco Zagatti =

Italian footballer (1932–2009)

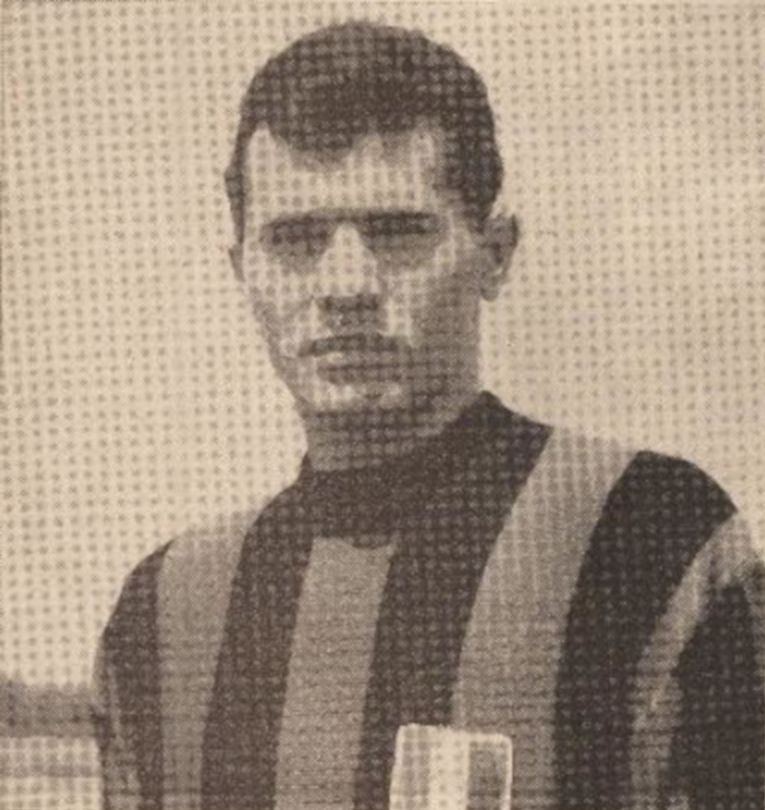
- Zagatti with A.C. Milan in 1959

Personal information
- Full name: Francesco Zagatti
- Date of birth: 18 April 1932
- Place of birth: Venaria Reale, Italy
- Date of death: 7 March 2009 (aged 76)
- Place of death: Milan, Italy
- Position: Right back

Youth career
- 1948–1952: Milan

Senior career*
Years	Team	Apps	(Gls)
1951–1963	Milan	214	(1)

Managerial career
- 1982: Milan
- 1965–1970: Milan Primavera
- * Club domestic league appearances and goals

Francesco Zagatti (18 April 1932 – 7 March 2009) was an Italian professional footballer who played as a defender. He usually played as an attacking full-back on either flank, and was known to be a generous, tenacious, and hard-working player, with an ability to make runs down the flank and get on the end of his teammates' passes.

== Playing career ==
Zagatti started his career at A.C. Milan. He played in their youth team, before making his senior debut in a Serie A game against Lazio, on 1 June 1952. He went on to spend his whole career with the Rossoneri, later captaining the squad, and winning four Scudetti, one European Cup and one Latin Cup.

== After retirement ==
After his retirement, Zagatti stayed at Milan as the coach of the youth team and later as a scout. During the 1981–82 season, he also served as head coach for a couple of games.

== Death ==
Zagatti died on 7 March 2009, aged 76, due to a serious form of Hepatitis.

== Honours ==
A.C. Milan

- Serie A: 1954–55, 1956–57, 1958–59, 1961–62
- European Cup: 1962–63
- Latin Cup: 1956

Individual

- A.C. Milan Hall of Fame
