= Lajos Czeizler =

Hungarian footballer (1893–1969)

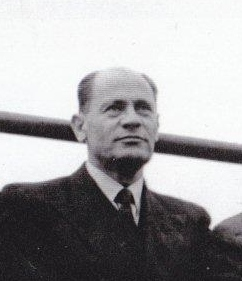

Personal information
- Full name: Lajos Czeizler
- Date of birth: 5 October 1893
- Place of birth: Heves, Austria-Hungary
- Date of death: 6 May 1969 (aged 75)
- Position: Goalkeeper

Senior career*
Years	Team	Apps	(Gls)
1921–1923	Vác	19	(0)

Managerial career
- 1923–1926: ŁKS
- 1927–1928: Udinese
- 1928–1930: Faenza
- 1930–1931: Lazio (youth)
- 1935–1936: ŁKS
- 1940: Västerås
- 1942–1948: IFK Norrköping
- 1949–1952: Milan
- 1953: Padova
- 1953–1954: Italy
- 1954–1957: Sampdoria
- 1958–1959: Fiorentina
- 1960–1961: Fiorentina
- 1963–1964: Benfica
- * Club domestic league appearances and goals

Lajos Czeizler (5 October 1893 – 6 May 1969) was a Hungarian footballer and coach. With 11 major titles altogether, he remains one of the most successful football coaches of all time.

== Career ==
Czeizler was born in a Jewish family in Heves, Austria-Hungary. He played as goalkeeper with Vác in the Hungarian championship between 1921 and 1923.

He started his coaching career in the 1920s in Poland, in Łódzki Klub Sportowy, where he had his first coaching experience between 1923 and 1926. After that, he spent his first years in Italy, coaching the second division sides of Udinese and CA Faenza and, from 1930 to 1931, the youth of S.S. Lazio.

From 1935 to 1936 he is coaching ŁKS again before moving to Sweden where his first engagement was in 1940 with Västerås SK. From 1942 to 1948, he had his greatest successes with IFK Norrköping, winning a record five championships between 1943 and 1948, as well as two national cups in 1943 and 1945. When he led Norrköping to the 1948 championship, he became the oldest coach in Sweden to achieve this title, aged 54 years, 8 months and 1 day. The record has since been lost to trainer Conny Karlsson with Helsingborgs IF.

After his time in Sweden, he returned to Italy where he led A.C. Milan in 1951 to championship honours and a win in the Latin Cup, an annual tournament of the best teams from France, Spain, Portugal and Italy – an important contest in the absence of any other European competition. He coached the Italy national team in the 1954 FIFA World Cup. In the 1960-61 season he coached Fiorentina until January 1961, and later, in June, the club won the Coppa Italia, defeating Lazio 2–0 in the final.

In the 1963–64 season he took S.L. Benfica to their fourth double of championship and cup of Portugal, and set a club record of 103 goals in 26 league matches.

== Honours ==
IFK Norrköping

- Allsvenskan: 1942–43, 1944–45, 1945–46, 1946–47, 1947–48
- Svenska Cupen: 1943, 1945

Milan

- Serie A: 1950-51
- Latin Cup: 1951

Benfica

- Primeira Liga: 1963–64
- Taça de Portugal: 1963–64
