= 1960–63 Nordic Football Championship =

Tournament details
- Host countries: Denmark; Finland; Norway; Sweden
- Dates: 26 May 1960 – 6 November 1963
- Teams: 4

Final positions
- Champions: Sweden (6th title)
- Runners-up: Denmark
- Third place: Norway
- Fourth place: Finland

Tournament statistics
- Matches played: 24
- Goals scored: 93 (3.88 per match)
- Top scorer: (Denmark) Ole Madsen (11 goals)

The 1960–63 Nordic Football Championship was the eighth tournament staged. Four Nordic countries participated: Denmark, Finland, Norway and Sweden. Sweden won the tournament, its sixth Nordic Championship win.

== Results ==
=== 1960 ===
26 May 1960
13:30 (UTC+1:00)

| Denmark | 3-0 | Norway |
|---|---|---|
| Pedersen 6'; Nielsen 16', 68' | Report |

Idrætsparken, Copenhagen
Attendance: 44,100
Referee: Reino Koskinen (Finland)
22 June 1960
19:00 (UTC+2:00)

| Finland | 0-3 | Sweden |
|---|---|---|
| | Report | Börjesson 14', 72'; Simonsson 86' |

Olympic Stadium, Helsinki
Attendance: 16,156
Referee: Kurt Tschenscher (West Germany)
10 August 1960
18:00 (UTC+1:00)

| Denmark | 2-1 | Finland |
|---|---|---|
| Nielsen 34', 57' | Report | Jensen 3' (o.g.) |

Idrætsparken, Copenhagen
Attendance: 37,500
Referee: Bengt Lundell (Sweden)
28 August 1960
13:15 (UTC+2:00)

| Norway | 6-3 | Finland |
|---|---|---|
| R. Pedersen 23', 50'; Jensen 36'; Hennum 70'; Berg 71', 80' | Report | Pahlman 20' (pen.); Kankkonen 61', 89' |

Ullevaal Stadion, Oslo
Attendance: 17,703
Referee: Valdemar Hansen (Denmark)
18 September 1960
13:15 (UTC+1:00)

| Norway | 3-1 | Sweden |
|---|---|---|
| Hennum 19' (pen.); R. Pedersen 34'; Borgen 89' | Report | Börjesson 38' (pen.) |

Ullevaal Stadion, Oslo
Attendance: 31,032
Referee: Carl Frederik Jørgensen (Denmark)
23 October 1960
14:00 (UTC+1:00)

| Sweden | 2-0 | Denmark |
|---|---|---|
| Börjesson 30'; Bild 83' | Report |

Ullevi, Gothenburg
Attendance: 50,878
Referee: Birger Nilsen (Norway)

=== 1961 ===
18 June 1961
13:30 (UTC+1:00)

| Denmark | 1-2 | Sweden |
|---|---|---|
| Madsen 61' | Report | Börjesson 7', 58' |

Idrætsparken, Copenhagen
Attendance: 52,486
Referee: Birger Nilsen (Norway)
27 June 1961
18:00 (UTC+2:00)

| Finland | 4-1 | Norway |
|---|---|---|
| Pahlman 19'; Mäkelä 32'; Holmqvist 43'; Nuoranen 58' | Report | R. Pedersen 44' |

Olympic Stadium, Helsinki
Attendance: 8,712
Referee: Einar Boström (Sweden)
9 August 1961
18:30 (UTC+1:00)

| Sweden | 4-0 | Finland |
|---|---|---|
| Svahn 10', 41'; Bild 83'; Backman 85' | Report |

Norrköpings Idrottspark, Norrköping
Attendance: 10,868
Referee: Jarl Hansen (Denmark)
17 September 1961
13:15 (UTC+1:00)

| Norway | 0-4 | Denmark |
|---|---|---|
| | Report | Danielsen 11', 32'; Madsen 70'; Sørensen 76' |

Ullevaal Stadion, Oslo
Attendance: 27,721
Referee: Johan Alho (Finland)
15 October 1961
13:30 (UTC+1:00)

| Denmark | 9-1 | Finland |
|---|---|---|
| Sørensen 7', 52', 85'; Danielsen 14', 24'; Madsen 46', 78'; Rasmussen 57', 71' | Report | Österlund 81' |

Idrætsparken, Copenhagen
Attendance: 35,600
Referee: Alfred Haberfellner (Austria)
22 October 1961
14:15 (UTC+1:00)

| Sweden | 2-0 | Norway |
|---|---|---|
| Råberg 6'; Wendt 74' | Report |

Ullevi, Gothenburg
Attendance: 41,387
Referee: Milan Fencl (Czechoslovakia)

=== 1962 ===
11 June 1962
18:00 (UTC+1:00)

| Denmark | 6-1 | Norway |
|---|---|---|
| Jørgensen 22'; Madsen 31', 44', 87'; Bertelsen 69'; Enoksen 71' (pen.) | Report | Andersen 24' |

Idrætsparken, Copenhagen
Attendance: 13,500
Referee: Erik Johansson (Sweden)
19 June 1962
19:00 (UTC+2:00)

| Finland | 0-3 | Sweden |
|---|---|---|
| | Report | Grahn 40'; Brodd 51'; Ohlsson 71' |

Olympic Stadium, Norway
Attendance: 17,555
Referee: Erling Rolf Olsen (Sweden)
26 August 1962
13:15 (UTC+2:00)

| Norway | 2-1 | Finland |
|---|---|---|
| Nilsen 42'; Larsen 48' (pen.) | Report | Mäkelä 17' |

Brann Stadion, Bergen
Attendance: 20,500
Referee: Erling Rolf Olsen (Sweden)
16 September 1962
13:30 (UTC+2:00)

| Finland | 1-6 | Denmark |
|---|---|---|
| Virtanen 13' | Report | Clausen 4'; Enoksen 14', 49'; Jørgensen 36'; Madsen 39', 69' |

Olympic Stadium, Helsinki
Attendance: 9,276
Referee: Sergey Alimov (Soviet Union)
16 September 1962
13:15 (UTC+1:00)

| Norway | 2-1 | Sweden |
|---|---|---|
| Jensen 43'; Johansen 80' | Report | Skiöld 40' |

Ullevaal Stadion, Oslo
Attendance: 21,689
Referee: Valdemar Hansen (Denmark)
28 October 1962
14:00 (UTC+1:00)

| Sweden | 4-2 | Denmark |
|---|---|---|
| Ohlsson 28', 34'; Martinsson 48'; Eriksson 51' | Report | Bertelsen 21'; Madsen 31' |

Råsunda Stadium, Stockholm
Attendance: 18,847
Referee: Antero Lartola (Finland)

=== 1963 ===
3 June 1963
13:30 (UTC+1:00)

| Denmark | 1-1 | Finland |
|---|---|---|
| Enoksen 86' | Report | Pahlman 62' |

Idrætsparken, Copenhagen
Attendance: 21,600
Referee: Birger Nilsen (Norway)
27 June 1963
19:00 (UTC+2:00)

| Finland | 2-0 | Norway |
|---|---|---|
| Pahlman 53' (pen.); Lyytikäinen 68' | Report |

Olympic Stadium, Helsinki
Attendance: 11,603
Referee: Bramming Sørensen (Denmark)
14 August 1963
19:00 (UTC+1:00)

| Sweden | 0-0 | Finland |
|---|---|---|
| | Report |

Råsunda Stadium, Stockholm
Attendance: 7,788
Referee: Hannes Sigurðsson (Iceland)
14 August 1963
18:30 (UTC+1:00)

| Sweden | 0-0 | Norway |
|---|---|---|
| | Report |

Ullevi, Gothenburg
Attendance: 32,030
Referee: Martti Hirviniemi (Finland)
15 September 1963
13:15 (UTC+1:00)

| Norway | 0-4 | Denmark |
|---|---|---|
| | Report | Thorst 39'; Bertelsen 74', 81'; Enoksen 85' (pen.) |

Ullevaal Stadion, Oslo
Attendance: 23,804
Referee: Einar Boström (Sweden)
6 November 1963
13:30 (UTC+1:00)

| Denmark | 2-2 | Sweden |
|---|---|---|
| Madsen 14'; Thorst 43' | Report | Bild 4'; Öberg 7' |

Idrætsparken, Copenhagen
Attendance: 52,000
Referee: Arthur Holland (England)

== Table ==
'Two points for a victory, one point for a draw, no points for a loss.

| | Team | Pld | W | D | L | GF | GA | GD | Pts |
|---|---|---|---|---|---|---|---|---|---|
| 1 | Sweden | 12 | 7 | 3 | 2 | 24 | 10 | +14 | 17 |
| 2 | Denmark | 12 | 7 | 2 | 3 | 40 | 15 | +25 | 16 |
| 3 | Norway | 12 | 4 | 1 | 7 | 15 | 31 | –16 | 9 |
| 4 | Finland | 12 | 2 | 2 | 8 | 14 | 37 | –23 | 6 |

== Winners ==
1960–63 Nordic Football Championship

Sweden
Sixth title

== Statistics ==
=== Goalscorers ===
There were 93 goals scored in 24 matches, for an average of 3.88 goals per match.

11 goals

- (Denmark) Ole Madsen

6 goals

- (Sweden) Rune Börjesson

5 goals

- (Denmark) Henning Enoksen

4 goals

- (Denmark) John Danielsen
- (Denmark) Carl Bertelsen
- (Finland) Kai Pahlman
- (Norway) Rolf Birger Pedersen

3 goals

- (Denmark) Jørn Sørensen
- (Sweden) Harry Bild
- (Sweden) Owe Ohlsson

2 goals

- (Denmark) Egon Rasmussen
- (Denmark) Helge Jørgensen
- (Denmark) Kjeld Thorst
- (Denmark) Harald Nielsen
- (Denmark) Flemming Nielsen
- (Finland) Matti Mäkelä
- (Finland) Hannu Kankkonen
- (Norway) Axel Berg
- (Norway) Harald Hennum
- (Norway) Roald Jensen
- (Sweden) Ingvar Svahn

1 goal

- (Denmark) Eyvind Clausen
- (Denmark) Poul Pedersen
- (Denmark) Ole Sørensen
- (Finland) Juha Lyytikäinen
- (Finland) Rauli Virtanen
- (Finland) Tor Österlund
- (Finland) Semi Nuoranen
- (Finland) Stig Holmqvist
- (Norway) Erik Johansen
- (Norway) Olav Nilsen
- (Norway) Bjørn Borgen
- (Norway) Trygve Andersen
- (Norway) Ragnar Larsen
- (Sweden) Agne Simonsson
- (Sweden) Prawitz Öberg
- (Sweden) Lars Råberg
- (Sweden) Leif Skiöld
- (Sweden) Leif Wendt
- (Sweden) Leif Eriksson
- (Sweden) Lennart Backman
- (Sweden) Örjan Martinsson
- (Sweden) Ove Grahn
- (Sweden) Yngve Brodd

1 own goal

- (Denmark) Poul Jensen (against Finland)

== See also ==
- Balkan Cup
- Baltic Cup
- Central European International Cup
- Mediterranean Cup
