= Axel Berg =

Axel Berg may refer to:

- Axel Berg (architect) (born 1856), Danish architect
- Axel Berg (politician) (born 1959), German politician
- Axel Berg (footballer) (1938–2020), Norwegian football winger

== See also ==
- Aksel Berg (1893–1979), Soviet scientist and engineer
