= Stig Ekman =

Swedish footballer (born 1944)

Personal information
- Full name: Stig Arnold Ekman
- Date of birth: 24 July 1944 (age 82)
- Place of birth: Degerfors, Sweden
- Position: Midfielder

Youth career
- Degerfors IF

Senior career*
Years	Team	Apps	(Gls)
1963–1969	Degerfors IF	77	(18)

International career
1963	Sweden U21	1	(0)
- * Club domestic league appearances and goals

Stig Arnold "Stisse" Ekman (24 July 1944) is a Swedish former footballer who played as a midfielder. He played for Degerfors IF in the 1960s and was part of the Degerfors team that finished second during the 1963 Allsvenskan season. He played once for the Sweden U21 team in the same year. He is currently part of Degerfors IF's coaching staff.

== Club career ==
Ekman came through the Degerfors IF youth academy and became a prominent player for the senior team in the 1960s, helping the team finished second in Allsvenskan in 1963. He played a total of five Allsvenskan seasons for the club.

== International career ==
Ekman represented the Sweden U21 team once on 14 August 1963, in a friendly 2–0 win against Finland.

== Post-playing career ==
Ekman has served as part of the Degerfors IF coaching staff since 1993.
