= Örjan Martinsson =

Swedish footballer (1936–1997)

Personal information
- Date of birth: 1 November 1936
- Place of birth: Vadstena, Sweden
- Date of death: 28 February 1997 (aged 60)
- Position: Forward

Senior career*
Years	Team	Apps	(Gls)
1959–1967	IFK Norrköping	173	(53)
Total		173	(53)

International career
1960–1966	Sweden	20	(5)

Managerial career
- 1972: IFK Norrköping
- * Club domestic league appearances and goals

Örjan Martinsson (1 November 1936 – 28 February 1997) was a Swedish footballer who played as a forward. He made 20 appearances for the Sweden national team from 1960 to 1966.

== Honours ==
IFK Norrköping

- Allsvenskan: 1960, 1962, 1963
