= Eldar Abdulic =

Swedish football coach

Personal information
- Full name: Eldar Abdulic
- Date of birth: 1 November 1987 (age 38)
- Place of birth: Banja Luka, Bosnia and Herzegovina

Team information
- Current team: IFK Norrköping

Youth career
- Sandvikens IF

Senior career*
Years	Team	Apps	(Gls)
- Brynäs IF
- Sandvikens AIK
- Sandvikens IF

Managerial career
- 2016–2021: Sandvikens AIK
- 2022–2025: Sandvikens IF
- 2026–: IFK Norrköping
- * Club domestic league appearances and goals

Eldar Abdulic (born 1 November 1987) is a Bosnian-born Swedish football manager. He is currently the head coach of Superettan club IFK Norrköping.

== Playing career ==
Abdulic played his youth football at Sandvikens IF and then continued his first team career with Brynäs IF, Sandvikens AIK before returning to the first team of his youth club Sandvikens IF.

== Coaching career ==
After ending his playing career Abdulic took over as manager for Sandvikens AIK in 2016. During his time at the club they achieved two promotions from the sixth to fourth tier of swedish football.

In 2022 Abdulic was recruited by Sandvikens IF for the role of assistant manager but ended up taking over as manager halfway through the year. At the end of the season he signed a three year deal to remain with the club. The following season he guided Sandvikens IF to promotion to Superettan which was the first time the club had played in the top two divisions of swedish football for 32 years. During the next two years they stabilized as a midtable team with Abdulic receiving the "manager of the month" award in June 2025.

IFK Norrköping had just been relegated from top tier Allsvenskan in 2025 when they announced that Abdulic would replace previous coach Martin Falk to lead the club during the upcoming 2026 Superettan season. The recruitment turned out to be a big success as Norrköping secured their promotion back to Allsvenskan with four games remaining.

== Personal life ==
Abdulic was born in Bosnia and Herzegovina but moved to Sandviken in Sweden with his family at the age of five. In 2023 he was nominated for the "citizen of the year" award in the town of Sandviken.
