= John Danielsen =

Danish footballer (born 1939)

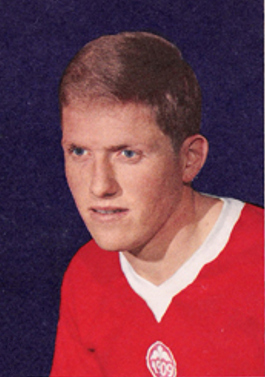
- Danielsen in the 1960s

Personal information
- Date of birth: 13 July 1939 (age 87)
- Place of birth: Odense, Denmark
- Height: 1.80 m (5 ft 11 in)
- Position: Midfielder

Senior career*
Years	Team	Apps	(Gls)
1957–1965	B 1909	157	(55)
1965–1970	Werder Bremen	131	(17)
1970–1973	Chiasso	69	(8)
1973	B 1909	5	(0)
Total		362	(80)

International career
1956	Denmark U19	2	(1)
1958–1960	Denmark U21	4	(1)
1958–1964	Denmark	27	(7)
Medal record
Representing Denmark
Men's Football
Silver medal – second place	1960 Rome	Team competition
- * Club domestic league appearances and goals

John Danielsen (born 13 July 1939) is a Danish former footballer who played as a midfielder. During his club career he played for Boldklubben 1909. He earned 27 caps for the Denmark national team, won a silver medal in football at the 1960 Summer Olympics, and was in the finals squad for the 1964 European Nations' Cup. He played for 1909 from Odense in Denmark. He was transferred to the German club Werder Bremen, later returning to play for B 1909 again at the end of his career in the early 1970s.

== Career statistics ==
=== International ===
Scores and results list Denmark's goal tally first, score column indicates score after each Danielsen goal.

List of international goals scored by John Danielsen
No.	Date	Venue	Opponent	Score	Result	Competition
1	14 September 1958	Helsinki Olympic Stadium, Helsinki, Finland	Finland	3–0	4–1	1956–59 Nordic Football Championship
2	14 September 1958	Helsinki Olympic Stadium, Helsinki, Finland	Finland	4–0	4–1	1956–59 Nordic Football Championship
3	17 September 1961	Ullevaal Stadion, Oslo, Norway	Norway	1–0	4–0	1960–63 Nordic Football Championship
4	17 September 1961	Ullevaal Stadion, Oslo, Norway	Norway	2–0	4–0	1960–63 Nordic Football Championship
5	15 October 1961	Københavns Idrætspark, Copenhagen, Denmark	Finland	2–0	9–1	1960–63 Nordic Football Championship
6	15 October 1961	Københavns Idrætspark, Copenhagen, Denmark	Finland	3–0	9–1	1960–63 Nordic Football Championship
7	28 June 1964	Malmö Stadion, Malmö, Sweden	Sweden	1–4	1–4	1964–67 Nordic Football Championship
