= Owe Ohlsson =

Swedish footballer and manager

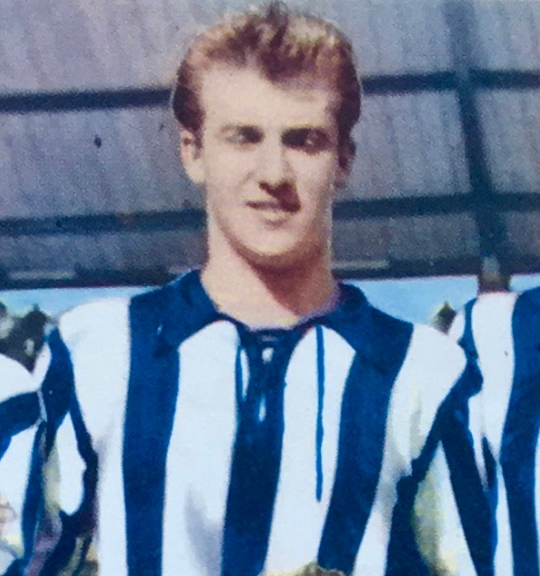
- Ohlsson in IFK Göteborg in 1958

Personal information
- Full name: Sven Owe Ohlsson
- Date of birth: 19 August 1938 (age 88)
- Place of birth: Hälsö, Sweden
- Position: Forward

Youth career
- 1948–1954: Hälsö BK

Senior career*
Years	Team	Apps	(Gls)
1954–1964	IFK Göteborg	165	(101)
1965–1971	AIK	154	(23)
1972–1974	IFK Stockholm		

International career
1958–1959	Sweden U21	9	(9)
1958–1965	Sweden B	5	(8)
1958–1964	Sweden	15	(6)

Managerial career
- 1972–1974: IFK Stockholm
- 1975–1976: AIK (youth)
Medal record
Men's Football
Representing Sweden
FIFA World Cup
Runner-up	1958 Sweden
- * Club domestic league appearances and goals

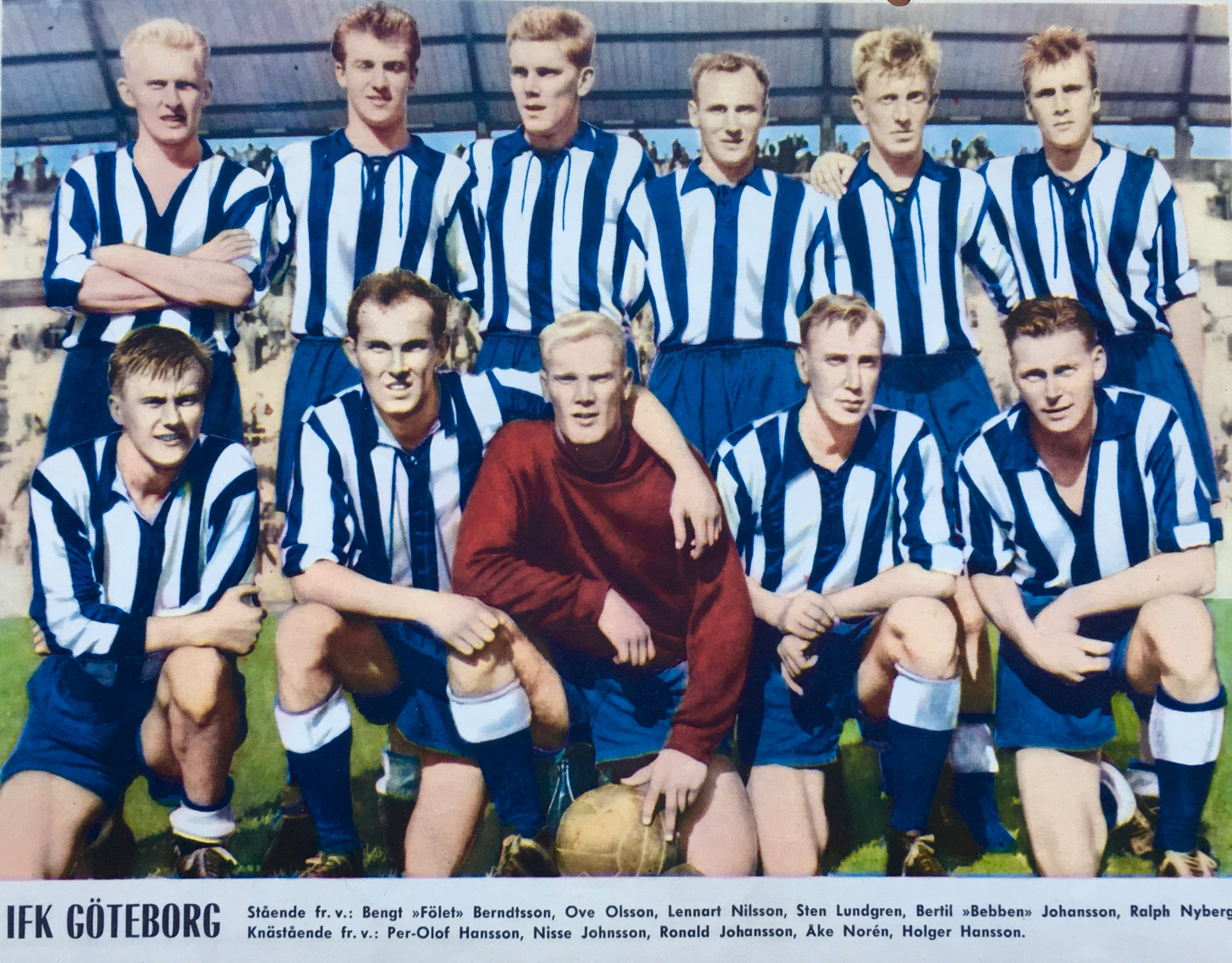
Ohlsson pictured second from the left in the back row for IFK Göteborg in 1958

Sven Owe Ohlsson (born 19 August 1938) is a Swedish former football player who played as a forward and later became a manager. He most notably represented IFK Göteborg and AIK at the club level. He is now the last surviving player from the Sweden team in the 1958 World Cup.

== Club career ==
Born in Hälsö, he played for local club Hälsö BK before moving to Swedish giants IFK Göteborg and AIK. He ended his career as player-coach of IFK Stockholm. He is the first player to score five goals in a European Cup match, in the 1959–60 European Cup, against Linfield. He won the 1957–58 Allsvenskan title while at IFK Göteborg.

== International career ==
He was part of the Swedish squad at the 1958 FIFA World Cup. He was capped 15 times, scoring 6 goals. He also represented the Sweden U21 and B teams.

== Career statistics ==
=== International ===
Appearances and goals by national team and year
National team	Year	Apps	Goals
Sweden	1958	1	0
Sweden	1959	1	1
Sweden	1960	1	0
Sweden	1961	0	0
Sweden	1962	8	5
Sweden	1963	3	0
Sweden	1964	1	0
Total		15	6

Scores and results list Sweden's goal tally first, score column indicates score after each Ohlsson goal.

List of international goals scored by Owe Ohlsson
No.	Date	Venue	Opponent	Score	Result	Competition	Ref.
1	21 May 1959	Ullevi, Gothenburg, Sweden	Portugal	2–0	2–0	Friendly	
2	19 June 1962	Helsinki Olympic Stadium, Helsinki, Finland	Finland	3–0	3–0	1960–63 Nordic Football Championship	
3	28 October 1962	Råsunda Stadium, Solna, Sweden	Denmark	1–1	4–2	1960–63 Nordic Football Championship	
4	28 October 1962	Råsunda Stadium, Solna, Sweden	Denmark	2–2	4–2	1960–63 Nordic Football Championship	
5	12 November 1962	Ramat Gan Stadium, Ramat Gan, Israel	Israel	1–0	4–0	Friendly	
6	16 November 1962	Bangkok, Thailand	Thailand	1–1	2–1	Friendly	

== Honours ==
IFK Göteborg

- Allsvenskan: 1957–58

Sweden

- FIFA World Cup runner-up: 1958
