= IFK Norrköping =

Swedish football club

Norrköping
- Full name: Idrottsföreningen Kamraterna Norrköping
- Nicknames: Peking (Beijing); Kamraterna (The Comrades); Snoka; Vita-Blå (White-Blue)
- Short name: IFK Norrköping; IFK; Norrköping
- Founded: 29 May 1897; 129 years ago
- Stadium: Idrottsparken, Norrköping (Formerly known as Platinumcars Arena, Östgötaporten, Nya Parken)
- Capacity: 16,000
- Chairman: Martin Gyllix
- Manager: Eldar Abdulic
- League: Superettan
- 2025: Allsvenskan, 14th of 16 (relegated)
- Website: www.ifknorrkoping.se
Home colours	Away colours	Third colours

Idrottsföreningen Kamraterna Norrköping, more commonly known as IFK Norrköping or simply Norrköping, is a Swedish professional football club based in Norrköping. The club is affiliated to Östergötlands Fotbollförbund and play their home games at Idrottsparken. The club colours, reflected in their crest and kit, are white and blue.

Formed on 29 May 1897, the club have won thirteen national championship titles and six national cup titles. IFK Norrköping were most successful during the 1940s when they won five Swedish championships and two Svenska Cupen titles under the Hungarian coach Lajos Czeizler and with players like Gunnar Nordahl and Nils Liedholm on the team. IFK Norrköpings most recent championship win came in the 2015 Allsvenskan, their first league title since 1989.

== History ==
=== Founding and early years ===
Some of the original founders of the club.

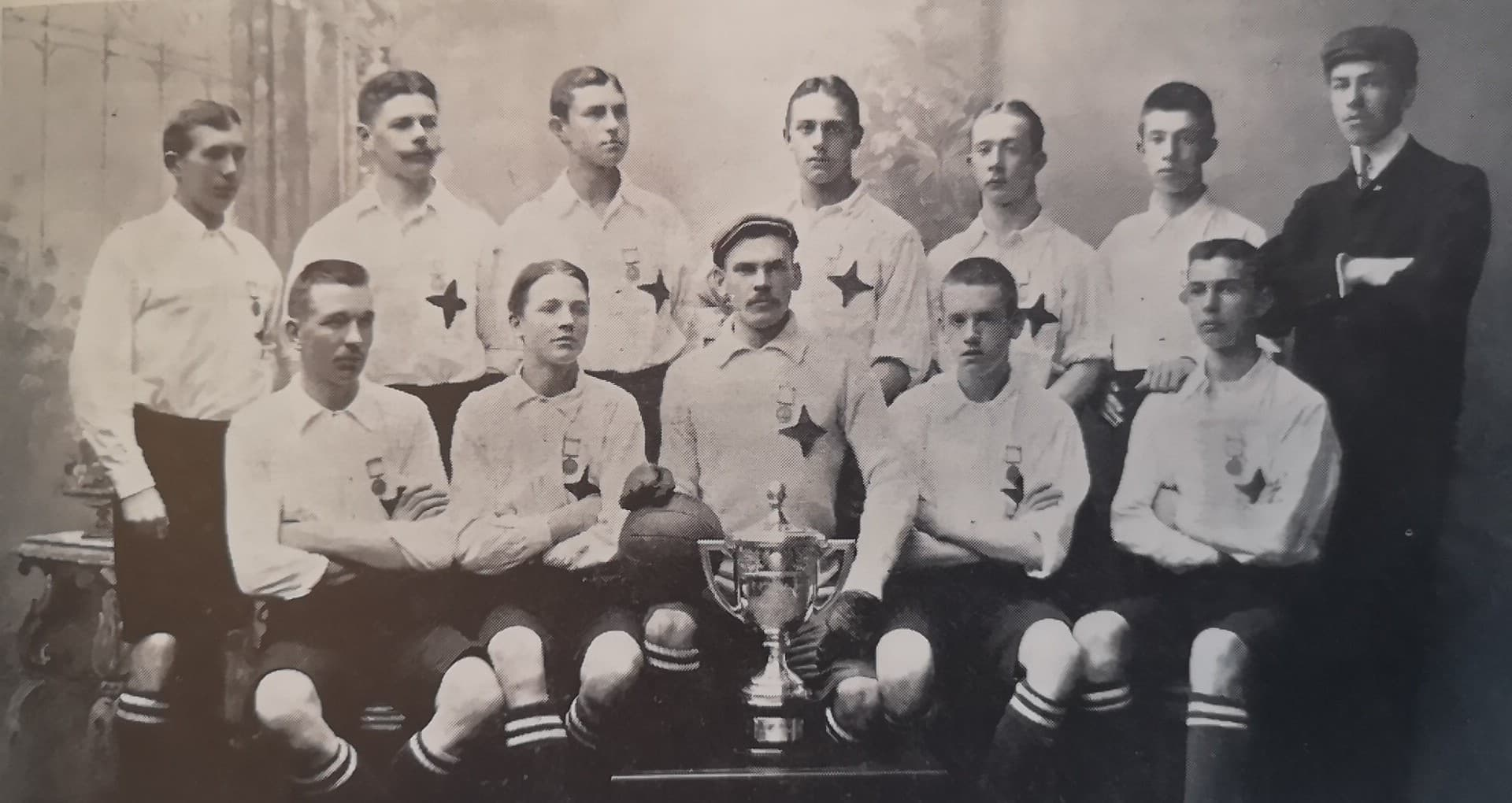
The IFK Norrköping football team of 1904.

IFK Norrköping was founded in 1897 by a group of teenage boys. They were inspired by what they had read in the youth newspaper Kamraten about the formation of the Idrottsföreningen Kamraterna group of sports clubs around the country and decided to create their own in Norrköping. The first years of the club was mainly dedicated to ice skating and athletics but in 1902 they fielded their first ever football team.

During the 1910s and 1920s Norrköping took part in all the seasons of the Svenska Serien league which was the first national football league in Sweden before the Swedish football league system was established with Allsvenskan as its top tier. Their best result came in the very first edition where they finished in fourth place.

When Allsvenskan started in 1924 they were again part of the very first season of Swedens new top league. They would stay there until the 1929–30 Allsvenskan season when they were relegated to the second tier where they would spend most of the 1930s.

=== The golden era ===
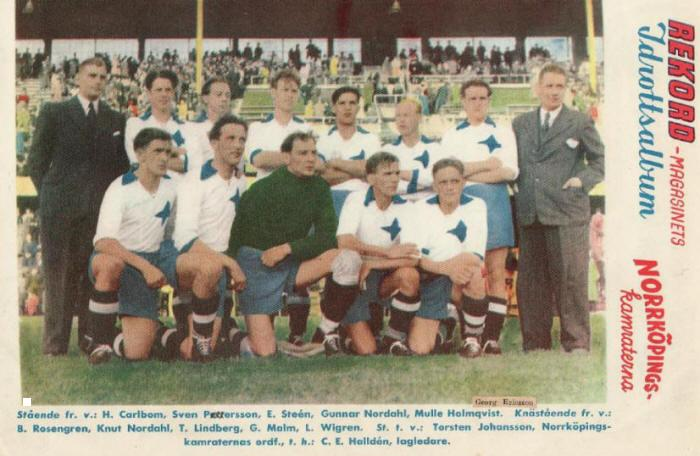
1944–45 Allsvenskan champions IFK Norrköping.

After returning to top flight football in the 1940s the club saw the start of their golden era. A key component to their success was their strategy of scouting and recruiting players from small clubs across the entire country instead of just locally which was the norm at the time.

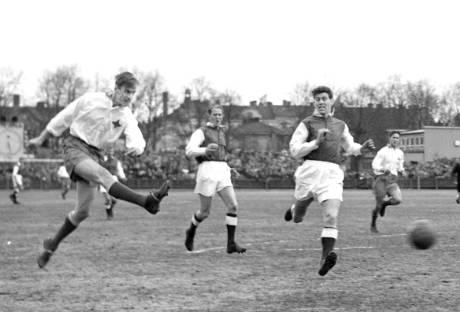
A game against Sandvikens IF during Norrköpings title winning 1956–57 Allsvenskan season.

During the 1940s the club became swedish champions four times followed by another six titles during the 1950s and 1960s. They also won three Svenska Cupen titles during this period and participated in european tournaments such as the European Cup and UEFA Cup Winners' Cup where they played against teams like S.L. Benfica, AC Milan and FC Schalke 04.

=== Recent years ===
On 31 October 2015, IFK Norrköping won its 13th championship title after defeating the defending champions Malmö FF with 2–0 away at Swedbank Stadion in Malmö in the last round of 2015 Allsvenskan. On 8 November that same year IFK Norrköping won the last ever edition of Svenska Supercupen, beating Svenska Cupen winners IFK Göteborg 3–0.

== Kit ==
IFK Norrköping has always played in white shirts and blue shorts. Unlike most teams they do not have their club badge on the left side of their chest, but instead use the Idrottsföreningen Kamraterna star.

In late 2026 the club announced that they had signed a five year deal with shirt manufacturer Nike starting in 2027.

The blue Idrottsföreningen Kamraterna star.

Period	Kit manufacturer	Shirt sponsor (chest)
1987–1991	(Germany) Adidas	Holmen
1992–1997	(England) Umbro	Holmen
1998	(United States) Nike	Holmen
1999–2003	(England) Umbro	Holmen
2004–2013	(Germany) Puma	Holmen
2014–2021	(United States) Nike	Holmen
2022–2026	(Germany) Adidas	Holmen
2027–	(United States) Nike	Holmen

== Recent seasons ==
Summary of the ten most recent seasons for IFK Norrköping:

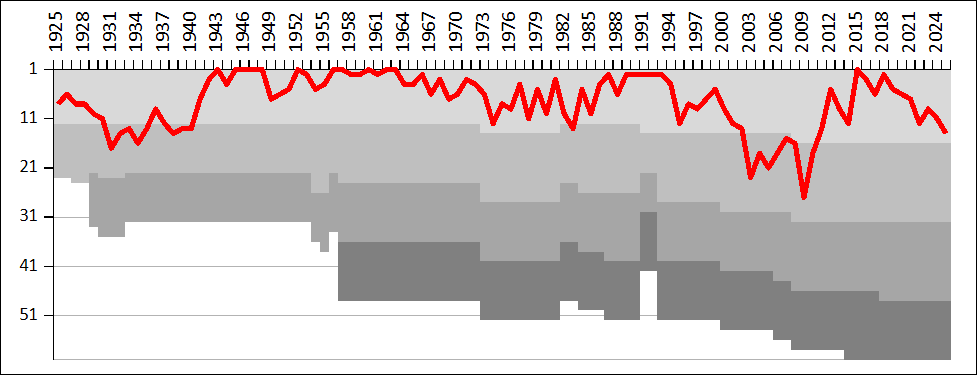
A chart showing the progress of IFK Norrköping through the swedish football league system. The different shades of gray represent league divisions.

Season	Division	Tier	Pos	Pl	W	D	L	+	-	P	Cup	Attendances
2016	Allsvenskan	1	3	30	18	6	6	59	37	60	Final	10,449
2017	Allsvenskan	1	6	30	14	6	10	45	40	48	Group stage	9,003
2018	Allsvenskan	1	2	30	19	8	3	51	27	65	Group stage	9,172
2019	Allsvenskan	1	5	30	16	9	5	54	26	57	Group stage	8,476
2020	Allsvenskan	1	6	30	13	7	10	60	46	46	Quarterfinals	0
2021	Allsvenskan	1	7	30	13	5	12	45	41	44	Quarterfinals	3,612
2022	Allsvenskan	1	12	30	8	10	12	40	42	34	Quarterfinals	7,973
2023	Allsvenskan	1	9	30	12	5	13	45	45	41	Quarterfinals	8,050
2024	Allsvenskan	1	11	30	9	7	14	36	57	34	Semifinals	8,073
2025	Allsvenskan	1	↓ 14	30	8	5	17	40	57	29	Group stage	8,259

== Stadium ==
IFK Norrköping play their home games at Idrottsparken. Originally built in 1903 and majorly renovated in 2009 the ground has a max capacity of around 16,000 people. During the 1958 FIFA World Cup the stadium hosted two group stage matches and one quarterfinal as well as hosting three group stage matches at the UEFA Euro 1992.

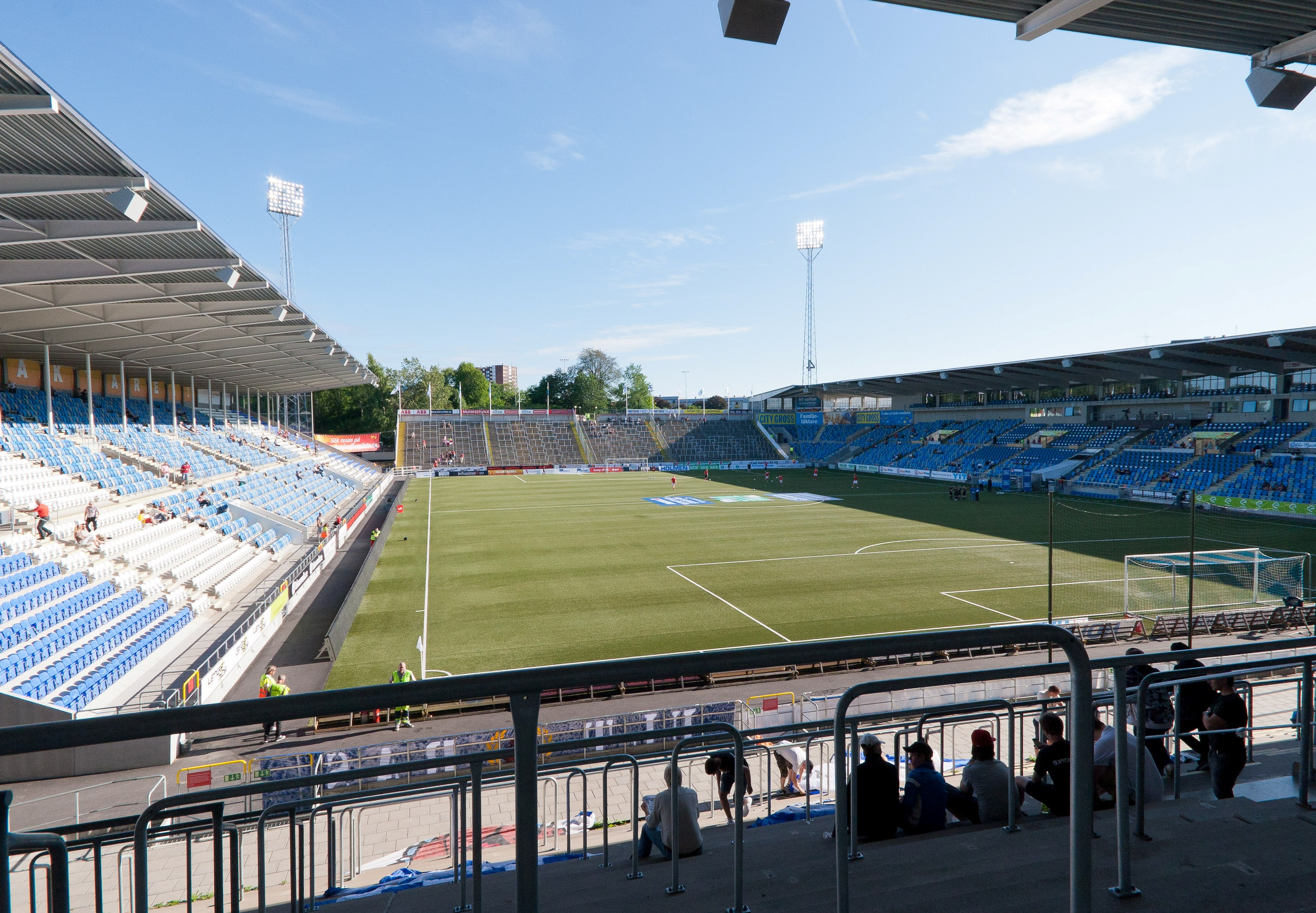
Idrottsparken in 2011.

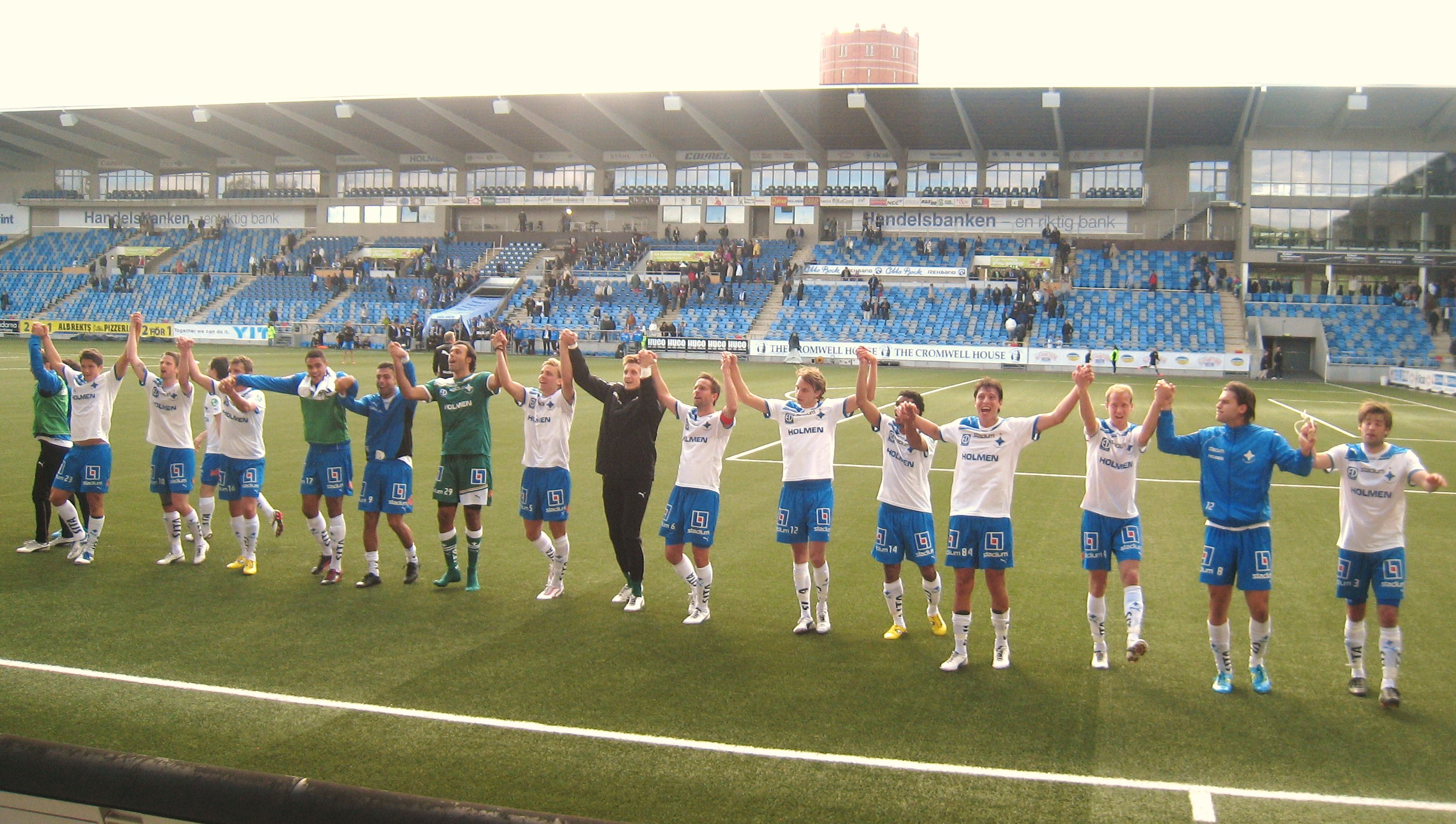
The team celebrating a home win in the 2012 Allsvenskan.

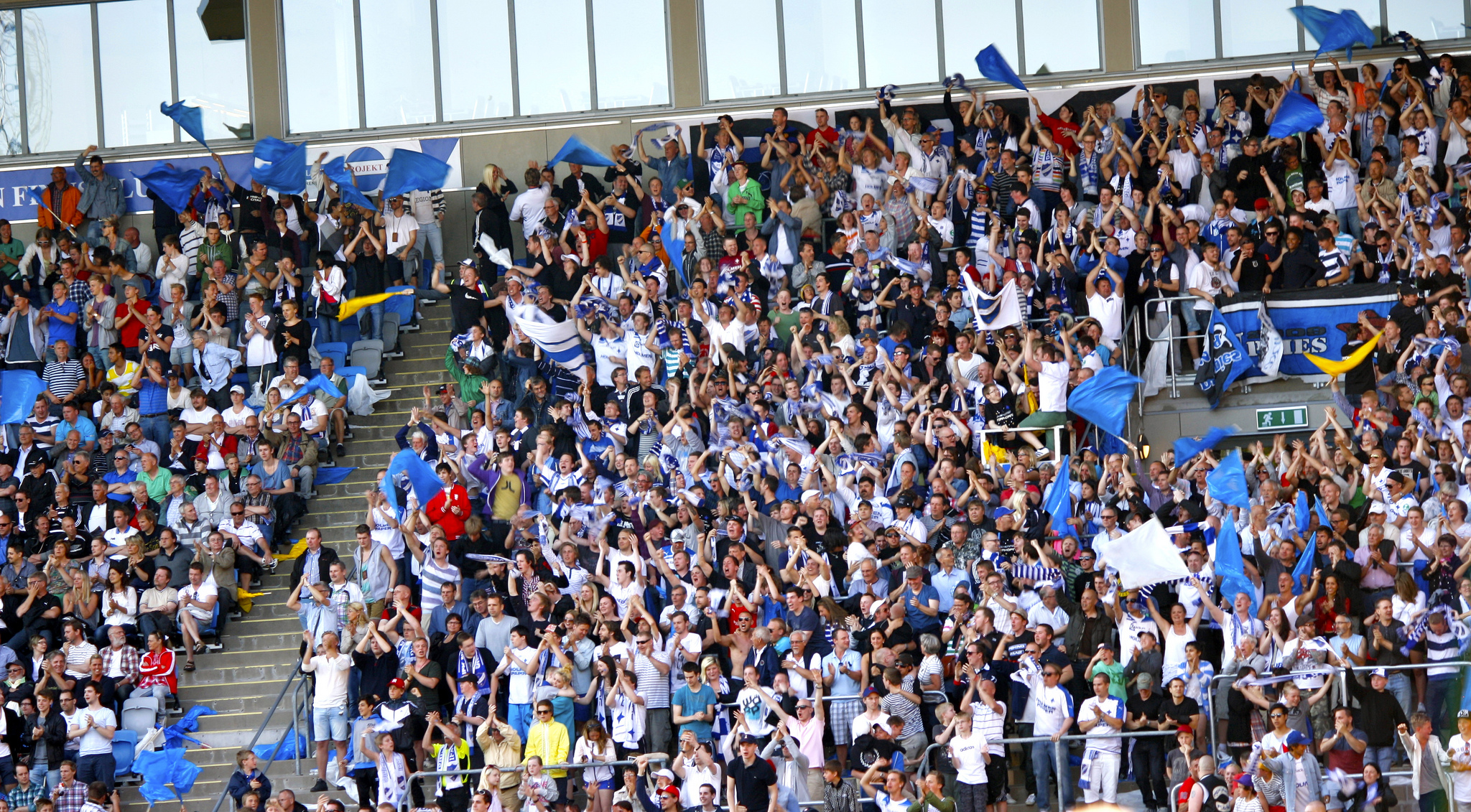
IFK Norrköping supporter group Peking Fanz.

== Players ==
=== First-team squad ===
As of 6 October 2026

Note: Flags indicate national team as defined under FIFA eligibility rules; some limited exceptions apply. Players may hold more than one non-FIFA nationality.

No.	Pos.	Nation	Player
1	GK	SWE	Theo Krantz
3	MF	SWE	Viggo Fälth
4	DF	NOR	Jonas Weber
5	FW	SWE	Christoffer Nyman (captain)
6	MF	SWE	Viktor Christiansson
7	MF	SWE	Alexander Fransson
8	FW	ENG	Ryan Nelson
9	FW	SWE	Tim Prica
10	FW	LAT	Albert Aleksanjan
11	FW	SWE	Elias Jemal
14	FW	ISL	Ísak Andri Sigurgeirsson
15	FW	BFA	Kylian Seka
18	MF	SWE	Hugo Ringsten
19	MF	SWE	Leo Lif

No.	Pos.	Nation	Player
20	MF	SWE	Axel Brönner
22	FW	SEN	Mbaye Cissé
23	DF	NOR	Aleksander Opsahl
24	DF	SWE	Anton Eriksson
25	DF	SWE	Filip Dagerstål
30	DF	NOR	Fabian Holst-Larsen
31	DF	SWE	Algot Hjelm
34	MF	SWE	Noel Sernelius
35	MF	GHA	Stephen Bolma
37	DF	TUN	Moutaz Neffati
38	MF	SWE	Ture Sandberg
40	GK	SWE	Hugo Fagerberg (on loan from Mjällby AIF)
91	GK	MKD	David Mitov Nilsson

=== Retired numbers ===
- 12 – Fans of the club

=== Notable players ===
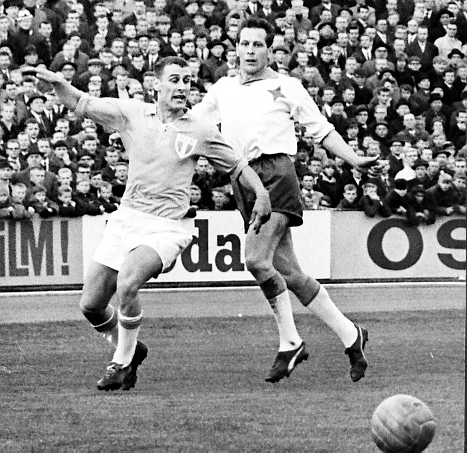
Åke "Bajdoff" Johansson (right) playing in a 1964 game against Malmö FF.

==== Winners of Guldbollen ====
- 1947: (Sweden) Gunnar Nordahl
- 1949: (Sweden) Knut Nordahl
- 1953: (Sweden) Bengt "Julle" Gustavsson
- 1957: (Sweden) Åke "Bajdoff" Johansson
- 1960: (Sweden) Torbjörn Jonsson
- 1961: (Sweden) Bengt "Zamora" Nyholm
- 1963: (Sweden) Harry Bild
- 1966: (Sweden) Ove Kindvall
- 1968: (Sweden) Björn Nordqvist
- 1990: (Sweden) Tomas Brolin
- 1992: (Sweden) Jan Eriksson

==== League top scorers ====
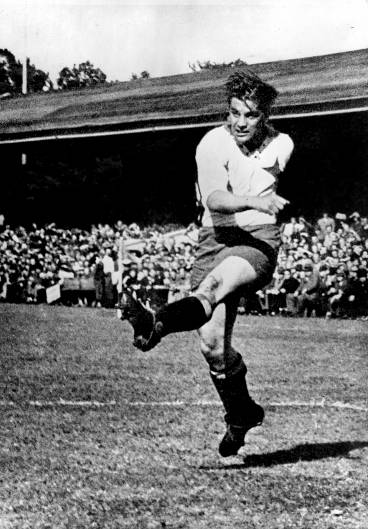
Gunnar Nordahl went on to score 210 goals in 257 games for AC Milan after leaving IFK Norrköping.

===== Allsvenskan =====
- (Sweden) Gunnar Nordahl 1944–45 (27 goals), 1945–46 (25 goals) and 1947–48 (18 goals)
- (Sweden) Harry Bild 1956–57 (19 goals)
- (Sweden) Henry "Putte" Källgren 1957–58 (27 goals) (shared with Bertil Johansson, IFK Göteborg)
- (Sweden) Ove Kindvall 1966 (20 goals)
- (Sweden) Jan Hellström 1989 (16 goals)
- (Sweden) Niclas Kindvall 1994 (23 goals)
- (Sweden) Imad Khalili 2013 (15 goals) (eight goals scored for Helsingborgs IF)
- (Sweden) Emir Kujović 2015 (21 goals)
- (Sweden) Kalle Holmberg 2017 (14 goals) (shared with Magnus Eriksson, Djurgårdens IF)
- (Sweden) Christoffer Nyman 2020 (18 goals)
- (Nigeria) Samuel Adegbenro 2021 (17 goals)

===== Superettan (Division II 1924/1925–1986 and Division I 1987–1999) =====
- (Sweden) Stefan Pettersson 1983 (17 goals)
- (Brazil) Bruno Santos 2005 (17 goals)
- (Iceland) Garðar Gunnlaugsson 2007 (18 goals)

== Management ==
=== Technical staff ===
As of 12 October 2026

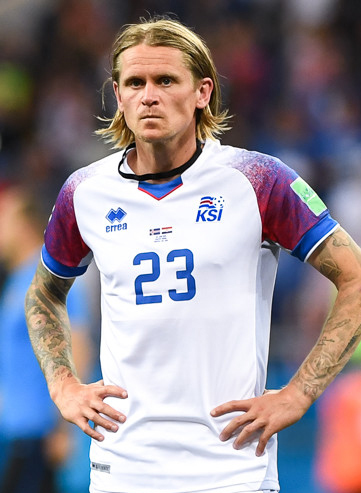
Assistant coach Ari Skúlason represented Iceland at the 2018 FIFA World Cup.

Name	Role
(Sweden) Henrik Jurelius	Sports director
(Sweden) (Bosnia and Herzegovina) Eldar Abdulic	Head coach
(Sweden) Kim Vaattovaara	Assistant coach
(Northern Ireland) Thomas Stewart	Assistant coach
(Iceland) Ari Skúlason	Assistant coach
(Sweden) Jesper Sandberg	Transition coach
(Sweden) Jonas Bylund	Goalkeeping coach
(Iceland) Pálmar Hreinsson	Fitness coach
(Sweden) Jacob Dahl	Analyst & scouting
(Sweden) Peter Cratz	Club doctor
(Sweden) Bengt Janzon	Club doctor
(Sweden) Nicolas Santi Aguilar	Physiotherapist
(Sweden) Axel Lundquist	Physiotherapist
(Sweden) Kristoffer Karlsson	Physiotherapist
(Sweden) Daniel Ekvall	Mental coach
(Sweden) Simon Larsson	Equipment manager
(Sweden) Tobias Falk	Coordinator

=== Managerial history ===
List of IFK Norrköping managers (1905–present)

- (Scotland) Alexander "Sandy" Tait (1905)
- (England) Fred Spiksley (1910)
- (England) Herbert Butterworth (1921–22)
- (Hungary) Imre Schlosser (1923–24)
- (Sweden) Rudolf Haglund (1925–35)
- (Sweden) Sölve Flisberg (1936)
- (Sweden) Vilgot Lindberg (1936–37)
- (Sweden) Torsten Johansson (1937–38)
- (Sweden) Bengt Flisberg (1938–41)
- (Sweden) Rudolf Haglund (1941)
- (Hungary) Lajos Czeizler (1942–48)
- (England) Eric Keen (1949)
- (Austria) Karl Adamek (1950–53)
- (Sweden) Torsten Lindberg (1954)
- (Austria) Karl Adamek (1955–57)
- (Hungary) Vilmos Varszegi (1957–62)
- (Sweden) Georg Ericson (1958–66)
- (Sweden) Gunnar Nordahl (1967–70)
- (Sweden) Gösta Löfgren (1971–72)
- (Sweden) Örjan Martinsson (1973–74)
- (Sweden) Bengt Gustavsson (1975–78)
- (Sweden) Gunnar Nordahl (1979–80)
- (Sweden) Bo Axberg (1981–82)
- (Sweden) Lars-Göran Qwist (1983–84)
- (Sweden) Kent Karlsson (1985–89)
- (Sweden) Jörgen Augustsson (1990)
- (Sweden) Sanny Åslund (1991–92)
- (Sweden) Sören Cratz (1993–94)
- (Sweden) Kent Karlsson (1995)
- (Sweden) Tomas Nordahl (1995)
- (England) Colin Toal (1996–97)
- (Sweden) Olle Nordin (1997–00)
- (Sweden) Tor-Arne Fredheim (2001)
- (Sweden) Bengt-Arne Strömberg (2002)
- (Sweden) Håkan Ericson (2002–03)
- (Sweden) Stefan Hellberg (2004–05)
- (Sweden) Mats Jingblad (2005–08)
- (Sweden) Sören Cratz (2007–08)
- (Sweden) Göran Bergort (2009–10)
- (Sweden) Janne Andersson (1 January 2011 – 23 June 2016)
- (Sweden) Jens Gustafsson (24 June 2016 – 19 December 2020)
- (Sweden) Rikard Norling (23 December 2020 – 11 July 2022)
- (Sweden) Anes Mravac (11 July 2022 – 8 August 2022) Caretaker
- (Sweden) Vedran Vucicevic (11 July 2022 – 8 August 2022) Caretaker
- (Denmark) Glen Riddersholm (8 August 2022 – 13 November 2023)
- (Sweden) Andreas Alm (29 December 2023 – 9 December 2024)
- (Sweden) Martin Falk (21 December 2024 – 16 December 2025)
- (Sweden) Eldar Abdulic (16 December 2025 – present)

== Honours ==
=== League ===
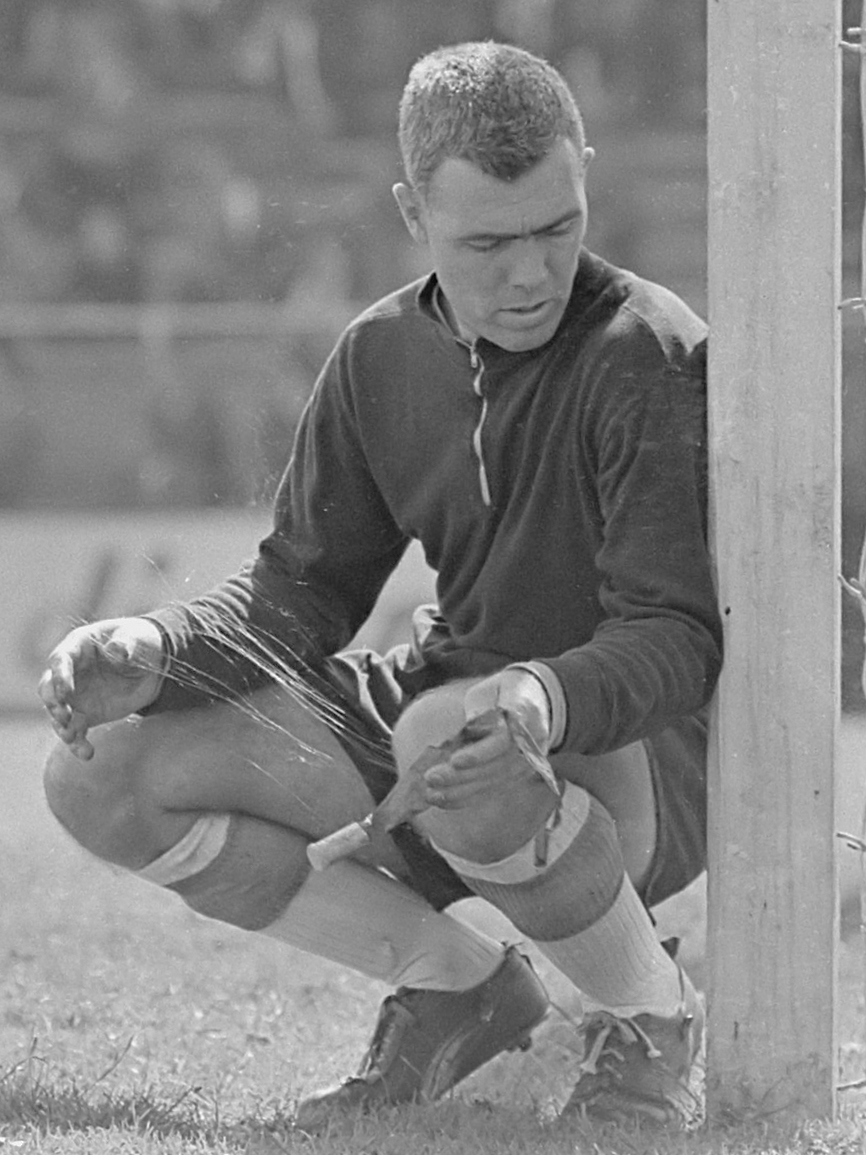
1963: Bengt Nyholm, the keeper of IFK Norrköping, tries to improve his effectiveness by applying glue from flypaper to his hands

- Swedish Champions (Note: The title of "Swedish Champions" has been awarded to the winner of four different competitions over the years. Between 1896 and 1925 the title was awarded to the winner of Svenska Mästerskapet, a stand-alone cup tournament. No club were given the title between 1926 and 1930 even though the first-tier league Allsvenskan was played. In 1931 the title was reinstated and awarded to the winner of Allsvenskan. Between 1982 and 1990 a play-off in cup format was held at the end of the league season to decide the champions. After the play-off format in 1991 and 1992 the title was decided by the winner of Mästerskapsserien, an additional league after the end of Allsvenskan. Since the 1993 season the title has once again been awarded to the winner of Allsvenskan.)
  - Winners (13): 1942–43, 1944–45, 1945–46, 1946–47, 1947–48, 1951–52, 1955–56, 1956–57, 1960, 1962, 1963, 1989, 2015
- Allsvenskan:
  - Winners (12): 1942–43, 1944–45, 1945–46, 1946–47, 1947–48, 1951–52, 1955–56, 1956–57, 1960, 1962, 1963, 2015
  - Runners-up (10): 1952–53, 1957–58, 1959, 1961, 1966, 1987, 1989, 1990, 1993, 2018
- Superettan:
  - Winners (1): 2007
  - Runners-up (1): 2010
- Mästerskapsserien:
  - Runners-up (2): 1991, 1992

=== Cups ===
- Svenska Cupen:
  - Winners (6): 1943, 1945, 1968–69, 1987–88, 1990–91, 1993–94
  - Runners-up (5): 1944, 1953, 1967, 1971–72, 2016–17
- Svenska Supercupen:
  - Winners (1): 2015

== IFK Norrköping in Europe ==
Season	Competition	Round	Club	Home	Away	Aggregate
1956–57	European Cup	1R	(Italy) Florentina	0–1	1–1	1–2
1957–58	European Cup	1R	(Socialist Federal Republic of Yugoslavia) Red Star Belgrade	2–2	1–2	3–4
1962–63	European Cup	PR	(Albania) Partizani Tirana	2–0	1–1	3–1
1962–63	European Cup	1R	(Portugal) Benfica	1–1	1–5	2–6
1963–64	European Cup	PR	(Belgium) Standard Liége	2–0	0–1	2–1
1963–64	European Cup	1R	(Italy) Milan	1–1	2–5	3–6
1968–69	European Cup Winners' Cup	1R	(Northern Ireland) Crusaders	4–1	2–2	6–3
1968–69	European Cup Winners' Cup	2R	(Norway) Lyn	3–2	0–2	3–4
1969–70	European Cup Winners' Cup	1R	(Malta) Sliema Wanderers	5–1	0–1	5–2
1969–70	European Cup Winners' Cup	2R	(West Germany) Schalke 04	0–0	0–1	0–1
1972–73	UEFA Cup	1R	(Romania) UTA Arad	2–0	2–1	4–1
1972–73	UEFA Cup	2R	(Italy) Inter Milan	0–2	2–2	2–4
1978–79	UEFA Cup	1R	(Scotland) Hibernian	0–0	2–3	2–3
1982–83	UEFA Cup	1R	(England) Southampton	0–0	2–2	2–2 (a)
1982–83	UEFA Cup	2R	(Italy) Roma	1–0	0–1 (2–4 p)	1–1
1988–89	European Cup Winners' Cup	1R	(Italy) Sampdoria	2–1	0–2	2–3
1990–91	UEFA Cup	1R	(Germany) 1. FC Köln	0–0	1–3	1–3
1991–92	European Cup Winners' Cup	1R	(Luxembourg) Jeunesse Esch	4–0	2–1	6–1
1991–92	European Cup Winners' Cup	2R	(France) Monaco	1–2	0–1	1–3
1992–93	UEFA Cup	1R	(Italy) Torino	1–0	0–3	1–3
1993–94	UEFA Cup	1R	(Belgium) KV Mechelen	0–1	1–1 (aet)	1–2
1994–95	UEFA Cup Winners' Cup	QR	(Czech Republic) Viktoria Žižkov	3–3	0–1	3–4
2000–01	UEFA Cup	QR	(Faroe Islands) GÍ	2–1	2–0	4–1
2000–01	UEFA Cup	1R	(Czech Republic) Slovan Liberec	2–2	1–2	3–4
2016–17	UEFA Champions League	2Q	(Norway) Rosenborg	3–2	1–3	4–5
2017–18	UEFA Europa League	1Q	(Kosovo) Prishtina	5–0	1–0	6–0
2017–18	UEFA Europa League	2Q	(Lithuania) Trakai	2–1	1–2 (3–5 p)	3–3
2019–20	UEFA Europa League	1Q	(Republic of Ireland) St Patrick's Athletic	2–1	2–0	4–1
2019–20	UEFA Europa League	2Q	(Latvia) Liepāja	2–0	1–0	3–0
2019–20	UEFA Europa League	3Q	(Israel) Hapoel Be'er Sheva	1–1	1–3	2–4

== Records ==
Christoffer Nyman in 2025.

- Most played games (Allsvenskan or Division I):

(Sweden) Christoffer Nyman, 322 games (2011–2016, 2019–)

- Most league goals (Allsvenskan or Division I):

(Sweden) Henry "Putte" Källgren, 126 goals (1951–60)

- Most spectators:

32 234 against Malmö FF, 7 June 1956

- Biggest victory (Allsvenskan or Division I):

11–1 against Djurgårdens IF, 14 October 1945.

- Biggest defeat (Allsvenskan or Division I):

0 – 11 against Örgryte IS, 6 April 1928 and Helsingborgs IF, 22 September 1929

== Affiliate clubs ==
- (Sweden) IF Sylvia
- (Sweden) Husqvarna FF
- (Australia) Western United FC

== Other sections ==
IFK Norrköping also maintains departments for women's football, set up in 2009, orienteering, bowling and bandy. The bandy team played in Sweden's highest division in 1937.

Part of the club was also an ice hockey team which played in the seasons 1950/51 and 1955/56 in the highest Swedish division. The ice hockey teams of IFK and local rivals IK Sleipner were joined in 1967 to form IF IFK/IKS, known from 1973 forward as IK Vita Hästen ("Ice Hockey Club White Horse") which evolved into today's HC Vita Hästen.
