= IS Halmia =

Swedish football club

- Full name: Idrottssällskapet Halmia
- Founded: 16 June 1907
- Ground: Örjans vall, Halmstad; Sweden
- Capacity: 16,000
- Chairman: Anders Nelson
- League: Division 3 Västra Götaland
- 2020: Division 2 Västra Götaland, 13th (Relegated)
Home colours	Away colours

IS Halmia is a football club located in Halmstad, Sweden.

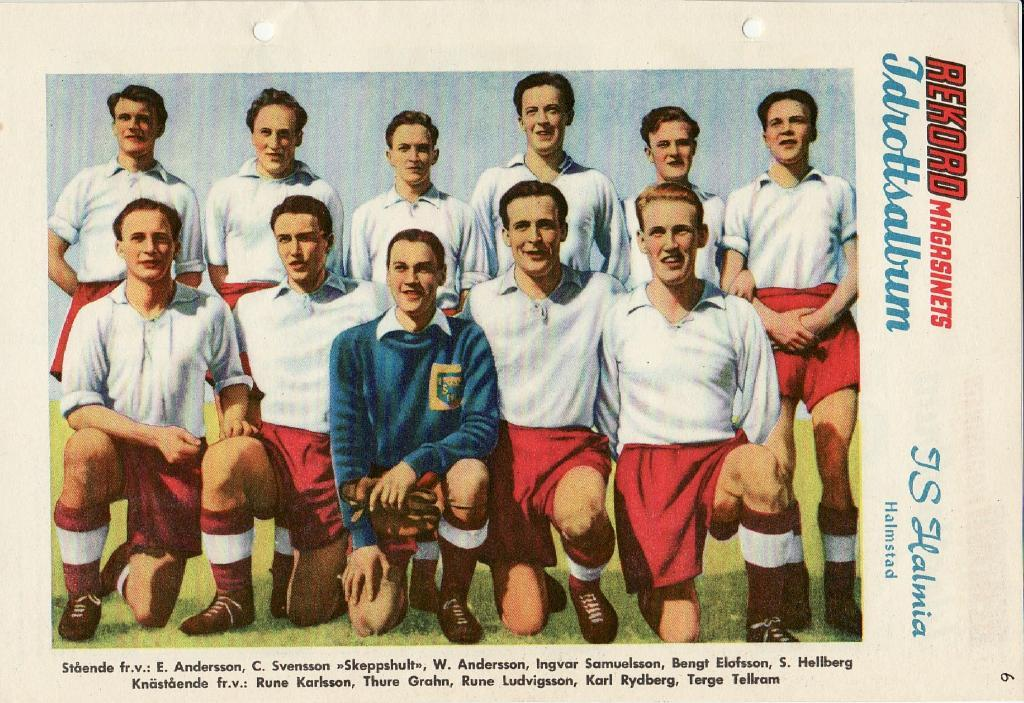
Halmia's team in 1950, the club's heyday

== Background ==
IS Halmia was founded on 16 June 1907 and currently plays in Division 3 Sydästra Götaland. The club originally ran football, track and field athletics, gymnastics and amateur wrestling.

In early years, the club also played bandy. The first bandy game between two organised teams in Halland is thought to have been played between Halmia and local rival Halmstads BK in 1922. In 1932 Halmia won the Halland district championship in this sport. In 1933, the handball team won the Halland district championship.

In 1932 the club also became the first team from Halmstad to reach the Allsvenskan, the top-tier football league in Sweden.

In total IS Halmia has played 11 seasons in the Allsvenskan, the last time being in 1979. The club's best spell was from 1944 until 1950 when they spent seven seasons at the top level. They have also enjoyed 44 seasons playing second-tier Swedish football. However, they have been less successful in recent years.

The club shares Örjans vall with its rival of many years, Halmstads BK. They still hold the record attendance of 20,381 spectators for a promotion playoff match in 1962. IS Halmia are affiliated to the Hallands Fotbollförbund.

Key dates in the history of IS Halmia are as follows;

- 1907: The club was formed on 16 June 1907 with Axel Hagnell as chairman. The programme included football, athletics, gymnastics and wrestling.
- 1909: Lost 0–11 to Helsingborgs IF, a record defeat that still stands.
- 1912: Became Halmia Halland champions for the first time by defeating Halmstad IF 5–3 in the final.
- 1924: Played in Division 2 Sydsvenskan for the first time and finished fifth.
- 1925: Lost to IFK Uddevalla in the promotion playoffs after winning Division 2 Sydsvenskan.
- 1932: Played in the Allsvenskan for the first time. Herbert Samuelsson signs from IFK Göteborg.
- 1934: Relegated from the Allsvenskan.
- 1940: After winning the Division 2 Södra title failed in the promotion playoff against Degerfors IF.
- 1943: Regained place in the Allsvenskan after winning the Division 2 Södra title and the promotion playoff against Örgryte IS.
- 1944: Finished seventh in the Allsvenskan – a feat that was to be repeated in 1947 and 1948.
- 1950: Relegated from the Allsvenskan but went to the semifinals of the Swedish Cup.
- 1962: Winners of Division 2 Västra Götaland and won the promotion playoff group comprising AIK, Landskrona BoIS and IFK Holmsund.
- 1963: Disastrous season back in the Allsvenskan winning only one game.
- 1970: The club started running ladies' teams.
- 1974: Frank Marshall was recruited as club coach with a promise that Allsvenskan football would be achieved within 5 years – a promise that he accomplished.
- 1978: The club win Division 2 Södra and are promoted to the Allsvenskan.
- 1979: Finished bottom of the Allsvenskan, winning just two games.
- 1989: Relegated to Division 3 Sydvästra Götaland bringing tier 4 football to Örjans vall for the first time. The league proved to be a real hornet's nest with many excellent Halland teams.
- 1991: A grim year for men's football with demotion to Division 4 Halland representing tier 5 football just 12 years after playing in the top tier. A missed penalty in the season's final match against Gislaved IS proved crucial.
- 1992: The club win Division 4 Halland.
- 1993: Another promotion with the club winning the Division 3 Sydvästra Götaland title.
- 1997: Winners of Division 2 Södra Götaland and won the promotion playoffs against Trollhättans FK and Nybro IF.

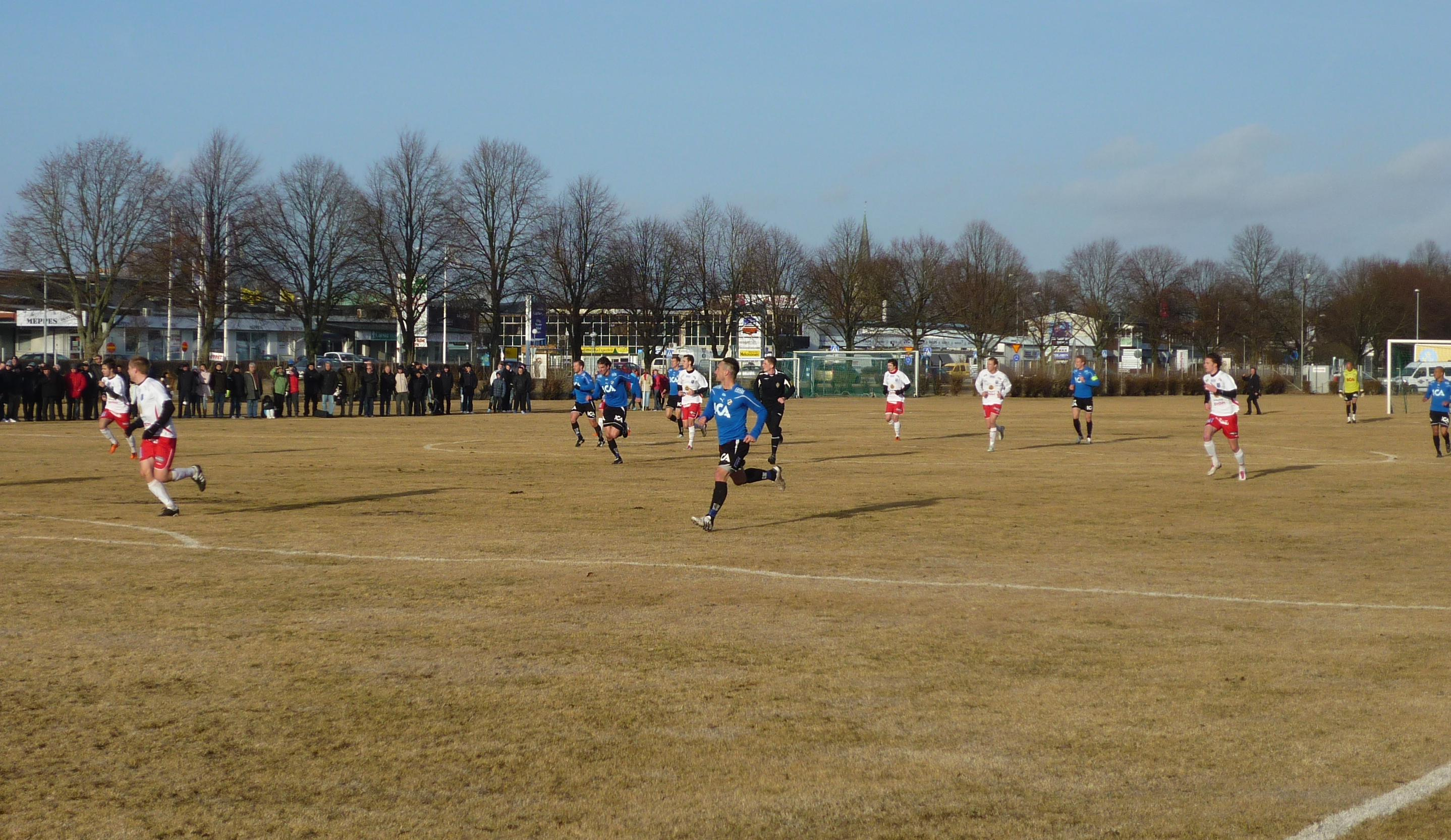
IS Halmia playing Halmstads BK in a pre-season friendly in 2011

- 1998: Finishing last in Division 1 Södra proves a bitter disappointment.
- 1999: Another relegation this time from Division 2 Södra Götaland.
- 2000: The club face life in Division 3 Sydvästra Götaland with bankruptcy and the loss of coach Bjorn Andersson to Bayern Munich.
- 2006: The club stabilises and the finances are under control but on the playing front following league re-structuring the first team are again playing tier 5 football.
- 2008: Winners of Division 3 Sydvästra Götaland and are promoted.
- 2012: Winners of Division 2 Södra Götaland.
- 2015: Relegated from Division 1 Södra.
- 2018: Finished runners-up in Division 2 Västra Götaland and therefore entered the promotion playoffs.
- 2020: Relegated from Division 2 Västra Götaland.

== Season to season ==
Season	Level	Division	Section	Position	Movements
1923–24	Tier 2	Division 2	Sydsvenskan	5th	
1924–25	Tier 2	Division 2	Sydsvenskan	1st	Promotion Playoff
1925–26	Tier 2	Division 2	Sydsvenskan	8th	
1926–27	Tier 2	Division 2	Sydsvenskan	3rd	
1927–28	Tier 2	Division 2	Sydsvenskan	5th	
1928–29	Tier 2	Division 2	Södra	9th	
1929–30	Tier 2	Division 2	Södra	8th	
1930–31	Tier 2	Division 2	Södra	6th	
1931–32	Tier 2	Division 2	Södra	1st	Promoted
1932–33	Tier 1	Allsvenskan		10th	
1933–34	Tier 1	Allsvenskan		11th	Relegated
1934–35	Tier 2	Division 2	Södra	2nd	
1935–36	Tier 2	Division 2	Södra	8th	
1936–37	Tier 2	Division 2	Södra	8th	
1937–38	Tier 2	Division 2	Södra	8th	
1938–39	Tier 2	Division 2	Södra	2nd	
1939–40	Tier 2	Division 2	Södra	1st	Promotion Playoff
1940–41	Tier 2	Division 2	Södra	2nd	
1941–42	Tier 2	Division 2	Södra	2nd	
1942–43	Tier 2	Division 2	Södra	1st	Promotion Playoff – Promoted
1943–44	Tier 1	Allsvenskan		7th	
1944–45	Tier 1	Allsvenskan		9th	
1945–46	Tier 1	Allsvenskan		9th	
1946–47	Tier 1	Allsvenskan		7th	
1947–48	Tier 1	Allsvenskan		7th	
1948–49	Tier 1	Allsvenskan		9th	
1949–50	Tier 1	Allsvenskan		12th	Relegated
1950–51	Tier 2	Division 2	Sydvästra	3rd	
1951–52	Tier 2	Division 2	Sydvästra	7th	
1952–53	Tier 2	Division 2	Sydvästra	10th	Relegated
1953–54	Tier 3	Division 3	Södra Götaland	1st	Promoted
1954–55	Tier 2	Division 2	Götaland	14th	Relegated
1955–56	Tier 3	Division 3	Sydvästra Götaland	1st	Promoted
1956–57	Tier 2	Division 2	Västra Götaland	6th	
1957–58	Tier 2	Division 2	Västra Götaland	9th	
1959	Tier 2	Division 2	Västra Götaland	12th	Relegated
1960	Tier 3	Division 3	Sydvästra Götaland	1st	Promoted
1961	Tier 2	Division 2	Västra Götaland	2nd	
1962	Tier 2	Division 2	Västra Götaland	1st	Promotion Playoff – Promoted
1963	Tier 1	Allsvenskan		12th	Relegated
1964	Tier 2	Division 2	Västra Götaland	5th	
1965	Tier 2	Division 2	Västra Götaland	6th	
1966	Tier 2	Division 2	Södra Götaland	6th	
1967	Tier 2	Division 2	Södra Götaland	3rd	
1968	Tier 2	Division 2	Södra Götaland	8th	
1969	Tier 2	Division 2	Södra Götaland	5th	
1970	Tier 2	Division 2	Södra Götaland	9th	
1971	Tier 2	Division 2	Södra Götaland	4th	
1972	Tier 2	Division 2	Södra	5th	
1973	Tier 2	Division 2	Södra	7th	
1974	Tier 2	Division 2	Södra	7th	
1975	Tier 2	Division 2	Södra	6th	
1976	Tier 2	Division 2	Södra	8th	
1977	Tier 2	Division 2	Södra	6th	
1978	Tier 2	Division 2	Södra	1st	Promoted
1979	Tier 1	Allsvenskan		14th	Relegated
1980	Tier 2	Division 2	Södra	8th	
1981	Tier 2	Division 2	Södra	2nd	
1982	Tier 2	Division 2	Södra	7th	
1983	Tier 2	Division 2	Södra	5th	
1984	Tier 2	Division 2	Södra	10th	
1985	Tier 2	Division 2	Södra	14th	Relegated
1986	Tier 3	Division 3	Sydvästra Götaland	5th	Relegation Playoff
1987	Tier 3	Division 2	Västra	7th	
1988	Tier 3	Division 2	Södra	13th	Relegated
1989	Tier 4	Division 3	Sydvästra Götaland	3rd	
1990	Tier 4	Division 3	Södra Götaland	8th	
1991	Tier 4	Division 3	Sydvästra Götaland	10th	Relegated
1992	Tier 5	Division 4	Halland	1st	Promoted
1993	Tier 4	Division 3	Sydvästra Götaland	1st	Promoted
1994	Tier 3	Division 2	Södra Götaland	8th	
1995	Tier 3	Division 2	Södra Götaland	8th	
1996	Tier 3	Division 2	Södra Götaland	9th	
1997	Tier 3	Division 2	Södra Götaland	2nd	Promotion Playoffs – Promoted
1998	Tier 2	Division 1	Södra	14th	Relegated
1999	Tier 3	Division 2	Södra Götaland	10th	Relegated
2000	Tier 4	Division 3	Sydvästra Götaland	6th	
2001	Tier 4	Division 3	Sydvästra Götaland	6th	
2002	Tier 4	Division 3	Sydvästra Götaland	8th	
2003	Tier 4	Division 3	Sydvästra Götaland	2nd	Promotion Playoffs
2004	Tier 4	Division 3	Sydvästra Götaland	6th	
2005	Tier 4	Division 3	Sydvästra Götaland	6th	
2006*	Tier 5	Division 3	Sydvästra Götaland	5th	
2007	Tier 5	Division 3	Sydvästra Götaland	3rd	
2008	Tier 5	Division 3	Sydvästra Götaland	1st	Promoted
2009	Tier 4	Division 2	Västra Götaland	6th	
2010	Tier 4	Division 2	Södra Götaland	2nd	
2011	Tier 4	Division 2	Västra Götaland	5th	
2012	Tier 4	Division 2	Södra Götaland	1st	Promoted
2013	Tier 3	Division 1	Södra	4th	
2014	Tier 3	Division 1	Södra	7th	
2015	Tier 3	Division 1	Södra	12th	Relegated
2016	Tier 4	Division 2	Västra Götaland	2nd	Promotion Playoffs
2017	Tier 4	Division 2	Västra Götaland	7th	
2018	Tier 4	Division 2	Västra Götaland	2nd	Promotion Playoffs
2019	Tier 4	Division 2	Västra Götaland	7th	
2020	Tier 4	Division 2	Västra Götaland	13th	Relegated
2021	Tier 5	Division 3	Sydvästra Götaland	2nd	

== Attendances ==
In recent seasons IS Halmia have had the following average attendances:

Season	Average Attendance	Division / Section	Level
2005	185	Div 3 Sydvästra Götaland	Tier 4
2006	165	Div 3 Sydvästra Götaland	Tier 5
2007	286	Div 3 Sydvästra Götaland	Tier 5
2008	276	Div 3 Sydvästra Götaland	Tier 5
2009	261	Div 2 Västra Götaland	Tier 4
2010	258	Div 2 Södra Götaland	Tier 4
2011	210	Div 2 Västra Götaland	Tier 4
2012	470	Div 2 Södra Götaland	Tier 4
2013	408	Div 1 Södra	Tier 3
2014	292	Div 1 Södra	Tier 3
2015	287	Div 1 Södra	Tier 3
2016	313	Div 2 Västra Götaland	Tier 4
2017	331	Div 2 Västra Götaland	Tier 4
2018	329	Div 2 Västra Götaland	Tier 4
2019	?	Div 2 Västra Götaland	Tier 4
2020	0	Div 2 Västra Götaland	Tier 4
2021	?	Div 3 Sydvästra Götaland	Tier 5

* Attendances are provided in the Publikliga sections of the Svenska Fotbollförbundet website.
