= 1947–48 Allsvenskan =

24th season of Allsvenskan

Allsvenskan
- Season: 1947–48
- Champions: IFK Norrköping
- Relegated: Djurgårdens IF; Halmstads BK
- Top goalscorer: Gunnar Nordahl, IFK Norrköping (18)
- Average attendance: 10,787

Statistics of Allsvenskan in season 1947/1948.

== Overview ==
The league was contested by 12 teams, with IFK Norrköping winning the championship.

== League table ==
Pos	Team	Pld	W	D	L	GF	GA	GD	Pts	Qualification or relegation
1	IFK Norrköping (C)	22	15	3	4	56	32	+24	33	
2	Malmö FF	22	12	5	5	60	33	+27	29	
3	AIK	22	12	3	7	51	34	+17	27	
4	Hälsingborgs IF	22	9	6	7	46	46	0	24	
5	IFK Göteborg	22	9	4	9	40	33	+7	22	
6	GAIS	22	7	6	9	36	41	−5	20	
7	IS Halmia	22	6	7	9	34	41	−7	19	
8	Degerfors IF	22	6	7	9	30	39	−9	19	
9	Jönköpings Södra IF	22	6	7	9	31	53	−22	19	
10	IF Elfsborg	22	7	4	11	40	51	−11	18	
11	Djurgårdens IF (R)	22	6	5	11	32	35	−3	17	Relegation to Division 2
12	Halmstads BK (R)	22	6	5	11	38	56	−18	17	Relegation to Division 2

Rules for classification: 1) points; 2) goal difference; 3) number of goals scored.
(C) Champions; (R) Relegated

== Results ==
Home \ Away	AIK	DEG	DJU	GAIS	HBK	HIF	IFE	IFKG	IFKN	ISH	JS	MFF
AIK		4–1	1–1	4–1	4–2	7–1	2–1	1–4	2–5	2–0	2–2	3–2
Degerfors IF	0–1		2–1	0–0	1–3	1–2	1–2	1–1	3–1	1–1	0–1	0–4
Djurgårdens IF	1–3	1–1		1–2	5–0	1–1	2–0	2–2	3–2	0–1	4–0	2–4
GAIS	1–2	1–2	2–1		3–1	3–2	6–2	2–0	1–2	3–3	0–2	2–2
Halmstads BK	1–0	3–4	1–1	2–3		2–2	4–2	1–2	1–4	2–2	3–0	2–2
Hälsingborgs IF	2–1	3–3	4–0	4–2	4–0		6–3	1–0	0–0	1–3	2–2	2–0
IF Elfsborg	0–3	4–1	0–3	2–0	2–4	1–0		1–4	3–1	1–1	5–2	2–2
IFK Göteborg	1–0	0–2	4–1	0–0	6–1	1–3	2–0		1–2	2–1	1–1	0–3
IFK Norrköping	3–1	1–1	2–1	3–2	3–1	4–2	2–2	1–3		3–0	4–0	2–1
IS Halmia	1–1	3–4	1–0	1–1	1–2	5–0	0–5	2–1	1–3		4–3	1–2
Jönköpings Södra	0–4	1–0	2–0	1–1	1–1	2–2	2–2	3–2	1–5	3–1		2–4
Malmö FF	4–3	1–1	0–1	4–0	4–1	5–2	3–0	4–3	2–3	1–1	6–0	

Legend: Blue = home team win; Yellow = draw; Red = away team win.

== Attendances ==
#	Club	Average attendance	Highest attendance
1	AIK	19,184	29,997
2	Djurgårdens IF	15,250	25,876
3	IFK Göteborg	15,235	21,497
4	Malmö FF	15,138	18,091
5	GAIS	12,371	21,663
6	IFK Norrköping	11,387	25,797
7	Hälsingborgs IF	9,651	18,653
8	Jönköpings Södra IF	8,531	13,711
9	IF Elfsborg	7,109	13,538
10	Halmstads BK	6,208	10,017
11	IS Halmia	5,385	9,685
12	Degerfors IF	3,531	7,354
