= 1963 Allsvenskan =

39th season of Allsvenskan

Allsvenskan
- Season: 1963
- Champions: IFK Norrköping
- Relegated: Hammarby IF; IS Halmia
- European Cup: IFK Norrköping
- Top goalscorer: Lars Heineman (Degerfors IF); Bo Larsson (Malmö FF) (17)
- Average attendance: 10,958

Statistics of Allsvenskan in season 1963.

== Overview ==
The league was contested by 12 teams, with IFK Norrköping winning the championship. It started on 15 April and ended on 20 October.

== League table ==
Pos	Team	Pld	W	D	L	GF	GA	GD	Pts	Qualification or relegation
1	IFK Norrköping (C)	22	12	7	3	47	30	+17	31	Qualification to European Cup preliminary round (Note: IFK Norrköping qualified for the European Cup as Allsvenskan leaders in the spring of 1963.)
2	Degerfors IF	22	14	1	7	48	32	+16	29	
3	AIK	22	10	8	4	42	28	+14	28	
4	Malmö FF	22	11	5	6	43	31	+12	27	
5	IFK Göteborg	22	11	4	7	52	31	+21	26	
6	Djurgårdens IF	22	10	6	6	37	34	+3	26	
7	Örgryte IS	22	10	1	11	36	34	+2	21	
8	Örebro SK	22	6	8	8	31	33	−2	20	
9	Hälsingborgs IF	22	7	5	10	33	47	−14	19	
10	IF Elfsborg	22	7	4	11	29	42	−13	18	
11	Hammarby IF (R)	22	5	4	13	43	60	−17	14	Relegation to Division 2
12	IS Halmia (R)	22	1	3	18	28	67	−39	5	Relegation to Division 2

Rules for classification: 1) points; 2) goal difference; 3) number of goals scored.
(C) Champions; (R) Relegated

== Results ==
Home \ Away	AIK	DEG	DJU	HAIF	HÄIF	IFE	IFKG	IFKN	ISH	MFF	ÖSK	ÖIS
AIK		6–1	1–1	4–1	7–1	1–0	0–2	2–2	3–1	1–1	0–0	1–1
Degerfors IF	0–1		0–0	6–4	6–2	3–0	0–1	1–0	5–1	2–1	1–0	0–3
Djurgårdens IF	3–1	3–2		1–1	0–2	2–2	3–5	1–1	1–0	2–0	1–0	3–2
Hammarby IF	1–2	0–1	1–3		2–0	0–2	2–4	2–5	4–3	3–4	1–4	5–2
Hälsingborgs IF	1–2	1–2	1–2	2–2		1–2	2–1	0–0	3–2	1–1	1–1	2–1
IF Elfsborg	2–2	0–1	1–1	4–1	3–1		1–0	0–4	3–2	2–6	2–2	0–3
IFK Göteborg	4–0	3–7	4–1	1–1	2–2	2–0		6–0	1–1	1–2	1–3	0–1
IFK Norrköping	1–1	2–0	2–1	1–1	2–1	4–1	2–1		1–1	2–1	2–3	2–0
IS Halmia	2–4	1–4	2–3	3–6	2–3	1–0	0–5	4–7		0–2	1–2	0–1
Malmö FF	1–0	2–1	2–1	2–3	4–1	1–0	1–1	1–4	6–1		2–2	1–0
Örebro SK	0–0	1–2	3–4	2–0	2–3	1–4	1–4	1–1	0–0	0–0		1–2
Örgryte IS	2–3	0–3	1–0	4–2	1–2	3–0	1–3	1–2	3–0	3–2	1–2	

Legend: Blue = home team win; Yellow = draw; Red = away team win.

== Attendances ==
#	Club	Average	Highest
1	AIK	17,624	38,048
2	Djurgårdens IF	15,812	43,261
3	IFK Göteborg	14,782	30,603
4	Örgryte IS	13,726	31,532
5	IFK Norrköping	12,763	24,068
6	Degerfors IF	10,616	21,065
7	Malmö FF	10,463	15,208
8	IF Elfsborg	10,212	16,602
9	Hammarby IF	8,756	18,758
10	Hälsingborgs IF	7,804	11,180
11	Örebro SK	7,144	15,181
12	IS Halmia	4,950	7,870
