= Lars Heineman =

Swedish footballer (born 1943)

Personal information
- Date of birth: 16 February 1943 (age 83)
- Place of birth: Degerfors, Sweden
- Height: 1.85 m (6 ft 1 in)
- Position: Forward

Senior career*
Years	Team	Apps	(Gls)
1961–1964	Degerfors IF	44	(29)
1965–1967	IF Elfsborg	51	(28)
1968	Detroit Cougars	9	(5)
1968	Washington Whips	12	(9)
1971–1972	IF Karlskoga–Bofors 63		

International career
1963	Sweden	2	(0)
- * Club domestic league appearances and goals

Lars Heineman (16 February 1943) is a Swedish former footballer who played as a forward.
