= 1946–47 Allsvenskan =

23rd season of Allsvenskan

Allsvenskan
- Season: 1946–47
- Champions: IFK Norrköping
- Relegated: Örebro SK; Billingsfors IK
- Top goalscorer: Gunnar Gren, IFK Göteborg (18)
- Average attendance: 9,230

Statistics of Allsvenskan in season 1946/1947.

== Overview ==
The league was contested by 12 teams, with IFK Norrköping winning the championship.

== League table ==
Pos	Team	Pld	W	D	L	GF	GA	GD	Pts	Qualification or relegation
1	IFK Norrköping (C)	22	16	4	2	73	23	+50	36	
2	AIK	22	13	5	4	59	32	+27	31	
3	Malmö FF	22	10	8	4	51	30	+21	28	
4	IF Elfsborg	22	12	2	8	55	42	+13	26	
5	IFK Göteborg	22	9	6	7	52	48	+4	24	
6	Degerfors IF	22	8	6	8	35	33	+2	22	
7	IS Halmia	22	8	6	8	38	43	−5	22	
8	Hälsingborgs IF	22	11	0	11	44	50	−6	22	
9	Djurgårdens IF	22	8	4	10	40	46	−6	20	
10	GAIS	22	5	8	9	30	40	−10	18	
11	Örebro SK (R)	22	5	3	14	40	74	−34	13	Relegation to Division 2
12	Billingsfors (R)	22	0	3	19	28	84	−56	3	Relegation to Division 2

Rules for classification: 1) points; 2) goal difference; 3) number of goals scored.
(C) Champions; (R) Relegated

== Results ==
Home \ Away	AIK	BIK	DEG	DJU	GAIS	HIF	IFE	IFKG	IFKN	ISH	MFF	ÖSK
AIK		6–2	2–1	5–0	0–0	2–0	4–2	4–4	3–3	6–1	2–0	3–1
Billingsfors IK	1–3		1–3	0–2	2–3	3–5	2–2	1–3	0–4	4–6	2–5	3–3
Degerfors IF	2–1	4–1		2–2	0–2	2–1	0–1	2–2	2–1	1–1	1–1	4–1
Djurgårdens IF	0–2	1–1	1–1		2–1	4–1	1–2	4–1	3–6	2–3	2–1	4–2
GAIS	0–3	3–2	0–0	0–1		2–3	1–5	0–0	0–3	0–1	3–3	5–2
Hälsingborgs IF	4–3	1–0	4–1	3–1	0–1		4–3	2–0	1–3	4–2	1–2	3–0
IF Elfsborg	0–2	5–1	3–2	6–3	4–1	4–0		5–1	2–0	2–2	1–2	2–3
IFK Göteborg	1–0	4–0	3–2	3–2	2–2	2–0	2–4		0–3	4–2	0–0	8–2
IFK Norrköping	4–3	3–0	2–0	3–1	1–1	8–1	6–0	4–3		4–0	3–0	5–0
IS Halmia	0–0	6–1	0–1	1–0	1–1	4–2	2–0	2–2	0–0		3–1	0–1
Malmö FF	4–0	6–0	2–1	1–1	2–2	2–1	2–0	6–0	1–1	5–1		3–3
Örebro SK	2–5	6–1	1–3	1–3	3–2	1–3	1–2	1–7	2–6	2–0	2–2	

Legend: Blue = home team win; Yellow = draw; Red = away team win.

== Attendances ==
No.	Club	Average attendance	Highest attendance
1	AIK	19,949	36,226
2	Djurgårdens IF	16,413	21,995
3	Malmö FF	12,729	17,750
4	IFK Göteborg	12,130	18,477
5	IFK Norrköping	9,082	22,066
6	GAIS	8,465	15,086
7	Hälsingborgs IF	7,923	10,913
8	Örebro SK	7,870	11,166
9	IF Elfsborg	5,950	8,763
10	IS Halmia	4,342	6,193
11	Degerfors IF	3,435	7,147
12	Billingsfors IK	2,495	5,340
