= 1944–45 Allsvenskan =

21st season of Allsvenskan

Allsvenskan
- Season: 1944–45
- Champions: IFK Norrköping
- Relegated: Ludvika FFI; Landskrona BoIS
- Top goalscorer: Gunnar Nordahl, IFK Norrköping (27)
- Average attendance: 6,330

Statistics of Allsvenskan in season 1944/1945.

== Overview ==
The league was contested by 12 teams, with IFK Norrköping winning the championship.

== League table ==
| Pos | Team | Pld | W | D | L | GF | GA | GD | Pts | Qualification or relegation |
|---|---|---|---|---|---|---|---|---|---|---|
| 1 | IFK Norrköping (C) | 22 | 17 | 3 | 2 | 71 | 23 | +48 | 37 | |
| 2 | IF Elfsborg | 22 | 13 | 6 | 3 | 52 | 31 | +21 | 32 | |
| 3 | Malmö FF | 22 | 12 | 4 | 6 | 58 | 31 | +27 | 28 | |
| 4 | IFK Göteborg | 22 | 12 | 3 | 7 | 57 | 43 | +14 | 27 | |
| 5 | Degerfors IF | 22 | 10 | 5 | 7 | 35 | 32 | +3 | 25 | |
| 6 | GAIS | 22 | 9 | 3 | 10 | 35 | 38 | −3 | 21 | |
| 7 | AIK | 22 | 7 | 5 | 10 | 38 | 38 | 0 | 19 | |
| 8 | Halmstads BK | 22 | 8 | 2 | 12 | 33 | 58 | −25 | 18 | |
| 9 | IS Halmia | 22 | 7 | 2 | 13 | 31 | 49 | −18 | 16 | |
| 10 | Hälsingborgs IF | 22 | 5 | 4 | 13 | 35 | 56 | −21 | 14 | |
| 11 | Ludvika (R) | 22 | 6 | 2 | 14 | 30 | 56 | −26 | 14 | Relegation to Division 2 |
| 12 | Landskrona BoIS (R) | 22 | 4 | 5 | 13 | 38 | 58 | −20 | 13 | Relegation to Division 2 |

Rules for classification: 1) points; 2) goal difference; 3) number of goals scored.
(C) Champions; (R) Relegated

== Results ==
| Home \ Away | AIK | DIF | GAIS | HBK | HIF | IFE | IFKG | IFKN | ISH | BOIS | LFFI | MFF |
|---|---|---|---|---|---|---|---|---|---|---|---|---|
| AIK | | 0–2 | 4–2 | 4–0 | 6–1 | 1–3 | 2–7 | 4–1 | 1–1 | 2–2 | 3–1 | 1–2 |
| Degerfors IF | 0–0 | | 1–0 | 5–0 | 1–1 | 1–1 | 2–1 | 0–1 | 2–1 | 1–1 | 2–0 | 0–4 |
| GAIS | 3–1 | 1–1 | | 4–0 | 1–1 | 0–2 | 1–0 | 2–4 | 3–1 | 4–2 | 2–0 | 1–4 |
| Halmstads BK | 2–1 | 1–2 | 4–1 | | 1–0 | 0–4 | 1–1 | 0–3 | 1–2 | 4–2 | 3–2 | 1–1 |
| Hälsingborgs IF | 1–0 | 2–4 | 0–1 | 1–2 | | 2–3 | 4–2 | 2–2 | 0–3 | 2–3 | 4–2 | 2–5 |
| IF Elfsborg | 3–2 | 0–2 | 2–1 | 4–0 | 1–0 | | 3–3 | 2–2 | 1–2 | 6–4 | 6–0 | 1–1 |
| IFK Göteborg | 2–0 | 2–1 | 2–0 | 6–1 | 6–1 | 1–1 | | 1–6 | 5–0 | 3–0 | 5–0 | 0–6 |
| IFK Norrköping | 0–0 | 2–0 | 3–0 | 5–1 | 4–5 | 5–1 | 5–1 | | 1–0 | 9–1 | 3–0 | 3–0 |
| IS Halmia | 1–0 | 4–3 | 2–0 | 2–4 | 1–3 | 0–1 | 1–3 | 1–4 | | 3–1 | 1–2 | 2–2 |
| Landskrona BoIS | 1–1 | 5–1 | 1–3 | 3–0 | 1–1 | 1–1 | 1–2 | 1–3 | 5–2 | | 1–2 | 2–3 |
| Ludvika FFI | 1–2 | 1–3 | 2–2 | 2–5 | 5–2 | 1–3 | 3–4 | 0–2 | 2–1 | 1–0 | | 2–1 |
| Malmö FF | 2–3 | 4–1 | 1–3 | 3–2 | 2–0 | 2–3 | 4–0 | 1–3 | 5–0 | 4–0 | 1–1 | |

Legend: Blue = home team win; Yellow = draw; Red = away team win.

== Attendances ==
| # | Club | Average | Highest |
|---|---|---|---|
| 1 | IFK Göteborg | 11,322 | 23,778 |
| 2 | Malmö FF | 11,226 | 15,459 |
| 3 | AIK | 10,688 | 16,813 |
| 4 | Hälsingborgs IF | 6,994 | 10,990 |
| 5 | IFK Norrköping | 6,768 | 14,970 |
| 6 | IF Elfsborg | 6,020 | 10,289 |
| 7 | GAIS | 5,572 | 8,659 |
| 8 | Halmstads BK | 4,588 | 7,968 |
| 9 | IS Halmia | 3,735 | 6,277 |
| 10 | Landskrona BoIS | 3,562 | 6,378 |
| 11 | Ludvika FK | 3,451 | 6,226 |
| 12 | Degerfors IF | 2,032 | 3,248 |
