= Matti Mäkelä =

Finnish footballer (born 1939)

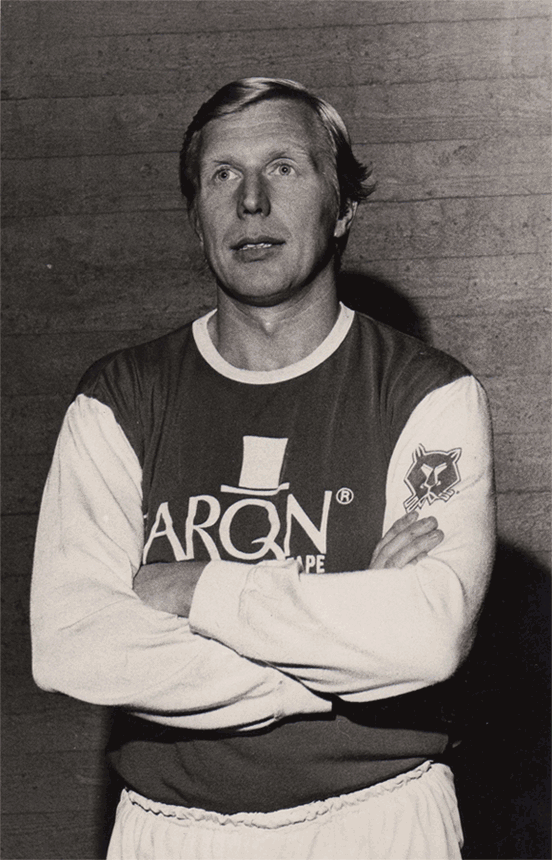
- Mäkelä in 1972

Personal information
- Date of birth: 14 January 1939 (age 87)
- Place of birth: Tampere, Finland
- Position: Midfielder

International career
Years	Team	Apps	(Gls)
1961–1970	Finland	29	(2)

Matti Mäkelä (born 14 January 1939) is a Finnish former footballer who played as a midfielder. He made 29 appearances for the Finland national team from 1961 to 1970.
