= 1945–46 Allsvenskan =

22nd season of Allsvenskan

Allsvenskan
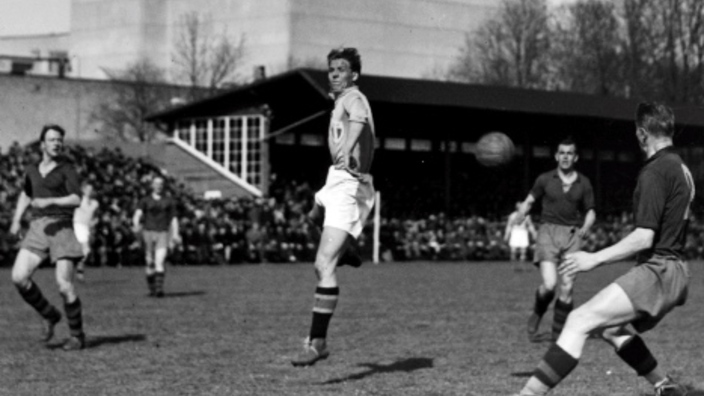
- Season: 1945–46
- Champions: IFK Norrköping
- Relegated: Jönköpings Södra IF; Halmstads BK
- Top goalscorer: Gunnar Nordahl, IFK Norrköping (25)
- Average attendance: 8,619

Statistics of Allsvenskan in season 1945/1946.

== Overview ==
The league was contested by 12 teams, with IFK Norrköping winning the championship.

== League table ==
| Pos | Team | Pld | W | D | L | GF | GA | GD | Pts | Qualification or relegation |
|---|---|---|---|---|---|---|---|---|---|---|
| 1 | IFK Norrköping (C) | 22 | 16 | 3 | 3 | 67 | 22 | +45 | 35 | |
| 2 | Malmö FF | 22 | 13 | 4 | 5 | 48 | 27 | +21 | 30 | |
| 3 | IFK Göteborg | 22 | 12 | 6 | 4 | 48 | 29 | +19 | 30 | |
| 4 | GAIS | 22 | 11 | 6 | 5 | 36 | 28 | +8 | 28 | |
| 5 | Degerfors IF | 22 | 9 | 5 | 8 | 31 | 23 | +8 | 23 | |
| 6 | AIK | 22 | 8 | 6 | 8 | 44 | 45 | −1 | 22 | |
| 7 | IF Elfsborg | 22 | 7 | 6 | 9 | 43 | 44 | −1 | 20 | |
| 8 | Hälsingborgs IF | 22 | 6 | 6 | 10 | 45 | 57 | −12 | 18 | |
| 9 | IS Halmia | 22 | 5 | 7 | 10 | 40 | 49 | −9 | 17 | |
| 10 | Djurgårdens IF | 22 | 7 | 2 | 13 | 42 | 64 | −22 | 16 | |
| 11 | Jönköpings Södra IF (R) | 22 | 6 | 3 | 13 | 31 | 60 | −29 | 15 | Relegation to Division 2 |
| 12 | Halmstads BK (R) | 22 | 3 | 4 | 15 | 24 | 51 | −27 | 10 | Relegation to Division 2 |

Rules for classification: 1) points; 2) goal difference; 3) number of goals scored.
(C) Champions; (R) Relegated

== Results ==
| Home \ Away | AIK | DEG | DJU | GAIS | HBK | HIF | IFE | IFKG | IFKN | ISH | JS | MFF |
|---|---|---|---|---|---|---|---|---|---|---|---|---|
| AIK | | 0–2 | 3–1 | 1–1 | 0–2 | 3–4 | 4–2 | 3–1 | 1–4 | 6–3 | 1–2 | 1–4 |
| Degerfors IF | 0–0 | | 4–2 | 0–0 | 3–0 | 2–0 | 2–3 | 0–1 | 2–3 | 0–4 | 3–0 | 0–1 |
| Djurgårdens IF | 1–3 | 2–1 | | 2–3 | 2–0 | 5–4 | 0–3 | 3–0 | 1–2 | 0–4 | 4–2 | 2–2 |
| GAIS | 2–2 | 0–2 | 2–1 | | 3–2 | 2–0 | 5–3 | 1–3 | 1–4 | 3–1 | 3–0 | 0–1 |
| Halmstads BK | 0–2 | 0–3 | 3–3 | 0–2 | | 2–1 | 1–3 | 2–4 | 0–1 | 1–1 | 2–2 | 1–3 |
| Hälsingborgs IF | 3–3 | 1–3 | 2–5 | 2–0 | 1–1 | | 3–3 | 2–1 | 2–1 | 3–3 | 5–0 | 0–2 |
| IF Elfsborg | 0–1 | 1–1 | 2–1 | 1–1 | 5–1 | 4–4 | | 1–2 | 2–0 | 2–2 | 1–1 | 1–3 |
| IFK Göteborg | 1–1 | 1–1 | 3–1 | 1–3 | 3–2 | 2–2 | 3–1 | | 2–0 | 3–2 | 7–0 | 3–1 |
| IFK Norrköping | 3–1 | 2–0 | 11–1 | 0–0 | 3–1 | 6–2 | 3–0 | 0–0 | | 3–2 | 6–2 | 5–0 |
| IS Halmia | 3–3 | 0–1 | 1–3 | 0–0 | 4–2 | 1–2 | 2–1 | 2–2 | 0–3 | | 1–1 | 1–7 |
| Jönköpings Södra | 5–2 | 1–0 | 3–1 | 2–3 | 2–0 | 4–1 | 0–2 | 0–4 | 1–6 | 2–3 | | 0–1 |
| Malmö FF | 1–3 | 1–1 | 6–1 | 0–1 | 0–1 | 4–1 | 4–2 | 1–1 | 1–1 | 1–0 | 4–1 | |

Legend: Blue = home team win; Yellow = draw; Red = away team win.

== Attendances ==
| # | Club | Average | Highest |
|---|---|---|---|
| 1 | AIK | 15,376 | 28,838 |
| 2 | IFK Göteborg | 13,673 | 19,787 |
| 3 | Djurgårdens IF | 13,253 | 22,191 |
| 4 | Malmö FF | 11,879 | 16,302 |
| 5 | GAIS | 8,439 | 22,354 |
| 6 | Jönköpings Södra IF | 8,208 | 10,946 |
| 7 | Hälsingborgs IF | 8,013 | 12,593 |
| 8 | IFK Norrköping | 7,594 | 15,289 |
| 9 | IF Elfsborg | 5,488 | 9,010 |
| 10 | Halmstads BK | 4,253 | 6,641 |
| 11 | IS Halmia | 3,928 | 4,799 |
| 12 | Degerfors IF | 3,344 | 6,817 |
