= Axel Berg (footballer) =

Norwegian footballer (1938–2020)

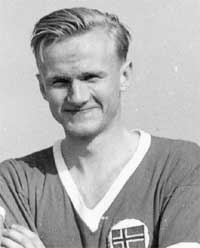
- Berg in 1960

Personal information
- Full name: Axel August Berg
- Date of birth: 8 July 1938
- Place of birth: Oslo, Norway
- Date of death: 12 April 2020 (aged 81)
- Place of death: Bærum, Norway
- Position: Winger

Youth career
- 1948–1955: Lyn

Senior career*
Years	Team	Apps	(Gls)
1955–1965	Lyn		

International career
1956	Norway u-19	1	(1)
1959–1960	Norway u-21	2	(1)
1960–1962	Norway B	2	(0)
1959–1961	Norway	8	(2)
- * Club domestic league appearances and goals

Axel August Berg (8 July 1938 – 12 April 2020) was a Norwegian football winger.

He played for Lyn between 1955 and 1965 and represented Norway as a youth, under-21 and senior international.

He grew up at Majorstua. A one-club man, he remained in the Lyn milieu his entire life. He died in April 2020.
