= Scudetto of the Pistols =

Incident that happened in the 1924-25 Prima Divisione

The journalistic expression ‘Scudetto of the Pistols’ refers to the title of ‘champion of Italy’ conquered by Bologna in the 1924-1925 First Division, the 25th edition of the top level of the Italian men's football championship, as well as, in the broad sense, to the entire season and the numerous controversies that determined its outcome.

The competition, won by Bologna in the national final against Alba Roma, was in fact characterised by a series of disputes involving sporting decisions, political influences, and judicial rulings, that took place during the final of the Northern League (the section of the championship reserved for teams from northern Italy) between Bologna and reigning champions Genoa; this series, lasting five matches, included refereeing disputes, institutional disagreements, and incidents of violence, leading to the nickname ‘Scudetto of the Pistols’.

Genoa disputed the tournament results, citing concerns over fairness and legitimacy, while Bologna always defended its validity.

== Background ==
=== The 1923-1924 championship ===
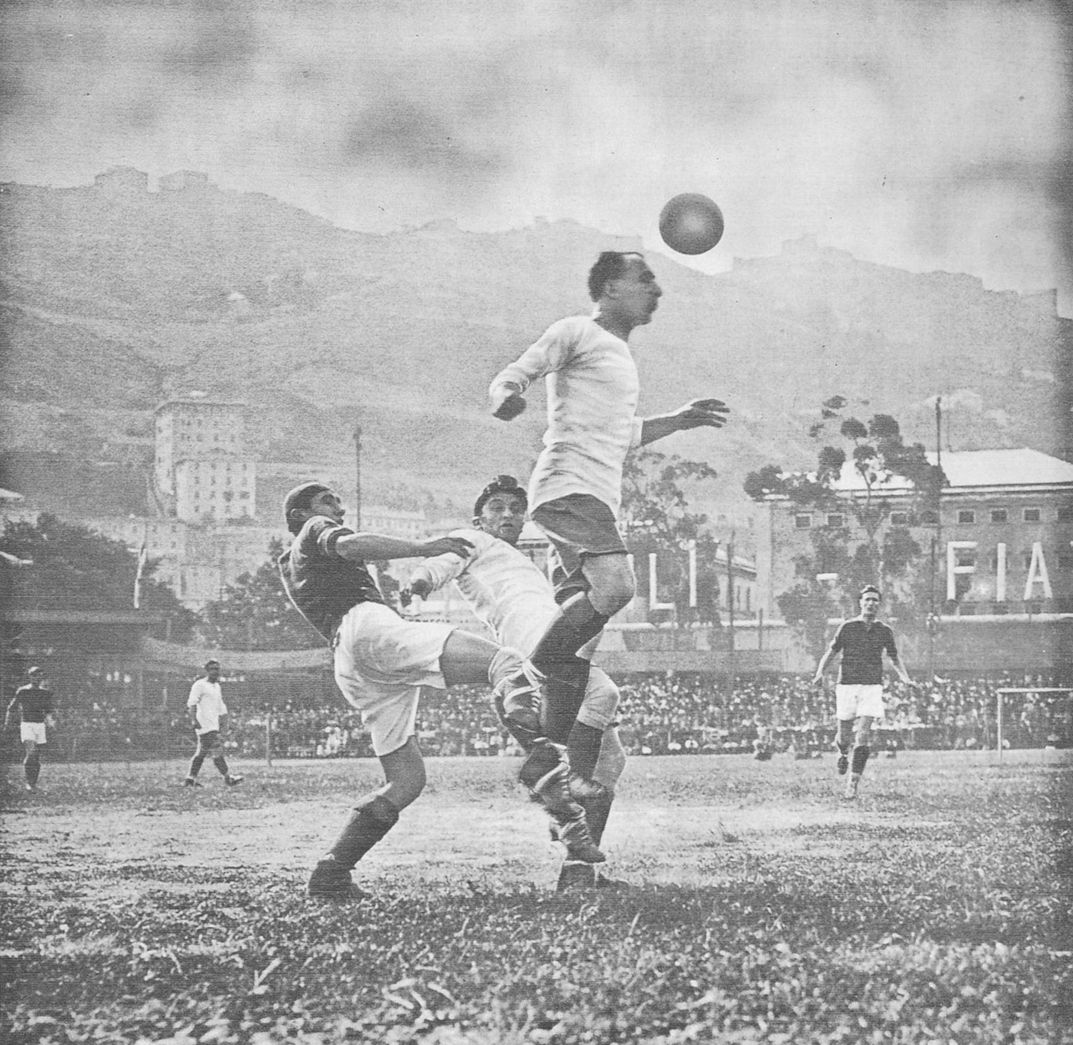
Genoa captain Renzo De Vecchi heads past team-mate Luigi Burlando and Bologna's Angelo Schiavio at Marassi in the first leg of the 1923-1924 Lega Nord final.

The beginnings of the clash in 1925 between Genoa and Bologna that went down in history as the Scudetto of the Pistols developed during the previous championship, the 1923-1924 First Division.

The two red and blue teams faced each other for the final of the Northern League on 15 June and 22 June 1924, after having reached it in a dramatic manner. In Group A, Genoa indirectly benefited from the Rosetta case, a scandal linked to the transfer of full-back Virginio Rosetta from Pro Vercelli to Juventus: after a long tug-of-war with the Federazione Italiana Giuoco Calcio, the League managed to prevent the official recognition of Rosetta's transfer to Edoardo Agnelli's team, and the Bianconeri's title race was compromised by three games lost for having irregularly fielded the defender. In Group B, however, Bologna overcame Torino by a single point following a defeat suffered by the granata on the field of Spezia, marked by controversy over the unsportsmanlike behaviour of the home crowd; the ‘Toro’ appealed for an automatic victory, but the request was rejected and the score on the field validated.

The first leg match of the final, held in Genoa, was marked by several brawls that broke out in the stands; some spectators even invaded the pitch: among them Giovanni Battista Traverso, a former Genoese footballer and coach of Cremonese, who punched Giuseppe Della Valle, the Bologna captain. The match was decided in favour of the hosts only at the end, with a goal from Ettore Neri, despite the sporting chronicles recognising Bologna's supremacy in the game. Bologna later lodged a complaint against the homologation of the result, which was rejected by the Northern League board on 22 June; Genoa were fined 1,000 lira for the fans' invasion of the pitch, while Traverso was disqualified for four months.

The return match took place in Emilia a week later, on the Sterlino pitch hit by relentless rain. Bologna, as in the first leg, maintained the clear dominance of the match, but Genoa responded promptly on the pitch in the first half, with a counter-attack goal by Santamaria; the scoreline angered the Bologna public. In the first quarter of the second half Bologna managed to equalize with a penalty converted by Pozzi, and in the next thirty minutes the match dragged on convulsively, ravaged by both the downpour and the turbulent behaviour of the fans, to the point that the referee Panzeri from Milan completely lost control of the situation (a chronicle of the next day described him as ‘shipwrecked in a storm’). The match was suspended a few minutes from the end, after some Bologna supporters had attempted another pitch invasion, climbing over the fencing nets: at the beginning the referee justified the decision on the basis of the impracticability of the field due to bad weather conditions, but then confided to reporters that he had taken such a measure because of the intemperance of the home fans, and to have awarded the penalty for the draw only after heavy pressure (in the match report, he explained verbatim that he had ‘purposely granted the penalty kick to Bologna to avoid incidents on the field and in the stands’).

The Lega Nord did not homologate the result (also following Genoa's complaint) and reserved its decision after having questioned the referee. The Lega Council, noting a different and contradictory version in Panzeri's report, in particular ‘on a point of serious technical importance’, gave the Lega presidency, in conjunction with the technical commission, the mandate to further investigate the course of the Bologna match. The affair ended with the Lega Nord council meeting of 16 July, in which Panzeri provided the requested clarifications and Article 15 was applied against Bologna, with the consequent awarding of a 0–2 victory to Genoa due to ‘serious public intemperance’. The Bologna press criticized the League's handling of the finals, alleging inconsistencies in the application of rules.

The ‘Grifone’, having thus obtained the title of Northern League champions, faced Savoia of Torre Annunziata in the final in September, after a long wait due to the protracted southern championship. The Campanians put in an excellent performance, becoming the first team from the Southern League to snatch a draw from a northern side; despite this, Genoa prevailed in the two-legged clash (3–1 home win, 1–1 away draw) and won their ninth Italian league title. Savoia complained about an alleged ghost goal scored by Ligurian Daniele Moruzzi in the return match.

=== The 1924-1925 northern group stage ===
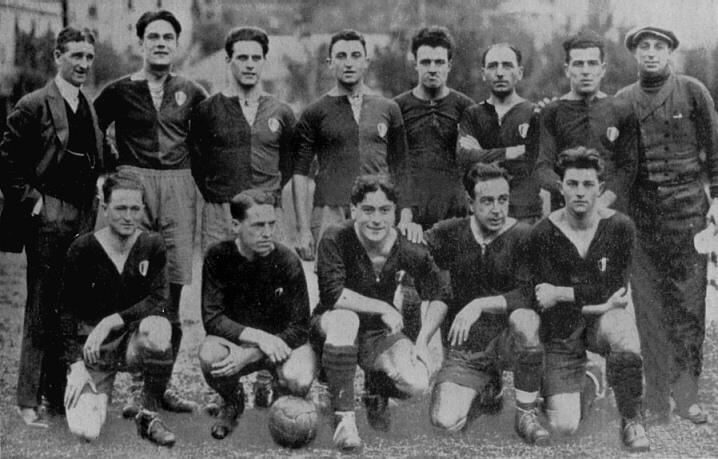
Genoa's players, defending champions, were the first to be able to boast a newly created badge on their shirts: the tricolour scudetto.

During the first phase of the 1924-1925 First Division championship, the progress of Genoa, the defending champions with the scudetto on their chests, was mixed. It was Modena who took advantage of this, leading the Northern League Group A for long stretches: with two rounds to go, the Emilians were two points ahead of Casale and four ahead of Genoa; the ‘Grifone’, however, had to play two more matches that had been postponed. Two victories would, therefore, have guaranteed the Gialloblù victory in the round or the play-off with the Rossoblù for first place in the event of a tie. On the penultimate day, however, the Emilians collapsed in an away match against Brescia, who were fighting not to be relegated, and the Genoese, who also benefited from the postponement of the last match, overtook them in the standings by a single point, grabbing the qualification to the League final in extremis, thanks to two wins and a draw in the three replay matches against teams that had nothing to play for in the championship (although, according to the chronicles, they fought hard).

According to the Modenese, the reasons that allowed Genoa to postpone the three matches were highly questionable. The match against Pisa on 29 March was postponed by the decision of the referee Trezzi, motivated by the impracticability of the ground due to the torrential rain that had fallen during the morning, although the two teams (who at that time were paired at the top with 23 points) still played a friendly match (won by Genoa 2–1) for the paying public; the match of 5 April against Torino was postponed by order of the Northern League so that Genoa could play a friendly against Nacional of Montevideo; the match of 26 April (last day) against Spezia was postponed for reasons of public order by prefectural order, for alleged security concerns related to the presence of Modena supporters who had come to check the regularity of the match, with the consequent danger of incidents.

In group B, the protagonists were Bologna, Pro Vercelli and Juventus. In particular, the duel between the Rossoblù and the Bianconeri was marked by mutual overtaking at the top of the standings. Juventus managed to take the lead by beating their rivals in Turin, but were overtaken at the end of the first leg and then overtaken again when the Emilians took revenge in Bologna. Finally, the Bianconeri missed their last chance for a breakthrough when, five days from the end, they were unable to take advantage of the defeat suffered by Bologna in Alessandria, losing to the third-placed opponents from Vercelli.

== The ‘’five finals‘’ ==
=== The first two matches ===
Genoa and Bologna faced each other again for the Lega Nord final a year after the previous confrontation, marked by fan intemperance, in which the Ligurians had prevailed, winning one-nil at home in the first leg and two-nil in the return match away. The experienced Ligurians, led on the bench by Englishman William Garbutt (who went down in history for being the first professional coach in Italy), were considered favourites by the press; the Emilians, however, had a very strong attack made up of Bernardo Perin, Angelo Schiavio and captain Giuseppe Della Valle, and were coached by Austrian Hermann Felsner, a proponent of the dictates of the ‘’beautiful game‘’ theorised by the Danubian school of football.

The two teams faced each other for the first of two matches at Bologna's Sterlino Stadium, on 24 May 1925: Genoa took the lead in the second half thanks to goals first from Cesare Alberti and then from Edoardo Catto, while at the end Schiavio scored the consolation goal for Bologna. The following week, in the Marassi Stadium, Bologna took the lead in the first half with a goal from Giuseppe Muzzioli on an assist from Schiavio; in the following half Emilio Santamaria brought the game to a draw, but Genoa, instead of settling for a draw, continued to throw themselves into the attack in search of victory and found themselves exposed, conceding a goal from Della Valle with seven minutes to go. After the match there were public order problems and an attempted aggression by the Genoa fans towards referee Achille Gama, who was rescued by the Carabinieri, the field commissioner and some of the ‘Grifone’ managers.

24 May 1925

Bologna	1–2	Genoa
Schiavio 89'		57' Alberti; 86' Catto

Stadio Sterlino, Bologna
Referee: A. Gama (Milan)
31 May 1925

Genoa	1–2	Bologna
Santamaria 73'		34' Muzzioli; 83' Della Valle

Stadio Luigi Ferraris, Genoa
Referee: A. Gama (Milan)

=== The non-homologated one-game playoff ===
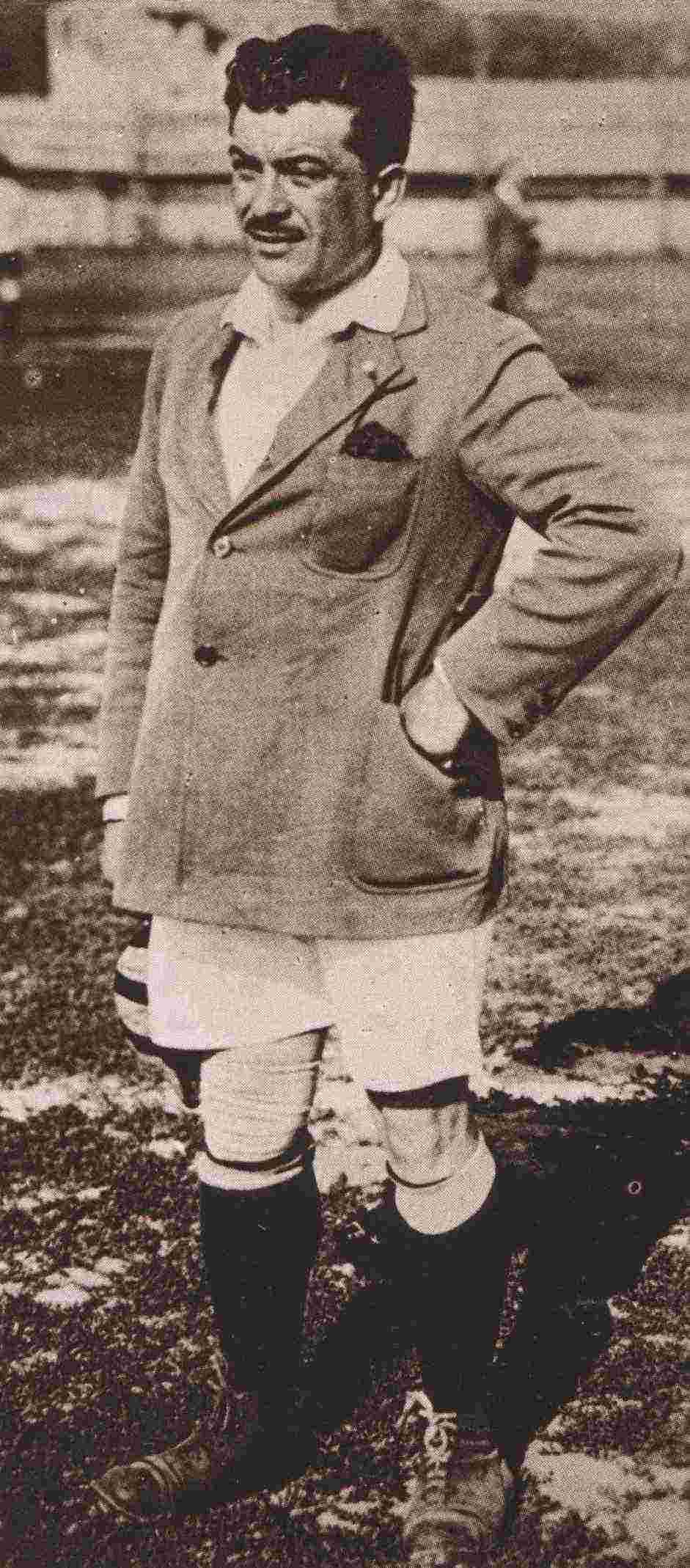
Giovanni Mauro, referee of the first playoff.

A playoff was therefore necessary, set for the following Sunday, 7 June, in Milan. The flow of supporters who flocked to the Lombard capital by trains and special coaches organised by the clubs was so great that it completely filled the stadium where AC Milan were playing, with the crowds thronging to the edge of the pitch. Referee Giovanni Mauro told Enrico Olivetti, president of Lega Nord as well as Inter, that he did not consider the playing conditions regular, and only the latter's insistence persuaded him to start the match. According to the Genoese journalist Renzo Bidone, Mauro had announced his intention to suspend the match if two hundred policemen had not arrived within fifteen minutes of the kick-off whistle, guaranteed to him by the match officials; the alleged pact between the match director and the organisers is not mentioned by other sources, however, and the match continued anyway after the first quarter of an hour despite the arrival of the aforementioned officers not having taken place. In any case, Mauro formally rejected responsibility on Olivetti for what might have happened, even though the two clubs were not informed of the arrangements made.

Genoa took a double lead with Daniele Moruzzi and Alberti and the enthusiastic Ligurian fans invaded the ground several times; nevertheless, the match continued without incident until the sixteenth minute of the second half, when a shot by Bologna's Muzzioli entered the goal defended by Giovanni De Prà in an apparently anomalous way: the referee, in fact, did not award the goal to Bologna, but rather a corner, believing that the ball had actually left the playing area, deflected by the Genoese goalkeeper. The press statements of the time and the posthumous accounts of the protagonists do not clarify what actually happened: part of the reporters agreed that the goal seemed blatant to many spectators and that Mauro could not have perfectly followed the dynamics of Bologna's attack as he was far from the penalty area, while other newspapers defended the action arguing that the fans gathered at the sides of the pitch had probably compromised the regularity of the action, allowing Muzzioli to keep the ball in play while he was in face-to-face with De Prà (Mauro himself explained that he had not seen the ball enter the goal and spoke of ‘inexplicable bounces’); bystanders, moreover, made the situation more confusing by obstructing the journalists' view and moving the ball away after the referee's intervention. Even the opinion of the linesmen Trezzi and Ferro is not completely clear: the majority of sources reported that they were inclined to concede the goal to Bologna, with the sole but relevant exception of the authoritative magazine Guerin Sportivo, which claimed that they were instead in favour of Mauro's decision.

Mauro's decision led to significant unrest among fans, including interruptions and protests during the match: numerous supporters of the ‘Veltri’ entered the field encircling the referee and threateningly demanding the granting of the goal. The impasse lasted about fifteen minutes: Mauro, after having tried to interrupt the match by fleeing, renounced his intention after an attempt of violence by a spectator and by request of an unspecified FIGC executive, to whom he reiterated his opinion about the irregularity of the match; finally, after consulting with the linesmen, he decided to go on with the match and to award the goal, even if he did not consider it valid, in order to appease the Emilian supporters. The match resumed and, eight minutes from the end, Bologna equalized with Pozzi: the Genoans protested for some alleged restraints during the action, which were not, however, detected by any reporters of the match. The match continued, interspersed with further pitch invasions, and the Bologna side also scored the 3-2 goal with Della Valle, which was cancelled due to a charge by the Bologna captain on De Prà. Finally, after 112 minutes of play, regulation time ended in a draw.

The alleged interference of Leandro Arpinati

The identity of the FIGC representative who spoke to Mauro during the suspension of the game, convincing him not to interrupt the playoff, is a mystery.

Some pro-Fascist speculation identifies him as the Fascist politician from Romagna Leandro Arpinati, to whom they attribute the position of federal vice-president, and accuse him, as a well-known Bologna supporter, of having exercised sectarian interference in the referee's subsequent decisions; again according to these Ligurian sources, among the people who besieged Mauro there would have been a group of black shirts, unleashed precisely by Arpinati with the aim of forcing the match director to award Muzzioli's goal.

Both allegations, however, are without foundation. The assertion about Arpinati's position is erroneous, as in 1925 he did not hold the role of vice-president, nor did he hold any other position in the FIGC; moreover, the Emilian testimonies confirm Arpinati's presence in the stands, but at the same time deny his descent onto the field of play. Even the account of the aggression suffered by Mauro by pro-Bolognese comrades is not corroborated by the chronicles; La Stampa of Turin, on the contrary, claimed that two National Security militiamen had gone to the referee to protect him from intimidation by the public.

The most plausible hypotheses, therefore, are that the mistaken identification of the executive as Arpinati derives from the fact that he was in that year at the vice-presidency of the Federazione Italiana Sports Atletici (FISA), later to become the Federazione Italiana di Atletica Leggera (FIDAL), and that the official who went to talk to Mauro was none other than the aforementioned head of the Lega Olivetti, who had already intervened before the start of the match.

At that point, however, Genoa refused to play extra time, forcing Mauro to prematurely whistle the end of the match: according to the directors of the ‘Grifone’, Mauro had confirmed to them that he considered the first goal to be irregular, and the Ligurians replied that, as the nullity of the goal was established, they considered themselves winners, therefore the dispute of extra time was unnecessary and liable to ‘equivocal interpretations’. According to De Prà's posthumous testimony, when Bologna's first goal was validated Mauro would have explicitly assured Genoa captain Renzo De Vecchi that the match was to be considered over at that moment at 2–0 in favour of the reigning champions, and that the continuation would simply be pro forma; other Genoa players made similar unofficial statements to the press as they were about to leave Milan, yet official Genoa communications and the account written by De Vecchi years later for the weekly Il Calcio Illustrato rule out the existence of a guarantee given by the referee. After the match, there was also a brawl between the opposing fans at Milano Centrale station.

In the following two weeks the result of the match remained sub iudice, while both Genoa and Bologna appealed for a forfeit victory: the Ligurians by virtue of the forced award of Muzzioli's goal; the Emilians by reason of the failure to play extra time (according to the argument of the Bologna team, the rivals, by forfeiting, had automatically lost any right to complain). The dispute, however, was resolved with a controversial solution. Giovanni Mauro, in fact, had reported the ruling on public order notified to the Federation on the occasion of the match, and resubmitted it during the Lega Nord Council meeting held on 20–21 June. Having taken note of the statement provided by Mauro, and although commenting negatively on the referee's actions, the League decided not to homologate the match, rejected both the Genoese and the Bolognese complaints and decreed that the playoff should be repeated; the Federal Council of 27 June confirmed the previous deliberations and in addition fined the reigning champions for not having continued the match in extra time.

Interviewed by the Guerin Sportivo on 26 June, Mauro explained again that he had invalidated any outcome of the playoff ab initio, but the annulment sentence and the version of facts sustained by the referee from Domodossola were contested by the press, along the lines of the criticism expressed in the Lega's communiqué. In particular, Il Paese Sportivo of Turin and La Gazzetta dello Sport of Milan argued that, although Mauro had claimed that the match was totally irregular, the direction of the match itself had begun in strict accordance with the rules, since the referee had not communicated to the teams his intention to invalidate it, and the sporting legislation in force did not provide for the possibility of annulling a match on the basis of a ruling applied retroactively; it followed that, in accordance with the rules, the match should not have been disallowed and the League should have ruled in favour of one of the teams. According to the retrospective of Giancarlo Rizzoglio, historian of the Genoa Foundation, Mauro would have put the accent on the original problem of the game's atmosphere, and ultimately on the organisational responsibility of the League, rather than on the subsequent events of the field, for the presumable reason that, as an article of the ‘Guerino’ of 18 June would show, he was one of the candidates to assume the presidency of the League; at the same time, the departing president Olivetti is said to have disavowed the match report by claiming that the first half of the match was regular. However, the Guerin Sportivo in those years was famous for being particularly critical of Mauro, so it may not be fully reliable.

7 June 1925

Genoa	2–2 (canceled)	Bologna
Catto 12'; Alberti 43'		61' Muzzioli; 82' Pozzi

Viale Lombardia, Milan
Referee: Giovanni Mauro (Milan)

=== The shootout in Turin ===
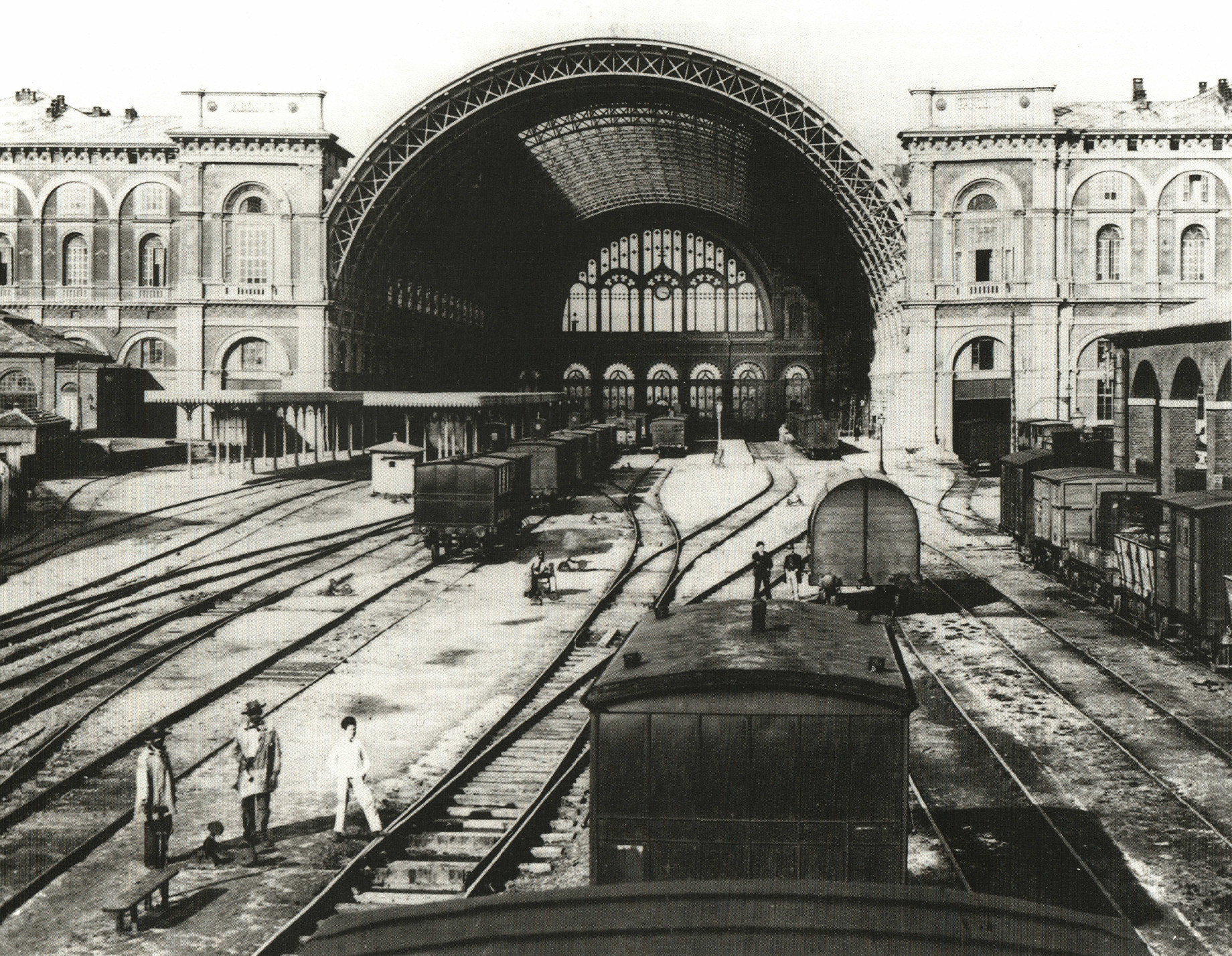
The Torino Porta Nuova station, theatre of the clash between the two red and blue groups of supporters that earned this championship the nickname of the Scudetto of the Pistols.

On 5 July, the second playoff took place in Turin, in the Corso Marsiglia stadium of Juventus (initially the chosen venue was the Villa Chayes ground in Livorno, later rejected due to insufficient capacity). In the capital of Piedmont, in a practically militarized stadium, it was Bologna who immediately took the lead with Schiavio, but Genoa managed to equalise with Catto: the match ended 1–1 after extra time. There was, however, a serious crime incident at the Porta Nuova station, when the two special trains run by the clubs and taking their respective fans home met: during the ensuing clash, around 20 revolver shots were fired from the Bologna convoy at the Genoa fans, causing two injuries.

While a confrontation broke out between the two clubs to the tune of reciprocal insults in official communiqués, on 11 July, a joint meeting was held between the League and the Federation: the FIGC, after expressing solidarity with Genoa and inviting Bologna to identify the perpetrators of the attack as soon as possible, decided that yet another match would be played on 19 July in Turin, but behind closed doors. The situation, however, became even more complicated, since Agostino D'Adamo, prefect of the province of Turin, did not give his consent to host the match and Bologna's board of directors opposed the federal stance, presenting an agenda in which they complained about alleged instigation by the Genoese on the occasion of the misdeed of Porta Nuova. Consequently, on 18 July, the Federation decided to postpone the new match to a date to be decided, fined Bologna for its insubordination and ordered it to hand over those responsible for the shooting to the authorities by 31 July, under penalty of the application of Article 22 of its Statute, which would have led to the disqualification of the team (as well as a possible suspension) and granted Genoa access to the final.

Bologna and the public opinion close to it, however, rebelled against this measure, denouncing a hypothetical plot hatched against the Felsinei: the Bologna periodical La Voce Sportiva pointed out that of the seven representatives of the federal directorate, which had threatened the club's ouster from the final, four were from Piedmont, three from Liguria and none from Emilia; Bologna's secretary Enrico Sabattini, moreover, declared that the FIGC communiqué recording the minutes of the assembly of 11 July had an untruthful content, designed both to conceal the discussion regarding the provocations of the Genoa fans prior to the shootout in Turin, and to cast a shadow over the firm condemnation of the Petronian club towards the behaviour of its supporters.

For these reasons, on July 20, the Bologna-based association launched an angry protest at Piazza del Nettuno in the Emilia capital with the support of local political authorities. On that occasion, the members' assembly reiterated its belief in the existence of a conspiracy to favor Genoa: the charges laid out were the failure to disqualify Genoa for forfeiting in extra time in Milan, the choice of Turin as the venue for the rematch (which they considered to be non-neutral and favorable to Genoa), and the 15-day wait for the match to be played (which they said was aimed at allowing the reigning champions to recover their strength); the Turin newspaper Il Paese Sportivo stigmatized the Bologna controversy in substance and method, calling it an “exceptional fabrication” as well as describing the statements uttered as “insulting” and the tone used as “clearly offensive.” The conclusion of the session was entrusted to city councilor Galliano, who launched a scathing attack on the FIGC leadership:

The citizens of Bologna gathered in an impressive public rally; having taken note of the disgusting abuse that the leaders of the Italian Football Federation want to perpetrate against Bologna F.C., only guilty of having exercised and wanting to exercise the elementary and irrepressible right of defense against accusations that are completely unfounded and for responsibilities that absolutely do not exist:

- Declares all its sympathy and solidarity with Bologna F.C. in the holy battle to which it has been dragged by the federal bodies, which, after repeated evidence of gross insipience, obvious partisanship and even mendacity, would now tend to make up for lost authority by resorting to intimidation and terror and by deliberately sacrificing one of the federal clubs that most honors Italian football and is the pride and decency of the city of Bologna;

and in the belief that the offense, in addition to the sports club, concerns the entire citizenry:

- Calls on Bologna F.C. not to give in to the Federation's insane ultimatum, promising not to stop the agitation that began today until the manipulators of the crudest sports parliamentarianism, in short, all those who have proven unworthy of holding the destiny of the great and flourishing national football family, are swept away "as disturbers of the public peace".

— Lawyer Galliano, July 20, 1925, speech transcribed in Prefect Bocchini's report of July 21, 1925.

This fiery rally was followed by the intervention of Bologna prefect Arturo Bocchini, who, in a statement directed to the Ministry of the Interior, benevolently described the protests as “platonic and enthusiastic” but expressed fear that the federal decision would engender “consequences [...] on public order in other cities on which the Bologna team by virtue of the Federation's deliberation could be deemed excluded from sports competitions.”

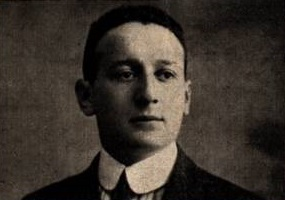
Umberto Malvano, proponent of the July 26, 1925 agreement between Genoa and Bologna.

A general meeting of the Northern League, whose leadership (Olivetti at the head) had in the meantime resigned en bloc because of scandals, was then called in Parma on July 26. During the meeting, through the mediation of Juventus executive Umberto Malvano, Bologna member Sabattini and Genoa representative Lawyer Bianchi agreed on settling the issue of superiority between the two teams on the pitch. Malvano's agenda, which was approved, asked the Federation to suspend sine die the sanctions against the Emilians and to schedule, regardless of the investigation into the Turin incident, the holding of a third playoff match, the fifth overall. On the same day, Lawyer Giuseppe Cavazzana was elected as president of the Northern League, a figure estranged from past deliberations, while Silvio Marengo, a former Genoese footballer as well as a member and delegate of the Ligurian association, became one of the new vice-presidents; until a few days earlier he had been in dispute with Sabattini over the events in Turin. On September 20, however, Olivetti returned to the leadership of the body and Marengo lost his position, while Cavazzana became the head of the newly formed committee of northern clubs of the Third and Fourth Divisions.

Meanwhile, on August 2, ratification of the agreement had taken place by the Federal Council, which had instructed the League to set the date and field of the match, and the representatives of Genoa and Bologna, showing deference to FIGC authority, had solemnly renewed the Parma pact. The provision of an investigation into the Porta Nuova shooting, however, produced no results, and the Bologna attackers were never identified.

5 July 1925

Genoa	1–1 (a.e.t.)	Bologna
Catto 26'		11' Schiavio

Stadio di Corso Marsiglia, Turin
Referee: A. Gama (Milan)

=== The last secret match ===
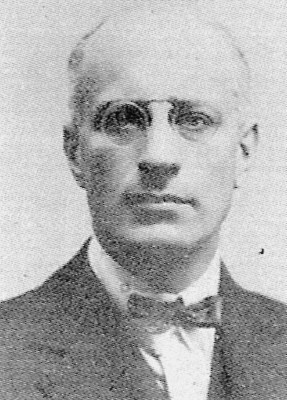
Hermann Felsner, Bologna coach and protagonist of the controversial “ball deal.”

In the days following the League assembly, the clubs were told the date and place of the match: on August 9 at 7 a.m., in Turin behind closed doors. Following the repeated prohibition of the prefect of the Piedmontese capital to let the match take place, it was moved to Milan at the last moment: Bologna had reached the Savoy city on Friday the 7th but, informed of the change of schedule, had to leave the next day for Lombardy; Genoa, on the other hand, reached the Milanese city directly on Saturday evening. The chosen playing field, the Vigentino field of the Società Ginnastica Forza e Coraggio, was kept secret from the public to avoid further incidents.

In the preceding weeks, the interruption of the championship had caused both clubs to reduce the intensity of their training, while still holding friendly matches to keep themselves in shape, and thus they had little time to prepare for the match in the best possible way. It was Genoa, however, who apparently suffered the most from the long competitive break: the last match, played in front of very few people present, was easily won 2–0 by the Felsinei (goals by Pozzi and Perin), despite the fact that they had ended the match with 9 men due to the expulsions of Alberto Giordani in the 13th minute of the second half and Giovanni Borgato in the 44th minute.

The Bolognese newspaper Il Resto del Carlino illustrated the match as worse in beauty but more emotional than the one in Turin, due respectively to the anomalous absence of the crowd and the heavy stakes, and identified Bologna's merits in the “cold calculation” with which it had played the match and in the “organicity” of its team play; the Voce Sportiva's concurrent report extolled the superiority highlighted by the winners, although the month-long break in the competition could theoretically facilitate the Genoan squad, more in need of recovering the energy lost during the course of the championship as they had a higher average age in comparison to that of Bologna. Both publications gave, however, credit to Genoa, which, while proving less effective and mobile than usual, had nevertheless tried until the end to turn the unfavorable match situation around.

As far as the Genoa press was concerned, it was the words of Vittorio Pozzo, an eyewitness to the five finals, in an editorial published on 22 August 1925 in Il Calcio, a weekly sports magazine edited by Rino Sacheri, that highlighted Bologna's ultimate success as the better team, both technically and physically:

The Northern League Championship as a whole and as an organisation has ended on a sad note for the future of the game, but at least it ended fairly, with the team in the best physical condition and with the best technical skills winning.

— Vittorio Pozzo, Il Calcio no. 50-51 p.3, Aug. 22, 1925

The Genoese newspaper Il Lavoro also claimed that the tournament was lost by Genoa on May 31, when the Bolognese redeemed themselves from their home defeat in the first leg final by storming the Marassi and forcing the defending champions into the play-offs; he commented that Bologna deservedly won the match because its performance was slightly inferior to the usual one, unlike the Genoans, who stumbled into a very bad day perhaps due to the early rise as well as to the abnormality of the match played at an unusual hour and in a silent environment; he finally added that, in spite of everything, the outcome of the match could have been different if Alberti's shot in the opening match had entered Bologna's goal instead of bouncing luckily off the knee of defender Mario Gianni.

The alleged longa manus of Fascism

Various pro-Genoan retrospectives assert that the poor performance on August 9 by the defending champions should be blamed, in addition to the aforementioned “ball affair,” on two other circumstances:

1) The fact that the Ligurian club allegedly stopped training and sent its athletes on vacation while waiting for government deliberations, receiving the federal summons for the playoff late, while Bologna, warned of developments well in advance, allegedly continued sporting activity.

2) The presence, during the match, of fascist comrades from Emilia who allegedly intimidated the rival team from the stands.

Such assumptions, the main proponent of which was Giovanni De Prà, actually contradict contemporary accounts of the match and the days leading up to it, which did not mention any vacation by the “Grifone” players, did not detect discrepancies in the timing of institutional communications (the clubs had already agreed on the final on July 26) nor differences in the quality of the clubs' preparation for the match (suboptimal for both teams), and did not report any participation of black shirts in the event (at least not inside the stadium).

Many years later, however, a backstory emerged that provoked new controversy in relation to the outcome of the Northern League final. The aforementioned Bolognese executive Sabattini declared, in fact, that he had secretly gone to Vigentino, in the company of coach Felsner, on the morning before the final playoff: there, with the complicity of the janitor (who was paid 20 lire for the “disturbance”), the pair could benefit from an inspection of the ground of the imminent match, received the assurance that the Bologna players would use the comfortable locker room reserved for the home team instead of the more cramped one for the away teams (although, the next day, the Emilians arrived at the stadium already in match attire, while the Ligurians took advantage of the Forza e Coraggio rooms), but above all they secured the advantage of using their own game balls, personally inflated by Felsner in such a way as to “favor the victory” of Bologna, instead of those provided for the field. It is unclear whether this last ruse was simply a superstitious gesture or a real trick, since, according to Sabattini, the exchange contrived by the Austrian coach had not made an “appreciable difference” in favor of the Petronians; nonetheless, the fact remains that the ploy went down in history as “the ball deal.”

Between the years 1960 and 1970, in a televised debate between Sabattini and the Genoese goalkeeper De Prà, the defender recounted that the Emilian midfielder Pietro Genovesi had confided the incident to him, explaining to his former rival that the game balls prepared by Felsner were lighter than the norm; the member of the Petronian club replied to the accusation by stating that the infamous balls had always been used in the matches played by the Bologna team over the course of the tournament (although visual evidence showed that the balls used in the match had 12 pentagons, not 18 like those Bologna normally used). In any case, as much as Sabattini's and Felsner's conduct may have been sportingly questionable, it has never been established that the stratagems they implemented irregularly affected the outcome of the fifth match and that there were legal grounds for a disqualification of the Felsinei or for yet another replay of the playoff; moreover, decisions regarding the use of the balls fell under the responsibility of referee Gama, who found no anomalies.

9 August 1925

Bologna	2–0	Genoa
Pozzi 28'; Perin 89'

Officine Meccaniche, Milan
Referee: A. Gama (Milan)

== Aftermath ==
=== Bologna's triumph ===
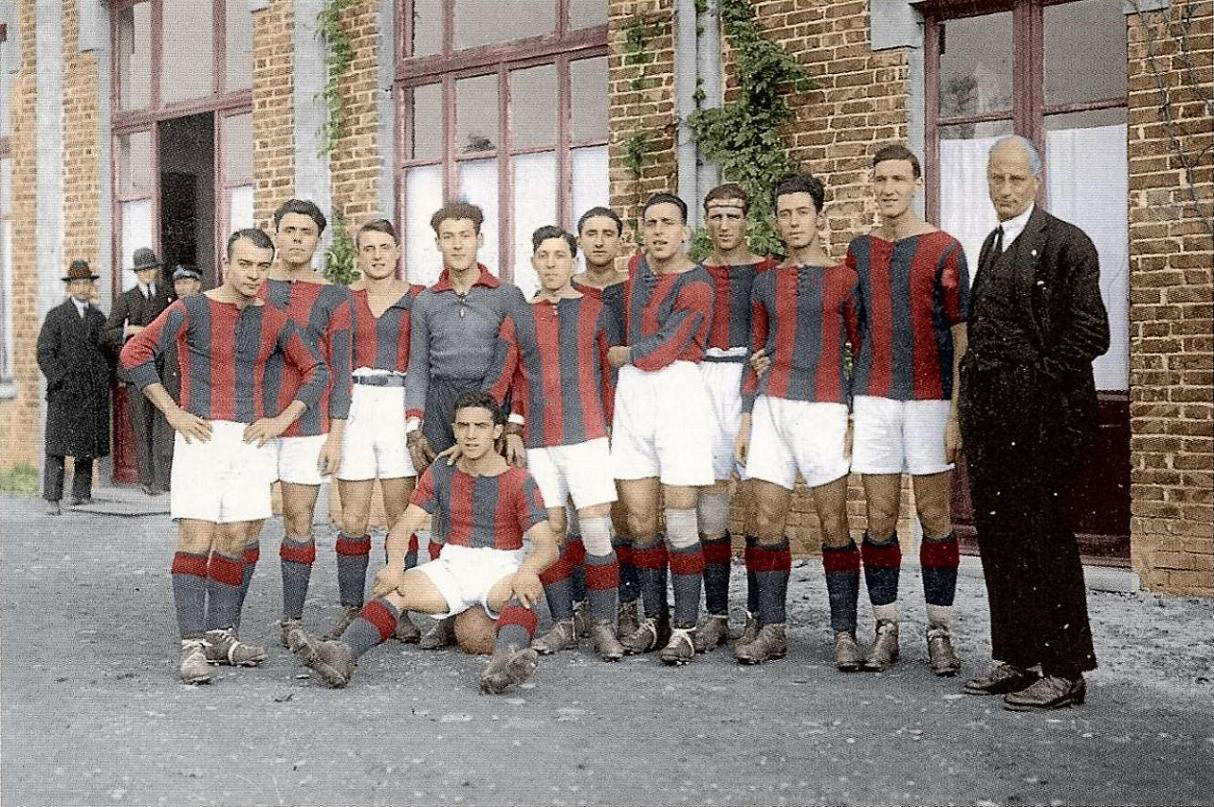
Bologna, Italian champions for the first time.

Thus it was that Bologna, at the end of an eleven-week battle with Genoa, achieved the coveted qualification to the national final. The Emilians found themselves up against Alba Roma, the newly crowned champions of central and southern Italy: the green-and-whites had won the Southern League without too much trouble, even though this success was marred by an alleged match-fixing. On the Albini, in fact, weighed the suspicion of having bribed the goalkeeper of Cavese Pasquarelli on the occasion of the direct clash between the two teams in the first leg of the interregional semifinals: the match in question had ended 5-0 for the Romans.

Similarly to the previous finales, the predictions saw Bologna as clear favorites by virtue of the technical gap that the northern formations almost always boasted over the peninsular ones. The first match between the Rossoblù and Alba, played on August 16 at the Sterlino, confirmed this tradition: the Felsinei dominated the match and prevailed 4–0, also taking advantage of the imperfect condition of their opponents, who had not played official matches for over a month in the long wait for the conclusion of the Northern League final.

The return match in Rome was again won by the Bolognese 2–0, despite an underwhelming performance; the Capitoline press, however, complained about two hypothetical refereeing errors against the hosts (a possible offside in the action of the first goal and the failure to concede a phantom goal to Alba at the end of the match). Bologna won, therefore, the first national title in its history, while Genoa failed to grasp the chance to boast its tenth Scudetto. This championship would later be nicknamed in journalistic circles as the Scudetto of the Pistols, in reference to the aforementioned Turin blood events.

=== Genoa's request for the reassignment of the title ===
In the decades following these events, various exponents and supporters of Genoa contested the regularity of the play-offs on several occasions, believing that the Northern League had robbed the Ligurian club of a victory by default in the final and that Bologna had benefited from favoritism granted by the Fascist regime. The Genoans, in particular, called this tournament the Theft of the Star, or the badge that has been awarded to Italian teams for every 10 championships won since 1958. Fans and affiliates of Bologna, on the contrary, refuted these claims, describing them as unsubstantiated and speculative and pointing out that the “Grifone” could be the subject of equal claims by the Bolognese themselves, about the disputed events of both 1925 and 1924. Contextually, there have been numerous historical reconstructions aimed at supporting or refuting, as the case may be, the two opposing theses.

In the late 1980s and early 1990s, former Genoa mayor Fulvio Cerofolini submitted a parliamentary interpellation to then Minister of Tourism and Entertainment Franco Carraro regarding the Scudetto of the Pistols. However, the promised opening of an investigation file into the circumstances that led Bologna to win the championship fell into oblivion due to the outbreak of the Tangentopoli scandal. In 2008, the British newspaper The Guardian included the third final between Bologna and Genoa in a list of the greatest regulatory misdeeds in football history.

In 2016, the Genoa Foundation expressed its intention to ask the FIGC to revoke the Scudetto from the Emilian team and reassign it to the Genoa club, an intention against which the Bologna supporters' associations reacted by pleading for the legitimacy of the championship. On October 30, 2018, Genoa announced its intention to ask the Federation to evaluate the awarding of the 1925 Scudetto ex aequo with Bologna for the alleged irregularities that occurred during Lega Nord matches, on and off the field; in turn, the Emilian club called the Ligurians' petition based on episodes that were “not substantiated,” as well as a “legal aberration” since it referred to the Lega Nord final and not to the national final.

At the Federal Council meeting on January 30, 2019, Federal President Gabriele Gravina proposed the creation of an ad hoc commission to analyze, with a historical-scientific approach, both Genoa's 1925 Scudetto request and the petitions of Lazio, Bologna, and Torino relating to the 1915 and 1927 championships; the collegial body was established the following May 30, and Matteo Marani, the vice-president of the Football Museum Foundation, was appointed to coordinate the university professors who make it up.

== See also ==
- 1924–25 Prima Divisione
- History of Bologna FC 1909
- History of Genoa CFC

== Bibliography ==
- Carlo Felice Chiesa (2012). La Grande storia del calcio italiano (pubblicata a puntate da Guerin Sportivo). Bologna: Conti Editore.
- Carlo Felice Chiesa; Riccardo Brizzi (2019). Bologna 1925. Fu vera gloria. Bologna: Minerva Edizioni.
- Giancarlo Rizzoglio (2018). La stella negata al grande Genoa. Genova: De Ferrari Editore.
