= List of Genoa CFC players =

Below is a list of notable footballers who have played for Genoa C.F.C.. Generally, this means players that have played 100 or more league matches for the club. However, some players who have played fewer matches are also included; this includes players that have had considerable success at other clubs, and players who have appeared at least once in the FIFA World Cup.

Players are listed according to the date of their first-team debut for the club. Appearances and goals are for first-team competitive domestic league matches only; wartime and playoff matches are excluded. Substitute appearances included. Players whose name is in bold currently play for the club.

Name	Nationality	Position	Genoa career	Appearances	Goals
James Richardson Spensley	England	GK	1896–1906	22	0
Renzo De Vecchi	Italy	DF	1913–1929	218	31
Ottavio Barbieri	Italy	MF	1919–1932	299	11
Giovanni De Prà	Italy	GK	1919–1933	304	0
Virgilio Levratto	Italy	MF	1925–1932	188	84
Guillermo Stábile	Argentina	FW	1930–1935	41	13
Amedeo Cattani	Italy	DF	1942-1955	311	5
Fosco Becattini	Italy	DF	1945-1961	425	1
Julio Abbadie	Uruguay	FW	1956–1960	94	24
Roberto Pruzzo	Italy	FW	1973–1978	143	57
Claudio Testoni	Italy	DF	1980-1987	183	0
René Vandereycken	Belgium	MF	1981–1983	28	0
Massimo Briaschi	Italy	FW	1982-1984, 1987-1990	122	34
Giovanni Cervone	Italy	GK	1984–1987	104	7
Stefano Eranio	Italy	MF	1984–1992	212	13
Luigi Marulla	Italy	FW	1985-1988	100	23
Vincenzo Torrente	Italy	DF	1985-2000	412	5
Angelo Trevisan	Italy	DF	1980-1985	108	1
Nicola Caricola	Italy	DF	1987-1995	225	6
Marco Nappi	Italy	FW	1988-1989, 1993-1994, 1995-1999	189	44
Roberto Onorati	Italy	MF	1988-1989, 1990-1996	200	15
Gennaro Ruotolo	Italy	MF	1988-2002	444	35
Gianluca Signorini	Italy	DF	1988–1995	207	5
Carlos Aguilera	Uruguay	FW	1989–1992	96	33
Mario Bortolazzi	Italy	MF	1990-1998	251	16
Tomas Skuhravy	Czech Republic	FW	1990–1995	164	59
Branco	Brazil	DF	1991–1993	71	8
John van 't Schip	Netherlands	MF	1992–1996	107	11
Dan Petrescu	Romania	DF	1993-1994	24	1
Michaël Goossens	Belgium	FW	1996–1997	36	12
Cosimo Francioso	Italy	FW	1998–2002	132	65
Marco Carparelli	Italy	FW	1999–2005	139	42
Claudiu Niculescu	Romania	FW	2002-2003	11	3
Domenico Criscito	Italy	MF	2002-2004, 2006-2011	153	10
**Marco Rossi**	Italy	MF	2003–	242	26
Diego Milito	Argentina	FW	2004-2005, 2008-2009	90	57
Omar Milanetto	Italy	MF	2006-2011	154	10
Giuseppe Sculli	Italy	FW	2006-2011	122	22
Julio César de León	Honduras	MF	2007-2008	50	8
**Giandomenico Mesto**	Italy	MF	2008-	100	7
Thiago Motta	Italy	MF	2008–2009	21	6
Hernán Crespo	Argentina	FW	2009–2010	16	5
David Suazo	Honduras	FW	2010-2011	16	3
Mattia Perin	Italy	GK	2010-2018, 2019-2021	148	0
Milan Badelj	Croatia	MF	2020–2025	146	7

== Key ==
- GK — Goalkeeper
- DF — Defender
- MF — Midfielder
- FW — Forward

Nationalities are indicated by the corresponding FIFA country code.
