= Fawcus =

Fawcus is a surname. Notable people with the surname include:

- Dan Fawcus (1858 – 1925), English professional football player and administrator
- Ernest Fawcus (1895 – 1966), English cricketer
- Leslie Fawcus (1898 – 1967), English school teacher, soldier and amateur cricketer
- Peter Fawcus (1915 – 2003), British colonial administrator
- William Fawcus (born 1850), British rower
- Brian Fawcus (1961 -), English photographer
