= Franco Scoglio =

Italian football manager (1941–2005)

Personal information
- Birth name: Francesco Scoglio
- Date of birth: 2 May 1941
- Place of birth: Lipari, Kingdom of Italy
- Date of death: 3 October 2005 (aged 64)
- Place of death: Genoa, Italy
- Positions: Defender; midfielder

Managerial career
- Years: Team
- 1972–1973: Reggina (youth team)
- 1973–1974: Gioiese
- 1974–1975: Messina
- 1975–1976: Gioiese
- 1976–1977: Acireale
- 1977–1978: Spezia (technical manager)
- 1978–1979: Reggina
- 1980–1981: Messina
- 1981–1982: Gioiese
- 1982–1983: Reggina
- 1983–1984: Akragas
- 1984–1988: Messina
- 1988–1990: Genoa
- 1990–1991: Bologna
- 1991–1992: Udinese
- 1992–1993: Lucchese
- 1993: Pescara
- 1993–1995: Genoa
- 1995–1996: Torino
- 1996–1997: Cosenza
- 1997–1998: Ancona
- 1998–2001: Tunisia
- 2001–2002: Genoa
- 2002: Libya
- 2002–2003: Napoli

Francesco "Franco" Scoglio (Italian pronunciation: [ˈfraŋko ˈskɔʎʎo]; 2 May 1941 – 3 October 2005) was an Italian football manager who coached at both national and international level.

== Playing career ==
Francesco Scoglio was born in Lipari, in the province of Messina, Italy. He played as a defender or midfielder.

== Managerial career ==
Nicknamed il Professore (the Professor) because of his past teaching activity (he was a pedagogy graduate), Scoglio never actually had a playing career. He started a managing career in 1972 in one of the Reggina youth teams. He then went on coaching at amateur and Serie C levels in Sicily and Calabria (Gioiese, Messina, Acireale, Akragas). It was Scoglio who discovered the great potential of Salvatore Schillaci, one of his players during Scoglio's second stint in Messina.

However, Scoglio is most remembered for his time in Genoa CFC, which was also the team for which he first coached. He achieved great success with his next clubs, being often fired before the end of the season. He is also known for having coached the national teams of Tunisia and Libya. Under his management, Tunisia reached the semi-finals of the 2000 African Cup of Nations. His last coaching (and unsuccessful) experience was on 2002–2003 for SSC Napoli.

== After retirement ==
Scoglio then became a very popular TV commentator on football shows in Italy, and even worked for Al Jazeera as the technical expert reporting on the Italian league.

== Death ==
On 3 October 2005, Scoglio was appearing on a regional television station in Genoa, having a rather heated and passionate, yet civil, discussion with Genoa president Enrico Preziosi. While Preziosi was answering one of Scoglio's charges, Scoglio lost consciousness and slumped in his chair. He died of an apparent heart attack shortly thereafter. This dramatic event fulfilled his own prophecy "I'll die talking about Genoa CFC" (Morirò parlando del Genoa).

== Legacy ==
Following his death, in 2016 the city of Messina, the provincial capital of his birthplace as well as the home of ACR Messina, a club he coached for many years, honoured his memory by renaming the local stadium after him.
