= Luigi Burlando =

Italian footballer

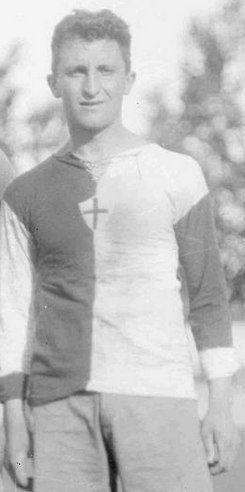
- Luigi Virgilio Romolo Burlando

Personal information
- Full name: Luigi Virgilio Romolo Burlando
- Date of birth: 23 January 1899
- Place of birth: Genoa, Italy
- Date of death: 12 December 1967 (aged 68)
- Position: Midfielder

Senior career*
Years	Team	Apps	(Gls)
1919–1921	Doria	8	(1)
1921–1931	Genoa	133	(5)

International career
1920–1925	Italy	19	(1)

Managerial career
- 1931–1932: Genoa
- * Club domestic league appearances and goals

Luigi Burlando (Italian pronunciation: [luˈiːdʒi burˈlando]; 23 January 1899 – 12 December 1967) was an Italian football midfielder and manager. He also played water polo.

== Club career ==
Originally from Genoa, he played all of his career in his hometown, starting off with Doria, before spending a decade with Genoa.

== International career ==
At international level, Burlando most notably represented Italy at the 1920 and the 1924 Summer Olympics. He made 19 appearances for Italy in total between 1920 and 1925, scoring once. He also competed in the men's water polo tournament at the 1920 Summer Olympics.

== Honours ==
Genoa

- Italian Football Championship: 1922–23, 1923–24
