= Edoardo Catto =

Italian footballer (1900-1963)

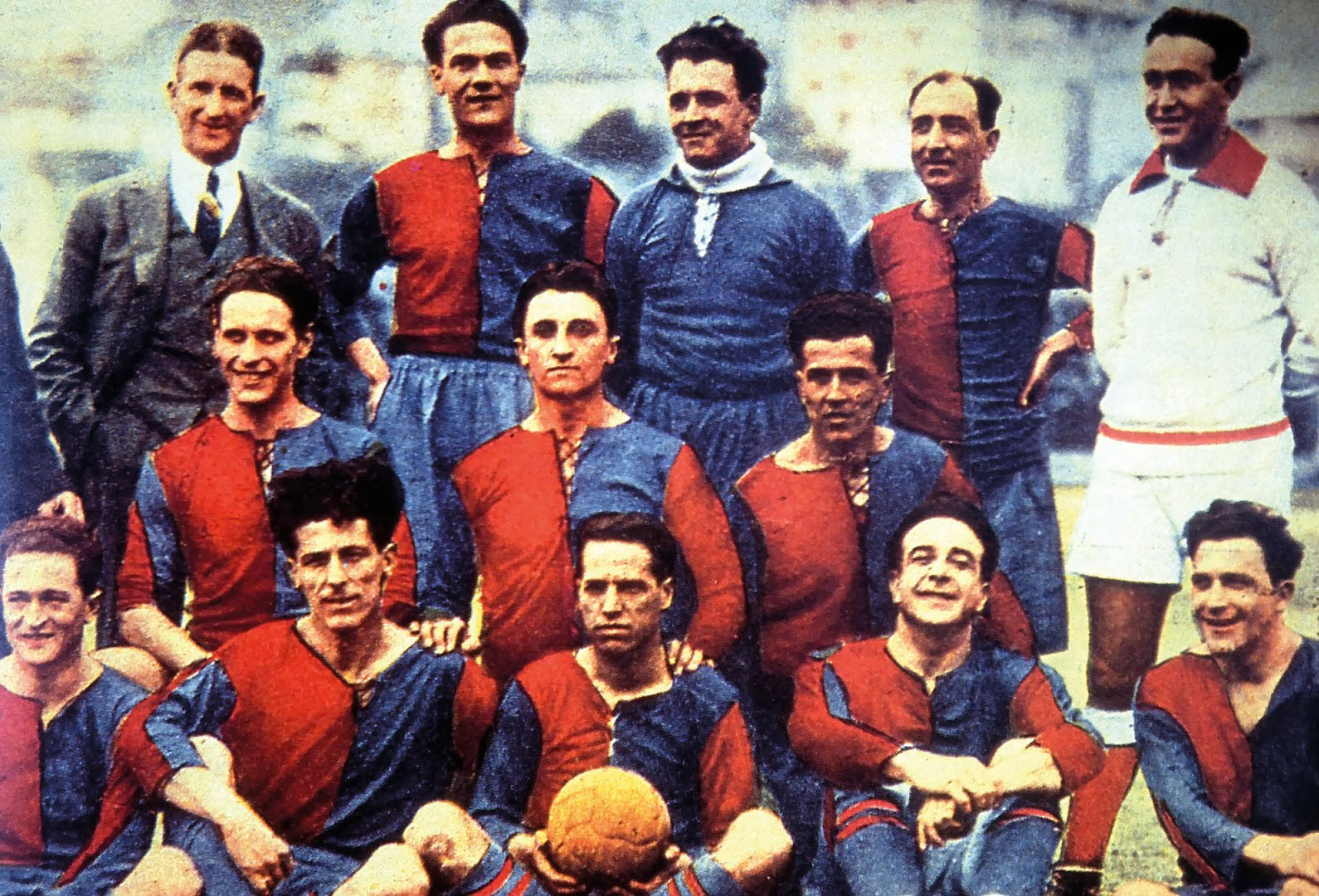
- Genoa Cricket and Football Club 1923-1924

Personal information
- Date of birth: 23 September 1900
- Place of birth: Genoa, Kingdom of Italy
- Date of death: 27 November 1963 (aged 63)
- Place of death: Genoa, Italy
- Position: Striker

Senior career*
Years	Team	Apps	(Gls)
1919–1921	Serenitas		
1921–1929	Genoa	199	(92)

International career
1924	Italy	1	(0)
- * Club domestic league appearances and goals

Edoardo Catto (Italian pronunciation: [edoˈardo ˈkatto]; 23 September 1900 – 27 November 1963) was an Italian professional footballer who played as a striker.

He made his only appearance for the Italy national football team on 9 March 1924 in a game against Spain.

He is Genoa C.F.C.'s number one scorer in history with 92 goals in the Italian championship. He won the Italian championship with the club in 1922–23 and 1923–24.
