= Manlio Bacigalupo =

Italian footballer and manager

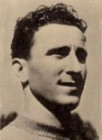
- Manlio Bacigalupo.

Personal information
- Full name: Manlio Bacigalupo
- Date of birth: 5 September 1908
- Place of birth: Vado Ligure, Italy
- Position: Goalkeeper

Senior career*
Years	Team	Apps	(Gls)
1926–1927	Andrea Doria	18	(0)
1927–1929	Torino	10	(0)
1929–1938	Genoa	165	(0)
1933–1934	→ Sampierdarenese (loan)	30	(0)
1938–1941	Venezia	56	(0)
1941–1942	Entella	3	(0)
1942–1943	Genoa		

Managerial career
- 1950–1951: Genoa
- 1955–1957: Messina
- * Club domestic league appearances and goals

Manlio Bacigalupo (5 September 1908 – 1 December 1977) was an Italian association football goalkeeper and manager from Vado Ligure, Savona.

== Playing career ==
Over the course of his career, Bacigalupo played for five Italian sides, spending most of his time with Genoa and Venezia, also playing for Torino.

== Personal life ==
Manilo's brother, Valerio Bacigalupo, was also a footballer, and the goalkeeper of the Grande Torino side, that died in the Superga air disaster.

== Honours ==
Torino

- Italian Football Championship: 1927–28

Genoa

- Serie B: 1934–35
- Coppa Italia: 1936–37

Venezia

- Coppa Italia: 1940–41
