= Claudio Maselli =

Italian footballer and manager (born 1950)

Personal information
- Full name: Claudio Maselli
- Date of birth: 21 September 1950 (age 76)
- Place of birth: Rome, Italy
- Position: Midfielder

Youth career
- Tevere Rome

Senior career*
Years	Team	Apps	(Gls)
1968–1974	Genoa	158	(5)
1974–1979	Bologna	145	(8)
1979–1980	Brescia	32	(3)
1980–1981	Monza	27	(0)

Managerial career
- 1993: Genoa
- 1994–1995: Genoa
- 1996–1997: Genoa
- 1998–2000: Alessandria
- 2000–2001: Rimini
- 2001–2002: Campobasso
- 2002–2004: Cremonese
- 2004–2006: Naftex Burgas
- 2006–2008: Lavagnese
- 2008: Novese
- * Club domestic league appearances and goals as of 2 March 2010

Claudio Maselli (born 21 September 1950) is an Italian professional former footballer and manager.

== Career ==
=== Footballer ===
As a footballer, he played several seasons in Serie A for Genoa and Bologna.

=== Coach ===
As a coach, he initially managed Genoa youth team, occasionally training even the first team in Serie A and B. Later he followed several clubs in Serie C and Serie D; between 2004 and 2006 he trained Naftex, in Bulgaria. In 2000, he won a promotion in Serie C1 with Alessandria.
