= Ottavio Barbieri =

Italian footballer and manager

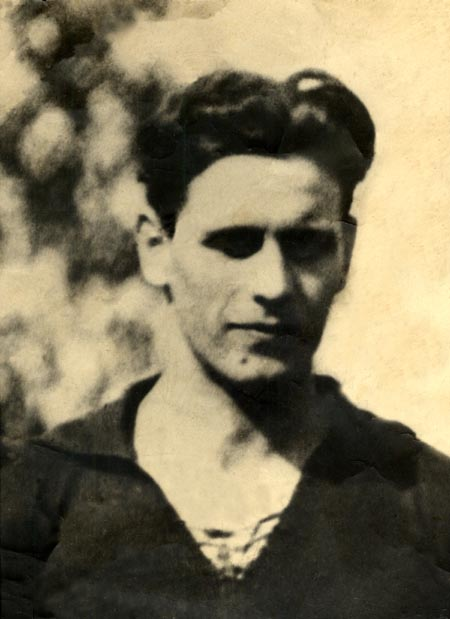

Personal information
- Full name: Ottavio Barbieri
- Date of birth: 30 April 1899
- Place of birth: Genoa, Italy
- Date of death: 28 December 1949 (aged 50)
- Position: Right midfielder

Senior career*
Years	Team	Apps	(Gls)
1919–1932	Genoa	299	(11)

International career
1921–1930	Italy	21	(0)

Managerial career
- 1936–1938: Atalanta
- 1939–1941: Genoa
- 1944: Spezia
- 1945–1946: Genoa
- * Club domestic league appearances and goals

Ottavio Barbieri (Italian pronunciation: [otˈtaːvjo barˈbjеːri]; 30 April 1899 – 28 December 1949) was an Italian association football midfielder and manager. He won campionato Alta Italia 1944 (Champion of Italy de facto).

== Club career ==
Originally from Genoa, as a player Barbieri was a one club man, and spent his entire club career at hometown side Genoa.

== International career ==
At international level, Barbieri most notably represented Italy 1924 Summer Olympics football tournament.

== Managing career ==
As a manager, Barbieri led L'Aquila Calcio during the 1933–34 season, winning the Italian 1st Division Championship and bringing the team to serie B for the first time. He later worked with Atalanta in Serie B between 1936 and 1938, before coming back to Genoa, now as a coach, in 1939. In 1944 won campionato Alta Italia 1944 (champion of Italy de facto) with Spezia.

== Style of management ==
Barbieri have introduced the sweeper role to Italian football during his time as Genoa manager. Influenced by Karl Rappan's verrou, he made several alterations to the English WM system (known as the sistema in Italy), which led to his system being described as mezzosistema. His system used a man-marking back-line, with three-man-marking defenders and a full-back who was described as a terzino volante (or vagante, as noted at the time by former footballer and Gazzetta dello Sport journalist Renzo De Vecchi); the latter position was essentially a libero, which was later also used by Giuseppe Viani in his vianema system, and Nereo Rocco in his catenaccio system. The team's midfield played in a triangular shape, with the centre-half-back – known as the centromediano metodista or "metodista," in Italy – fielded in front of the back-line. His formation also made use of three forwards in attacking trident, but the right-sided winger was also tasked with assisting the midfield defensively, and therefore acted in the manner of a right-sided wide midfielder, known as the tornante in Italian football.

== Honours ==
=== Player ===
Genoa

- Italian Football Championship: 1922–23, 1923–24

=== Manager ===
Spezia

- Campionato Alta Italia 1944
