= Dan Fawcus =

English footballer and administrator

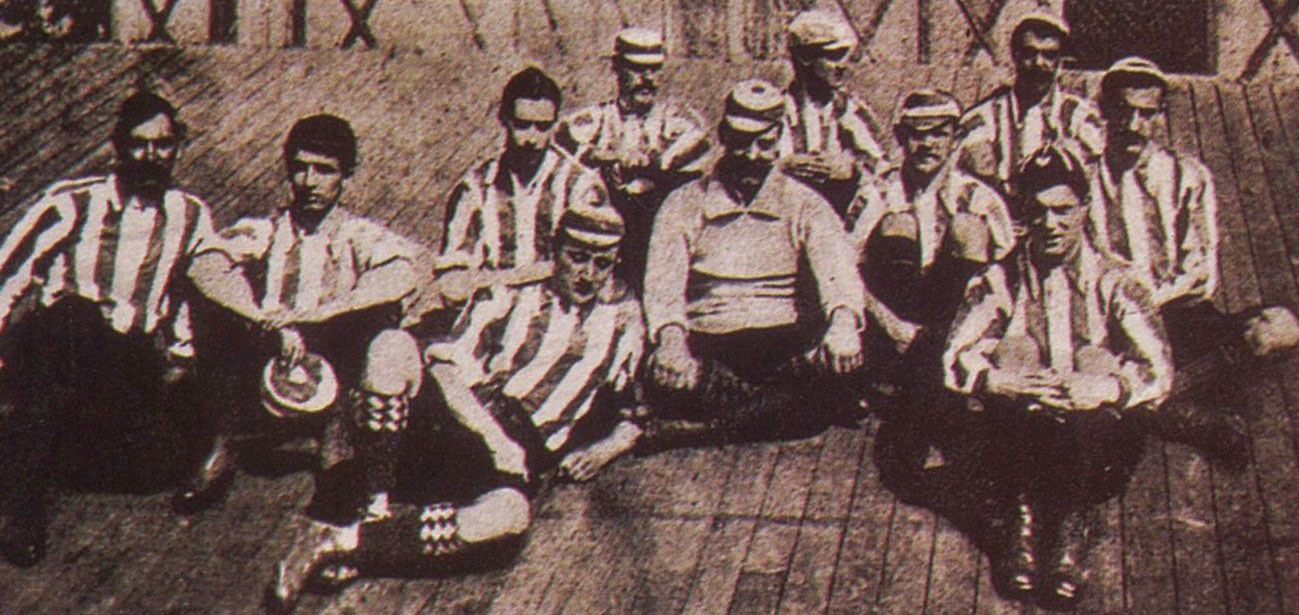

Personal information
- Date of birth: 1858
- Place of birth: North Shields, England
- Date of death: 1925 (aged 66–67)
- Place of death: Blonay, Switzerland

Senior career*
Years	Team	Apps	(Gls)
1898–1900	Genoa		
- * Club domestic league appearances and goals

Daniel G. Fawcus (1858 – 1925) was an English professional football player and administrator active throughout Europe.

== Career ==
Fawcus was a player of Italian club Genoa between 1898 and 1900, after being one of the original founders of the club in 1893. By 1901 Fawcus had become Genoa's president, and started a three-yearly competition called the Fawcus Cup.
