= Giovanni De Prà =

Italian footballer

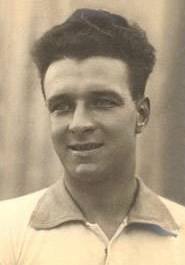

Personal information
- Date of birth: 28 June 1900
- Place of birth: Genoa, Kingdom of Italy
- Date of death: 15 June 1979 (aged 78)
- Place of death: Genoa, Italy
- Position: Goalkeeper

Senior career*
Years	Team	Apps	(Gls)
1919–1933	Genoa	304	(0)

International career
1924–1928	Italy	19	(0)
Medal record
Italy
Summer Olympics
Bronze medal – third place	1928 Amsterdam
Central European International Cup
Gold medal – first place	1927–30 Central European International Cup
- * Club domestic league appearances and goals

Giovanni Luigi Cecilio De Prà (Italian pronunciation: [dʒoˈvanni de ˈpra]; 28 June 1900 – 15 June 1979) was an Italian football goalkeeper.

== Career ==
D Prà spent his entire club career with his hometown side Genoa C.F.C., playing more than 300 games over almost 15 years.

D Prà competed at the 1924 and 1928 Summer Olympics with Italy, and won a bronze medal in 1928. as back up for Gianpiero Combi.

He started the first 4 matches in the Central European International Cup: 1927–30 campaign but also here lost his starter position to Gianpiero Combi after the summer of 1928. But remained a part of the successive gold medal winning Italy national side.

== Honours ==
=== Club ===
Genoa

- Italian Football Championship: 1922–23, 1923–24

=== International ===
Italy

- Central European International Cup: 1927–30
- Summer Olympics: Bronze 1928
