= William Garbutt =

English footballer (1883–1964)

Personal information
- Full name: William Thomas Garbutt
- Date of birth: 9 January 1883
- Place of birth: Hazel Grove, England
- Date of death: 24 February 1964 (aged 81)
- Place of death: Warwick, England
- Position: Outside right

Senior career*
| Years | Team | Apps | (Gls) |
| 1903–1906 | Reading | | |
| 1906–1908 | Woolwich Arsenal | 52 | (8) |
| 1908–1911 | Blackburn Rovers | 82 | (10) |
| 1911–1912 | Woolwich Arsenal | 0 | (0) |

Managerial career
- 1912–1927: Genoa
- 1913–1914: Italy
- 1927–1929: Roma
- 1929–1935: Napoli
- 1935–1937: Athletic Bilbao
- 1937: Milan
- 1937–1940: Genoa
- 1946–1948: Genoa
- * Club domestic league appearances and goals

William Thomas Garbutt (9 January 1883 – 24 February 1964) was an English professional football coach and player. His contribution to Italian football through laying the foundations of player training and coaching popularized the sport in the nation, and he was widely considered the model for professional managers in Italy.

Born in the small village of Hazel Grove in Stockport, Garbutt featured for Reading, Woolwich Arsenal, and Blackburn Rovers, but featured irregularly for each side, suffering persistent injuries. This forced Garbutt to retire in 1912, aged 29. He then relocated to Italy to seek employment as a dockworker in Genoa, but was soon appointed as the head coach for the local team. Following his arrival, Garbutt restructured training regimes, introduced new tactics, and conducted Italy's first ever paid player transfers.

Garbutt would depart to join the newly formed Roma in 1927, where he secured a Coppa CONI title, and then moved further south to coach Napoli in 1929. In 1935, Garbutt departed Italy for Spain to coach Athletic Bilbao, where he won a La Liga title in 1936. He returned later that year for a brief reign at Milan, and was soon re-appointed at Genoa. After the end of World War II, Garbutt returned to Genoa for a third time in 1946, prior to retiring in 1948.

Although his achievements are not widely known in his home country, Garbutt is credited with helping lay the groundwork for the nation to secure victory during the 1934 and 1938 FIFA World Cups.

== Biography ==
Garbutt was born, the son of a carpenter in a small village near Stockport. His family was large, sharing his home with his parents, grandmother, six older sisters and a younger brother. Joining the army at a young age, the young William Garbutt first played football there for the Royal Artillery.

After returning from duties, he began his club football playing career with Reading during the 1903 season and played for them in the Southern League, before leaving in December 1905.

The young winger moved to join Woolwich Arsenal for two seasons, and made his debut in a First Division match away to Preston North End on 23 December 1905, which finished 2–2. He made 80 appearances for the London club in three years, including 52 in the League, despite injuries ruling him out of much of the 1906–07 season. He was part of the Arsenal side that reached two FA Cup semi-finals in successive seasons; however he was eventually displaced by Jackie Mordue and after spending much of 1907–08 in the reserves he left for Blackburn Rovers in May 1908.

He spent four seasons playing for Blackburn, making 82 league appearances and reaching another FA Cup semi-final; he also won a cap playing for the Football League XI. He may have returned to Woolwich Arsenal briefly for a second spell in 1911–12, but this is not recorded in official club histories and he definitely did not play a senior-level match during this time. His playing career having been blighted by injuries, he retired from playing in 1912, aged 29.

=== Genoa: Impact on Italian football ===
He moved to Genoa, Italy to work on the docks after retiring from playing football, to support his family.

He was appointed as the new head coach of Genoa CFC on 30 July 1912, with no previous experience and only aged 29. It is not clear how he came to be their manager, some reports say he was recommended by Vittorio Pozzo; who would go on to coach Italy to two World Cups. Indeed, Pozzo became acquainted with him during a stint in England, but he had no particular relationship with Genoa C.F.C. and he was surprised when he met Garbutt again in Italy. Others state it was Genoa's youth coach, an Irishman named Thomas Coggins, who pushed for Garbutt's appointment.

Garbutt restructured the training regimes, putting a heavy emphasis on players physical fitness and tactics. This was not the only part of managing in Italy that Garbutt set the proto-type for; he conducted Italy's first ever paid player transfers, where he signed two players from Andrea Doria and one from A.C. Milan. As well as making Genoa the first Italian football club to play outside of Italy; thanks to his connections back home in England he was able to take Genoa to play his old club Reading.

From when Garbutt first took over in 1912, until 1927 when he left the club, Genoa were victorious in the Italian Football Championship three different times; 1915, 1923 and 1924. The latter of which to this day, is the last time Genoa won the Serie A championship.

=== Post-Genoa adventures ===
On 22 July 1927 a new club was founded from the merger of numerous clubs in Italy's capital of Rome, the new club in question was A.S. Roma and Garbutt was brought in as their first ever manager. He stayed there for only two years but captured a tournament named Coppa CONI with them, as well as helping them reach third in group A of the Italian Football Championship.

Garbutt moved on next to Naples, taking over from Giovanni Terrile at S.S.C. Napoli. It was a legendary time for the club with stars such as Attila Sallustro and Antonio Vojak. This groundbreaking time for Napoli saw new club records set for the time, with them finishing third in the 1933–34 season of Serie A. Napoli would not achieve this again until the 1960s.

In search of a new adventure, Garbutt moved to Spain in 1935. He took up the position as manager of Athletic Bilbao, leading them to the Spanish Championship which they won over Real Madrid by two points. He returned to Italy in 1937, taking over very briefly at A.C. Milan.

=== Later years ===
William Garbutt soon moved back to the club where he was held in such high regard; Genoa. Since Garbutt had left in the 1920s, Genoa had gone into a slump even being relegated at one point. But with Garbutt back at the helm he coached the club back up to 3rd in his first season back.

His return would be short lived however, as a British citizen he was exiled under Benito Mussolini's fascists and returned home to England. After the end of World War II, Garbutt returned to Genoa for a third time and then returned home. By the time Garbutt died in 1964, he was an anonymous octogenarian living in reduced circumstances in Leamington Spa. Yet every newspaper in Italy carried a lavish obituary. He was deeply mourned, in Pozzo's words as 'the most important man in the history of Italian football'.

== Honours ==
=== Player ===
Blackburn Rovers

- Lancashire Cup: 2: 1909, 1911

=== Coach ===
Genoa

- Italian Football Championship: 1915, 1923, 1924

Roma

- Coppa Coni: 1928

Athletic Bilbao

- La Liga: 1935–36
