= Genoa CFC =

Association football club in Italy

Genoa
- Full name: Genoa Cricket and Football Club S.p.A.
- Nicknames: Il Grifone (The Griffin); I Rossoblù (The Red and Blues); Il Vecchio Balordo (The Old Fool)
- Founded: 7 September 1893; 133 years ago
- Stadium: Stadio Luigi Ferraris
- Capacity: 33,205
- Owner: Dan Șucu
- President: Dan Șucu
- Head coach: Daniele De Rossi
- League: Serie A
- 2025–26: Serie A, 16th of 20
- Website: genoacfc.it
Home colours	Away colours	Third colours

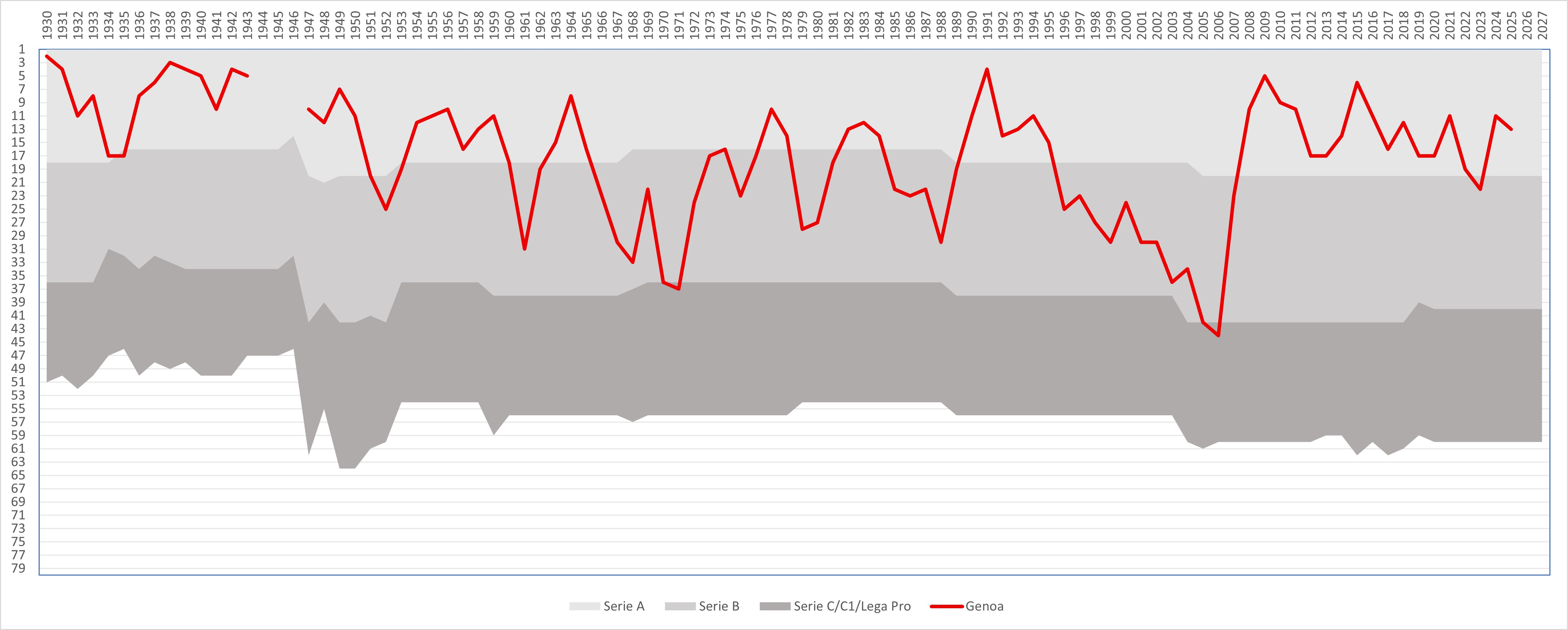
The performance of Genoa in the Italian football league structure since the first season of a unified Serie A (1929–30). Their Scudetti lie before this era.

Genoa Cricket and Football Club (Italian pronunciation: [ˈdʒɛːnoa]) is an Italian professional football club based in Genoa, Liguria. The team competes in Serie A, the top division of the Italian football league system.

Established in 1893, Genoa is Italy's oldest existing football team. The club has won the Italian Championship nine times, with their first being Italy's inaugural national championship in 1898, and their most recent coming after the 1923–24 season. They have also won one Coppa Italia title. Overall, Genoa are the fourth most successful Italian club in terms of championships won. Il Grifone have played their home games at the Stadio Luigi Ferraris since 1911, sharing with local rivals Sampdoria. The fixture between the two teams, known as the Derby della Lanterna, was first played in 1946.

In 2011, Genoa was included in the "International Bureau of Cultural Capitals" (a sort of historical sporting heritage of humanity, in line with that of UNESCO) at the request of President Xavier Tudela. The club was admitted to the "Club of Pioneers", an association comprising the world's oldest football clubs, in 2013; other members include Sheffield F.C. and Recreativo de Huelva.

== History ==
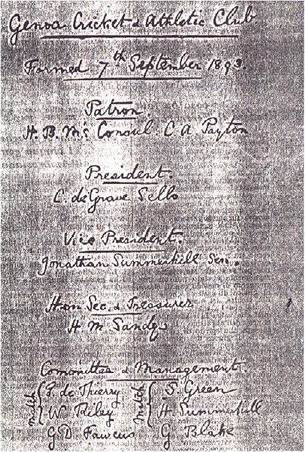
Act of foundation of Genoa CFC, dated September 1893

The club was founded on 7 September 1893 as Genoa Cricket & Athletic Club. In its earliest years, it principally competed in athletics and cricket. Association football was only a secondary concern. Since the club was set up to represent England abroad, the original shirts worn by the organisation were white, the same colour as the Cricket section of the club (white shirt, black trousers and socks). At first Italians were not permitted to join as it was a British sporting club abroad. Genoa's activities took place in the north-west of the city in the Campasso area, at the Piazza d'Armi. The men who initially handled the management of the club were;

- Charles De Grave Sells
- S. Blake
- G. Green
- W. Riley

- Daniel G. Fawcus
- Sandys
- E. De Thierry
- Jonathan Summerhill Sr.

- Jonathan Summerhill Jr.
- Sir Charles Alfred Payton

On 10 April 1897, the footballing section of the club, already in existence since 1893, became predominant thanks to James Richardson Spensley. It was among the oldest in Italian football at the time, only four other clubs—all in Turin—had been founded. Italians were allowed to join and found a new ground in the form of Ponte Carrega. The first friendly match took place at home, against a mixed team of Internazionale Torino and F.B.C. Torinese; Genoa lost 1–0. Not long after, Genoa recorded its first victory away against UPS Alessandria winning 2–0. Friendly games also took place against various British sailors such as those from HMS Revenge.

=== Championship dominance ===
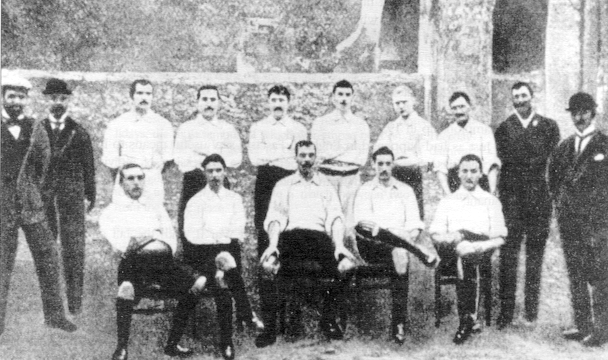
Genoa CAC in 1898, the first ever Italian Championship winners

Football in Italy stepped up a level with the creation of the Italian Football Federation and the Italian Football Championship. Genoa competed in the first Italian Championship in 1898 at Velodrome Humbert I in Turin. They defeated Ginnastica Torino 2–1 in their first official game on 8 May, before winning the first championship later that day by beating Internazionale Torino 3–1 after extra-time.

Genoa returned for the following season, this time with a few changes; the name of the club was altered to Genoa Cricket & Football Club, dropping the Athletic from its name. A change in shirt colour was also in order, as they changed to white and blue vertical stripes; known in Italy as biancoblù. Genoa won their second title in a one-day tournament which took place on 16 April 1899, by beating Internazionale Torino 3–1 for the second time. On their way to winning their third consecutive title in 1900 they also beat local rivals Sampierdarenese 7–0; a winning margin which would not be bettered by any team in the league until 1910. The final was secured with a 3–1 win over F.B.C. Torinese.

The club strip was changed again in 1901, Genoa adopted its famous grenade red-navy halves and therefore became known as the rossoblù; these are the colours used even to this day as with many other Italian clubs, such as Vado Ligure, Lumezzane, Cagliari, Bologna, Crotone, Cosenza and an endless list of other clubs, It Is worth to be said that Genoa has had a role behind the choice of the colours Red and Blue by these and more clubs, essentially because of its influence in italian football and the prestige of the genoese club before the Juventus, Inter and Milan dominion. After a season of finishing runners-up to Milan Cricket and Football Club, things were back on track in 1902 with their fourth title. Juventus emerged as serious contenders to Genoa's throne from 1903 onwards, when for two seasons in a row Genoa beat the Old Lady in the national final.

Notably Genoa became the first Italian football team to play an international match, when they visited France on 27 April 1903 to play FVC Nice, winning the fixture 3–0. As well as winning the Italian championship in 1904, the year was also notable for Genoa reserves winning the first ever II Categoria league season; a proto-Serie B under the top level. From 1905 onwards when they were runners-up, Genoa lost their foothold on the Italian championship; other clubs such as Juventus, Milan and Pro Vercelli stepped up.

The fall in part during this period can be traced back to 1908 when FIGC agreed to Federal Gymnastics protests forbidding the use of foreign players. Since Genoa's birth they had always had a strong English contingent. They disagreed, as did several other prominent clubs such as Milan, Torino and Firenze; as thus they withdrew from official FIGC competitions that year. The following season the federation reversed the decision and Genoa was rebuilt with players such as Luigi Ferraris and some from Switzerland, such as Daniel Hug who came from FC Basel. The rebuilding of the squad also saw the creation of a new ground in the Marassi area of Genoa, when built it had a capacity of 25,000 and was comparable to British stadiums of the time; it was officially opened on 22 January 1911.

=== Garbutt revival ===
With the introduction of the Italy national football team, Genoa played an important part, with the likes of Renzo De Vecchi; who was azzurri captain for some time, Edoardo Mariani and Enrico Sardi earning call-ups. Englishman William Garbutt was brought in as head coach to help revive the club; Garbutt was the first professional manager in Italy and was renowned for being highly charismatic, and also for constantly smoking his tobacco pipe. He was dubbed "Mister" by the players; since then Italians have referred to coaches in general by the term.

Finally by 1914–15, Genoa had restored themselves as the top club from Northern Italy, winning the final round of the Northern section. However, this particular year, the national final could not be played because of the outbreak of World War I, the finals of the Southern Italian section could not be decided and thus Genoa did not have a team to play. Genoa would be awarded the title in 1919 after the end of the war, it would be their first for eleven seasons. The war took a harsh toll on Genoa as players Luigi Ferraris, Adolfo Gnecco, Carlo Marassi, Alberto Sussone and Claudio Casanova all died while on military duty in Italy; while footballing founder James Richardson Spensley was killed in Germany.

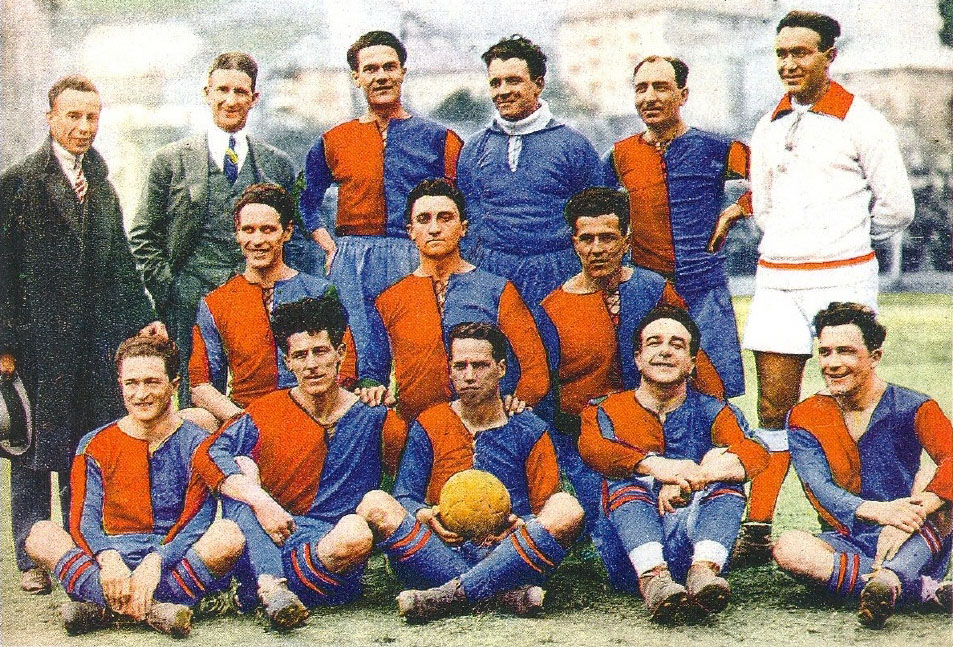
The last Genoa side to win the Italian Football Championship, in 1924

In the early part of the 1920s, Genoa remained strong contenders in the Northern section. Garbutt led Genoa to championship success in 1922–23; beating Lazio 6–1 in the final, over the course of two legs. The following season, Genoa made their way past Bologna in the Northern finals, but not without controversy; after riots in the second leg during the game in Bologna, the game was called off and FIGC awarded Genoa a 2–0 victory. Bologna won their first championship In Great controversy, with the shadow of the fascist regime (Leandro Arpinati, a prominent and influential fascist gerarca form Bologna was a key figure), and the British news paper "the Guardian", described the events of what went down in history as the "scudetto delle pistole" (the pistols' scudetto) as the greatest injustice ever suffered by a football team. In the national final that season, Genoa beat Savoia 4–1 over the course of two legs; this would be their ninth and to date final Italian championship.

The squad during these two championship victories included; Giovanni De Prà, Ottavio Barbieri, Luigi Burlando and Renzo De Vecchi. With Genoa's championship victory in 1923–24 came the introduction of the scudetto patch; which means following the season within which a club wins an Italian league championship, they are allowed to wear a shield shaped patch on their shirt which features the colours of the Italian flag. For the rest of the 1920s, the club's highest finish was in second place: the 1927–28 season when Genoa finished runners-up to Torino, with striker Felice Levratto scoring 20 goals in 27 games.

=== Genova 1893 period ===
Due to the strongly British connotations attached to the name, Genoa were forced to change it by the fascist government to Genova 1893 Circolo del Calcio in 1928. The club competed in a proto-European Cup in the form of the Mitropa Cup, where they went out in the quarter-finals after losing heavily to Rapid Vienna. They followed this with a runners-up position back at home in the league, they finished behind Ambrosiana in the 1929–30 season; this would be their last top level championship runners-up spot to date.

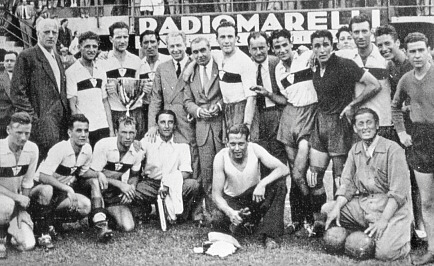
Genoa Coppa Italia winning side of 1937, celebrating in Florence.

The club's league form became highly erratic during the early 1930s, with varying league positions; it was during the 1933–34 season that Genova suffered their first ever relegation to Serie B, the second league of Italian football. Thankfully for the club, they were able to bounce back under the management of Vittorio Faroppa, winning promotion by finishing top of their group ahead of Novara. In 1936, the ambitious Juan Culiolo took over as chairman of the club; in 1936–37 they achieved a 6th-place finish and also won the Coppa Italia by beating Roma 1–0 with a goal from Mario Torti.

During the following season Genova finished in third place, this was a particularly tight season with winners Ambrosiana-Inter finishing only three points ahead of the club. That summer Italy competed in the 1938 FIFA World Cup and won, three Genova players formed part of the triumphant squad in the form of Sergio Bertoni, Mario Genta and Mario Perazzolo. The club finished the decade on a high, maintaining a top five foothold in the top level of the Italian football league system.

World War II affected dramatically the entire Italian football movement, but Genova did not recover as well as other clubs. In 1945, the club chose to revert their name to Genoa Cricket and Foot-Ball Club, the one which they had used in the very early days of the Italian championship. In the years just after the war, the club were still popular with the fans, with people previously associated with the club such as Ottavio Barbieri and William Garbutt returning for managerial spells. Genoa also had a new rival in the form of Sampdoria, who were founded by a merger of Associazione Calcio Andrea Doria and Sampierdarenese in 1946 and would groundshare at Stadio Luigi Ferraris.

=== Post-war period ===
Genoa side during 1956–57 season

After the Second World War the ability of Genoa to finish in the upper ranks of Serie A declined in a significant manner; throughout the rest of the 1940s the club were middle-table finishers. The 1948–49 season saw three highly significant results, Genoa beat Inter 4–1, the famous Grande Torino side 3–0 and Padova 7–1. The 1950s started in poor fashion for the club, they had bought Argentine Mario Boyé from Boca Juniors but he stayed only one season and the club were relegated after finishing bottom of the table, but after two seasons they achieved their return after winning Serie B, ahead of Legnano. Ragnar Nikolay Larsen was a notable player for the club during this period and they sustained mid-table finishes for the rest of the decade.

Despite suffering a relegation in 1959–60 and then a promotion back up to Serie A in 1961–62, Genoa had a respectable amount of cup success in the first half of the 1960s. The club won the Coppa delle Alpi in 1962; it was the first time the competition had been competed between club teams instead of international ones, the final was played at home while Genoa beat French club Grenoble Foot 38 by 1–0 with a goal from Nizza. Genoa won the same competition again two years later, the final was held at the Wankdorf Stadium in Bern, Switzerland; Genoa defeated Catania 2–0, with both goals from Giampaolo Piaceri to take the trophy.

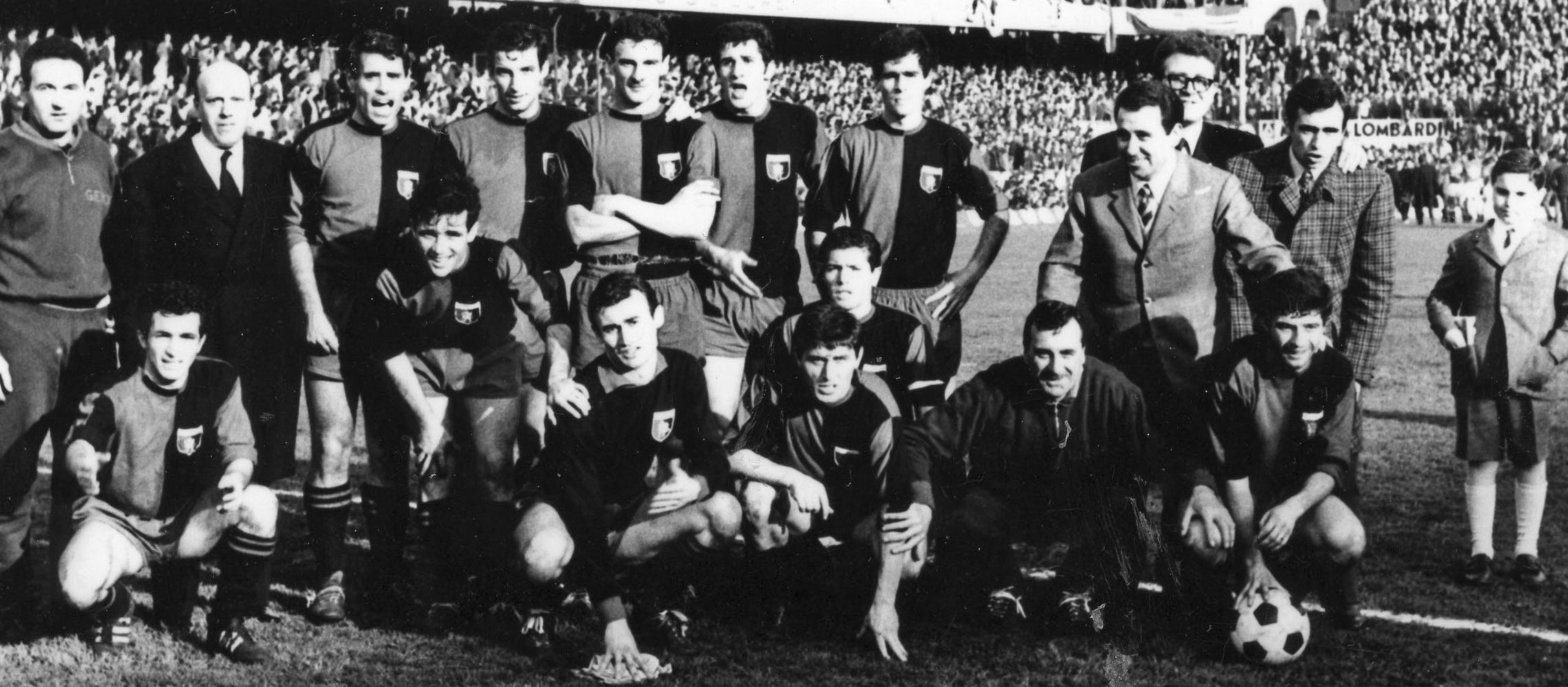
1962 Cup of the Alps triumph

The celebrations for the club did not last long however, as the year following their last cup success they were relegated down to Serie B again. This time their stay in the second tier of the Italian football league system would be far longer than previous relegations, the club was unstable as it changed manager each season. Genoa even experienced their first relegation to Serie C in 1970, financially the club fell into difficulties and had several ownership changes.

=== Mixed times ===
Throughout the 1970s, Genoa would mostly play in the second tier. Under the management of Arturo Silvestri the club made its way back to Serie A for the 1973–74 season, but they were relegated straight back down. For the return of Il Grifone to Serie A a couple of seasons later, the squad featured the likes of Roberto Rosato, Bruno Conti and a young Roberto Pruzzo. This time they stuck it out in the top division for two seasons before succumbing to relegation in 1977–78; the relegation was particularly cruel as the side above them Fiorentina survived on goal-difference of just a single goal, the two teams had played each other on the final day of the season ending in a 0–0 draw.

First Genoa side of the 1980s

The relegation was bad for the club in more ways than one, they lost some of their top players who could have offered them a swift return; such as Roberto Pruzzo's move to Roma where he would go on to have great success. After a couple of middle-table finishes in Serie B, Genoa earned promotion during the 1980–81 season under manager Luigi Simoni, the club finished as runners-up behind only AC Milan who had been relegated the previous season for their part in the Totonero betting scandal.

Still with Simoni at the helm as manager, Genoa were able to survive in Serie A for their returning season, finishing just one point ahead of the relegated AC Milan. In a dramatic last day of the season, Genoa were trailing 2–1 to Napoli with five minutes left, until on the 85th minute Mario Faccenda scored the goal that secured the point needed by Genoa, starting an owing friendship between the two club's fans. A couple of seasons later in 1983–84, Genoa would not be so lucky, despite beating champions Juventus on the final day of the season, the club were relegated even though they finished the season with the same number of points as surviving Lazio; this was because Lazio had recorded better results in matches against Genoa.

=== European experience ===
The club was purchased by Calabrese entrepreneur Aldo Spinelli in 1985 and despite no longer having Simoni as manager, Genoa were finishing in the top half of Serie B. After a slip in form during 1987–88 (failing to be promoted by a mere point in 1986–87, then having to struggle not to be retroceded the following season, being spared that fate again by a mere point), Genoa refocused their energy and were able to achieve promotion back into Serie A in 1988–89, finishing as champions ahead of Bari. Genoa, with an experienced trainer as Osvaldo Bagnoli who knew how to get the best out of underdog teams (he managed to win a championship at the helm of Hellas Verona in the eighties) and with a team sporting the talents of Carlos Aguilera and Tomáš Skuhravý among others achieved highs during the 1990–91 season where they finished fourth, remaining undefeated at home for the entire campaign, winning games against all the big sides including Juventus, Inter, Milan, Roma, Lazio, Fiorentina, Napoli, as well as their local rivals Sampdoria who won the title that season.

Subsequently, the club gained entry to the UEFA Cup in the 1991–92 season. Genoa had a good run, making it to the semi-finals before being knocked out by Ajax, that season's winners of the competition; notably Genoa did the double over Liverpool in the quarter-finals, becoming the first Italian side to beat the Reds at Anfield. Unfortunately for Genoa, this success was soon followed by a 'Dark Age' following the departure of Osvaldo Bagnoli (who chose to move away from Genoa to spend more time with his daughter, whose health was rapidly declining) and the failure of the management to replace key players as they grew old or were ceded to other teams. Noted Genoa players during this period included Gianluca Signorini, Carlos Aguilera, Stefano Eranio, Roberto Onorati and John van 't Schip.
Chairman Spinelli had a very different management approach from that of most businessmen turned football club owners. While his colleagues saw football as a marketing and public relation investment and were quite ready to siphon funds out of their main business to keep their teams afloat and replenish their player roster Spinelli saw Genoa as another business whose main aim was that of generating revenue for its owner (namely, himself) and so was more than happy to sell esteemed players for hefty revenues of which just a minimal fraction was then re-invested in the team, often for the acquisition of lesser-valued replacements or virtual unknowns. Thus he proved all-too-eager to sell Uruguayan striker Carlos Aguilera and to replace him with the markedly inferior Kazuyoshi Miura from Japanese side Yomiuri Verdy (a deal that especially pleased him since the Japanese sponsors were actually paying him to let Miura play in Serie A). The same season as their UEFA Cup run, they finished just one place above the relegation zone; in the seasons following Genoa remained in the lower half of the table.

During the 1994–95 season, Genoa were narrowly relegated; they finished level on points with Padova after the normal season period. This meant a relegation play-out was to be played between the two in Florence. The game was tied 1–1 at full-time and went to a penalty shoot-out. Genoa eventually lost the shoot-out 5–4. While back down in Serie B, the club had another taste of international cup success when they became the final winners of the Anglo-Italian Cup by beating Port Vale 5–2 with Gennaro Ruotolo scoring a hat-trick. Chairman Spinelli sold Genoa in 1997, moving onto other clubs (Alessandria and, then Livorno). The late 1990s and early 2000s would be the most trying time in the history of the club, with constant managerial changes, a poor financial situation and little hope of gaining promotion, outside of a decent 6th-place finish in 1999–00. From 1997 until 2003, Genoa had a total of three different owners and four different chairmen, before the club was passed on to the toys and games tycoon from Irpinia, Enrico Preziosi, already chairman of Como, a football club he previously owned.

=== Recent times ===
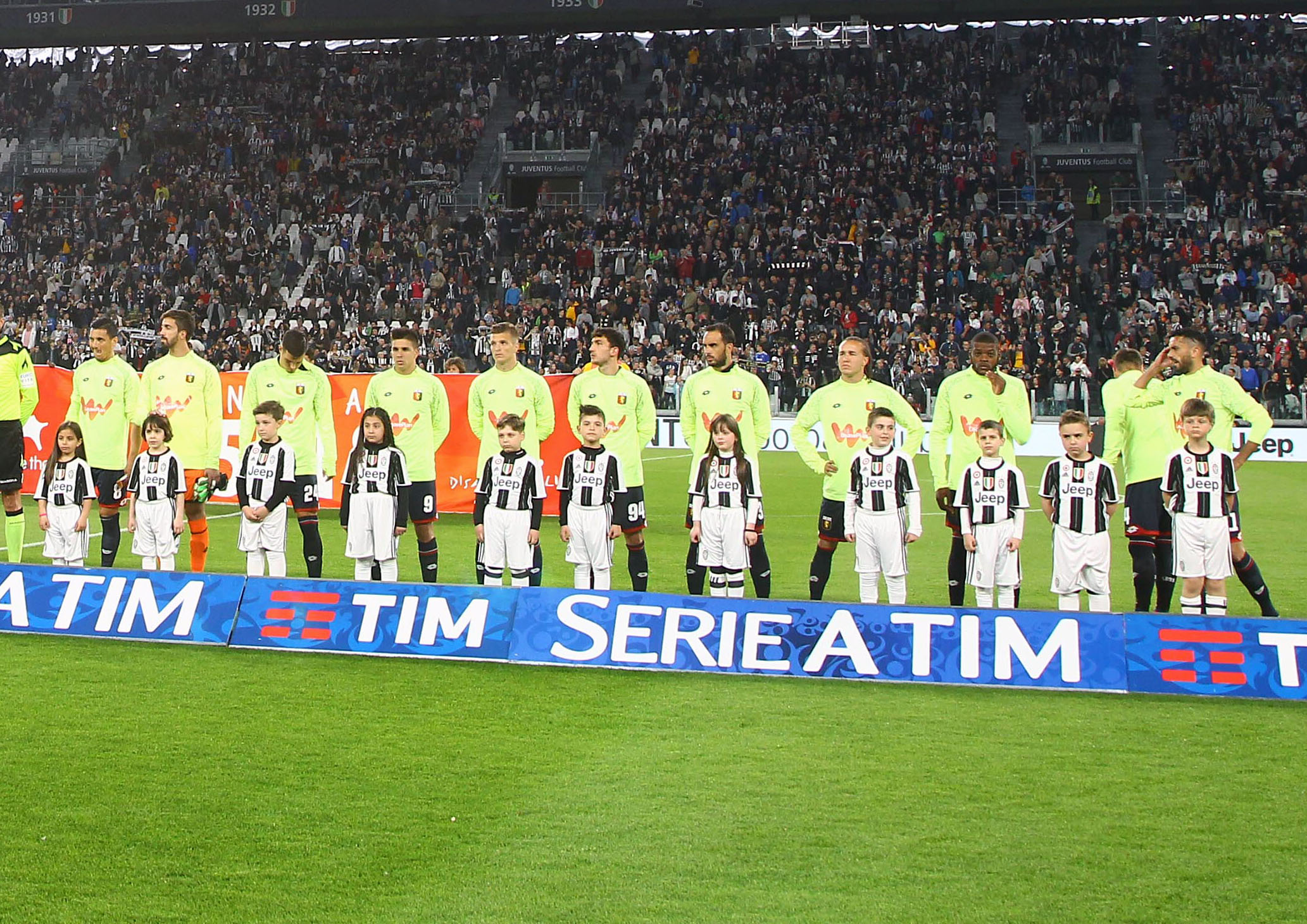
Genoa side during 2016–17 season

Preziosi took over in 2003, when Genoa should have been relegated to C1 series after a dismal season, but was instead "saved" along with Catania and Salernitana by the football federation's controversial decision to extend Serie B to 24 teams. Things started to look up for Genoa; they won Serie B in 2004–05. However, allegations were raised that the club had fixed a match on the last day of the season between themselves and Venezia. The 3–2 victory in the match saw Genoa win the league, with a draw having been good enough to maintain its position in the end. The Disciplinary Committee of FIGC saw fit to instead place Genoa bottom of the league and relegate them down to Serie C1 with a three-point deduction on 27 July 2005.

For their season in Serie C1 for 2005–06, Genoa were hit with a six-point penalty from the previous season. After leading for much of the season, they eventually finished as runners-up and were entered into the play-offs, beating Monza 2–1 on aggregate to achieve promotion back into Serie B. During the summer break Gian Piero Gasperini was brought in as the new manager, he helped the club to gain promotion during the 2006–07 season, it was ensured on the last day of the season where they drew a 0–0 with Napoli, both clubs were happily promoted back into Serie A.

The 2007–08 season, the first Serie A championship played by Genoa in 12 years, saw it finishing in a respectable tenth place, right after the "big ones" of Italian football.

A careful summer market session saw chairman, Preziosi strengthening the core of the team while parting from some players on favourable economical terms (for example selling striker Marco Borriello to AC Milan for a hefty sum). Genoa's aims for the 2008–09 season were set on a UEFA Cup spot. This was achieved after a strong season which saw the team finish fifth in Serie A, besting traditional powerhouses like Juventus, Roma, and Milan, and winning both Genoa derbies against Sampdoria, with Diego Milito finishing among the top scorers of the championship. Genoa subsequently lost Milito and midfielder Thiago Motta to Internazionale, but were able to bring in striker Hernán Crespo. Things however did not go as planned, with the injury-plagued team eliminated in the early stages of the Europa League and Coppa Italia and falling to a ninth-place finish in Serie A in 2010.

In the 2010–11 season, Genoa, whose ranks had been revolutionised once again save for some long-serving players, struggled along in the mid-positions of the league; a slew of questionable results early in the season led chairman Preziosi to fire trainer Gian Piero Gasperini, who had led the team since the 2007–08 season, and to select Davide Ballardini as his successor. The newcomers, despite not securing memorable successes, kept the team steadily afloat in the "left part" of the ranking, managing to win two consecutive derby matches against rivals Sampdoria in December and May.

The 2011–12 and 2012–13 seasons saw Genoa place in 17th both times, one spot away from relegation to Serie B.

In the 2014–15 season, Genoa, in sixth place and set to qualify for the UEFA Europa League qualifying round, were denied a UEFA license because they filed paperwork late and because the Stadio Luigi Ferraris was not currently up to standard for UEFA competition. The spot was passed on to 7th placed Sampdoria.

This damaged Genoa's momentum, and Genoa coasted to an eleventh-place finish in the 2015–16 season. In 2016–17, Genoa avoided relegation in 16th-place, and once again finished mid-table in the 2017–18 season. In the 2018–19 season, Genoa mathematically avoided relegation from Serie A. They were tied on 38 points with Empoli, but Empoli went down due to Genoa's superior head-to-head record.

In the 2021–22 season, Genoa finished 19th in the league table to be relegated after fifteen years in top division. In the 2022–23 season, the club finished second in Serie B, to promote back to Serie A after one season. In the 2023–24 season, Genoa Football Club maintains its position in Serie A and is not facing relegation. The club continues to compete in Italy's top football league, demonstrating resilience and determination to stay at the highest level of Italian football.

In the 2025–26 season, Genoa gets off to a poor start, leading to the dismissal of Patrick Vieira, who had performed well the previous year. The arrival of the new coach, former world champion Daniele De Rossi, greatly benefits the team, which regains some stability, allowing them to secure their place in Serie A with relative ease. In football terms, the historic Genoa-Pisa rivalry is revived this year, and as tradition dictates, Genoa came out on top. In the first leg at Marassi, the match ended in a 1-1 draw, with Colombo opening the scoring at the 15th minute and Léris equalizing for Pisa at the 38th minute. In the return match in Pisa, after Canestrelli gave Pisa an early lead at the 19th minute, Ekhator responded for Genoa at the 41st minute, and Colombo scored the winning goal at the 55th minute. The season also saw the confirmation with good performances of Lorenzo Colombo, a young talent from the AC Milan Youth Sector.

== Players ==
=== Current squad ===
As of 8 October 2026

Note: Flags indicate national team as defined under FIFA eligibility rules; some limited exceptions apply. Players may hold more than one non-FIFA nationality.

No.	Pos.	Nation	Player
1	GK	NED	Justin Bijlow
2	DF	ALB	Mario Mitaj (on loan from Al-Ittihad)
3	DF	NED	Kingsley Ehizibue
4	MF	BRA	Alex Amorim
5	DF	NOR	Leo Østigård
8	MF	ITA	Tommaso Baldanzi (on loan from Roma)
9	FW	POR	Vitinha
10	FW	BRA	Júnior Messias
11	MF	SUI	Ethan Meichtry
16	DF	ENG	Cody Drameh
17	FW	AUT	Elias Havel
18	FW	MNE	Milutin Osmajić
19	FW	ALB	Joi Nuredini
20	DF	ITA	Stefano Sabelli

No.	Pos.	Nation	Player
22	DF	MEX	Johan Vásquez (captain)
25	MF	CIV	Hamed Traorè (on loan from Marseille)
27	DF	ITA	Alessandro Marcandalli
29	FW	ITA	Lorenzo Colombo
31	DF	AUT	David Puczka
32	MF	DEN	Morten Frendrup
34	DF	DEN	Sebastian Otoa
39	GK	ITA	Daniele Sommariva
71	MF	ITA	Samuel Wiafe
76	FW	ITA	Lorenzo Venturino
77	MF	ISL	Mikael Egill Ellertsson
92	FW	ITA	Stephan El Shaarawy
97	MF	SUI	Djibril Sow
99	GK	AUT	Franz Stolz

=== Primavera ===
Note: Flags indicate national team as defined under FIFA eligibility rules; some limited exceptions apply. Players may hold more than one non-FIFA nationality.

No.	Pos.	Nation	Player
14	DF	LTU	Lukas Klišys
21	FW	BRA	Robinho Júnior (on loan from Santos)
74	DF	FRA	Mamedi Doucouré

No.	Pos.	Nation	Player
75	MF	FRA	Gaël Lafont
85	DF	GBS	Marcelo Vaz
93	GK	LAT	Rendijs Mihelsons

=== Out on loan ===
As of 16 September 2026

Note: Flags indicate national team as defined under FIFA eligibility rules; some limited exceptions apply. Players may hold more than one non-FIFA nationality.

No.	Pos.	Nation	Player
—	GK	ITA	Simone Calvani (at Vado until 30 June 2027)
—	GK	LTU	Ernestas Lysionok (at Dolomiti Bellunesi until 30 June 2027)
—	DF	ITA	Gabriele Calvani (at Frosinone until 30 June 2027)
—	DF	ITA	Lorenzo Gagliardi (at Team Altamura until 30 June 2027)
—	DF	ITA	Edoardo Meconi (at Gubbio until 30 June 2027)
—	DF	BFA	Latif Ouedraogo (at Rapid București until 30 June 2027)
—	DF	ITA	Tommaso Pittino (at Livorno until 30 June 2027)
—	DF	ITA	Gianluca Rossi (at Treviso until 30 June 2027)

No.	Pos.	Nation	Player
—	MF	BFA	Chec Bebel Doumbia (at Rapid București until 30 June 2027)
—	MF	ITA	Patrizio Masini (at Frosinone until 30 June 2027)
—	FW	PAR	Hugo Cuenca (at Celta Vigo B until 30 June 2027)
—	FW	ITA	Alessandro Debenedetti (at Cesena until 30 June 2027)
—	FW	ITA	Seydou Fini (at Frosinone until 30 June 2027)
—	FW	ITA	Gabriele Pessolani (at Crema until 30 June 2027)
—	FW	SVK	Adam Žulevič (at Iraklis until 30 June 2027)

=== Retired numbers ===
- 6 – (Italy) Gianluca Signorini, sweeper, 1988–95 (Note: The retirement could not be observed during the 2005–06 season because Serie C1 sides must use traditional 1 to 11 numbers.)
- 7 – (Italy) Marco Rossi, midfielder, 2003–04, 2005–13
- 12 – The fans of Gradinata Nord, "the twelfth man"

== Chairmen history ==
Below is the chairmen (Italian: presidenti, lit. 'presidents' or Italian: presidenti del consiglio di amministrazione, lit. 'chairmen of the board of directors') history of Genoa, from when the club was first founded playing cricket and athletics, until the present day.

Name	Years
(England) Charles De Grave Sells	1893–97
(Italy) Hermann Bauer	1897–99
(England) Daniel G. Fawcus	1899–1904
(Italy) Edoardo Pasteur	1904–09
(Italy) Vieri Arnaldo Goetzlof	1909–10
(Italy) Edoardo Pasteur	1910–11
(Italy) Luigi Aicardi	1911–13
(Italy) George Davidson	1913–20
(Italy) Guido Sanguineti	1920–26
(Italy) Vincent Ardissone	1926–33
(Italy) Alessandro Tarabini	1933–34
(Italy) Alfredo Costa	1934–36
(Argentina) Juan Culiolo	1936–41
(Italy) Giovanni Battista Bertoni	1941–42

Name	Years
(Italy) Giovanni Gavarone	1942–43
(Italy) Giovanni Battista Bertoni	1943–44
(Italy) Aldo Mairano	1944–45
(Italy) Antonio Lorenzo	1945–46
(Italy) Edoardo Pasteur	1946
(Italy) Giovanni Peragallo	1946
(Italy) Massimo Poggi	1946–50
(Italy) Ernesto Cauvin	1951–53
(Italy) Ugo Valperga	1953–54
(Italy) Presidential Committee	1954–58
(Italy) Fausto Gadolla	1958–60
(Italy) Presidential Committee	1960–63
(Italy) Giacomo Berrino	1963–66
(Italy) Ugo Maria Failla	1966–67

Name	Years
(Italy) Renzo Fossati	1967–70
(Italy) Virgilio Bazzani	1970
(Italy) Angelo Tongiani	1970–71
(Italy) Gianni Meneghini	1971–72
(Italy) Giacomo Berrino	1972–74
(Italy) Renzo Fossati	1974–85
(Italy) Aldo Spinelli	1985–97
(Italy) Massimo Mauro	1997–99
(Italy) Gianni Scerni	1999–2001
(Italy) Luigi Dalla Costa	2001–02
(Italy) Nicola Canal	2002–03
(Italy) Stefano Campoccia	2003
(Italy) Enrico Preziosi	2003–2021
(Italy) Alberto Zangrillo	2021–

== Coaching staff ==
Position	Name
Head coach	(Italy) Daniele De Rossi
Assistant coach	(Uruguay) Guillermo Giacomazzi
Technical assistant	(Italy) Emanuele Mancini (Italy) Roberto Murgita (Italy) Enrico Iodice
Goalkeeper coach	(Italy) Alessio Scarpi (Italy) Stefano Raggio Garibaldi
Performance manager	(Italy) Paolo Bertelli
Athletic coach	(Italy) Gaspare Picone (Italy) Francesco Rolli (Italy) Gianni Brignardello
Match analyst	(Italy) Mirco Vecchi (Italy) Francesco Checcucci
Head of medical	(Italy) Alessandro Corsini
Club doctor	(Italy) Marco Stellatelli
Medical director physiotherapy	(Italy) Matteo Perasso
Physiotherapist	(Italy) Federico Campofiorito (Italy) Pietro Cistaro (Italy) Luca Vergani

== Managerial history ==
Genoa have had many managers and trainers, some seasons they have had co-managers running the team, here is a chronological list of them from 1896 when they became a football club, onwards.

Name	Years
Technical Commission	1893–1896
James Richardson Spensley	1896–1907
Technical Commission	1907–1912
William Garbutt	1912–1927
Renzo De Vecchi	1927–1930
Géza Székány	1930–1931
Luigi Burlando; Guillermo Stábile	1931–1932
Karl Rumbold	1932–1933
József Nagy	1933–1934
Vittorio Faroppa then Renzo De Vecchi	1934–1935
György Orth	1935–1936
Hermann Felsner	1936–1937
William Garbutt	1937–1939
Ottavio Barbieri; William Garbutt	1939–1940
Ottavio Barbieri	1940–1941
Guido Ara	1941–1943
Ottavio Barbieri then József Viola	1945–1946
William Garbutt	1946–1948
Federico Allasio	1948–1949
David John Astley then David John Astley and Federico Allasio then Manlio Bacigalupo	1949–1950
Manlio Bacigalupo	1950–1951
Imre Senkey then Valentino Sala and Giacinto Ellena	1951–1952
Giacinto Ellena	1952–1953
György Sárosi then Ermelindo Bonilauri	1953–1955
Renzo Magli	1955–1958
Annibale Frossi	1958–1959
Antonio Busini; Gipo Poggi then Jesse Carver then Annibale Frossi	1959–1960
Annibale Frossi	1960–1961
Renato Gei	1961–1963
Beniamino Santos	1963–1964
Paulo Amaral then Roberto Lerici	1964–1965
Luigi Bonizzoni	1965–1966
Giorgio Ghezzi then Paolo Tabanelli	1966–1967
Livio Fongaro then Aldo Campatelli	1967–1968
Aldo Campatelli then Aldo Campatelli and Maurizio Bruno	1968–1969
Franco Viviani then Maurizio Bruno and Ermelindo Bonilauri then Aredio Gimona and Ermelindo Bonilauri	1969–1970
Arturo Silvestri	1970–1974
Guido Vincenzi	1974–1975
Gigi Simoni	1975–1978
Pietro Maroso then Ettore Puricelli then Gianni Bui	1978–1979
Gianni Di Marzio	1979–1980
Gigi Simoni	1980–1984
Tarcisio Burgnich	1984–1986
Attilio Perotti	1986–1987

Name	Years
Gigi Simoni then Attilio Perotti	1987–1988
Franco Scoglio	1988–1990
Osvaldo Bagnoli	1990–1992
Bruno Giorgi then Luigi Maifredi then Claudio Maselli	1992–1993
Claudio Maselli then Franco Scoglio	1993–1994
Franco Scoglio then Giuseppe Marchioro then Claudio Maselli	1994–1995
Gigi Radice then Gaetano Salvemini	1995–1996
Attilio Perotti	1996–1997
Gaetano Salvemini	1997
Claudio Maselli	1997
Tarcisio Burgnich	1997–1998
Giuseppe Pillon	1998
Luigi Cagni	1998–1999
Delio Rossi	1999–2000
Bruno Bolchi	2000
Guido Carboni; Alfredo Magni	2000
Bruno Bolchi	2001
Claudio Onofri	2001
Franco Scoglio	2001
Edoardo Reja	2001–2002
Claudio Onofri	2002
Vincenzo Torrente; Rino Lavezzini	2002–2003
Roberto Donadoni	2003
Luigi De Canio	2003
Serse Cosmi	2004–2005
Francesco Guidolin	2005
Giovanni Vavassori then Attilio Perotti then Giovanni Vavassori	2005–2006
Gian Piero Gasperini	2006–2010
Davide Ballardini	2010–2011
Alberto Malesani	2011
Pasquale Marino	2011–2012
Alberto Malesani	2012
Luigi De Canio	2012
Luigi Delneri	2012–2013
Davide Ballardini	2013
Fabio Liverani	2013
Gian Piero Gasperini	2013–2016
Ivan Jurić	2016–2017
Andrea Mandorlini	2017
Ivan Jurić	2017
Davide Ballardini	2017–2018
Ivan Jurić	2018
Cesare Prandelli	2018–19
Aurelio Andreazzoli	2019
Thiago Motta	2019
Davide Nicola	2019–2020
Rolando Maran	2020
Davide Ballardini	2020–2021
Andriy Shevchenko	2021–2022
Alexander Blessin	2022
Alberto Gilardino	2022–2024
Patrick Vieira	2024–2025
Daniele De Rossi	2025–present

== Colours, badge and nicknames ==
As Genoa was a British-run club, the first ever colours were those of the Cricket section of the club. Not long into the club's footballing history, the kit was changed to white and blue stripes in 1899. In 1901 the club finally settled for their most famous red and blue halves shirt, this gained them the nickname of rossoblù.

One of the nicknames of Genoa is Il Grifone which means "the griffin"; this is derived from the coat of arms belonging to the city of Genoa. The coat of arms features two golden griffins, either side of the Saint George's Cross. The actual club badge of Genoa Cricket and Football Club is heavily derived from the city coat of arms, but also incorporated the club's red and blue colours.

== Supporters and rivalries ==
Genoa CFC has the bulk of its fans in Liguria, however they are also popular in Piedmont and the Aosta Valley. The seafaring traditions of the Genoese and the presence of Genoese communities in distant countries did much to spread the appeal of Genoa some further than just Italy, and immigrants founded fan clubs in Buenos Aires, Amsterdam, Tokyo, Toronto, New York, San Francisco, Barcelona, Iceland and other places.

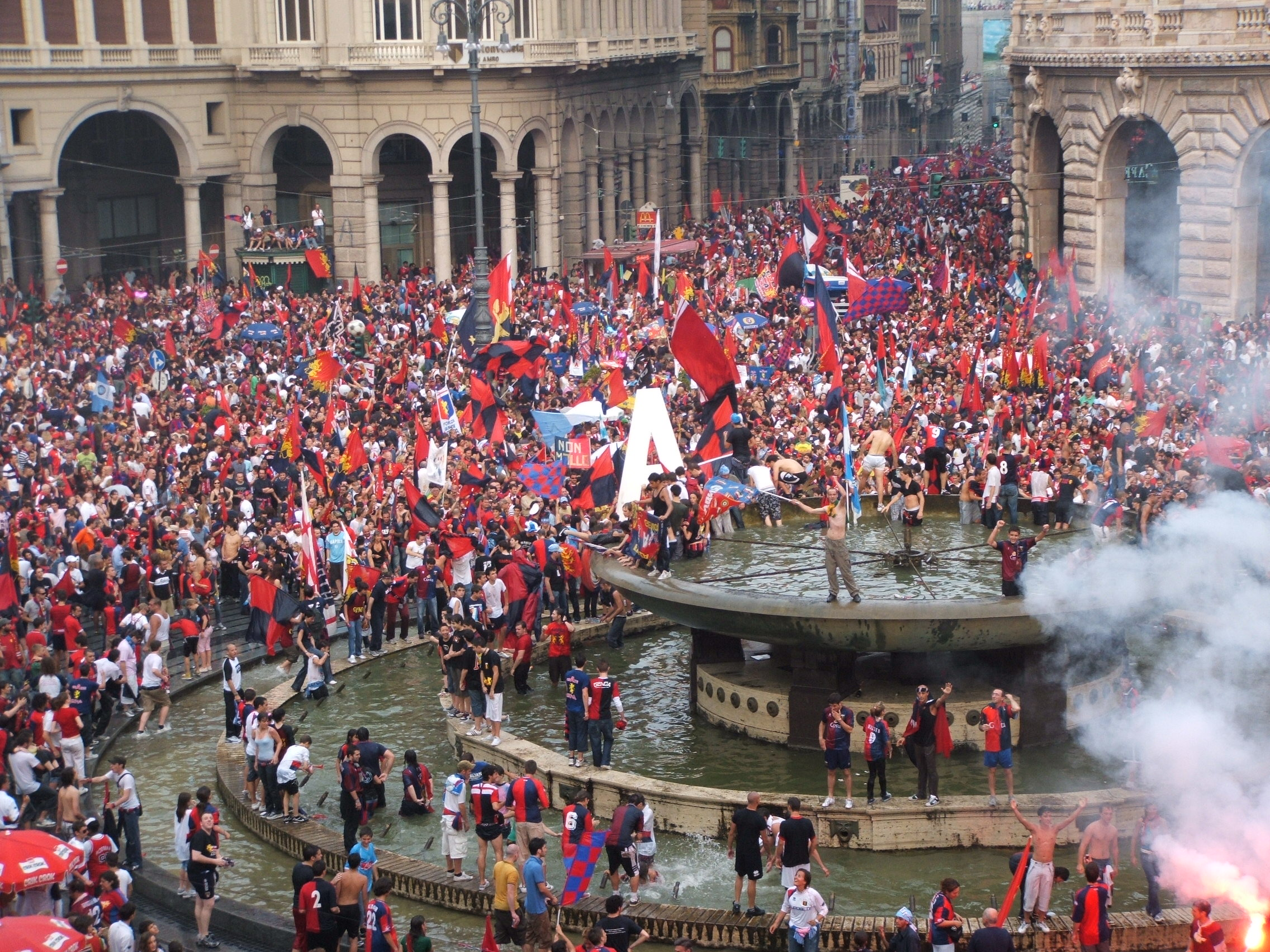
Genoa fans in June 2007 at Piazza de Ferrari, celebrating their return to Serie A.

The most significant and traditional rivalry for Genoa, is the inner-city one with the club with whom they share a ground; Sampdoria. The two clubs compete together in the heated Derby della Lanterna ("Derby of the Lantern"); a reference to the Lighthouse of Genoa. Genoa's supporters also have a strong distaste for AC Milan. A clash between opposing supporters in January 1995 resulted in the death of Genoese Vincenzo Spagnolo, who was stabbed to death by Milanese Simone Barbaglia. The assailant was a member of an informal group of football hooligans dubbed "The Barbour Ones", who used to routinely carry bladed weapons to matches, a practice made possible by the relaxed security measures of the time.

Conversely, the fans of Genoa have long standing friendships with Napoli (which goes back to the 1982 last match of the season). On the last day of the 2006–07 season, Genoa and Napoli drew a practical 0–0 ensuring both were promoted back into Serie A; Genoa ultras could be seen holding up banners saying "Benvenuto fratello napoletano", meaning, "Welcome, Neapolitan brother", and the two sets of fans celebrated together.

On the other hand, the amicable relationship with the red-and-yellow supporters of Roma, fostered by the cession of striker Roberto Pruzzo in 1979 and lasting for most of the 80's has, in recent years, cooled up a bit while another strong fraternity, which saw Genoese football fans on friendly terms with Torino (since the exchange of Gigi Meroni between the two clubs at the end of the 1963–64 season and his untimely death on 15 October 1967) has perhaps broken-down for good after the Torino-Genoa match of season 2008–09.

Starved for points and risking a humiliating relegation (one of many in a troubled recent history) the Turinese fans expected a friendly treatment from Genoa, which, in the heat of a pitched battle with Fiorentina for the fourth place (which could have won a Champions League spot for the team) did not comply, soundly beating Torino and to many effects sealing its fate. When during early August 2009 Genoa scheduled a friendly match with Nice in southern Piedmont, many Turinese hooligans travelled to the match location with the precise intention of starting trouble and disorder to "get even" with Genoa and its fans.

== Ownership and structure ==
=== 777 Partners ===
On 23 September 2021, it was announced that Genoa had been acquired by 777 Partners, a US-based private investment firm founded by Steven W. Pasko and Josh Wander. While terms were not publicly released, sources close to the deal revealed that the team was acquired for its enterprise value of $175 million. Despite being relegated to Serie B in their very first season under 777 Partners ownership, Genoa immediately made it back to Serie A the following year.

=== Cricket ===
Early on, the club transformed from a multi-sport club to one exclusively focused on football. In 2007, a group of club supporters formed a section dedicated to cricket. It currently competes under the name Genoa Cricket Club 1893 in Serie A of the Italian cricket league.

== In Europe ==
=== UEFA Cup/Europa League ===
Season	Round	Opponent	Home	Away	Aggregate
1991–92	First round	(Spain) Oviedo	3–1	0–1	3–2
1991–92	Second round	(Romania) Dinamo București	3–1	2–2	5–3
1991–92	Third round	(Romania) Steaua București	1–0	1–0	2–0
1991–92	Quarter-finals	(England) Liverpool	2–0	2–1	4–1
1991–92	Semi-finals	(Netherlands) Ajax	2–3	1–1	3–4
2009–10
2009–10	Play-off round	(Denmark) Odense	3–1	1–1	4–2
2009–10	Group B	(Spain) Valencia	1–2	2–3	3rd
2009–10	Group B	(France) Lille	3–2	0–3	3rd
2009–10	Group B	(Czech Republic) Slavia Prague	2–0	0–0	3rd

== Honours ==
=== League ===
- Italian Football Championship / Northern League / Serie A:
  - Winners (9): 1898, 1899, 1900, 1902, 1903, 1904, 1914–15, 1922–23, 1923–24
- Serie B:
  - Winners (6): 1934–35, 1952–53, 1961–62, 1972–73, 1975–76, 1988–89
- Serie C / Serie C1 (North):
  - Winners (1): 1970–71

=== Cups ===
- Coppa Italia: 1
  - Winners: 1936–37
  - Runners-up: 1939–40

=== Other Titles ===
- Coppa delle Alpi: 2
  - Winners: 1962, 1964
- Anglo-Italian Cup: 1
  - Winners: 1996

=== Youth titles ===
- Campionato Nazionale Primavera: 1
  - Winners: 2009–10
- Coppa Italia Primavera: 1

- Winners: 2008–09

- Primavera Super Cup: 2
  - Winners: 2009, 2010
- Torneo di Viareggio: 2

- Winners: 1965, 2007

- Campionato Nazionale Under-18: 2
  - Winners: 2020–21, 2023–24
- Campionato Nazionale Under-17:
  - Runners-up: 2020–21
- Campionato Nazionale giovanile: 2
  - Winners: 1939, 1942

== Divisional movements ==
Series	Years	Last	Promotions	Relegations
A	59	2026–27	–	▼9 (1934, 1951, 1960, 1965, 1974, 1978, 1984, 1995, 2022)
B	34	2022–23	▲9 (1935, 1953, 1962, 1973, 1976, 1981, 1989, 2007, 2023)	▼2 (1970, 2005)
C	2	2005–06	▲2 (1971, 2006)	never
95 years of professional football in Italy
Founding member of the Football League's First Division in 1921

The total from 1897–98 includes 107 seasons at a national level from the inception of the Italian football league, including 27 seasons of Prima Categoria and Prima Divisione (from 1898 to 1922 the name of the Italian Football Championship was Prima Categoria). Seasons included Prima Categoria 1907–1908, where Genoa didn't enter the tournament.

== Kit suppliers and shirt sponsors ==
Period	Kit manufacturer	Shirt sponsor (main)	Shirt sponsor (secondary)	Shirt sponsor (back)	Shirt sponsor (sleeve)	Shorts sponsor
1978–1980	Puma	None	None	None	None	None
1980–1981	Mauri Sport	None	None	None	None	None
1981–1982	Mauri Sport	Seiko	None	None	None	None
1982–1983	Adidas	Seiko	None	None	None	None
1983–1984	Adidas	Elah	None	None	None	None
1984–1985	Adidas	Carrera Jeans	None	None	None	None
1985–1988	Adidas	Levante Assicurazioni	None	None	None	None
1988–1989	Erreà	Levante Assicurazioni	None	None	None	None
1989–1992	Erreà	Mita	None	None	None	None
1992–1994	Erreà	Saiwa	None	None	None	None
1994–1995	Erreà	Kenwood	None	None	None	None
1995–1996	Erreà	Giocheria	None	None	None	None
1996–1997	Erreà	Santàl	None	None	None	None
1997–1998	Erreà	Costa Crociere	None	None	None	None
1998–2000	Kappa	Festival Crociere	None	None	None	None
2000–2001	Kappa	None	None	None	None	None
2001–2002	Erreà	None	None	None	None	None
2002–2005	Erreà	Costa Crociere	None	None	None	None
2005–2006	Erreà	Compex	None	None	None	None
2006–2007	Erreà	Eurobet	None	None	None	None
2007–2008	Erreà	Eurobet	None	None	None	None
2008–2009	Asics	Eurobet	None	None	None	None
2009–2010	Asics	Gaudì Fashion	None	None	None	None
2010–2012	Asics	iZi Play	None	None	None	None
2012–2014	Lotto	iZi Play	None	None	None	None
2014–2015	Lotto	DF Sport Specialist	McVitie's	None	None	None
2015–2016	Lotto	None	AT.P.CO	LeasePlan	None	None
2016–2017	Lotto	Prénatal (Matchday 2, 9-18) / Eviva Energia (19-38)	Syneasy (Home) / Zentiva (Away)	LeasePlan	None	None
2017–2018	Lotto	Eviva Energia	Zentiva	LeasePlan	None	None
2018–2019	Lotto	Giocheria	Zentiva	LeasePlan	None	None
2019–2020	Kappa	None	Zentiva	LeasePlan	None	None
2020–2021	Kappa	Banca Sistema	None	LeasePlan	Synlab	None
2021–2022	Kappa	MG.K Vis	LaMiaLiguria	LeasePlan	Synlab	None
2022–2023	Castore	Radio 105	MSC Cruises	LeasePlan	None	Portofino Mare (Home) / Portofino Yacht Marina (Away) / Castello Brown (Third)
2023–2024	Kappa	Pulsee Luce e Gas	MSC Cruises	LeasePlan (Home) (Matchday 1-33) / ALD Automotive (Away) (1-33) / Ayvens (33-38)	Radio 105	None
2024–2025	Kappa	Pulsee Luce e Gas	Squid Game 2 / Ceres c'è	MSC Cruises	Cepsa / Netflix / Ceres c'è	None
2025–2026	Kappa	Pulsee Luce e Gas	Rolling Stone	None	Ceres c'è	None

== See also ==
- Sports dynasty
- Club of Pioneers
- Genoa CFC Women
- Scudetto of the Pistols

== Bibliography ==
- La leggenda genoana. Genova: De Ferrari. 2006–2007.
- Sotto il segno del Grifone. Genova: Fratelli Frilli Editori. 2005.
- Santina Barrovecchio (2002). Genoa – La nostra favola. Milano: MD Edizioni. ISBN 88-89370-03-3.
- Gianni Brera (2005). Caro Vecchio Balordo. Genova: De Ferrari.
- Gianni Brera & Franco Tomati (1992). Genoa, amore mio. Milano: Ponte alle Grazie.
- Tonino Cagnucci (2013). Il Grifone fragile. Lìmina: Brezzo di Bedero.
- Manlio Fantini (1977). FC Genoa: ieri, oggi, domani. Firenze: Edi-Grafica.
- Alberto Isola (2003). Più mi tradisci Più ti amo. Genova: Fratelli Frilli Editori.
- Carlo Isola e Alberto Isola (2007). Dizionario del Genoano – amoroso e furioso. Genova: De Ferrari.
- Giancarlo Rizzoglio. La grande storia del Genoa. Genova: Nuova Editrice Genovese.
- Renzo Parodi e Giulio Vignolo (1991). Genoa. Genova: Il Secolo XIX.
- Dizionario illustrato dei giocatori genoani. Genova: De Ferrari. 2008. ISBN 978-88-6405-011-9.
- Aldo Padovano (2005). Accadde domani... un anno con il Genoa. Genova: De Ferrari. ISBN 88-7172-689-8.
- Gianluca Maiorca (2011). Almanacco storico del Genoa. Trebaseleghe: Fratelli Frilli Editori. ISBN 978-88-7563-693-7.
