= 1922–23 Prima Divisione =

22nd season of top-tier Italian football

Prima Divisione
- Season: 1922–23
- Champions: Genoa; 8th title
- Relegated: Mantova; US Torinese; Petrarca Padova; Speranza Savona; Derthona; Rivarolese; Esperia Como; Udinese; Lucchese; US Milanese; Pastore Torino; Savona

The 1922-23 Prima Divisione was the twenty-third edition of the Italian Football Championship and the second branded Prima Divisione. In a highly political previous season of Italian football, two separate and rival Italian Football Championships were organised by disputing parties. Hence why 1922-23 Prima Divisione was the twenty-third edition and not twenty-second. The 1922–23 Prima Divisione was the eighth Italian Football Championship won by Genoa.

== Format ==
All five seasons of Prima Divisione were scheduled as regional competitions, leading to a national final. Due to the high numbers of participants, under the agreement with the Northern League, the FIGC had to organize a qualification tournament in July, in order to reduce them to three rounds of 12 sides each.

=== Northern League ===
From 1921-22 C.C.I. championship

- Alessandria - Alessandria
- Andrea Doria - Genoa
- Bologna - Bologna
- Casale - Casale Monferrato
- Genoa - Genoa
- Hellas Verona - Verona
- Juventus - Turin
- Legnano - Legnano
- Mantova - Mantua
- Milan - Milan
- Modena - Modena
- Novara - Novara
- Padova - Padua
- Pisa - Pisa
- Pro Vercelli - Vercelli
- Savona - Savona
- Torino - Turin
- U.S. Milanese - Milan

From 1921-22 F.I.G.C. championship

- Cremonese - Cremona
- Esperia Como - Como
- Lucca - Lucca
- Novese - Novi Ligure
- Petrarca Padova - Padua
- Sampierdarenese - Genoa
- Spal - Ferrara
- Speranza Savona - Savona
- U.S. Torinese - Turin
- Udinese - Udine
- Virtus Bologna - Bologna

After qualification

- Brescia - Brescia (CCI)
- Derthona - Tortona (CCI 2nd division)
- Internazionale - Milan (CCI)
- Livorno - Livorno (CCI + *)
- Pastore Torino - Turin (FIGC)
- Rivarolese - Genoa (FIGC)
- Spezia - La Spezia (CCI)

(*) This side is the result of the merger of U.S. Livorno (CCI) and Pro Livorno (FIGC).

=== Southern League ===
All the teams were from 1921-22 C.C.I. championship

- Alba Roma - Rome
- Anconitana - Ancona
- Audace Taranto - Taranto
- Bagnolese - Naples
- Cavese - Cava de' Tirreni
- Fortitudo Roma - Rome
- Internaples - Naples (*)
- Juventus Audax - Rome
- Lazio - Rome
- Lecce - Lecce
- Libertas Palermo - Palermo (*)
- Liberty Bari - Bari
- Messina - Messina (*)
- Palermo - Palermo
- Pro Italia Taranto - Taranto
- Savoia - Torre Annunziata
- Stabia - Castellammare di Stabia
- U.S. Romana - Rome

After qualification

- Roman - Rome

New club

- Ideale Bari - Bari

(*) These sides were the results of various mergers:

- Internaples was the result of the merger of Internazionale Napoli and Naples.
- Libertas Palermo was the result of the merger of the old Libertas Palermo and Azzurra Palermo.
- Messina was the result of the merger of S.C. Messina and Messinese.

== Northern League ==
=== Regular season ===
Group winners went to the final phase. Four worst clubs of each group were relegated.

==== Group A ====
===== Classification =====
P	Team	Pld	W	D	L	GF	GA	GD	Pts	Promotion or relegation
1.	Pro Vercelli	22	17	2	3	49	14	+35	36	Qualified
2.	Torino	22	14	4	4	59	12	+47	32	
3.	Sampierdarenese	22	12	4	6	37	22	+15	28	
4.	Pisa	22	11	3	8	43	33	+10	25	
5.	Hellas Verona	22	9	6	7	29	26	+3	24	
6.	Casale	22	7	9	6	23	17	+6	23	
7.	Internazionale	22	8	5	9	33	37	-4	21	
7.	Virtus Bologna	22	8	5	9	15	22	-7	21	
9.	Mantova (R)	22	6	6	10	18	27	-9	18	Relegated
10.	US Torinese (R)	22	6	4	12	23	41	-18	16	Relegated
11.	PetrarcaPadova(R)	22	6	3	13	20	51	-31	15	Relegated
12.	SperanzaSavona(R)	22	0	5	17	10	57	-47	5	Relegated

===== Results table =====
Home \ Away	CAS	HEL	INT	MAN	PET	PIS	PRO	SAM	SPE	TOR	USN	VIR
Casale	—	3–0	1–0	1–0	4–0	0–0	0–1	0–0	3–0	1–1	1–0	2–0
Hellas Verona	1–1	—	0–2	2–0	2–1	1–2	0–0	1–1	3–1	1–0	3–0	1–0
Internazionale	1–1	3–2	—	2–3	4–0	2–0	1–5	4–2	3–0	2–2	1–0	0–2
Mantova	0–0	1–1	1–1	—	2–0	3–1	1–2	1–0	1–0	0–2	1–1	0–0
Petrarca Padova	2–2	2–3	3–1	1–0	—	2–1	0–6	0–0	2–1	0–2	3–1	1–2
Pisa	2–2	0–2	2–2	4–1	2–0	—	2–1	5–0	7–1	2–1	3–0	1–0
Pro Vercelli	3–0	2–1	1–0	1–0	2–0	3–1	—	1–0	3–0	2–1	5–0	1–1
Sampierdarenese	2–0	2–0	3–1	3–1	4–1	2–0	3–2	—	6–0	1–0	2–0	3–1
Speranza Savona	0–0	1–3	0–0	1–1	0–1	2–4	0–3	0–2	—	0–2	1–1	0–0
Torino	1–0	1–1	6–0	3–0	8–0	6–1	2–0	2–0	8–0	—	6–0	3–0
US Torinese	2–1	1–1	3–2	0–1	4–1	0–2	1–3	1–0	3–2	1–1	—	4–0
Virtus Bologna	1–0	2–0	0–1	1–0	0–0	2–1	0–2	1–1	1–0	0–1	1–0	—

Legend: Blue = home team win; Yellow = draw; Red = away team win.

==== Group B ====
===== Classification =====
P	Team	Pld	W	D	L	GF	GA	GD	Pts	Promotion or relegation
1.	Genoa	22	17	5	0	61	18	+43	39	Qualified
2.	Legnano	22	13	6	3	37	19	+18	32	
3.	Bologna	22	11	5	6	66	21	+45	27	
4.	Milan	22	8	10	4	32	28	4	26	
5.	Juventus	22	10	5	7	31	21	+10	25	
6.	Cremonese	22	10	4	8	28	25	+3	24	
6.	Modena	22	10	4	8	24	23	+1	24	
8.	Spezia	22	5	9	8	20	29	-9	19	Relegation tie-breaker
9.	Derthona (R)	22	6	7	9	29	31	-2	19	Relegation tie-breaker
10.	Rivarolese (R)	22	7	4	11	28	49	-21	18	Relegated
11.	EsperiaComo(R)	22	1	4	17	11	49	-38	6	Relegated
12.	Udinese (R)	22	1	3	18	14	68	-54	5	Relegated

===== Results table =====
Home \ Away	BOL	CRE	DER	ESP	GEN	JUV	LEG	MIL	MOD	RIV	SPE	UDI
Bologna	—	3–0	2–2	5–0	1–2	4–1	5–1	0–2	2–0	6–0	5–0	14–0
Cremonese	1–1	—	2–0	3–0	1–2	1–0	0–2	0–1	0–0	4–0	2–0	1–0
Derthona	1–1	0–2	—	3–1	1–3	1–2	1–1	0–0	1–0	3–1	0–1	5–0
Esperia Como	2–4	0–2	0–4	—	2–8	0–1	0–1	1–4	0–1	1–2	0–0	3–2
Genoa	2–1	2–0	4–1	0–0	—	2–1	1–1	4–1	3–2	5–1	1–1	6–0
Juventus	2–2	3–1	2–0	1–0	1–1	—	1–0	2–2	4–0	5–0	0–0	2–0
Legnano	1–0	4–0	1–1	2–0	1–1	3–2	—	1–1	3–0	3–2	2–1	3–1
Milan	0–8	2–1	1–1	1–1	1–3	0–0	1–0	—	1–0	4–0	0–0	1–1
Modena	2–0	1–1	1–0	2–0	1–2	1–0	0–0	1–1	—	3–1	2–0	2–0
Rivarolese	0–0	2–3	4–1	2–0	0–4	2–0	0–2	1–1	2–0	—	2–2	3–1
Spezia	2–1	0–1	1–1	0–0	0–4	1–0	0–2	2–1	2–3	0–0	—	5–0
Udinese	0–1	2–2	1–2	1–0	0–1	0–1	1–3	1–6	0–2	1–3	2–2	—

Legend: Blue = home team win; Yellow = draw; Red = away team win.

===== Relegation tie-breaker =====
Played on July 1, 1923, in Genoa.

Team 1	Score	Team 2
Derthona	0-0	Spezia

Tie-breaker
Played on July 8, 1923, in Genoa.

Team 1	Score	Team 2
Derthona	2-3	Spezia

==== Group C ====
===== Classification =====
P	Team	Pld	W	D	L	GF	GA	GD	Pts	Promotion or relegation
1.	Padova	22	14	4	4	48	22	+26	32	Qualification tie-breaker
2.	Alessandria	22	14	4	4	35	15	+20	32	Qualification tie-breaker
3.	Livorno	22	13	4	5	43	19	+24	30	
3.	SPAL	22	12	6	4	37	15	+22	30	
5.	Novara	22	12	2	8	41	24	+17	26	
6.	Andrea Doria	22	9	6	7	40	29	+11	24	
7.	Brescia	22	8	4	10	34	28	+6	20	
8.	Novese	22	5	9	8	26	32	-6	19	
9.	Lucchese (R)	22	6	4	12	24	55	-31	16	Relegated
10.	US Milanese (R)	22	3	8	11	23	43	-20	14	Relegated
11.	PastoreTorino (R)	22	4	3	15	16	53	-37	11	Relegated
12.	Savona (R)	22	3	4	15	14	46	-32	10	Relegated

===== Results table =====
Home \ Away	ALE	ADO	BRE	LIV	LUC	NOV	USN	PAD	PAS	SAV	SPA	USM
Alessandria	—	3–0	1–0	3–0	3–0	2–1	2–0	0–1	1–0	2–0	2–1	1–1
Andrea Doria	1–1	—	2–1	1–1	4–0	2–1	3–1	1–1	6–0	6–0	1–0	3–1
Brescia	1–1	0–0	—	2–1	4–0	2–0	3–1	1–2	2–0	1–0	2–2	4–0
Livorno	2–0	2–0	4–1	—	8–0	2–1	3–0	2–1	3–0	2–1	1–0	5–0
Lucchese	0–2	2–2	1–0	0–1	—	1–2	1–1	3–0	2–0	3–1	2–2	2–0
Novara	2–3	7–0	1–0	2–0	3–1	—	4–1	2–0	4–1	3–0	1–1	1–0
Novese	0–2	1–0	0–0	1–1	4–1	2–0	—	1–2	3–1	1–2	1–1	2–2
Padova	2–1	2–1	2–1	1–1	6–1	2–1	2–2	—	11–1	3–1	1–1	2–0
Pastore Torino	1–1	2–0	4–1	1–3	1–2	0–1	0–2	0–2	—	1–0	1–0	0–0
Savona	0–1	0–5	0–7	1–0	1–1	2–2	0–0	0–2	3–0	—	0–1	1–1
Spal	1–0	2–1	3–0	2–0	5–0	1–0	1–1	1–0	4–0	2–0	—	3–0
US Milanese	1–3	1–1	3–1	1–1	5–1	1–2	1–1	0–3	2–2	2–1	1–3	—

Legend: Blue = home team win; Yellow = draw; Red = away team win.

===== Promotion tie-breaker =====
Played on June 3, 1923, in Milan.

Team 1	Score	Team 2
Alessandria	1-2	Padova

Padova qualified for the Final Round.

=== Final round ===
==== Classification ====
P	Team	Pld	W	D	L	GF	GA	GD	Pts	Champions of Italy
1.	Genoa	4	3	1	0	8	2	+6	7	Qualified
2.	Pro Vercelli	4	1	1	2	5	5	0	3	
3.	Padova	4	1	0	3	4	10	-6	2	

==== Results table ====
Home \ Away	GEN	PAD	PRO
Genoa	—	3–1	1–0
Padova	0–3	—	3–1
Pro Vercelli	1–1	3–0	—

Legend: Blue = home team win; Yellow = draw; Red = away team win.

== Southern League ==
The Southern League was a separate amatorial league, still divided in five regions. The winner were Lazio Rome.

== National Finals ==
Team 1	Agg.	Team 2	1st leg	2nd leg
Genoa	6-1	Lazio	4-1	2-0

== References and sources ==
- Almanacco Illustrato del Calcio - La Storia 1898-2004, Panini Edizioni, Modena, September 2005
