= Mirko Pavinato =

Italian footballer and manager (1934–2021)

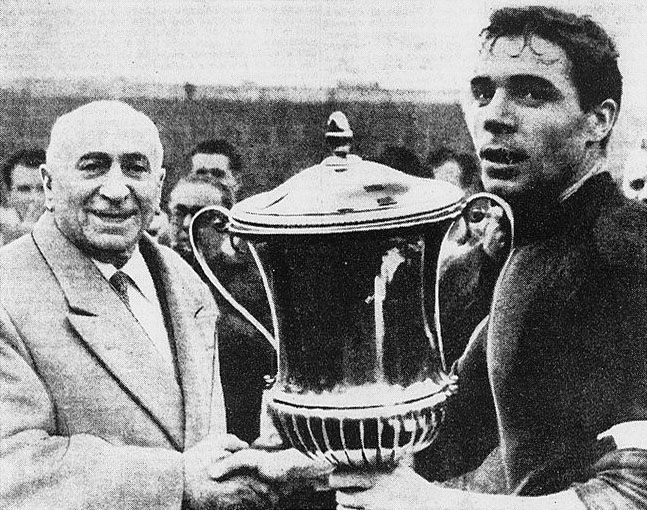
- President Renato Dall'Ara (left) and captain Mirko Pavinato (right) with the trophy of the 1961 Mitropa Cup

Personal information
- Date of birth: 20 June 1934
- Place of birth: Vicenza, Italy
- Date of death: 7 March 2021 (aged 86)
- Place of death: Bologna, Italy
- Height: 1.75 m (5 ft 9 in)
- Position: Defender

Youth career
- 19??–19??: Vicenza

Senior career*
| Years | Team | Apps | (Gls) |
| 1953–1956 | Lanerossi Vicenza | 61 | (0) |
| 1956–1966 | Bologna | 264 | (0) |
| 1966–1968 | Mantova | 54 | (0) |
| 1968–1970 | Progresso Castelmaggiore | 3 | (0) |
| Total | | 382 | (0) |

International career
| 1955–1956 | Italy B | 4 | (0) |

Managerial career
- 1971–1972: San Marino
- * Club domestic league appearances and goals

Mirko Pavinato (20 June 1934 – 7 March 2021) was an Italian football player and manager, who played as a defender.

== Club career ==
Pavinato grew up as a football player in the L.R. Vicenza, where with the "Primavera" team led by manager Umberto Menti he won the Torneo di Viareggio twice in a row, in 1954 and 1955.

He made his debut in the first team in the 1953–54 Serie B season, the first in which Vicenza played under the name of the sponsor Lanerossi. In that season he played only one game, the last of the league, on 30 May 1954. Becoming a starter the following year, he was among the protagonists of promotion to Serie A.

In 1956 he was sold to Bologna, of which he became captain starting from the 1959–1960 season, winning the Scudetto in 1964 after a play-off against Inter.

In ten seasons at Bologna, from 1956 to 1966, he made 264 league appearances. In addition to the Scudetto, he collected two fourths and two fifths, in addition to the second of his last season, in which he took the field only three times.

After moving to Mantova, he played in Serie A for another two years, without being able to do anything in the year of relegation to Serie B in 1968. He finished his career in Serie A at 34, after thirteen seasons in which he played 349 games, in addition to the play-off for the 1964 title.

== International career ==
He obtained four international caps for his national B team.

== Managerial career ==
Pavinato served as manager of San Marino between 1971 and 1972.

== Personal life and death ==
His daughter married Francesco Gazzaneo, also a footballer.

Pavinato died in March 2021 at the age of 86, following kidney problems aggravated by contracting COVID-19 during the COVID-19 pandemic in Italy.

== Honours ==
Vicenza

- Serie B: 1954–55

Bologna

- Serie A: 1963–64
- Mitropa Cup: 1961
