= 1999–2000 Vicenza Calcio season =

Vicenza
1999–2000 season
- Head coach: Edoardo Reja
- Stadium: Stadio Romeo Menti
- Serie B: 1st (promoted)
- Coppa Italia: Group stage
- Top goalscorer: League: Gianni Comandini (20); All: Gianni Comandini (24)
- Highest home attendance: 16,421 vs Napoli
- Lowest home attendance: 9,437 vs Cosenza
- Average home league attendance: 12,221
- Biggest win: Vicenza 6–0 Empoli
- Biggest defeat: Alzano Virescit 3–0 Vicenza

The 1999–2000 season was Vicenza Calcio's 98th season in existence and the club's first season back in the second division of Italian football since 1995. In addition to the domestic league, Vicenza participated in this season's edition of the Coppa Italia.

== Pre-season and friendlies ==
Win Draw Loss

== Competitions ==
=== Overview ===
Competition	First match	Last match	Starting round	Final position	Record							
Competition	First match	Last match	Starting round	Final position	Pld	W	D	L	GF	GA	GD	Win %
Serie B	29 August 1999	11 June 2000	Matchday 1	Winners	38	20	7	11	69	45	+24	52.63
Coppa Italia	15 August 1999	15 September 1999	Group stage	Group stage	6	2	2	2	9	8	+1	33.33
Total					44	22	9	13	78	53	+25	50.00

Source: Competitions

=== Serie B ===
==== League table ====
Pos	Team	Pld	W	D	L	GF	GA	GD	Pts	Promotion or relegation
1	Vicenza (P, C)	38	20	7	11	69	45	+24	67	Promotion to Serie A
2	Atalanta (P)	38	17	12	9	51	34	+17	63	Promotion to Serie A
3	Brescia (P)	38	16	15	7	54	38	+16	63	Promotion to Serie A
4	Napoli (P)	38	17	12	9	55	44	+11	63	Promotion to Serie A
5	Sampdoria	38	17	11	10	45	40	+5	62	

Source: Almanacco Illustrato del Calcio - La Storia 1898-2004, Panini Edizioni, Modena, September 2005
Rules for classification: 1) points; 2) head-to-head points; 3) head-to-head goal difference; 4) head-to-head goals scored; 5) goal difference; 6) number of goals scored.
(C) Champions; (P) Promoted

==== Results summary ====
Overall								Home						Away					
Pld	W	D	L	GF	GA	GD	Pts	W	D	L	GF	GA	GD	W	D	L	GF	GA	GD
38	20	7	11	69	45	+24	67	16	2	1	47	16	+31	4	5	10	22	29	−7

==== Results by round ====
Round	1	2	3	4	5	6	7	8	9	10	11	12	13	14	15	16	17	18	19	20	21	22	23	24	25	26	27	28	29	30	31	32	33	34	35	36	37	38
Ground	A	H	A	H	A	H	A	H	A	H	A	H	A	H	A	H	A	H	A	H	A	H	A	H	A	H	A	H	A	H	A	H	A	H	A	H	A	H
Result	W	D	L	W	L	W	L	W	W	W	W	W	D	W	L	L	D	W	D	W	D	D	W	W	L	W	L	W	L	W	L	W	L	W	D	W	L	W
Position	4	3	10	5	9	6	7	4	3	3	3	2	2	1	1	2	2	1	1	1	1	1	1	1	1	1	1	1	1	1	1	1	1	1	1	1	1	1

A = Away; H = Home; W = Win; D = Draw; L = Loss

==== Matches ====
29 August 1999 1	Treviso	0–1	Vicenza	Treviso
--:-- CEST (UTC+2)

5 September 1999 2	Vicenza	1–1	Genoa	Vicenza
--:-- CEST (UTC+2)				Stadium: Stadio Romeo Menti

12 September 1999 3	Ternana	1–0	Vicenza	Terni
--:-- CEST (UTC+2)

19 September 1999 4	Vicenza	3–1	Alzano Virescit	Vicenza
--:-- CEST (UTC+2)				Stadium: Stadio Romeo Menti

26 September 1999 5	Napoli	2–1	Vicenza	Naples
--:-- CEST (UTC+2)

1 October 1999 6	Vicenza	6–0	Empoli	Vicenza
--:-- CEST (UTC+2)				Stadium: Stadio Romeo Menti

10 October 1999 7	Ravenna	2–1	Vicenza	Ravenna
--:-- CEST (UTC+2)

24 October 1999 8	Vicenza	2–0	Cosenza	Vicenza
--:-- CEST (UTC+2)				Stadium: Stadio Romeo Menti

31 October 1999 9	Fermana	1–2	Vicenza	Fermo
--:-- CEST (UTC+2)

7 November 1999 10	Vicenza	2–1	Pistoiese	Vicenza
--:-- CET (UTC+1)				Stadium: Stadio Romeo Menti

15 November 1999 11	Pescara	0–1	Vicenza	Pescara
--:-- CET (UTC+1)

21 November 1999 12	Vicenza	5–3	Atalanta	Vicenza
--:-- CET (UTC+1)				Stadium: Stadio Romeo Menti

28 November 1999 13	Brescia	1–1	Vicenza	Brescia
--:-- CET (UTC+1)

5 December 1999 14	Vicenza	2–1	Sampdoria	Vicenza
--:-- CET (UTC+1)				Stadium: Stadio Romeo Menti

12 December 1999 15	Salernitana	3–2	Vicenza	Salerno
--:-- CET (UTC+1)

17 December 1999 16	Vicenza	1–2	Chievo	Vicenza
--:-- CET (UTC+1)				Stadium: Stadio Romeo Menti

6 January 2000 17	Cesena	1–1	Vicenza	Cesena
--:-- CET (UTC+1)

9 January 2000 18	Vicenza	2–1	Monza	Vicenza
--:-- CET (UTC+1)				Stadium: Stadio Romeo Menti

17 January 2000 19	Savoia	1–1	Vicenza	Torre Annunziata
--:-- CET (UTC+1)

24 January 2000 20	Vicenza	2–0	Treviso	Vicenza
--:-- CET (UTC+1)				Stadium: Stadio Romeo Menti

30 January 2000 21	Genoa	2–2	Vicenza	Genoa
--:-- CET (UTC+1)

13 February 2000 22	Vicenza	0–0	Ternana	Vicenza
--:-- CET (UTC+1)				Stadium: Stadio Romeo Menti

20 February 2000 23	Alzano Virescit	1–3	Vicenza	Alzano Lombardo
--:-- CET (UTC+1)

28 February 2000 24	Vicenza	3–0	Napoli	Vicenza
--:-- CET (UTC+1)				Stadium: Stadio Romeo Menti

5 March 2000 25	Empoli	2–1	Vicenza	Empoli
--:-- CET (UTC+1)

12 March 2000 26	Vicenza	1–0	Ravenna	Vicenza
--:-- CET (UTC+1)				Stadium: Stadio Romeo Menti

17 March 2000 27	Cosenza	1–0	Vicenza	Cosenza
--:-- CET (UTC+1)

26 March 2000 28	Vicenza	4–0	Fermana	Vicenza
--:-- CET (UTC+1)				Stadium: Stadio Romeo Menti

2 April 2000 29	Pistoiese	3–1	Vicenza	Pistoia
--:-- CEST (UTC+2)

9 April 2000 30	Vicenza	3–1	Pescara	Vicenza
--:-- CEST (UTC+2)				Stadium: Stadio Romeo Menti

22 April 2000 31	Atalanta	1–0	Vicenza	Bergamo
--:-- CEST (UTC+2)

1 May 2000 32	Vicenza	2–1	Brescia	Vicenza
--:-- CEST (UTC+2)				Stadium: Stadio Romeo Menti

7 May 2000 33	Sampdoria	3–1	Vicenza	Genoa
--:-- CEST (UTC+2)

15 May 2000 34	Vicenza	2–0	Salernitana	Vicenza
--:-- CEST (UTC+2)				Stadium: Stadio Romeo Menti

21 May 2000 35	Chievo	2–2	Vicenza	Verona
--:-- CEST (UTC+2)

28 May 2000 36	Vicenza	3–2	Cesena	Vicenza
--:-- CEST (UTC+2)				Stadium: Stadio Romeo Menti

4 June 2000 37	Monza	2–1	Vicenza	Monza
--:-- CEST (UTC+2)

11 June 2000 38	Vicenza	3–2	Savoia	Vicenza
--:-- CEST (UTC+2)				Stadium: Stadio Romeo Menti

=== Coppa Italia ===
==== Group stage ====
15 August 1999 1	Ravenna	2–0	Vicenza	Ravenna
20:45 CEST (UTC+2)				Stadium: Stadio Bruno Benelli; Referee: Paolo Bertini

18 August 1999 2	Vicenza	5–0	SPAL	Vicenza
20:30 CEST (UTC+2)				Stadium: Stadio Romeo Menti; Referee: Danilo Nucini

22 August 1999 3	Vicenza	2–1	Alzano Virescit	Vicenza
15:00 CEST (UTC+2)				Stadium: Stadio Romeo Menti; Referee: Marco Gabriele

25 August 1999 4	Alzano Virescit	3–0	Vicenza	Bergamo
20:30 CEST (UTC+2)				Stadium: Stadio Atleti Azzurri d'Italia; Referee: Luciano Fausti

1 September 1999 5	Vicenza	1–1	Ravenna	Vicenza
20:30 CEST (UTC+2)				Stadium: Stadio Romeo Menti; Referee: Livio Bazzoli

15 September 1999 6	SPAL	1–1	Vicenza	Ferrara
20:30 CEST (UTC+2)				Stadium: Stadio Paolo Mazza; Referee: Gennaro Borriello
