= Vendrame =

Vendrame is a surname. Notable people with the surname include:

- Andrea Vendrame (born 1994), Italian cyclist
- Constantine Vendrame (1893–1957), Italian missionary
- Ezio Vendrame (1947–2020), Italian writer and footballer
- Ivano Vendrame (born 1997), Italian swimmer
- Leo Vendrame (born 1993), Japanese basketball player
