= 1954 Torneo di Viareggio =

1954 Torneo Mondiale di Calcio Coppa Carnevale
6° Torneo di Viareggio

Tournament details
- Host country: Italy
- City: Viareggio
- Teams: 16

Final positions
- Champions: (Italy) Lanerossi Vicenza
- Runners-up: (Italy) Juventus
- Third place: (Italy) Milan
- Fourth place: (Italy) Udinese

Tournament statistics
- Matches played: 16
- Goals scored: 52 (3.25 per match)

The 1954 winners of the Torneo di Viareggio (in English, the Viareggio Tournament, officially the Viareggio Cup World Football Tournament Coppa Carnevale), the annual youth football tournament held in Viareggio, Tuscany, are listed below.

== Format ==
The 16 teams are organized in knockout rounds, all played single tie.

== Participating teams ==
Italian teams

- (Italy) Fiorentina
- (Italy) Juventus
- (Italy) Lanerossi Vicenza
- (Italy) Milan
- (Italy) Roma
- (Italy) Sampdoria
- (Italy) Udinese
- (Italy) Viareggio

European teams

- Austria Wien
- (Switzerland) Chiasso
- (West Germany) Offenbach
- (Spain) SUED Madrid
- (Spain) Real Madrid
- (Denmark) Odense
- (Sweden) Landskrona
- (France) Stade de Reims

== Tournament fixtures ==
Round of 16
(West Germany) Offenbach	0
(Italy) Roma	3
(Italy) Milan	5
(Spain) SUED Madrid	2
(Italy) L.R. Vicenza	3
(Spain) Real Madrid	1
(Italy) Fiorentina	3
(Denmark) Odense	0
(Sweden) Landskrona	0
(Italy) Sampdoria	6
Austria Wien	0
(Italy) Udinese	1
(France) Stade de Reims	0
(Italy) Viareggio	2
(Switzerland) Chiasso	0
(Italy) Juventus	4

Quarter-finals
(Italy) Roma	0
(Italy) Milan	2
(Italy) L.R. Vicenza	2
(Italy) Fiorentina	2
(Italy) Udinese	2
(Italy) Sampdoria	1
(Italy) Viareggio	0
(Italy) Juventus	3

Semi-finals
(Italy) Milan	0
(Italy) L.R. Vicenza	3
(Italy) Udinese	1
(Italy) Juventus	1

Final
(Italy) L.R. Vicenza	2
(Italy) Juventus	1
Third place
(Italy) Milan	2
(Italy) Udinese	1

== Champions ==
Torneo di Viareggio 1954 Champions

L.R. Vicenza
1st time
