= Vilmos Wilheim =

Hungarian footballer (1895–1962)

Personal information
- Date of birth: 25 November 1895
- Place of birth: Budapest, Austro-Hungary
- Date of death: 1962
- Place of death: Unknown
- Position: Defender

Senior career*
Years	Team	Apps	(Gls)
–1916	KAOE		
1917–1923	Ferencváros	55	(0)
1923–1924	Vicenza		
1924–1925	Ferencváros	1	(0)
1925–1927	Cremonese		

Managerial career
- 1928–1931: Vicenza
- 1931–1935: Spezia
- 1935–1936: Foggia
- 1936–1939: Padova
- 1940: Slavija Sarajevo
- 1947–1948: Padova
- 1949–1950: Vicenza
- * Club domestic league appearances and goals

Vilmos Wilheim (25 November 1895 – 1962) was a Hungarian football manager and former player.

== Club career ==
Born in Hungarian capital Budapest, Wilheim played with KAOE before joining Ferencváros in 1916 and playing with them in the Hungarian championship since 1917. Later, he played in Italy with Vicenza (1923–24) and Cremonese (seasons 1925–26 and 1026–27). He made 15 appearances and scored 2 goals in the 1926–27 Divisione Nazionale.

== Coaching career ==
After retiring, Wilheim started his coaching career. Between 1928 and 1939 he coached in Italy the following clubs: Vicenza, Spezia, Foggia and Padova. Then he moved to Yugoslavia, coaching Bosnian side FK Slavija in their campaign in the 1939–40 Yugoslav Football Championship. In the late 1940s he returned to Italy and coached for second time Padova and Vicenza.

He was known in Italy also as Wilmas Wilhelm or Guglielmo Wilhelm.
