= Umberto Menti =

Italian footballer and coach

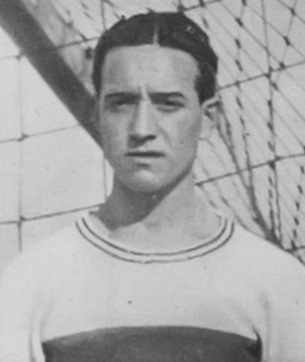

Personal information
- Date of birth: 6 April 1917
- Place of birth: Vicenza, Italy
- Date of death: 1 January 2002
- Place of death: Vicenza, Italy
- Height: 1.70 m (5 ft 7 in)
- Position: Midfielder

Senior career*
Years	Team	Apps	(Gls)
1932–1935	Vicenza	36	(5)
1935–1937	Juventus	44	(5)
1937–1938	Vicenza	30	(11)
1938–1939	Padova	34	(5)
1939–1941	Milano	28	(5)
1941–1943	Napoli	19	(2)
1943–1944	Padova	3	(0)
1945–1946	Trento	20	(3)
1946–1950	Schio		

Managerial career
- 1950–1971: L.R. Vicenza (assistant)
- 1967: L.R. Vicenza
- 1968: L.R. Vicenza
- 1971–1972: L.R. Vicenza
- * Club domestic league appearances and goals

Umberto Menti (born 6 April 1917 in Vicenza; died 1 January 2002 in Vicenza) was an Italian professional football player and coach who played as a midfielder.

His older brother Mario Menti, younger brother Romeo Menti and nephew Luigi Menti (son of Mario) all played football professionally, with Romeo playing in the Grande Torino, representing Italy and died in the Superga air disaster. To distinguish them, Mario was known as Menti I, Umberto as Menti II, Romeo as Menti III, and Luigi as Menti IV. In some sources, Mario was ignored and Umberto and Romeo were listed as Menti I and Menti II respectively.
