= Roberto Lerici =

Italian footballer and manager

Personal information
- Date of birth: April 30, 1924
- Place of birth: Rivarolo Ligure, Italy
- Date of death: March 4, 2004 (aged 79)
- Place of death: Athens, Greece
- Position: Midfielder

Senior career*
| Years | Team | Apps | (Gls) |
| 1942–1943 | Derthona | | |
| 1945–1946 | Sarzanese | | |
| 1946–1947 | Spezia | 2 | (1) |
| 1947–1948 | Pisa | 32 | (16) |
| 1948–1950 | Internazionale | 5 | (1) |
| 1950–1953 | Vicenza | 104 | (31) |
| 1953–1955 | Alessandria | 40 | (15) |
| 1955–1957 | Marsala | | |

Managerial career
- 1956–1957: Marsala
- 1957–1962: L.R. Vicenza
- 1962–1963: Sampdoria
- 1963–1964: Napoli
- 1964–1965: Genoa
- 1967–1968: Venezia
- 1969: Como
- * Club domestic league appearances and goals

Roberto Lerici (April 30, 1924 in Rivarolo Ligure – March 4, 2004 in Athens, Greece) was an Italian professional football player and coach. Lerici made five appearances for Inter Milan during the 1948 to 1949 seasons.

Later, he became a coach. During the 1963 to 1964 season, he coached Napoli for 26 matches.
