= 1954–55 Serie B =

Italian football league season

Serie B
- Season: 1954–55
- Champions: Vicenza; 1st title

Serie B 1954-55 team distribution

The Serie B 1954–55 was the twenty-third tournament of this competition played in Italy since its creation.

== Teams ==
Parma and Taranto had been promoted from Serie C, while Palermo and Legnano had been relegated from Serie A.

== Final classification ==
Pos	Team	Pld	W	D	L	GF	GA	GR	Pts	Promotion or relegation
1	Lanerossi Vicenza (P, C)	34	22	6	6	53	21	2.524	50	Promotion to Serie A
2	Padova (P)	34	15	12	7	46	27	1.704	42	Promotion to Serie A
3	Modena	34	13	14	7	42	30	1.400	40	
3	Legnano	34	13	14	7	42	36	1.167	40	
5	Brescia	34	15	7	12	44	36	1.222	37	
5	Como	34	11	15	8	33	27	1.222	37	
7	Messina	34	11	14	9	46	43	1.070	36	
8	Marzotto	34	14	7	13	55	45	1.222	35	
9	Cagliari	34	10	13	11	33	35	0.943	33	
9	Parma	34	8	17	9	37	40	0.925	33	
11	ArsenalTaranto (Note: U.S. Arsenaltaranto changed its name back to A.C. Taranto at the end of the season.)	34	12	8	14	31	38	0.816	32	
12	Salernitana	34	9	13	12	44	56	0.786	31	
13	Palermo	34	10	10	14	38	43	0.884	30	
13	Monza (Note: A.C. Monza merged with A.S. Simmenthal and changed its name to A.S. Simmenthal-Monza at the end of the season.)	34	8	14	12	34	43	0.791	30	
15	Alessandria	34	10	8	16	30	40	0.750	28	
15	Verona	34	10	8	16	35	50	0.700	28	
17	Treviso (R)	34	7	13	14	32	45	0.711	27	Relegation to Serie C
18	Pavia (R)	34	7	9	18	32	52	0.615	23	Relegation to Serie C

Source: Panini
(C) Champions; (P) Promoted; (R) Relegated

== Results ==
Home \ Away	ALE	ARS	BRE	CAG	COM	LRV	LEG	MAR	MES	MOD	MON	PAD	PAL	PAR	PAV	SAL	TRV	HEL
Alessandria		1–0	1–0	1–0	2–1	0–1	0–0	2–1	1–1	1–1	2–2	2–2	0–1	2–1	2–0	0–0	0–1	2–0
ArsenalTaranto	2–0		1–2	2–1	2–0	2–0	1–0	2–1	2–1	2–2	2–3	0–1	1–0	2–0	1–0	1–1	1–0	2–0
Brescia	2–1	3–0		0–1	0–0	1–0	0–1	4–1	2–1	2–0	1–1	0–0	0–0	2–1	4–0	3–0	3–1	3–2
Cagliari	1–0	1–1	1–1		2–2	1–0	1–1	2–0	0–1	0–0	1–1	1–0	2–1	1–1	1–0	1–1	2–0	0–0
Como	1–1	1–0	1–0	1–0		3–3	0–0	3–1	0–0	0–1	5–0	1–0	0–1	1–2	1–1	0–0	2–1	2–0
L.R. Vicenza	1–0	4–1	3–0	1–0	3–0		2–1	1–0	4–1	0–0	2–1	1–0	3–0	2–1	3–1	3–0	1–2	0–1
Legnano	2–1	0–0	1–1	1–0	0–0	0–0		1–0	2–2	2–1	3–2	3–1	2–1	3–1	1–1	2–1	2–0	3–1
Marzotto	4–2	1–0	5–1	3–0	1–0	0–1	2–1		3–1	0–0	3–1	0–1	4–2	3–2	7–1	3–3	2–2	3–1
Messina	1–0	1–1	3–0	2–2	2–1	2–1	3–3	2–0		1–1	1–0	2–0	1–1	1–2	1–0	1–2	2–2	1–0
Modena	3–2	2–0	2–2	1–1	0–0	1–2	1–1	1–0	1–0		1–0	4–2	1–0	2–1	3–0	3–0	3–1	4–0
Monza	1–0	2–0	0–3	1–0	0–0	1–1	3–1	0–0	1–1	1–1		1–1	2–1	1–1	2–0	3–0	1–1	0–0
Padova	1–2	1–0	1–0	1–0	1–1	0–0	3–0	0–0	3–1	2–0	2–0		2–2	2–2	2–1	0–0	3–0	4–1
Palermo	1–0	1–0	1–0	3–3	1–1	0–2	0–1	0–0	1–1	1–1	2–0	0–2		2–1	3–0	1–3	0–0	3–0
Parma	1–0	0–0	2–1	1–2	2–2	0–0	0–0	2–1	1–1	0–0	0–0	0–0	3–2		1–0	1–1	1–1	2–1
Pavia	0–0	4–1	2–0	2–2	0–1	1–2	2–0	0–0	2–1	2–0	2–1	1–1	0–2	0–0		4–1	1–1	0–1
Salernitana	1–2	1–1	0–1	2–1	0–1	0–3	2–2	4–1	3–3	1–0	2–0	0–3	2–2	1–1	4–3		2–2	5–2
Treviso	2–0	3–0	1–2	0–1	0–0	0–2	1–1	0–1	0–2	1–1	2–2	0–3	2–1	1–1	1–0	2–0		1–1
Hellas Verona	4–0	0–0	1–0	3–1	0–1	0–1	2–1	2–4	1–1	2–0	1–0	1–1	3–1	2–2	1–1	0–1	1–0	

Source: Almanacco Illustrato del Calcio - La Storia 1898-2004, Panini Edizioni, Modena, September 2005 (in Italian)
Legend: Blue = home team win; Yellow = draw; Red = away team win.

== References and sources ==
- Almanacco Illustrato del Calcio - La Storia 1898-2004, Panini Edizioni, Modena, September 2005
