= Giulio Fasolo =

Italian football player

Personal information
- Date of birth: 14 October 1998 (age 28)
- Place of birth: Vicenza, Italy
- Height: 1.68 m (5 ft 6 in)
- Position: Forward

Team information
- Current team: Luparense

Youth career
- –2016: Cittadella

Senior career*
Years	Team	Apps	(Gls)
2016–2019	Cittadella	5	(0)
2018–2019	→ Virtus Verona (loan)	12	(0)
2019–2020	Gozzano	8	(1)
2020	Pro Sesto	2	(0)
2020–2021	Mestre	30	(9)
2021–2023	Clodiense	56	(16)
2023	Cjarlins Muzane	13	(0)
2023–2024	Adriese	19	(2)
2024–	Luparense	8	(1)
- * Club domestic league appearances and goals as of 10 November 2024

Giulio Fasolo (born 14 October 1998) is an Italian football player who plays for Serie D club Luparense.

== Club career ==
He made his Serie B debut for Cittadella on 18 May 2017 in a game against Virtus Entella.

On 3 August 2019, he signed with Gozzano. On 23 January 2020, his contract with Gozzano was terminated by mutual consent. On the following day, he signed with Serie D club Pro Sesto. In the summer 2020, Fasolo moved to fellow league club Mestre.
