= Stadio Romeo Menti =

Football stadium

Coordinates: 45°32′39″N 11°33′20″E

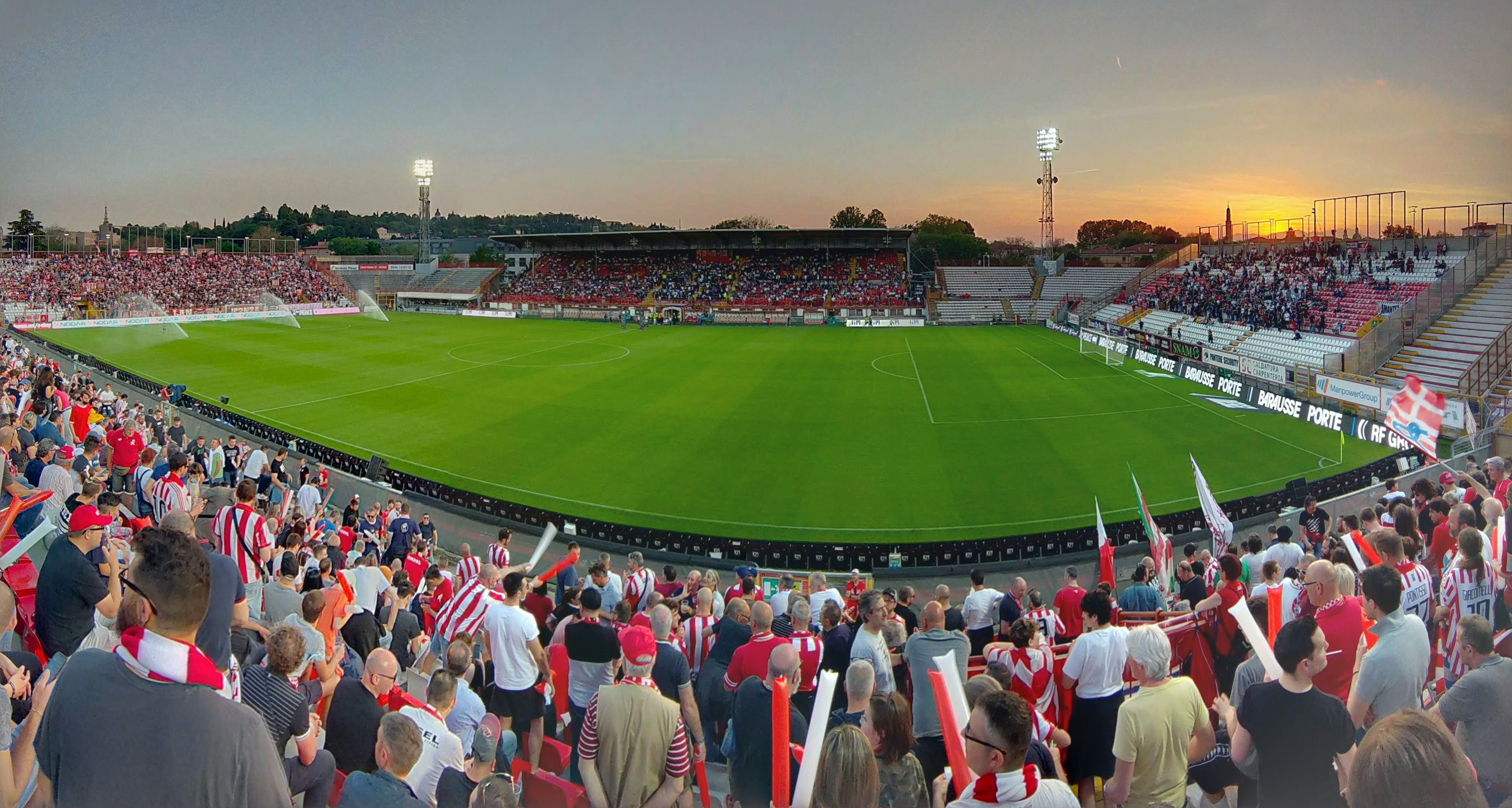
- Panorama of the stadium in 2022.
- Interactive map of Stadio Romeo Menti
- Former names: Stadio Comunale (1935–1949)
- Location: Vicenza, Italy
- Owner: Municipality of Vicenza
- Capacity: 12,000
- Surface: Grass; 105x68m

Construction
- Opened: 1935

Tenant
- Vicenza Calcio

Stadio Romeo Menti is a football stadium in Vicenza, Italy, named after Romeo Menti. It is currently the home of L.R. Vicenza. The stadium holds 12,000.

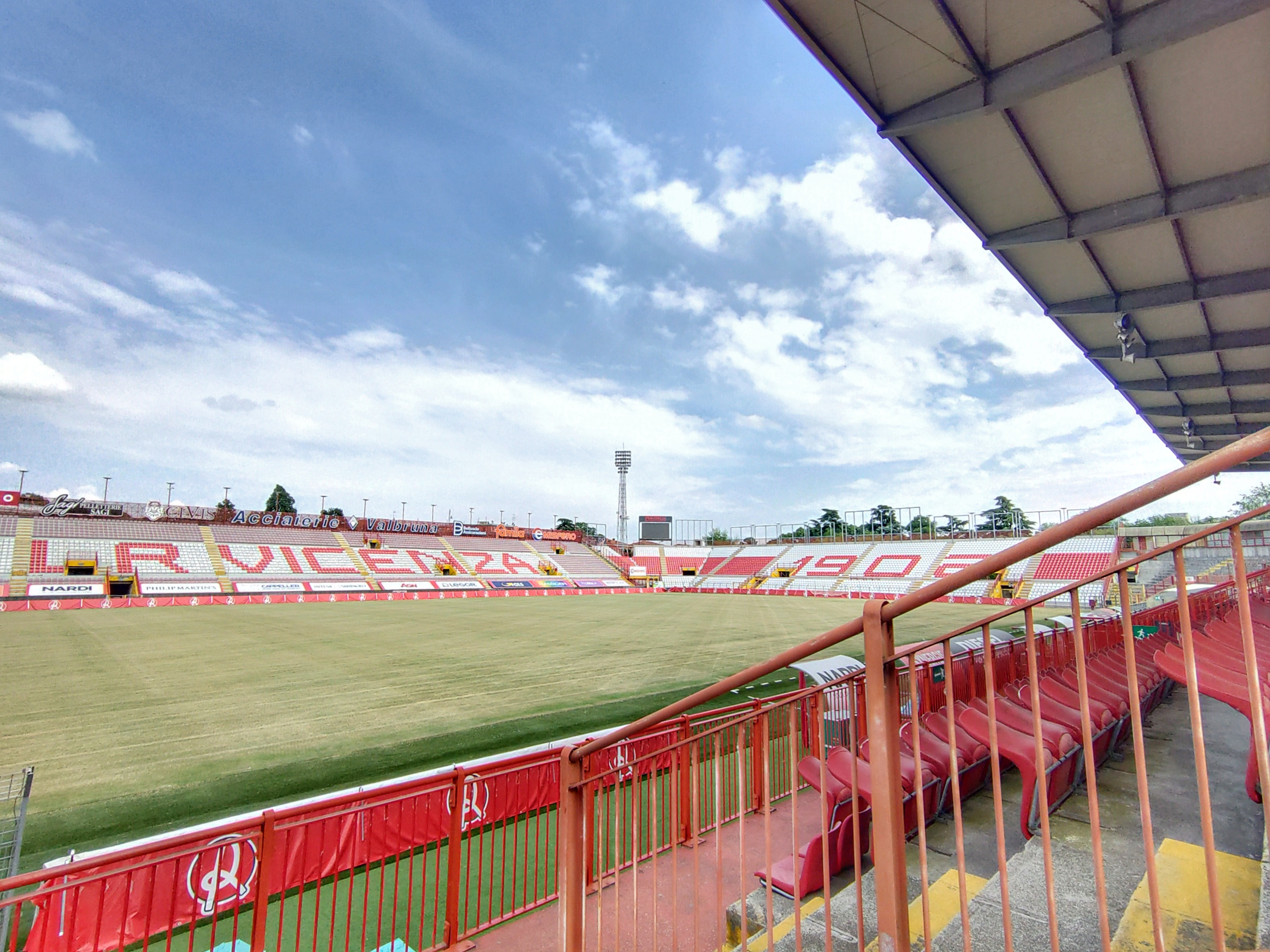
Panorama of the stadium in 2021.

== Recent years ==
On 11 November 1989 the stadium hosted the only game played so far in Vicenza in the Italy national football team. The match, a friendly in preparation for the World Cup Italy 90, saw the victory of Italy 1–0 against Algeria.

Subsequent work removed the metal pillars of the old grandstand that hindered filming of football matches, along with the installation of seats in a field at the corner of the south stand. In 2007 an adaptation of the structure finally saw the laying of the entrance turnstiles and the strengthening of surveillance.

On September 21, 2013 an initiative called Give a hand to Menti, saw the repainting of the exterior, with the participation of the players and the mayor Achille Variati.
