= Luigi Menti =

Italian footballer (1934–2013)

Personal information
- Date of birth: 1 October 1934
- Place of birth: Vicenza, Veneto, Kingdom of Italy
- Date of death: 11 December 2013 (aged 79)
- Place of death: Vicenza, Veneto, Italy
- Height: 1.76 m (5 ft 9 in)
- Position: Midfielder

Senior career*
Years	Team	Apps	(Gls)
1952–1957	Vicenza		
1957–1958	Padova		
1958–1969	Vicenza	291	(17)
- * Club domestic league appearances and goals

Luigi Menti (1 October 1934 – 11 December 2013) was an Italian footballer who played as a midfielder. He died on 11 December 2013, aged 79, in Vicenza, Veneto, Italy.
