= Ezio Vendrame =

Italian footballer (1947–2020)

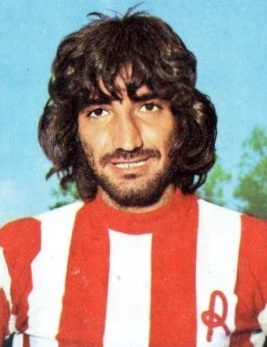
- Born: 21 November 1947; Casarsa della Delizia, Province of Pordenone, Italy
- Died: 4 April 2020 (aged 72); Treviso, Italy
- Occupations: Writer; Footballer; Manager
- Height: 1.81 m (5 ft 11 in)
Association football career
- Position: Midfielder
Youth career
- 1960–1967: Udinese
Senior career*
| Years | Team | Apps | (Gls) |
| 1966–1967 | Udinese | 2 | (0) |
| 1967–1968 | SPAL | 0 | (0) |
| 1968–1969 | → Torres (loan) | 11 | (1) |
| 1969–1970 | → Siena (loan) | 31 | (1) |
| 1970–1971 | Roverto | 9 | (0) |
| 1971–1974 | Vicenza | 46 | (1) |
| 1974–1975 | Napoli | 3 | (0) |
| 1975–1977 | Padova | 57 | (8) |
| 1977–1978 | Audace SME | 34 | (5) |
| 1978–1979 | Pordenone | 7 | (1) |
| 1979–1981 | Juniors Casarsa | ? | (?) |
| 1982–1983 | US Opitergina | ? | (?) |
| 1983–1986 | Juniors Casarsa | ? | (?) |
| Total | | 200+ | (17+) |
Managerial career
- 1987–1990: Pordenone (youth)
- 1990–1991: Venezia (youth)
- 1991–2002: Sanvitese (youth)
- * Club domestic league appearances and goals

Ezio Vendrame (21 November 1947 – 4 April 2020) was an Italian writer, manager, and footballer, who played as a midfielder. Due to his style of play, physical appearance, and lifestyle of the pitch, he earned the nickname "The Italian George Best."

== Early life and non-League career ==
Vendrame was born in Casarsa della Delizia, Province of Pordenone, Italy. Vendrame began his playing career in the Udinese youth sector at the age of 13, played two matches for the senior team in 1966 and later moved to Serie A side SPAL in 1967, but did not make a single appearance for the team. He later played for Torres, and subsequently Siena in 1969, before returning to SPAL once again, in Serie C; he also played for Roverto. He made his Serie A debut with Vicenza in 1971, where he rose to hero status due to his performances; he remained with the club until 1974, Subsequently, Inter Milan and Napoli expressed interest in signing him. when he earned a move to Napoli; however, he only remained with the latter side for a season, as he soon fell out of favour with the club's strict manager – Luís Vinício – and struggled to gain playing time, obtaining only three appearances during his time with the team. In total, he scored one goal in 49 Serie A appearances.

Despite his talent in his youth, he ultimately failed to live up to his potential, however, and spent the remainder of his career in the lower divisions of Italian football, first in Serie C, spending two seasons with Padova – collecting 57 appearances – and subsequently Azzanese for a season; during his time with the former club, he became known for three incidents in particular. The first incident came in a 0–0 home draw against Cremonese during the 1976–77 season; in order to entertain the crowd during a rather dull and goalless match (the match had been fixed so that it would ultimately end in a 0–0 draw, as Cremonese only needed a single point to obtain promotion to Serie B, with two games of the season remaining, while the result would not have affected Padova), he picked up the ball at the edge of the opposing penalty area and subsequently ran towards his half, dribbling through all the players of the opposing team as well his own team, including his own goalkeeper – after wrong–footing him with a fake shot – before finally stopping the ball on the goal–line and then starting the play back up again. The second incident occurred when he stopped a home match at the Stadio Silvio Appiani in order to say hello to his friend singer–songwriter Piero Ciampi, whom he noticed was among the crowd watching the game in the stands. The third incident came in an away match against his former club Udinese, who were fighting to obtain promotion to Serie B at the time. Vendrame had reportedly been offered seven million lire to "play badly," during the match. He initially accepted, as Padova were facing financial difficulties at the time, and players only received match bonuses of 22,000 lire per point, the minimum amount allowed by the FIGC. However, during the match, after being jeered by the home crowd, he scored two goals to help Padova to a 3–2 away win, one of which came from an Olympic goal. Prior to scoring the latter goal, Padova won a corner, which Vendrame proceeded to take; he reportedly told the opposing fans through his gesticulations that he would score from the ensuing corner kick, and subsequently went on to score. After the match, he only received his customary 44,000 lire bonus for a two–point victory, as he decided to break the agreement. He then moved to Audace San Michele, a team from Verona, in Serie C 1977–78. Vendrame later played in Serie D for a season with Pordenone – helping the club win the league title and earn promotion to Serie C2 during the 1978–79 season – and finally in the amateur divisions with his hometown club Juniors Casara, with whom he was disqualified in 1981 after behaving aggressively towards a for snatching the yellow card and whistle from the referee during a match. The lifetime ban was first commuted, at the regional level, to a 5-year ban and then amnestied for Italy's victory at the 1982 World Cup. With the ban cancelled, he played for US Opitergina in the 1982–83 season and then, after returning to the ranks of S.a.S. Juniors, where he ended his career as a footballer in the 1985-86 season, he began his career as a coach.

== Style of play and temperament ==
Described in the media as a "classic number ten," Vendrame was a talented and creative yet tenacious midfielder, who could play as an offensive central midfielder, as a mezzala or inside forward, or as a winger. Possessing excellent technique, flair, dribbling skills, and an eye for the final pass, he was regarded as one of the most promising young Italian players early in his career, even earning the nickname "the Italian George Best," due to his physical appearance (namely his beard and long hair), skills, playing style, movements, position, rebellious personality, and anti–conformist "hippy" lifestyle off the pitch, which made him a symbol of Italian football during the 1970s, and highly popular with the fans, but also made his relationships with his managers difficult (indeed, Vendrame was known for both smoking and drinking throughout his career). He was also occasionally known in the Italian media by the nickname "il poeta del gol" ("the goal poet," in Italian), and was also compared to Mario Kempes on occasion throughout his career, due to his hairstyle and playing position. Despite his skill and talent, however, he ultimately failed to live up to his potential and establish himself at the top level due to his strong character, behaviour, and lack of tactical discipline on the pitch; as such, certain pundits accused him of "wasting his talent." Moreover, his career was often marked by inconsistency, and he frequently alternated excellent performances with disappointing ones.

== Coaching career ==
Following his retirement, Vendrame pursued a coaching career with little success; he coached the youth teams of Pordenone, Venezia, and Sanvitese, but often came into conflict with the parents of the members of the youth teams he coached. As he favoured the technical aspect of the game over tactics, he was known for his rigorous training sessions which focussed predominantly on technique and his teams' play while in possession of the ball, rather than on athletic preparation, tactics, or set plays, with one of his former players once remarking: "he only ever made us run as a punishment."

== Personal life and health ==
Following his retirement from football, Vendrame pursued a career as a writer, publishing several books, including "Se mi mandi in tribuna godo" in 2002 ("If you send me to set in the stands I will enjoy it," in Italian – a reference to a phrase he had uttered after being excluded from the first team by his Napoli manager Vinício before a match against Cagliari during the 1974–75 season), in which he expressed that one of his biggest regrets as a footballer was disrespectfully nutmegging A.C. Milan star Gianni Rivera, who was one of his footballing idols, along with Luigi Meroni, Gianfranco Zigoni, and Diego Maradona. Vendrame was also deeply interested in music and poetry; he also wrote songs, poems, and even played the guitar. He has a wife, Roberta and had a daughter named Francesca. Vendrame died of cancer and COVID-19 at the age of 72 on 4 April 2020.

== Honours ==
Pordenone

- Serie D: 1978–79 (Promotion to Serie C2)

Individual

- Vicenza player of the season: 1971–72, 1972–73, 1973–74
- Padova player of the season: 1975–76, 1976–77
- Pordenone player of the season: 1978–79

== Bibliography ==
- Io di nascosto. Pasian di Prato: Campanotto. 1994.
- Senza alcun anticorpo. Udine: Campanotto. 1994.
- Inamovibilità di un marchio. Pordenone: Biblioteca dell'immagine. 1997.
- Quel che rimane... Le non poesie di un non poeta. Rodeano Alto: LitoImmagine. 1998.
- Un farabutto esistere. Pordenone: Biblioteca dell'immagine. 1999.
- Le cose della vita. Pordenone: Biblioteca dell'immagine. 2002.
- Se mi mandi in tribuna, godo. Pordenone: Biblioteca dell'immagine. 2002.
- Dio Zigo pensaci tu. Pordenone: Biblioteca dell'immagine. 2003.
- Vietato alla gente perbene. Pordenone: Biblioteca dell'immagine. 2003.
- Il mio cuore stuprato. Pordenone: Biblioteca dell'immagine. 2004.
- Una vita fuorigioco. Milano: Rizzoli. 2004.
- Calci al vento. Milano: Rizzoli. 2005.
- Il mio miele ti avvelenerà. Milano: Arnoldo Mondadori Editore. 2006.
- Via Quarto 49. Pordenone: Biblioteca dell'immagine. 2009.
- dell, inutile (2013). Treviso. Devanzis. Pordenone: Capolavoro. ISBN 978-1-84018-930-8.
