= LR Vicenza =

Association football club in Vicenza, Italy

Vicenza
- Full name: L.R. Vicenza S.p.A.
- Nicknames: I Biancorossi; Lanerossi/Lane; La Nobile Provinciale; I Berici
- Founded: 9 March 1902; 124 years ago 2018; 8 years ago (refounded)
- Stadium: Stadio Romeo Menti
- Capacity: 12,000
- Owner: OTB Group S.p.A.
- President: Stefano Rosso
- Head coach: Fabio Gallo
- League: Serie B
- 2025–26: Serie C Group A, 1st of 20 (promoted)
- Website: lrvicenza.net
Home colours	Away colours	Third colours

L.R. Vicenza S.p.A. (acronym for Lanerossi Vicenza), better known as Vicenza or Lanerossi, is an Italian football club based in the city of Vicenza. It plays in Serie B, the second division of the Italian football league, following their promotion after the 2025–26 season.

Founded on 9 March 1902, as Associazione del Calcio in Vicenza, it is the oldest football club in north-eastern Italy as well as in the Triveneto and Veneto regions. It has competed in 30 Serie A seasons and is listed by the IFFHS as the 15th best Italian team of the 20th century.

Domestically, Vicenza won the Coppa Italia in 1996–1997 and the Italian Cup Serie C in 1981–1982 and 2022–2023, while its best result at international level is reaching the semi-final of the UEFA Cup Winners' Cup (1997–1998). It reached the final in the 1910–1911 First Division championship, where it was defeated by Pro Vercelli, and finished as runners-up Juventus in the 1977–1978 Serie A championship, in which it achieved the best result ever by a newly promoted club in the single-round era.

The club was reformed in 2018, following Vicenza Calcio's bankruptcy, thanks to the moving and name change of Bassano Virtus (then owned by OTB Group) from Bassano to Vicenza. L.R Vicenza is now the heir, and de facto continuation, of the sporting tradition that began on 9 March 1902 with the founding of Associazione del Calcio in Vicenza which later became Lanerossi Vicenza from 1953 to 1989 and finally Vicenza Calcio, before going bankrupt in 2018.

== History ==
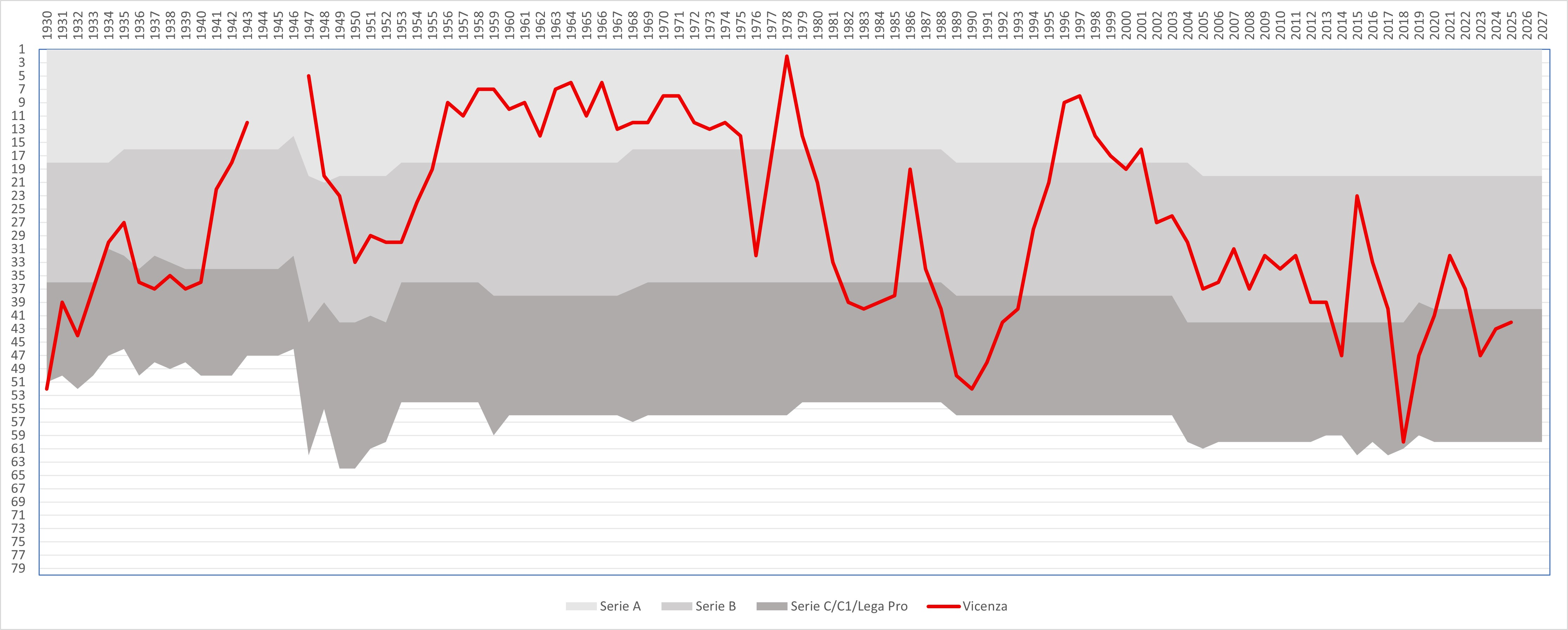
The performance of Vicenza in the Italian football league structure since the first season of a unified Serie A (1929/30).

Vicenza, founded in 1902 by a group of citizens led by Professor Tito Buy, headmaster of the Lioy High School, and by physical education teacher Antonio Libero Scarpa, it is one of the oldest football clubs in Italy. The formation of the first board of directors took place on 9 March 1902, while the competitive debut took place on 18 May 1903 in a friendly match valid for the Provincial Championship for Schools.

The professional debut dates back to the 1910–11 season: ACIVI (as Vicenza was called for its first fifty years, acronym of Associazione del Calcio in Vicenza) inaugurated its new Borgo Casale ground on 12 February 1911 with a great victory over Bologna and in March finished the Veneto-Emilia round with a full score, qualifying for the final for the title. However, it had to succumb, both away and at home, to Pro Vercelli which was in its golden years.

Vicenza challenged Pro Vercelli in the double final of the 1910–1911 First Category championship.

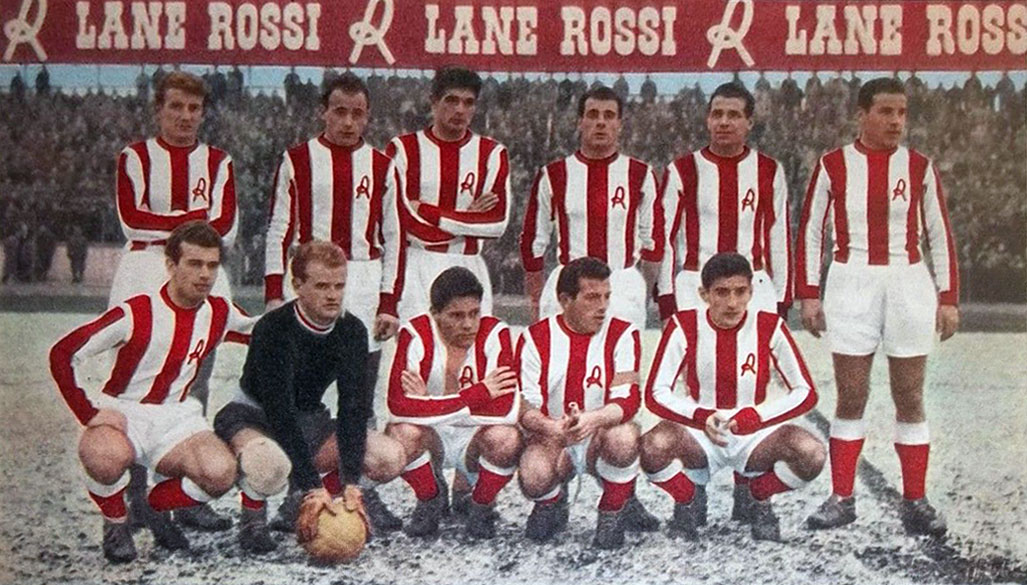
1953–54 L.R. Vicenza

In the years before the First World War it took part to several national finals of northern Italy, which were played between the winners of the regional groups. Vicenza thus met Bologna, Juventus, Milan and Inter several times, establishing itself among the best Italian teams.

Vicenza began in the First Category in the 1920s competing in various regional groups. In 1921–22 it joined the schism of the great teams, going to play in the C.C.I. championship: it finished last in group A, a result that condemned it to having to play and win the inter-divisional qualifiers against teams from the Second Division to escape relegation. When the Compromesso Colombo was implemented, it faced the inter-divisional qualification round which it lost against Derthona, thus leaving the top national division. In the 1924–25 season Vicenza won the elimination round of the Second Division after play-offs with Udinese and Olympia Fiume, but was then disqualified and downgraded to last place due to the irregular positions of the Hungarians Horváth and Molnár; however, it was not relegated because thanks to the Italian Football Federation. Unprepared for the transformations that were launching Italian football towards professionalism, it was overwhelmed by the various tournament restructurings, leading to the 1929 plummeting to the fourth level of the national football pyramid.

=== Romeo Menti ===
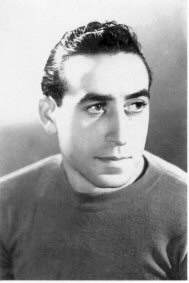
Romeo Menti

The 1930s were years of redemption for the biancorossi, after a decade to forget. In 1932–1933 the team was promoted to Serie B, where it remained for two seasons, while trying again and again to gain promotion to Serie A. In that period the "biancorossi" churned out talents of the calibre of the Umberto brothers and above all Romeo Menti, captain "Neno" Rossi, Bruno Camolese, Luigi Chiodi, Giovanni Costa, and the star Piero Spinato, the club's top scorer to this day. In the 1939–1940 season promotion to Serie B arrived with a clear advantage over the second team. On 8 September 1935 a new stadium along the Bacchiglione river had been inaugurated, leaving the Borgo Casale pitch, the inaugural match was against the Hungarian team Soroksár with a 16-year-old Romeo Menti making his professional debut. After his death during the 1949 Superga air disaster, the stadium in Vicenza would be named in his honor.

At the beginning of the 1940s Vicenza conquered the top national division, thanks also to a midfield that went down in history as one of the best of the era formed by: Osvaldo Fattori (later at Inter), Alfonso Santagiuliana (who also played for Grande Torino) and Luigi Abeni (whose career was cut short by illness).

=== Serie A 1942–1943: the Vicenza eleven in Juventus-Vicenza 2–6 ===
Vicenza's Serie A 1942–1943 season ended with a historic escape from relegation, won on the last day by defeating Juventus 6–2 in Turin on Easter Sunday 1943. After 8 September they took part in the Veneto round of the 1944 War championship, but renounced the national finals. After the Second World War, Vicenza returned to play in Serie A, after the mixed championship of 1946. In the 1946–1947 Serie A, when the single-round championship returned, Vicenza surprisingly placed fifth (the team's best scorer was Bruno Quaresima from Vicenza); the following year, however, the team finished last (the only time in the history that Vicenza ended at the bottom of the table) and was relegated. In 1949 Vicenza came close to an immediate return to Serie A, but it slipped away by one point. This was followed by several seasons in Serie B in which it placed in mid-table, and which were characterised by economic problems.

=== Lanerossi Vicenza ===
On 26 June 1953 an event occurred that would change the history of the Vicenza club for many decades: the old ACIVI was bought by the Schio-based wool producing giant, Lanerossi, founded in the 19th century by Alessandro Rossi. This was not the first case of football sponsorship in Italy, which was still forbidden at the time, but instead a so-called coupling, i.e. a real takeover: the football club became a rib of the textile company, even carrying its name and symbol – the R – on its shirts (sponsorship would only be allowed in the early 1980s). The logo remained on the red and white shirts until the 1988–1989 season, but has made a return since the 2000s as it has become a de facto symbol of the Vicenza football club even following the company's departure.

Luís Vinício and Giulio Savoini, were Lanerossi's flag-bearers in the early 50s two players who would go down in history as some of the club's best.

=== The golden twenty years in Serie A (1955–1975) ===
The injection of confidence and, above all, cash allowed Vicenza to set up a team that soon, after a season of adjustment, returned to Serie A in 1955 after seven seasons, with coach Aldo Campatelli and many goals from Enrico Motta. On their return to the top division Vicenza achieved a surprising escape from relegation with a ninth-place finish. The glory of the first team was complemented by winning the famous Viareggio tournament in 1954 and 1955, twice in a row. From the Viareggio team came players such as Azeglio Vicini, Sergio Campana, Renzo Cappellaro, Mario David, Mirko Pavinato, Luigi Menti and many others who later wore the biancorossa shirt in Serie A. In the second half of the 1950s, the offensive department was strengthened with the addition of two South Americans, first Américo Murolo and, in the following season, Francisco Lojacono, as well as the Vicenza-born Renzo Cappellaro.

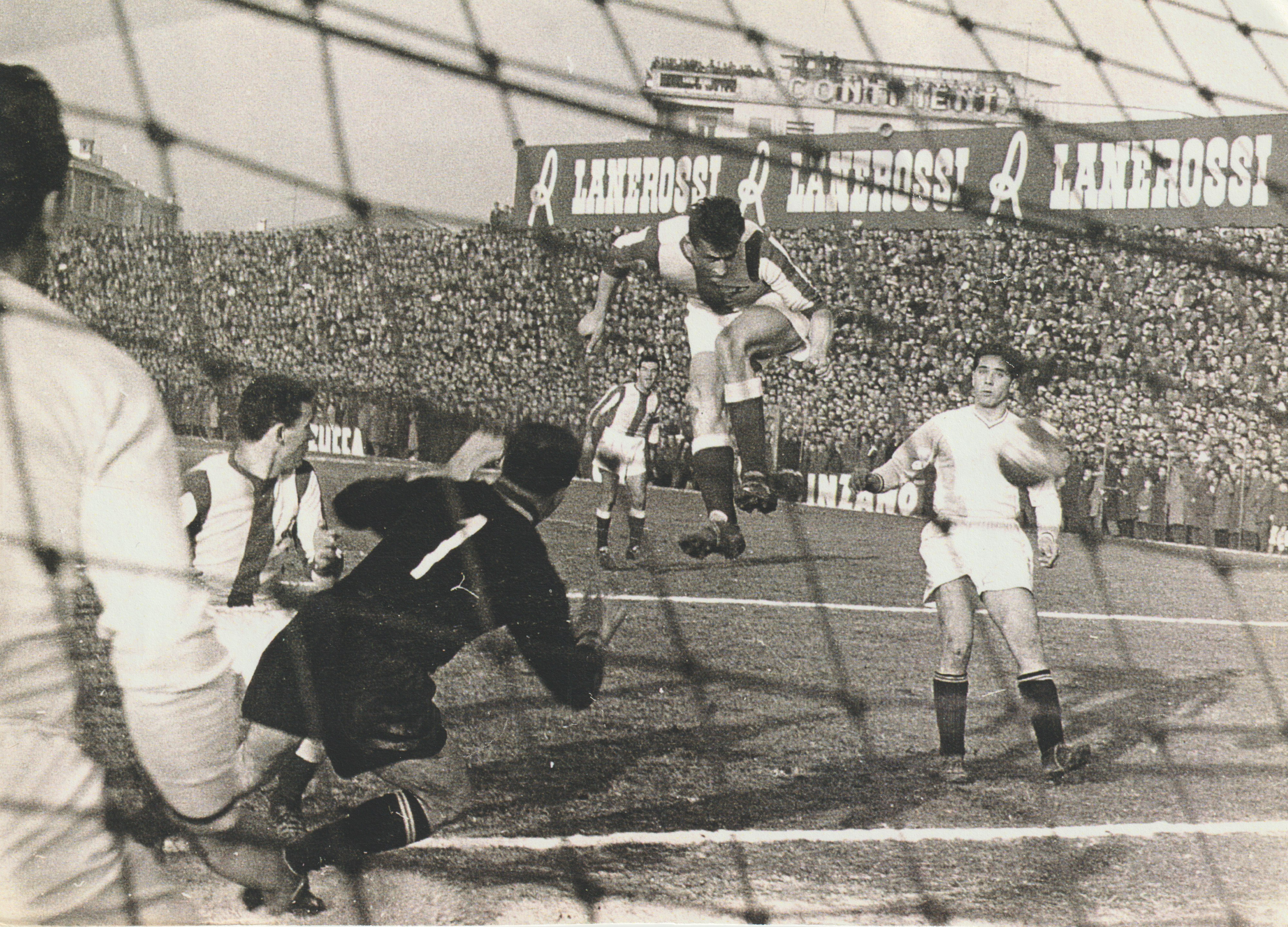
Lanerossi Vicenza-Padova 1957–1958 at Stadio Romeo Menti

At the turn of the decade Vicenza placed with two consecutive seventh places, and in 1960–1961 the coach Roberto Lerici (a former biancorosso player in the 1950s) won the Seminatore d'oro award for best coach of the season. Lanerossi maintained its characteristics of a provincial club, careful about budgets, that valorised young players, produced from its youth sector or coming from other teams, maintaining a strong nucleus of flagship players, and occasionally welcoming great players at the end of their careers, such as Giovan Battista Fabbri and Paolo Rossi, respectively coach and striker of Lanerossi in the second half of the 1970s.

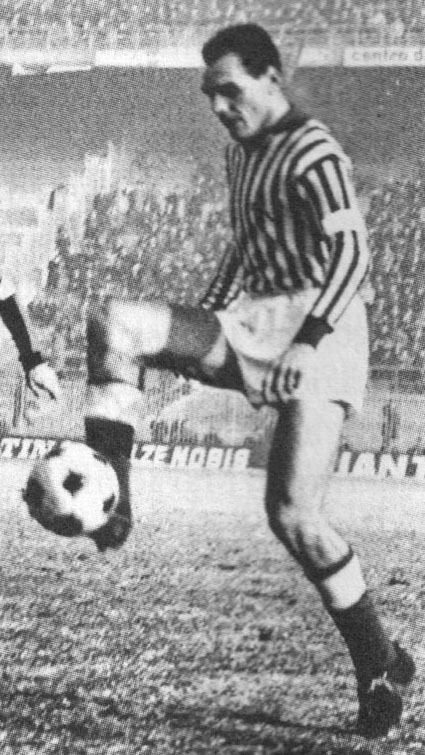
Luís Vinício in 1960s Lanerossi Vicenza

In 1962, the arrival of 30-year-old Brazilian centre forward Luís Vinício brought further lustre to the team. In the 1963–1964 Serie A season Vicenza rose to first place in the league table for three consecutive matches, taking sixth place at the end of the championship. Luis Vinicio in the 1965–1966 season, his best season, was the league's top scorer's with 25 goals (it would take twenty-six years for a Serie A player to score that many: it would be Marco van Basten in 1991–1992). Lanerossi finished that season fifth.

However, great results were followed by years in which relegation was risked, often escaping it on the last match day. Among the most risky escapes from relegation, a historic one was that of 1972–1973, in which Lanerossi seemed doomed, but with three victories in the last three match days managed to climb the slope up to play a relegation match against Atalanta, winning it thanks to an own goal by Atalanta. Luck deserted Lanerossi in 1975 when, in their 20th consecutive Serie A championship, they were relegated to Serie B.

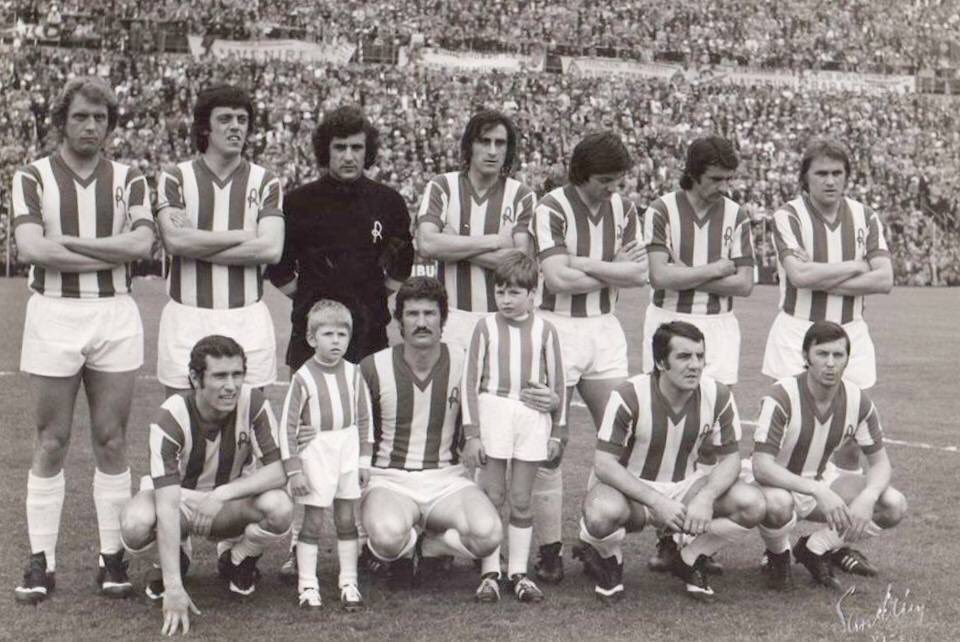
1973–74 L.R. Vicenza

After an opaque 1975–76 season in which they even risked relegation to Serie C, Lanerossi went into the 1976–77 season with little hope. However, the new coach, Giovan Battista Fabbri had an intuition: he transformed the young Paolo Rossi (who lead the Italian National Football Team to winning the 1982 FIFA World Cup and during which he won the Golden Boot and Golden Ball, in the same season he was also awarded the Balon d'Or) from a right winger with poor prospects into an excellent centre forward, leading Vicenza to promotion to Serie A. After a hesitant start, the red and whites proved to be overwhelming, thanks to Rossi's goals, the safety of libero Giorgio Carrera, the plays of Franco Cerilli and Giancarlo Salvi, Mario Guidetti in midfield, and the unstoppable Roberto Filippi.

=== Real Vicenza 1977–78 season: newly promoted and runners-up in Serie A ===
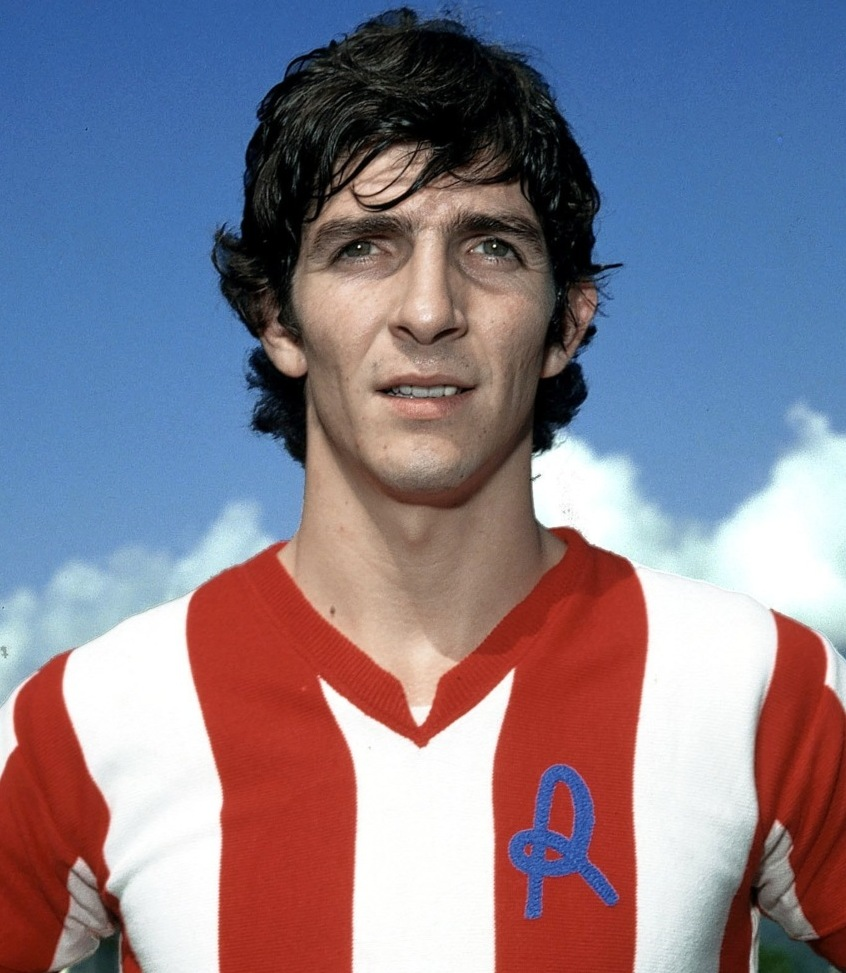
Paolo Rossi at Lanerossi Vicenza

Only Juventus did better than Lanerossi. The team finished the championship in 2nd place and made it to the UEFA Cup: it is still the best ever result by a newly promoted team in the history of the Italian top division. Paolo Rossi became the new phenomenon of Italian football: in December 1977 he was called up for the national team and at the end of the season he won the title of top scorer with 24 goals, a significant figure for a 16-team tournament. In June 1978 Rossi was part of the Italian team at the World Cup in Argentina, where the Azzurri finished fourth and the centre forward scored three goals.

On his return to Italy, the agreement of the player's co-ownership with Juventus had to be addressed, in retrospect a fundamental crossroads in the Biancorossi's future at the end of the 1970s. The deal was only resolved at the trade deadline, with record sums never committed before in a single football market session: Farina offered as much as 2,612,510,000 lire to secure the other half of Pablito's card. The considerable sums proved problematic for Vicenza's shrunken coffers, who were now forced to sell some of Fabbri's other best elements in order to recoup their investment in "Mr. Five Billion" Rossi, as well as facing discontent from the rest of the squad due to the different economic treatment reserved for them. In this difficult context, Farina's plans failed in the short space of a season: in its European debut, the team was eliminated in the first round of the 1978–1979 UEFA Cup by Czechoslovakia's Dukla Praga, while in Serie A, after never having found a real rhythm of play, it slowly slipped to the bottom of the table to an unthinkable relegation. Lanerossi thus found themselves in Serie B and, two years later, even in C1; meagre consolation was the winning, in the 1981–1982 season, of the Coppa Italia of Serie C.

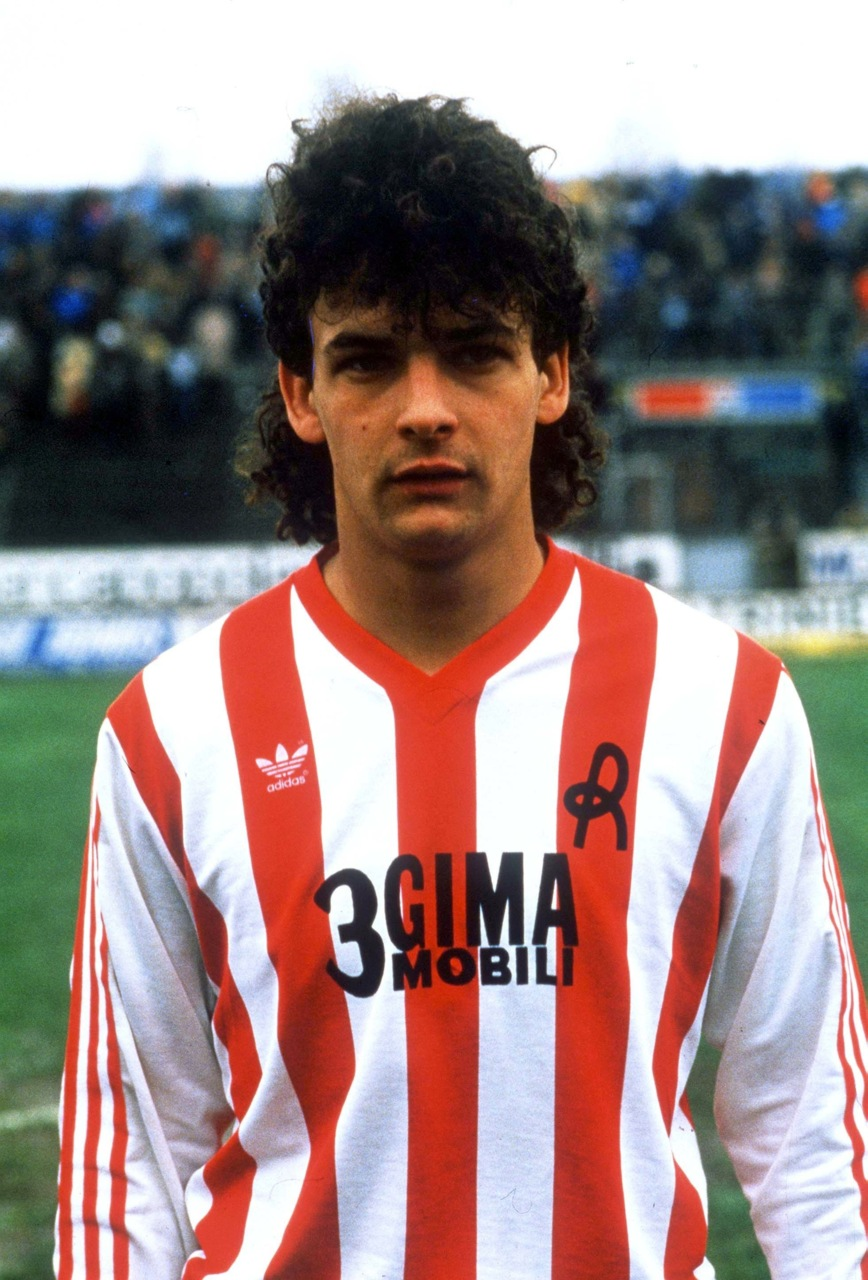
Roberto Baggio while playing at Vicenza

A young Roberto Baggio, born and raised in the province of Vicenza, made his professional football debut with Vicenza in the 1984–1985 championship after years in their youth sector. He would later become one of the best Italian football players in history.

On 16 June 1985, even with Baggio absent due to injury, on the neutral pitch of the Franchi in Florence, Vicenza, led by coach Bruno Giorgi, returned to Serie B after winning the promotion play-offs against Piacenza. The following season, it gained a third place in Serie B seemily reopening the doors of Serie A for Vicenza, however, the CAF annulled the club's promotion due to the club's involvement in a betting scandal: the blow was so strong for the Vicenza that in 1987 they fell back into Serie C1.

=== Vicenza Calcio ===
In the summer of 1989 the club, taken over by Pieraldo Dalle Carbonare, changed its name, bidding farewell to Lanerossi and its R, and becoming Vicenza Calcio. In the 1989–1990 season the team risked relegation to Serie C2, in a troubled year marked by three coaching changes. On 7 June 1990 Vicenza, led by flag-bearer Giulio Savoini, escaped relegation in a play-off match against Prato on the neutral pitch of the Mazza stadium in Ferrara, with the support of an exodus of "biancorossi" fans who invaded the Estense city. In 1990–1991 coach Giuseppe Caramanno was exonerated and Antonio Pasinato took over, but not even he managed to get Vicenza back into Serie B, a goal achieved two seasons later with Renzo Ulivieri. In 1993–1994, the Tuscan coach, despite not having any great strikers, managed to save Vicenza with a choral game that was to be the team's hallmark throughout that period. Even his successor, Francesco Guidolin, adopted a strategy aimed at emphasising the skills of the group and the play of the whole team rather than that of individual players. The following year, the performances of captain Giovanni Lopez, full-back Gilberto D'Ignazio Pulpito and centre-back Domenico Di Carlo brought Vicenza back to the top flight, where they finished ninth.

=== Winning of the 1996–97 Coppa Italia ===
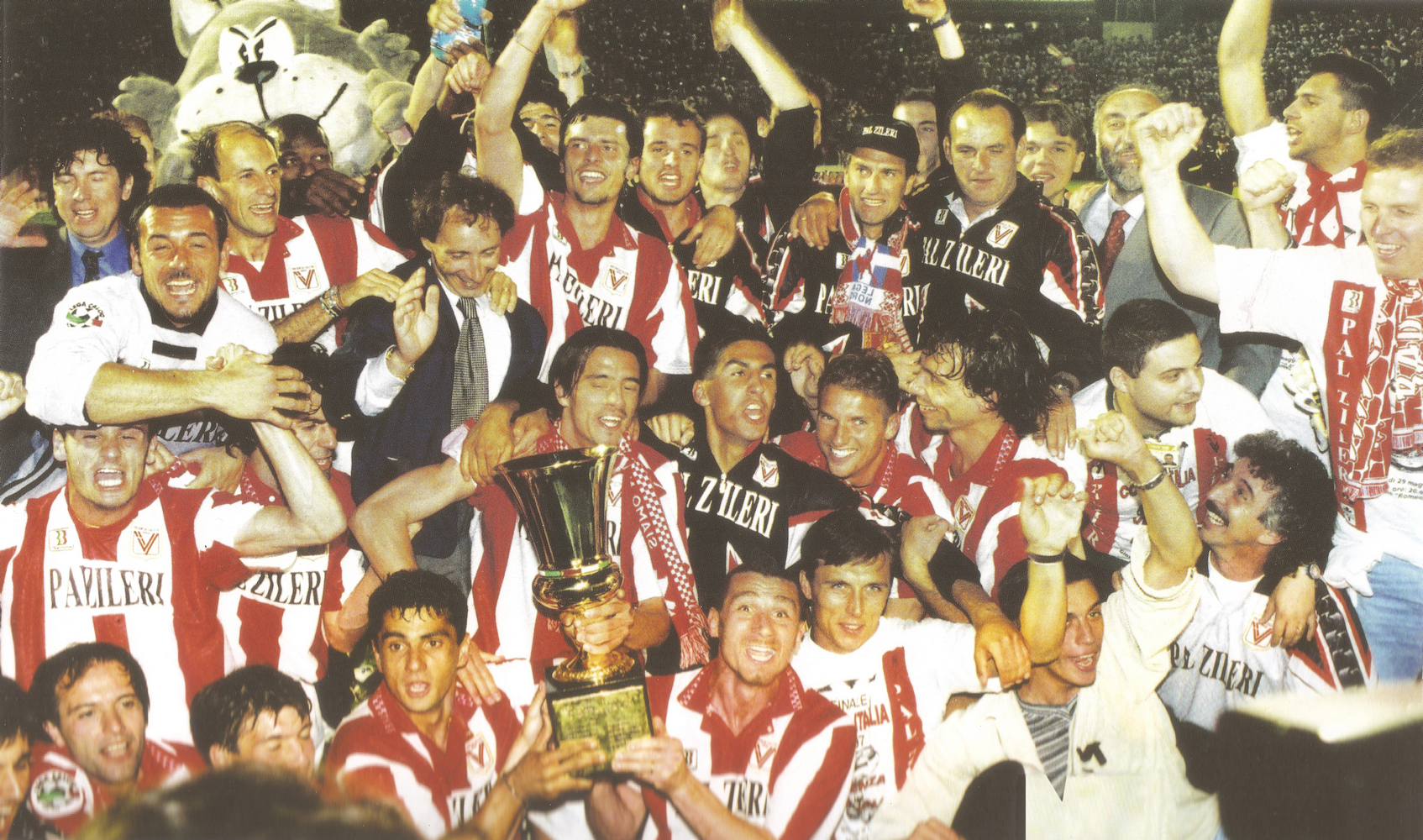
Thursday 29 May 1997 Vicenza Calcio after winning the 1996–1997 Coppa Italia

On Thursday 29 May 1997 Vicenza celebrated a historic victory of the 1996–97 Coppa Italia.

After a successful Serie A season, in which Vicenza were able to achieve victories against the "big three" Juventus, Inter and Milan, as well as being the league leaders for several weeks, the team catalysed national interest thanks to it being a revelation in the Coppa Italia, culminating in the final against Napoli: in the first leg, played at the San Paolo, the "biancorossi" lost 1–0, but in the return match, on 29 May 1997 at the Romeo Menti Stadium in Vicenza, Giampiero Maini immediately levelled the score; it then went into extra time where Maurizio Rossi and Alessandro Iannuzzi scored the remaining goals at the end of the match sealing a 3–0 final score and winning Vicenza the most important trophy in its history.

=== English ownership and UEFA Cup ===
In the summer of 1997, the ENIC Group (English National Investment Company) owned by Joe Lewis, took over the majority of the red and white club: Vicenza thus became the first Italian team to have foreign ownership. As holders of the Coppa Italia, the "biancorossi" earned the right to play in the Italian Super Cup, which they lost to Juventus on 23 August 1997 at the Stadio Delle Alpi in Turin. In the 1997–1998 season, after their eighth-place finish the year before, Vicenza saved themselves from relegation without any problems, but let themselves down a little in the Serie A, distracted by their commitment in the UEFA Cup Winners' Cup where, on the contrary, they surprised by reaching the semi-finals, losing only to Chelsea, who would later win the competition. Decisive in the European competition was the contribution of Pasquale Luiso, who would win top scorer of the cup.

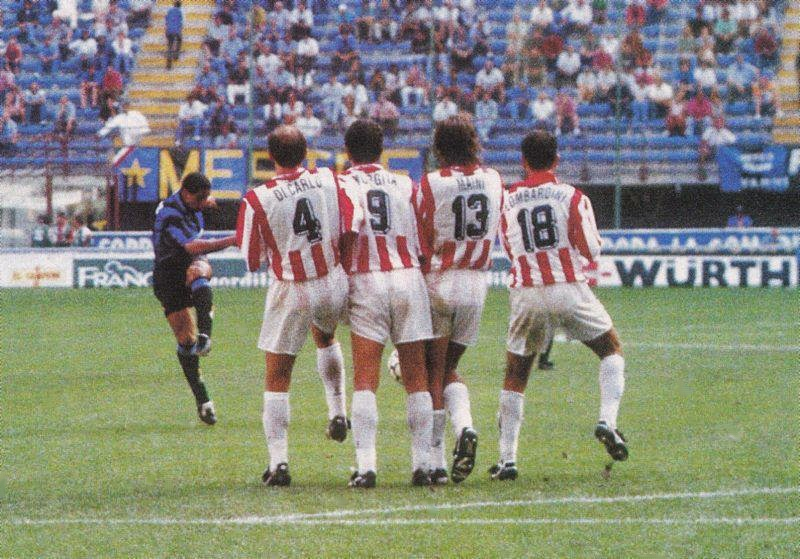
Vicenza against Inter Milan in the 1995–1996 Serie A

With Guidolin's farewell, the following year marked the end of a cycle, with a relegation to Serie B followed by immediate promotion back to the top league thanks to their win of the 1999–2000 Serie B championship, with coach Edoardo Rejaon and a prolific striker group in which Gianni Comandini, the usual Pasquale Luiso and the young Cristian Bucchi stood out. Their stay in Serie A lasted only a year, however, as the 2000–2001 season ended with relegation, this would be Vicenza's last season in Italy's top league.

=== Downfall ===
In December 2004 the club returned into the hands of local entrepreneurs when Sergio Cassingena became president. From this moment on, Vicenza's history saw a decade in Serie B made up of last-minute escapes from relegations and three relegations to Serie C, two of which, in 2005 and 2012, were later annulled due to sporting offences committed by other teams.

In 2013 this relatively successful decade ended with the definitive downgrading to Italy's third league due to cyclical financial problems, which led to a heavy deficit for the club. During the years in Serie C Vicenza was coached by the former "biancorosso" captain Giovanni Lopez. At the end of the 2013–2014 championship Vicenza lost the play-out against Savona to stay in Serie B, but was reinstated in Serie B as replacement for the bankrupt Siena. In the 2014–2015 Serie B the team rose to third place almost reaching Serie A, but fatally losing the play-offs against Pescara.

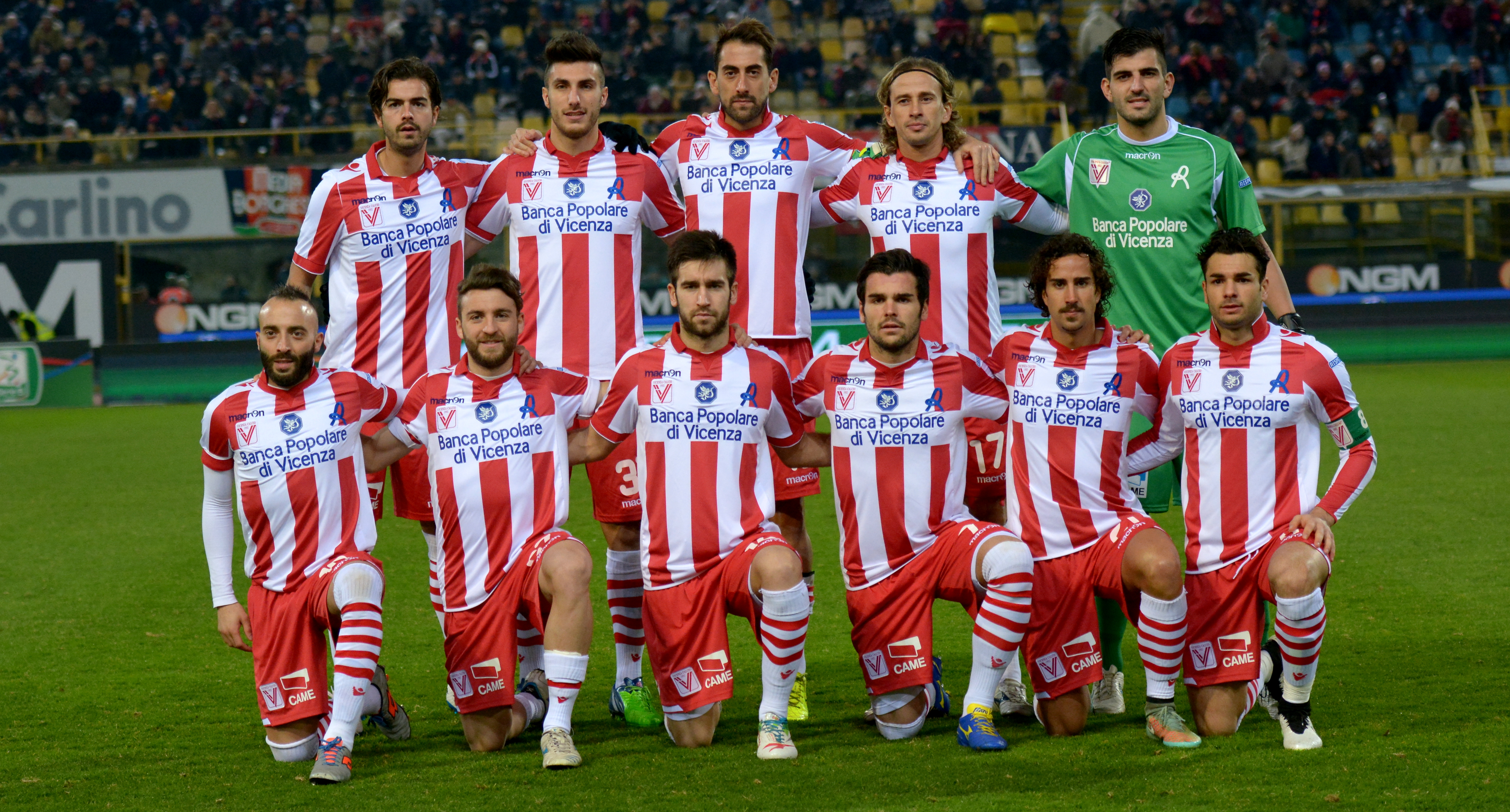
2014–15 Vicenza Calcio, team which almost reach promotion to Serie A

In 2017, the "biancorossi", were taken over by a new group of businessmen from Vicenza, relegated to Serie C, a fact that further exacerbated the club's economic crisis.

=== 2018: Bankruptcy and re-foundation ===
Declared bankrupt and placed on temporary administration, in 2018 Vicenza even risked relegation to Serie D, but managed to save itself by winning the relegation matches against Santarcangelo. Having definitively ceased activities, the club's sporting title was withdrawn by the Italian Football Federation.

At the end of the season, entrepreneur Renzo Rosso (president of the OTB Group and founder of Diesel) bought the corporate branch of Vicenza Calcio and assigning it to another football team he owned, Virtus Bassano, which, thanks to a federal procedure, moved from Bassano del Grappa to Vicenza and changed its name to L.R. Vicenza Virtus, becoming the de facto heir of the historical Vicenza football tradition. Vicenza could thus remained in Serie C and enrolled in the 2018–2019 championship using the Bassano's squad. The first year of Rosso's management ended with the qualification to the first round of the play-offs, played in Ravenna ending with a 1–1: this meant the elimination of the Vicentini due to the worst placement in the standings.

The 2019–2020 regular season, under the guidance of coach Domenico Di Carlo, a former biancorosso player, due to the early suspension of the season due to the COVID-19 pandemic, Vicenza was declared the winner of the Serie C division B (being first before the season ending) by the Federal Council of the Italian Football Federation, marking the official promotion of the club to Serie B.

The 2020–2021 season saw the "biancorossi" achieve an easy escape from relegation to Serie C; meanwhile, on 9 February 2021, the shareholders' meeting approved the change of the club's name to L.R. Vicenza.

In the 2021–2022 season, Vicenza found themselves at the back of the table, the season showed disagreements between the fan groups and the club, with the supporters expressing their disappointment for the lack of results and the absence of dialogue, while the management repeatedly retaliated harshly to them, pointing out the considerable investments made. Vicenza managed to avert direct relegation only on the last day of the regular season, but the descent to Serie C was finally sanctioned by a play-out loss against Cosenza.

The following season in Serie C the team performed below expectations, suffering many defeats that finally deprived them of the chance to fight for direct promotion; at the same time, however, on 12 April Vicenza won the 50th edition of the Coppa Italia Serie C against Juventus Next Gen.

The 2023/2024 season opened with new Coach Aimo Diana at the helm of the red and white team; after a first half of the season which was extremely below expectations, the exit from the Coppa Italia of Serie C against Rimini and a fan base in full protest, the arrival of Coach Stefano Vecchi on the bench changed things, with a record 23 consecutive useful results. The streak was interrupted by the defeat in the play-off final against Carrarese missing a Serie B promotion yet again. The following season, Vicenza was neck-and-neck with Calcio Padova in the race for the top spot in the league, ultimately finishing second and failing to progress beyond the play-off semi-finals.The 2025–2026 season saw the arrival of Fabio Gallo as head coach, who led the team to mathematically secure promotion to Serie B with six matches remaining, finishing 22 points ahead of the second-placed team.

== Colours and symbols ==
Since 1902, Vicenza's club colours have been white and red, the same colours of the city's emblem. The uniform used by the team in its home matches has traditionally consisted of a red and white jersey, combined with white shorts and socks, the latter with red tips.

Over the course of the club's history, the Vicenza uniform has undergone various changes. Initially, it was basically a shirt with very narrow lines, combined with red socks. Between the 1920s and 1930s, in addition to the aforementioned shirt, white shirts with a red horizontal band in the centre of the chest, or conversely red with a white central band, were also in use, together with red shorts; the central band would be eliminated in the following decade, leaving the uniform completely white. After the World War II, the Vicenza team often sported a wider palette than at the beginning of the 20th century.

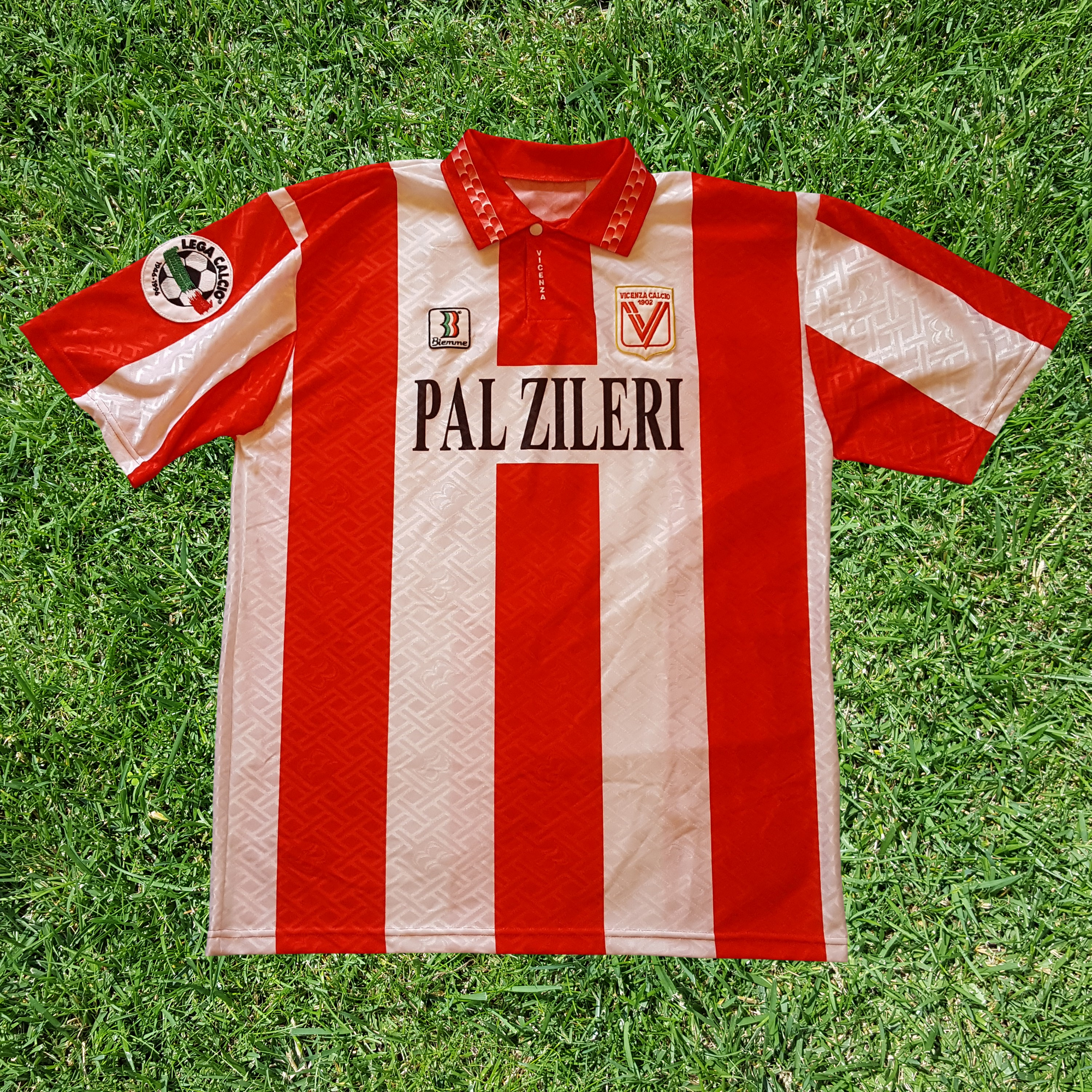
1996–1997 Vicenza home kit

Between the years 1963–1964 and 1966–1967 there was then a return to a jersey with very thick posts; in the last season a white jersey with a red diagonal bar was also worn. From the 1970s, the vertical posts returned to a standard width; with the end of the decade, Lanificio Rossi began to provide as second and third jerseys models with bright colours, including green, light blue, blue and yellow, very simple and minimal, marked only by the company's classic "R" affixed to the chest.

In the 1981–1982 season, the first official sponsor appeared on the red and white jerseys: Yuma Jeans, which remained there until the 1983–1984 season.

Until the 1995–1996 season, the jersey featured thicker lines; while from the 1996–1997 season to the 1998–1999 season the uniform appeared with fewer lines.

From the introduction of surnames (1995–1996 season) until the 2006–2007 season, the numbers and surnames in the club's home jerseys were black. Other colours of the numbers and surnames were red (season 2007–2008), white (seasons 2008–2009, 2013–2014, 2014–2015, 2015–2016 and 2016–2017), light blue (vintages 2010–2011 and 2017–2018) and gold (season 2011–2012).

In the 2012–2013 season, the fluorescent green second uniform was also sometimes used as the goalkeepers' uniform.

As far as stylistic variations, in the dark third jerseys produced by Biemme and Lotto, used in the mid-1990s, the two-tone collar of white and red was notable.

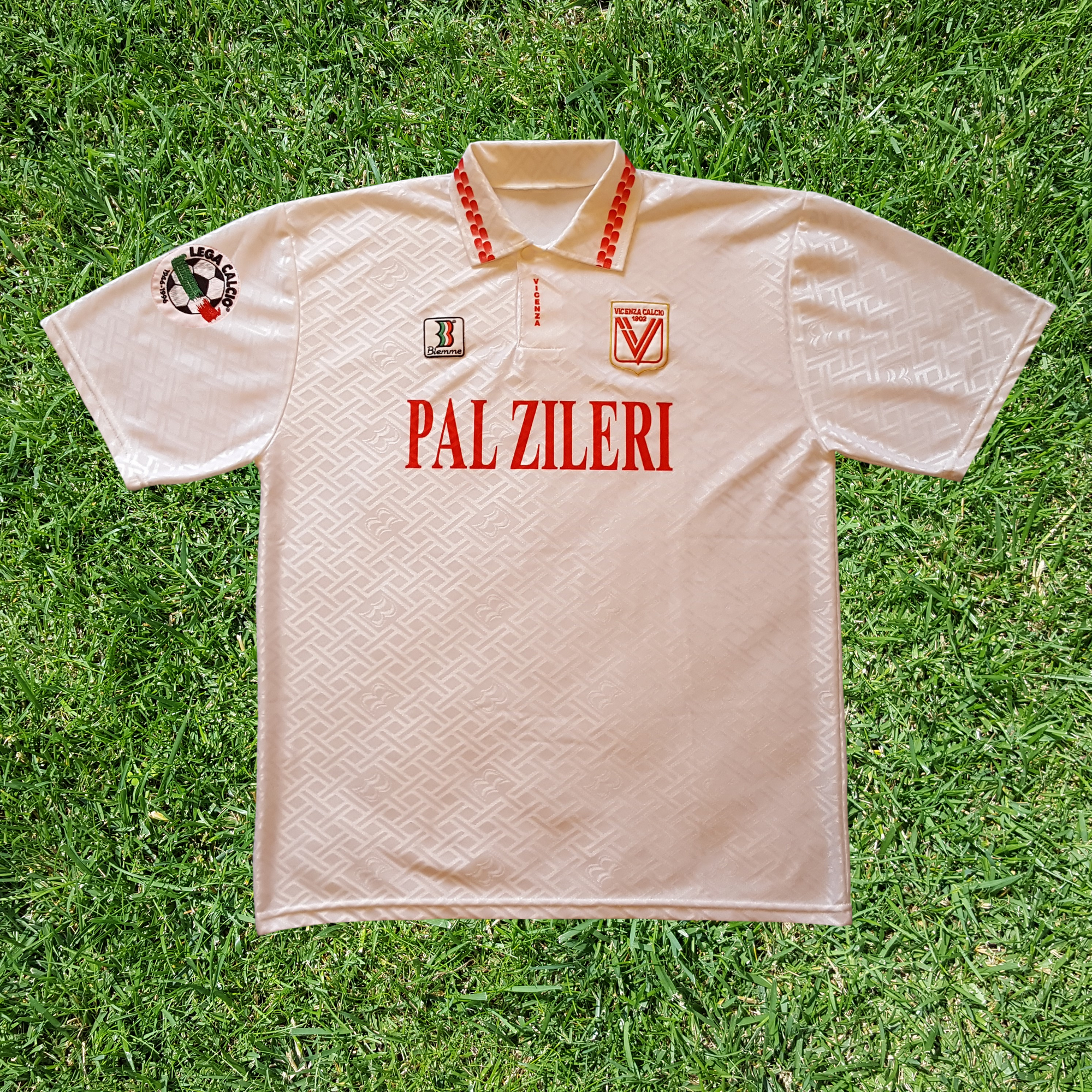
1996–1997 Vicenza away kit

In the 1996–1997 Serie A, goalkeeper Luca Mondini, being a rugby enthusiast, agreed with technical supplier Biemme, in wearing several extravagant customised jerseys with bichromatic horizontal stripes (green-and-white, yellow-and-yellow, blue-orange and red-and-white).

The 2001–2002 season was a celebration of Vicenza's hundred years since. To celebrate the centenary, Umbro developed a classic jersey: it featured the historic and iconic R on the left, and a mutation of the V logo, which became golden for that season and was placed in the centre of the jersey.

On the subject of jerseys, it remains curious what happened on 4 October 2008 at the Omobono Tenni Stadium in Treviso: the match Cittadella- Vicenza started with several minutes of delay because the referee Riccardo Tozzi made the Vicenza players change their jersey, chromatically similar to that of Cittadella, so the warehouseman of Vicenza ran to buy phosphorescent yellow jerseys in a shop in Treviso outside the stadium, with the inconvenience of the wrong numbering that did not correspond to the real number of Vicenza players, in addition to the lack of the surnames written on the back.

Vicenza's 2012–2013 kits

In the 2016–2017 season on the occasion of the 20th anniversary of the winning of the 1996–1997 Coppa Italia, a celebratory coat of arms was featured on Vicenza's jersey to commemorate the historic victory of the tricolour cockade.

Starting from the 2020–2021 season on the back of the shirts, above the surnames sits Vicenza's provincial coat of arms, inside which the four military shrines of the First World War which Vicenza hosts (the Ossario del Pasubio, the Ossario del Cimone, the Ossario di Asiago and the Ossario del Grappa) are depicted in the four corners, while in the centre there's a golden pole surmounted by the city coat of arms consisting of the silver-plated white cross on a red background.

In the history of Vicenza, because of the prestigious goals achieved by these team, the two most iconic jerseys remain those of Real Vicenza, which came close to winning the Serie A in the 1977–1978 season, and that of Francesco Guidolin's Vicenza of miracles in the mid-1990s with sponsor Pal Zileri.

Origins	1920–1930s	1930–1940s	1940–1960s	1960–1970s	1970s-present

=== Official symbols ===
==== Badge ====
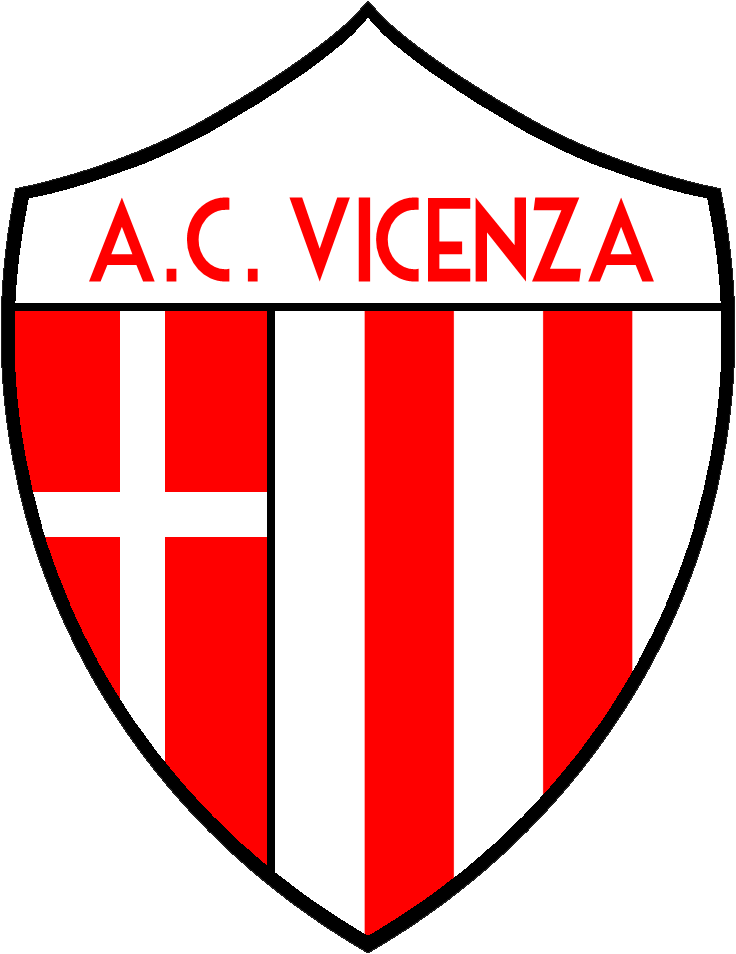
Original badge of ACIVI (Associazione Calcio in Vicenza) 1902–1953

From 1902, the year of its foundation, to the 1952–1953 season, the club used as its symbol a Swiss shield on left with a white cross on a red field (borrowed from the heraldic coat of arms of the city of Vicenza), right palato in white and red. The cuspidal band, on a white background, bore the inscription A.C. VICENZA in red letters.

In the 1953–1954 season (following the acquisition from Lanerossi) a truncated ancile took its place: in the upper field, on a white background, was inscribed the changed company name LANEROSSI A.C. VICENZA (in gold letters), while in the lower field, on a white and red palate background, stood out the famous knotted R (in gold), symbol of the Schio textile company.

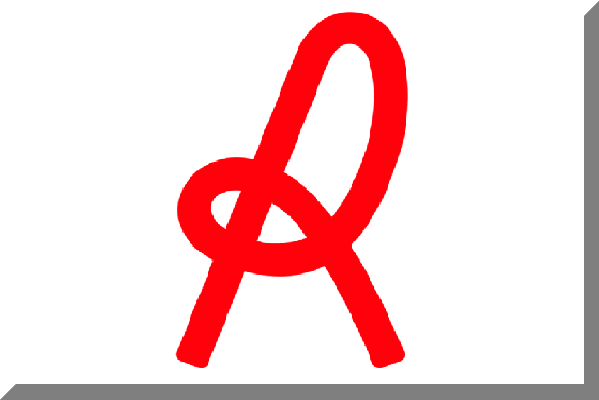
The Lanerossi 'R'

The R of Lanerossi remained the only crest on the team's jerseys until the 1988–1989 season.

In 1989, following the end of the "Lanerossi season" and the change of name to Vicenza Calcio, the artist Antonio "Toni" Vedù of Anonima Magnagati designed a new crest: it was basically a modern white French shield bordered in red, almost completely occupied by a large red V with a white stripe inside, which on the left changed to a cross (evoking the town's heraldry). At the top was the inscription VICENZA CALCIO 1902, in red letters.

Following an agreement with the Marzotto group (which had become the owner of Lanerossi), in the 2001–2002 season (to coincide with the centenary of the club's foundation) the R of Lanerossi returned on the red and white uniforms. Following the renewal of the agreement, from the 2006–2007 season it returned to being an integral part of the Vicenza jerseys, becoming a sort of "secondary crest".

The current logo L.R Vicenza logo

In 2018, following the bankruptcy of Vicenza Calcio, the team's successor, Renzo Rosso and OTB's L.R. Vicenza Virtus chose to discontinue the 1989 emblem in favour of leaving only the R, which thus returned to being the actual team crest. A new emblem was thus conceived (used solely for administrative and communication purposes, and not on the jerseys), in which the Lanerossi symbol is inserted in a circle, below it stands the writing L.R. VICENZA 1902, in black.

==== Anthem ====
The club's official anthem is the Inno biancorosso, the main and historical anthem of the fans. It is the oldest and dates back to the early 1960s. It was created at the request of the Lanerossi owners who, after being the first Italian company to buy a Serie A football team, wanted to leave a further mark on Vicenza's football history. This anthem is still sung at the stadium today (albeit some adaptations made by the fans). In 2018, following the club's re-foundation, this anthem became the official anthem again, being performed at home matches.

In addition to this there are several other songs:

- "Grande Vicenza 1902–1992 90" anni, anthem composed in 1992 on the occasion of Vicenza's 90 years of history;
- "Cuore biancorosso", an anthem recorded for charity purposes sung in 1997 by coach Francesco Guidolin and the biancorossi players, to celebrate the victory of the 1996–1997 Coppa Italia;
- "Fedeli alla tribù", a song written by the Vicenza punk rock band Derozer in honour of Vicenza's away match at Stamford Bridge in London against Chelsea in the semi-final of the 1997–1998 UEFA Cup Winners' Cup;
- "Forza Vicenza avanti Vicenza forza Vicenza campione Vicenza", an anthem composed in recent years by Argentine biancorosso fan Miguel Angel Regalado;
- "Vicenza cuore biancorosso", an anthem composed by DJ Manuel Negrin in 2012 and sung by Luca Menti; the title was chosen through a poll on the official website of Vicenza Calcio, being played in the 2010s during the entrance of the biancorossi players onto the pitch at the Menti stadium and at the end of matches.

==== Mascot ====
Vicenza has its own official mascot: Gatton Gattoni. Its history began during the 1994–1995 Serie B championship when a Vicenza advertising agency decided to create an image to associate with the football team: the idea was to choose a comic character who could sum up a representative image for the people of Vicenza together with the white and red colours.

A cat was chosen, personified in a player wearing a Vicenza shirt. At the end of the championship Vicenza was promoted to Serie A and for this reason Gatton Gattoni immediately became the lucky charm of the team and the fans. If at first the agency chose to give the mascot an exclusively papery guise (he appeared in the team's newspaper and on the fans' flyers) and poster art, they finally came up with the creation of a two and a half-metre tall mascot that entertained the spectators by walking around the playing field at every match. Gatton Gattoni physically took the field on 12 May 1996, during the last championship match, when Vicenza drew 2–2 at home against Sampdoria. Shortly afterwards, every Vicenza Calcio initiative was attended by the official mascot. Gatton Gattoni also became a merchandising product line for Vicenza Calcio. His popularity in the world of football is now national as well as being the first example of an official mascot of a Serie A club. The mascot's presence during matches and official events continued until 2018 when Vicenza Calcio went bankrupt.

== Stadium and training facilities ==
The first stadium in which the then A.C. Vicenza played was the Borgo Casale field in the eastern part of the city. It was a simple football field without stands or bleachers where the biancorossi players took their first steps. The interruption due to the First World War led the club to look for a new area where they could play their matches.

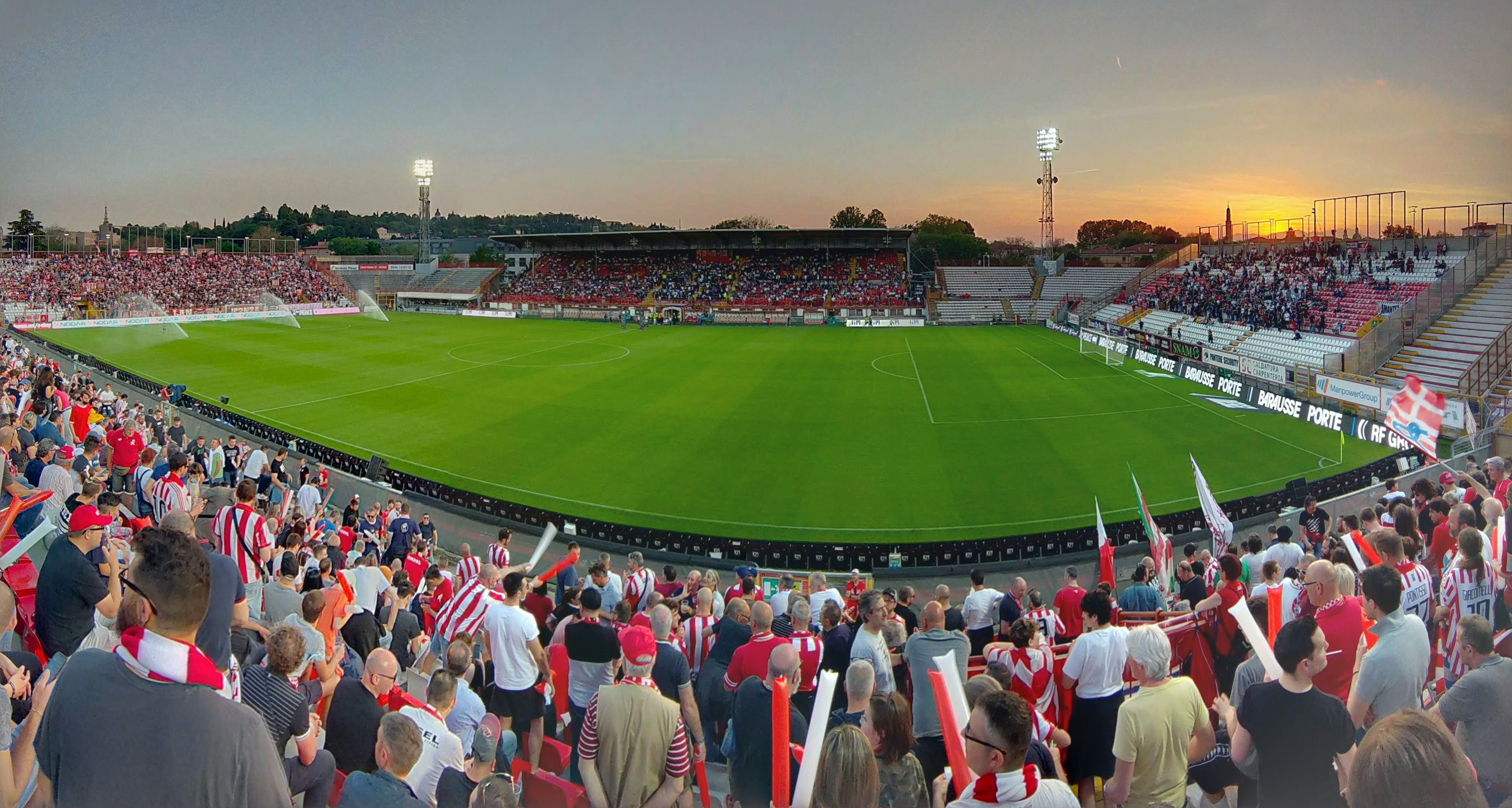
Stadio Romeo Menti 2022 panorama

In 1919, a new stadium was built in San Felice (west of the Vicenza), which, for the time, was a modern sports facility with a wooden grandstand and changing rooms. During the 1920s, the grandstand was then built in concrete and the changing rooms were moved to the space below. It was inaugurated on Sunday 22 June 1919 with the friendly match Vicenza – Triestina. It was nicknamed stadio dea carbonea (charcoal stadium) because, to level out the grooves left by the iron studs, they used to cover them with charcoal and pyrite taken from the nearby foundries.

Since 1935, the team has played its home matches at the Romeo Menti stadium, which has always been municipal property.

The stadium was initially called Campo Sportivo del Littorio, in line with the fascist influences of the time. Inaugurated on the city's patron saint's day on 8 September with a match between Vicenza and Soroksár of Budapest, it was subsequently damaged by bombings during the Second World War, renovated in a few months (with the elimination of the athletics track) and renamed, in 1946, to Municipal.

After the Superga air disaster in which Romeo Menti, born in Vicenza and a former Vicenza footballer, lost his life, the city decided, in 1949, to name the stadium after him.

It has undergone several renovations and adaptations over the years. It is a typical "English-style" stadium, with stands and bleachers very close to the pitch. While reaching highs of hosting 30,000 spectators in the 1970s it currently holds a maximum of 12,000 spectators.

=== Training centre ===
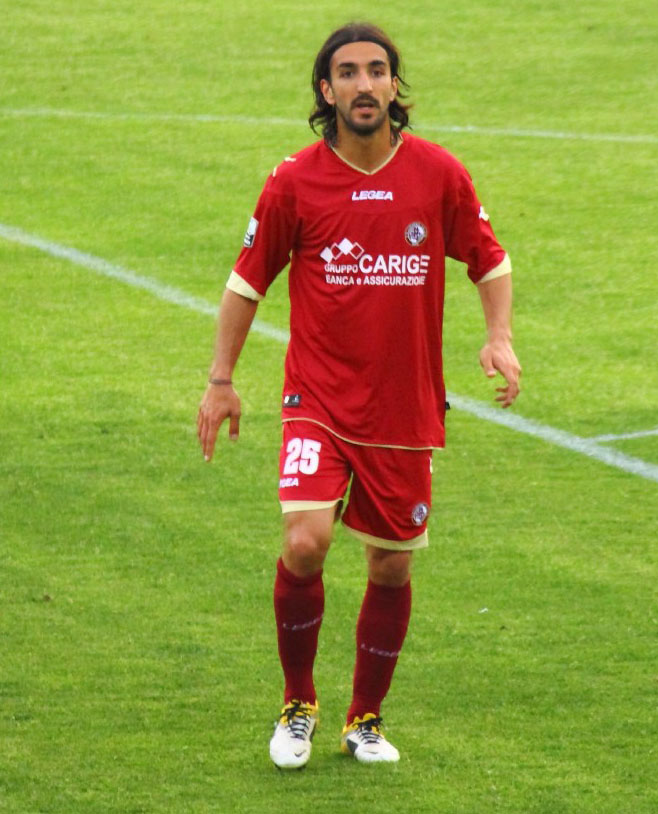
Piermario Morosini to whom the training center was dedicated

From 2006 to 2017, the club used a modern technical centre, located in Isola Vicentina, called the Centro Tecnico Piermario Morosini.

The structure was developed over a total area of 65,000 square metres and was divided into two symmetrical units, one reserved for the First Team with dressing rooms, warehouse, medical rooms, gymnasium and annexed managerial offices and meeting rooms and a conference room, and one dedicated to the youth sector with the same services, as well as a large regulation gymnasium for indoor work and major events. Outside, the area was structured into five football pitches for training, four of which were grass pitches and an additional clay one.

After his untimely death, the club decided to name the Technical Centre after Piermario Morosini (as he had been a Vicenza footballer for three seasons).

Following the club's bankruptcy, the Technical Centre, which has been owned since its construction in 2006 by the company Sporting Club Isola srl (which also went bankrupt) with regard the structure and River srl with the 5 football pitches, was abandoned.

After training at the municipal sports facilities of Capovilla di Caldogno, since October 2021 the first team has been training at the new training centre called Sporting Club 55 owned by OTB Group, the holding company that controls the club and located in Fellette di Romano d'Ezzelino, on the slopes of Monte Grappa. The new facility, which housed the youth sector since 2018, is equipped with an exclusive area for LR Vicenza and another multipurpose area open to the public, as well as a guest house equipped with rooms and areas, partly exclusive and partly common. The sports centre is equipped with two regulation football pitches with a grandstand, a football pitch with synthetic grass, two 6 vs 6 football pitches with synthetic grass, three 5 vs 5 football pitches with synthetic grass (covered for the winter season), six padel pitches covered for the winter season, four clay tennis courts (two of which are covered), two beach volleyball courts, two swimming pools and a hydro-massage pool. Inside, the centre has a 300 square metre gym, a wellness area with a Turkish bath and rooms dedicated to massages and therapies. The centre is then completed with changing rooms, meeting and video rooms and a bistro area.

== Company structure ==
The club offices are located at Largo Paolo Rossi 9, in a building inside the Stadio Romeo Menti area. Opposite the company offices is Casa Vicenza, a club house built in 2017 with a hospitality area and press room.

=== Company structure ===
L.R. Vicenza is a joint-stock company (SpA); since 29 May 2018 it has been owned by the Vicenza-based OTB Group of Breganze, the holding company of entrepreneur Renzo Rosso. In addition to OTB Group (which holds the majority share), several other companies or entrepreneurs from Vicenza have been shareholders of L.R. Vicenza since 18 February 2019, including Better Silver Spa, Cleops Srl (investment company of Zambon Group Farmaceutici), Dainese Spa, Futura (holding company of the Chilese family), Marcello Cestaro, OMIS Spa, Paolo Scaroni, Pelletterie Sagi Srl, QDB Srl, Rino Mastrotto and SIPE Spa (Maltauro Group).

==== Ownerships ====
- 1902–1953 (Italy) Shared player ownership
- 1953–1989 (Italy) Lanerossi Spa
- 1989–1997 (Italy) Pieraldo Dalle Carbonare
- 1997–2004 (United Kingdom) ENIC Group
- 2004–2016 (Italy) Finalfa Srl
- 2016–2017 (Italy) Vi.Fin. Spa
- 2017–2018 (Italy) Vicenza bankruptcy court
- 2018–present (Italy) OTB Group Spa

==== Current company structure ====
- President: Stefano Rosso
- general manager: Werner Seeber
- Sports Director: Luca Matteassi
- Sports Secretary: Simone Marconato
- Management Secretary: Sofia Pagiusco
- Finance Manager: Elisabetta Alzeni
- Administration: Federico Marchesini, Stefano Bizzotto
- Communication and Marketing Manager: Sara Vivian
- Graphics: Stefano Sartore
- Digital account: Francesco Salomon
- Merchandising: Luca Franceschini
- Sales Manager: Nicola Rossi
- Sales: Vladimiro Arcoma, Federico Hanard
- Marketing and Sales Secretariat: Giovanni Cittadin
- Scouting: Riccardo Polacco
- Ticketing: Giulia Pozzan
- Switchboard: Milica Stevanovic
- Stadium and Logistics: Sergio Valerio, Roberto Filippi, Elena Giavatto
- Warehouse: Ivana Spallino, Fabrizio Zordan, Paola Marenda
- Security Delegate: Gianluca Miozzi
- R.S.P.: Giuseppe Gangi
- S.L.O.: Michele Zanotto

== Youth sector ==
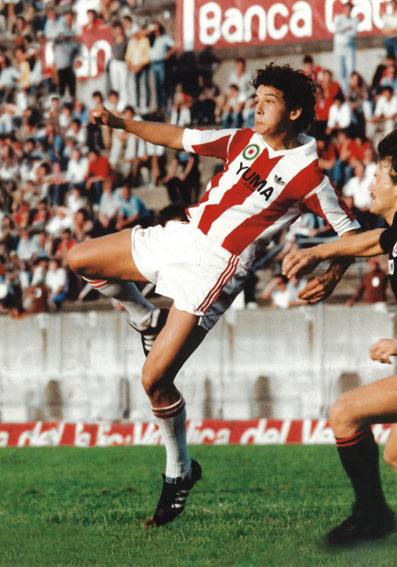
A young Roberto Baggio during the 1982–1983 Lanerossi Vicenza season

The club's youth sector boasts two consecutive victories in the Viareggio Tournament, in 1954 and 1955.

It is divided into four areas

- Competitive activity, with teams that participate in the Primavera or Berretti championships, U17, U16, U15, U14 and U13 youth teams;
- Grassroots activities, which groups together the Beginners and Pupils teams;
- Football School, which groups the primi calci (7–8 years old) and the piccoli amici (5–6 years old)* Vicenza Academy, which is the affiliation of almost 40 football clubs in the Veneto region to LR Vicenza with the aim of developing young talent also through scouts (each scout has his own working area, even outside the region).

Over the decades, the biancorosso nursery has nurtured numerous players who have gone on to play in the first team, from the club's early days to the present day. Among those who started at Vicenza are Vicenza native Roberto Baggio (considered one of the best players in the history of world football, winner of the 1993 Ballon d'Or), Gino Vallesella (the first biancorosso captain), brothers and Vicenza natives Umberto Menti and Romeo Menti and their nephew Luigi Menti (second all-time for appearances and first for appearances in the top division in the Vicenza jersey), Alberto Marchetti (seventh all-time for appearances and third among goal scorers), Bruno Quaresima (tenth all-time for appearances and second among scorers), Mirko Pavinato, Giancarlo Fusato, Renzo Cappellaro, Nevio Scala, Massimo Briaschi, Giorgio Sterchele, Nicola Zanini, Paolo Zanetti and Luca Rigoni.

Between the end of the 1990s and the beginning of the 2000s, mention must be made of Christian Maggio from Vicenza: having grown up in the Vicenza youth sector, he made his debut in the first team on the first day of the 2000–2001 Serie A, establishing himself in the following years elsewhere and in the senior national team.

The youth teams train in Vicenza in the facilities of Via Gagliardotti, Stanga, Saviabona, San Pio X, Bertesinella and Pomari, while in Bassano in the facilities of Cartigliano, Centro Giovanile and Sporting 55.

In recent years several former biancorossi players at the end of their careers have decided to coach the different areas of the youth sector.

=== Current youth sector structure ===
- Sector Manager: Michele Nicolin
- Youth Sector Secretary: Gabriele Stevanin
- Responsible for Basic Activities Area Vicenza: Davide De Pretto
- Responsible for Basic Activities Area Bassano del Grappa: Claudio Conte
- Youth Sector Technical Manager: Lorenzo Simeoni
- Responsible for the Football School: Luigi Zanetti
- Primavera Coach: Lorenzo Simeon
- Assistant Coach: Andrea Rabito
- Managers: Giuseppe Sammarco, Bortolo Broglio, Fulvio Benetti, Rino Quagliato
- Athletic trainers coordinator: Paolo Guderzo
- Goalkeeping trainers: Carlo Gelmetti, Massimo Mattiazzo, Mirko Muraro
- Doctor: Dr. Paolo Vialetto
- Physiotherapists: Dr. Agostino Padovan, Dr. Paolo Dal Ferro
- Injury prevention and recovery: Beniamino Dalla Riva
- Videoanalysts: Lorenzo Favaro, Alvise Scarpa
- Sport mental trainer: Guido Bresolin
- Under-17 coach: Luca Rigoni (former Vicenza player)
- Under 16 coach: Guido Belardinelli
- Under 15 coach: Diego Bistore

== Honours ==
=== Domestic ===
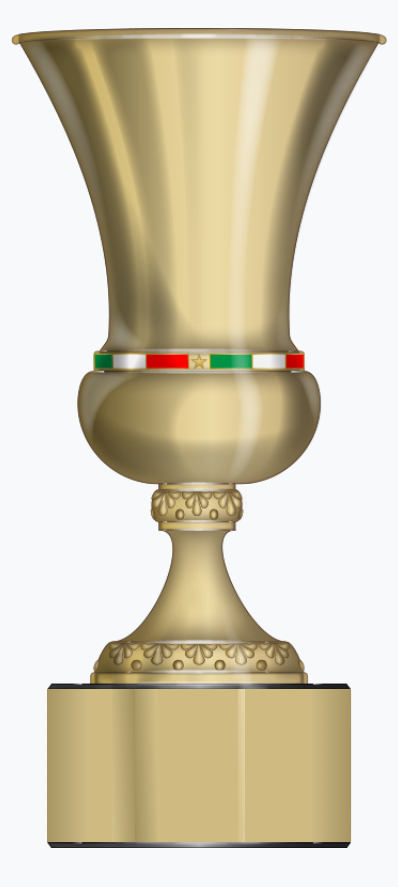
The Coppa Italia trophy

==== Cups ====
- Coppa Italia
  - Winners: 1996–97
- Coppa Italia Serie C
  - Winners: 1981–82, 2022–23

==== League ====
- Serie B
  - Winners: 1954–55, 1976–77, 1999–2000
- Serie C
  - Winners: 1932–33, 1939–40, 2019–20, 2025–26

=== International ===
- Benelux Cup
  - Winners: 1961
- Uhrencup
  - Winners: 1965

== In Europe competitions ==
=== UEFA Cup Winners' Cup ===
Season	Round	Club	Home	Away	Aggregate
1997–98	First round	(Poland) Legia Warsaw	2–0	1–1	3–1
1997–98	Second round	(Ukraine) FC Shakhtar Donetsk	2–1	3–1	5–2
1997–98	Quarter-finals	(Netherlands) Roda JC Kerkrade	5–0	4–1	9–1
1997–98	Semi-finals	(England) Chelsea F.C	1–0	1–3	2–3

=== UEFA Cup ===
Season	Round	Club	Home	Away	Aggregate
1978–79	First round	(Czech Republic) Dukla Prague	1–1	0–1	1–2

== Divisional movements ==
Series	Years	Last	Promotions	Relegations
A	30	2000–01	–	▼6 (1922, 1948, 1975, 1979, 1999, 2001)
B	38	2026–27	▲5 (1942, 1955, 1977, 1995, 2000)	▼8 (1923, 1926, 1935, 1981, 1987, 2013, 2017, 2022)
C	26	2025–26	▲8 (1924, 1933, 1940, 1985, 1993, 2014, 2020, 2026)	▼1 (1928)
94 out of 95 years of professional football in Italy since 1929
Founding member of the Football League's First Division in 1921
D	1	1929–30	▲1 (1930)	never

== Players ==
=== Current squad ===
As of 10 September 2026

Note: Flags indicate national team as defined under FIFA eligibility rules; some limited exceptions apply. Players may hold more than one non-FIFA nationality.

No.	Pos.	Nation	Player
1	GK	ITA	Fabrizio Bagheria
4	MF	ITA	Marco Carraro
5	DF	ITA	Riccardo Marchizza
6	DF	FRA	Maxime Leverbe
7	FW	ITA	Nicola Rauti
8	MF	ITA	Alessandro Bellemo
9	FW	ITA	Claudio Morra
10	MF	ITA	Mattia Valoti
11	FW	ITA	Gabriele Moncini
14	DF	ITA	Giuseppe Cuomo
16	GK	ITA	Riccardo Gagno
21	MF	ITA	Tommaso Corazza (on loan from Bologna)
23	DF	ITA	Nicolò Brighenti
24	FW	ITA	Filippo Alessio

No.	Pos.	Nation	Player
26	MF	ITA	Giulio Pellizzari
27	DF	ITA	Thomas Sandon
28	DF	ITA	Lorenzo Caferri
29	MF	ITA	Loris Zonta
30	DF	ITA	Matteo Vescovi
32	DF	ITA	Filippo Costa
33	FW	ALB	Silvio Merkaj
44	MF	ITA	Raul Talarico
66	DF	ITA	Andrea Papetti
68	GK	ITA	Elia Tantalocchi
74	FW	ITA	Frank Tsadjout
77	MF	ALB	Armand Rada
99	MF	ITA	Alessandro Pietrelli (on loan from Juventus Next Gen)

=== Out on loan ===
Note: Flags indicate national team as defined under FIFA eligibility rules; some limited exceptions apply. Players may hold more than one non-FIFA nationality.

No.	Pos.	Nation	Player
—	GK	ITA	Mattia Basso (at Calcio Sandonà until 30 June 2027)

=== Retired numbers ===
3– (Italy) Giulio Savoini

25– (Italy) Piermario Morosini, (2007–09, 2011)– posthumorously awarded.

=== Notable former players ===
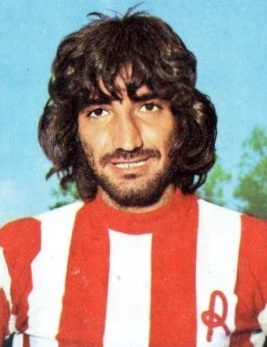
Ezio Vendrame at Lanerossi Vicenza

- (Italy) Ezio Vendrame
- (Italy) Paolo Rossi
- (Italy) Roberto Baggio

== Notable former managers ==
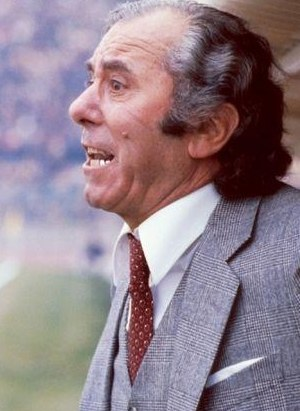
Giovan Battista Fabbri who coached Vicenza and Paolo Rossi to almost winning the Serie A in 1977–1978

There have been 75 coaches who have taken on the technical leadership of Vicenza since 1902. Among their nationalities, Italian prevails.

The first coach in the history of the biancorossa was Antonio Libero Scarpa, who led the team from 1902 to 1908; he was also president of Vicenza from 1903 to 1908.

The one with the longest tenure is still Giulio Fasolo from Vicenza, who remained at the helm of the team for 10 seasons, seven of which were consecutive, from 1908 to 1909 to 1914–1915, and following the activity suspended between 1915 and 1919 due to the exposure of the Vicenza area on the front line of the First World War, he was once again coach from 1919 to 1920 to 1921–1922. Giulio Fasolo was coach when the Vicenza team came close to winning the Scudetto in the 1910–1911 season.

There were many foreign coaches in the 1920s and 1930s, the first in the Biancorossa's history being Austrian Franz Sedlacek, who led the team in the 1922–1923 season.

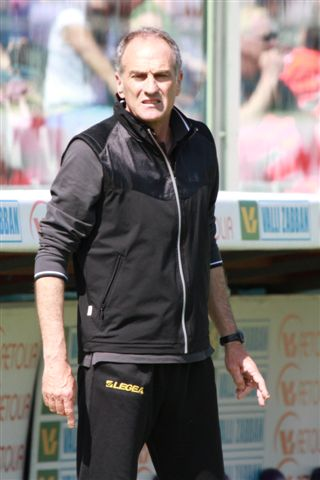
Francesco Guidolin who coached Vicenza to its 1996–1997 Coppa Italia victory

Among the foreign coaches, those who boast the highest number of presences on the red and white bench are the Hungarians Wilmas Wilhelm and Imre Janos Bekey and the Uruguayan Hector Puricelli.

A coach who marked the biancorossa's history was Giovan Battista Fabbri. A Vicenza coach from 1976 to 1979, he was at the helm of the Vicenza team that came close to winning the Serie A in the 1977–1978 season. The Emilian coach had the intuition of moving Paolo Rossi from right winger to prolific centre forward.

Francesco Guidolin coached Vicenza from 1994 to 1998, winning the 1996–97 Coppa Italia and reaching the semi-finals of the 1997–98 UEFA Cup Winners' Cup. During his years at Vicenza he normally favoured the 4–4–2, while in some delicate matches, played on defensive tactics, he opted for the 4–5–1 and 5–4–1.

Under the leadership of Edoardo Reja, at the end of the 1999–2000 season, the team achieved promotion to Serie A for the last time.

Both players and coaches of Vicenza (in chronological order) were: Giulio Fasolo, Aldo Casalini, Wilmas Wilhelm, Eraldo Bedendo, Pietro Spinato, Umberto Menti, Roberto Lerici, Antonio Pin, Chinesinho, Giulio Savoini, Ernesto Galli, Fabio Viviani, Giancarlo Camolese, Massimo Beghetto, Manlio Zanini, Alessandro Dal Canto, Giovanni Lopez, Nicola Zanini and Domenico Di Carlo.

Below is the list of coaches from the year of foundation to the present day.

- (Germany) Otto Krappan (1933–34)
- (Hungary) József Viola (1934–36)
- (Hungary) András Kuttik (1937–39)
- (Hungary) Elemér Berkessy (1948–49)
- (Italy) Alfredo Mazzoni (1950–51)
- (Italy) Fulvio Bernardini (1951–53)
- (Italy) Aldo Campatelli (1954–55)
- (Hungary) (Austria) Béla Guttmann (1955–56)
- (Italy) Roberto Lerici (1957–62)
- (Italy) Giovanni Varglien (1957–58)
- (Italy) Aldo Campatelli (1965–66)
- (Italy) Umberto Menti (1967)
- (Italy) Arturo Silvestri (1967–68)
- (Italy) Umberto Menti (1968)
- (Italy) Ettore Puricelli (1969–71)
- (Italy) Umberto Menti (1971–72)
- (Italy) Ettore Puricelli (1973–75)
- (Brazil) Chinesinho (1976)
- (Italy) Giovan Battista Fabbri (1976–79)
- (Italy) Renzo Ulivieri (1979–80)
- (Italy) Giancarlo Cadé (1981–83)
- (Italy) Bruno Mazzia (1982–83)
- (Italy) Bruno Giorgi (1983–86)
- (Italy) Tarcisio Burgnich (1986–87)
- (Italy) Romano Fogli (1989–90)
- (Italy) Renzo Ulivieri (1991–94)
- (Italy) Francesco Guidolin (1994–98)
- (Italy) Franco Colomba (1998–99)
- (Italy) Edoardo Reja (1998–01)
- (Italy) Eugenio Fascetti (2001–02)
- (Italy) Adelio Moro (2001–02)
- (Italy) Andrea Mandorlini (2002–03)
- (Italy) Giuseppe Iachini (2003–04)
- (Italy) Gianfranco Bellotto (2004–05)
- (Italy) Giancarlo Camolese (2005–06)
- (Italy) Angelo Gregucci (2006–09)
- (Italy) Rolando Maran (2009–11)
- (Italy) Nedo Sonetti (2010)
- (Italy) Silvio Baldini (2011)
- (Italy) Luigi Cagni (2011–12)
- (Italy) Massimo Beghetto (2012)
- (Italy) Luigi Cagni (2012)
- (Italy) Roberto Breda (2012–13)
- (Italy) Alessandro Dal Canto (2013)
- (Italy) Giovanni Lopez (2013–14)
- (Italy) Pasquale Marino (2014–16)
- (Italy) Franco Lerda (2016)
- (Italy) Pierpaolo Bisoli (2016–17)
- (Italy) Vincenzo Torrente (2017)
- (Italy) Alberto Colombo (2017)
- (Italy) Nicola Zanini (2017–18)
- (Italy) Franco Lerda (2018)
- (Italy) Nicola Zanini (2018)
- (Italy) Giovanni Colella (2018–19)
- (Italy) Michele Serena (2019)
- (Italy) Giovanni Colella (2019)
- (Italy) Domenico Di Carlo (2019–21)
- (Italy) Cristian Brocchi (2021–22)
- (Italy) Francesco Baldini (2022)
- (Italy) Francesco Modesto (2022–23)
- (Denmark) Dan Thomassen (2023)
- (Italy) Aimo Diana (2023)
- (Italy) Stefano Vecchi (2023–)

== Kit manufacturer and sponsors ==
=== Kit manufacturers ===
- 1970–1971 Umbro
- 1978–1992 Adidas
- 1992–1995 Virma
- 1995–1997 Biemme
- 1997–1998 Lotto
- 1998–1999 Biemme
- 1999–2002 Umbro
- 2002–2005 Biemme
- 2005–2007 A–Line
- 2007–2009 Diadora
- 2009–2012 Max Sport
- 2012–2018 Macron
- 2018–2022 Lotto
- 2022–2025 Fila
- 2025– Hummel

=== Sponsors ===
- 1981–1984 Yuma Jeans
- 1984–1985 TreGima Mobili
- 1985–1987 Acqua Recoaro
- 1987–1989 Pulitalia
- 1989–1998 Pal Zileri
- 1998–1999 Belfe
- 1999–2000 Caffè Vero
- 2000–2002 Artel
- 2002–2005 Caffè Vero
- 2005–2007 Acqua Recoaro
- 2007–2009 Fiera di Vicenza
- 2009–2010 Fiamm
- 2010–2017 Banca Popolare di Vicenza
- 2017–2018 Acciaierie Valbruna
- 2018– Diesel

== Fans and Ultras ==
Vicenza has numerous fans both in Italy and abroad.

The ultras movement was born in Vicenza in 1974 when, in October of that year, the Ultras group was founded. On 9 November of the following year, the second group of organised Berici supporters was founded: I Marines. The two groups resided in the Curva Sud and both had a skull as their symbol. In addition to these two groups, other groups of organised supporters were the Vigilantes, the main and historical group of the Curva Sud, born in 1978 and disbanded on 1 September 2012, after 34 years of presence: the symbol of the Vigilantes was a hooded head, called the boia, with two crossed axes in the background.

Besides the Vigilantes, the other three historical groups of the Curva Sud were the Fabio Group, the Caneva Berica and the Kapovolti. The Fabio Group, whose symbol was the tao, was founded in 1990 in memory of the death of Vigilantes fan Fabio Cucco. Caneva Berica, founded in 1990, had as its symbol a demijohn of wine while Kapovolti, founded in 1993, had as its logo a face of a drunken man with his tongue out, very similar to Frankenstein's monster. Until the 1997–1998 season the Fabio Group and Kapovolti fans resided in the Curva Sud; then from the 1998–1999 season they both settled in the Curva Nord, then in 2004 came the dissolution of these two groups.

In the second half of the 1980s, there was the birth of the Vecchia Guardia, or Old Guard. This was a group created by the same founders of the Vigilantes, whose banner was placed in the centre of the Curva Sud by the Vigilantes themselves, and was used in delicate moments for the fate of Vicenza, such as in the two most painful biancorosse seasons, 1988–1989 and 1989–1990, when Vicenza risked relegation to Serie C2 both times.

Today the main Curva Sud groups are: South Terrace, Lanerossi Crew 1902, Lanerossi Youth, Banda Thiene, Caneva Berica, and Vecchia Guardia.

=== Rivalries and friendships ===
The Vicenza ultras have a strong twinning with the Pescara fans: this is the first twinning in history between two ultras fans and dates back to 9 January 1977. Vicenza fans are also twinned with Reggiana (since 1982), Cremonese (since 1984), Udinese (since the 80s) and FC Metz (since 1997).

Vicenza also has friendships with Olympique Lyon and Vigor Lamezia.

The rivalry with Hellas Verona is one of the most notable in the club's history. Matches between the two teams is known as the Derby del Veneto, as the two clubs are the oldest and most successful teams in the Veneto region. This rivalry is often linked to the historical relationship between the neighboring cities of Vicenza and Verona, including conflicts between them during the Middle Ages, and has continued into the modern era.

Another historic rivalry with serious clashes is the one with Napoli: this relationship, which has always been antagonistic between the two fan groups, was accentuated even more in the mid-1990s, during home matches at the Menti, with incidents in and outside the Vicenza stadium occurring in March 1996, in January and May 1997; in addition to the violent episodes that occurred in the Coppa Italia final of the same year: during the first leg at the San Paolo there was throwing of fireworks, bombs and bathroom fittings, while at the return leg at the Menti there was the stabbing of a Vicenza supporter by the Neapolitan fans and the firing of flares from the Azzurri ultras which caused a burn to the face of an Udinese supporter.

In addition to the historical rivalries with Hellas Verona and Napoli, there are also other historical rivalries with: Padova, Brescia, Triestina (accentuated by their friendship with Verona and Lazio), SPAL, Cesena, Bologna, Atalanta and Venezia.

Relations with the supporters of the big three of Italian football are also bad: Juventus (the ties of hatred with the Juventus fans grew even stronger in 1996, when considerable incidents between the Vigilantes Vicenza and the Juventus ultras group Fighters), AC Milan, and Inter Milan (long-standing rivals, also accentuated by the friendship that united the Hellas Verona, Lazio and Nerazzurri fans).

Internationally, the only rivalry worth mentioning is the one with Chelsea, dating back to 1998 during the UEFA Cup Winners' Cup semi-final played between Chelsea and Vicenza (due to a large number of Verona supporters being present in the Vicenza stadium with Chelsea fans).

== Vicenza in popular culture ==
LR Vicenza, as one of the Italian clubs that have played the most Serie A championships, is featured in various works of Italian film, television as well as in music, and even in video games.

In films sphere, it is worth mentioning The Last Minute, a 1987 film directed by Pupi Avati and starring Ugo Tognazzi, Elena Sofia Ricci, Marco Leonardi and Diego Abatantuono; Vicenza, the Romeo Menti Stadium and the Curva Sud fans are also credited. In this film, both the inside and outside of the stadium were used as locations for filming. The red and white colours of the team featured in the film and some of its characteristics recall Vicenza, the emblem of the classic provincial team of national football in those years. The filming of the Vicenza Curva Sud was carried out on 26 April 1987 during the Vicenza-Cesena match. The stadium is also recognisable by the presence of the red and white banners of the ultras from Vicenza and the Pal Zileri billboard placed above the centre of the Curva Sud.

Also on the big screen, in the autumn of 2020, the filming of the film Mancino naturale, starring Claudia Gerini, Katia Ricciarelli and Massimo Ranieri, was shot at the Romeo Menti stadium: the main character, a fan of the Vicenza team, was named Paolo by his parents in honour of Paolo Rossi.

Tito Buy, founder in 1902 and first president of Vicenza, is the great-grandfather of actress Margherita Buy, while among the best-known fans of the Berici team is adult entretainer Rocco Siffredi.

In the musical sphere, the Vicenza punk rock band Derozer wrote the song Fedeli alla tribù in honour of Vicenza's away match at Stamford Bridge in London against Chelsea in the semi-final return leg of the 1997–1998 UEFA Cup Winners' Cup.

Vicenza is also the subject of a 2018 song by singer Francesca Michielin, "La Serie B", inspired by the relegation of the biancorossa team to Serie B in 2001.

Among other media, the Calciatori Panini album from the 1995–1996 season Vicenza's Gustavo Méndez as the cover photo as he races at speed with George Weah in the Vicenza-Milan match on 22 October 1995; while the PC Calcio 5.0 video game from the 1996–1997 season had as its global cover a photo of the biancorosso captain Giovanni Lopez grappling with Christian Vieri, taken during the Juventus–Vicenza match on 1 March 1997.
