= History of Bologna FC 1909 =

History of Italian association football club Bologna Football Club 1909

This is the history of Bologna Football Club 1909, an Italian football club based in the city of Bologna.

== The beginnings ==
=== The foundation ===
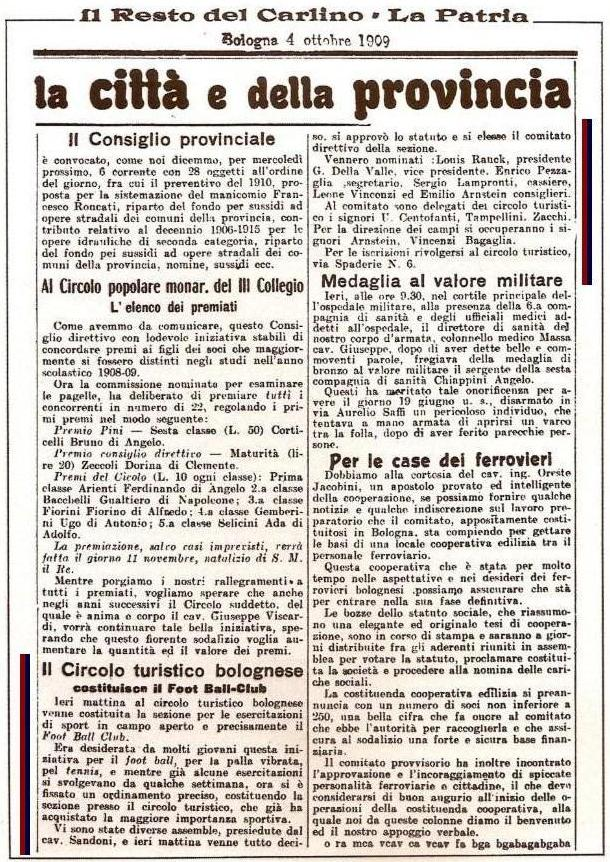
Page from Il Resto del Carlino dated October 4, 1909.

The founder of Bologna was Emilio Arnstein, a Bohemian native of Wotitz - later Votice - a small town in the Benešov district near Prague. Having become interested in football during his university studies in Prague and Vienna, in Habsburg Trieste, he had already founded with his brother Hugo, other Bohemians and a few Englishmen the Black Star Football Club. Arnstein arrived in Bologna in 1908 and immediately inquired where football was played in the city. After some inaccurate information, a tram driver finally appeared. He told him that he could find people playing football in Piazza d'Armi, in the so-called Prati di Caprara.

Among the boys who played at Prati di Caprara were the Gradi brothers, Louis Rauch, a young Swiss dentist who had settled in Bologna, and students from the College of Spain, including Antonio Bernabéu, brother of Santiago, legendary player and president of Real Madrid. Arrigo Gradi came to training wearing the red and blue shirt of the team from the Swiss school Wiget auf Schönberg in Rorschach, (Note: Almost all sources, including official ones such as the Bologna website, report that the college was only called Schönberg and was located in Rossbach, a location that is not in Switzerland. However, Swiss sources and subsequent research prove the incorrect information on the name and location of the college, although there is no certainty as to the exact transcription of the name. Cf. Koller, Brändle (2015, p. 25)., Cf. Chiesa (2019, p. 12).) in which he had studied, and these colours soon became the club's uniform. They, under the name “Felsineo,” had already played a match against their rivals from Ferrara, on November 4, 1906, which ended 3-3; this would be the first real football match ever played in Bologna. Years passed before the decision was made to form a club. Carlo Sandoni, president of the Circolo Turistico Bolognese, became interested in the matter. After a few meetings, on October 3, 1909, a Sunday morning, the pioneers were called to a meeting. Sandoni declared himself willing to sponsor their initiative, a charter was drafted, and thus the Bologna Football Club, a section of the Circolo Turistico, was born.

Louis Rauch was elected President, Guido Della Valle Vice-President, Enrico Penaglia Secretary, Sergio Lampronti Treasurer and Emilio Arnstein and Leone Vicenzi Councillors. The role of team captain was given to Arrigo Gradi, as he was the only player who held a little more experience than his other teammates, by virtue of having already played in Switzerland. The headquarters was the same as the Circolo Turistico Bolognese, that is, the old Ronzani Brewery, at number 6 Via Spaderie; the Caprara Fields were the venue. The club colours were officially red and blue, in quarters, following the pattern of the shirts Gradi had brought with him from Switzerland. The shorts were white.

=== The first matches and championships ===
On March 20, 1910, the Emilian Championship was organized, qualifying as a Terza Categoria for the teams of the time. Only two other teams, also from the city of Bologna, joined it: the Sempre Avanti! and Virtus. They competed for the title in two matches, played one after the other: Bologna first outclassed the Sempre Avanti! 10-0, then, after a rest of about ten minutes, inflicted a 9-1 victory on Virtus.

With the intention of registering for the Prima Categoria championship, Bologna had to revolutionize its corporate structure: it appointed Domenico Gori as president, moved its headquarters to the Bar Libertas on Via Ugo Bassi in Bologna, and finally identified a piece of land that could suit Bologna, which would be named “Cesoia,” after the tavern that owned the field. The uniforms also changed: from the red-and-blue quartered shirt, they switched to red-and-blue seven-ribbed jerseys with a neckline and fastening string. After a friendly match against the reigning Italian champions, Internazionale, in which the rossoblù were beaten but showed great skill, the club received permission to enter the Prima Categoria, the first division.

In that season and the next two Bologna did not shine, finishing in the last places of the Veneto-Emilia group. At the end of this last championship, in 1913, Bologna had to leave the Cesoia field and move to the Sterlino stadium: a ground that was finally worthy of a club on the rise. The stadium was not the best in terms of levelness: there was a difference of one metre in height from one goal to the other, and one half was played uphill and the other downhill. It was inaugurated at the first home match against Brescia.

The championships continued until May 21, 1915, when the Federation suspended the tournament due to the impending outbreak of World War I.

=== Bologna during and after the First World War ===
To make up for the hiatus, the FIGC in 1916 decided to organize a substitute tournament, the Coppa Federale. Bologna, included in the Emilian group with Modena and Audax Modena, finished second behind the canarini, thus losing the chance to participate in the final phase. Due to the worsening of the conflict, the tournament was never repeated. Then, the Emilian Regional Committee organized both in 1916 and 1917 the Emilia Cup, the first edition of which Bologna won, placing first with 14 points ahead of Reggio Emilia, while it lost the second one in the play-off against Modena. In addition to these events, numerous friendly matches were organized.

By the time it resumed its activities, the club was in a disastrous state: the ground had fallen into disrepair, the stand had collapsed, the fence had disappeared, the members were scattered and the club's coffers were empty. Seven first-team players were also absent. Others were injured. Their sacrifice was commemorated on 19 September 1920 with a permanent plaque placed under the new Sterlino stand.

== 1920s ==
=== Felsner's arrival ===
==== The rise to the top ====
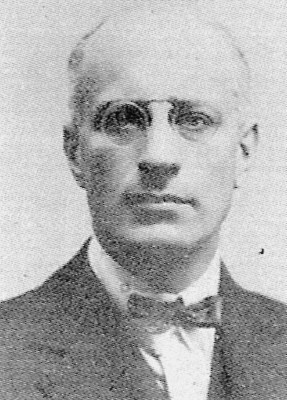
Hermann Felsner, Bologna's first coach

Bologna's championship restarted on October 12, 1919, with a victory against GS Bolognese. The 1919-1920 Prima Categoria championship was the one that for the first time saw the debut of a player purchased from another team: Bernardo Perin, bought from Modena for 2 lire.

The team was now competitive in its group, but it lacked a figure that had emerged over the years: the coach. The rossoblù board then decided to provide for the hiring of a professional coach. Bologna's president, Cesare Medica, placed an advertisement in a popular Viennese newspaper. Several people responded and then Arrigo Gradi was sent on a mission to Vienna. The choice of Bologna's historic founder fell on Hermann Felsner. In Felsner's first year, the 1920-1921 season, Bologna a won the Emilian title by beating rivals Modena in 3 games in the finals, and thus went through the national semifinals all the way to the Lega Nord final against Pro Vercelli. Bologna suffered their first league defeat at the hands of the Piedmontese, although it was not without controversy as Rampini scored the decisive goal in an alleged offside position.

In the next two seasons Bologna consistently placed third in its group.

==== The first Lega Nord final ====
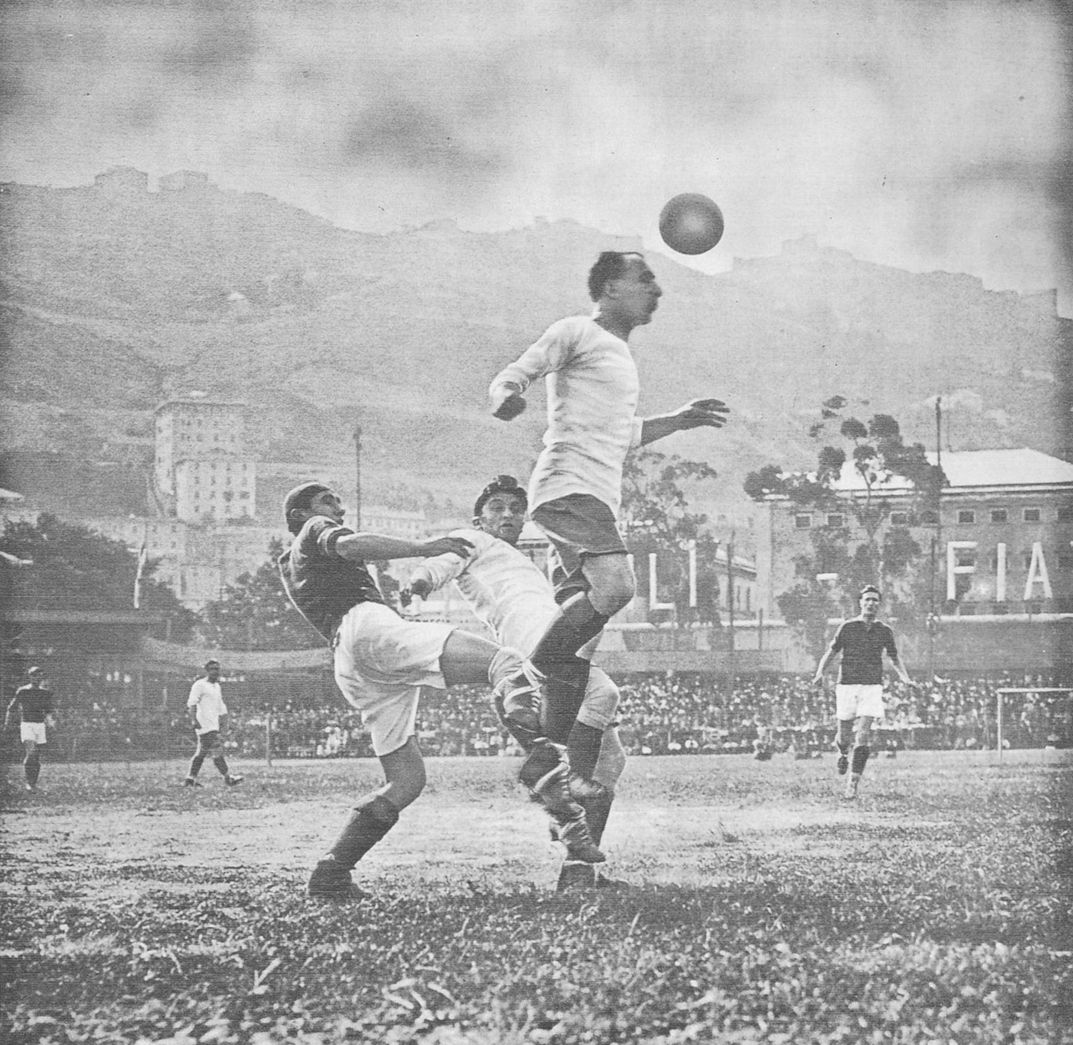
Angelo Schiavio (in dark shirt) during the first leg of the final against Genoa in the 1923-1924 season.

In the 1923-1924 season the Veltri made it to the Lega Nord final by losing to Genoa, in two fiery matches that kicked off a fierce rivalry. The two rossoblù teams faced each other for the Lega Nord final on June 15, 1924, at Genoa's Via del Piano field in Marassi. The match was settled in favor of the hosts only in the final, thanks to a goal by Neri, despite a clear supremacy on the part of the Felsinei. Bologna later lodged an appeal against the homologation of the result - for a punch delivered by Giovanni Battista Traverso to Giuseppe Della Valle - but this was rejected. Genoa was fined 1,000 liras for the pitch invasion, while Traverso was disqualified.

The return match took place in Bologna a week later, on the Sterlino field. Bologna maintained a clear dominance of the match, but the Grifoni responded promptly in the first half with a goal by Santamaria. The match resumed and the young Emilian formation managed to equalize with a penalty converted by Alberto Pozzi. Tempers flared and Milanese referee Panzeri got completely out of hand. The match was abandoned with just minutes to go, with the referee explaining that he had taken the decision because of the intemperance of the home fans. The referee also wrote in his match report that he had given the penalty to Bologna "on the pretext of avoiding incidents on the pitch and in the stands". The FIGC's decision was then in favour of the Ligurian side.

One of the more memorable victories of the season came against Pro Vercelli, who had been unbeaten for ten years, with a 2-1 win at the Eusebian stadium.

=== The first scudetto ===
In the 1924-1925 season, Bologna, placed in Group B of Lega Nord, finished the championship in first place, surpassing Juventus and Pro Vercelli in the standings by only two points. Again Bologna found itself in the final of Lega Nord ahead of Genoa, triumphant in Group A. It took five matches to determine the winner. The first one was played in Bologna on May 24, 1924: Bologna, in a white jersey with a horizontal red-blue band, was defeated 2-1 by Genoa, with goals by former Felsinei striker Cesare Alberti and Edoardo Catto; shortening the gap for Bologna was a young Bologna striker, Angelo Schiavio. The return match was played in Genoa on May 31 and the game ended 2-1 again, but this time in Bologna's favor (Giuseppe Muzzioli and Giuseppe Della Valle scored for the Felsinei, Aristodemo Santamaria scored the Ligurian equalizer) in a very heated confrontation with several stoppages due to clashes on the pitch and in the stands.

A play-off was therefore necessary, set for the following Sunday, June 7, in Milan. Genoa took a double lead with Daniele Moruzzi and again Alberti. When a shot from Bologna's Muzzioli found its way into Genoa's goal in the sixteenth minute of the second half, referee Mauro pointed to the goal for a corner, believing that the Genoa goalkeeper had deflected the ball out of play and into the net, but a large crowd of Bologna supporters took to the pitch and surrounded the referee. After about a quarter of an hour of suspension, the referee decided to validate the goal to appease the Bologna supporters; finally, Bologna secured the equalizer thanks to Alberto Pozzi. Normal time ended in a draw, but Genoa refused to play extra time and asked for a replay after Muzzioli's phantom goal was conceded; Bologna responded by claiming automatic victory on the basis that the Ligurians had not gone to extra time. Although the regulations did not provide for the retrospective annulment of the entire match as a result of the referee's challenge, thus obliging the body de facto to side with one of the two teams, the league did not recognise the 2-2 draw and rejected both the Ligurian and Emilian appeals, ordering the play-off to be replayed.

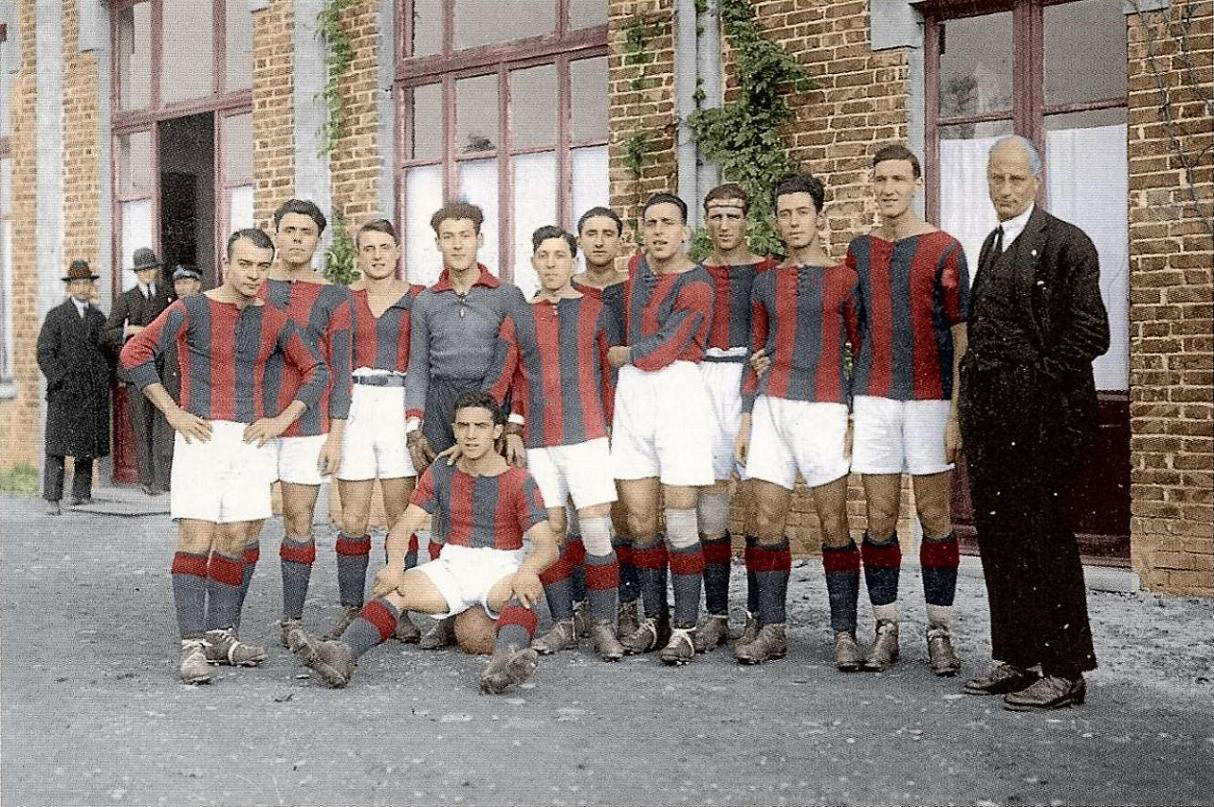
1924-1925 Italian champion Bologna

There were no pitch invasions during the final quarter of the game, which ended 1-1. After the game, however, there were clashes at the Porta Nuova station, with two Genoans injured by gunfire. After insults and bickering between the leaders of Bologna and Genoa, and the threat of disqualification for the Felsinei by the Federal Council (which provoked a street protest in Bologna), peace was restored on 26 July with the mediation of the Lega Nord, and another play-off was scheduled.

On August 9, 1925, at 8 a.m., the fifth and final Lega Nord final was played on the Milan field of Forza e Coraggio in Vigentino. Only managers, journalists and a few local fans attended, and the field was surrounded by a squadron of mounted carabinieri. Bologna, who played in green with black collars, won easily and with merit by 2-0, despite ending the match with 9 men, due to the expulsions of Alberto Giordani and Giovanni Borgato. The Petronians took the lead through Pozzi, before Perin made it 2-0 at the end. The Lega Nord title was won by Bologna, which qualified for the national final against the winner of the Lega Sud.

However, the championship was not yet over and Bologna were not yet champions: they still had to face Lega Sud winners Alba Roma in the two-legged final of the national championship; both matches were won by Bologna, the first 4-0 and the second 2-0. The rossoblù were crowned Italian champions for the first time.

=== The second scudetto and the missed titles ===
==== The 1926 Northern final and the new stadium ====
The following season, Bologna proved more than worthy of the title, going undefeated in 21 of their 22 matches and boasting the league's most prolific attack, scoring an impressive 74 goals and conceding just 20. Only on the last day of the season were they defeated in Turin by the granata. In the Northern League final, they surrendered the Scudetto in three games to Juventus by one goal, after two draws at the Sterlino and Corso Marsiglia.

To accommodate the now thousands of rossoblù supporters, the new Stadio Littoriale was inaugurated on October 31, 1926, due to the initiative and impetus of Leandro Arpinati, podestà of Bologna as well as FIGC president and fervent supporter of the rossoblù colors. The large stadium, complete with swimming pools and tennis courts, represented at the same time a reward for the team's triumphs, and became a symbol of the city of Bologna.

==== The Allemandi Case ====
In the 1926-1927 season, the challenge for the Scudetto centered between Bologna and Torino. Both teams qualified for the final, with the granata finishing first and the rossoblù second, but the Scudetto was marred by one of Italy's first corruption scandals, known as the Allemandi case. Torino were stripped of the title after a controversial sports tribunal, but Arpinati did not award it to Bologna, contrary to the rules in force at the time, leaving it unallocated on the grounds that the affair had distorted the results of the championship as a whole. The reasons behind Arpinati's action were never fully clarified: according to his admirers he did not award the title to the Felsinei to avoid suspicions of bias, while for his detractors the party official's handling of both the scandal and the entire tournament would have been geared to favor Bologna and the decision not to award the scudetto would have been imposed on him by the fascist regime.

Meanwhile, in the summer there was an important change in the corporate structure: again Arpinati decided to create the “Bologna Sportiva,” a multi-sport club with sections dedicated to various sports including fencing, athletics, tennis, as well as soccer.

==== The 1929 Scudetto ====
The second scudetto came in the 1928-1929 season, the last tournament played before the advent of the single round. In this championship Bologna's roster was far superior to its opponents: 24 positive results, with 20 wins and 4 draws; 86 goals scored of which 29 were by Schiavio alone. The final saw Bologna again against Torino: the first leg, played at the Stadio Littoriale, was won by the rossoblù 3-1; the return, played at the Stadio Filadelfia, was won by the granata 1-0. On July 7, at the Stadio Nazionale in Rome, the Felsinei won the third and decisive play-off match 1-0, with a goal by Giuseppe Muzzioli, and became Italian champions for the second time in their history. Thus Bologna qualified for the Central European Cup, but they chose not to go and instead toured South America. The effects of that campaign, which ended in late September after 14 games in less than two months, were felt the following season as the Petronians finished sixth.

== 1930s ==
=== The two Central European Cups and the advent of Dall'Ara ===
The first major event was the 1930-1931 season, which saw the resignation of coach Felsner after 11 years. In his place came - by the early 1930s - only the second coach in the club's history: Gyula Lelovics. Despite finishing third in their first season under the new coach, the following season was a success, with Bologna reaching the final of the Central European Cup. The match, however, was not played, as incidents between Juventus and Slavia Prague in the other semifinal led the cup's technical committee to decide for the exclusion of both teams from the competition and consequently proclaimed Bologna the winner of the 1932 edition. Thus, for the first time in Italian football history, a team won an international European Cup.

Their second European title came two seasons later: Bologna qualified for the 1934 edition of the Mitropa Cup by virtue of finishing third in the previous season, and it was a triumph. Following the Italian team's victory in the 1934 World Cup - in which Bologna player Angelo Schiavio scored in the final - Bologna's success in the Central European Cup sanctioned the definitive dominance

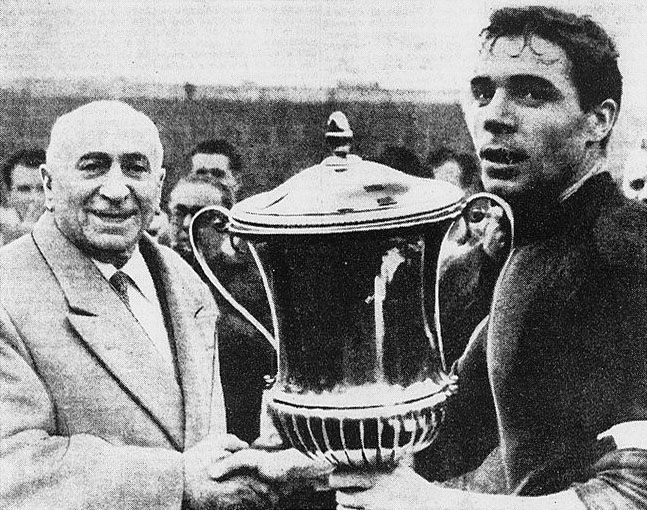
Renato Dall'Ara (left), the most victorious president in Bologna's history

of Italian football on the European stage. Bologna's affirmation came in the form of a thunderous goalscoring display that underlined the team's strength and talent: 3 goals against Bocskai, 6 against Rapid Wien and 5 against Ferencváros in the semi-finals. In the final, the Petronians faced the reigning Austrian champions Admira Wien, a team full of prominent members of the Wunderteam. The rossoblù lost 3-2 in the first leg of the final at the Prater in Vienna. The return leg at the Littoriale, played on a scorching hot day, saw Bologna dominate the Austrians: 5-1, with Carlo Reguzzoni leading the way with three goals. Reguzzoni also finished as the tournament's top scorer. Bologna were at the top of Europe for the second time in three years, the only Italian team to do so in the classic period of the Central European Cup, from 1927 to 1940. In the meantime, things had changed at the top of the club: with the fall from grace of Leandro Arpinati - and by extension of all the men associated with him, including president Bonaveri - a textile entrepreneur, then in his forties and originally from Reggio Emilia, appeared on the Bologna scene; his name was Renato Dall'Ara, who became extraordinary commissioner of Bologna and then president, thus beginning his thirty-year presidency, the most glorious in Bologna's history.

=== The “squadron that makes the world tremble” ===
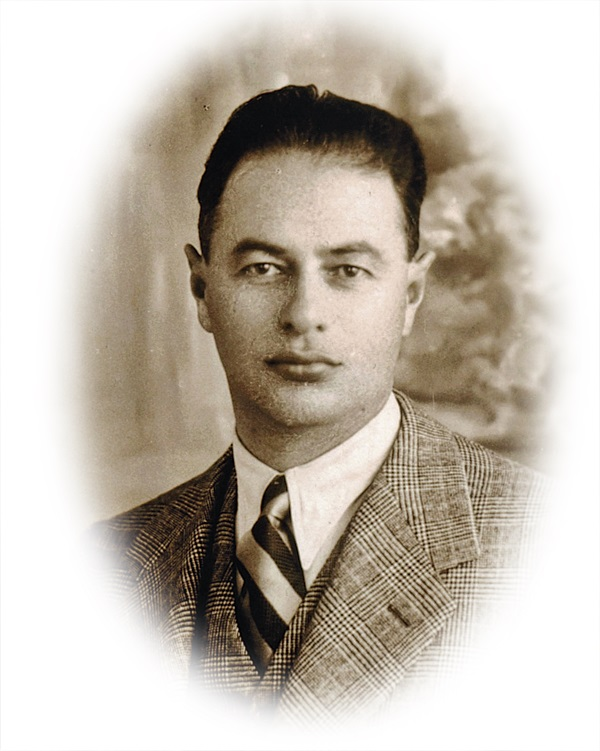
Hungarian coach Árpád Weisz won two championships with the team. Bologna's curva sud is named after him.

From 1934 to 1945, there was a clear red-and-blue dominance in Italy and Europe: in six years, from 1935 to 1941, the team won no less than four Scudetti. The new coach, Hungarian Árpád Weisz, was the driving force behind this dominance. The first fruits of this were seen in 1936, when they won their third Scudetto. This was despite having a very small squad of just 14 players. The following year, with another Scudetto and victory in the prestigious Paris Exposition tournament, which brought together all the teams that had won their respective championships the previous season, the Veltri established themselves as one of the best teams on the continent. Despite finishing fifth in the following season, Bologna won another Scudetto in the 1938-1939 season. The winner was not Weisz, who had been forced to leave Italy following the enactment of racial laws, but Hermann Felsner, the Felsinei's former coach in the early years of the club's existence. The following year, the Petronians and Ambrosiana, Giuseppe Meazza's team, competed for the Scudetto; after a hard-fought championship, the two teams met in the final match of the season, with both sides at the top of the table and the Milanese a point clear of Bologna. The match was won by Ambrosiana, who were crowned Italian champions.

== 1940s ==
=== The sixth scudetto ===
The 1940-1941 season ended with Bologna winning their sixth Scudetto, despite the fact that the war had begun four months earlier; an aura of invincibility surrounded Bologna, so much so that the fans dusted off an old pioneer hymn: "It is Bologna the squadron that makes the world tremble". Winning the Scudetto was to be Bologna's last joy for many years: the following year they finished seventh and then, due to the war, the championship was suspended. When Felsner returned home after the championship, there was a sense of a cycle coming to an end.

=== The wartime championships and the Alta Italia Cup ===
Felsner left and Dall'Ara appointed Mario Montesanto, who led the team to a sixth-place finish. However, Serie A was forced to suspend its activities when the Second World War broke out in Italy. The passion for football was unrelenting, so a wartime championship was organised in which only teams from northern and central Italy took part. Bologna made it to the semifinals, losing to Spezia, who would later win the competition. At the end of the war, a hundred or so supporters held a general meeting at the Modernissimo cinema in the city centre: the club was reinstated under the old name of Bologna Football Club, and the election of the president was a plebiscite for the man who had won four Scudetti in six seasons: Renato Dall'Ara. The rossoblù, despite losing important players such as Puricelli and Andreolo, won the Coppa Alta Italia. In the meantime, two great players had risen to national prominence, two champions who would thrill the crowds at the Stadio Renato Dall'Ara for years to come: Gino Cappello, a skilful and fleet-footed forward who had been acquired by Bologna in the swap that brought Puricelli to Milan, and Cesarino Cervellati, a dribbling right winger who had grown up in Bologna's youth academy and would wear the blue shirt of the national team on several occasions. In the league, however, the team finished sixth again.

== 1950s ==
=== The years of mediocrity ===
From the championships of the 1950s onwards, Bologna went through a very dark period, unable to compete in Italy and Europe, to the extent that the Felsinei were threatened with relegation in the 1949-1950 and 1951-1952 seasons. This was especially due to the demise of the Metodo, the playing style that from the 1920s until the early 1940s had guaranteed six Scudetti for Bologna, but which by then had been supplanted by the Sistema; president Dall'Ara's reluctance to abandon the old tactical style of play led to the appointment of coaches who were still tied to it, resulting in unsuccessful championships in terms of both tactics and results. Eventually with the arrival of Edmund Crawford in 1949, Bologna also officially switched to the Sistema, but without achieving good results.

=== The slow revival ===
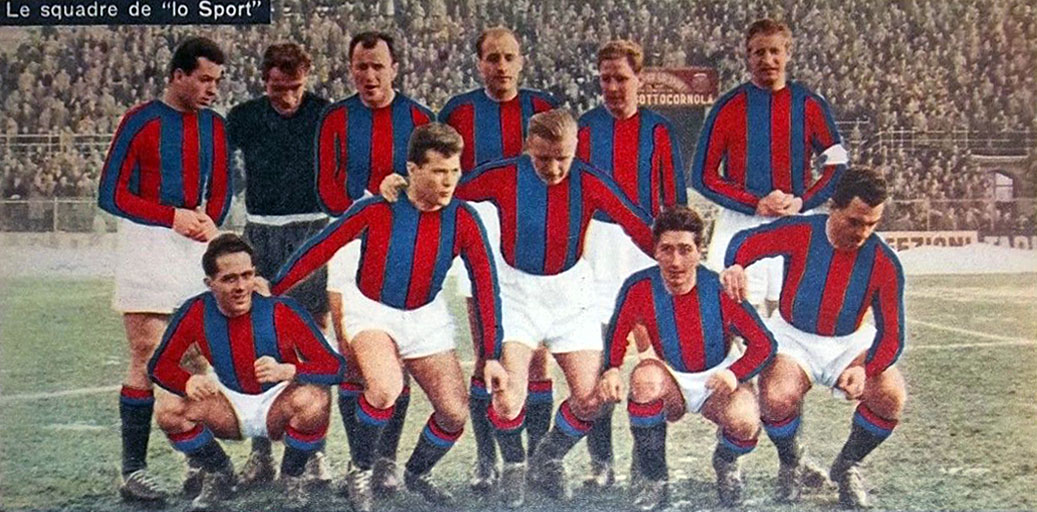
A Bologna lineup in the 1953-1954 season

After finishing sixteenth in the league, the worst position in Bologna's history at the time, Dall'Ara changed coaches again, opting for Giuseppe Viani.

In 1953, Bologna acquired two players from Verona: Gino Pivatelli, a center forward, and Ugo Pozzan, a young midfielder with superb technique. "Il Piva" - as he was nicknamed - turned out to be a real ace: great technique, a powerful shot and an eye for goal of the highest order. With him in the team and the unstoppable Cappello, Bologna returned to positions more in line with their rank: fourth in 1954-1955, and fifth in 1955-1956. Pivatelli was the league's top scorer with 29 goals in 30 games, the only Italian footballer to achieve this feat in the 1950s.

It was a year that saw the arrival of a very young striker from Friuli who would go on to write indelible pages in the club's history: Ezio Pascutti, who scored an away goal on his debut against L.R. Vicenza.

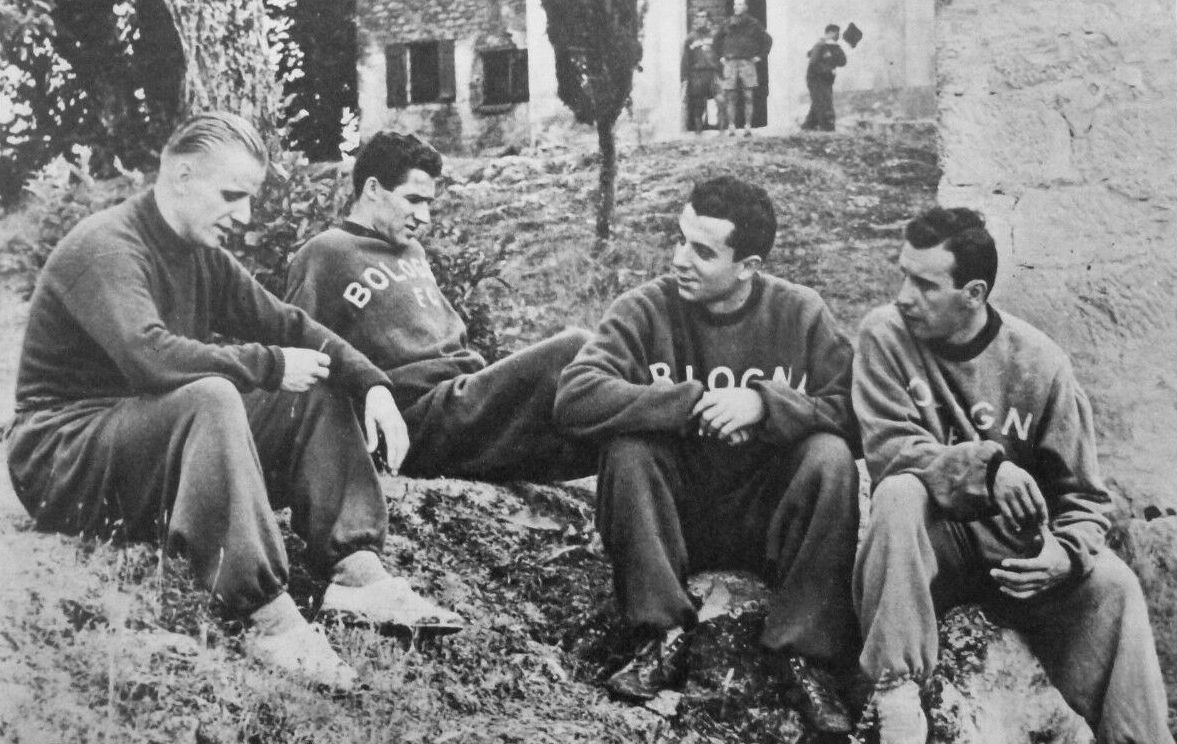
From left to right: Axel Pilmark, Dante Bendin, Gino Pivatelli - former top scorer in the 1955-1956 championship in a red-and-blue jersey - and Humberto Maschio relaxing at Zocca during the 1958 summer pre-season.

The following year, Bologna plunged back into chaos: the team did not take off, Viani resigned and in his place came Aldo Campatelli, a former Bologna player. In the end, they finished in fifth place, much higher than expected given the turbulence of the previous events. The following seasons would be marked by ups and downs, but the players who would later make up the starting line-up that won the Scudetto in 1963-1964 were already in place; Mirko Pavinato arrived in Bologna in 1956-1957, and Paride Tumburus followed the next year; that season, a very young Giacomo Bulgarelli from Portonovo di Medicina, who would go on to become one of the club's idols for many years to come, arrived at Bologna. The following season, 1958-1959, more players were bought to complete the team that would win the Scudetto: Romano Fogli, Marino Perani and Carlo Furlanis.

== 1960s ==
=== The advent of Bernardini ===
At the start of the 1960-1961 season, Roman coach Fulvio Bernardini arrived in Bologna with the intention of repeating the feat he had achieved with Fiorentina in 1955-1956. Upon his arrival, the new coach asked for and signed two players who would prove to be fundamental: Franco Janich and Bruno Franzini, midfielder and defender respectively, arrived from Lazio. For the attack, Harald Nielsen arrived from Denmark, on the advice of former rossoblù player Axel Pilmark. The first season got off to a slow start, so much so that president Renato Dall'Ara had already begun to contact several coaches to replace Bernardini, including the former Viani, to whom the president had remained attached. Despite the criticism, the team finished fourth, their best finish in 20 years. They also won the Mitropa Cup, not as prestigious as before the war, but still important. These were also the years of the World Cup in Chile; the Felsinei who took part in the expedition were Paride Tumburus, Giacomo Bulgarelli, Franco Janich and Ezio Pascutti, but the Azzurri's adventure would prove to be unsuccessful. The following season saw the addition of Helmut Haller, who brought a breath of fresh air and inventiveness to a team that was already playing at the top of its game. Bologna continued the trend of last season, with the Petronian coach exclaiming at the end of a 7-1 win over Modena: "People only play like this in heaven!" In the same tournament, Ezio Pascutti set a record by scoring 12 goals in the first 10 days. In the end they finished fourth, but throughout the season the goalkeeping problem was a central issue: some uncertainties cost Attilio Santarelli his job, who was replaced by Paolo Cimpiel and then Rino Rado. The following season, however, the problem was solved with the signing of Italy international William Negri.

=== The seventh scudetto ===
==== The doping case ====
On 4 March 1964, following doping tests carried out two days earlier after a 4-1 win over Torino, five Bologna players - Mirko Pavinato, Romano Fogli, Paride Tumburus, Marino Perani and Ezio Pascutti - tested positive. The test tubes containing the "incriminating material" were confiscated by the judicial authorities, and the FIGC formalised the measure: 3 penalty points for Bologna, 18 months' disqualification for coach Fulvio Bernardini and the club's doctor Igino Poggiali, and the acquittal of the accused players for unknowingly taking doping substances. The reaction of the city was that of those who knew they have been wronged by the powerful, with many complaining that the decision was made to halt Bologna's progress in favour of more prestigious teams such as Inter or Milan, who were more highly regarded by the Lega Calcio.

Immediately after the FIGC's decision, Bologna asked for a counter-analysis to be carried out on the second urine sample. The regulations required the sample to be split into two bottles at the time of collection to allow for possible verification. However, the counter-analyses proved the innocence of the players: the amphetamines found in the test tubes were in excessive quantities for a human being and could not have been administered to the accused players. Having established that there was no evidence that the players had taken banned substances, the Federal Court of Appeal acquitted Bologna, team doctor Poggiali and Bernardini on 16 May and cancelled the three penalty points. Although those responsible for the tampering with the test tubes were never officially identified, some testimonies in the following decades cast suspicion on the figure of Gipo Viani, Milan's technical director at the time.

==== The playoff-scudetto ====
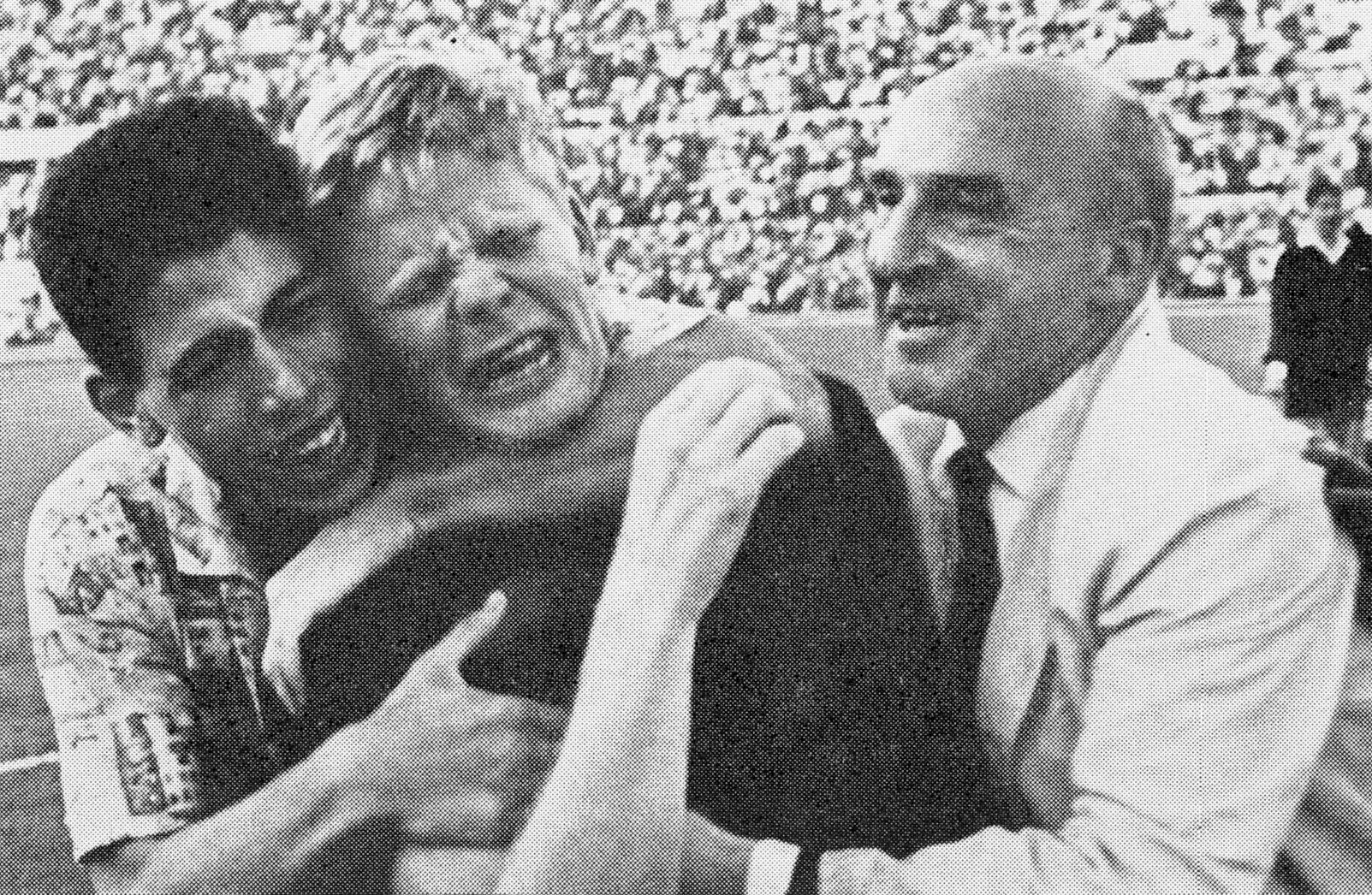
From left to right: a fan, Helmut Haller and coach Fulvio Bernardini celebrate at the end of the victorious play-off match.

The championship thus ended with the two teams paired in first place, Bologna and Inter: for the first time in the history of Serie A, a play-off was necessary, which was played in Rome on June 7, 1964. However, three days before the match, terrible news struck the rossoblù players: the president Renato Dall'Ara had died suddenly of a heart attack while he was in the League headquarters with Angelo Moratti, Inter's owner, to finalize the organizational details for the play-off. With their hearts in mourning, Bologna played a perfect game, winning 2-0 thanks to an own goal from Facchetti and a goal from Harald Nielsen to claim their seventh Scudetto after 23 years. The title marked the end of Dall'Ara's reign as Bologna's most successful president: four Scudettos - including the one won in 1964, shortly after his death - the Paris Exposition tournament, a Mitropa Cup and a Coppa Alta Italia.

=== The first Coppa Italia ===
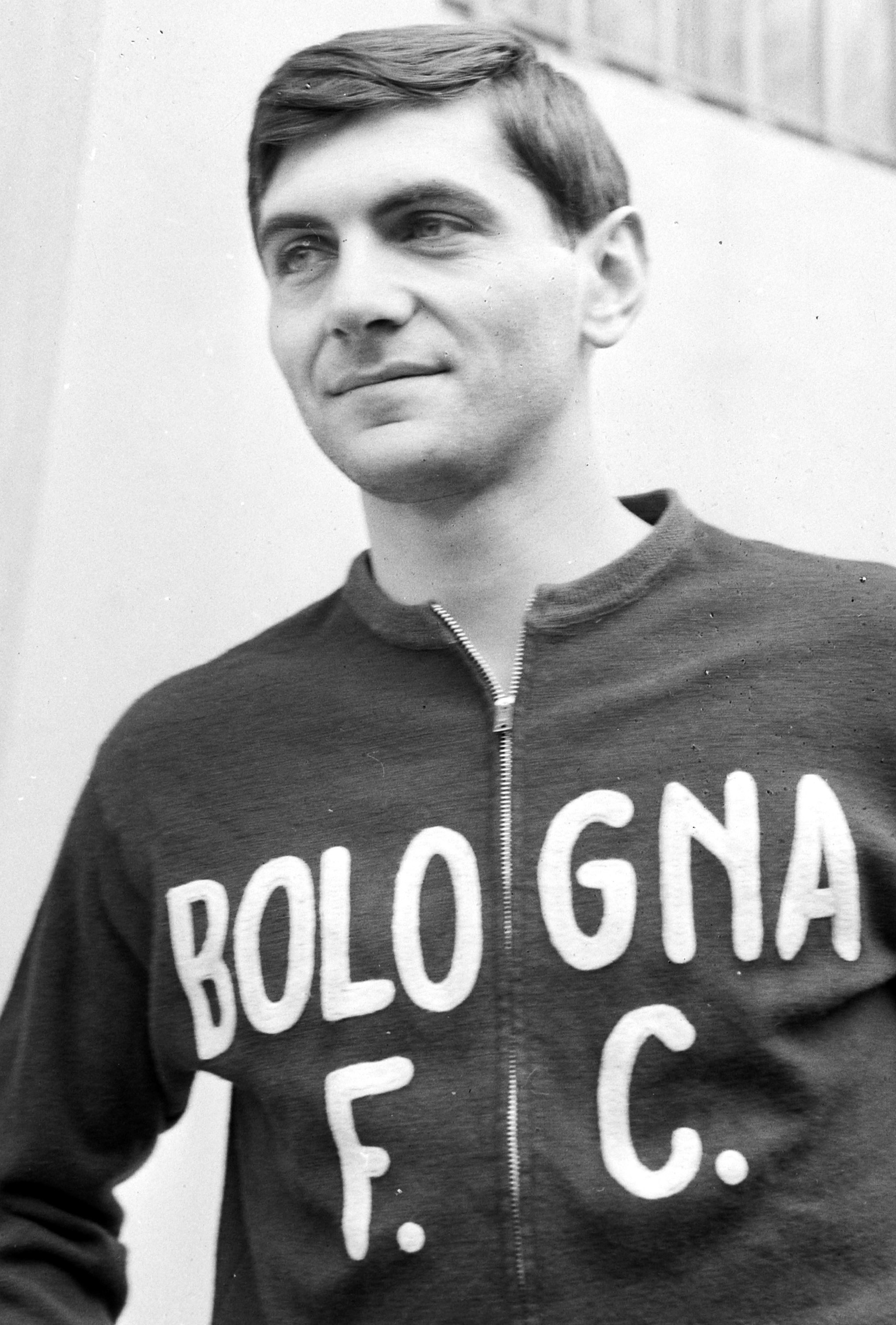
Giacomo Bulgarelli, the most capped player in the club's history

Dall'Ara was replaced by vice-president Luigi Goldoni, who had already been on the club's board for years. The season following the victory of the seventh Scudetto saw the team participate for the first time in the European Cup, in which, however, it was eliminated in the preliminary round against Anderlecht, which was decided in favor of the Belgians in the Camp Nou play-off - after two matches that had yielded a draw - by the toss of the coin. Bologna finished sixth in the league, disappointing many of their fans.

After that season, the club decided to shake up the team: Goldoni released Fulvio Bernardini, and in his place came first Manlio Scopigno and then Luis Carniglia. The Argentine coach led Bologna to two excellent finishes: a runners-up spot in the Fairs Cup - where they reached the quarter-finals and lost to Leeds Utd on a coin flip - and a third-place finish. Meanwhile, in 1966 Goldoni had brought back Gipo Viani, a former coach of the team in the 1950s, as general manager. On his arrival, however, disagreements arose between him and Carniglia, and after a heated argument the club decided to sack the Argentine coach and replace him with Cesarino Cervellati, a Bologna icon of the 1950s and 1960s.

Over time, however, several of Bologna's championship-winning protagonists were sold: first Harald Nielsen, then Helmut Haller, while Ezio Pascutti retired and William Negri spent a year out injured before being traded. The sale of Haller was Goldoni's last act as president, as he was succeeded by Raimondo Venturi, an entrepreneur in the pipe industry and the third post-war president. In 1969 Venturi appointed Oronzo Pugliese as technical director. In the 1969-1970 season, Edmondo Fabbri was hired as the new coach. In his first year on the job, the former Italy technical commissioner won the Coppa Italia: Giuseppe Savoldi scored a brace in the decisive match to beat Torino 2-0.

== 1970s and 1980s ==
=== The second Coppa Italia ===
In the seasons that followed, the team continued to miss out on the top spots. Their only consolation was winning the Anglo-Italian League Cup in 1970 and the second Coppa Italia in 1973-1974, beating Palermo on penalties in the final in Rome. The coach of this victory was Bruno Pesaola, who took over from Fabbri in 1972 at the express request of the new president Luciano Conti, an industrialist with interests ranging from electricity to publishing (Guerin Sportivo and Autosprint) and mechanics, who became the fifth post-war president for 400 million lire.

In 1975, Giacomo Bulgarelli, an icon of the team, retired at the age of 35. While the captain's armband passed to Mauro Bellugi, Bulgarelli's technical legacy was taken up by Eraldo Pecci, another midfielder who had come through the youth academy. The fans only got to see him for a few seasons, however, as he was sold to Torino along with centre-forward Giuseppe Savoldi, who was also sold to Napoli for a record two billion in the summer of 1975. The fans had no patience with president Conti's policy of selling off the best players, and were very vocal in their disapproval.

After a series of seasons between 5th and 8th place, the rescues in extremis began, of which Cesarino Cervellati was the architect, often called upon to lift Bologna's fortunes when everything seemed to be in jeopardy, as in the 1978-1979 season, when they were saved on the last day, in the final outing of another symbolic figure after Bulgarelli: full-back Tazio Roversi.

=== Match-fixing scandal and the first relegations ===
In 1979-1980, Tommaso Fabbretti took over from Conti, and the season began with former player Marino Perani as coach and the return of Savoldi, but this championship was tainted by the rossoblù's involvement in the match-fixing scandal. Bologna received the heavy penalty of 5 points, Savoldi and Petrini were disqualified for 3 years and 6 months, and Colomba only for 3 months. The team's performance during the championship was unaffected by the penalty, and in fact it enhanced the merits of coach Luigi Radice, who led the rossoblù to a 7th place finish after many important victories.

Despite a good league campaign, the club failed to keep Radice, who signed for AC Milan. Bologna then turned to Tarcisio Burgnich, a great protagonist of Herrera's Inter European Championship campaign but a coach with little experience in the top flight. The coach's inexperience was exacerbated by the imbalances of an environment still reeling from the match-fixing scandal, which was causing discontent among the players. All these factors led to the first relegation in the club's history, with a comeback defeat to Ascoli. The only notable event of the season was the Serie A debut of 16-year-old Roberto Mancini on 13 September 1981, who played in all 30 matches of the season and finished as the team's top scorer with nine goals.

Following the relegation, Fabbretti decided to recall Luigi Radice, a coach still very popular with the fans and recently sacked by AC Milan, but on 6 July Radice held a press conference to announce that he would not lead Bologna without Mancini, his strongest and most important player, who by then had been sold to Sampdoria for four billion. In the championship, the team coached first by Alfredo Magni, then by Paolo Carosi and finally by Cervellati confounded all expectations, not only failing to challenge for promotion to the Serie A, but also being relegated for the second time in the club's history in just twelve months.

=== The return to Europe ===
Towards the end of the season, Fabbretti sold his shares to Giuseppe Brizzi from Verona, who rebuilt the twice-relegated team for the C1 championship and managed to win promotion in the first year. Bologna were promoted to Serie B on 3 June 1984, the twentieth anniversary of the death of Renato Dall'Ara, after whom the former Littoriale and Comunale stadiums were named in a brief and evocative ceremony. The coach was Giancarlo Cadè, who was not reappointed for the following season. He was replaced by Santin, who was sacked after a bitter dispute with Domenico Marocchino, one of the most important signings of the 1984-85 season. That year Bologna managed to save itself with a barely respectable ninth place, and in the last decisive days Recchia and Brizzi handed over the presidency to Luigi Corioni, an industrialist from Brescia, who carefully prepared the revival of the rossoblù. After a few seasons in which Bologna failed to return to Serie A, the 1987-1988 championship saw the Felsinei return to the top flight thanks to Luigi Maifredi, who overcame general scepticism and brought a vibrant style of play to Serie A. After a quiet season in which Bologna finished mid-table, Maifredi even managed to qualify for the UEFA Cup in the 1989-1990 season, before leaving Bologna to take charge of Juventus.

== 1990s ==
=== Bankruptcy ===
With the departure of Maifredi and a number of key players such as Pecci, Marocchi, Luppi and De Marchi, Bologna began the season with many uncertainties and doubts. Coach Franco Scoglio was sacked after just six days, having collected just two points. In the crucial moments of the championship, the team was exhausted due to its involvement in the UEFA Cup, where the most important physical resources were used. As a result, the joy of their European exploits was tempered by the difficulties of the league campaign, which saw Bologna relegated to Serie B but surprisingly reach the quarter-finals, where they were eliminated by Sporting Lisbon. After the relegation, Corioni, tired of the protests that followed the relegation, decided to sell his shares to Pietro Gnudi and Valerio Gruppioni. The man behind the two was Pasquale Casillo, who was interested in Bologna for unspecified reasons.

In the following season in Serie B, the club only finished in thirteenth place with a rescue in extremis, while the following season, 1992-93, proved to be dramatic: after the departure of partners Vanderlingh and Gruppioni, Piero Gnudi and Casillo remained at the helm of Bologna. The club finished in eighteenth place, their second relegation to Serie C1 in eleven years. On 19 June 1993, the club faced bankruptcy, which had been threatened on several occasions during the season due to the club's inability to pay old debts and unpaid monthly instalments. The debts amounted to two billion lire, and the bank exposure was 34 billion lire.

=== Gazzoni's presidency ===
==== The return to Serie A ====
At the end of June, a court decision put the club up for sale. At the bankruptcy auction for the purchase of the in bonis fraction of the rossoblù, including rights and sporting titles, which had been spun off from the bankrupt Finsport, Giuseppe Gazzoni Frascara, at the head of a group of local businessmen, acquired ownership of the club for 8 billion lire and managed to secure entry to the next Serie C1 championship under the name of Bologna Football Club 1909, with an ambitious revival project. Gazzoni became president, with Alberto Zaccheroni as coach, and Eraldo Pecci as sporting director. Ambitions were dashed in the play-offs against SPAL amid recriminations.

At the second attempt, with Edy Reja as coach and then Renzo Ulivieri, along with Gabriele Oriali as sporting director, the club took the first step towards revival with a return to Serie B, finishing the year in first place with 81 points and only one defeat. Twelve months later, in June 1996, the rossoblù celebrated their second successive league title with an instant promotion to Serie A, thanks to Giorgio Bresciani's stoppage-time goal against Chievo. The 1996-1997 season saw Bologna back in the top flight. New signings included Marocchi, Fontolan and Andersson from Bari and Kolyvanov from Foggia. It was thanks to these two foreigners that the team took another leap forward, with a series of prestigious away wins over Inter and Lazio, a 7th place finish and the semi-final of the Coppa Italia, which they lost to L.R. Vicenza, who were destined to win the trophy.

==== The Intertoto Cup and the UEFA Cup semifinal against Marseille ====
The semifinal against Marseille

1998–99 UEFA Cup

Bologna, 20 April 1999, 20:30
Stadio Renato Dall'Ara

Bologna – Olympique de Marseille
1 – 1

- Referee: (Germany) Merk
- Scorers: 17' Paramatti (Bologna)
  87' (pen.) Blanc (Marseille)
- Expulsions: 89' Marocchi (Bologna)

The following season, Ulivieri's fourth in a row, ended in eighth place and with the right to play in the Intertoto Cup; but it was also the year of Roberto Baggio at Bologna, surprisingly signed by Gabriele Oriali and Gazzoni in a clever market operation. The Divin Codino was the protagonist of a memorable journey on a personal level towards the goal of being called up to the Azzurri squad for the World Cup, as he led the rossoblù to a turnaround with 22 goals, along with teammates Andersson and Kolyvanov, who within two years had already become Bologna's most beloved foreign players of all time.

Baggio's adventure lasted only one season, after which he would be sold to Inter. Oriali and Ulivieri would also leave the club to join Parma and Napoli respectively. To replace them, Gazzoni turned to Oreste Cinquini as sporting director, Carlo Mazzone as coach and Giuseppe Signori as the team's star striker. The team won the Intertoto Cup by defeating Ruch Chorzów in the final, adding a title to their trophy cabinet that had been missing since the 1974 Coppa Italia. The team finished ninth in the league. They also won the play-off against Inter to qualify for Europe. The team's concurrent run in the UEFA Cup was also positive: they eliminated Sporting, Real Betis, Slavia Prague and Olympique Lyon in succession, before succumbing in the semi-final to Olympique Marseille, who went on to lose to Parma in the final. This semi-final was at the centre of much controversy because of a penalty awarded to the Transalpinians in the dying minutes, which allowed them to progress, leading to a violent brawl between the players after the match. In the Coppa Italia, the Bolognese were knocked out in the semi-finals, this time by Fiorentina.

For the 1999-2000 season, Sergio Buso, a former youth team coach and rossoblù goalkeeper in the 1960s, was put in charge of the team, but his adventure on the bench lasted only seven days before he was replaced by Francesco Guidolin, another former Bologna player. The team finished eleventh in the league, while in the UEFA Cup they were eliminated in the third round by Turkish side Galatasaray, who went on to win the trophy.

== 2000s ==
=== Cipollini's presidency ===
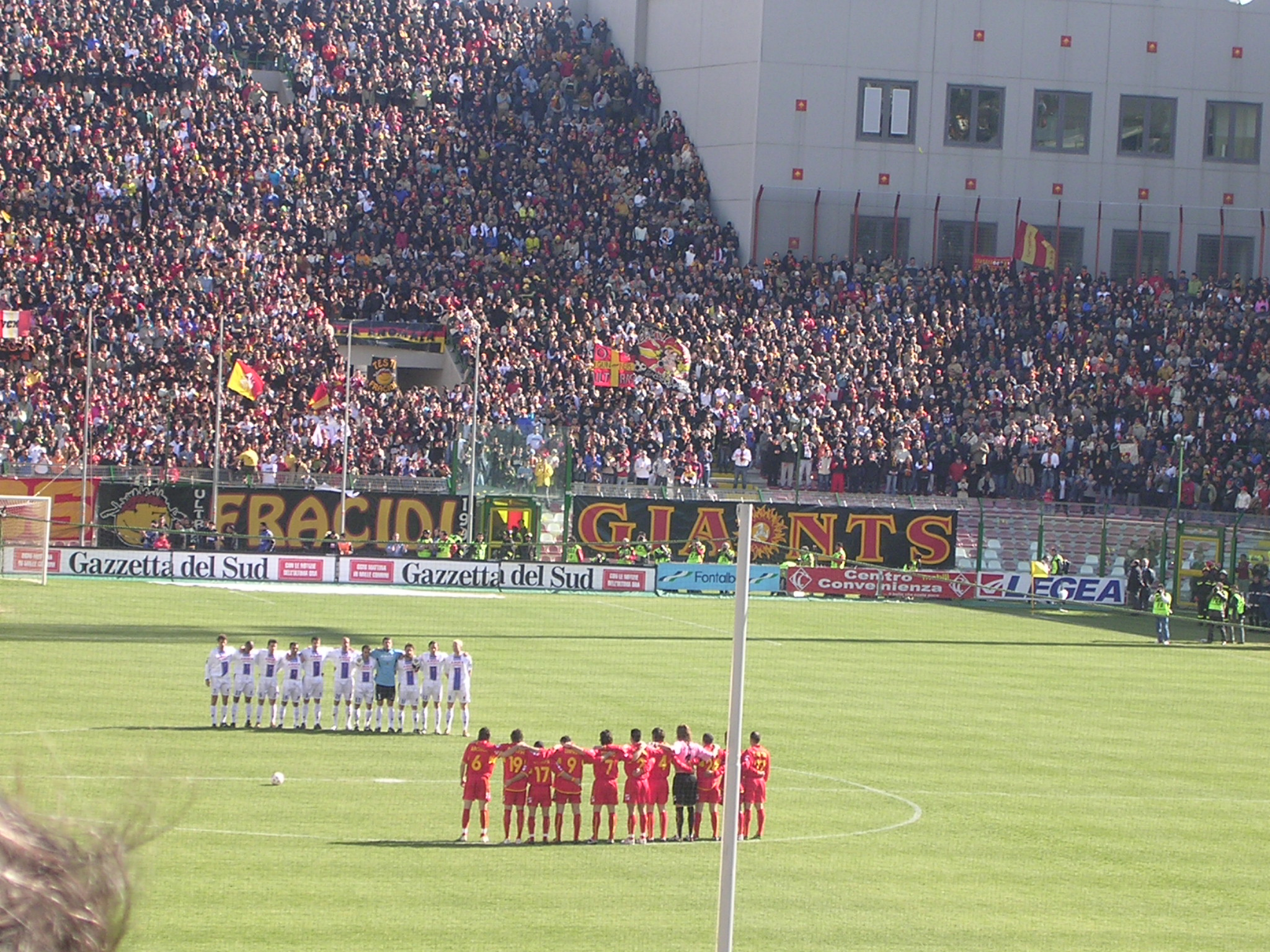
Bologna (in white) against Messina in the 2004-2005 season.

Guidolin's second season ended with a tenth place finish, and in the summer of 2001, a wave of fan protests against the management over the signing of new players led Gazzoni to resign as president and replace him with Renato Cipollini, a man he trusted. Nevertheless, the year was positive and the team fought for a place in Europe until the end, but a series of bad results, including Lazio's famous win over Inter and Bologna's defeat by Brescia, meant that the chance of playing in the Champions League and UEFA Cup was lost at the end of the season. The rossoblù's only remaining chance was a return to the Intertoto Cup, which they lost to Fulham in the final in London. After this championship, the club began a new decline which, after a few rescues, culminated in relegation to Serie B following a dramatic play-off against Parma in June 2005. With the outbreak of Calciopoli, it was revealed that Bologna's matches against Fiorentina, Juventus and Lazio had been fixed to disadvantage the rossoblù; in fact, Bologna had lost all those matches.

=== Cazzola's presidency ===
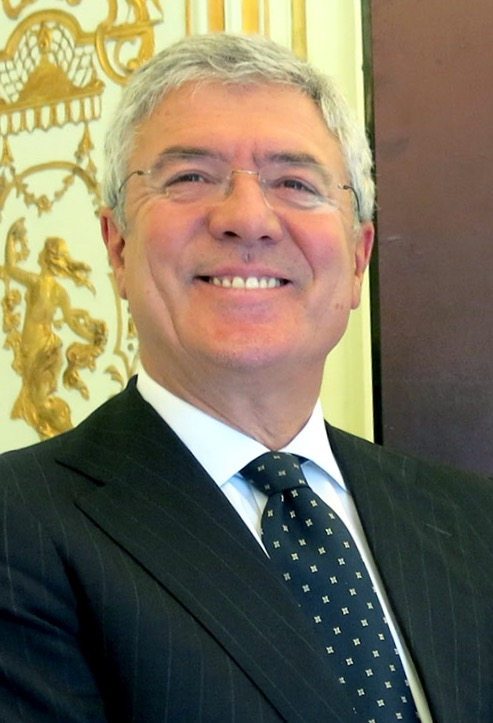
Alfredo Cazzola, the president who brought Bologna back to Serie A.

Carlo Mazzone left Bologna with the club's relegation to Serie B, with Renzo Ulivieri, who coached the club between 1994 and 1998, once again in charge. After the first few days of the 2005-2006 season, the previous president and main shareholder, Giuseppe Gazzoni Frascara, stepped down and handed over his shares to Bologna businessman Alfredo Cazzola, a well-known local entrepreneur with a keen interest in sport, who became majority shareholder and new president. The team's performances fluctuated and in January 2006 Ulivieri was replaced by Andrea Mandorlini, who was sacked after a few days and replaced by Ulivieri himself. Bologna finished the first half of the season in mid-table and missed out on the promotion play-offs. The following season, Renzo Ulivieri was still in charge, but as in the previous year, he was sacked after an unsuccessful championship and replaced by Luca Cecconi; the change did not have the desired effect, however, and the Felsinei finished seventh after spending the first half of the season in the promotion places. Coach Daniele Arrigoni was appointed to lead the team in the 2007-2008 championship. The squad included players of the calibre of Adaílton, Massimo Marazzina, Davide Bombardini and Cristian Bucchi. In their third year in Serie B, Bologna finished second thanks to a home win over Pisa, thus securing promotion to Serie A.

=== Menarini's presidency ===
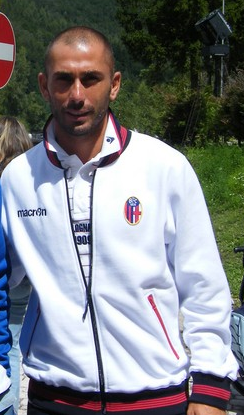
Marco Di Vaio, who would score a total of 66 goals in the red and blue jersey.

After leading Bologna back to Serie A, Cazzola reached an agreement to sell the club to minority shareholder Renzo Menarini, who made the purchase official on 2 August 2008. Cazzola remained president until 12 September, when he was succeeded by Francesca Menarini, Renzo's daughter. Daniele Arrigoni was confirmed as coach for the 2008-2009 season, but was sacked on 3 November after a 5-1 defeat to Cagliari and replaced by debutant Siniša Mihajlović. After a good start, Mihajlović was again relieved of his duties on 14 April 2009, 7 days before the end of the season, and his place was taken by Giuseppe Papadopulo, an experienced coach in rescuing teams, who had led Lecce back to Serie A in the previous season. On 31 May 2009, a 3-1 win over Catania secured Bologna's 17th place in the standings and the club's survival in the top flight. The season was characterised by the extraordinary goalscoring prowess of centre-forward Marco Di Vaio, who finished second in the league scoring charts with 24 goals and eighth in the Golden Boot award.

In the following season Bologna celebrated the 100th anniversary of its founding. Various events and exhibitions were organised and many publishing initiatives were launched. The celebrations culminated in the Centenary Grand Gala on the evening of 2 October 2009. For the following match against Genoa on 4 October, Bologna wore a replica of their first official kit, with the permission of the federation. Despite the celebrations, the season did not get off to a good start, and after 9 games coach Papadopulo was sacked and the technical direction was handed over to Franco Colomba, a former rossoblù player from the 1980s. The team made a great recovery, followed by another crisis in results, but salvation came on the penultimate day and the team finished again in seventeenth place.

== 2010s and 2020s ==
=== Three presidents in one season ===
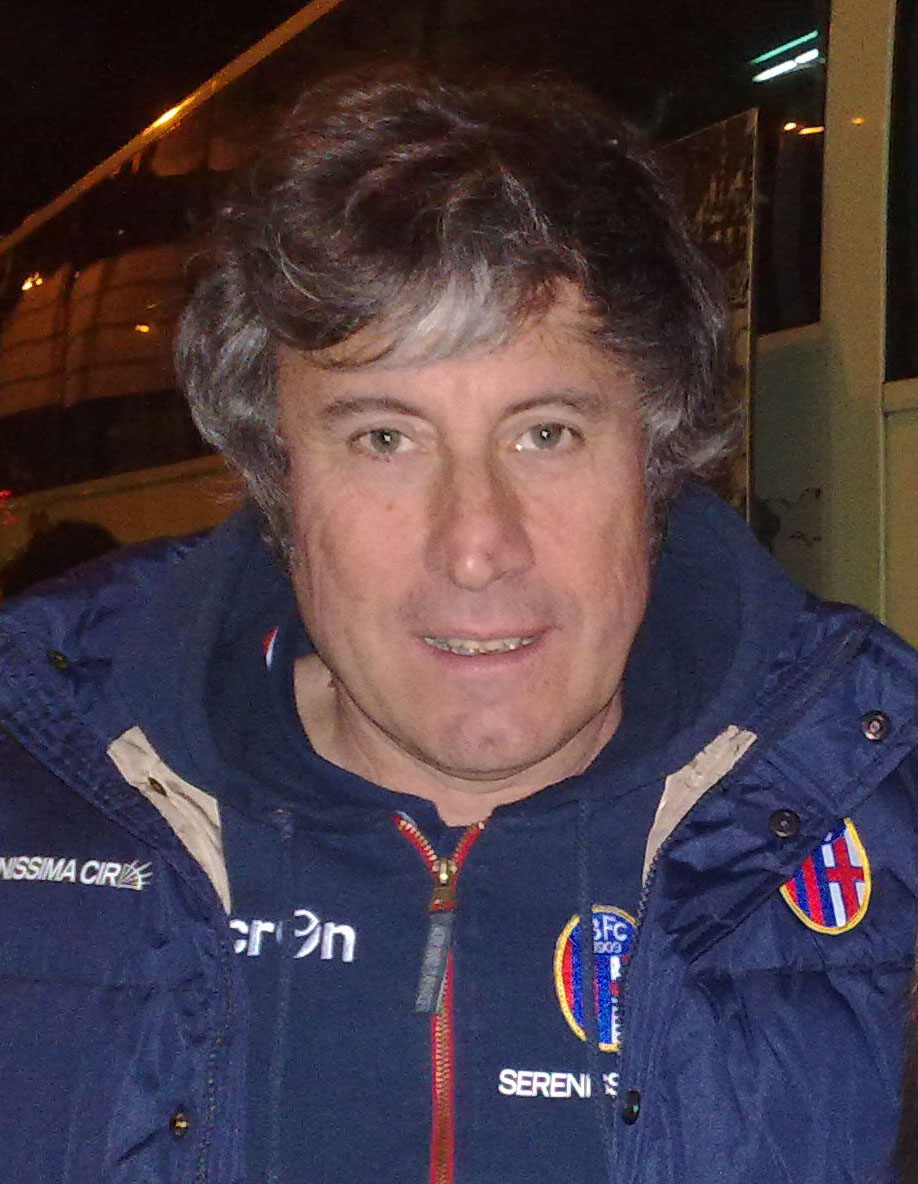
Former Bologna coach Alberto Malesani.

At the end of the championship, the Menarini family, who had long been criticised by the public and the fans, entered into negotiations to sell the club and reached an agreement with Sardinian businessman Sergio Porcedda, who took over as president on 7 July 2010 after acquiring a majority stake in the club. The new owners completely overhauled the coaching staff, bringing in men they trusted. However, on 29 August, on the eve of the first league match, coach Franco Colomba was surprisingly relieved of his duties. Initially replaced on an interim basis by youth team coach Paolo Magnani for the first match of the championship, Alberto Malesani took his place.

Porcedda's management, despite having embarked on a major overhaul and rejuvenation of the squad, found themselves completely insolvent a few months later, resulting in a 3-point penalty in the championship for late payment. By mid-November, the club was in default and on the verge of bankruptcy, and the players had not been paid for months.

The Bologna 2010 committee, organised by banker Giovanni Consorte and led by Segafredo owner Massimo Zanetti, stepped in to save the club. In December, it succeeded in buying out Porcedda and Menarini's entire stake in the club. Massimo Zanetti took over as president, and his first move was to appoint Luca Baraldi as general manager. Baraldi had held the same position during the Menarini era, but his relationship with the players was not a good one. His appointment therefore caused disappointment among the players and the new partners, who feared a collapse in results. It was precisely because of these disagreements that he resigned on 21 January 2011, to be replaced by vice-president Marco Pavignani. On 7 April 2011, following the necessary recapitalisation of the company, Bologna businessman Albano Guaraldi was appointed President in agreement with the shareholders, and on 21 May 2011 he also took over as Chief Executive Officer.

Despite the extremely uncertain and difficult situation, the team had a good championship, maintaining the unity around coach Malesani and striker Marco Di Vaio, the author of 19 goals. The team was rescued midway through the second half of the season, but a slump in results saw them finish 16th.

=== Guaraldi's presidency ===
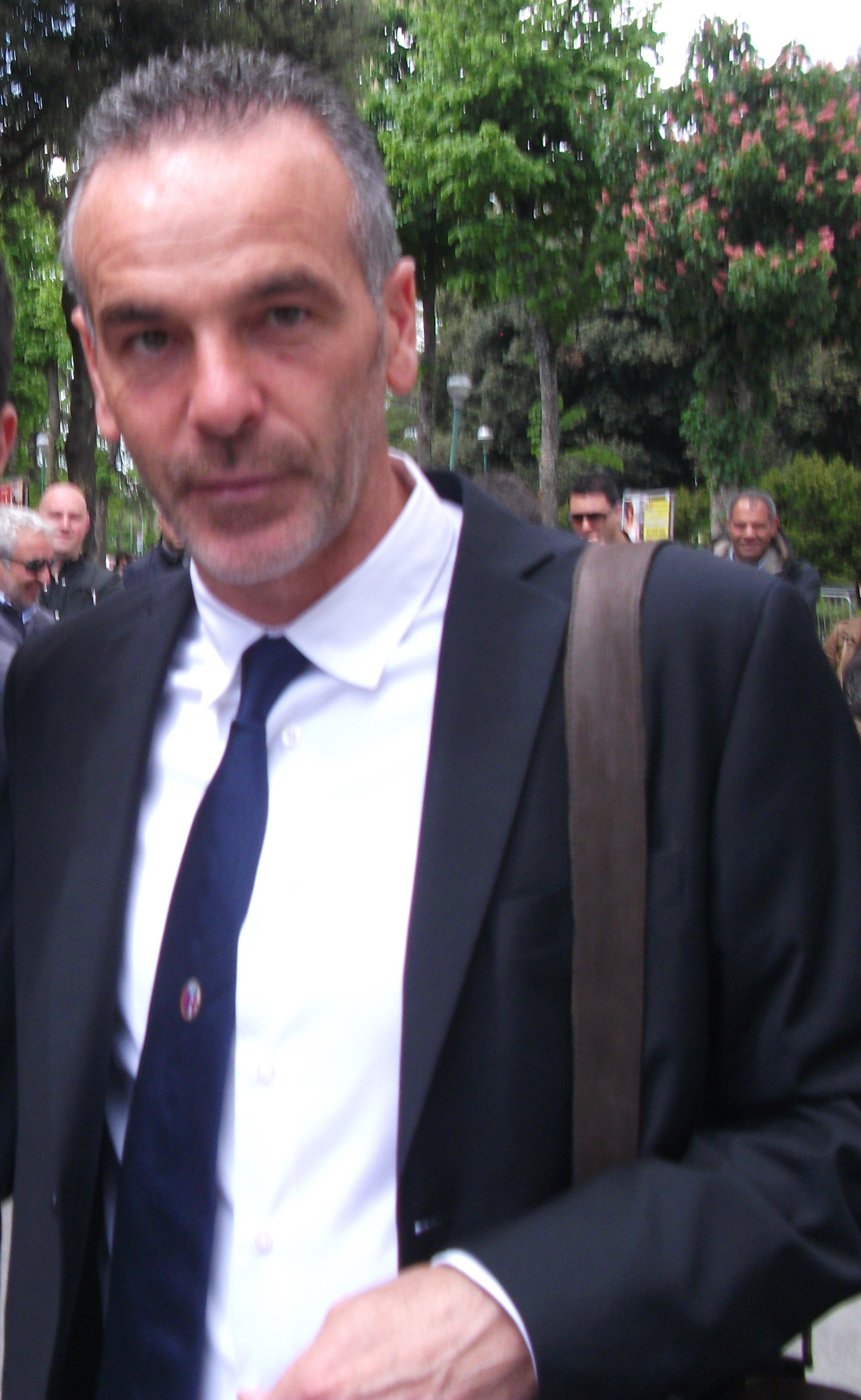
Stefano Pioli was in charge during the record 51-point season.

A new coach, Pierpaolo Bisoli, was appointed at the end of the championship. Salvatore Bagni was recruited as technical advisor. Barely two months into the job, he was sacked on 25 July due to disagreements over the budget for the summer transfer window, and Roberto Zanzi was appointed general manager and later sporting director.

Under Guaraldi's presidency, the seasons were characterised by last-minute rescues and limited ambitions, with the exception of the 2011-12 season, when the club finished in ninth place, thanks largely to the technical guidance of coach Stefano Pioli and striker Di Vaio, who enjoyed a second youth in Bologna and deservedly won an exclusive place in the hearts of the rossoblù supporters in what were otherwise very unsatisfactory years.

When the Roman striker left Bologna to end his career with Joey Saputo's Montréal Impact, the team was in crisis. After finishing thirteenth, the following season was a disaster on all fronts: the team finished second from bottom with only 29 points and only 28 goals scored.

=== Tacopina's presidency ===
The 2014-2015 season saw the arrival of a group of North American investors, represented by Canadian businessman Joey Saputo - former president of Montreal Impact, where Marco Di Vaio used to play: in fact, it was he who convinced the Canadian tycoon to invest in Bologna - and New York lawyer Joe Tacopina, with Claudio Fenucci as the new CEO and Pantaleo Corvino as the technical director. Di Vaio returned to the club in the role of club manager, having hung up his boots after ending his career in Canada. Meanwhile, Guaraldi had appointed Uruguayan coach Diego Lopez to take charge of the team.

After an up-and-down campaign in Serie B, with Delio Rossi at the helm in the final season, Bologna qualified for the play-offs, which they won with a 1-1 draw against Pescara in the final (goals from Gianluca Sansone and Cristian Pasquato), and returned to Serie A as the best placed team in the regular season.

=== Saputo's presidency ===
==== The years of Donadoni ====
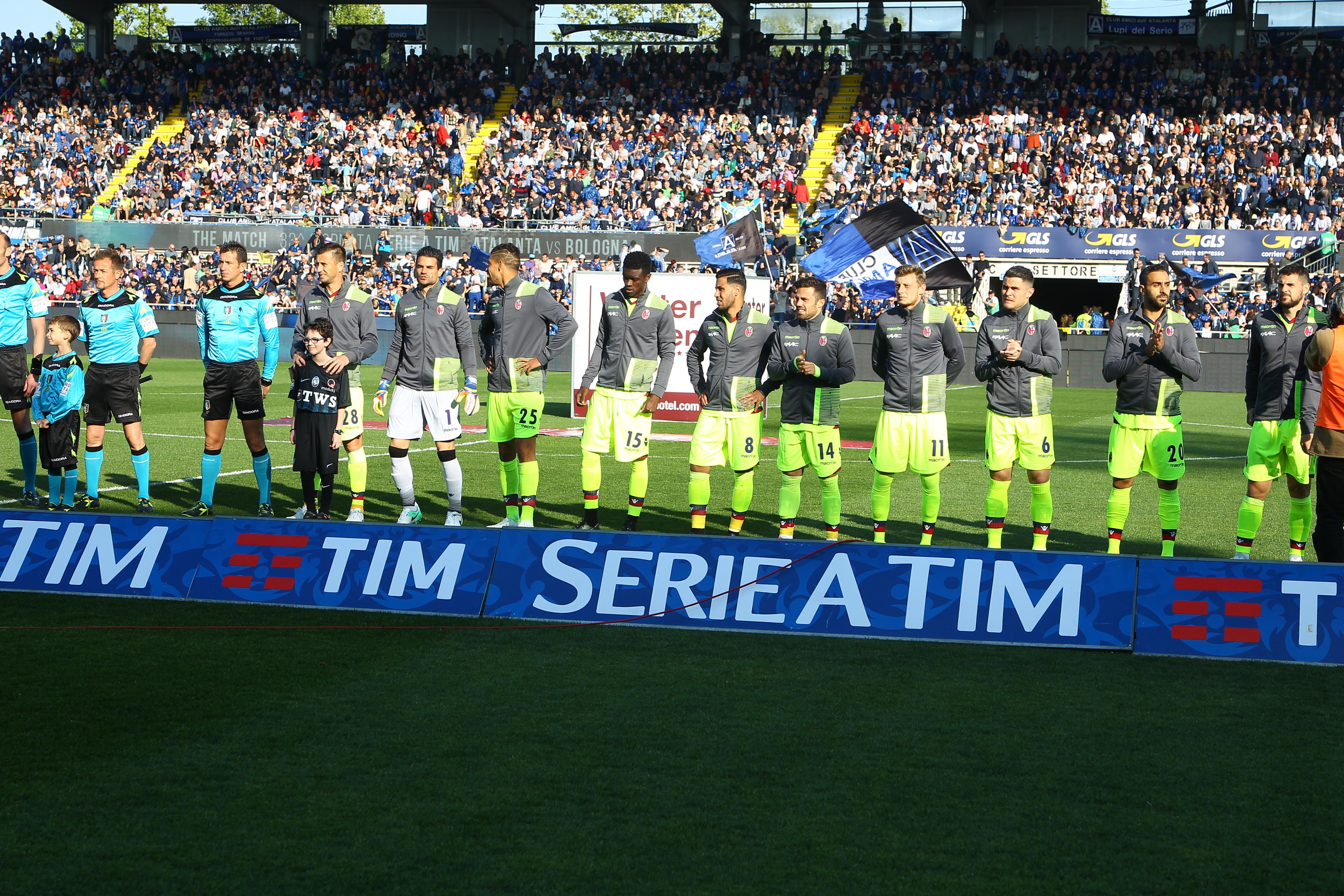
A Bologna line-up in Bergamo in the 2016-2017 season.

Shortly after the start of the season, Joe Tacopina left the president's post after a series of disagreements with Saputo, who would later become the team's president - with the role of chairman - while the American lawyer left Bologna to take over Venezia. After a difficult start with Rossi, the coach was relieved of his duties and Roberto Donadoni was appointed in his place to guarantee the club's permanence in the top flight. Salvation came at the beginning of May with a win over Empoli, after a season in which the rossoblù had won many games, including a victory over Napoli, an end to Juventus' 15-game home winning streak, and an away win against AC Milan.

The following season began well for the Felsinei, but due to a lack of players and a lack of competitiveness on the part of the teams involved in the relegation battle - which saw them ten points adrift of the third-bottom team at the end of the first half of the season - Bologna began to suffer a crisis of results, alternating unconvincing victories with heavy defeats, such as the 7-1 loss to Napoli. In the end, however, Bologna were rescued by a victory over Udinese on the 34th matchday of the season.

==== The revival with Mihajlović ====
For the 2018-2019 season, Donadoni was not confirmed as coach and the club decided to appoint Filippo Inzaghi, fresh from his experience in Serie B with Venezia, but with Inzaghi, the season started in the worst way: only 13 points in the first half of the season, with only two wins, Bologna's absolute negative record in points in the first half of the season since the introduction of three points for a win. On 1 January, Bologna set another negative record: no away wins in the whole of 2018. After 11 defeats and four months without winning, Inzaghi was sacked and Siniša Mihajlović returned to coach the club he left 10 years earlier. Under the new technical management, Bologna finished 10th. In the same season, the rossoblù youth team achieved a treble, winning the league and the second division Super Cup, as well as their second Viareggio Tournament.

The 2019-2020 season was first marked by the news of coach Mihajlović's leukaemia, discovered just before the departure for the usual summer training camp in Kastelruth; after several absences, the coach gradually returned to the bench and later to the training camp. In the early months of 2020, world football was affected and halted by the COVID-19 pandemic; faced with the disastrous spread of the epidemic in Italy, the government declared a drastic national lockdown on the following 9 March, and the following day the FIGC suspended all championships indefinitely. Almost four months later, on 22 June, Bologna resumed their championship run against Juventus, finishing in twelfth place with 47 points, their best tally since the 2011-12 season. However, the seemingly good season was marred by two negative records: the highest number of goals conceded in the league up to that point (65), and the highest number of consecutive games in which at least one goal was conceded in Serie A (33), 34 if the Coppa Italia match against Udinese is included. This season also saw the return of a Bologna player to the national team after a number of years, Riccardo Orsolini.

In the 2020-2021 season, Bologna finished 12th in the league, while the following season they finished 13th, thanks to the Arnautovic-Barrow strike duo, who combined for 20 goals (14 from Arnautovic and 6 from Barrow).

During the summer transfer window of the 2022-2023 season, Bologna sold their youngsters Aaron Hickey, Arthur Theate and Mattias Svanberg, while buying defenders Jhon Lucumí and Joaquín Sosa, midfielders Andrea Cambiaso and Charalampos Lykogiannis and striker Joshua Zirkzee. Bologna took just three points from their first five games and finished 16th, leading to Mihajlovic's dismissal.

==== The Thiago Motta era ====
On 9 September, Thiago Motta was officially appointed as Bologna's new coach. After a difficult start, the Italian-Brazilian coach managed to turn around the club's fortunes, finishing ninth in Serie A with a record 54 points.

Motta was retained as coach, and new players arrived from the market, notably Riccardo Calafiori from Basel, Remo Freuler from Nottingham Forest and Alexis Saelemaekers from AC Milan. Bologna had an excellent league season, with an even higher points average than last year, thanks in part to the likes of Zirkzee, Lewis Ferguson and Orsolini. On 12 May 2024, the day after beating Napoli 2-0, they officially qualified for the UEFA Champions League for the first time in 59 years following Roma's home defeat by Atalanta.

== See also ==
- 2023–24 Bologna FC 1909 season
- Allemandi Case

== Videography ==
- Bologna FC 100 anni di storia (DVD). Corriere dello Sport. 2009.
- Marrese, Emilio; Muran, Paolo; Cristiano, Cristiano (2016). Mi chiamo Renato, i 90 anni Rock'n'gol dello stadio di Bologna (DVD). La Repubblica.

== Bibliography ==
- Bertuzzi, Marco; Monti, Federico (2017). La maglia del Bologna. Storia delle divise rossoblù. Edizioni Minerva. ISBN 978-88-7381-866-3.
- Carlo Caliceti (April 2001). "L'altra faccia del pallone". Calcio 2000 (4 [40]): 53–55. ISSN 1122-1712.
- Carlo Felice Chiesa (2009). La storia dei cento anni: 1909-2009 Bologna Football Club, il secolo rossoblu. Bologna: Minerva Edizioni.
- Carlo Felice Chiesa (2019). Bologna Centodieci. L'epopea, la gloria, le immagini inedite. Edizioni Minerva. ISBN 978-88-332-4184-5.
- La Biblioteca del Calcio - Un gioco da ragazzi. I campionati italiani della stagione 1909-10. Geo Edizioni. 2001.
- Kristian Koller; Fabian Brändle (2015). Goal! A Cultural and Social History of Modern Football. Translated by David Bachrach. Washington: The Catholic University of America Press. ISBN 978-0-8132-2727-6.
- Calciatori 1979-80 (riedizione speciale per "La Gazzetta dello Sport" ed.). Modena: Franco Cosimo Panini Editore. 2005.
- Giuseppe Quercioli, ed. (2006). Bologna e il suo stadio: ottant'anni dal Littoriale al Dall'Ara. La storia di un grande monumento della città. Bologna: Pendragon. ISBN 978-88-8342-499-1. LCCN 2006403798.
- Marco Sappino, ed. (2000). Dizionario del calcio italiano. Baldini & Castoldi. ISBN 978-88-8089-862-7. Archived from the original on 24 March 2015.
- Baccolini, Luca (2018). Il romanzo del grande Bologna. Dal 1909 a oggi la storia di un mito. Newton Compton Editori.
