= Felsner =

Felsner is a German language habitational surname for someone who lived in a rocky place or by a cliff (Fels). Notable people with the name include:

- Brian Felsner (born 1972), American ice hockey player
- Denny Felsner (born 1970), American ice hockey player
- Hermann Felsner (1889–1977), Austrian football player and manager
- Johannes Felsner (1998), Austrian football player
