= Allemandi Case =

1920s Italian football scandal

The Allemandi case was one of the major scandals in the history of Italian soccer and one of the first in order of time, having occurred before the establishment of the “one-round” Serie A (1929). The case involved the revocation of the Scudetto won by Torino in the 1926–1927 season and has been the subject of debate due to ambiguities in the available documentation. The controversial outcome of the court case led, in the following decades, to several attempts to reopen the investigation into the matter, but so far all were unsuccessful.

== The chronicle of the scandal ==
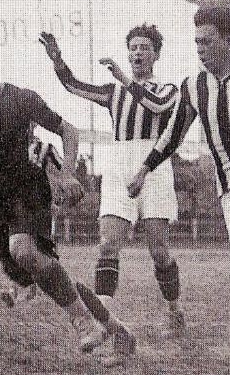
Luigi Allemandi, Juventus fullback featured in the scandal

The affair revolves around a combination orchestrated by Guido Nani, Torino's auditor as well as a personal friend of Granata president Enrico Marone Cinzano, and Francesco Gaudioso, a Sicilian student at the Polytechnic University in the Piedmontese capital who was on good terms with several Juventus players, including in particular promising fullback Luigi Allemandi; Gaudioso and Allemandi were both staying at a guesthouse in Piazzetta Madonna degli Angeli.

According to the chronicle of the time, Dr. Nani agreed with Gaudioso for the latter to hijack in favor of the “Toro” the result of the Derby della Mole (Torino-Juventus) scheduled for June 5, 1927, in exchange for 35,000 liras to be distributed to the people involved in the scam; 25,000 liras were given in advance to the student, while the remaining 10,000 liras agreed upon would be delivered after the Granata won the scudetto (before the indicted match, Torino was leading the standings with 10 points and followed by both Bologna and Juventus). The derby ended with a 2 to 1 comeback victory for Torino (Allemandi, although defeated, was reported among the best players on the field) and about a month later, on July 3, the “Toro” became champions of Italy;

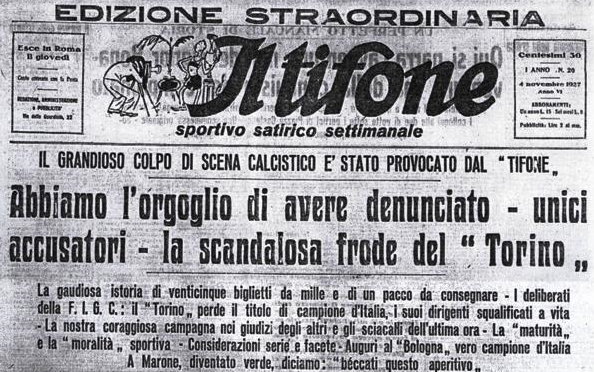
Front page of the special edition of the sports paper “Il Tifone”

For unclear reasons, however, Nani allegedly refused to pay the remaining 10,000 lire; as a result, Gaudioso decided to reveal the existence of the combined sua sponte to Renato Ferminelli, the Turin correspondent of the newspapers Lo Sport of Milan and Il Tifone of Rome, as well as a lodger in the same student hostel: the self-report aimed to induce the Turin manager to pay his due for fear that a scandal would break out (an erroneous version of the facts states, instead, that the journalist had learned of the scam by eavesdropping on an argument between Allemandi and Gaudioso).

Having sniffed out the scoop, Ferminelli, who was moreover on bad terms with Torino (since the Granata club had not granted him for a quid pro quo the season's accreditation for matches at the Filadelfia Stadium), gradually gathered Gaudioso's confidences and published in the two magazines he worked for, between July 29 and September 22, 1927, a series of articles with allusive titles (such as “Prelude. There's Something Rotten in Denmark” and ‘Sinfonia’), in which he sibylline-described the Granata club's malfeasance. According to the reporter, Marone Cinzano was also implicated in the misdeed as the author of a telegram addressed to Nani with the mysterious meaning, "Suspend parcel delivery."

== The judicial proceedings ==
=== The sports process ===
The report triggered an investigation by the Italian Football Federation in September. At that time, at the head of the FIGC was Leandro Arpinati, a Fascist hierarch as well as podestà of the city of Bologna (which became the headquarters of the Federation in 1926 by the will of the president himself), who was assisted by the secretary general Giuseppe Zanetti. After a series of investigations carried out in Piedmont, Lombardy, and Sicily, the two executives conducted several interrogations.

The first witness was Ferminelli himself, who explained that Gaudioso had told him that the players involved in the affaire were Juventus players Federico Munerati and Piero Pastore, who had distinguished themselves negatively in the derby della Mole (the latter, in particular, was sent off for a reaction foul). Gaudioso's turn then came: the student denied what had happened at first, but later decided to confess and named Nani; the Turin adviser confirmed the bribery had taken place, specified that he did not know who the players involved were, and added that the entire Piedmontese club was informed of the combine, except that he later denied it and explained that he was the only manager responsible for the misdeed. Gaudioso, moreover, after declaring that he had given the money to Munerati, Pastore and his friend Allemandi, claimed that he had kept the money for himself and finally recanted further, accusing Allemandi alone. The three aforementioned players were questioned: it was learned that Munerati had received a case of wine and liquor as a gift from Granata president Cinzano, while Pastore was accused of having a bet on the Juventus defeat.

==== Judgment of the first instance ====
The judicial verdict came on November 4, 1927, at the end of an emergency meeting of the Federal Council that had begun the day before at the Casa del Fascio in Bologna, during which the decisive talks were held with Gaudioso, Nani, Allemandi, Munerati, and Pastore. The Direttorio Federale decreed the revocation of the Scudetto to Torino for proven bribery of unspecified Juventus players on the occasion of the June 5 stracittadina, as well as the disqualification for life for the members of Torino's board of directors in office in May and June 1927 (including president Enrico Marone Cinzano, vice-president Eugenio Vogliotti, secretary Pietro Zanoncelli, and adviser Guido Nani). No action was taken against Juventus, however, since the management of the Bianconeri club had been a victim, not an active participant, in the misdeed.

The Direttorio Federale, having ascertained also by confession of Dr. Nani, Turin's adviser, that he paid to Mr. Gaudioso, who also confessed, 25,000 lire intended for some of the Juventus players to illegitimately assure Turin's victory in the June 5 match, resolves to strip Turin of the title of absolute champion of Italy, for the 1926-27 sporting year.

— Official statement of the Italian Football Federation (FIGC), November 4, 1927

The Directory, moreover, ruled that the result of the match under investigation and the final league standings would not be changed and that the Scudetto would remain perpetually “unassigned,” the only case in Italian soccer until a second episode was repeated in 2005. Arpinati motivated the decision by implying that other matches, besides the one at the center of the investigation, appeared to have been falsified and that therefore the irregularity of the championship in toto had been established. The title, as a result, was not given to second-place Bologna, as FIGC and IOC regulations stipulated, nor was it given to third-place Juventus, which would have become first in the standings if it had obtained a forfeited victory in the incriminated derby.

[...] The result of the investigation is such that it brought back the precise impression that certain championship matches distorted the outcome of the championship itself. Therefore, Bologna will not have the title taken away from Torino; the 1926-27 championship will not have its winner.

— Statement by FIGC president Leandro Arpinati reported in La Gazzetta dello Sport on November 7, 1927.

==== Society ====
- Torino FC: Revocation of the 1926-1927 Scudetto and payment of 10,000 liras for investigation expenses.
- Enrico Marone Cinzano (Torino president): disqualified for life (amnestied April 22, 1928).
- Eugenio Vogliotti (vice-president Torino): disqualified for life (amnestied April 22, 1928).
- Pietro Zanoncelli (secretary Torino): disqualified for life (amnestied April 22, 1928).
- Guido Nani (auditor Torino): disqualified for life (amnestied April 22, 1928).
- Another 17 members of the Torino Board of Directors in the months of May–June 1927: disqualification for life (amnestied February 3, 1928).
- 2 other members of the Torino Board of Directors in the months after June 1927: disqualification for 2 years (amnestied on February 3, 1928).

==== Judgment of the second instance ====
In an interview with the Gazzetta dello Sport on November 6, Arpinati announced that the Juventus player involved in the crime was Luigi Allemandi and that he intended to disqualify him for life. Allemandi, who had moved from Juventus to Inter in the summer, prepared a lengthy defense brief in which he emphasized his excellent performance in the incriminated match and disputed the reliability of Gaudioso's words against him, but Arpinati rejected the request for acquittal on Nov. 21, citing as material evidence of the wrongdoing the alleged fragments of a letter in which the player, addressing Gaudioso, allegedly claimed payment of the initial fee of 25,000 lire; this missive was allegedly found by the president himself following an inspection at the guesthouse in Piazzetta Madonna degli Angeli. On the same day, Munerati and Pastore, the other two Bianconeri involved in the investigation, were also lightly punished: in fact, Arpinati sanctioned both of them with a formal reprimand, respectively, for the gift they received from the president of Torino and for the transgression related to soccer betting.

The Federal Directorate confirms the previous decisions and disqualifies for life Luigi Allemandi, of whose guilt the evidence has been fully achieved; calls the player Munerati to a more exact understanding of his duties in that a registered footballer cannot accept gifts of any amount or nature from members of other clubs; deplores and prohibits the malpractice of betting even of small amounts, especially those held against the fate of one's colors and admonishes for this transgression the player Pastore [...].

— Official communiqué of the Italian Football Federation (FIGC), November 21, 1927.

According to the official version of the trial, Allemandi said at first that he did not remember any message, then admitted that he had written a letter to Gaudioso about the nascent affaire but did not remember its exact contents, and when he asked to be allowed to read the text of the missive in person, Arpinati refused that concession, believing that the footballer's guilt had now been proven, as well as rejecting the request for a confrontation between Allemandi and Gaudioso. Later, Allemandi supplemented his memorial by claiming that the content of the letter to Gaudioso had been decontextualized, as it did not refer to an implication in the scandal on his part, but rather Munerati and Pastore's.

[...] In that [room] of Allemandi's some scraps of paper were noticed in the wastebasket, scraps of paper that were collected thinking that they might have had a reference with the matter of interest. In fact, by gluing these scraps of paper onto transparent paper (work that lasted a good eighteen hours) it was possible to reconstruct a letter in which Allemandi complained about the non-payment of the twenty-five thousand lire, claiming that he had collaborated and not a little in the conquest of the Scudetto by the Granata. [...]

— Statement by FIGC Secretary General Giuseppe Zanetti, reported many years after the scandal.

==== Society ====
Confirmation of first instance ruling.

==== Executives ====
Confirmation of the judgment of the first instance.

==== Players ====
- Luigi Allemandi (former Juventus): disqualified for life (amnestied April 22, 1928).
- Federico Munerati (Juventus): official recall.
- Piero Pastore (Juventus): official recall.

=== The criminal trial and the two amnesties ===
On November 9, 1927, the directors of Torino sanctioned by the Federation issued an official communiqué in which, claiming their extraneousness to the bribery work carried out by Nani, they announced that they would present a petition to the FIGC Directorate to ascertain individual responsibility. Arpinati nipped the initiative in the bud and suggested that they take legal action (since at the time of the events there was no arbitration clause preventing federal members from turning to ordinary justice to settle disputes inherent in sporting activity). Marone Cinzano and other members of the club filed, therefore, a libel suit against Nani, and on January 13, 1928, a trial on the Allemandi affaire was held in the criminal courts.

After the conviction, I would have had at my disposal the amnesty of 1927 but I did not avail myself of it because proof did not come from the various parties involved that I had not participated in the act. Various circumstances convinced me to the contrary, first of all a telegram sent by Marone and directed to Nani; the fact that Gaudioso, on the strength of a written contract that Nani had issued to him, soon turned to him and got the money he had been promised; thirdly, the consideration that it is strange that Comm. Marone, who explained the above-mentioned telegram as referring to a parcel of securities, telegraphed for this matter to the Nani instead of to his father; fourth the fact that the money came from Vogliotti, who was also on the board of directors of the Torino.

— Testimony of FIGC president Leandro Arpinati at the January 13, 1928 hearing at the Bologna court.

In the Bologna court, the auditor repeated that he had orchestrated the malfeasance on his own, exonerating everyone except secretary Zanoncelli, who had given him 20,000 lire for the buying and selling of the match (the remaining 5,000 would be paid by Nani out of his pocket). Drawn in, Zanoncelli testified that he had borrowed the money from vice-president Vogliotti, without explaining, however, the real reason for the request then defended himself by saying that Gaudioso had, in turn, contacted him to propose a combine before April 3, 1927, first leg derby (won 1–0 by Juventus) and that, after talking it over with Nani, he had decided not to go ahead with the scam; it was then the auditor who negotiated independently with the student on the occasion of the return match, except for later asserting before the members that he had received authorization to do so from Marone Cinzano himself. Finally, federal president Arpinati intervened and explained that he had condemned the entire Torino board of directors because he was convinced for various reasons that Nani had not acted alone, and Granata president Marone Cinzano, who proved with documentary evidence that the infamous “Suspend package delivery” message did not conceal anything irregular, but referred to commercial titles.

The next day Marone Cinzano and other associates, believing themselves satisfied with Nani's statements that exonerated everyone except Zanoncelli, pledged to drop the defamation charges; Zanetti's opinion, however, was that the waiver took place “because the evidence provided to the Tribunal by the federal leaders was too clear, evidence such as to admit no doubt as to the guilt of the punished.” In any case, on February 3, 1928, the FIGC announced, applying the amnesty decree of August 26, 1927, the cancellation of the disqualifications of Torino's directors, except, however, for those of Marone Cinzano and Vogliotti, as well as those of Nani and Zanoncelli; for the Direttorio Federale the Torino president and his deputy would not have proven their “complete extraneousness” to the offense, unlike the other members of the Granata management.

Having the below-named former advisors of Torino FC with the required clarity given proof of their complete extraneousness to what had provoked, even against them, the punitive sanctions referred to in the communiqué dated 4-11-1927, the Federal Directorate applies the provisions of the decree of August 26, 1927, against Messrs. Bassi avv. Filippo, Barattia cav. Giacomo, Colonna sig. Aldo, Gazzotti sig. Carlo, Laugeri dott. Melanio, Norzi sig. Gustavo, Tibò rag. Carlo Vittorio, Giovannini rag. Cesare, Vastapane comm. Giuseppe, Cora sig. Mario, Billotti sig. Angelo, Derossi cav. Luigi, Giordano gr. uff. Filippo, Morelli di Popolo count Vittorio, Ramella comm. avv. Umberto, Gobbi comm. Gerardo, who are therefore understood to have been reinstated in all their social and federal attributes.

— Official statement of the Federazione Italiana Giuoco Calcio, February 3, 1928.

The quenelle finally came to an end on April 22, 1928, when, on the occasion of Christmas in Rome, CONI president Lando Ferretti promulgated an amnesty aimed at all sportsmen and sportswomen affected by disciplinary sanctions: among the beneficiaries were Allemandi himself and the four Torino managers still under disqualification (other sources mistakenly trace the clemency to the Italian national team's bronze medal at the Summer Olympics that year). Zanetti asserted that this measure was granted solely because of Allemandi's mother's heartfelt pleas for clemency, addressed to Ferretti, the Duce, Prince Umberto, and even the king of Italy, although the footballer, in the decades that followed, repeatedly disputed the outcome of the scandal, always proclaiming himself innocent.

== Controversy ==
=== The unassigned scudetto ===
On the reasons for not reassigning the title to Bologna, opposite inferences were made.

On the one hand, there were those who, believing in the good faith and probity of Leandro Arpinati, thought that the federal president prevented the awarding of the Rossoblù club not only because the entire championship appeared in his eyes from being invalidated, but to prevent obvious suspicions of partiality from falling on his person since he was a well-known Bologna supporter. Confirming this interpretation would be Arpinati's reputation as an incorruptible man, as well as a critical voice within Fascism and a friend of figures not aligned with the regime (among them Secretary Zanetti, who was not a member of the single party): all these qualities would later cost the politician his fall from grace and confinement.

On the other hand, some accused Arpinati of having engineered or at least “inflated,” the scandal involving Allemandi for the very purpose of favoring Bologna, insinuating that the failure of the Emilian club to be crowned after the title was revoked from Torino would have been desired by high-ranking hierarchs, perhaps by Benito Mussolini himself, fearful that Arpinati's conduct, which had also been subject to criticism earlier, might come to discredit the image and authority of the Fascist system.

=== The Pinasco case ===
According to the latter thesis, the federal president allegedly tried to harm Bologna's rivals as early as June 8, 1927, when the Italian Technical Refereeing Committee decreed the repetition of the May 15 match between the Piedmontese and the Emilians (won 1–0 by the “Toro”) because of an alleged technical error. Genovese match director Giacomo Pinasco, questioned by the body as many as twenty-three days after the match, allegedly admitted that he had not signaled an offside in the circumstance of the Granata goal, as he was distracted by the complaints of the Rossoblù team about a phantom goal that had just been denied to it; however, the official version of the assembly was resoundingly denied by Pinasco himself, who stated in an interview with La Stampa that he considered the Torino goal to be regular and the previous non-assignment of a goal to the Bolognese to be correct. “Carlin” Bergoglio, a historical signature of the Guerin Sportivo, ironically commented on the surreal situation:

The CITA, only when it read the outcome of the Torino-Juventus match, noticed a technical error in the Torino-Bologna match, which occurred almost a month earlier.

— (Carlo Bergoglio in Guerin Sportivo, June 1927)

Ligurian referees called a meeting in protest to CITA and in solidarity with their colleague, but the Federal Directorate intervened, threatening forced resignations for those attending the meeting and suspending Pinasco “until further notice.” Finally, on June 30, Arpinati irrevocably ruled the replay of Torino-Bologna and punished the match director with the withdrawal of his card for having rendered different versions of the match's proceedings.

The replay of the annulled match was held on July 3 and saw a further Torino victory, with a goal on a penalty kick, which was decisive in winning the later revoked Scudetto: the referee of this match was Carlo Dani, Turin-born and living in Genoa, who had already been the protagonist on January 16 of granting the Piedmontese a decisive penalty kick during another challenge against the Emilians Just the penalty kick that sanctioned the tricolor title for the Granata generated further controversy, as it turned out to be generous to many reporters; in particular, Renato Ferminelli commented:

A sure interpreter of all the fans of the Kingdom, except those of Torino, Il Tifone sends fraternal greetings to the fans of Bologna, who were beaten in the decisive game of the championship, by an unfair penalty [...]

— (Renato Ferminelli in Il Tifone, July 1927)

Arpinati's defenders argue that the very appointment of Dani, which seemed in retrospect to be compensation for the apparent favoritism granted by CITA to Bologna, would be evidence that the federal president had a super part biased behavior in handling this scandal and the Allemandi scandal. Consequently, when Arpinati did not award the Scudetto forfeited to the Bolognese, deeming the tournament distorted, he would have referred both to the illicit devising by Guido Nani and to occult pressures that would have determined the Turin-Bologna re-match. In this regard, Ferminelli again defended the actions of the FIGC president in the Pinasco case from what he called a “campaign staged by some newspapers against the alleged maneuvers of the federal bodies.”

For Arpinati's detractors, on the contrary, he would only have sought to remedy the image damage caused by the refereeing affair, and his conduct would have proved to be non-neutral on other occasions as well. According to some speculation, the hierarch would have exploited his political ascendancy to enable Bologna to win two tricolor titles against Genoa and Torino, respectively in the 1924–1925 seasons (the infamous Scudetto of the Pistols, marred by sports and institutional scandals) and 1928-1929 (the Granata filed a complaint, which was rejected by Ottorino Barassi's Superior Divisions Directorate, for alleged impropriety by the Felsine player Giuseppe Martelli in the final playoff). In these circumstances, as with the Pinasco affair, Arpinati's accusers have never been able to prove the occurrence of undue interference by the federal presidency in decisions made by other bodies(especially since, in the case of the 1925 championship, Arpinati was not even present in the FIGC organizational chart).

=== The suspicions about Rosetta ===
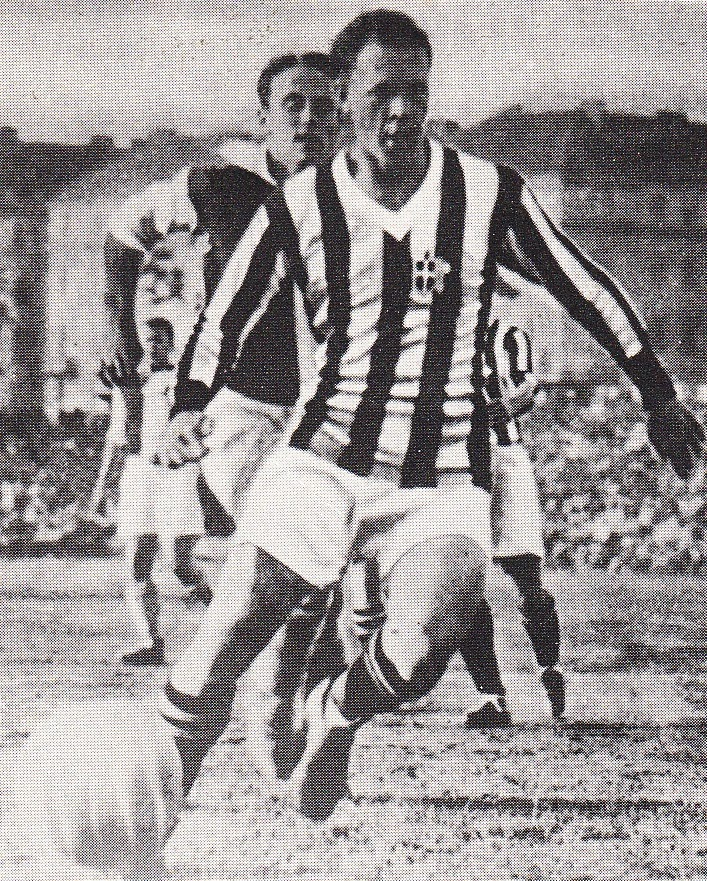
Virginio Rosetta, Allemandi's backline partner at Juventus.

Some accounts have suggested that Virginio Rosetta was also involved, based on his interactions with Gaudioso, though no formal charges were brought against him. Rosetta had enabled Torino to make it a momentary 1–1 draw in the stracittadina by spreading his legs as Mihály Balacics free-kick pass, and he was among the first people to be questioned by investigators, except he emerged unscathed from the inquiry while accusing Allemandi of proposing that he participate in the scam.

One hypothesis in this regard is that Allemandi, in reality, would not have participated in the combine, having, on the contrary, distinguished himself as one of the best athletes in the derby, or he would have simply acted as an intermediary between Gaudioso and the alleged players involved, including Rosetta. Arpinati, therefore, would have exploited Allemandi as a scapegoat because the latter was not a member of the National Fascist Party, while Rosetta would have been pardoned because he was considered the best Italian defender at the time, as well as a morally unassailable figure.

In this regard, Torino midfielder Adolfo Baloncieri and journalist Gianni Brera theorized that the affair involved the disqualification of Allemandi alone among Juventus players, moreover applied when he had just moved to Inter and amnestied after five months, due to “fierce rivalries between influential political and industrial figures” and “subtle mutual blackmail.” Some sources, more precisely, refer to an apparent conflict of interest of an entrepreneurial nature that would have tied Leandro Arpinati to the Juventus president Edoardo Agnelli in those years: Agnelli had sold to Arpinati the ownership of Stabilimenti Poligrafici Riuniti, publisher of the Bolognese newspaper il Resto del Carlino.

Was corruption proven? Then why was the alleged perpetrator later amnestied, leaving the guilty verdict against the team? How had it been determined during the investigation that the suspect's behavior resulted in one of the best athletes on the field in the incriminated game? The truth has never been known, nor will it ever be known. One dubious fact had presented itself to the investigators: that of suspecting another athlete besides the accused who, because of his moral uprightness, was unassailable. The dilemma was hastily resolved. Someone talked and perhaps said more than they knew. Conclusion? The revocation of the title. The truth was that underlying the scandal were fierce rivalries between influential political and industrial figures. The sport bore the brunt of it, and sportsmen and women of sense still look with suspicious questioning at the stain that the bare language of statistics reports as an unworthy mark of sporting infamy.

— (Adolfo Baloncieri, Brera, op. cit.)

At this point, it does not seem necessary to be Sherlock Holmes to ascertain how it went down, and immediately thereafter to understand how Allemandi could have been able to soldier in the Inter side of Giovanni Mauro, vice-president of the Federation and fearsome referee chief. Subtle reciprocal blackmail had left Juventus with the most classy full-back [Rosetta] and prevented Bologna from acquiring a full-back [Allemandi] who would have been an irresistible pairing with his Monzeglio at the 1934 World Cup.

— (Gianni Brera, Brera, op. cit.)

=== The mysterious message and the fate of the bribe ===
The origin of the missive used as the queen's proof of Allemandi's guilt also remains unclear, as well as the fate of the first installment of the bribe Nani gave Gaudioso and the reason why the Turin executive did not pay the second.

Regarding the letter, Allemandi reiterated that he had not been allowed to view it and claimed that the owners of the hostel in Piazzetta Madonna degli Angeli told him that, contrary to Giuseppe Zanetti's claims, it was not President Arpinati who found the compromising document, but rather it was Gaudioso himself who went to Bologna to deliver it to the Federation. As for the bribe, on the other hand, the pension holders reported that Gaudioso had suddenly become rich, having completely paid off his debts and bought clothes and luxury items, while Allemandi denied that he had pocketed any dirty money, debunked the rumor that he had bought a car thanks to the illicit deal, and speculated as to why the remaining 10,000 lire had not been paid: Gaudioso allegedly prospected Nani about the scam by naming Allemandi to be credible, however, after the latter's excellent game, the Torino manager allegedly realized he had been deceived and refused to pay Gaudioso what had been agreed upon.

In his defense brief, Allemandi at first professed himself certain that the derby had taken place in complete regularity and that the match had simply been boasted by Gaudioso, to earn for himself the 35,000 lire, but after his failed acquittal he clarified:

Pur non avendo elementi precisi per avanzare dei sospetti, io dico che le casse di bottiglie non sono denaro ma sono l'equivalente di denaro; dico che fra le mie gambe non passarono palloni portatori di vittoria; dico che il comunicato federale parla di scommesse accertate a carico di Pastore mentre la scommessa a carico mio resta una calunnia di Gaudioso.

— (Luigi Allemandi)

=== Allemandi's incident ===
A journalistic investigation published in the magazine Il Campione in 1957 examined a little-known fact, which helped to leave doubts about Allemandi's involvement in the scandal:

The day before the game, Allemandi had had an accident. While boating on the Po toward Moncalieri in the company of a friend he had been caught in a rapid. He had failed to keep himself in line and the boat, hitting a rock, had capsized. He had drunk a lot of water. Reaching the shore he had been seized by vomiting fits. On Sunday morning he was still upset; his teammates, noticing his pallor and the stains on his suit, had advised him not to take the field. If Allemandi had been involved in the match market he would have had a convenient loophole by not participating in the match. Instead, he wanted to take the field and fought from the first minute to the last like a lion.

— (Cesare Cauda and Emilio Speroni, “I didn't take the money,” The Champion, December 1957)

In this regard, in 1991, some thirteen years after Allemandi's death, it was Torino striker Gino Rossetti who told an anecdote in favor of his past rival:

They said that one of Juve's people, Allemandi, had sold the game. False. He kept threatening, “If you come near me, I'll break your legs.” Far from sold, he had played with his teeth.

— (Gino Rossetti)

== Requests for title reassignment ==
Over time, several requests for the reattribution of the revoked Scudetto have periodically followed, both by Torino (due to the alleged irregularity of the sports process) and Bologna (due to the failure to award the title to the runner-up). As early as 1949, during Grande Torino's funeral, Ottorino Barassi's FIGC promised to reopen the case in favor of the Granata club, but that solemn pledge was not followed through. In 1964, however, the editor-in-chief of the Gazzetta dello Sport (as well as the son of Arpinati's “right-hand man”) Gualtiero Zanetti suggested to Federal President Giuseppe Pasquale that the Scudetto struggle between Bologna and Inter, both first at the end of the championship, be resolved by exceptionally awarding the 1964 title to Inter and the 1927 title to Bologna: this proposal, initially welcomed, was eventually rejected and a play-off was opted for as per regulatory practice.

On October 17, 2015, Granata president Urbano Cairo, on the occasion of the laying of the foundation stone of the new Filadelfia Stadium, announced the resumption of the battle for the reassignment of the Scudetto; in this regard, federal president Carlo Tavecchio guaranteed the FIGC's willingness to look into the matter. On April 28, 2017, President Cairo forwarded a formal petition to the football federation to obtain the return of the revoked title, which will be followed by the appointment of a federal commission dedicated to the dispute; at the end of the investigation, the federal council will be called to express its opinion. The process suffered a setback during the long commissioning of the Federcalcio bodies, which ended in October 2018 with the election of Gabriele Gravina as president. In the following month, November, Torino's initiative was joined by Bologna, which in turn claimed the disputed title.

During the federal council meeting on January 30, 2019, President Gravina proposed the establishment of an ad hoc commission to analyze, with a historical-scientific approach, both the 1927 Scudetto claims of Torino and Bologna and those of Lazio and Genoa related to the 1915 and 1925 championships; the collegial body was established the following May 30, and the vice-president of the Football Museum Foundation Matteo Marani was appointed to coordinate the university professors who make it up. In the spring of 2021, the commission in charge concluded its investigative work, drafting a historical report and placing the Federation in a position to settle the dispute.

== See also ==
- 1926–27 Divisione Nazionale
- Leandro Arpinati
- Luigi Allemandi
- History of Bologna FC 1909

== Bibliography ==
- Bacci, Gino (2006). Storia del calcio italiano [History of italian soccer] (in Italian). Milan: Gruppo Editoriale Armenia. ISBN 88-8113-350-4.
- Brera, Gianni (1975). Storia critica del calcio italiano [Critical history of Italian soccer] (in Italian). Milan: Bompiani. ISBN 9788880895442.
- Chiesa, Carlo Felice (2012). La Grande storia del calcio italiano (pubblicata a puntate da Guerin Sportivo) [The Great History of Italian Football (published serially by Guerin Sportivo)] (in Italian). Bologna: Conti Editore.
- Chiesa, Carlo Felice (2017). Bologna: storia di un'ingiustizia. 1926-27: lo scudetto negato [Bologna: history of an injustice. 1926-27: the scudetto denied] (in Italian). Bologna: Minerva Edizioni. ISBN 9788873819547.
- Grimaldi, Mauro (1999). Leandro Arpinati. Un anarchico alla corte di Mussolini [Leandro Arpinati. An anarchist in Mussolini's court.] (in Italian). Roma: La Stampa Sportiva. ISBN 8883130227.
- Lunardelli, Massimo (2014). Indagine sullo scudetto revocato al Torino nel 1927 [Investigation into the scudetto revoked from Torino in 1927] (in Italian). Torino: Blu Edizioni. ISBN 978-88-7904-175-1.
