= Bernardo Perin =

Italian footballer (1897-1964)

Personal information
- Full name: Bernardo Perin
- Date of birth: 5 December 1897
- Place of birth: Arcugnano, Italy
- Date of death: 18 April 1964 (aged 66)
- Place of death: Bologna, Italy
- Position: Midfielder

Senior career*
Years	Team	Apps	(Gls)
1912–1914	Vicenza	27	(17)
1914–1915	Modena	4	(0)
1918–1919	Internazionale	?	(?)
1918–1930	Bologna	203	(72)

International career
1921–1923	Italy	4	(0)
- * Club domestic league appearances and goals

Bernardo Perin (Italian pronunciation: [berˈnardo peˈrin]; 5 December 1897 – 18 April 1964) was an Italian footballer who played as a midfielder. He represented the Italy national football team four times, the first being on 6 March 1921, the occasion of a friendly match against Switzerland in a 2–1 home win.

== Honours ==
=== Player ===
Bologna

- Italian Football Championship: 1924–25, 1928–29
