= Alberto Pozzi =

Italian footballer (1902-1966)

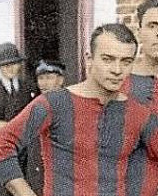

Personal information
- Full name: Alberto Pozzi
- Date of birth: 21 November 1902
- Place of birth: Bologna, Italy
- Date of death: 1966 (aged 63–64)
- Place of death: Bologna, Italy
- Position: Forward

Senior career*
Years	Team	Apps	(Gls)
1920–1929	Bologna	204	(46)

International career
1922–1924	Italy	3	(0)
- * Club domestic league appearances and goals

Alberto Pozzi (Italian pronunciation: [alˈbɛrto ˈpottsi]; 21 November 1902 – 1966) was an Italian footballer who played as a forward. He represented the Italy national football team three times, the first being on 3 December 1922, the occasion of a friendly match against Switzerland in a 2–2 home draw.

== Honours ==
=== Player ===
Bologna

- Italian Football Championship: 1924–25, 1928–29
