= Renato Dall'Ara =

Italian entrepreneur

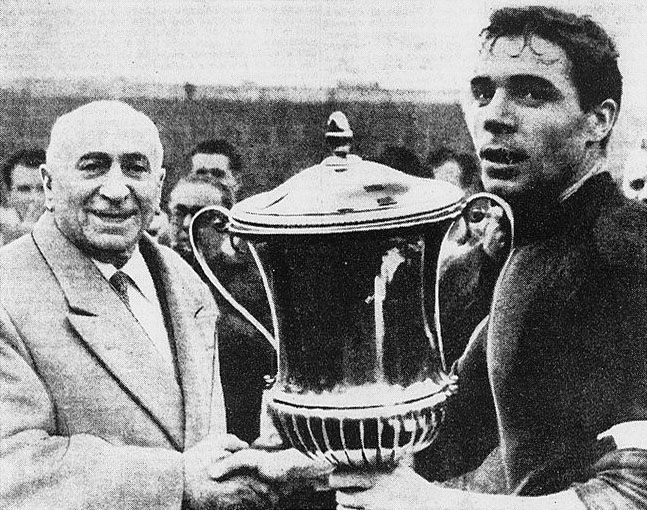
President Renato Dall'Ara (left) and captain Mirko Pavinato (right) with the trophy of the 1961 Mitropa Cup.

Renato Dall'Ara (10 October 1892 in Reggio Emilia – 3 June 1964 in Milan) was an Italian entrepreneur, sports manager, and chairman of Bologna for thirty years.

== Biography ==
An entrepreneur of modest origins, Dall'Ara went from his native Reggio Emilia to Bologna, starting a thriving knitwear company that made him wealthy. In 1934, he was appointed as president of football club Bologna.

During the first years of his presidency, between 1934 and 1941, the team (led until 1938 by the Hungarian coach Árpád Weisz) won four league titles and the Coupe des Nations in Paris in 1937 (it). In the postwar years, Dall'Ara was unable for many years to repeat the previous successes, until the beginning of the 1960s, when Bologna won the Mitropa Cup in 1961 (it).

In the 1963–64 Serie A, Bologna and Inter Milan were about to play the Championship tie-breaker on 7 June 1964; however, four days before the match, on 3 June, Dall'Ara died in Milan from a heart attack while he was in the Lega Calcio headquarters for a meeting with Angelo Moratti in preparation for that match.

Dall'Ara was buried in the Certosa di Bologna along with his wife. The stadium of Bologna, Stadio Renato Dall'Ara, was named after him. He was added to the Italian Football Hall of Fame in 2017.
