= Giuseppe Della Valle =

Italian footballer

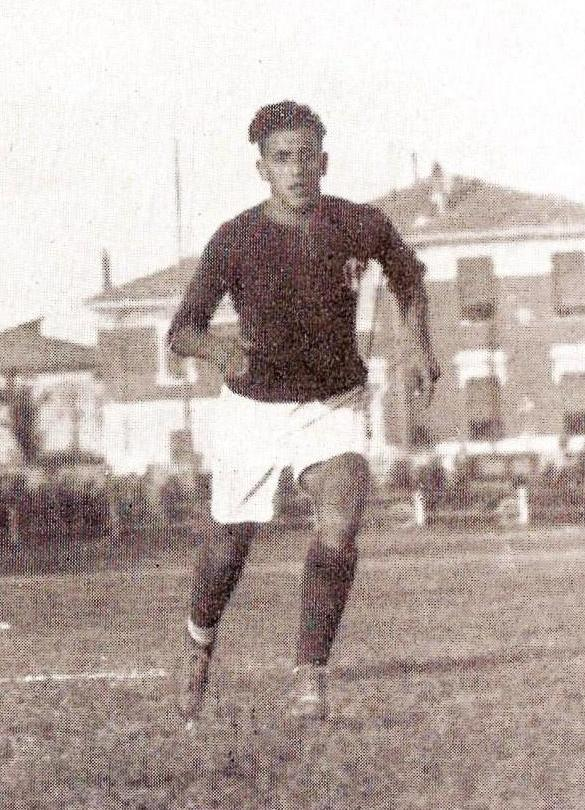
- Della Valle with Bologna in 1925

Personal information
- Date of birth: 25 November 1899
- Place of birth: Bologna, Kingdom of Italy
- Date of death: November 26, 1975 (aged 76)
- Position: Forward

Senior career*
| Years | Team | Apps | (Gls) |
| 1916–1931 | Bologna | 208 | (104) |

International career
| 1923–1929 | Italy | 17 | (6) |
- * Club domestic league appearances and goals

Giuseppe Della Valle (Italian pronunciation: [dʒuˈzɛppe della ˈvalle]; 25 November 1899 – 26 November 1975) was an Italian football player who featured in the Italy national team as a striker. He represented Italy at the 1924 Summer Olympics, where he scored twice.

== Honours ==
Bologna

- Italian Prima Divisione Northern League (2): 1924–25, 1928–29
