= Hermann Felsner =

Austrian football manager (1889–1977)

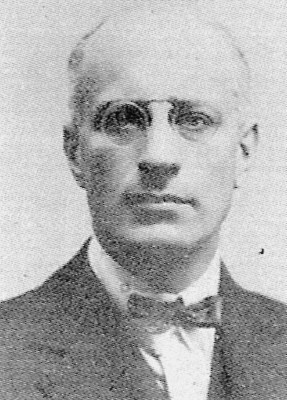
- Felsner in 1920

Personal information
- Date of birth: 1 April 1889
- Place of birth: Vienna, Austria-Hungary
- Date of death: 6 February 1977 (aged 87)
- Place of death: Graz, Austria
- Position: Midfielder

Senior career*
Years	Team	Apps	(Gls)
- Wiener Sportclub

Managerial career
- 1920–1931: Bologna
- 1930–1933: Fiorentina
- 1933–1936: Sampierdarenese
- 1936–1937: Genoa
- 1937–1938: Milan
- 1938–1942: Bologna
- 1947–1948: Bologna (technical director)
- 1948–1950: Livorno
- * Club domestic league appearances and goals

Hermann Felsner (1 April 1889 – 6 February 1977) also known as Ermanno Fellsner, was an Austrian football player and manager.

== Playing career ==
Born in Vienna, Felsner competed with the Wiener Sportclub, before moving to Italy to play for and manage many clubs.

== Managerial career ==
Although he managed several clubs, Hermann is most remembered for his time at Bologna where he spent over a decade and led the club to four Italian League titles. In the club's entire history they have won seven scudetti, making Felsner their most successful manager.

He also won the Coppa Italia once, with Genoa in 1937.

== Honours ==
=== Managerial ===
- Italian Football Championship: 1925, 1929
- Serie A: 1939, 1941
- Coppa Italia: 1937
