= Rodolfo Ostromann =

Austrian footballer (1903–1960)

Personal information
- Full name: Rodolfo Ostromann
- Date of birth: 22 December 1903
- Place of birth: Pula, Austria-Hungary
- Date of death: 5 September 1960 (aged 56)
- Place of death: Pula, Yugoslavia
- Position: Striker

Youth career
- Giovanni Grion

Senior career*
Years	Team	Apps	(Gls)
1921–1924	Edera Pula		
1924–1928	Milan	72	(33)
1928–1930	Triestina	64	(23)
1930–1931	Legnano	29	(3)
1931–1932	Cagliari	34	(11)
1935–1935	Giovanni Grion		
- * Club domestic league appearances and goals

Rodolfo Ostromann (22 December 1903 – 5 September 1960) was an Austrian professional footballer, who played as a striker.
