= Stadio Sterlino =

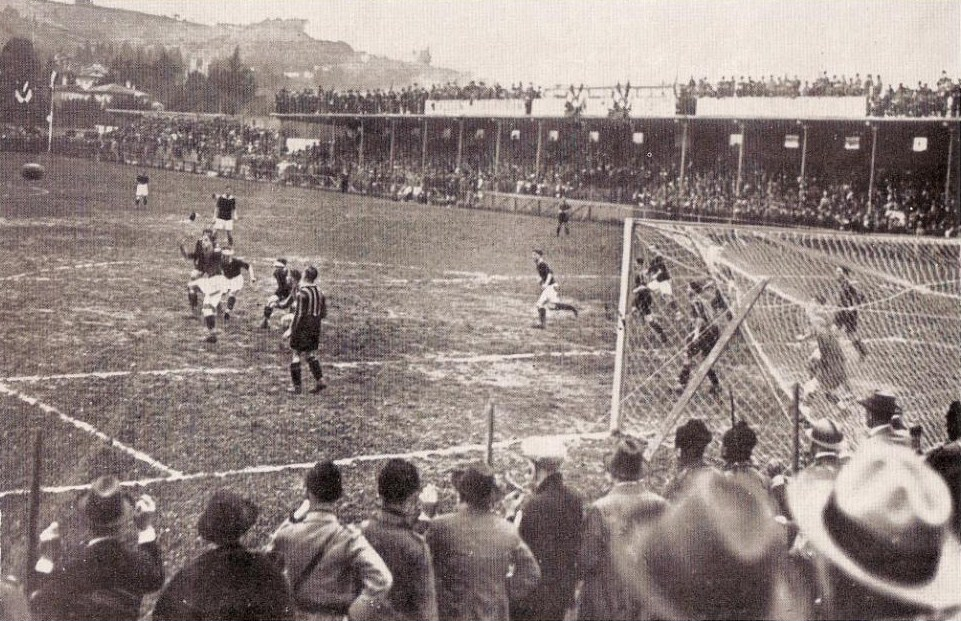
- The Sterlino, c. 1927
- Interactive map of Stadio Sterlino
- Full name: Stadio Sterlino
- Location: Bologna, Italy
- Owner: Bologna F.C. 1909
- Operator: Bologna F.C. 1909
- Capacity: 15,000

Construction
- Opened: 1913
- Closed: 1927
- Demolished: 1969

Tenant
- Bologna F.C. 1909

Stadio Sterlino was a multi-use stadium in Bologna, Italy. It was initially used as the stadium of Bologna F.C. 1909 matches. It was replaced by Stadio Renato Dall'Ara in 1927. The capacity of the stadium was 15,000 spectators.
