= Johannes Felsner =

Austrian footballer

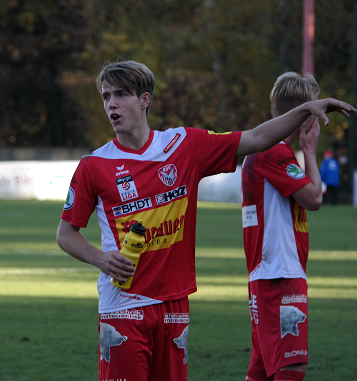
- Felsner with Kapfenberger SV in 2016

Personal information
- Date of birth: 10 October 1998 (age 28)
- Place of birth: Schladming, Austria
- Height: 1.80 m (5 ft 11 in)
- Position: Defender

Team information
- Current team: FC Schladming

Youth career
- 2002–2009: SV Union Haus im Ennstal
- 2009–2012: FC Schladming
- 2012–2014: Kapfenberger SV

Senior career*
Years	Team	Apps	(Gls)
2014–2016	Kapfenberger SV II		
2016–2020	Kapfenberger SV	4	(0)
2020	ASV Bad Mitterndorf		
2020–	FC Schladming		
- * Club domestic league appearances and goals as of 19 April 2019

Johannes Felsner (born 10 October 1998) is an Austrian football player. He plays for FC Schladming.

== Club career ==
He made his Austrian Football First League debut for Kapfenberger SV on 14 March 2017 in a game against FC Liefering.
