= Leandro Arpinati =

Italian politician (1892–1945)

Leandro Arpinati (29 February 1892 – 22 April 1945) was an Italian politician.

== Biography ==
Arpinati was born at Civitella di Romagna. Before World War I, he was originally an individualist-anarchist and, together with his friend Benito Mussolini, collaborated on the socialist newspaper La lotta di classe. He was a fervid interventionist as early as August 1914. In those years he moved to Bologna, where he worked on the Italian railroad. In early 1920 he founded the second Fascio di combattimento in the city.

On 21 November 1920 he was amongst the leaders of the squads which took part in the fighting between Fascists and Socialists in Piazza Nettuno and Piazza Maggiore in Bologna (the so-called strage of Palazzo d'Accursio). The following year he was elected to the Chamber of Deputies and, after the March on Rome, he was made national vice-secretary of the Partito Nazionale Fascista (PNF). In 1926 he became podestà of Bologna, a position which he left in 1929 to become Undersecretary of the Ministry of Interior. Arpinati held several positions in the Italian sports world, such as the President of the Italian National Olympic Committee (CONI) and of the Federazione Italiana Giuoco Calcio (Italian football federation): he led the reformation of the Serie A championship on national level, and organized the 1934 FIFA World Cup. In 1926 he intervened to strip FC Torino of the national football title after a corruption scandal; as the Bologna team had arrived second behind Torino, Arpinati, being a Bolognese, decided to leave the title unassigned (a feat unparalleled until the 2006 Calciopoli) to avoid accusations of personal interest.

In 1930 the PNF secretary Achille Starace accused Arpinati of being behind the attempt against Mussolini in the Bologna Stadium carried out on 31 October 1926. He was therefore charged as enemy of the regime, and confined first in Lipari (1934–1937) and then to home detention near Bologna.

In 1943 Arpinati refused a personal invitation by Mussolini to join the Repubblica di Salò, the German puppet-state created in northern Italy after the Allied conquest of the southern peninsula. He also helped various member of the CLNAI.

He was executed on 22 April 1945 at Argelato, one day after the Allied liberation of Bologna, by a group of communist partisans.
