= 1924–25 Prima Divisione =

24th season of top-tier Italian football

Prima Divisione
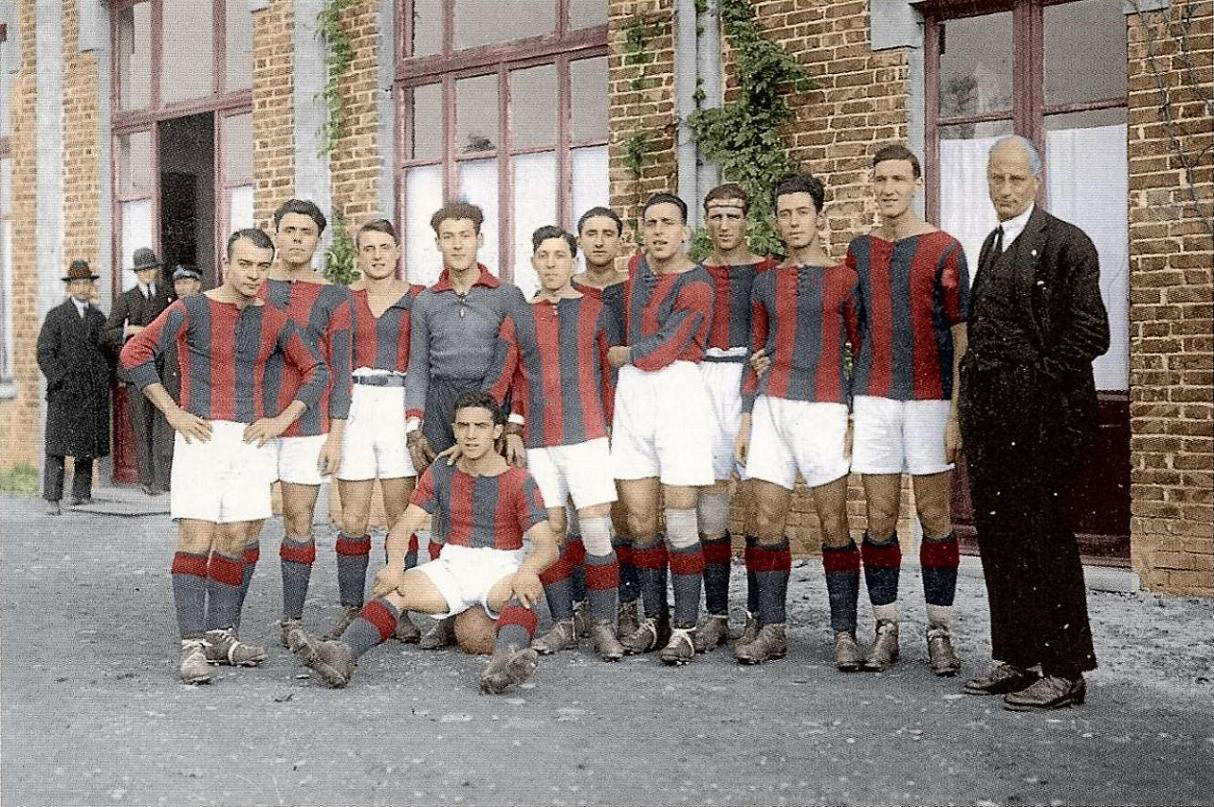
- 1924–25 Bologna team
- Season: 1924–25
- Champions: Bologna; 1st title
- Relegated: Spezia; Derthona; SPAL; US Tarantina; FBC Bari
- Top goalscorer: Mario Magnozzi (19 goals)

The 1924-25 Prima Divisione was the twenty-fifth edition of the Italian Football Championship and the fourth branded Prima Divisione. This season was the second from which the Italian Football Champions celebrations included adorning the team jerseys in the subsequent season with a Scudetto. The 1924–25 Prima Divisione was the first Italian Football Championship won by Bologna.

== Format ==
All five seasons of Prima Divisione were scheduled as regional competitions, leading to a national final.

== Northern League ==
=== Regular season ===
Derthona and Reggiana had been promoted from the Second Division. AC Mantova was added as guest after a referees scandal they had suffered.

==== Group A ====
===== Classification =====
P	Team	Pld	W	D	L	GF	GA	GD	Pts	Promotion or relegation
1.	Genoa	22	13	4	5	48	23	+25	30	Qualified
2.	Modena	22	13	3	6	41	24	+17	29	
3.	Casale	22	12	3	7	37	30	+7	27	
4.	Internazionale	22	12	1	9	44	37	+7	25	
4.	Pisa	22	11	3	8	32	28	+4	25	
6.	Torino	22	9	6	7	30	25	+5	24	
7.	Cremonese	22	9	4	9	28	34	-6	22	
8.	Reggiana	22	9	2	11	36	42	-6	20	
9.	Hellas Verona	22	6	6	10	33	42	-9	18	
10.	Brescia	22	7	3	12	27	34	-7	17	
11.	Legnano	22	5	5	12	18	29	-11	15	Qualification play-off
12.	Spezia	22	4	4	14	20	46	-26	12	Relegated

===== Results table =====
Home \ Away	BRE	CAS	CRE	GEN	HEL	INT	LEG	MOD	PIS	REG	SPE	TOR
Brescia	—	3–1	5–0	0–2	4–0	1–0	1–0	4–1	0–1	1–1	4–2	1–2
Casale	2–1	—	3–0	2–1	2–0	2–1	1–0	4–0	3–1	2–0	6–3	0–0
Cremonese	3–0	2–1	—	2–0	2–2	1–1	3–0	1–0	1–0	1–1	6–0	0–1
Genoa	5–0	4–1	4–0	—	3–0	2–1	6–3	2–0	1–1	4–2	3–2	0–0
Hellas Verona	2–0	2–1	1–2	2–2	—	2–3	2–1	3–3	3–0	3–0	3–0	2–2
Internazionale	1–0	4–0	4–2	2–1	3–1	—	1–2	4–1	1–2	3–0	5–2	2–5
Legnano	0–0	0–1	0–1	1–0	1–1	0–2	—	0–0	0–0	2–0	1–1	4–1
Modena	2–0	3–0	3–0	1–0	1–0	5–0	3–1	—	4–0	2–1	2–0	0–1
Pisa	6–1	2–2	3–0	1–2	2–0	3–1	1–0	0–1	—	2–0	3–2	1–0
Reggiana	2–1	1–0	4–1	1–4	6–2	4–2	3–1	1–4	3–1	—	2–0	2–1
Spezia	1–0	1–1	0–0	0–1	1–1	0–1	1–0	0–3	0–1	2–1	—	1–0
Torino	0–0	1–2	1–0	1–1	3–1	1–2	0–1	2–2	3–1	3–1	2–1	—

Legend: Blue = home team win; Yellow = draw; Red = away team win.

==== Group B ====
===== Classification =====
P	Team	Pld	W	D	L	GF	GA	GD	Pts	Promotion or relegation
1.	Bologna	24	15	4	5	53	22	+31	34	Qualified
2.	Pro Vercelli	24	13	6	5	56	29	+27	32	
2.	Juventus	24	12	8	4	38	21	+17	32	
4.	Padova	24	12	5	7	51	34	+17	29	
5.	Livorno	24	9	7	8	45	41	+4	25	
5.	Alessandria	24	8	9	7	27	30	-3	25	
7.	Novara	24	6	10	8	26	30	-4	22	
8.	Milan	24	10	1	13	45	51	-6	21	
8.	Andrea Doria	24	9	3	12	26	33	-7	21	
10.	Sampierdarenese	24	7	6	11	24	32	-8	20	
11.	Mantova	24	8	3	13	38	53	-15	19	Tie-breaker
12.	SPAL	24	7	5	12	26	50	-24	19	Relegated
13.	Derthona	24	4	5	15	25	54	-29	13	Relegated

===== Results table =====
Home \ Away	ALE	ADO	BOL	DER	JUV	LIV	MAN	MIL	NOV	PAD	PRO	SAM	SPA
Alessandria	—	2–1	1–0	0–0	2–2	2–3	6–1	3–1	1–0	1–1	1–0	1–0	2–1
Andrea Doria	0–0	—	0–1	4–1	0–0	1–0	3–1	3–2	2–0	4–0	1–1	2–1	1–0
Bologna	3–1	5–0	—	4–1	2–1	2–1	5–0	2–0	0–0	3–0	3–0	4–0	3–1
Derthona	1–1	0–3	2–4	—	0–2	2–1	3–0	0–3	1–1	2–0	1–1	1–0	0–2
Juventus	3–0	1–0	2–1	2–1	—	2–0	3–0	5–3	1–1	0–2	0–0	4–1	2–1
Livorno	1–1	2–0	6–2	2–2	2–2	—	4–1	4–0	1–1	2–0	4–1	2–1	4–0
Mantova	1–1	1–0	0–0	5–1	0–1	4–0	—	4–2	0–1	2–1	4–2	1–1	4–0
Milan	3–0	2–0	3–1	3–2	0–0	4–2	2–1	—	3–1	1–3	1–2	2–0	3–1
Novara	0–0	1–0	1–2	2–1	1–1	1–1	3–1	4–2	—	1–1	1–1	0–2	4–1
Padova	4–0	6–1	3–2	2–1	2–1	5–1	1–2	4–0	1–1	—	0–0	2–0	9–0
Pro Vercelli	2–0	2–0	3–0	5–0	2–1	6–1	5–3	3–2	5–1	6–0	—	2–0	5–0
Sampierdarenese	1–0	2–0	0–0	1–0	0–0	1–1	4–1	3–2	1–0	2–3	2–2	—	0–0
SPAL	1–1	2–0	0–4	2–2	0–2	0–0	4–1	3–1	1–0	1–1	3–0	2–1	—

Legend: Blue = home team win; Yellow = draw; Red = away team win.

===== Tie-breaker =====
Played on August 30, 1925, in Milan.

Team 1	Score	Team 2
Mantova	3-1	SPAL

Spal relegated to the second division, while Mantova qualified to the qualification play-off.

Legnano, Mantova, Novese and Como were enlisted to participate in the qualification round, but Novese and Como retired, letting Legnano and Mantova to maintain their places in the Italian First Division.

=== Finals ===
Team 1	Agg.	Team 2	1st leg	2nd leg
Bologna	● 2 points each ●	Genoa	1-2	2-1

Because of the sole points were considered by the championship regulations, with no relevance to the aggregation of goals, a tie-break was needed.

Tie-breakers

Team 1	Score	Team 2
Bologna	2-2 (annulled)	Genoa
Bologna	1-1	Genoa
Bologna	2-0	Genoa

Bologna qualified for the National Finals.

== Southern League ==
The Southern League was a separate amatorial league, still divided in five regions. The winner were Alba Rome.

== National Finals ==
- 1st leg: 16 Aug 1925, *2nd leg: 23 Aug 1925

Team 1	Agg.	Team 2	1st leg	2nd leg
Bologna	6-0	Alba Roma	4-0	2-0

== Top goalscorers ==
Rank	Player	Club	Goals
1	(Italy) Mario Magnozzi	Livorno	19
2	(Austria) Rodolfo Ostromann	Milan	18
3	(Italy) Giuseppe Della Valle	Bologna	17
4	(Italy) Angelo Schiavio	Bologna	16
4	(Italy) Fulvio Bernardini	Lazio	16

== References and sources ==
- Almanacco Illustrato del Calcio - La Storia 1898-2004, Panini Edizioni, Modena, September 2005
- Hussain Pakzad Bologna Football Club 1924-1925
