= 1964–65 Bologna FC 1909 season =

Bologna Football Club
1964-65 season
- President: Luigi Goldoni
- Manager: Fulvio Bernardini
- Stadium: Comunale
- Serie A: 6th
- Coppa Italia: Quarterfinals
- European Cup: First round
- Top goalscorer: League: Nielsen (13); All: Nielsen (14)
| Home colours | Away colours |

During 1964–65 season Bologna F.C. competed in Serie A, Coppa Italia and European Cup.

== Summary ==
The team finished the League in 6th place with 34 points, in a 1964–65 season which saw Inter winning the title with 54 points. The club made its debut in the European Cup against Anderlecht in the first round and after three matches is eliminated by a coin toss. In Coppa Italia the squad is qualified to the quarterfinals only to be defeated by Juventus after a penalty series.

== Squad ==
Note: Flags indicate national team as defined under FIFA eligibility rules; some limited exceptions apply. Players may hold more than one non-FIFA nationality.

| Pos. | Nation | Player |
|---|---|---|
| GK | ITA | William Negri |
| GK | ITA | Giuseppe Spalazzi |
| GK | ITA | Rino Rado |
| DF | ITA | Carlo Furlanis |
| DF | ITA | Mirko Pavinato |
| DF | ITA | Francesco Janich |
| DF | ITA | Manlio Muccini |
| DF | ITA | Faustino Turra |
| DF | ITA | Bruno Capra |
| DF | ITA | Tazio Roversi |
| MF | ITA | Romano Fogli |

| Pos. | Nation | Player |
|---|---|---|
| MF | FRG | Helmut Haller |
| MF | ITA | Giacomo Bulgarelli |
| MF | ITA | Paride Tumburus |
| MF | ITA | Marcello Tentorio |
| MF | ITA | Mario Fara |
| FW | DEN | Harald Nielsen |
| FW | ITA | Ezio Pascutti |
| FW | ITA | Marino Perani |
| FW | ITA | Mario Maraschi |
| FW | ITA | Gianni Bui |
| FW | ITA | Sidio Corradi |

=== Transfers ===
In
| Pos. | Name | from | Type |
|---|---|---|---|
| FW | Mario Maraschi | SS Lazio | |
| FW | Gianni Bui | SPAL | |
| MF | Mario Fara | Alessandria | |
| DF | Faustino Turra | Catania | |
| DF | Manlio Muccini | SPAL | |

Out
| Pos. | Name | To | Type |
|---|---|---|---|
| FW | Antonio Renna | SS Lazio | |
| FW | Héctor Demarco | Lanerossi Vicenza | |
| MF | Bruno Franzini | Sampdoria | |
| MF | Edmondo Lorenzini | Catanzaro | |

== Competitions ==
=== Serie A ===
==== League table ====
| Pos | Team | Pld | W | D | L | GF | GA | GD | Pts | Qualification or relegation |
|---|---|---|---|---|---|---|---|---|---|---|
| 4 | Fiorentina | 34 | 16 | 9 | 9 | 52 | 37 | +15 | 41 | Chosen for Inter-Cities Fairs Cup |
| 4 | Juventus | 34 | 15 | 11 | 8 | 43 | 24 | +19 | 41 | Qualification to Cup Winners' Cup |
| 6 | Bologna | 34 | 11 | 12 | 11 | 43 | 42 | +1 | 34 | |
| 6 | Cagliari | 34 | 13 | 8 | 13 | 33 | 35 | −2 | 34 | |
| 8 | Catania | 34 | 12 | 8 | 14 | 46 | 51 | −5 | 32 | |

Source: Panini

==== Results by round ====
| Round | 1 | 2 | 3 | 4 | 5 | 6 | 7 | 8 | 9 | 10 | 11 | 12 | 13 | 14 | 15 | 16 | 17 | 18 | 19 | 20 | 21 | 22 | 23 | 24 | 25 | 26 | 27 | 28 | 29 | 30 | 31 | 32 | 33 | 34 |
|---|---|---|---|---|---|---|---|---|---|---|---|---|---|---|---|---|---|---|---|---|---|---|---|---|---|---|---|---|---|---|---|---|---|---|
| Ground | A | H | A | H | H | A | H | A | A | H | A | H | A | H | H | A | H | H | A | H | A | A | H | A | H | H | A | H | A | H | A | A | H | A |
| Result | L | W | D | W | L | L | W | D | L | D | W | W | L | W | W | D | W | D | D | W | D | D | D | D | L | W | L | W | D | L | D | L | L | L |
| Position | 14 | 7 | 7 | 5 | 7 | 10 | 9 | 9 | 11 | 13 | 8 | 7 | 8 | 6 | 6 | 6 | 5 | 6 | 6 | 6 | 5 | 6 | 6 | 6 | 6 | 6 | 6 | 6 | 6 | 6 | 6 | 6 | 6 | 6 |

Source: Competitive matches
A = Away; H = Home; W = Win; D = Draw; L = Loss; = Leader, 1965-66 European Cup; = 1965–66 Inter-Cities Fairs Cup; = 1965–66 Serie B

==== Matches ====
| 13 September 1964 1 | Atalanta | 2 – 0 | Bologna | Bergamo |
| | Mereghetti 26'; Nova 50' | | | Stadium: Stadio Atleti Azzurri d'Italia; Referee: Angonese |

| 20 September 1964 2 | Bologna | 3 – 0 | Lanerossi Vicenza | Bologna |
| | Bulgarelli 51 ' Pascutti 60 ' Nielsen 70 ' | | | Stadium: Stadio Renato Dall'Ara; Referee: Rancher |

| 27 September 1964 3 | Genoa CFC | 0 – 0 | Bologna | Genova |
| | | | | Stadium: Stadio Luigi Ferraris; Referee: Lo Bello |

| 4 October 1964 4 | Bologna | 3 – 0 | Messina | Bologna |
| | Turra 17 ' Haller 30 ' Nielsen 55 ' | | | Stadium: Stadio Renato Dall'Ara; Referee: Politano |

| 11 October 1964 5 | Bologna | 0 – 1 | Sampdoria | Bologna |
| | | | 26' Barison | Stadium: Stadio Renato Dall'Ara; Referee: D'Agostini |

| 18 October 1964 6 | Juventus | 1 – 0 | Bologna | Turin |
| | Bercellino 22 ' | | | Stadium: Comunale; Referee: Francescon |

| 25 October 1964 7 | Bologna | 2 – 0 | SS Lazio | Bologna |
| | Haller 37' (pen.), 71' | | | Stadium: Stadio Renato Dall'Ara; Referee: Di Tonno |

| 8 November 1964 8 | AS Roma | 1 – 1 | Bologna | Rome |
| | Nicolè 70' | | 15' Haller | Stadium: Olimpico; Referee: De Marchi |

| 15 November 1964 9 | Fiorentina | 2 – 1 | Bologna | Florence |
| | Pirovano 6'; Maschio 27' | | 19' Maraschi | Stadium: Comunale; Referee: Angonese |

| 22 November 1964 10 | Bologna | 0 – 0 | Inter | Bologna |
| | | | | Stadium: Renato Dall'Ara; Referee: De Marchi |

| 29 November 1964 11 | Mantova | 0 – 1 | Bologna | Mantua |
| | | | 45' Pascutti | Stadium: Stadio Danilo Martelli; Referee: Lo Bello |

| 13 December 1964 12 | Bologna | 4 – 2 | Foggia & Incedit | Bologna |
| | Perani 18 ' Haller 36', 78' (pen.); Nielsen 46' | | 35' Favalli; 42'Nocera | Stadium: Renato Dall'Ara; Referee: Righetti |

| 20 December 1964 13 | Milan | 3 – 1 | Bologna | Milan |
| | Rivera 8'; Amarildo 56'; Lodetti 90' | | 68' (pen.) Haller | Stadium: San Siro; Referee: Francescon |

| 27 December 1964 14 | Bologna | 3 – 0 | Varese | Bologna |
| | Nielsen 26'; Haller 69'; Bulgarelli 76' | | | Stadium: Stadio Renato Dall'Ara; Referee: Bernardis |

| 3 January 1965 15 | Bologna | 1 – 0 | Torino | Bologna |
| | Nielsen 87' | | | Stadium: Stadio Renato Dall'Ara; Referee: Rigato |

| 10 January 1965 16 | Cagliari | 0 – 0 | Bologna | Cagliari |
| | | | | Stadium: Stadio Amsicora; Referee: D'Agostini |

| 17 January 1965 17 | Bologna | 3 – 0 | Catania | Bologna |
| | Nielsen 2', 60'; Bulgarelli 41' | | | Stadium: Comunale; Referee: Pieroni |

| 24 January 1965 18 | Bologna | 1 – 1 | Atalanta | Bologna |
| | Nielsen 75' | | 85' Petroni | Stadium: Comunale; Referee: Genel |

| 31 January 1965 19 | Lanerossi Vicenza | 1 – 1 | Bologna | Vicenza |
| | Fontana 29' | | 85' Pascutti | Stadium: Stadio Romeo Menti; Referee: Monti |

| 7 February 1965 20 | Bologna | 2 – 1 | Genoa CFC | Bologna |
| | Turra 30'; Pascutti 44' | | 33' Bicicli | Stadium: Stadio Renato Dall'Ara; Referee: Campanati |

| 14 February 1965 21 | Messina | 3 – 3 | Bologna | Messina |
| | Schutz 24 ', 89 ' Morelli 51 ' | | 22' Pascutti; 26'Tumburus; 83'Nielsen | Stadium: Stadio San Filippo; Referee: Angonese |

| 21 February 1965 22 | Sampdoria | 0 – 0 | Bologna | Genoa |
| | | | | Stadium: Stadio Luigi Ferraris; Referee: Genel |

| 28 February 1965 23 | Bologna | 1 – 1 | Juventus | Bologna |
| | Bulgarelli 2' | | 9' Stacchini | Stadium: Comunale; Referee: Sbardella |

| 7 March 1965 24 | SS Lazio | 1 – 1 | Bologna | Rome |
| | Mari 89' | | 38' Pascutti | Stadium: Olimpico; Referee: Righetti |

| 21 March 1965 25 | Bologna | 1 – 2 | AS Roma | Bologna |
| | Haller 80' | | 31 'Tamborini; 39' Nicolè | Stadium: Comunale; Referee: Angonese |

| 28 March 1965 26 | Bologna | 3 – 1 | Fiorentina | Bologna |
| | Nielsen 55', 72'; Tumburus 89' | | 59' Hamrin | Stadium: Comunale; Referee: Bernardis |

| 4 April 1965 27 | Inter | 2 – 0 | Bologna | Milan |
| | Corso 44 ' Bedin 68 ' | | | Stadium: San Siro; Referee: Francescon |

| 11 April 1965 28 | Bologna | 4 – 1 | Mantua | Bologna |
| | Perani 57 ' Haller 81' (pen.); Nielsen 84', 88' | | 53' Ciccolo | Stadium: Comunale; Referee: Pieroni |

| 25 April 1965 29 | Foggia & Incedit | 2 – 2 | Bologna | Foggia |
| | Furlanis 24' (o.g.); Nocera 36' | | 8' Pascutti; 67' Bulgarelli | Stadium: Pino Zaccheria; Referee: Monti |

| 9 May 1965 30 | Bologna | 0 – 2 | Milan | Bologna |
| | | | 33', 79' Ferrario | Stadium: Stadio Renato Dall'Ara; Referee: Lo Bello |

| 16 May 1965 31 | Varese | 0 – 0 | Bologna | Varese |
| | | | | Stadium: Stadio Franco Ossola; Referee: Genel |

| 23 May 1965 32 | Torino | 5 – 0 | Bologna | Turin |
| | Hitchens 11 ' Simoni 34 ', 71 ' Hitchens 73 ' Meroni 75' | | | Stadium: Comunale; Referee: Campanati |

| 30 May 1965 33 | Bologna | 1 – 3 | Cagliari | Bologna |
| | Haller 57' | | 54' Nenè; 73' Rizzo; 79' Nenè | Stadium: Stadio Renato Dall'Ara; Referee: Marchiori |

| 6 June 1965 34 | Catania | 4 – 0 | Bologna | Catania |
| | | | 5 ' Danova; 40 ', 55 ' Calvanese; 82 ' Facchin | Stadium: Stadio Cibali; Referee: Di Tonno |

=== Coppa Italia ===
Torino, Bologna, Inter and AS Roma joined the competition in this round.

==== Quarterfinals ====
| 5 May 1965 | Bologna | 0 – 0 (a.e.t.) (3 – 4 p) | Juventus | Bologna |
| 21:15 CET | | | | Stadium: Comunale; Referee: De Marchi |
| | Penalties |
| | Perani (penalty missed) Perani; Perani; Perani (penalty missed); Perani Perani (penalty missed) | | (penalty missed) Combin; (penalty missed) Stacchini; Menichelli; Menichelli; Sarti Sarti |

=== European Cup ===
==== First round ====
| 9 September 1964 1 | RSC Anderlecht (Belgium) | 1 – 0 | (Italy) Bologna | Anderlecht |
| | Van Himst 49' | | | Stadium: Émile Verséstadion; Referee: (West Germany) Kreitlein |

| 7 October 1964 2 | Bologna (Italy) | 2 – 1 | (Belgium) Anderlecht | Bologna |
| | Pascutti 57'; Nielsen 75' | | 89' Stockman | Stadium: Comunale; Referee: (Hungary) Horvath |

| 14 October 1964 replay | Anderlecht (Belgium) | 0 – 0 | Bologna | Barcelona |
| | | | | Stadium: Camp Nou; Referee: (Spain) Zariquiegui |

RSC Anderlecht advanced to the Second round after a coin toss.

== Statistics ==
=== Players statistics ===
| No. | Pos | Nat | Player | Total | | 1964-65 Serie A | | Coppa | | European Cup | |
| No. | Pos | Nat | Player | Apps | Goals | Apps | Goals | Apps | Goals | Apps | Goals |
|---|---|---|---|---|---|---|---|---|---|---|---|
| | GK | (Italy) ITA | William Negri | 29 | -31 | 25 | -29 | 1 | -0 | 3 | -2 |
| | DF | (Italy) ITA | Carlo Furlanis | 37 | 1 | 33 | 1 | 1 | 0 | 3 | 0 |
| | DF | (Italy) ITA | Mirko Pavinato | 35 | 0 | 31 | 0 | 1 | 0 | 3 | 0 |
| | DF | (Italy) ITA | Francesco Janich | 33 | 0 | 29 | 0 | 1 | 0 | 3 | 0 |
| | MF | (Italy) ITA | Romano Fogli | 34 | 0 | 30 | 0 | 1 | 0 | 3 | 0 |
| | MF | (West Germany) FRG | Helmut Haller | 33 | 11 | 30 | 11 | 0 | 0 | 3 | 0 |
| | MF | (Italy) ITA | Giacomo Bulgarelli | 33 | 5 | 29 | 5 | 1 | 0 | 3 | 0 |
| | MF | (Italy) ITA | Paride Tumburus | 26 | 2 | 23 | 2 | 0 | 0 | 3 | 0 |
| | FW | (Denmark) DEN | Harald Nielsen | 35 | 14 | 31 | 13 | 1 | 0 | 3 | 1 |
| | FW | (Italy) ITA | Ezio Pascutti | 29 | 8 | 26 | 7 | 0 | 0 | 3 | 1 |
| | FW | (Italy) ITA | Marino Perani | 26 | 2 | 22 | 2 | 1 | 0 | 3 | 0 |
| | GK | (Italy) ITA | Rino Rado | 8 | -8 | 8 | -8 | | | | |
| | FW | (Italy) ITA | Mario Maraschi | 18 | 1 | 17 | 1 | 1 | 0 | | |
| | DF | (Italy) ITA | Manlio Muccini | 17 | 0 | 16 | 0 | 1 | 0 | | |
| | DF | (Italy) ITA | Faustino Turra | 8 | 2 | 8 | 2 | | | | |
| | MF | (Italy) ITA | Marcello Tentorio | 5 | 0 | 5 | 0 | | | | |
| | FW | (Italy) ITA | Gianni Bui | 3 | 0 | 3 | 0 | | | | |
| | DF | (Italy) ITA | Bruno Capra | 3 | 0 | 3 | 0 | | | | |
| | FW | (Italy) ITA | Sidio Corradi | 2 | 0 | 2 | 0 | | | | |
| | MF | (Italy) ITA | Mario Fara | 2 | 0 | 1 | 0 | 1 | 0 | | |
| | DF | (Italy) ITA | Tazio Roversi | 1 | 0 | 1 | 0 | | | | |
| | GK | (Italy) ITA | Giuseppe Spalazzi | 1 | -5 | 1 | -5 | | | | |

- Source: http://calcio-seriea.net/presenze/1964/573/

== Also read ==
- C.F. Chiesa (2019). calcio serie a. ISBN 978-88-3324-184-5.
- Almanacco illustrato del calcio - La storia 1898-2004, Modena. Panini, 2004.
- Gli scudetti dimenticati: Bologna 1963-64 - Giallo a lieto fine, Manaresi Filippo, 1999.
- Il grande romanzo dello scudetto, Chiesa Carlo F.
- Federico Monti (2017). calcio serie a. ISBN 978-88-7381-866-3.
