= 1963–64 Bologna FC 1909 season =

Bologna Football Club
1963-64 season
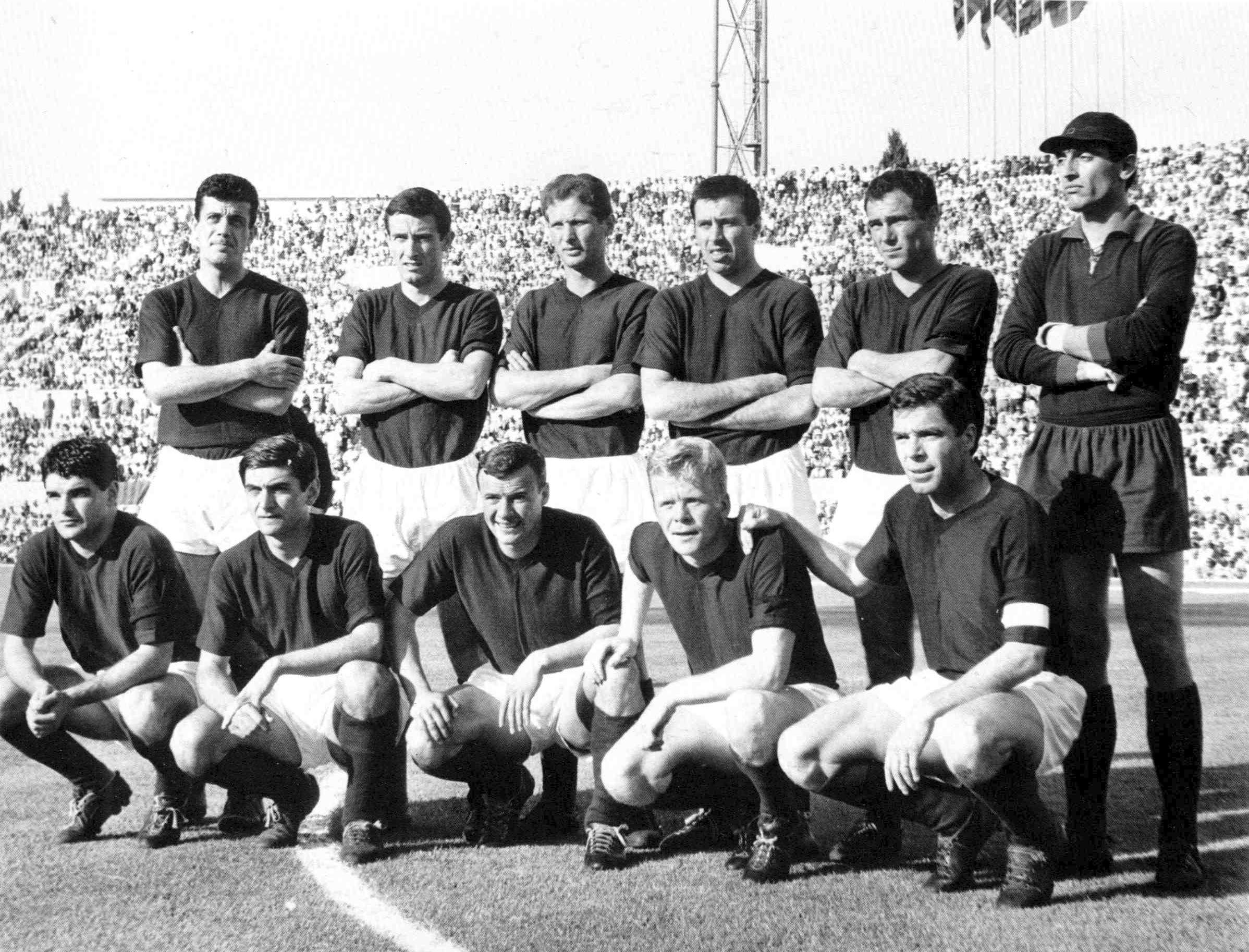
- Chairman: Renato Dall'Ara (until 4 June). Luigi Goldoni
- Manager: Fulvio Bernardini
- Serie A: 1st (in European Cup)
- Coppa Italia: Quarterfinals
- Mitropa Cup: Semifinals
- Top goalscorer: League: Nielsen (21); All: Nielsen (25)
Home colours	Away colours

During 1963–64 season Bologna F.C. competed in Serie A, Coppa Italia and Mitropa Cup.

== Summary ==
After World War II, the club was less successful. Throughout the 1950s and 1960s, the club generally floated between fourth, fifth and sixth position in the league, Things started to turn around when new manager and former 1928 Italy national team Olympian Fulvio Bernardini took his place on the Bologna touchline. On his resume, was Fiorentina's 1956 Serie A championship. On his arrival at the club, the side was already well stocked with talented players, but a few crucial ingredients were missing that would make Bologna true title contenders once again. Bernardini made several quality acquisition, such as the purchase of Harald Nielsen, a Denmark Olympic squad member who caught Bologna's eye at the Rome 1960 Games. Helmut Haller, the German international, also came on board. Like Nielsen, Haller was an amateur player who divided his time between football and driving a truck for a living. The club's owner, Renato Dall’Ara, personally went to Germany to sign the player. However, on his way back to Italy, Dall’Ara's car skidded off the road and crashed into a ditch. Without missing a beat, the old man emerged from the wreck waving Haller's contract and shouting, “Don’t worry about the accident, what matters is that we got this piece of paper signed!”

The next season, Haller and teammates like Ezio Pascutti with his spectacular diving headers delighted the Bologna faithful. However, they still only managed a fourth place finish and the finger was pointed at goalkeeper Santarelli, who at times was guilty of poor mistakes. The finishing touch came with the purchase of former Italy national team goalkeeper William Negri. Three wins a row launched the 1963/64 season, and despite a stuttering start after that, it was a win over Genoa that got Bologna's season back on track. The team regrouped and travelled to the San Siro for a difficult test against Inter. They played excellently, and Negri put in a top performance between the sticks, and the game ended in a goalless draw. From here, Bologna gained confidence and marched to ten successive victories, progressively making their way up the table. Nobody could believe what they were seeing. Even Helenio Herrera was shocked when his Inter lost in their second meeting. The Rossoblu kept moving towards their 7th Scudetto with a 2–1 win over AC Milan after which they found themselves leading both Milan clubs in the standings by three points. But three days after the Milan victory, everything came crashing down.

In March, the Italian Football Federation issued a statement that 5 Bologna players had tested positive for performance-enhancing drugs. They were immediately suspended and the club was docked 3 points. Everyone associated with Bologna FC was shocked, and nobody doubted the innocence of the players implicated for a moment. The notoriously tough and emotionless Fulvio Bernardini was in tears. So close to finally winning another title after a 23-year wait, it was about to be ripped away from them. Well, Bologna were having none of it. Protest marches exploded in the streets, the local media cried foul in the newspapers, and a team of Bolognese lawyers took on the case. While all this was happening, Renato Dall’Ara, by now an elderly man, was on the way out with a failing heart. The Bolognese prosecutor discovered that the tubes containing the urine samples from the players were not adequately sealed – therefore, anyone could have tampered with the specimens. In addition, the methamphetamine the samples contained was enough to kill a man. Meanwhile, other samples from the players, taken at the same time, were found perfectly sealed, in a double-locked refrigerator, with no traces of drugs whatsoever. The plot thickened. In the end, the players were acquitted of any wrongdoing. It was determined that the entire affair was an act of sabotage on behalf of the northern clubs to derail Bologna's season.

However, Bologna still lost 3 points while investigations continued and because of that, they struggled to keep up with Inter in the race for the Scudetto. The two teams matched each other win for win while Bologna anxiously awaited for the final investigation results. Finally it came – an established lack of evidence of any wrongdoing meant that the crucial three points would be returned to Bologna, bringing them level with Inter, with just three games to go. At the end of the season, both teams were still on equal points, which meant that for the first and only time in the history of the Serie A, a playoff would decide the ultimate champions. Four days before this penultimate match however, Bologna's emblematic president of 30 years, Renato Dall’Ara, died from a heart attack in the middle of a meeting in the offices of the Federation. The players were in tears, as Dall’Ara was not only their employer, he was like their father. Bologna's season from hell continued.: In his honour, Bologna took to the pitch against an Inter side who had just become European champions. Finally, the play-off kicked off.

After a goalless first half, Bologna defeated Milan 2–0 to win the Scudetto.

== Squad ==
Note: Flags indicate national team as defined under FIFA eligibility rules; some limited exceptions apply. Players may hold more than one non-FIFA nationality.

Pos.	Nation	Player
GK	ITA	William Negri
GK	ITA	Rino Rado
DF	ITA	Carlo Furlanis
DF	ITA	Mirko Pavinato (Captain)
DF	ITA	Paride Tumburus
DF	ITA	Francesco Janich
DF	ITA	Bruno Capra
DF	ITA	Edmondo Lorenzini
DF	ITA	Tazio Roversi
MF	FRG	Helmut Haller

Pos.	Nation	Player
MF	URU	Héctor Demarco
MF	ITA	Romano Fogli
MF	ITA	Giacomo Bulgarelli
MF	ITA	Marino Perani
MF	ITA	Bruno Franzini
MF	ITA	Sidio Corradi
FW	DEN	Harald Nielsen
FW	ITA	Ezio Pascutti
FW	ITA	Antonio Renna

=== Transfers ===
In
Pos.	Name	from	Type
GK	William Negri	Mantova	

Out
Pos.	Name	To	Type
MF	Renzo Ragonesi	Catanzaro	

== Competitions ==
=== Serie A ===
==== League table ====
Pos	Team	Pld	W	D	L	GF	GA	GD	Pts	Qualification or relegation
1	Bologna (C)	34	22	10	2	54	18	+36	54	Qualification to European Cup (Note: Inter qualified as defending champions.)
2	Internazionale (Note: After the title tie-breaker with Bologna (2–0).)	34	23	8	3	54	21	+33	54	Qualification to European Cup
3	Milan	34	21	9	4	58	28	+30	51	Chosen for Inter-Cities Fairs Cup
4	Fiorentina	34	14	10	10	43	27	+16	38	Chosen for Inter-Cities Fairs Cup
4	Juventus	34	14	10	10	49	37	+12	38	Chosen for Inter-Cities Fairs Cup

Source: Panini
(C) Champions

==== Results by round ====
Round	1	2	3	4	5	6	7	8	9	10	11	12	13	14	15	16	17	18	19	20	21	22	23	24	25	26	27	28	29	30	31	32	33	34	35
Ground	H	A	H	A	H	A	A	H	H	A	A	H	A	H	A	H	H	H	A	A	A	H	A	H	H	A	A	H	H	A	H	A	A	H	A
Result	D	D	W	W	W	D	L	D	W	D	W	W	W	W	W	W	W	W	W	D	D	D	W	W	W	L	W	W	W	W	D	D	W	W	W
Position	7	7	4	1	1	3	5	5	5	3	3	3	2	2	2	1	1	1	1	1	1	1	1	1	1	1	1	1	1	1	1	1	1	1	1

Source: Competitive matches
A = Away; H = Home; W = Win; D = Draw; L = Loss; = Leader, 1964-65 European Cup; = 1964–65 Inter-Cities Fairs Cup

==== Matches ====
15 September 1963 1	Bologna	1–1	Genoa	Bologna
	Pascutti 61'		79' Piaceri	Stadium: Comunale; Referee: Ettore Carminati

22 September 1963 2	Torino	0–0	Bologna	Turin
				Stadium: Comunale; Referee: Antonio Sbardella

25 September 1963 3	Bologna	2–0	Atalanta	Bologna
	Bulgarelli 31', 68'			Stadium: Comunale; Referee: Giuseppe Cirone

29 September 1963 4	Bologna	2–0	Fiorentina	Bologna
	Nielsen 20'; Bulgarelli 30'			Stadium: Comunale; Referee: Concetto Lo Bello

6 October 1963 5	Modena	1–4	Bologna	Modena
	Toro 66'		11', 43', 50' Nielsen; 72' Pascutti	Stadium: Stadio Alberto Braglia; Referee: Giulio Campanati

20 October 1963 6	Bologna	2–2	Milan	Bologna
	Haller 48'; Bulgarelli 53'		73' Mora; 90' (o.g.) Capra	Stadium: Comunale; Referee: Giuseppe Adami

23 October 1963 7	Sampdoria	2–0	Bologna	Genoa
	Frustalupi 17'; Wisnieski 20'			Stadium: Stadio Luigi Ferraris; Referee: Bruno De Marchi

27 October 1963 8	SPAL	0–0	Bologna	Ferrara
				Stadium: Comunale; Referee: Cesare Jonni

3 November 1963 9	Bologna	4–0	Roma	Bologna
	Nielsen 36', 62', 80'; Perani 84'			Stadium: Comunale; Referee: Gennaro Marchese

17 November 1963 10	Inter	0–0	Bologna	Milan
				Stadium: Stadio San Siro; Referee: Bruno De Marchi

24 November 1963 11	Bologna	3–0	Lanerossi	Bologna
	Nielsen 14'; Haller 75'; Bulgarelli 81'			Stadium: Comunale; Referee: Concetto Lo Bello

1 December 1963 12	Bari	0–1	Bologna	Bari
			1' Nielsen	Stadium: Stadio della Vittoria; Referee: Iginio Rigato

8 December 1963 13	Catania Calcio	1–3	Bologna	Catania
	Fanello 63'		46', 49', 75' Nielsen	Stadium: Stadio Cibali; Referee: Antonio Sbardella

22 December 1963 14	Bologna	2–1	Mantova	Bologna
	Nielsen 7'; Pascutti 18'		89' Mazzero	Stadium: Comunale; Referee: Alessandro D'Agostini

29 December 1963 15	Bologna	2–1	Juventus	Bologna
	Nielsen 37'; Bulgarelli 50'		76' Sívori	Stadium: Comunale; Referee: Francesco Francescon

5 January 1964 16	Messina	0–2	Bologna	Messina
			64' Perani; 80' Pascutti	Stadium: Stadio Giovanni Celeste; Referee: Antonio Sbardella

12 January 1964 17	Lazio	1–2	Bologna	Roma
	Morrone 76'		39' Tumburus; 81' Demarco	Stadium: Stadio Olimpico; Referee: Concetto Lo Bello

26 January 1964 18	Genoa	0–2	Bologna	Genoa
			52' (pen.) Haller; 76' Pascutti	Stadium: Stadio Luigi Ferraris; Referee: Cesare Jonni

2 February 1964 19	Bologna	4–1	Torino	Bologna
	Nielsen 16'; Pascutti 52'; Bulgarelli 60', 82'		83' Hitchens	Stadium: Comunale; Referee: Antonio Sbardella

9 February 1964 20	Atalanta	1–1	Bologna	Bergamo
	Magistrelli 36'		28' Fogli	Stadium: Comunale; Referee: Alessandro D'Agostini

16 February 1964 21	Fiorentina	0–0	Bologna	Florence
				Stadium: Comunale; Referee: Concetto Lo Bello

23 February 1964 22	Bologna	0–0	Modena	Bologna
				Stadium: Comunale; Referee: Antonio Sbardella

1 March 1964 23	Milan	1–2	Bologna	Milan
	Amarildo 6'		10' Nielsen; 36' Pascutti	Stadium: Stadio San Siro; Referee: Bruno De Marchi

8 March 1964 24	Bologna	1–0	Sampdoria	Bologna
	Haller 30' (pen.)			Stadium: Comunale; Referee: Iginio Rigato

22 March 1964 26	Roma	0–1	Bologna	Rome
			17' (pen.) Haller	Stadium: Stadio Olimpico; Referee: Francesco Francescon

29 March 1964 27	Bologna	1–2	Inter	Bologna
	Furlanis 76'		19' Corso; 49' Jair	Stadium: Comunale; Referee: Bruno De Marchi

5 April 1964 28	Lanerossi	1–3	Bologna	Vicenza
	Vinício 22'		47' Pascutti; 51' Nielsen; 87' Haller	Stadium: Stadio Romeo Menti; Referee: Cesare Jonni

14 April 1964 25	Bologna	2–1	SPAL	Bologna
	Nielsen 26'; Perani 73'		88' Muccini	Stadium: Comunale; Referee: Gennaro Marchese

19 April 1964 29	Bologna	3–1	Bari	Bologna
	Nielsen 28', 87'; Perani 43'		79' Rossi	Stadium: Comunale; Referee: Antonio Sbardella

26 April 1964 30	Bologna	1–0	Catania Calcio	Bologna
	Nielsen 18'			Stadium: Comunale; Referee: Giorgio Genel

3 May 1964 31	Mantova	0–0	Bologna	Mantova
				Stadium: Stadio Danilo Martelli; Referee: Francesco Francescon

17 May 1964 32	Juventus	0–0	Bologna	Turin
				Stadium: Comunale; Referee: Cesare Jonni

24 May 1964 33	Bologna	2–0	Messina	Bologna
	Perani 7', 16'			Stadium: Comunale; Referee: Bruno De Marchi

31 May 1964 34	Bologna	1–0	Lazio	Bologna
	Haller 17' (pen.)			Stadium: Comunale; Referee: Marchese

==== Championship tie-breaker ====
7 June 1964	Bologna	2–0	Inter	Rome
17:00	Facchetti 75' (o.g.); Nielsen 84'	Report		Stadium: Stadio Olimpico; Referee: Concetto Lo Bello

=== Coppa Italia ===
==== First round ====
8 September 1963	Udinese	0–2	Bologna	Udine
			10' Haller; 40' Nielsen	Stadium: Stadio Moretti; Referee: Sergio Ferrari

==== Second round ====
13 November 1963	Hellas Verona	0–1	Bologna	Verona
			93' (o.g.) Peretta	Stadium: Stadio Marcantonio Bentegodi

==== Third round ====
13 May 1964	Bologna	4–2	SPAL	Bologna
	Nielsen 9'; Perani 12'; Bulgarelli 17'; Renna 53'		39' Crippa; 71' Matassini	Stadium: Comunale; Referee: Alfeo Grignani

==== Quarterfinals ====
10 June 1964	Juventus	4–1	Bologna	Turin
	Bercellino II 11'; Sívori 32'; Menichelli 40', 46'		42' Renna	Stadium: Comunale; Referee: Aurelio Angonese

=== Mitropa Cup ===
==== Quarterfinals ====
18 June 1964	Bologna	1–0	(Socialist Federal Republic of Yugoslavia) OFK Belgrado	Bologna
	Pantani 69'			Stadium: Comunale; Referee: (Austria) Wlachojanis

20 June 1964	(Socialist Federal Republic of Yugoslavia) OFK Belgrado	2–2	Bologna	Belgrado
	Milosev 52'; Cebinac 78'		61' Vinicio; 84' Corradi	Stadium: Omladinski Stadium; Referee: (Hungary) Fehervari

==== Semifinals ====
1 July 1964	Bologna	2–2	(Czechoslovakia) Sparta Prague	Bologna
	Corradi 9'; Pantani 39'		10' (o.g.), 59' (o.g.) Tentorio	Stadium: Comunale; Referee: (Austria) Mayer

9 July 1964	(Czechoslovakia) Sparta Prague	3–0	Bologna	Prague
	Mráz 69'; Mašek 77'; Dyba 85'			Stadium: Stadion Letná; Referee: (Austria) Schiller

== Statistics ==
Competition	Points	Home						Away						Total						DR
Competition	Points	G	W	D	L	Gs	Ga	G	W	D	L	Gs	Ga	G	W	D	L	Gs	Ga	DR
Serie A	54	17	13	3	1	33	10	17	9	7	1	21	8	34	22	10	2	54	18	+36
Spareggio		-	-	-	-	-	-	1	1	0	0	2	0	1	1	0	0	2	0	+2
Coppa Italia		1	1	0	0	4	2	3	2	0	1	4	4	4	3	0	1	8	6	+2
Mitropa Cup		2	1	1	0	3	2	2	0	1	1	2	5	4	1	2	1	5	7	−2
Totals		20	15	4	1	40	14	23	12	8	3	29	17	43	27	12	4	69	31	+38

=== Players statistics ===
==== Appearances ====
- 36. (Germany) Helmut Haller
- 35. (Italy) William Negri
- 35. (Denmark) Harald Nielsen
- 35. (Italy) Francesco Janich
- 35. (Italy) Carlo Furlanis
- 34. (Italy) Giacomo Bulgarelli
- 34. (Italy) Romano Fogli
- 30. (Italy) Marino Perani
- 29. (Italy) Paride Tumburus
- 28. (Italy) Mirko Pavinato
- 25. (Italy) Ezio Pascutti
- 16. (Italy) Antonio Renna
- 12. (Italy) Bruno Capra
- 3. (Italy) Héctor Demarco
- 3. (Italy) Bruno Franzini
- 2. (Italy) Edmondo Lorenzini
- 1. (Italy) Sidio Corradi

==== Goalscorers ====
- 22. (Denmark) Harald Nielsen
- 8. (Italy) Giacomo Bulgarelli
- 8. (West Germany) Helmut Haller
- 8. (Italy) Ezio Pascutti
- 6. (Italy) Marino Perani
- 1. (Italy) Paride Tumburus
- 1. (Italy) Héctor Demarco
- 1. (Italy) Romano Fogli
- 1. (Italy) Carlo Furlanis
