= 1961 Mitropa Cup =

Tournament details
- Dates: June 1961 – April 1962
- Teams: 12

Final positions
- Champions: (Italy) FC Bologna (3rd title)
- Runners-up: (Czechoslovakia) Slovan Nitra

Tournament statistics
- Matches played: 24
- Goals scored: 110 (4.58 per match)
- Top scorers: (Czechoslovakia) Milan Dolinský; (Czechoslovakia) Viliam Hrnčár; (7 goals each)

The 1961 season of the Mitropa Cup football club tournament was won by FC Bologna who defeated Slovan Nitra 5–2 on aggregate in the final. It was the club's third victory in the competition, having previously won it in 1932 and 1934.

== Group stage ==
The 12 participating teams were split into three groups of four teams, who played each other once each. The matches took place between 18 June and 2 July, but the Group 3 game between Udinese and Kladno was replayed on 23 August.

=== Group 1 ===
Pos	Team	Pld	W	D	L	GF	GA	GD	Pts	Qualification
1	FC Bologna	3	2	1	0	6	3	+3	5	Advance to Semi finals
2	Austria Vienna	3	2	0	1	8	5	+3	4	
3	Spartak Praha Stalingrad	3	1	0	2	3	5	−2	2	
4	Sampdoria	3	0	1	2	3	7	−4	1	

18 June 1961

Spartak Praha Stalingrad (Czechoslovakia)	1 – 2	Austria Vienna
Kratochvíl		Nemec; Riegler

Prague
Attendance: 8,000
Referee: Iginio Rigato (Italy)
18 June 1961

Sampdoria (Italy)	1 – 1	(Italy) FC Bologna

Genoa
25 June 1961

Spartak Praha Stalingrad (Czechoslovakia)	1 – 3	(Italy) FC Bologna
Kaura		Gualtieri

Prague
Attendance: 6,000
25 June 1961

Austria Vienna	5 – 2	(Italy) Sampdoria

Vienna
2 July 1961

Sampdoria (Italy)	0 – 1	(Czechoslovakia) Spartak Praha Stalingrad
		Kopsa 36'

Genoa
Attendance: 12,000
Referee: Fritz Seipelt (Austria)
2 July 1961

FC Bologna (Italy)	2 – 1	Austria Vienna

Bologna

=== Group 2 ===
Pos	Team	Pld	W	D	L	GF	GA	GD	Pts	Qualification
1	Slovan Nitra	3	2	1	0	13	7	+6	5	Advance to Semi finals
2	ČH Bratislava	3	2	0	1	14	8	+6	4	
3	Torino	3	1	0	2	8	12	−4	2	
4	SV Stickstoff	3	0	1	2	9	17	−8	1	

18 June 1961

SV Stickstoff (Austria)	3 – 5	(Italy) Torino

Linz
18 June 1961

ČH Bratislava (Czechoslovakia)	2 – 4	(Czechoslovakia) Slovan Nitra
Dolinský 2'; Gajdoš		Fojtik; Navrátil 32'; Pucher 57'; Hrnčár

Bratislava
Attendance: 3,000
Referee: Alojz Obtulovič (Czechoslovakia)
25 June 1961

Slovan Nitra (Czechoslovakia)	5 – 1	(Italy) Torino
Barát; Hrnčár; Pucher; Navrátil; Bachratý		Gualtieri

Štadión pod Zoborom, Nitra
25 June 1961

ČH Bratislava (Czechoslovakia)	8 – 2	(Austria) SV Stickstoff
Dolinský 6', 23', 80', 82'; Gáborík 9'; Buberník 12', 77'; Scherer 64'		Wagner 52' (pen.); Polster 64'

Bratislava
Referee: Righi (Italy)
2 July 1961

SV Stickstoff (Austria)	4 – 4	(Czechoslovakia) Slovan Nitra
Kohlhauser; Polster		Hrnčár pen.' Pucher

Linz
Attendance: 500
Referee: Giuseppe Adami (Italy)
2 July 1961

Torino (Italy)	2 – 4	(Czechoslovakia) ČH Bratislava
Locatelli 19'; Mazzero 64'		Dolinský 27', 48'; Scherer 30'; Lancioni 58' (o.g.)

Stadio Filadelfia, Turin

=== Group 3 ===
Pos	Team	Pld	W	D	L	GF	GA	GD	Pts	Qualification
1	Udinese	3	2	1	0	9	5	+4	5	Advance to Semi finals
2	SONP Kladno	3	1	1	1	8	4	+4	3	Advance to Semi finals
3	LASK	3	0	2	1	4	7	−3	2	
4	Wiener Neustädt	3	1	0	2	5	10	−5	2	

18 June 1961

Wiener Neustädt (Austria)	4 – 1	(Austria) LASK

Stadion Wiener Neustadt, Vienna
25 June 1961

Wiener Neustädt (Austria)	0 – 5	(Czechoslovakia) SONP Kladno
		Kadraba; Majer; Šolc

Stadion Wiener Neustadt, Vienna
Attendance: 1,500
25 June 1961

LASK (Austria)	2 – 2	(Italy) Udinese

Linz
2 July 1961

Udinese (Italy)	4 – 1	(Austria) Wiener Neustädt

Stadio Moretti, Udine
2 July 1961

SONP Kladno (Czechoslovakia)	1 – 1	(Austria) LASK
Hájek		Kozlicek

Kladno
Attendance: 4,000
Referee: Carlo Gambarotta (Italy)
23 August 1961

Udinese (Italy)	3 – 2 (a.e.t.)	(Czechoslovakia) SONP Kladno
Andersson 117'; Pentrelli		Němeček; Hájek

Stadio Moretti, Udine

== Semi-finals ==
The matches took place between 1 and 29 November.

Team 1	Agg.	Team 2	1st leg	2nd leg
SONP Kladno (Czechoslovakia)	1–3	(Italy) Bologna	1–2	0–1
Slovan Nitra (Czechoslovakia)	5–4	(Italy) Udinese	4–3	1–1

=== First leg ===
1 November 1961

SONP Kladno (Czechoslovakia)	1 – 2	(Italy) Bologna
Kadraba		Demarco 76'; Renna 85'

Stadion Františka Kloze, Kladno
Attendance: 3,500
Referee: Horváth (Hungary)
1 November 1961

Slovan Nitra (Czechoslovakia)	4 – 3	(Italy) Udinese
Hrnčár; Pucher; Kisý		Mortensen; Segato pen.' Canella

Štadión pod Zoborom, Nitra
Attendance: 6,000
Referee: Baboucek (Austria)

=== Second leg ===
15 November 1961

Bologna (Italy)	1 – 0	(Czechoslovakia) SONP Kladno
Franzini 70'

Bologna
Attendance: 5,000
Referee: Steiber (Austria)

Bologna won 3–1 on aggregate.

29 November 1961

Udinese (Italy)	1 – 1	(Czechoslovakia) Slovan Nitra
Canella 59'		Pucher 49'

Stadio Moretti, Udine

Slovan Nitra won 5–4 on aggregate.

== Finals ==
The matches took place on 14 March and 4 April 1962.

Team 1	Agg.	Team 2	1st leg	2nd leg
Slovan Nitra (Czechoslovakia)	2–5	(Italy) FC Bologna	2–2	0–3

=== First leg ===
14 March 1962

Slovan Nitra (Czechoslovakia)	2–2	(Italy) FC Bologna
Bachratý 8'; Hrnčár 76' (pen.)		Nielsen 43'; Perani 55' (pen.)

Štadión pod Zoborom, Nitra
Attendance: 10,000

=== Second leg ===
4 April 1962

FC Bologna (Italy)	3–0	(Czechoslovakia) Slovan Nitra
Demarco 21'; Pascutti 47'; Nielsen 59'

Stadio Comunale, Bologna
Attendance: 10,000

FC Bologna won 5–2 on aggregate.
