= Tazio =

Tazio is a masculine Italian given name. Notable people with the name include:

- Tazio Nuvolari (1892–1953), Italian motorcycle and racecar driver
- Tazio Roversi (1947–1999), Italian footballer
- Tazio Secchiaroli (1925–1998), Italian photographer

== See also ==
- Thaddeus (given name)
