= Pietro Genovesi =

Italian footballer

Personal information
- Full name: Pietro Orlando Genovesi
- Date of birth: 27 June 1902
- Place of birth: Bologna, Italy
- Date of death: 4 August 1980 (aged 78)
- Position: Midfielder

Senior career*
Years	Team	Apps	(Gls)
1919–1933	Bologna	250	(35)

International career
1921–1930	Italy	10	(0)

Managerial career
- 1933–1934: Bologna
- 1939–1940: Molinella
- 1946: Bologna
Medal record
Representing Italy
Summer Olympics
Bronze medal – third place	1928 Amsterdam
Central European International Cup
Gold medal – first place	1927–30 Central European International Cup
- * Club domestic league appearances and goals

Pietro Genovesi (Italian pronunciation: [ˈpjɛːtro dʒenoˈveːzi, -eːsi]; 27 June 1902 – 4 August 1980) was an Italian association footballer who played as a midfielder. He competed in the 1928 Summer Olympics. and the 1927–30 Central European International Cup.

== International career ==
Genovesi was a member of the Italy national team that won the bronze medal in the 1928 Olympic football tournament, and the team that won the 1927–30 Central European International Cup.

== Honours ==
=== Club ===
Bologna

- Italian Football Championship: 1924–25, 1928–29

=== International ===
Italy

- Central European International Cup: 1927–30
- Olympic Bronze Medal: 1928
