= Giuseppe Spalazzi =

Italian footballer (1943–2025)

Giuseppe Spalazzi (17 March 1943 – 17 July 2025) was an Italian footballer who played as a goalkeeper.

== Background ==
After his competitive career, he settled in Chiavari, in Liguria, where he opened a boutique. He died on 17 July 2025, at the age of 82.

== Career ==
Raised in Agazzano, in 1958 he joined the youth team of Piacenza; he made his first team debut at the age of eighteen, on 19 March 1961 on the pitch of Mestrina, in the 1960–61 Serie C championship which ended with the relegation of the Emilians. He remained at Piacenza for the following two seasons in Serie D, as a reserve for Antonio Cucchetti first and Pietro Tappani later. In his three seasons with Piacenza Football Club, he made 9 appearances, conceding 11 goals.

In 1963 he was hired by Bologna, who added him to the De Martino: in his first season he took part in the Viareggio Tournament 1964 playing as a starter and losing the final against Dukla Prague. With the departure of Cimpiel he became a reserve for Negri and subsequently for Giuseppe Vavassori and made his Serie A debut on 23 May 1965, conceding five goals away to Torino. In the 1965–66 season he took part in 15 matches due to the unavailability of starter Negri; in that season he was an involuntary protagonist in the serious injury suffered by Bruno Mora, who fractured his tibia and fibula in a collision with the rossoblu goalkeeper. In 1966, in an evening friendly match in Riccione against local team, he was kicked by center forward Bighi, fracturing his jaw and remaining unavailable for more than six months. He made a slow recovery from this injury and played six games over the next two seasons. He closed his five-year stint with Petroniani with a total of 22 appearances and 27 goals conceded.

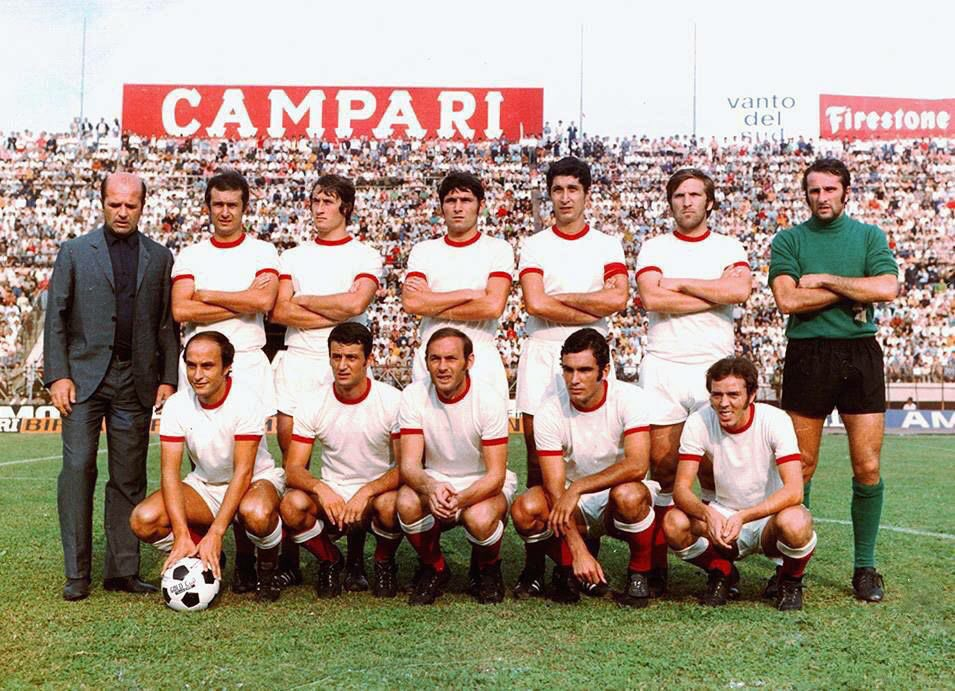
Spalazzi (standing, first from right) for Bari in the 1970–71 season

In 1968 he went down to Serie B, on loan to Bari for six million lire, in the deal that brought Lucio Mujesan to Bologna in exchange for six players. The Apulian team was promoted to Serie A in the 1968–69 season and Spalazzi was bought in full for a fee of 140 million. He played a total of four seasons as a starter for galletti (three in second division and one, the second, in Serie A) and was nicknamed the "kamikaze goalkeeper" by fans. He finished his Apulia experience with 121 league appearances, conceding 95 goals; Bari veteran Gianni Antonucci ranked him among Bari's eight best goalkeepers until 1972.

In 1972, he moved to Genoa, where he won the Serie B championship in his first season and was relegated the following season. After two seasons, in the summer transfer window of 1974 he moved to Palermo together with a compensation of 350 million lire, in exchange for Ignazio Arcoleo and Sergio Girardi; in the 1974–75 season he only played the Coppa Italia, because shortly before the start of the Serie B championship he seriously injured his knee. He tried in vain to recover for a year before finally ending his racing career.

== Honours ==
Genoa

- Serie B: 1972–73

== Bibliography ==
- Antonucci, Gianni (1998). 1908-1998: 90 Bari. Bari: Uniongrafica Corcelli.
