= Michal Pucher =

Slovak footballer (1931–1999)

Personal information
- Date of birth: 9 January 1931
- Place of birth: Svätý Jur, Czechoslovakia
- Date of death: 19 January 1999 (aged 68)
- Place of death: Slovakia
- Position: Forward

Senior career*
Years	Team	Apps	(Gls)
1952–1953	Sokol ČSSZ Prešov	38	(17)
1954	Křídla vlasti Olomouc	14	(7)
1959–1963	Slovan Nitra	101	(57)

Managerial career
- 1968: Spartak Tlmače
- 1970–1974: AC Nitra
- 1978–1979: ZVL Žilina
- 1980–1981: ZŤS Petržalka
- 1988: FK Spartak Vráble
- * Club domestic league appearances and goals

Michal Pucher (9 January 1931 – 19 January 1999) was a Slovak footballer who played as a striker. Later in his career, he was also a coach. He is most known for playing with Slovan Nitra, with which he is associated with the golden era of the club.

He played in the league for Sokol ČSSZ Prešov, Křídla vlasti Olomouc, and Slovan Nitra. With Nitra, Pucher was the top scorer of the 1st league in 1959–1960 with 18 goals. He played a total of 153 games in the league and scored 81 goals.

== Club career ==
Pucher grew up in Svätý Jur, from where he first started playing football for his school team in Partizánské. He debuted in the first league as a 21-year-old for ČSSZ Prešov, and spent the two-years in Trenčín and Olomouc. In 1955, he joined SK Bratislava. However, due to health problems, he only played a few matches. At a regular medical check-up in January 1956, doctors diagnosed him with a serious kidney disease. While living in Nitra, people from the local club came to him with the suggestion that MUDr. Štefan Griesbach should take care of him. After six months, his kidney disease was healed.

He later settled in Nitra, where he also got married in 1960. As a player, he contributed to the team's first promotion to the Czechoslovak League in 1959. In his debut season, he was the top goalscorer of the competition, scoring 19 goals. He helped the team to a historic second place in the federal league in 1962. He was a part of Slovan Nitra's success in the Mitropa Cup during the 1961–62 season. The Nitra team defeated FC Turin, SVS Linz and ČH Bratislava in the group stages, and going through against Udinese in the semi-finals. With the club, he made it to the final of the Mitropa Cup in 1961–62 against Bologna, whose team won its last title in the Italian league two years later. He played in the first final match, which was played on 14 March 1962 in Nitra and ended in a 2–2 draw. The rematch in Italy was played on 4 April 1962, the home team won it 3–0 and became the winner of the Mitropa Cup for the third time in its history.

== Coaching career ==
Pucher was the coach of Nitra in the 1970–1971 season, when he led the team from 2nd place behind Zbrojovka Brno back to the top competition. He coached Nitra in the First League three seasons. In the spring of 1978, he coached ZVL Žilina, but he did not prevent relegation from the top competition. He also worked in Žilina in the 1978–1979 season. In the 1980–1981 season, he coached the ZŤS Petržalka team and led them into the First League.
