= Tepa Sport =

Italian shoe company

- Company type: Private
- Industry: Sportswear
- Founded: 1952; 74 years ago
- Headquarters: Italy

Tepa Sport is an Italian sports shoe company. It previously sponsored Italian Serie A side Bologna.

== History ==
Tepa Sports was created in 1952 by the brothers Paolo, Rino, and Battista Riva. It grew in popularity during the 1960s, reaching 400 employees in 1970. It went bankrupt and closed down in 1985.

The brand was mentioned in Elio e le Storie Tese's song Supergiovane (1992).

In 2017, after a legal dispute, the brand was relaunched by the Riva family.
