= Ulisse Gualtieri =

Italian footballer

Personal information
- Date of birth: 27 March 1941 (age 85)
- Place of birth: Casalbuttano ed Uniti, Kingdom of Italy
- Position: Forward

Senior career*
Years	Team	Apps	(Gls)
1958–1959	Vigevano	4	(0)
1959–1964	Torino	31	(5)
1963–1964	Cosenza Calcio	21	(2)
1964–1965	Modena	12	(0)
1965–1966	Torino	3	(0)
1966–1967	Alessandria	29	(5)
1967–1971	Livorno	114	(12)
1972	Toronto Italia		
1972–1973	Sarzanese	7	(12)
- * Club domestic league appearances and goals

Ulisse Gualtieri (born 27 March 1941) is an Italian former footballer who played as a forward.

== Career ==
Gualtieri played in the Serie B with Vigevano Calcio in 1958. The following season he played with Torino F.C., and assisted in securing promotion to the Serie A by winning the league. He made his debut in the Serie A on 26 March 1961 against LR Vicenza. Following a lengthy tenure with Torino he returned to the Serie B in 1963 and played with Cosenza Calcio. He later had further stints in the Serie B with various clubs as Modena F.C. 2018, U.S. Alessandria Calcio 1912, and AS Livorno.

In 1965, he returned to play in the Serie A with former club Torino. In the summer of 1972 he played in the National Soccer League with Toronto Italia. In 1972, he played in the Serie D with A.S.D. Sarzanese Calcio 1906.
