= Paride Tumburus =

Italian footballer

Personal information
- Full name: Paride Tumburus
- Date of birth: 8 March 1939
- Place of birth: Aquileia, Italy
- Date of death: 24 October 2015 (aged 76)
- Place of death: Aquileia, Italy
- Height: 1.74 m (5 ft 8 1/2 in)
- Position: Defender

Senior career*
Years	Team	Apps	(Gls)
1959–1968	Bologna	200	(4)
1968–1970	Lanerossi Vicenza	26	(6)
1970–1971	Rovereto	16	(0)
Total		242	(8)

International career
1962–1963	Italy	4	(0)

Managerial career
- 1972–1973: Pordenone
- 1974–1975: Pordenone
- * Club domestic league appearances and goals

Paride Tumburus (Italian pronunciation: [ˈpaːride ˈtumburus]; 8 March 1939 – 24 October 2015) was an Italian footballer who played as a defender.

== Club career ==
Born in Aquileia, Tumburus played club football for Bologna F.C. 1909 and Vicenza Calcio, before retiring after a season with Rovereto in 1971.

== International career ==
At international level, Tumburus earned four caps for the Italy national football team between 1962 and 1963, and participated in the 1962 FIFA World Cup as well as the 1960 Olympic Games on home soil, in which is country managed a fourth-place finish.

== Death ==
Tumburus died of a heart attack in his home town of Aquileia on 23 October 2015.

== Honours ==
=== Club ===
Bologna

- Serie A: 1963–64
