= Edmondo Lorenzini =

Italian footballer (1937–2020)

Personal information
- Date of birth: 3 September 1937
- Place of birth: Ancona, Italy
- Date of death: 12 August 2020 (aged 82)
- Height: 1.80 m (5 ft 11 in)
- Position: Full back

Senior career*
Years	Team	Apps	(Gls)
1958–1960	Sambenedettese		
1960–1964	Bologna		
1964–1965	Brescia		
1965–1968	Catanzaro		
1968–1973	Sorrento		
- * Club domestic league appearances and goals

Edmondo Lorenzini (3 September 1937 – 12 August 2020) was an Italian professional footballer who played as a full-back.

== Career ==
He played for Bologna between 1960 and 1964, with whom he won the 1961 Mitropa Cup and the 1964 league title. He also played for Sambenedettese, Brescia, Catanzaro and Sorrento.
