= Francesco Janich =

Italian footballer (1937–2019)

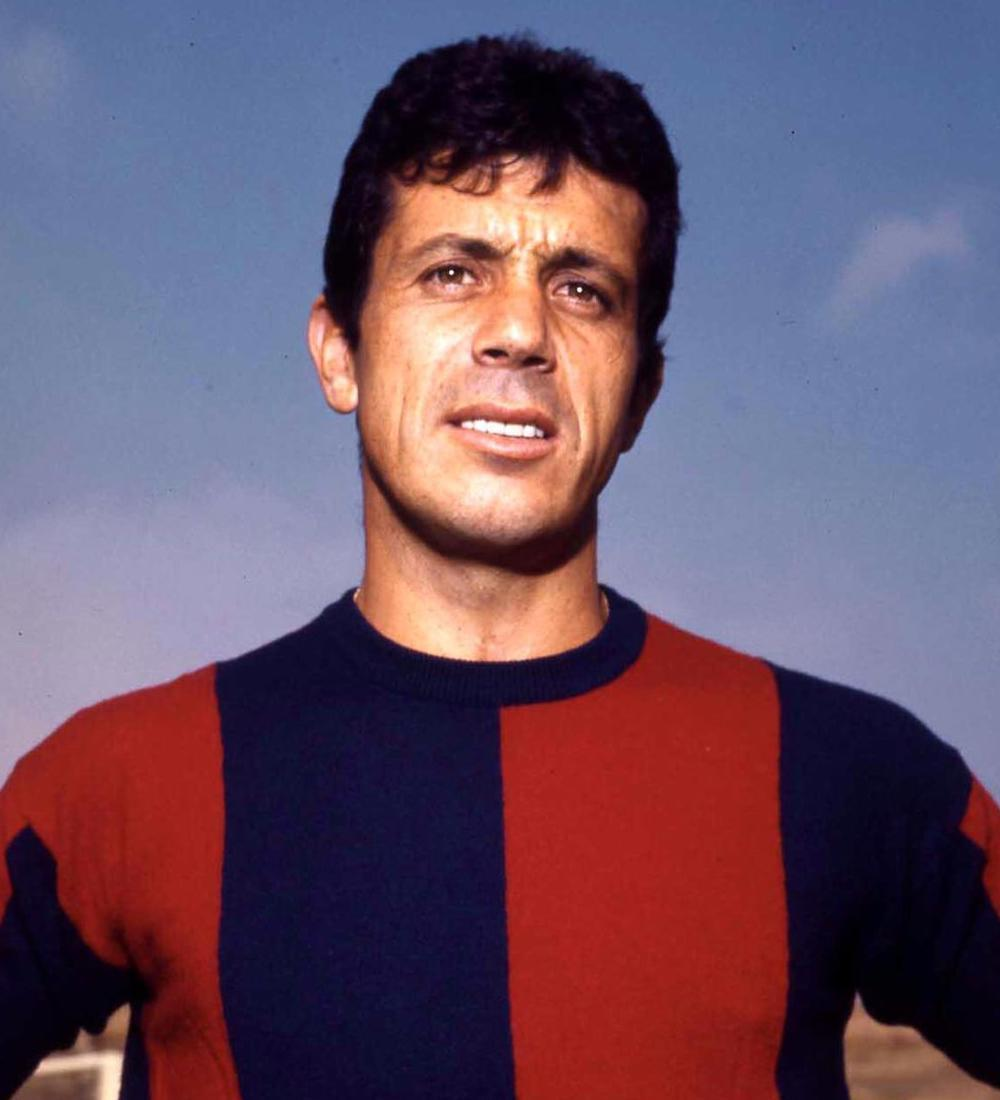
- Janich with Bologna

Personal information
- Full name: Francesco Janich
- Date of birth: 27 March 1937
- Place of birth: Udine, Kingdom of Italy
- Date of death: 2 December 2019 (aged 82)
- Place of death: Nemi, Italy
- Height: 1.80 m (5 ft 11 in)
- Position: Sweeper

Senior career*
Years	Team	Apps	(Gls)
1956–1958	Atalanta	38	(0)
1958–1961	Lazio	93	(0)
1961–1972	Bologna	294	(0)
1972–1973	Lucchese	23	(0)
Total		448	(0)

International career
1962–1966	Italy	6	(0)
- * Club domestic league appearances and goals

Francesco Janich (Italian pronunciation: [franˈtʃesko ˈjaːnitʃ]; 27 March 1937 – 2 December 2019) was an Italian footballer who played as a sweeper.

== Club career ==
During his club career, Janich played for Atalanta (1956–58), Lazio (1958–61), and Bologna (1961–72) in Serie A, as well as Lucchese (1972–73) in Serie C. He played for the Coppa Italia winners in 1958 (Lazio) and 1970 (Bologna). He was a member of the 1963–64 Serie A champions, Bologna. Over his entire 448-match career, he never scored a goal. He set a record that he played more games never having received a red card or been expelled from a match.

== International career ==
At international level, Janich earned six caps for the Italy national football team, and played in both the 1962 and 1966 World Cups.

== Management career ==
From 1972 to 1976 and 1978 to 1980, Janich was the general director at Napoli. He spent a year in between as the general director of Lazio.

He later moved to Bari, but was suspended for six months from football as a result of his involvement in the Totonero 1986 match-fixing scandal.
