= William Negri =

Italian footballer and manager (1935–2020)

- Negri in 1965

Personal information
- Full name: William Negri
- Date of birth: 30 July 1935
- Place of birth: Bagnolo San Vito, Italy
- Date of death: 26 June 2020 (aged 84)
- Place of death: Mantua, Italy
- Position: Goalkeeper

Senior career*
Years	Team	Apps	(Gls)
1948–1952	Indomita Mantova	?	(0)
1952–1954	Governolese	?	(0)
1954–1957	Mantova	19	(0)
1957	→ Palermo (loan)	0	(0)
1957–1958	→ Bagheria (loan)	6	(0)
1958–1963	Mantova	159	(0)
1963–1967	Bologna	79	(0)
1967	→ Mantova (loan)	0	(0)
1967–1968	Vicenza	26	(0)
1968–1969	Genoa	6	(0)
1970–1971	Mantova	0	(0)

International career
1962–1965	Italy	12	(0)

Managerial career
- 1972–1973: Mantova
- * Club domestic league appearances and goals

William Negri (Italian pronunciation: [ˈwilljam ˈneːɡri]; 30 July 1935 – 26 June 2020) was an Italian association football manager and footballer who played as a goalkeeper. He represented the Italy national football team 12 times, the first being on 11 November 1962, on the occasion of a friendly match against Austria in a 2–1 away win.

On 26 June 2020, Negri died in Mantua at the age of 84.
