= Gianni Rossi =

Italian footballer

Personal information
- Date of birth: 14 October 1936
- Place of birth: Venice, Italy
- Date of death: 25 September 2021 (aged 84)
- Height: 1.71 m (5 ft 7 1/2 in)
- Position: Midfielder

Senior career*
Years	Team	Apps	(Gls)
1955–1962	Venezia	124	(24)
1962–1963	Juventus	5	(1)
1963–1966	Bari	55	(2)
1968–1969	Sottomarina	17	(0)
- * Club domestic league appearances and goals

Gianni Rossi (14 October 1936 – 25 September 2021) was an Italian professional footballer and manager. He played as a midfielder for Venezia, Juventus, Bari and Sottomarina.
