= Ezio Pascutti =

Italian footballer

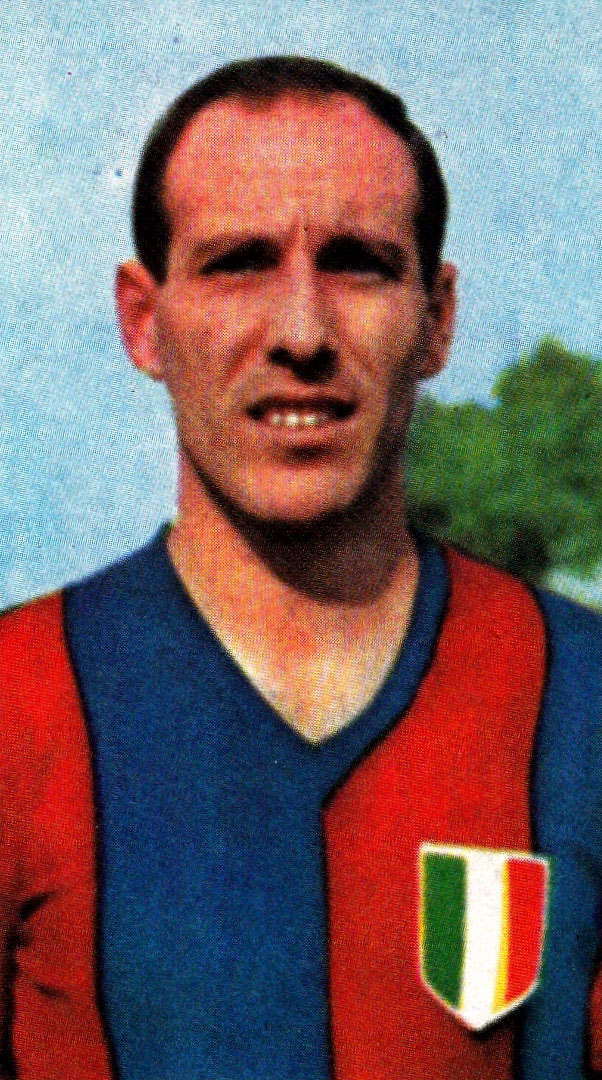
- Pascutti with Bologna in the 1964–65 season

Personal information
- Date of birth: 1 June 1937
- Place of birth: Mortegliano, Italy
- Date of death: 4 January 2017 (aged 79)
- Place of death: Bologna, Italy
- Height: 1.74 m (5 ft 9 in)
- Position: Forward

Senior career*
Years	Team	Apps	(Gls)
1955–1969	Bologna	296	(130)

International career
1958–1967	Italy	17	(8)

Managerial career
- 1986–1987: Sassuolo
- * Club domestic league appearances and goals

Ezio Pascutti (Italian pronunciation: [ˈɛttsjo paˈskutti]; 1 June 1937 – 4 January 2017) was an Italian football manager and player, who played as a forward, either as a striker or as a winger. He spent his entire club career with Bologna, and represented Italy at two FIFA World Cups.

== Club career ==
Although he was born in Mortegliano, Udine, Pascutti spent his entire club career with Bologna, playing 296 Serie A matches and scoring 130 goals in his 14 seasons with the club, from 1955 to 1969. In total, he made 336 appearances for Italian side (19 in the Coppa Italia, 3 in the European Cup, 12 in the Inter-Cities Fairs Cup, and 6 in the Mitropa Cup), scoring 142 goals in official matches (7 in the Coppa Italia, 1 in the European Cup, and 4 in the Mitropa Cup), making him the club's third-highest goalscorer of all time behind only Angelo Schiavio and Carlo Reguzzoni. Pascutti formed a particularly formidable partnership with fellow winger Marino Perani, and the duo would be instrumental in Bologna capturing the 1961 Mitropa Cup as well as its seventh and, as of 2019, last Serie A championship in 1964. Pascutti also set the record for most consecutive games scored at the start of a Serie A season at 10 in 1962. This stood for 32 years until being bettered by one game by Fiorentina's Gabriel Batistuta at the start of the 1994-95 campaign.

== International career ==
Pascutti earned 17 caps and scored 8 goals for the Italy national football team from 1958 to 1967. He played in the 1962 and 1966 World Cups with Italy.

== Death ==
Pascutti died on 4 January 2017, in a Bologna care home due to an illness, at the age of 79.

== Style of play ==
A quick, physical, and prolific forward, Pascutti was capable of playing both as a striker or as a winger, due to his ability to both score and create goals. Although he wasn't a particularly flamboyant player or gifted with exceptional dribbling skills, he became a club symbol with the Bologna fans due to his exceptional goalscoring ability, in particular in the penalty area. An accurate finisher with his feet as well as with his head, he was known for his ability in the air, despite not being particularly tall, and for his capacity to get on the end of crosses. Despite his ability, his career was often afflicted by leg injuries.

== Honours ==
Bologna

- Serie A: 1963–64
- Mitropa Cup: 1961
