= Romano Fogli =

Italian footballer (1938–2021)

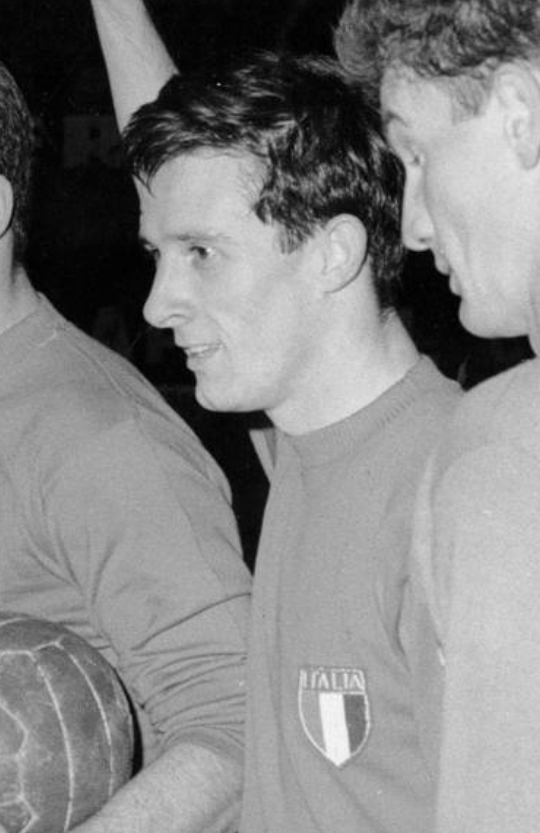
- Fogli in 1962

Personal information
- Full name: Romano Fogli
- Date of birth: 21 January 1938
- Place of birth: Santa Maria a Monte, Kingdom of Italy
- Date of death: 21 September 2021 (aged 83)
- Height: 1.72 m (5 ft 8 in)
- Position: Midfielder

Senior career*
Years	Team	Apps	(Gls)
1955–1958	Torino		
1958–1968	Bologna		
1968–1970	A.C. Milan		
1970–1974	Catania		

International career
1958–1967	Italy	13	(0)

Managerial career
- 1980–1983: Reggiana
- 1983–1984: Foggia
- 1984–1985: Livorno
- 1986: Barletta
- 1987–1988: Siena
- * Club domestic league appearances and goals

Romano Fogli (Italian pronunciation: [roˈmaːno ˈfɔʎʎi]; 21 January 1938 – 21 September 2021) was an Italian football player and manager who played as a midfielder.

In 2021, he was inducted into the Italian Football Hall of Fame.

== Club career ==
Fogli was born in Santa Maria a Monte, near Pisa. During his club career he played for Torino F.C., Bologna F.C. 1909, A.C. Milan, and Calcio Catania.

== International career ==
At international level, Fogli earned 13 caps for the Italy national team from 1958 to 1967, and participated in the 1966 FIFA World Cup.

== Managerial career ==
After retiring from playing football, Fogli became a manager, including a stint at his former club Bologna in 1993.

== Honours ==
Bologna

- Serie A: 1963–64

AC Milan

- European Cup: 1968–69

Individual

- Italian Football Hall of Fame: 2021
