= Marino Perani =

Italian footballer and manager

- Angelo Castronaro (left) and Marino Perani (right) 1970

Personal information
- Full name: Marino Perani
- Date of birth: 27 October 1939
- Place of birth: Ponte Nossa, Italy
- Date of death: 18 October 2017 (aged 77)
- Place of death: Bologna, Italy
- Position: Forward

Youth career
- Atalanta

Senior career*
Years	Team	Apps	(Gls)
1956–1958	Atalanta	31	(6)
1958–1959	Bologna	25	(3)
1959–1960	Padova	28	(8)
1960–1974	Bologna	296	(61)
1974–1975	Toronto Metros-Croatia	8	(1)
Total		388	(79)

International career
1966	Italy	4	(1)
- * Club domestic league appearances and goals

Marino Perani (Italian pronunciation: [maˈriːno peˈraːni]; 27 October 1939 – 18 October 2017) was an Italian football manager and player, who played as a forward, usually as a winger.

== Club career ==
Born in Ponte Nossa, in the province of Bergamo, Lombardy, Perani came through the Atalanta youth system before joining the senior side. During his club career, he played for several other Italian teams, such as Bologna and Padova. He joined Bologna in 1958, where he spent most of his career, 15 seasons in total, remaining with the team until the 1973–74 season, aside from a brief stint away during the 1959–60 season. Although Perani initially struggled to break into the starting line-up with the Bolognese side, due to competition from other players, he later won a starting shirt over several other wingers in the side, such as Bruno Pace, Antonio Renna, and Giovanni Vastola, inheriting Cesarino Cervellati's role on the right flank. Perani formed a formidable partnership with fellow winger Ezio Pascutti; together, they helped Bologna win the Serie A title during the 1963–64 season, and Perani even set up Harald Nielsen's goal in a decisive 2–0 win over Inter in the Serie A playoff match at the Stadio Olimpico in Rome, on 7 June 1964, which allowed Bologna to claim the league title. In total, he made 322 appearances for Bologna, scoring 70 goals, and also won two Coppa Italia titles with the club. Perani closed his career with NASL side Toronto Metros-Croatia in 1975. In total, he scored over 80 goals throughout his career.

== International career ==
At international level, Perani earned 4 caps and scored 1 goal for the Italy national football team in 1966, and also participated in the 1966 FIFA World Cup in England that year, where Italy suffered a first round elimination following an infamous defeat to North Korea.

== Style of play ==
A diminutive, creative, hard-working, and skilful right winger, with an eye for goal, Perani was mainly known for his vision, crossing accuracy, and his ability to cover the flank; he also possessed an accurate long-distance shot. Although his performances often proved decisive, he was also known to be inconsistent at times.

== Coaching career ==
Following his retirement, Perani worked for his former club Bologna as a coach for the team's youth side, and even coached the senior side during the late 70s.

== Personal life ==
He was married to Liliana Innocenti from 1961 until her death on 8 December 2001. In 2014, Perani got married at the age of 75 to the Bolognese businesswoman Anna Ciano at the Palazzo D'Accursio.

== Honours ==
=== Player ===
Bologna

- Mitropa Cup: 1961
- Serie A: 1963–64
- Coppa Italia: 1969–70, 1973–74
- Anglo-Italian League Cup: 1970

=== Manager ===
Parma

- Serie C1 (Girone A): 1983–84
