= Tazio Roversi =

Italian footballer

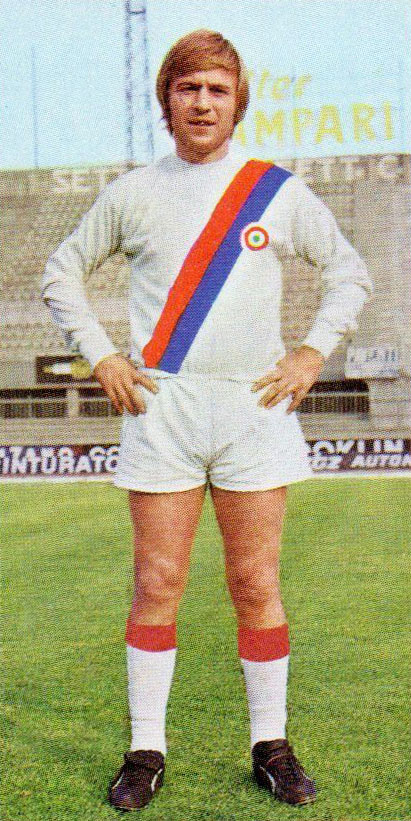
- Roversi with Bologna in 1970

Personal information
- Date of birth: 21 March 1947
- Place of birth: Moglia, Italy
- Date of death: 17 October 1999 (aged 52)
- Place of death: Bologna, Italy
- Position: Defender

Senior career*
Years	Team	Apps	(Gls)
1962–1963	Moglia	12	(0)
1963–1979	Bologna	341	(2)
1979–1981	Verona	21	(0)
1981–1983	Carpi	59	(0)

International career
1971	Italy	1	(0)
- * Club domestic league appearances and goals

Tazio Roversi (Italian pronunciation: [ˈtattsjo roˈvɛrsi]; 21 March 1947 – 17 October 1999) was an Italian footballer who played as a defender. On 20 November 1971, he represented the Italy national football team on the occasion of a friendly match against Austria in a 2–2 home draw.

== Honours ==
=== Player ===
Bologna

- Serie A: 1963–64
- Coppa Italia: 1969–70, 1973–74
