= Héctor Demarco =

Uruguayan footballer (1936-2010)

Personal information
- Date of birth: 31 May 1936
- Date of death: 21 June 2010 (aged 74)
- Position: Forward

International career
Years	Team	Apps	(Gls)
1955–1959	Uruguay	14	(3)

Héctor Demarco (31 May 1936 – 21 June 2010) was a Uruguayan footballer. He played in 14 matches for the Uruguay national football team from 1955 to 1959. He was also part of Uruguay's squad for the 1956 South American Championship.
