= Bologna FC 1909 =

Italian football club

Bologna
- Full name: Bologna Football Club 1909 S.p.A.
- Nicknames: I Rossoblù (The Red and Blues); I Veltri (The Greyhounds); I Felsinei (The Felsinians); I Petroniani (The Petronians)
- Founded: 3 October 1909; 117 years ago
- Stadium: Stadio Renato Dall'Ara
- Capacity: 36,532
- Owner: BFC 1909 Lux SPV S.A. (99.93%)
- President: Joey Saputo
- Head coach: Raffaele Palladino
- League: Serie A
- 2025–26: Serie A, 8th of 20
- Website: www.bolognafc.it
| Home colours | Away colours | Third colours |

Bologna Football Club 1909, commonly referred to as Bologna (Italian pronunciation: [boˈloɲɲa]), is an Italian professional football club based in Bologna, Emilia-Romagna that plays in Serie A, the top flight of Italian football. The club have won seven top-flight titles, three Coppa Italia titles, and one UEFA Intertoto Cup.

Founded in 1909, Bologna were founding members of Serie A, and won many of their league championships during the late 1930s. The club ceded any league dominance by 1964, when it won its last league title to date. They won two Coppa Italia titles in the 1970s, before battling relegation throughout the latter part of the 20th century. Bologna changed ownership multiple times during the early 2000s and 2010s, due to financial mismanagement, and later stabilized under the guise of a Canadian consortium led by Joey Saputo.

Bologna have participated in 79 Serie A seasons, which is the ninth-most in Italian football history. The club have played in the Stadio Renato Dall'Ara since 1927, which is the tenth-largest stadium by capacity in Serie A.

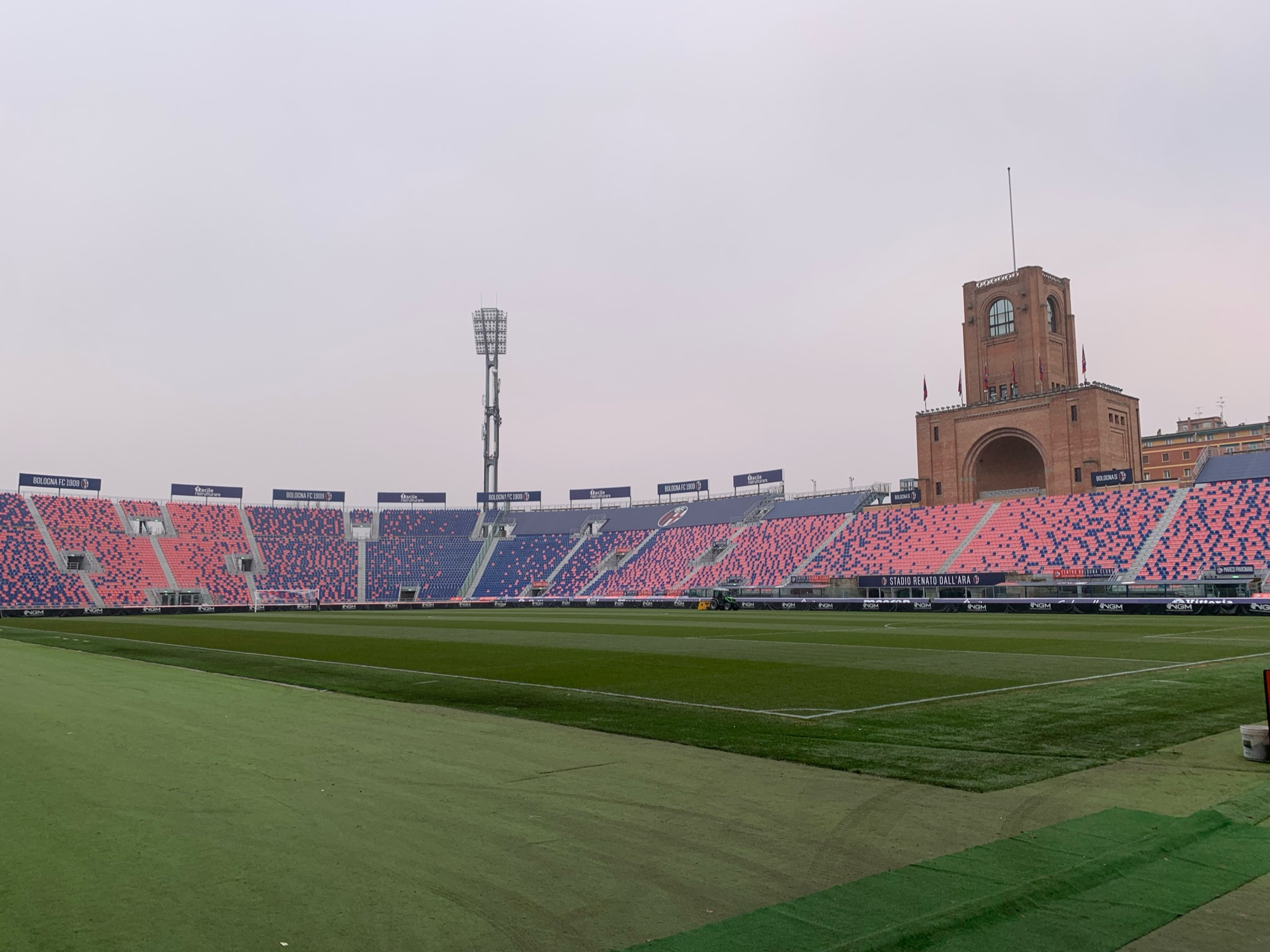
Bologna's Renato Dall‘Ara Stadium in 2021

== History ==
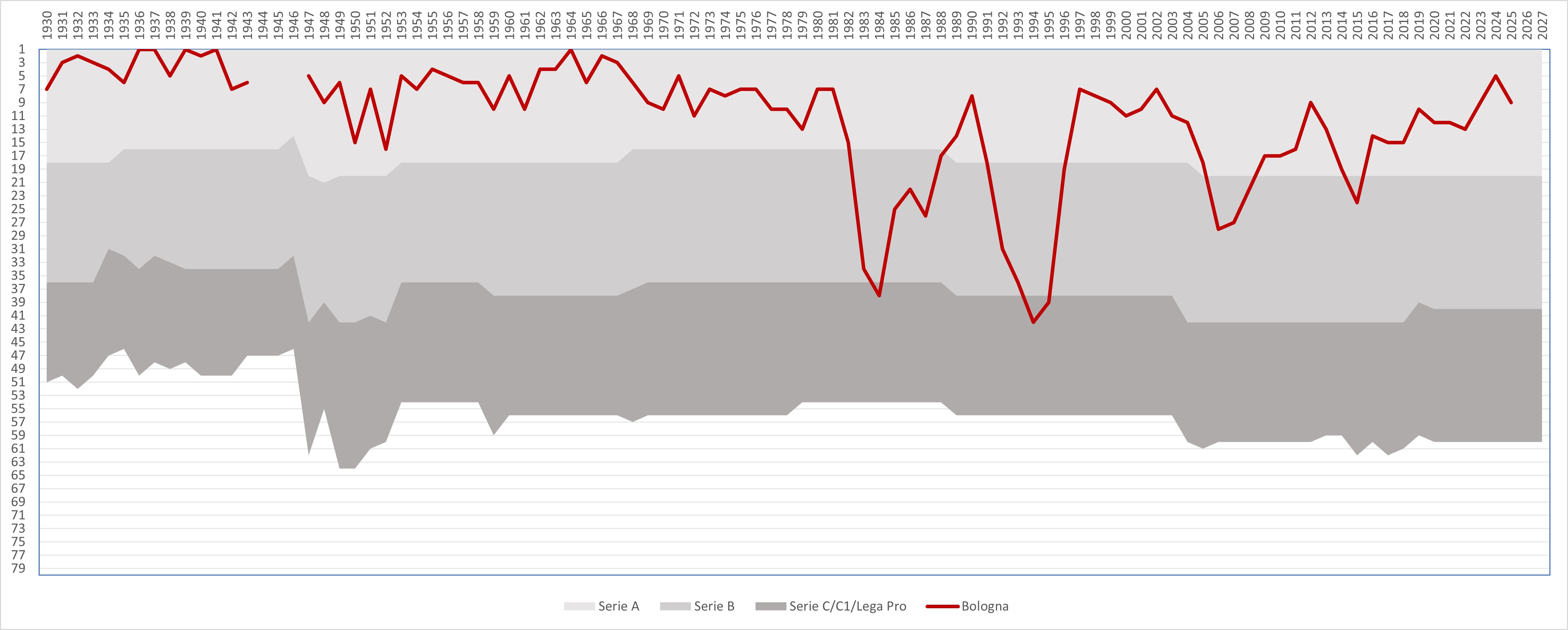
The performance of Bologna in the Italian football league structure since the first season of a unified Serie A (1929/30).

Bologna Football Club's formation was orchestrated by Emilio Arnstein, an Austrian who became interested in football at university in Vienna and Prague. He and his brother had previously founded another football club, Black Star, in Austria.

The club was founded on 3 October 1909, in the Northern Italian city of Bologna. Upon its formation, Carlo Sandoni was the club's sponsor and general manager, Swiss Louis Rauch became president, nobleman Guido Della Valle was the vice-president, Enrico Penaglia secretary, Sergio Lampronti cashier, while Emilio Arnstein and Leone Vincenzi were appointed councilmen.

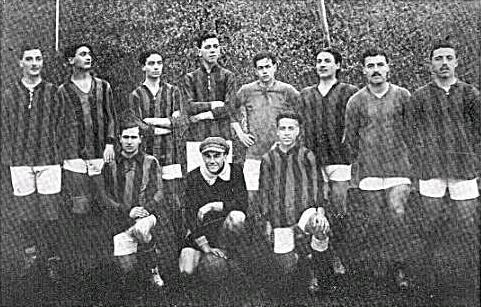
Bologna squad from the 1912 season.

On 20 March 1910, Bologna played their first ever game, against Virtus, who wore white shirts. Bologna outclassed their opponents, winning 9–1. The first football squad featured; Koch, Chiara, Pessarelli, Bragaglia, Guido Della Valle, Nanni, Donati, Rauch, Bernabeu, Mezzano, and Gradi.

Their formative season was spent in the regional league under Arrigo Gradi as captain, Bologna won their league gaining promotion to a league named Group Veneto-Emiliano. They spent four seasons in this league, never finishing lower than fifth. Bologna were entered into the Northern League before all football leagues were postponed for World War I.

=== Champions: 1920s and 1930s ===
After the first war, Bologna began to become more successful. First reaching the semi-finals of the Northern Italian competition in 1919–20, they went one better the following season by reaching the Northern League finals, going out 2–1 to Pro Vercelli. They would equal this again in 1923–24, coming runner up to eventual national champions Genoa.

Bologna became Northern and National League champions for the first time during 1924–25, beating Genoa CFC after five hard-fought final matches to take the championship. The finals against the Ligurian giants were marred by heavy crowd troubles. A few seasons later Bologna became champions of Italy for the second time in 1928–29 giving them a foothold in Italian football, building up a legacy, this was the last time the league was competed in the old system, Serie A was instated the following year.

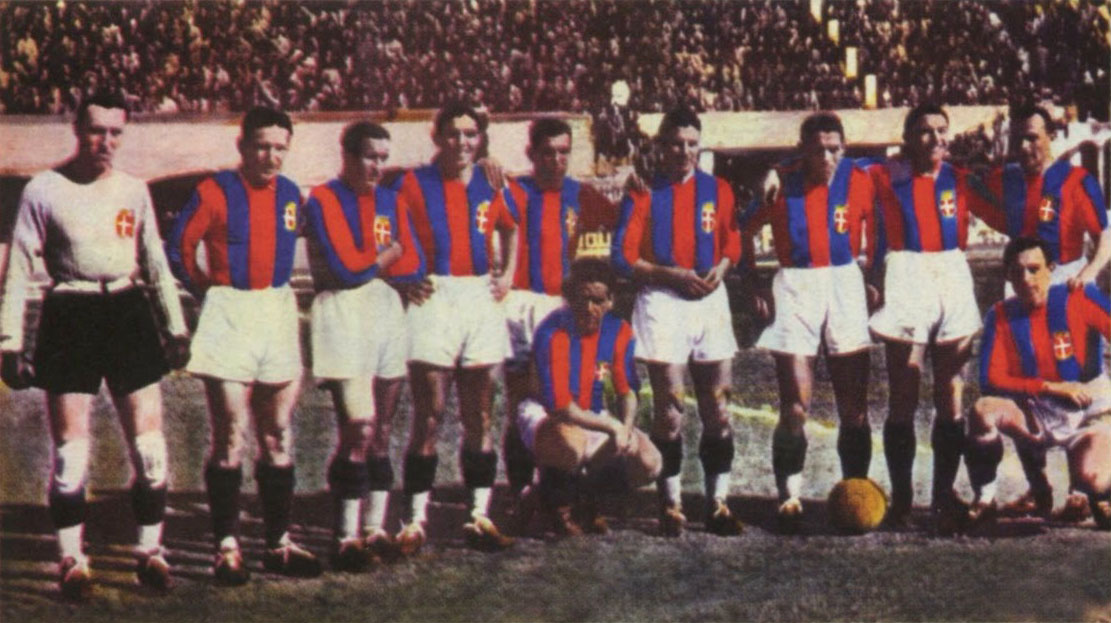
1936–37 Italian champion Bologna.

Bologna won the Scudetto three more times before World War II, in 1935–36, 1936–37 and 1938–39, and once during the war (1940–41).

=== Post-World War II ===
After World War II, the club was less successful. Throughout the 1950s and 1960s, the club generally floated between fourth, fifth and sixth position in the league, until they took the league title back in 1963–64. To date this remains their last Serie A championship, bringing the club's total to seven. This qualified Bologna to the 1964–65 European Cup (today UEFA Champions League), but they were eliminated in the preliminary round against Anderlecht.

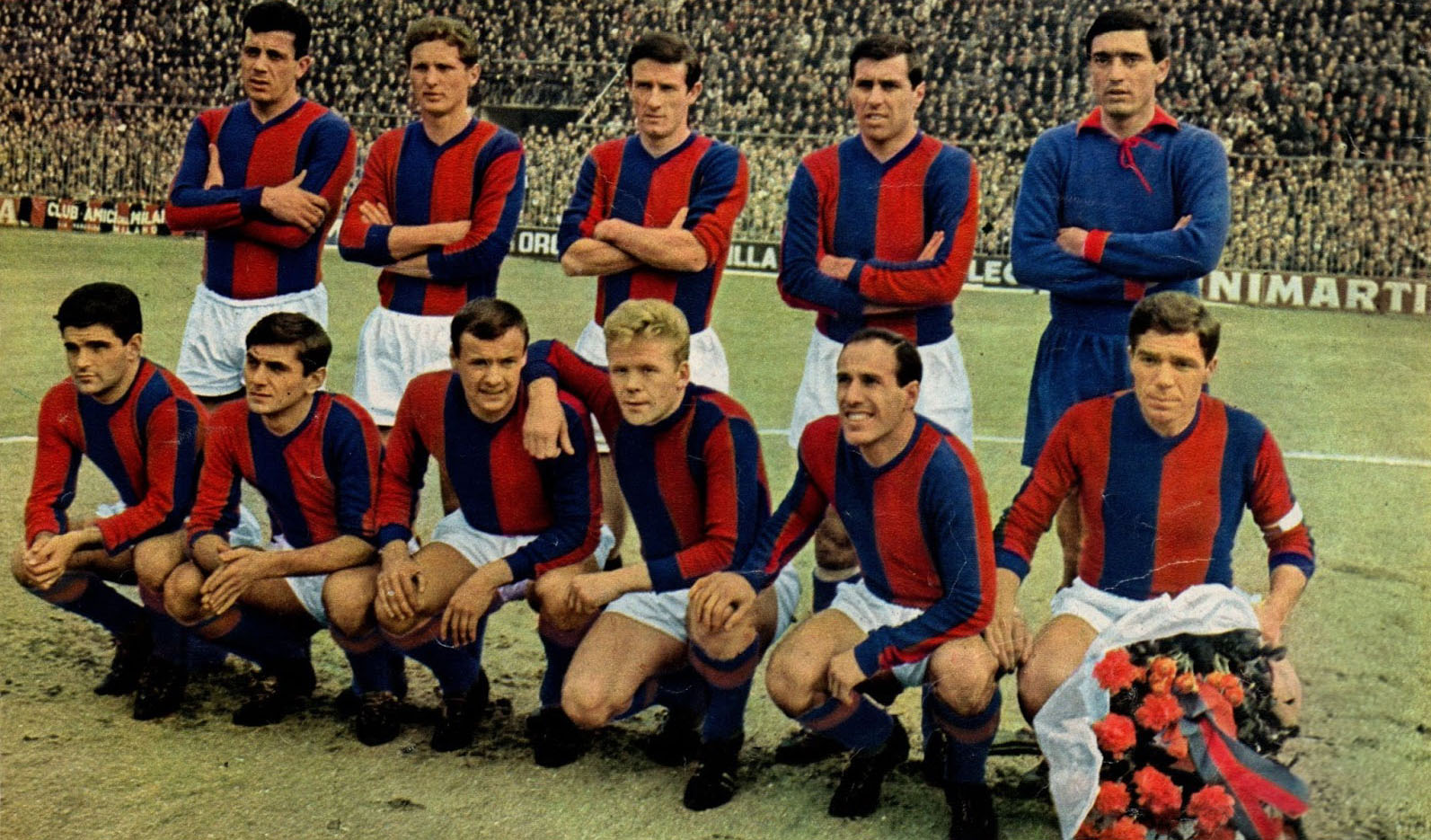
The last Bologna side to win the scudetto, in the 1963–64 season.

It was not all doom and gloom for the club, however; in the 1970s, they won the Italian Cup twice, the second final of which was against Palermo. The game was tense and finished 1–1 before going to a penalty shootout, where Bologna won 4–3.

=== Climbing down and back up the Leagues ===
Beginning in the 1981–82 season, the club began to slide. First, they were relegated from Serie A after battling it out for survival with Cagliari and Genoa. They were relegated twice in succession and slid into Serie C1. They won their way out of C1 the next year, and returned to Serie A for the 1988–89 season after four years of fighting it out in Serie B.

They did not remain long, however, being relegated in 1991 and returning to Serie C1 in 1993. The club returned to Serie A for 1996. Two years later, Bologna tasted a slice of success on the European stage, winning the UEFA Intertoto Cup and playing in the UEFA Cup. The club remained in Serie A until the 2004–05 campaign, losing to Parma in the playoffs.

==== Serie B ====
Despite losing some key players, Bologna expected to be challenging strongly for promotion from Serie B in the 2005–06 campaign. Despite its ambition, however, Bologna had a poor start to the season, causing the sacking of experienced coach Renzo Ulivieri, replaced by former Internazionale defender Andrea Mandorlini.

During this time, the team was sold by Giuseppe Gazzoni Frascara to Alfredo Cazzola, a local entrepreneur. Mandorlini, however, was not either able to bring Bologna up the Serie B table, and was fired on 5 March 2006; Ulivieri was then appointed back as team coach, after having been sacked a few months before. Bologna ended the 2005–06 Serie B campaign in eighth place. In the 2006–07 season, Bologna ended with the seventh place: there were several clashes between chair Cazzola and head coach Ulivieri, who was ultimately fired on 14 April 2007 and replaced by caretaker and former assistant coach Luca Cecconi. For the 2007–08 season, Bologna was led by Daniele Arrigoni, who helped the rossoblù achieve automatic promotion back to the top flight after finishing second in Serie B.

==== Serie A ====
During the summer of 2008, a club takeover was agreed between Cazzola and an American-based consortium; this was, however, cancelled in the end, following disagreements between the parties, and the club was successively sold to a local group led by new chair Francesca Menarini, who thus became the second female chair in the whole Serie A. Arrigoni was confirmed as head coach by the new group, and the start appeared to be particularly impressive, with a surprising 2–1 win at San Siro against Milan thanks to a winning goal scored by Francesco Valiani. The next weeks saw Bologna struggling in the league, however, with eight losses in nine matches. A disappointing 5–1 loss to Cagliari ultimately led the club management to sack Daniele Arrigoni on 3 November 2008 and appoint Siniša Mihajlović as new rossoblù boss.

On 14 April 2009, Giuseppe Papadopulo was appointed as the new manager, and successfully managed to raise the team spirit avoiding relegation to Serie B only in the last match of the season. In the 2009–10 season, Bologna played in Serie A for the 65th time, and escaped relegation again despite financial issues under new head coach Franco Colomba.

In June 2010, a club takeover was completed, with the club being sold by the Menarini family to Sardinian entrepreneur Sergio Porcedda. Franco Colomba was sacked right before the 2010–11 season opener on 29 August 2010, despite surviving relegation with the team in the 2009–10 season. The president of the club, Sergio Porcedda, said that the decision was made mostly "because he [Colomba] was skeptical of the team."

=== The consortium "Bologna 2010" ===
On 23 December 2010, the consortium Bologna 2010 led by banker Giovanni Consorte and coffee businessman Massimo Zanetti acquired the club from Sergio Porcedda, after the latter failed to pay wages for the club during his short-tenured ownership and put Bologna in threat of bankruptcy. The company also owed agent fee to Leonardo Corsi in the Andrea Raggi's transfer. Zanetti also became the new club chair, with popular Italian musician and long-time Bologna supporter Gianni Morandi appointed as honorary president.

On 21 January 2011, chair Massimo Zanetti and CEO Luca Baraldi, after only 28 days, resigned because of irreconcilable differences with the other personal and financial partners. Stefano Pedrelli became the new director general. For 76 days, the chair was Marco Pavignani.

From 7 April 2011, after the resignation of Pavignani and having paid €2.5m of capital increase, the new chair was Albano Guaraldi, the second largest shareholder of the consortium "Bologna 2010" with the 17% of the quotas, behind the outgoing Zanetti.

The 2013–14 season saw Bologna once again relegated to the Serie B, and also gave light to a number of financial problems involving the club and its ownership of Albino Guaraldi, who was considerably criticized by the team supporters also for a number of controversial decisions, including the sale of star player Alessandro Diamanti to Chinese club Guangzhou Evergrande. A new head coach was then found in former Cagliari boss Diego López for the new season, whereas Guaraldi clearly stated his intention to hand over his Bologna stakes to a new owner. A North American group headed by Joe Tacopina and Joey Saputo (owner of CF Montréal, also the team of former Bologna hero Marco Di Vaio) then stated its interest in acquiring the club; this was followed by another offer coming from former chair Massimo Zanetti. On 15 October 2014, the board of directors ratified the sale of the club to BFC 1909 Lux SPV, and Tacopina became the new club chair.

=== The Saputo era ===
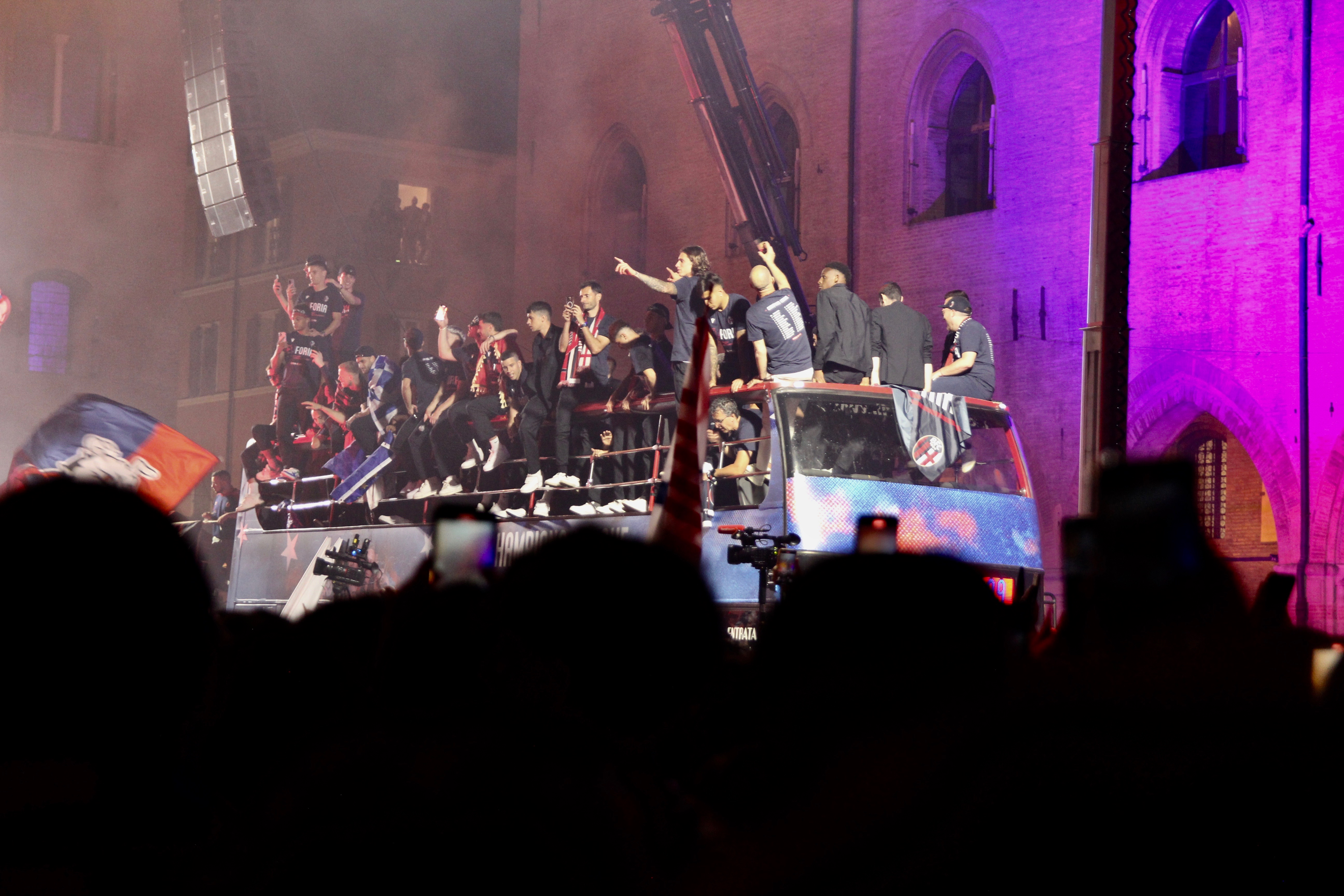
Bologna FC players celebrating the club's qualification for the 2024–25 UEFA Champions League in May 2024

Under the new ownership of which BFC 1909 Lux Spv S.A. of Luxemburg is an intermediate holding company, Bologna was promoted back to Serie A in 2015. Saputo also succeeded Tacopina as the new chair of the board of directors of Bologna on 17 November 2014.

In their first season back in Serie A, Bologna finished 14th avoiding relegation. In the following two seasons, Bologna finished in 15th place on the table. In the 2018–19 Serie A season, Bologna finished in a creditable 10th position on the table. Over the next three seasons, Bologna continued to finish mid table in Serie A coming 12th two campaigns in a row followed by a 13th-placed finish in the 2021–22 season.

On 12 September 2022, Thiago Motta was named as head coach of Bologna. Subsequently, the club concluded in 9th place in the 2022–23 season, accruing 54 points, setting a new record for the team. Under Motta's full-season leadership in the following 2023–24 season, the club secured a UEFA Champions League berth for the first time since 1964–65, ensuring a top-five finish in Serie A, and eventually establishing a new record of 68 points.

Motta was succeeded by Vincenzo Italiano ahead of the 2024–25 season. Bologna had one win, three draws and four losses in their Champions League campaign, ultimately finishing 28th out of 36 in the league phase. On 14 May 2025, Bologna won their third Coppa Italia—their first since 1974—after defeating Milan 1–0 in the final.

== Stadium ==
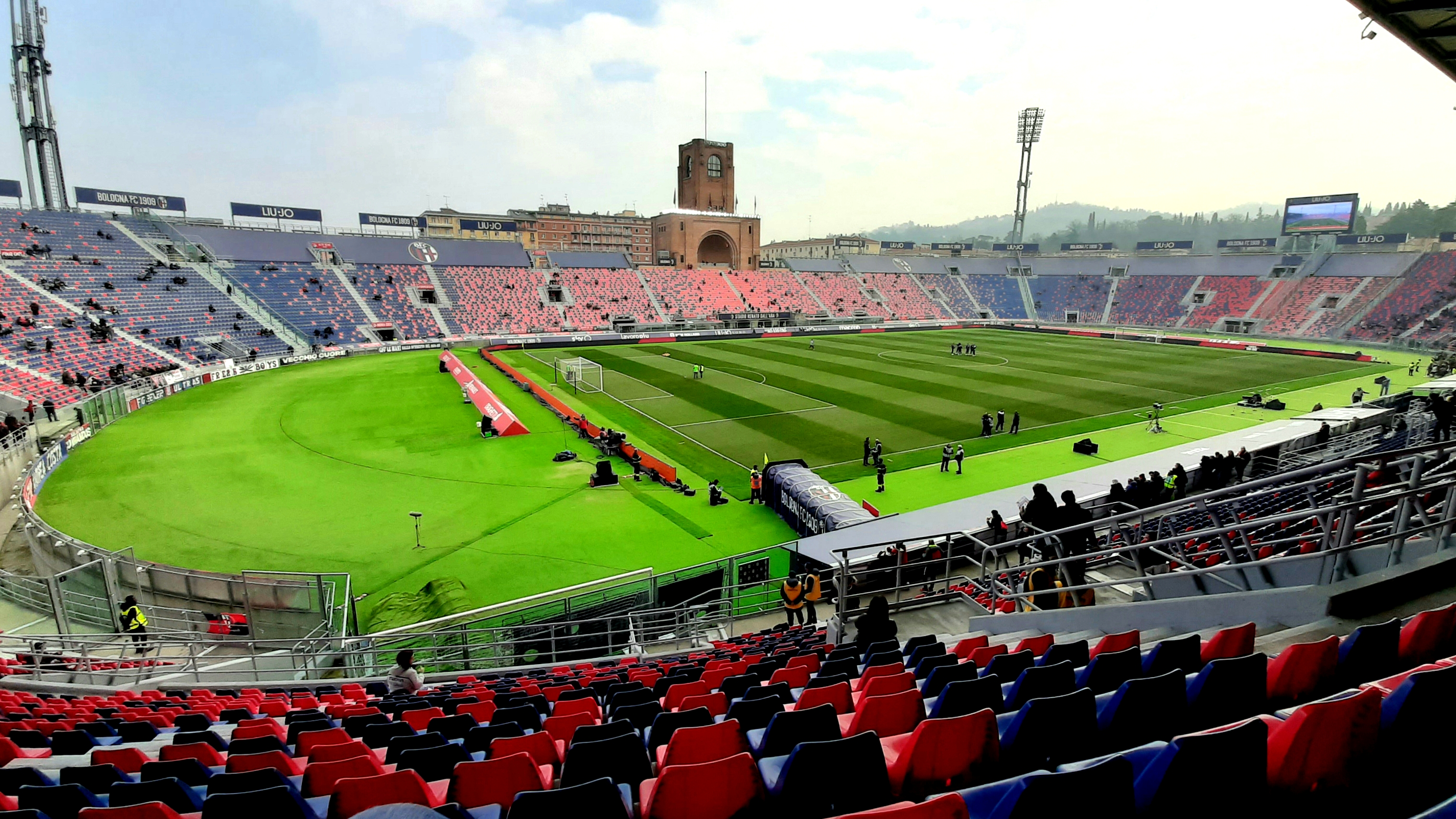
Stadio Renato Dall'Ara

The official stadium of Bologna is the Stadio Renato Dall'Ara. Dall'Ara is the biggest sports building of Bologna and its name is taken from an ex-chair of the club, Renato Dall'Ara, who died three days before the final for Serie A's Scudetto. Its capacity is 38,500. The curva Bulgarelli (in English, Bulgarelli stand), the stand of Bologna's ultras, is dedicated to player Giacomo Bulgarelli, who died on 21 February 2009. The other stand, part of which is reserved for the away fans, is dedicated to Árpád Weisz, coach of Bologna's winning pre-war team, and killed by the Nazis in a concentration camp during WWII.

== Players ==
=== Current squad ===
As of 8 October 2026

Note: Flags indicate national team as defined under FIFA eligibility rules; some limited exceptions apply. Players may hold more than one non-FIFA nationality.

| No. | Pos. | Nation | Player |
|---|---|---|---|
| 1 | GK | POL | Łukasz Skorupski |
| 2 | DF | SWE | Emil Holm |
| 3 | DF | BEL | Arthur Theate (on loan from Eintracht Frankfurt) |
| 4 | MF | ITA | Tommaso Pobega |
| 5 | DF | NOR | Eivind Helland |
| 6 | MF | CRO | Nikola Moro |
| 7 | FW | ITA | Riccardo Orsolini (3rd captain) |
| 8 | MF | ARG | Mikel Amondarain |
| 9 | FW | UKR | Artem Dovbyk (on loan from Roma) |
| 10 | MF | ITA | Federico Bernardeschi |
| 11 | FW | BEL | Samuel Mbangula (on loan from Werder Bremen) |
| 14 | DF | NOR | Torbjørn Heggem |
| 16 | DF | ITA | Nicolò Casale |
| 17 | MF | MAR | Oussama El Azzouzi |

| No. | Pos. | Nation | Player |
|---|---|---|---|
| 18 | MF | VEN | Marco Libra |
| 19 | MF | SCO | Lewis Ferguson (vice-captain) |
| 20 | DF | ITA | Nadir Zortea |
| 21 | MF | DEN | Jens Odgaard |
| 22 | FW | NED | Jay Enem |
| 23 | DF | NIG | Rahim Alhassane |
| 25 | GK | ITA | Massimo Pessina |
| 28 | FW | ITA | Nicolò Cambiaghi |
| 29 | DF | ITA | Lorenzo De Silvestri (captain) |
| 33 | DF | ESP | Juan Miranda |
| 36 | DF | ITA | Matteo Darmian |
| 41 | DF | CZE | Martin Vitík |
| 77 | GK | FIN | Ukko Happonen |
| 91 | FW | ITA | Roberto Piccoli (on loan from Fiorentina) |

=== Out on loan ===
As of 1 September 2026

Note: Flags indicate national team as defined under FIFA eligibility rules; some limited exceptions apply. Players may hold more than one non-FIFA nationality.

| No. | Pos. | Nation | Player |
|---|---|---|---|
| — | GK | ITA | Nicola Bagnolini (at Gubbio until 30 June 2027) |
| — | GK | CHI | Thomas Gillier (at CF Montréal until 30 December 2027) |
| — | GK | ITA | Francesco Raffaelli (at Alcione Milano until 30 June 2027) |
| — | DF | ITA | Wisdom Amey (at Frosinone until 30 June 2027) |
| — | DF | ITA | Tommaso Corazza (at Vicenza until 30 June 2027) |
| — | DF | SRB | Mihajlo Ilić (at Cesena until 30 June 2027) |
| — | DF | BUL | Dimitar Papazov (at Perugia until 30 June 2027) |
| — | DF | URU | Joaquín Sosa (at Colo-Colo until 30 June 2027) |
| — | DF | ITA | Riccardo Stivanello (at Südtirol until 30 June 2027) |
| — | DF | MNE | Bodin Tomašević (at Mantova until 30 June 2027) |
| — | MF | ITA | Federico Cassa (at Catanzaro until 30 June 2027) |
| — | MF | CAN | Antoine N'Diaye (at Casarano until 30 June 2027) |

| No. | Pos. | Nation | Player |
|---|---|---|---|
| — | MF | ITA | Lorenzo Menegazzo (at Lumezzane until 30 June 2027) |
| — | MF | FIN | Niklas Pyyhtiä (at Sudtirol until 30 June 2027) |
| — | FW | ITA | Gennaro Anatriello (at Lumezzane until 30 June 2027) |
| — | FW | ITA | Luigi Caccavo (at Juve Stabia until 30 June 2027) |
| — | FW | NED | Thijs Dallinga (at 1. FC Köln until 30 June 2027) |
| — | FW | ARG | Benja Domínguez (at Sassuolo until 30 June 2027) |
| — | FW | ITA | Flavio Ferrari (at Ostiamare until 30 June 2027) |
| — | FW | ITA | Tommaso Ebone (at Lumezzane until 30 June 2027) |
| — | FW | SWE | Jesper Karlsson (at Servette until 30 June 2027) |
| — | FW | ITA | Antonio Raimondo (at Frosinone until 30 June 2027) |
| — | FW | ENG | Jonathan Rowe (at Atalanta until 30 June 2027) |

== President history ==
Bologna have had numerous president over the course of their history, some of which have been the owners of the club, others have been honorary chairs. Here is a complete list of Bologna president from 1909 until the present day.

| Name | Years |
|---|---|
| Louis Rauch | 1909–10 |
| Pio Borghesani | 1910 |
| Emilio Arnstein | 1910 |
| Domenico Gori | 1910–12 |
| Rodolfo Minelli | 1912–15 |
| Arturo Gazzoni (Honorary chair) | 1916–18 |
| Rodolfo Minelli | 1918–19 |
| Cesare Medica | 1919–21 |
| Angelo Sbarberi | 1921–22 |
| Antonio Turri | 1922 |
| Ruggero Murè (Honorary chair) | 1923 |
| Enrico Masetti | 1923–25 |
| Paolo Graziani | 1925–28 |
| Gianni Bonaveri | 1928–34 |
| Renato Dall'Ara | 1934–64 |
| Luigi Goldoni | 1964–68 |
| Raimondo Venturi | 1968–70 |

| Name | Years |
|---|---|
| Filippo Montanari | 1970–72 |
| Luciano Conti | 1972–79 |
| Tommaso Fabbretti | 1979–83 |
| Giuseppe Brizzi | 1983–85 |
| Luigi "Gino" Corioni | 1985–91 |
| Piero Gnudi | 1991–93 |
| Giuseppe Gazzoni Frascara | 1993–2002 (Honorary chair) |
| Renato Cipollini | 2002–05 |
| Alfredo Cazzola | 2005–08 |
| Francesca Menarini | 2008–10 |
| Sergio Porcedda | 2010 |
| Massimo Zanetti | 2010–11 |
| Marco Pavignani | 2011 |
| Albano Guaraldi | 2011–14 |
| Joe Tacopina | 2014–2015 |
| Joey Saputo | 2014–Present |

== Coaching staff ==
| Position | Name |
|---|---|
| Head coach | (Italy) Raffaele Palladino |
| Assistant coach | (Italy) Andrea Tarozzi |
| Athletic coach | (Serbia) Vladimir Čepzanović (Italy) Nicolò Prandelli (Italy) Paolo Aiello |
| Goalkeeping coach | (Germany) Max Urwantschky (Italy) Andrea Sentimenti |
| Match analyst | (Italy) Alfonso Lobascio (Italy) Marco Onnivello |
| Data analyst | (Germany) Umberto Tedesco |
| Opponent analyst | (Italy) Leonardo Scirpoli |
| Team manager | (Italy) Tommaso Fini |
| Social doctor | (Italy) Gianni Nanni (Italy) Giovanbattista Sisca (Italy) Luca Bini |
| Physiotherapist | (Italy) Luca Ghelli (Italy) Luca Govoni (Italy) Gianluca Scolaro (Italy) Simone Spelorzi (Spain) Juan Manuel Parafita |
| Kit manager | (Italy) Matteo Campagna (Italy) Nicola Capelli (Italy) Davide Nicolini |

== Coaching history ==
Bologna have had many coaches and, some seasons they have had co-coaches running the team. Here is a chronological list of them from 1920 onwards.

| Name | Years |
|---|---|
| Hermann Felsner | 1920–31 |
| Gyula Lelovics | 1931–32 |
| József Nagy | 1932 |
| Achille Gama | 1932–33 |
| Technical Commission; Pietro Genovesi; Bernardo Perin; Angelo Schiavio | 1933–34 |
| Lajos Kovács | 1934 |
| Árpád Weisz | 1934–38 |
| Hermann Felsner | 1938–42 |
| Mario Montesanto | 1942–43 |
| Alexander Popovic | 1945–46 |
| Technical Commission; Pietro Genovesi; Angelo Schiavio | 1946 |
| József Viola | 1946–47 |
| Gyula Lelovics | 1947–48 |
| Tony Cargnelli | 1948–49 |
| Edmund Crawford | 1950–51 |
| Raffaele Sansone | 1951 |
| Giuseppe Galluzzi | 1951–52 |
| Gyula Lelovics | 1952 |
| Giuseppe Viani | 1952–56 |
| Aldo Campatelli | 1956–57 |
| Ljubo Benčić | 1957 |
| György Sárosi | 1957–58 |
| Alfredo Foni | 1958–59 |
| Federico Allasio | 1959–61 |
| Fulvio Bernardini | 1961–65 |

| Name | Years |
|---|---|
| Manlio Scopigno | 1965 |
| Luis Carniglia | 1965–68 |
| Giuseppe Viani | 1968 |
| Cesarino Cervellati | 1968–69 |
| Oronzo Pugliese | 1969 |
| Edmondo Fabbri | 1969–72 |
| Oronzo Pugliese; Cesarino Cervellati | 1972 |
| Bruno Pesaola | 1972–76 |
| Gustavo Giagnoni | 1976–77 |
| Cesarino Cervellati | 1977 |
| Bruno Pesaola | 1977–79 |
| Marino Perani | 1979 |
| Cesarino Cervellati | 1979 |
| Marino Perani | 1979–80 |
| Luigi Radice | 1980–81 |
| Tarcisio Burgnich | 1981–82 |
| Francesco Liguori | 1982 |
| Alfredo Magni | 1982 |
| Paolo Carosi | 1982–83 |
| Cesarino Cervellati | 1983 |
| Giancarlo Cadé | 1983–84 |
| Nello Santin | 1984 |
| Bruno Pace | 1984–85 |
| Carlo Mazzone | 1985–86 |
| Vincenzo Guerini | 1 July 1986 – 4 May 1987 |
| Giovan Battista Fabbri | 1987 |
| Luigi Maifredi | 1 July 1987 – 30 June 1990 |
| Francesco Scoglio | 1990 |

| Name | Years |
|---|---|
| Luigi Radice | 1990–91 |
| Luigi Maifredi | 1991 |
| Nedo Sonetti | 1991–92 |
| Eugenio Bersellini | 1992–93 |
| Aldo Cerantola | 1993 |
| Romano Fogli | 1993 |
| Alberto Zaccheroni | 1993 |
| Edoardo Reja | 8 December 1993 – 30 June 1994 |
| Renzo Ulivieri | 1994–98 |
| Carlo Mazzone | 1 July 1998 – 30 June 1999 |
| Sergio Buso | 1999 |
| Francesco Guidolin | 1 July 1999 – 30 June 2003 |
| Carlo Mazzone | 1 July 2003 – 30 June 2005 |
| Renzo Ulivieri | 2005 |
| Andrea Mandorlini | 9 November 2005 – 5 March 2006 |
| Renzo Ulivieri | 2006–07 |
| Luca Cecconi | 2007 – 30 June 2007 |
| Daniele Arrigoni | 1 July 2007 – 3 November 2008 |
| Siniša Mihajlović | 3 November 2008 – 14 April 2009 |
| Giuseppe Papadopulo | 14 April 2009 – 20 October 2009 |
| Franco Colomba | 21 October 2009 – 29 August 2010 |
| Paolo Magnani (interim) | 29–31 Aug 2010 |
| Alberto Malesani | 1 September 2010 – 26 May 2011 |
| Pierpaolo Bisoli | 26 May 2011 – 4 October 2011 |
| Stefano Pioli | 4 October 2011 – 8 January 2014 |
| Davide Ballardini | 8 January 2014 – 30 June 2014 |
| Diego López | 1 July 2014 – 4 May 2015 |
| Delio Rossi | 4 May 2015 – 28 October 2015 |
| Roberto Donadoni | 28 October 2015 – 24 May 2018 |
| Filippo Inzaghi | 1 July 2018 – 28 January 2019 |
| Siniša Mihajlović | 28 January 2019 – 6 September 2022 |
| Luca Vigiani (interim) | 6–12 September 2022 |
| Thiago Motta | 12 September 2022 – 23 May 2024 |
| Vincenzo Italiano | 1 July 2024 –28 May 2026 |

== Sponsors ==
| Period | Kit Manufacturer | Shirt sponsor (main) | Shirt sponsor (secondary) | Shirt sponsor (back) | Shirt sponsor (sleeve) | Shorts sponsor |
|---|---|---|---|---|---|---|
| 1978–1979 | Admiral | None | None | None | None | None |
| 1979–1981 | Tepa Sport | None | None | None | None | None |
| 1981–1982 | Tepa Sport | Cucine Febal | None | None | None | None |
| 1982–1983 | Ennerre | Bertagni | None | None | None | None |
| 1983–1984 | Ennerre | Pasta Corticella | None | None | None | None |
| 1984–1985 | Ennerre | Deisa Ebano | None | None | None | None |
| 1985–1986 | Ennerre | Idrolitina | None | None | None | None |
| 1986–1988 | Ennerre | Segafredo Zanetti | None | None | None | None |
| 1988–1989 | Uhlsport | Segafredo Zanetti | None | None | None | None |
| 1989–1991 | Uhlsport | Mercatone Uno | None | None | None | None |
| 1991–1993 | Uhlsport | Sinudyne | None | None | None | None |
| 1993–1994 | Erreà | Buona Natura | None | None | None | None |
| 1994–1996 | Erreà | Carisbo | None | None | None | None |
| 1996–1997 | Diadora | Carisbo | None | None | None | None |
| 1997–2000 | Diadora | Granarolo | None | None | None | None |
| 2000–2001 | Umbro | Granarolo | None | None | None | None |
| 2001–2004 | Macron | Area Banca | None | None | None | None |
| 2004–2005 | Macron | Amica Chips | None | None | None | None |
| 2005–2006 | Macron | Europonteggi | None | None | None | None |
| 2006–2007 | Macron | Various (Note: None (Matchday 1-11 & 22-25) / Bologna Motor Show (12-15) / Woolrich (16-21) / Volvo (26-42)) | Officine Ortopediche Rizzoli | None | None | None |
| 2007–2008 | Macron | Joe Marmellata (Matchday 18-34) / Carisbo (35-42) | Cogei | None | None | None |
| 2008–2009 | Macron | Unipol | Cogei | None | None | None |
| 2009–2010 | Macron | BIGPoker.it | Cogei (Matchday 1-2) / Ceramica Serenissima (Home) (3-38) & Cerasarda (Away) (3-38) | None | None | None |
| 2010–2011 | Macron | Cerasarda (Matchday 1-5) / Ceramica Serenissima (Home) (5-38) & Cerasarda (Away) (5-38) | Ceramica Serenissima (Matchday 1-5) / Manila Grace (25-38) | None | None | None |
| 2011–2012 | Macron | New Generation Mobile | Ceramica Serenissima (Home) & Cir Manifatture Ceramiche (Away) | None | None | None |
| 2012–2013 | Macron | New Generation Mobile | Ceramica Serenissima | None | None | None |
| 2013–2014 | Macron | New Generation Mobile | None | None | None | None |
| 2014–2015 | Macron | New Generation Mobile | +energia | New Generation Mobile | None | CAME Cancelli Automatici |
| 2015–2018 | Macron | FAAC | None | Illumia | None | None |
| 2018–2019 | Macron | Liu Jo | None | Illumia | None | None |
| 2019–2020 | Macron | Liu Jo | None | Illumia | Lavoropiù | None |
| 2020–2022 | Macron | Facile Ristrutturare | Selenella | Illumia | Detersivi Scala | None |
| 2022–2023 | Macron | Cazoo | None | Selenella | Lavoropiù | None |
| 2023– | Macron | Saputo | None | Selenella | Lavoropiù | None |

== Statistics ==
Most appearances
| Rank | Player | Apps |
|---|---|---|
| 1 | Giacomo Bulgarelli | 488 |
| 2 | Tazio Roversi | 459 |
| 3 | Carlo Reguzzoni | 417 |
| 3 | Carlo Nervo | 417 |
| 5 | Marino Perani | 415 |
| 6 | Felice Gasperi | 405 |
| 7 | Franco Cresci | 404 |
| 8 | Franco Janich | 376 |
| 9 | Angelo Schiavio | 364 |
| 10 | Mario Gianni | 363 |

Most goals
| Rank | Player | Goals |
|---|---|---|
| 1 | Angelo Schiavio | 251 |
| 2 | Carlo Reguzzoni | 168 |
| 3 | Ezio Pascutti | 142 |
| 4 | Giuseppe Savoldi | 140 |
| 5 | Gino Cappello | 122 |
| 6 | Gino Pivatelli | 109 |
| 7 | Giuseppe Della Valle | 104 |
| 7 | Harald Nielsen | 104 |
| 9 | Bruno Maini | 101 |
| 10 | Ettore Puricelli | 96 |

== Honours ==
| Type | Competition | Titles | Seasons |
|---|---|---|---|
| Domestic | Serie A | 7 | 1924–25, 1928–29, 1935–36, 1936–37, 1938–39, 1940–41, 1963–64 |
| Domestic | Coppa Italia | 3 | 1969–70, 1973–74, 2024–25 |
| Domestic | Serie B | 2 | 1987–88, 1995–96 |
| Domestic | Serie C | 1 | 1994–95 |

=== Other Titles ===
- Mitropa Cup
  - Winners (3): 1932, 1934, 1961
- UEFA Intertoto Cup
  - Winners (1): 1998
- Anglo-Italian League Cup
  - Winners (1): 1970
- Tournoi de Paris
  - Winners (1): 1937

=== Friendly tournaments ===
- Nova Supersports Cup
  - Winners (1): 2001

== Divisional movements ==
| Series | Years | Last | Promotions | Relegations |
|---|---|---|---|---|
| A | 79 | 2025–26 | — | ▼4 (1982, 1991, 2005, 2014) |
| B | 12 | 2014–15 | ▲4 (1988, 1996, 2008, 2015) | ▼2 (1983, 1993) |
| C | 3 | 1994–95 | ▲2 (1984, 1995) | never |
94 years of professional football in Italy since 1929
Founding member of the Football League’s First Division in 1921

== See also ==
- Scudetto of the Pistols
