= History of Genoa CFC =

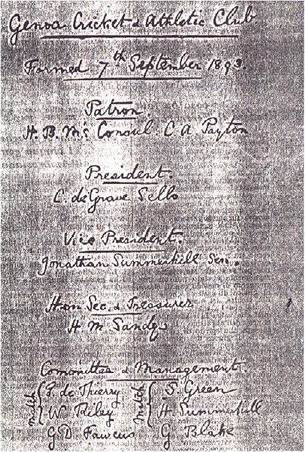
Founding constitution. Long thought to be lost this historical document was retrieved among the papers of renowned sports journalist Gianni Brera (himself a Genoa supporter) after his death and donated back to the club by his relatives.

The club was founded on 7 September 1893 as Genoa Cricket & Athletic Club. In its earliest years, they principally competed in athletics and cricket. Association football was secondly practised. Since the club was set up to represent England abroad, the original shirts worn by the organisation were white, the same colour as the England national team shirt. At first Italians were not permitted to join as it was a private club. Genoa's activities took place in the north-west of the city in the Campasso area, at the Piazza d'Armi. The men who initially dealt the management of the club were;

- Charles De Grave Sells
- S. Blake
- G. Green
- W. Riley

- Daniel G. Fawcus
- Sandys
- E. De Thierry
- Jonathan Summerhill Sr.

- Jonathan Summerhill Jr.
- Sir Charles Alfred Payton

On 10 April 1897 the footballing section of the club, already existing from 1893, became predominant thanks to James Richardson Spensley. It was amongst the oldest in Italian football as at the time, the only other founded clubs were four in Turin. Italians were allowed to join and they found a new ground in the form of Ponte Carrega. The first friendly match took place at home, against a mixed team of Internazionale Torino and FBC Torinese; Genoa lost 1–0. Not long after, Genoa recorded their first victory away against UPS Alessandria winning 2–0. Friendly games also took place against various British sailors such as those from HMS Revenge.

== Historical outline ==
=== Championship dominance ===
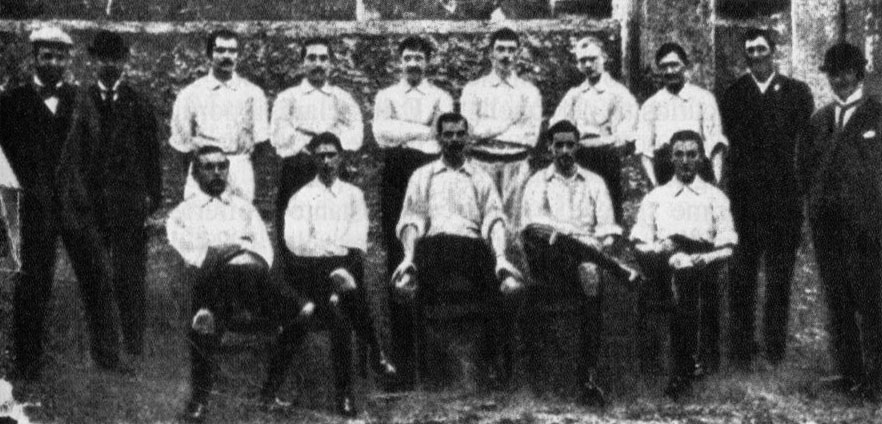
Genoa CAC in 1898, the first ever Italian Championship winners.

Football in Italy stepped up a level with the creation of the Italian Football Federation and the Italian Football Championship. Genoa competed in the first Italian Championship in 1898 at Velodromo Umberto I in Turin. They defeated Ginnastica Torino 2–1 in their first official game on 8 May, before winning the first championship later that day by beating Internazionale Torino 3–1 after extra time.

Genoa returned for the following season, this time with a few changes; the name of the club was altered to Genoa Cricket & Football Club, dropping the Athletic from its name. A change in shirt colour was also in order, as they changed to white and blue vertical stripes; known in Italy as biancoblu. Genoa won their second title on 16 April 1899, by beating Internazionale Torino 3–1 for the second time. On their way to winning their third consecutive title in 1900 and proving their championship dominance, Genoa beat local rivals Sampierdarenese 7–0; a winning margin which would not be bettered by any team in the league until 1910. The final was secured with a 3–1 win over FBC Torinese.

The club strip was changed again in 1901, Genoa adopted its famous red-navy halves and therefore became known as the rossoblu; these are the colours used even to this day. After a season of finishing runners-up to Milan Cricket and Football Club, things were back on track in 1902 with their fourth title. Juventus emerged as serious contenders to Genoa's throne from 1903 onwards, when for two consecutive seasons Genoa beat the Old Lady in the national final.

Notably Genoa became the first Italian football team to play an international match, when they visited France on 27 April 1903 to play FVC Nice, winning the fixture 3–0. As well as winning the Italian championship in 1904, the year was also notable for Genoa reserves winning the first ever II Categoria league season; a proto-Serie B under the top level. From 1905 onwards when they were runners-up, Genoa lost their foothold on the Italian championship; other clubs such as Juventus, Milan and Pro Vercelli stepped up.

The fall in part during this period can be traced back to 1908 when FIGC agreed to Federal Gymnastics protests forbidding the use of foreign players. Since Genoa's birth they had always had a strong English contingent. They disagreed, as did several other prominent clubs such as Milan, Torino and Firenze; as thus they withdrew from official FIGC competitions that year. The following season the federation reversed the decision and Genoa was rebuilt with players such as Luigi Ferraris and some from Switzerland. The rebuilding of the squad also saw the creation of a new ground in the Marassi area of Genoa; when built it had a capacity of 25,000 and was comparable to British stadiums of the time; it was officially opened on 22 January 1911.

=== Garbutt revival ===
With the introduction of the Italy national football team, Genoa played an important part, with the likes of Renzo De Vecchi; who was azzurri captain for some time, Edoardo Mariani and Enrico Sardi earning call-ups. Englishman William Garbutt was brought in as head coach to help revive the club; Garbutt was the first professional manager in Italy and he was considered to have a strong charisma, constantly smoking his tobacco pipe. He was dubbed "Mister" by the players; since then Italians have referred to coaches in general with the term.

Finally by 1914–15, Genoa had restored themselves as the top club from Northern Italy, winning the final round of the Northern section. However, a national final was not played because Genoa did not have an opposition; the finals of the Southern Italian section was not decided due to the outbreak of World War I. Genoa would be awarded the title in 1919 after the end of the war, it was their first for eleven seasons. The war took a harsh toll on Genoa as players Luigi Ferraris, Adolfo Gnecco, Carlo Marassi, Alberto Sussone and Claudio Casanova all died while on military duty in Italy; while footballing founder James Richardson Spensley was killed in Germany.

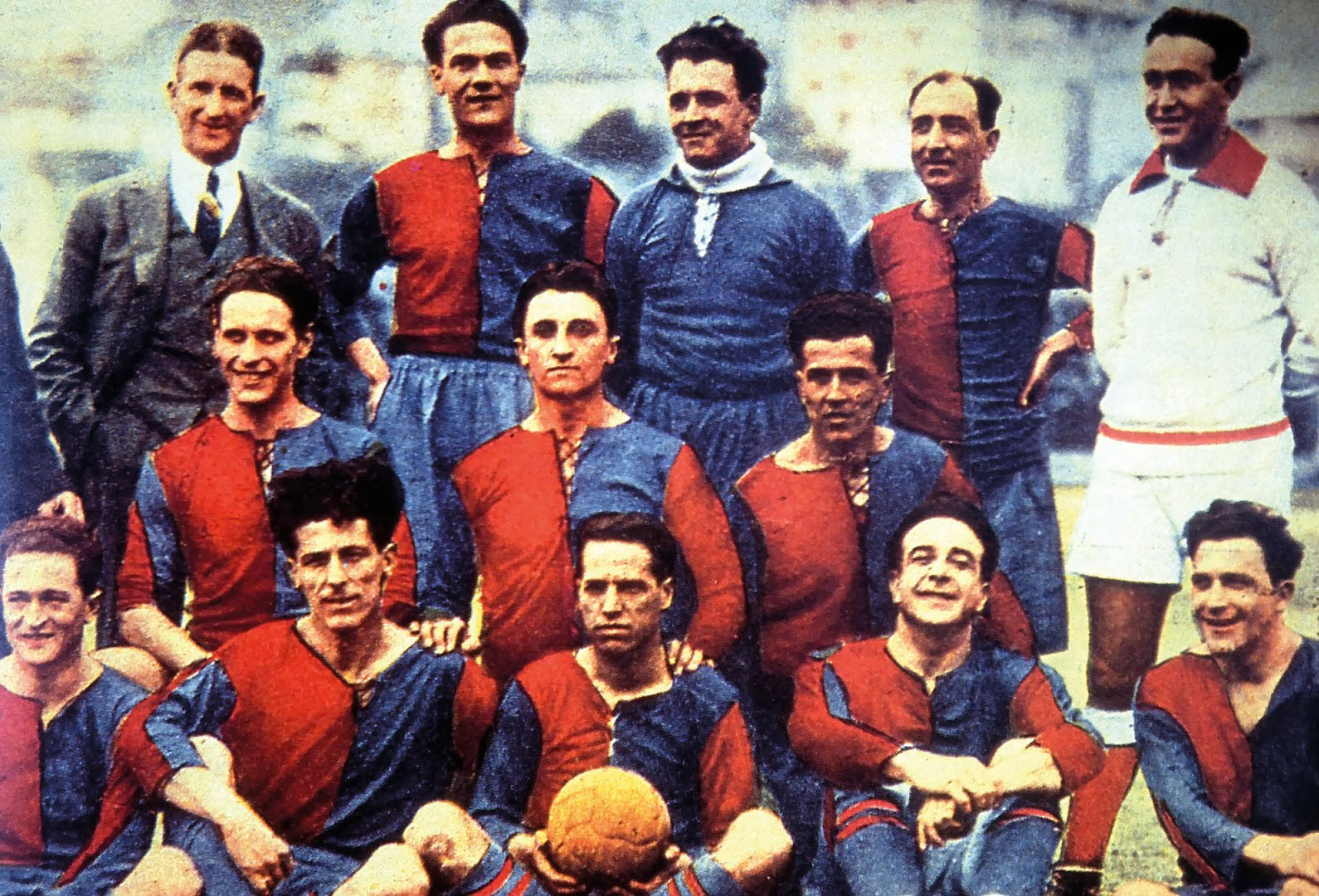
The last Genoa side to win the Italian Football Championship, in 1924.

Just after the war, Genoa remained a strong contender in the Northern section. Garbutt led Genoa to championship success in 1922–23 where they beat Lazio 6–1 in the final, over the course of two legs. The following season, Genoa made their way past Bologna in the Northern finals, but not without controversy; after riots in the second leg during the game in Bologna, the game was called off due to crowd rioting and FIGC awarded Genoa with a 2–0 victory. In the national final that season, Genoa beat Savoia 4-1 over the course of two legs; this would be their ninth and to date final Italian championship.

The squad during these two championship victories included; Giovanni De Prà, Ottavio Barbieri, Luigi Burlando and Renzo De Vecchi. With Genoa's championship victory in 1923–24 came the introduction of the scudetto patch; which means following the season which a club wins an Italian league championship, they are allowed to wear a shield shaped patch on their shirt which features the colours of the Italian flag. For the rest of the 1920s, the club did not win the championship, with the highest they were able to finish being second place, like in the 1927–28 season when they finished runners-up to Torino, with striker Felice Levratto scoring 20 goals in 27 games.

=== Genova 1893 period ===
Due to the strongly British connotations attached to the name, Genoa were forced to change it by the fascist government to Genova 1893 Circolo del Calcio in 1928. The club competed in a proto-European Cup in the form of the Mitropa Cup, where they went out in the quarter-finals after losing heavily to Rapid Vienna. They followed this with a runners-up position back at home in the league, they finished behind Ambrosiana in the 1929–30 season; this would be their last top level championship runners-up spot to date.

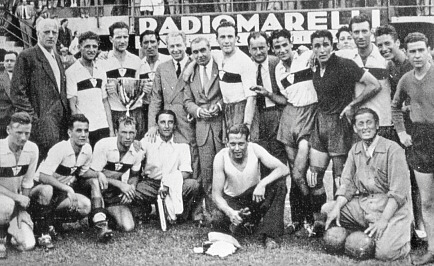
Genoa Coppa Italia winning side of 1937, celebrating in Florence.

The club's league form became highly erratic during the early 1930s, with varying league positions; it was during the 1933–34 season that Genova suffered their first ever relegation to Serie B, the second level of Italian football. Thankfully for the club, they were able to bounce back under the management of Vittorio Faroppa, winning promotion by finishing top of their group ahead of Novara. In 1936, the ambitious Juan Culiolo took over as president of the club; in 1936–37 they achieved a 6th-place finish and also won the Coppa Italia by beating AS Roma 1–0 with a goal from Mario Torti.

During the following season Genova finished in third place, this was a particularly tight season with winners Ambrosiana-Inter finishing only three points ahead of the club. That summer Italy competed in the 1938 FIFA World Cup and won, three Genova players formed part of the triumphant squad in the form of Sergio Bertoni, Mario Genta and Mario Perazzolo. The club finished the decade on a high, maintaining a top five foothold in the top level of the Italian league.

World War II affected dramatically the entire Italian football movement, but Genova did not recover as well as other clubs. In 1945, the club chose to revert their name to Genoa Cricket and Football Club, the one which they had used in the very early days of the Italian championship. In the years just after the war, the club were still popular with the fans, with people previously associated with the club such as Ottavio Barbieri and William Garbutt returning for managerial spells. Genoa also had a new rival in the form of Sampdoria, who were founded by a merger of two other clubs in 1946 and would groundshare at Stadio Luigi Ferraris.

=== Post-war period ===
Genoa side during 1956–57 season.

After the Second World War the ability of Genoa to finish in the upper ranks of Serie A declined in a significant manner; throughout the rest of the 1940s the club were middle-table finishers. The 1948–49 saw three highly significant results, Genoa beat Inter 4–1, the famous Grande Torino side 3–0 and Padova 7–1. The 1950s started in poor fashion for the club, they had bought Argentine Mario Boyé from Boca Juniors but he stayed only one season and the club were relegated after finishing bottom of the table, but after two seasons they achieved their return after winning Serie B, ahead of Legnano. Ragnar Nikolay Larsen was a noted player for the club during this period and they sustained mid-table finishes for the rest of the decade.

Despite suffering a relegation in 1959–60 and then a promotion back up to Serie A in 1961–62, Genoa had a respectable amount of cup success in the first half of the 1960s. The club won the Coppa delle Alpi in 1962; it was the first time the competition had been competed between club teams instead of international ones, the final was played at home while Genoa beat French club Grenoble Foot 38 by 1–0 with a goal from Nizza. Genoa won the same competition again two years later, the final was held at the Wankdorf Stadium in Bern, Switzerland; Genoa defeated Catania 2–0, with both goals from Giampaolo Piaceri to take the trophy.

The celebrations for the club did not last long however, as the year following their last cup success they were relegated down to Serie B again. This time their stay at the second tier of the Italian football system would be far longer than previous relegations, the club was unstable as it changed manager each season. Genoa even experienced their first relegation to Serie C in 1970, financially the club fell into difficulties and had several ownership changes.

=== Mixed times ===
Throughout the 1970s, Genoa would play the role of a yo-yo club, bouncing up and down between divisions. Under the management of Arturo Silvestri the club made its way back to Serie A for the 1973–74 season, but they were relegated straight back down. For the return of Il Grifone to Serie A a couple of seasons later, the squad featured the likes of Roberto Rosato, Bruno Conti and a young Roberto Pruzzo. This time they stuck it out in the top division for two seasons before succumbing to relegation in 1977–78; the relegation was particularly cruel as the side above them Fiorentina survived on goal-difference of just a single goal, the two teams had played each other on the final day of the season ending in a 0–0 draw.

First Genoa side of the 1980s.

The relegation was bad for the club in more ways than one, they lost some of their top players who could have offered them a swift return; such as Roberto Pruzzo's move to AS Roma where he would go on to have great success. After a couple of middle-table finishes in Serie B, Genoa earned promotion during the 1980–81 season under manager Luigi Simoni, the club finished as runners-up behind only AC Milan who had been relegated the previous season for their part in the Totonero betting scandal.

Still with Simoni at the helm as manager, Genoa were able to survive in Serie A for their returning season, they finished just one point ahead of the relegated AC Milan, it was a dramatic last day of the season as Genoa were trailing 2–1 to SSC Napoli with five minutes left, until on the 85th minute Mario Faccenda scored the goal which secured the point Genoa needed, starting a friendship between the two club's fans. A couple of seasons later in 1983–84 Genoa would not be so lucky, despite beating champions Juventus on the final day of the season, the club were relegated even though they finished the season with the same number of points as surviving Lazio; this was because Lazio had recorded better results in matches against Genoa.

=== European experience ===
The club was purchased by Calabrian entrepreneur Aldo Spinelli in 1985 and despite no longer having Simoni as manager, Genoa were finishing in the top half of Serie B. After a slip in form during 1987–88, Genoa refocused their energy and were able to achieve promotion back into Serie A the following season, finishing as champions ahead of Bari. Genoa achieved highs during the 1990–91 season where they finished fourth, remaining undefeated at home for the entire campaign, winning games against all the big sides including Juventus, Inter, AC Milan, Roma, Lazio, Fiorentina, SSC Napoli, as well as their hated local rivals Sampdoria who won the title that season.

Subsequently, the club gained entry to the UEFA Cup in the 1991–92 season, Genoa had a good run, making it to the semi-finals before getting knocked out by Ajax; notably Genoa did the double over Liverpool in the quarter-finals becoming the first Italian side to beat the reds at Anfield. Noted Genoa players during this period included Gianluca Signorini, Carlos Aguilera, Stefano Eranio, Roberto Onorati and John van 't Schip. Back in Serie A however, due to a limited roster of first-line players the team suffered heavily from the very success they enjoyed in the UEFA competition (which meant more matches to be played for the same athletes and fatiguing trips to Spain, Romania -twice-, England and the Netherlands), so Genoa finished just one place above the relegation zone; in the seasons following Genoa remained in the lower half of the table.

During the 1994–95 season Genoa were narrowly relegated, they finished level on points with Padova after the normal season period. This meant a relegation play-out was to be played between the two in Florence, the game was tied 1–1 at full-time and went to a penalty shootout, Genoa eventually lost the shoot-out 5–4. While back down in Serie B, the club had another taste of international cup success when they became the final winners of the Anglo-Italian Cup by beating Port Vale 5–2 with Gennaro Ruotolo scoring a hat-trick. Chairman Spinelli sold Genoa in 1997, moving onto Livorno. The late 1990s and early 2000s would be the most trying time in the history of the club, cwith constantly changing managers, a poor financial situation and little hope of gaining promotion, outside of a decent 6th-place finish in 1999–00. From 1997 until 2003, Genoa had a total of three different four different chairmen, before the club was passed on to Enrico Preziosi.

=== Recent times ===
After the take-over in 2003, things started to look up for Genoa; they won Serie B in 2004–05. However, allegations were raised that the club had fixed a match on the last day of the season between themselves and Venezia. The 3–2 victory in the match saw Genoa win the league, if they had lost they would have finished behind three other teams. The Disciplinary Committee of FIGC however saw fit to place Genoa bottom of the league and relegate them down to Serie C1 on 27 July 2005.

For their season in Serie C1 for 2005–06, Genoa were hit with a six-point penalty from the previous season. After leading for much of the season, they eventually finished as runners-up and were entered into the play-offs, beating Monza 3–0 on aggregate to achieve promotion back into Serie B. During the summer break Gian Piero Gasperini was brought in as the new manager, he helped the club to gain promotion during the 2006–07 season, it was ensured on the last day of the season where they drew 0–0 with Napoli, both sleeping giants were promoted back into Serie A.

In the recent 2008-2009 championship, Genoa started out with a defeat in the Sicilian away match with Catania. However, the team went on to finish at the top of the division.

Argentinian forward Diego Milito played with Genoa in the second division, and was then sold after the team had been relegated to third division. Milito returned to Genoa and played in Italy's Serie A. The red and blue genoese griffins finished fifth and secured a UEFA placement, whilst winning both derbies against the striped Sampdoria "cousins". They also managed to defeat teams such as Roma, Milan and Juventus. After winning against Juventus, they were beaten by Lazio and Bologna, preventing Genoa from reaching the Champions League. Having sold both Milito and midfield Thiago Motta to Inter, Genoa had 40 million euro to invest in suitable replacements for the next Serie A season.
