= List of Italian football champions =

- Scudetto
- Founded: 1898
- Country: Italy
- Confederation: UEFA
- Number of clubs: 20
- Current champions: Inter Milan (21st title) (2025–26)
- Most championships: Juventus (36 titles)
- Current: 2025–26 Serie A

The Italian football champions (Italian: Campione d'Italia di calcio, plural: Campioni) is a title competed for since 1898 in varying forms. The current format branded Serie A was launched in the 1929–30 season. Inter Milan are the current champions. Juventus have been Italian champions a record 36 times, including two titles won before the formation of Serie A in 1929. The Scudetto (Italian: scudetto, "little shield", plural: scudetti) is worn on the jersey of the club that won the Italian championship in the previous season, a tradition that began in 1924. The scudetto tradition started when Genoa won their ninth championship title and added a small shield to their team jersey to celebrate their championship win.

The first Italian Football Championship was a single day knock-out competition won by Genoa CFC. Numerous expansions and re-formats of what are recognised as official Italian Football Championship included re-brands to Prima Categoria from 1909–10 season, to Prima Divisione from 1921–22 season, and to Divisione Nazionale from 1926–27 season. Since the re-brand to Serie A from 1929, Serie A has been used as the Italian Football Championship for all but one season competitive Italian Football has been played. A regional based competition branded Divisione Nazionale was resurrected for the first season of football immediately after World War II.

== History ==
=== Campionato Italiano di Football ===
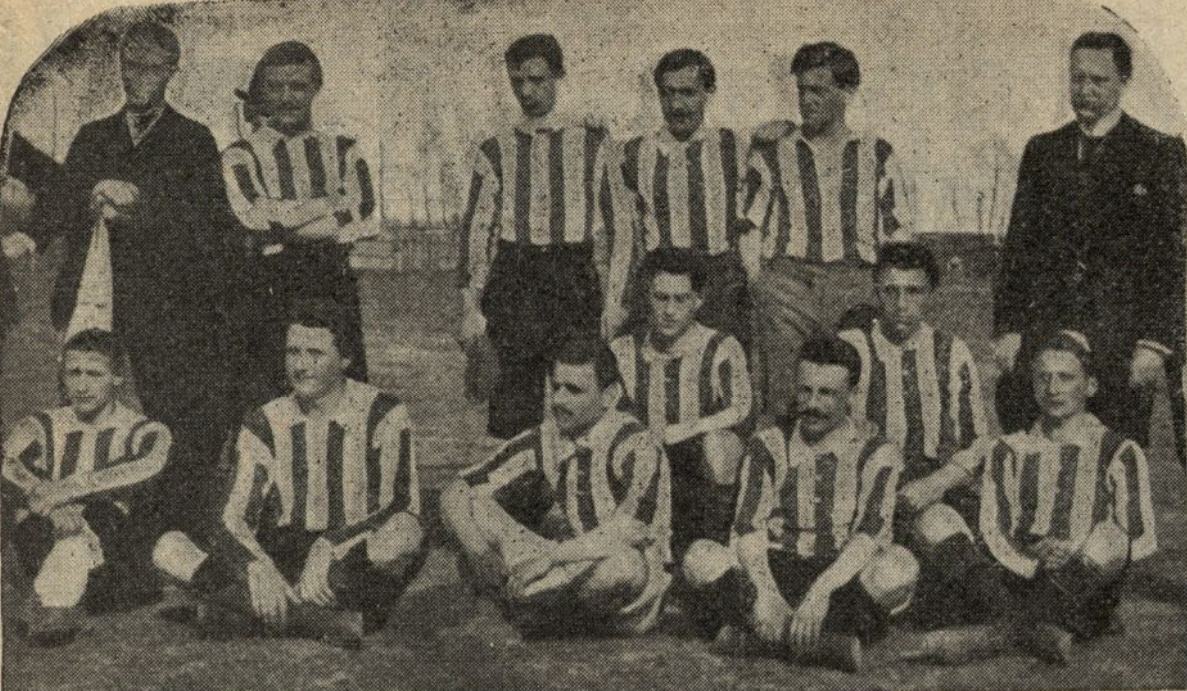
Juventus, 1903 runners-up

The first official national football tournament was organised in 1898 by the Italian Football Federation (Italian: Federazione Italiana Giuoco Calcio, FIGC). In the Italian football league system, the Federazione Italiana del Football (FIF), began organising football in Italy in 1898. Its first competition, the 1898 Italian Football Championship, was held at the Velodrome Humbert I in Turin on 8 May 1898. Genoa CFC won the tournament against three Turin based teams, defeating Internazionale F.C. Torino 2–1 after extra time in the final. Other Italian teams existed but hadn't joined at this stage. Genoa won the Italian Football Championship on five out of six occasions, interrupted by AC Milan in 1901.

=== Prima Categoria ===
From 1904, the championship was called Prima Categoria, structured into regional groups. The winners of each group participated in a playoff to declare the champions.

In November 1907, the FIF organised two championships in the same season:

1. Italian Championship, the main tournament where only Italian players were allowed to play; the winners would be proclaimed Campioni d'Italia (Italian Champions) and would be awarded the Coppa Buni
2. Federal Championship, a secondary tournament where foreign players (if they lived in Italy) were also allowed to play; the winners would be proclaimed Campioni Federali (Federal Champions) and would be awarded the Coppa Spensley

The FIF wanted to organize two championships in order to allow weaker clubs composed only of Italian players ("squadre pure italiane", "pure Italian teams") to win the national title, and to relegate simultaneously the big clubs composed mostly of stronger foreign players ("squadre spurie internazionali", "spurious international teams") in a minor competition for a "consolation prize". The majority of big clubs (Genoa, Torino and Milan) withdrew from both the championships in order to protest against the autarchical policy of the FIF. The Federal Championship was won by Juventus against Doria, while The Italian Championship 1908 and Coppa Buni were won by Pro Vercelli, beating Juventus, Doria and US Milanese. However, the Federal Championship won by Juventus was later forgotten by FIGC, due to the boycott made by the dissident clubs.

In the 1909 season, the two championships were organised again, with Coppa Oberti in lieu of Coppa Spensley for the Federal Championship. This time, the majority of big clubs decided to only withdraw from the Italian Championship in order to make the Federal competition the most relevant tournament, and to diminish the Italian one. The Federal Championship was won by Pro Vercelli, beating US Milanese in the Final, while the Italian Championship was won by Juventus, again beating US Milanese in the Final. However, the dissenters' strategy worked out: the failure of the Italian Championship won by Juventus forced the FIGC to later recognize the Federal Champions of Pro Vercelli as "Campioni d'Italia 1909", disavowing the other tournament.

The format was modified for the 1909–10 season which was played in a league format. Nine clubs participated, playing each other both home and away. The split between Federal and Italian championship was not completely abolished, because, while unifying these tournaments, it was decided for the last time to assign two titles at the end of the season, In fact, the FIGC established that the first placed club in the general classification would be proclaimed Federal Champions (now turned into the main title), while the best placed club among the four "pure Italian teams" would be recognized as Italian Champions (now the secondary title), depending on the head-to-head matches. At the end of the season, Pro Vercelli and Inter finished equal first, so a playoff was needed to assign the Federal title (the Italian one was won by Pro Vercelli). This season was the first victory for Internazionale, who defeated Pro Vercelli 10–3 in the final. Even the Italian title won by Pro Vercelli was later forgotten.

In the 1910–11 season, teams from Veneto and Emilia were admitted for the first time. The championship was divided into two groups: Liguria-Piemonte-Lombardia group, the most important, and the Veneto-Emilia group. The winners of each group qualified to the Final for the title. The 1912–13 season saw the competition nationalised with North and South divisions. The 1914–1915 Championship was suspended because of World War I while Genoa was first in the Northern Italy Finals and only when the war ended, in 1919, did the FIGC decide to award the 1915 title to Genoa. In 1916, Milan won the Coppa Federale, which for that season was a substitute for the championship, which had been suspended because of World War I. The tournament that year was limited to clubs from the north, with the exception of Pro Vercelli, but was not treated as an official trophy or recognised by the FIGC as an Italian title.

=== Prima Divisione ===
Controversy hit the Championship in the 1921–22 season which saw the major clubs (including Pro Vercelli, Bologna and Juventus) in dispute with the FIGC. The best 24 teams had asked for a reduction in clubs in the top division in accordance with a plan drawn up by Vittorio Pozzo, the Italy national team coach. Pozzo's plan was dismissed and the CCI (Italian: Confederazione Calcistica Italiana) was founded and organised a 1921–22 CCI league (Prima Divisione) to run concurrently with the 1921–22 season (Prima Categoria) organised by the FIGC. Therefore, that season saw two champions: Novese (FIGC) and Pro Vercelli (CCI). The schism ended when FIGC agreed to reduce the Northern Championship of 1922–23 to only 36 clubs ("Compromesso Colombo/Colombo compromise"); from the 1923–24 season the Northern Championship was reduced to 24 clubs divided into two groups.

=== Divisione Nazionale ===
The Carta di Viareggio/Viareggio charter (1926) was drawn up to legalise professionalism, ban foreign players, and rationalise the championship creating a new national top league where Northern and Southern teams would play in the same championship: Divisione Nazionale. 17 teams from Lega Nord (Northern League) were admitted to the new Championship along with 3 teams from Lega Sud (Southern League) for 20 teams, divided into two national groups of 10 teams each.

Further scandal followed in the 1926–27 season when title-winners Torino Football Club were stripped of their Scudetto following an FIGC investigation. A Torino official was found to have attempted to bribe opposing defender Luigi Allemandi in Torino's match against Juventus on 5 June 1927, and thus the season finished with no declared champions.

=== Serie A ===
In 1929 Divisione Nazionale (two groups of 16 teams each) split into two Championships: Divisione Nazionale Serie A (the new Top Division) and Divisione Nazionale Serie B (the new second level of Italian Football). The 1929–30 season was the inaugural Serie A season and was won by Internazionale (called Ambrosiana at the time). The next 11 years were also dominated by Juventus and Bologna, when all of the Scudetti were won between the three of them, Juventus winning five times in a row, a record equalled by Grande Torino in 1949, by Internazionale in 2010, and Juventus itself in 2016, until they won again the next season in 2017 to overtake the record at six league titles in a row. The competition was truncated as the Championship was suspended in 1943 due to World War II. A Championship was held in 1944, the Campionato Alta Italia, and won by Spezia. The title was officially recognised as a decoration by FIGC in 2002.

Spezia is authorized by the Italian Federation to exhibit a tricolour badge on the official jerseys which is unique, being the only permanent one in Italy.

The post-war years were dominated by a Torino side known as Il Grande Torino ("The Great Torino"), a team which found a dramatic end in the Superga air disaster in 1949. The 1950s saw the gradual emergence of Milan, with the help of Swedish striker Gunnar Nordahl, who was Serie A's leading scorer (Italian: Capocannonieri) for five out of six seasons. Juventus began to dominate throughout the 1970s and early 1980s with nine Scudetti in fifteen seasons while the 1990s saw Milan come to prominence.

Serie A was dealt another blow by the 2006 Calciopoli scandal, which involved the manipulation of referee appointments to favor certain clubs and implicated league champions Juventus, as well as other teams including Milan, Fiorentina, Lazio, and Reggina. The FIGC ruled Juventus be demoted in the last place, relegated to Serie B, and start the following season with a nine-point deduction. The other clubs involved suffered similarly with points deduction.

== Editions ==
=== Campionato Italiano di Football ===
| Season | Winners | Second place | Top scorer(s) (club) (goals) |
|---|---|---|---|
| 1898 | Genoa (1) | Internazionale Torino | (Unknown) |
| 1899 | Genoa (2) | Internazionale Torino | (Unknown) |
| 1900 | Genoa (3) | Torinese | (Unknown) |
| 1901 | Milan (1) | Genoa | (Italy) Umberto Malvano (Juventus) (4) |
| 1902 | Genoa (4) | Milan | (Unknown) |
| 1903 | Genoa (5) | Juventus | (Unknown) |

=== Prima Categoria ===
| Year | Winners | Second place | Third place | Top scorer(s) (club) (goals) |
|---|---|---|---|---|
| 1904 | Genoa (6) | Juventus | - | (Unknown) |
| 1905 | Juventus (1) | Genoa | US Milanese | (Unknown) |
| 1906 | Milan (2) | Juventus | Genoa | (Unknown) |
| 1907 | Milan (3) | Torino | Andrea Doria | (Unknown) |
| 1908 | Pro Vercelli (1) | US Milanese | Andrea Doria | (Unknown) |
| 1909 | Pro Vercelli (2) | US Milanese | Genoa | (Unknown) |
| 1909–10 | Internazionale (1) | Pro Vercelli | Juventus | (Unknown) |
| Season | Winners | Veneto-Emilia champions | | Top scorer(s) (club) (goals) |
| 1910–11 | Pro Vercelli (3) | Vicenza | - | (Unknown) |
| 1911–12 | Pro Vercelli (4) | Venezia | - | (Unknown) |
| Season | Winners | Central-southern Italy champions | | Top scorer(s) (club) (goals) |
| 1912–13 | Pro Vercelli (5) | Lazio | - | (Unknown) |
| 1913–14 | Casale (1) | Lazio | - | (Unknown) |
| 1914–15 | Genoa (7) | - | - | (Unknown) |
| 1915–19 | Cancelled due to First World War | | | |
| 1919–20 | Internazionale (2) | Livorno | - | (Unknown) |
| 1920–21 | Pro Vercelli (6) | Pisa | - | (Unknown) |
| Year | Winner | Second place | Third place | Top scorer(s) (club) (goals) |
| 1921–22 (FIGC) | Novese (1) | Sampierdarenese | - | (Unknown) |

=== Prima Divisione ===
| Season | Winners | Central-southern Italy champions | | Top scorer(s) (club) (goals) |
|---|---|---|---|---|
| 1921–22 (CCI) | Pro Vercelli (7) | Fortitudo Roma | - | (Unknown) |
| 1922–23 | Genoa (8) | Lazio | - | (Unknown) |
| 1923–24 | Genoa (9) | Savoia | - | (Austria) Heinrich Schönfeld (Torino) (22) |
| 1924–25 | Bologna (1) | Alba Trastevere | - | (Italy) Mario Magnozzi (Livorno) (19) |
| 1925–26 | Juventus (2) | Alba Trastevere | - | (Hungary) Ferenc Hirzer (Juventus) (35) |

=== Divisione Nazionale ===
| Season | Winners | Runners-up | Third place | Top scorer(s) (club) (goals) |
|---|---|---|---|---|
| 1926–27 | ~~Torino~~ | Bologna | Juventus | (Austria) Anton Powolny (Internazionale) (22) |
| 1927–28 | Torino (1) | Genoa | Alessandria | (Argentina) Julio Libonatti (Torino) (35) |
| Season | Winners | Second place | Third place | Top scorer(s) (club) (goals) |
| 1928–29 | Bologna (2) | Torino | - | (Italy) Gino Rossetti (Torino) (36) |

=== Serie A ===
Key
| † | Champions also won the Coppa Italia that season for a double |
| * | Champions also won the Coppa Italia and UEFA Champions League that season for a treble |
| † | Champions also won the European Cup/UEFA Champions League that season |
| ‡ | Champions also won the UEFA Cup/UEFA Europa League that season |
| # | Champions also won the UEFA Cup Winners' Cup that season |

| Season | Winners | Runners-up | Third place | Top scorer(s) (club) (goals) |
|---|---|---|---|---|
| 1929–30 | Ambrosiana-Inter (3) | Genoa | Juventus | (Italy) Giuseppe Meazza (Ambrosiana-Inter) (31) |
| 1930–31 | Juventus (3) | Roma | Bologna | (Italy) Rodolfo Volk (Roma) (29) |
| 1931–32 | Juventus (4) | Bologna | Roma | (Uruguay) Pedro Petrone (Fiorentina) (Italy) Angelo Schiavio (Bologna) (25) |
| 1932–33 | Juventus (5) | Ambrosiana-Inter | Bologna/Napoli | (Italy) Felice Placido Borel (Juventus) (29) |
| 1933–34 | Juventus (6) | Ambrosiana-Inter | Napoli | (Italy) Felice Placido Borel (Juventus) (31) |
| 1934–35 | Juventus (7) | Ambrosiana-Inter | Fiorentina | (Argentina) Enrico Guaita (Roma) (31) |
| 1935–36 | Bologna (3) | Roma | Torino | (Italy) Giuseppe Meazza (Ambrosiana-Inter) (25) |
| 1936–37 | Bologna (4) | Lazio | Torino | (Italy) Silvio Piola (Lazio) (21) |
| 1937–38 | Ambrosiana-Inter (4) | Juventus | Genoa | (Italy) Giuseppe Meazza (Ambrosiana-Inter) (20) |
| 1938–39 | Bologna (5) | Torino | Ambrosiana-Inter | (Italy) Aldo Boffi (Milan) (Uruguay) Ettore Puricelli (Bologna) (19) |
| 1939–40 | Ambrosiana-Inter (5) | Bologna | Juventus | (Italy) Aldo Boffi (Milan) (24) |
| 1940–41 | Bologna (6) | Ambrosiana-Inter | Milan | (Uruguay) Ettore Puricelli (Bologna) (22) |
| 1941–42 | Roma (1) | Torino | Venezia | (Italy) Aldo Boffi (Milan) (22) |
| 1942–43 | Torino (2)^{†} | Livorno | Juventus Cisitalia | (Italy) Silvio Piola (Lazio) (21) |
| 1944 | Campionato Alta Italia Spezia Calcio (decoration) | | | |
| 1945 | Canceled due to Second World War | | | |
| 1945–46 | Torino (3) | Juventus | Milan | (Italy) Guglielmo Gabetto (Torino) (22) |
| 1946–47 | Torino (4) | Juventus | Modena | (Italy) Valentino Mazzola (Torino) (29) |
| 1947–48 | Torino (5) | Milan/Juventus/Triestina | | (Italy) Giampiero Boniperti (Juventus) (27) |
| 1948–49 | Torino (6) | Internazionale | Milan | (Hungary) István Nyers (Internazionale) (26) |
| 1949–50 | Juventus (8) | Milan | Internazionale | (Sweden) Gunnar Nordahl (Milan) (35) |
| 1950–51 | Milan (4) | Internazionale | Juventus | (Sweden) Gunnar Nordahl (Milan) (34) |
| 1951–52 | Juventus (9) | Milan | Internazionale | (Denmark) John Hansen (Juventus) (30) |
| 1952–53 | Internazionale (6) | Juventus | Milan | (Sweden) Gunnar Nordahl (Milan) (26) |
| 1953–54 | Internazionale (7) | Juventus | Milan/Fiorentina | (Sweden) Gunnar Nordahl (Milan) (23) |
| 1954–55 | Milan (5) | Udinese | Roma | (Sweden) Gunnar Nordahl (Milan) (26) |
| 1955–56 | Fiorentina (1) | Milan | Internazionale/Lazio | (Italy) Gino Pivatelli (Bologna) (29) |
| 1956–57 | Milan (6) | Fiorentina | Lazio | (Brazil) Dino da Costa (Roma) (22) |
| 1957–58 | Juventus (10) | Fiorentina | Padova | (Wales) John Charles (Juventus) (28) |
| 1958–59 | Milan (7) | Fiorentina | Internazionale | (Argentina) Antonio Valentin Angelillo (Internazionale) (33) |
| 1959–60 | Juventus (11)^{†} | Fiorentina | Milan | (Argentina) Omar Sivori (Juventus) (28) |
| 1960–61 | Juventus (12) | Milan | Internazionale | (Italy) Sergio Brighenti (Sampdoria) (27) |
| 1961–62 | Milan (8) | Internazionale | Fiorentina | (Brazil) José Altafini (Milan) (Italy) Aurelio Milani (Fiorentina) (22) |
| 1962–63 | Internazionale (8) | Juventus | Milan | (Denmark) Harald Nielsen (Bologna) (Argentina) Pedro Manfredini (Roma) (19) |
| 1963–64 | Bologna (7) | Internazionale | Milan | (Denmark) Harald Nielsen (Bologna) (21) |
| 1964–65 | Internazionale (9)^{†} | Milan | Torino | (Italy) Sandro Mazzola (Internazionale) (Italy) Alberto Orlando (Fiorentina) (17) |
| 1965–66 | Internazionale (10) | Bologna | Napoli | (Italy) Luis Vinicio (Vicenza) (25) |
| 1966–67 | Juventus (13) | Internazionale | Bologna | (Italy) Gigi Riva (Cagliari) (18) |
| 1967–68 | Milan (9)^{#} | Napoli | Juventus | (Italy) Pierino Prati (Milan) (15) |
| 1968–69 | Fiorentina (2) | Cagliari | Milan | (Italy) Gigi Riva (Cagliari) (21) |
| 1969–70 | Cagliari (1) | Internazionale | Juventus | (Italy) Gigi Riva (Cagliari) (21) |
| 1970–71 | Internazionale (11) | Milan | Napoli | (Italy) Roberto Boninsegna (Internazionale) (24) |
| 1971–72 | Juventus (14) | Milan/Torino | | (Italy) Roberto Boninsegna (Internazionale) (22) |
| 1972–73 | Juventus (15) | Milan | Lazio | (Italy) Giuseppe Savoldi (Bologna) (Italy) Paolino Pulici (Torino) (Italy) Gianni Rivera (Milan) (17) |
| 1973–74 | Lazio (1) | Juventus | Napoli | (Italy) Giorgio Chinaglia (Lazio) (24) |
| 1974–75 | Juventus (16) | Napoli | Roma | (Italy) Paolino Pulici (Torino) (18) |
| 1975–76 | Torino (7) | Juventus | Milan | (Italy) Paolino Pulici (Torino) (21) |
| 1976–77 | Juventus (17)^{‡} | Torino | Fiorentina | (Italy) Francesco Graziani (Torino) (21) |
| 1977–78 | Juventus (18) | Vicenza/Torino | | (Italy) Paolo Rossi (Vicenza) (24) |
| 1978–79 | Milan (10) | Perugia | Juventus | (Italy) Bruno Giordano (Lazio) (19) |
| 1979–80 | Internazionale (12) | Juventus | Torino | (Italy) Roberto Bettega (Juventus) (16) |
| 1980–81 | Juventus (19) | Roma | Napoli | (Italy) Roberto Pruzzo (Roma) (18) |
| 1981–82 | Juventus (20) | Fiorentina | Roma | (Italy) Roberto Pruzzo (Roma) (15) |
| 1982–83 | Roma (2) | Juventus | Internazionale | (France) Michel Platini (Juventus) (16) |
| 1983–84 | Juventus (21)^{#} | Roma | Fiorentina | (France) Michel Platini (Juventus) (20) |
| 1984–85 | Hellas Verona (1) | Torino | Internazionale | (France) Michel Platini (Juventus) (18) |
| 1985–86 | Juventus (22) | Roma | Napoli | (Italy) Roberto Pruzzo (Roma) (19) |
| 1986–87 | Napoli (1)^{†} | Juventus | Internazionale | (Italy) Pietro Paolo Virdis (Milan) (17) |
| 1987–88 | Milan (11) | Napoli | Roma | (Argentina) Diego Maradona (Napoli) (15) |
| 1988–89 | Internazionale (13) | Napoli | Milan | (Italy) Aldo Serena (Internazionale) (22) |
| 1989–90 | Napoli (2) | Milan | Internazionale | (Netherlands) Marco van Basten (Milan) (19) |
| 1990–91 | Sampdoria (1) | Milan | Internazionale | (Italy) Gianluca Vialli (Sampdoria) (19) |
| 1991–92 | Milan (12) | Juventus | Torino | (Netherlands) Marco van Basten (Milan) (25) |
| 1992–93 | Milan (13) | Internazionale | Parma | (Italy) Giuseppe Signori (Lazio) (26) |
| 1993–94 | Milan (14)^{†} | Juventus | Lazio | (Italy) Giuseppe Signori (Lazio) (23) |
| 1994–95 | Juventus (23)^{†} | Parma | Lazio | (Argentina) Gabriel Batistuta (Fiorentina) (26) |
| 1995–96 | Milan (15) | Juventus | Lazio | (Italy) Igor Protti (Bari) (Italy) Giuseppe Signori (Lazio) (24) |
| 1996–97 | Juventus (24) | Parma | Internazionale | (Italy) Filippo Inzaghi (Atalanta) (24) |
| 1997–98 | Juventus (25) | Internazionale | Udinese | (Germany) Oliver Bierhoff (Udinese) (27) |
| 1998–99 | Milan (16) | Lazio | Fiorentina | (Brazil) Márcio Amoroso (Udinese) (22) |
| 1999–2000 | Lazio (2)^{†} | Juventus | Milan | (Ukraine) Andriy Shevchenko (Milan) (24) |
| 2000–01 | Roma (3) | Juventus | Lazio | (Argentina) Hernán Crespo (Lazio) (26) |
| 2001–02 | Juventus (26) | Roma | Internazionale | (France) David Trezeguet (Juventus) (Italy) Dario Hübner (Piacenza) (24) |
| 2002–03 | Juventus (27) | Internazionale | Milan | (Italy) Christian Vieri (Internazionale) (24) |
| 2003–04 | Milan (17) | Roma | Juventus | (Ukraine) Andriy Shevchenko (Milan) (24) |
| 2004–05 | ~~Juventus~~ | Milan | Inter | (Italy) Cristiano Lucarelli (Livorno) (24) |
| 2005–06 | Internazionale (14)^{†} | Roma | Milan | (Italy) Luca Toni (Fiorentina) (31) |
| 2006–07 | Internazionale (15) | Roma | Lazio | (Italy) Francesco Totti (Roma) (26) |
| 2007–08 | Internazionale (16) | Roma | Juventus | (Italy) Alessandro Del Piero (Juventus) (21) |
| 2008–09 | Internazionale (17) | Juventus | Milan | (Sweden) Zlatan Ibrahimović (Internazionale) (25) |
| 2009–10 | Internazionale (18)^{*} | Roma | Milan | (Italy) Antonio Di Natale (Udinese) (29) |
| 2010–11 | Milan (18) | Internazionale | Napoli | (Italy) Antonio Di Natale (Udinese) (28) |
| 2011–12 | Juventus (28) | Milan | Udinese | (Sweden) Zlatan Ibrahimović (Milan) (28) |
| 2012–13 | Juventus (29) | Napoli | Milan | (Uruguay) Edinson Cavani (Napoli) (29) |
| 2013–14 | Juventus (30) | Roma | Napoli | (Italy) Ciro Immobile (Torino) (22) |
| 2014–15 | Juventus (31)^{†} | Roma | Lazio | (Argentina) Mauro Icardi (Internazionale) (Italy) Luca Toni (Hellas Verona) (22) |
| 2015–16 | Juventus (32)^{†} | Napoli | Roma | (Argentina) Gonzalo Higuaín (Napoli) (36) |
| 2016–17 | Juventus (33)^{†} | Roma | Napoli | (Bosnia and Herzegovina) Edin Džeko (Roma) (29) |
| 2017–18 | Juventus (34)^{†} | Napoli | Roma | (Argentina) Mauro Icardi (Internazionale) (Italy) Ciro Immobile (Lazio) (29) |
| 2018–19 | Juventus (35) | Napoli | Atalanta | (Italy) Fabio Quagliarella (Sampdoria) (26) |
| 2019–20 | Juventus (36) | Internazionale | Atalanta | (Italy) Ciro Immobile (Lazio) (36) |
| 2020–21 | Internazionale (19) | Milan | Atalanta | (Portugal) Cristiano Ronaldo (Juventus) (29) |
| 2021–22 | Milan (19) | Internazionale | Napoli | (Italy) Ciro Immobile (Lazio) (27) |
| 2022–23 | Napoli (3) | Lazio | Internazionale | (Nigeria) Victor Osimhen (Napoli) (26) |
| 2023–24 | Internazionale (20) | Milan | Juventus | (Argentina) Lautaro Martínez (Internazionale) (24) |
| 2024–25 | Napoli (4) | Internazionale | Atalanta | (Italy) Mateo Retegui (Atalanta) (25) |
| 2025–26 | Internazionale (21)^{†} | Napoli | Roma | (Argentina) Lautaro Martínez (Internazionale) (17) |

== Performances ==
=== Clubs ===
The following table lists the performance of each club describing winners of the Championship. Sixteen clubs have been champions.

Bold indicates clubs currently playing in the top division.

| Club | Champions | Runners-up | Winning seasons |
|---|---|---|---|
| **Juventus** | 36 | 21 | 1905, 1925–26, 1930–31, 1931–32, 1932–33, 1933–34, 1934–35, 1949–50, 1951–52, 1957–58, 1959–60, 1960–61, 1966–67, 1971–72, 1972–73, 1974–75, 1976–77, 1977–78, 1980–81, 1981–82, 1983–84, 1985–86, 1994–95, 1996–97, 1997–98, 2001–02, 2002–03, ~~2004–05~~, (Note: Title was revoked and left unassigned through the courts following the Calciopoli Scandal.) 2011–12, 2012–13, 2013–14, 2014–15, 2015–16, 2016–17, 2017–18, 2018–19, 2019–20 |
| **Internazionale** | 21 | 17 | 1909–10, 1919–20, 1929–30, 1937–38, 1939–40, 1952–53, 1953–54, 1962–63, 1964–65, 1965–66, 1970–71, 1979–80, 1988–89, 2005–06, (Note: Title was put sub judice, then assigned to Inter Milan, through the courts following the Calciopoli Scandal.) 2006–07, 2007–08, 2008–09, 2009–10, 2020–21, 2023–24, 2025–26 |
| **Milan** | 19 | 17 | 1901, 1906, 1907, 1950–51, 1954–55, 1956–57, 1958–59, 1961–62, 1967–68, 1978–79, 1987–88, 1991–92, 1992–93, 1993–94, 1995–96, 1998–99, 2003–04, 2010–11, 2021–22 |
| **Genoa** | 9 | 4 | 1898, 1899, 1900, 1902, 1903, 1904, 1914–15, 1922–23, 1923–24 |
| **Torino** | 7 | 8 | ~~1926–27~~, (Note: Title was revoked and left unassigned due to the Allemandi match fixing scandal.) 1927–28, 1942–43, 1945–46, 1946–47, 1947–48, 1948–49, 1975–76 |
| **Bologna** | 7 | 4 | 1924–25, 1928–29, 1935–36, 1936–37, 1938–39, 1940–41, 1963–64 |
| Pro Vercelli | 7 | 1 | 1908, 1909, 1910–11, 1911–12, 1912–13, 1920–21, 1921–22 (CCI) |
| **Napoli** | 4 | 9 | 1986–87, 1989–90, 2022–23, 2024–25 |
| **Roma** | 3 | 14 | 1941–42, 1982–83, 2000–01 |
| **Lazio** | 2 | 6 | 1973–74, 1999–2000 |
| **Fiorentina** | 2 | 5 | 1955–56, 1968–69 |
| Casale | 1 | — | 1913–14 |
| Novese | 1 | — | 1921–22 (FIGC) |
| **Cagliari** | 1 | — | 1969–70 |
| Hellas Verona | 1 | — | 1984–85 |
| Sampdoria | 1 | — | 1990–91 |
| Alba Trastevere | — | 2 | |
| Internazionale Torino | — | 2 | |
| Livorno | — | 2 | |
| **Parma** | — | 2 | |
| US Milanese | — | 2 | |
| Vicenza | — | 2 | |
| Fortitudo Roma | — | 1 | |
| Perugia | — | 1 | |
| Pisa | — | 1 | |
| Sampierdarenese | — | 1 | |
| Savoia | — | 1 | |
| Torinese | — | 1 | |
| Triestina | — | 1 | |
| **Udinese** | — | 1 | |
| **Venezia** | — | 1 | |

Titles won by club (%)
1. Juventus – 36 (29.3%)
2. Internazionale – 21 (17.1%)
3. Milan – 19 (15.4%)
4. Genoa – 9 (7.32%)
5. Torino – 7 (5.69%)
6. Bologna – 7 (5.69%)
7. Pro Vercelli – 7 (5.69%)
8. Napoli – 4 (3.25%)
9. Roma – 3 (2.44%)
10. Fiorentina – 2 (1.63%)
11. Lazio – 2 (1.63%)
12. Casale – 1 (0.81%)
13. Novese – 1 (0.81%)
14. Cagliari – 1 (0.81%)
15. Hellas Verona – 1 (0.81%)
16. Sampdoria – 1 (0.81%)
Location of Italian football champions

=== By city ===
| City | Championships | Clubs |
|---|---|---|
| Turin | 43 | Juventus (36), Torino (7) |
| Milan | 40 | Internazionale (21), Milan (19) |
| Genoa | 10 | Genoa (9), Sampdoria (1) |
| Bologna | 7 | Bologna (7) |
| Vercelli | 7 | Pro Vercelli (7) |
| Rome | 5 | Roma (3), Lazio (2) |
| Naples | 4 | Napoli (4) |
| Florence | 2 | Fiorentina (2) |
| Cagliari | 1 | Cagliari (1) |
| Casale Monferrato | 1 | Casale (1) |
| Novi Ligure | 1 | Novese (1) |
| Verona | 1 | Hellas Verona (1) |

=== By region ===
| Region | Championships | Clubs |
|---|---|---|
| Piedmont | 52 | Juventus (36), Torino (7), Pro Vercelli (7), Casale (1), Novese (1) |
| Lombardy | 40 | Internazionale (21), Milan (19) |
| Liguria | 10 | Genoa (9), Sampdoria (1) |
| Emilia-Romagna | 7 | Bologna (7) |
| Lazio | 5 | Roma (3), Lazio (2) |
| Campania | 4 | Napoli (4) |
| Tuscany | 2 | Fiorentina (2) |
| Sardinia | 1 | Cagliari (1) |
| Veneto | 1 | Hellas Verona (1) |

== See also ==
- Football in Italy
- Italian football league system
- Capocannoniere, award for the top scorer in a Serie A season

== Sources ==
- Almanacco Illustrato del Calcio – La Storia 1898–2004, Panini Edizioni, Modena, September 2005
- Carlo Chiesa, La grande storia del calcio italiano (The great history of italian football), Guerin Sportivo, 2012–
  - Second installment: 1908–1910, pp. 17–32, in Guerin Sportivo #5 (maggio 2012), pp. 83–98.
