= History of the first football clubs in Italy =

Overview of the history of the first association football clubs in Italy

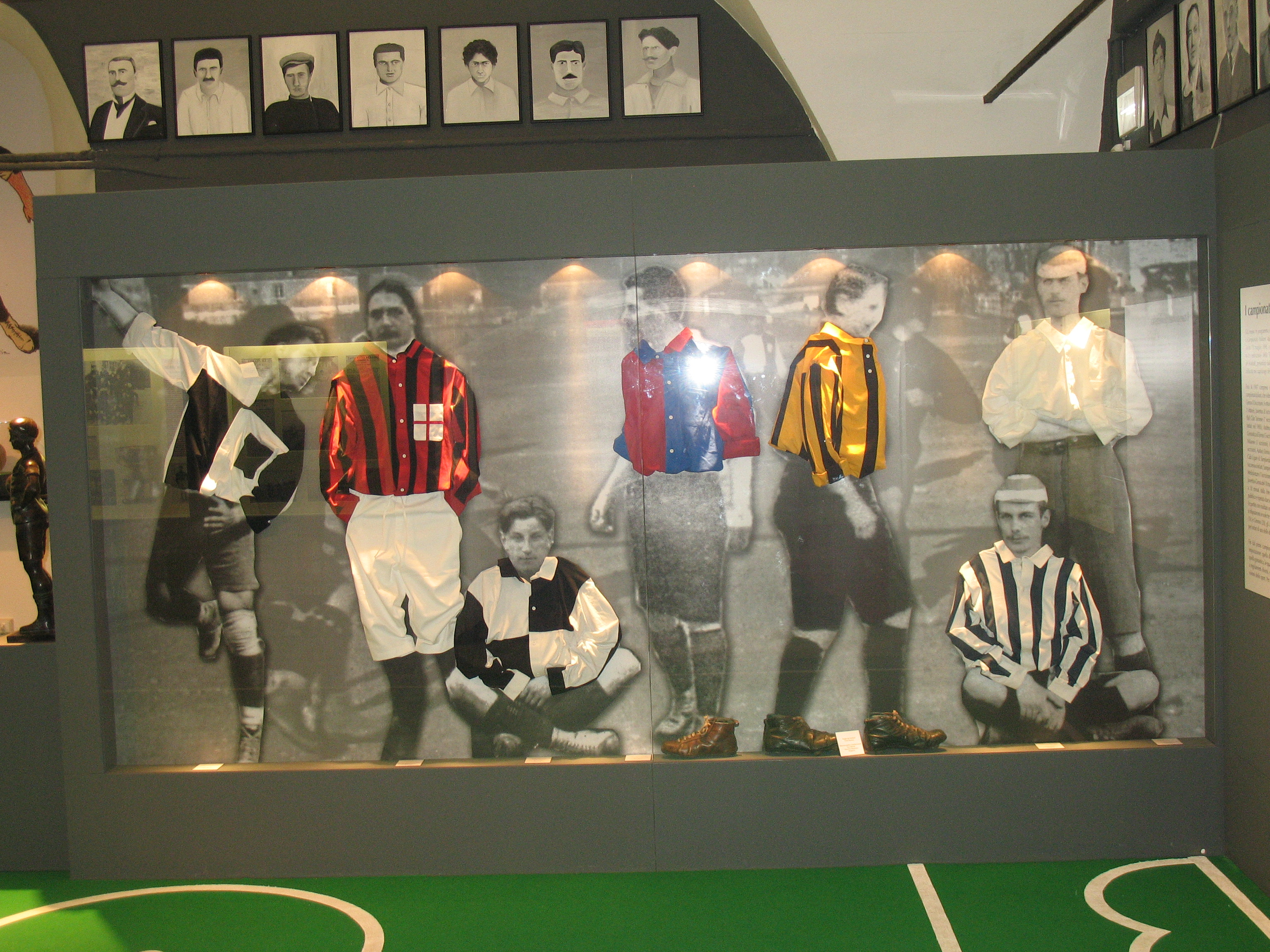
Overview of the first football clubs in Italy (from the Museum of the Genoa CFC).

This article compiles information about the history of the first football clubs in Italy. The practice of football in the country began in the late 19th century, with the founding of the first clubs, which played a key role in popularizing and organizing the sport. These clubs contributed to the development of the first official competitions and helped establish football as one of Italy's leading sports, reflecting cultural and social changes in the country.

== Historical context ==
Discussions about which Italian football clubs are the oldest are controversial due to the fact that some teams that were protagonists in the early days of modern football (in the country that includes distant versions of the ball game, such as calcio storico fiorentino) were founded as football sections of multi-sport clubs that provided separate sections for different disciplines (e.g. athletics, gymnastics, cycling, and cricket), or practiced the new sport within clubs before the formal creation of sections dedicated to football. In some cases, no football section was formed and the sport remained unofficial.

In addition, some of the first football events were the tournaments organized by the Italian National Gymnastics Federation (FGNI, later FGI), i.e. not a purely football organization. Gymnastics football, officially called "giuoco del calcio", had its origins in the city of Rovigo, where the professor of physical education Francesco Gabrielli began to promote it in 1893, and in Treviso, where the first edition of the Gare Nazionali dei Giuochi Ginnastici was held in 1896. The rules of gymnastic football, initially characterized by numerous peculiarities elaborated by Gabrielli himself, were gradually brought into line with the regulations established by the International Football Association Board (IFAB), until their complete adoption on May 6, 1903.

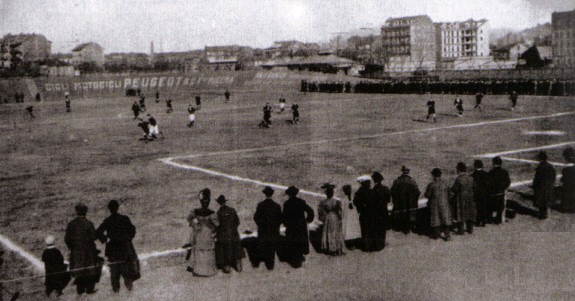
A match of the first Italian football championship recognized by the FIGC, played at the Velodrome Humbert I in Turin on May 8, 1898.

Although the Federazione Ginnastica thus had an older football tradition than the Federazione Italiana Giuoco Calcio, founded on March 26, 1898 as FIF (Federazione Italiana del Football), and the aforementioned events were originally considered official national championships, FIGC only recognized the tournaments it organized (the first of which was the 1898 Italian Football Championship won by the Genoa Cricket and Football Club), as well as the three First, Second and Third Division tournaments organized by the Italian Football Confederation (CCI) in the 1921-1922 season. However, FIF, which, unlike FGNI, adopted the full IFAB regulations from the outset, did not join the organization until 1913, when the newly formed Fédération Internationale de Football Association (FIFA) became a member. For this reason, the entire Italian football activity was technically born outside the IFAB, as was that of the entire world with the exception of the British Isles, an element that allowed the regulatory independence of the national federations (which in some cases has continued to exist).

This and other factors, such as the fact that some groups of sportsmen played football sporadically under the name of unregistered clubs, make it difficult to carry out a direct and definitive historical reconstruction to determine which was the first football team founded in Italy.

== Overview of the oldest teams ==
The following is a list of the football clubs or sections founded in Italy up to 1900, by region to which they belong, with particular reference to the regional capitals; however, if there are no clubs founded in the 19th century in a given region, the oldest teams in the area and its administrative center are listed.

If the sources do not indicate a different date, the creation of the football section of a club is considered to be contemporary with the creation of the club itself.

=== Teams from the Aosta Valley ===
It seems that in the 19th century in and around Aosta there was no team dedicated officially or unofficially to football. The earliest known team in the city, as well as in the whole Valley, was the football section of the Augusta Praetoria, founded in 1908 and disbanded in 1910. It should not be confused with the almost homonymous Augusta Praetoria Sports, an early incarnation of the Unione Sportiva Aosta (1911).

Further information on less recent football activity is scarce. The other most notable club in the area is Vallée d'Aoste of Saint-Christophe, which was founded in 1971.

=== Piedmontese teams ===
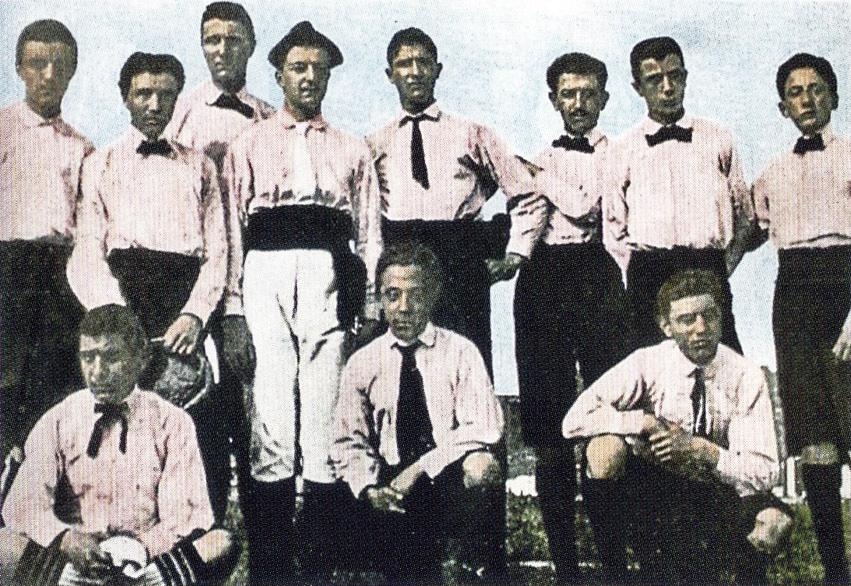
One of the first line-ups of Sport-Club Juventus in 1899.

In Turin, with the exception of the Reale Società Ginnastica di Torino (founded in 1844, but which did not establish its football section until 1897), the first club was the Torino Football & Cricket Club, founded in 1887. The Torino Football & Cricket Club then merged with the Nobili Torino (a club founded in 1889), to form Internazionale Torino in 1891. Also in the Piedmontese capital, the Foot-Ball Club Torinese was founded in 1894 as the football section of the Circolo Pattinatori Valentino 1874, (and became an autonomous club three years later), followed in 1897 by Unione Football (a little-known gymnastics team whose founding date is purely indicative), and Sport-Club Juventus, and in 1899 by Sport-Club Audace Torino.

Outside of Turin, the people of Alessandria were the most involved in football. According to some accounts, the sport was introduced to the people of Alessandria in 1891 by Edoardo Bosio, and in 1894 a match was played between a local team and Genoa. Later, in 1896, the Unione Pro Sport Alessandria was founded, and in 1898 another team, about which there is no further information, was formed. In the rest of Piedmont, the Società Ginnastica Pro Vercelli, founded in 1887, but whose section dedicated to football was founded in 1903, and the Società Ginnastica Pietro Micca of Biella, founded in 1899 under the name Società Ginnastica Biellese, which officially began playing football in 1902, are particularly noteworthy. Other clubs that practiced football, but exclusively in the context of gymnastics, were the Società Ginnastica Pro Novara, founded in 1881 as Società Ginnastica e Scherma Novara, the Società Ginnastica Forza e Virtù, founded in Novi Ligure in 1892, and the San Filippo Neri of Tortona, of uncertain date of foundation. In 1898, there are also reports of a match between gymnastic teams in Cuneo, and the foundation of the Unione Sportiva Trinese (fully active in football since 1919). Finally, in 1900, the Ivrea Sporting Club was founded, whose football team was formed in 1901.

=== Ligurian teams ===
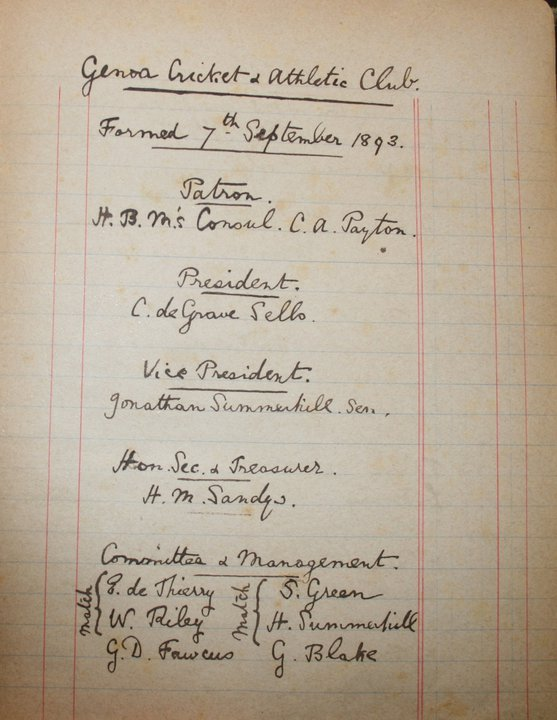
Act of foundation of Genoa CFC, September 7, 1893

In 1893, Genoa CFC was founded in Genoa, the oldest Italian football club still active and the one with the oldest founding document, although it was already active in 1890 without official status, using a pitch lent to the future Genoans by Wilson and McLaren, two Scottish industrialists. Also competing to represent the capital of Liguria at the time were the Società Ginnastica Andrea Doria, founded in 1895, with a football section founded in 1900, and two clubs from the Sampierdarena district (then an independent town, not yet incorporated into the capital): the Liguria Foot Ball Club, founded in 1897, and the Società Ginnastica Sampierdarenese, founded in 1891 but with a football section founded in 1899. The Società Ginnastica Ligure Cristoforo Colombo, founded in 1877, also established a football section, but not until 1907, while the Società Ginnastica Raffaele Rubattino, founded in 1894, did not establish a dedicated section until 1906. Similarly, the Unione Sportiva Sestri Ponente 1897, based in the Genoese suburb of the same name (an autonomous municipality at the time), founded a football section in the century following the one in question, which was later incorporated into the Fratellanza Sportiva Sestrese Calcio 1919, while the Società Ginnastica Nicolò Barabino, founded in 1897 in Sampierdarena, did not create a specific section for football.

Outside the context of Great Genoa, one finds the Fratellanza Ginnastica Savonese and the Unione Sportiva San Filippo Neri of Albenga, founded in 1883 and 1893 respectively, which did not develop the practice of football in an official capacity until the century following their foundation. The Fratellanza Ginnastica Savonese, in particular, founded its "games section" (Savona Calcio) in 1907, while the Società Ginnastica Pro Chiavari was also founded in 1893 and created its first "football section" in 1915, temporarily absorbing the Entella Foot-Ball Club.

=== Lombard teams ===
Milan's oldest football team was the Societa' per l'Educazione Fisica Mediolanum, founded in 1896 as Societa' Ginnastica Mediolanum, with its football section founded in 1898. The second team in the capital was the Milan Foot-Ball and Cricket Club, founded in 1899. Other old clubs that played football, albeit unofficially, were Forza e Coraggio, founded in 1870, and Pro Patria Società Ginnastica di Milano, founded in 1883, in addition to Pro Italia and Civici Pompieri.

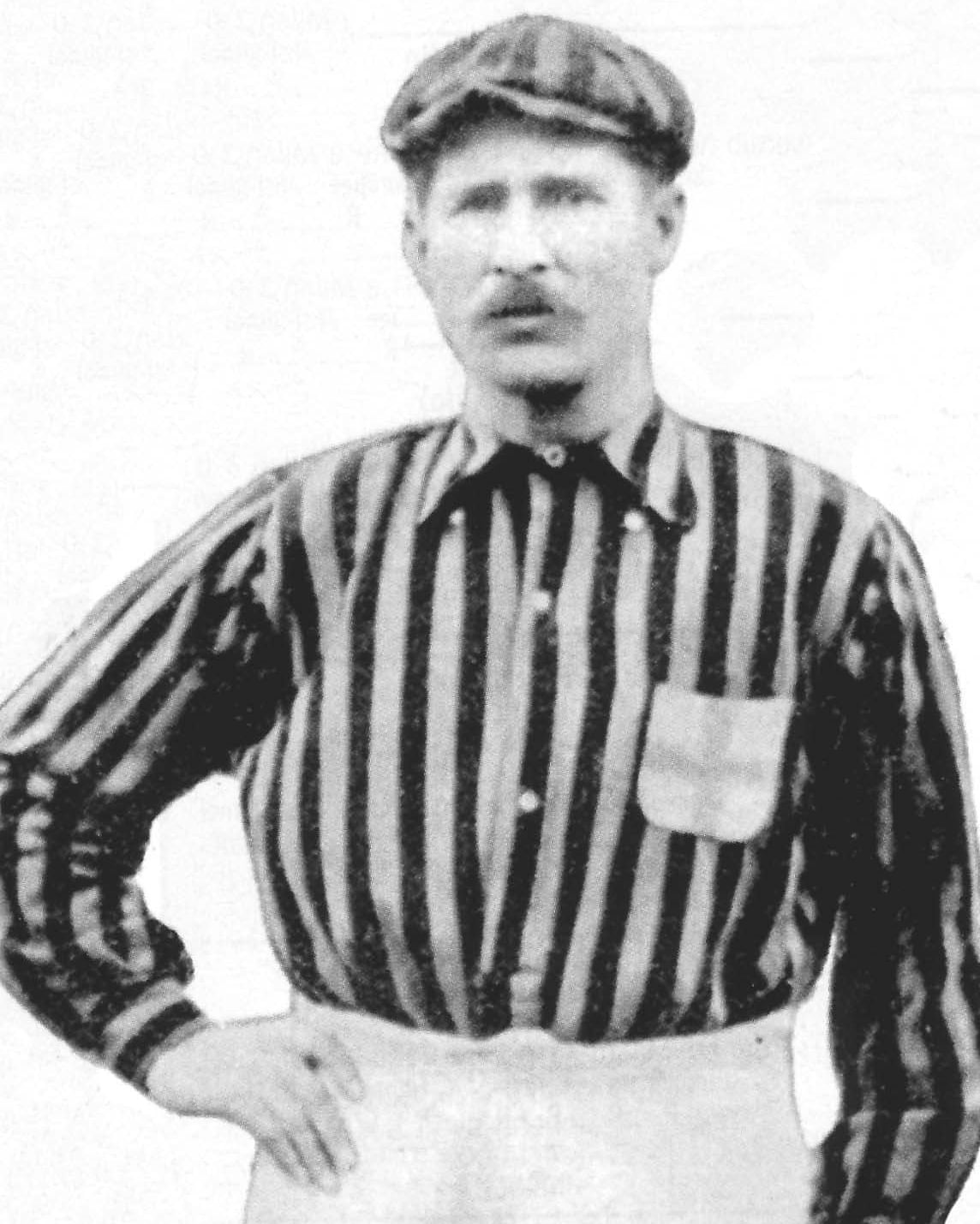
Herbert Kilpin, one of the founders of the Milan Foot-Ball and Cricket Club in 1899.

In the rest of Lombardy, however, the first football section was founded by the Foot Ball Club Casteggio 1898. Previously, in 1874 in Lodi, the Società Lodigiana di Ginnastica e Scherma, which later became the Associazione Sportiva Fanfulla (which founded its football section in 1908), in 1876 the Società Ginnastica Gallaratese (which founded its football section in 1909), in 1878 the Società Ginnastica Monzese Forti e Liberi and the Società Bergamasca di Ginnastica e Scherma (the latter inaugurated its football section in 1913) were founded in the field of gymnastics, in 1879 the Sempre Liberi of Cassano Magnago (whose section was active in the following century), and the Società Ginnastica Pavese (which managed Pavia internally for two years in 1912-1913), in 1881 the Società Ginnastica Pro Patria et Libertate of Busto Arsizio, and in 1895 the Società Canottieri Lecco, which founded its football section in 1912. Also in the last years of the 19th century, but with doubtful dates, the Labor Sportiva of Seregno (which merged in 1920 with the Seregno Foot Ball Club 1913) and the Unione Ginnastica Vogherese (which also officially founded its football section in 1920, later merged with the Associazione Vogherese Calcio) were founded.

=== Teams from Trentino-Alto Adige ===
The oldest sports club in Trento, among those that have played football in their history, seems to be the Unione Ginnastica, founded in 1860. This club, together with the Pro Trento club (whose date of foundation is unknown), has been playing amateur football since the beginning of the 20th century.

Beyond the borders of the Municipality of Trento, three other multisport clubs, founded in the 19th century, had or have a football background: The Unione Sportiva Rovereto, founded in 1878 as the Unione Ginnastica Roveretana, which developed into a football club in 1921; the Turnverein Meran, founded in Merano in 1886 (the year in which activity in the discipline began is unknown, as is the creation of a section dedicated to football); and the Unione Sportiva Arco, founded in 1895 in the municipality of the same name, which formally initiated the practice of the sport in 1921.

=== Venetian teams ===
In Venice, the first sports club dedicated to football was the Società Sportiva Costantino Reyer, founded in 1872, which inaugurated its football section in 1904. In Mestre, a town that was first autonomous and later became part of the capital of Veneto in 1926, the Società Ginnastica Marziale was founded in 1878, whose section dedicated to football was unofficially created in 1892 and officially inaugurated in 1904 (already in 1889, British officers stationed in Mestre introduced the game to the inhabitants, eventually involving Marziale).

Other early gymnastic associations in Veneto that were involved in football were the Istituzione Comunale Marcantonio Bentegodi, founded in 1868 as the Società Veronese di Ginnastica e Scherma (which began playing football in the early 20th century); the Società Rodigina di Ginnastica Unione e Forza, founded in 1874 by the aforementioned Francesco Gabrielli and which began playing football on April 28, 1893; the Società Ginnastica Vicentina Umberto I and the Fortitudo of Schio, the latter dating back to 1875. Also unknown is the year of foundation of the Società Ginnastica Velocipedistica Trevigiana and the Vittorio Veneto of Treviso, which took part in the first gymnastics federation tournament in 1896. The first club in the region to form an official section dedicated to football was Vicenza (March 9, 1902).

=== Teams from Friuli-Venezia Giulia ===
Trieste teams did not play football until 1900. The first known team was the Black Star Football Club, founded in 1906 by Emilio Arnstein (future founder of the Bologna Football Club 1909).

The only club in Friuli-Venezia Giulia that played football before this date seems to have been the Società Udinese di Ginnastica e Scherma, founded in 1896 and winner of the first national gymnastics football competition held in the same year. Internally, however, it was not until 1911 that the Associazione Calcio Udine was founded.

=== Teams from Emilia-Romagna ===
The only old Bolognese club dedicated to football was the Società Sezionale di Ginnastica in Bologna, founded in 1871 (and now known as the Società di Educazione Fisica Virtus), which organized the first recorded football exhibition in Italy on May 9, 1891, and opened a section dedicated to the discipline in 1910.

Outside the capital, the first club in Emilia-Romagna dedicated to football was founded in 1870, the Società di Ginnastica e Scherma del Panaro (originally the "Società Dilettanti di Ginnastica"), which began playing football in 1903; it was followed in 1874 by the Unione Sportiva Ravennate (whose football section, now the Società Cooperativa Ravenna Sport, was founded in 1913), and in 1876 by the Società Ginnastica Persicetana. These clubs were followed in 1879 by the Società Ginnastica La Patria of Carpi, which later also operated a football school, and the Palestra Ginnastica Ferrara, which won the FGNI tournament in 1898 and operated exclusively in the gymnastics field; in 1898 the Unione Sportiva Forti e Liberi of Forlì was founded, which in 1919 formed its football section (today's Forlì FC). Finally, in the last years of the 19th century, the discipline made its first sporadic appearances in Piacenza.

=== Tuscan teams ===
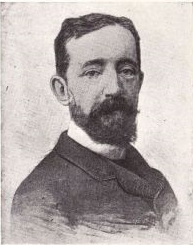
Piero Torrigiani, founder of the Florence Football Club, in 1898.

The capital of Tuscany also has a very old team. Its first football club, Florence Football Club, was founded in 1898. It was preceded by the Palestra Ginnastica Fiorentina Libertas, founded in 1877, which did not establish a football section until 1912; in 1870, the Club Velocipedistico Fiorentino was founded, which merged with the Club Sportivo Ardire in 1903 to form the Club Sportivo Firenze, which established a football section in 1908.

A similar fate befell the Sienese multisport club Mens Sana in Corpore Sano, founded in 1871. In 1904, some of its members split off to form the original nucleus of Siena FC SSD, which in 1972 founded its own football club, the Football Club Luigi Meroni.

=== Umbrian teams ===
The oldest club dedicated to football in Perugia, as in Umbria, seems to have been the Società Ginnastica Braccio Fortebraccio, founded in 1890 as a gymnastics club, which became a multisport club in 1899 and officially dedicated to football in 1901. However, the date of foundation of a similar club, Libertas, which was active in football without apparently creating an official section, remains uncertain.

In addition to the Perugian clubs, Nestor Marsciano (1904), SPES Gubbio (1908) and Unione Sportiva Orvietana (1913) are also worth mentioning. While there is little information available on the first club, it is known that the other two were founded in 1913: however, both Gubbio and Orvietana have been unofficially active in football since 1910 (in the case of Orvietana, even before its actual foundation).

=== Teams from Marche ===
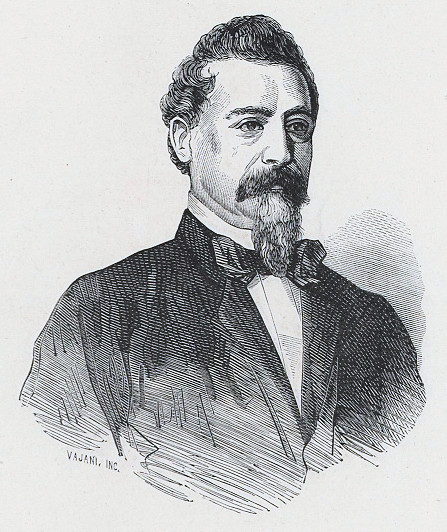
Colonel Candido Augusto Vecchi (1814-1869), after whom Ascoli Calcio was originally named.

The oldest football club in Ancona was AC Ancona, founded in 1905. Before that, British sailors had brought football to the capital of the Marche region, but the sport was only played sporadically.

However, the first team in the region was Candido Augusto Vecchi (later Ascoli Calcio), founded in Ascoli Piceno in 1898. In the same year, the multisport club Vis Sauro Pesaro was founded, but did not start playing football until 1906. Also in 1899, the Società Polisportiva Grottammare was founded, whose football section was created in an unspecified year.

=== Teams from Lazio ===
As in Genoa, football was brought to Rome by foreigners from across the Channel. More precisely, it was the seminarians of the Catholic colleges reserved for British students who imported the new sport. In particular, the English and Welsh boys of the Venerable English College were responsible for the debut of football in the city, which dates back to 1892. Within a few years, several sports clubs in the capital of Italy, all coming from the gymnastics sphere, began playing football: Società Ginnastica Roma, founded in 1890 and active since 1895; the Football Club Roma, founded in 1896; the Sporting Club Roma, founded in 1897; the Associazione Gioventù Cristiana (a political organization founded in the second half of the 19th century and involved in sports since at least 1898); the Società Podistica Lazio, the Veloce Club Podistico, and the Audace Club Podistico, founded in 1900. Notably, Lazio, dedicated to the game since 1901, was the only club among the aforementioned, along with Ginnastica Roma, to abandon the gymnastic variant of football in favor of the IFAB variant, joining FIF at least since 1908 and opening a section dedicated to football on October 3, 1910. These teams were joined by the Società Ginnastica Forza e Coraggio, whose year of foundation is doubtful.

In the rest of the Lazio region, the sport was also practiced by the Associazione Ginnastica Forza e Libertà of Rieti, founded in 1891, which participated in the 1901 FGNI tournament.

=== Teams from Abruzzo ===
Information on the early history of football in Abruzzo is fragmentary and all dates back to the 19th century. The first records of football in L'Aquila date back to the 1910s, when the football sections of multisport clubs such as Amiternina and Folgore developed. In 1915 the L'Aquila Foot-Ball Club was founded.

However, it is likely that the regional capital was preceded by other cities such as Teramo (where the Gran Sasso multisport club was active), Pratola Peligna (where Pratola Calcio was founded in 1910, the first team whose founding year is known) and Vasto (where the sport began to be played in 1902 and the Società Sportiva Umberto I was founded in 1911).

=== Teams from Molise ===
No football club was founded in Molise in the 19th century. The first one was probably the Unione Sportiva Campobasso (1919).

After the club of the capital, ASD Termoli Calcio 1920 was founded in 1920, S.S. Samnium Isernia was founded in 1928 (the year the team debuted in the Italian league), and Associazione Sportiva Agnone was founded in 1929 (the date of the first documented reference to it).

=== Campanian teams ===
The oldest sports club in Naples, among those that practice football, both at the gymnastic level (it participated in the FGNI tournament in 1901) and in its 5-a-side variant, turns out to be Virtus Partenopea, founded in 1866 (within which Sportiva Napoli was founded in 1907). Football made regional headlines in 1896, when the city hosted a football match between the Reale Club Canottieri Italia, a rowing and sailing club founded in 1889, and a mixed team from the other local nautical clubs. However, the creation of a Neapolitan football club had to wait until 1905, when the Football Club Partenopeo (also known as the Napoli Foot-Ball Club) was founded in April on the initiative of the sons of Edoardo Scarfoglio and Matilde Serao, and the Naples Foot-Ball Club (the football section of the Canottieri Italia) was founded in November.

The first club in Campania, however, was Puteoli Sport, founded in Pozzuoli in 1902. Before that, the employees of the English shipyard Armstrong helped to spread the sport in the city.

=== Apulian teams ===
Apulia was one of the first areas in southern Italy where football was played, especially in Bari, where English merchant ships, especially those of the Cunard Line, docked and traded with the city. The first football events in the region took place in the capital: the first matches on June 22 and 29, 1899, organized by Professor Giuseppe Pezzarossa and played by the teams of the Nautical Institute and the Technical Institute; the first tournament took place on July 24, 1900, during a provincial exhibition, in which the joint team of the institutes competed in twelve matches against the team of the high school boys. In February 1901, also in Bari, the first football club in the history of Apulia was founded, the Foot-Ball Challenge Club, formed by students who made their debut against the sailors of the English steamer Osiris.

The Società Sportiva Pro Italia of Taranto, on the other hand, was the first to be founded outside of the regional capital: its origins date back to 1904. In the same year, however, Taranto's Circolo Studentesco Mario Rapisardi began practicing the sport unofficially.

=== Lucanian teams ===
As for Basilicata, Potenza Calcio is the first football club of the region and has been in existence since 1920.

The Unione Sportiva Moliternese, founded in 1922 in Moliterno, was the first to popularize the sport outside the capital, while the Circolo Sportivo Vultur, founded in 1921 in Rionero in Vulture, only started playing football in 1929.

=== Calabrian teams ===
The first club in Calabria officially involved in football was probably Juventus Catanzaro, a multisport club founded in 1908 in the region's capital.

However, there are uncertainties about this fact, because in the same year football began to be played in Cosenza and from then on clubs like the Virides Sport Club, the Brutium, the Liberta, the Milan Sport Club, the Meridionale, the Fratelli Bandiera, the Savoia and the Speranza appeared; however, the exact dates of foundation of these clubs remain unknown. It is known that the Associazione Calcistica Locri 1909 was founded one year later.

=== Sicilian teams ===
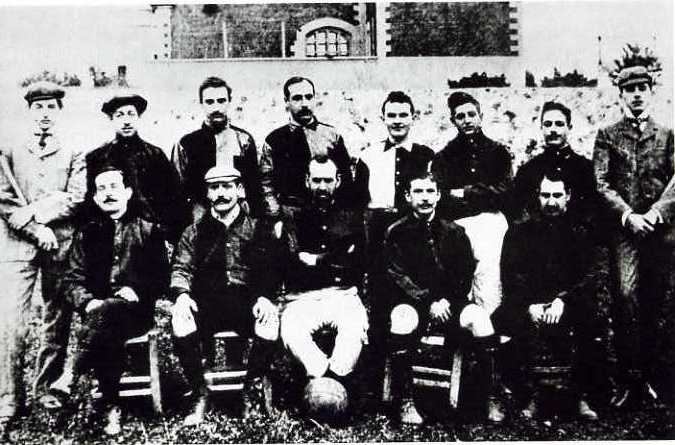
The first lineup of the Anglo-Panormitan Athletic and Foot-Ball Club, 1900.

The first contact with football by the citizens of Palermo dates back to 1897, probably thanks to English sailors and the Sport Club. In 1900, however, the first football club in Sicily, the Anglo-Panormitan Athletic and Foot-Ball Club, was founded in the capital.

Also in 1900, the Messina Football Club was founded. However, the beginning of football in Messina is attributed to the Società Ginnastica Garibaldi of the nineteenth century, which founded its football section in 1910 by incorporating the Messina Football Club.

=== Sardinian teams ===
The first football match recorded in the history of Cagliari was played in 1902 between a group of students from the city and a team of sailors from Genoa. The first multisport clubs in Sardinia to play football, albeit unofficially, were all from Cagliari: the Società Canottieri Ichnusa (1891), the Società Ginnastica Amsicora (1897) and the Società Ginnastica Eleonora d'Arborea (1900). The participation of Amsicora's athletes in a football competition held during the Turin International Exhibition of 1911 is well documented.

The first recorded football matches on the island, however, took place in Calangianus at the end of the 19th century between British workers and technicians called in to build a railway line. The two clubs that inaugurated the official Sardinian football activity were the Società Educazione Fisica Torres of Sassari and the Associazione Sportiva Dilettantistica Ilvamaddalena of La Maddalena (1903). Torres also played in the aforementioned Turin event.

== Ranking by founding date ==
Despite the fact that Genoa is the Italian football club with the oldest official charter, sources attribute the record of the first football team founded in Italy to the Turin Football & Cricket Club.

The table in this section lists the association football teams that were officially established by the end of the 19th century. The names of those that still exist today are in bold. The list is not exhaustive, as there is a lack of information on some clubs.

With the exception of the multisport clubs Ginnastica Torino (1844), Sampierdarenese (June 6, 1891), Andrea Doria (September 5, 1895), and Mediolanum (February 11, 1896), the founding dates of the football sections coincide with the official founding dates of the clubs to which they belonged. At the same time, the disappearance of the football teams coincided with the definitive dissolution of the corresponding association, with the exception of the four clubs mentioned above, which are still active.

#	Team	City	Establishment of the team	Official debut
01	Torino Football & Cricket Club	Turin	March 13, spring or November 1887	Did not occur
02	Nobili Torino	Turin	1889	Did not occur
03	Internazionale Torino	Turin	September 7-December 31 1891	May 8, 1898, 09:00 a.m. - FIF Italian Championship.
04	**Genoa Cricket and Football Club**	Genoa	September 7, 1893	May 8, 1898, 11:00 a.m. - FIF Italian Championship.
05	Football Club Torinese	Turin	1894	May 8, 1898, 09:00 a.m. - FIF Italian Championship.
06	Unione Pro Sport Alessandria	Alessandria	August 1896	Did not occur
07	Reale Società Ginnastica di Torino	Turin	January 1-October 31 1897	May 8, 1898, 11:00 a.m. - FIF Italian Championship.
07	Liguria Foot Ball Club	Sampierdarena (GE)	April 1897	December 10, 1911 - FIGC Seconda Categoria.
07	**Juventus Football Club**	Turin	Autumn 1897	March 11, 1900 - FIF Italian Championship
10	**Foot Ball Club Casteggio 1898**	Casteggio (PV)	1898	1913 - FIGC Promozione.
10	Società per l'Educazione Fisica Mediolanum	Milan	May 15, 1898	April 14, 1901 - FIF Italian Championship
10	Florence Football Club 1898	Florence	May 26, 1898	March 15, 1908 - FIF Terza Categoria.
10	**Ascoli Calcio 1898 FC**	Ascoli Piceno	November 1 1898	1926 - FIGC Terza Divisione.
14	Sport Club Audace Torino	Turin	January 1-May 13, 1899	March 2, 1902 - FIF Italian Championship
14	Associazione Calcio Sampierdarenese	Genoa	March 19, 1899	April 8, 1900, 3:00 p.m. - FIF Italian Championship.
16	**Associazione Calcio Milan**	Milan	December 18 1899	April 15, 1900 - FIF Italian Championship
17	Società Ginnastica Andrea Doria	Genoa	January 1-August 10, 1900	March 9, 1902 - FIF Italian Championship
18	**Palermo Football Club**	Palermo	November 1 1900	December 18, 1921 - CCI Prima Divisione
19	**Associazioni Calcio Riunite Messina**	Messina	December 1, 1900	December 18, 1921 - CCI Prima Divisione

== See also ==
- Football in Italy

== Bibliography ==
- Bocca, Claudia (2010). Torino capitale [Turin, capital] (in Italian). Roma: Newton Compton. ISBN 978-88-541-2254-3.
- Boccassi, Ugo; Cavalli, Anna (2010). La sostenibile certezza dell'essere "grigi" prima del 1912 [The sustainable certainty of being “gray” before 1912] (in Italian). Alessandria: I Grafismi.
- Fantini, Manlio (1977). F.C. Genoa (in Italian). Bologna: Edi Grafica.
- Fontanelli, Carlo (2006). Il ritorno del Genoa. I campionati italiani della stagione 1901-1902 [The Return of Genoa. The Italian championships of the 1901-1902 season.] (in Italian). Empoli: GEO Edizioni.
- Fontanelli, Carlo (2014). Cento anni biancocelesti [One hundred years of white and sky blue] (in Italian). Empoli: GEO Edizioni.
- Gallian, Marcello (1928). Arpinati politico e uomo di sport. La storia dello sport italiano [Arpinati, politician and sportsman. The history of Italian sport] (in Italian). Roma: Pinciana.
- Impiglia, Marco (2003). Pionieri del calcio romano [Pioneers of Roman soccer] (in Italian). Roma: La Campanella. ISBN 88-88519-07-6.
- Papa, Antonio; Panico, Guido (1993). Storia sociale del calcio in Italia [Social history of soccer in Italy] (in Italian). Bologna: Il Mulino. ISBN 88-15-08764-8.
- Various authors (1967). Il Pallone d'Oro - Prima enciclopedia storica del calcio mondiale [The Golden Ball - First historical encyclopedia of world soccer] (in Italian). Vol. III. Milano: Perna Editore.
- Ranieri di Sorbello, Uguccione (2005). Perugia della Bell'Epoca 1859-1915 [Perugia of the Golden Age 1859-1915] (in Italian) (Nuova edizione riveduta ed.). Perugia: Volumnia Editrice.
- Romanato, Maurizio (2008). Francesco Gabrielli (1857-1899). Le origini del calcio in Italia: dalla ginnastica allo sport [Francesco Gabrielli (1857-1899). The origins of soccer in Italy: from gymnastics to sport] (in Italian). Treviso: Antilia. ISBN 978-88-87073-86-7.
- Sappino, Marco (2000). Dizionario del calcio italiano [Dictionary of Italian soccer] (in Italian) (1ª edizione ed.). Milano: Baldini & Castoldi. ISBN 88-8089-862-0.
- Renna, Piergiorgio (2008). Il football a Napoli [Football in Naples] (in Italian). Cassino: Idea Stampa. ISBN 978-88-902324-3-5.
- Signorelli, Amalia (2002). Cultura popolare a Napoli e in Campania nel Novecento [Popular culture in Naples and Campania in the twentieth century] (in Italian). Napoli: Guida. ISBN 88-7188-643-7.
- Valentini, Sergio (2011). E arrivarono i bersaglieri. I primi trent'anni di Roma capitale [And the bersaglieri arrived. The first thirty years of Rome] (in Italian). Roma: La Lepre. ISBN 978-88-96052-36-5.
- Vanni, Giuseppe (1999). Notizie di calcio trinese (1898-1999) [History of football in Trino (1898-1999)] (in Italian). Trino: Comune di Trino - Studi Trinesi/16.
- Antonucci, Gianni (2008). 1908-2008: Bari e il Bari [1908-2008: Bari and Bari] (in Italian). Bari: Mario Adda Editore.
- Giovine, Felice (2018). Football Club Bari Le origini [Origins of Football Club Bari] (in Italian). Bari: LB Edizioni.
- Turco, Fabrizio; Savasta, Vincenzo (2014). Il calcio dimenticato. Toro, Genoa, Milan, Juve: il pallone dei pionieri [Forgotten soccer. Toro, Genoa, Milan, Juve: the ball of the pioneers.] (in Italian). Roma: Editori Internazionali Riuniti. ISBN 978-88-359-9419-0.
- Calzia, Fabrizio (1994). Cent'anni di slancio [One hundred years of momentum] (in Italian). Genova: GGallery. ISBN 978-88-7563-243-4.
