= Howard Passadoro =

Welsh-Italian footballer

Personal information
- Date of birth: 1871
- Place of birth: Newport, Wales
- Date of death: 25 June 1921 (aged 49–50)
- Place of death: Guildford, England
- Position: Defender

Senior career*
Years	Team	Apps	(Gls)
1898–1903	Genoa	9	(0)
- * Club domestic league appearances and goals

Carlo Howard L. Passadoro (1871 – 25 June 1921) was a Welsh-Italian footballer who won four Italian Football Championship titles with Genoa C.F.C. between 1899 and 1903.

Passadoro was born to Genoese parents in Newport, Wales . His father is listed in 1881 census of Wales as a coal exporter living in the Roath area of Cardiff.

== Honours ==
- 1899 Italian Football Championship (Genoa)
- 1900 Italian Football Championship (Genoa)
- 1902 Italian Football Championship (Genoa)
- 1903 Italian Football Championship (Genoa)
