= Italian football league system =

League system for association football in Italy

The Italian football league system, also known as the Italian football pyramid, refers to the hierarchically interconnected league system for association football in Italy. It consists of nine national and regional tournaments, the first three being professional, while the remaining six are amateur, set up by the Italian Football Federation. One team from San Marino also competes. The system has a hierarchical format with promotion and relegation between different divisions.

In theory, it is possible for a local amateur club to rise to the pinnacle of the Italian game and win the Scudetto. While this is unlikely in practice, movement within the pyramid does occur. A notable example is AC ChievoVerona, which from the lower division went to Serie A, the highest level, reaching as high as 4th place in 2005–06 Serie A. The top two levels contain one division each. Below this, the levels have progressively more parallel divisions, which each cover progressively smaller geographic areas.

== History ==
The Genoa Cricket and Athletic Club, later known as the Genoa Cricket and Football Club was established on 7 September 1893, Italy's fourth oldest football team (after Torino F.C.C., Nobili Torino and Internazionale Torino), and the oldest active Italian football team, with 13 decades of activity. In March 1898, the Italian Football Federation (Federazione Italiana del Football, in 1909 re-named Federazione Italiana Giuoco Calcio, FIGC) was set up in Turin. Four clubs joined – Genoa, FC Torinese, Internazionale di Torino and the Società Ginnastica di Torino (Gymnastic Society of Torino). Other clubs existed but decided not to join. The first championship took place on a single day, May 8, 1898, in Torino. The title was won by Genoa.

The FIF joined FIFA in 1905 and the championship moved to a regional league set up in the same year.

After the interruption of World War I, football popularity grew and smaller clubs joined. In the summer of 1921, a second association was briefly created in competition with the FIGC: the Confederazione Calcistica Italiana (CCI), emerged from an argument between major and minor clubs over the structure of the national leagues. Hence in 1922 Italy had two champions US Pro Vercelli and US Novese. The two groups eventually re-merged at the end of the season.

The restructure to form a single national league structure occurred in 1929. At national level, two hierarchical divisions were initially formed with promotion and relegation between two divisions named Serie A and Serie B. Initially eighteen teams were in Serie A. The first Serie A winners were Internazionale in 1930. The national team also won the World Cup in 1934 and 1938.

After World War II the league briefly returned to a regional structure with a north–south divide and a play-off for a single year before Serie A was restored. Torino were the first post-war league champions and went on to win four in a row. However, it is Juventus, Milan and Internazionale that have dominated the league since World War II, having won the title in 57 of the 74 seasons.

The current league system dates back to 1978, when semi-professional sector was disbanded. In that year, the current Lega Pro (then known as National Semiprofessional League) which ruled Serie C and Serie D, turned in a fully professional league organizing new Serie C1 and Serie C2. Italy so became the only country having two distinct professional football leagues, 14 years before England. In 2010, with the split between Lega Serie A and Lega Serie B, Italy became the sole country with three professional leagues. The Serie C was brought back in 2014, abolishing Serie C1 and Serie C2.

== Structure ==
The system uses the principle of promotion and relegation. The first tier of Italian football is Serie A, which is governed by the Lega Nazionale Professionisti Serie A and is made up of 20 teams. The second tier is Serie B, which is organised by the Lega Nazionale Professionisti B. Both of these leagues cover the whole of Italy.

The third tier is Serie C. It is run by the Lega Italiana Calcio Professionistico; it has three divisions of 20 clubs each, which are generally split on the basis of location.

At the fourth tier is Serie D, a league of nine parallel divisions (in which the clubs are divided by geographical location) that is organised by the Dipartimento Interregionale of the Lega Nazionale Dilettanti. Beneath these are five further levels; three of them, Eccellenza, Promozione and Prima Categoria, are organised by regional committees of the Lega Nazionale Dilettanti; and the last two levels, Seconda Categoria and Terza Categoria, by provincial committees.

All 100 Serie A, Serie B and Serie C teams are professional.

Level	Divisions
	Professional Leagues
1	Serie A (One national division, 20 clubs)
2	Serie B (One national division, 20 clubs)
3	Serie C (3 interregional divisions of 20 clubs each)
	Non-professional Leagues
4	Serie D (9 interregional divisions, 18 clubs per division)
5	Eccellenza (28 regional divisions, 16–18 clubs per division)
6	Promozione (53 regional divisions, 14–18 clubs per division)
7	Prima Categoria (105 regional divisions, 16 clubs per division)
8	Seconda Categoria (182 regional/provincial divisions, 16 clubs per division)
9	Terza Categoria (232 provincial divisions, 6–18 clubs per division)

From 2005—2006 season, if two or more teams end the league with the same number of points, the final place is given from following criteria (that count for every division):

1. Head-to-head records;
2. Goal difference of head-to-head records;
3. Goal difference of regular season;
4. Most of goals scored;
5. Draw.

== Women ==
The women's system is divided into five levels. From 2002 to 2013, the Serie A2 existed between the Serie A and B, but it has since been renamed to B.

Starting from the 2022-2023 season, the Serie A Women adopted a new format and became a professional league.

Level	Divisions
	Professional Leagues
1	Serie A One national division, 12 clubs
	Non-professional Leagues
2	Serie B One national division, 14 clubs 12-16 clubs from 2018 to 2025 season (3–4 interregional divisions from 1970 to 2018)
3	Serie C 4 interregional divisions, 12–14 clubs per division from his foundation in 2018 (Highest regional leagues until the 2017–18 season)
4	Eccellenza; 19 regional divisions (Highest regional leagues from 2018 to 2019; from 1978 to 2018 as Serie C)
5	Promozione; Regional divisions (Lowest regional leagues; until the 2017–18 season as Serie D)

== See also ==
- Divisione Nazionale
- Serie C1
- Serie C2
- Campionato Primavera
- Campionato Berretti
- Torneo di Viareggio
- List of association football competitions
- List of football clubs in Italy
- Italian Football League (American football)
- History of the first football clubs in Italy
