= Edoardo Bosio =

Italian footballer (1864–1927)

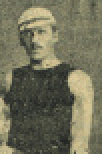
- Bosio in 1889

Personal information
- Full name: Edoardo Johann Peter Bosio
- Date of birth: 9 November 1864
- Place of birth: Turin, Kingdom of Italy
- Date of death: 31 July 1927 (aged 62)
- Place of death: Davos, Switzerland
- Position: Forward

Senior career*
Years	Team	Apps	(Gls)
1887–1891	Torino FCC	0	(0)
1891–1899	Internazionale Torino	4	(3)
1900–1902	FBC Torinese	1+	(3+)
- * Club domestic league appearances and goals

Edoardo Bosio (Italian pronunciation: [edoˈardo ˈbɔːzjo]; 9 November 1864 – 31 July 1927) was an Italian footballing innovator from Turin who played as a forward. He is a prime figure in the history of Italian football as evidence exists to show that he founded the earliest football club in the country; Torino Football and Cricket Club. He was also a clever rower of the Armida Rowing Club in Turin.

== Biography ==
As a young man, Bosio was a merchant worker in the British "Thomas Adams" textile industry, as part of his work he had the opportunity to live in Nottingham, England for a while and experienced the game of football. Upon returning to his native Turin in 1886 he was determined to spread the word of football in his homeland; he brought back a leather ball and founded Torino Football and Cricket Club that year.

Bosio remained involved with the club after they merged with Nobili Torino to form Internazionale Torino. This is the club with whom he competed in the earliest Italian Football Championships, picking up two runner-up medals with the club. He even lured the famous Herbert Kilpin into Italian football, when he was hired to work for Bosio in the textiles industry.

In 1900 Bosio remained with the club as they merged into FBC Torinese, picking up another runner-up spot and notably scoring a hat-trick against Milan in the semi-finals of the Italian Football Championship which made him the topscorer of the tournament.

== Honours ==
Internazionale Torino

- Italian Football Championship runner-up: 1898, 1899

Torinese

- Italian Football Championship runner-up: 1900

Individual

- Capocannoniere: 1898

== Filmography ==
- 1914 - La Vita Negli Abissi Del Mare
