= Armida (disambiguation) =

Armida is a beautiful enchantress in Torquato Tasso's Jerusalem Delivered.

Armida may also refer to:

== Music and operas ==
- A character in the epic poem Jerusalem Delivered; includes an extensive list of works based on the poem
- L'Armida, a 1641 opera by Italian composer Marco Marazzoli
- Armide (Lully), a 1686 opera by French composer Jean-Baptiste Lully
- L'Armida, by Carl Heinrich Graun (Berlin, 1751)
- Armida (Salieri), by Antonio Salieri (Vienna, 1771)
- Armida (Sacchini), by Antonio Sacchini (Milan, 1772)
- Armide (Gluck), by Christoph Willibald Gluck (Paris, 1777)
- Armida (Mysliveček), by Josef Mysliveček (Milan, 1780)
- Armida (Haydn), by Joseph Haydn (1784)
- Armida (Rossini), by Gioacchino Rossini (Naples, 1817)
- Armida (Dvořák), by Antonín Dvořák (1904)
- Armida (Weir), by Judith Weir (2005)
- An 1855 ballet by Cesare Pugni, and Jules Perrot

== Other uses ==
- 514 Armida, a minor planet
- Armida (actress) or Armida Vendrell (1911–1989), Mexican actress, singer, dancer and vaudevillian
- Armida Publications, a publishing house in Nicosia, Cyprus
- Armida Rowing Club, an Italian rowing club, Turin, Italy
