= Francesco Gabrielli (teacher) =

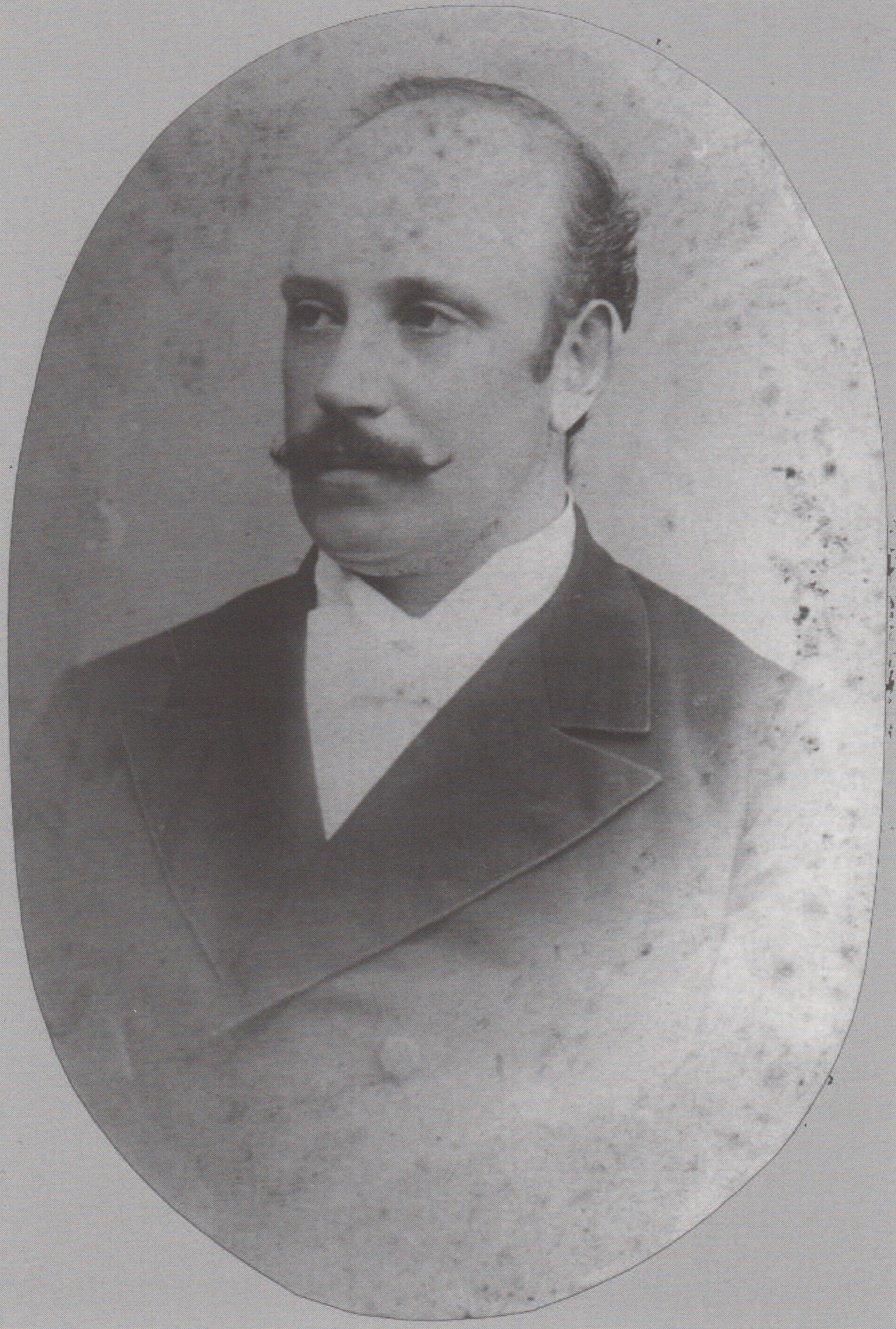
- Born: 1 August 1857; Bologna, Italy
- Died: 19 March 1899 (aged 41); Rovigo, Italy

Francesco Gabrielli (1857–1899) was a school teacher who wrote the first rules for Football in Italy and came up with many of the football terms used in Italian football. Many of these things were inspired through his practice of gymnastics.
