= Football in Italy =

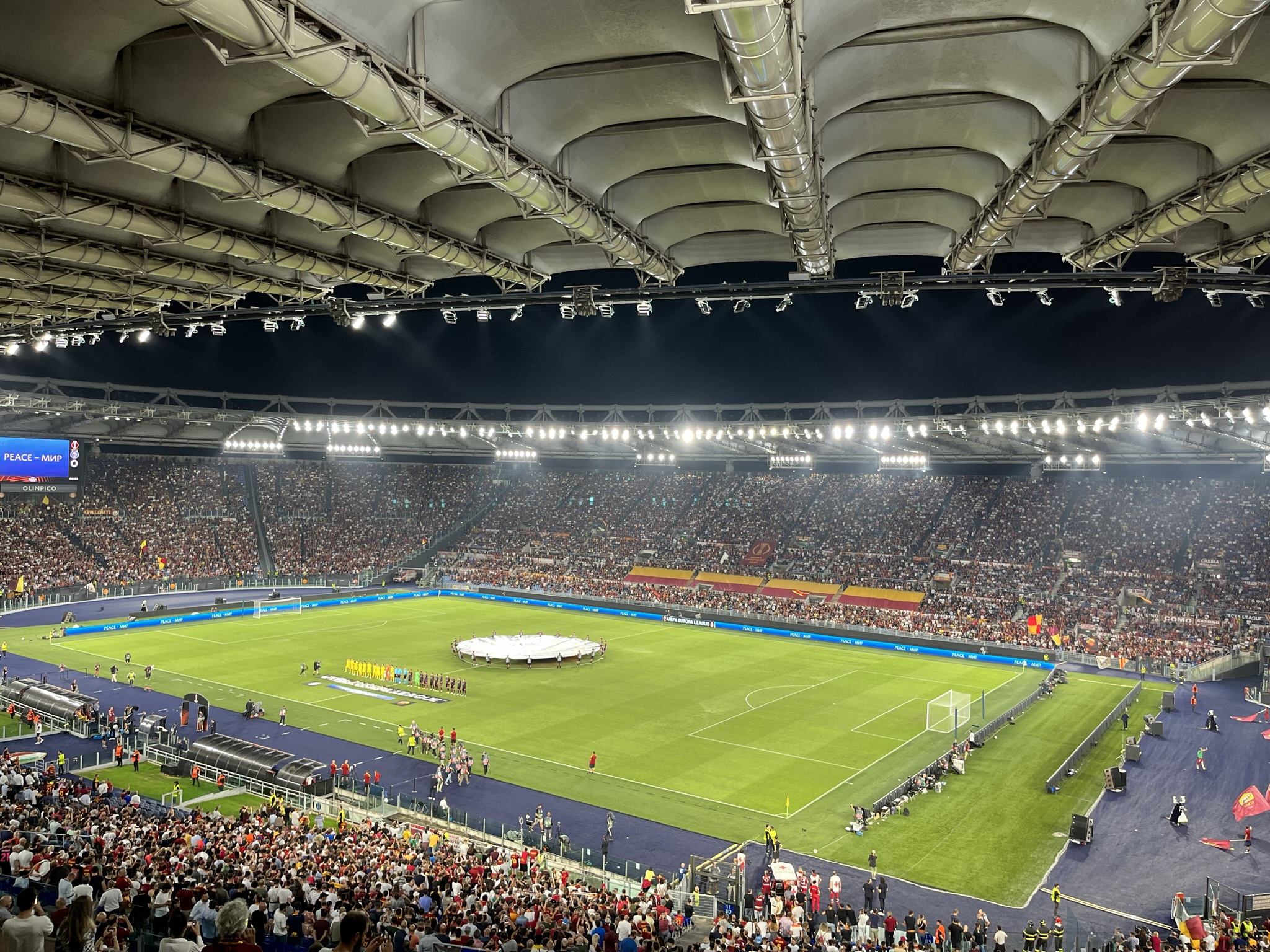
- Stadio Olimpico in Rome, used by Lazio, Roma, and the Italy national football team
- Country: Italy
- Governing body: FIGC
- National team: Italy
- First played: 1898; 128 years ago

National competitions
- FIFA World Cup; UEFA European Championship; UEFA Nations League; CONMEBOL–UEFA Cup of Champions

Club competitions
- List: League: Serie A Serie A (women's football) Serie B Serie C Serie D Eccellenza Promozione Prima Categoria Seconda Categoria Terza Categoria; Cups: Coppa Italia Coppa Italia (women) Supercoppa Italiana Supercoppa Italiana (women)

International competitions
- FIFA Club World Cup; FIFA Intercontinental Cup; UEFA Champions League; UEFA Women's Champions League; UEFA Europa League; UEFA Conference League; UEFA Super Cup

Football (Italian: calcio [ˈkaltʃo]) is the most popular sport in Italy. The Italy national football team have won the FIFA World Cup four times (1934, 1938, 1982, 2006), trailing only Brazil (with five), runners-up in two finals both against Brazil, (1970, 1994) and reaching a third place (1990) and a fourth place (1978). They have also won two European Championships (1968 and 2020), also appeared in two finals (2000, 2012), finished third at the Confederations Cup (2013) and the Nations League (2021 and 2023), won one Olympic football tournament (1936) and two Central European International Cups (1927–30 and 1933–35).

Italy's top domestic league, the Serie A, is one of the most popular professional sports leagues in the world because it is often depicted as the most tactical national football league, and is among the top five European football leagues. Italy's club sides have won 48 major European trophies, making them the second most successful nation in European football. Serie A hosts three of the world's most famous clubs as Juventus, Milan, and Inter, all founding members of the G-14, a group which represented the largest and most prestigious European football clubs; Serie A was the only league to produce three founding members.

Juventus, Milan, and Inter (the Big Three), along with Roma, Lazio, historically Parma and Fiorentina but now replaced by Napoli and Atalanta are known as the Seven Sisters of Italian football due to their popular support and dominance in league and cups between the 1990s and 2020s. (Note: The Seven Sisters of Italian football was first coined in reference to the seven top Italian clubs, including Juventus, Milan, Inter, Roma, Lazio, Parma, and Fiorentina, all which achieved domestic and continental success, or were among the top seven in each league of the late 1990s and early 2000s. It is recognised as a golden age of Italian football, making Serie A the top European league, and for its many top players, including among others Gianluca Vialli, Fabrizio Ravanelli, Alessandro Del Piero, Roberto Baggio, Zinedine Zidane, Gianluigi Buffon, David Trezeguet, Edgar Davids, Didier Deschamps, Ronaldo, Javier Zanetti, Youri Djorkaeff, Giuseppe Bergomi, Roberto Carlos, Álvaro Recoba, Christian Vieri, George Weah, Andriy Shevchenko, Marco van Basten, Paolo Maldini, Franco Baresi, Ruud Gullit, Frank Rijkaard, Serginho, Clarence Seedorf, Andrea Pirlo, Rui Costa, Francesco Totti, Aldair, Cafu, Gabriel Batistuta, Emerson, Walter Samuel, Vincent Candela, Vincenzo Montella, Hidetoshi Nakata, Marco Delvecchio, Pavel Nedvěd, Roberto Mancini, Juan Sebastián Verón, Siniša Mihajlović, Alessandro Nesta, Diego Simeone, Angelo Peruzzi, Marcelo Salas, Simone Inzaghi, Lilian Thuram, Zé Maria, Hernán Crespo, Enrico Chiesa, Fernando Couto, Dino Baggio, Gianfranco Zola, Rui Costa, and Francesco Toldo. Although originally used in reference to that specific period and still used to refer to the late 1990s and early 2000s of Italian football, the Seven Sisters evolved to become a general concept of Italian football and came to include Napoli and Atalanta, replacing Parma and Fiorentina, with both of them having been crippled by debt in the 2000s, and since then and the 2010s the leagues were mainly fought between two clubs. Since the 2010s and into 2020s, some spoke of the new Seven Sisters, while others expanded it to Eight Sisters and again included Fiorentina; some also wondered whether the concept was still relevant, citing the big margins from the first to the seventh placed in the 2021–22 Serie A.) Italian managers are among the most successful in European football, especially in competitions such as the Champions League. More players have won the coveted Ballon d'Or award while playing in Serie A than any other league in the world after La Liga.

== History ==
=== Ancient times and calcio fiorentino ===
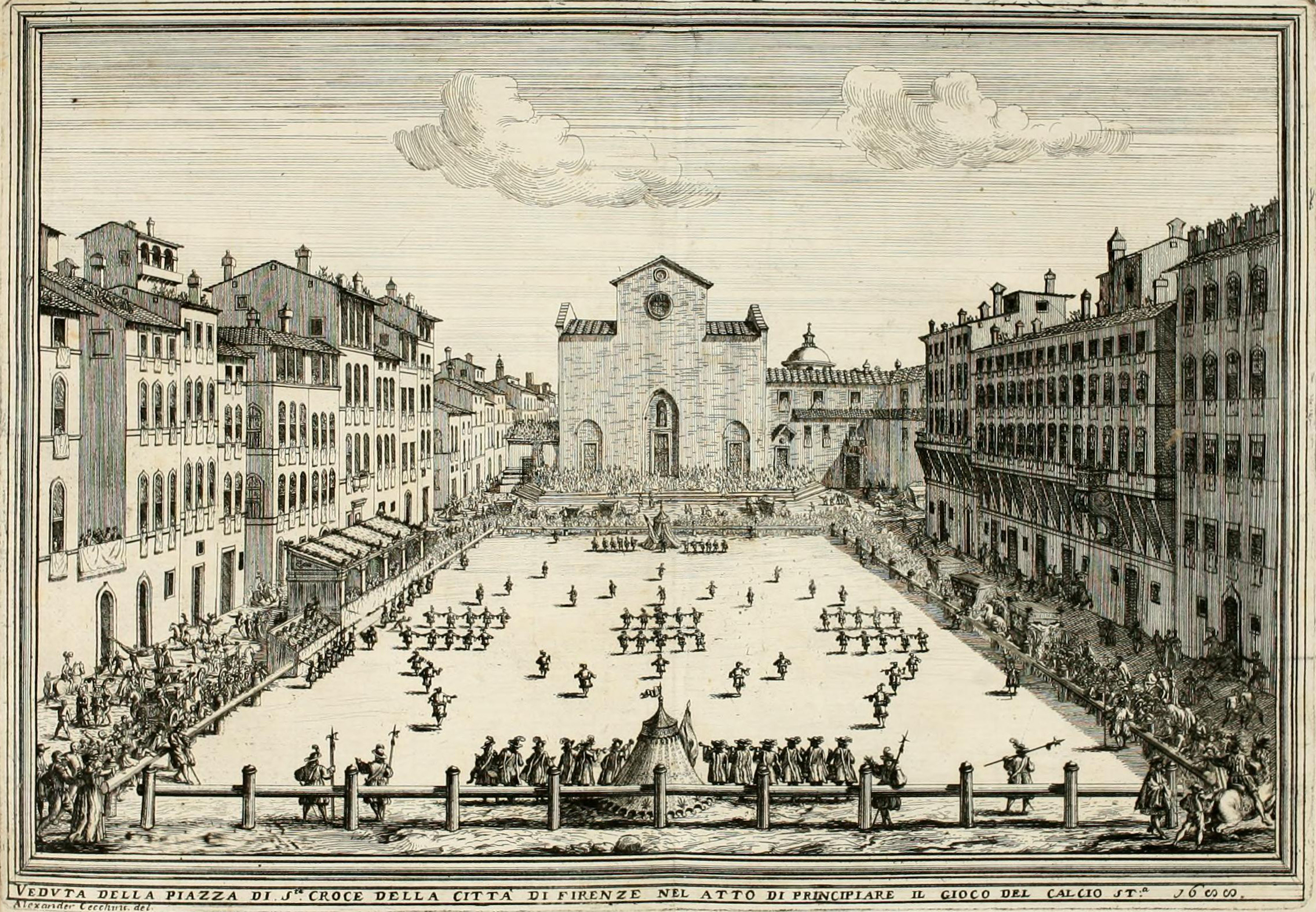
Illustration of a game of calcio fiorentino from 1688

Other forms of football were played in Italy in ancient times, the earliest of which was Harpastum, played during the times of the Roman Empire. This game may have also been influential in other forms throughout Europe due to the expansion of the Roman Empire, including Medieval football. From the 16th century onwards, calcio fiorentino, another code of football distinct from the modern game, was played in the Piazza Santa Croce in Florence. Some famous Florentines were among the players of the game, particularly the Medici family including Piero, Lorenzo, and Alessandro de' Medici, as well as popes who played the game in the Vatican, such as Clement VII, Leo XI, and Urban VIII. The name calcio ("kick") was later adopted for football in Italy (attested first in 1889, "Il Foot-ball ovvero il Giuoco del Calcio"), becoming the synonym for Italian association football worldwide, as well as the most popular sport in Italy.

=== Italian football is born in Turin and Genoa ===
The modern variation of the game was brought to Italy during the 1880s. Edoardo Bosio, a merchant worker in the British textile industry, had visited England and experienced the game. He returned to Turin in 1887 and was motivated to help spread football in his homeland. He founded the first football club in Italy (Torino Football and Cricket Club) that year, while Nobili Torino (Turin Nobles) soon followed. The second club bore the name noble because it contained Luigi Amedeo, Duke of the Abruzzi, and Alfonso Ferrero de Gubernatis Ventimiglia, who would later become president of the Italian Football Federation (FIGC). The two merged in 1891 to form Internazionale Football Club Torino. Genoa Cricket and Football Club, formed as a cricket club to represent England abroad, was founded by Englishmen in 1893. In 1896, a man named James Richardson Spensley arrived in Genoa and introduced the football section of the club, becoming its first manager. Genoa is the oldest Italian football club still active and the one in possession of the oldest founding document.

Some early tournaments were organised by the Italian Gymnastics Federation (FGI, later named FGNI, Federazione Ginnastica Nazionale Italiana)) between 1895 and 1897 and until 1913. In 1898, a new federation, the future FIGC but then known as Federazione Italiana del Foot-ball (FIF) until 1909, was formed, centred originally in Turin. The FIF first president was Mario Vicary.

The FIGC created the Italian Football Championship with the four founding clubs being; Genoa, Torinese, Ginnastica Torino, and Internazionale Torino. Its first competition, the 1898 Italian Football Championship, was held at the Velodrome Humbert I in Turin on 8 May 1898, and was won by Genoa. Genoa won the Italian Football Championship on five out of six occasions, interrupted by AC Milan in 1901. While it was common for clubs to compete in both FIGC and FGNI competitions early on, the titles won in the FIGC championship are the only ones officially recognised by the modern-day league.

From 1904 the replacement tournament called Prima Categoria was structured into regional groups. Winners of each group participated in a playoff with the eventual winners being declared champions. Between 1905 and 1908, a Final Group among regional champions was contested to award the title and the Spensley Cup. Juventus won his first title and Spensley Cup in 1905, while the following two championships were won by Milan.

=== Italianisation and split of the championship ===
In November 1907, the FIF organised two championships for the 1908 season:

1. Italian Championship: The main tournament where only Italian players were allowed to play; the winners would be proclaimed Campioni d'Italia (Italian Champions) and would be awarded the Bruni Cup.
2. Federal Championship: A secondary tournament where foreign players (if they lived in Italy) were also allowed to play; the winners would be proclaimed Campioni Federali (Federal Champions) and would be awarded the Spensley Cup.

The FIF wanted to organise two different championships in order to allow weaker clubs, composed only of Italian players (squadre pure italiane, "pure Italian teams"), to win the national title, and to relegate simultaneously the big clubs, composed mostly of stronger foreign players (squadre spurie internazionali, "spurious international teams") in a minor competition for a "consolation prize". The majority of big clubs (Genoa, Milan, and Torino) withdrew from both the championships in order to protest against the autocratic policy of the FIF.

The 1908 Italian Championship and the Bruni Cup were won by Pro Vercelli, beating Juventus, Doria, and Milanese. The Federal Championship was won by Juventus against Doria,. The Federal Championship won by Juventus was later forgotten by FIGC due to the boycott by the dissident clubs. 1908 also saw a scission within Milan that led to the foundation of Inter.

In the 1909 Italian football season, the two different championships were organised again, with the Oberti Cup in lieu of the Spensley Cup for the Federal Championship. This time, the majority of big clubs decided to only withdraw from the Italian Championship in order to make the Federal competition the most relevant tournament and to diminish the Italian one. The Federal Championship was won by Pro Vercelli, beating Milanese in the Final, while the Italian Championship was won by Juventus, again beating Milanese in the Final. Ultimately, the dissenters' strategy worked out, as the failure of the Italian Championship won by Juventus forced the FIGC to later recognise the Federal Champions of Pro Vercelli as "Campioni d'Italia 1909", disavowing the other tournament and depriving Juventus of another title. (Note: Even when these lost two scudetti by Juventus attracted attention into the 21st century, the club did not appeal to have them recognised and the FIGC ignored it, and others, including the prestigious Guerin Sportivo and Juworld.net, questioned the events, saying it is not clear after many years why the only recognised official championship was the one won by Pro Vercelli, and why in practice the Italian Championship was recognised as official for one year and the Federal Championship for another year. In a 2012 interview to Sky Sport Italia, the then Guerin Sportivo director Matteo Marani suggested the same solution that was achieved in 1922 when both Pro Vercelli and Novese were recognised as champions, since FIGC recognised as a valid scudetto in all respects the one won by Pro Vercelli in a championship organised by a federation (the CCI) that was born in open contrast and opposition to the FIGC itself. He said: "I am not saying that it should be taken away from Pro Vercelli, but two [scudetti] should be given. The [Italian] Football Federation itself, at the moment in which there is a historical act that establishes it, must discuss it, I do not think it can pass in silence.")

The format was modified for the 1909–10 Prima Categoria, which was played in a league format. Nine clubs participated, playing each other both home and away. The split between Federal and Italian championship was not completely abolished because, while unifying these tournaments, it was decided for the last time to assign two titles at the end of the season. In fact, the FIGC established to proclaim as Federal Champions (now turned into the main title) the first-placed club in the general classification, while recognised as Italian Champions (now become the secondary title) would be the best placed club among the four "pure Italian teams", depending on the head-to-head matches. At the end of the season, Pro Vercelli and Inter finished joint-top, so a playoff was needed in order to assign the Federal title (the Italian one was won by Pro Vercelli). This season was the first victory for Inter, having defeated Pro Vercelli in the final by a score of 10–3. Even the Italian title won by Pro Vercelli was later forgotten.

== National championship ==
A first national competition organised by the Italian Gymnastics Federation (FGNI–FGI) was played in 1896, the same year of the first modern Olympic Games, and won by a team from Udine, an Italian northeast city in the Friuli-Venezia Giulia region, named Udinese. In 1897, a second national gymnastic-football tournament was won by SG Torinese. In 1898, the Federazione Italiana del Foot-ball (FIF–FIGC) was finally formed and the first national championship was organised, with regional tournaments and playoffs. Held in Turin on the occasion of the International Exhibition for the fiftieth anniversary of the Albertine Statute, with about one hundred spectators in attendance, it included four clubs, three matches, and lasted a single day. This is considered to be the first proper national football championship and was won using the Pyramid formation (2–3–5) by Genoa, which then went on to win five more championships in six years. Caffaro, a newspaper in Genoa, headlined "The Genoese winners of the national championship", while another reported that the competitors gathered at a restaurant, where they had dinner and the championship cup was delivered to the winning team. To celebrate the event of the first national football championship, Franco Bernini wrote a book in 2005 entitled La prima volta.

== National teams ==
The Italy national football team, called Azzurri or squadra azzurra for their blue shirts, are the third-most successful national team in the World Cup for number of medals. During the 1970s to early 1990s, Italy became famous for their catenaccio, thus heralding a long line of world class defenders, such as Virginio Rosetta, Pietro Rava, Carlo Parola, Giacinto Facchetti, Armando Picchi, Gaetano Scirea, Antonio Cabrini, Claudio Gentile, Franco Baresi, Giuseppe Bergomi, Paolo Maldini, Alessandro Nesta, Fabio Cannavaro, Andrea Barzagli, Leonardo Bonucci, and Giorgio Chiellini. Defence is traditionally the best part of Italian teams, and Italian defence is generally considered historically the best in the world. A women's team, an under-21 team, an under-20 team, an under-19 team, and an under-17 team also compete. Their honours include:

Competition	1st place, gold medalist(s)	2nd place, silver medalist(s)	3rd place, bronze medalist(s)	Total
World Cup	4	2	1	7
Olympic Games	1	0	2	3
Confederations Cup	0	0	1	1
European Championship	2	2	1	5
Central European International Cup	2	2	0	4
Total	9	6	5	20

=== World Champions squads ===
- 1934 FIFA World Cup squad
- 1938 FIFA World Cup squad
- 1982 FIFA World Cup squad
- 2006 FIFA World Cup squad

=== European Champions squads ===
- UEFA Euro 1968 squad
- UEFA Euro 2020 squad

== European competitions for clubs ==
- 9 Intercontinental/Club World Cups won in 13 finals (tied for third behind Spain and Brazil)
- 12 UEFA European Cups/Champions Leagues won in 30 finals (third behind Spain and England)
- 7 UEFA Cup Winners' Cups won in 11 finals (tied for second behind England)
- 10 UEFA Cups/Europa Leagues won in 18 finals (third behind Spain and England)
- 1 UEFA Conference League won in 3 finals (tied for second behind England)
- 9 UEFA Super Cups won in 14 finals (third behind Spain and England)

In total:

- Italy, 48 cups and 89 finals (second behind Spain)

=== UEFA Champions League ===
The following teams have reached the final of the UEFA European Cup/Champions League. Bold indicates winners, italics indicates runner-ups.

- Fiorentina (1956–57)
- Internazionale (**1963–64**, **1964–65**, 1966–67, 1971–72, **2009–10**, 2022–23, 2024–25)
- Juventus (1972–73, 1982–83, **1984–85**, **1995–96**, 1996–97, 1997–98, 2002–03, 2014–15, 2016–17)
- Milan (1957–58, **1962–63**, **1968–69**, **1988–89**, **1989–90**, 1992–93, **1993–94**, 1994–95, **2002–03**, 2004–05, **2006–07**)
- Roma (1983–84)
- Sampdoria (1991–92)

== Italian football stadiums ==
Stadiums with a capacity of 40,000 or higher are included.

No.	Image	Stadium	Capacity	City	Region	Home team	Opened	Renovated	Notes
1		San Siro	80,018	Milan	Lombardy	Milan and Inter	1926	1935, 1955, 1990, 2015–2016	UEFA Category 4 stadium
2		Stadio Olimpico	70,634	Rome	Lazio	Roma and Lazio	1937	1953, 1990	UEFA Category 4 stadium
3		Stadio San Nicola	58,270	Bari	Apulia	Bari	1990		UEFA Category 3 stadium
4		Stadio Diego Armando Maradona	54,726	Naples	Campania	Napoli	1959	1990, 2010, 2019	
5		Stadio Artemio Franchi	43,147	Florence	Tuscany	Fiorentina	1931	1990	
6		Juventus Stadium	41,570	Turin	Piedmont	Juventus	2011		UEFA Category 4 stadium

== Attendances ==
The average attendance per top-flight football league season and the club with the highest average attendance:

Season	League average	Best club	Best club average
2024–25	30,752	Milan	71,544
2023–24	30,967	Inter	72,838
2022–23	29,551	Inter	72,630
2021–22	—	—	—
2020–21	—	—	—
2019–20	27,469	Inter	65,800
2018–19	25,258	Inter	58,789
2017–18	24,706	Inter	57,529
2016–17	22,047	Inter	46,622
2015–16	22,162	Inter	45,538
2014–15	22,057	Roma	40,135
2013–14	23,310	Inter	46,246
2012–13	23,195	Inter	46,551
2011–12	22,466	Milan	49,020
2010–11	24,306	Inter	59,697
2009–10	24,957	Inter	56,195
2008–09	25,045	Milan	59,731
2007–08	23,180	Milan	56,642
2006–07	18,473	Inter	48,284
2005–06	21,698	Milan	59,993
2004–05	25,472	Milan	63,595
2003–04	25,469	Milan	63,245
2002–03	25,474	Inter	61,943
2001–02	26,019	Inter	62,434
2000–01	29,598	Roma	67,270
1999–2000	29,908	Inter	66,546
1998–99	30,841	Inter	68,459
1997–98	31,160	Inter	67,825
1996–97	29,476	Milan	55,894
1995–96	29,447	Milan	60,973
1994–95	29,154	Milan	56,659
1993–94	29,884	Milan	65,708
1992–93	32,607	Milan	75,830
1991–92	34,204	Milan	77,868
1990–91	33,254	Milan	77,488
1989–90	27,133	Milan	59,054
1988–89	29,454	Milan	72,309
1987–88	30,633	Napoli	73,738
1986–87	33,086	Napoli	72,714
1985–86	35,882	Napoli	71,454
1984–85	38,872	Napoli	77,597
1983–84	36,552	Napoli	55,590
1982–83	33,019	Napoli	58,744
1981–82	31,942	Napoli	58,267
1980–81	27,646	Napoli	56,807
1979–80	30,983	Napoli	55,535
1978–79	32,858	Napoli	59,359
1977–78	34,154	Napoli	61,612
1976–77	32,316	Napoli	71,182
1975–76	32,177	Napoli	75,268
1974–75	31,258	Napoli	67,678
1973–74	34,914	Napoli	62,665
1972–73	32,176	Milan	53,977
1971–72	29,559	Napoli	53,923
1970–71	30,805	Milan	53,319
1969–70	30,134	Napoli	55,025
1968–69	28,410	Napoli	67,079
1967–68	26,507	Napoli	66,541
1966–67	23,818	Napoli	75,797
1965–66	24,524	Napoli	67,977
1964–65	20,321	Inter	45,012
1963–64	21,617	Inter	43,328
1962–63	22,363	Inter	46,637

== See also ==
- List of football stadiums in Italy
- Women's football in Italy
- History of the first football clubs in Italy
