= 1904 Prima Categoria =

7th season of top-tier Italian football

Prima Categoria
- Season: 1903–04
- Champions: Genoa; 6th title

The 1904 Prima Categoria was the seventh edition of the Italian Football Championship, and the first branded Prima Categoria. Genoa retained the title, their sixth from the seven Italian football championships held up til then.

== Format ==
It was contested by 5 clubs from 3 Northern Italian regions. Two Lombardy clubs and two Piedmont clubs played each other to decide which club would represent its region in a semi-final against the team from the other of they two region. The semi-final winner then played the reigning champions, Genoa C.F.C. in a final.

== Qualifications ==
Played on 6 March

Team 1	Score	Team 2
Juventus	3-2	FBC Torinese
Milan	1-0	Andrea Doria

== Semifinal ==
Played on 13 March

Team 1	Score	Team 2
Milan	1-1 (aet)	Juventus

Repetition
Played on 20 March

Team 1	Score	Team 2
Milan	0-3	Juventus

== Final ==
Played on 27 March

Team 1	Score	Team 2
Genoa	1-0	Juventus

== References and sources ==
- Almanacco Illustrato del Calcio - La Storia 1898-2004, Panini Edizioni, Modena, September 2005
