= Armida Rowing Club =

Italian rowing club

- Motto: fortiter constanter
- Location: Turin, Italian
- Home water: River Po
- Founded: 1869
- Key people: Gian Luigi Favero (President); Walter Bottega (Chief Coach); Matteo Motta (Coach)
- University: University of Turin
- Affiliations: Italian Rowing Federation
- Website: www.canottieriarmida.it

Notable members
- Edoardo Bosio

The Armida Rowing Club (ARC) is one of the first Italian rowing clubs, founded in Turin in 1869.

== History ==
In the late 19th century several sports clubs were established by the generic name of 'Canottieri' (Rowers) in the Valentino Park in Turin. In 1869 the Canottieri Armida was founded. The original members were a group of young people only inspired by the desire to have fun paddling on the river. This group of young people joined a company called Flik and Flok in 1863. Originally called Mek-Mek, the Canottieri Armida was formed through its merger with Flik and Flok in 1869.

The sports club took the name Armida on 25 February 1874 and a few months later - on 17 May 1874 - its first real social statute was approved. As a result of the strict rules imposed by it such as the prohibition of intemperance, the obligation of proper behaviour and correct ways of speaking, the duty of good conduct, the ban of gambling in addition to the self-discipline required for rowing and swimming competitively, the Armida Rowing Club was able to reach the top of the Italian rowing throughout its history.

In 1888 the Armida Rowing Club contributed with other rowing clubs to the establishment of the Italian Rowing Club, nowadays known as the Italian Rowing Federation.

In 1967 the Armida Rowing Club was awarded with the Golden Star for sporting merits by the Italian National Olympic Committee (CONI).

The Armida Rowing Club debuted in an official match in 1877. The achieved results were so disappointing that it was only in 1881 that the club returned to the competitions. The first major victory occurred in the fall of 1884: Gillardi won the first prize in the men's single scull race, Nicola in turn dominated the skiff race.

In 1889 the Armida Rowing Club introduced one of the best rowing boats designed for four persons at the time, the Savoia. Its crew consisted of the stroke Alessandro Rigat, Vittorio Nicola, Edoardo Bosio, Giuseppe Capellaro and the cox Andrea Marchisio. The Savoia's crew became the Italian champion on several occasions and also won the Queen's Cup for two consecutive years.

In 2006 the Armida Rowing Club resumed the ancient tradition of Venetian rowing, organizing courses and events in order to promote it.

The Armida Rowing Club hosts the well renowned regatta event Trofeo sull'Acqua, which takes place in the fishpond of the Palace of Venaria.

== The venue ==
The complex of social facilities of the Armida Rowing Club was always located in the Valentino Park. The venue offers a meeting place from which it is possible to enjoy peacefully one of the most suggestive sceneries of Turin since 140 years.

The main building, which was once the home of the "Pavilion of French Colonies" during the World Exhibition of 1911, is today supervised by the government department responsible for the environment and historical buildings.
