= 1903 Italian Football Championship =

6th season of top-tier Italian football

Italian Football Championship
- Season: 1902–03
- Champions: Genoa; 5th title

The 1903 Italian Football Championship was the sixth edition of that competition. That was Genoa's fifth win of the competition.

== Format ==
It was contested by six clubs from 3 regions of Northern Italy. Juventus knocked out two other Piedmont clubs before knocking out a team from Liguria to decide who would play a semi-final against Lombardy club, AC Milan. Juve then lost the final played at home of reigning champions, Genoa CFC.

== Qualifications ==
Team 1	Score	Team 2
Juventus	5-0	FBC Torinese
Juventus	2-1	Audace Torino
Juventus	7-1	Andrea Doria

== Semifinal ==
Team 1	Score	Team 2
Milan	0-2	Juventus

== Final ==
Played on 13 April

Team 1	Score	Team 2
Genoa	3-0	Juventus

== References and sources ==
- Almanacco Illustrato del Calcio - La Storia 1898-2004, Panini Edizioni, Modena, September 2005
