= Italian Gymnastics Federation =

Governing body for gymnastics in Italy

- Formation: 15 March 1869, Venice
- Purpose: Sport governing body
- Main organ: Board of Directors
- Parent organization: International Federation of Gymnastics
- Website: www.federginnastica.it/

The Italian Gymnastics Federation (Italian: Federazione Ginnastica d'Italia) is the national governing body for gymnastics in Italy. Founded in 1869, the federation celebrated its 150th anniversary in 2019.

== International competition ==
The Italian Gymnastics Federation is a member of the European umbrella organization European Union of Gymnastics as well as the World Association for International Gymnastics Federation

The Italian Gymnastics Federation is the only gymnastics association part of the Italian Olympic Committee authorized to send athletes to the Olympic Games.
