= 1902 Italian Football Championship =

5th season of top-tier Italian football

Italian Football Championship
- Season: 1901–02
- Champions: Genoa; 4th title

The 1902 Italian Football Championship was the fifth edition of that competition. Genoa C.F.C. regained the title having lost in the previous season's final to AC Milan. Milan did not defend their title. This was Genoa's fourth win of this championship.

== Format ==
It was expanded to include seven clubs, like most previous season coming from three Northern Italian regions. 4 Piedmont clubs played a round robin that required a tie break to decide who would go through to the final. Two clubs from Liguria and one from Lombardy contested a knock out competition to decide the finalist from the three of them.

== Qualifications ==
=== Group Piedmont ===
==== Final classification ====
| Pos | Team | Pld | W | D | L | GF | GA | GD | Pts | Qualification |
|---|---|---|---|---|---|---|---|---|---|---|
| 1 | FBC Torinese | 3 | 2 | 1 | 0 | 5 | 1 | +4 | 5 | Tie-break required |
| 1 | Juventus | 3 | 2 | 1 | 0 | 9 | 1 | +8 | 5 | Tie-break required |
| 3 | Audace Torino | 3 | 1 | 0 | 2 | 5 | 10 | −5 | 2 | |
| 4 | Ginnastica Torino | 3 | 0 | 0 | 3 | 2 | 9 | −7 | 0 | |

Source: Panini

==== Results ====
| Team 1 | Score | Team 2 |
|---|---|---|
| FBC Torinese | 1-1 | Juventus |
| Audace Torino | 5-2 | Ginnastica Torino |
| Juventus | 6-0 | Audace Torino |
| FBC Torinese | 2-0 | Ginnastica Torino |
| FBC Torinese | 2-0 | Audace Torino |
| Juventus | 2-0 | Ginnastica Torino |

==== Tie-breaker ====
| Team 1 | Score | Team 2 |
|---|---|---|
| FBC Torinese | 4-1 | Juventus |

=== Group Liguria and Lombardy ===
| Team 1 | Score | Team 2 |
|---|---|---|
| Genoa | 3-1 | Andrea Doria |
| Genoa | 2-0 | Mediolanum |

== Semifinal ==
Played on 6 April

| Team 1 | Score | Team 2 |
|---|---|---|
| FBC Torinese | 3-4 | Genoa |

== Final ==
Played on 13 April

| Team 1 | Score | Team 2 |
|---|---|---|
| Genoa | 2-0 | Milan |

== References and sources ==
- Almanacco Illustrato del Calcio - La Storia 1898-2004, Panini Edizioni, Modena, September 2005
