= Velodrome Humbert I =

Sports venue in Turin, Italy

- Velodromo Umberto I
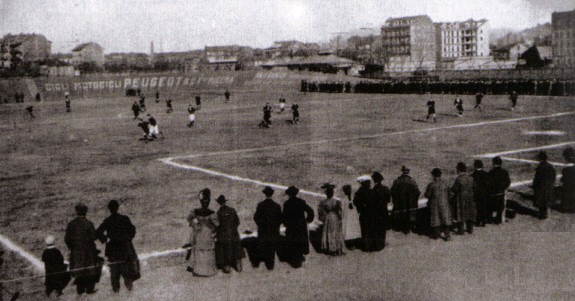
- Interactive map of Velodrome Humbert I
- Location: Turin, Italy
- Owner: City of Turin
- Capacity: 15,000

Construction
- Opened: 1895
- Closed: 1917

Tenants
- Previous tenants include; F.B.C. Torinese; Juventus; Torino

Velodrome Humbert I, commonly known in Italian as Velodromo Umberto I, was an early cycling velodrome and, from 1898, a football ground in Turin. The velodrome was named in honour of then King Humbert I of Savoy. During its time in use it was used by several clubs, it was located within the La Crocetta neighbourhood of Turin, within the Corso Re Umberto park near Mauriziano hospital.

The velodrome is noted for been the host of the first Italian Football Championship in 1898. Thus, the first Italian Championship game was played there on the 8 May 1898 between Internazionale Torino and FBC Torinese. It ended 1-0 to Internazionale, but Genoa won the competition overall.

Its first permanent footballing tenants were FBC Torinese who used it from April 1900 until 1904. From 1904, until 1906 it became the homeground of Juventus; this included the 1905 season in which they won their first scudetto.

When Alfred Dick left Juventus to form a new team called Torino FBC, they would play at the ground since Dick held the lease. They played their earliest seasons here, before changing ground in early 1910.
