= Internazionale FC Torino =

Italian football club

Internazionale Torino
- Full name: Internazionale Football Club Torino
- Founded: 1891
- Dissolved: 1900
- Ground: Campo di Piazza d'Armi, Turin
- Capacity: unknown
- League: Italian Football Championship
- 1899: 2nd
Home colours	Away colours

Internazionale Football Club Torino commonly known as just Internazionale Torino was an Italian football club from Turin. The club was founded by a merger in 1891 and was among the earliest football clubs in Italy, and may have been the earliest known Italian club whose official name included the term “football”.

== Origins of the club ==
Two older clubs in Turin existed before this one, they were mixed sports clubs who competed in football as well as other sports. They were formed respectively in 1887 and 1889, and were called Torino Football and Cricket Club and Nobili Torino. The former was founded by Edoardo Bosio, a merchant worker in the British textile industry, who had brought the game back to Turin after experiencing it in England; this was most likely the first ever Italian club to participate in organised football. Their original colours were red and black stripes. The second club, whose name meant "Turin Nobles", bore the name of noble because it contained the Duke of the Abruzzi and Alfonso Ferrero di Ventimiglia (who would later become a president of FIGC). The colours of Nobili Torino were amber and black stripes. The two clubs merged in 1891 to form Internazionale Torino, taking on the colours of Nobili.

=== Italian Football Championship ===
Along with Genoa and two other Torinese clubs which had sprung up since Internazionale's founding, FBC Torinese and Ginnastica Torino; Internazionale Torino competed in the first ever Italian Football Championship in 1898. The competition was staged at Velodromo Umberto I in Turin, they took part in the first ever Italian Championship game when they beat FBC Torinese 1–0. In the final against Genoa, the match ended 1–1 and as thus went into extra time, Genoa scored two more and ended the game 3–1 meaning Internazionale Torino were runners-up.

The club returned for a second season, beating Ginnastica Torino 2–0 at the Campo Piazza d’Armi in Turin, to once again qualify for the final against rivals Genoa. The game against Genoa ended in a 3–1 defeat at Ponte Carrega in Genoa with Albert Weber scoring for Internazionale. From two seasons in the league, the club ended as runners-up in both.

During 1900 the club merged with Football Club Torinese, and the resulting club kept the Torinese name.

== Honours ==
Italian Football Championship

- Runners-up: 1898, 1899
