= 1899 Italian Football Championship =

2nd season of top-tier Italian football

Italian Football Championship
- Season: 1898–99
- Dates: 2 April 1899 – 16 April 1899
- Champions: Genoa; 2nd title
- Matches played: 3
- Goals scored: 8 (2.67 per match)

The 1899 Italian Football Championship was the second edition of the Italian Football Championship. Genoa retained the trophy they won the previous year.

== Format ==
Unlike the original competition the year before, games in the competition did not all take place on the same day. Knock out format was retained from the year before. The competition was scheduled to be contested by five clubs (two from Liguria and three from Piedmont). However one of the Liguria clubs retired meaning that for the second year, four teams again took part.

== Qualifications ==
=== Liguria ===
Genoa waited for their opponents, a team from near Sampierdarena, on 27 March, but this team retired giving Genoa passage to the final.

=== Piedmont ===
Played 2 April

Team 1	Score	Team 2
Ginnastica Torino	2–0 (aet)	FBC Torinese

Played 9 April

Team 1	Score	Team 2
Internazionale Torino	2–0	Ginnastica Torino

== Final ==
Played 16 April

Team 1	Score	Team 2
Genoa	3–1	Internazionale Torino

== References and sources ==
- Almanacco Illustrato del Calcio - La Storia 1898-2004, Panini Edizioni, Modena, September 2005
