= 1900 Italian Football Championship =

3rd season of top-tier Italian football

Italian Football Championship
- Season: 1899–1900
- Champions: Genoa; 3rd title

The 1900 Italian Football Championship was the third edition of the Italian Football Championship. Genoa won their third consecutive title.

== Format ==
The competition expanded from previous years to now feature six clubs from three Northern Italian regions. Three Piedmont clubs played a round robin to decide which of the three would play in the final. AC Milan (representing Lombardy), joined as semi-finalist playing the winners of the game between two Liguria clubs.

== Qualifications ==
=== Piedmont ===
Final classification

Pos	Team	Pld	W	D	L	GF	GA	GD	Pts	Qualification
1	FBC Torinese	4	4	0	0	8	2	+6	8	Qualified for Semi-Finals
2	Juventus	4	2	0	2	5	3	+2	4	
3	Ginnastica Torino	4	0	0	4	1	9	−8	0	

Source: Panini

Results

Team 1	Score	Team 2
FBC Torinese	3–1	Ginnastica Torino
Juventus	0–1	FBC Torinese
Ginnastica Torino	0–2	Juventus
Ginnastica Torino	0–2	FBC Torinese
Juventus	2–0	Ginnastica Torino
FBC Torinese	2–1	Juventus

=== Liguria ===
Team 1	Score	Team 2
Genoa	7–0	Sampierdarenese

=== Lombardy ===
Milan was the only registered team. The team was admitted directly to Round 2.

== Semi-final ==
Played on 15 April

Team 1	Score	Team 2
FBC Torinese	3–0	Milan

== Final ==
Played on 22 April in Turin

Team 1	Score	Team 2
FBC Torinese	1–3 (a.e.t.)	Genoa

== References and sources ==
- Almanacco Illustrato del Calcio - La Storia 1898-2004, Panini Edizioni, Modena, September 2005
