= FBC Torinese =

Italian football club

- Full name: Foot-Ball Club Torinese
- Founded: 1894
- Dissolved: 1906
- Ground: Velodromo Umberto I, Turin
- Capacity: unknown
- League: Italian Football Championship
- 1905: Qualification Round
Home colours	Away colours

Foot-Ball Club Torinese was an Italian football club from Turin that was founded in 1894. It merged with Internazionale Torino in 1900, keeping its name. The club competed in the first Italian Football Championship, and stayed in the competition until the club dissolved in 1906, allowing the creation of Torino F.C. with the support of some Juventus dissidents.

== Italian Football Championship ==
The club was the fourth oldest club in the history of Turin football, founded in 1894 the club wore similar colours to their local rivals Internazionale Torino with amber and black striped shirts with black socks, Internazionale wore white shorts, while Torinese wore black however.

The club was one of four that took part in the first ever Italian Football Championship during 1898. Torinese were narrowly knocked out, 2–1 by Internazionale in the semi-finals. They had similar results in the second season, losing out early in the competition to Ginnastica Torino (another Torinese club).

In 1900, a merger took place where Internazionale Torino joined with Torinese; they kept they Torinese name. This proved to be a sensible move as that season it saw the club reaching the final of the Italian Championship for the first time; on the way they knocked out Juventus and Milan, the latter of which was achieved with an Edoardo Bosio hat-trick. The final took place against Genoa, after full-time it was 1–1, but the Genovese scored two goals in extra time to seal the title.

After a season of absence the club returned to the growing league for 1902, they were involved in two high-scoring matches, the first of which was a 4–1 victory over Juventus, the second was a 4–3 loss in the semi-finals to eventual champions Genoa. Their final two seasons in the league were considerably less successful as they were put out by Juventus both times.

=== Becoming defunct ===
In 1906, some members of the Juventus (fellow Turin club) board were considering moving the bianconeri out of Turin. This caused a large argument within the club. The president Alfred Dick left with several high-key players to form Football Club Torino. Many players from Torinese were lured to sign for the new FBC Torino and with a shortage of top players, Torinese became defunct.

== Honours ==
Italian Football Championship

- Runners-up: 1900
