= 1898 Italian Football Championship =

1st season of top-tier Italian football

Italian Football Championship
- The trophy
- Season: 1898
- Dates: 8 May 1898
- Champions: Genoa; 1st title
- Matches played: 3
- Goals scored: 8 (2.67 per match)

The 1898 Italian Football Championship is considered a seminal event in Italian football history. It was the first FIGC-endorsed championship considered an official predecessor of Serie A subsequently formed in 1929. Winners Genoa were thus the first ever Italian Football Champions.

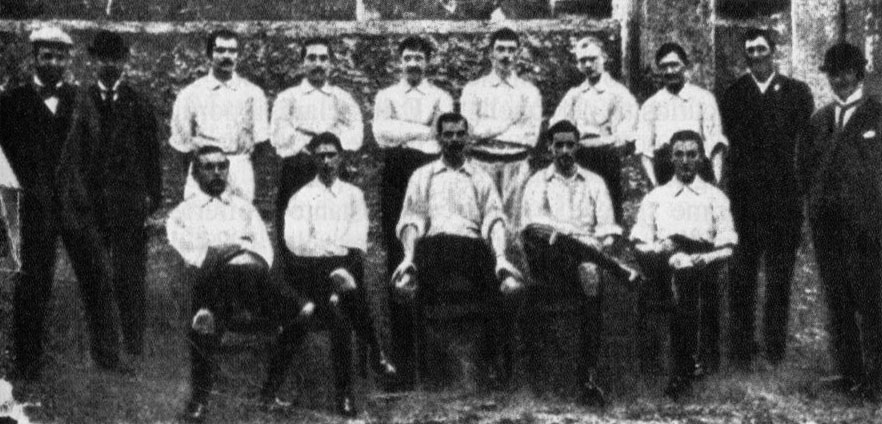
The winners

== Format ==
The 1898 competition was a knock-out tournament involving three Turin clubs and one from Genoa. All three matches were played at the Velodromo Umberto I in Turin on 8 May, over the course of the one day.

== Results ==
=== Semifinals ===
All matches played on 8 May 1898

9:00

Internazionale Torino	2–1	FBC Torinese

Velodrome Humbert I, Turin
Attendance: 50
Referee: Adolf Jourdan

11:00

Ginnastica Torino	0–2	Genoa

Velodrome Humbert I, Turin
Attendance: 50
Referee: Adolf Jourdan

=== Final ===
15:00

Internazionale Torino	1–2 (a.e.t.)	Genoa

Velodrome Humbert I, Turin
Attendance: 100
Referee: Adolf Jourdan
