= 2000–01 Serie A =

99th season of top-tier Italian football

Serie A
- Season: 2000–01
- Dates: 30 September 2000 – 17 June 2001
- Champions: Roma; 3rd title
- Relegated: Reggina; Vicenza; Napoli; Bari
- Champions League: Roma; Juventus; Lazio; Parma
- UEFA Cup: Internazionale; Milan; Fiorentina
- Intertoto Cup: Brescia
- Matches: 306
- Goals: 845 (2.76 per match)
- Top goalscorer: Hernán Crespo (26 goals)
- Average attendance: 29,441

The 2000–01 Serie A (known as the Serie A TIM for sponsorship reasons) was the 99th season of top-tier Italian football, the 69th in a round-robin tournament. It was contested by 18 teams, for the 13th consecutive season since 1988–89.

Roma won its first Scudetto since 1982–83, its third title overall. Juventus finished second, and these two teams automatically qualified for the first group stage of the 2001–02 UEFA Champions League. Lazio, the defending champions, and Parma finished third and fourth respectively, to enter the third qualifying round of the same competition. Internazionale and Milan finished fifth and sixth respectively, and qualified for the 2001–02 UEFA Cup along with Fiorentina, the winners of the Coppa Italia. Brescia gained entry into the 2001 UEFA Intertoto Cup.

Vicenza, Napoli and Bari were automatically relegated to Serie B. Reggina and Hellas Verona were forced to contest a relegation tie-breaker after finishing level on points, with Verona winning on away goals to relegate Reggina.

== Rule changes ==
In the middle of the season, the old quota system was abolished, meaning that each team was no longer limited to having no more than five non-EU players and using no more than three in each match.

== Passport scandal ==
Concurrent with the abolition of the quota system, the Italian Football Federation (FIGC) investigated footballers from South America and Cameroon who had used fake passports in order to enable their teams to field them as Europeans. Alberto, Warley, Alejandro Da Silva and Jorginho of Udinese, Fábio Júnior and Gustavo Bartelt of Roma, Dida of Milan, Álvaro Recoba of Inter, Thomas Job, Francis Zé and Jean Ondoa of Sampdoria, and Jeda and André Leone of Vicenza were all handed bans in July 2001, ranging from six months to one year. However, most of these bans were subsequently reduced.

== Personnels and sponsoring ==
2000–01 Serie A team distribution

Team	Head coach	Kit manufacturer	Shirt sponsor
Atalanta*	(Italy) Giovanni Vavassori	Asics	Ortobell
Bari	(Italy) Arcangelo Sciannimanico	Lotto	TELE+
Bologna	(Italy) Francesco Guidolin	Umbro	Granarolo
Brescia*	(Italy) Carlo Mazzone	Garman	Ristora
Fiorentina	(Italy) Roberto Mancini	Diadora	Toyota
Hellas Verona	(Italy) Attilio Perotti	Lotto	NET Business
Internazionale	(Italy) Marco Tardelli	Nike	Pirelli
Juventus	(Italy) Carlo Ancelotti	Lotto (Note: The CiaoWeb logo was featured instead of the Lotto logo in Serie A and UEFA matches.)	TELE+/sportal.com (in UEFA matches)
Lazio	(Italy) Dino Zoff	Puma	Siemens Mobile
Lecce	(Italy) Alberto Cavasin	Asics	Banca 121
Milan	(Italy) Cesare Maldini	Adidas	Opel
Napoli*	(Italy) Emiliano Mondonico	Diadora	Peroni
Parma	(Italy) Renzo Ulivieri	Champion	Mr.Day (Home)/Parmalat (Away)
Perugia	(Italy) Serse Cosmi	Galex	Daewoo Matiz
Roma	(Italy) Fabio Capello	Kappa	INA Assitalia
Reggina	(Italy) Franco Colomba	Asics	Caffè Mauro
Udinese	(Italy) Luciano Spalletti	Diadora	Telit
Vicenza*	(Italy) Edoardo Reja	Umbro	Artel Clima

(*) Promoted from Serie B.

== Managerial changes ==
Team	Outgoing manager	Manner of departure	Date of vacancy	Position in table	Incoming manager	Date of appointment
Fiorentina	(Italy) Giovanni Trapattoni	End of contract	30 June 2000	Pre-season	(Turkey) Fatih Terim	1 July 2000
Perugia	(Italy) Carlo Mazzone	End of contract	30 June 2000	Pre-season	(Italy) Serse Cosmi	1 July 2000
Brescia	(Italy) Nedo Sonetti	End of contract	30 June 2000	Pre-season	(Italy) Carlo Mazzone	1 July 2000
Napoli	(Italy) Walter Novellino	End of contract	30 June 2000	Pre-season	(Czech Republic) Zdeněk Zeman	1 July 2000
Internazionale	(Italy) Marcello Lippi	Sacked	10 October 2000	15th	(Italy) Marco Tardelli	11 October 2000
Napoli	(Czech Republic) Zdeněk Zeman	Sacked	14 November 2000	18th	(Italy) Emiliano Mondonico	15 November 2000
Lazio	(Sweden) Sven-Göran Eriksson	Resigned	9 January 2001	5th	(Italy) Dino Zoff	10 January 2001
Parma	(Italy) Alberto Malesani	Sacked	10 January 2001	10th	(Italy) Arrigo Sacchi (caretaker)	10 January 2001
Parma	(Italy) Arrigo Sacchi	End of caretaker spell	29 January 2001	8th	(Italy) Renzo Ulivieri	30 January 2001
Fiorentina	(Turkey) Fatih Terim	Sacked	27 February 2001	10th	(Italy) Luciano Chiarugi (caretaker)	28 February 2001
Fiorentina	(Italy) Luciano Chiarugi	End of caretaker spell	6 March 2001	11th	(Italy) Roberto Mancini	7 March 2001
Milan	(Italy) Alberto Zaccheroni	Sacked	12 March 2001	9th	(Italy) Cesare Maldini	13 March 2001
Udinese	(Italy) Luigi De Canio	Sacked	20 March 2001	12th	(Italy) Luciano Spalletti	21 March 2001
Bari	(Italy) Eugenio Fascetti	Sacked	8 May 2001	18th	(Italy) Arcangelo Sciannimanico	9 May 2001

== League table ==
Pos	Team	Pld	W	D	L	GF	GA	GD	Pts	Qualification or relegation
1	Roma (C)	34	22	9	3	68	33	+35	75	Qualification to Champions League first group stage
2	Juventus	34	21	10	3	61	27	+34	73	Qualification to Champions League first group stage
3	Lazio	34	21	6	7	65	36	+29	69	Qualification to Champions League third qualifying round
4	Parma	34	16	8	10	51	31	+20	56	Qualification to Champions League third qualifying round
5	Internazionale	34	14	9	11	47	47	0	51	Qualification to UEFA Cup first round
6	Milan	34	12	13	9	56	46	+10	49	Qualification to UEFA Cup first round
7	Atalanta	34	10	14	10	38	34	+4	44 (Note: Atalanta finished ahead of Brescia on head-to-head points: Atalanta 2–0 Brescia, Brescia 0–3 Atalanta.)	
8	Brescia (Note: Brescia gained entry to the 2001 UEFA Intertoto Cup after Atalanta declined.)	34	10	14	10	44	42	+2	44	Qualification to Intertoto Cup third round
9	Fiorentina (Note: Fiorentina gained entry to the 2001–02 UEFA Cup as the 2000–01 Coppa Italia champions.)	34	10	13	11	53	52	+1	43	Qualification to UEFA Cup first round
10	Bologna	34	11	10	13	49	53	−4	43	
11	Perugia	34	10	12	12	49	53	−4	42	
12	Udinese	34	11	5	18	49	59	−10	38	
13	Lecce	34	8	13	13	40	54	−14	37 (Note: Lecce finished ahead of Reggina and Hellas Verona on head-to-head points: Lecce: 10 pts, Reggina: 4 pts, Hellas Verona: 2 pts.)	
14	Hellas Verona (Note: Hellas Verona winner of 2000–01 Relegation tie-breaker against Reggina.)	34	10	7	17	40	59	−19	37	Relegation tie-breaker
15	Reggina (R)	34	10	7	17	32	49	−17	37	Serie B after tie-breaker
16	Vicenza (R)	34	9	9	16	37	51	−14	36 (Note: Vicenza finished ahead of Napoli on head-to-head points: Vicenza 2–0 Napoli, Napoli 1–2 Vicenza.)	Relegation to Serie B
17	Napoli (R)	34	8	12	14	35	51	−16	36	Relegation to Serie B
18	Bari (R)	34	5	5	24	31	68	−37	20	Relegation to Serie B

Source: 2000–01 Serie A, Soccerway, RSSSF.com
Rules for classification: 1) Points; 2) Head-to-head points; 3) Head-to-head goal difference; 4) Goal difference; 5) Goals scored; 6) Draw. (Note: Head-to-head record is used only after all the matches between the teams in question have been played).
(C) Champions; (R) Relegated

== Results ==
Home \ Away	ATA	BAR	BOL	BRE	FIO	HEL	INT	JUV	LAZ	LCE	MIL	NAP	PAR	PER	REG	ROM	UDI	VIC
Atalanta		0–0	2–2	2–0	0–0	3–0	0–1	2–1	2–2	1–0	1–1	1–1	0–1	0–0	1–1	0–2	0–1	1–1
Bari	0–2		2–0	1–3	2–1	1–1	1–2	0–1	1–2	3–2	1–3	0–1	0–1	3–4	2–1	1–4	2–1	2–2
Bologna	0–1	4–2		1–0	1–1	1–0	0–3	1–4	2–0	2–2	2–1	2–1	2–1	3–2	2–0	1–2	1–1	1–1
Brescia	0–3 (Note: The match was played at Stadio Giglio.)	3–1	0–0		1–1	1–0	1–0	0–0	0–1	2–2	1–1	1–1	0–0	1–0	4–0	2–4	3–1	2–1
Fiorentina	1–1	2–2	1–1	2–2		2–0	2–0	1–3	1–4	2–0	4–0	1–2	0–1	3–4	2–1	3–1	2–1	3–2
Hellas Verona	2–1	3–2	5–4	2–1	2–1		2–2	0–1	2–0	0–0	1–1	2–1	0–2	2–1	0–3	1–4	1–1	1–0
Internazionale	3–0	1–0	2–1 (Note: The match was played at Stadio San Nicola.)	0–0	4–2	2–0		2–2	1–1 (Note: The match was played at Stadio San Nicola.)	0–1	0–6	3–1	1–1	2–1	1–1	2–0	2–1	1–1
Juventus	2–1	2–0	1–0	1–1	3–3	2–1	3–1		1–1	1–1	3–0	3–0	1–0	1–0	1–0	2–2	1–2	4–0
Lazio	0–0	2–0	2–0	2–1	3–0	5–3	2–0	4–1		3–2	1–1	1–2	1–0	3–0	2–0	0–1	3–1 (Note: The match was played at Stadio Artemio Franchi.)	2–1
Lecce	0–2	2–0	0–0	0–3	1–1	4–2	1–2	1–4	2–1		3–3	1–1	1–2	2–2	2–1	0–4	2–1	3–1
Milan	3–3	4–0	3–3	1–1	1–2	1–0	2–2	2–2	1–0	4–1		1–0	2–2	1–2	1–0	3–2	3–0	2–0
Napoli	0–0	1–0	1–5	1–1	1–0 (Note: The match was played at Stadio La Favorita.)	2–0	1–0	1–2	2–4	1–1	0–0		2–2	0–0	6–2	2–2	0–1	1–2
Parma	2–0	4–0	0–0	3–0	2–2	1–2	3–1	0–0	2–0	1–1	2–0	4–0		5–0	0–2	1–2	2–0	0–2
Perugia	2–2	4–1	1–3	2–2	2–2	1–0	2–3	0–1	0–1	1–1	2–1	1–1	3–1		1–1	0–0	3–1	1–0
Reggina	1–0	1–0	2–1	0–3	1–1	1–1 (Note: The match was played at Stadio Cibali.)	2–1	0–2	0–2	0–1	2–1	3–1	2–0	0–2		0–0	1–1	1–0
Roma	1–0	1–1	2–0	3–1	1–0	3–1	3–2	0–0	2–2	1–0	1–1	3–0	3–1	2–2	2–1		2–1	3–1
Udinese	2–4	2–0	3–1	4–2	1–3	2–1	3–0	0–2	3–4	2–0	0–1	0–0	1–3	3–3	3–0	1–3		2–3
Vicenza	1–2	1–0	4–2	1–1	1–1	2–2	0–0	0–3	1–4	0–0	2–0	2–0	0–1	1–0	2–1	0–2 (Note: The match was played at Stadio Friuli.)	1–2	

Source: lega-calcio.it (in Italian)
Legend: Blue = home team win; Yellow = draw; Red = away team win.

== Overall records ==
- Highest number of wins: Roma (22)
- Lowest number of losses: Juventus, Roma (3 each)
- Highest number of draws: Atalanta, Brescia (15 each)
- Lowest number of wins: Bari (5)
- Highest number of losses: Bari (24)
- Lowest number of draws: Bari, Udinese (5 each)
- Highest number of goals for: Roma (68)
- Lowest number of goals against: Juventus (27)
- Lowest number of goals for: Bari (31)
- Highest number of goals against: Bari (68)
- Best goal difference: Roma (35)
- Worst goal difference: Bari (−37)

== Relegation tie-breaker ==
21 June 2001

Hellas Verona	1–0	Reggina
Laursen 61'

Stadio Marcantonio Bentegodi, Verona
Attendance: 24,733
Referee: Graziano Cesari (Genoa)

24 June 2001

Reggina	2–1	Hellas Verona
Zanchetta 42'; Cozza 45+1'	Report	Cossato 86'

Stadio Oreste Granillo, Reggio Calabria
Attendance: 26,049
Referee: Stefano Braschi (Prato)

Reggina relegated to Serie B.

== Top goalscorers ==
Rank	Player	Club	Goals
1	(Argentina) Hernán Crespo	Lazio	26
2	(Ukraine) Andriy Shevchenko	Milan	24
3	(Italy) Enrico Chiesa	Fiorentina	22
4	(Argentina) Gabriel Batistuta	Roma	20
5	(Italy) Christian Vieri	Internazionale	18
6	(Italy) Dario Hübner	Brescia	17
7	(Italy) Marco Di Vaio	Parma	15
7	(Italy) Giuseppe Signori	Bologna	15
7	(Argentina) Roberto Sosa	Udinese	15
10	(France) David Trezeguet	Juventus	14
11	(Italy) Francesco Totti	Roma	13
11	(Italy) Vincenzo Montella	Roma	13
13	(Italy) Cristiano Lucarelli	Lecce	12
13	(Italy) Marco Materazzi	Perugia	12
15	(Italy) Filippo Inzaghi	Juventus	11
15	(Croatia) Davor Vugrinec	Lecce	11

== Attendances ==
#	Club	Avg. attendance	Highest
1	AS Roma	67,270	77,120
2	Internazionale	55,582	78,054
3	AC Milan	52,304	81,954
4	SS Lazio	47,492	75,000
5	Juventus FC	41,273	63,548
6	SSC Napoli	38,890	67,927
7	ACF Fiorentina	29,463	39,241
8	Bologna FC	25,786	34,631
9	Reggina Calcio	24,113	28,000
10	Udinese Calcio	20,613	30,031
11	Parma AC	19,008	29,173
12	Atalanta BC	18,662	34,000
13	US Lecce	18,117	30,201
14	Hellas Verona	17,777	26,483
15	Brescia Calcio	16,261	20,819
16	Vicenza Calcio	15,193	18,461
17	AS Bari	13,833	33,900
18	AC Perugia	11,119	28,140

== References and sources ==
- Almanacco Illustrato del Calcio – La Storia 1898-2004, Panini Edizioni, Modena, September 2005

== See also ==
- Tim Parks, A Season with Verona (London: Vintage, 2002) – A personal account by a celebrated English author and fan of the fortunes of Hellas Verona that season, including the team's narrow avoidance of relegation.
