= 2001 European football fake passports scandal =

Attempt to evade non-EU player cap rules

In 2001, a fake passport scandal affected several major football leagues in the European Union, when it was discovered that teams had been evading rules limiting the number of non-European Union players by obtaining fake passports. The story began in Italy, where it is also referred to as Passaportopoli.

The story broke in late 2000, when four South American players of Udinese were found to be using fake Portuguese passports. An Italian Football Federation panel issued fines to clubs including Udinese, Lazio, Inter Milan, AC Milan and Sampdoria. Inter's Álvaro Recoba was banned for a year, reduced to four months on appeal, and pleaded guilty in court and received a fine. Lazio's Juan Sebastián Verón was acquitted by both the league and the judiciary. In France, Saint-Étienne received a seven-point deduction relating to three players, but the action was suspended by a court. Three players from three other clubs received two-year bans from entering France. The scandal also affected Spain and England.

== Italy ==
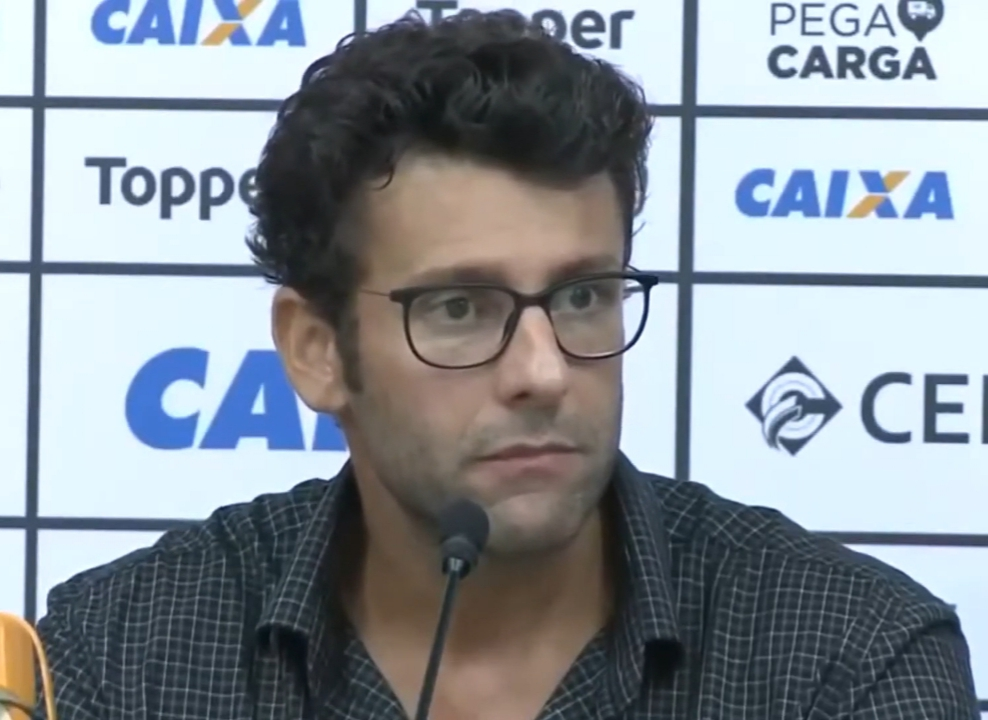
Alberto Valentim was one of two Brazilian Udinese players arrested in Poland for use of a fake Portuguese passport in September 2000, triggering the scandal.

At the time of the scandal, teams in Italy were allowed to start a match with no more than three players without a European Union nationality.

The scandal broke in Italy on 14 September 2000, when Udinese's Brazilian pair Warley and Alberto Valentim were arrested on entry to Poland for possession of fake Portuguese passports. The Italian Football Federation (FIGC) and magistrates in Udine investigated and two more Udinese players – Paraguayan Alejandro da Silva and Brazilian Jorginho Paulista – were ordered to leave Italy. Communication with the Portuguese embassy established that the civil servant alleged to have signed their documents did not exist. The four players were banned for a year in June 2001 and the club fined £1 million.

Lazio midfielder Juan Sebastián Verón, from Argentina, was alleged to have irregularities in his naturalisation as an Italian citizen by descent. In June 2001, the FIGC cleared Verón and club president Sergio Cragnotti, while club director Felicie Pulici was banned for a year and the club was fined £666,000. It was found that Verón and his club had been tricked by intermediaries in order to obtain an Italian passport. In February 2007, Verón, Cragnotti, Pulici and others were acquitted in court, while Buenos Aires lawyer Elena Tedaldi received a suspended sentence of 15 months and Fagnano Castello civil servant Gianfranco Orsomanso was sent to prison for three months; Verón's Italian nationality was revoked.

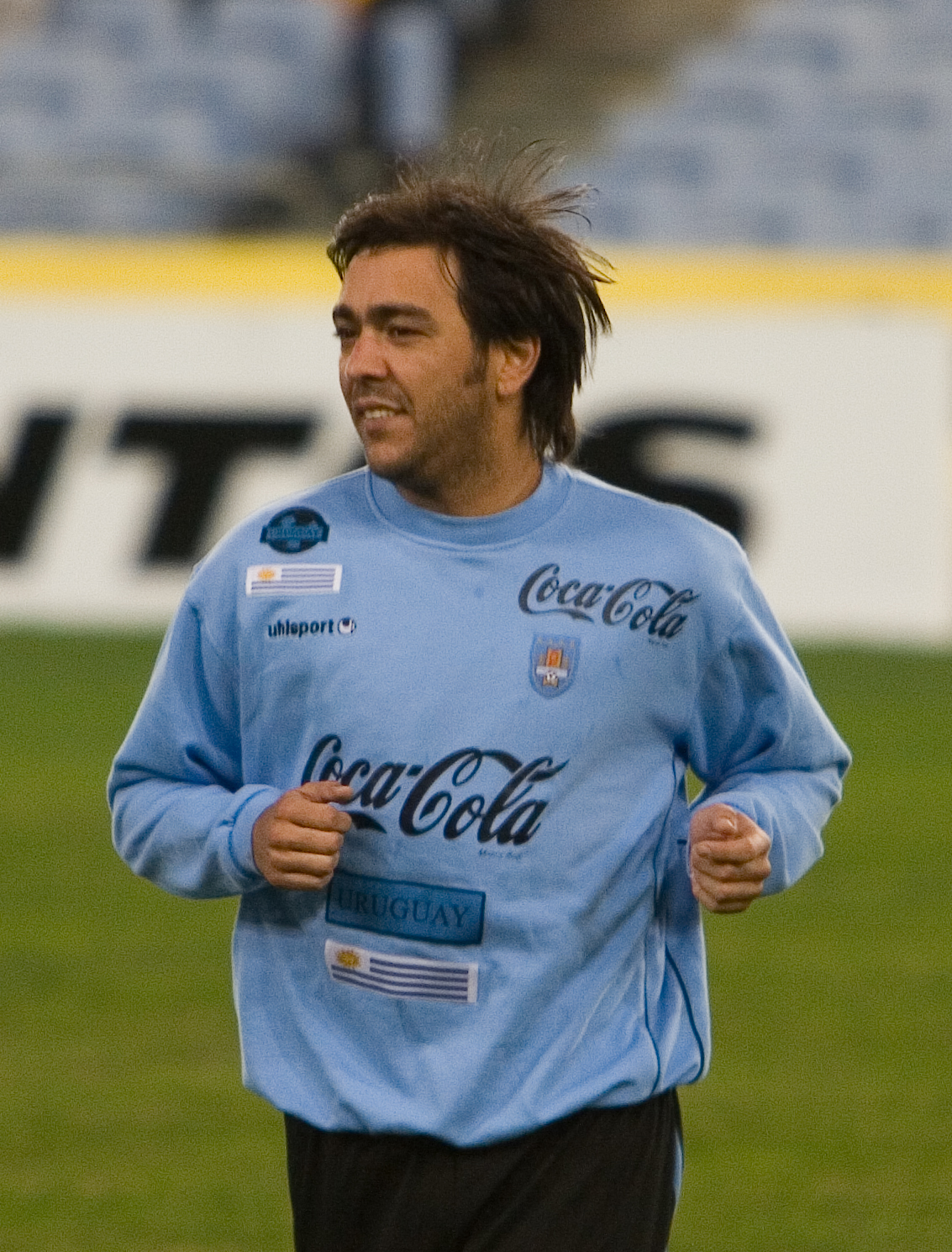
Álvaro Recoba received a suspension from the Italian Football Federation, and pleaded guilty in court in 2006.

Inter Milan player Álvaro Recoba, of Uruguay, was banned for a year in June 2001. On appeal, his suspension was cut to four months in October, provided that he do community service for the league. The club's fine was cut from €1 million to €725,000. In May 2006, Recoba and Inter director Gabriele Oriali pleaded guilty at court in Udine to forgery and receiving stolen goods (an Italian driving licence). Per their plea bargain, a six-month prison sentence was replaced by a €21,420 fine.

Newly crowned Italian champions Roma lost Gustavo Bartelt (Argentina) and Fábio Júnior (Brazil) to year-long suspensions in addition to a £500,000 fine in June 2001. AC Milan goalkeeper Dida was also banned for a year and his club fined £300,000. Sampdoria received a £500,000 and six-month suspensions for Cameroonians Jean Ondoa, Thomas Job and Francis Zé. Brazilians Jeda and Dede of Vicenza were also banned.

During the investigation into Recoba, Inter had been threatened with an eight-point deduction, which could have jeopardised their status as the only team to never be relegated from Serie A. In the end, no club was given a points deduction, a decision criticised by Reggina president Lillo Foti.

== France ==
At the time of the scandal, French teams were permitted to field three players without European Union nationality. In January 2001, relegation-threatened Saint-Étienne was given a seven-point deduction for the fake documentation of two players: Brazilian forward Alex (Portuguese passport) and Ukrainian goalkeeper Maksym Levytskyi (Greek passport) received four-month bans with the latter half a suspended sentence. In May, a civil court suspended the French Football Federation's decision to deduct the points, pending further investigation.

The documents of all 78 non-EU players in Ligue 1 and Ligue 2 were investigated by police. Apart from the Saint-Étienne players, three more players went through disciplinary action: Faryd Mondragón (Colombian playing for Metz on a Greek passport), Pablo Contreras (Chilean playing for Monaco on an Italian passport), and Emiliano Romay (Argentinian playing for Nice on an Italian passport). At a league panel in February, Mondragón was acquitted due to cooperating, while the other two were banned for four months. In April, a court banned all three from entering France for two years and fined them between £15,000 and £30,000; only Mondragón was still playing in France at the time and only he attended the trial. Monaco was also docked two points.

== Spain ==
Real Oviedo midfielder Idrissa Keita, of the Ivory Coast, arrived in Spain in 1997 on a French passport; the French embassy informed the Royal Spanish Football Federation (RFEF) that this was fake. He was withdrawn by the club to be re-registered as one of three non-EU players, and suspended by the league in April.

Alavés goalkeeper Martín Herrera, from Argentina, was suspended for one game until his Italian passport was proven to be legitimate.

Delio Toledo, a Paraguayan player for Espanyol with a Spanish passport, was suspended by the RFEF in February 2001. In July 2002, facing a one-year prison sentence and fine of 1.8 million Spanish pesetas (€10,000), he was acquitted by a criminal court.

== England ==
At the time of the scandal, English football did not have a cap on non-EU players, but required them to be regular international players in order to obtain a work permit. In February 2001, police in England announced an investigation into 80 players born outside the European Union and playing under EU passports.

In September 2001, the Immigration Services announced an investigation into former Arsenal pair Sylvinho (Brazilian on a Portuguese passport) and Tomas Danilevičius (Lithuanian on a Greek passport); they had both already departed to Celta Vigo and Beveren, respectively. Sylvinho said that he had been registered as Portuguese without his knowledge.

Newcastle United player Nolberto Solano had joined the club in 1998 with a work permit due to his international performances for Peru, but was later registered under a Greek passport obtained through ancestry. After a four-year investigation, he was cleared of any wrongdoing in July 2005.
