= Serie A =

Association football league in Italy

- Organising body: Lega Serie A
- Founded: 1898; 128 years ago (as Campionato Italiano di Football); 1929; 97 years ago (as Serie A)
- Country: Italy
- Confederation: UEFA
- President: Ezio Simonelli
- Chief Executive Officer: Luigi De Siervo
- Number of clubs: 20 (since 2004–05)
- Level on pyramid: 1
- Relegation to: Serie B
- Domestic cups: Coppa Italia; Supercoppa Italiana
- International cups: UEFA Champions League; UEFA Europa League; UEFA Conference League
- Current champions: Inter Milan (21st title) (2025–26)
- Most championships: Juventus (36 titles)
- Most appearances: Gianluigi Buffon (657)
- Top scorer: Silvio Piola (274)
- Broadcasters: List of broadcasters
- Sponsor: Enilive
- Website: legaseriea.it
- Current: 2026–27 Serie A

The Serie A (Italian pronunciation: [ˈsɛːrje ˈa]), officially known as Serie A Enilive in Italy and Serie A Made in Italy abroad for sponsorship reasons, is a professional association football league in Italy and the highest level of the Italian football league system. Established in the 1929–30 season, it restructured the existing Italian Football Championship, which had been played since 1898, into a national round-robin format alongside Serie B. It functions under a promotion and relegation system with Serie B.

The league was organised by the Direttorio Divisioni Superiori until 1943, the Lega Calcio from 1946 to 2010, and the Lega Serie A ever since. The 29 championships played from 1898 to the formation of the Serie A in 1929 are officially recognised by the Italian Football Federation (FIGC) as equal to later Serie A titles. Similarly the 1945–46 season, played under a temporary format due to World War II, is also recognized as an official championship. Since 1924, the winner of Italy's top division has worn the scudetto emblem on its kit in the following season, and since 1961, the Coppa Campioni d'Italia trophy has been awarded to the Serie A champion.

The Serie A currently ranks second in the UEFA coefficient rankings as of 2024–25 based on performances in European competitions over the past five seasons, behind England's Premier League and ahead of Spain's La Liga. The league has consistently ranked among the strongest in global football and has historically attracted top global talent, producing numerous Ballon d'Or winners.

The Serie A is home to several of football's most successful and renowned clubs, including Juventus, Inter Milan, and AC Milan. These teams have played key roles in European football governance and competition history. Juventus, the most decorated club in Italy, has achieved international success across all major UEFA and intercontinental tournaments. Milan and Inter have also earned significant honors, with Milan joint-third among clubs for most UEFA titles, and Inter achieving a continental treble in 2009–10. Alongside Roma, Lazio, historically Parma and Fiorentina but now replaced by Napoli and Atalanta, these clubs form the "seven sisters" (sette sorelle) of Italian football. (Note: In the 1990s, when the term originated, Parma was seen as one of the Seven Sisters and Napoli was not included.)

== History ==
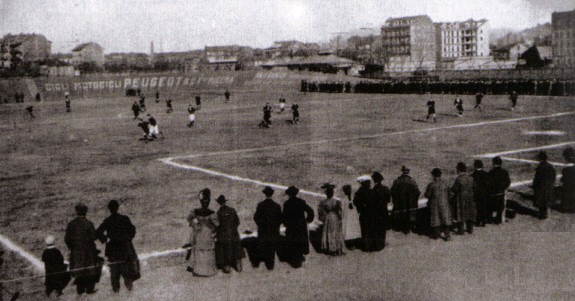
An image of the first Italian championship, held in a single day in Turin on 8 May 1898

Founded in 1898, the Italian championship was initially characterized by amateur organization and limited public interest. During its first two decades, Genoa, the first team to win the Italian championship, and Pro Vercelli were the dominant clubs, winning most of the titles between them. The Italian Football Federation (FIGC) organized the championship from its first edition, except in the 1921–22 season. After the clubs failed to reach an agreement over the proposed progetto Pozzo, two separate tournaments were held, one of which was organized by the Italian Football Confederation (CCI). The following season, the Colombo Compromise ended the split and reunited the competitions.

Until the end of the 1920s, the Italian championship was organized through multiple geographically based groups followed by knockout stages. (Note: Regional groups survived until 1921–22 in the North and 1925–26 in the South. The northern groups from 1921–22 to 1925–26 were drawn without following any geographical criteria, with teams required to travel throughout Northern Italy, including Tuscany. The first national championship was the 1926–27 edition, in which the twenty admitted teams (seventeen from the North and three from the South) were divided into two groups of ten, again without following any geographical criteria. Furthermore, the final stages were not always knockout tournaments: in 1926–27 and 1927–28, the title was awarded through a final group of six or eight teams. The knockout matches were in fact groups consisting of only two teams, in which aggregate score was not taken into account, as the concept had not yet been introduced at the time. Instead, as in any group containing more than two teams, a win was worth two points, a draw one point and a defeat zero. The 1925–26 season was an exception, when the goal quotient was briefly introduced to separate teams level on points (in two-team groups, the team with the better goal quotient was automatically the team that prevailed on aggregate).) Since the introduction of the Scudetto patch in 1925, the championship has also commonly been referred to as the "Scudetto" by metonymy. From the 1929–30 season onward, the championship adopted a single round-robin format, which had already been briefly used in the 1909–10 season, and the name Serie A. (Note: In its first decades, the full name of the top-flight single round-robin championship was Divisione Nazionale Serie A, following the division of Divisione Nazionale, the previous top-level championship, into two single round-robin divisions. During the interwar period, Serie A was one of several abbreviations in use, alongside the less common terms Divisione Nazionale A, Divisione A and Nazionale A. From the postwar period onward, Serie A became the established name, while the full designation gradually fell out of use, including at the official level. It nevertheless continued to appear occasionally, such as in the 1958 FIGC resolution that awarded a star to clubs that had won ten Divisione Nazionale Serie A championships.)

The 1930s marked a significant change in Italian football, both in sporting terms and in its social significance. The period saw the emergence of a sustained dominance by three major clubs, Juventus, Inter Milan, and AC Milan, with Juventus becoming the most successful club in Italy and Inter the only club to have remained continuously in the top flight. Football also attracted an increasingly large following among fans and the mass media, establishing itself as Italy's national sport and overtaking cycling.

The dominance of the Milan–Turin axis was periodically challenged during the interwar period and the postwar period by Bologna and Torino. In subsequent decades, clubs including Fiorentina, Lazio, Roma, and Napoli also won top-flight titles. Roma's 1941–42 championship was the first won by a club from Central or Southern Italy. Other clubs achieved isolated title successes, including Casale and Novese in the early 20th century, the latter during the split between the FIGC and CCI, and Cagliari, Verona, and Sampdoria in the second half of the 20th century.

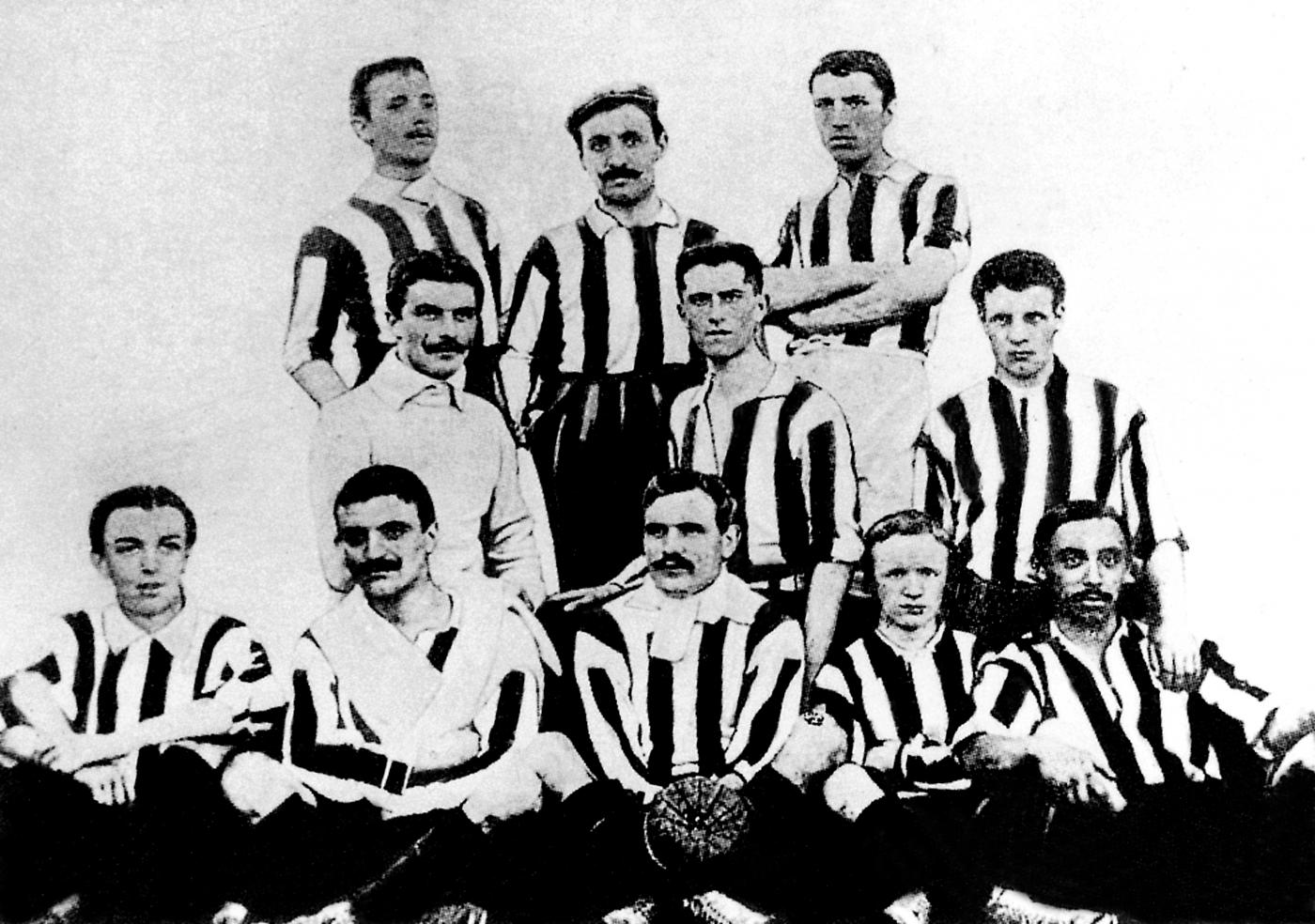
Juventus is the most successful club in Italy, with 36 Scudetti from 1905 (above) to the present day

Serie A experienced a period of decline following the decision by the Lega Nazionale Professionisti to restrict the signing of players and coaches from foreign leagues after the national team's defeat at the 1966 FIFA World Cup in England. The situation was further affected fourteen years later by the first major Italian football betting scandal. The decline continued into the early 1980s, when Italy's top division ranked 12th in Europe for the 1981–82 season, behind leagues such as those of Belgium, the Soviet Union, East Germany, and Czechoslovakia.

Serie A subsequently reached a peak in international prestige and visibility around the late 1980s and early 1990s. The high technical level of the teams was reinforced by the gradual reopening of the league to foreign players, while Italian clubs consistently achieved strong results in European competitions. In the 1989–90 season, Italian clubs won all three major European club competitions, and Serie A subsequently occupied first place in the continental rankings for several seasons. In the 1997–98 season, Serie A qualified a record nine teams for European competitions.

Serie A lost its position at the top of the continental rankings from the second half of the 2000s onward, amid structural problems affecting both sporting matters and off-field issues. It has nevertheless remained one of Europe's major domestic leagues, alongside those of Germany, England, and Spain.

== Format ==
For most of Serie A's history, there were 16 or 18 clubs competing at the top level. Since 2004–05, however, there have been 20 clubs in total. One season (1947–48) was played with 21 teams for political reasons, following post-war tensions with Yugoslavia. Below is a complete record of how many teams played in each season throughout the league's history:

- 18 clubs: 1929–1934
- 16 clubs: 1934–1943
- 20 clubs: 1946–1947
- 21 clubs: 1947–1948
- 20 clubs: 1948–1952
- 18 clubs: 1952–1967
- 16 clubs: 1967–1988
- 18 clubs: 1988–2004
- 20 clubs: 2004–present

Scudetto patch

During the season, which runs from August to May, each club plays each of the other teams twice; once at home and once away, totalling 38 games for each team by the end of the season. Thus, in Italian football a true round-robin format is used. In the first half of the season, called the andata, each team plays once against each league opponent, for a total of 19 games. In the second half of the season, called the ritorno, the teams play another 19 games, once more against each opponent, in which home and away matches are reversed. The two halves of the season had exactly the same order of fixtures until the 2021–22 season, when an asymmetrical calendar was introduced, following the format of the English, Spanish and French leagues. Since the 1994–95 season, teams are awarded three points for a win, one point for a draw, and no points for a loss. Prior to this, a win was worth two points. The three lowest-placed teams at the end of the season are relegated to Serie B, and three Serie B teams are promoted to replace them for the next season.

=== European qualification ===
In 2023–24, Serie A was ranked as the best league by UEFA coefficient. This was due to a combination of all seven Serie A teams progressing into the knockout stages in European competition, picking up extra coefficient points. Additionally, Atalanta won the Europa League Final and Fiorentina were losing finalists in the UEFA Europa Conference League. This continued a strong recent record where five of the six European club finals have featured at least one Serie A side over the past two seasons. As a result of this ranking the top 5 clubs in Serie A qualify for the Champions League in 2024.

=== Tiebreaking ===
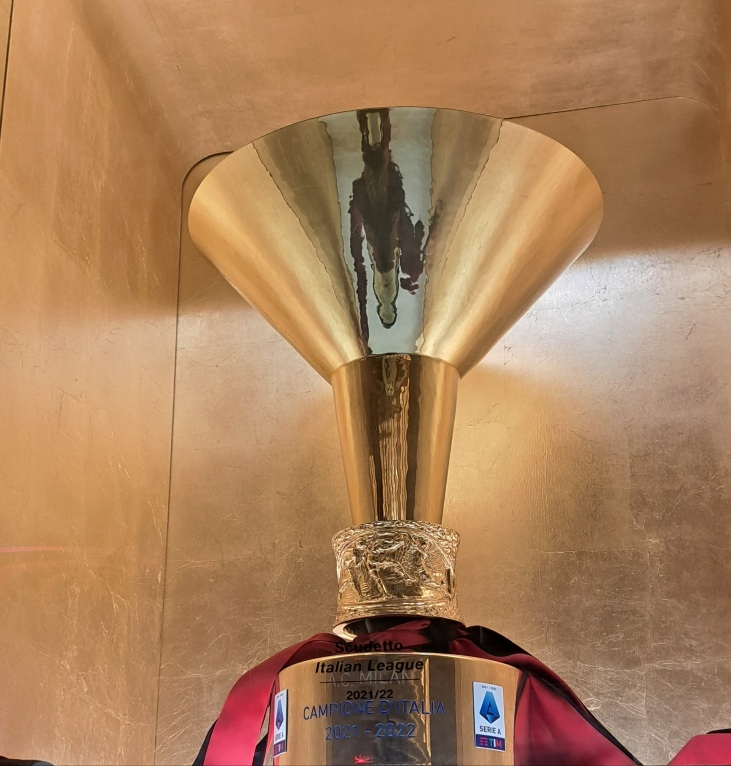
The Serie A championship trophy

If after all 38 games, two teams are tied on points for either first place or for 17th (the last safety spot), the outcome is decided by a single-legged play-off match. This match consists of 90 minutes of regulation time followed by penalties if necessary (no extra time). The game is to be held at a neutral venue, with the designated "home" team determined by the performance-based criteria listed below. In cases where there are at least three teams tied for one of these positions, a mini table is created using the same tiebreakers to determine which two teams will play in the decider. For ties concerning all other league positions, the following tiebreakers are applied:

1. Head-to-head points
2. Goal difference of head-to-head games
3. Goal difference overall
4. Higher number of goals scored
5. Play-off game at a neutral venue if relevant to decide European qualification or relegation; otherwise by coin flip

Between 2006–07 and 2021–22, the tiebreakers currently used for all places to decide the scudetto winner if necessary, though this was never needed. Before 2005–06, a play-off would immediately be used if teams were tied for first place, a European qualification spot, or a relegation spot. In some past years, the playoff was a single game at a neutral site while in others it was a two-legged tie decided by aggregate score.

The only time a playoff was used to decide the champion occurred in the 1963–64 season when Bologna and Inter both finished on 54 points. Bologna won the playoff 2–0 at the Stadio Olimpico in Rome to win the scudetto. Playoff games have been used on multiple occasions to decide European competition qualifications (most recently in 1999–2000) and relegation (most recently in 2022–23).

== Clubs ==
Before 1929, many clubs competed in the top level of Italian football as the earlier rounds were competed up to 1922 on a regional basis then interregional up to 1929. Below is a list of Serie A clubs who have competed in the competition since it has been a league format (68 in total).

=== 2026–27 season ===
==== Clubs ====
The following 20 clubs compete in the Serie A during the 2026–27 season.

Team	Location	Position in 2025–26 season	First season in Serie A	Seasons in Serie A	Serie A titles	First season of current spell	Seasons of current spell	National titles	Manager
Atalanta	Bergamo	7th	1937–38	66	0	2011–12	16	0	Maurizio Sarri
Bologna	Bologna	8th	1929–30	80	5	2015–16	12	7	Raffaele Palladino
Cagliari	Cagliari	14th	1964–65	46	1	2023–24	4	1	Fabio Pisacane
Como	Como	4th	1949–50	16	0	2024–25	3	0	Cesc Fàbregas
Fiorentina	Florence	15th	1931–32	89	2	2004–05	23	2	Paolo Vanoli
Frosinone	Frosinone	2nd (B)	2015–16	4	0	2026–27	1	0	Massimiliano Alvini
Genoa	Genoa	16th	1929–30	59	0	2023–24	4	9	Daniele De Rossi
Inter Milan	Milan	1st	1929–30	95	19	1929–30	95	21	Cristian Chivu
Juventus	Turin	6th	1929–30	94	34	2007–08	20	36	Luciano Spalletti
Lazio	Rome	9th	1929–30	84	2	1988–89	39	2	Gennaro Gattuso
Lecce	Lecce	17th	1985–86	21	0	2022–23	5	0	Eusebio Di Francesco
AC Milan	Milan	5th	1929–30	93	16	1983–84	44	19	Rúben Amorim
Monza	Monza	3rd (B)	2022–23	4	0	2026–27	1	0	Ivan Jurić
Napoli	Naples	2nd	1929–30	81	4	2007–08	20	4	Massimiliano Allegri
Parma	Parma	13th	1990–91	30	0	2024–25	3	0	Alberto Gilardino
Roma	Rome	3rd	1929–30	94	3	1952–53	75	3	Gian Piero Gasperini
Sassuolo	Sassuolo	11th	2013–14	13	0	2025–26	2	0	Alberto Aquilani
Torino	Turin	12th	1929–30	83	5	2012–13	15	7	Ignazio Abate
Udinese	Udine	10th	1950–51	54	0	1995–96	32	0	Paolo Zanetti
Venezia	Venice	1st (B)	1939–40	15	0	2026–27	1	0	Davide Nicola

==== Stadiums ====
Team	Location	Current	Capacity
Atalanta	Bergamo	Stadio di Bergamo	24,950
Bologna	Bologna	Stadio Renato Dall'Ara	38,279
Cagliari	Cagliari	Sardegna Arena	16,416
Como	Como	Stadio Giuseppe Sinigaglia	13,602
Fiorentina	Florence	Stadio Artemio Franchi	43,147
Frosinone	Frosinone	Stadio Benito Stirpe	16,227
Genoa	Genoa	Stadio Luigi Ferraris	36,599
Inter Milan	Milan	Stadio Giuseppe Meazza	80,018
Juventus	Turin	Juventus Stadium	41,507
Lazio	Rome	Stadio Olimpico	70,634
Lecce	Lecce	Stadio Ettore Giardiniero - Via del Mare	31,533
AC Milan	Milan	San Siro	80,018
Monza	Monza	Stadio Brianteo	17,102
Napoli	Naples	Stadio Diego Armando Maradona	54,726
Parma	Parma	Stadio Ennio Tardini	27,906
Roma	Rome	Stadio Olimpico	70,634
Sassuolo	Reggio Emilia	Stadio Città del Tricolore	21,525
Torino	Turin	Stadio Olimpico Grande Torino	27,958
Udinese	Udine	Stadio Friuli	25,144
Venezia	Venice	Stadio Pier Luigi Penzo	12,048

==== Maps ====
Current teams shown in green.

Locations of all 20 current Serie A teams

=== Seasons in Serie A ===
There are 68 teams that have taken part in 95 Serie A championships in a single round that was played from the 1929–30 season until the 2026–27 season. The teams in bold compete in Serie A currently. The year in parentheses represents the most recent year of participation at this level. Inter Milan is the only team that has played Serie A football in every season.

- **95** seasons: **Inter Milan** (2027)
- **94** seasons: **Juventus** (2027), **Roma** (2027)
- **93** seasons: **AC Milan** (2027)
- **89** seasons: **Fiorentina** (2027)
- **84** seasons: **Lazio** (2027)
- **83** seasons: **Torino** (2027)
- **81** seasons: **Napoli** (2027)
- **80** seasons: **Bologna** (2027)
- **66** seasons: Sampdoria (2023), (Note: Pursuant to the Federal Internal Organizational Rules of the Italian Football Federation (NOIF, art. 20, subsection 5), Unione Calcio Sampdoria inherits and continues the sporting tradition of its most valuable ancestor, A.C. Sampierdarenese, which spent 8 seasons in Serie A, for a total of 74 appearances. However, Sampdoria and Sampierdarenese are treated as separate clubs in history and statistics.) **Atalanta** (2027)
- **59** seasons: **Genoa** (2027)
- **54** seasons: **Udinese** (2027)
- **46** seasons: **Cagliari** (2027)
- **35** seasons: Hellas Verona (2026)
- **30** seasons: Vicenza (2001), Bari (2011), **Parma** (2027)
- **29** seasons: Palermo (2017)
- **26** seasons: Triestina (1959)
- **23** seasons: Brescia (2020)
- **21** seasons: **Lecce** (2027)
- **19** seasons: SPAL (2020)
- **18** seasons: Livorno (2014)
- **17** seasons: Catania (2014), ChievoVerona (2019), Empoli (2025)
- **16** seasons: Padova (1996), Ascoli (2007), **Como** (2027)
- **15** seasons: **Venezia** (2027)
- **13** seasons: Alessandria (1960), Modena (2004), Perugia (2004), Novara (2012), Cesena (2015), **Sassuolo** (2027)
- **12** seasons: Pro Patria (1956)
- **11** seasons: Foggia (1995)
- **10** seasons: Avellino (1988)
- **9** seasons: Reggina (2009), Siena (2013), Cremonese (2026)
- **8** seasons: Sampierdarenese (1943), Lucchese (1952), Piacenza (2003), Pisa (2026)
- **7** seasons: Mantova (1972), Varese (1975), Catanzaro (1983), Pescara (2017)
- **6** seasons: Pro Vercelli (1935)
- **5** seasons: Messina (2007), Salernitana (2024)
- **4** seasons: Casale (1934), **Frosinone** (2027), **Monza** (2027)
- **3** seasons: Legnano (1954), Lecco (1967), Reggiana (1997), Crotone (2021), Spezia (2023)
- **2** seasons: Ternana (1975), Ancona (2004), Benevento (2021)
- **1** season: Pistoiese (1981), Treviso (2006), Carpi (2016)

== Logos ==
Serie A had logos that featured its sponsor Telecom Italia Mobile (TIM). The logo that was introduced in 2010 had a minor change in 2016 due to the change of the logo of TIM itself. In August 2018, a new logo was announced, and another one in August 2019.

On 5 February 2024, Serie A signed a new sponsor deal with Eni, otherwise known as Enilive, to take the main sponsor role of the Serie A.

== Television rights ==
In the past, individual clubs competing in the league had the rights to sell their broadcast rights to specific channels throughout Italy, unlike in most other European countries. Currently, the two broadcasters in Italy are the satellite broadcaster Sky Italia and streaming platform DAZN for its own pay television networks; RAI is allowed to broadcast only highlights (exclusively from 13:30 to 22:30 CET). This is a list of television rights in Italy (since 2021–22):

- Sky Italia (3 matches per week)
- DAZN (all matches, including the previous 3)
- OneFootball (highlights)

Since the 2010–11 season, Serie A clubs have negotiated television rights collectively rather than on an individual club basis, having previously abandoned collective negotiation at the end of the 1998–99 season.

=== International broadcasters ===
In the 1990s, Serie A was at its most popular in the United Kingdom when it was shown on Football Italia on Channel 4, although it has actually appeared on more UK channels than any other league, rarely staying in one place for long since 2002. Serie A has appeared in the UK on BSB's The Sports Channel (1990–91), Sky Sports (1991–1992), Channel 4 (1992–2002), Eurosport (2002–2004), Setanta Sports and Bravo (2004–2007), Channel 5 (2007–2008), ESPN (2009–2013), Eleven Sports Network (2018), Premier, FreeSports (2019–2021) and currently BT Sport (2013–2018; 2021–present).

In the United States, Serie A is currently shown on CBS Sports and its streaming network Paramount+. Prior to 2021–22 it was shown on the ESPN family of networks.

==== 2024–29 ====
For the 2024–29 cycle, the Serie A sold its international rights to the Infront agency (except in United States and MENA), which is in charge of reaching an agreement with the interested companies.

===== Africa =====
Country	Broadcasters
Sub-Saharan Africa	SuperSport, New World TV

===== Americas =====
Country	Broadcasters
Brazil	ESPN
Canada	fubo TV, TLN
Caribbean	ESPN
Latin America	ESPN
United States	CBS Sports; Telemundo Deportes

===== Asia and Oceania =====
Country	Broadcasters
Australia	beIN Sports
Brunei	beIN Sports
Bangladesh	Galaxy Racer
Cambodia	beIN Sports
Central Asia	Setanta Sports
China	CCTV, IQIYI, Migu
Hong Kong	I-CABLE HOY
Indian Subcontinent	TBA
Indonesia	beIN Sports, Vidio, ANTV
Japan	DAZN
Laos	beIN Sports
Macau	Macau Cable TV, M Plus
Malaysia	beIN Sports, Astro
Maldives	Ice Sports
New Zealand	beIN Sports
Philippines	beIN Sports, TAP DMV
Singapore	beIN Sports
South Korea	SPOTV
Taiwan	ELTA Sports
Tajikistan	TV Varzish, TV Football
Thailand	beIN Sports, TrueVisions
Uzbekistan	Sport
Vietnam	MyTV

===== Europe =====
Country	Broadcasters
Albania	SuperSport, Tring Sport
Andorra	DAZN
Armenia	Setanta Sports Eurasia, Fast Sports
Austria	DAZN
Azerbaijan	CBC Sport, Setanta Sports Eurasia
Belarus	Setanta Sports Eurasia, Sport TV
Belgium	DAZN, Play Sports
Bosnia and Herzegovina	Arena Sport
Bulgaria	Max Sport, Ring
Croatia	Arena Sport
Cyprus	CYTA
Czech Republic	Nova Sport, Premier Sport
Denmark	TV 2 Sport
Estonia	Setanta Sports Eurasia, Go3 Sport
Finland	MTV Urheilu
France	DAZN
Georgia	Setanta Sports Eurasia (Limited to 5 matches per week)
Germany	DAZN
Greece	Cosmote Sport
Hungary	Sport1
Iceland	Livey
Ireland	TNT Sports, DAZN
Kosovo	SuperSport, Artmotion
Latvia	Setanta Sports Eurasia, Go3 Sport
Liechtenstein	Blue Sport, Sky Sport
Lithuania	Setanta Sports Eurasia, Go3 Sport
Luxembourg	DAZN
Malta	Total Sports Network
Moldova	Setanta Sports Eurasia
Montenegro	Arena Sport
Netherlands	Ziggo Sport
North Macedonia	Arena Sport
Norway	VG+
Poland	Eleven Sports
Portugal	Sport TV
Romania	Digi Sport, Prima Sport
Russia	Match TV
San Marino	DAZN
Serbia	Arena Sport
Slovakia	Nova Sport, Premier Sport
Slovenia	Arena Sport
Spain	DAZN
Sweden	TV4
Switzerland	DAZN
Turkey	S Sport
Ukraine	MEGOGO
United Kingdom	TNT Sports, DAZN, BBC Sport, BBC Alba

===== Middle East and North Africa =====
Country	Broadcasters
MENA	StarzPlay
Israel	ONE

== Champions ==
The FIGC officially recognises 29 Italian Football Championships held prior to the 1929 reorganisation of the top division into Serie A. The most successful club in terms of national championships is Juventus, with a total of 36 titles. The second most successful club is Inter Milan, with 21 championships, followed by AC Milan, with 19 titles. In recognition of domestic success, the FIGC awards a star for every ten championships won, which may be displayed on a club's jersey.

No national titles were awarded for the 1926–27 and 2004–05 seasons. In both instances, the championships were revoked from Torino and Juventus respectively, due to their involvement in football-related scandals.

Club	Winners	Runners-up	Winning seasons
**Juventus**	36	21	1905, 1925–26, 1930–31, 1931–32, 1932–33, 1933–34, 1934–35, 1949–50, 1951–52, 1957–58, 1959–60, 1960–61, 1966–67, 1971–72, 1972–73, 1974–75, 1976–77, 1977–78, 1980–81, 1981–82, 1983–84, 1985–86, 1994–95, 1996–97, 1997–98, 2001–02, 2002–03, 2011–12, 2012–13, 2013–14, 2014–15, 2015–16, 2016–17, 2017–18, 2018–19, 2019–20
**Inter Milan**	21	17	1909–10, 1919–20, 1929–30, 1937–38, 1939–40, 1952–53, 1953–54, 1962–63, 1964–65, 1965–66, 1970–71, 1979–80, 1988–89, 2005–06, (Note: Title was put sub judice, then assigned to Inter Milan through the courts following the Calciopoli.) 2006–07, 2007–08, 2008–09, 2009–10, 2020–21, 2023–24, 2025–26
**AC Milan**	19	17	1901, 1906, 1907, 1950–51, 1954–55, 1956–57, 1958–59, 1961–62, 1967–68, 1978–79, 1987–88, 1991–92, 1992–93, 1993–94, 1995–96, 1998–99, 2003–04, 2010–11, 2021–22
**Genoa**	9	4	1898, 1899, 1900, 1902, 1903, 1904, 1914–15, 1922–23, 1923–24
**Torino**	7	8	1927–28, 1942–43, 1945–46, 1946–47, 1947–48, 1948–49, 1975–76
**Bologna**	7	4	1924–25, 1928–29, 1935–36, 1936–37, 1938–39, 1940–41, 1963–64
Pro Vercelli	7	1	1908, 1909, 1910–11, 1911–12, 1912–13, 1920–21, 1921–22 (CCI)
**Napoli**	4	8	1986–87, 1989–90, 2022–23, 2024–25
**Roma**	3	14	1941–42, 1982–83, 2000–01
**Lazio**	2	6	1973–74, 1999–2000
**Fiorentina**	2	5	1955–56, 1968–69
**Cagliari**	1	1	1969–70
Casale	1	0	1913–14
Novese	1	0	1921–22 (FIGC)
Hellas Verona	1	0	1984–85
Sampdoria	1	0	1990–91

Notes

- **Bold** denotes clubs competing in the 2026–27 Serie A season.
- In 2002, the FIGC awarded Spezia a special decoration for their victory in the 1944 wartime championship. However, the federation clarified that this recognition does not constitute an official scudetto.

=== By city ===
City	Championships	Clubs
Turin	43	Juventus (36), Torino (7)
Milan	40	Inter Milan (21), AC Milan (19)
Genoa	10	Genoa (9), Sampdoria (1)
Bologna	7	Bologna (7)
Vercelli	7	Pro Vercelli (7)
Rome	5	Roma (3), Lazio (2)
Naples	4	Napoli (4)
Florence	2	Fiorentina (2)
Cagliari	1	Cagliari (1)
Casale Monferrato	1	Casale (1)
Novi Ligure	1	Novese (1)
Verona	1	Hellas Verona (1)

=== By region ===
Region	Championships	Clubs
Piedmont	52	Juventus (36), Torino (7), Pro Vercelli (7), Casale (1), Novese (1)
Lombardy	40	Inter Milan (21), AC Milan (19)
Liguria	10	Genoa (9), Sampdoria (1)
Emilia-Romagna	7	Bologna (7)
Lazio	5	Roma (3), Lazio (2)
Campania	4	Napoli (4)
Tuscany	2	Fiorentina (2)
Sardinia	1	Cagliari (1)
Veneto	1	Hellas Verona (1)

== Records ==
Boldface indicates a player still active in Serie A. Italics indicates a player active outside Serie A.

=== Most appearances ===
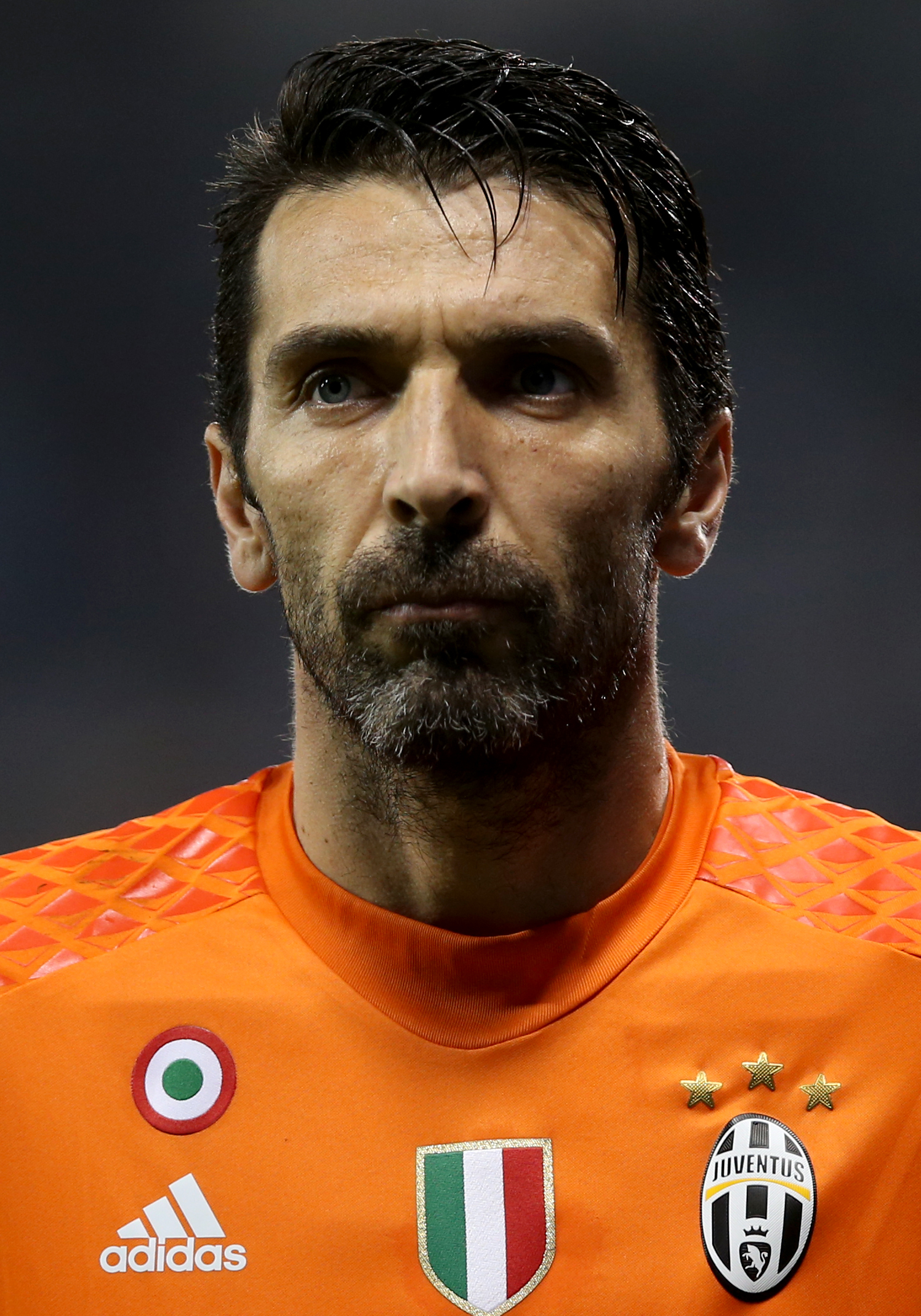
Gianluigi Buffon has made a record 657 appearances in Serie A

As of 4 June 2023

Rank	Player	Club(s)	Years active	Apps	Goals
1	(Italy) Gianluigi Buffon	Parma, Juventus	1995–2006; 2007–2018; 2019–2021	657	0
2	(Italy) Paolo Maldini	AC Milan	1984–2009	647	29
3	(Italy) Francesco Totti	Roma	1992–2017	619	250
4	(Argentina) Javier Zanetti	Inter Milan	1995–2014	615	12
5	(Italy) Gianluca Pagliuca	Sampdoria, Inter Milan, Bologna, Ascoli	1987–2005; 2006–2007	592	0
6	(Italy) Dino Zoff	Udinese, Mantova, Napoli, Juventus	1961–1983	570	0
7	(Slovenia) Samir Handanović	Treviso, Lazio, Udinese, Inter Milan	2004–2006; 2007–2023	566	0
8	(Italy) Pietro Vierchowod	Como, Fiorentina, Roma, Sampdoria, Juventus, AC Milan, Piacenza	1980–2000	562	38
9	(Italy) Fabio Quagliarella	Torino, Ascoli, Sampdoria, Udinese, Napoli, Juventus	1999–2000; 2001–2002; 2005–2023	556	182
10	(Italy) Roberto Mancini	Bologna, Sampdoria, Lazio	1981–2000	541	156

=== Most goals ===
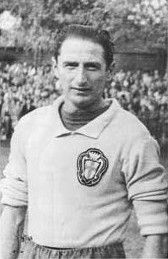
Silvio Piola is the highest goalscorer in Serie A history with 274 goals

As of 25 January 2026

Rank	Player	Club(s)	Years active	Goals	Apps	Ratio
1	(Italy) Silvio Piola	Pro Vercelli, Lazio, Juventus, Novara	1929–1943; 1946–1947; 1948–1954	274	537	0.51
2	(Italy) Francesco Totti	Roma	1992–2017	250	619	0.4
3	(Sweden) Gunnar Nordahl	AC Milan, Roma	1949–1958	225	291	0.77
4	(Italy) Giuseppe Meazza	Inter Milan, AC Milan, Juventus	1929–1943; 1946–1947	216	367	0.59
4	(Brazil) (Italy) José Altafini	AC Milan, Napoli, Juventus	1958–1976	216	459	0.47
6	(Italy) Antonio Di Natale	Empoli, Udinese	2002–2016	209	445	0.47
7	(Italy) Roberto Baggio	Fiorentina, Juventus, AC Milan, Bologna, Inter Milan, Brescia	1985–2004	205	452	0.45
8	(Italy) Ciro Immobile	Juventus, Genoa, Torino, Lazio, Bologna	2009–2010; 2012–2014; 2015–2024; 2025–2026	201	359	0.56
9	(Sweden) Kurt Hamrin	Juventus, Padova, Fiorentina, AC Milan, Napoli	1956–1971	190	400	0.48
10	(Italy) Giuseppe Signori	Foggia, Lazio, Sampdoria, Bologna	1991–2004	188	344	0.55
10	(Italy) Alessandro Del Piero	Juventus	1993–2006; 2007–2012	188	478	0.39
10	(Italy) Alberto Gilardino	Piacenza, Hellas Verona, Parma, AC Milan, Fiorentina, Genoa, Bologna, Palermo	1999–2017	188	514	0.37

== Players ==
=== Non-EU players ===
Unlike La Liga, for example, which has long imposed a quota on the number of players able to play for each club who hold passports from countries that are not in the European Union, Serie A has undergone many rule changes concerning the number of non-EU players clubs could sign.

During the 1980s and 1990s, most Serie A clubs signed a large number of players from foreign nations (both EU and non-EU members). Notable foreign players to play in Serie A during this era included Irish international Liam Brady, England internationals Paul Gascoigne and David Platt, France's Michel Platini and Laurent Blanc, Lothar Matthäus and Jürgen Klinsmann from Germany, Dutchmen Ruud Gullit and Dennis Bergkamp, and Argentina's Diego Maradona.

In the middle of the 2000–01 season, the old quota system, which limited each team to having no more than five non-EU players and using no more than three in each match, was abolished. Concurrent with the abolishment of the quota, the FIGC had investigated footballers that used fake passports. Alberto and Warley, Alejandro Da Silva and Jorginho Paulista of Udinese; Fábio Júnior and Gustavo Bartelt of Roma; Dida of Milan; Álvaro Recoba of Inter; Thomas Job, Francis Zé, Jean Ondoa of Sampdoria; and Jeda and Dede of Vicenza were all banned in July 2001 for lengths ranging from six months to one year. However, most of the bans were subsequently reduced.

At the start of the 2003–04 season, a quota was imposed on each of the clubs limiting the number of non-EU, non-EFTA and non-Swiss players who may be signed from abroad each season, following provisional measures introduced in the 2002–03 season, which allowed Serie A and B clubs to sign only one non-EU player in the 2002 summer transfer window.

The rule underwent minor changes in August 2004, June 2005, June 2006, and June 2007.

The number of non-EU players was reduced from 265 in 2002–03 season to 166 in 2006–07 season. This reduction also included players who received EU status after their respective countries joined the EU (see 2004 and 2007 enlargement), which made players such as Adrian Mutu, Valeri Bojinov, Marek Jankulovski and Marius Stankevičius EU players.

The quota system changed again at the beginning of the 2008–09 season: three quotas were awarded to clubs that do not have non-EU players in their squad (previously only newly promoted clubs could have three quotas); clubs that had one non-EU player had two quotas. Those clubs that had two non-EU players were awarded one quota and one conditional quota, which was awarded after: 1) Transferred 1 non-EU player abroad, or 2) Release 1 non-EU player as free agent, or 3) A non-EU player received EU nationality. Clubs with three or more non-EU players had two conditional quotas, but releasing two non-EU players as free agent only gave one quota instead of two. Serie B and Lega Pro clubs could not sign non-EU players from abroad, except those that followed a club promoted from Serie D.

On 2 July 2010, the above conditional quota was reduced back to one, though if a team did not have any non-EU players, that team could still sign up to three non-EU players. In 2011 the signing quota reverted to two.

Large clubs with many foreigners usually borrow quotas from other clubs that have few foreigners or no foreigners in order to sign more non-EU players. For example, Adrian Mutu joined Juventus via Livorno in 2005, as at the time Romania was not a member of the EU. Other examples include Júlio César, Victor Obinna and Maxwell, who joined Inter from Chievo (first two) and Empoli, respectively.

=== Homegrown players ===
Serie A also imposed Homegrown players rule, a modification of Homegrown Player Rule (UEFA). Unlike UEFA, Serie A at first did not cap the number of players in first team squad at 25, meaning the club could employ more foreigners by increasing the size of the squad. However, a cap of 25 (under-21 players were excluded) was introduced to 2015–16 season (in 2015–16 season, squad simply require 8 homegrown players but not require 4 of them from their own youth team). In the 2016–17 season, the FIGC sanctioned Sassuolo for fielding ineligible player, Antonino Ragusa. Although the club did not exceed the capacity of 21 players that were not from their own youth team (only Domenico Berardi was eligible as youth product of their own) as well as under 21 of age (born 1995 or after, of which four players were eligible) in their 24-men call-up, It was reported that on Lega Serie A side the squad list was not updated.

In 2015–16 season, the following quota was announced.

Size of first team squad	Local + club youth product
← 25	min. 8 (max. 4 not from own youth team)

=== FIFA World Players of the Year ===
- (Germany) Lothar Matthäus: 1991 (Inter Milan)
- (Netherlands) Marco van Basten: 1992 (AC Milan)
- (Italy) Roberto Baggio: 1993 (Juventus)
- (Liberia) George Weah: 1995 (AC Milan)
- (Brazil) Ronaldo: 1997, 2002 (Inter Milan) (Note: Ronaldo was signed by Inter Milan from Barcelona midway through 1997. He was signed by Real Madrid from Inter Milan midway through 2002.)
- (France) Zinedine Zidane: 1998, 2000 (Juventus)
- (Italy) Fabio Cannavaro: 2006 (Juventus) (Note: Cannavaro was signed by Real Madrid from Juventus midway through 2006.)
- (Brazil) Kaká: 2007 (AC Milan)

== Serie A Player of the Month ==
The Serie A Player of the Month recognises the best player each month in Serie A, which is usually done via online voting out of the five nominees.

As of 2026

Multiple winners
Rank	Player	Wins
1	(Argentina) Paulo Dybala	5
2	(Georgia (country)) Khvicha Kvaratskhelia	4
3	(Portugal) Rafael Leão	3
3	(Argentina) Lautaro Martínez	3
5	(Cameroon) Frank Anguissa	2
5	(Turkey) Hakan Çalhanoğlu	2
5	(Argentina) Alejandro Gómez	2
5	(Italy) Moise Kean	2
5	(Ukraine) Ruslan Malinovskyi	2
5	(Serbia) Sergej Milinković-Savić	2
5	(Nigeria) Victor Osimhen	2
5	(United States) Christian Pulisic	2
5	(Portugal) Cristiano Ronaldo	2
5	(France) Marcus Thuram	2
5	(Serbia) Dušan Vlahović	2

== See also ==
- Campionato Nazionale Primavera
- Coppa Campioni d'Italia
- Italian football clubs in international competitions
- List of foreign Serie A players
- List of owners of Italian football clubs
- Serie A Femminile
- Serie A Awards
- UEFA coefficient
