= Boo.com =

British eCommerce business

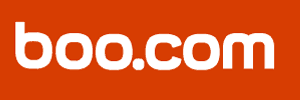
- Type: Dutch NV (Disestablished in 2000)
- Industry: retail
- Founded: 17 March 1999; 27 years ago
- Defunct: 2000
- Headquarters: London, England
- Key people: Ernst Malmsten; Kajsa Leander; Patrik Hedelin
- Products: clothing, cosmetics
- Website: Boo.com (Domain now owned by Hostelworld)

Boo.com was a short-lived British e-commerce business, founded in 1998 by Swedes Ernst Malmsten, Kajsa Leander and Patrik Hedelin, who were regarded as sophisticated Internet entrepreneurs in Europe by the investors because they had created an online bookstore named Bokus.com, the third largest book e-retailer (in 1997), before founding boo.com.

The company had its headquarters along Carnaby Street in London and initially had 40 employees. In October 1999, it had eight offices and 400 employees in Amsterdam, Munich, New York City, Paris, and Stockholm.

After several highly publicized delays, Boo.com launched in the autumn of 1999 selling branded fashion apparel on the Internet. The company spent $135 million of venture capital in just 18 months, and was placed into receivership on 18 May 2000 and liquidated.

It relaunched in the autumn of 2000 with Kate Buggeln, an ex-Bloomingdale's salesperson and Internet consultant, as president. She told Women's Wear Daily that they were working to "expand beyond the portal business model into Boo products and Boo licensing."

In June 2008, CNET hailed Boo.com as one of the greatest dot-com busts in history.

Malmsten wrote about the experience in his book Boo Hoo: A dot.com Story from Concept to Catastrophe, published in 2001.

== Marketing plan ==
=== Company vision ===
Boo.com was intended to become the largest online sports e-retailer in the world, planning to set up stores in both Europe and America simultaneously.

=== Brand name ===
The brand name was initially suggested as Bo.com, inspired by Bo Derek. The final domain name, Boo.com, was bought for $2500 from a dealer as the domain Bo.com was already in use.

=== Strategy ===
The target customers of Boo.com were young, wealthy, fashionable people between 18 and 24 years old, who were expected to be attracted by sports and fashion brands Boo.com offered. Boo.com created a virtual shopping assistant, Miss Boo, to assist customers with tips at each step. Boo.com also developed technology that allowed online customers to put their chosen products onto 3D models and inspect the result.

== Reasons for failure ==
=== Timing ===
Although there were several months of delays prior to launch and problems with the user experience when boo.com first launched, these had been largely fixed by the time the company entered receivership. Sales had grown rapidly and were around $500,000 for the fortnight prior to the site being shut down.

The fundamental problem was that the company was following an extremely aggressive growth plan, launching simultaneously in multiple European countries. This plan was founded on the assumption of the ready availability of venture capital money to see the company through the first few years of trading until sales caught up with operating expenses. Such capital ceased to be available for all practical purposes in the second quarter of 2000 following dramatic falls in the NASDAQ presaging the "dot crash" following the dot-com bubble. Boo was one of numerous similar dot-com company failures over the subsequent two years.

One Boo.com manager acknowledges that the company's failure was that global marketing and advertising costs too much, and that managers and technology invest too little. It spent $135 million of its investment in 2 years.

=== Problems with users experience ===
The Boo.com Homepage as it appeared in May 2000.

Boo.com's website was widely criticized as poorly designed for its target audience, going against many usability conventions. The site relied heavily on JavaScript and Flash technology to display pseudo-3D views of wares as well as Miss Boo, a sales-assistant-style avatar. The first publicly released version of the site included many large pages; the home page, for example, was several hundred kilobytes, which meant that many users had to wait minutes for it to load, as broadband technologies were not widely available at the time. The site's front page contained the warning, "this site is designed for 56K modems and above".

The complicated design required the site to be displayed in a fixed-size window, which limited the space available to display product information to the customer. Navigation techniques changed as the customer moved around the site.

The site's interface was complex and included a hierarchical system that required the user to answer four or five different questions before sometimes revealing that there were no products in stock in a particular subsection. The same basic questions then had to be answered again until results were found.

=== Excessive expenditure on marketing ===
Within 18 months, $135 million was spent on marketing by Boo.com. Boo.com spent $25 million on advertising and public relations marketing before it had even opened to sell products.

To attract consumers, the site developed a new Internet virtual technology with which consumers could drag their intended clothes onto a virtual 3D body model and then view it from any angles or distance. The investment in this technology cost Boo.com over $6 million to develop and $0.5 million every month to maintain.

== Burn rate ==
Boo.com spent £125 million in just six months. Its sales did not match expectations, due partly to a higher-than-expected rate of product returns (a service offered for free, but charged for by logistics supplier Deutsche Post). Poor management and lack of communication between departments resulted in rapid growth in costs. The effectiveness of an expensive ad campaign was limited since the website was not ready in time, resulting in curious visitors being greeted with a holding page.

Staff and contractors were recruited in large numbers, with a lack of direction and executive decision about how many people were required, resulting in high payroll costs.

== Aftermath ==
The biggest loser among boo.com's investors was Omnia, a fund backed by members of Lebanon's Hariri family, which put nearly £20 million into the company.

Creditors, most of whom were advertising agencies, were owed around £12 million. Over 400 staff and contractors were made redundant in London and around the world, and many had not been paid for several months.

In a widely circulated article, former Interim CTO Tristan Louis broke down the problems that plagued the company, in one of the first post-mortems of a technology company posted online.

Fashionmall.com, which had been operating since 1994, bought the remains of Boo.com, which included brand, web address and advertising materials but no physical assets, software or distribution channels. The deal also included the Miss Boo character. Boo's main assets, its software and technology, were sold to Bright Station, a British company run by Internet entrepreneur Dan Wagner, for $250,000 and served as the basis for Venda Inc. Wagner credited the technology he acquired as key to Venda's success (and its acquisition by NetSuite for $50 million in 2014).

Less than $2 million was earned by selling all Boo's remaining assets.

Of the original global boo.com staff only one worked for both boo.com incarnations. Bill Burley of the original boo.com staff in New York City is a retail executive in buying and merchandise planning. Burley was hired by fashionmall as the Global Fashion Director of the new boo. He reported directly to Buggeln.

In 2005 CNET called Boo.com the sixth greatest dot-com flop.

== Current state of the domain ==
In May 2007 Web Reservations International (WRI) turned boo.com into a travel site with reviews and listings. When the new site launched, it already had more than one million user reviews collected from existing WRI travel sites.

In October 2010, the new boo.com site announced that it was closing down effective 1 November 2010.

As of July 2020 boo.com redirects to hostelworld.com.
