= Alessandro Gadotti =

- Born: August 10, 1969 (age 57); Rome, Italy
- Education: Sapienza University of Rome
- Known for: Founder ZNAP Zwoop

Alessandro "Alex" Gadotti (born 10 August 1969 in Rome, Italy) is an entrepreneur who spent some years as APAC CEO of Powa Technologies. Powa, who had acquired ZNAP for US$75 million in May 2014 went into liquidation in February 2016.

Alessandro is known for its innovative approach to mobile payment. and for his long experience in mobility and IT innovation. He has also filed five international patents in the mobile payment field.

== Biography ==
Born in Rome, Italy and after a career in Ernst & Young where he became partner at 28, Alessandro Gadotti has been the director of one of the first Italian internet startups financed by the Fiat Group CiaoWeb. Soon after he becomes a partner in Value Partners (Management Consulting) where he became CEO for the South America system integrator startup of the group Value Team later acquired in 2011 by NTT Data.

Left Value Team in 2008 Alessandro became a serial entrepreneur in Hong Kong, where first started a flight simulator company called Flight Experience. and later on a leading aviation consulting company called Aviation Results that provides services to set up Flight Simulator training centers (TRTOs) for airlines.

Alessandro then started up MPayMe a company focused in the mobile payment space, launching the innovative product ZNAP. After raising more than 22M USD to fund the start-up, an unprecedented amount for any Hong Kong new tech startup, Alessandro sold the company to Powa Technologies in 2014 for US$75 million. Powa Technologies went bankrupt in February 2016.

In 2012, Alessandro suffered from Non-Hodgkin's Lymphoma cancer, for which he faced a year-long battle with chemotherapy in Hong Kong while full-time working for starting up MPayMe. Apparently, he is now cured with no relapses.

Alessandro has worked as chief executive for Asia Pacific in Powa Technologies that for some time has been one of the Internet Unicorn (finance) and the second most valued start-up in Europe before entering in administration in February 2016.

Alessandro has then started Zwoop a new venture in the innovation of the e-commerce space, based in Hong Kong.

== Other interests ==
Alessandro Gadotti published a novel in Italy under the title Il Piano di Allah (The Allah Plan).

Alessandro Gadotti is a fully licensed commercial pilot with more than 5,000 hours of flight.
