= Venda, Inc. =

- Type: Subsidiary of Oracle Corporation
- Industry: IT
- Founded: 2001
- Headquarters: New York City, New York, U.S.
- Key people: Dan Wagner, Chairman
- Products: software & services, IT platforms
- Website: www.venda.com

Venda, Inc. is a technology company that produces ecommerce software as a service.

Its eCommerce platform is multi-tenanted, PCI-DSS Tier One Compliant, and delivered via software as a service (SaaS). Venda's secure payment services are provided by Atos Origin and PayPal.

Venda was founded by eCommerce entrepreneur Dan Wagner and former Boo.com employee James Cronin using assets purchased from the bankrupt Boo.com, and launched its first site in 2001. Venda was privately held with individual, private equity and institutional ownership. The company's headquarters are located in New York City. Venda operates two additional offices in London, England and Bangkok, Thailand.

Venda won a Site of the Week Award from New Media Age for its Virgin Megastores site and ranked 41st on the "Tech Track 100" in September 2006.

Venda was acquired by NetSuite for $50.5 million in 2014.
