= Dida (footballer, born 1973) =

Brazilian footballer

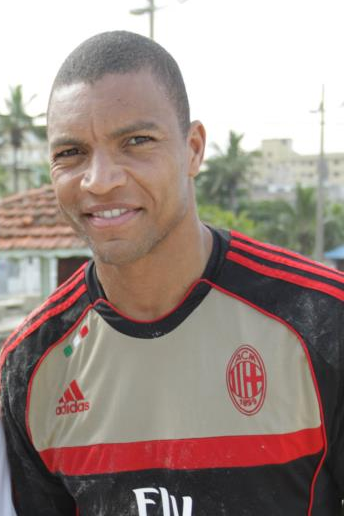
- Dida in 2010

Personal information
- Full name: Nélson de Jesus Silva
- Date of birth: 7 October 1973 (age 53)
- Place of birth: Irará, Bahia, Brazil
- Height: 1.96 m (6 ft 5 in)
- Position: Goalkeeper

Youth career
- 1990: Cruzeiro de Arapiraca
- 1991–1992: Vitória

Senior career*
Years	Team	Apps	(Gls)
1992–1993	Vitória	24	(0)
1994–1999	Cruzeiro	120	(0)
1998–1999	→ Lugano (loan)	0	(0)
1999–2000	Corinthians	24	(0)
2000–2010	AC Milan	206	(0)
2001–2002	→ Corinthians (loan)	8	(0)
2012	Portuguesa	32	(0)
2013	Grêmio	37	(0)
2014–2015	Internacional	27	(0)
Total		478	(0)

International career
1992–1993	Brazil U20	12	(0)
1996	Brazil Olympic	17	(0)
1995–2006	Brazil	91	(0)
Medal record
Men's football
Representing Brazil
FIFA World Cup
Winner	2002 Korea/Japan
Runner-up	1998 France
FIFA Confederations Cup
Winner	1997 Saudi Arabia
Winner	2005 Germany
Runner-up	1999 Mexico
Copa América
Winner	1999 Paraguay
Runner-up	1995 Uruguay
CONCACAF Gold Cup
Runner-up	1996 United States
Olympic Games
Bronze medal – third place	1996 Atlanta
FIFA U–20 World Cup
Winner	1993 Australia
South American U-20 Championship
Winner	1992 Colombia
- * Club domestic league appearances and goals

Nélson de Jesus Silva (Note: Full name has been incorrectly given as Nelson Jesus Dida or Nelson Jesus da Silva. He is regularly called Nelson Dida by European media.) (born 7 October 1973), better known simply as Dida (Brazilian Portuguese: [ˈdʒidɐ]), is a Brazilian former football goalkeeper and goalkeeping coach. He started his senior club career in Brazil in the early 1990s with Vitória before moving to Cruzeiro and Corinthians. He is perhaps best remembered for his ten-year stint with AC Milan from 2000 to 2010, where he established himself as one of the world's best goalkeepers and won multiple trophies and individual awards with the club, including one Serie A title (Scudetto) and twice the UEFA Champions League, with the first of those victories coming after he saved three penalties in the 2003 final against Serie A rivals Juventus, and is one of four Milan keepers with 300 career appearances. After a two-year absence from playing, he returned to Brazil in 2012, appearing for three teams—Portuguesa, Grêmio and Internacional—in as many seasons. He returned to Milan to serve as their goalkeeping coach from 2020 to 2022.

At international level, Dida earned 91 caps in eleven years with the Brazil national team, winning the FIFA World Cup and an Olympic medal, while he is the most successful player in the history of the FIFA Confederations Cup.

Considered one of the best goalkeepers of all time, Dida was the inaugural FIFPro Goalkeeper of the Year. He is additionally rated among the all-time greats in the position for Brazil alongside Alisson Becker, Marcos, Júlio César, Rogério Ceni, Cláudio Taffarel and Gilmar. (Note: Sources:) Dida has been credited with helping end the prejudice against black goalkeepers in Brazilian club football due to his success in Europe, and upon joining Internacional in 2014, became the first Afro-Brazilian keeper to play for the club in 43 years.

== Early life ==
Nélson de Jesus Silva was born on 7 October 1973 in the city of Irará in the northeastern Brazilian state of Bahia, and was raised in Lagoa da Canoa in the smaller neighbouring state of Alagoas, to where his family had moved when he was three months old. His first sport of choice was volleyball, until he discovered football by way of futsal and pickup games. He was given the nickname "Dida" at a young age, which he would later adopt as his playing name, and his preferred position was that of goalkeeper, despite its long-time unpopularity in Brazilian football and the country's history of discrimination against black players in the position.

A supporter of Rio de Janeiro-based club Flamengo, Dida helped form an amateur squad called Flamenguinho ("little Flamengo") at age thirteen, which marked his first experience in organised team play. His footballing idols were goalkeepers Rinat Dasayev and future Seleção teammate Cláudio Taffarel, who had enjoyed successful runs in Italy and Turkey and whom Dida later considered a pioneer in the growing acceptance of Brazilian keepers into European clubs.

== Club career ==
=== Vitória, Cruzeiro, and Corinthians ===
"[Bahian football] teams featured many homegrown talents. Vitória ... had players like Dida, Vampeta, Giuliano, Rodrigo, Paulo Isidoro, Alex Alves. A nineteen-year-old goalkeeper in Dida, defending a club like Vitória, though he was black. And whenever a black goalkeeper played [in Brazil], he was under suspicion."

— Former Vitória teammate João Marcelo, 2014

In 1990, at age 17, Dida made his club football debut with Alagoan team Cruzeiro de Arapiraca. Two years later, he joined the youth academy of hometown team and 1992 Campeonato Baiano winners Vitória. In 1993, after starting in Brazil's FIFA World Youth Championship victory, Dida made 24 starts in goal for Vitória's senior squad as they finished runner-up to Palmeiras in the Campeonato Brasileiro Série A, and he became the youngest recipient, at 20, of Brazilian football magazine Placar's annual Bola de Prata award as the Série A's best goalkeeper.

Dida was then acquired by Cruzeiro in 1994, and in a span of five seasons, he won four Campeonato Mineiro titles, the 1996 Copa do Brasil, the 1997 Copa Libertadores, and two more Bola de Prata goalkeeping awards. However, in January 1999, he publicly stated his desire to test his skills in Europe and catch the attention of the Brazil national team coaching staff in the process, and took the club to court in attempt to cancel the remainder of his contract so he could sign with AC Milan, the only European team that had extended him an offer. The ensuing legal battle between the player and Cruzeiro lasted for five months, and a FIFA ruling allowed Dida to be loaned to Swiss club Lugano in the meantime so he could keep in shape, though he never played a game. His move to Milan was finalised in May 1999 following a transfer fee of 2.7 billion Italian lire (R$5.2 million) paid to Cruzeiro.

Dida was the third goalkeeper on Milan coach Alberto Zaccheroni's depth chart behind Christian Abbiati and aging veteran Sebastiano Rossi for the 1999–2000 Serie A season, and he returned to Brazil as he was loaned to Corinthians to receive regular playing time. His reputation as a penalty stopper came into national renown during the 1999 Campeonato Brasileiro after he saved two separate spot kicks — both taken by Raí — in Corinthians' 3–2 victory over intrastate rival São Paulo in the semi-final, which earned him a 10 rating from Placar. Dida received his first nomination for the IFFHS World's Best Goalkeeper award that season, finishing eighth in the voting. He kept three clean sheets in four matches and conceded only two goals as Corinthians lifted the inaugural FIFA Club World Cup in 2000, and after the final against Vasco da Gama ended goalless after extra time, he blocked a Gilberto penalty in the ensuing shootout that Corinthians won 4–3 after Vasco striker Edmundo's shot went wide right. Corinthians midfielder Ricardinho revealed to the media afterward that the team was actively seeking to take the match to penalties during the extra period, knowing Dida would save "at least one in five"; indeed, BBC News castigated the "poor final" as both teams "never look[ing] like scoring in two hours of open play", while Dida himself criticised penalty shootouts in that they "cause[d] suffering to the players and the fans".

=== AC Milan ===
==== 1999–2002: Beginnings with Milan and return to Corinthians ====
Milan recalled Dida and named him their 2000–01 Champions League starter with first-choice Christian Abbiati on international duty with Italy at the 2000 Summer Olympics. His Rossoneri debut was a 4–1 group stage victory over Beşiktaş on 13 September 2000, but six days later, against Leeds United at a rain-soaked Elland Road, he accidentally dropped a late Lee Bowyer strike into his own goal, causing Milan to lose the match 1–0. His explanation was that he attempted to absorb the force of the shot and then catch hold of it, but the ball dropped into a puddle and bounced into the net. He started the remaining group stage games and kept his first clean sheet for Milan in a 2–0 win over Barcelona on 26 September, but was then replaced by Abbiati for the second group stage. Dida made his first Serie A start in a 2–0 November loss to Parma, his only league appearance of the year, and after Milan's 2–0 loss to Galatasaray—who featured his idol Taffarel in goal—on 7 March 2001, the Rossoneri were eliminated from the Champions League and Dida did not play again for the rest of the season.

Dida returned to Milan for the 2001–02 season, for which he was later suspended by the Italian Football Federation (FIGC) for his role in a false-passport scandal and therefore loaned back to Corinthians. He made only eight Série A appearances as the deputy to established first-choice Doni, but began a sustained high run of form in winning the Torneio Rio-São Paulo championship and 2002 Copa do Brasil with the Timão.

==== 2003–2004: Champions League and Scudetto success ====
"For me, he will always be the first companion I embraced after scoring the penalty against Buffon in that [2003] Champions League final."

— Andriy Shevchenko

Dida was recalled once again by Milan for 2002–03 as a reserve, making his season debut on 14 August 2002 as an injury substitute for Christian Abbiati in the second half of Milan's Champions League third-round qualifier against Slovan Liberec, in which his performance in the 1–0 victory and subsequent matches resulted in second-year coach Carlo Ancelotti promoting him to first choice. He made a then-career high 30 starts as Milan finished third in Serie A and exhibited the league's second-best defence that conceded only 30 goals (one behind champion Juventus' 29), while he won his lone Coppa Italia with the Rossoneri.

He made fourteen Champions League appearances, missing only the second leg of Milan's semi-final elimination of crosstown rival Internazionale to injury, as Milan advanced to face Juventus in the only all-Italian final in the competition's history. He was untested during the goalless regulation and extra-time periods save for his stop of a late Alessandro Del Piero shot, but saved from David Trezeguet, Marcelo Zalayeta and Paolo Montero in the penalty shootout that saw five of the first seven shots collectively stopped by Dida and Juventus' star goalkeeper Gianluigi Buffon. After Milan's Andriy Shevchenko scored the winner, he celebrated by leaping into Dida's arms as they were mobbed by teammates. Juventus coach Marcelo Lippi said after the match that "four or five" of his players had refused to take part in the shootout, while Bianconeri defender Lilian Thuram, who was not a participant, admitted to being affected beforehand by Dida's reputation as a penalty stopper. Dida ended the year by becoming the first Brazilian goalkeeper nominated for the Ballon d'Or, finishing 13th in voting.

Dida became the first non-Italian goalkeeper to win the Scudetto when Milan won its seventeenth title in the 2003–04 season, and he was runner-up to Buffon for the 2004 Serie A Goalkeeper of the Year award after conceding only 20 goals in 32 league appearances. Though Milan's Champions League repeat bid was ended by Deportivo de La Coruña in the quarter-finals, a highlight of their campaign was during a previous group-stage match against Ajax on 16 September 2003, when Dida blocked a point blank-range shot from Rafael van der Vaart at the end of extra time to preserve Milan's 1–0 win.

==== 2004–2005: Internazionale flare incident and Miracle of Istanbul ====
Milan started 2004–05 by winning the Supercoppa Italiana, and the first half of the Serie A season saw Dida nearly insurmountable in net. After he was sent off in the Rossoneri's season opener against Livorno, he conceded only ten goals as Milan went unbeaten in 17 of their next 18 league matches, among them a 1–0 win over Chievo on 28 November 2004 in which he had performed an acrobatic save on a Roberto Baronio free kick, changing direction after the ball was deflected mid-flight. Ancelotti later described the save to reporters as "[worth] no less than a goal". Though Dida kept 16 total clean sheets and conceded 25 goals in 36 (out of 38) appearances, Milan faltered by going winless in five of their final eight matches and finished runner-up to Scudetto winners Juventus.

In the Champions League, Dida allowed only three goals in Milan's first ten matches, including a string of five straight clean sheets following a 2–1 group-stage loss to Barcelona on 2 November 2004. The fifth of these came against crosstown rival Internazionale in the quarter-finals on 7 April 2005, in which Dida kept the Nerazzurri at bay with multiple saves, notably that of a top-corner Siniša Mihajlović free kick. With Milan leading 1–0 in the return leg on 12 April, Inter midfielder Esteban Cambiasso's second-half header was disallowed by referee Markus Merk due to a foul on Dida by forward Julio Cruz. Inter ultras located in the curva behind Dida's goal reacted to the call by hurling bottles and burning flares onto the pitch. As Dida attempted to resume gameplay by clearing out the debris from his penalty area to take a goal kick, a flare struck him on his right shoulder, missing his head by inches. The match was halted as firefighters worked to clear the pitch while Dida received treatment for bruising and first-degree burns to his shoulder. After a half-hour delay, the game resumed with Christian Abbiati in goal but was abandoned less than a minute later after more projectiles rained down. UEFA officially awarded Milan a 3–0 win, resulting in Dida tying a Champions League record, then shared with Edwin van der Sar and Józef Wandzik, with his sixth consecutive shutout. Inter were later fined €200,000 (£132,000) by UEFA and ordered to play their next four European matches behind closed doors. In the semi-finals against PSV, Dida set a competition record with his seventh consecutive clean sheet in Milan's 2–0 first-leg victory on 26 April, but his scoreless streak ended at 623 total minutes following a Park Ji-sung strike in the ninth minute of the second leg on 4 May as PSV won 3–1, but the Rossoneri advanced to the final on away goals.

Milan charged to an early 3–0 lead in the first half in the 2005 Champions League final in Istanbul against Premier League side Liverpool, who in turn rallied in the second half with three goals in a span of six minutes, the second being a strike from Reds midfielder Vladimír Šmicer that Dida got a hand to but was unable to keep out. The third came on a Xabi Alonso penalty saved by Dida before Alonso netted the rebound. With the match going to penalties after ending 3–3 in regulation and extra time, Dida stopped only from John Arne Riise as Liverpool won the shootout 3–2. He later faced press criticism for what was deemed a poor reaction to Šmicer's shot on goal. Dida was among five Milan players named to the inaugural FIFPro World XI at the end of the season, while he finished a career-best second for the 2005 IFFHS World's Best Goalkeeper award, behind winner Petr Čech. He also made a nomination for Serie A Goalkeeper of the Year for a 2nd time but once again lost to Gianluigi Buffon. He was additionally shortlisted for the 2005 Ballon D'Or, but did not receive any votes.

==== 2005–2006: Decline in form ====
In 2005–06, Milan went trophyless in both domestic and European competitions for the first time since 2001–02. They finished second and three points behind Juventus in Serie A, before being implicated in the Calciopoli match-fixing scandal. The Rossoneri lost as many matches (five) in the first half of the season as they had the entire previous year while conceding 22 goals in that 19-game span, with Dida not keeping a clean sheet until the fourth matchday, a 2–0 win over Lazio. His form had also begun to visibly decline as he committed noticeable errors such as dropping a cross in Milan's 4–3 win over Parma on 8 January 2006 that allowed Paolo Cannavaro to score the loose ball and give Parma an early 1–0 lead; and attempting an underhand catch of an Andrea Gasbarroni shot that instead bounced off his arm and into goal, resulting in a 1–1 draw with Sampdoria on 28 January that put Milan nine points behind Juventus in the title race. In February 2006, Brazil national team coach Carlos Alberto Parreira, who had previously coached Dida at Corinthians, publicly declared that Dida risked jeopardising his starting position for the upcoming World Cup if his form did not improve. Milan were eliminated by Barcelona in the 2006 Champions League semi-final on a 1–0 aggregate, but Dida was praised for saves against Samuel Eto'o, Ronaldinho and Henrik Larsson over both legs. However, his Champions League clean-sheet record of seven from the previous season was surpassed by Arsenal's Jens Lehmann, who finished the year with ten straight.

==== 2006–2007: Return to Champions League victory ====
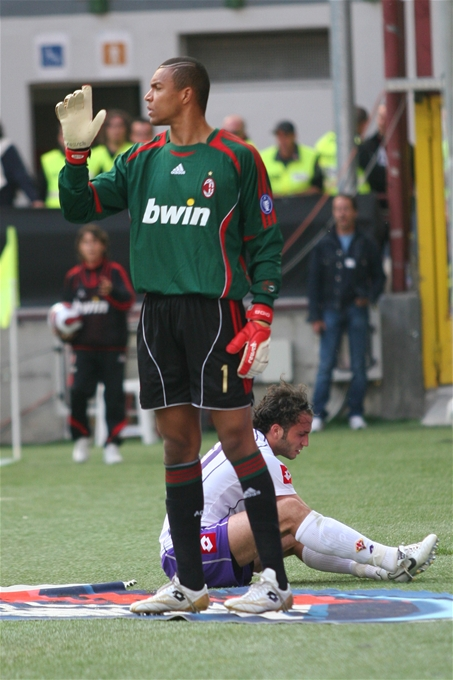
Dida and Giampaolo Pazzini in Milan's goalless home draw against Fiorentina on 6 May 2007

As punishment for their involvement in the Calciopoli scandal, Milan began the 2006–07 Serie A season with an eight-point deficit in the standings, and finished fourth behind Internazionale, Roma and Lazio. Following a strike by Lazio's Stephen Makinwa in Milan's 2–1 season opener on 10 September 2006, Dida did not allow a league goal for the next 446 minutes. He played his 200th match for Milan in a 1–0 win over Ascoli on 20 September. However, 2006–07 was also the first injury-plagued season of his career, beginning with knee ligament damage suffered in Milan's 1–0 loss to AEK Athens on 21 November 2006 that side-lined him for the rest of the year. Reserve keeper Zeljko Kalac deputized until Dida returned on 21 January 2007 in a goalless draw with Lazio. He missed 13 total Serie A matches due to recurring knee and shoulder problems, after having missed ten games in the last three seasons combined.

Milan additionally had to qualify for the 2006–07 Champions League, accomplished by defeating Red Star Belgrade on aggregate, and the Rossoneri then proceeded to top their group as Dida kept four clean sheets and conceded only twice in that six-match span. In the quarter-finals against Bayern Munich, he was criticized for conceding a stoppage-time equalizer from Daniel Van Buyten in the first leg on 3 April that relegated Milan to a 2–2 home draw. Dida then kept a clean sheet in the second leg as Milan shut out Bayern 2–0 and advanced to the semi-finals against Manchester United, but he again received criticism for errors resulting in goals (from Cristiano Ronaldo and Wayne Rooney) in a 3–2 defeat. After the loss, a Milan fan mockingly put Dida up for sale on auction site eBay before the site removed the listing. Dida kept another second-leg clean sheet in Milan's decisive 3–0 home win on 3 May, in addition to becoming the first goalkeeper to register an assist in the Champions League, as the Rossoneri advanced to the 2007 final for a rematch against Liverpool. Dida saved from Jermaine Pennant, Steven Gerrard and Peter Crouch as Milan won 2–1 and he raised his second Champions League trophy, and the Rossoneri's seventh overall, in five seasons.

==== 2007–08: Injury problems, Celtic fan incident and benching ====
Dida won his second career UEFA Super Cup after Milan defeated Sevilla on 31 August 2007, and his second FIFA Club World Cup with Milan's 4–2 win over Boca Juniors on 16 December. He had additionally set a record with his sixth match played in the competition, a mark that was broken after several Al Ahly players collectively earned their seventh caps the next year. However, Dida endured his worst season with the club, as ongoing poor form and injuries spelled the end of his tenure as Milan's number one after six seasons, as the Rossoneri finished fifth in Serie A and consequently missed out on Champions League qualification for the following season.

On 3 October 2007, during Milan's Champions League group stage match against Celtic in Glasgow, Celtic striker Scott McDonald scored the match-winner in the 90th minute to seal a 2–1 victory. As the Celtic players celebrated, 27-year-old Celtic fan Robert McHendry entered the pitch and tapped Dida on the shoulder while running through Milan's penalty area. Dida initially gave chase but after a few steps collapsed to the ground while holding the side of his face, and he was stretchered off and substituted. McHendry later turned himself in to police and was given a lifetime ban from Celtic Park, but UEFA charged Dida with breaching rules upholding "loyalty, integrity and sportsmanship", as it was deemed that he had feigned injury. He was punished with a two-match suspension, while Celtic were fined £25,000 for the pitch invasion. Milan appealed the ruling, feeling the sentence "turn[ed] Dida into the protagonist of the incident". Dida never spoke publicly about the incident, but in Milan's first home game following the Celtic match — a 1–0 loss to Empoli on 21 October — he offered a gesture of apology to the fans in attendance by pausing during warmups to bow to each section of the crowd, receiving a round of applause in response. His ban was reduced to one match, causing him to miss Milan's 4–1 first-leg victory over Shakhtar Donetsk on 24 October, but he returned for the 3–0 second leg victory on 6 November. The death knell of Dida's campaign came in Milan's 2–1 derby loss to Inter on 23 December, when he inexplicably dived in the opposite direction of Esteban Cambiasso's game-winning goal, for which he was lambasted by fans and the press. He started Milan's 5–2 win over Napoli on 13 January 2008, but a knee injury the following week saw him replaced by backup Zeljko Kalac, whose own strong form kept him first choice for the remainder of the season, including the Champions League until Milan were eliminated in the knockout round by Arsenal.

==== 2008–2010: Revival, rivalry and departure ====
Dida was among a clog of goalkeepers in the Milan squad at the start of the 2008–09 season that included Kalac, Christian Abbiati, and 2007 signing Marco Storari. He was named second choice behind Abbiati after Kalac was demoted to third choice upon conceding five goals in Milan's Russian Railways Cup loss to Chelsea on 3 August and Storari was loaned to Fiorentina. Dida was designated to Milan's UEFA Cup campaign, in which he kept only one clean sheet in six matches as the Rossoneri were eliminated by eventual finalists Werder Bremen. On 15 March 2009, Dida played his first Serie A match in over a year after Abbiati suffered a season-ending knee injury during Milan's 5–1 win at Siena. He finished the season as starter, keeping six clean sheets in a career-low ten league appearances as Milan placed third behind Inter and Juventus and returned to the Champions League.

In 2009–10, with Carlo Ancelotti replaced by Leonardo as head coach after nine seasons, Milan finished third behind Internazionale and Juventus in Serie A for the second straight year, and were eliminated by Manchester United on a 7–2 aggregate in the Champions League round of 16. Dida was unable to compete for the starting spot after missing the preseason with injury, and served as Storari's backup until making his season debut as an injury substitute for the third time in his Milan career, in a 2–1 defeat of Roma on 18 October 2009. On 21 October, in his first Champions League appearance of the season against Real Madrid during the group stage, Dida caught an Esteban Granero header in the 18th minute and hurried to move the ball upfield without having complete control of it, causing him to bounce it off his knee and Raúl to slot the loose ball into an empty net. His mistake did not prove costly as Madrid goalkeeper Iker Casillas erred on two goals that enabled Milan to gain their first victory (3–2) at the Santiago Bernabéu Stadium.

"Today is the first day I'm living as a former Rossonero after ten years. I wanted to ... say goodbye to all the Milan fans who in these years were close to me and with whom I have shared joys and bitterness, despite winning everything. A big thank you to Silvio Berlusconi, Adriano Galliani and Sporting Director Ariedo Braida: without them I could never have had such a gratifying experience both from a sporting and human point of view. There are many people I'd like to thank: all the teammates I've had, Milan's managers and co-workers, the Milanello staff. But I especially want to cite Carlo Ancelotti, the coach who allowed me to play in this fantastic team and with whom I spent the biggest part of my Rossoneri life, and Villiam Vecchi, who endured me for all these years. ... Thanks from the heart and Forza Milan!"

— Dida in his goodbye letter to Milan, 1 July 2010

Dida retained the starting spot on the back of strong league performances despite Storari returning to fitness, such as a stoppage-time save from Pablo Granoche in a 25 October 2–1 win over Chievo, and double and triple saves performed minutes apart in a 2–2 draw at Napoli on 28 October. Dida kept four clean sheets and conceded an average of one goal per game as Milan enjoyed an eight-match unbeaten league run in that stretch that ended in a 2–0 loss to Palermo on 13 December. With Dida retaining the number-one jersey into 2010 and Abbiati returning from injury, Storari was loaned to Sampdoria on 15 January. However, after Abbiati returned for his first match in ten months on 31 January, a 1–1 draw with Livorno that Dida missed due to a back injury, both keepers were subsequently juggled in and out of the starting lineup due to Leonardo's difficulty in establishing a definite number one, until Abbiati's heroics in Milan's 2–0 win over Bari on 21 February relegated Dida to the bench. After Abbiati was side-lined with tendinitis on 28 March, Dida started for the rest of the season, finishing with his most Serie A appearances (23) in four years. On 1 May, he played his 300th match in all competitions for Milan in a 1–0 win over Fiorentina, and was substituted for Abbiati in the 88th minute of the Rossoneri's 3–0 season-finale defeat of Juventus on 15 May, receiving a standing ovation as he departed. His final game for Milan was a postseason friendly against Major League Soccer (MLS) team Chicago Fire.

Dida's contract expired on 30 June 2010, ending his decade-long tenure with the club. He made 302 total appearances in goal for Milan, the third-highest number behind Christian Abbiati (380) and Sebastiano Rossi (330). He finished with the currently sixth-highest number of Champions League clean sheets (35) and the second-highest percentage of clean sheets in games played (49%, behind Edwin Van der Sar's 52%), in addition to the fourth-highest unbeaten mark (623 minutes) in Champions League history.

Dida participated in team-related events after his departure. He joined Milan Glorie (a selection of team alumni) for charity friendlies against other veterans from clubs such as HJK Helsinki and Vélez Sársfield, in which he was often deployed in attack instead of goal. In May 2012, he represented Milan in the 2012 Mundialito de Clubes beach soccer tournament, in which the Rossoneri were eliminated in the group stage after going winless in three games.

=== Return to Brazil ===
==== Portuguesa (2012) ====
After two years of being unable to secure a contract and continue playing in Europe, Dida returned to Brazil to resume his career. On 24 May 2012, Portuguesa signed him for the remainder of the Brasileiro season as a replacement for departing goalkeeper Weverton. He made his debut on 26 June in a 1–0 win over São Paulo, and on 1 July, helped in holding Santos to a goalless draw in a match that was billed as a duel of generations between Dida and Santos' young star Neymar, who was eighteen years his junior. Dida made 32 starts and conceded 31 goals as Portuguesa avoided relegation from the Campeonato Brasileiro top flight, but he departed after the season when his contract expired.

==== Grêmio (2013) ====
On 19 December 2012, Dida joined Porto Alegre-based Grêmio on a deal for an undisclosed duration that was finalized after he accepted a reduction of his original wage request. He was signed at the behest of coach Vanderlei Luxemburgo, who sought an experienced backup to incumbent Marcelo Grohe. By January 2013, Dida had surpassed the 26-year-old Grohe as first choice, allowing 34 goals in 37 league starts as Grêmio finished runner-up to Cruzeiro, while advancing to the semi-final of the Copa do Brasil by eliminating Corinthians in a penalty shootout that saw Dida stop three spot kicks, notably former Milan teammate Alexandre Pato's botched panenka attempt. Grêmio were unable to advance past the round of 16 in the Copa Libertadores after losing on away goals to Independiente Santa Fe, which led to Luxemburgo's firing on 30 June.

==== Internacional (2013–2015) ====
After Grêmio turned down his extension request at the end of the season, Dida signed a two-year deal with archrival Internacional on 26 December 2013. He downplayed the rivalry between the clubs, citing that he had wanted to remain in Porto Alegre for family reasons. Due to injury, Dida did not make his debut until 23 February 2014 in a 1–0 loss to Veranópolis, but was able to supplant brothers Alisson Becker and Muriel for the starting spot, making 27 total first-team appearances as Internacional would finish third in Série A and win the 2014 Campeonato Gaúcho.

Following a poor performance in a 2–0 loss to his former club Vitória on 10 September, Dida was benched in favour of Muriel for Internacional's 2–0 win over Botafogo four days later but entered as an injury substitute in the second half. He made six consecutive starts while Muriel recovered from a thigh injury, but lost the job permanently after Internacional were blown out 5–0 by Chapecoense on 5 October, during which he was sent off for a late challenge. Becker was established as the Colorado's number one thereafter, with Dida demoted to third choice. His final appearance was a 2–0 win over Passo Fundo on 5 April 2015 in the first round of the 2015 Campeonato Gaúcho, during which he became the oldest player, at 41 years and six months, to ever take the pitch for Internacional. On 25 August, an online video of Dida performing a series of acrobatic practice saves during a team training session went viral. In 2016, he unsuccessfully sought a new club with whom to continue playing until the end of the calendar year, and retired thereafter.

== Coaching career ==
After his contract with Internacional expired in 2015, Dida temporarily remained with the club in an internship role as he studied to earn his coaching badges, and took Brazilian Football Confederation-required courses in December 2015 alongside former Brazil teammates Taffarel and Ricardinho. He served as an assistant and consultant to China League One club Shenzhen under the invitation of former Milan teammate and then-head coach Clarence Seedorf from October to November 2016. In August 2018, Dida joined the technical staff of Egyptian Premier League side Pyramids FC to provide additional goalkeeper training, and returned to Milan a year later as goalkeeping coach of the team's youth sector. He was promoted in August 2020 to goalkeeping coach of the senior squad for the 2020–21 season. and departed the position after Milan's Scudetto-winning 2021–22 season.

== International career ==
=== 1993–1996: Youth career, first cap, and Olympics disappointment ===
Dida is the first major Brazilian goalkeeper to be known by a nickname, as opposed to the tradition of going by either his first or last name. He first represented the Seleção at the under-20 level as first choice at the 1993 FIFA World Youth Championship, keeping four clean sheets in six matches and conceding only two goals as Brazil were victorious. After Taffarel was suspended for the first two games of the 1995 Copa América due to a uniform violation, Dida earned his first cap for the senior side at age 21 in a 1–0 defeat of Ecuador, and started in Brazil's 2–0 win over Peru.

He was called up by coach Mário Zagallo as the backup to Danrlei for the 1996 CONCACAF Gold Cup, in which Brazil sent their under-23 squad, and he never left the bench as the Seleção finished runners-up to Mexico. Dida was named the starter for the 1996 Summer Olympics, but Brazil endured a disappointing campaign and finished with a bronze medal, while he gained notoriety for colliding with teammate Aldair in a 1–0 loss to Japan as they chased a long ball into the penalty area, giving Japan the empty-net goal.

=== 1997–2001: First World Cup, and Copa América success ===
"He will dominate the [goalkeeping] position for many years. I pray for God to protect him."

— Former Brazil goalkeeper Moacir Barbosa on Dida before the 1999 Copa América final.

Dida was excluded from Brazil's 1997 Copa América roster, but returned to the starting lineup for the inaugural FIFA Confederations Cup that year, keeping five clean sheets and allowing just two total goals as the Seleção lifted the trophy with a 6–0 rout of Australia in the final. Though he was called up for the 1998 World Cup, Taffarel remained first choice, and Dida was third behind backup Carlos Germano as Brazil finished runners-up to the hosts. He would not play for the national team in all of 1998, which factored into his decision to leave club team Cruzeiro for Milan at the start of the next year. In 1999, under new coach Vanderlei Luxemburgo, Dida won his lone Copa América with Brazil after a 3–0 defeat of Uruguay in the final. He conceded only two total goals in the competition, and blocked a game-tying Roberto Ayala penalty in a 2–1 victory over arch-rival Argentina in the quarter-finals. He made his second straight Confederations Cup start that year as Brazil allowed no goals in the group stage and thrashed hosts Saudi Arabia 8–2 in the semi-finals, but were again thwarted by champions Mexico, losing 4–3 in the final.

Dida made his third consecutive Confederations Cup start in 2001, keeping clean sheets in every group stage match for the second consecutive time as Brazil finished second behind Japan with one win and two draws, but lost to eventual winners France 2–1 in the semi-finals and then 1–0 to Australia in the third-place match.

=== 2002–2005: World Cup triumph and Confederations Cup record ===
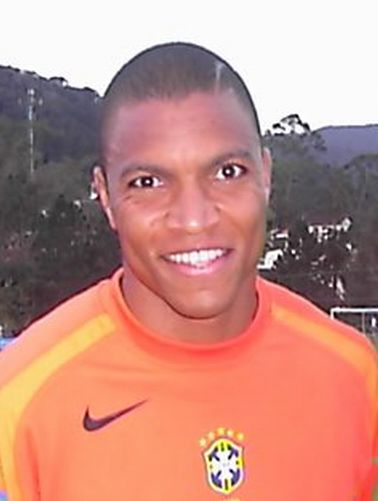
Dida (seen here in 2005) earned 91 caps with Brazil from 1995 to 2006 and was part of three World Cup squads.

With his success at Corinthians gaining the attention of coach Luiz Felipe Scolari, Dida was called up for the 2002 World Cup as the backup to Marcos, whom Scolari had previously coached at Palmeiras, and he and third choice Rogério Ceni never left the bench as the Seleção won its fifth title. On the afternoon of the final, Dida was requested by Ronaldo to keep him company in attempt to avoid a repeat of the events prior to the 1998 final, when Ronaldo had suffered a convulsive fit in his sleep that factored into his poor performance in Brazil's 3–0 loss to France. They spent the time talking and playing golf before departing for International Stadium in Yokohama. Ronaldo scored both goals in Brazil's 2–0 defeat of Germany and won the tournament's Golden Shoe award.

Dida started his fourth Confederations Cup in 2003, where Brazil suffered its worst-ever finish with elimination in the group stage. He returned for his fifth and last Confederations Cup start in 2005, and in Brazil's 1–0 group stage loss to Mexico, he saved a penalty from Jared Borgetti that had to be retaken twice due to repeated player encroachment into the penalty area, after Borgetti scored on the first attempt but hit the crossbar on the second. Dida was rested by coach Carlos Alberto Parreira for a 2–2 draw with Japan on 22 June as Marcos earned his final cap for Brazil. In a 3–2 semi-final victory over hosts Germany, he faced his second penalty of the competition, which Michael Ballack converted despite Dida guessing the right direction. He became the first two-time Confederations Cup winner after the Seleção's decisive 4–1 victory over Argentina in the final, earning him the last trophy of his international career.

=== 2006 World Cup and international retirement ===
After 86 caps earned and two World Cups as a reserve, Dida started the 2006 World Cup finals in Germany, making him the second-oldest World Cup goalkeeper for Brazil, at 32 years and eight months, behind Gilmar (35 years in 1966). He was part of Brazil's unheralded defensive unit, with Lúcio and Juan, that conceded only one goal in wins over Croatia, Australia and Japan in the group stage. In a 3-0 round-of-sixteen victory over Ghana, Dida performed a point-blank save from John Mensah with his leg, and was 1970 World Cup winner Tostão's personal choice for man of the match. However, Brazil struggled offensively throughout and were eliminated after a 1–0 loss to France in the quarterfinals, with Dida and the defence among the few players avoiding media criticism for the team's disappointing performance. He became the first keeper to wear the captain's armband for Brazil, since Émerson Leão in 1978, when Cafu was rested in the 4–1 win over Japan on 22 June.

Dida did not play for Brazil again following the July 2006 hiring of new coach Dunga, and retired from the national team on 1 October. He finished with 91 total caps, third all-time among Brazilian keepers behind Taffarel (101) and Gilmar (94), and allowed 70 goals. Dida is the most successful player in the history of the Confederations Cup, ranking first in appearances (22) and total clean sheets (12), while being the only player to have participated in five editions of the competition. He faced a total of eight penalties in his international career, saving six of them.

== Style of play and reception ==
While Dida is regarded by several pundits as one of the best goalkeepers of his generation, and one of the Brazilian national team's greatest keepers, he received a divided response to his playing style, particularly during his time with Milan, where he was noted for excelling as a Brazilian goalkeeper in a country (Italy) renowned for producing quality keepers. At Milan he trained extensively with goalkeeping coach Villiam Vecchi, who had previously tutored Gianluigi Buffon at Parma. Vecchi described Dida as "more reflective" in his gameplay, whereas Buffon acted mainly on instinct. In his prime, Dida was recognised for his shot-stopping ability and command of the area, and for possessing athleticism and reflexes that belied his imposing size, which enabled him to perform acrobatic "miracle" saves without resorting to histrionics, while former coaches have praised him for keeping his emotions in check after conceding a goal. Dida's best-known attribute is his expertise in saving penalties, which is acknowledged mainly in Brazil due to his accomplishments with Cruzeiro and Corinthians. He is additionally recognised for his reserved disposition both on and off the pitch and his reluctance in granting interviews, as well as his physical conditioning and work ethic.

Dida, however, also faced criticism for lapses in concentration that sometimes resulted in mistakes or goals, with the Leeds goal from 2000 remaining his most prominent example. He has been scrutinized for suspect footwork, hesitance in coming off his goal-line, and fielding crosses. He was considered one of the world's best goalkeepers at the height of his success with Milan from 2003 to 2005, including a perceived rivalry with Buffon as the best overall in world football, but the April 2005 Internazionale flare incident is cited as the catalyst behind the end of his high run of form. In 2006, The Guardian labelled Dida "Brazil's answer to David James", who himself had gained infamy for goalkeeping errors while playing for Liverpool in the 1990s. He additionally came under fire from former Milan goalkeepers for his drops in performance; Fabio Cudicini opined in 2007 that Dida's mistakes were due to psychological factors, while Enrico Albertosi was more blunt, saying in 2009 that Dida was "never a guarantee" in goal, "even when he was at his best".

=== Nicknames ===
Dida earned many nicknames in his club career, first at Cruzeiro with A muralha azul ("blue wall"), followed by São Dida ("Saint Dida") and O rei dos pênaltis ("King of Penalties") at Corinthians. Milan Channel presenter Carlo Pellegatti nicknamed him Baghera la pantera (a reference to The Jungle Book character Bagheera) for his acrobatic saves. Dida was called L’Ammiraglio ("The Admiral") by Milan supporters as a play on his first name in reference to Horatio Nelson, but conversely labeled Didastro — a play on disastro, Italian for "disaster" — after poor performances. Placar labeled him a geladeira ("refrigerator") and homem de gelo ("the iceman") for his emotionless in-match personality.

== Influence ==
"In his own quiet way Dida has done a great deal to counter the prejudice that may linger on in the generation of Chico Anysio."

— Football journalist Tim Vickery in 2007. Anysio, a Brazilian actor and comedian, had disparaged black goalkeepers in a June 2006 article published in Lance!. The article was reprinted on 31 October 2007, the same day as a match between Flamengo and Corinthians, who respectively started black keepers in Bruno and Felipe.

Dida is the first notable Afro-Brazilian goalkeeper to play for club and country since Moacir Barbosa, who had starred for Vasco da Gama and earned seventeen caps for Brazil, but bore the blame for Uruguay's winning goal in the 1950 World Cup final, which resulted thereafter in discrimination against black goalkeepers in Brazilian football. Dida was hailed by Brazilian media outlets for breaking this barrier after making his 1995 national team debut, starting in the 1999 Copa América, and particularly in 2006, when he became the first black keeper in 56 years to start in a World Cup for Brazil. On 27 May 2006, during a press conference in Weggis, Switzerland, where the Seleção were holding public training sessions, Dida called for his countrymen to forgive Barbosa, and to instead remember his positive contributions to Brazilian football. On 11 June, two days before the Seleção's opening match against Croatia, Folha de S.Paulo commented, "Black, Northeastern, and in his thirties, Dida will break barriers for a Brazilian goalkeeper." Though such accolades continued for Dida after the tournament and his international retirement, he and Barbosa remain the only Afro-Brazilian keepers to start a World Cup finals match.

On the club level, Dida's success with Milan is cited as a factor in the increased presence of black goalkeepers on Brazilian teams, and, along with Taffarel, influential in the increase of Brazilian keepers in Europe. Zero Hora wrote that Dida had become the first black keeper since 1971 to play for Internacional upon his signing with the club in January 2014. Some goalkeepers have adopted his playing name as an homage, or due to perceived physical resemblances.

== Legal issues ==
During the 2000–01 Serie A season, Dida was among multiple players, including Juan Sebastián Verón, Álvaro Recoba, and then-future Milan teammate Cafu, who were implicated in a league scandal involving fraudulent European passports. Dida had joined Milan with a Portuguese passport in order to gain EU status, as Milan had already met their limit on non-EU players at the time with Andriy Shevchenko, Serginho, and Croatian midfielder Zvonimir Boban. However, following a routine check that revealed the document was illegal, Milan promptly re-registered him as a non-EU player. In June 2001, the Italian Football Federation fined the club £314,000 and banned Dida from the league for one year, while FIFA imposed a yearlong ban from international play. Milan loaned him back to Corinthians for the 2001–02 season in accordance with the league suspension. On 3 April 2003, following a court appearance in Milan, Dida was handed a seven-month suspended prison sentence.

== Media ==
In 1996, after the Summer Olympics, Dida and Brazil coach Mário Zagallo filmed a Volkswagen Gol television commercial in which Zagallo implores "sai do Gol" ("out of the Gol", a pun on "out of the goal"), while Dida, who is seated inside the vehicle, has no dialogue. Italian jewelry manufacturer FIBO Steel featured Dida and Buffon in a 2005 advertising campaign for their "FA1RPLAY" metal jewelry collection, and he modeled several items in their online catalog. A longtime wearer of goalkeeping gloves from German sportswear manufacturer Reusch, Dida appeared on the cover of their summer 2006 catalog. He has otherwise featured in few endorsement opportunities in his career; he explained to Placar in 2001 that he was uninterested in commercializing his image. He does not participate in social media.

Dida joined Milan teammates Paolo Maldini, Andriy Shevchenko, Gennaro Gattuso, Massimo Ambrosini, and Alessandro Costacurta in filming a brief appearance in the 2006 Italian comedy Eccezzziunale veramente: Capitolo secondo...me, in which the main character (Diego Abatantuono) selects the Milan side in a dream sequence and wants Dida to play in attack due to his being Brazilian, with Shevchenko in goal instead. In a scene from another Italian film released that year, Il caimano, the title character (played by Silvio Orlando) is asked by his son whether Dida or Buffon is the better goalkeeper.

== Outside football ==
Dida gained Italian citizenship on 18 December 2013. That same year, a gymnasium in his home municipality of Lagoa da Canoa was named in his honour, and in April 2014, he met with its mayor Álvaro Melo to discuss youth participation in sports. On 11 September 2015, Dida was named an honorary citizen of Alagoas.

In 2014, Dida and then-Internacional teammates Juan and Andrés D'Alessandro filmed public service announcements for the Pan American Health Organization, which stressed the importance of vaccinations in order to prevent the spread of disease.

On 17 October 2018, Dida presented the Copa do Brasil at Arena Corinthians at the start of the second leg of the finals between Cruzeiro and Corinthians. He had won the trophy with both clubs in 1996 and 2002 respectively.

== Career statistics ==
=== Club ===
Appearances and goals by club, season and competition
Club	Season	League			Cup		Continental		Other		Total	
Club	Season	Division	Apps	Goals	Apps	Goals	Apps	Goals	Apps	Goals	Apps	Goals
Vitória	1992	Série B										
Vitória	1993	Série A	24	0							24	0
Vitória	Total											
Cruzeiro	1994	Série A	23	0			6	0			29	0
Cruzeiro	1995	Série A	20	0	3	0	8	0			31	0
Cruzeiro	1996	Série A	22	0	9	0					31	0
Cruzeiro	1997	Série A	25	0	2	0	20	0	1	0	48	0
Cruzeiro	1998	Série A	30	0	5	0	14	0			49	0
Cruzeiro	Total		120	0	19	0	48	0	1	0	188	0
Corinthians (loan)	1999	Série A	25	0	—		—		—		25	0
Corinthians (loan)	2000	Série A	—		—		11	0	4	0	15	0
Corinthians (loan)	Total		25	0	0	0	11	0	4	0	40	0
AC Milan	2000–01	Serie A	1	0	0	0	6	0	—		7	0
AC Milan	2002–03	Serie A	30	0	0	0	14	0	—		44	0
AC Milan	2003–04	Serie A	32	0	2	0	10	0	1	0	45	0
AC Milan	2004–05	Serie A	36	0	0	0	13	0	1	0	50	0
AC Milan	2005–06	Serie A	36	0	0	0	12	0	—		48	0
AC Milan	2006–07	Serie A	25	0	3	0	13	0	—		41	0
AC Milan	2007–08	Serie A	13	0	0	0	4	0	3	0	20	0
AC Milan	2008–09	Serie A	10	0	1	0	8	0	—		19	0
AC Milan	2009–10	Serie A	23	0	0	0	5	0	—		28	0
AC Milan	Total		206	0	6	0	85	0	5	0	302	0
Corinthians (loan)	2001	Série A	8	0	—		—		—		8	0
Corinthians (loan)	2002	Série A	—		9	0	—		18	0	27	0
Corinthians (loan)	Total		8	0	9	0	—		18	0	35	0
Portuguesa	2012	Série A	32	0	—		—		—		32	0
Grêmio	2013	Série A	37	0	6	0	8	0	9	0	60	0
Internacional	2014	Série A	27	0	5	0	2	0	7	0	41	0
Internacional	2015	Série A	0	0	0	0	0	0	1	0	1	0
Internacional	Total		27	0	5	0	2	0	8	0	42	0
Career total			479	0	45	0	152	0	38	0	723	0

=== International ===
Appearances and goals by national team and year
National team	Year	Apps	Goals
Brazil	1995	3	0
Brazil	1996	6	0
Brazil	1997	6	0
Brazil	1998	0	0
Brazil	1999	17	0
Brazil	2000	10	0
Brazil	2001	6	0
Brazil	2002	5	0
Brazil	2003	11	0
Brazil	2004	9	0
Brazil	2005	12	0
Brazil	2006	6	0
Total		91	0

== Honours ==
Vitória

- Campeonato Baiano: 1992

Cruzeiro

- Campeonato Mineiro: 1994, 1996, 1997, 1998
- Copa Master de Supercopa: 1995
- Copa de Oro: 1995
- Copa do Brasil: 1996
- Copa Libertadores: 1997

Corinthians

- Campeonato Brasileiro Série A: 1999
- Copa do Brasil: 2002
- Torneio Rio–São Paulo: 2002
- FIFA Club World Cup: 2000

AC Milan

- Serie A: 2003–04
- Coppa Italia: 2002–03
- Supercoppa Italiana: 2004
- UEFA Champions League: 2002–03, 2006–07
- UEFA Super Cup: 2003, 2007
- FIFA Club World Cup: 2007

Internacional

- Campeonato Gaúcho: 2014, 2015

Brazil Youth

- South American Youth Championship: 1992
- FIFA World Youth Championship: 1993
- CONMEBOL Men Pre-Olympic Tournament: 1996

Brazil

- FIFA World Cup: 2002
- Copa América: 1999
- FIFA Confederations Cup: 1997, 2005

Individual

- Placar Bola de Prata: 1993 (Vitória), 1996, 1998 (Cruzeiro), 1999 (Corinthians)
- IFFHS World's Best Goalkeeper silver ball: 2005
- IFFHS World's Best Goalkeeper bronze ball: 2004
- FIFPro World XI: 2005
- FIFPro Goalkeeper of the Year: 2005
- IFFHS Best Brazilian Goalkeeper of the 21st Century
- AC Milan Hall of Fame

== Filmography ==
Year	Title	Role
2006	Eccezzziunale veramente: Capitolo secondo...me	Himself (uncredited)

== See also ==
- List of athletes who came out of retirement
