= Powa Technologies =

Defunct UK-based payments company

- Logo
- Founder: Dan Wagner
- Defunct: 2016
- Fate: Bankrupted
- Headquarters: Heron Tower, Bishopsgate, London, United Kingdom
- Products: PowaTag* PowaPOS* PowaWeb
- Website: www.powa.com

Powa Technologies was a UK-based technology company, known for its commerce, mobile commerce and e-commerce services. The company's flagship product was the mobile application PowaTag. In February 2016, investment company Wellington Management appointed professional services firm Deloitte as administrators of Powa Technologies.

== History ==
Powa was founded in 2007 by British entrepreneur Dan Wagner. The company received the largest Series A funding round for a technology start-up at the time, collecting $76 million in August 2013. The investment attracted the attention of David Cameron.

In June 2014, Powa Technologies acquired Hong Kong business MPayMe and its ZNAP technology. Following the acquisition, Wagner suggested that Powa had an enterprise value of $2.6 billion.

In 2015, they announced that their planned LSE £1.6 billion float would be put on hold until the following year. By early 2016, the company had run into financial difficulties, missing payments to staff and third parties. Its Hong Kong office had failed to pay its employees wages on time and to its ex-employees within 7 days, with some employees having to seek help from the Labor Department. On 28 January 2016, Alessandro Gadotti became CEO of PowaTag in the effort of restructuring the business. During the administration, he also served as interim CEO for the Group, supporting the process and the sale of the companies in the group. On 19 February 2016, Powa Technologies was placed into administration, and on 23 February 2016, Powa Technologies made 74 of its London-based staff redundant. On 24 February 2016, Powa Technologies filed for bankruptcy and laid off most of their employees. The investment company Wellington Management appointed professional services firm Deloitte as administrators of PowaTag.

=== Revelations of false valuation ===
Business Insider revealed that most of Powa's 'contracts' had in fact only been non-binding letters of intent; and on 2 March 2016, Sky News revealed that two of Powa's core businesses, PowaWeb and PowaTag, had been sold. Under separate deals, PowaTag was sold to a private consortium led by former Powa Technologies director Ben White, while PowaWeb was sold in a buyout backed by Greenlight Digital, a UK-based digital group whose interests include Greenlight Commerce Platform and OneHydra for SEO.

After the collapse of the business, a series of articles by the Financial Times called into question several of the claims that had previously been made. Powa's self-proclaimed 2014 valuation of $2.6 billion was investigated, and it was concluded that $106 million (£75 million) was a more accurate figure. The claimed "10-year strategic alliance with ‘limitless’ potential” deal with China UnionPay that Dan Wagner personally described in a quote to the BBC as “Why did China UnionPay decide to partner with a little British technology company? We’ve trumped ApplePay and the rest of the world here...” was found to be unknown to China UnionPay who had their lawyers request that Powa stop making the false claims and the majority of the partners upon which the investment and consequent valuation had been based, were found to be just Letters of Intent at best.

== ZNAP ==
ZNAP was a mobile business platform developed by Hong Kong–based company MPayMe, a business technology company founded in 2010. ZNAP supported Internet (online shopping), mobile shopping (via mobile handsets), print (magazines, newspapers), outdoor ads (posters, bus shelters), television, and app-to-app. Basic features included electronic vouchers/coupons, real-time loyalty programme management, alongside secure/efficient mobile payments. The ZNAP mobile app was available for Apple iOS, Google Android, and BlackBerry OS supported devices.

In May 2014, ZNAP was acquired by Powa for US$75 million in an all share deal. ZNAP product and customers merged with Powa Technologies PowaTag division.

== PowaTag ==
PowaTag was a mobile payment enabling technology and mobile application by Powa Technologies. PowaTag was launched at a March 2014 event in New York by Powa CEO Dan Wagner. At the time of launch, more than 240 retailers were reported to have signed to use the service, but later reports revealed that most of the companies had only written non-binding letters of intent.

=== Features ===
With the app, users could make purchases using a smartphone, with payment and delivery details tied to a specific device. The app incorporated elements of QR code detection, audio recognition, and beacon technology. Audio watermarks in the form of inaudible tones embedded within radio, commercials, or live broadcast events were detectable by the app, taking users to a mobile commerce store where a purchase could be made.

== See also ==
- Contactless payment
- Electronic money
