= Dan Wagner =

British Internet entrepreneur (born 1963)

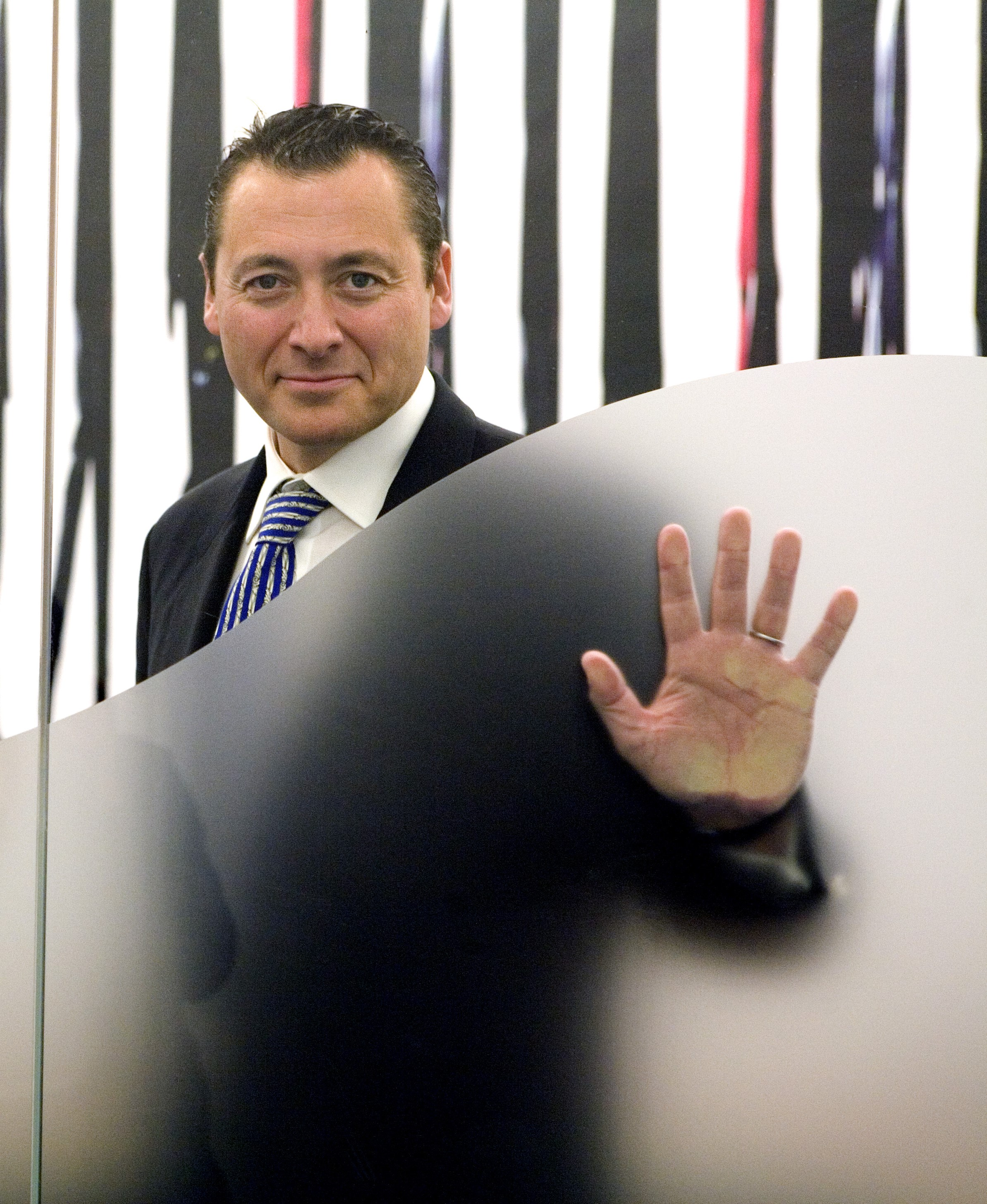
- Wagner in 2007
- Born: Daniel Maurice Wagner; 28 July 1963 (age 62); Edgware, Middlesex, England
- Occupation: Businessman
- Known for: Venda Inc, Powa Technologies
- Website: brightstation.com

Daniel Maurice Wagner (born 28 July 1963) is a British Internet entrepreneur. He created MAID, one of the first online information platforms in 1984. He was later the founder and CEO of Venda, ATTRAQT, Powa Technologies and most recently, Rezolve.

== Early life ==
Wagner was born in Edgware, Middlesex on 28 July 1963. He was educated at Merchant Taylors' School, Northwood but expelled when he was 13, before attending several schools, ending up at University College School, London.

Wagner dropped out of school when he was sixteen years old to work as a shop assistant for entrepreneur Julian Richer at Richer Sounds. Afterwards he joined an advertising agency as an account executive. There he came up with the idea of creating databases of records about businesses as a resource for marketing professionals.

== Career ==
=== MAID/Dialog ===
After Wagner left his job at the advertising agency, he founded the online information company MAID (Market Analysis Information Database) in 1984. The company grew quickly and obtained a 26 percent market-share. According to The Observer he was "one of the first people to realise the benefits of packaging electronic information and data for scientists, librarians and other specialists." The company went public on the stock market in 1994 and was renamed to Dialog. It was also listed on NASDAQ in 1995. Wagner became known for becoming a CEO of a public company in his 20s and for presiding over the company's share price decline in the dot-com crash in 2000. Subsequently, it was nicknamed by the city and a number of publications as 'Dial-a-dog'.

In 1997, Wagner agreed a deal to license search technology (InfoSort) to Fujitsu of Japan which was hailed by Prime Minister Tony Blair.

At a photo shoot ahead of the MAID IPO Wagner wore a Donald Duck waistcoat and this "flamboyant" attire was blamed for reducing the value of the company's shares by 10 p. In 1997 the share price of Dialog dropped 95 percent.

=== Venda Limited ===
In April 2001, Wagner founded Venda as one of the first cloud based, enterprise class commerce platforms using the technology assets from Boo.com as the foundation for the offering. He bought the Boo.com assets for just £250,000 after they had invested over £70 million in the platform and operations.

=== Attraqt ===
In 2003, Wagner co-founded Attraqt – an e-commerce software company – with CEO Andre Brown. Wagner served as the company's chairman until June 2016. He took Attraqt public on AIM in August 2014. and left as chairman in 2016.

=== Powa Technologies ===
In February 2016, the Financial Times reported that the company had missed payments to staff and third parties, two years after raising substantial sums in investment. On 19 February 2016, Powa Technologies went into administration.

After the collapse of Powa Technologies, a series of articles by The Financial Times and the BBC called into question several claims that had been made by Wagner during his tenure as CEO. Powa's self-proclaimed 2014 valuation of $2.6 billion was investigated and FT Alphaville concluded that £75 million was a more accurate figure. Most of the partners that Wagner claimed had signed deals with Powa were found to have instead signed non binding Letters of Intent that did not carry any obligations. In response to the criticism, Wagner told Business Insider in August 2016, "Regarding the LOIs, they were contracts committing the merchants to use Powa technology adhering to the terms and conditions published on the Powa website."

In November 2016, The Daily Telegraph reported Powa's administrators were examining payments made to offshore vehicles linked to Wagner and his associates. In November 2016, the newspaper City A.M. reported that Wagner was to enter into legal proceedings against a former Powa directors and investors, accusing them of colluding to force the company into administration.

In December 2017, the Times reported the High Court had dismissed Wagner's application to set aside a statutory demand for the repayment of a $2 million loan from former Powa director Ben White. White and Wagner subsequently settled all claims in a private agreement.

=== Rezolve ===
In 2017, Wagner founded mobile commerce platform Rezolve. Under Wagner, Rezolve developed a tool that allowed smartphone users to scan items in print and TV ads and purchase them, or request more information. The Financial Times noted Rezolve's function was similar to PowaTag, but Wagner told Business Insider he didn't use IP that didn't belong to him.
