= Sportal =

Sportal was a company of the dotcom boom at the end of the 1990s. Founded by Rob Hersov, and backed by BSkyB and Silvio Berlusconi's Fininvest among others, the company, originally called Pangolin, acquired rights to host a many official websites of Europe's leading football clubs (including Real Madrid, Juventus, AC Milan and Bayern Munich) as well as lower-profile sites across a number of other sports. It also opened offices across Europe, in South Africa, and in Australia and at its peak employed over 300 people.

In December 1999 it was valued at $170 million, and in the summer of 2000 it was named as the Sunday Times's #1 web company at the same time it ran the website for Euro 2000.

In the summer of 2000 Hersov was weeks away from selling the company to Vivendi Universal for £270m when market sentiment changed and the talks collapsed. Despite this, The Sunday Times named Sportal the No.1 e-business in the UK and it came out top in an e-league compiled by the web consultancy, Bathwick. But as the dot.com bubble burst, Sportal's size and lack of strong income streams quickly started to cause problems.

By March 2001 the company was in trouble and two rounds of redundancies saw two thirds of the staff laid off and savage spending cuts implemented. In April Hersov admitted Sportal was on the verge of closure if it did not secure more funding. Hersov injected his own money to keep the company afloat but even that did not arrest the slide.

In November 2001, UKbetting bought Sportal's domain names and trademark for £1 - marking the end of Sportal as a consumer website. It paid another £190,000 for the company's technology and took on two of Sportal's remaining 70 staff. The brand initially continued as sports content site then in 2002 relaunched the brand as a multi-sports broadband video portal sportal.com.

In 2008, Sportal also opened its office in Mumbai and their Indian-centric website, www.sportal.co.in, was launched in November 2010.
