= CiaoWeb =

Defunct Italian web portal

Ciaoweb
- Website type: Portal
- Owner: Fiat Group
- Website: http://www.ciaoweb.it/
- Registration: 1999; 27 years ago
- Launched: 18 December 1999
- Current status: Not Active

Ciaoweb was an Italian web portal started up by the FIAT Group with an initial investment of 200 billion Italian lira (100 million euro). The name "Ciaoweb" comes from the combination of "ciao" which represents the most immediate, direct, and simply way of greeting in Italy, and "web" which refers to the internet, reflecting its connection to Italy and web services. The project for the development of the portal had been assigned to a group of companies under the control of Ernst & Young and under the responsibility of Alessandro Gadotti, then partner at Ernst & Young. Paolo Ceretti from IFIL then took over as CEO, and Nino Olivotto as CTO.

== History ==
In 1999, the project originally had only an editorial component; its main goal was to create an Italian portal that could focus the attention of the Italian public on new Web technology. It was intended to be, in some ways, what Yahoo was in the United States. Ciaoweb was intended to become the reference portal at the national level. The editorial component was oversized compared to the other components of the project, and it immediately began to burn through the project's cash, which burned very quickly. To justify the huge investment, which is still very significant, it was hypothesized that it could act as a catalyst for all the companies of the Fiat Group (La Stampa, Alpitour, Ferrari, etc.), developing an experimental e-commerce platform. Ciaoholding, a company equally owned by the Fiat Group and IFIL, controlled Ciaoweb S.p.A., which managed the Ciaoweb portal, and another company called Ciaoservice, which offered business consulting and web development services for all Fiat Group companies. Milan was chosen as the company's headquarters instead of Turin, specifically specifically located at Centro Direzionale Milanofiori, Strada 3, Palazzo B2, Assago, Milano, where the staff, consisting of approximately 150 employees and 100 consultants, was allocated. Despite public attention, aided by advertising in traditional media, particularly those of the Fiat group, after just a few months, the project revealed all its weaknesses: extremely high management and publishing costs and a near-total lack of revenue, largely derived from the group's companies. The synergies created between Ciaoservizi and Fiat Group companies did not even begin to offset the high costs. In 2000, online advertising in Italy was still in its infancy, and the sector was dominated by advertising in traditional media, television, and newspapers. Therefore, the portal generated little or no revenue, primarily advertising Fiat Group companies. Furthermore, e-commerce was still in its infancy, and the number of people shopping online in Italy was very low, almost negligible. The portal was managed by 70 servers installed at the company headquarters, 60 running Windows NT and 10 running Unix. For its development used BroadVision framework, that was complex, cumbersome, and expensive, a huge investment of money that ultimately proved overpriced and burned cash. In 2000, Ciaoweb became the sponsor of the football team Juventus. After just one year, the project immediately began to significantly scale back. After just one year, the project immediately began to significantly scale back. The editorial side was significantly reduced, development was no longer pursued, and the number of employees and consultants was drastically reduced. With the dot-com crisis, the euphoria ended and Ciaoweb was the perfect Italian example; the project was deemed unsustainable. In 2001, the dot-com bubble burst and the portal was put up for sale. Even in Italy, the declines on the Italian stock market are evident and sharp. At the end of 2001, Hachette Rusconi Interactif (HRI) acquired CiaoHolding, which controlled Ciaoweb S.p.A., and the portal came under its management. In 2011, with the acquisition of Hachette Rusconi by Hearst Corporation, the domain came under its control. The portal was active with reduced graphics and content until March 2012 under the control of Hearst Magazines Italia S.p.A. In just under 13 years of use, from December 18, 1999 to March 2012, it proved to be a total failure due to the huge sums of money burned, but it was useful to many Italian technology companies in understanding how to invest in new technologies.
