= Thomas Job =

Cameroonian footballer (born 1984)

Personal information
- Full name: Thomas Hervé Job-Iyock
- Date of birth: 20 August 1984 (age 42)
- Place of birth: Douala, Cameroon
- Height: 1.75 m (5 ft 9 in)
- Position: Midfielder

Youth career
- San Paolo Yaounde
- 1999–2002: Sampdoria

Senior career*
Years	Team	Apps	(Gls)
2002–2006	Sampdoria	7	(0)
2002–2003	→ Cremonese (loan)	24	(11)
2004–2005	→ Pescara (loan)	34	(4)
2005–2006	→ Cremonese (loan)	32	(1)
2006–2008	Ascoli	38	(4)
2008–2009	Pisa	36	(1)
2009–2010	Grosseto	38	(1)
2010–2012	Cittadella	49	(2)
2012–2013	Bologna	0	(0)
2013–2014	Budapest Honvéd	31	(0)
Total		289	(24)

International career
2001	Cameroon U20		
2004	Cameroon U23		
- * Club domestic league appearances and goals

Thomas Hervé Job-Iyock (born 20 August 1984) is a Cameroonian former professional footballer who played as a midfielder.

== Career ==
Born in Douala, Cameroon, Job began his career in Italy with Sampdoria, making one appearance for the club in the 2001–02 season in Serie B, when he came on as a second-half substitute on 2 June 2002 in a 1–0 home defeat to Siena.

In February 2001 he was involved in an investigation by the Italian Football Federation over the alleged falsification of documents for him and two other African players at Sampdoria, along with three club officials. In July 2001, he was banned along with Jean Ondoa and Francis Zé.

He was sent on loan to Serie C2 club Cremonese for the 2002–03 season, where he made 24 appearances, scoring eleven goals. He returned to Sampdoria, who had been promoted back to Serie A for the 2003–04 season, and played three games. He then spent the 2004–05 season on loan with Pescara in Serie B. He made his debut for Pescara on 11 September 2004 as a 58th-minute substitute in a 2–1 home defeat to Piacenza. His first goal for the club came on 30 October in a 2–0 away win over Salernitana. He made a total of 34 appearances, scoring four goals.

The following season he returned to Cremonese on loan, who had by then been promoted to Serie B. He made 32 appearances, scoring one goal as the club were relegated back to Serie C. Later in 2006 he signed for Ascoli in Serie A in co-ownership deal for €500 and made his debut on 15 October 2006 in a 2–0 home defeat to Livorno. However, he made just five appearances in the 2006–07 season, as the club were relegated back to Serie B.

After playing one game for Ascoli in the 2008–09 season, against Vicenza on 30 August 2008 he signed for fellow Serie B club Pisa, making his debut on 13 September in a 1–0 home win over Modena. His first goal came on 27 September in a 1–1 draw at Salernitana.

In 2009 after Pisa relegated and bankrupted, he left for another Serie B club Grosseto.

On 17 August 2010 Job was signed by Cittadella, another second division club.

== Italian football scandal ==
Job was banned by Italian Football Federation on 18 June 2012 for three years and six months.
