= Jean Ondoa =

Cameroonian footballer

Personal information
- Full name: Jean Chrisostome Mekongo Ondoa
- Date of birth: 21 March 1983 (age 43)
- Place of birth: Douala, Cameroon
- Height: 1.85 m (6 ft 1 in)
- Position: Midfielder

Youth career
- A.S. Lea F.C. di Yaounde
- 2000–2001: Sampdoria

Senior career*
Years	Team	Apps	(Gls)
2001	Sampdoria	0	(0)
2002–2003	Cremonese	20+	(0)
2004	Bellinzona	9	(0)
2004–2005	Naftex Burgas	?	(?)
- * Club domestic league appearances and goals

Jean Chrisostome Mekongo Ondoa (born 21 March 1983 in Douala, Cameroon) is a Cameroonian footballer.

== Biography ==
Ondoa started his European career at Sampdoria. In February 2001, along with Thomas Job and Francis Zé, he was investigated by the FIGC for using false documents in order to be treated as a European Union citizen. The investigation found that he had used a fake French identity card to enter Italy and a fake Portuguese passport to finish the player registration, which was directed by his agent. In July 2001, all three were banned for 6 months. In February 2002, he was loaned to Cremonese along with Zé. In the 2002-03, season he remained at Cremonese and Job joined him on loan. Ondoa remained at Cremonese at the start of 2003-04 season.

In the middle of the 2003-04 season, he joined the Swiss Challenge League side (from the Italian speaking region) Bellinzona, playing his first match for them in round 17, losing 2-3 to Chiasso. During the 2004-05 season, he joined Naftex Burgas.
