= Francis Zé =

Cameroonian footballer

Personal information
- Date of birth: 15 January 1982 (age 44)
- Place of birth: Ebolowa, Cameroon
- Height: 1.74 m (5 ft 9 in)
- Position: Midfielder

Youth career
- 1999: Canon Yaoundé
- 1999–2001: Sampdoria

Senior career*
Years	Team	Apps	(Gls)
2001–2003	Sampdoria	1	(0)
2002	→ Cremonese (loan)	12	(0)
2004–2005	Chiasso	16	(0)
2007	Red Star Waasland	?	(?)
- * Club domestic league appearances and goals

Francis Zé (born 15 January 1982) is a Cameroonian former professional footballer who played as a midfielder.

== Career ==
Zé started his professional career with Sampdoria. In February 2001 along with Thomas Job and Jean Ondoa were investigated by FIGC for alleged falsification of documents in order to treat as a European Union citizen. In July 2001, they were banned for six months. In February 2002, he was loaned to Cremonese along with Ondoa.

In 2002–03 season Zé returned to Genoa and made his Serie B debut on 24 May 2003, replaced Andrea Rabito in the 80th minutes.

In 2004–05 season he left for Swiss Challenge League side Chiasso (but also from Italian speaking region), played 16 times.

In January 2007 he left for Red Star Waasland but his contract was not extended at the end of season.

In February 2004, he scored a goal for Cameroon Olympic team at 2004 CAF Men's Pre-Olympic Tournament.

== Honours ==
- Serie B: 2003
