= List of Juventus FC seasons =

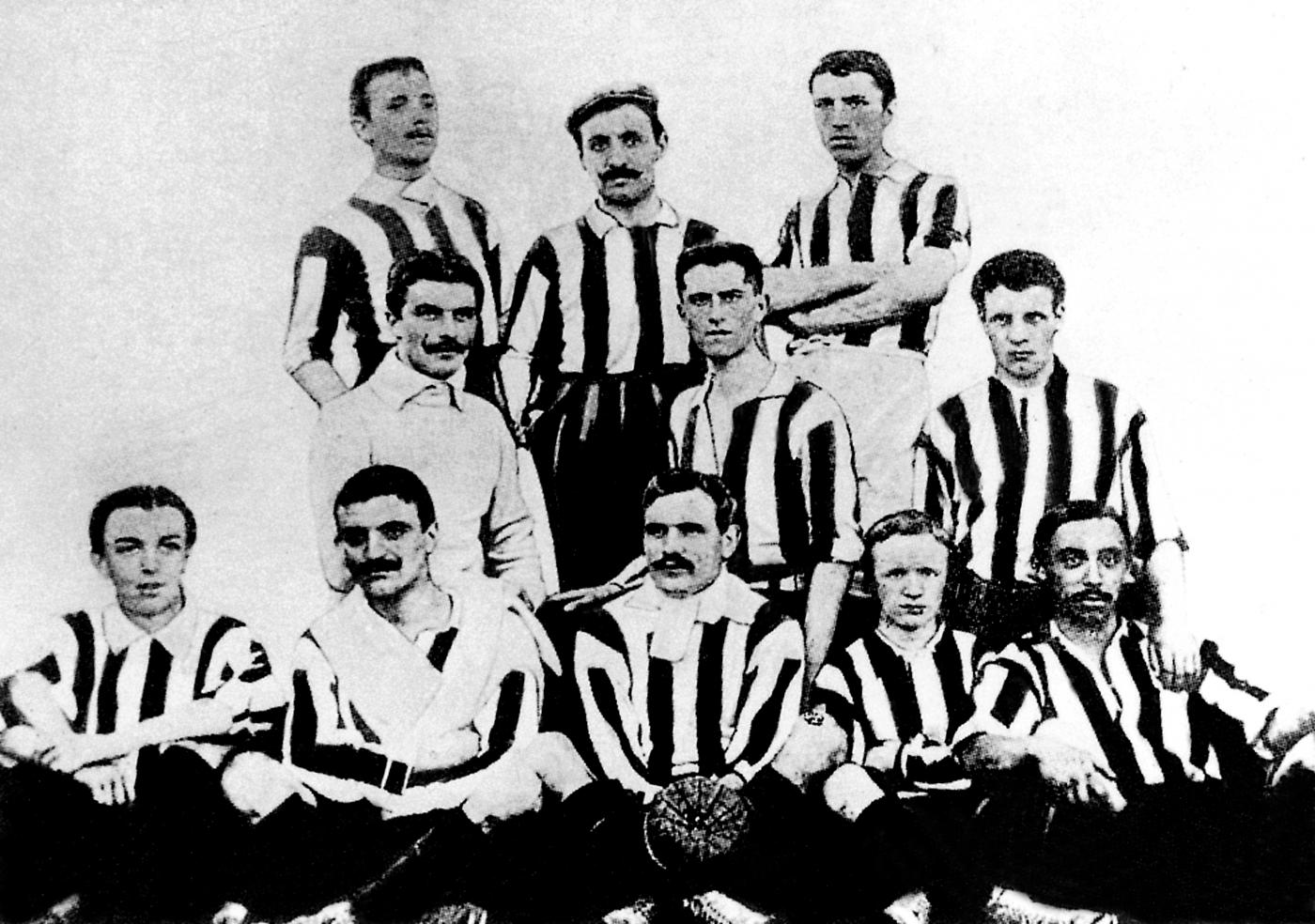
The Juventus team during the 1905 season in which they won their first league title

Juventus Football Club is an Italian professional association football club based in Turin, Piedmont. The club was founded as Sport-Club Juventus in late 1897 by pupils from the Massimo d'Azeglio Lyceum school in Turin, among them the brothers Eugenio and Enrico Canfari, but were renamed as Foot-Ball Club Juventus two years later. The club joined the Italian Football Championship in 1900. In 1904, the businessman Ajmone-Marsan revived the finances of the football club Juventus, making it also possible to transfer the training field from Piazza d'armi to the more appropriate Velodrome Umberto I. During this period, the team wore a pink and black kit. Juventus first won the league championship in 1905, while playing at their Velodrome Umberto I ground. By this time, the club colours had changed to black and white stripes, inspired by English side Notts County.

Juventus is the most successful club in Italian football and one of the most awarded globally. Overall, Juventus has won 71 official titles on the national and international stage, (Note: Including exclusively the official titles won during its participation in the top flight of Italian football.) more than any other Italian club: 36 official league titles, 15 Coppa Italia titles, nine Supercoppa Italiana titles, being the record holder in all these competitions; and, with 11 titles in confederation and inter-confederation competitions (two Intercontinental Cups, two European Champion Clubs' Cup/UEFA Champions Leagues, one European Cup Winners' Cup, three UEFA Cups, one UEFA Intertoto Cup and two UEFA Super Cups), the club ranks sixth in Europe and twelfth in the world with the most trophies won.

Under the first spell of headcoach Giovanni Trapattoni (1976–1986), the Torinese club won thirteen trophies in the ten years before 1986 (including six league titles, two national cup titles and five international titles) and became the first to win all three competitions organised by the UEFA: the European Champions' Cup, Cup Winners' Cup and UEFA Cup. With successive triumphs in the 1984 European Super Cup and 1985 Intercontinental Cup, the club became the first, and thus far, the first and only in association football history, to have won all possible confederation competitions, an achievement that it revalidated with the title won in the 1999 UEFA Intertoto Cup. This record has been valid until the conclusion of the first edition of the UEFA Europa Conference League in May 2022. Under the management of Marcello Lippi (1994–1999 and 2001–2004), the club had its second most successful cycle with five league titles and three international titles, along with a one Coppa Italia title, four Supercoppa Italiana titles and four further European finals, one UEFA Cup final and three Champions League finals (1997, 1998, 2003).

In May 2006, Juventus became one of the five clubs linked to a 2006 Italian football scandal, the result of which saw the club relegated to Serie B for the first time in its history, as well as being stripped of the two league titles won under Fabio Capello in 2005 and 2006. After returning to Serie A in the 2007–08 season, Juventus appointed Claudio Ranieri as manager and finished third and second in the following two years league. After two consecutive 7th-place finishes (its worst placement since 1954–57) and for the first time since the 1991–92 season, excluding the seasons 2006–07 and 2007–08 after the Calciopoli scandal, out of European competitions, newly Juventus chairmen Andrea Agnelli appointed former player Antonio Conte as manager in 2011, the same year, the club relocated to the new Juventus Stadium. Conte led Juventus to his first three league titles of the 2010s, including an unbeaten league title in 2012 and achieved a record 102 points and 33 wins in the 2013–14 season.

Following Conte's resignment, Massimiliano Allegri was appointed as manager and led Juventus to a national double in his first year. In the 2015–16 season, the club won their 5th straight title (and 32nd overall) since last winning five straight between 1930–31 and 1934–35, after climbing from 12th place and taking 73 points of a possible 75. The club also became the first team in Italy's history to complete Serie A and Coppa Italia doubles in back-to-back seasons. In the 2016–17 season, the club won their 12th Coppa Italia title, becoming the first team to win three consecutive championships. Juventus also secured their sixth consecutive league title, establishing an all-time record of successive triumphs in the competition. Juventus won their 13th Coppa Italia title, and fourth in a row, extending the all-time record of successive Coppa Italia titles. Four days later on 13 May, Juventus secured their seventh consecutive Serie A title, extending the all-time record of successive triumphs in the competition. On 20 April 2019, Juventus secured their eighth consecutive Serie A title, with Allegri departing Juventus at the end of the season. A year later, on 26 July 2020, the club secured a ninth consecutive title under new manager Maurizio Sarri, pushing their unprecedented record to new heights. On 2 May 2021, under new manager Andrea Pirlo, Juventus' run of nine consecutive titles was mathematically ended by Internazionale, who were confirmed as champions. Pirlo's experience ended in late May, and Allegri returned sitting on Juventus' bench. After losing the 2022 Coppa Italia final to Internazionale, Juventus ended the 2021–22 season trophyless for the first time after ten years.

== Key ==
- CL = UEFA Champions League
- EC = European Cup
- EL = UEFA Europa League
- UC = UEFA Cup
- ICFC = Inter-Cities Fairs Cup
- UIC = UEFA Intertoto Cup
- CWC = European Cup Winners' Cup
- ESC = European Super Cup
- USC = UEFA Super Cup
- IC = Intercontinental Cup
- CDA = Cup of the Alps
- AIC = Anglo-Italian Cup
- MIT = Mitropa Cup
- AMI = Coppa dell'Amicizia
- LC = Latin Cup
- CR = Copa Rio
- TP = Memorial Armando Picchi
- Pld = Matches played
- W = Matches won
- D = Matches drawn
- L = Matches lost
- GF = Goals for
- GA = Goals against
- Pts = Points
- Pos = Final position
- F = Final
- SF = Semi-finals
- QF = Quarter-finals
- R16 = Round of 16
- R32 = Round of 32
- KPO = Knockout phase play-offs
- GS = Group stage
- GS2 = Second group stage
- N/A = Did not qualify
- – = Tournament did not occur
- QR1 = First qualifying round
- QR2 = Second qualifying round
- QR3 = Third qualifying round
- QR4 = Fourth qualifying round
- RInt = Intermediate round
- R1 = Round 1
- R2 = Round 2
- R3 = Round 3
- R4 = Round 4
- R5 = Round 5
- R6 = Round 6

| Winner | Runners-up | Third place | Promotion | Relegation | Top goalscorer in Serie A |

== Seasons ==
The first official national football tournament was organised in 1898 by the Italian Football Federation (Italian: Federazione Italiana del Football – FIF, before changing its name in Federazione Italiana Giuoco Calcio – FIGC by 1909).

In the following years, the tournament (called Prima Categoria) was structured into regional groups, with the winners of each group participating in a playoff with the eventual winners being declared champions. From 1921 to 1926, Prima Divisione was founded as the first level of the Italian Football Championship. Regarding to the dispute between major clubs and FIGC, Divisione Nazionale was created in the following three years as the new national top league where Northern and Southern teams played in the same championship from 1926 to 1929. In 1929, Divisione Nazionale (two groups of 16 teams each) split into two championships: Divisione Nazionale Serie A (the new Top Division) and Divisione Nazionale Serie B (the new second level of Italian Football).

In the current format of Serie A, the Italian Football Championship was revised from having regional and interregional rounds to a single-tier league from the 1929–30 season onward.

| Season | League^{1} | | | | | | | | | Coppa Italia^{2} | Continental | Supercoppa Italiana^{3} | Manager(s) | Top goalscorer(s)^{4} | |
| Season | Division | Pld | W | D | L | GF | GA | Pts | Pos | Coppa Italia^{2} | Continental | Supercoppa Italiana^{3} | Manager(s) | Top goalscorer(s)^{4} | |
|---|---|---|---|---|---|---|---|---|---|---|---|---|---|---|---|
| 1897–98 | | | | | | | | | | – | – | – | | | |
| 1899 | | | | | | | | | | – | – | – | | | |
| 1900 | Campionato Nazionale di Football/Piemonte | 4 | 2 | 0 | 2 | 5 | 3 | 4 | 2nd | – | – | – | | | |
| 1901 | Campionato Italiano di Football | 2 | 1 | 0 | 1 | 7 | 3 | 2 | 3rd | – | – | – | | | |
| 1902 | Campionato Italiano di Football/Piemontese | 4 | 2 | 1 | 1 | 10 | 5 | 5 | 2nd | – | – | – | | | |
| 1902–03 | Campionato Italiano di Football | 5 | 4 | 0 | 1 | 16 | 5 | 8 | 2nd | – | – | – | | | |
| 1903–04 | Prima Categoria | 4 | 2 | 1 | 1 | 7 | 4 | 5 | 2nd | – | – | – | | | |
| 1904–05 | Prima Categoria | 4 | 2 | 2 | 0 | 9 | 3 | 6 | 1st | – | – | – | | (Italy) Domenico Donna (Italy) Luigi Forlano | 3 |
| 1904–05 | Seconda Categoria | 4 | 4 | 0 | 0 | 5 | 0 | 8 | 1st | – | – | – | | | |
| 1905–06 | Prima Categoria | 4 | 2 | 1 | 1 | 5 | 3 | 5 | 2nd | – | – | – | | | |
| 1905–06 | Seconda Categoria | 6 | 3 | 0 | 3 | 7 | 7 | 6 | 3rd | – | – | – | | | |
| 1906–07 | Prima Categoria/Piemonte | 2 | 0 | 0 | 2 | 2 | 6 | 0 | 2nd | – | – | – | | | |
| 1906–07 | Seconda Categoria/Piemonte | 4 | 2 | 0 | 2 | 4 | 3 | 4 | 2nd | – | – | – | | | |
| 1907–08 | Campionato Italiano di Prima Categoria | 2 | 0 | 1 | 1 | 1 | 3 | 1 | 4th | – | – | – | | | |
| 1907–08 | Campionato Federale di Prima Categoria/Piemonte | 4 | 2 | 1 | 1 | 10 | 4 | 5 | 1st | – | – | – | | | |
| 1908–09 | Campionato Federale di Prima Categoria/Piemonte | 3 | 1 | 0 | 2 | 3 | 3 | 2 | 3rd | – | – | – | | | |
| 1908–09 | Campionato Italiano di Prima Categoria | 6 | 4 | 1 | 1 | 10 | 7 | 9 | 1st | – | – | – | | | |
| 1909–10 | Prima Categoria | 16 | 8 | 2 | 6 | 29 | 20 | 18 | 3rd | – | – | – | | | |
| 1910–11 | Prima Categoria | 16 | 3 | 4 | 9 | 16 | 29 | 10 | 9th | – | – | – | | | |
| 1911–12 | Prima Categoria | 18 | 3 | 3 | 12 | 22 | 37 | 9 | 8th | – | – | – | | | |
| 1912–13 | Prima Categoria | 10 | 1 | 1 | 8 | 14 | 35 | 3 | 6th | – | – | – | | | |
| 1913–14 | Prima Categoria | 28 | 17 | 4 | 7 | 85 | 42 | 38 | 4th | – | – | – | | | |
| 1914–15 | Prima Categoria | 16 | 11 | 1 | 4 | 61 | 28 | 23 | 3rd | – | – | – | | | |
No competitive football was played between 1915 and 1919 due to the First World War
| 1919–20 | Prima Categoria | 22 | 15 | 5 | 2 | 49 | 12 | 35 | 2nd | – | – | – | | (Italy) Pio Ferraris | 15 |
| 1920–21 | Prima Categoria/A | 10 | 4 | 3 | 3 | 27 | 14 | 11 | 4th | – | – | – | | (Italy) Pio Ferraris | 7 |
| 1921–22 | Prima Divisione (CCI)/A | 22 | 7 | 9 | 6 | 27 | 31 | 22 | 6th | R3 | – | – | | (Italy) Pio Ferraris | 10 |
| 1922–23 | Prima Divisione/B | 22 | 10 | 5 | 7 | 31 | 23 | 25 | 5th | – | – | – | | (Italy) Francesco Blando | 12 |
| 1923–24 | Prima Divisione/A | 22 | 11 | 4 | 7 | 37 | 27 | 26 | 6th | – | – | – | (Hungary) Jenő Károly | (Italy) Pietro Pastore | 8 |
| 1924–25 | Prima Divisione/B | 24 | 12 | 8 | 4 | 38 | 21 | 32 | 3rd | – | – | – | (Hungary) Jenő Károly | (Italy) Federico Munerati | 14 |
| 1925–26 | Prima Divisione | 24 | 19 | 3 | 2 | 80 | 15 | 41 | 1st | – | – | – | (Hungary) Jenő Károly (Hungary) József Viola | (Austria) Ferenc Hirzer | 35 |
| 1926–27 | Divisione Nazionale | 28 | 17 | 4 | 7 | 68 | 23 | 38 | 3rd | R32 | – | – | (Hungary) József Viola | | |
| 1927–28 | Divisione Nazionale | 34 | 16 | 8 | 10 | 60 | 41 | 40 | 3rd | – | – | – | (Hungary) József Viola | | |
| 1928–29 | Divisione Nazionale/B | 30 | 16 | 9 | 5 | 76 | 25 | 41 | 2nd | – | MIT QF | – | (Scotland) William Aitken | | |
| 1929–30 | Serie A | 34 | 19 | 7 | 8 | 56 | 31 | 45 | 3rd | – | – | – | (Scotland) William Aitken | (Italy) (Argentina) Raimundo Orsi | 15 |
| 1930–31 | Serie A | 34 | 25 | 5 | 4 | 79 | 37 | 55 | 1st | – | MIT QF | – | (Italy) Carlo Carcano | (Italy) (Argentina) Raimundo Orsi | 20 |
| 1931–32 | Serie A | 34 | 24 | 6 | 4 | 89 | 38 | 54 | 1st | – | MIT SF | – | (Italy) Carlo Carcano | (Italy) (Argentina) Raimundo Orsi | 19 |
| 1932–33 | Serie A | 34 | 25 | 4 | 5 | 83 | 23 | 54 | 1st | – | MIT SF | – | (Italy) Carlo Carcano | (Italy) Felice Borel | 29 |
| 1933–34 | Serie A | 34 | 23 | 7 | 4 | 88 | 31 | 53 | 1st | – | MIT SF | – | (Italy) Carlo Carcano | (Italy) Felice Borel | 31 |
| 1934–35 | Serie A | 30 | 18 | 8 | 4 | 45 | 22 | 44 | 1st | – | MIT SF | – | (Italy) Carlo Carcano (Italy) Carlo Bigatto (Italy) Benè Gola | (Italy) Felice Borel | 12 |
| 1935–36 | Serie A | 30 | 13 | 9 | 8 | 46 | 33 | 35 | 5th | QF | – | – | (Italy) Virginio Rosetta | (Italy) Guglielmo Gabetto | 20 |
| 1936–37 | Serie A | 30 | 12 | 11 | 7 | 53 | 31 | 35 | 5th | R16 | – | – | (Italy) Virginio Rosetta | (Italy) Guglielmo Gabetto | 18 |
| 1937–38 | Serie A | 30 | 14 | 11 | 5 | 43 | 22 | 39 | 2nd | Champions | MIT SF | – | (Italy) Virginio Rosetta | (Italy) Guglielmo Gabetto | 9 |
| 1938–39 | Serie A | 30 | 8 | 13 | 9 | 28 | 34 | 39 | 8th | R16 | – | – | (Italy) Virginio Rosetta | (Italy) Guglielmo Gabetto | 10 |
| 1939–40 | Serie A | 30 | 15 | 6 | 9 | 45 | 40 | 36 | 3rd | SF | – | – | (Italy) Umberto Caligaris | (Italy) Guglielmo Gabetto | 12 |
| 1940–41 | Serie A | 30 | 12 | 8 | 10 | 50 | 47 | 32 | 5th | R16 | – | – | (Italy) Umberto Caligaris (Italy) Federico Munerati | (Italy) Guglielmo Gabetto | 16 |
| 1941–42 | Serie A | 30 | 12 | 8 | 10 | 47 | 41 | 32 | 6th | Champions | – | – | (Italy) Giovanni Ferrari (Italy) (Argentina) Luis Monti | (Albania) Riza Lushta | 19 |
| 1942–43 | Serie A | 30 | 16 | 5 | 9 | 75 | 55 | 37 | 3rd | R16 | – | – | (Italy) Felice Borel (Italy) (Argentina) Luis Monti | (Italy) Vittorio Sentimenti | 19 |
No competitive football was played between 1944 and 1945 due to the Second World War
| 1945–46 | Divisione Nazionale | 40 | 22 | 12 | 6 | 83 | 31 | 56 | 2nd | – | – | – | (Italy) Felice Borel | (Italy) Silvio Piola | 16 |
| 1946–47 | Serie A | 38 | 22 | 9 | 7 | 83 | 38 | 53 | 2nd | – | – | – | (Italy) (Argentina) Renato Cesarini | (Italy) Mario Astorri | 17 |
| 1947–48 | Serie A | 40 | 19 | 11 | 10 | 74 | 48 | 49 | 3rd | – | – | – | (Italy) (Argentina) Renato Cesarini | (Italy) Giampiero Boniperti | 26 |
| 1948–49 | Serie A | 38 | 18 | 8 | 12 | 64 | 47 | 44 | 4th | – | – | – | (Scotland) Billy Chalmers | (Denmark) John Hansen | 15 |
| 1949–50 | Serie A | 38 | 28 | 6 | 4 | 100 | 43 | 62 | 1st | – | – | – | (England) Jesse Carver | (Denmark) John Hansen | 28 |
| 1950–51 | Serie A | 38 | 23 | 8 | 7 | 103 | 44 | 54 | 3rd | – | CR RU | – | (England) Jesse Carver (Italy) Luigi Bertolini | (Denmark) Karl Aage Hansen | 25 |
| 1951–52 | Serie A | 38 | 26 | 8 | 4 | 98 | 34 | 60 | 1st | – | LC 3rd | – | (England) Jesse Carver (Italy) Luigi Bertolini (Hungary) György Sárosi | (Denmark) John Hansen | 28 |
| 1952–53 | Serie A | 34 | 18 | 9 | 7 | 73 | 40 | 45 | 2nd | – | – | – | (Hungary) György Sárosi | (Denmark) John Hansen | 22 |
| 1953–54 | Serie A | 34 | 20 | 10 | 4 | 58 | 34 | 50 | 2nd | – | – | – | (Italy) Aldo Olivieri | (Italy) Eduardo Ricagni | 17 |
| 1954–55 | Serie A | 34 | 12 | 13 | 9 | 60 | 53 | 37 | 7th | – | – | – | (Italy) Aldo Olivieri | (Denmark) Helge Bronée | 11 |
| 1955–56 | Serie A | 34 | 8 | 17 | 9 | 32 | 37 | 33 | 12th | – | N/A | – | (Italy) Sandro Puppo | (Brazil) Nardo | 7 |
| 1956–57 | Serie A | 34 | 11 | 11 | 12 | 54 | 54 | 33 | 9th | – | N/A | – | (Italy) Sandro Puppo | (Italy) Giorgio Stivanello | 11 |
| 1957–58 | Serie A | 34 | 23 | 5 | 6 | 77 | 44 | 51 | 1st (10th title) | SF | N/A | – | (Socialist Federal Republic of Yugoslavia) Ljubiša Broćić | (Wales) John Charles | 28 |
| 1958–59 | Serie A | 34 | 16 | 10 | 8 | 74 | 51 | 42 | 4th | Champions | EC R32 AMI Champions | – | (Socialist Federal Republic of Yugoslavia) Ljubiša Broćić (Italy) Teobaldo Depetrini | (Wales) John Charles | 19 |
| 1959–60 | Serie A | 34 | 25 | 5 | 4 | 92 | 33 | 55 | 1st | Champions | AMI Champions | – | (Italy) Carlo Parola | (Italy) (Argentina) Omar Sívori | 28 |
| 1960–61 | Serie A | 34 | 22 | 5 | 7 | 80 | 42 | 49 | 1st | SF | EC R32 | – | (Italy) Carlo Parola | (Italy) (Argentina) Omar Sívori | 25 |
| 1961–62 | Serie A | 34 | 10 | 9 | 15 | 48 | 56 | 29 | 12th | SF | EC QF MIT GS | – | (Czech Republic) Július Korostelev (Italy) Carlo Parola (Sweden) Gunnar Gren | (Italy) (Argentina) Omar Sívori | 13 |
| 1962–63 | Serie A | 34 | 18 | 9 | 7 | 50 | 25 | 45 | 2nd | QF | CDA Champions | – | (Brazil) Paulo Amaral | (Italy) (Argentina) Omar Sívori | 16 |
| 1963–64 | Serie A | 34 | 14 | 10 | 10 | 49 | 37 | 28 | 5th | SF | ICFC QF | – | (Brazil) Paulo Amaral (Italy) Eraldo Monzeglio | (Italy) (Argentina) Omar Sívori | 13 |
| 1964–65 | Serie A | 34 | 15 | 11 | 8 | 43 | 24 | 41 | 4th | Champions | ICFC Runners-up | – | (Paraguay) Heriberto Herrera | (Italy) Giampaolo Menichelli | 11 |
| 1965–66 | Serie A | 34 | 13 | 16 | 5 | 38 | 23 | 42 | 5th | SF | CWC R1 | – | (Paraguay) Heriberto Herrera | (Italy) Silvino Bercellino (Italy) Giampaolo Menichelli | 6 |
| 1966–67 | Serie A | 34 | 18 | 13 | 3 | 44 | 19 | 49 | 1st | SF | ICFC QF CDA Runners-up | – | (Paraguay) Heriberto Herrera | (Italy) Giampaolo Menichelli | 11 |
| 1967–68 | Serie A | 30 | 13 | 10 | 7 | 33 | 29 | 36 | 3rd | R1 | EC SF | – | (Paraguay) Heriberto Herrera | (Italy) Virginio De Paoli | 8 |
| 1968–69 | Serie A | 30 | 12 | 11 | 7 | 32 | 24 | 35 | 5th | QF | ICFC R2 | – | (Paraguay) Heriberto Herrera | (Italy) Pietro Anastasi | 15 |
| 1969–70 | Serie A | 30 | 15 | 8 | 7 | 43 | 20 | 38 | 3rd | QF | ICFC R2 AIC GS | – | (Argentina) Luis Carniglia (Italy) Ercole Rabitti | (Italy) Pietro Anastasi | 15 |
| 1970–71 | Serie A | 30 | 11 | 13 | 6 | 41 | 30 | 35 | 4th | GS | ICFC Runners-up TP 3rd | – | (Italy) Armando Picchi (Czechoslovakia) Čestmír Vycpálek | (Italy) Roberto Bettega | 13 |
| 1971–72 | Serie A | 30 | 17 | 9 | 4 | 48 | 24 | 43 | 1st | R2 | UC QF | – | (Czechoslovakia) Čestmír Vycpálek | (Italy) Pietro Anastasi | 11 |
| 1972–73 | Serie A | 30 | 18 | 9 | 3 | 45 | 22 | 45 | 1st | Runners-up | EC Runners-up | – | (Czechoslovakia) Čestmír Vycpálek | (Brazil) (Italy) José Altafini | 9 |
| 1973–74 | Serie A | 30 | 16 | 9 | 5 | 50 | 26 | 41 | 2nd | R2 | EC R1 IC Runners-up | – | (Czechoslovakia) Čestmír Vycpálek | (Italy) Pietro Anastasi | 16 |
| 1974–75 | Serie A | 30 | 18 | 7 | 5 | 49 | 19 | 43 | 1st | R2 | UC SF | – | (Czechoslovakia) Čestmír Vycpálek (Italy) Carlo Parola | (Italy) Pietro Anastasi (Italy) Oscar Damiani | 9 |
| 1975–76 | Serie A | 30 | 18 | 7 | 5 | 46 | 26 | 43 | 2nd | R1 | EC R2 | – | (Italy) Carlo Parola | (Italy) Roberto Bettega | 15 |
| 1976–77 | Serie A | 30 | 23 | 5 | 2 | 50 | 20 | 51 | 1st | R2 | UC Champions | – | (Italy) Giovanni Trapattoni | (Italy) Roberto Bettega | 17 |
| 1977–78 | Serie A | 30 | 15 | 14 | 1 | 46 | 17 | 44 | 1st | R2 | EC SF | – | (Italy) Giovanni Trapattoni | (Italy) Roberto Bettega | 11 |
| 1978–79 | Serie A | 30 | 12 | 13 | 5 | 40 | 23 | 37 | 3rd | Champions | EC R1 | – | (Italy) Giovanni Trapattoni | (Italy) Roberto Bettega | 9 |
| 1979–80 | Serie A | 30 | 16 | 6 | 8 | 42 | 25 | 38 | 2nd | SF | CWC SF | – | (Italy) Giovanni Trapattoni | (Italy) Roberto Bettega | 16 |
| 1980–81 | Serie A | 30 | 17 | 10 | 3 | 46 | 15 | 44 | 1st | SF | UC R2 | – | (Italy) Giovanni Trapattoni | (Republic of Ireland) Liam Brady | 8 |
| 1981–82 | Serie A | 30 | 19 | 8 | 3 | 48 | 14 | 46 | 1st (20th title) | GS | EC R2 | – | (Italy) Giovanni Trapattoni | (Italy) Pietro Paolo Virdis | 9 |
| 1982–83 | Serie A | 30 | 15 | 9 | 6 | 49 | 26 | 39 | 2nd | Champions | EC Runners-up | – | (Italy) Giovanni Trapattoni | (France) Michel Platini | 16 |
| 1983–84 | Serie A | 30 | 17 | 9 | 4 | 57 | 29 | 43 | 1st | R16 | CWC Champions | – | (Italy) Giovanni Trapattoni | (France) Michel Platini | 20 |
| 1984–85 | Serie A | 30 | 11 | 14 | 5 | 48 | 33 | 36 | 6th | QF | EC Champions ESC Champions | – | (Italy) Giovanni Trapattoni | (France) Michel Platini | 18 |
| 1985–86 | Serie A | 30 | 18 | 9 | 3 | 43 | 17 | 45 | 1st | R16 | EC QF IC Champions | – | (Italy) Giovanni Trapattoni | (France) Michel Platini | 12 |
| 1986–87 | Serie A | 30 | 14 | 11 | 5 | 42 | 27 | 39 | 2nd | QF | EC R2 | – | (Italy) Rino Marchesi | (Italy) Aldo Serena | 10 |
| 1987–88 | Serie A | 30 | 11 | 9 | 10 | 35 | 30 | 31 | 6th | SF | UC R2 | – ^{*} | (Italy) Rino Marchesi | (Wales) Ian Rush | 7 |
| 1988–89 | Serie A | 34 | 15 | 13 | 6 | 51 | 36 | 43 | 4th | R2 | UC QF | N/A | (Italy) Dino Zoff | (Portugal) Rui Barros | 12 |
| 1989–90 | Serie A | 34 | 15 | 14 | 5 | 56 | 36 | 44 | 4th | Champions | UC Champions | N/A | (Italy) Dino Zoff | (Italy) Salvatore Schillaci | 15 |
| 1990–91 | Serie A | 34 | 13 | 11 | 10 | 45 | 32 | 37 | 7th | QF | CWC SF | Runners-up | (Italy) Luigi Maifredi | (Italy) Roberto Baggio | 14 |
| 1991–92 | Serie A | 34 | 18 | 12 | 4 | 45 | 22 | 48 | 2nd | Runners-up | N/A | N/A | (Italy) Giovanni Trapattoni | (Italy) Roberto Baggio | 18 |
| 1992–93 | Serie A | 34 | 15 | 9 | 10 | 59 | 47 | 39 | 4th | SF | UC Champions | N/A | (Italy) Giovanni Trapattoni | (Italy) Roberto Baggio | 21 |
| 1993–94 | Serie A | 34 | 17 | 13 | 4 | 58 | 25 | 47 | 2nd | R2 | UC QF | N/A | (Italy) Giovanni Trapattoni | (Italy) Roberto Baggio | 17 |
| 1994–95 | Serie A | 34 | 23 | 4 | 7 | 59 | 32 | 73 | 1st | Champions | UC Runners-up | N/A | (Italy) Marcello Lippi | (Italy) Gianluca Vialli | 17 |
| 1995–96 | Serie A | 34 | 19 | 8 | 7 | 58 | 35 | 65 | 2nd | R3 | CL Champions | Champions | (Italy) Marcello Lippi | (Italy) Fabrizio Ravanelli | 12 |
| 1996–97 | Serie A | 34 | 17 | 14 | 3 | 51 | 24 | 65 | 1st | QF | CL Runners-up USC Champions IC Champions | N/A | (Italy) Marcello Lippi | (Italy) Alessandro Del Piero (Italy) Michele Padovano (Italy) Christian Vieri | 8 |
| 1997–98 | Serie A | 34 | 21 | 11 | 2 | 67 | 28 | 74 | 1st | SF | CL Runners-up | Champions | (Italy) Marcello Lippi | (Italy) Alessandro Del Piero | 21 |
| 1998–99 | Serie A | 34 | 15 | 9 | 10 | 42 | 36 | 54 | 7th | QF | CL SF | Runners-up | (Italy) Marcello Lippi (Italy) Carlo Ancelotti | (Italy) Filippo Inzaghi | 13 |
| 1999–2000 | Serie A | 34 | 21 | 8 | 5 | 46 | 20 | 71 | 2nd | QF | UIC Champions UC R4 | N/A | (Italy) Carlo Ancelotti | (Italy) Filippo Inzaghi | 15 |
| 2000–01 | Serie A | 34 | 21 | 10 | 3 | 61 | 27 | 73 | 2nd | R16 | CL GS | N/A | (Italy) Carlo Ancelotti | (France) David Trezeguet | 14 |
| 2001–02 | Serie A | 34 | 20 | 11 | 3 | 64 | 23 | 71 | 1st | Runners-up | CL GS2 | N/A | (Italy) Marcello Lippi | (France) David Trezeguet | 24 |
| 2002–03 | Serie A | 34 | 21 | 9 | 4 | 64 | 29 | 72 | 1st | QF | CL Runners-up | Champions | (Italy) Marcello Lippi | (Italy) Alessandro Del Piero | 16 |
| 2003–04 | Serie A | 34 | 21 | 6 | 7 | 67 | 42 | 69 | 3rd | Runners-up | CL R16 | Champions | (Italy) Marcello Lippi | (France) David Trezeguet | 16 |
| 2004–05 | Serie A | 38 | 26 | 8 | 4 | 67 | 27 | 86 | 1st | R16 | CL QF | N/A | (Italy) Fabio Capello | (Sweden) Zlatan Ibrahimović | 16 |
| 2005–06 | Serie A | 38 | 27 | 10 | 1 | 71 | 24 | 91 | 20th | QF | CL QF | Runners-up | (Italy) Fabio Capello | (France) David Trezeguet | 23 |
| 2006–07 | Serie B | 42 | 28 | 10 | 4 | 83 | 30 | 85 | 1st | R3 | N/A | N/A | (France) Didier Deschamps (Italy) Giancarlo Corradini | (Italy) Alessandro Del Piero | 20 |
| 2007–08 | Serie A | 38 | 20 | 12 | 6 | 72 | 37 | 72 | 3rd | QF | N/A | N/A | (Italy) Claudio Ranieri | (Italy) Alessandro Del Piero | 21 |
| 2008–09 | Serie A | 38 | 21 | 11 | 6 | 69 | 37 | 74 | 2nd | SF | CL R16 | N/A | (Italy) Claudio Ranieri (Italy) Ciro Ferrara | (Italy) Alessandro Del Piero | 13 |
| 2009–10 | Serie A | 38 | 16 | 7 | 15 | 55 | 56 | 55 | 7th | QF | CL GS EL R16 | N/A | (Italy) Ciro Ferrara (Italy) Alberto Zaccheroni | (Italy) Alessandro Del Piero | 9 |
| 2010–11 | Serie A | 38 | 15 | 13 | 10 | 57 | 47 | 58 | 7th | QF | EL GS | N/A | (Italy) Luigi Delneri | (Italy) Alessandro Matri (Italy) Fabio Quagliarella | 9 |
| 2011–12 | Serie A | 38 | 23 | 15 | 0 | 68 | 20 | 84 | 1st | Runners-up | N/A | N/A | (Italy) Antonio Conte | (Italy) Alessandro Matri | 10 |
| 2012–13 | Serie A | 38 | 27 | 6 | 5 | 71 | 24 | 87 | 1st | SF | CL QF | Champions | (Italy) Antonio Conte | (Chile) Arturo Vidal (Montenegro) Mirko Vučinić | 10 |
| 2013–14 | Serie A | 38 | 33 | 3 | 2 | 80 | 23 | 102 | 1st (30th title)^{5} | QF | CL GS EL SF | Champions | (Italy) Antonio Conte | (Argentina) Carlos Tevez | 19 |
| 2014–15 | Serie A | 38 | 26 | 9 | 3 | 72 | 24 | 87 | 1st | Champions (10th title)^{6} | CL Runners-up | Runners-up | (Italy) Massimiliano Allegri | (Argentina) Carlos Tevez | 20 |
| 2015–16 | Serie A | 38 | 29 | 4 | 5 | 75 | 20 | 91 | 1st | Champions | CL R16 | Champions | (Italy) Massimiliano Allegri | (Argentina) Paulo Dybala | 19 |
| 2016–17 | Serie A | 38 | 29 | 4 | 5 | 77 | 27 | 91 | 1st | Champions | CL Runners-up | Runners-up | (Italy) Massimiliano Allegri | (Argentina) Gonzalo Higuaín | 24 |
| 2017–18 | Serie A | 38 | 30 | 5 | 3 | 86 | 24 | 95 | 1st | Champions | CL QF | Runners-up | (Italy) Massimiliano Allegri | (Argentina) Paulo Dybala | 22 |
| 2018–19 | Serie A | 38 | 28 | 6 | 4 | 70 | 30 | 90 | 1st | QF | CL QF | Champions | (Italy) Massimiliano Allegri | (Portugal) Cristiano Ronaldo | 21 |
| 2019–20 | Serie A | 38 | 26 | 5 | 7 | 76 | 43 | 83 | 1st | Runners-up | CL R16 | Runners-up | (Italy) Maurizio Sarri | (Portugal) Cristiano Ronaldo | 31 |
| 2020–21 | Serie A | 38 | 23 | 9 | 6 | 77 | 38 | 78 | 4th | Champions | CL R16 | Champions | (Italy) Andrea Pirlo | (Portugal) Cristiano Ronaldo | 29 |
| 2021–22 | Serie A | 38 | 20 | 10 | 8 | 57 | 37 | 70 | 4th | Runners-up | CL R16 | Runners-up | (Italy) Massimiliano Allegri | (Argentina) Paulo Dybala | 10 |
| 2022–23 | Serie A | 38 | 22 | 6 | 10 | 56 | 33 | 62 | 7th | SF | CL GS EL SF | N/A | (Italy) Massimiliano Allegri | (Serbia) Dušan Vlahović | 10 |
| 2023–24 | Serie A | 38 | 19 | 14 | 5 | 54 | 31 | 71 | 3rd | Champions | N/A | N/A | (Italy) Massimiliano Allegri (Uruguay) Paolo Montero | (Serbia) Dušan Vlahović | 16 |
| 2024–25 | Serie A | 38 | 18 | 16 | 4 | 58 | 35 | 70 | 4th | QF | CL KPO | SF | (Italy) Thiago Motta (Croatia) Igor Tudor | (Serbia) Dušan Vlahović | 10 |
| 2025–26 | Serie A | 38 | 19 | 12 | 7 | 61 | 34 | 69 | 6th | QF | CL KPO | N/A | (Croatia) Igor Tudor (Italy) Massimo Brambilla (Italy) Luciano Spalletti | (Turkey) Kenan Yıldız | 10 |

As of 24 May 2026

- 1. For details of league structure, see Italian football league system.
- 2. The first edition was held in 1922, but the second champions were not crowned until 1936.
- 3. The first edition was held in 1988 (played in 1989).
- 4. Only league goals are counted. The Serie A Golden Boot known as capocannoniere (plural: capocannonieri) is the award given to the highest goalscorer in Serie A.
- 5. Juventus was the first team in association football history to adopt a star to their badge to represent their tenth league title in 1958. The star was later formally adopted as a symbol and increased for every ten titles. Juventus currently has three stars above their Scudetto badge since the 2015–16 season.
- 6. In 2014–15 season, Juventus won their tenth Coppa Italia title and adopted the Coppa Italia badge to the opposite side of the Scudetto badge the following season.

== Doubles and Trebles ==
- Doubles:
  - Serie A and Coppa Italia: 6
    - 1959–60; 1994–95; 2014–15; 2015–16; 2016–17 and 2017–18 seasons
  - Serie A and UEFA Cup Winners' Cup: 1
    - 1983–84 season
  - Serie A and UEFA Cup: 1
    - 1976–77 season
  - Coppa Italia and UEFA Cup: 1
    - 1989–90 season
- Trebles:
  - European Treble (UEFA Cup, European Cup Winners' Cup, European Cup): 1
    - 1976–77 UEFA Cup, 1983–84 European Cup Winners' Cup, 1984–85 European Cup
  - Italian Treble (Supercoppa Italiana, Serie A, Coppa Italia): (Note: Also called Tripletta Tricolore, Italian Football Federation (FIGC) regards the national supercup legally as a seasonal competition in its own official matches calendar, cf. "Juve, niente sfilata scudetto in pullman" (in Italian). Sport Mediaset. 10 May 2016.) 1
    - 2015–16 season

== See also ==
- List of unbeaten football club seasons

== Bibliography ==
=== Other publications ===
- "Football Philosophers" (PDF). The Technician. 46. Union des Associations Européennes de Football (UEFA). May 2010.
