= List of Juventus FC managers =

Juventus Football Club is an Italian professional association football club based in Turin, Piedmont, who currently play in the Serie A. They have played at their current home ground, Juventus Stadium, since 2011. This chronological list comprises all those who have held the position of manager of the first team of Juventus since the appointment of the club's first professional manager, Hungarian Jenő Károly, in 1923. Each manager's entry includes his dates of tenure and the club's overall competitive record (in terms of matches won, drawn and lost). Caretaker managers are included, where known, as well as those who have been in permanent charge. As of the start of the 2008–09 season, the club have had 31 full-time managers.

The most successful person to manage Juventus is Giovanni Trapattoni, who won six Football League titles (Scudetto), two Coppa Italias, one European Champions Clubs' Cup, one UEFA Cup Winners' Cup, two UEFA Cups, one UEFA Super Cup and one Intercontinental Cup in two periods from 1976 and 1986 and from 1991 to 1995. Trapattoni is also the club's longest-serving manager with thirteen seasons, ten of which consecutives.

== List of managers ==
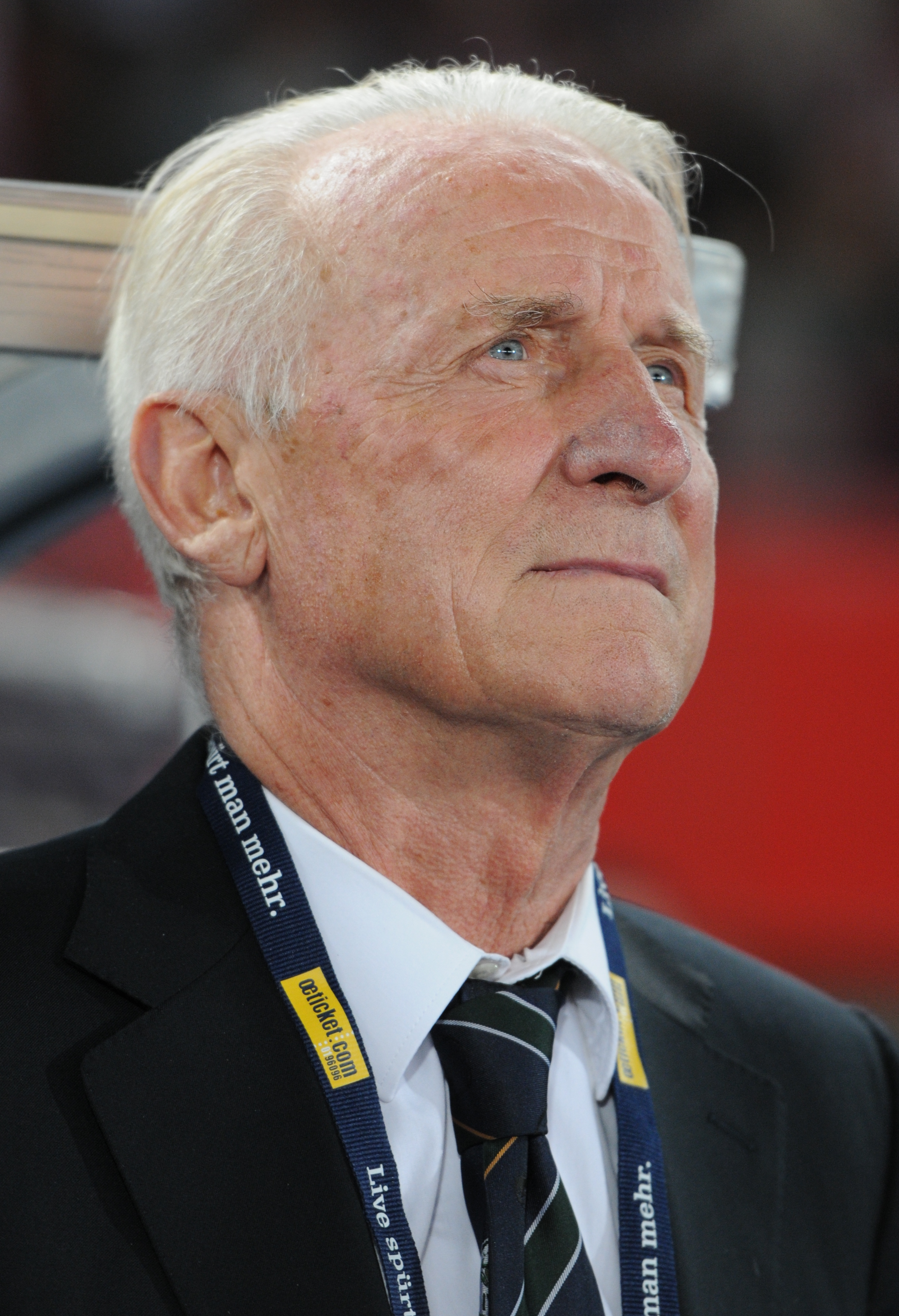
Giovanni Trapattoni is the most successful manager in the history of Juventus with fourteen trophies.

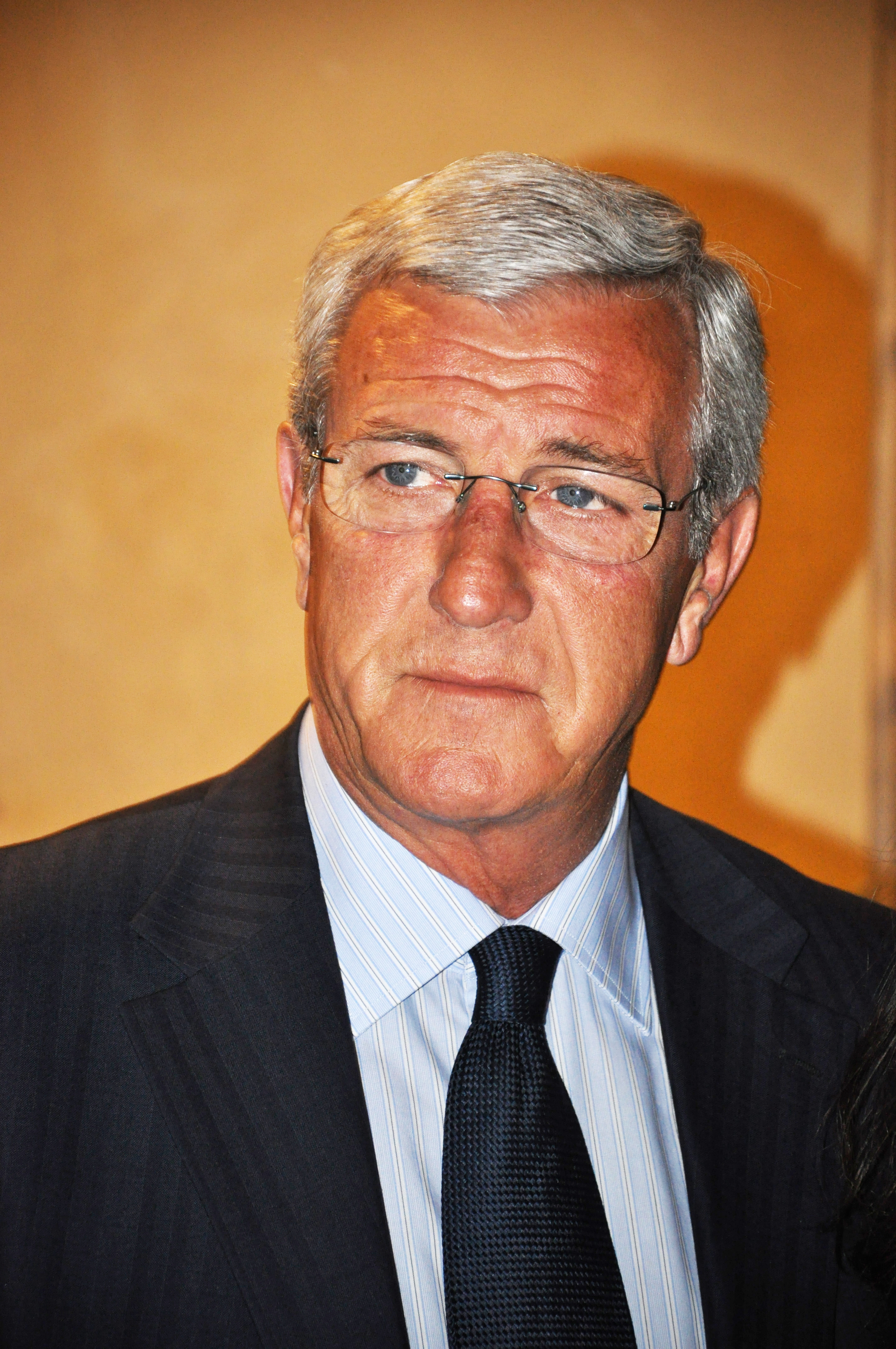
Marcello Lippi is the second-most successful manager of Juventus with thirteen trophies.

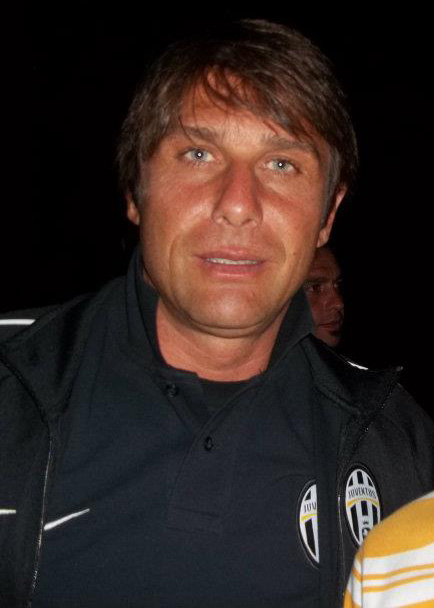
Antonio Conte won three consecutive Serie A titles with Juventus in 2012, 2013, and 2014.

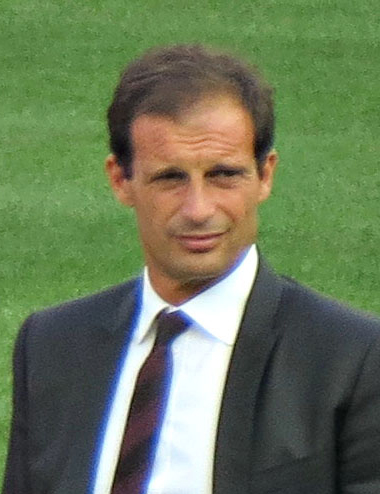
Massimiliano Allegri won four consecutive domestic doubles with Juventus between 2015 and 2018.

The following is a list of managers of Juventus from 1923 when the Agnelli family took over and the club became more structured and organized, until the present day. Includes all competitive matches. Statistics are correct as of 26 October 2025.

Name	Nat.	From	To	M	W	D	L	GF	GA	W%
Jenő Károly	(Hungary)	1923	1926	70	40	17	13	145	64	57.14
József Viola	(Hungary)	1926^{(int.)}	1928	67	38	12	17	159	66	56.72
William Aitken	(Scotland)	1928	1930	67	37	16	14	134	59	55.22
Carlo Carcano	(Italy)	1930	1935	161	111	27	23	387	165	68.94
Carlo Bigatto Iº; Benè Gola	(Italy) (Italy)	1934^{(int.)}	1935	29	16	8	5	49	28	55.17
Virginio Rosetta	(Italy)	1935	1939	139	61	45	33	217	142	43.88
Umberto Caligaris	(Italy)	1939	1940	36	19	7	10	59	47	52.78
Federico Munerati	(Italy)	1941^{(int.)}	1941	30	12	7	11	50	49	40.00
Giovanni Ferrari	(Italy)	1941	1942	17	7	4	6	27	24	41.18
Luis Monti	(Italy) (Argentina)	1942^{(int.)}	1942	19	10	5	4	37	21	52.63
Felice P. Borel IIº	(Italy)	1942	1946	96	54	21	21	225	124	56.25
Renato Cesarini	(Italy) (Argentina)	1946	1948	76	40	18	18	151	88	52.63
Billy Chalmers	(Scotland)	1948	1949	48	24	10	14	86	59	50.00
Jesse Carver	(England)	1949	1951	76	51	14	11	203	87	67.11
Luigi Bertolini	(Italy)	1951^{(int.)}	1951	10	8	1	1	32	9	80.00
György Sárosi	(Hungary)	1951	1953	62	32	16	10	139	65	51.61
Aldo Olivieri	(Italy)	1953	1955	68	32	23	13	118	87	47.06
Sandro Puppo	(Italy)	1955	1957	62	15	27	20	69	78	24.19
Teobaldo Depetrini	(Italy)	1957; 1958^{(int.)}	– 1959	36	20	9	7	87	54	55.56
Ljubiša Broćić	(Socialist Federal Republic of Yugoslavia)	1957	1958	53	34	9	10	122	80	64.15
Carlo Parola	(Italy)	1959; 1961; 1974	1961; 1962; 1976	202	117	38	47	400	219	57.92
Július Korostelev	(Czechoslovakia)	1961^{(int.)}	1961	2	0	1	1	2	3	0.00
Paulo Amaral	(Brazil)	1962	1964	44	25	10	9	72	33	56.82
Eraldo Monzeglio	(Italy)	1964^{(int.)}	1964	37	15	10	12	50	43	40.54
Heriberto Herrera	(Paraguay)	1964	1969	215	100	73	42	265	156	46.51
Luis Carniglia	(Argentina)	1969	1970	12	5	4	3	17	11	41.67
Ercole Rabitti	(Italy)	1970^{(int.)}	1970	29	14	9	6	38	18	48.28
Armando Picchi	(Italy)	1970	1971	29	17	6	6	50	24	58.62
Čestmír Vycpálek	(Czechoslovakia)	1971	1974	157	79	56	22	257	136	50.32
Giovanni Trapattoni	(Italy)	1976; 1991	1986; 1994	596	319	181	96	969	478	53.52
Rino Marchesi	(Italy)	1986	1988	89	42	27	20	133	76	47.19
Dino Zoff	(Italy)	1988	1990	104	53	34	17	168	102	50.96
Luigi Maifredi	(Italy)	1990	1991	49	23	12	14	79	50	46.94
Marcello Lippi	(Italy)	1994; 2001	1999; 2004	405	227	104	74	712	383	56.05
Carlo Ancelotti	(Italy)	1999	2001	114	63	33	18	185	101	55.26
Fabio Capello	(Italy)	2004	2006	105	68	24	13	181	81	64.76
Didier Deschamps	(France)	2006	2007	44	31	11	2	89	30	70.45
Giancarlo Corradini	(Italy)	2007^{(int.)}	2007	2	0	0	2	2	4	0.00
Claudio Ranieri	(Italy)	2007	2009	93	46	30	17	168	96	48.94
Ciro Ferrara	(Italy)	2009	2010	31	15	5	11	46	37	50.00
Alberto Zaccheroni	(Italy)	2010	2010	21	8	5	8	28	34	38.10
Luigi Delneri	(Italy)	2010	2011	50	20	19	11	72	57	40.00
Antonio Conte	(Italy)	2011	2014	151	102	34	15	280	101	67.55
Massimiliano Allegri	(Italy)	2014; 2021	2019; 2024	420	271	75	74	735	337	64.52
Maurizio Sarri	(Italy)	2019	2020	52	34	9	9	99	54	65.38
Andrea Pirlo	(Italy)	2020	2021	52	34	10	8	108	50	65.38
Thiago Motta	(Italy)	2024	2025	42	18	17	7	63	42	42.86
Igor Tudor	(Croatia)	2025	2025	24	10	8	6	39	29	41.67
Massimo Brambilla	(Italy)	2025^{(int.)}	2025	1	1	0	0	3	1	100.00
Luciano Spalletti	(Italy)	2025	-	29	15	7	7	53	27	51.72

- Notes:

M – Total number of matches played under manager

W – Matches won, D – Matches drawn, L – Matches lost, GF – Goals for, GA – Goals against
W% – Percentage of matches won

- Legend:

^{(int.)} Interim manager

Nationality is indicated by the corresponding FIFA country code(s).

=== Trophies ===
Rank	Manager	SA	CI	SCI	UCL	CWC	UEL	USC	UIC	IC	Total
1	(Italy) Giovanni Trapattoni	6	2	–	1	1	2	1	–	1	14
2	(Italy) Marcello Lippi	5	1	4	1	–	–	1	–	1	13
3	(Italy) Massimiliano Allegri	5	5	2	–	–	–	–	–	–	12
4	(Italy) Antonio Conte	3	–	2	–	–	–	–	–	–	5
5	(Italy) Carlo Carcano	4	–	–	–	–	–	–	–	–	4
6	(Italy) (Argentina) Renato Cesarini	2	1	–	–	–	–	–	–	–	3
7	(Paraguay) Heriberto Herrera	1	1	–	–	–	–	–	–	–	2
7	(Czechoslovakia) Čestmír Vycpálek	2	–	–	–	–	–	–	–	–	2
7	(Italy) Dino Zoff	–	1	–	–	–	1	–	–	–	2
7	(Italy) Andrea Pirlo	–	1	1	–	–	–	–	–	–	2
11	(Italy) Carlo Parola	1	–	–	–	–	–	–	–	–	1
11	(Hungary) Jenő Károly	1	–	–	–	–	–	–	–	–	1
11	(Italy) Carlo Bigatto	1	–	–	–	–	–	–	–	–	1
11	(England) Jesse Carver	1	–	–	–	–	–	–	–	–	1
11	(Hungary) György Sárosi	1	–	–	–	–	–	–	–	–	1
11	(Socialist Federal Republic of Yugoslavia) Ljubiša Broćić	1	–	–	–	–	–	–	–	–	1
11	(Italy) Maurizio Sarri	1	–	–	–	–	–	–	–	–	1
11	(Italy) Virginio Rosetta	–	1	–	–	–	–	–	–	–	1
11	(Italy) Teobaldo Depetrini	–	1	–	–	–	–	–	–	–	1
11	(Italy) Giovanni Ferrari	–	1	–	–	–	–	–	–	–	1
11	(Italy) Carlo Ancelotti	–	–	–	–	–	–	–	1	–	1

Manager in bold denotes the previous manager.
