= List of AC Milan honours =

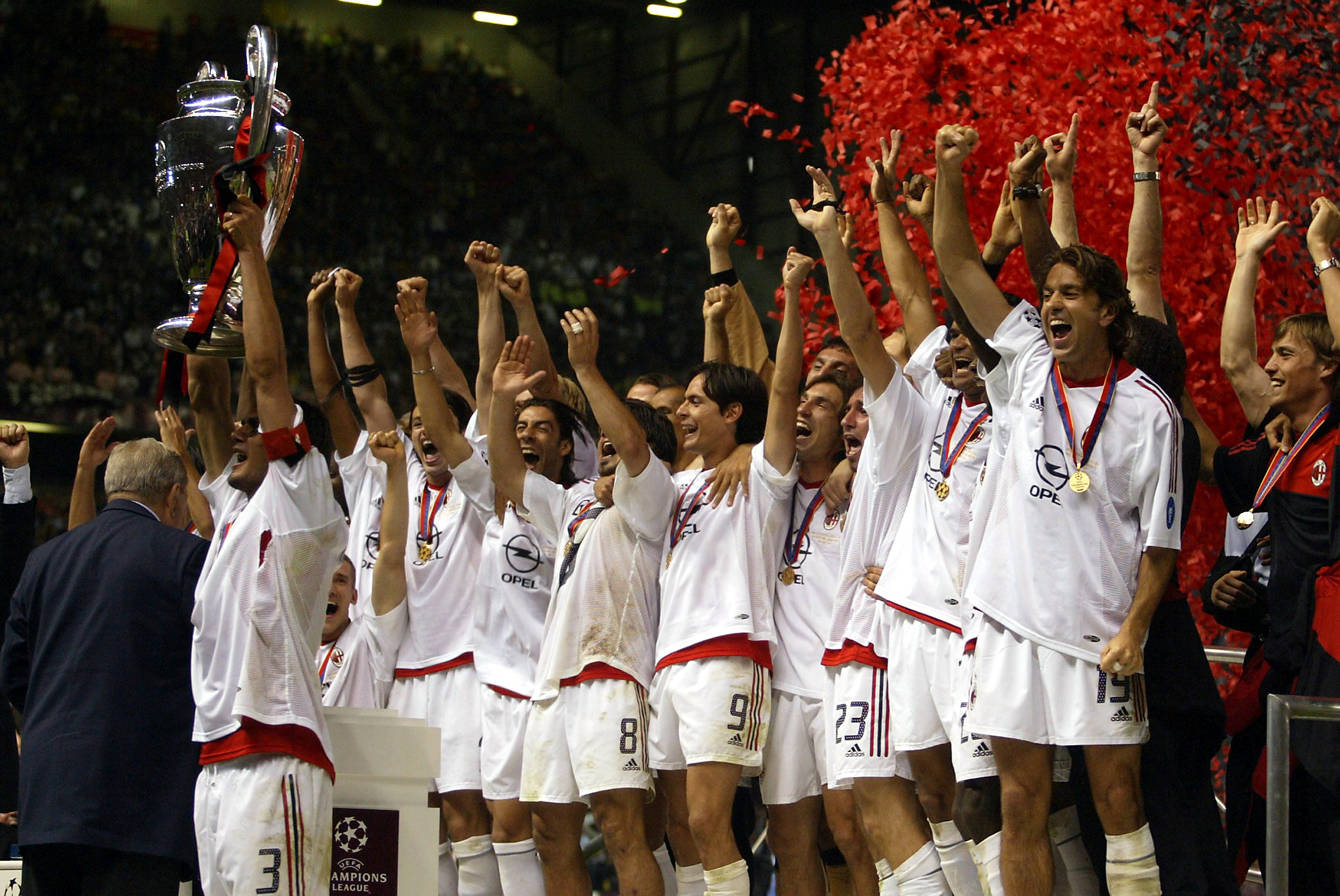
Paolo Maldini lifting the sixth Champions League won by Milan in 2003

This is a list of AC Milan honours. AC Milan is an Italian football club. This article contains historical and current trophies pertaining to the club.

== National titles (37) ==
- Italian Football Championship / Serie A (first division):

- Winners (19): 1901, 1906, 1907, 1950–51, 1954–55, 1956–57, 1958–59, 1961–62, 1967–68, 1978–79, 1987–88, 1991–92, 1992–93, 1993–94, 1995–96, 1998–99, 2003–04, 2010–11, 2021–22
- Runners-up (17): 1902, 1947–48, 1949–50, 1951–52, 1955–56, 1960–61, 1964–65, 1968–69, 1970–71, 1971–72, 1972–73, 1989–90, 1990–91, 2004–05, 2011–12, 2020–21, 2023–24

- Serie B (second division):

- Winners (2): 1980–81, 1982–83

- Coppa Italia:

- Winners (5): 1966–67, 1971–72, 1972–73, 1976–77, 2002–03
- Runners-up (10): 1941–42, 1967–68, 1970–71, 1974–75, 1984–85, 1989–90, 1997–98, 2015–16, 2017–18, 2024–25

- Supercoppa Italiana:

- Winners (8): 1988, 1992, 1993, 1994, 2004, 2011, 2016, 2024
- Runners-up (5): 1996, 1999, 2003, 2018, 2022

- Medaglia del Re: 3

Winners (3): 1900, 1901, 1902

== European titles (17) ==
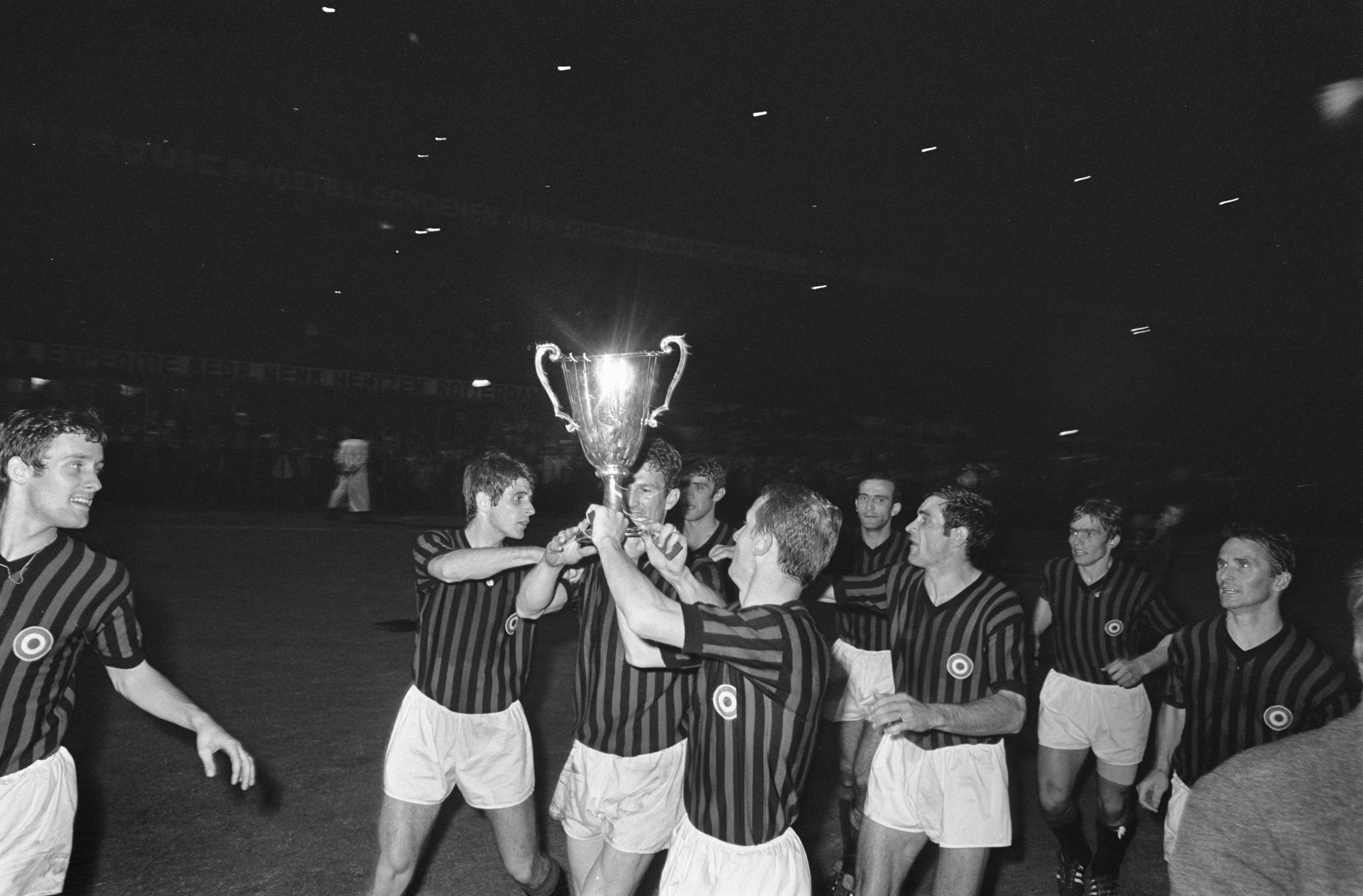
Milan players celebrating their first Cup Winners' Cup in 1968

- European Cup/UEFA Champions League:

- Winners (7): 1962–63, 1968–69, 1988–89, 1989–90, 1993–94, 2002–03, 2006–07
- Runners-up (4): 1957–58, 1992–93, 1994–95, 2004–05

- European Cup Winners' Cup:

- Winners (2): 1967–68, 1972–73
- Runners-up (1): 1973–74

- European Super Cup/UEFA Super Cup:

- Winners (5): 1989, 1990, 1994, 2003, 2007
- Runners-up (2): 1973, 1993

- Latin Cup:

- Winners (2): 1951, 1956
- Runners-up (1): 1953

- Mitropa Cup:

- Winners (1): 1982

== Worldwide titles (4) ==
- Intercontinental Cup:

- Winners (3): 1969, 1989, 1990
- Runners-up (4): 1963, 1993, 1994, 2003

- FIFA Club World Cup:

- Winners (1): 2007

== Unofficial competitions ==
=== Domestic ===
- Torneo FGNI: 5 (record)

1902, 1904; 1905; 1906; 1907

- Coppa Federale: 1 (record)

1915-1916

- Trofeo Albero di Natale: 1

1900

- Coppa Novara: 1

1903

- Coppa Reyer San Marco di Venezia: 2

1903; 1905

- Coppa Lombardia: 1

1904

- Torneo di Alessandria: 1

1904

- Palla Dapples: 23

From 1905 to 1908

- Coppa Spensley: 2

1905-1906, 1906-1907

- Medaglia Esposizione Internazionale di Milano: 1

1906

- Medaglia d'oro Ausonia: 1

1906-1907

- Coppa Solcio: 3

1909-1910, 1910-1911, 1911-1912

- Torneo di Brescia: 1

1909-1910

- Coppa Mantova: 1

1909-1910

- Challenge Pro Vicenza: 1

1910-1911

- Scarpa d'argento Gerolamo Radice: 3

1911-1912, 1914-1915, 1921-1922

- Coppa Lario: 2

1912-1913, 1913-1914

- Medaglia Comitato Pro Aviazione Nazionale: 1

1912-1913

- Coppa Marx: 1

1914-1915

- Torneo di Milano: 1

1914-1915

- Coppa Natale: 1

1914-1915

- Coppa Gazzetta dello Sport: 1

1915-1916

- Coppa Val d'Olona: 1

1916-1917

- Coppa Boneschi: 1

1916-1917

- Coppa Unione e Progresso Monza: 1

1916-1917

- Coppa Regionale Lombarda: 1

1916-1917

- Coppa Mauro: 1

1917-1918

- Coppa Giurati: 1

1918-1919

- Trofeo Lombardi e Macchi: 1

1924-1925

- Torneo del Littorio: 1

1926-1927

- Coppa Casinò di Sanremo: 1

1934-1935

- Coppa Angelo Monti: 1

1944-1945

- Coppa Disciplina: 4

1949-1950, 1950-1951, 1954-1955, 1956-1957

- Torneo Città di Milano: 2

1963; 1978

- Coppa Luigi Carraro: 1

1967-1968

- Coppa Giuseppe Meazza: 1

1987-1988

- Memorial Armando Picchi: 1

1989

- Summer Tournament Padova: 1

1992

- Trofeo Luigi Berlusconi: 13

1992; 1993; 1994; 1996; 1997; 2002; 2005; 2006; 2007; 2008; 2009; 2011; 2014

- Coppa del Mediterraneo: 2

1992; 1994

- Memorial Giorgio Ghezzi: 2

1993; 1994

- Memorial Trabattoni: 1

2000-2001

- TIM Trophy: 5

2001; 2006; 2008; 2014; 2015

- Trofeo Seat Pagine Gialle: 1

2005

- Trofeo città di Chiasso: 1

2013-2014

- Trofeo San Nicola: 1

2015

- Trofeo Silvio Berlusconi: 1

2023

=== International ===
- Coppa dell'Amicizia: 3

1959; 1960; 1961

- Coppa Chiasso: 3

1906; 1907; 1908

- Coppa Lugano: 2

1907-1908, 1908-1909

- Coppa Camille Blanc: 1

1920-1921

- Coupe de La Vie: 1

1932

- Coppa città di Nizza: 2

1932-1933, 1933-1934

- Torneo di Caracas: 1

1964-1965

- Coppa città di Toronto: 1

1968-1969

- Torneo città di New York: 1

1968-1969

- Trofeo Villa de Madrid: 3

1973; 1977; 1991

- Mundialito de Clubs: 1

1987

- Trofeo Santiago Bernabéu: 2

1988; 1990

- Torneo città di Zurigo: 1

1991-1992

- Torneo di Capodanno Amaro Lucano: 1

1991-1992

- Columbus Cup Tournament: 1

1991-1992

- CSIL Champions Cup: 1

1991-1992

- Coppa del Mediterraneo: 2

1992-1993, 1994-1995

- Torneo Nereo Rocco: 1

1992-1993

- Trofeo Ciudad de Oviedo: 1

1993

- Torneo Ciudad de la Coruna: 1

1992-1993

- Trofeo Città di Barcellona: 1

1994

- CBC Cup: 1

1993-1994

- Shenyang Cup: 1

1993-1994

- Tokyo Cup: 1

1993-1994

- Pengyei Cup: 1

1994-1995

- Coppa del Drago: 1

1994-1995

- Opel Cup: 1

1994-1995

- Trofeo di Navarra: 1

1996-1997

- Opel Master Cup: 3

1997; January 1999; August 1999

- Trofeo Juan Acuna: 1

1998

- Trofeo San Benedetto del Tronto: 1

1998

- Qatar Airway Trophy: 1

2002

- Champions World Series: 1

2004

- Dubai Challenge Cup: 4

2009; 2011; 2012; 2014

- Taçi Oil Cup: 1

2009

- Telekom Cup: 1

2022

== Awards ==
- Gazzetta Sports Award as best Italian sports team of the year: 1979, 1989, 2007, 2022
- Gazzetta Sports Award as best worldwide sports team of the year: 1989
- Serie A Football Club of the Year: 2022
- IFFHS The World's Club Team of the Year: 1995, 2003
- World Soccer Men's World Team of the Year: 1989, 1994, 2003
- France Football European Team of the Year: 1989, 1990

== Rankings ==
- European Cup / UEFA Champions League all-time club rankings (since 1955): 8th place
- UEFA coefficient top-ranked club by 5-year period (since 1975–1979): 2 times (2002–2006 and 2003–2007)
- Second-most successful Italian club by number of trophies won: 50
- FIFA Club of the Century: 9th place
- Fourth place in the IFFHS list of the best European clubs of the 20th century.
- Fifth place in the IFFHS All-time club world ranking.
- Third place in the list of Top clubs of the 20th century by Kicker sports magazine.
- Fourth place in the top 100 clubs in the history of European competitions by L'Equipe French magazine.
- Fourth place in the top 40 clubs in the history of European competitions by the BBC.
