= List of Juventus FC honours =

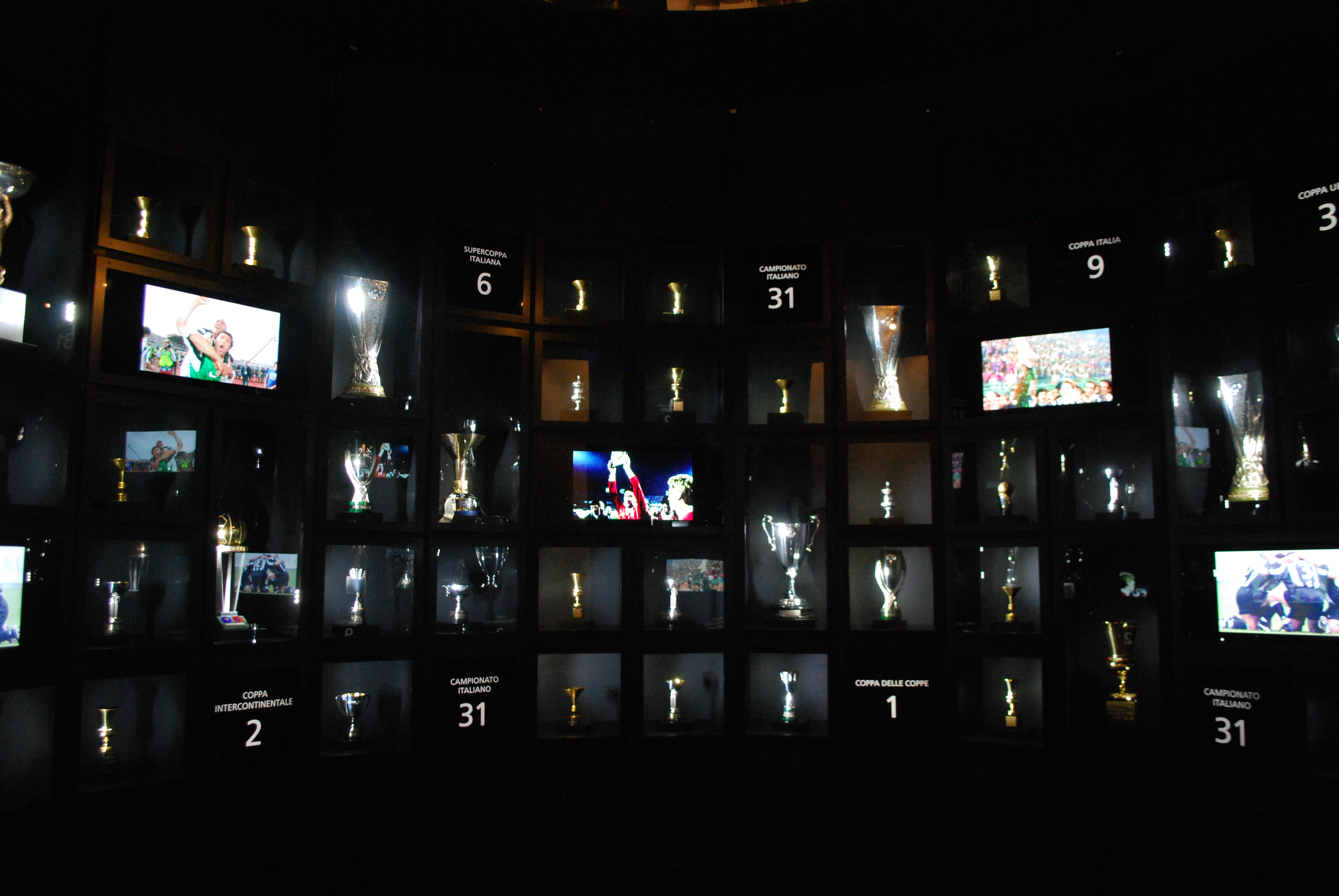
A view of J-Museum's Trophy Room (2013)

This is a list of Juventus FC honours. Juventus FC is an Italian football club. This article contains historical and current trophies pertaining to the club. For honours by season, see List of Juventus FC seasons.

== National titles (61) ==
- Serie A
  - Winners (36): 1905, 1925–26, (Note: Up until 1921, the top division of Italian football was the Federal Football Championship, but since then it has been the First Division, the National Division and the Serie A.) 1930–31, 1931–32, 1932–33, 1933–34, 1934–35, 1949–50, 1951–52, 1957–58, 1959–60, 1960–61, 1966–67, 1971–72, 1972–73, 1974–75, 1976–77, 1977–78, 1980–81, 1981–82, 1983–84, 1985–86, 1994–95, 1996–97, 1997–98, 2001–02, 2002–03, 2004–05, (Note: This title was revoked through the courts following the Calciopoli Scandal; it is not counted in the overall total.) 2005–06, (Note: This title was put sub judice, then assigned to Internazionale, through the courts following the Calciopoli Scandal; it is not counted in the overall total.) 2011–12, 2012–13, 2013–14, 2014–15, 2015–16, 2016–17, 2017–18, 2018–19, 2019–20
  - Runners-up (21): 1903, 1904, 1906, 1937–38, 1945–46, 1946–47, 1947–48, 1952–53, 1953–54, 1962–63, 1973–74, 1975–76, 1979–80, 1982–83, 1986–87, 1991–92, 1993–94, 1995–96, 1999–2000, 2000–01, 2008–09
- Coppa Italia
  - Winners (15): 1937–38, 1941–42, 1958–59, 1959–60, 1964–65, 1978–79, 1982–83, 1989–90, 1994–95, 2014–15, 2015–16, 2016–17, 2017–18, 2020–21, 2023–24
  - Runners-up (7): 1972–73, 1991–92, 2001–02, 2003–04, 2011–12, 2019–20, 2021–22
- Supercoppa Italiana
  - Winners (9): 1995, 1997, 2002, 2003, 2012, 2013, 2015, 2018, 2020
  - Runners-up (8): 1990, 1998, 2005, 2014, 2016, 2017, 2019, 2021
- Serie B
  - Winners (1): 2006–07

== European titles (9) ==
- European Champions' Cup/UEFA Champions League: 2
  - Winners: 1984–85, 1995–96
    - Runners-up: 1972–73, 1982–83, 1996–97, 1997–98, 2002–03, 2014–15, 2016–17
- UEFA Cup Winners' Cup: 1
  - Winners: 1983–84
- UEFA Europa League: 3
  - Winners: 1976–77, 1989–90, 1992–93
    - Runners-up: 1994–95
- UEFA Super Cup: 2
  - Winners: 1984, 1996
- UEFA Intertoto Cup: 1
  - Winners: 1999
- Inter-Cities Fairs Cup:
    - Runners-up: 1964–65, 1970–71

== Worldwide titles (2) ==
- Intercontinental Cup: 2
  - Winners: 1985, 1996
  - Runners-up: 1973
- Copa Rio (international tournament)
  - Runners-up: 1951

== Friendly competitions (51) ==
- National Department of Public Education Cup: (3)
  - 1900, 1901, 1902
- Government of City of Torino's Gold Medal: (1)
  - 1901
- City of Torino's Cup: (2)
  - 1902, 1903
- Trino Vercellese's Tournament: (1)
  - 1903
- International University Cup: (1)
  - 1904
- Luigi Bozino Cup: (2)
  - 1905, 1906
- Luserna San Giovanni Cup: (1)
  - 1907
- Federal Championship of Prima Categoria (James R. Spensley's Cup) (1):
  - 1908
- Palla d'Argento Henry Dapples: (2)
  - both won in 1908
- Italian Championship of Prima Categoria (R. Buni's Cup) (1):
  - 1909
- Biella Cup: (1)
  - 1909
- FIAT Tournament: (1)
  - 1945
- Pio Marchi Cup: (1)
  - 1945
- Cup of the Alps: (1)
  - 1963
- Italian-Spanish Friendship's Cup: (1)
  - 1965
- Coppa Super Clubs: (1)
  - 1983
- Luigi Berlusconi Trophy: (11)
  - 1991, 1995, 1998, 1999, 2000, 2001, 2003, 2004, 2010, 2012, 2021
- Pier Cesare Baretti Memorial: (2)
  - 1992, 1993
- Sivori Cup: (1)
  - 1994
- Birra Moretti Trophy: (6)
  - 1997, 2000, 2003, 2004, 2006, 2008
- Republic of San Marino Trophy: (3)
  - 1998, 2001, 2002
- Trofeo Valle d'Aosta: (3)
  - 2001, 2002, 2003
- Joan Gamper Trophy: (1)
  - 2005
- TIM Trophy: (1)
  - 2009
- International Champions Cup: (1)
  - Australia 2016
- MLS All-Star Game: (1)
  - 2018
