= 1931–32 FBC Juventus season =

Italian football club season

Foot-Ball Club Juventus
1931–32 season
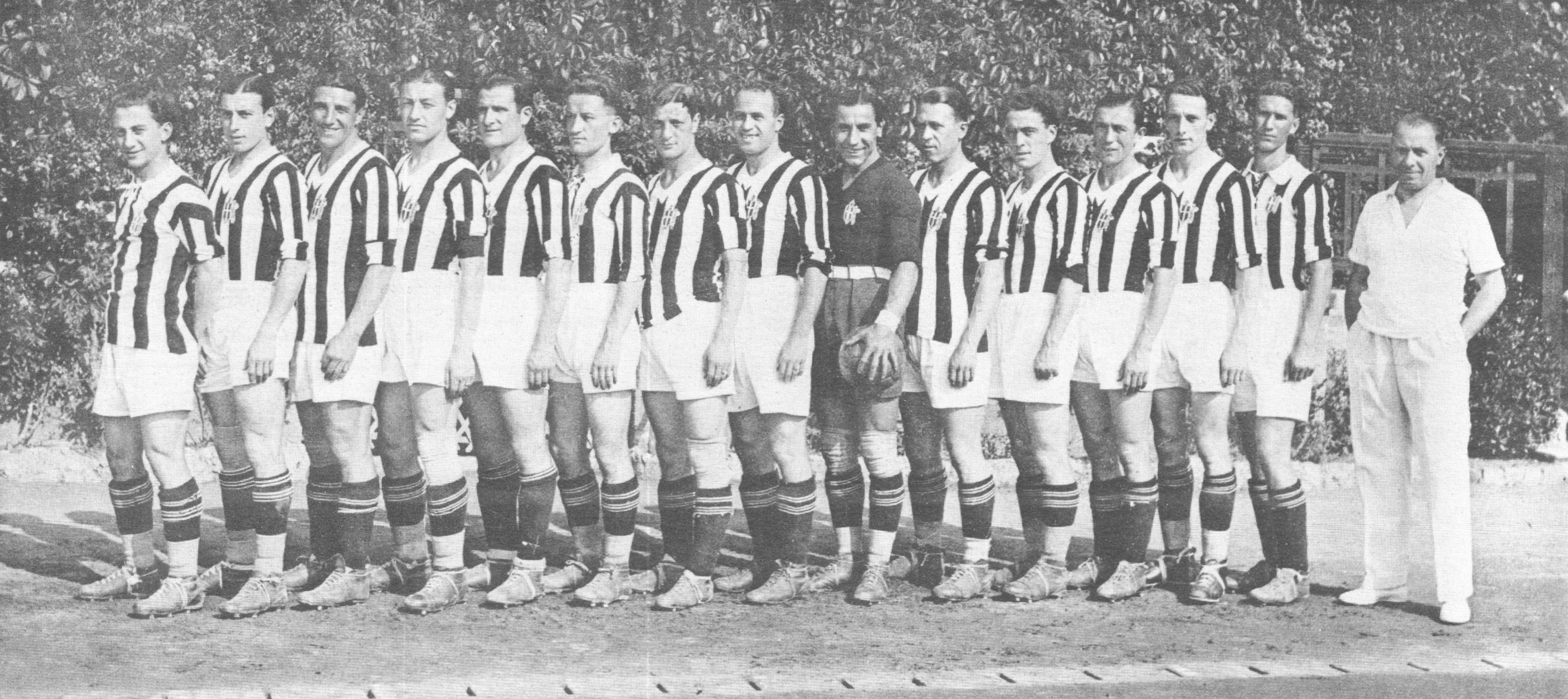
- President: Edoardo Agnelli
- Manager: Carlo Carcano
- Stadium: Stadio Benito Mussolini
- Serie A: 1st (in Mitropa Cup)
- Mitropa Cup: Semifinals
- Top goalscorer: League: Raimundo Orsi (20); All: Orsi (23)
Home colours

During the 1931–32 season Foot-Ball Club Juventus competed in Serie A and Mitropa Cup.

== Summary ==
The club transferred new players in to the roster such as Enzo Rosa and Brazilian Pietro Sernagiotto (who had an agreement with Genoa). Juventus clinched its second title in a row with 54 points one more from the previous campaign surpassing runner-up Bologna thanks to a powerful offense scoring 89 goals (65 in away) and conceded only 38.

Also Raimundo Orsi with 20 goals (included 5 penalties) became 5th best topscorer of the league.

== Squad ==
Note: Flags indicate national team as defined under FIFA eligibility rules; some limited exceptions apply. Players may hold more than one non-FIFA nationality.

Pos.	Nation	Player
GK	ITA	Gianpiero Combi
DF	ITA	Umberto Caligaris
DF	ITA	Mario Ferrero
DF	ITA	Virginio Rosetta (Captain)
DF	ITA	Giovanni Varglien II
DF	ITA	Luigi Bertolini
MF	ARG	Luis Monti
MF	ITA	Mario Varglien I

Pos.	Nation	Player
MF	ARG	Renato Cesarini
MF	ITA	Giovanni Ferrari
FW	ARG	Juan José Maglio
FW	ITA	Federico Munerati
FW	ARG	Raimundo Orsi
FW	ITA	Enzo Rosa
FW	BRA	Pietro Sernagiotto
FW	ITA	Giovanni Vecchina

== Competitions ==
=== Serie A ===
==== League table ====
Pos	Team	Pld	W	D	L	GF	GA	GD	Pts	Qualification or relegation
1	Juventus (C)	34	24	6	4	89	38	+51	54	1932 Mitropa Cup
2	Bologna	34	21	8	5	85	33	+52	50	1932 Mitropa Cup
3	Roma	34	16	8	10	53	42	+11	40	
4	Fiorentina	34	16	7	11	54	35	+19	39	
4	Milan	34	15	9	10	57	40	+17	39	

Source: Panini
(C) Champions

==== Matches ====
20 September 1931 1	Pro Patria	1–1	Juventus	Busto Arsizio
15:30	Cazzaniga 75'	Report	40' Monti	Stadium: Stadio Comunale; Referee: Bertoli

27 September 1931 2	Juventus	5–3	Napoli	Turin
	Ferrari 3', 24'; Vecchina 39'; Orsi 55', 68'	Report	15' Buscaglia; 58' Vojak I 80' Vojak	Stadium: Campo di Corso Marsiglia; Referee: Felice Rovida

4 October 1931 3	Casale	1–1	Juventus	Casale Monferrato
	Migliavacca 15'	Report	52' Varglien I	Stadium: Stadio Natale Palli; Referee: Lenti

11 October 1931 4	Juventus	2–0	Milan	Turin
15:00	Orsi 5'; Ferrari 54'	Report		Stadium: Campo di Corso Marsiglia; Referee: Melandri

18 October 1931 5	Roma	2–0	Juventus	Rome
	Bernardini 13', 85'	Report		Stadium: Campo Testaccio

25 October 1931 6	Juventus	2–1	Genoa	Turin
15:00	Munerati 52', 56'	Report	83' Levratto	Stadium: Campo di Corso Marsiglia; Referee: Caironi

1 November 1931 7	Juventus	3–0	Alessandria	Turin
15:00 hs	Ferrari 65'; Maglio 81'; Cesarini 90'	Report		Stadium: Campo di Corso Marsiglia; Referee: Barlassina

8 November 1931 8	Bari	0–1	Juventus	Bari
14:30 hs		Report	85' Munerati	Stadium: Campo degli Sport

22 November 1931 9	Triestina	0–1	Juventus	Trieste
		Report	40' Orsi	Stadium: Stadio Montebello; Referee: Caironi

29 November 1931 10	Juventus	4–1	Pro Vercelli	Turin
	Maglio 13', 72'; Ferrari 25'; Munerati 86'	Report	76' Ferraris	Stadium: Campo di Corso Marsiglia; Referee: Guarneri

6 December 1931 11	Bologna	1–1	Juventus	Bologna
14:30	Reguzzoni 23'	Report	56' Bertolini	Stadium: Stadio Littoriale; Referee: Lenti

20 December 1931 12	Torino	0–0	Juventus	Turin
		Report		Stadium: Stadio Filadelfia; Referee: Carraro

27 December 1931 13	Juventus	1–2	Lazio	Turin
	Orsi 33' (pen.)	Report	6' Fantoni; 7' Spivach	Stadium: Campo di Corso Marsiglia; Referee: Dani

3 January 1932 14	Juventus	3–0	Modena	Turin
	Orsi 18', 34', 71'	Report		Stadium: Campo di Corso Marsiglia; Referee: Barlassina

10 January 1932 15	Brescia	0–4	Juventus	Brescia
		Report	25' Ferrari; 51' Orsi; 53' Vecchina; 81' Munerati	Stadium: Stadio Comunale; Referee: Lenti

17 January 1932 16	Juventus	6–2	Ambrosiana-Inter	Turin
	Maglio 16', 60'; Ferrari 17'; Munerati 76'; Orsi 82'; Vecchina 89'	Report	34' Scarone; 53' Demaria	Stadium: Campo di Corso Marsiglia; Referee: Dani

24 January 1932 17	Fiorentina	1–2	Juventus	Florence
	Prendato 87'	Report	12' 88' Munerati	Stadium: Stadio Giovanni Berta; Referee: Guarnieri

31 January 1932 18	Juventus	7–2	Pro Patria	Turin
	Vecchina 29', 31', 85'; Munerati 36'; Orsi 64', 90'; Varglien I 68'	Report	35', 78' (pen.) Cazzaniga	Stadium: Campo di Corso Marsiglia; Referee: Biancone

7 February 1932 19	Napoli	2–0	Juventus	Naples
	Sallustro 60', 90'	Report		Stadium: Stadio Giorgio Ascarelli; Referee: Melandri

21 February 1932 20	Juventus	3–2	Casale	Turin
	Rosa 57'; Varglien I 82'; Ferrari 87'	Report	1' De Marchi; 36' Celoria	Stadium: Campo di Corso Marsiglia; Referee: Ciamberlini

28 February 1932 21	Milan	0–0	Juventus	Milan
		Report		Stadium: Stadio San Siro; Referee: Lenti

6 March 1932 22	Juventus	7–1	Roma	Turin
15:00	Ferrari 9', 14'; Orsi 11', 52'; Cesarini 15'; Vecchina 59', 76'	Report	40' Bernardini	Stadium: Campo di Corso Marsiglia; Referee: Carraro

13 March 1932 23	Genoa	2–0	Juventus	Genoa
15:00	Mazzoni 50'; Casanova 87'	Report		Stadium: Stadio Marassi

28 March 1932 24	Alessandria	2–3	Juventus	Alessandria
	Cattaneo 9', 17'	Report	15', 27' Munerati; 75' Vecchina	Stadium: Stadio del Littorio; Referee: Caironi

3 April 1932 25	Juventus	7–3	Bari	Turin
	Orsi 14'; Bertolini 50'; Munerati 60', 62'; Vecchina 69', 85'; Monti 80'	Report	26', 75' Bisigato; 84' Rossini	Stadium: Campo di Corso Marsiglia; Referee: Gonani

17 April 1932 26	Juventus	4–2	Triestina	Turin
	Cesarini 9', 78'; Ferrari 30'; Varglien I 64'	Report	8' Brossi; 16' De Manzano	Stadium: Campo di Corso Marsiglia; Referee: Scotto

24 April 1932 27	Pro Vercelli	1–2	Juventus	Vercelli
15:30 hs	Piola 76'	Report	7' Vecchina; 65' Ferrari	Stadium: Stadio Foro Boario; Referee: Caironi

1 May 1932 28	Juventus	3–2	Bologna	Turin
	Orsi 14' (pen.); Vecchina 54', 78'	Report	6' Maini; 41' Schiavio	Stadium: Campo di Corso Marsiglia

15 May 1932 29	Juventus	3–0	Torino	Turin
15:30 hs	Ferrari 16'; Munerati 23'; Cesarini 56'	Report		Stadium: Campo di Corso Marsiglia; Referee: Barlassina

22 May 1932 30	Lazio	0–3	Juventus	Rome
15:30 hs		Report	29', 83' Cesarini; 49' Munerati	Stadium: Stadio Rondinellla; Referee: Albino Carraro

26 May 1932 31	Modena	0–1	Juventus	Modena
15:30 hs		Report	24' (pen.) Orsi	Stadium: Stadio di via Fontanelli; Referee: Giorgi

29 May 1932 32	Juventus	3–0	Brescia	Turin
	Vecchina 42'; Ferrari 68'; Orsi 86' (pen.)	Report		Stadium: Campo di Corso Marsiglia; Referee: Ciamberlini

5 June 1932 33	Ambrosiana-Inter	2–4	Juventus	Milan
15:30 hs	Meazza 4'; Mariani 90'	Report	15' Monti; 57', 83' Ferrari; 85' Orsi	Stadium: Stadio San Siro; Referee: Albino Carraro

12 June 1932 34	Juventus	2–2	Fiorentina	Turin
	Orsi 21' (pen.); Varglien II 54'	Report	3' Petrone; 23' Galluzzi	Stadium: Campo di Corso Marsiglia; Referee: Quilleri

=== Mitropa Cup ===
==== Quarterfinals ====
29 June 1932	Juventus	4–0	(Hungary) Ferencváros	Turin
	Orsi 14'; Cesarini 44', 55'; Sernagiotto 59'			Stadium: Stadio Benito Mussolini; Referee: (Czechoslovakia) Cejnar

3 July 1932	(Hungary) Ferencváros	3–3	Juventus	Budapest
18:00	Sárosi 15' (pen.), 18' (pen.), 84' (pen.)		25' Orsi; 30', 65' Cesarini	Stadium: Üllői-úti Pálya; Referee: (Austria) Braun

==== Semifinals ====
6 July 1932	(Czechoslovakia) Slavia Prague	4–0	Juventus	Prague
18:30	Kopecký 24'; Svoboda 29', 36'; Fiala 90+1' (pen.)			Referee: (Austria) Braun

10 July 1932	Juventus	2–0	(Czechoslovakia) Slavia Prague	Turin
	Cesarini 15'; Orsi 41' (pen.)			Stadium: Stadio di Corso Marsiglia; Referee: (Austria) Miesz

== Statistics ==
=== Goalscorers ===
23 goals

- (Italy) (Argentina) Raimundo Orsi

16 goals

- (Italy) Giovanni Ferrari

15 goals

- (Italy) Giovanni Vecchina

14 goals

- (Italy) Federico Munerati

12 goals

- (Italy) (Argentina) Renato Cesarini

5 goals

- (Argentina) José Maglio

4 goals

- (Italy) Mario Varglien

3 goals

- (Italy) (Argentina) Luis Monti

2 goals

- (Italy) Luigi Bertolini

1 goal

- (Italy) Enzo Rosa
- (Italy) (Brazil) Pietro Sernagiotto
- (Italy) Giovanni Varglien
