= Enzo Rosa =

Italian footballer (1913-1994)

Personal information
- Date of birth: April 24, 1913
- Place of birth: Balzola, Italy
- Date of death: February 20, 1994 (aged 80)
- Place of death: Varazze, Italy
- Position: Striker

Senior career*
Years	Team	Apps	(Gls)
1931–1932	Juventus	3	(1)
1932–1934	Juventus (B team)		
1934–1935	Pavia	8	(1)
1935–1936	Atalanta	6	(2)
1936–1937	Biellese	15	(7)
1937–1938	Casale	5	(0)
1938–1940	Piacenza	0	(0)
1940–1941	Pinerolo	1	(0)
1941–1942	Casale	1	(0)
- * Club domestic league appearances and goals

Enzo Rosa (Balzola, April 24, 1913 – Varazze, February 20, 1994) was an Italian professional football player.

== Honours ==
- Serie A champion: 1931/32
