= Luciano Spalletti =

Italian football manager (born 1959)

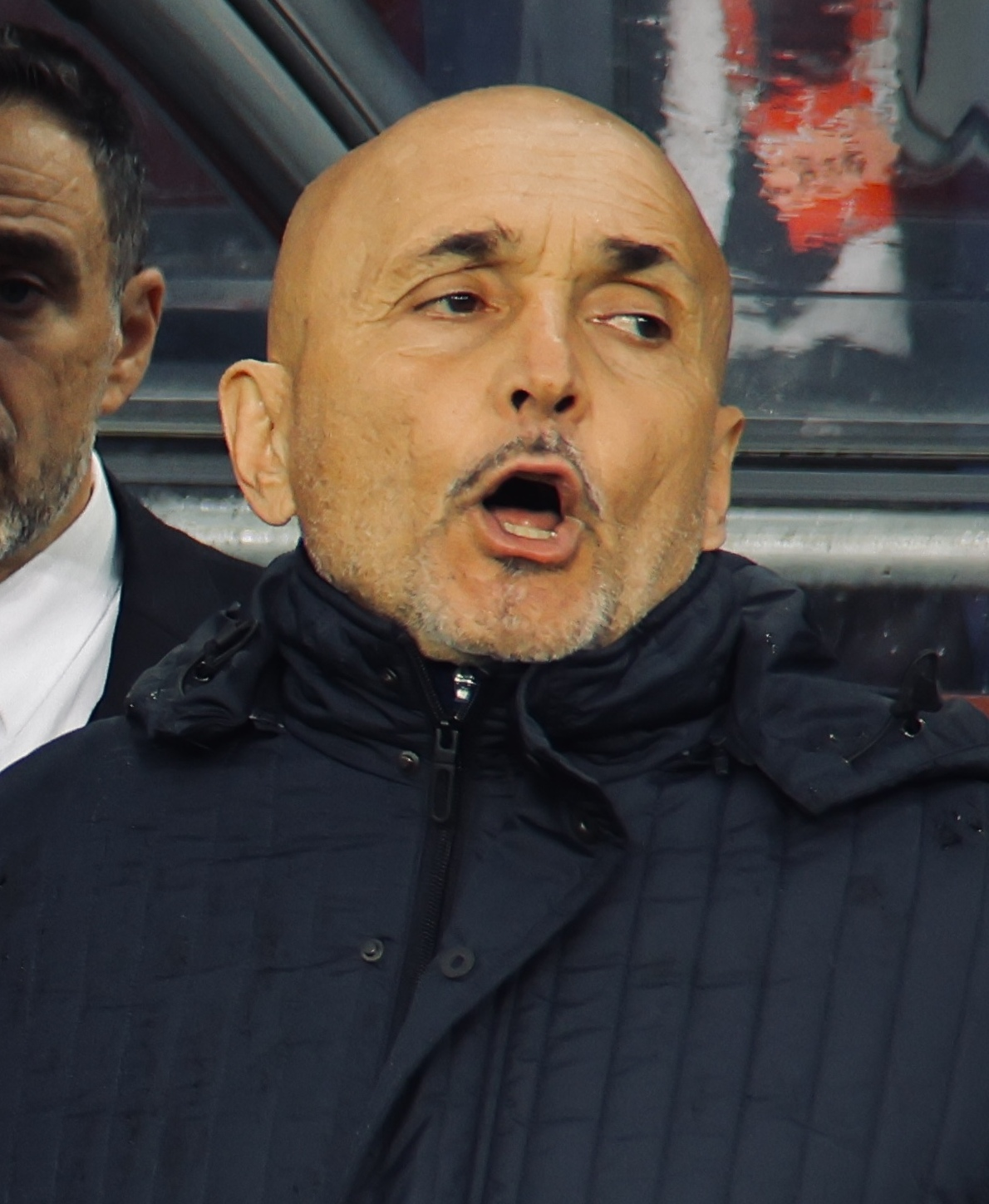
- Spalletti in 2025

Personal information
- Full name: Luciano Spalletti
- Date of birth: 7 March 1959 (age 67)
- Place of birth: Certaldo, Italy
- Height: 1.80 m (5 ft 11 in)
- Position: Midfielder

Team information
- Current team: Juventus (head coach)

Senior career*
Years	Team	Apps	(Gls)
1982–1985	Castelfiorentino	50	(0)
1985–1986	Entella	27	(2)
1986–1990	Spezia	120	(7)
1990–1991	Viareggio	29	(1)
1991–1993	Empoli	60	(3)
Total		236	(13)

Managerial career
- 1993–1994: Empoli
- 1995–1998: Empoli
- 1998: Sampdoria
- 1999: Sampdoria
- 1999: Venezia
- 1999–2000: Venezia
- 2001: Udinese
- 2001–2002: Ancona
- 2002–2005: Udinese
- 2005–2009: Roma
- 2009–2014: Zenit Saint Petersburg
- 2016–2017: Roma
- 2017–2019: Inter Milan
- 2021–2023: Napoli
- 2023–2025: Italy
- 2025–: Juventus
- * Club domestic league appearances and goals

Luciano Spalletti (Italian pronunciation: [luˈtʃaːno spalˈletti]; born 7 March 1959) is an Italian professional football coach and former player who is the head coach of Serie A club Juventus.

Spalletti started his managerial career with Empoli in 1993 before coaching clubs in Italy, including two spells with Roma, where he won two consecutive Coppa Italia titles. Spalletti managed Zenit St. Petersburg from 2009 to 2014, winning two Russian Premier League titles. Following two seasons in charge at Inter Milan, Spalletti was appointed manager of Napoli in 2021, where he won the Serie A in the 2022–23 season before leaving the club in June 2023. In August 2023, he was appointed as coach of the Italy national team and led the team to qualify for UEFA Euro 2024, where they were eliminated in the round of 16. He was sacked as Italy coach in June 2025 but in October of that year, he returned to club management as head coach of Juventus.

== Playing career ==
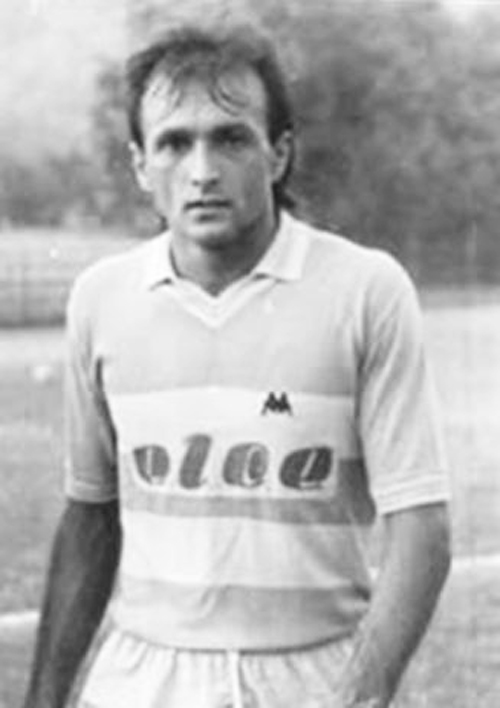
Spalletti with Entella in 1985

Born in Certaldo, Metropolitan City of Florence, Spalletti started his career as a semi-professional footballer in his mid-20s. Despite a relatively old age for a professional debut, he played for several Serie C teams such as Entella, Spezia, Viareggio and Empoli. After nearly a decade of lower-tier football in Italy, he retired in 1993 and remained at Empoli as a coach.

== Managerial career ==
=== Early career ===
Spalletti's early career in management led him to struggling Empoli, where he served as head coach from July 1993 to June 1998. He led the Tuscan side to consecutive promotions from Serie C1 to the top-flight Serie A. Spalletti then coached Sampdoria from July 1998 to June 1999, and Venezia from July to October 1999. He attended the FIGC coaching school, at the Centro Tecnico Federale di Coverciano in 1998–99, graduating with a maximum mark of 110 cum laude; his thesis was entitled "The 3–5–2 playing system".

Spalletti had two spells as head coach at Udinese. The first was between March 2001 and June 2001, the second between July 2002 and June 2005. There was a period at Ancona in between spells. At Udinese, he really began to make an impact as a manager. During the 2004–05 season, Spalletti guided Udinese to a sensational fourth-placed finish in Serie A, exceeding expectations and securing a spot in the UEFA Champions League. Spalletti became head coach of Roma in June 2005.

=== Roma ===
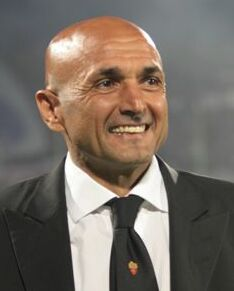
Spalletti with Roma in 2009

Such success for a traditionally unexceptional side with limited resources attracted the attention of Roma. The Giallorossi had come off a disappointing season in which four different coaches had spells in charge of the club. Spalletti was tasked with bringing order to this chaotic side. After an uninspiring first half of the 2005–06 season, he changed the team's tactics to a more offensive style rather than a defensive one. As a result, Roma climbed from 15th to 5th place in the table. However, by the end of the season, Roma failed to reach fourth place, therefore failing to qualify for the Champions League. Spalletti did manage to help Roma reach the 2006 Coppa Italia Final, but ultimately lost out on the title to Inter Milan. Nonetheless, as a result of the Calciopoli scandal, Roma qualified for the 2006–07 UEFA Champions League, as league champions Juventus were relegated, while Fiorentina and Milan both received point deductions for their involvement.

At the end of 2006, Spalletti was elected Serie A Coach of the Year. In the following months, he led Roma until the Champions League quarter-final after a 2–0 victory over Lyon at the Stade Gerland in the first knockout round. The team succeeded in becoming the first team to defeat Roberto Mancini's Inter Milan in all competitions that year, emerging with a 1–3 result at the San Siro, a match that the Nerazzurri had to win to mathematically claim the 2007 Scudetto against the only credible rival they had in the championship. Roma would also win the 2007 Coppa Italia final against Inter, with an aggregate score of 7–4; a resounding 6–2 in the first leg in Rome, followed by a narrow 2–1 defeat in Milan. It was the first important trophy in Spalletti's career, who had only won a Coppa Italia di Serie C with Empoli. But he was yet to add another piece of silverware to his cabinet, as Roma would again defeat Inter 0–1 in Milan in the opening fixture of the 2007–08 season to steal their Supercoppa Italiana crown.

In the 2007–08 Champions League first knockout round, Spalletti's Roma team became the first Italian team to defeat Real Madrid over two legs (2–1 in both ties in Rome and Madrid) and consequently also became the first European side to record two victories over Real Madrid at the Santiago Bernabéu. In a repeat of the previous season's quarter-final, Roma were again eliminated from the Champions League by eventual winners Manchester United. However, they succeeded in their defence of the Coppa Italia, once again defeating Scudetto winners Inter in the 2008 Coppa Italia final — a single match which Roma won 2–1.

Spalletti faced a difficult 2008–09 season with Roma, only managing to qualify for the UEFA Europa League with a sixth-place position in the league, after a struggling initial period that left the Giallorossi in the bottom half of the league for the first part of the Serie A season. The new season saw Spalletti struggling with a limited squad, weakened further by the sale of Alberto Aquilani to Liverpool, and compounded by serious financial problems for the club. Roma started the season by taking part in two 2009–10 UEFA Europa League qualifying rounds, both easily won against Gent (10–2 on aggregate) and Košice (10–4 on aggregate). However, another poor start in the 2009–10 Serie A season, with two consecutive defeats (2–3 to Genoa and 1–3, at home, to Juventus), prompted Spalletti to resign on 1 September 2009.

=== Zenit ===
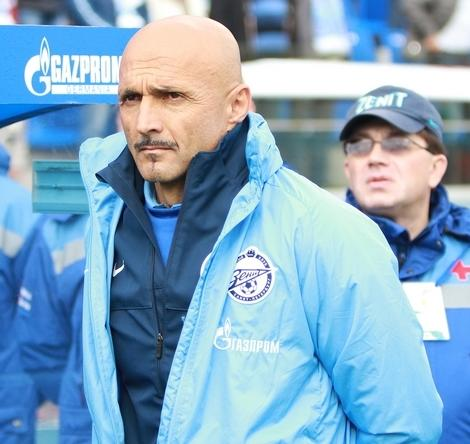
Spalletti with Zenit in 2012

In December 2009, it was confirmed Spalletti would join Russian Premier League club Zenit Saint Petersburg on a three-year deal, replacing interim coach Anatoli Davydov, with Italian coaches Daniele Baldini, Marco Domenichini and Alberto Bartali also joining the Russian club. In his first year, Zenit's board of directors expected Spalletti to win back the Premier League title, the Russian Cup, and progress past the group stage of the Champions League.

Zenit won the Russian Cup on 16 May 2010, defeating Sibir Novosibirsk in the final (having beaten Volga Tver in the quarter-final and Amkar Perm in the semi-final). After 16 matches in the 2010 Premier League, with 12 wins and four draws under Spalletti, Zenit reached 40 points, a new Russian Premier League record for points at that stage of the season. In the summer transfer window of 2010, Spalletti made his first signings: forward Aleksandr Bukharov and midfielder Sergei Semak both came from Rubin Kazan, while defenders Aleksandar Luković and Bruno Alves joined from Udinese and Porto respectively. On 25 August 2010, Zenit lost its first match under Spalletti to French side Auxerre and failed to advance to the 2010–11 UEFA Champions League group stage, though Zenit moved on to play in the group stage of the 2010–11 UEFA Europa League.

On 3 October 2010, Zenit beat Spartak Nalchik to set another Russian Premier League record for most consecutive undefeated matches with 21 since the start of the league season. On 27 October 2010, Zenit suffered its first defeat of the season at the hands of rivals Spartak Moscow, seven matches short of finishing the championship undefeated. On 14 November, Zenit defeated Rostov and, two games before the end of the season, claimed the championship title, the first of Spalletti's coaching career. Additionally, Zenit advanced from the Europa League group stage in first place to the round of 16, where they defeated Swiss club Young Boys. On 6 March 2011, Zenit defeated CSKA Moscow in the Russian Super Cup, winning Spalletti his third Russian trophy. On 17 March 2011, Zenit lost to Twente 2–3 on aggregate in the Europa League quarter-finals.

In the 2011–12 UEFA Champions League, Zenit started the group stage in Group G alongside Porto, Shakhtar Donetsk and APOEL. On 6 December 2011, Zenit finished the group stage in second place and, for the first time in club history, qualified for the spring knockout phase of the Champions League. In the first leg against Benfica, Zenit won 3–2 at home through two goals from Roman Shirokov and one from Sergei Semak. However, Zenit lost 2–0 in the second leg and were eliminated from the competition. On 9 February, Spalletti signed a three-and-a-half-year contract extension to stay at Zenit until 2015. In April 2012, Zenit won their second-straight Premier League championship after defeating Dynamo Moscow. After two trophy-less seasons, Spalletti was sacked on 10 March 2014.

=== Return to Roma ===
Spalletti was appointed manager of Roma for his second spell on 13 January 2016, after ex-manager Rudi Garcia was sacked due to poor team performances. On 21 February, Francesco Totti publicly criticized Spalletti due to his own lack of playing-time since returning from injury. As a result, Spalletti dropped Totti for Roma's 5–0 win over Palermo, causing an uproar among fans and the media. After their initial disagreements, Spalletti began to use Totti as an immediate impact substitute, which proved to be an effective decision, as Totti rediscovered his form and contributed with four goals and an assist after coming off the bench in five consecutive Serie A matches. As a result, Spalletti was able to lead Roma from a mid-table spot to a third-place finish in Serie A, clinching the Champions League play-off spot. On 30 May 2017, two days after finishing the 2016–17 season in second place, Roma confirmed Spalletti had decided to leave the club by mutual consent. During his second stint with Roma, the team qualified for the Champions League for two consecutive seasons.

=== Inter Milan ===
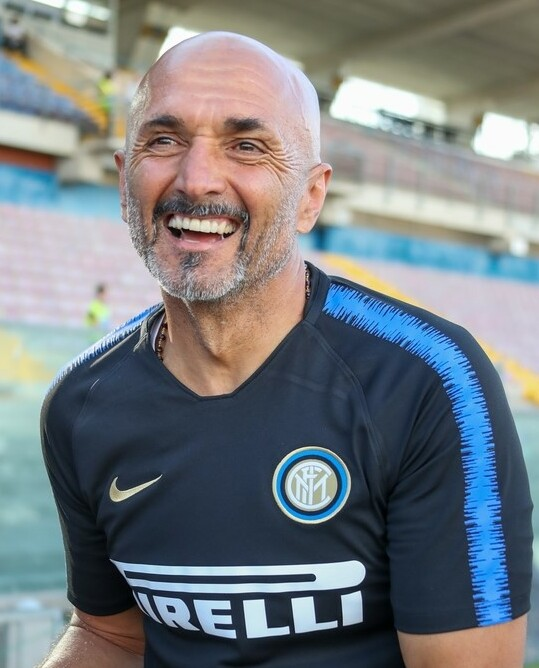
Spalletti with Inter Milan in 2018

On 9 June 2017, Spalletti was confirmed as the new manager of Inter after signing a two-year contract. This came after he travelled to Nanjing, China, to hold talks with Zhang Jindong, managing director of Suning Holdings Group, majority owner of Inter. On 29 July, Spalletti won the International Champions Cup friendly tournament in Singapore after defeating Lyon, Bayern Munich and Chelsea. On 20 August, Spalletti won his first league match with Inter after defeating Fiorentina 3–0 at the San Siro. On 26 August, he won his second match with Inter against his former club Roma, 1–3. On 3 December, Inter took first place, after twelve victories and three draws, with a 5–0 win over Chievo Verona. Inter retained their first place after a 0–0 draw against Juventus, thus becoming the only Italian team still undefeated after the first 16 weeks.

On 20 May 2018, at their last game of the season, Inter defeated Lazio 2–3 to finish the league in fourth place, and therefore qualify for the UEFA Champions League for the first time in six years. In August 2018, the club extended the contract of Spalletti, adding two more years to 2021. In the 2018–19 season, the club again secured a hard-fought UEFA Champions League finish on the last day of the competition. However, Spalletti was sacked on 30 May 2019, following speculation of his future.

=== Napoli ===
On 29 May 2021, after two years of inactivity, Spalletti was announced as the new head coach of Napoli, replacing Gennaro Gattuso. In his first season in the club, he led Napoli to finish 3rd in Serie A table, securing Champions League qualification for the first time in 2 years. In the summer of 2022, many experienced players left the team, including veteran defender Kalidou Koulibaly, club's all-time top goalscorer Dries Mertens, midfielder Fabián Ruiz and team captain Insigne. To supplant their losses, the team in return brought in players such as Giacomo Raspadori, Khvicha Kvaratskhelia, Giovanni Simeone, and Kim Min-jae.

On 7 of September, Napoli began their Champions League season by defeating 2021–22 finalists Liverpool 4–1. On 4 October 2022, Napoli routed Ajax 6–1 at the Johan Cruyff Arena, inflicting the worst defeat ever on the Dutch giant in European competitions. Despite recording their first loss of the season away to Liverpool, on 1 November, Spalletti led Napoli to finish first in their group and qualify for the knockout rounds. On 23 October, Napoli beat Roma 1–0, marking their eleventh straight victory across all competitions to match the club record set in 1986 with Diego Maradona, also going three points clear on top of the Serie A table. On 13 January 2023, Napoli crushed rivals Juventus 5–1, the worst defeat for Juventus in Serie A since 1993, as well as Napoli's tenth consecutive home win in all competitions.

On 21 January, Napoli defeated Salernitana 2–0, ensuring a twelve-point lead at the top of the Serie A table, and becoming the third side in the three points for a win era to have reached 50+ points in the first half of a single Serie A season, after Juventus in 2013–14 and Inter in 2006–07. On 15 March, Napoli defeated German side Eintracht Frankfurt 3–0 (5–0 on aggregate) to advance to the UEFA Champions League quarter-finals for the first time in the club's history. Napoli were eliminated in the next round by Milan following a 2–1 aggregate loss. On 4 May, Spalletti led Napoli to win their third Serie A title ever, and their first since 1990. Afterwards, he requested a year-long sabbatical from Napoli, which the club granted him.

=== Italy national team ===
On 18 August 2023, following the unexpected resignation of Roberto Mancini, Spalletti was appointed manager of the Italy national team, formally effective from 1 September 2023, signing a three-year contract until 2026. Italy had failed to qualify for the 2022 FIFA World Cup under Mancini after a 2022 World Cup qualification play-off defeat almost 18 months earlier. On 9 September 2023, Spalletti coached his first match for Italy, a 1–1 away draw in a UEFA Euro 2024 qualifying match against North Macedonia. On 20 November 2023, he secured his first success in the new position, by coaching Italy to qualify for UEFA Euro 2024, after holding Ukraine to a goalless draw on neutral ground in Leverkusen; Italy advanced in their place by superior head-to-head record after finishing second in their group behind England.

On 15 January 2024, Spalletti placed second in the 2023 Best FIFA Men's Coach award, behind winner Pep Guardiola. In their opening match at Euro 2024, Italy defeated Albania 2–1, then lost 1–0 to Spain, before securing a late 1–1 draw against Croatia, which saw them advance to the round of 16 in second place behind group winners Spain, with four points. Italy were eliminated from the tournament in the round of 16 following a 2–0 loss to Switzerland, with Spalletti taking "responsibility" for Italy's early exit, commenting: "We failed because of my team selection, it is never down to the players." He also cited the limited time he had to prepare the team as a difficulty after taking over the role from Mancini in August 2023. Although Spalletti was criticised by managers and pundits for Italy's poor performance throughout the competition, with rumours of dressing room tensions, lack of leadership, and disagreements over training, tactics, and squad selection also negatively impacting the squad according to La Repubblica, Spalletti did not step down from his position following the tournament, and was later confirmed as Italy coach by the chief of the FIGC Gabriele Gravina.

On 8 June 2025, following a 3–0 away loss against Norway in Italy's first 2026 World Cup qualification match, which considerably reduced the chances of direct qualification for the tournament, Spalletti held a press conference to announce he had been sacked from his role, but would stay in charge of Italy for the 9 June qualifier against Moldova.

=== Juventus ===
On 30 October 2025, Spalletti was announced as head coach of Serie A side Juventus until 30 June 2026 with option to extend the contract.

== Style of management ==
Spalletti's favoured formation while in charge of Roma was the 4–2–3–1 system, which used four defenders, two defensive midfielders, two wingers (both sides of the three), one attacking midfielder and one striker (Francesco Totti), who typically functioned also as an attacking midfielder in previous seasons. As such, the team played without any real striker, as Totti occupied what later came to be described as a false-9 role, in a 4–6–0 formation. This system proved effective for Roma upon its introduction during the 2005–06 season, as on 26 February 2006, Roma broke the Serie A record for most consecutive wins with a 2–0 victory over city rivals Lazio, following an eleven-match winning streak that started in December 2005. In this formation, he also used Simone Perrotta – normally a box-to-box midfielder – in the unorthodox role of an atypical false attacking midfielder, due to his energy and ability to make late runs, which complemented Totti's ability to provide throughballs to teammates; this decision also proved to be effective, with Perrotta scoring eight goals in the league during the 2006–07 season, while Totti finished as the golden boot winner with 26 goals. The team's offensive play was based on fluid movement and quick passing to build-attacks, centred around the distribution of midfielders David Pizarro and Alberto Aquilani.

With Napoli, Spalletti also implemented an attacking-minded style, but instead used a 4–3–3 formation. Regarding his tactical approach, he commented in October 2022: "Systems no longer exist in football; it's all about the spaces left by the opposition. You must be quick to spot them and know the right moment to strike, have the courage to start the move even when pressed." In addition to his tactical prowess, Spalletti drew praise in the media for his ability to instill a positive team mentality and unity in the dressing room upon being appointed Italy manager. In the lead-up to Euro 2024, he often used a fluid 4–3–3 formation, which could become a 4–2–3–1 formation, as well as the 3–4–2–1 and 4–4–2 formations on occasion. Prior to Italy's final warm-up games before the tournament, he expressed his desire to put together a team that had a fluid shape tactically, and versatile players who were capable of pressing opponents, building plays, and exploiting spaces, in contrast to Italy's historic reputation for defending well and then counter-attacking. In the final tournament, as was the case during qualifying, he used a fluid 4–2–3–1 formation in the opening two matches against Albania and Spain, which became a 3–4–2–1 at times, before switching to a 3–5–2 formation in the final group match against Croatia. Following Italy's early exit from the tournament, however, certain pundits and managers questioned whether Spalletti's style was more suited to club football rather than international football.

== Personal life ==
Spalletti and his wife Tamara have three children. He owns a family farm in Tuscany, on a ridge outside Montaione.

== Managerial statistics ==
As of 22 November 2026

Managerial record by team and tenure
Team	From	To	Record								
Team	From	To	G	W	D	L	GF	GA	GD	Win %	Ref.
Empoli	18 April 1994	14 June 1994	8	2	3	3	8	9	−1	25.00	
Empoli	1 July 1995	30 June 1998	128	57	37	34	163	127	+36	44.53	
Sampdoria	1 July 1998	14 December 1998	23	8	5	10	23	32	−9	34.78	
Sampdoria	1 February 1999	30 June 1999	15	6	3	6	21	20	+1	40.00	
Venezia	1 July 1999	31 October 1999	10	2	3	5	7	11	−4	20.00	
Venezia	29 November 1999	7 February 2000	13	4	3	6	14	22	−8	30.77	
Udinese	19 March 2001	30 June 2001	11	2	4	5	13	19	−6	18.18	
Ancona	28 December 2001	30 June 2002	20	8	5	7	27	25	+2	40.00	
Udinese	1 July 2002	6 June 2005	122	53	32	37	165	142	+23	43.44	
Roma	17 June 2005	1 September 2009	224	122	53	49	414	262	+152	54.46	
Zenit Saint Petersburg	11 December 2009	10 March 2014	184	105	47	32	325	176	+149	57.07	
Roma	13 January 2016	30 May 2017	75	50	11	14	171	83	+88	66.67	
Inter Milan	9 June 2017	30 May 2019	90	45	26	19	141	75	+66	50.00	
Napoli	29 May 2021	1 July 2023	96	62	16	18	198	89	+109	64.58	
Italy	1 September 2023	9 June 2025	24	12	6	6	40	29	+11	50.00	
Juventus	30 October 2025	present	54	29	15	10	94	54	+40	53.70	
Total			1,097	567	269	261	1,824	1,177	+647	51.69	

== Honours ==
=== Manager ===
Empoli

- Serie B promotion: 1996–97
- Serie C1 playoff winner: 1995–96
- Coppa Italia Serie C: 1995–96

Roma

- Coppa Italia: 2006–07, 2007–08
- Supercoppa Italiana: 2007

Zenit Saint Petersburg

- Russian Premier League: 2010, 2011–12
- Russian Cup: 2009–10
- Russian Super Cup: 2011

Napoli

- Serie A: 2022–23

Individual

- Serie A Coach of the Year: 2006, 2007, 2023
- Panchina d'Oro: 2004–05, 2022–23
- Serie A Coach of the Month: September 2021, February 2022, October 2022, January 2023, April 2026
- Serie A Coach of the Season: 2022–23
- Enzo Bearzot Award: 2023
- Italian Football Hall of Fame: 2023

== See also ==
- List of football managers with the most matches
- List of Juventus FC managers
- List of Inter Milan managers
- List of AS Roma managers
