= Renato De Manzano =

Italian footballer

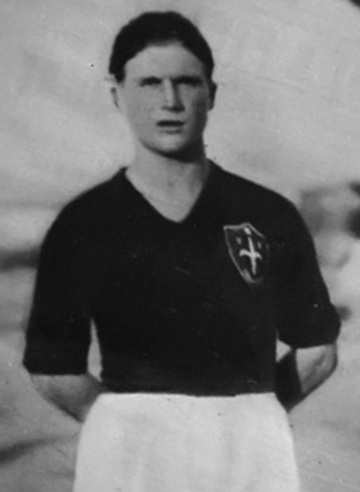
- Photo taken from "Domenica Sportiva" of June 18, 1933

Personal information
- Date of birth: March 19, 1907
- Place of birth: Trieste, Austria-Hungary, now Italy
- Date of death: 25 September 1968 (aged 61)
- Place of death: Trieste, Italy
- Height: 1.65 m (5 ft 5 in)
- Position: Midfielder

Senior career*
Years	Team	Apps	(Gls)
1925–1927	Ponziana Trieste		
1927–1928	Triestina		
1928–1929	Spezia	27	(22)
1929–1933	Triestina	131	(32)
1933–1934	Ambrosiana-Inter	14	(2)
1934–1936	Palermo	55	(6)
1936–1937	Milan	11	(0)
1937–1939	Fanfulla	57	(13)
1939–1940	Cremonese	9	(4)
- * Club domestic league appearances and goals

Renato De Manzano (March 19, 1907 - September 25, 1968) was an Italian professional football player.
