= Pio Ferraris =

Italian footballer

Personal information
- Date of birth: 19 May 1899
- Place of birth: Turin, Italy
- Date of death: 5 February 1957 (aged 57)
- Place of death: Turin, Italy
- Position: Forward

Senior career*
Years	Team	Apps	(Gls)
1919–1923	Juventus	66	(38)
1923–1924	Casale	9	(2)
1924–1926	Bentegodi	1	(0)
1926–1927	Juventus	1	(0)
1927–1929	Savona	10	(1)

International career
1920–1921	Italy	4	(1)
- * Club domestic league appearances and goals

Pio Ferraris (Italian pronunciation: [ˈpiːo ferˈraːris]; 19 May 1899 – 5 February 1957) was an Italian footballer who played as a forward. He competed for Italy in the men's football tournament at the 1920 Summer Olympics.
