= Čestmír Vycpálek =

Czech footballer and manager (1921–2002)

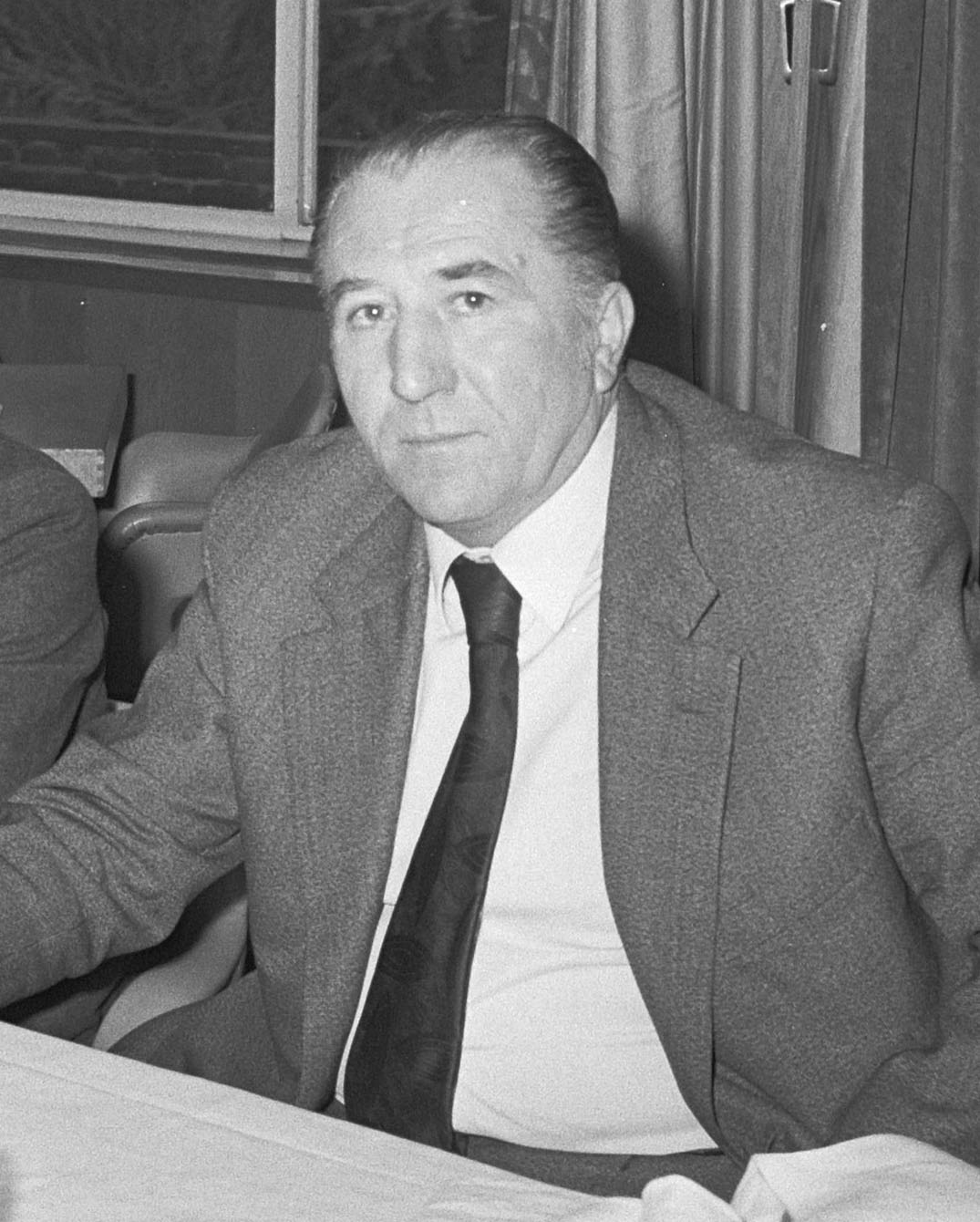
- Vycpálek (Enschede, 1971)

Personal information
- Date of birth: 15 May 1921
- Place of birth: Prague, Czechoslovakia
- Date of death: 5 May 2002 (aged 80)
- Place of death: Palermo, Italy
- Position: Right winger

Senior career*
Years	Team	Apps	(Gls)
?–1946	SK Slavia Praha		
1946–1947	Juventus	27	(5)
1947–1952	Palermo	143	(23)
1952–1958	Parma	151	(28)

Managerial career
- 1958–1960: Palermo
- 1960–1961: Siracusa
- 1962–1964: Valdagno
- 1964–1965: Palermo (youth squad)
- Juve Bagheria
- 1970: Mazara
- 1970–1971: Juventus (youth squad)
- 1971–1974: Juventus
- * Club domestic league appearances and goals

Čestmír Vycpálek (15 May 1921 – 5 May 2002) was a Czech football player and manager who played as a midfielder. He was an uncle of noted football manager Zdeněk Zeman.

== Playing career ==
A good right winger, Vycpálek moved in 1946 to Juventus from Slavia Prague, and in 1947 to Palermo, in Serie B at the time, leading the team to an immediate promotion to the top division, and playing 143 times, with 23 goals, in five seasons for the rosanero. In the season 1952–1953, Vycpálek then signed for Parma, where he played at Serie B and Serie C level. Vycpálek abandoned his playing career in 1958, at the age of 37.

== Coaching career ==
Before to enjoy some relevant success at the managing level, Vycpálek had several minor experiences, often not particularly lucky. He started his coaching career for Palermo, where he relocated with his family after Czechoslovakia was occupied by the Soviet Red Army after the Prague Spring. He then coached minor league teams such as Siracusa, Valdagno and Juve Bagheria.

In the early 1970s, however, after having been fired by Sicilian Serie D team Mazara, Vycpálek went back to Juventus, thanks also to his old friend Giampiero Boniperti, who was a board member in that times, and became coach for the youth team. But, in 1971, after the sudden death of Armando Picchi, Vycpálek was named new head coach of Juventus. It was the beginning of a successful period which led the team to two consecutive scudetti, in 1972 and 1973, and to the final of European Cup lost against Ajax. The team was also runner-up in the intercontinental cup taking Ajax's place, due to a 1–0 defeat against sudamerican champions Independiente. After those results, Vycpálek left the club and finished his coaching career.

== Honours ==
=== Player ===
==== Club ====
Slavia Prague

- Czechoslovak First League: 1939–40, 1941–42, 1942–43

Palermo

- Serie B: 1947–48

Parma

- Serie C:1953–54

=== Manager ===
==== Club ====
Juventus

- Serie A: 1971–72, 1972–73

== Death ==
Vycpálek died on 5 May 2002 in Palermo, the same day of the Juventus' triumph in the 2001–02 Serie A, and exactly thirty years after the death of his son Cestino in the Alitalia Flight 112 crash that happened in 1972.
