= Ercole Rabitti =

Italian footballer (1921–2009)

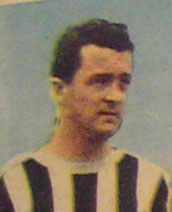
- Rabitti at Fanfulla in the 1950s

Personal information
- Date of birth: 24 August 1921
- Place of birth: Turin, Italy
- Date of death: 28 May 2009 (aged 87)
- Place of death: Ferrara, Italy
- Position: Striker

Senior career*
Years	Team	Apps	(Gls)
1939–1943 1944	Juventus	6	(1)
1945–1946	Casale	14	(0)
1946–1947	Cuneo		
1947–1948	Spezia	33	(9)
1948–1952	Viareggio	33	(9)
1952–1955	Como	116	(36)
1955–1956	Fanfulla	86	(15)
1956–1957	Cecina		
- Anconitana

Managerial career
- 1966–1967: Savona
- 1970: Juventus
- 1980–81: Torino
- * Club domestic league appearances and goals

Ercole Rabitti (24 August 1921 – 28 May 2009) was an Italian football striker and manager from Turin. Over the course of his career he played for nine teams, spending most of his time with Juventus and Como.

== Honours ==
Juventus

- Coppa Italia: 1941–42

Como

- Serie B: 1948–49
