= Július Korostelev =

Czechoslovak footballer and manager

Personal information
- Full name: Július Korostelev
- Date of birth: 19 June 1923
- Place of birth: Turčiansky Svätý Martin, Czechoslovakia
- Date of death: 18 October 2006 (aged 83)
- Position: Left midfielder

Senior career*
Years	Team	Apps	(Gls)
1945–46	SK Bratislava		
1946–47	Juventus	30	(15)
1947–1949	Atalanta	36	(9)
1949–1951	Reggina	52	(22)
1951–1956	Parma	114	(49)
1956–1957	Mantova	1	(0)

International career
1946	Czechoslovakia	1	(0)

Managerial career
- 1957-58: Perugia
- 1961: Juventus
- * Club domestic league appearances and goals

Július Korostelev (19 June 1923 – 18 October 2006) was a Czechoslovak football player and manager born in Turčiansky Svätý Martin (in modern-day Slovakia) who played as a midfielder. Although Korostelev started his career with SK Bratislava, he played the majority of his football in Italy, with clubs such as Juventus, Atalanta, Reggina and Parma.

For a brief time in 1961, Korostelev returned to Juventus as a manager, however only for the first two matches of the season before Carlo Parola returned.
