= Heriberto Herrera =

Paraguayan footballer (1926-1996)

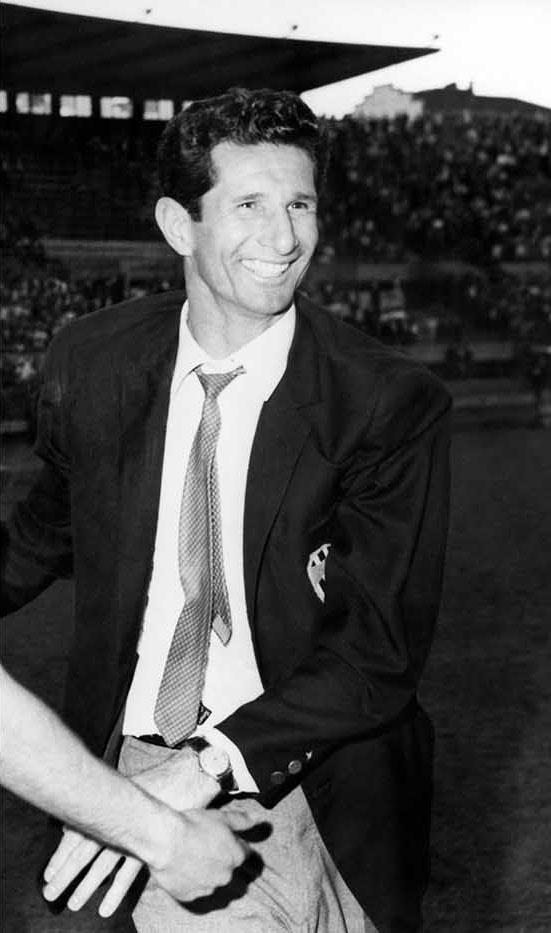
- Heriberto Herrera with Juventus in 1967

Personal information
- Full name: Heriberto Herrera Udrizar
- Date of birth: 24 April 1926
- Place of birth: Guarambaré, Paraguay
- Date of death: 26 July 1996 (aged 70)
- Place of death: Asunción, Paraguay
- Position: Defender

Youth career
- Teniente Fariño

Senior career*
Years	Team	Apps	(Gls)
1947–1953	Nacional (PY)		
1953–1959	Atlético Madrid	74	(0)

International career
1953	Paraguay	5	(0)
1957	Spain	1	(0)

Managerial career
- 1959: Rayo Vallecano
- 1960–1961: Tenerife
- 1961–1962: Granada
- 1962: Valladolid
- 1962–1963: Español
- 1963–1964: Elche
- 1964–1969: Juventus
- 1969–1971: Internazionale
- 1971–1973: Sampdoria
- 1974–1975: Atalanta
- 1975–1976: Las Palmas
- 1976–1977: Valencia
- 1978: Español
- 1978–1979: Elche
- 1982: Las Palmas
Medal record
Representing Paraguay
Copa América
Winner	1953 Peru
- * Club domestic league appearances and goals

Heriberto Herrera Udrizar (24 April 1926 – 26 July 1996) was a footballer and manager who played international football for both Paraguay and Spain as a defender.

== Career ==
Herrera played for Club Nacional of Paraguay and for several Spanish teams. While playing for the Paraguay national football team he led the team to win the 1953 Copa América against Brazil and was named the best player of the tournament. He later played one game for the Spain national football team in 1957.

As a coach, he managed Spanish teams (Elche and Valencia among them) and Italian teams Juventus and Inter Milan.

He coached Juventus from 1964 to 1969, winning one scudetto in the 1966–67 season and one Coppa Italia in the 1964–65 season. Herrera ranks fourth in most games as a Juventus coach with 162 (Giovanni Trapattoni is first with 402 games).

As the coach of Internazionale, he led the team to a second-place finish in the 1969–70 Serie A season.

== Biography ==
Herrera was born in Guarambaré. He died in Asunción in 1996.

== Honours ==
=== Player ===
Paraguay

- Copa América: 1953

=== Manager ===
Juventus

- Serie A: 1966–67
- Coppa Italia: 1964–65

== See also ==
- List of Spain international footballers born outside Spain
