= Billy Chalmers =

Scottish footballer and manager

William Chalmers
Personal information
- Full name: William Chalmers
- Date of birth: 24 July 1907
- Place of birth: Bellshill, Scotland
- Date of death: 1980 (aged 72–73)
- Height: 5 ft 9 in (1.75 m)
- Position: Inside right

Youth career
- Bellshill Athletic

Senior career*
Years	Team	Apps	(Gls)
1922–1924	Queen's Park	46	(12)
1924–1928	Rangers	19	(5)
1928–1931	Newcastle United	41	(13)
1931–1932	Grimsby Town	6	(1)
1932–1936	Bury	98	(23)
1936–1938	Notts County	65	(17)
1938–1943	Aldershot	36	(9)
Total		311	(80)

Managerial career
- Ebbw Vale
- 1948–1949: Juventus
- * Club domestic league appearances and goals

William Chalmers (24 July 1907 – 1980) was an association football player and manager who is most well known for managing Italian side Juventus during the 1948–49 season; he is the one of two Scottish managers in the club's history.

== Biography ==
Born in Bellshill, Scotland, as a player Chalmers appeared for various clubs as a forward. After starting out in Glasgow with Queen's Park then Rangers (where he won the 1924–25 Scottish Division One title in his first season with the club but then fell out of favour), he was transferred to Newcastle United in March 1928 for £2,500.

At Newcastle he played alongside club legend Hughie Gallacher, who was also born in Bellshill. Chalmers scored against Leicester City on his debut, then in his second game he scored twice against Burnley which made him become popular quickly with the Toon fans.

After his retirement from playing, Chalmers managed Ebbw Vale, Juventus and coached at former club Bury.
