= Memorial Armando Picchi =

Summer association football friendly tournament

The Memorial Armando Picchi was a summer association football friendly tournament that took place in Livorno, Italy, from 1971 to 1999. The tournament was organized in 1971 by the Italian Football Federation and the Lega Nazionale Professionisti in memory of Armando Picchi and was named Trofeo Nazionale di Lega Armando Picchi.

The trophy was designed by Alberto Lievore, working with Alvaro Marchini, and Italo Allodi to commemorate Armando Picchi, F.C. Internazionale Milano historical captain of the sixties, who died in May 1971. Competition in the initial plans was to take place annually in the month of June, with the participation of fixed (according to the rules of the time) the first two Cup finalists Italy and the top two teams in Serie A, but problems of overlapping dates it to the only organization limited the inaugural edition. First edition was played at the Stadio Olimpico in Rome. Other editions played at Stadio di Ardenza in Livorno, which changed name into Stadio Armando Picchi in 1990.

In 1971 the tournament was contested by 4 teams, with semifinals, third place match and final. In 1999 the teams played 3 round-robin 90-minute matches. If any match ended in a draw, it was decided by penalties.

== Finals ==
Year	Champion	Result	Runners-Up	Third place	Fourth place
1971	(Italy) A.S. Roma	1–0	(Italy) F.C. Internazionale Milano	(Italy) Juventus FC	(Italy) Cagliari Calcio
1972–1987	Not played.				
1988	(Soviet Union) FC Dynamo Kyiv	6–1	(Italy) Bologna F.C. 1909	-	-
1989	(Italy) A.C. Milan	0–0 (4–1 pen)	(Uruguay) Nacional Montevideo	-	-
1990–1994	Not played.				
1995	(Italy) F.C. Internazionale Milano	0–0 (4–2 pen)	(Netherlands) PSV Eindhoven	-	-
1996–1998	Not played.				
1999	(Italy) Livorno Calcio	*	(Italy) F.C. Internazionale Milano	(Italy) F.C. Esperia Viareggio	-
