= 1906 Prima Categoria =

9th season of top-tier Italian football

Prima Categoria
- Season: 1905–06
- Champions: Milan; 2nd title
- Matches played: 12
- Goals scored: 31 (2.58 per match)

The 1906 Prima Categoria was the ninth edition of the Italian Football Championship and the third since the re-brand to Prima Categoria. The Italian football championship was won that year for the second time by AC Milan.

== Format ==
The competition again featured clubs from 3 Northern Italian regions of Liguria, Lombardy and Piedmont. Unlike the year before, Juventus were the only Piedmont team to enter. The Liguria and Lombardy clubs played off against each other to decide who would represent their region in a 3 club round robin final stage.

== Qualifications ==
=== Piedmont ===
Juventus was the only registered team.

=== Liguria ===
Played on 7 January and 14 January

| Team 1 | Agg. | Team 2 | 1st leg | 2nd leg |
|---|---|---|---|---|
| Genoa | 4-1 | Andrea Doria | 3-1 | 1-0 |

=== Lombardy ===
Played on 7 January and 14 January

| Team 1 | Agg. | Team 2 | 1st leg | 2nd leg |
|---|---|---|---|---|
| Milan | 6-4 | US Milanese | 4-3 | 2-1 |

== Final round ==
=== Results ===
| Team 1 | Score | Team 2 |
|---|---|---|
| Genoa | 1-1 | Juventus |
| Genoa | 2-2 | Milan |
| Juventus | 2-1 | Milan |
| Juventus | (abd. *) | Genoa |
| Milan | 2-0 | Genoa |
| Milan | 1-0 | Juventus |

(*) The match was suspended on 1–0 and repeated in a neutral ground.

Repetition

| Team 1 | Score | Team 2 |
|---|---|---|
| Juventus | 2-0 | Genoa |

=== Final classification ===
| Pos | Team | Pld | W | D | L | GF | GA | GD | Pts | Qualification |
|---|---|---|---|---|---|---|---|---|---|---|
| 1 | Milan (C) | 4 | 2 | 1 | 1 | 7 | 4 | +3 | 5 | Tie-breaker required |
| 2 | Juventus | 4 | 2 | 1 | 1 | 5 | 3 | +2 | 5 | Tie-breaker required |
| 3 | Genoa | 4 | 0 | 2 | 2 | 3 | 8 | −5 | 2 | |

Source: Panini
(C) Champions

=== Tie-breaker ===
Played in Turin on 29 April

| Team 1 | Score | Team 2 |
|---|---|---|
| Juventus | 0-0 | Milan |

Repetition

Played in Milan on 6 May

| Team 1 | Score | Team 2 |
|---|---|---|
| Milan | 2-0 | Juventus |

Milan was declared champion.

== References and sources ==
- Almanacco Illustrato del Calcio - La Storia 1898-2004, Panini Edizioni, Modena, September 2005
