= Giovanni Goccione =

Italian footballer (died 1952)

Giovanni Enrico Goccione
Personal information
- Date of birth: ????
- Place of birth: Oulx, Italy
- Date of death: 6 December 1952
- Place of death: Susa, Italy
- Position(s): Midfielder

Senior career*
Years	Team	Apps	(Gls)
1901–1912	Juventus	37	(3)
- *Club domestic league appearances and goals

Giovanni Enrico Goccione (???? (Note: Juworld.net says that Goccione was born on 6 September 1882. calcio.com says that he was born on 1 January 1883. Myjuve.it says that he was born on 6 September 1883.) – 6 December 1952) was an Italian footballer who played as midfielder.

== Career ==
Goccione was an employee at the Società Assicurazioni Incendi in Turin. He played for Juventus for 11 seasons. Goccione played his first game with Juventus in a 1–1 draw against Torinese. Goccione was the team's capitain in the 1904–05 season, where they won Juventus' first league. Goccione's last game with Juventus was in a 1–1 against Torino on 10 December 1911. Goccione made in his career 37 appearances and three goals.

== Hounurs ==
- Prima Categoria: 1905
