= 1904–05 FBC Juventus season =

Italian football club season

Juventus
1904–05 season
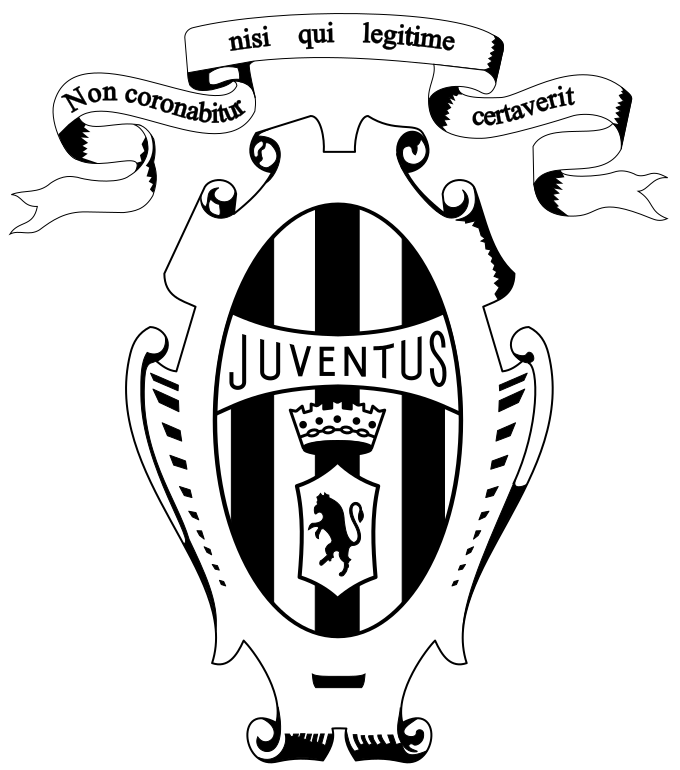
- Old Logo for the italian team Juventus
- Chairman: Alfred Dick
- Manager: Unknown
- Stadium: Velodrome Humbert I

The 1904–05 season marked a historic milestone for FBC Juventus, as the club clinched its first-ever Italian Football Championship title, laying the foundation for what would become one of the most successful dynasties in European football. In their sixth year of existence, Juventus competed in the Prima Categoria, the top tier of Italian football at the time, which featured a regional qualification system followed by a final round-robin phase.

Under the leadership of Chairman Alfred Dick, the team played its home matches at the Velodrome Humbert I in Turin. Juventus showcased a dominant performance throughout the campaign, defeating regional rivals and national contenders such as FBC Torinese, US Milanese, and Genoa. Their triumph in the final round secured not only the championship but also national recognition, establishing Juventus as a rising force in Italian football.

== Historical Context: Italian Football in 1904–05 ==
The 1904–05 season unfolded during the formative years of Italian football, when the sport was still finding its identity. The Prima Categoria—Italy’s top-tier league—was organized as a regional knockout competition, with clubs from Turin, Milan, and Genoa vying for supremacy. Matches were often played on rudimentary pitches, and rules varied slightly between regions.

At the time, Genoa CFC had dominated the early championships, winning six of the first seven titles. But this season marked a changing of the guard, as Juventus emerged from the shadows to claim their first Scudetto, signaling the rise of a new powerhouse.

Clubs were often run by expatriates and industrialists, and Juventus was no exception. Their chairman, Alfred Dick, was a Swiss businessman who played a pivotal role in professionalizing the club. Meanwhile, Milan’s squad still featured a strong British influence, with players like Herbert Kilpin, one of Italy’s football pioneers.

This era also saw the birth of inter-city rivalries, with Juventus, Milan, and Genoa beginning to forge the competitive spirit that would define Italian football for decades. The 1904–05 season wasn’t just about Juventus’s win—it was a turning point in the sport’s evolution from amateur pastime to national obsession.

== Juventus 1904–05 Squad (Known Players) ==
Not much info is known so here is a list of known players

Forlano – Forward; scored in key matches vs Genoa Pollak – Midfield or defense; played in the final round Walter Streule – Possibly involved; Swiss player linked to early Juventus Carlo Vittorio Varetti – Early club member, possibly active this season Giuseppe Hess – One of the founding players, may have still been active

== Competition format ==
The 1904–05 Prima Categoria was structured in two phases:

- Regional Qualifiers: Clubs competed within their respective regions (Piedmont, Lombardy, Liguria). The winners advanced to the final round.
- Final Round-Robin: Three regional champions—Juventus (Piedmont), US Milanese (Lombardy), and Genoa (Liguria)—played each other twice (home and away). Teams earned 2 points for a win, 1 for a draw. The club with the most points was crowned Italian champion.

Juventus won the final round with 6 points, securing their first national title.

== Match results ==
=== Regional Qualifiers ===
Date	Opponent	Result	Goalscorers
19 February 1905	FBC Torinese	3–0	—
26 February 1905	FBC Torinese	3–0	—

=== Final round ===
Date	Opponent	Result	Goalscorers
5 March 1905	US Milanese	3–0	Donna (2), Varetti
26 March 1905	US Milanese	4–1	Donna, Forlano, Squair, Varetti
12 March 1905	Genoa	1–1	Forlano
2 April 1905	Genoa	1–1	Donna

=== Final standings ===
Team	Played	Won	Drawn	Lost	Goals For	Goals Against	Points
Juventus	4	2	2	0	9	3	6
Genoa	4	1	2	1	5	5	5
US Milanese	4	0	0	4	2	8	0

== Season summary ==
Juventus entered the 1904–05 season as underdogs in a league dominated by Genoa. Under the leadership of chairman Alfred Dick, the club showed remarkable organization and tactical discipline. After comfortably dispatching FBC Torinese in the Piedmont qualifiers, Juventus advanced to the final round-robin against Genoa and US Milanese.

The Bianconeri remained unbeaten in the final phase, recording two wins and two draws. Key players such as Donna, Forlano, and Varetti contributed crucial goals, while the team’s defense held firm against more experienced opponents. Juventus finished atop the standings with 6 points, clinching their first-ever Italian championship and marking the beginning of their ascent in Italian football.

== Legacy ==
The 1904–05 season is remembered as a turning point in Juventus’s history. It was the club’s first national title and the moment they stepped onto the stage as a serious contender. The victory helped solidify Alfred Dick’s reputation as a visionary leader and laid the groundwork for Juventus’s transformation into one of Europe’s most successful football institutions.

This season also reflected the broader evolution of Italian football—from amateur enthusiasm to structured competition. Juventus’s triumph challenged Genoa’s dominance and inspired other northern clubs to invest in infrastructure, talent, and professionalism. The echoes of this season still resonate in the club’s identity, celebrated as the birth of the “winning mentality” that defines Juventus to this day.

== See also ==
- Juventus F.C.
- History of Juventus F.C.
- Prima Categoria
- Italian Football Championship
- Alfred Dick
