= Domenico Donna =

Italian footballer and lawyer (1883-1961)

Personal information
- Full name: Giuseppe Domenico Donna
- Date of birth: 30 June 1883
- Place of birth: Turin, Italy
- Date of death: 21 August 1961 (aged 78)
- Place of death: Aosta, Italy
- Position: Forward

Senior career*
Years	Team	Apps	(Gls)
1897–1910	Juventus	30	(10)
- * Club domestic league appearances and goals

Giuseppe Domenico Donna (30 June 1883 – 21 August 1961) was an Italian footballer and lawyer.

== Biography ==
A high school student in Turin at Liceo Massimo d'Azeglio, Donna (who later became a lawyer) was first known as a lively and fast striker, co-founding Juventus in 1897.

== Career ==
He was among the founding members and among the first players of Juventus, in which he had the role of right winger. He made his debut in an official match on 11 March 1900 against Turin, a 1–0 loss. His last appearance for the club was against Turin, a 3–1 defeat. During his 11 Juventus seasons he collected 30 appearances and 10 goals, and in 1905, he was among the protagonists of the club's first Italian title, in the Prima Categoria.

On 17 April 1904, he also participated in the final of the first edition of the Seconda Categoria tournament for reserves — a sort of Serie B ante litteram championship, against Genoa, a 4–0 defeat.

== Personal life ==
Prior to World War II, Donna was exiled to Villeurbanne for political reasons.

== Career statistics ==
Season	Club	Apps	Goals
1900	(Italy) Juventus	4	0
1901	(Italy) Juventus	2	3
1902	(Italy) Juventus	0	0
1902‒03	(Italy) Juventus	0	0
1903‒04	(Italy) Juventus	3	0
1904‒05	(Italy) Juventus	4	3
1905‒06	(Italy) Juventus	5	2
1906‒07	(Italy) Juventus	2	0
1907‒08	(Italy) Juventus	4	0
1908‒09	(Italy) Juventus	5	2
1909‒10	(Italy) Juventus	1	0
Totale		30	10

== Honours ==
Juventus

- Prima Categoria: 1905

Juventus II

- Seconda Categoria: 1905
