= John Savage (English footballer) =

English footballer (1867–1951)

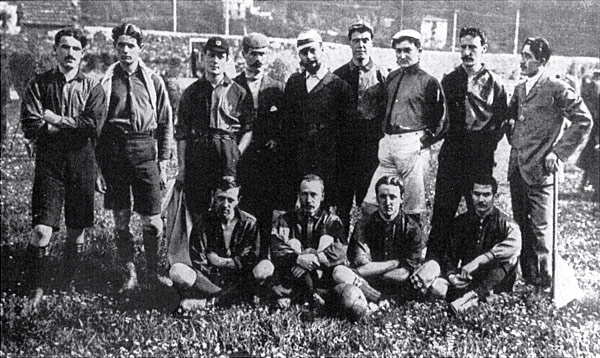
- From Left to Right: Back: Enrico Pasteur, Alfred Cartier, Paolo Rossi, John Savage (referee), James Richardson Spensley, Howard Passadoro, Karl Senft, Fausto Andrea Ghigliotti Front: Joseph William Agar, Henri Arthur Dapples, Edoardo Pasteur, Attilio Salvadè

Personal information
- Full name: Tom Gordon Savage
- Date of birth: 18 February 1867
- Place of birth: Lenton, England
- Date of death: 23 April 1951 (aged 84)
- Place of death: Nottingham, England
- Position: Forward

Senior career*
Years	Team	Apps	(Gls)
- Notts County
1887–1891	Torino Football & Cricket Club		
1891–1900	Internazionale Torino		
1900–1902	Juventus	5	(0)
- * Club domestic league appearances and goals

Gordon Thomas Savage, commonly known as John Savage, (18 February 1867 – 23 April 1951) was an English footballer who played as a forward.

== Career ==
Savage began his career in England, playing for Notts County.

Later moving to Italy, Savage was a member of the first Torino Football & Cricket Club side, playing alongside fellow Englishmen Edward Dobbie and Herbert Kilpin, the latter of whom would later become a founding member of AC Milan. In 1891, Savage signed for Internazionale Torino, following the merger between Torino Football & Cricket Club and Nobili Torino, once again playing alongside Dobbie and Kiplin, as well as compatriot George Beaton. During Savage's time at Internazionale Torino, he captained the club, as well as being called up for an Italian representative side on 30 April 1899 in a 2–0 loss against a Swiss representative side, in which is now seen as a precursor to the Italy national team.

In 1900, Savage signed for Juventus, becoming the first foreign player at the club. Over the course of two seasons, Savage made five appearances with Juventus. Savage is best known, however, for providing Juventus with their famous black and white striped shirts. In 1901, after seeing the state of Juventus' pink shirts, which Savage likened to being similar to a "gang of war survivors", Savage sent a letter to Nottingham-based tailoring company Shaw and Shrewsbury, requesting new shirts for the club. Nearly a month later, Savage presented his teammates with new black and white shirts, the same colours of former club Notts County. Initially, Juventus' Italian players were not keen on the shirts, with Juventus founding member Domenico Donna comparing them to funeral attire, however, opinions were soon changed, following the upturn in Juventus' form, with Donna labelling the new shirts as "a symbol of old fashioned Piedmontese elegance". Juventus' close connections with Notts County remain into the 21st century, with Notts County being chosen to play Juventus to open their new Juventus Stadium in September 2011.

Following his time at Juventus, Savage refereed the 1902 Italian Football Championship final between Genoa and AC Milan.
