= Carlo Vittorio Varetti =

Italian footballer (1884-1963)

Personal information
- Full name: Carlo Vittorio Varetti
- Date of birth: 1884
- Place of birth: Italy
- Date of death: 1963 (aged 78–79)
- Position: Defender

Senior career*
Years	Team	Apps	(Gls)
1900–1907	Juventus	16	(2)
- * Club domestic league appearances and goals

Carlo Vittorio Varetti was an early Italian football player at Juventus who played as a defender. When Juventus joined the Italian Football Championship in 1900 Varetti was one of the players involved; he played for the club over the course of eight seasons, being part of the bianconeri's first league title victory in 1905.

After president Alfredo Dick left Juventus to form Torino, Varetti took over as the new president. He served in the role of president from 1907 until 1910.

== Honours ==
Juventus

- Italian Football Championship: 1905
