= Finsbury (disambiguation) =

Finsbury is a district of London, England.

Finsbury may also refer to:

- Metropolitan Borough of Finsbury, borough within London which existed from 1900 to 1965
- Finsbury (London County Council constituency), constituency which existed from 1919 to 1949
- Finsbury (UK Parliament constituency), constituency which existed from 1832 to 1885, and from 1918 to 1950
- Finsbury Square
- Finsbury division
- Finsbury Dispensary
- Finsbury Growth & Income Trust, investment fund in FTSE 250
- Finsbury (public relations), UK company

== See also ==
- Finsbury Park, park in London
- Finsbury Park (area), area of London
