= List of football clubs in Italy by major honours won =

This is a list of the major honours won by football clubs in Italy. It lists every Italian association football club to have won any of the domestic and international trophies recognised as major titles by FIFA.

== Honours table ==
=== Key ===
Domestic trophies		Notes
IFC	Seria A	The Italian Football Championship began in 1898. The current Serie A began in 1929.
CI	Coppa Italia	The Coppa Italia began in 1922 as an annual cup for Italian football clubs. It was played again in 1926–27, but was cancelled during the round of 32. After 1935–36, the competition began annually, but the events of World War II interrupted the tournament after 1942–43, and it did not resume again until 1958, where it has been played annually continuously since.
SI	Supercoppa Italiana	The Supercoppa Italiana was a single match contested annually from 1988 to 2023. From 2023, it is played as a four-team tournament, contested by the winners and runners-up of the previous season's Serie A and Coppa Italia.
Continental trophies		
UCL	UEFA Champions League	Known as the European Cup from 1955 to 1992.
UEL	UEFA Europa League	Known as the UEFA Cup from 1971 to 2009.
UECL	UEFA Conference League	Known as the UEFA Europa Conference League from 2021 to 2024.
USC	UEFA Super Cup	Since 1972.
UCWC	UEFA Cup Winners' Cup (defunct)	Held from 1960 until 1999.
IFCF	Inter-Cities Fairs Cup	Held from 1955 to 1971. Although not organised by UEFA, it is included here because it is considered the predecessor to the UEFA Europa League.
UIC	UEFA Intertoto Cup (defunct)	Held from 1995 to 2008.
Worldwide trophies		
FCWC	FIFA Club World Cup	First edition held in 2000, then annually since 2005 to 2023. From 2025, it has been revamped to a quadriennal competition.
IC	Intercontinental Cup (defunct)	Held from 1960 to 2004. Although the competition was organised by UEFA and CONMEBOL, it was officially merged with the FIFA Club World Cup above, and the winners are recognised by FIFA as club world champions.

=== Ranking ===
As of 13 May 2026.

Rank	Club	Domestic trophies				Continental trophies								Worldwide trophies			Honours	Last trophy
Rank	Club	IFC	CI	SI	Total	UCL	UEL	UECL	USC	UCWC	ICFC	UIC	Total	FCWC	IC	Total	Total	Last trophy
1	Juventus	**36**	**15**	**9**	**60**	2	**3**	—	2	1	—	**1**	**9**	—	2	**2**	71	2023–24 Coppa Italia
2	Milan	19	5	8	**32**	**7**	—	—	**5**	**2**	—	—	**14**	**1**	**3**	**4**	50	2024 Supercoppa Italiana
3	Internazionale	21	10	8	**39**	3	**3**	—	—	—	—	—	**6**	**1**	2	**3**	48	2025–26 Coppa Italia
4	Roma	3	9	2	**14**	—	—	**1**	—	—	**1**	—	**2**	—	—	—	16	2021–22 UEFA Europa Conference League
4	Lazio	2	7	5	14	—	—	—	1	1	—	—	**2**	—	—	—	16	2019 Supercoppa Italiana
6	Napoli	4	6	3	**13**	—	1	—	—	—	—	—	**1**	—	—	—	14	2025–26 Supercoppa Italiana
7	Torino	7	5	—	**12**	—	—	—	—	—	—	—	—	—	—	—	12	1992–93 Coppa Italia
8	Bologna	7	3	—	**10**	—	—	—	—	—	—	**1**	**1**	—	—	—	11	2024–25 Coppa Italia
9	Fiorentina	2	6	1	**9**	—	—	—	—	1	—	—	**1**	—	—	—	10	2000–01 Coppa Italia
9	Genoa	9	1	—	**10**	—	—	—	—	—	—	—	—	—	—	—	10	1936–37 Coppa Italia
11	Parma	—	3	1	**4**	—	2	—	1	1	—	—	**4**	—	—	—	8	2001–02 Coppa Italia
12	Sampdoria	1	4	1	**6**	—	—	—	—	1	—	—	**1**	—	—	—	7	1993–94 Coppa Italia
12	Pro Vercelli	7	—	—	**7**	—	—	—	—	—	—	—	—	—	—	—	7	1921–22 Prima Divisione (CCI)
14	Atalanta	—	1	—	**1**	—	1	—	—	—	—	—	**1**	—	—	—	2	2023–24 UEFA Europa League
15	Udinese	—	—	—	—	—	—	—	—	—	—	**1**	**1**	—	—	—	1	2000 UEFA Intertoto Cup
15	Perugia	—	—	—	—	—	—	—	—	—	—	**1**	**1**	—	—	—	1	2003 UEFA Intertoto Cup
15	Hellas Verona	1	—	—	**1**	—	—	—	—	—	—	—	—	—	—	—	1	1984–85 Serie A
15	Cagliari	1	—	—	**1**	—	—	—	—	—	—	—	—	—	—	—	1	1969–70 Serie A
15	Vicenza	—	1	—	**1**	—	—	—	—	—	—	—	—	—	—	—	1	1996–97 Coppa Italia
15	Venezia	—	1	—	**1**	—	—	—	—	—	—	—	—	—	—	—	1	1940–41 Coppa Italia
15	Vado	—	1	—	**1**	—	—	—	—	—	—	—	—	—	—	—	1	1922 Coppa Italia
15	Casale	1	—	—	**1**	—	—	—	—	—	—	—	—	—	—	—	1	1913–14 Prima Categoria
15	Novese	1	—	—	**1**	—	—	—	—	—	—	—	—	—	—	—	1	1921–22 Prima Categoria (FIGC)

Numbers in bold are Italian record totals for that competition.

== See also ==
- List of football clubs by competitive honours won
