= Oulx =

Oulx Ors (Occitan)
- Comune
- Comune di Oulx
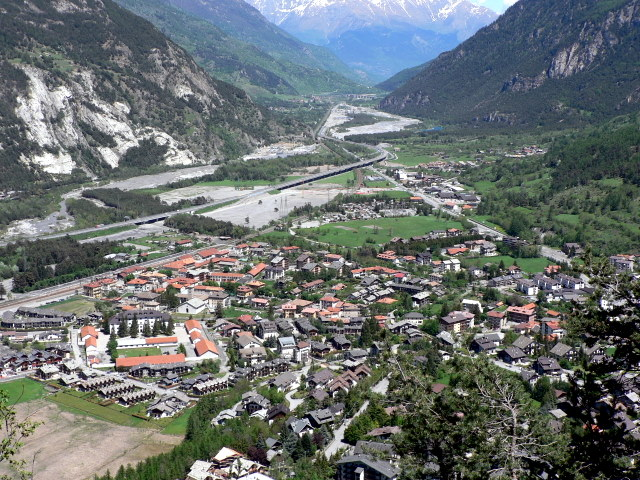
- Oulx

- Coat of arms

- Location within Italy Location within Piedmont
- Coordinates: 45°2′N 6°50′E
- Country: Italy
- Region: Piedmont
- Metropolitan city: Turin (TO)

Government
  - Mayor: Paolo De Marchis

Area
  - Total: 99.9 km^{2} (38.6 sq mi)
- Elevation: 1,100 m (3,600 ft)

Population (30 September 2016)
  - Total: 3,330
  - Density: 33.3/km^{2} (86.3/sq mi)
- Demonym: Ulcensi
- Time zone: UTC+1 (CET)
  - Summer (DST): UTC+2 (CEST)
- Postal code: 10056
- Dialing code: 0122
- Patron saint: St. Roch
- Saint day: 16 August
- Website: Official website

Oulx (Italian: [ulks], French: [u]; Vivaro-Alpine: Ors) is a comune (municipality) in the Metropolitan City of Turin in the Italian region of Piedmont, located about 70 kilometres (43 mi) west of Turin, in the Susa Valley on the border with France.

== Names ==
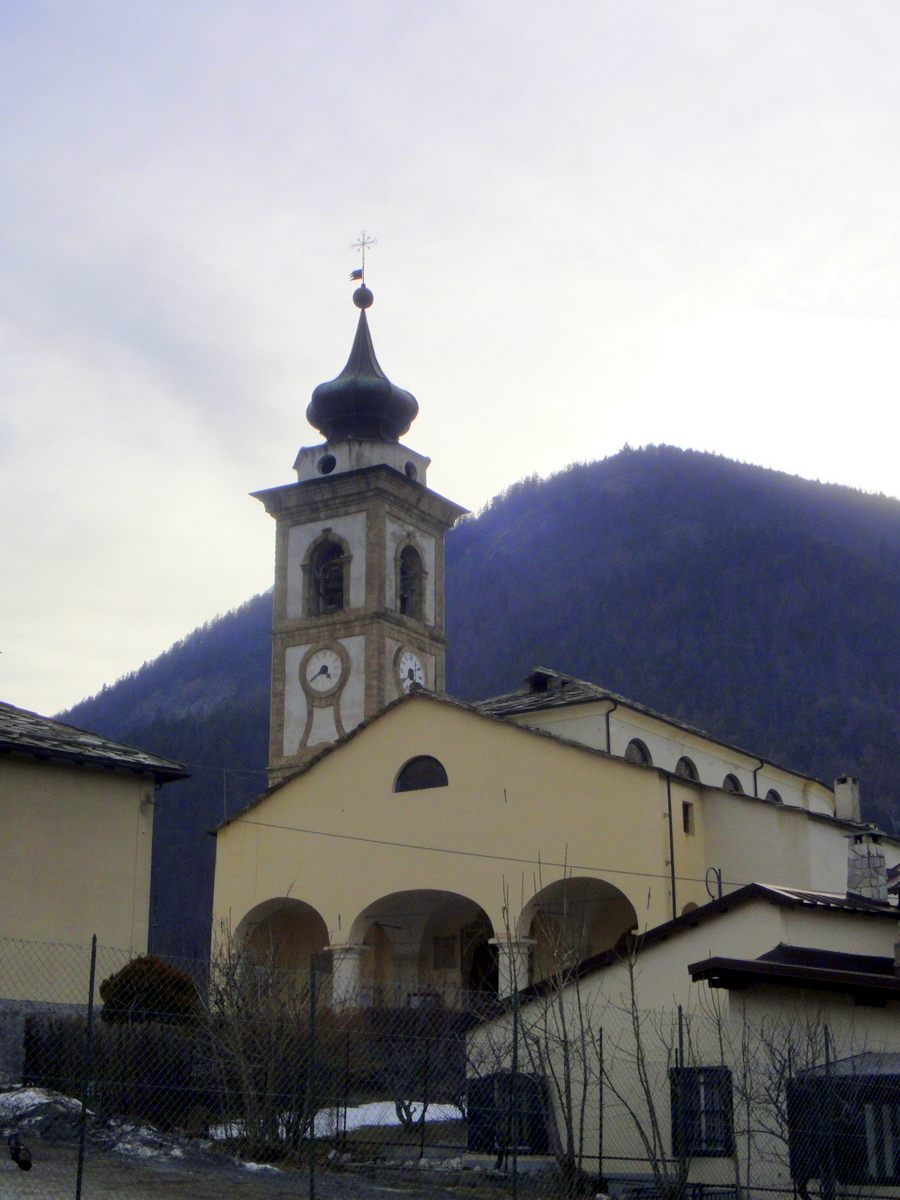
Parish Church of Oulx

Like many other towns in the Susa Valley, Oulx has different names reflecting the area's multiple linguistic traditions. One theory of the name's origin is that it derives from Ulkos, the name of a leader of the Celtic Salassi tribe. Another theory holds that the derivation is from Ultor, a title of the god Mars, to whom a temple in the area was dedicated. These names were first rendered as Ulces, and later Ulcium on maps in the Middle Ages, in Latin. From the older forms, the name became Olcs in the Occitan language and was later Francized as Oulx. As part of Italian Fascist Italianization, Oulx was renamed Ulzio from 1928 to 1947. However, this form is considered etymologically incorrect, deriving from the Latin "Ultium" rather than "Ulcium".

Evolution of the territory of Oulx. 1. Oulx. 2. Sauze d'Oulx 3. Beaulard 4. Savoulx.

Today, the municipality is called Oulx in Italian and French, Ours in the local Cisalpine Occitan (a Vivaro-Alpine subdialect; using an alternate orthography), Ors [uɾs] in standard Occitan (using classical orthography), and Ols [ʊls] in Piedmontese as well as in the Cisalpine Occitan standard (using classical orthography).

== Geography ==
There are three parts of the village of Oulx proper: Borgo Superiore (local Occitan: Viêrë), Borgo Inferiore (Plan e Poyà or simply Ël Plan), and Abadia (Baîë).

In addition to Oulx proper, the municipality includes the frazioni (districts) of Amazas (local Occitan: Zamazá), Auberges (Oouberja), Beaulard (Bioulâ), Beaume (Baoumë), Chateau-Beaulard (Chaté), Clots (Clos), Constans (Coutan), Gad (Ga), Monfol (Mounfol), Pierremenaud (Piarmenaou), Puy (Peui), Royeres (Rouliera), San Marco (Sa' Mar), Savoulx (Savou), Signols (Signoou), Soubras (Ël Soubrâ), Vazon (Lou Vazoun), and Villard (Viarâ).

Oulx is served by Oulx-Claviere-Sestriere railway station on the Turin-Modane railway.

== Twin towns ==
- Saint-Donat-sur-l'Herbasse, France (1988)

== Notable natives ==
French Revolutionist Joseph Chalier was born in the village of Beaulard, now a frazione of Oulx. Oulx was the birthplace of Luigi (Louis) Des Ambrois (1807–74), an Italian unification-era politician and jurist, who served as chairman of the Senate of the Kingdom (Senato del Regno) shortly before his death.

=== Sports ===
- Giovanni Goccione (?-1952), Italian footballer
