= Luigi Des Ambrois =

Italian politician (1807-1874)

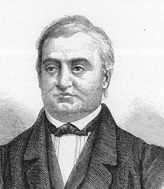
Luigi Des Ambrois

Luigi Des Ambrois De Nevache (30 October 1807 – 3 December 1874) was Piedmontese statesman that become president of the Senate after Italian unification.

== Life ==
Born in Oulx, son of an officer of Sardinian army, in 1828 he graduated in law in Turin, soon after his degree he entered as assistant of the district attorney of Turin. In 1841 he was named as prefect of Nice and in 1844 king Charles Albert named him minister of the Interior. During his tenure as minister he supported the construction of new railways and started the planning of Fejus tunnel, he also supported the implementing of the education for the young teachers and the sons of working-class families. In 1847 the king accepted his idea and the ministry of the interior was divided in 3 other department: Public Education, Public Works and Interior. After 1847 he became minister of public works. In 1848 he was one of the authors of Statuto Albertino, in July he left his post as minister. In the years after the 1848 he was elected as member of the lower house of the kingdom of Sardinia but he was soon named as president of Council of State. In 1859 he was the head of the Sardinian delegation at the congress of Zurich after the Italian Second war of independence. In 1849 he was also named senator of the kingdom, in 1874 he was elected president of the senate but he died 3 weeks later.
