= Lindsell Train =

British investment management company

Lindsell Train Limited
- Traded as: LSE: LTI (Lindsell Train Investment Trust PLC)
- Industry: Investment management
- Founded: 2000; 26 years ago
- Founders: Michael Lindsell; Nick Train
- Headquarters: London, United Kingdom
- Revenue: ▼£69.1 million (January 2025)
- Operating income: ▼£49.2 million (January 2025)
- AUM: ▼£12.8 billion (January 2025)
- Owner: Lindsell Train Investment Trust PLC (24%)
- Number of employees: 30 (2025)
- Website: www.lindselltrain.com

Lindsell Train Limited (LTL) is a British investment management company that focuses on managing equity portfolios. The Lindsell Train Investment Trust (LTI) which currently owns 24% of LTL is publicly traded on the London Stock Exchange. As of May 2025, the company has £12.8 billion in assets under management.

== History ==
In 2000, Lindsell Train was founded by Michael Lindsell and Nick Train who met while working at GT Management. The company's name is from both of their surnames.

At the end of 2000, LTL was appointed to manage the Finsbury Growth & Income Trust. It was LTL's first external client.

In 2001, the company launched Lindsell Train Investment Trust which was publicly listed on the London Stock Exchange. The purpose of it was to support the business of LTL as well as providing investors the opportunity to share in LTL's growth. Its largest holding is LTL which it owns 24% of.

In January 2004, LTL was appointed to manage Close Investments' Japanese Equity fund. In November 2009, LTL took over the fund structure and renamed it to Lindsell Train Japanese Equity Fund.

In 2006, LTL launched its UK Equity Fund which as of May 2023, has returned an average of 10.5% annually. However, in 2022, it had a loss of 6.1% due to rising interest rates and volatile markets.

In 2011, LTL launched its Global Equity Fund. While it outperformed the market on a 10-year basis, it lagged behind rival funds in 2020 and 2021.

In April 2020, it was reported that several of LTL's funds had breached compliance rules regarding concentration limits. In the previous year, Neil Woodford's investment business collapsed due to the scale of his funds' exposure to unquoted holdings which led to investors scrutinizing concentration limit rules. Hargreaves Lansdown, which had put LTL funds on its recommendation list was criticized by investors for not sufficiently disclosing LTL's compliance breaches. Hargreaves Lansdown dropped LTL's UK and Global Equity Funds from its Wealth 50 best-buy list since LTL had an exposure of 12% to Hargreaves Lansdown which was considered a conflict of interest. Morningstar, Inc. downgraded LTL's funds stating that due the low number of holdings they have, they could be far less flexible if faced with a wave of redemptions.

In 2021, LTI had its worst relative investment performance where it returned 5.6% compared to the MSCI World Index of 10.2%. This was due to it investing in consumer groups which lagged behind the performance of technology stocks. LTI suffered from outflows of £743 million. LTL that year only had £152 million of inflows while in the previous three years, it had inflows of over £2 billion each.

In May 2023, Hargreaves Lansdown raised concerns over LTL's risk management process stating it was not sufficiently assessing its investments decisions. There were concerns it lacked a robust investment risk framework that would provide strong independent oversight over the investment team. In response LTL claimed it had a clearly defined framework and also had a risk and compliance committee that would oversee risk. It also stated it had recently hired an executive to focus on risk monitoring.

In September 2023, it was reported that according to LTL's 2023 annual report, founders Lindsell and Train paid themselves and their spouses £35.5 million in dividends. This was despite the LTL funds underperforming the benchmark in recent years.

In late 2024, LTL reduced its ownership stake in Manchester United F.C. by 20%. The underperformance of the fund led to £2.6 billion of withdrawals in 2024.

In May 2025, the company reported revenues of £69.1 million for the financial year ending in January 2025, with pre-tax profits of £49.2 million. In the same year, the company paid £32.3 million in dividends to its shareholders.

== Operations ==
LTL takes a buy and hold approach to investing which involves selecting an only few stocks to invest in and holding them for a long period. Portfolio turnover and trades performed are low as a result. Companies it tends to invest in are established ones that have existing loyal customer bases such as Burberry, Nintendo and Diageo.

Lindsell Train is current manager of the Finsbury Growth & Income Trust.

As of May 2025, the company employs 30 people.
