= Finsbury Growth & Income Trust =

British investment trust

Finsbury Growth & Income Trust PLC
- Formerly: Scottish Cities Investment Trust PLC (1926–1992); Finsbury Growth Trust PLC (1992–2004)
- Traded as: LSE: FGT; FTSE 250 component
- Industry: Investment trust
- Founded: January 15, 1926
- Headquarters: British
- Website: finsburygt.com

Finsbury Growth & Income Trust PLC is a large investment fund focused on investing in the securities of UK listed companies. It is listed on the London Stock Exchange and is a constituent of the FTSE 250 Index.

== History ==
The company was established as the Scottish Cities Investment Trust in January 1926. It was acquired by Sir Walter Saloman in 1958. It became the Finsbury Growth Trust in April 1992 and adopted its current name in May 2004. The fund is managed by Lindsell Train.
