= Juventus FC =

Association football club in Turin, Italy

Juventus
- Full name: Juventus Football Club S.p.A.
- Nicknames: La Vecchia Signora (The Old Lady); Madama (The Dame); La Fidanzata d'Italia (Italy's Sweetheart); I Bianconeri (The White and Blacks) (Note: The literal translation of bianconeri is "whiteblacks". However, "black and whites" is also commonly used.); Le Zebre (The Zebras); La Gheuba (The Hunchback); La Signora Omicidi (The Killer Lady)
- Short name: Juve, JFC
- Founded: 1 November 1897; 129 years ago, (Note: The founding date of Juventus is unknown; conventionally, 1 November 1897 is used.) as Sport-Club Juventus
- Stadium: Juventus Stadium
- Capacity: 41,507
- Owner: Agnelli family (through Exor N.V.)
- President: Gianluca Ferrero
- Head coach: Luciano Spalletti
- League: Serie A
- 2025–26: Serie A, 6th of 20
- Website: juventus.com
Home colours	Away colours	Third colours

Juventus Football Club (/juːˈvɛntəs/ yoo-VEN-təs; Italian: [juˈvɛntus]; from iuventūs, Latin for 'youth'), commonly known as Juventus or colloquially as Juve (Italian: [ˈjuːve]), is a professional football club based in Turin, Piedmont, Italy. They compete in Serie A, the top tier of Italian football. Founded in 1897 by a group of Turinese students, Juventus is one of Italy's oldest football clubs and has played their home matches at Juventus Stadium since 2011. Nicknamed la Vecchia Signora ("the Old Lady"), Juventus is the most successful club in Italian football and one of the most decorated at worldwide level.

Juventus have won a record 36 Italian league titles, 15 Coppa Italia trophies, and 9 Supercoppa Italiana trophies, making them the leading club in the historical Italian Football Federation (FIGC) classification. (Note: Called "Sporting tradition" (Tradizione sportiva), it is the historical ranking maintained by the Italian Football Federation (FIGC), based on a weighted system that considers clubs' official domestic honours and participation in the top three professional divisions. The FIGC uses the ranking for certain sporting and administrative purposes.) Internationally, the club has won two European Cup/UEFA Champions League titles, one European Cup Winners' Cup, three UEFA Cups, two Intercontinental Cups, two UEFA Super Cups, and one UEFA Intertoto Cup. With eleven international trophies, Juventus occupy the sixth position in Europe and 12th position worldwide for most confederation titles; they are placed fourth in the all-time Union of European Football Associations (UEFA) ranking, (Note: As of June 2020, Union of European Football Associations (UEFA), based in its own coefficient's standard calculation procedure, what includes bonus points for any single competition phase reached by clubs since the round of 16 and, more generally, between any single competition; applies two points for each match won and one point for each point drawn in European Champions' Cup and Champions League, UEFA Cup and Europa League, UEFA Super Cup, Cup Winners' Cup, UEFA Intertoto Cup and Intercontinental Cup for historical-statistical purposes; not considering the introduction of three points for a match won at international level in 1994–95 season.) having obtained the highest coefficient score during seven seasons since its introduction in 1979, the most for an Italian team in both cases and joint second overall in the last cited.

Founded as Sport-Club Juventus, the club established itself as a major force in Italian football during the 1930s and at international stage during mid-1970s. They enjoyed a period of sustained national and European success under Giovanni Trapattoni between the late 1970s and mid-1980s, winning six league titles, as well as, the UEFA Cup (1976–77), the Cup Winners' Cup (1983–84) and the European Champions' Cup (1984–85), becoming the first club to win all three major UEFA competitions. With additional triumphs in 1984 European Super Cup and 1985 Intercontinental Cup, I Bianconeri also became the first in football history to complete a clean sweep of international trophies, an improved record by winning the 1999 UEFA Intertoto Cup, and remained the only club to have won every official UEFA men's club tournament until the first 2022 Europa Conference League final.

Under Marcello Lippi in the 1990s, Juventus won five league titles and the 1996 Champions League, reaching three consecutive Champions League finals between 1996 and 1998. Between 2012 and 2020, Juventus won a record nine consecutive Serie A titles and reached two UEFA Champions League finals. Previously, in 2000 was voted the seventh best of the FIFA Club of the Century and, nine years later, was placed by the International Federation of Football History & Statistics second in the European best club of the 20th-century ranking, the highest position for an Italian club in both.

Owned by the Agnelli family since 1923, (Note: During the Italian resistance against Nazi-fascism (1943–1945), the club, at the time a multisports association, was controlled by Turinese industrialist and former Juventus player Piero Dusio through car house Cisitalia; however, various members of the Agnelli family have held various positions at executive level in the club since 1939.) Juventus is the most widely supported football club in Italy and among the most supported worldwide. Juventus players have won, among others, eight Ballon d'Or awards and three FIFA World Player of the Year awards, while the club has provided more players to the Italy national team than any other, including to its FIFA World Cup-winning squads of 1934, 1982, and 2006. Juventus have long-standing rivalries with Torino, Inter Milan, and AC Milan. Listed on the Borsa Italiana since 2001, the club is also one of the world's most valuable football clubs.

== History ==
=== Foundation and early years (1897–1913) ===
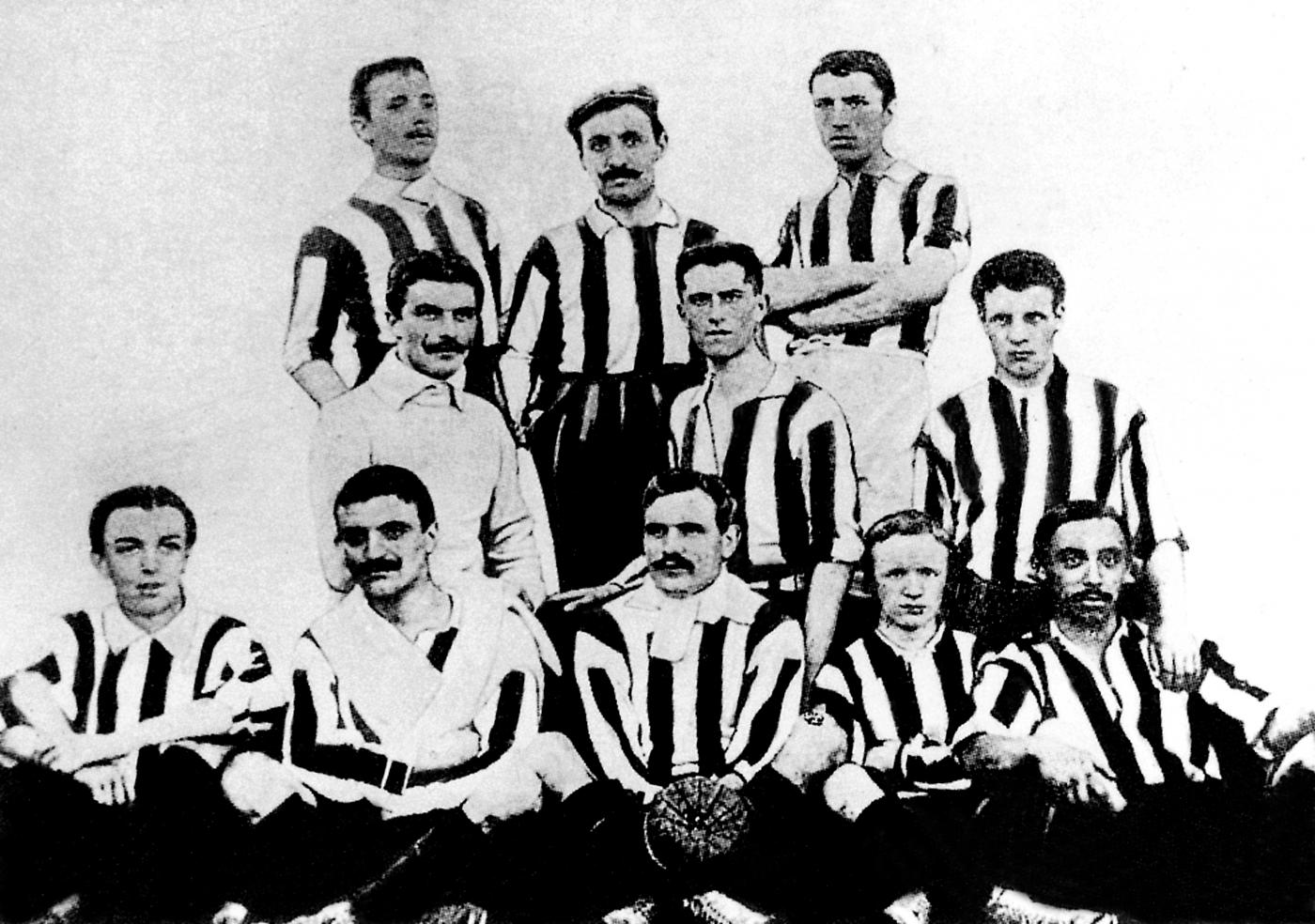
The Juventus lineup in their first league win in 1905

Juventus was founded as Sport-Club Juventus in late 1897 by students from the Massimo d'Azeglio Lyceum school in Turin, including Eugenio and Enrico Canfari. The club was renamed Foot-Ball Club Juventus in 1899, and entered the Italian Football Championship in 1900, playing their first league match on 11 March 1900 in a 1–0 defeat to Torinese.

In 1904, businessman Marco Ajmone-Marsan helped stabilise the finances of Juventus, allowing the club to move the training field from Piazza d'Armi to the Velodrome Humbert I. In 1905, Juventus won their first Italian championship. Around this period, the club adopted its famous black-and-white striped shirts, inspired by English side Notts County, replacing its original pink and black colours.

In 1906, internal disagreements over the club's future led president Alfred Dick (Note: Frédéric Dick, a son of Alfred Dick, was a Swiss footballer and joined the team of the Juventus that won the tournament of the Second Category in 1905.) and several players to leave Juventus and form FBC Torino, creating the foundations of the Derby della Mole. Juventus spent the following years rebuilding and remained active through the disruptions of World War I.

In 1913, Juventus was relegated to the second division after finishing in last place, but after pressure made by their executives to the Italian Federation, it was decided to increase the number of teams in the following season, allowing Juventus to remain in the top flight.

=== Rise to prominence and first dynasty (1923–1967) ===
The beginning of Juventus's rise coincided with the arrival of the Agnelli family. In 1923, Edoardo Agnelli, vice president of FIAT, became club president, while the inauguration of a new stadium helped provide the foundations for the club's professional development. Juventus won its second league title in 1925–26, defeating Alba Roma 12–1 on aggregate in the final.

During the 1930s, Juventus became Italy's first major professional club and dominated the national championship, winning five consecutive league titles between 1931 and 1935. Several Juventus players, including Raimundo Orsi, Luigi Bertolini, Giovanni Ferrari, and Luis Monti, formed part of the Italy national team that won the 1934 FIFA World Cup. After moving to the Stadio Comunale, the club experienced a period of transition before rebuilding following World War II.

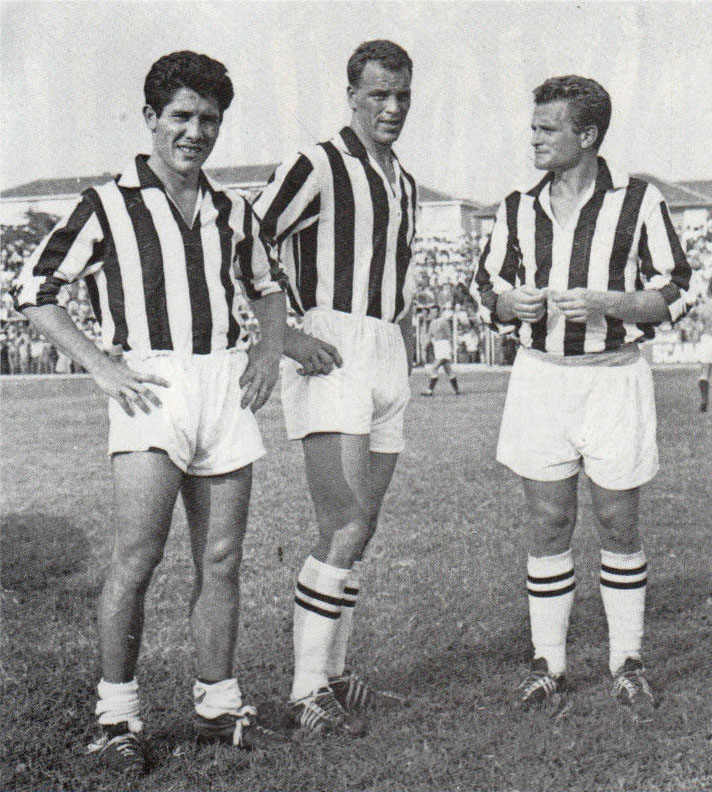
The "Magical Trio" (Trio Magico) of Omar Sívori, John Charles, and Giampiero Boniperti in 1957

Under the continued influence of the Agnelli family, Juventus returned to success in the late 1940s and early 1950s, winning Serie A titles in 1949–50 and 1951–52. The arrival of Welsh forward John Charles and Argentine-born Italian striker Omar Sívori alongside club icon Giampiero Boniperti created the renowned "Magical Trio" (Trio Magico), leading Juventus to further domestic success, including the club's first league and cup double in 1959–60. Boniperti retired in 1961 as Juventus's all-time leading goalscorer, having become one of the defining figures in the club's history. In 1961, Juventus became the first Italian club to win ten league titles, earning the right to add a gold star above its crest, a tradition later adopted by other clubs.

Juventus added another league title in 1966–67, ending the period as one of Italy's most successful clubs.

=== Domestic dominance and European rise (1971–1993) ===
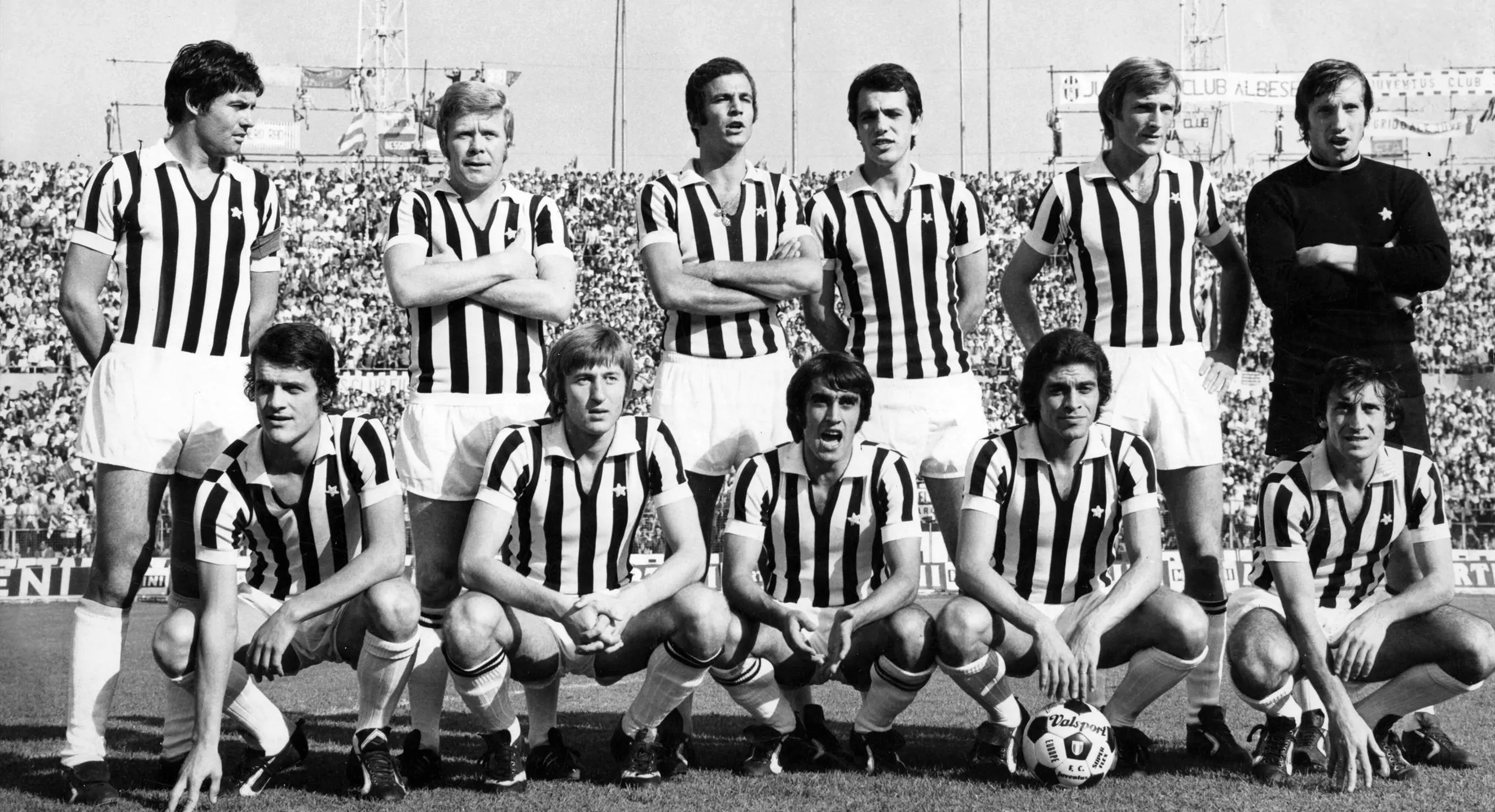
The Juventus team during the 1971–72 Serie A season

Juventus entered a new era of dominance during the 1970s, establishing itself as the leading club in Italian football. Under former player Čestmír Vycpálek, the club won consecutive Serie A titles in 1971–72 and 1972–73, with players such as Roberto Bettega, Franco Causio, and Gaetano Scirea becoming central figures. Under Giovanni Trapattoni, who took charge in 1976, Juventus continued its success, winning further league titles and securing its first major European trophy with the 1976–77 UEFA Cup.

1985 European Cup final starting lineup

The Trapattoni era continued into the 1980s, with Juventus winning three more Serie A titles by 1984, and becoming the first Italian club to win 20 league championships, earning a second golden star on its shirt. The team featured several of the leading players of the period, including Paolo Rossi, Michel Platini, (Note: The other club was Barcelona with its captain, the Argentinian star Lionel Messi. Messi was awarded Ballon d'Or for four years in a row from 2009 to 2013.) Gaetano Scirea, and Zbigniew Boniek. Platini won the Ballon d'Or three consecutive times between 1983 and 1985, while Juventus reached the pinnacle of European football by winning the 1985 European Cup final against Liverpool. The match was overshadowed by the Heysel Stadium disaster, but the victory made Juventus the first club to win all three major UEFA competitions and, after their Intercontinental Cup triumph later that year, the first club to win all five recognised international club competitions.

After the European triumph, Juventus entered a period of transition as domestic rivals such as Napoli, AC Milan, and Inter Milan challenged their dominance. The club won the 1989–90 Coppa Italia and UEFA Cup under Dino Zoff, and moved to the Stadio delle Alpi ahead of the 1990 FIFA World Cup. Despite the arrival of Roberto Baggio in 1990 for a transfer record fee, Juventus experienced limited success in the early 1990s, with their main achievement being another UEFA Cup victory in 1993.

=== Lippi era and Calciopoli (1994–2007) ===

1996 Champions League final starting lineup

The appointment of Marcello Lippi as manager in 1994 marked the beginning of one of the most successful periods in Juventus's history. In his first season, in 1994–95, the club won Serie A and the Coppa Italia, with a squad featuring players such as Ciro Ferrara, Gianluca Vialli, Roberto Baggio, and a young Alessandro Del Piero. In 1996, Juventus won their second UEFA Champions League, defeating Ajax on penalties in the final, with Fabrizio Ravanelli scoring in the 1–1 draw.

Following their European triumph, Juventus continued to dominate Italian football and became one of Europe's leading clubs. With players including Zinedine Zidane, Didier Deschamps, Edgar Davids, and Filippo Inzaghi, the club won further Serie A titles in 1996–97 and 1997–98, as well as the 1996 UEFA Super Cup and 1996 Intercontinental Cup. Juventus also reached consecutive Champions League finals in 1997 and 1998, losing to Borussia Dortmund and Real Madrid respectively. With their 1999 UEFA Intertoto Cup, Juventus became the first team to win all six major UEFA competitions.

After Lippi returned as manager in 2001, following Carlo Ancelotti's dismissal, Juventus rebuilt around players such as Gianluigi Buffon, Pavel Nedvěd, David Trezeguet, and Lilian Thuram. The club won back-to-back Serie A titles in 2001–02 and 2002–03, and reached the 2003 UEFA Champions League final, losing to Milan on penalties. Fabio Capello subsequently led Juventus to two more league titles in 2004–05 and 2005–06.

In 2006, Juventus was involved in the Calciopoli scandal, an investigation into alleged sporting fraud involving several Italian clubs. The club was relegated to Serie B for the first time in its history and stripped of its 2004–05 league title, while the 2005–06 title was later awarded to Inter. Several leading players left following the relegation, but figures including Alessandro Del Piero, Gianluigi Buffon, Pavel Nedvěd, and David Trezeguet remained. Juventus immediately returned to Serie A after winning the 2006–07 Serie B title, beginning the process of rebuilding after the scandal.

=== Rebuilding and nine-title dynasty (2007–2020) ===
Following their return to Serie A in 2007, Juventus entered a period of rebuilding after the disruption caused by Calciopoli. The club initially struggled to regain its former status, with managerial changes and inconsistent performances before Andrea Agnelli became president in 2010. Under Agnelli's leadership, Juventus underwent a major transformation, including the opening of the Juventus Stadium in 2011, which marked the beginning of a new era.

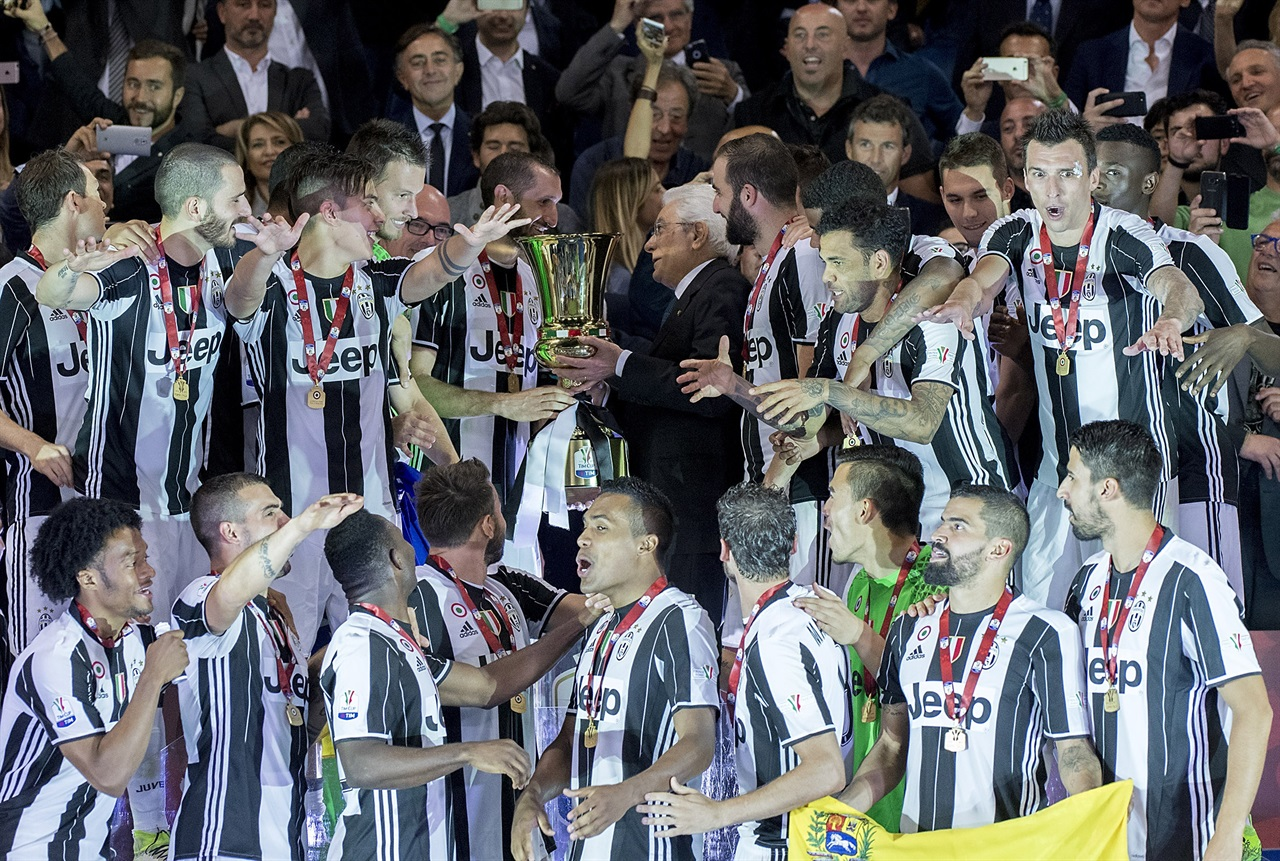
Juventus captain Giorgio Chiellini receiving the 2016–17 Coppa Italia from Sergio Mattarella, the president of Italy

With Antonio Conte as manager, Juventus returned to domestic dominance, winning the 2011–12 Serie A title unbeated as the first Italian team to do so under the 20-team format, and beginning a run of consecutive championships. The club secured three league titles under Conte, including the 2013–14 title won with a record 102 points, before Massimiliano Allegri took over in 2014. Under Allegri, Juventus extended its dominance, winning five more Serie A titles and becoming the first Italian club to win seven consecutive league championships. During this period, Juventus also achieved four consecutive domestic doubles and reached the UEFA Champions League final in 2015 and 2017, although they were defeated by Barcelona and Real Madrid respectively.

Seeking further European success, Juventus signed Cristiano Ronaldo from Real Madrid in 2018 in one of the most high-profile transfers in football history. The club won two more Serie A titles during Ronaldo's tenure, extending its unprecedented league-winning streak to nine consecutive championships by 2020. Despite its domestic dominance, Juventus was unable to secure another Champions League title, and the period ended with the departure of Allegri and the appointment of Maurizio Sarri.

=== Recent period (2020–present) ===
Juventus's period of domestic dominance ended in 2021, when Inter Milan won Serie A and brought an end to the club's record run of nine consecutive league titles. Andrea Pirlo briefly managed the team during the 2020–21 season, winning the Coppa Italia and Supercoppa Italiana, before Massimiliano Allegri returned as manager.

Allegri's second spell proved more challenging, with Juventus finishing fourth in Serie A and failing to win a trophy in 2021–22 for the first time since 2010–11. The club also experienced difficulties off the pitch, with the resignation of Andrea Agnelli's board of directors in 2022 and subsequent investigations into financial matters. Juventus received sporting penalties and, following a settlement with UEFA, missed European competitions during the 2023–24 season.

Despite these setbacks, Juventus won the 2024 Coppa Italia, their first trophy since 2021, before Allegri departed at the end of the season. Following Allegri's departure, Juventus entered a new rebuilding phase under Thiago Motta, who was later replaced by Igor Tudor, and subsequently Luciano Spalletti.

== Crest and colours ==
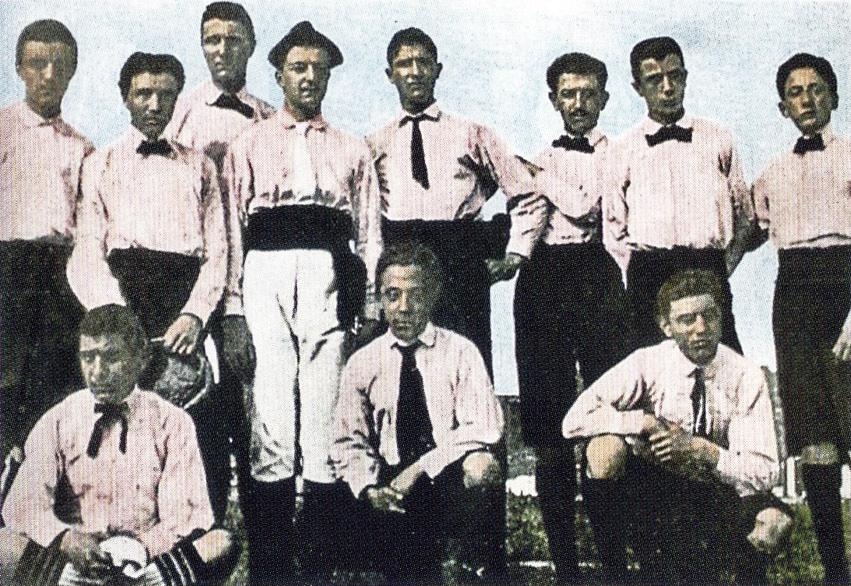
The founding team of Juventus in 1899, wearing the pink-and-black kit

Juventus have played in black and white striped shirts, with white shorts, sometimes black shorts since 1901–02 season. Originally, they played in pink shirts with a black tie. The father of one of the players made the earliest shirts, but continual washing faded the colour so much that in December 1901 the club sought to replace them. Juventus asked one of their team members, Englishman John Savage, if he had any contacts in England who could supply new shirts in a colour that would better withstand the elements. He had a friend who lived in Nottingham, who being a Notts County supporter, shipped out the black and white striped shirts to Turin. Juventus have worn the shirts ever since, considering the colours to be aggressive and powerful.

Juventus's official emblem has undergone different and small modifications since the 1920s. The previous modification of the Juventus badge took place in 2004, when the emblem of the team changed to a black-and-white oval shield of a type used by Italian ecclesiastics. It is divided in five vertical stripes: two white stripes and three black stripes, inside which are the following elements, while in its upper section the name of the society superimposed on a white convex section, over golden curvature (gold for honour). The white silhouette of a charging bull is in the lower section of the oval shield, superimposed on a black old French shield and the charging bull is a symbol of the comune of Turin. There is also a black silhouette of a mural crown above the black spherical triangle's base. This is a reminiscence to Augusta Tourinorum, the old city of the Roman era which the present capital of Piedmont region is its cultural heiress. In January 2017, president Andrea Agnelli announced the change to the Juventus badge for a logotype. More specifically, it is a pictogram composed by a stylised Black and White "J" which Agnelli said reflects "the Juventus way of living." Juventus was the first team in sports history to adopt a star as a symbol associated with any competition's triumph, who added one above their badge in 1958 to represent their tenth Italian Football Championship and Serie A title, and has since become popularized with other clubs as well.

In the past, the convex section of the emblem had a blue colour (another symbol of Turin) and it was concave in shape. The old French shield and the mural crown, also in the lower section of the emblem, had a considerably greater size. The two "Golden Stars for Sport Excellence" were located above the convex and concave section of Juventus's emblem. During the 1980s, the club emblem was the blurred silhouette of a zebra alongside the two golden stars.

Juventus unofficially won their 30th league title in 2011–12, but a dispute with the FIGC, which stripped Juventus of their 2004–05 title and did not assign them the 2005–06 title due to their involvement in the Calciopoli scandal, left their official total at 28; the club elected to wear no stars at all the following season, but added the message "30 sul campo" ("30 on the pitch", referring to the two titles that were won but vacated) underneath the badge. Juventus won their 30th title in 2013–14 and thus earned the right to wear their third star, but Agnelli stated that the club suspended the use of the stars until another team wins their 20th championship, having the right to wear two stars "to emphasise the difference". For the 2015–16 season, Juventus reintroduced the stars and added the third star to their jersey as well with new kit manufacturers Adidas, in addition to the Coppa Italia badge for winning their tenth Coppa Italia the previous season. For the 2016–17 season, Juventus re-designed their kit with a different take on the trademark black and white stripes. For the 2017–18 season, Juventus introduced the J shaped logo onto the kits.

== Stadiums ==
Juventus Stadium
- Allianz Stadium
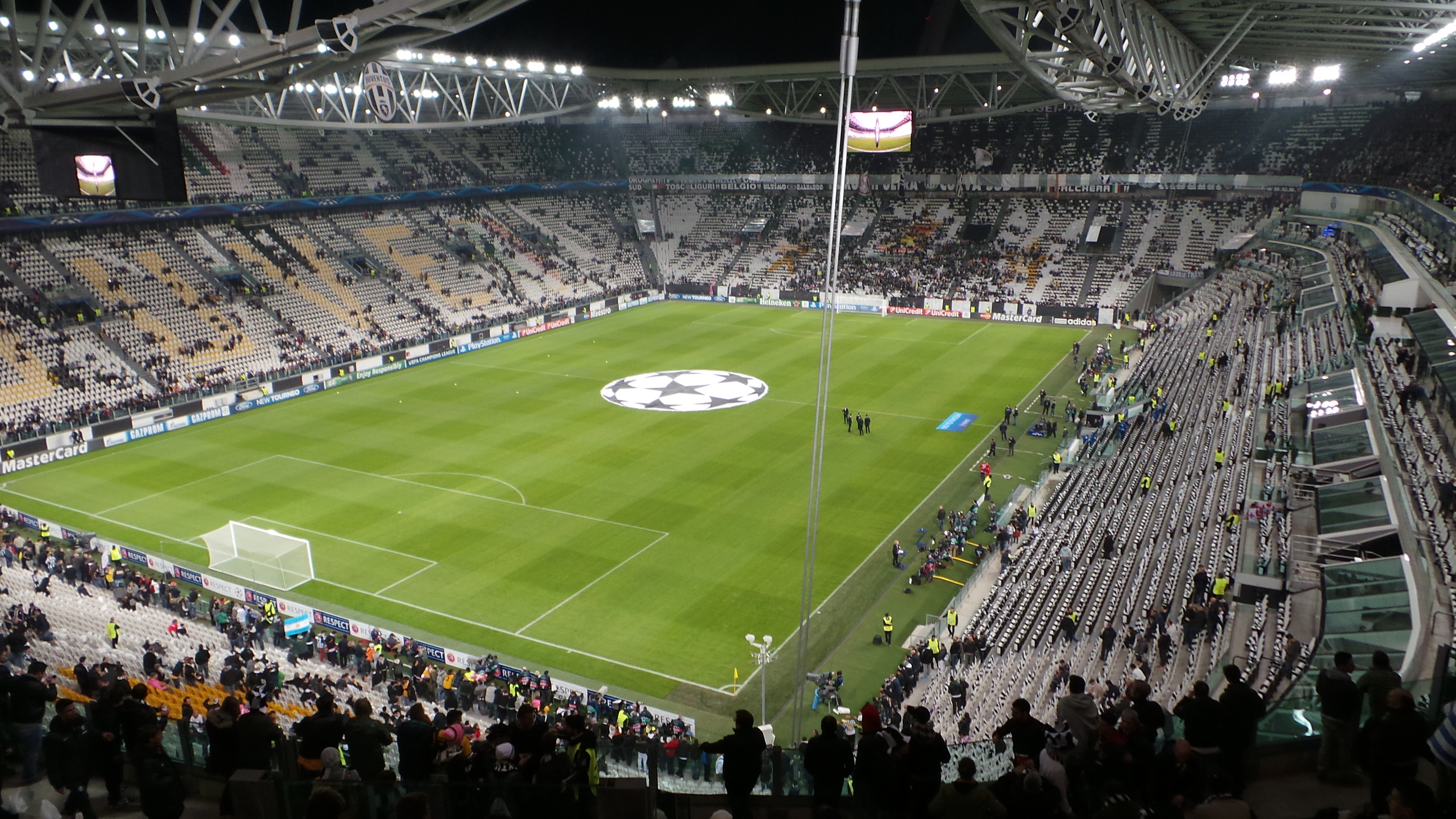
- Location: Corso Gaetano Scirea, 10151 Turin, Italy
- Owner: Juventus FC
- Operator: Juventus FC
- Capacity: 41,507 seated

Construction
- Groundbreaking: 1 March 2009
- Opened: 8 September 2011
- Cost: €155,000,000
- Architects: Hernando Suarez, Gino Zavanella, Giorgetto Giugiaro

After the first two years (1897 and 1898), during which Juventus played in the Parco del Valentino and Parco Cittadella, their matches were held in the Piazza d'Armi Stadium until 1908, except in 1905 (the first year of the scudetto) and in 1906, years in which they played at the Corso Re Umberto.

From 1909 to 1922, Juventus played their internal competitions at Corso Sebastopoli Camp before moving the following year to Corso Marsiglia Camp, where they remained until 1933, winning four league titles. At the end of 1933, they began to play at the new Stadio Benito Mussolini inaugurated for the 1934 World Championships. After the Second World War, the stadium was renamed as Stadio Comunale Vittorio Pozzo. Juventus played home matches at the ground for 57 years, a total of 890 league matches. The team continued to host training sessions at the stadium until July 2003.

From 1990 until the 2005–06 season, Juventus contested their home matches at Stadio delle Alpi, built for the 1990 FIFA World Cup, although in very rare circumstances the club played some home games in other stadia such as Renzo Barbera at Palermo, Dino Manuzzi in Cesena and the San Siro in Milan.

In August 2006, Juventus returned to play in the Stadio Comunale, then known as Stadio Olimpico, after the restructuring of the stadium for the 2006 Winter Olympics onward. In November 2008, Juventus announced that they would invest around €120 million to build a new ground, the Juventus Stadium, on the site of delle Alpi. Unlike the old ground, there is not a running track and instead the pitch is only 7.5 metres away from the stands. The capacity is 41,507. Work began during spring 2009 and the stadium was opened on 8 September 2011, ahead of the start of the 2011–12 season. Since 1 July 2017, the Juventus Stadium is known commercially as the Allianz Stadium of Turin until 30 June 2030.

== Supporters ==
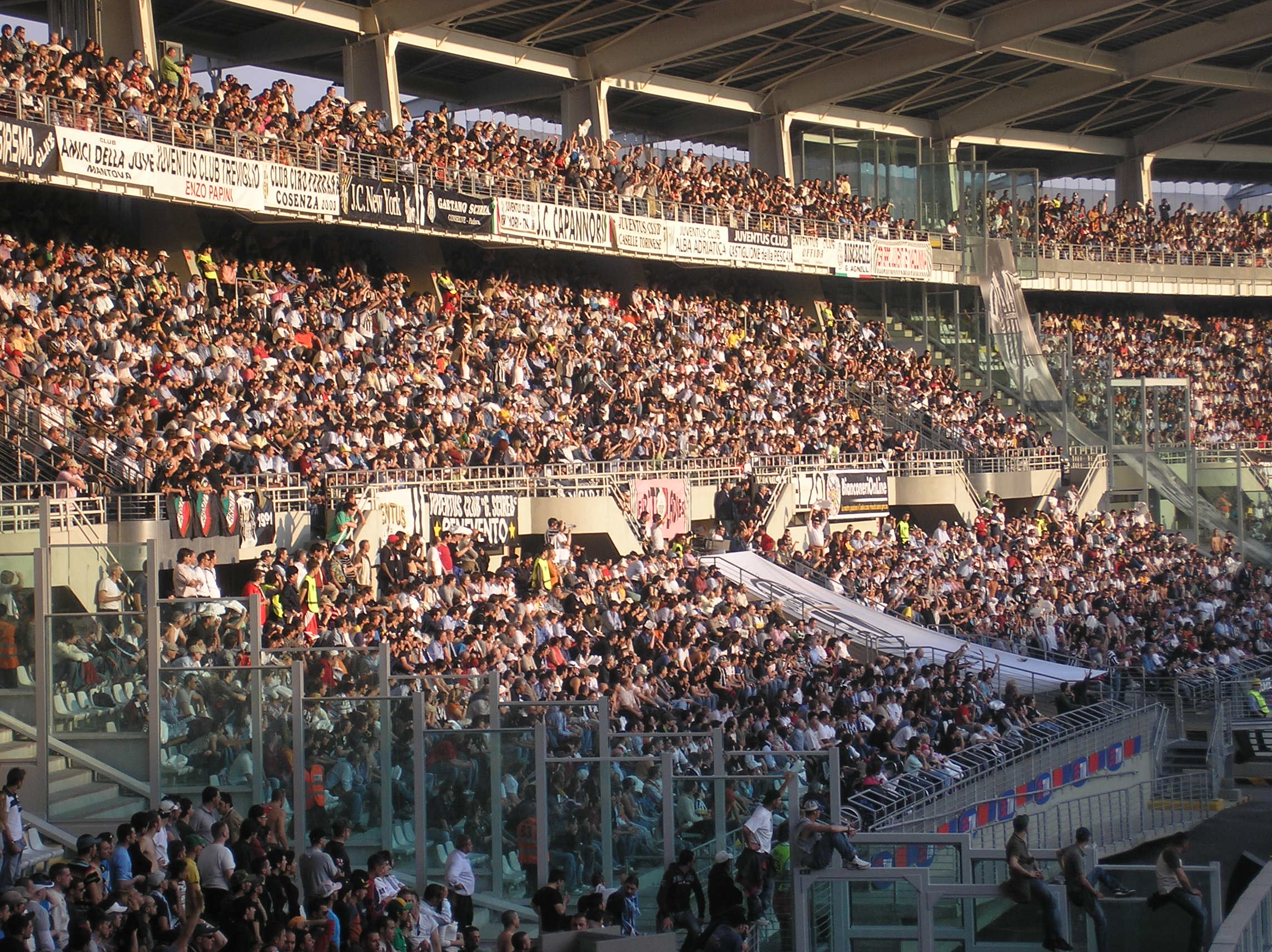
Juventus fans in 2006

Juventus is the most-supported football club in Italy, with over 12 million fans or tifosi, which represent approximately 34% of the total Italian football fans according to a research published in September 2016 by Italian research agency Demos & Pi, as well as one of the most supported football clubs in the world, with over 300 million supporters (41 million in Europe alone), particularly in the Mediterranean countries to which a large number of Italian diaspora have emigrated. Juventus has fan clubs branches across the globe. Unlike most European sporting supporters' groups, which are often concentrated around their own club's city of origin, it is widespread throughout the whole country and the Italian diaspora, making Juventus a symbol of anticampanilismo ("anti-parochialism") and italianità ("Italianness").

Demand for Juventus tickets in occasional home games held away from Turin is high, suggesting that Juventus have stronger support in other parts of the country. Juventus is widely and especially popular throughout mainland Southern Italy, Sicily and Malta, leading the team to have one of the largest followings in its away matches, more than in Turin itself.

In September 2015, Juventus officially announced a new project called JKids for its junior supporters on its website. Along with this project, Juventus also introduced a new mascot to all its fans which is called J. J is a cartoon-designed zebra, black and white stripes with golden edge piping on its body, golden shining eyes, and three golden stars on the front of its neck. J made its debut at Juventus Stadium on 12 September 2015.

=== Nicknames ===
During its history, the club has acquired a number of nicknames, la Vecchia Signora (the Old Lady) being the best example. The "old" part of the nickname is a pun on Juventus which means "youth" in Latin. It was derived from the age of the Juventus star players towards the middle of the 1930s. The "lady" part of the nickname is how fans of the club affectionately referred to it before the 1930s.

The club is also nicknamed la Fidanzata d'Italia (lit. 'the Girlfriend of Italy'), because over the years it has received a high level of support from Southern Italian immigrant workers (particularly from Naples and Palermo), who arrived in Turin to work for FIAT since the 1930s.

Other nicknames include [la] Madama (Piedmontese for Madam), i bianconeri (lit. 'the black-and-whites'), le zebre (lit. 'the zebras') (Note: The zebra is Juventus's official mascot because the black and white vertical stripes in its present home jersey and emblem remembered the zebra's stripes.) in reference to Juventus's colours. I gobbi (lit. 'the hunchbacks') is the nickname that is used to define Juventus supporters, but is also used sometimes for team's players. The most widely accepted origin of gobbi dates to the fifties, when the bianconeri wore a large jersey. When players ran on the field, the jersey, which had a laced opening at the chest, generated a bulge over the back (a sort of parachute effect), making the players look hunchbacked.

== Club rivalries ==
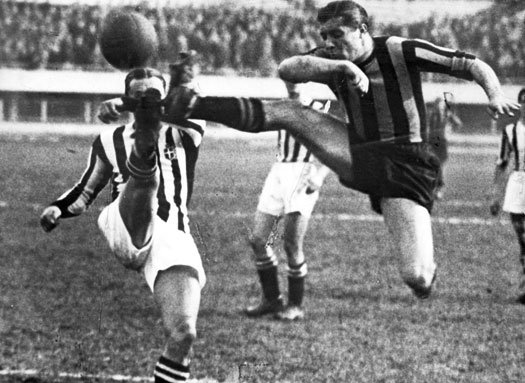
Scene from the Derby d'Italia in 1930

Juventus have significant rivalries with two main clubs. Their traditional rivals are fellow Turin club Torino; matches between the two sides are known as the Derby della Mole (Turin Derby). The rivalry dates back to 1906 as Torino was founded by break-away Juventus players and staff.

Their most high-profile rivalry is with Inter Milan, another big Serie A club located in Milan, the capital of the neighbouring region of Lombardy. Matches between these two clubs are referred to as the Derby d'Italia (Derby of Italy) and the two regularly challenge each other at the top of the league table, hence the intense rivalry. Until the Calciopoli scandal which saw Juventus forcibly relegated, the two were the only Italian clubs to have never played below Serie A. Notably, the two sides are the first and the second most supported clubs in Italy and the rivalry has intensified since the later part of the 1990s; reaching its highest levels ever post-Calciopoli, with the return of Juventus to Serie A.

The rivalry with AC Milan is a rivalry between the two most titled and two of the most supported teams in Italy. The match-ups between Milan and Juventus, is regarded as the championship of Serie A, and both teams were often fighting for the top positions of the standings, sometimes even decisive for the award of the title.

They also have rivalries with Roma, Fiorentina and Napoli.

== Youth programme ==
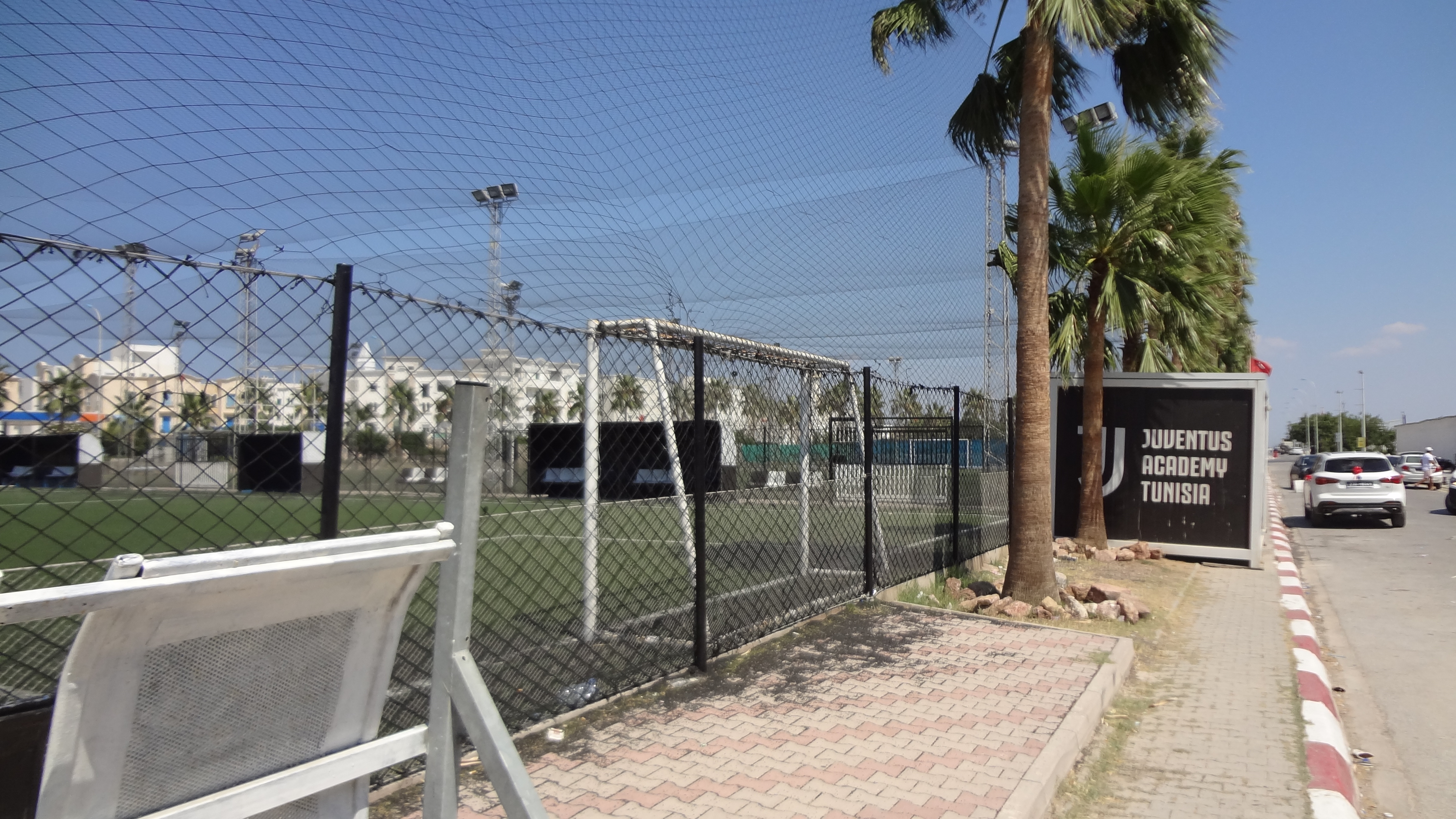
The Juventus Academy in La Goulette, Tunis, Tunisia

The Juventus youth set-up has been recognised as one of the best in Italy for producing young talents. While not all graduates made it to the first team, many have enjoyed successful careers in the Italian top flight. Under long-time coach Vincenzo Chiarenza, the Primavera (under-19) squad enjoyed one of its successful periods, winning all age-group competitions from 2004 to 2006. Like Dutch club Ajax and many Premier League clubs, Juventus operates several satellite clubs and football schools outside of the country (i.e. United States, Canada, Greece, Saudi Arabia, Australia and Switzerland) and numerous camps in the local region to expand talent scouting. On 3 August 2018, Juventus founded their professional reserve team, called Juventus U23 (renamed to Juventus Next Gen in August 2022), playing in Serie C, who won the Coppa Italia Serie C in 2020. In the 2021–22 UEFA Youth League, the U19 squad reached the semi-finals, equalling the best-ever placing in the competition for a Serie A team.

The youth system is also notable for its contribution to the Italian national senior and youth teams. 1934 World Cup winner Gianpiero Combi, 1936 Gold Medal and 1938 World Cup winner Pietro Rava, Giampiero Boniperti, Roberto Bettega, 1982 World Cup hero Paolo Rossi and more recently Claudio Marchisio and Sebastian Giovinco are a number of former graduates who have gone on to make the first team and full Italy squad.

== Players ==
=== Current squad ===
As of 28 September 2026

Note: Flags indicate national team as defined under FIFA eligibility rules; some limited exceptions apply. Players may hold more than one non-FIFA nationality.

No.	Pos.	Nation	Player
1	GK	POL	Kamil Grabara (on loan from VfL Wolfsburg)
2	DF	TUR	Zeki Çelik
3	DF	BRA	Bremer (vice-captain)
4	DF	ITA	Federico Gatti
5	MF	ITA	Manuel Locatelli (captain)
6	DF	ENG	Lloyd Kelly
7	FW	POR	Francisco Conceição
8	MF	NED	Teun Koopmeiners
9	FW	FRA	Randal Kolo Muani
10	FW	TUR	Kenan Yıldız
11	FW	KOS	Edon Zhegrova
12	MF	BRA	Douglas Luiz
13	FW	CIV	Jérémie Boga
14	FW	POL	Arkadiusz Milik
15	DF	FRA	Pierre Kalulu

No.	Pos.	Nation	Player
17	MF	BIH	Kerim Alajbegović
18	FW	ITA	Jeff Ekhator
19	MF	FRA	Khéphren Thuram
20	DF	ITA	Andrea Cambiaso
22	MF	USA	Weston McKennie
23	GK	ITA	Carlo Pinsoglio
24	DF	ITA	Daniele Rugani
25	GK	ITA	Guglielmo Vicario (on loan from Tottenham Hotspur)
26	DF	COL	Jhon Lucumí
27	FW	GER	Nick Woltemade (on loan from Newcastle United)
29	MF	SEN	Pape Matar Sarr (on loan from Tottenham Hotspur)
31	FW	ARG	Nico González
32	DF	COL	Juan Cabal
33	GK	BRA	Neto

=== Juventus Next Gen and Youth Sector ===
As of 5 November 2026

The following players are members of Juventus Next Gen or the Juventus FC Youth Sector and have been included in the Juventus matchday squad for an official competition. Shirt numbers refer to those assigned to the first team.

Note: Flags indicate national team as defined under FIFA eligibility rules; some limited exceptions apply. Players may hold more than one non-FIFA nationality.

No.	Pos.	Nation	Player
40	GK	ROU	Riccardo Radu
41	MF	ITA	Augusto Owusu
43	MF	ITA	Filippo Pagnucco

No.	Pos.	Nation	Player
45	MF	ENG	Justin Oboavwoduo
48	FW	ITA	Destiny Elimoghale
51	FW	ITA	Antonio Stefano Merola

=== Out on loan ===
As of 1 September 2026

Note: Flags indicate national team as defined under FIFA eligibility rules; some limited exceptions apply. Players may hold more than one non-FIFA nationality.

No.	Pos.	Nation	Player
—	GK	ITA	Michele Di Gregorio (at Bournemouth until 30 June 2027)
—	DF	POR	João Mário (at Fiorentina until 30 June 2027)
—	DF	SWE	Jonas Rouhi (at Carrarese until 30 June 2027)
—	MF	MNE	Vasilije Adžić (at Sassuolo until 30 June 2027)
—	MF	ITA	Giacomo Faticanti (at Avellino until 30 June 2027)

No.	Pos.	Nation	Player
—	MF	GER	Adin Ličina (at Cremonese until 30 June 2027)
—	MF	ITA	Fabio Miretti (at Beşiktaş until 30 June 2027)
—	FW	CAN	Jonathan David (at Atlético Madrid until 30 June 2027)
—	FW	BEL	Loïs Openda (at Lyon until 30 June 2027)

== Coaching staff ==
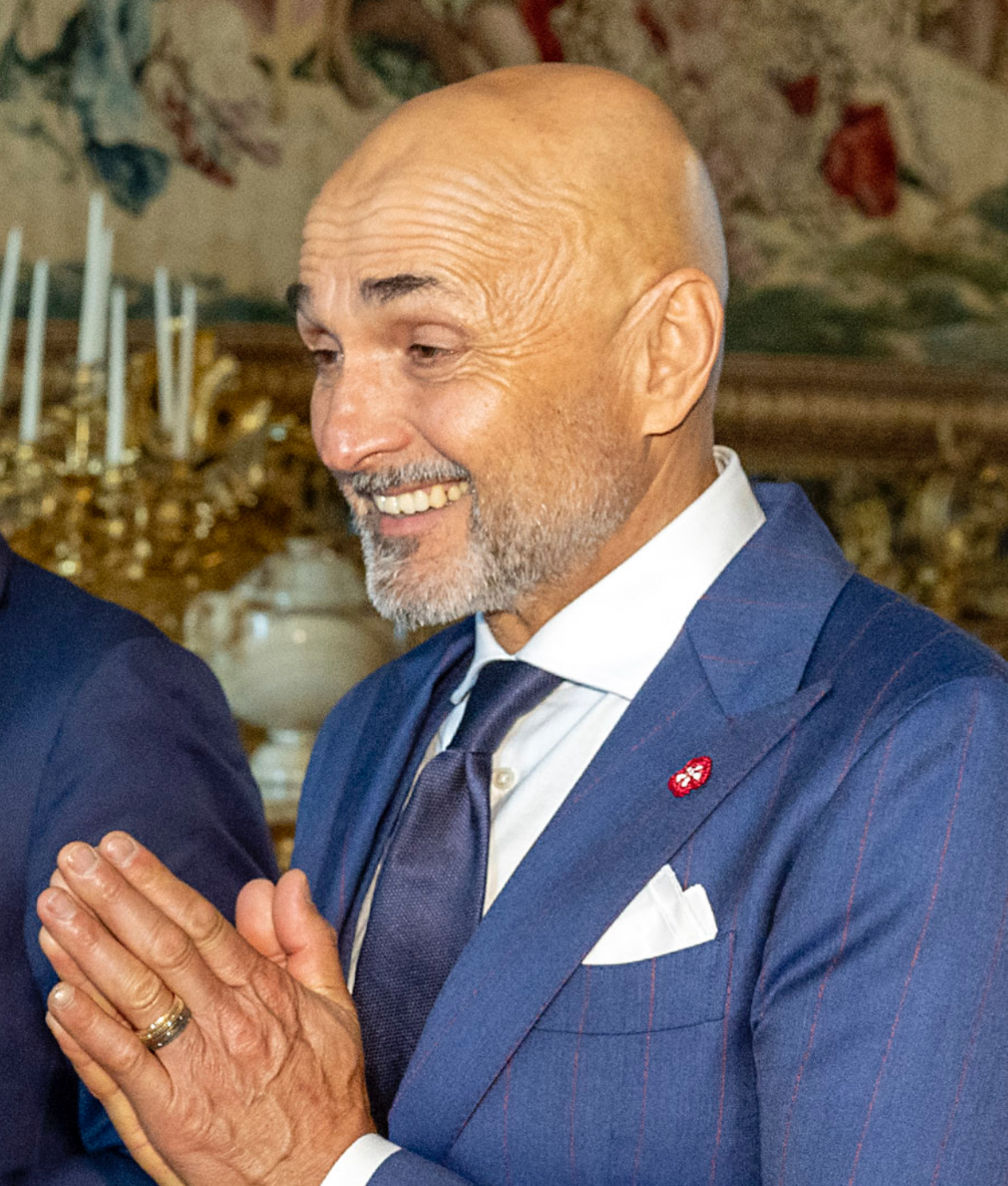
Luciano Spalletti (2024) has been the head coach of Juventus since 2025.

Position	Staff
Head coach	(Italy) Luciano Spalletti
Assistant coach	(Italy) Marco Domenichini
Technical coach	(Italy) Michele Troiano (Italy) Giovanni Martusciello (Italy) Salvatore Russo
Goalkeeping coach	(Italy) Tommaso Orsini
Performance manager	(Australia) Darren Burgess
Athletic coach	(Italy) Erminio Junior Licini (Italy) Andrea Pertusio (Italy) Francesco Sinatti
Match analyst	(Italy) Riccardo Scirea
Head of conditioning and sport science	(Italy) Duccio Ferrari Bravo
Sport science collaborator	(Italy) Antonio Gualtieri
Head of medical	(Italy) Luca Stefanini
Club doctor	(Italy) Marco Freschi (Italy) Andrea Marchini (Italy) Alberto Ghidella
Physiotherapists	(Italy) Nicola Sasso (Italy) Marco Casalis

Last updated: 1 July 2026

=== Chairmen history ===
Juventus have had overall 24 presidents (Italian: presidenti, lit. 'presidents' or Italian: presidenti del consiglio di amministrazione, lit. 'chairmen of the board of directors') and two administrative committees, some of which have been members of the club's main stakeholder group and elected since the club's foundation by the then assemblea di soci (membership assembly) through an annual meeting. Since 1949, they have been often corporate managers that were nominated in charge by the assemblea degli azionisti (stakeholders assembly). On top of chairmen, there were several living former presidents, that were nominated as the honorary chairmen (Italian: Presidenti Onorari, lit. 'honorary presidents').

Name	Years
Eugenio Canfari	1897–1898
Enrico Canfari	1898–1901
Carlo Favale	1901–1902
Giacomo Parvopassu	1903–1904
Alfred Dick	1905–1906
Carlo Vittorio Varetti	1907–1910
Attilio Ubertalli	1911–1912
Giuseppe Hess	1913–1915
Gioacchino Armano, Fernando Nizza, Sandro Zambelli (Note: Presidential Committee of War.)	1915–1918
Corrado Corradini	1919–1920
Gino Olivetti	1920–1923
Edoardo Agnelli	1923–1935
Giovanni Mazzonis	1935–1936

Name	Years
Emilio de la Forest de Divonne	1936–1941
Pietro Dusio	1941–1947
Gianni Agnelli (Note: Honorary chairman.)	1947–1954
Enrico Craveri, Nino Cravetto, Marcello Giustiniani (Note: Chairmen on interim charge.)	1954–1955
Umberto Agnelli	1955–1962
Vittore Catella	1962–1971
Giampiero Boniperti (Note: Also current honorary chairmen.)	1971–1990
Vittorio Caissotti di Chiusano	1990–2003
Franzo Grande Stevens	2003–2006
Giovanni Cobolli Gigli	2006–2009
Jean-Claude Blanc	2009–2010
Andrea Agnelli	2010–2023
Gianluca Ferrero	2023–

=== Managerial history ===
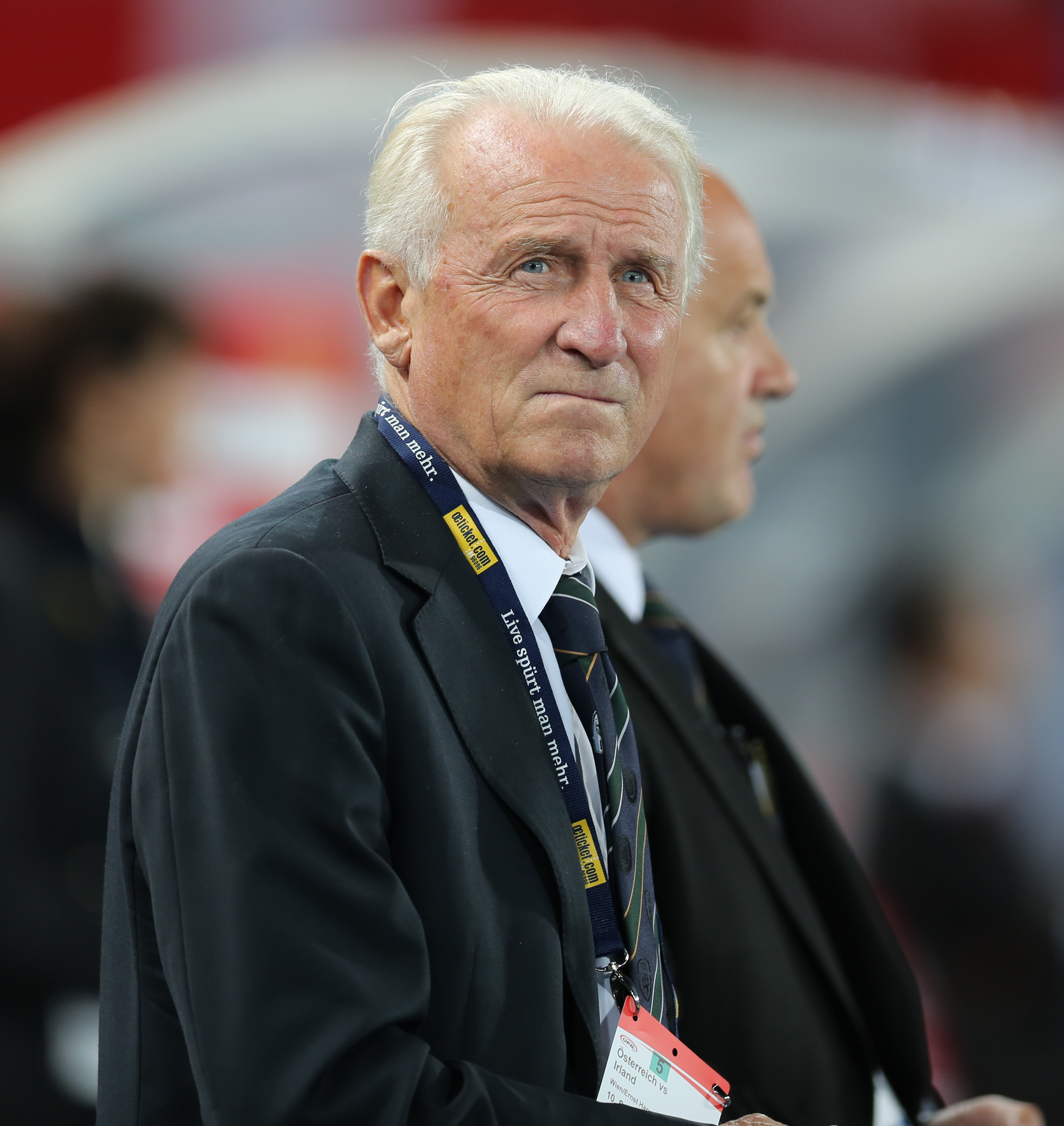
Giovanni Trapattoni, the longest serving and most successful manager in the history of Juventus with 14 trophies

Below is a list of Juventus managers from 1923, when the Agnelli family took over and the club became more structured and organised, until the present day.

Name	Nationality	Years
Jenő Károly	(Hungary)	1923–1926
József Viola	(Hungary)	1926 (Note: On interim charge.)
József Viola	(Hungary)	1926–1928
William Aitken	(Scotland)	1928–1930
Carlo Carcano	(Italy)	1930–1934
Carlo Bigatto; Benedetto Gola	(Italy) (Italy)	1934–1935
Virginio Rosetta	(Italy)	1935–1939
Umberto Caligaris	(Italy)	1939–1941
Federico Munerati	(Italy)	1941
Giovanni Ferrari	(Italy)	1941–1942
Luis Monti	(Argentina) (Italy)	1942
Felice Borel	(Italy)	1942–1946
Renato Cesarini	(Italy) (Argentina)	1946–1948
Billy Chalmers	(Scotland)	1948–1949
Jesse Carver	(England)	1949–1951
Luigi Bertolini	(Italy)	1951
György Sárosi	(Hungary)	1951–1953
Aldo Olivieri	(Italy)	1953–1955
Sandro Puppo	(Italy)	1955–1957
Teobaldo Depetrini	(Italy)	1957
Ljubiša Broćić	(Socialist Federal Republic of Yugoslavia)	1957–1958
Teobaldo Depetrini	(Italy)	1958–1959
Renato Cesarini	(Italy) (Argentina)	1959–1961
Carlo Parola	(Italy)	1961
Gunnar Gren; Július Korostelev	(Sweden) (Czechoslovakia)	1961
Carlo Parola	(Italy)	1961–1962
Paulo Amaral	(Brazil)	1962–1963
Eraldo Monzeglio	(Italy)	1964
Heriberto Herrera	(Paraguay) (Spain)	1964–1969

Name	Nationality	Years
Luis Carniglia	(Argentina)	1969–1970
Ercole Rabitti	(Italy)	1970
Armando Picchi	(Italy)	1970–1971
Čestmír Vycpálek	(Czechoslovakia)	1971–1974
Carlo Parola	(Italy)	1974–1976
Giovanni Trapattoni	(Italy)	1976–1986
Rino Marchesi	(Italy)	1986–1988
Dino Zoff	(Italy)	1988–1990
Luigi Maifredi	(Italy)	1990–1991
Giovanni Trapattoni	(Italy)	1991–1994
Marcello Lippi	(Italy)	1994–1999
Carlo Ancelotti	(Italy)	1999–2001
Marcello Lippi	(Italy)	2001–2004
Fabio Capello	(Italy)	2004–2006
Didier Deschamps	(France)	2006–2007
Giancarlo Corradini	(Italy)	2007
Claudio Ranieri	(Italy)	2007–2009
Ciro Ferrara	(Italy)	2009–2010
Alberto Zaccheroni	(Italy)	2010
Luigi Delneri	(Italy)	2010–2011
Antonio Conte	(Italy)	2011–2014
Massimiliano Allegri	(Italy)	2014–2019
Maurizio Sarri	(Italy)	2019–2020
Andrea Pirlo	(Italy)	2020–2021
Massimiliano Allegri	(Italy)	2021–2024
Paolo Montero	(Uruguay)	2024
Thiago Motta	(Italy)	2024–2025
Igor Tudor	(Croatia)	2025
Massimo Brambilla	(Italy)	2025
Luciano Spalletti	(Italy)	2025–present

== Honours ==
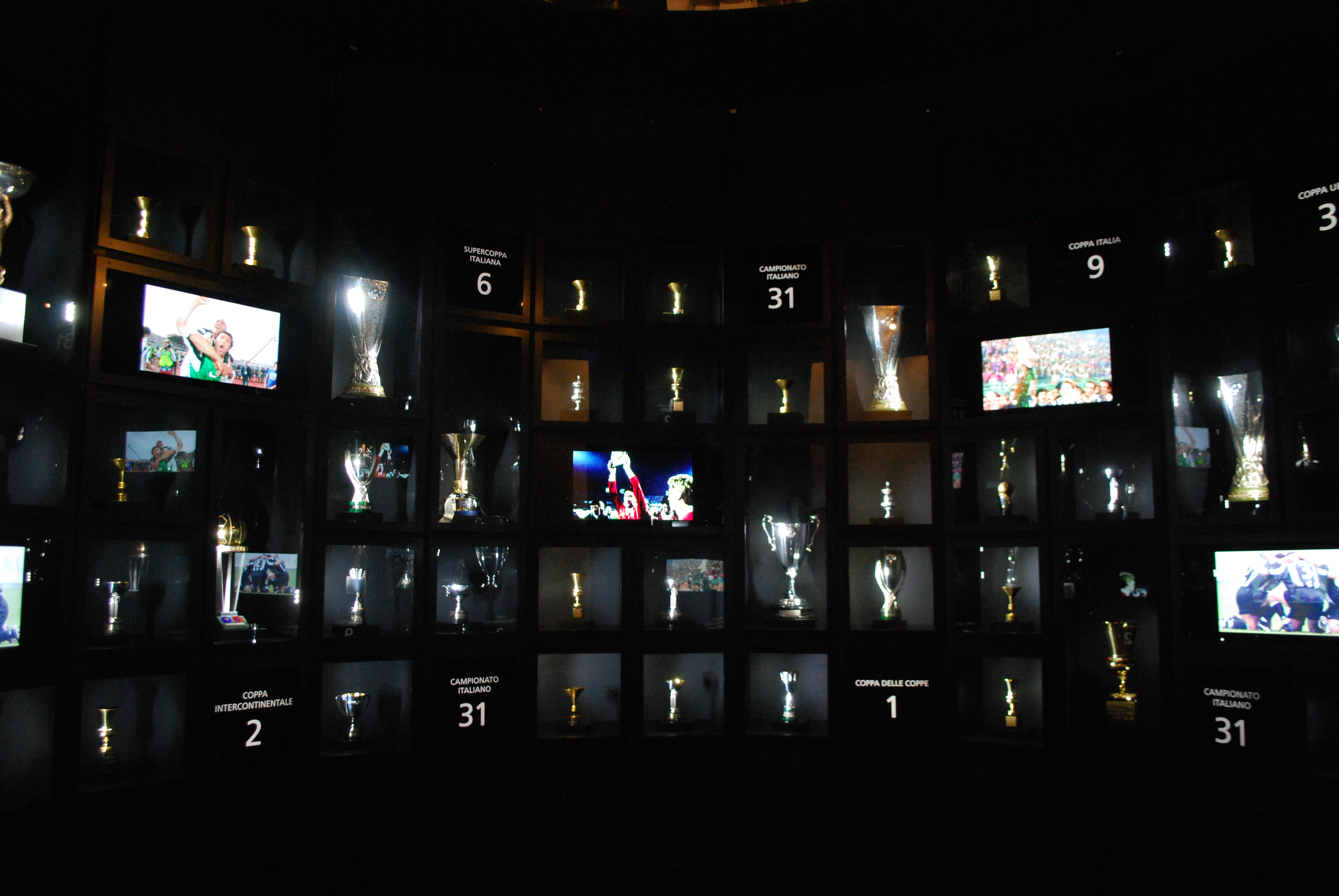
A partial view of the club's trophy room with the titles won between 1905 and 2013 at J-Museum

Italy's most successful club of the 20th century and the most winning in the history of Italian football, Juventus have won the Italian League Championship, the country's premier football club competitions and organised by Lega Nazionale Professionisti Serie A (LNPA), a record 36 times and have the records of consecutive triumphs in that tournament (nine, between 2011–12 and 2019–20). They have also won the Coppa Italia, the country's primary single-elimination competitions, a record 15 times, becoming the first team to retain the trophy successfully with their triumph in the 1959–60 season, and the first to win it in three consecutive seasons from the 2014–15 season to the 2016–17 season, going on to win a fourth consecutive title in 2017–18 (also a record). In addition, the club holds the record for Supercoppa Italiana wins with nine, the most recent coming in 2020.

Overall, Juventus have won 71 official competitions, (Note: Including exclusively the official titles won during its participation in the top flight of Italian football.) more than any other club in the country: 60 at national level (which is also a record) and 11 at international stage, making them, in the latter case, the second most successful Italian team. The club is sixth in Europe and twelfth in the world with the most international title won officially recognised by their respective association football confederation and Fédération Internationale de Football Association (FIFA). (Note: Sixth most successful European club for confederation and FIFA competitions won with 11 titles. Sixth most successful club in Europe for confederation club competition titles won (11).) In 1977, the Juventus became the first in Southern Europe to have won the UEFA Cup and the first—and only to date—in Italian football history to achieve an international title with a squad composed by national footballers. In 1993, the club won its third competition's trophy, an unprecedented feat in the continent until then, a confederation record for the next 22 years and the most for an Italian team. Juventus was also the first club in the country to achieve the title in the European Super Cup, having won the competitions in 1984 and the first European side to win the Intercontinental Cup in 1985, since it was restructured by Union of European Football Associations (UEFA) and Confederación Sudamericana de Fútbol (CONMEBOL)'s organizing committee five years beforehand.

The club has earned the distinction of being allowed to wear three golden stars (Italian: stelle d'oro) on its shirts representing its league victories, the tenth of which was achieved during the 1957–58 season, the 20th in the 1981–82 season and the 30th in the 2013–14 season. Juventus were the first Italian team to have achieved the national double four times (winning the Italian top tier division and the national cup competitions in the same season), in the 1959–60, 1994–95, 2014–15 and 2015–16 season. In the 2015–16 season, Juventus won the Coppa Italia for the 11th time and their second-straight title, becoming the first team in Italy's history to complete Serie A and Coppa Italia doubles in back-to-back season; Juventus would go on to win another two consecutive doubles in 2016–17 and 2017–18.

Until the first Europa Conference League final in 2022, the club was the only team to have won all official confederation competitions and they have received, in addition to winning the three major UEFA competitions, the first case in the history of the European football and the only one to be reached with the same coach spell— The UEFA Plaque by the Union of European Football Associations (UEFA) on 12 July 1988.

Juventus was placed seventh in the FIFA's century ranking of the best clubs in the world on 23 December 2000 and nine years later was ranked second best club in Europe during the 20th Century based on a statistical study series by International Federation of Football History & Statistics, the highest for an Italian club in both.

Juventus have been proclaimed World's Club Team of the Year twice (1993 and 1996) and was ranked in 3rd place—the highest ranking of any Italian club—in the All-Time Club World Ranking (1991–2009 period) by the IFFHS. (Note: Additionally, since the 1990–91 season to the 2008–09 season, Juventus have won 15 official trophies: five Serie A titles, one Coppa Italia title, four Supercoppa Italiana titles, one Intercontinental Cup, one European Champions' Cup-UEFA Champions League, one UEFA Cup, one UEFA Intertoto Cup and one UEFA Super Cup.)

Juventus FC honours
Type	Competitions	Titles	Seasons
Domestic	Serie A	36	1905, 1925–26, (Note: Up until 1921, the top division of Italian football was the Federal Football Championship. Since then, it has been the First Division, the National Division and the Serie A.) 1930–31, 1931–32, 1932–33, 1933–34, 1934–35, 1949–50, 1951–52, 1957–58, 1959–60, 1960–61, 1966–67, 1971–72, 1972–73, 1974–75, 1976–77, 1977–78, 1980–81, 1981–82, 1983–84, 1985–86, 1994–95, 1996–97, 1997–98, 2001–02, 2002–03, 2011–12, 2012–13, 2013–14, 2014–15, 2015–16, 2016–17, 2017–18, 2018–19, 2019–20
Domestic	Serie B	1	2006–07
Domestic	Coppa Italia	15	1937–38, 1941–42, 1958–59, 1959–60, 1964–65, 1978–79, 1982–83, 1989–90, 1994–95, 2014–15, 2015–16, 2016–17, 2017–18, 2020–21, 2023–24
Domestic	Supercoppa Italiana	9	1995, 1997, 2002, 2003, 2012, 2013, 2015, 2018, 2020
Continental	European Cup / UEFA Champions League	2	1984–85, 1995–96
Continental	European Cup Winners' Cup	1	1983–84
Continental	UEFA Cup	3	1976–77, 1989–90, 1992–93
Continental	European Super Cup / UEFA Super Cup	2	1984, 1996
Continental	UEFA Intertoto Cup	1	1999
Worldwide	Intercontinental Cup	2	1985, 1996

- record
- ^{s} shared record

== Club statistics and records ==
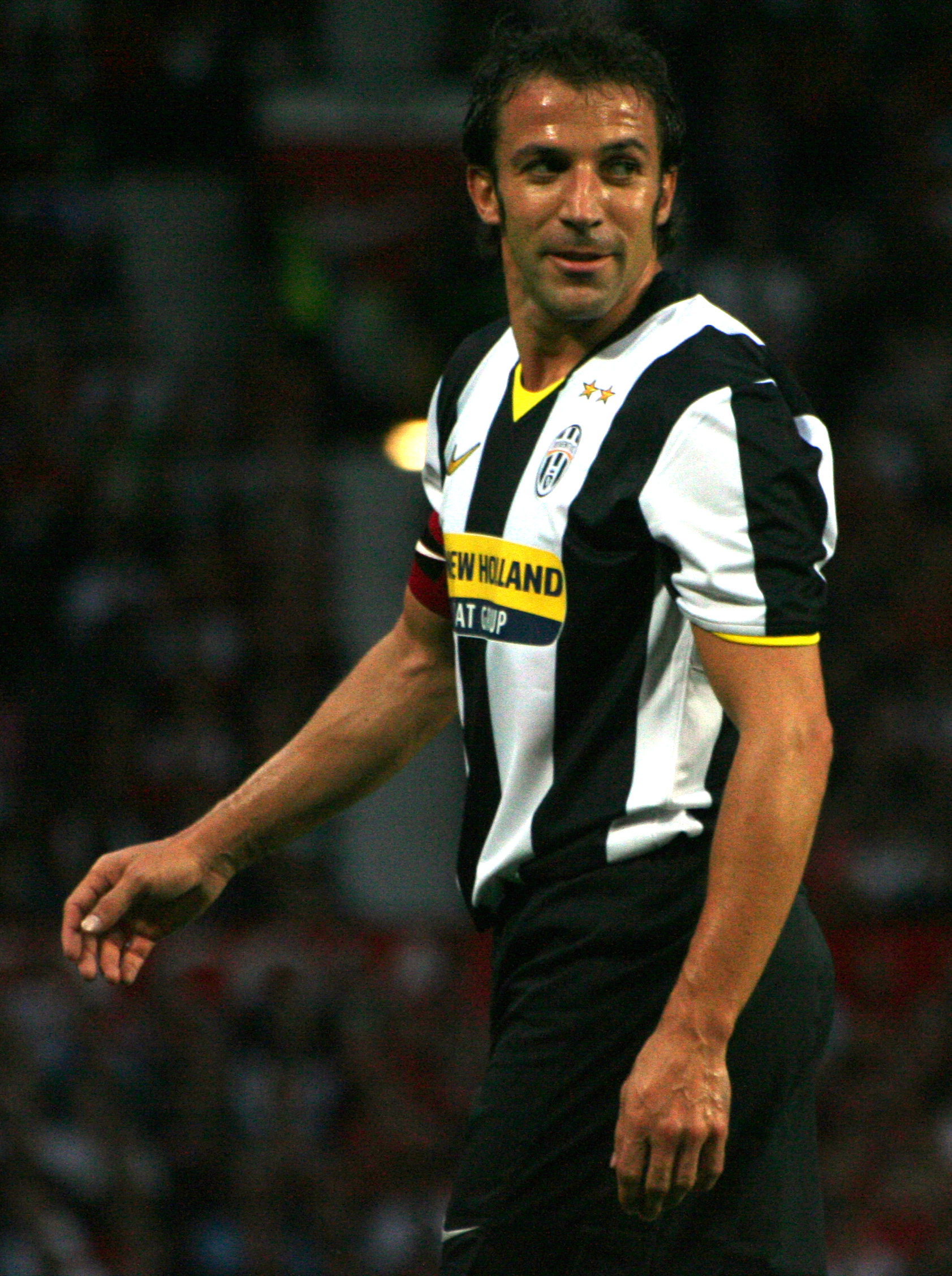
Alessandro Del Piero made a record 705 appearances for Juventus, including 478 in Serie A and is the all-time leading goalscorer for the club, with 290 goals.

Alessandro Del Piero holds Juventus's official appearance record of 705 appearances. He took over from Gaetano Scirea on 6 April 2008 against Palermo. He also holds the record for Serie A appearances with 478. Including all official competitions, Del Piero is the all-time leading goalscorer for Juventus, with 290—since joining the club in 1993. Giampiero Boniperti, who was the all-time topscorer since 1961 comes in second in all competitions with 182. In the 1933–34 season, Felice Borel scored 31 goals in 34 appearances, setting the club record for Serie A goals in a single season. Ferenc Hirzer is the club's highest scorer in a single season with 35 goals in 24 appearances in the 1925–26 season. The most goals scored by a player in a single match is 6, which is also an Italian record. This was achieved by Omar Sívori in a game against Inter in the 1960–61 season.

The first ever official game participated in by Juventus was in the Third Federal Football Championship, the predecessor of Serie A, against Torinese in a Juventus loss 0–1. The biggest victory recorded by Juventus was 15–0 against Cento, in the second round of the 1926–27 Coppa Italia. In the league, Fiorentina and Fiumana were famously on the end of Juventus's biggest championship wins, with both beaten 11–0 in the 1928–29 season. Juventus's heaviest championship defeats came during the 1911–12 and 1912–13 seasons: they were against Milan in 1912 (1–8) and Torino in 1913 (0–8).

The club occupies the sixth position at confederation level and the twelfth in the world for most confederation titles won with eleven trophies; and it is placed fourth in the all-time Union of European Football Associations (UEFA) ranking, (Note: As of June 2020, Union of European Football Associations (UEFA), based in its own coefficient's standard calculation procedure, what includes bonus points for any single competition phase reached by clubs since the round of 16 and, more generally, between any single competition; applies two points for each match won and one point for each point drawn in European Champions' Cup and Champions League, UEFA Cup and Europa League, UEFA Super Cup, Cup Winners' Cup, UEFA Intertoto Cup and Intercontinental Cup for historical-statistical purposes; not considering the introduction of three points for a match won at international level in 1994–95 season.) having obtained the highest coefficient score during seven seasons since its introduction in 1979, the most for an Italian team in both cases and joint second overall in the last cited. It was the first club to win all three major UEFA competitions and remained the only club to have won every official UEFA men's club tournament until the first 2022 Europa Conference League final. However, it is the solely club to have won six different official European competitions.

The signing of Gianluigi Buffon in 2001 from Parma cost Juventus €52 million (100 billion lire), making it the then-most expensive transfer for a goalkeeper of all-time until 2018. On 20 March 2016, Buffon set a new Serie A record for the longest period without conceding a goal (974 minutes) in the Derby della Mole during the 2015–16 season. On 26 July 2016, Argentine forward Gonzalo Higuaín became the third highest football transfer of all-time and highest ever transfer for an Italian club, at the time, when he was signed by Juventus for €90 million from Napoli. On 8 August 2016, Paul Pogba returned to his first club, Manchester United, for an all-time record for highest football transfer fee of €105 million, surpassing the former record holder Gareth Bale. The sale of Zinedine Zidane from Juventus to Real Madrid of Spain in 2001 was the world football transfer record at the time, costing the Spanish club around €77.5 million (150 billion lire). On 10 July 2018, Cristiano Ronaldo became the highest ever transfer for an Italian club with his €100 million transfer from Real Madrid.

== Contribution to the Italy national team ==
Overall, Juventus are the club that has contributed the most players to the Italy national team in history, being the only Italian club that has contributed players to every Italy national team since the 2nd FIFA World Cup. Juventus have contributed numerous players to Italy's World Cup campaigns, these successful periods principally have coincided with two golden ages of the Turin club's history, referred as Quinquennio d'Oro (The Golden Quinquennium), from 1931 until 1935, and Ciclo Leggendario (The Legendary Cycle), from 1972 to 1986. That contribution is mostly in official competitions—in almost uninterrupted way since 1924—who often formed the group that led the Azzurri squad to international success, most importantly in the 1934, 1982 and 2006 FIFA World Cups. The Italian media often called that massive contribution as Nazio-Juve in 1930s, Blocco-Juve in 1970s-1980s and Ital-Juve in 2010s.

Below are a list of Juventus players who represented the Italy national team during World Cup winning tournaments.

- 1934 FIFA World Cup (9): Gianpiero Combi, Virginio Rosetta, Luigi Bertolini, Felice Borel IIº, Umberto Caligaris, Giovanni Ferrari, Luis Monti, Raimundo Orsi and Mario Varglien Iº
- 1938 FIFA World Cup (2): Alfredo Foni and Pietro Rava
- 1982 FIFA World Cup (6): Dino Zoff, Antonio Cabrini, Claudio Gentile, Paolo Rossi, Gaetano Scirea and Marco Tardelli
- 2006 FIFA World Cup (5): Fabio Cannavaro, Gianluigi Buffon, Mauro Camoranesi, Alessandro Del Piero and Gianluca Zambrotta

Two Juventus players have won the golden boot award at the World Cup with Italy, Paolo Rossi in 1982 and Salvatore Schillaci in 1990. As well as contributing to Italy's World Cup winning sides, two Juventus players Alfredo Foni and Pietro Rava, represented Italy in the gold medal-winning squad at the 1936 Summer Olympics.

Seven Juventus players represented their nation during the 1968 European Championship win for Italy: Sandro Salvadore, Ernesto Càstano and Giancarlo Bercellino. and four in the UEFA Euro 2020: Giorgio Chiellini, Leonardo Bonucci, Federico Bernardeschi and Federico Chiesa; a national record.

The Turinese club has also contributed to a lesser degree to the national sides of other nations due to the limitations pre-Bosman rule (1995). Zinedine Zidane and captain Didier Deschamps were Juventus players when they won the 1998 World Cup with France, as well as Blaise Matuidi in the 2018 World Cup, and the Argentines Ángel Di María and Leandro Paredes in 2022, making it as the association football club which supplied the most FIFA World Cup winners globally (27). Three Juventus players have also won the European Championship with a nation other than Italy, Luis del Sol won it in 1964 with Spain, while the Frenchmen Michel Platini and Zidane won the competition in 1984 and 2000 respectively.

== Financial information ==
Juventus Football Club S.p.A.
- Type: Public (Società per azioni)
- Traded as: BIT: JUVE; LSE: 0H65
- Predecessor: Sport-Club Juventus (1897); Foot-Ball Club Juventus (1900); Juventus (1936); Juventus Cisitalia (1943); Juventus Football Club (1945)
- Founded: Turin, Italy (August 1949; 77 years ago, as società a responsabilità limitata)
Key people
Gianluca Ferrero	(President)
Maurizio Scanavino	(CEO)
Revenue
▼€480,711,754	(2020–21)
€573,424,092	(2019–20)
Operating income
▼€-197,194,261	(2020–21)
−67,060,716	(2019–20)
Net income
▼€-209.885.432	(2020–21)
−89,682,106	(2019–20)
Total assets
▼€907,811,109	(2020–21)
€1,176,876,224	(2019–20)
Total equity
▼€28,438,822	(2020–21)
€239.204.587	(2019–20)
Owner
Agnelli family (through EXOR N.V.)	65.4%
Tether Investments	11.5%
Lindsell Train Investment Fund	6.2%
Public floating	16.9%
- Number of employees: ▼870 (2020–21); 915 (2019–20)
- Website: juventus.com

Founded as an association, in 1923, during the Edoardo Agnelli presidency, the club, ruled by an assemblea di soci (membership assembly), became one of the first in the country to acquire professional status ante litteram, starting also the longest and most uninterrupted society in Italian sports history between a club and a private investor. Juventus was restructured as the football section of multisports parent company Juventus – Organizzazione Sportiva S.A. since the constitution of the later in that year to 1943, when it was merged with another three Turinese enterprises for founding the Compagnia Industriale Sportiva Italia (CISITALIA). In that twenty years Juventus progressive competed in different disciplines such as tennis, swimming, ice hockey, and bocce, gaining success in the first cited. After a long liquidation process of the automotive corporation started after the Italian Civil War (1945), all Juventus O.S.A. sections were closed with the exception of football and tennis, which were demerged. The football section, then called Juventus Cisitalia for sponsorship reasons, was renamed Juventus Football Club and the Agnelli family, which some members have held different executive charges inside the club for the past six years, obtained the club's majority shares after industrialist Piero Dusio, Cisitalia owner, transferred his shares in the ending of the decade. Juventus has been constituted as an independent società a responsabilità limitata (S.r.l.), a type of private limited company, in August 1949 and supervised by a consiglio d'amministrazione (board of directors) since then.

On 27 June 1967, the Turinese club changed its legal corporate status to società per azioni (S.p.A.) and on 3 December 2001 it became the third in the country to has been listed on the Borsa Italiana after Lazio and Roma; since that date until 19 September 2011, Juventus's listed shares took part of the Segmento Titoli con Alti Requisiti (STAR), one of the main market segment in the world. Since October 2016 to December 2018, and again since March 2020, The club's stock is included in the FTSE Italia Mid Cap stock market index of the Mercato Telematico Azionario (MTA); previously, between December 2018 and March 2020, it was included in the FTSE MIB index. The club has also a secondary listing on Borsa's sister stock exchange based in London.

The club becomes, in a nearly stable basis, one of the top-ten wealthiest in world football in terms of value, revenue and profit since the mid-1990s.

As of 29 October 2021, Juventus's shares are distributed between 63.8% to the Agnelli family through EXOR N.V., a holding part of the Giovanni Agnelli and C.S.a.p.a Group, 11.9% to Lindsell Train Investment Trust Ltd. and 24.3% distributed to other stakeholders (<3% each) though the Associazione Piccoli Azionisti della Juventus Football Club, created in 2010 and composed by more 40,000 affiliated, including investors as the Royal Bank of Scotland, the Norway Government Pension Fund Global, one sovereign wealth fund, the California Public Employees' Retirement System (CalPERS) and the financial firm BlackRock.

From 1 July 2008, the club has implemented a safety management system for employees and athletes in compliance with the requirements of international OHSAS 18001:2007 regulation and a Safety Management System in the medical sector according to the international ISO 9001:2000 resolution.

The club is one of the founding members of the European Club Association (ECA), which was formed after the merge of the G-14, an independent group of selected European clubs with international TV rights purposes, with the European Clubs Forum (ECF), a clubs' task force ruled by UEFA composed by 102 members, which Juventus was a founder and permanent member by sporting merits, respectively.

In 2022, Juventus was placed seventh in the global ranking drawn up by the British consultancy organisation Brand Finance in terms of brand power, where it was rated with a credit rating AAA ("extremely strong") with a score of 86.1 out of 100, as well as eleventh in terms of brand value (€705 million) and ninth by enterprise value (€2294 billion). All this made I Bianconeri, in 2015, the country's second sports club—first in football—after Scuderia Ferrari by brand equity.

It is ranked in the 12th place on Forbes' list of the most valuable football clubs at international level with an estimate value of US$2.40 billion (as of May 2026).

in May 2016, it became the first football club in the country to cross the billion euro mark.

According to the Deloitte Football Money League, a research published by consultants Deloitte Touche Tohmatsu in March 2022, Juventus is the ninth-highest earning football club in the world with an estimated revenue of €433.5 million as of 30 June 2021 and, in 2002, the club reached the second position overall, the highest-ever achieved for a Serie A team, a ranking which they retained for the following two years.

On 14 September 2020, Juventus officially announced that Raffles Family Office, a Hong Kong-based multi-family office would be the club's Regional Partner in Asia for the next three years.

Development of financial indicators
Season	2014–15	2015–16	2016–17	2017–18	2018–19	2019–20	2020–21	2021–22	2022–23	2023–24
Total revenue (€ mn.)	339	368	536	474	587	549	457	411	468	352
Net profit (€ mn.)	2	4	43	−19	−40	−90	−210	−239	−124	−199
Total assets (€ mn.)	474	578	847	773	942	1,180	908	932	834	679
Total equity (€ mn.)	45	53	94	72	31	239	28	165	42	40
Number of employees	627	304	832	800	885	915	870	906	1,098	1,085

=== Kit suppliers and shirt sponsors ===
Period	Kit manufacturer	Shirt sponsor (chest)	Shirt sponsor (back)	Shirt sponsor (sleeve)
1979–1989	Kappa	Ariston	—	—
1989–1992	Kappa	UPIM	—	—
1992–1995	Kappa	Danone	—	—
1995–1998	Kappa	Sony	—	—
1998–1999	Kappa	D+ (domestic); Tele+ (Europe)	—	—
1999–2000	Kappa	D+ (domestic league/cup away); CanalSatellite (domestic cup home); Sony (Europe)	—	—
2000–2001	Lotto	Tele+ (domestic league/cup home); Sportal.com (Europe/domestic cup away); CiaoWeb (domestic league/Europe)	—	—
2001–2002	Lotto	Fastweb (domestic league); Tu Mobile (domestic cup/Europe)	—	—
2002–2003	Lotto	Fastweb (domestic league); Tamoil (domestic cup/Europe)	—	—
2003–2004	Nike	Fastweb (domestic league); Tamoil (domestic cup/Europe)	—	—
2004–2005	Nike	Sky Sport (domestic league); Tamoil (domestic cup/Europe)	—	—
2005–2007	Nike	Tamoil	—	—
2007–2010	Nike	New Holland	—	—
2010–2012	Nike	Betclic (domestic home/Europe); Balocco (domestic away)	—	—
2012–2015	Nike	Jeep	—	—
2015–2017	Adidas	Jeep	—	—
2017–2022	Adidas	Jeep	Cygames	—
2022–2023	Adidas	Jeep	Cygames	Bitget
2023–2024	Adidas	Jeep	Cygames	Zondacrypto
2024–2025	Adidas	Save the Children	Cygames	Azimut
2025–	Adidas	Jeep Visit Detroit	Cygames	WhiteBIT

=== Kit deals ===
Kit supplier	Period	Contract announcement	Contract duration	Value	Notes
Adidas	2015–present	24 October 2013	2015–2019 (4 years)	€23.25 million per year	Original contract terms: Total €139.5 million / 2015–2021 (6 years); The contract was prematurely extended under improved terms at the end of the 2018–2019 season
Adidas	2015–present	21 December 2018	2019–2027 (8 years)	Total €408 million (€51 million per year)	
Adidas	2015–present	19 June 2025	2027–2037 (10 years)	Total €408 million (€40.8 million per year)	

== Media ==
The official anthem of Juventus is Juve (storia di un grande amore), or Juve (story of a great love) in English, written by Alessandra Torre and Claudio Guidetti, in the version of the singer and musician Paolo Belli composed in 2007.

In 2016, a documentary film called Black and White Stripes: The Juventus Story was produced by the La Villa brothers about Juventus. On 16 February 2018, the first three episodes of a docu-series called First Team: Juventus, which followed the club throughout the season, by spending time with the players behind the scenes both on and off the field, was released on Netflix; the other three episodes were released on 6 July 2018. On 25 November 2021, an eight-episode docu-series called All or Nothing: Juventus, which followed the club throughout the season, by spending time with the players behind the scenes both on and off the field, was released on Amazon Prime.

== Multisport activities ==
The club had been involved in various sports activities at different times until the late 1970s. Initially, from its foundation until 1899, it had sections for cycling, athletics, wrestling, and running.

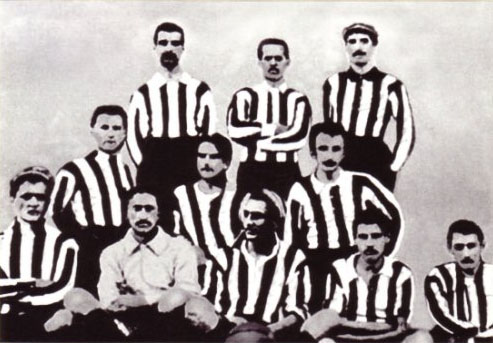
1905 Seconda Categoria winning team

In the early 20th century, Juventus had a second team, competing in Seconda Categoria. (Note: Not to be confused with the current Seconda Categoria, the eighth level of the Italian football league system) They obtained a second place in 1904 and a first place in 1905. Juventus II also took part in the Campionato De Martino, another league dedicated to reserve teams, until the competition ceased in 1976; they won the 1959–60 edition. Juventus even had a third team who played friendly matches against local teams in the 1900s, and also in the 1910s, and competed in the Terza Categoria in the first decades of the 20th century. (Note: Not to be confused with the current Terza Categoria, the ninth level of the Italian football league system)

In the early 1920s, Juventus expanded its sports involvement, led by President Edoardo Agnelli. This led to the creation of Juventus Organizzazione Sportiva Anonima, which participated in various national championships in disciplines such as bowls, swimming, ice hockey, and tennis until its dissolution after World War II, with tennis being the most successful. Juventus achieved its greatest successes with the tennis section. In the late 1960s, a skiing section named Sporting Club Juventus was established, based in Castagneto Po and active throughout the following decade.

In the 2017–18 season, Juventus established a women's football section with a team in the Serie A women's championship. The Women's team won the league in their debut season, mirroring the achievement of the men's team and becoming the first Italian club to hold both major national football championships, male and female, simultaneously. This success continued for the next five seasons. Juventus also became the first Italian club to found a reserve team since its reintroduction in 2018. Juventus U23—rechristened Juventus Next Gen in 2022—won a Coppa Italia Serie C in 2019–20, one year after its inception.

Since 2019, the club has had an eSports section. In 2021, the team won the eFootball.Pro, a prominent eSports competition for club teams worldwide. In the same year, they also claimed the TIMVISION Cup | eSports Edition, the first digital edition of the Italian Cup organized by the Lega Serie A. In 2023, under the name Juventus Dsyre – in collaboration with the eSports team of the same name – they secured their first Italian championship title in the eSerie A TIM, the virtual version of Serie A organized by the Lega Serie A.

== See also ==
- Dynasties in Italian football
- List of football clubs by competitive honours won
- List of football clubs in Italy by major honours won
- List of sports clubs inspired by others
- List of world champion football clubs

== Bibliography ==
=== Books ===
- Arpino, Giovanni; Bàrberi Squarotti, Giorgio; Romano, Massimo (1992). Opere (in Italian and Piedmontese). Milan: Rusconi Editore. ISBN 88-18-06084-8.
- Bainer, Alan; Magee, Jonathan; Tomlinson, Alan, eds. (2005). The Bountiful Game? Football Identities and Finances. Oxford: Meyer & Meyer Sport. ISBN 1-84126-178-5.
  - Dietschy, Paul; Mourat, Antoine. "The Motor Car and Football Industries from the early 1920s to the late 1940s: The Cases of FC Sochaux and Juventus". In Bainer, Magee & Tomlinson (2005).
- Canfari, Enrico (1915). Storia del Foot-Ball Club Juventus di Torino (in Italian). Tipografia Artale.
- Clark, Martin (1996) [1995]. Modern Italy; 1871–1995. Vol. 2. Milan: Longman. ISBN 0-582-05126-6.
- Dolci, Fabrizio; Janz, Oliver (2003). Non omnis moriar: gli opuscoli di necrologio per i caduti Italiani nella Grande Guerra; bibliografia analitica (in Italian). Edizioni di Storia e Letteratura. ISBN 88-8498-152-2.
- Glanville, Brian (2005). The Story of the World Cup. London: Faber and Faber. ISBN 0-571-22944-1.
- Goldblatt, David (2007). The Ball is Round: A Global History of Football. London: Penguin. ISBN 978-0-14-101582-8.
- Hazard, Patrick; Gould, David (2001). Fear and loathing in world football. Berg Publishers. ISBN 1-85973-463-4.
- Manzo, Luciana; Peirone, Fulvio, eds. (2006) [2005]. Sport a Torino. Luoghi, eventi e vicende tra Ottocento e Novecento nei documenti dell'Archivio Storico della Città (PDF) (in Italian). Archivio Storico Città di Torino. TO 01465329. Archived (PDF) from the original on 21 December 2016.
- Kuper, Simon; Szymanski, Stefan (2010). Calcionomica. Meraviglie, segreti e stranezze del calcio mondiale (in Italian). ISBN Edizioni. ISBN 978-88-7638-176-8.
- Papa, Antonio; Panico, Guido (1993). Storia sociale del calcio in Italia (in Italian). Bologna: Il Mulino. p. 271. ISBN 88-15-08764-8.
- Sappino, Marco (2000). Dizionario biografico enciclopedico di un secolo del calcio italiano (in Italian). Vol. 2. Milan: Baldini Castoldi Dalai Editore. ISBN 88-8089-862-0.
- Tranfaglia, Nicola; Zunino, Pier Giorgio (1998). Guida all'Italia contemporanea, 1861–1997 (in Italian). Vol. 4. Garzanti. ISBN 88-11-34204-X.
- Vieli, André (2014). UEFA: 60 years at the heart of football (PDF). Nyon: Union des Associations Européenes de Football. doi:10.22005/bcu.175315. Archived (PDF) from the original on 3 August 2021.

=== Other publications ===
- Graziano, Mirko (9 October 2011). "Azzurro Juve, miniera d'oro". La Gazzetta dello Sport (in Italian). Vol. 115, no. 237.
- Papi, Giacomo (8 April 2004). "Il ragazzo che portava il pallone". Diario della settimana (in Italian). Vol. 13/14.
- "Football Philosophers" (PDF). The Technician. 46. Union des Associations Européennes de Football (UEFA). May 2010. Archived (PDF) from the original on 13 July 2020.
- "Bilancio di sostenibilità 2015–16" (PDF) (in Italian). Juventus Football Club S.p.A. October 2016. Archived from the original (PDF) on 31 October 2016.
- "Prospetto informativo OPV 24 maggio 2007" (PDF) (in Italian). Commissione Nazionale per le Società e la Borsa (CONSOB). Archived from the original (PDF) on 10 April 2008.
- LI Osservatorio sul Capitale Sociale degli italiani – Il tifo calcistico in Italia (PDF) (Report) (in Italian). Demos & Pi. 15 September 2016. Archived (PDF) from the original on 22 October 2016.
- Brand Finance Football 50 2022 (PDF) (Report). Brand Finance plc. 24 May 2022.
