= Alfred Dick (entrepreneur) =

Swiss sports executive and entrepreneur (1865–1909)

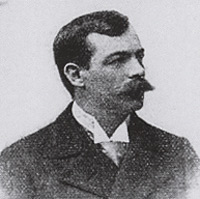
- Born: 12 April 1865; Yverdon-les-Bains, Switzerland
- Died: 10 August 1909 (aged 44); Turin, Italy
- Occupation: entrepreneur

Alfred Dick (Yverdon-les-Bains, 12 April 1865 – Turin 10 August 1909) was a Swiss sports executive and entrepreneur. He was the president of Foot-Ball Club Juventus and later the founder of Foot-Ball Club Torino.

== Biography ==
He was born in Switzerland and moved at a very early age to Turin. He was the manager of a leather and footwear company as well as a businessman with modern ideas but a difficult temperament and moody behaviour. Dick was the president of F.B.C. Juventus from 1905 to 1906, a period in which he was responsible for providing the Club with a consistent and solid organisational structure, for giving the first membership cards to the foreigners and for enabling the 'Bianconeri' players to train on a proper football field in the proximity of the Velodrome Umberto I, a completely different pitch compared to the one in Piazza d'Armi (until then used for such training purposes).

During his presidency, the formation of the football team from Piedmont won its first national title in 1905. The following year — in 1906 — when it came the time to vote for the renewal of the presidency, Dick was ousted by the board of directors of the White-Blacks. Consequently, as a result of this dismissal and because of the shift towards professionalism strived for by most of the Club's members, he sensationally left the Juventus Football Club. Followed in this decision by a group of dissidents, he then approached some of his fellow citizens — members of the F.B.C. Torinese — and co-founded the brand new F.B.C. Torino later that year.

Alfred Dick committed suicide with a gunshot at the age of 44 in August 1909.
