= 1905 Prima Categoria =

8th season of top-tier Italian football

Prima Categoria
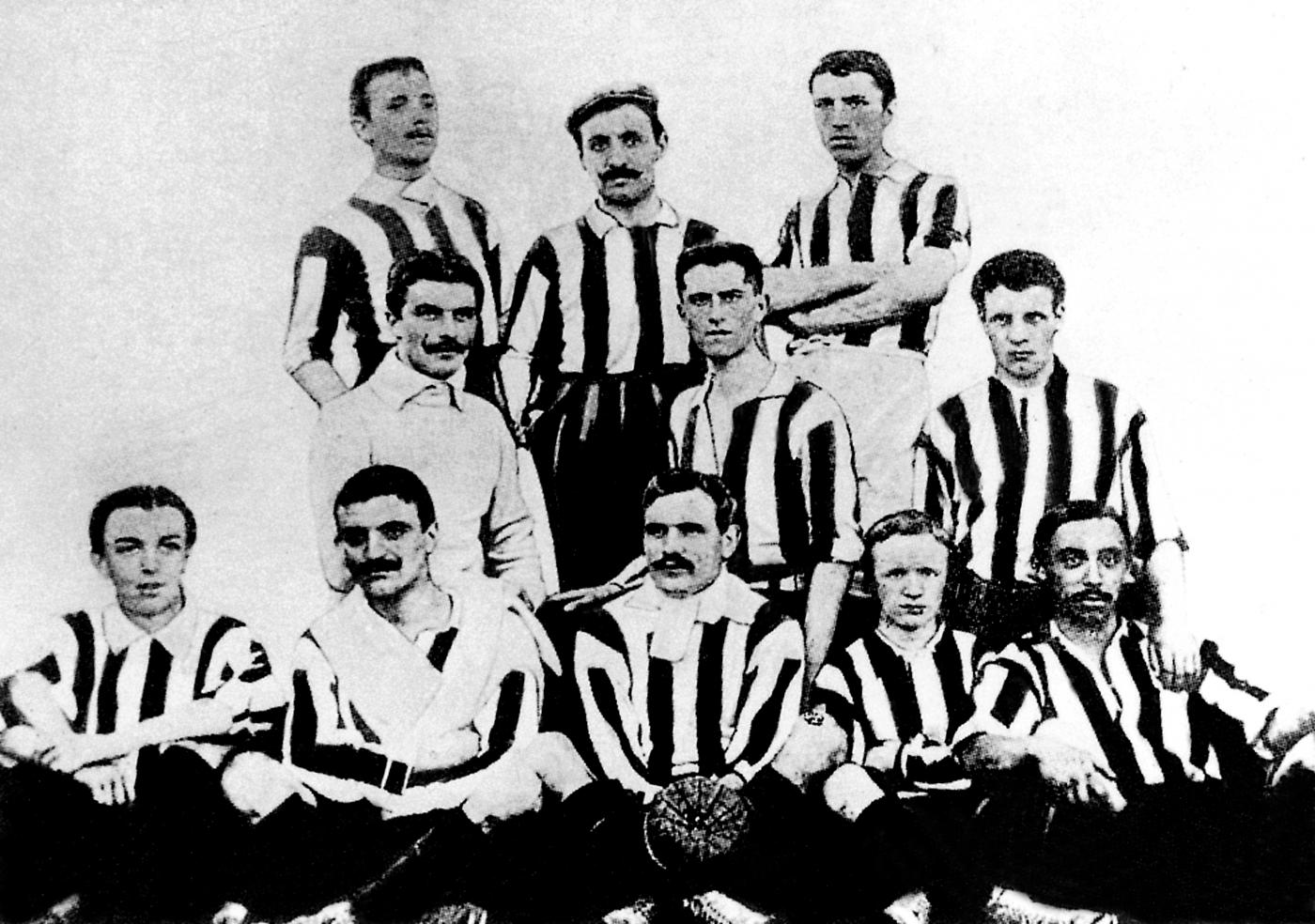
- Juventus FC, champion
- Season: 1904–05
- Champions: Juventus; 1st title

The 1905 Prima Categoria was the eighth edition of the Italian Football Championship and the second since the re-brand to Prima Categoria. The Italian football championship was won that year for the first time by Juventus.

== Regulation ==
Following the 1905 affiliation to FIFA, the Italian Football Federation implemented new regulations to its championship that year. The contest again contained 2 clubs from each of the 3 Northern Italian regions of Liguria, Lombardy and Piedmont. However, home and away matches replaced the previous one-leg format used in the regional games of the competition. The championship was then decided from a round robin contest of the 3 regional winners.

== Qualifications ==
=== Piedmont ===
Team 1	Agg.	Team 2	1st leg	2nd leg
Juventus	4-0	FBC Torinese	2-0	2-0

The results were decided after F.B.C. Torinese's forfeit.

=== Lombardy ===
Played on 12 February and 19 February

Team 1	Agg.	Team 2	1st leg	2nd leg
Milan	9-10	US Milanese	3-3	6-7

=== Liguria ===
Played on 5 February and 19 February

Team 1	Agg.	Team 2	1st leg	2nd leg
Andrea Doria	0-1	Genoa	0-0	0-1

== Final round ==
=== Final classification ===
Pos	Team	Pld	W	D	L	GF	GA	GD	Pts	Qualification
1	Juventus (C)	4	2	2	0	9	3	+6	6	Champions
2	Genoa	4	1	3	0	7	6	+1	5	
3	US Milanese	4	0	1	3	5	12	−7	1	

Source: Panini
(C) Champions

=== Results ===
Team 1	Score	Team 2
Juventus	3-0	US Milanese
Genoa	1-1	Juventus
US Milanese	2-3	Genoa
US Milanese	1-4	Juventus
Juventus	1-1	Genoa
Genoa	2-2	US Milanese

== References and sources ==
- Almanacco Illustrato del Calcio - La Storia 1898-2004, Panini Edizioni, Modena, September 2005
