= 1959–60 Juventus FC season =

Italian football club season

Juventus Football Club
1959–60 season
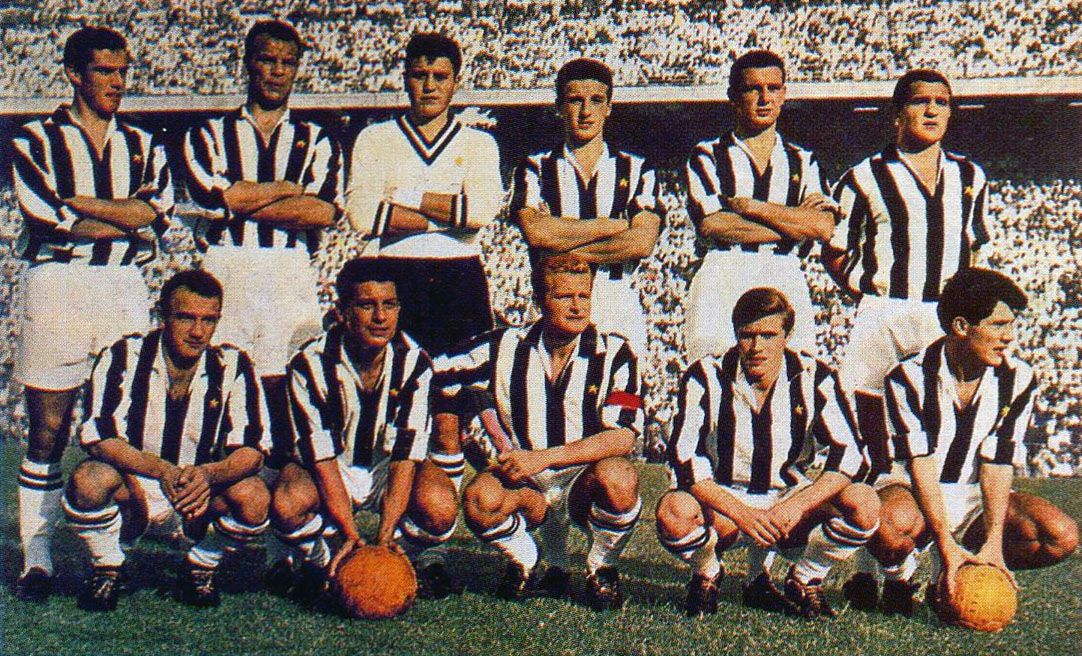
- Chairman: Umberto Agnelli
- Manager: Carlo Parola; Renato Cesarini (as technical director)
- Stadium: Stadio Comunale
- Serie A: 1st (in European Cup)
- Coppa Italia: Winners
- Friendship Cup: Winners
- Top goalscorer: Sívori (28)
Home colours	Away colours

During the 1959–60 season Juventus Football Club competed in Serie A, the Coppa Italia and the Friendship Cup.

== Summary ==
Juventus Football Club won the domestic title with a 7 points gap from runners-up Fiorentina, including a record of 92 goals scored.

The Double came along clinching the Coppa Italia. The match was played on 18 September 1960 between Juventus and Fiorentina. Juventus won 3–2; it was their fourth victory.

== Squad ==
Note: Flags indicate national team as defined under FIFA eligibility rules; some limited exceptions apply. Players may hold more than one non-FIFA nationality.

Pos.	Nation	Player
GK	ITA	Carlo Mattrel
GK	ITA	Giuseppe Vavassori
DF	ITA	Guglielmo Burelli
DF	ITA	Ernesto Castano
DF	ITA	Sergio Cervato
DF	ITA	Bruno Garzena
DF	ITA	Benito Sarti
MF	ITA	Umberto Colombo
MF	ITA	Flavio Emoli
MF	ITA	Gianfranco Leoncini
MF	ITA	Severino Lojodice

Pos.	Nation	Player
MF	ITA	Bruno Mazzia
MF	ITA	Antonio Montico
MF	ITA	Giorgio Rossano
FW	ITA	Giampiero Boniperti (Captain)
FW	WAL	John Charles
FW	ITA	Bruno Nicolè
FW	ITA	Ettore Ninni
FW	ARG	Omar Sívori
FW	ITA	Gino Stacchini

== Competitions ==
=== Serie A ===
==== League table ====
Pos	Team	Pld	W	D	L	GF	GA	GD	Pts	Qualification or relegation
1	Juventus (C)	34	25	5	4	92	33	+59	55	Qualified for the European Cup
2	Fiorentina	34	20	7	7	68	31	+37	47	Qualified for the Cup Winners' Cup
3	Milan	34	17	10	7	56	37	+19	44	
4	Internazionale	34	14	12	8	55	43	+12	40	Invited for the Inter-Cities Fairs Cup
5	Bologna	34	14	8	12	50	42	+8	36	

Source: Panini
(C) Champions

==== Matches ====
20 September 1959 1	Juventus	4–1	Lanerossi Vicenza	Turin
	Charles 30', 72'; Cervato 36'; Nicolè 65'	Report	81' Bonafin	Stadium: Comunale; Referee: Vittorio Cariani

27 September 1959 2	Padova	0–4	Juventus	Padua
		Report	6' Cervato; 85' Stacchini; 87' Stivanello; 89' (pen.) Sívori	Stadium: Stadio Silvio Appiani; Referee: Gennaro Marchese

4 October 1959 3	Juventus	3–1	SPAL	Turin
	Sívori 12'; Ganzer 21' (o.g.); Charles 41'	Report	51' Rossi	Stadium: Comunale; Referee: Adami

11 October 1959 4	Atalanta	2–2	Juventus	Bergamo
	Nova 7'; Ronzon 64'	Report	9' Sívori; 32' Boniperti	Stadium: Comunale; Referee: Moriconi

18 October 1959 5	Juventus	7–0	Alessandria	Turin
	Cervato 13'; Sívori 30', 64'; Charles 65', 85'; Stivanello 76'; Boniperti 88'	Report		Stadium: Comunale; Referee: Annoscia

25 October 1959 6	Lazio	0–2	Juventus	Rome
		Report	2' Nicolè; 80' Stacchini	Stadium: Stadio Olimpico; Referee: Raoul Righi

8 November 1959 7	Juventus	3–1	Fiorentina	Turin
	Nicolè 21'; Sívori 54', 67'	Report	3' Hamrin	Stadium: Comunale; Referee: Concetto Lo Bello

15 November 1959 8	Bologna	3–2	Juventus	Bologna
	Pivatelli 5' (pen.) 74'; Pascutti 30'	Report	3', 38' Charles	Stadium: Comunale; Referee: Vincenzo Orlandini

22 November 1959 9	Juventus	2–0	Genoa	Turin
	Colombo 75'; Nicolè 80'	Report		Stadium: Comunale; Referee: Giorgio Genel

6 December 1959 10	Napoli	2–1	Juventus	Naples
	Vitali 6'; Vinicio 63'	Report	89' (pen.) Cervato	Stadium: Stadio San Paolo; Referee: Jonni

13 December 1959 11	Juventus	1–0	Inter Milan	Turin
	Charles 28'	Report		Stadium: Comunale; Referee: Lo Bello

20 December 1959 12	Udinese	1–1	Juventus	Udine
	Menegotti 30'	Report	43' Stacchini	Stadium: Stadio Moretti; Referee: Angelini

27 December 1959 13	Juventus	4–0	Roma	Turin
	Sívori 24', 88'; Stacchini 75'; Boniperti 89'	Report		Stadium: Comunale; Referee: Leita

10 January 1960 14	Milan	0–2	Juventus	Milano
		Report	51' Stacchini; 74' Cervato	Stadium: San Siro; Referee: Giuseppe Adami

17 January 1960 15	Juventus	2–0	Bari	Turin
	Charles 12'; Stacchini 26'	Report		Stadium: Comunale; Referee: Antonio Sbardella

24 January 1960 16	Sampdoria	0–2	Juventus	Genoa
		Report	3', 81' Sívori	Stadium: Stadio Luigi Ferraris; Referee: Alfeo Grignani

31 January 1960 17	Juventus	2–1	Palermo	Turin
	Boniperti 3'; Colombo 40'	Report	24' Carpanesi	Stadium: Comunale; Referee: Fiorenzo Samani

7 February 1960 18	Lanerossi Vicenza	1–2	Juventus	Vicenza
	Bonafin 65'	Report	50' Charles; 60' Sívori	Stadium: Stadio Romeo Menti; Referee: Giuseppe Adami

21 February 1960 20	SPAL	3–6	Juventus	Ferrara
	Rossi 14', 57'; Massei 87'	Report	2', 48', 65' Charles; 19', 72' Sívori; 26' Leoncini	Stadium: Comunale; Referee: Gennaro Marchese

24 February 1960 19	Juventus	5–1	Padova	Turin
	Leoncini 11'; Charles 35'; Sívori 66' (pen.) 73', 81'	Report	75' (pen.) Tortul	Stadium: Comunale; Referee: Carlo Gambarotta

28 February 1960 21	Juventus	0–1	Atalanta	Turin
		Report	53' Zavaglio	Stadium: Comunale; Referee: Pietro Leita

6 March 1960 22	Alessandria	0–2	Juventus	Alessandria
		Report	24' Nicolè; 52' Charles	Stadium: Stadio Giuseppe Moccagatta; Referee: Cesare Jonni

20 March 1960 23	Juventus	2–0	Lazio	Turin
	Nicolè 3'; Charles 38'	Report		Stadium: Comunale; Referee: Roversi

27 March 1960 24	Fiorentina	1–0	Juventus	Florence
	Hamrin 15'	Report		Stadium: Comunale; Referee: Giuseppe Adami

3 April 1960 25	Juventus	3–0	Bologna	Turin
	Charles 30', 56'; Stacchini 51'	Report		Stadium: Comunale; Referee: Bruno De Marchi

10 April 1960 26	Genoa	2–6	Juventus	Genoa
	Abbadie 19'; Barison 78'	Report	41' Sívori; 49' Boniperti; 53', 67' Charles; 81', 87' Nicolè	Stadium: Stadio Luigi Ferraris; Referee: Cesare Jonni

17 April 1960 27	Juventus	4–2	Napoli	Turin
	Sívori 19', 20' (pen.) 67'; Charles 37'	Report	57' Di Giacomo; 82' Del Vecchio	Stadium: Comunale; Referee: Alfeo Grignani

24 April 1960 28	Inter	0–3	Juventus	Milano
		Report	31', 71' Sívori; 79' Boniperti	Stadium: Stadio San Siro; Referee: Vincenzo Orlandini

1 May 1960 29	Juventus	4–3	Udinese	Turin
	Stacchini 38'; Charles 39'; Sívori 58'; Colombo 78'	Report	16', 41' Bettini; 83' Milan	Stadium: Comunale; Referee: Silvio Ferrari

8 May 1960 30	Roma	2–2	Juventus	Rome
	Manfredini 1', 8'	Report	59' Sívori; 78' Charles	Stadium: Stadio Olimpico; Referee: Bruno De Marchi

15 May 1960 31	Juventus	3–1	Milan	Turin
	Sívori 55', 74'; Boniperti 81'	Report	56' Altafini	Stadium: Comunale; Referee: Iginio Rigato

22 May 1960 32	Bari	1–3	Juventus	Bari
	Erba 65'	Report	23' (o.g.) Tagnin; 51' Nicolè; 67' Lojodice	Stadium: Stadio della Vittoria; Referee: Cesare Jonni

29 May 1960 33	Juventus	2–2	Sampdoria	Turin
	Cervato 72' (pen.); Nicolè 84'	Report	4' Skoglund; 61' Cucchiaroni	Stadium: Comunale; Referee: Giorgio Genel

5 June 1960 34	Palermo	1–1	Juventus	Palermo
	Greatti 53'	Report	37' Sívori	Stadium: Stadio La Favorita; Referee: Cesare Jonni

=== Coppa Italia ===
==== Eightfinals ====
4 November 1959	Juventus	5–4 (a.e.t.)	Sampdoria	Turin
	Stacchini 19'; Sívori 32', 59'; Cervato 35' (pen.); Nicolè 106'		15', 52' Skoglund; 74' (pen.) Milani; 90' Mora	Stadium: Comunale; Referee: Giulio Campanati

==== Quarterfinals ====
6 April 1960	Atalanta	2–2 (a.e.t.) (6–6 p)	Juventus	Bergamo
	Olivieri 50'; Marchesi 72' (pen.)		18' Sívori; 43' Colombo	Stadium: Stadio Comunale; Referee: Genel
	Penalties
	Marchesi (penalty scored) (penalty scored) (penalty scored) (penalty scored) (penalty scored) (penalty scored)		(penalty scored) (penalty scored) (penalty scored) (penalty scored) (penalty scored) (penalty scored) Montico
Note: Juventus qualify after drawing lots

==== Semifinals ====
18 June 1960	Juventus	3–0	Lazio	Turin
	Cervato 43' (pen.); Lojodice 46'; Charles 55'			Stadium: Comunale; Referee: Gambarotta

==== Final ====
18 September 1960	Juventus	3–2 (a.e.t.)	Fiorentina	Milano
	Charles 10', 73'; Micheli 98' (o.g.)		45' Montuori; 61' da Costa	Stadium: Stadio San Siro; Referee: Raoul Righi

== Statistics ==
=== Goalscorers ===
32 goals

- (Argentina) (Italy) Omar Sívori

29 goals

- (Wales) John Charles

11 goals

- (Italy) Bruno Nicolè

9 goals

- (Italy) Gino Stacchini

8 goals

- (Italy) Sergio Cervato

7 goals

- (Italy) Giampiero Boniperti

5 goals

- (Italy) Umberto Colombo

3 goals

- (Italy) Severino Lojodice

2 goals

- (Italy) Gianfranco Leoncini
- (Italy) Giorgio Stivanello

== See also ==
- l'Unità, 1959 and 1960.
- La Stampa, 1959 and 1960.
