= 1960–61 Juventus FC season =

Italian football club season

Juventus Football Club
1960–61 season
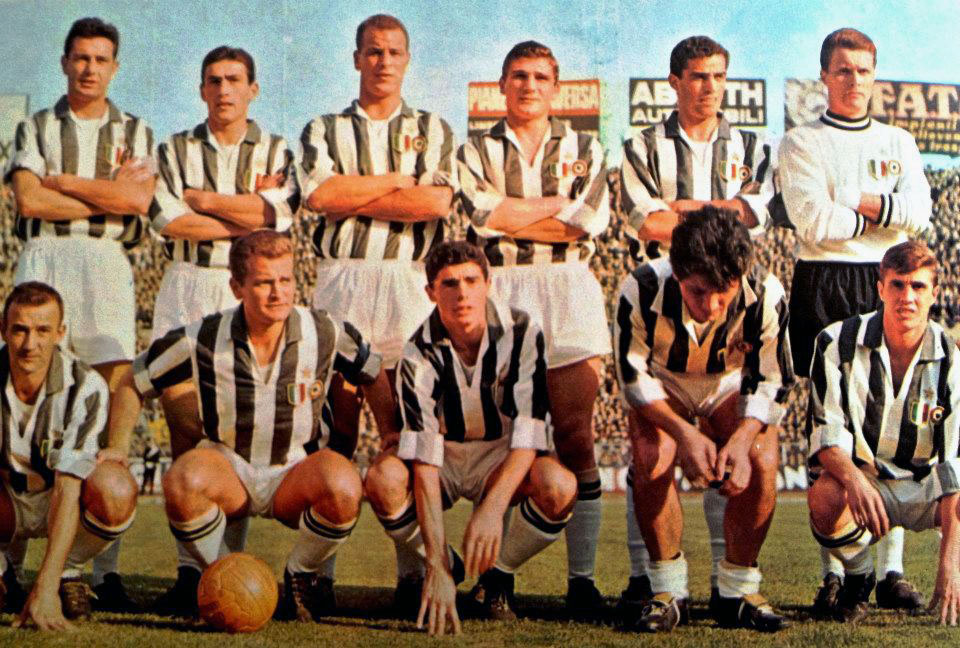
- Chairman: Umberto Agnelli
- Manager: Carlo Parola
- Stadium: Stadio Comunale
- Serie A: 1st (in European Cup)
- Coppa Italia: Semi-finals
- European Cup: Preliminary round
- Top goalscorer: Sívori (25)
| Home colours | Away colours |

During the 1960–61 season Juventus Football Club competed in Serie A, the Coppa Italia and the European Cup.

== Summary ==
Juventus clinched the domestic title for the second year in a row.

== Squad ==
Note: Flags indicate national team as defined under FIFA eligibility rules; some limited exceptions apply. Players may hold more than one non-FIFA nationality.

| Pos. | Nation | Player |
|---|---|---|
| GK | ITA | Luigi Ferrero |
| GK | ITA | Carlo Mattrel |
| GK | ITA | Giovanni Romano |
| GK | ITA | Giuseppe Vavassori |
| DF | ITA | Galeazzo Bello |
| DF | ITA | Guglielmo Burelli |
| DF | ITA | Tarcisio Burgnich |
| DF | ITA | Ernesto Càstano |
| DF | ITA | Sergio Cervato |
| DF | ITA | Gianfranco Leoncini |
| DF | ITA | Benito Sarti |
| MF | ITA | Umberto Colombo |
| MF | ITA | Flavio Emoli |

| Pos. | Nation | Player |
|---|---|---|
| MF | ITA | Eugenio Fascetti |
| MF | ITA | Severino Lojodice |
| MF | ITA | Bruno Mazzia |
| MF | ITA | Bruno Mora |
| FW | ITA | Bruno Nicolè |
| MF | ITA | Gino Stacchini |
| MF | ITA | Giorgio Stivanello |
| FW | ITA | Giampiero Boniperti (Captain) |
| FW | WAL | John Charles |
| FW | ARG | Omar Sívori |
| FW | ITA | Angelo Caroli |
| FW | ITA | Dario Cavallito |

== Competitions ==
=== Serie A ===
==== League table ====
| Pos | Team | Pld | W | D | L | GF | GA | GD | Pts | Qualification or relegation |
|---|---|---|---|---|---|---|---|---|---|---|
| 1 | Juventus (C) | 34 | 22 | 5 | 7 | 80 | 42 | +38 | 49 | Qualified for the European Cup |
| 2 | Milan | 34 | 18 | 9 | 7 | 65 | 39 | +26 | 45 | Invited for the Inter-Cities Fairs Cup |
| 3 | Internazionale | 34 | 18 | 8 | 8 | 73 | 39 | +34 | 44 | Invited for the Inter-Cities Fairs Cup |
| 4 | Sampdoria | 34 | 17 | 7 | 10 | 54 | 51 | +3 | 41 | |
| 5 | Roma (Note: Roma qualified as holders.) | 34 | 16 | 7 | 11 | 58 | 46 | +12 | 39 | Invited for the Inter-Cities Fairs Cup |

Source: Panini
(C) Champions

==== Matches ====
| 25 September 1960 1 | Udinese | 0–1 | Juventus | Udine |
| | | | 65' Colombo | Stadium: Stadio Moretti; Referee: Carlo Gambarotta |

| 2 October 1960 2 | Juventus | 3–1 | Lazio | Turin |
| | Emoli 4'; Charles 50'; Nicolè 51' | | 86' Ferrario | Stadium: Comunale; Referee: Bruno De Marchi |

| 9 October 1960 3 | SPAL | 1–2 | Juventus | Ferrara |
| | Corelli 7' | | 34' Boniperti; 51' Nicolè | Stadium: Stadio Comunale; Referee: Francescon |

| 16 October 1960 4 | Juventus | 4–1 | Catania Calcio | Turin |
| | Nicolè 15', 70'; Stacchini 58'; Boniperti 80' | | 23' Macor | Stadium: Comunale; Referee: Mario Butti |

| 23 October 1960 5 | Fiorentina | 3–0 | Juventus | Florence |
| | Milan 12'; Hamrin 43'; Montuori 69' | | | Stadium: Comunale; Referee: Iginio Rigato |

| 6 November 1960 6 | Juventus | 3–4 | Milan | Turin |
| | Sívori 56'; Charles 69'; Mora 82' | | 1', 50' Altafini; 9' Vernazza; 59' Rivera | Stadium: Comunale; Referee: Cesare Jonni |

| 13 November 1960 7 | Torino | 0–0 | Juventus | Turin |
| | | | | Stadium: Stadio Filadelfia; Referee: Francesco Francescon |

| 20 November 1960 8 | Juventus | 3–0 | Bologna | Turin |
| | Nicolè 2'; Charles 28', 43' | | | Stadium: Comunale; Referee: Gennaro Marchese |

| 27 November 1960 9 | Roma | 2–1 | Juventus | Rome |
| | Lojacono 61'; Manfredini 72' | | 78' (pen.) Cervato | Stadium: Stadio Olimpico; Referee: Iginio Rigato |

| 4 December 1960 10 | Juventus | 2–0 | Lanerossi | Turin |
| | Nicolè 31'; Puia 35' (o.g.) | | | Stadium: Comunale; Referee: Carlo Babini |

| 18 December 1960 11 | Inter | 3–1 | Juventus | Milan |
| | Corso 28'; Morbello 50'; Firmani 69' | | 77' Mora | Stadium: San Siro; Referee: Giuseppe Adami |

| 25 December 1960 12 | Juventus | 3–2 | Sampdoria | Turin |
| | Charles 22'; Sívori 24'; Mora 25' (pen.) | | 57', 64' Brighenti | Stadium: Comunale; Referee: Francesco Francescon |

| 1 January 1961 13 | Lecce | 2–2 | Juventus | Lecce |
| | Duzioni 45'; Gilardoni 53' | | 26' Nicolè; 36' Boniperti | Stadium: Mario Rigamonti; Referee: Carlo Gambarotta |

| 8 January 1961 14 | Atalanta | 2–2 | Juventus | Bergamo |
| | Nova 4'; Angelo Longoni 37' | | 40' (pen.) 51' Sívori | Stadium: Comunale; Referee: Antonio Di Tonno |

| 15 January 1961 15 | Juventus | 2–2 | Napoli | Turin |
| | Mora 9' (pen.); Charles 63' | | 16' Postiglione; 76' Tacchi | Stadium: Comunale; Referee: Bruno De Marchi |

| 22 January 1961 16 | Juventus | 2–1 | Padova | Turin |
| | Nicolè 26', 34' | | 27' Milani | Stadium: Comunale; Referee: Giulio Campanati |

| 29 January 1961 17 | Bari | 0–1 | Juventus | Bari |
| | | | 85' Charles | Stadium: Stadio della Vittoria; Referee: Concetto Lo Bello |

| 5 February 1961 18 | Juventus | 5–1 | Udinese | Turin |
| | Sívori 1', 32', 63'; Mora 61', 89' | | 81' Pentrelli | Stadium: Comunale; Referee: Antonio Di Tonno |

| 12 February 1961 19 | Lazio | 1–4 | Juventus | Rome |
| | Rozzoni 61' | | 8' Sívori; 31', 85' Charles; 89' Mora | Stadium: Stadio Olimpico; Referee: Carlo Gambarotta |

| 19 February 1961 20 | Juventus | 1–0 | SPAL | Turin |
| | Charles 64' | | | Stadium: Comunale; Referee: Francesco Francescon |

| 26 February 1961 21 | Catania | 1–2 | Juventus | Catania |
| | Prenna 70' (pen.) | | 51' Stacchini; 60' Charles | Stadium: Stadio Cibali; Referee: Cesare Jonni |

| 5 March 1961 22 | Juventus | 3–0 | Fiorentina | Turin |
| | Charles 14'; Nicolè 22'; Marchesi 39' (o.g.) | | | Stadium: Comunale; Referee: Iginio Rigato |

| 12 March 1961 23 | Milan | 3–1 | Juventus | Milan |
| | Colombo 14' (o.g.); Altafini 56'; Rivera 88' | | 9' (o.g.) Salvadore | Stadium: San Siro; Referee: Iginio Rigato |

| 19 March 1961 24 | Juventus | 1–0 | Torino | Turin |
| | Sívori 65' | | | Stadium: Comunale; Referee: Carlo Gambarotta |

| 26 March 1961 25 | Bologna | 2–4 | Juventus | Bologna |
| | Vinício 30', 74' | | 32', 69', 71' Sívori; 44' (pen.) Mora | Stadium: Stadio Renato Dall'Ara; Referee: Cesare Jonni |

| 2 April 1961 26 | Juventus | 3–0 | Roma | Turin |
| | Charles 27'; Boniperti 62'; Sívori 84' | | | Stadium: Comunale; Referee: Francesco Francescon |

| 9 April 1961 27 | Lanerossi | 0–1 | Juventus | Vicenza |
| | | | 9' Nicolè | Stadium: Stadio Romeo Menti; Referee: Giuseppe Adami |

| 30 April 1961 29 | Sampdoria | 3–2 | Juventus | Genoa |
| | Brighenti 28', 38'; Ocwirk 76' | | 18', 32' Sívori | Stadium: Stadio Luigi Ferraris; Referee: Bruno De Marchi |

| 7 May 1961 30 | Juventus | 4–2 | Lecce | Turin |
| | Charles 15', 50'; Sívori 64'; Nicolè 88' | | 8' Abbadie; 79' Arienti | Stadium: Comunale; Referee: Antonio Di Tonno |

| 14 May 1961 31 | Juventus | 3–2 | Atalanta | Turin |
| | Boniperti 26'; Mora 49', 50' | | 63' Veneri; 89' Maschio | Stadium: Comunale; Referee: Carlo Babini |

| 21 May 1961 32 | Napoli | 0–4 | Juventus | Naples |
| | | | 11', 45', 47' Sívori; 32' Boniperti | Stadium: Stadio San Paolo; Referee: Iginio Rigato |

| 30 May 1961 33 | Padova | 1–0 | Juventus | Padua |
| | Bacci 36' | | | Stadium: Stadio Silvio Appiani; Referee: Carlo Gambarotta |

| 4 June 1961 34 | Juventus | 1–1 | Bari | Turin |
| | Mora 27' (pen.) | | 72' De Robertis | Stadium: Comunale; Referee: Giuseppe Adami |

| 10 June 1961 28 | Juventus | 9–1 | Inter | Turin |
| | Sívori 11', 12', 17', 54', 67', 90' (pen.); Riefolo 52' (o.g.); Nicolè 64'; Mora 79' | | 78' Mazzola | Stadium: Comunale; Referee: Gambarotta |

=== Coppa Italia ===
==== Eightfinals ====
| 25 January 1961 | Sambenedettese | 1–4 | Juventus | San Benedetto del Tronto |
| | Rumignani 63' | | 2', 24' Sívori; 43' Charles; 78' (o.g.) Santoni | Stadium: Stadio Fratelli Ballarin; Referee: Cesare Jonni |

==== Quarterfinals ====
| 3 May 1961 | Sampdoria | 0–2 | Juventus | Genoa |
| | | | 11', 54' Nicolè | Stadium: Stadio Luigi Ferraris; Referee: Iginio Rigato |

==== Semifinals ====
| 10 May 1961 | Fiorentina | 3–1 | Juventus | Florence |
| | Milan 17'; Marchesi 51' da Costa 90' | | 23' Mora | Stadium: Comunale; Referee: Cesare Jonni |

==== 3rd place ====
| 29 June 1961 | Juventus | 2–2 (5–4 p) | Torino | Turin |
| | Cervato 20'; Cavallito 53' | | 20' Locatelli; 80' Mazzero | Stadium: Comunale; Referee: Bruno De Marchi |

=== European Cup ===
==== Round of 32 ====
| 21 September 1960 | Juventus (Italy) | 2–0 | (Bulgaria) CDNA Sofia | Turin |
| | Lojodice 5'; Sívori 24' | Report | | Stadium: Stadio Comunale; Attendance: 55,000; Referee: Dittmar Huber (Switzerland) |

| 12 October 1960 | CDNA Sofia (Bulgaria) | 4–1 (4–3 agg.) | (Italy) Juventus | Sofia |
| | Rakarov 19'; Kovachev 56'; Panayotov 68'; Tsanev 75' | Report | Nicolè 88' | Stadium: Vasil Levski National Stadium; Attendance: 50,000; Referee: Gottfried Dienst (Switzerland) |

== Statistics ==
=== Goalscorers ===
28 goals

- (Argentina) (Italy) Omar Sívori

16 goals

- (Wales) John Charles
- (Italy) Bruno Nicolè

13 goals

- (Italy) Bruno Mora

6 goals

- (Italy) Giampiero Boniperti

2 goals

- (Italy) Sergio Cervato
- (Italy) Gino Stacchini

1 goal

- (Italy) Dario Cavallito
- (Italy) Umberto Colombo
- (Italy) Flavio Emoli
- (Italy) Severino Lojodice
