= 1960 Coppa Italia final =

12th Coppa Italia final
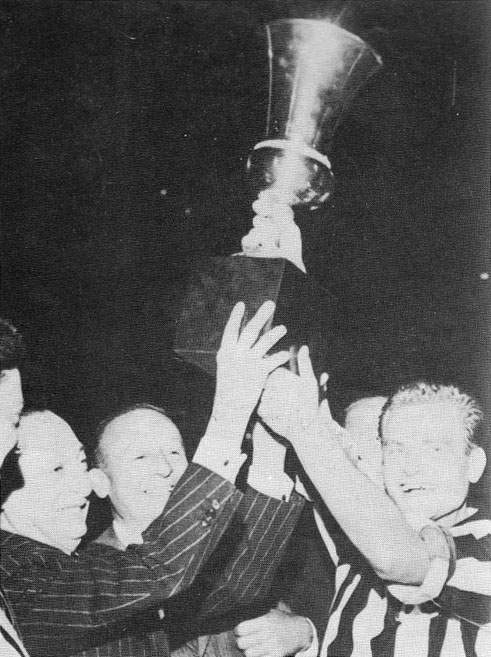
- Juventus captain Giampiero Boniperti (right) receives and raises the trophy of the 1959-60 Italian Cup.
- Event: 1959–60 Coppa Italia
Juventus	Fiorentina
3	2
- After extra time
- Date: 18 September 1960
- Venue: San Siro, Milan
- Referee: Raoul Righi
- Attendance: 70,000

The 1960 Coppa Italia final was the final of the 1959–60 Coppa Italia, the first one with the present day trophy and to give access to the Cup Winners Cup. The match was played on 18 September 1960 between Juventus and Fiorentina. Juventus won 3–2; it was their fourth victory.

== Match ==
18 September 1960
16:30

Juventus	3–2 (a.e.t.)	Fiorentina
Charles 10', 73'; Orzan 97' (o.g.)		Montuori 45'; Da Costa 60'

San Siro, Milan
Attendance: 70,000
Referee: Raoul Righi

Juventus	Fiorentina

GK	1	(Italy) Giuseppe Vavassori
DF	2	(Italy) Guglielmo Burelli
DF	3	(Italy) Benito Sarti
MF	4	(Italy) Sergio Cervato
MF	5	(Italy) Umberto Colombo
MF	6	(Italy) Flavio Emoli
RW	7	(Italy) Bruno Nicolè
FW	8	(Italy) Gino Stacchini
FW	9	(Wales) John Charles
FW	10	(Argentina) (Italy) Omar Sívori	(red card) 60'
LW	11	(Italy) Giampiero Boniperti
Manager:
(Italy) Carlo Parola

GK	1	(Italy) Giuliano Sarti
DF	2	(Italy) Sergio Castelletti
DF	3	(Italy) Enzo Robotti
MF	4	(Italy) Dante Micheli
MF	5	(Italy) Alberto Orzan
MF	6	(Italy) Rino Marchesi
RW	7	(Sweden) Kurt Hamrin
FW	8	(Argentina) (Italy) Miguel Montuori
AM	9	(Brazil) Dino da Costa
FW	10	(Italy) Luigi Milan
LW	11	(Italy) Gianfranco Petris
Manager:
(Hungarian People's Republic) Lajos Czeizler

== See also ==
- 1959–60 Juventus FC season
- ACF Fiorentina–Juventus FC rivalry
