= 1957–58 Juventus FC season =

Italian football club season

Juventus Football Club
1957–58 season
- Chairman: Umberto Agnelli
- Manager: Ljubiša Broćić
- Stadium: Comunale
- Serie A: 1st in (European Cup); 10th title
- Coppa Italia: Semi-finals
- Top goalscorer: Charles (28)
Home colours	Away colours

During the 1957–58 Juventus F.C. season, the club competed in both the Serie A and Coppa Italia.

== Summary ==
After three seasons of performance Juventus had a great season for the team clinching its 10th championship thanks to the "trio magico" with a Welsh forward John Charles in attacking along Omar Sivori from River Plate and Boniperti.

== Squad ==
Note: Flags indicate national team as defined under FIFA eligibility rules; some limited exceptions apply. Players may hold more than one non-FIFA nationality.

Pos.	Nation	Player
GK	ITA	Carlo Mattrel
GK	ITA	Giuseppe Vavassori
GK	ITA	Giovanni Viola
DF	ITA	Bruno Barbieri
DF	ITA	Benito Boldi
DF	ITA	Giuseppe Corradi
DF	ITA	Bruno Garzena
DF	ITA	Giuseppe Patrucco
MF	ITA	Umberto Colombo
MF	ITA	Flavio Emoli
DF	ITA	Rino Ferrario

Pos.	Nation	Player
MF	ITA	Antonio Montico
MF	ITA	Giorgio Turchi
FW	ITA	Giorgio Bartolini
FW	ITA	Giampiero Boniperti (Captain)
FW	WAL	John Charles
FW	ITA	Bruno Nicolè
FW	ITA	Guerrino Rossi
FW	ITA	Piergiorgio Sartore
FW	ARG	Omar Sívori
FW	ITA	Gino Stacchini
FW	ITA	Giorgio Stivanello

== Competitions ==
=== Serie A ===
==== League table ====
Pos	Team	Pld	W	D	L	GF	GA	GD	Pts	Qualification or relegation
1	Juventus (C)	34	23	5	6	77	44	+33	51	Qualification to European Cup
2	Fiorentina	34	16	11	7	56	36	+20	43	
3	Padova	34	16	10	8	55	42	+13	42	
4	Napoli	34	17	6	11	65	55	+10	40	
5	Roma	34	12	12	10	46	42	+4	36	

Source: Panini
(C) Champions

==== Matches ====
8 September 1957 1	Juventus	3–2	Hellas Verona	Turin
	Boniperti 11'; Sivori 28'; Charles 58'	Report	54' Maccacaro; 64' Bassetti	Stadium: Comunale; Referee: Francesco Guarnaschelli

15 September 1957 2	Udinese	0–1	Juventus	Udine
		Report	55' Charles	Stadium: Stadio Moretti; Referee: Cesare Jonni

22 September 1957 3	Juventus	3–2	Genoa	Turin
	Boniperti 32'; Sivori 73'; Charles 86'	Report	14' Corso; 15' Becattini	Stadium: Comunale; Referee: Lorenzo Menchini

29 September 1957 4	SPAL	0–1	Juventus	Ferrara
		Report	39' (pen.) Montico	Stadium: Comunale; Referee: Iginio Rigato

6 October 1957 5	Juventus	2–1	Padova	Turin
	Boniperti 30'; Stivanello 32'	Report	84' (pen.) Moro	Stadium: Comunale; Referee: Armando Marchetti

13 October 1957 6	Torino	0–1	Juventus	Turin
		Report	62' Charles	Stadium: Stadio Filadelfia; Referee: Cesare Jonni

20 October 1957 7	Milan	1–1	Juventus	Milan
	Bean 59'	Report	33' Sivori	Stadium: San Siro; Referee: (France) Lequesne

27 October 1957 8	Juventus	3–1	Inter	Turin
	Charles 4', 52'; Sivori 87'	Report	3' Lorenzi	Stadium: Comunale; Referee: Concetto Lo Bello

3 November 1957 9	Lanerossi	2–1	Juventus	Vicenza
	Campana 4'; Marchi 12'	Report	19' Sivori	Stadium: Stadio Romeo Menti; Referee: Raoul Righi

10 November 1957 10	Juventus	3–1	Lazio	Turin
	Charles 39'; Stacchini 44'; Sivori 86'	Report	49' (o.g.) Corradi	Stadium: Comunale; Referee: Giulio Campanati

17 November 1957 11	Bologna	3–4	Juventus	Bologna
	Pascutti 42'; Bodi 67' (pen.); Corradi 87' (o.g.)	Report	10' Nicolè; 46' Charles; 58' Stacchini; 59' Boniperti	Stadium: Comunale; Referee: Antonio Moriconi

24 November 1957 12	Juventus	1–3	Napoli	Turin
	Charles 47'	Report	10' Vinicio; 82' Novelli; 87' Di Giacomo	Stadium: Comunale; Referee: Vincenzo Orlandini

15 December 1957 13	Juventus	3–0	Atalanta	Turin
	Charles 35', 39', 85'	Report		Stadium: Comunale; Referee: Bruno De Marchi

22 December 1957 14	Fiorentina	2–1	Juventus	Florence
	Montuori 24'; Virgili 82'	Report	35' Charles	Stadium: Comunale; Referee: Concetto Lo Bello

29 December 1957 15	Juventus	4–1	Sampdoria	Turin
	Corradi 28' (pen.); Charles 60', 63', 72'	Report	82' Ocwirk	Stadium: Comunale; Referee: Luigi Grillo

5 January 1958 16	Alessandria	1–2	Juventus	Alessandria
	Castaldo 66'	Report	3' Sivori; 35' (o.g.) Pedroni	Stadium: Stadio Giuseppe Moccagatta; Referee: (Austria) Grill

12 January 1958 17	Roma	4–1	Juventus	Rome
	Griffith 3' (pen.); Lojodice 16', 88'; Da Costa 55'	Report	34' Boniperti	Stadium: Stadio Olimpico; Referee: Giulio Campanati

26 January 1958 18	Hellas Verona	2–3	Juventus	Verona
	Ghiandi 71'; Garzena 90' (o.g.)	Report	20' Sivori; 61' Charles; 78' Corradi	Stadium: Marcantonio Bentegodi; Referee: Cesare Jonni

2 February 1958 19	Juventus	2–0	Udinese	Turin
	Stacchini 19'; Sivori 35'	Report		Stadium: Comunale; Referee: Ettore Perego

9 February 1958 20	Genoa	1–3	Juventus	Genoa
	Leoni 85'	Report	12' Emoli; 37' Colombo; 49' Sivori	Stadium: Stadio Luigi Ferraris; Referee: Cesare Jonni

16 February 1958 21	Juventus	3–1	SPAL	Turin
	Boniperti 1'; Colombo 64'; Charles 74'	Report	22' Broccini	Stadium: Comunale; Referee: Fiorenzo Annoscia

23 February 1958 22	Padova	1–1	Juventus	Padua
	Rosa 39'	Report	79' Stacchini	Stadium: Stadio Silvio Appiani; Referee: Vincenzo Orlandini

2 March 1958 23	Juventus	4–1	Torino	Turin
	Sivori 9', 48'; Charles 60', 82'	Report	79' Ricagni	Stadium: Comunale; Referee: Concetto Lo Bello

9 March 1958 24	Juventus	1–0	Milan	Turin
	Charles 51' (pen.)	Report		Stadium: Comunale; Referee: Antonio Moriconi

16 March 1958 25	Inter	2–2	Juventus	Milan
	Lorenzi 5'; Vincenzi 48' (pen.)	Report	38' Sivori; 51' Charles	Stadium: Stadio San Siro; Referee: Gennaro Marchese

30 March 1958 26	Juventus	5–2	Lanerossi Vicenza	Turin
	Sivori 3', 7', 12', 80'; Charles 18'	Report	17' Campana; 23' Aronsson	Stadium: Comunale; Referee: Francesco Guarnaschelli

6 April 1958 27	Lazio	1–4	Juventus	Rome
	Selmosson 5'	Report	10', 13', 84' Charles; 60' Sivori	Stadium: Stadio Olimpico; Referee: Iginio Rigato

13 April 1958 28	Juventus	4–1	Bologna	Turin
	Sivori 25'; Charles 55'; Boniperti 76'; Stacchini 85'	Report	15' Bodi	Stadium: Comunale; Referee: Ettore Perego

20 April 1958 29	Napoli	4–3	Juventus	Naples
	Vinicio 4', 77'; Brugola 24'; Bertucco 88'	Report	6' (o.g.) Greco; 58' Stacchini; 86' Montico	Stadium: della Liberazione; Referee: Concetto Lo Bello

27 April 1958 30	Atalanta	0–0	Juventus	Bergamo
		Report		Stadium: Comunale; Referee: Iginio Rigato

4 May 1958 31	Juventus	0–0	Fiorentina	Turin
		Report		Stadium: Comunale; Referee: Vincenzo Orlandini

11 May 1958 32	Sampdoria	3–2	Juventus	Genoa
	Firmani 37'; Recagno 63'; Bolzoni 75'	Report	17', 35' Sivori	Stadium: Stadio Luigi Ferraris; Referee: (Austria) Steiner

18 May 1958 33	Juventus	2–1	Alessandria	Turin
	Montico 15'; Ferrario 82'	Report	43' Savioni	Stadium: Comunale; Referee: Severo Bartolomei

25 May 1958 34	Juventus	3–0	Roma	Turin
	Sivori 6'; Charles 41' (pen.); Boniperti 48'	Report		Stadium: Comunale; Referee: Grignani

=== Coppa Italia ===
==== Group 1 ====
Pos	Team	Pld	W	D	L	GF	GA	GD	Pts
1	Juventus	6	5	1	0	16	6	+10	11
2	Torino	6	3	1	2	13	6	+7	7
3	Biellese	6	1	1	4	9	14	−5	3
4	Pro Vercelli	6	1	1	4	4	16	−12	3

===== Matches =====
8 June 1958 1	Pro Vercelli	1–1	Juventus	Vercelli
16:45 CET	Ciocchetti 53' (pen.)		59' Stivanello	Stadium: Robbiano; Attendance: 3 000; Referee: Boati

15 June 1958 2	Biellese	2–4	Juventus	Biella
16:45 CET	Vizia 51'; Francescon 52' (pen.)		21', 72' Sívori; 27' Voltolina; 46' Stivanello	Stadium: La Marmora; Attendance: 4 000; Referee: Grignani

22 June 1958 3	Juventus	2–0	Torino	Turin
21:15 CET	Stacchini 68'; Montico 89' (pen.)			Stadium: Comunale; Referee: Righi

29 June 1958 4	Juventus	4–1	Pro Vercelli	Turin
21:15 CET	Sívori 16', 75'; Charles 61'; Nicolè 77'		78' Pensotti	Stadium: Comunale; Attendance: 3 000; Referee: Cerutti

6 July 1958 5	Juventus	3–1	Biellese	Turin
21:30 CET	Sartore 15'; Sívori 60', 61'		90' Piccioni	Stadium: Comunale; Referee: Guidi

13 July 1958 6	Torino	1–2	Juventus	Turin
18:00 CET	Petris 23'		46' Boniperti; 84' (pen.) Montico	Stadium: Stadio Filadelfia; Attendance: 13 000; Referee: Liverani

==== Quarterfinals ====
7 September 1958	Sampdoria	2–3 (a.e.t.)	Juventus	Genoa
16:30 CET	Recagno 15'; Bolzoni 72'		40' (pen.) Emoli; 57' Sívori; 114' (o.g.) Bergamaschi	Stadium: Luigi Ferraris; Referee: Moriconi

==== Semifinals ====
14 September 1958	SS Lazio	2–0	Juventus	Rome
21:30 CET	Tozzi 55'; Fumagalli 75'			Stadium: Olimpico; Referee: Lo Bello

==== Third place ====
15 October 1958	Juventus	3–3 (a.e.t.) (4–4 p)	Bologna	Turin
18:30 CET	Sívori 50' (pen.), 97'; Nicolè 65'		26' Pivatelli; 42' Perani; 98' Bonafin	Stadium: Comunale; Referee: Gambarotta
	Penalties
	Sívori (penalty missed) Sívori; Sívori; Sívori; Sívori (penalty missed) Voltolina		Bodi Bodi; Bodi; (penalty missed) Bodi; Bodi (penalty missed) Bodi
Note: Bologna won the match after a coin toss.

== Statistics ==
=== Squad statistics ===
Competitions	Points	Home						Away						Total						GD
Competitions	Points	G	W	D	L	Gs	Ga	G	W	D	L	Gs	Ga	G	W	D	L	Gs	Ga	GD
Serie A	51	17	15	1	1	46	17	17	8	4	5	31	27	34	23	5	6	77	44	+33
Coppa Italia	11	4	3	1	0	12	5	5	3	1	1	10	8	9	6	2	1	22	13	+9
Total	–	21	18	2	1	58	22	22	11	5	6	41	35	43	29	7	7	99	57	+42

==== Goalscorers ====
31 goals

- (Argentina) (Italy) Omar Sívori

29 goals

- (Wales) John Charles

9 goals

- (Italy) Giampiero Boniperti

7 goals

- (Italy) Gino Stacchini

5 goals

- (Italy) Antonio Montico

3 goals

- (Italy) Bruno Nicolè
- (Italy) Giorgio Stivanello

2 goals

- (Italy) Umberto Colombo
- (Italy) Giuseppe Corradi
- (Italy) Flavio Emoli

1 goal

- (Italy) Rino Ferrario
- (Italy) Piergiorgio Sartore
- (Italy) Romano Voltolina
