= Lojodice =

Lojodice is an Italian surname. Notable people with the surname include:

- Giuliana Lojodice (born 1940), Italian former stage, television and film actress
- Severino Lojodice (1933–2023), retired Italian professional footballer
