= Bruno Nicolè =

Italian footballer (1940–2019)

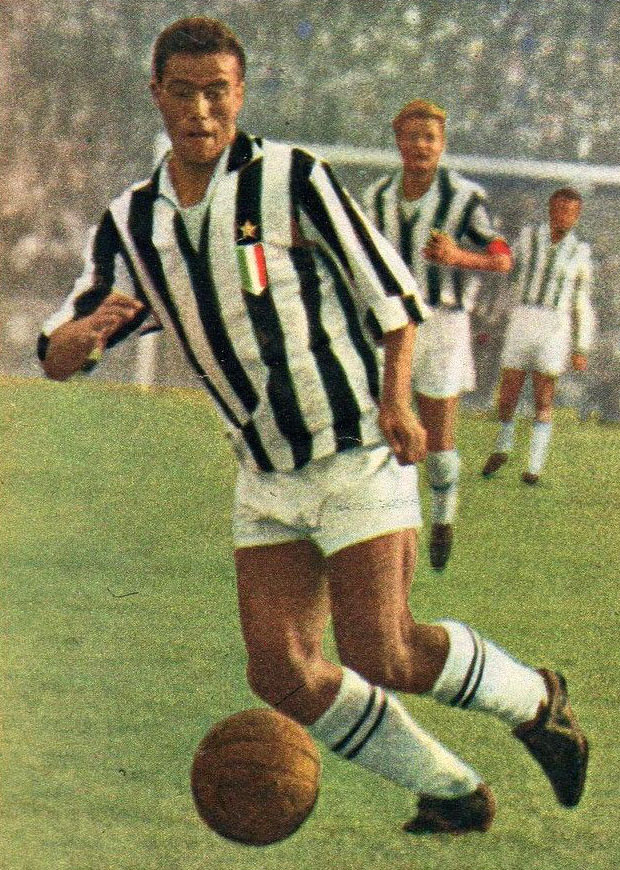
- Nicolè in action with Juventus in 1958

Personal information
- Date of birth: 24 February 1940
- Place of birth: Padua, Italy
- Date of death: 26 November 2019 (aged 79)
- Place of death: Pordenone, Italy
- Height: 1.80 m (5 ft 11 in)
- Position: Forward

Senior career*
Years	Team	Apps	(Gls)
1956–1957	Padova	12	(2)
1957–1963	Juventus	141	(47)
1963–1964	Mantova	19	(2)
1964–1965	Roma	13	(2)
1965	Sampdoria	8	(0)
1965–1967	Alessandria	24	(4)
Total		217	(57)

International career
1958–1964	Italy	8	(2)
- * Club domestic league appearances and goals

Bruno Nicolè (Italian pronunciation: [ˈbruːno nikoˈlɛ]; 24 February 1940 – 26 November 2019) was an Italian professional footballer who played as a forward.

== Club career ==
Throughout his club career, Nicolè played for several Italian clubs, and started his career with Padova at the age of 16, making his Serie A debut on 10 February 1957, in a 3–2 home win over Inter; his performances earned him a move to Juventus in 1957, where he won three Serie A titles and two Coppa Italia titles, also managing a goalscoring ratio of at least one goal every three games with the club, and even playing alongside the club's established attacking trio, which was made up of stars John Charles, Omar Sívori and Giampiero Boniperti. He later played for Mantova, Roma – where he won his third Coppa Italia in 1964, scoring the only goal in the second leg of the final victory over Torino (in a 1–0 aggregate win) – and Sampdoria, before ending his career in 1967, after two seasons in Serie B with Alessandria.

== International career ==
Nicolè made 8 appearances for the Italy national football team between 1958 and 1964, scoring two goals. He made his international debut on 9 November 1958, in a 2–2 friendly draw away against France at the Stade Olympique Yves-du-Manoir in Colombes, near Paris, and scored both of Italy's goals during the match, his only international goals. At the age of 18 years and 258 days, he was the youngest goalscorer for the Italy national football team before being succeeded by Wilfried Gnonto, and also holds the record for being Italy's youngest ever captain, at the age of 21 years and 61 days, when he wore the armband in Italy's 3–2 friendly win in Bologna over Northern Ireland on 25 April 1961. His final appearance for Italy came in a 3–1 friendly home win over Denmark on 5 December 1964.

== Style of play ==
A versatile forward, who was capable of playing in several positions along the front line, Nicolè usually played as a central striker, or in a more withdrawn position as a winger, due to his ability to both score or set-up goals. A talented and creative player, with an imposing physique and an eye for goal, he was known for his dribbling skills, speed, and accurate shot. A precocious talent, despite his ability and emergence at an early age, he often struggled with injuries throughout his career, which, coupled with his tendency to gain weight during his periods of inactivity, led to an early physical decline, which eventually forced him to retire prematurely at the age of 27.

== After retirement ==
Following his retirement from professional football at the age of 27, Nicolè worked as a physical education teacher.

Nicolè died on 26 November 2019.

== Honours ==
Juventus

- Serie A champion: 1957–58, 1959–60, 1960–61.
- Coppa Italia winner: 1958–59, 1959–60.
- Coppa delle Alpi winner: 1963.

Roma

- Coppa Italia winner: 1963–64.
