= Umberto Colombo (footballer) =

Italian footballer (1933–2021)

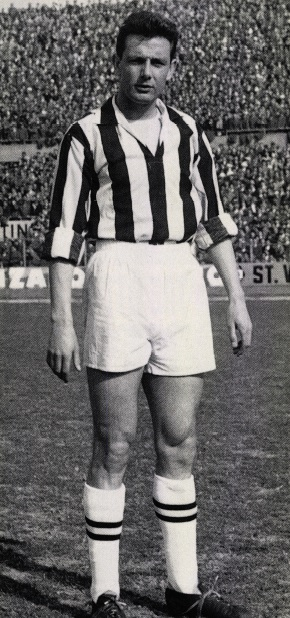
- Umberto Colombo with Juventus in the 1957–58 season

Personal information
- Date of birth: 21 May 1933
- Place of birth: Como, Kingdom of Italy
- Date of death: 26 October 2021 (aged 88)
- Height: 1.83 m (6 ft 0 in)
- Position: Midfielder

Senior career*
Years	Team	Apps	(Gls)
1950–1952	Juventus	0	(0)
1952–1954	Monza	48	(10)
1954–1961	Juventus	173	(22)
1961–1966	Atalanta	142	(3)
1966–1967	Verona	4	(0)
Total		367	(35)

International career
1959–1960	Italy	3	(0)
- * Club domestic league appearances and goals

Umberto Colombo (Italian pronunciation: [umˈbɛrto koˈlombo]; 21 May 1933 – 26 October 2021) was an Italian professional footballer who played as a midfielder.

== Honours ==
Juventus

- Serie A: 1957–58, 1959–60, 1960–61

Atalanta

- Coppa Italia: 1962–63
