= Giuseppe Vavassori =

Italian footballer (1934–1983)

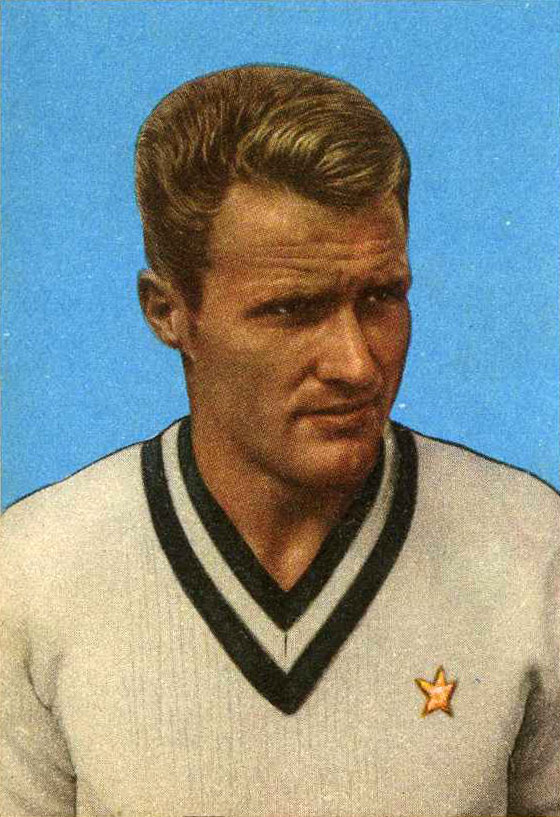
- Vavassori with Juventus in 1959

Personal information
- Date of birth: 29 June 1934
- Place of birth: Rivoli, Kingdom of Italy
- Date of death: 21 November 1983 (aged 49)
- Place of death: Bologna, Italy
- Height: 1.82 m (5 ft 11 1/2 in)
- Position: Goalkeeper

Senior career*
| Years | Team | Apps | (Gls) |
| 1954–1961 | Juventus | 71 | (0) |
| 1954–1955 | → Carrarese (loan) | 32 | (0) |
| 1961–1966 | Catania | 158 | (0) |
| 1966–1972 | Bologna | 113 | (0) |

International career
| 1961 | Italy | 1 | (0) |
- * Club domestic league appearances and goals

Giuseppe Vavassori (Italian pronunciation: [dʒuˈzɛppe vavasˈsoːri]; 29 June 1934 – 21 November 1983) was an Italian professional footballer who played as a goalkeeper.

After his death, a stadium in his native town of Rivoli was named after him.

== Honours ==
Juventus

- Serie A champion: 1957–58, 1959–60, 1960–61.
- Coppa Italia winner: 1958–59, 1959–60.

Bologna

- Coppa Italia winner: 1969–70.
