= Giuseppe Patrucco =

Italian footballer (1932–2015)

Personal information
- Date of birth: 4 February 1932
- Place of birth: Turin, Italy
- Date of death: 6 June 2015 (aged 83)
- Place of death: Ivrea, Turin, Italy
- Position: Defender

Senior career*
Years	Team	Apps	(Gls)
1951–1952	Siracusa	18	(0)
1952–1953	Genoa	3	(0)
1953–1956	Sanremese	66	(0)
1956–1957	Parma	26	(0)
1957–1958	Juventus	2	(0)
1958–1960	Monza	20	(0)
- * Club domestic league appearances and goals

Giuseppe Patrucco (4 February 1932 – 6 June 2015) was an Italian professional footballer. He died in Ivrea, Turin, on 6 June 2015, at the age of 83.

== Honours ==
- Serie A champion: 1957–58
