= Giovanni Griffith =

Italian footballer

Personal information
- Date of birth: 9 October 1934
- Place of birth: Parma, Italy
- Date of death: 13 January 1990 (aged 55)
- Height: 1.79 m (5 ft 10 in)
- Position: Defender

Senior career*
Years	Team	Apps	(Gls)
1952–1955	Parma	16	(0)
1955–1957	Palermo	50	(0)
1957–1960	Roma	92	(4)
1960–1961	Atalanta	27	(0)
1961–1965	did not play		
1965–1966	Alessandria	2	(0)
- * Club domestic league appearances and goals

Giovanni Griffith (9 October 1934 – 13 January 1990) was an Italian professional football player.

He was born in Parma, and played for 5 seasons (150 games, 4 goals) in the Serie A for U.S. Città di Palermo, A.S. Roma and Atalanta B.C. He had to end his career at a relatively young age due to serious injuries (fractured tibia and fibula).
