= Gino Stacchini =

Italian footballer

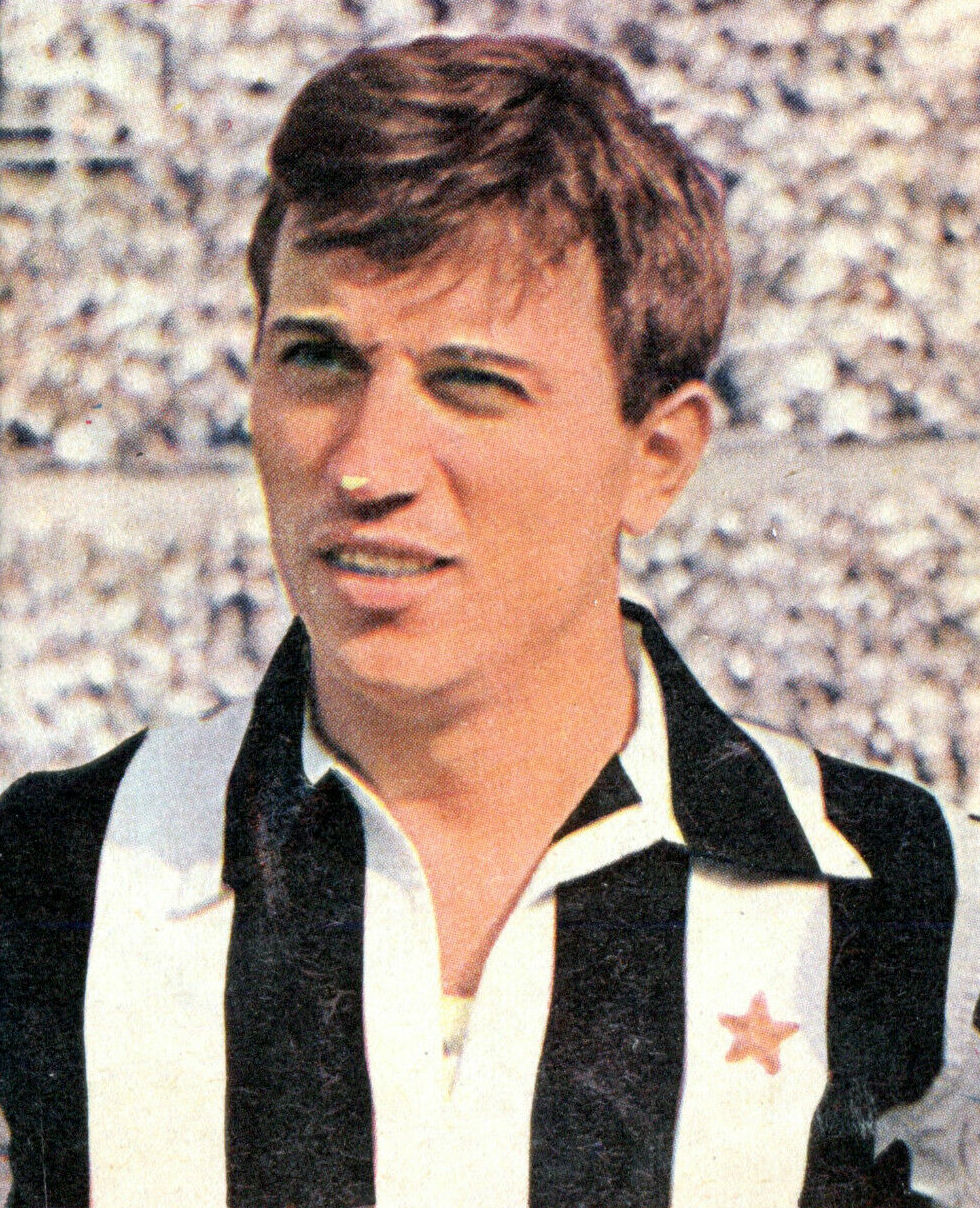
- Stacchini with Juventus in 1962

Personal information
- Date of birth: 18 February 1938 (age 88)
- Place of birth: San Mauro Pascoli, Italy
- Height: 1.71 m (5 ft 7 1/2 in)
- Positions: Forward; midfielder

Senior career*
Years	Team	Apps	(Gls)
1955–1967	Juventus	236	(44)
1967–1968	Mantova	15	(0)
1968–1970	Cesena	33	(2)

International career
1958–1961	Italy	6	(3)
- * Club domestic league appearances and goals

Gino Stacchini (Italian pronunciation: [ˈdʒiːno stakˈkiːni]; born 18 February 1938) is a retired Italian professional footballer who played as a forward or midfielder.

== Honours ==
Juventus

- Serie A champion: 1957–58, 1959–60, 1960–61, 1966–67.
- Coppa Italia winner: 1958–59, 1959–60, 1964–65.
