= Bruno Mazzia =

Italian footballer and coach (born 1941)

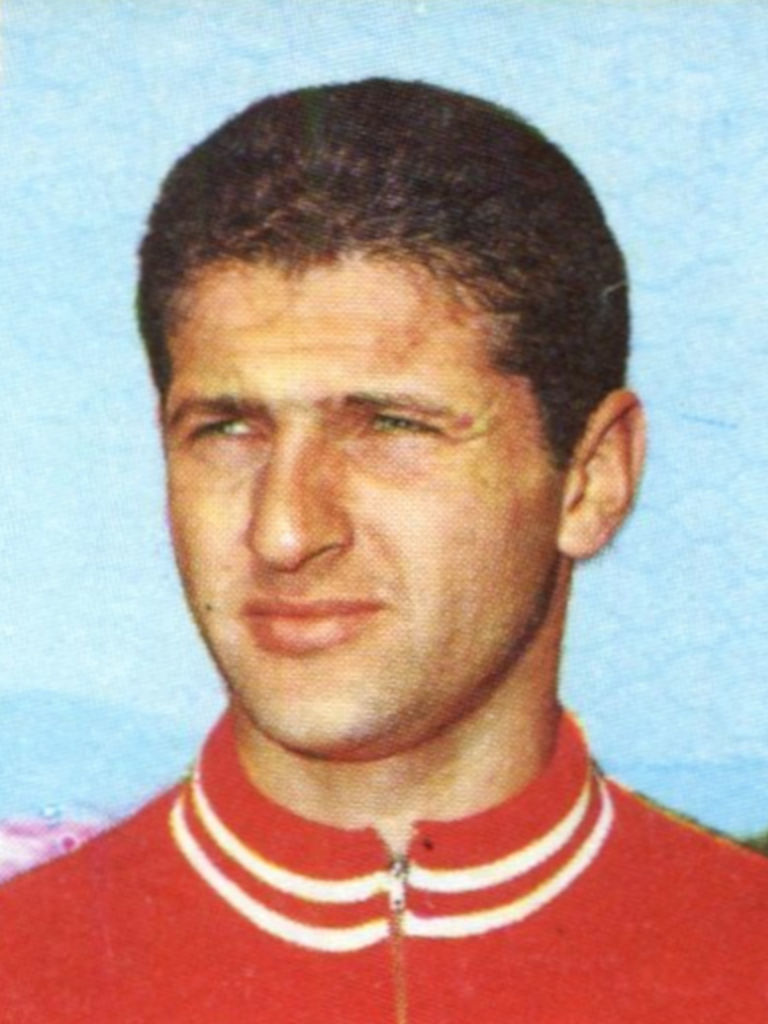
- Mazzia with Perugia in 1969

Personal information
- Date of birth: 14 March 1941 (age 85)
- Place of birth: Vigliano Biellese, Italy
- Height: 1.75 m (5 ft 9 in)
- Position: Midfielder

Senior career*
Years	Team	Apps	(Gls)
1957–1959	Biellese	26	(1)
1959–1962	Juventus	26	(2)
1962–1963	Venezia	13	(0)
1963–1964	Lazio	24	(0)
1964–1966	Juventus	30	(2)
1966–1968	Brescia	52	(9)
1968–1972	Perugia	128	(12)
1972–1973	Reggina	31	(0)
1973–1975	Alessandria	57	(10)
1975	Biellese	2	(0)
1975–1977	Pro Vercelli	57	(8)

Managerial career
- 1978–1979: Nocerina
- 1979–1981: Lecce
- 1982–1983: L.R. Vicenza
- 1983–1984: Mantova
- 1985–1986: Campobasso
- 1986–1989: Cremonese
- 1989–1990: Udinese
- 1990–1991: Brescia
- 1991–1992: Padova
- * Club domestic league appearances and goals

Bruno Mazzia (born 14 March 1941) is an Italian professional football coach and a former player who played as a midfielder.

After Mazzia retired from playing, he became a football manager.

== Honours ==
Juventus

- Serie A: 1960–61
