= Benito Sarti =

Italian footballer (1936–2020)

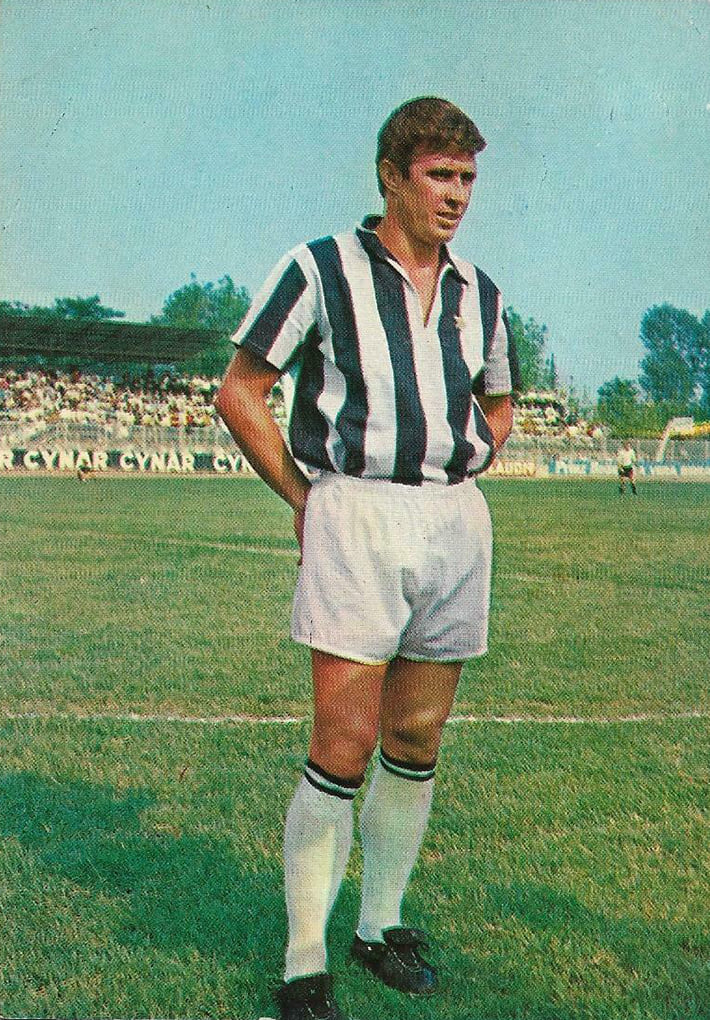
- Sarti with Juventus in 1966

Personal information
- Date of birth: 23 July 1936
- Place of birth: Padua, Kingdom of Italy
- Date of death: 4 February 2020 (aged 83)
- Place of death: Padua
- Height: 1.73 m (5 ft 8 in)
- Position: Defender

Senior career*
Years	Team	Apps	(Gls)
1955–1957	Padova	21	(0)
1957–1959	Sampdoria	63	(0)
1959–1968	Juventus	206	(1)
1968–1969	Varese	7	(0)

International career
1958–1961	Italy	6	(0)
- * Club domestic league appearances and goals

Benito Sarti (Italian pronunciation: [beˈniːto ˈsarti]; 23 July 1936 – 4 February 2020) was an Italian professional footballer who played as a defender or midfielder.

== Club career ==
Sarti made his Serie A debut with Padova (1954–1957) at the age of 19, in a 4–1 away loss to Milan on 26 February 1956, during the 1955–56 Serie A season; he subsequently played for Sampdoria (1957–1959), making 63 appearances for the club. He played for Juventus between 1959 and 1968, obtaining 252 appearances, 206 of which came in Serie A, scoring one goal, which came from long-range in a 6–3 away victory over Atalanta during the 1962–63 Serie A season. During his time with club, he won three Serie A titles, as well as three Coppa Italia titles, and a Coppa delle Alpi. He ended his career after a season with Varese (1968–69).

== International career ==
At international level, Sarti made his senior debut for Italy on 9 November 1958, in a 2–2 friendly draw against France, in Paris. In total, he made six appearances for Italy between 1958 and 1961.

== Style of play ==
Primarily a defender, Sarti usually played as a full-back, although he was also capable of playing as a central or defensive midfielder on occasion.

== Death ==
Sarti died on 4 February 2020, at the age of 83.

== Honours ==
Juventus

- Serie A champion: 1959–60, 1960–61, 1966–67.
- Coppa Italia winner: 1958–59, 1959–60, 1964–65.
- Coppa delle Alpi winner: 1963.
