= Flavio Emoli =

Italian footballer (1934–2015)

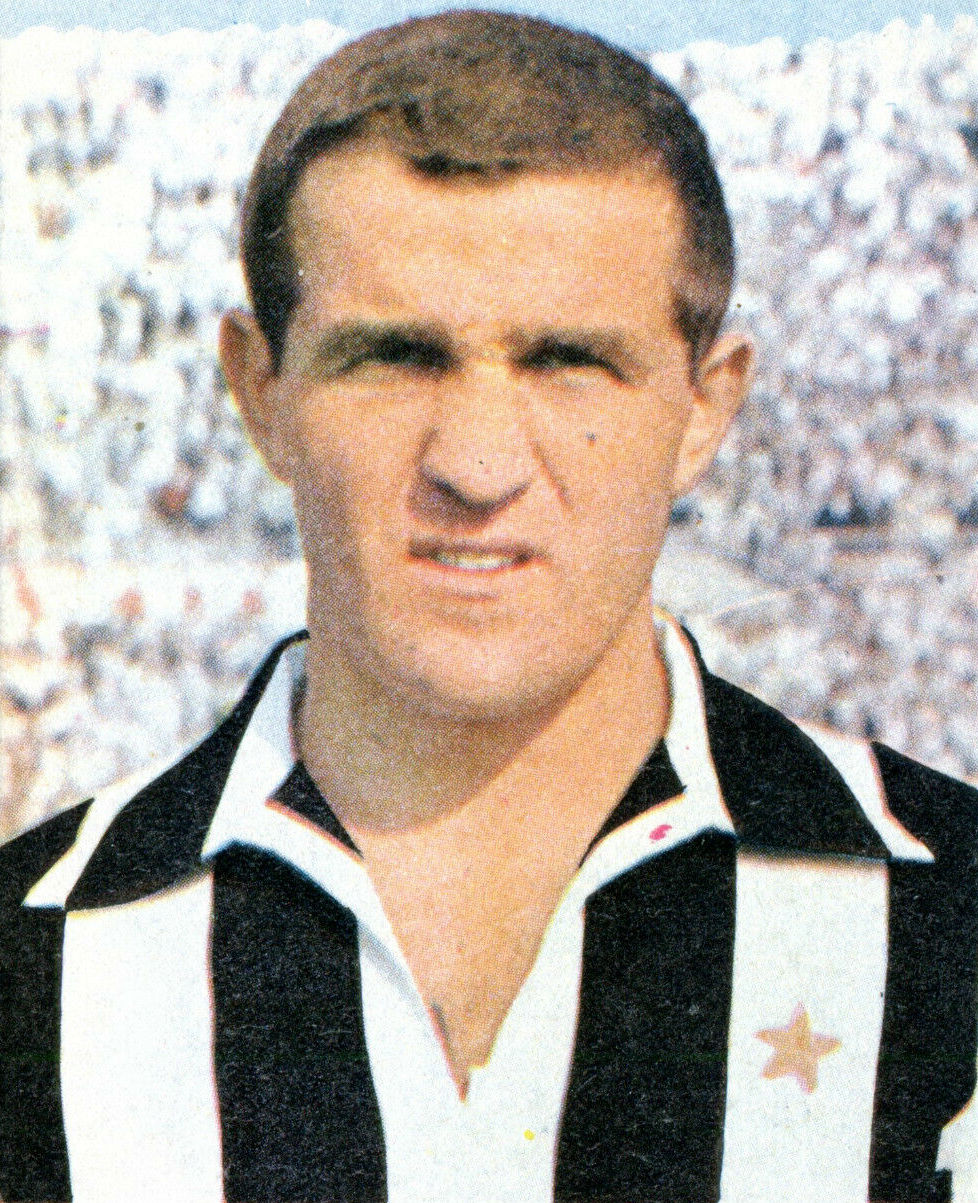
- Emoli with Juventus in 1962

Personal information
- Date of birth: 23 August 1934
- Place of birth: Turin, Italy
- Date of death: 5 October 2015 (aged 81)
- Height: 1.74 m (5 ft 9 in)
- Position: Midfielder

Senior career*
Years	Team	Apps	(Gls)
1953–1963	Juventus	217	(8)
1954–1955	→ Genoa (loan)	8	(0)
1963–1967	Napoli	63	(0)
1967–1968	Genoa	6	(0)
Total		294	(8)

International career
1958–1959	Italy	2	(0)
- * Club domestic league appearances and goals

Flavio Emoli (Italian pronunciation: [ˈflaːvjo ˈɛːmoli]; 23 August 1934 – 5 October 2015) was an Italian professional footballer who played as a midfielder. He is mostly remembered for his ten years with Juventus, where he won three Serie A titles, and served as the team's captain.

== Honours ==
Juventus

- Serie A: 1957–58, 1959–60, 1960–61.
- Coppa Italia: 1958–59, 1959–60.
