= Guido Macor =

Italian footballer

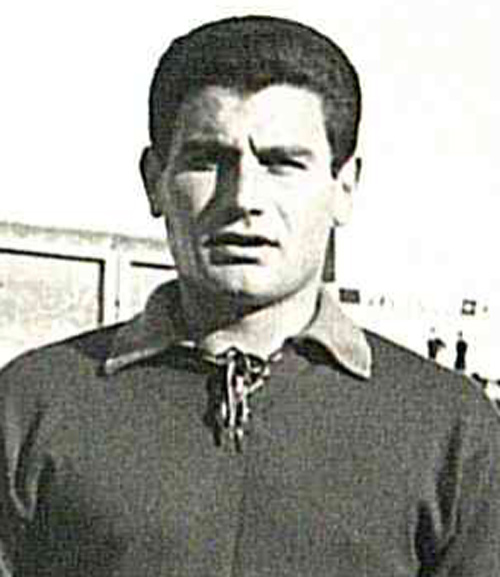

Personal information
- Date of birth: October 4, 1932
- Place of birth: Udine, Italy
- Date of death: February 27, 2024 (aged 91)
- Place of death: Udine, Italy
- Position: Striker

Senior career*
Years	Team	Apps	(Gls)
1950–1951	Pro Gorizia		
1951–1953	Fanfulla	26	(2)
1953–1954	Juventus	3	(0)
1954–1955	Monza	20	(7)
1955–1956	SPAL	26	(9)
1956–1957	Genoa	18	(2)
1957–1958	SPAL	10	(3)
1958–1960	Catania	69	(24)
1960-1961	Parma Calcio		
1961–1963	Sambenedettese	45	(10)
- * Club domestic league appearances and goals

Guido Macor (October 4, 1932 – February 27, 2024) was an Italian professional footballer from Udine, Italy.

== Club career ==
Guido Macor made his debut in 1950 at age 17 as a striker at club Pro Gorizia in Serie C. Guido quickly made it up to Serie B, when he moved Fanfulla in the 52/53 season. In the 53/54 season, he moved to Juventus. For the 54/54 season, Gudio was loaned to Monza FBC. in the 55/56 season, he moved another time to SPAL. In the 56/57 season, he was loaned to Genoa. After returning, he moved to Catania in the 58/59 season. It was at Catania where he scored most of his goals, as well as his most appearances. Later on in the 60/61 season, he went to Parma Calcio. Afterwards, he went to Sambenedettese in the 61/62 season. In the 63/64 Season, he moved to Treviso.
