= Bruno Mora =

Italian footballer (1937–1986)

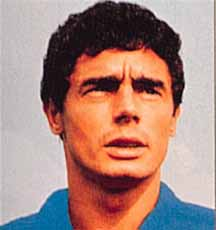
- Mora with Italy

Personal information
- Date of birth: 29 March 1937
- Place of birth: Parma, Italy
- Date of death: 10 December 1986 (aged 49)
- Place of death: Parma, Italy
- Height: 1.75 m (5 ft 9 in)
- Position: Forward

Senior career*
Years	Team	Apps	(Gls)
1957–1960	Sampdoria	71	(19)
1960–1962	Juventus	54	(17)
1962–1969	Milan	116	(27)
1969–1971	Parma	24	(0)
Total		265	(63)

International career
1959–1965	Italy	21	(4)

Managerial career
- 1983: Parma
- * Club domestic league appearances and goals

Bruno Mora (Italian pronunciation: [ˈbruːno ˈmɔːra]; 29 March 1937 – 10 December 1986) was an Italian football player and coach, who played as a right winger. He began his club career with U.C. Sampdoria, and later won domestic and international titles with Juventus FC and AC Milan, before spending the final seasons of his career with Parma. At the international level, he represented the Italy national team at the 1962 FIFA World Cup, where he scored Italy's fastest ever World Cup goal.

== Club career ==
Mora played for 13 seasons in the Serie A for U.C. Sampdoria, Juventus FC, AC Milan and Parma, scoring 63 goals in 245 appearances. He is mostly remembered for performances during his successful domestic and European stint with Milan, during which he won the 1963 European Cup Final against Benfica at Wembley Stadium, as well as the 1967 Coppa Italia final, and the 1967–68 Serie A title. Mora had also previously won the 1960–61 Serie A title with Juventus. He finished his career with Parma in the lower divisions, winning the 1969–70 Serie D title.

== International career ==
Mora earned 21 caps and scored 4 goals for the Italy national team between 1959 and 1965. He made his international debut in a 1–1 draw against Hungary, in Florence, on 29 November 1959, and he was a member of the Italian side that took part in the 1962 FIFA World Cup in Chile. He scored a goal in the second minute of Italy's final group match against Switzerland, on 7 June 1962, although the 3–0 victory was not enough to prevent the Italians from controversially going out in the first round of the tournament. Along with Pietro Ferraris's goal against Norway in 1938 FIFA World Cup, this is Italy's fastest ever World Cup goal. A serious injury (following a collision with Bologna player Giuseppe Spalazzi) impeded him from taking part in the 1966 World Cup, and also affected his confidence and later performances.

== Style of play ==
A quick and talented player, Mora was known for his skill, pace, eye for goal, and crossing ability, as well as his direct, offensive style of play on the right wing; during his prime he was regarded as one of the best players in the world in his position, and was known for his ability to get past opponents through his use of feints or sudden bursts of acceleration.

== Death ==
Mora died in 1986, at the age of 49, due to a stomach tumour.

== Honours ==
Milan

- European Cup: 1962–63
- Serie A: 1967–68
- Coppa Italia: 1966–67

Juventus

- Serie A: 1960–61

Parma

- Serie D: 1969–70

Individual

- AC Milan Hall of Fame
