= Guerrino Rossi =

Italian footballer and coach

Personal information
- Date of birth: February 2, 1934
- Place of birth: Monticelli d'Ongina, Italy
- Date of death: August 19, 1996 (aged 62)
- Position: Striker

Senior career*
Years	Team	Apps	(Gls)
1951–1955	Cremonese	112	(55)
1955–1956	Juventus	1	(0)
1956–1958	Siena	52	(24)
1958–1959	Sanremese	37	(18)
1959–1960	SPAL	22	(9)
1960–1961	Cagliari	31	(18)
1961–1962	Cesena	23	(8)
1962	Cremonese	1	(0)
1962–1963	Vittorio Veneto	8	(0)

Managerial career
- ?: Fiorenzuola
- 1968–1973: Piacenza (assistant)
- 1973–1975: Sant'Angelo
- 1975–1976: Fidenza
- 1976–1977: Suzzara
- 1978–1979: Fidenza
- * Club domestic league appearances and goals

Guerrino Rossi (February 2, 1934 – August 19, 1996) was an Italian professional football player and coach. He was born in Monticelli d'Ongina, Province of Piacenza.
