= Severino Lojodice =

Italian footballer (1933–2023)

Personal information
- Date of birth: 25 October 1933
- Place of birth: Milan, Italy
- Date of death: 19 September 2023 (aged 89)
- Height: 1.77 m (5 ft 10 in)
- Position: Midfielder

Senior career*
Years	Team	Apps	(Gls)
1953–1954	Fanfulla	12	(5)
1954–1955	Cremonese	28	(8)
1955–1956	Monza	24	(11)
1956–1959	Roma	88	(24)
1959–1960	Juventus	11	(1)
1960–1961	Sampdoria	22	(0)
1961–1963	Brescia	30	(4)
1963–1964	Monza	15	(5)
1966–1968	Pro Sesto		
- * Club domestic league appearances and goals

Severino Lojodice (25 October 1933 – 19 September 2023) was an Italian professional footballer who played as a midfielder. He died on 19 September 2023, at the age of 89.

== Honours ==
Juventus

- Serie A: 1959–60
- Coppa Italia: 1959–60
