= Mario Tortul =

Italian footballer and manager

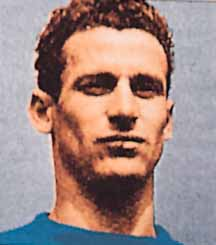
- Tortul with Italy national team in 1956

Personal information
- Full name: Mario Tortul
- Date of birth: 25 February 1931
- Place of birth: San Canzian d'Isonzo, Italy
- Date of death: 25 August 2008 (aged 77)
- Place of death: Genoa, Italy
- Position: Midfielder

Senior career*
Years	Team	Apps	(Gls)
1950–1951	Pieris	?	(?)
1951–1953	Taranto	61	(39)
1953–1958	Sampdoria	144	(42)
1958–1959	Triestina	26	(6)
1959–1962	Padova	82	(22)
1962–1964	Ancona	47	(4)
1964–1965	Ternana	?	(?)
1964–1965	Teramo	?	(?)

International career
1956	Italy	1	(0)

Managerial career
- 1965: Teramo
- 1974–75: Baracca Lugo
- 1977–78: Cuneo
- 1978–79: Sestri Levante
- 1979–80: Gozzano
- * Club domestic league appearances and goals

Mario Tortul (Italian pronunciation: [ˈmaːrjo ˈtɔrtul]; 25 February 1931 – 25 August 2008) was an Italian association football manager and footballer who played as a midfielder. On 11 November 1956, he was in the Italy national football team at the 1955–60 Central European International Cup match against Switzerland in a 1–1 away draw.
