= John Charles =

Welsh footballer (1931–2004)

John Charles CBE
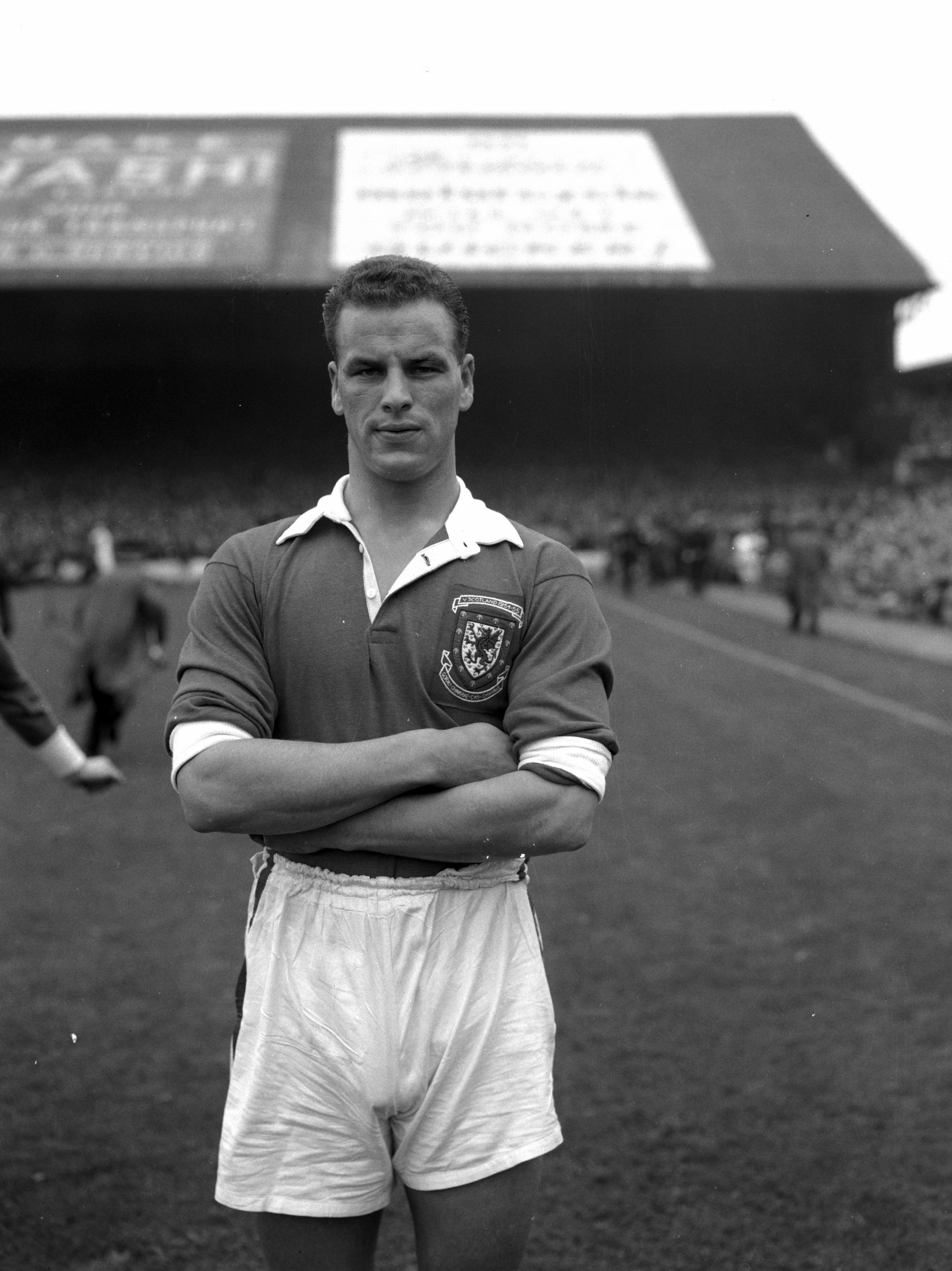
- Charles with Wales in 1954

Personal information
- Full name: William John Charles
- Date of birth: 27 December 1931
- Place of birth: Swansea, Wales
- Date of death: 21 February 2004 (aged 72)
- Place of death: Wakefield, England
- Height: 6 ft 2 in (1.88 m)
- Positions: Centre-forward; centre-back

Youth career
- 1946–1948: Swansea Town
- 1948–1949: Leeds United

Senior career*
Years	Team	Apps	(Gls)
1949–1957	Leeds United	297	(150)
1957–1962	Juventus	155	(108)
1962	Leeds United	11	(3)
1962–1963	Roma	10	(4)
1963–1966	Cardiff City	69	(18)
1966–1971	Hereford United	173	(80)
1972–1974	Merthyr Tydfil		
Total		715	(363)

International career
1950–1965	Wales	38	(15)

Managerial career
- 1967–1971: Hereford United (player-manager)
- 1972–1974: Merthyr Tydfil (player-manager)
- 1987: Hamilton Steelers
- * Club domestic league appearances and goals

William John Charles (27 December 1931 – 21 February 2004) was a Welsh footballer who played at centre-forward and centre-back.

Charles began his career at Leeds United, having moved there in 1949 from his hometown club, Swansea Town. He was equally adept as a defender or a forward, due to his strength, pace, technique, vision, ability in the air and eye for goal. After returning from national service in 1952, Charles began to be used more often as a forward and was the Second Division's top scorer in 1954. The following year, he was named club captain; in his first season as captain, he led the club to second place and promotion. Charles ended the 1956–57 season as the First Division's top scorer and an eighth-place finish for Leeds. In the summer of 1957, Charles joined Juventus, where he partnered Giampiero Boniperti and Omar Sívori, with the trio becoming known as The Holy Trident. In his five seasons with the club, he won the scudetto three times and the Coppa Italia twice; he was also the capocannoniere winner for the 1957–58 season. In 1962, Charles returned to Leeds, but his time there proved unsuccessful as he was accustomed to the style of play in Italy, and by the end of the year, he had joined Roma. Charles moved back to his native country to play for Cardiff City and ended his career in non-league football in player-manager roles at Hereford United and Merthyr Tydfil. He was never cautioned nor sent off during his entire career, owing to his philosophy of never kicking nor intentionally hurting opposing players. This led to the nickname he acquired while playing for Juventus, Il Gigante Buono (The Gentle Giant). In 1998, Charles was included in the Football League 100 Legends and, in 2002, was one of the inaugural inductees to the Football Hall of Fame.

Charles played for the Welsh national team over fifteen years, from 1950 to 1965. Alongside his brother, Mel Charles, he was a member of the Welsh squad at the 1958 FIFA World Cup. At the tournament, he scored in a 1–1 draw with Hungary but was injured in a play-off match against the same opposition and ruled out of the quarter-final against Brazil, Wales lost the match 1–0, with Pelé scoring the winner. Wales manager Jimmy Murphy opined that had Charles been fit, Wales might have won the match.

For its 50th anniversary in 2004, UEFA asked each of its then 52 member associations to nominate one player as the single most outstanding player of the period 1954–2003: Charles was chosen as the Golden Player of Wales by its national association in November 2003.

== Early career ==
Charles was born in the Cwmbwrla district of Swansea during late 1931. Charles would play football as a child, with younger brother Mel Charles who also went on to become a professional, later playing alongside each other for the Welsh national team. The brothers grew up on Alice Street in Swansea, being neighbours of fellow future Welsh internationals Ernie Jones, Mel Nurse, and Jackie Roberts.

While still at school, Charles joined the boys section of the local team Swansea Town, who later became Swansea City. When he left school at age 14 he was taken onto the groundstaff at Vetch Field, yet because of his young age Third Division Swansea never gave him a first-team call up. His only senior appearances came for the reserve side in the Welsh Football League.

== Club career ==
=== Leeds United ===
While playing for Gendros, a local youth club, he was scouted by Leeds United and given a trial in September 1948. At his trial he impressed and duly signed for them at the age of 17, relocating to Yorkshire.

Then manager of Leeds United, Major Buckley, selected Charles in a variety of positions including right-back, centre-half and left-half for Leeds Reserves. Charles made his first team debut as a centre back for Leeds in a friendly versus Dumfries club Queen of the South on 19 April 1949. Charles was tasked with marking the incumbent Scotland centre forward Billy Houliston, who ten days previously at Wembley, had run the England defence ragged as the Scots won 3–1. The score at Elland Road was 0–0. After the game, Houliston said 17-year-old Charles was "the best centre half I've ever played against". Charles made his league debut against Blackburn Rovers also in April 1949, playing at centre-half. From 1950 until 1952, Charles was away on National Service with the 12th Royal Lancers at Carlisle. The army allowed him to turn out for Leeds, but also saw to it that he played for them, and in 1952, Charles skippered his side to the Army Cup. It was during this period that he had operations to repair cartilages in both knees.

After his return to the Leeds side in November 1951, Charles played at centre-forward and centre half. This prompted a debate as to where Charles should play in the team, but he remained at centre-half until the 1952–53 season. In October 1952, he was switched to centre forward and immediately started to score, with 11 goals in 6 games. In 1955, he was appointed club captain and during the 1955–56 season, Leeds won promotion to the First Division. Charles was in sparkling form, scoring 29 goals in 42 appearances. In the following season, Charles scored a new club top flight record tally of 38 goals in 40 league appearances as Leeds secured an 8th-place finish in the first division, before finally moving away from the club. His influence on Leeds' success during his final season was so strong, reporters nicknamed the club "John Charles United". In total, he scored 150 league goals in eight years for Leeds, including a club record 42 goals in 39 appearances during the 1953–54 season. He remains the second highest all time goal scorer for Leeds after Peter Lorimer.

=== Juventus ===
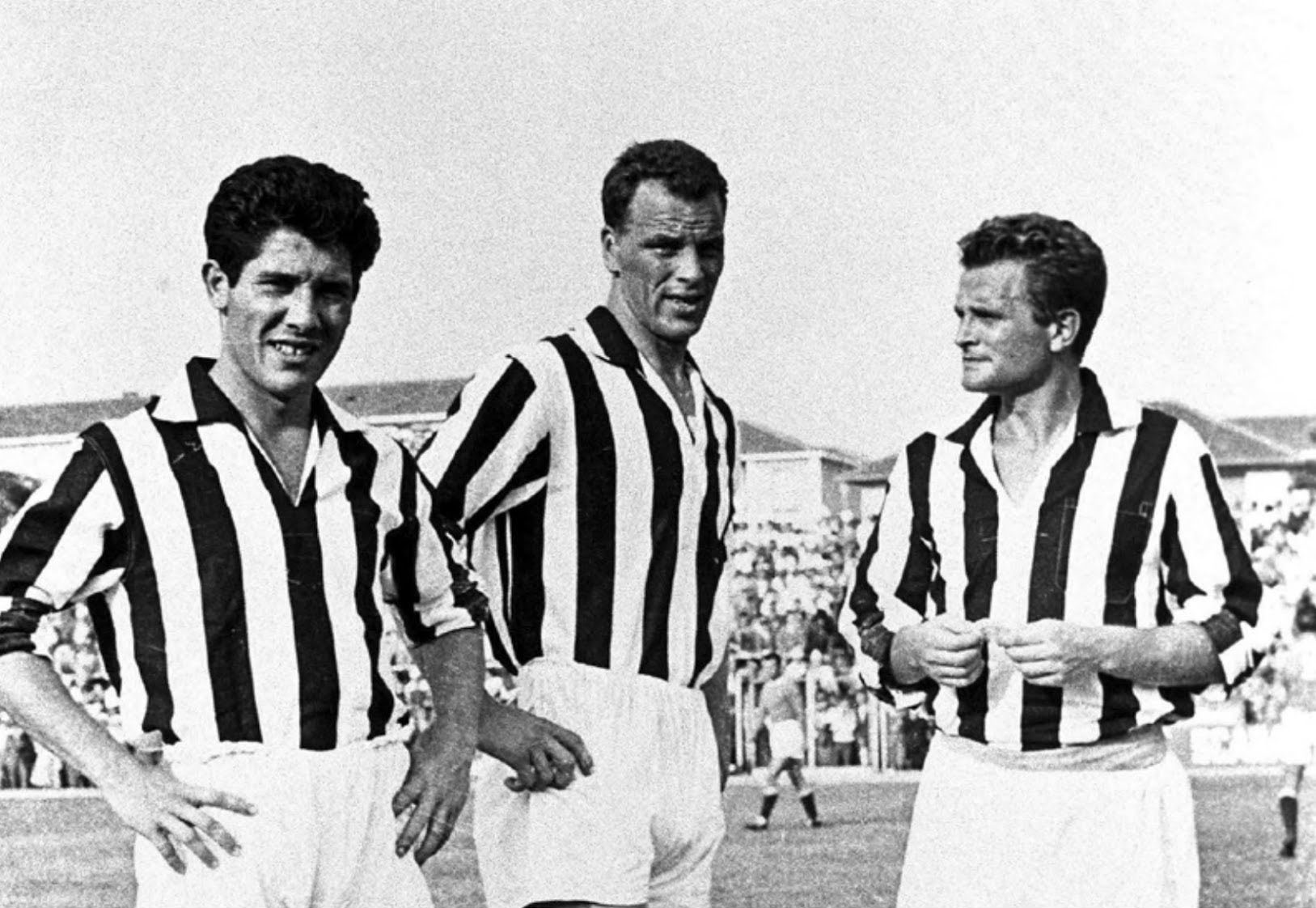
The Holy Trident: Charles with Sívori and Boniperti at Juventus

In August 1957, he joined the Italian club Juventus for a then British record £65,000 transfer fee, almost doubling the previous record. The transfer was notable as Charles became one of the first British professional players to be signed for an overseas team after John Fox Watson led the way moving from Fulham to Real Madrid in 1948.

His debut came on 8 September 1957 against Hellas Verona. Goals from Giampiero Boniperti and Omar Sívori had made the score 2–2, when up popped Charles to score the winner. The following week, he scored the only goal in the victory over Udinese, and he then hit the decisive strike in a 3–2 victory over Genoa. He had been the match-winner in his first three games.

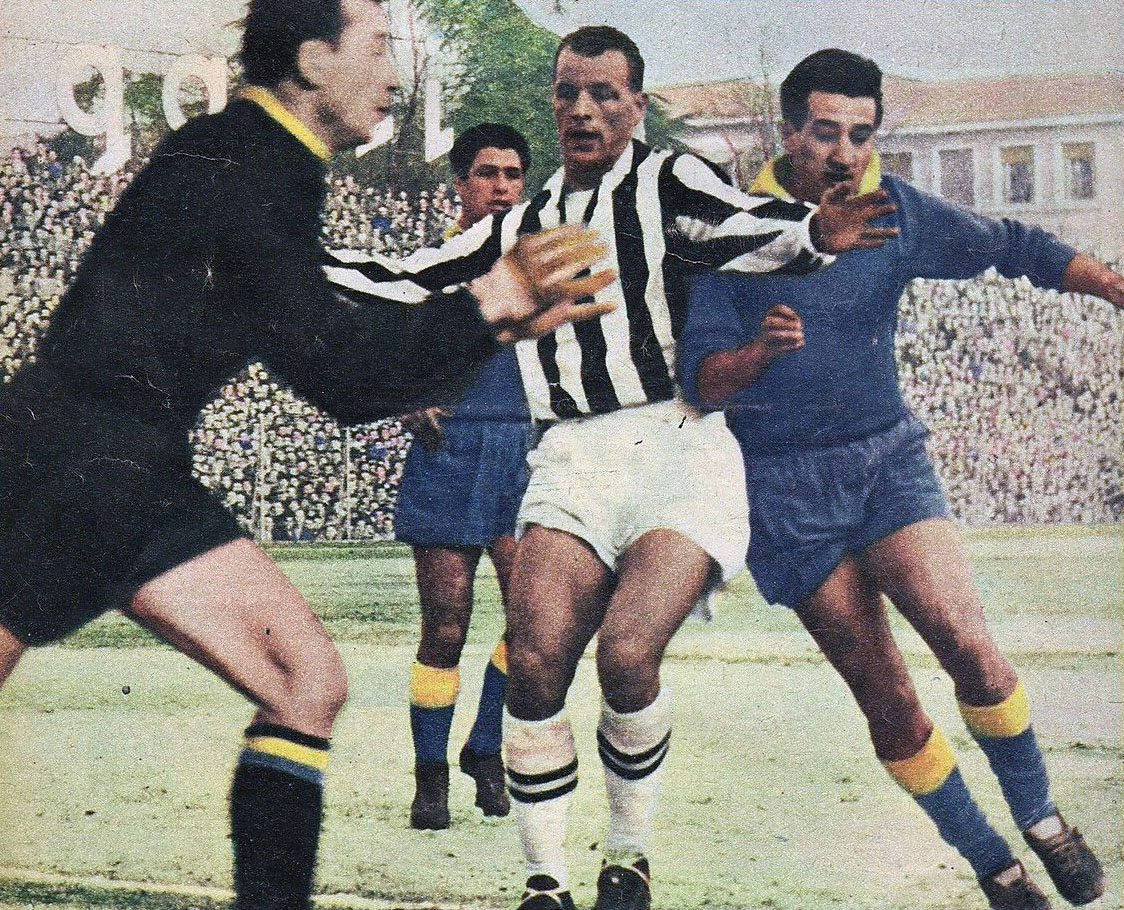
January 26, 1958. A.C. Verona — Juventus FC 2–3, Matchday 18 of the 1957–58 Serie A. Juventus striker John Charles (center) in action versus Verona's defence.

In his first season in Italy, Charles was Serie A's top scorer with 28 goals, and was voted player of the season as Juventus won the scudetto. He played in Turin for five years, scoring 108 goals in 155 matches, winning the scudetto (Italian league championship) three times, and the Coppa Italia twice. He placed third in the Ballon d'Or in 1959, the highest position for a Welsh footballer. His prolific partnership with Sívori and Boniperti in Juventus's front-line earned the trio the nicknames The Holy Trident and The Magical Trio; Charles was also dubbed Il Gigante Buono (The Gentle Giant) during his five seasons with the club, due to his size and fair play. The respect Charles earned from Juventus fans was shown when, on the occasion of the club's centenary in 1997, they voted him the club's best-ever foreign player.

=== Return to Leeds United ===
Following his time at Juventus, Don Revie paid a club record £53,000 to secure the return of Charles to Yorkshire. As a result of the excitement this created, Leeds United raised admission prices for the start of the 1962–63 season. Charles second spell at Elland Road was less successful. After five years in Italy, he found it difficult to adjust to life and football back in Britain.

=== Roma ===
After 11 games and three goals – a shadow of his former strike rate – Charles was sold for £70,000 to Roma. Initially, the move was a success and Charles scored within fifteen minutes of his first game for Roma, in a match against Bologna. The early promise was never fulfilled, however, and Charles was on the move again a year later.

=== Later career ===
He left to join Cardiff City where he stayed until 1966, which marked the end of his league career. He later became manager of Hereford United, Merthyr Tydfil and the Swansea City youth team, and technical director of the Canadian team Hamilton Steelers, whom he became coach of midway through the 1987 season.

== International career ==
Charles first played for the Welsh national team shortly after his 18th birthday.

He played for Wales at the 1958 FIFA World Cup in Sweden – the first time the nation qualified for the competition. It was also the only time all four of the Home Nations qualified for the same World Cup, though only Wales and Northern Ireland made it past the group stage. Wales remained undefeated in the group stage, battling to draws with Hungary (thanks to a Charles goal), Mexico, and eventual runners-up Sweden. As Hungary also recorded three points, a play-off match ensued, and Wales came from behind at the Råsunda Stadium to advance with a 2–1 win; however, Charles was injured in the match and missed out on the rest of the tournament. Wales were eventually knocked out by Brazil in the quarter-finals thanks to a goal by Pelé in the 66th minute: the Brazilians went on to win the competition. Wales manager Jimmy Murphy said that "with John Charles in the side we might have won".

In total for Wales, Charles made 38 appearances and scored 15 goals.

Charles played for the Great Britain team against Ireland in 1955.

== Player profile ==
=== Style of play ===
Regarded as one of the greatest British footballers of all-time, Charles was a versatile footballer who was capable of playing both as a centre-forward and as a centre-back. As a striker, he was renowned for being a prolific goalscorer, as he was capable of scoring with either foot, courtesy of his powerful and accurate shot; due to his height, physique, and strength, as well as his heading power and accuracy, he also excelled in the air, which made him an aerial goal threat. Despite his size, he was also a fast player, with good technical skills and passing ability, which allowed him both to score and create goals. In addition to his ability, he was also known for his correct behaviour on the pitch, which along with his stature, earned him the nickname Il Gigante Buono (The Gentle Giant).

=== Legacy ===
In the foreword for Charles' autobiography, Sir Bobby Robson described him as "incomparable" and classed him among the all-time footballing greats such as Pelé, Diego Maradona and George Best, saying "Incomparable. John wasn't only one of the greatest footballers who ever lived. He was one of the greatest men ever to play the game." He also noted that Charles is the only footballing great to be world class in two very different positions. Giampiero Boniperti, the captain of Juventus when Charles had joined the Bianconeri, spoke of the Welshman's nature as a person: "I would say he was from another world because of his human qualities. John was one of the most loyal and honest people I have ever met, a very special person. He managed to keep the whole team united, and any quarrels or arguments quietened down as soon as he appeared on the pitch or in the dressing room." Jack Charlton said of his former teammate, "John Charles was a team unto himself. People often say to me, 'Who was the best player you ever saw?', and I answer that it was probably Eusébio, Di Stéfano, Cruyff, Pelé or our Bob. But the most effective player I ever saw, the one that made the most difference to the performance of the whole team, was without question John Charles." Charles' sporting behaviour led international referee Clive Thomas to say "If you had 22 players of John's calibre, there would be no need for referees – only time-keepers."

In 1998, the Football League, as part of its centenary season celebrations, included Charles on its list of 100 League Legends. In 2002, Charles became an inaugural inductee to the English Football Hall of Fame. On 29 November 2003, to celebrate UEFA's Jubilee, he was selected as the Golden Player of Wales by the Football Association of Wales as their most outstanding player of the past 50 years. In 2004, Charles was voted at number 19 in the 100 Welsh Heroes poll. On 7 March 2018, Charles had one of Great Western Railway's Intercity Express Trains named after him. In August 2019, a social housing complex named "Clos John Charles" was opened on the site of a former primary school in Cwmbwrla, Swansea.

The John Charles Lounge in Aberystwyth Town's ground is named after Charles. The John Charles Centre for Sport in Leeds is named after Charles. The West stand at Elland Road is named "The John Charles Stand" and the entrance lobby to the Banqueting Suite attached to the back of the stand contains a bust of Charles, in memory of all he did for the club. A street near Elland Road in the Lower Wortley area of Leeds is named John Charles Way.

== Personal life and death ==
Charles was married twice during his life. In 1953, he married Margaret "Peggy" White; the couple had four sons together. They divorced in 1982. In 1988, Charles married Glenda Vero, whom he remained married to until his death in 2004. The Charles name continued in football through nephew Jeremy Charles, who also represented Wales, and grandson Jake Charles, who has represented Wales at youth level.

Following his retirement from football, Charles became the landlord of the New Inn public house on Elland Road, Churwell, Leeds which later was also managed by another Leeds United player and Wales international, Byron Stevenson. On 16 June 2001, as part of that year's Queen's Birthday Honours, he was appointed a Commander of the Order of the British Empire "for services to Association Football". Until shortly before his death he continued to attend every Leeds United home game. In 2002, he was made a vice-president of the Football Association of Wales, and in 2003, he was granted the freedom of the city of Swansea. There was a campaign to knight Charles, but it never came to fruition.

In January 2004, he suffered a heart attack shortly before an interview for Italian television, and required the partial amputation of one foot for circulation reasons before he was returned to Britain. He died in Pinderfields Hospital, Wakefield, West Yorkshire, early on 21 February 2004. His widow, Glenda, bequeathed his ashes to the city of Swansea.

== Career statistics ==
Appearances and goals by club, season and competition
Club	Season	League			National cup (Note: Includes FA Cup and Coppa Italia.)		European Cup		Total	
Club	Season	Division	Apps	Goals	Apps	Goals	Apps	Goals	Apps	Goals
Leeds United	1948-49	Second Division	3	0	0	0	—		3	0
Leeds United	1949–50	Second Division	42	1	5	0	—		47	1
Leeds United	1950–51	Second Division	34	3	2	0	—		36	3
Leeds United	1951–52	Second Division	18	0	5	0	—		23	0
Leeds United	1952–53	Second Division	40	26	1	1	—		41	27
Leeds United	1953–54	Second Division	39	42	2	1	—		41	43
Leeds United	1954–55	Second Division	40	11	2	1	—		42	12
Leeds United	1955–56	Second Division	42	29	1	0	—		43	29
Leeds United	1956–57	First Division	40	38	1	1	—		41	39
Leeds United	Total		298	150	19	4	—		317	154
Juventus	1957–58	Serie A	34	28	4	1	—		38	29
Juventus	1958–59	Serie A	30	19	4	5	2	0	36	24
Juventus	1959–60	Serie A	34	23	3	3	—		37	26
Juventus	1960–61	Serie A	32	15	3	1	2	0	37	16
Juventus	1961–62	Serie A	21	8	4	2	6	0	31	10
Juventus	Total		151	93	18	12	10	0	179	105
Leeds United	1962–63	Second Division	11	3	0	0	—		11	3
Roma	1962–63	Serie A	10	4	3	0	—		13	4
Cardiff City	1963–64	Second Division	33	11	1	0	—		34	11
Cardiff City	1964–65	Second Division	28	3	1	0	—		29	3
Cardiff City	1965–66	Second Division	7	4	2	0	—		9	4
Cardiff City	Total		68	18	4	0	—		72	18
Career total			538	268	44	16	10	0	592	284

== Honours ==
Leeds United

- Second Division runners-up: 1955–56

Juventus

- Serie A: 1957–58, 1959–60, 1960–61
- Coppa Italia: 1958–59, 1959–60

Cardiff City

- Welsh Cup: 1963–64, 1964–65

Wales

- British Home Championship: 1959–60; runners-up: 1960–61, 1961–62
- FIFA World Cup quarter-finalist: 1958

Individual

- English First Division top goalscorer: 1956–57
- Capocannoniere: 1957–58
- Corriere dello Sport Serie A Team of The Year: 1958, 1960
- Corriere dello Sport Serie A Player of The Year: 1958, 1960
- Ballon d'Or: third place: 1959; nominated: 1958, 1960, 1961, 1962
- UEFA Golden Player: Wales
- English Football Hall of Fame: 2002
- Juventus FC Hall of Fame: 2025

== See also ==
- List of foreign Serie A players
- List of Wales international footballers
