= Guglielmo Burelli =

Italian footballer

Personal information
- Date of birth: 30 June 1936 (age 90)
- Place of birth: Vicenza, Italy
- Height: 1.82 m (5 ft 11 1/2 in)
- Position: Defender

Senior career*
Years	Team	Apps	(Gls)
1956–1960	L.R. Vicenza	81	(0)
1960	Juventus	4	(0)
1960–1961	Bologna	16	(0)
1961–1964	Udinese	97	(1)
1964–1966	Varese	21	(1)
1967	Toronto Falcons		
- * Club domestic league appearances and goals

Guglielmo Burelli (born 30 June 1936 in Vicenza) is a retired Italian professional footballer who played as a defender.
