= 1959–60 Coppa Italia =

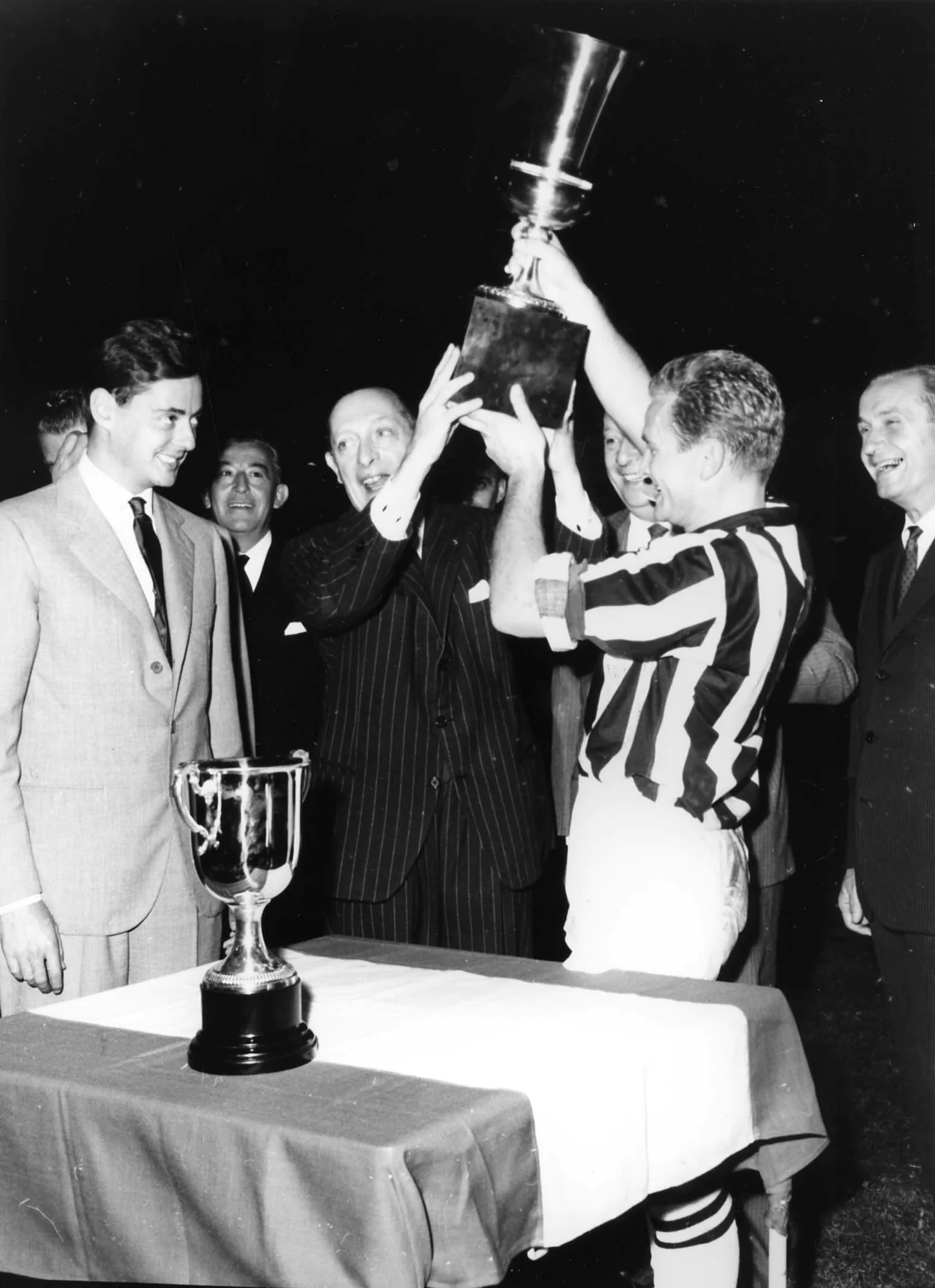
- Juventus captain Giampiero Boniperti (right) receives and raises the trophy of the 1959-60 Italian Cup.

Tournament details
- Country: Italy
- Dates: 6 Sept 1959 – 18 Sept 1960
- Teams: 38

Final positions
- Champions: Juventus (4th title)
- Runners-up: Fiorentina

Tournament statistics
- Matches played: 38
- Goals scored: 126 (3.32 per match)
- Top goal scorer(s): Mario Pistacchi (5 goals)

The 1959–60 Coppa Italia was the 13th Coppa Italia, the major Italian domestic cup. The competition was won by Juventus, who defeated Fiorentina 3–2 in extra time in the final.

== First round ==
| Home team | Score | Away team |
|---|---|---|
| Como | 2-1 (aet) | Lecco |
| Messina | 1-0 | Catanzaro |
| Udinese | 3-2 (aet) | Triestina |
| Brescia | 2-2 (p: 4–6) | Modena |
| Vicenza | 1-0 | Marzotto |
| Parma | 1-5 | SPAL |
| Bari | 3-1 | Taranto |
| Napoli | 4-0 | Sambenedettese |
| Roma | 4-0 | Cagliari |
| Padova | 3-2 (aet) | Hellas Verona |
| Sampdoria | 1-0 | Novara |
| Reggiana | 3-2 (aet) | Mantova |
| Monza | 0-1 | Alessandria |
| Palermo | 2-0 | Catania |

p=after penalty shoot-out

== Second round ==
Milan and Atalanta are added.

| Home team | Score | Away team |
|---|---|---|
| Padova | 3-2 | Udinese |
| SPAL | 1-0 | Vicenza |
| Reggiana | 2-1 | Modena |
| Atalanta | 5-0 | Alessandria |
| Roma | 0-2 | Sampdoria |
| Napoli | 1-0 | Bari |
| Palermo | 1-0 | Messina |
| Milan | 0-1 (aet) | Como |

== Round of 16 ==
Genoa, Torino, Venezia, Fiorentina, Juventus, Bologna, Lazio, Internazionale are added.

| Home team | Score | Away team |
|---|---|---|
| Atalanta | 2-0 | Genoa |
| Padova | 0-2 | Torino |
| Venezia | 2-1 | SPAL |
| Fiorentina | 2-0 | Como |
| Juventus | 5-4 (aet) | Sampdoria |
| Bologna | 1-0 | Napoli |
| Lazio | 2-1 (aet) | Palermo |
| Internazionale | 5-2 | Reggiana |

== Quarter-finals ==
| Home team | Score | Away team |
|---|---|---|
| Atalanta | 2-2 (p: 6-6) * | Juventus |
| Fiorentina | 2-1 | Internazionale |
| Torino | 1-0 | Venezia |
| Bologna | 2-3 (aet) | Lazio |

* Juventus qualify after drawing of lots.

== Semi-finals ==
| Home team | Score | Away team |
|---|---|---|
| Juventus | 3-0 | Lazio |
| Fiorentina | 5-3 | Torino |

== Third place match ==
| Home team | Score | Away team |
|---|---|---|
| Lazio | 2-1 | Torino |

== Final ==
18 September 1960
16:30

| Juventus | 3–2 (a.e.t.) | Fiorentina |
|---|---|---|
| Charles 10', 73'; Orzan 97' (o.g.) | | Montuori 45'; Da Costa 60' |

San Siro, Milan
Attendance: 70,000
Referee: Raoul Righi

== Top goal scorers ==
| Rank | Player | Club | Goals |
|---|---|---|---|
| 1 | (Italy) Mario Pistacchi | Reggiana | 5 |
| 2 | (Italy) Gianfranco Petris | Fiorentina | 4 |
| 3 | (Italy) Mario Corso | Internazionale | 3 |
| 3 | (Italy) Alessandro Vitali | Napoli | 3 |
| 3 | (Sweden) Lennart Skoglund | Sampdoria | 3 |
| 3 | (Italy) Orlando Rozzoni | Lazio | 3 |
| 3 | (Wales) John Charles | Juventus | 3 |
| 3 | (Italy) Angelo Ogliari | Reggiana | 3 |
