= Rino Marchesi =

Italian football player and manager (1937–2026)

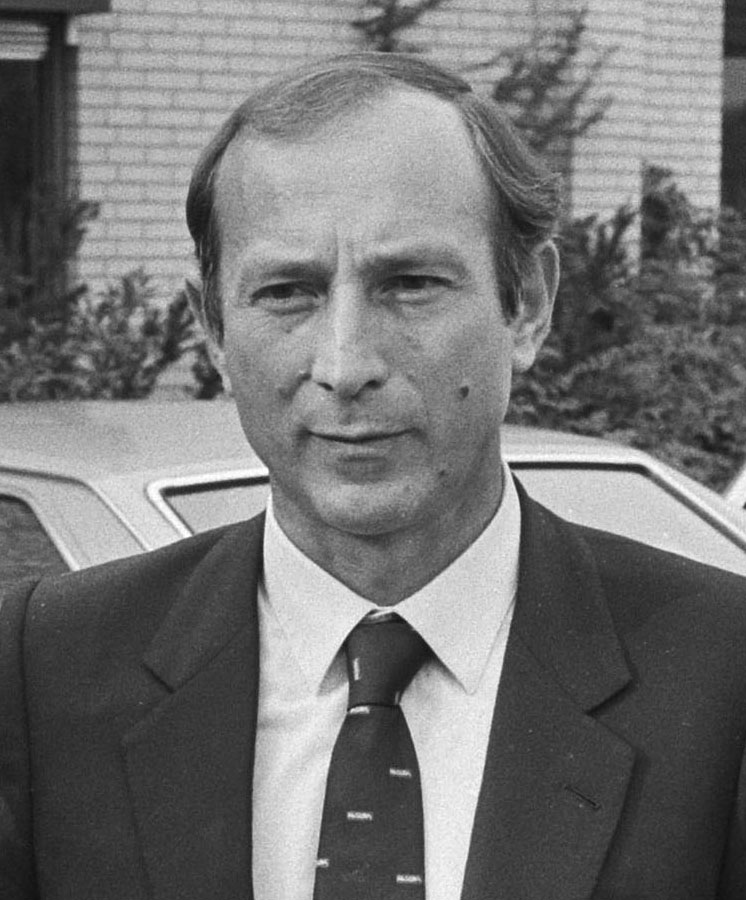
- Marchesi in 1982

Personal information
- Date of birth: 11 June 1937
- Place of birth: San Giuliano Milanese, Italy
- Date of death: 1 March 2026 (aged 88)
- Place of death: Sesto Fiorentino, Italy
- Positions: Defender; midfielder

Senior career*
Years	Team	Apps	(Gls)
1955–1956	Fanfulla	87	(12)
1956–1960	Atalanta	120	(10)
1960–1966	Fiorentina	165	(0)
1966–1971	Lazio	123	(4)
1971–1973	Prato	61	(2)

International career
1961	Italy	2	(0)

Managerial career
- 1973–1974: Montevarchi
- 1974–1976: Mantova
- 1977–1978: Ternana
- 1978–1980: Avellino
- 1980–1982: Napoli
- 1982–1983: Inter Milan
- 1984–1985: Napoli
- 1985–1986: Como
- 1986–1988: Juventus
- 1988–1989: Como
- 1989–1990: Udinese
- 1992: Venezia
- 1992–1993: SPAL
- 1993–1994: Lecce
- * Club domestic league appearances and goals

Rino Marchesi (Italian pronunciation: [ˈriːno marˈkeːzi]; 11 June 1937 – 1 March 2026) was an Italian footballer and manager who played as a midfielder.

== Club career ==
Marchesi was from San Giuliano Milanese. After beginning his career with Fanfulla for a season in 1955, over the course of his playing career, Marchesi played for five Italian club sides, spending most of his time with Atalanta, Fiorentina and Lazio, winning several titles. He ended his career after two seasons with Prato, in 1973.

== International career ==
While with Fiorentina, Marchesi appeared for Italy twice, making his international debut in a 4–1 victory over Argentina on 15 June 1961.

== Managerial career ==
Following his retirement in 1973, Marchesi pursued a career as a manager, coaching several clubs, including Montevarchi, Mantova, and Ternana, before guiding Avellino to avoid relegation to Serie B during the 1978–79 Serie A season, as well as the following season, which earned him attention from larger clubs in Italy. He most notably coached Napoli (1980–82; 1983–85), Inter Milan (1982–83), Como (1985–86; 1988–89) Juventus (1986–88), and Udinese (1989–91). During his managerial career, Marchesi achieved impressive results in his first spell with Napoli during the 1980s, competing for the league title (finishing third in 1980–81 and fourth in 1981–82). He also had the opportunity to coach both Diego Maradona during his second spell at the Neapolitan club, and Michel Platini with Juventus during the playmaker's final season with the Turin side, two of the greatest attacking midfielders of all time. However, Marchesi also had the misfortune of replacing legendary Juventus coach Giovanni Trapattoni after one of the most successful periods in the club's history, failing to replicate similar success during his two seasons with the club, as they went without a title; Juventus finished in second place in the league (Marchesi's best result in Serie A) in 1986–87, behind Marchesi's former club Napoli, and ahead of rivals, Inter, after only overtaking the Milan-based side during the last few matches of the season. After brief stints at Venezia and SPAL between 1992 and 1993, Marchesi's last managerial job was at Lecce; however, his team was relegated from Serie A in 1994, after which he retired from coaching.

== Death ==
Marchesi died on 1 March 2026, at the age of 88.

== Honours ==
=== Player ===
Atalanta

- Serie B: 1958–59

Fiorentina

- UEFA Cup Winners' Cup: 1960–61
- Coppa Italia: 1960–61, 1965–66
- Coppa delle Alpi: 1960–61
- Mitropa Cup: 1966

Lazio

- Serie B: 1968–69
- Coppa delle Alpi: 1971
