= Dino da Costa =

Brazilian-Italian footballer (1931–2020)

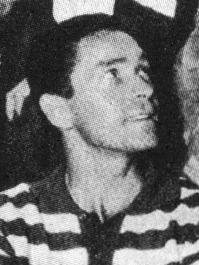

Personal information
- Date of birth: 1 August 1931
- Place of birth: Rio de Janeiro, Brazil
- Date of death: 10 November 2020 (aged 89)
- Place of death: Verona, Italy
- Position: Forward

Senior career*
Years	Team	Apps	(Gls)
1948–1955	Botafogo	51	(36)
1955–1961	Roma	149	(71)
1960–1961	→ Fiorentina (loan)	30	(8)
1961–1963	Atalanta	52	(18)
1963–1966	Juventus	51	(11)
1966–1967	Hellas Verona	31	(5)
1967–1968	Ascoli	10	(0)

International career
1958	Italy	1	(1)
- * Club domestic league appearances and goals

Dino da Costa (Italian: [ˈdiːno da (k)ˈkɔsta], Brazilian Portuguese: [ˈdʒinu dɐ ˈkɔstɐ]; 1 August 1931 – 10 November 2020) was a Brazilian-Italian professional footballer, who played as a central midfielder or striker.

== Club career ==
Da Costa was born in Rio de Janeiro, Brazil. A prolific and effective centre-forward, he began his football career in his native country with Botafogo (1948–55), for whom he scored 36 goals from 51 appearances in the Campeonato Carioca, winning the top-goalscorer award in 1954, with 24 goals, and the league title in 1948, forming a notable attacking partnership with Vinício. He later moved to Italy, where he played for a number of clubs in Serie A. He made his Serie A debut on 18 September 1955, against Vicenza, with Roma, for whom he scored 71 times in 149 appearances between 1955 and 1961, also winning the Inter-Cities Fairs Cup with the club in 1961, and winning the Capocannoniere Award during the 1956–57 season as the Serie A top goalscorer, with 22 goals. Alongside Roma legend Francesco Totti, he is the joint all-time top scorer in the Rome Derby in official competitions, with 11 goals, and 12 including friendly matches.

During his time with Roma, Da Costa also played for Fiorentina on loan during part of the 1960–61 season, during which he won the Coppa Italia, the European Cup Winners' Cup, and the Coppa delle Alpi. After returning to Roma briefly during the following season, he moved to Atalanta (1961–63), where he won his second Coppa Italia in 1963, later moving to Juventus (1963–66), under Heriberto Herrera, where he won his third Coppa Italia title in 1965. He also played for Verona in Serie B (1966–67), and Ascoli in Serie C (1967–68), at the end of his career.

== International career ==
Despite being born in Brazil, Da Costa played once at senior international level for Italy, scoring his only goal in a 2–1 defeat to Northern Ireland, on 15 January 1958; the defeat meant that Italy had failed to qualify for the 1958 FIFA World Cup, finishing second in their group, behind Northern Ireland, by a single point.

== Managerial career ==
Following his professional footballing career, Da Costa also served briefly as a coach in the lower divisions, and the Vatican's Campionato della Città del Vaticano.

== Death ==
Da Costa died in Verona on 10 November 2020, aged 89.

== Honours ==
=== Club ===
Botafogo

- Campeonato Carioca: 1948

Atalanta

- Coppa Italia: 1962–63

Fiorentina

- Coppa Italia: 1960–61
- European Cup Winners' Cup: 1960–61
- Coppa delle Alpi: 1960–61

Juventus

- Coppa Italia: 1964–65

Roma

- Inter-Cities Fairs Cup: 1960–61

=== Individual ===
- Campeonato Carioca Top Goalscorer: 1954 (24 goals)
- Serie A Top Goalscorer: 1956–57 (22 goals)
- Serie A Team of The Year: 1957
