= 1957–58 Serie A =

55th season of top-tier Italian football

Serie A
- Season: 1957–58
- Champions: Juventus; 10th title
- Relegated: Atalanta; Hellas Verona
- European Cup: Juventus
- Matches: 306
- Goals: 880 (2.88 per match)
- Top goalscorer: John Charles (28 goals)

The 1957–58 Serie A season was won by Juventus.

Serie A 1957-58 team distribution

== Teams ==
Hellas Verona and Alessandria had been promoted from Serie B.

== Final classification ==
This season was influenced by the Belfast disaster. Following the defeat of the Italy national football team by Northern Ireland, the sole elimination of Italy from the FIFA World Cup before 2018, the Italian government appointed a commissioner to the FIGC. A reduction of the Serie A to 16 clubs was imposed, with a single promotion from the Serie B and three relegations, but the Football League disagreed. The League won the dispute, and the reduction was annulled establishing a playoff between the 17th in Serie A and the 2nd in Serie B. In the meantime, Atalanta was ranked last for a corruption case: the Bergamo club was later accomplished by a judge, but for equity the ordinary, original regulation with two relegations was restored.

Pos	Team	Pld	W	D	L	GF	GA	GD	Pts	Qualification or relegation
1	Juventus (C)	34	23	5	6	77	44	+33	51	Qualification to European Cup
2	Fiorentina	34	16	11	7	56	36	+20	43	
3	Padova	34	16	10	8	55	42	+13	42	
4	Napoli	34	17	6	11	65	55	+10	40	
5	Roma	34	12	12	10	46	42	+4	36	
6	Bologna	34	12	10	12	47	43	+4	34	
7	Vicenza	34	13	7	14	51	48	+3	33	
7	Torino	34	11	11	12	42	49	−7	33	
9	Milan	34	9	14	11	61	47	+14	32	
9	Udinese	34	10	12	12	51	46	+5	32	
9	Internazionale	34	10	12	12	36	36	0	32	
12	Genoa	34	9	12	13	53	60	−7	30	
12	Sampdoria	34	9	12	13	54	62	−8	30	
12	Alessandria	34	9	12	13	36	42	−6	30	
12	Lazio	34	10	10	14	45	65	−20	30	
12	SPAL	34	10	10	14	32	52	−20	30	
17	Atalanta (Note: Atalanta was ranked last by the Federation due to a match fixing scandal, but later got acquitted.) (R)	34	6	16	12	29	49	−20	28	Relegation to Serie B
18	Hellas Verona (R)	34	10	6	18	44	62	−18	26	Qualification play-offs

Source: Panini
(C) Champions; (R) Relegated
Notes:

Inter and Roma were invited to the 1958–60 Inter-Cities Fairs Cup.
SS Lazio was the cupwinner.

== Results ==
Home \ Away	ALE	ATA	BOL	FIO	GEN	INT	JUV	LRV	LAZ	MIL	NAP	PAD	ROM	SAM	SPA	TOR	UDI	HEL
Alessandria		0–0	2–0	1–0	3–1	2–1	1–2	2–1	4–0	0–0	0–0	0–0	1–3	2–0	0–0	0–0	1–2	3–1
Atalanta	1–1		1–1	0–0	1–1	1–0	0–0	2–4	1–1	1–0	2–4	1–1	0–0	1–0	0–0	0–1	1–1	2–1
Bologna	3–1	3–1		0–3	3–3	1–0	3–4	4–0	5–0	0–0	1–1	0–0	0–0	3–3	0–1	2–1	2–2	1–0
Fiorentina	0–0	2–2	2–1		2–0	0–0	2–1	2–1	2–0	4–3	4–1	6–1	2–0	1–1	3–0	2–1	2–0	1–1
Genoa	0–2	1–2	0–0	1–3		0–0	1–3	1–0	5–2	1–1	2–1	1–4	4–2	3–1	0–0	1–1	1–0	4–1
Internazionale	1–1	1–1	0–2	0–1	1–0		2–2	1–0	5–2	1–0	0–1	0–0	1–1	2–2	4–0	0–0	0–1	1–0
Juventus	2–1	3–0	4–1	0–0	3–2	3–1		5–2	3–1	1–0	1–3	2–1	3–0	4–1	3–1	4–1	2–0	3–2
Vicenza	4–0	2–0	3–2	3–0	3–3	2–0	2–1		1–0	1–1	4–0	1–2	3–1	2–4	2–0	1–1	0–0	1–1
Lazio	2–1	3–1	4–3	2–2	0–0	3–1	1–4	2–0		1–1	4–1	1–0	2–1	2–2	1–1	1–1	1–0	4–0
Milan	1–1	5–0	0–1	2–1	1–5	2–2	1–1	4–1	6–1		2–2	1–1	1–1	0–1	4–2	4–0	1–1	2–0
Napoli	4–1	2–2	0–1	3–1	4–0	1–0	4–3	3–1	1–1	1–0		4–0	0–0	0–1	2–0	3–0	3–2	6–0
Padova	2–1	0–3	3–1	3–2	6–3	0–0	1–1	1–0	3–1	3–2	3–0		3–0	2–0	3–0	3–0	0–0	2–0
Roma	2–1	0–0	2–0	0–0	2–1	0–1	4–1	1–1	3–0	3–3	0–2	3–1		5–1	1–1	2–0	3–3	2–1
Sampdoria	1–1	1–1	0–1	3–1	0–0	0–2	3–2	1–1	1–1	0–2	3–0	3–2	3–1		1–1	4–0	3–5	1–1
SPAL	3–2	2–1	0–2	2–2	1–1	2–0	0–1	1–3	3–0	1–5	1–2	1–1	1–0	1–0		0–1	2–0	1–1
Torino	0–0	4–0	0–0	2–1	4–2	2–3	0–1	1–0	1–1	3–2	4–3	2–0	0–0	4–3	0–1		6–2	0–0
Udinese	2–0	1–0	1–0	1–1	2–2	1–1	0–1	0–1	1–0	1–1	7–0	1–2	1–2	3–3	5–0	1–1		2–0
Hellas Verona	3–0	3–0	1–0	0–1	1–3	2–4	2–3	1–0	1–0	4–3	4–3	1–1	0–1	5–3	1–2	2–0	3–2	

Source: Almanacco Illustrato del Calcio - La Storia 1898-2004, Panini Edizioni, Modena, September 2005 (in Italian)
Legend: Blue = home team win; Yellow = draw; Red = away team win.

== Serie A qualification ==
Hellas Verona had to play two qualification matches against the team that ranked second in Serie B.

20 July 1958

Hellas Verona	0–1	Bari
		Erba 66'

Stadio Comunale, Bologna
Referee: Vincenzo Orlandini

24 July 1958

Bari	2–0	Hellas Verona
Erba 81', 85'

Stadio Olimpico, Rome
Referee: Pietro Bonetto

Hellas Verona relegated to Serie B.

== Top goalscorers ==
Rank	Player	Club	Goals
1	(Wales) John Charles	Juventus	28
2	(Italy) Eddie Firmani	Sampdoria	23
3	(Argentina) (Italy) Omar Sívori	Juventus	22
4	(Brazil) Luís Vinício	Napoli	21
5	(Sweden) Kurt Hamrin	Padova	20
6	(Brazil) (Italy) Dino da Costa	Roma	18
7	(Argentina) (Italy) Antonio Valentín Angelillo	Internazionale	16
8	(Sweden) Bengt Lindskog	Udinese	14
9	(Brazil) Emanuele Del Vecchio	Hellas Verona	13
9	(Italy) Sergio Campana	Vicenza	13
9	(Italy) Paolo Barison	Genoa	13
12	(Uruguay) Julio Abbadie	Genoa	12
12	(Italy) Ezio Pascutti	Bologna	12
12	(Italy) Gino Pivatelli	Bologna	12
12	(Italy) Carlo Galli	Milan	12
12	(Italy) Lorenzo Bettini	Udinese	12
12	(Argentina) (Italy) Miguel Montuori	Fiorentina	12
18	(Italy) Sergio Brighenti	Padova	11

== References and sources ==
- Almanacco Illustrato del Calcio - La Storia 1898-2004, Panini Edizioni, Modena, September 2005
