= 1959–60 Serie A =

57th season of top-tier Italian football

Serie A
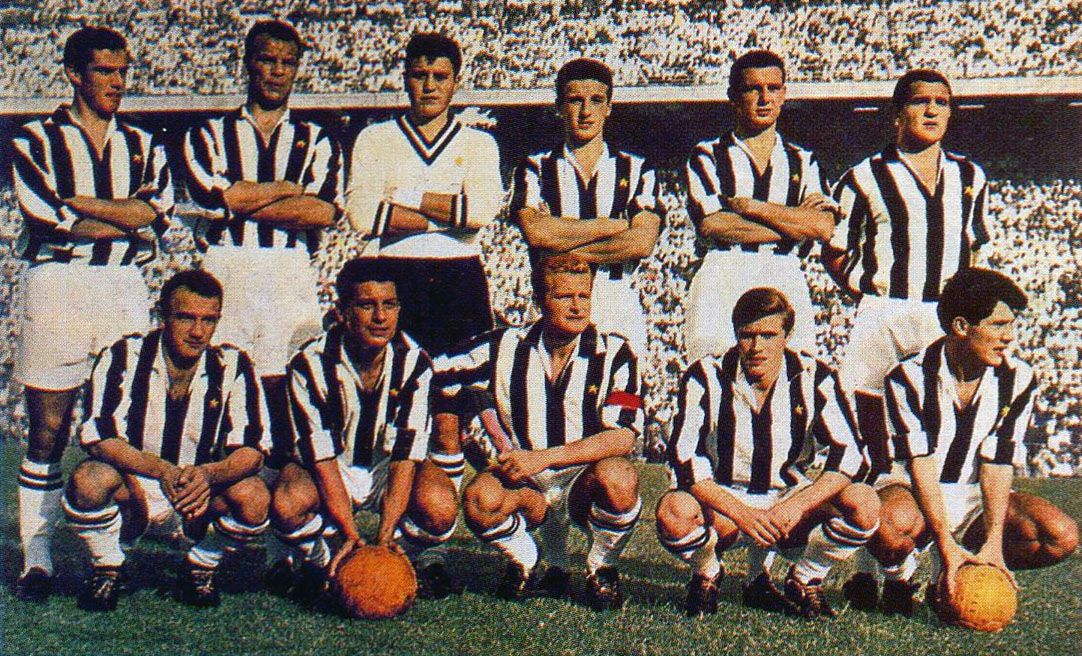
- 1959–60 Juventus' line-up
- Season: 1959–60
- Champions: Juventus; 11th title
- Relegated: Palermo; Alessandria; Genoa
- European Cup: Juventus
- Cup Winners' Cup: Fiorentina
- Inter-Cities Fairs Cup: Internazionale; Roma
- Matches: 306
- Goals: 792 (2.59 per match)
- Top goalscorer: Omar Sivori (28 goals)

The 1959–60 Serie A season was won by Juventus.

Serie A 1959-60 team distribution

== Teams ==
Atalanta and Palermo had been promoted from Serie B.

== Events ==
A modern professional structure was introduced, together with a third relegation.

== Final classification ==
Pos	Team	Pld	W	D	L	GF	GA	GD	Pts	Qualification or relegation
1	Juventus (C)	34	25	5	4	92	33	+59	55	Qualified for the European Cup
2	Fiorentina	34	20	7	7	68	31	+37	47	Qualified for the Cup Winners' Cup
3	Milan	34	17	10	7	56	37	+19	44	
4	Internazionale	34	14	12	8	55	43	+12	40	Invited for the Inter-Cities Fairs Cup
5	Bologna	34	14	8	12	50	42	+8	36	
5	Padova	34	14	8	12	50	46	+4	36	
5	SPAL	34	12	12	10	45	50	−5	36	
8	Sampdoria	34	11	13	10	41	46	−5	35	
9	Roma	34	13	8	13	53	53	0	34	Invited for the Inter-Cities Fairs Cup
10	Vicenza	34	11	10	13	39	42	−3	32	
11	Atalanta	34	9	13	12	31	39	−8	31	
12	Lazio	34	9	12	13	32	45	−13	30	
13	Bari	34	9	11	14	32	42	−10	29	
13	Napoli	34	8	13	13	33	48	−15	29	
15	Udinese	34	6	16	12	39	54	−15	28	
16	Palermo (R)	34	6	15	13	27	40	−13	27	Relegated to Serie B
17	Alessandria (R)	34	5	15	14	28	51	−23	25	Relegated to Serie B
18	Genoa (Note: Genoa was penalized of 18 points for bribery, and 10 more in the following season. The points for the following seasons were reduced to 7 in appeal.) (R)	34	4	10	20	21	50	−29	0	Relegated to Serie B

Source: Panini
(C) Champions; (R) Relegated
Notes:

Inter and Roma were invited to the 1960–61 Inter-Cities Fairs Cup.

== Results ==
Home \ Away	ALE	ATA	BAR	BOL	FIO	GEN	INT	JUV	LRV	LAZ	MIL	NAP	PAD	PAL	ROM	SAM	SPA	UDI
Alessandria		0–0	2–0	1–1	3–3	2–1	2–3	0–2	3–1	0–0	3–1	1–1	0–0	1–0	0–0	2–2	0–1	0–1
Atalanta	5–1		3–0	3–0	1–3	2–1	1–1	2–2	1–1	0–0	0–0	1–0	1–0	1–0	2–0	0–0	2–2	0–0
Bari	0–0	1–0		1–1	1–0	1–0	1–3	1–3	0–0	0–0	3–0	1–1	5–2	1–0	2–3	1–1	0–0	3–1
Bologna	2–1	5–0	2–0		3–1	3–1	1–0	3–2	0–1	1–1	0–3	4–1	2–2	3–1	3–1	0–1	2–3	2–0
Fiorentina	3–1	4–1	4–2	2–1		2–0	2–0	1–0	0–0	2–2	1–1	2–1	1–0	5–0	3–1	4–0	3–1	2–1
Genoa	1–0	1–1	1–0	0–2	0–0		1–3	2–6	0–2	2–4	0–2	0–0	0–0	1–1	1–0	1–2	0–1	0–0
Internazionale	3–1	2–0	0–0	2–1	2–0	2–0		0–3	4–0	1–1	0–0	3–1	6–3	3–3	1–3	0–0	2–1	3–3
Juventus	7–0	0–1	2–0	3–0	3–1	2–0	1–0		4–1	2–0	3–1	4–2	5–1	2–1	4–0	2–2	3–1	4–3
Vicenza	0–0	1–0	0–0	1–1	1–1	1–0	0–2	1–2		3–2	1–2	0–0	1–0	3–0	5–0	2–0	3–1	1–0
Lazio	2–0	1–1	1–1	1–3	0–5	0–0	0–2	0–2	2–1		0–1	2–1	2–0	2–1	0–1	3–1	3–1	2–1
Milan	3–1	2–1	2–0	2–2	0–0	2–1	5–3	0–2	2–0	1–0		3–1	3–2	0–0	1–1	4–0	3–1	3–1
Napoli	1–1	1–0	1–2	2–0	0–4	0–2	1–1	2–1	3–1	0–0	1–1		1–2	2–1	1–0	1–1	0–3	1–1
Padova	1–1	0–0	1–0	2–0	1–0	2–1	3–0	0–4	2–1	2–0	2–0	1–2		1–0	1–0	4–1	6–3	6–1
Palermo	4–0	1–0	1–1	0–0	0–4	1–1	1–1	1–1	1–0	0–0	1–0	0–0	0–0		4–2	2–1	1–1	0–0
Roma	1–0	3–0	3–2	1–2	1–2	1–0	3–1	2–2	3–1	3–0	2–2	3–0	1–0	1–1		6–1	1–1	2–2
Sampdoria	0–0	4–0	1–0	1–0	2–1	3–0	0–0	0–2	2–2	4–0	2–1	0–2	1–1	0–0	3–0		0–2	3–1
SPAL	0–0	1–0	3–1	0–0	1–0	0–0	0–0	3–6	2–1	1–1	0–3	2–2	1–1	1–0	2–1	1–1		2–1
Udinese	1–1	1–1	0–1	1–0	0–2	2–2	1–1	1–1	2–2	1–0	2–2	0–0	2–1	1–0	3–3	1–1	3–2	

Source: Almanacco Illustrato del Calcio - La Storia 1898-2004, Panini Edizioni, Modena, September 2005 (in Italian)
Legend: Blue = home team win; Yellow = draw; Red = away team win.

== Top goalscorers ==
Rank	Player	Club	Goals
1	(Argentina) (Italy) Omar Sívori	Juventus	28
2	(Sweden) Kurt Hamrin	Fiorentina	26
3	(Wales) John Charles	Juventus	23
4	(Italy) Sergio Brighenti	Padova	21
5	(Brazil) (Italy) José Altafini	Milan	20
6	(Argentina) Pedro Manfredini	Roma	16
7	(Italy) Lorenzo Bettini	Udinese	14
7	(Italy) Gino Pivatelli	Bologna	14
7	(Italy) Paolo Erba	Bari	14
10	(Sweden) Arne Selmosson	Roma	13
10	(Italy) Orlando Rozzoni	Lazio	13
12	(Italy) Mario Tortul	Padova	12
12	(Italy) Eddie Firmani	Internazionale	12
14	(Argentina) (Italy) Antonio Valentín Angelillo	Internazionale	11
14	(Sweden) Bengt Lindskog	Internazionale	11
14	(Italy) Egidio Morbello	SPAL	11
14	(Italy) Oliviero Conti	Vicenza	11

== References and sources ==
- Almanacco Illustrato del Calcio - La Storia 1898-2004, Panini Edizioni, Modena, September 2005
