= 1960–61 Serie A =

58th season of top-tier Italian football

Serie A
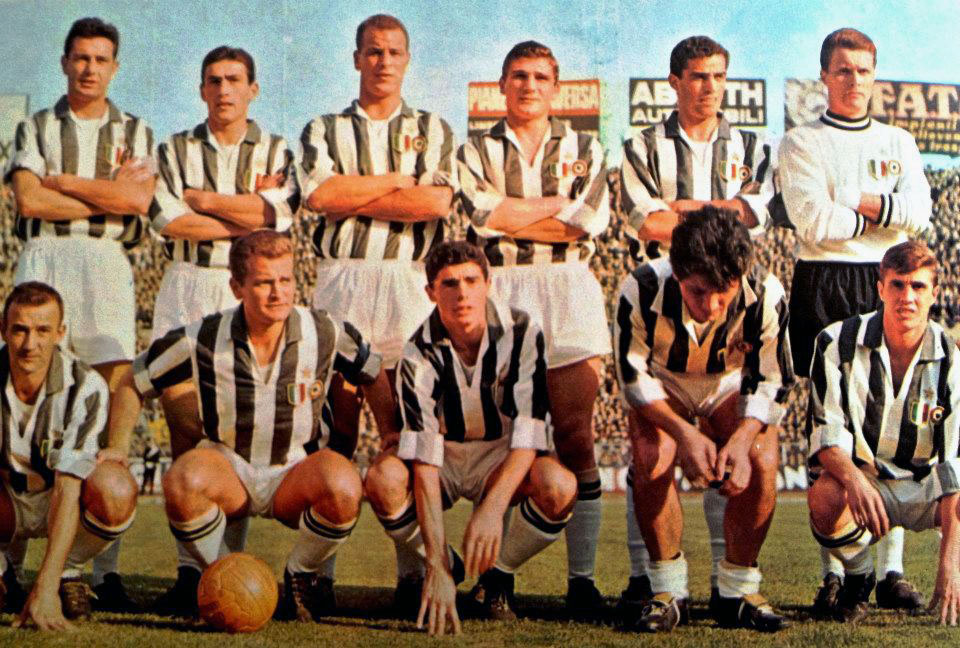
- 1960–61 Juventus team
- Season: 1960–61
- Champions: Juventus; 12th title
- Relegated: Bari; Napoli; Lazio
- European Cup: Juventus
- Cup Winners' Cup: Fiorentina
- Inter-Cities Fairs Cup: Milan; Internazionale; Roma
- Matches: 306
- Goals: 814 (2.66 per match)
- Top goalscorer: Sergio Brighenti (27 goals)

The 1960–61 Serie A season was won by Juventus.

Serie A 1960-61 team distribution

== Teams ==
Torino, Lecco and Catania had been promoted from Serie B.

== Final classification ==
Pos	Team	Pld	W	D	L	GF	GA	GD	Pts	Qualification or relegation
1	Juventus (C)	34	22	5	7	80	42	+38	49	Qualified for the European Cup
2	Milan	34	18	9	7	65	39	+26	45	Invited for the Inter-Cities Fairs Cup
3	Internazionale	34	18	8	8	73	39	+34	44	Invited for the Inter-Cities Fairs Cup
4	Sampdoria	34	17	7	10	54	51	+3	41	
5	Roma (Note: Roma qualified as holders.)	34	16	7	11	58	46	+12	39	Invited for the Inter-Cities Fairs Cup
6	Padova	34	16	6	12	47	40	+7	38	
7	Fiorentina	34	13	11	10	46	34	+12	37	Qualified for the Cup Winners' Cup
8	Catania	34	15	6	13	45	44	+1	36	
9	Bologna	34	10	11	13	44	51	−7	31	
9	Atalanta	34	9	13	12	35	41	−6	31	
9	Vicenza	34	10	11	13	35	46	−11	31	
12	Torino	34	9	12	13	34	41	−7	30	
12	SPAL	34	10	10	14	39	50	−11	30	
14	Lecco	34	10	9	15	33	49	−16	29	Relegation tie-breaker
15	Udinese	34	9	11	14	39	53	−14	29	Relegation tie-breaker
16	Bari (R)	34	9	11	14	27	38	−11	29	Relegated to Serie B after tie-breaker
17	Napoli (R)	34	7	11	16	30	47	−17	25	Relegated to Serie B
18	Lazio (R)	34	5	8	21	30	63	−33	18	Relegated to Serie B

Source: Panini
(C) Champions; (R) Relegated

== Results ==
Home \ Away	ATA	BAR	BOL	CTN	FIO	INT	JUV	LRV	LAZ	LCO	MIL	NAP	PAD	ROM	SAM	SPA	TOR	UDI
Atalanta		2–0	1–1	1–0	4–1	1–5	2–2	1–0	0–0	3–0	2–0	1–1	1–0	0–0	0–3	1–1	1–1	1–1
Bari	2–2		1–3	0–1	0–0	1–1	0–1	1–1	0–0	4–1	0–0	1–0	1–0	0–3	1–0	2–0	1–0	2–1
Bologna	3–1	0–0		1–2	3–3	2–1	2–4	1–1	1–1	0–0	0–2	0–2	2–1	2–0	4–4	3–1	3–1	1–1
Catania	3–1	3–1	1–0		1–1	2–0	1–2	4–0	0–1	2–0	4–3	1–0	2–0	1–1	3–0	1–1	0–0	3–0
Fiorentina	0–1	4–0	3–1	2–0		1–1	3–0	0–1	4–0	4–0	2–0	0–0	2–0	0–1	1–0	0–3	1–1	3–0
Internazionale	2–1	2–1	0–0	5–0	2–2		3–1	5–0	7–0	1–1	1–2	3–0	1–2	3–1	3–0	4–1	1–1	1–0
Juventus	3–2	1–1	3–0	4–1	3–0	9–1		2–0	3–1	4–2	3–4	2–2	2–1	3–0	3–2	1–0	1–0	5–1
Vicenza	1–0	4–1	2–2	1–0	0–0	1–3	0–1		0–0	1–0	1–0	2–3	2–1	4–0	1–1	1–0	1–1	2–2
Lazio	1–2	0–1	1–3	2–2	1–2	0–0	1–4	1–1		0–1	0–1	1–1	1–2	0–4	0–1	4–0	1–0	0–1
Lecco	1–0	0–0	2–0	2–2	0–2	2–1	2–2	0–1	2–1		2–2	1–0	2–1	0–0	1–1	2–0	2–1	3–1
Milan	0–0	1–3	5–1	3–0	4–1	0–1	3–1	0–0	5–1	1–1		2–1	3–0	2–1	3–1	4–0	2–0	3–1
Napoli	0–0	1–0	1–2	0–1	1–0	0–0	0–4	0–0	2–5	3–1	1–2		1–2	3–2	1–0	0–2	1–1	2–2
Padova	3–0	1–1	2–1	2–1	0–0	2–1	1–0	2–1	2–1	3–1	4–1	2–0		0–0	3–0	1–1	5–1	1–0
Roma	0–0	1–0	1–0	4–1	1–3	0–2	2–1	6–3	1–2	1–0	2–2	2–0	3–1		3–2	2–1	2–1	6–1
Sampdoria	1–0	1–0	2–1	2–0	3–1	4–2	3–2	3–1	1–0	1–0	2–2	0–0	3–0	3–2		1–1	2–1	3–2
SPAL	2–1	1–0	0–1	2–0	2–0	1–3	1–2	2–1	3–2	1–0	1–2	3–2	1–1	2–2	2–2		0–0	1–1
Torino	1–1	2–1	1–0	2–1	0–0	0–1	0–0	2–0	4–1	3–1	1–1	1–0	0–0	1–3	0–1	3–2		3–1
Udinese	2–1	0–0	0–0	0–1	0–0	0–6	0–1	1–0	2–0	2–0	0–0	1–1	3–1	2–1	7–1	0–0	3–0	

Source: Almanacco Illustrato del Calcio - La Storia 1898-2004, Panini Edizioni, Modena, September 2005 (in Italian)
Legend: Blue = home team win; Yellow = draw; Red = away team win.

== Relegation tie-breaker ==
11 June 1961

Bari	2–4	Lecco
Catalano 48'; Erba 67'		Abbadie 21'; Savioni 60', 73'; Cardoni 65'

Stadio Comunale, Bologna
Referee: Pietro Bonetto

14 June 1961

Bari	0–0	Udinese

Stadio Comunale, Bologna
Referee: Giuseppe Adami

18 June 1961

Lecco	3–3	Udinese
Clerici 13'; Bonacchi 47'; Arienti 82'		Segato 27'; Mereghetti 67'; Bettini 84'

Stadio Comunale, Bologna
Referee: Concetto Lo Bello

Bari relegated to Serie B.

== Top goalscorers ==
Rank	Player	Club	Goals
1	(Italy) Sergio Brighenti	Sampdoria	27
2	(Argentina) (Italy) Omar Sívori	Juventus	25
3	(Brazil) (Italy) José Altafini	Milan	21
4	(Argentina) Pedro Manfredini	Roma	20
5	(Italy) Aurelio Milani	Padova	18
6	(Italy) Eddie Firmani	Internazionale	16
7	(Wales) John Charles	Juventus	15
8	(Italy) Bruno Mora	Sampdoria, Juventus	14
8	(Sweden) Kurt Hamrin	Fiorentina	14
8	(Italy) Lorenzo Bettini	Udinese	14
11	(Argentina) Santiago Vernazza	Milan	13
11	(Argentina) Oscar Massei	SPAL	13
11	(Italy) Bruno Nicolè	Juventus	13
11	(Argentina) (Italy) Francisco Lojacono	Roma	13
15	(Italy) Adelmo Prenna	Catania	11
15	(Brazil) Luís Vinício	Bologna	11
15	(Italy) Orlando Rozzoni	Lazio	11
15	(Italy) Oliviero Conti	Vicenza	11

== References and sources ==
- Almanacco Illustrato del Calcio - La Storia 1898-2004, Panini Edizioni, Modena, September 2005
