= 1967–68 Inter Milan season =

Inter Milan
1967–68 season
- Owner: Angelo Moratti
- President: Angelo Moratti
- Manager: Helenio Herrera
- Stadium: San Siro
- Serie A: 5th
- Coppa Italia: Final group
- Top goalscorer: League: Angelo Domenghini (11); All: Domenghini (12)
| Home colours | Away colours |

During the 1967–68 season Inter Milan competed in Serie A and Coppa Italia.

== Summary ==
During summer oil tycoon and President Angelo Moratti in his 13th campaign as chairman transferred in several players to reinforce the club trying to revive La Grande Inter. Meanwhile, the club transferred out some players from the recent past such as midfielder Armando Picchi to Varese with Corso becoming Team Captain, Defender Guarneri was bought by Bologna, Jair was on loan by Roma.

Young players made their debut this season such as: Ferruccio Mazzola ( Sandro Mazzola younger brother). Moratti transferred in from Milan the Peruvian midfielder Benítez and Danish Forward Harald Nielsen from Bologna.

After the end of the season, President and Owner Angelo Moratti left the club to Ivanoe Fraizzoli appointed as his replacement: a well-known fan of the Beneamata.

== Squad ==
Note: Flags indicate national team as defined under FIFA eligibility rules; some limited exceptions apply. Players may hold more than one non-FIFA nationality.

| Pos. | Nation | Player |
|---|---|---|
| GK | ITA | Giuliano Sarti |
| GK | ITA | Ferdinando Miniussi |
| DF | ITA | Tarcisio Burgnich |
| DF | ITA | Giacinto Facchetti |
| DF | ITA | Spartaco Landini |
| DF | ITA | Sergio Santarini |
| DF | ITA | Pietro Dotti |
| DF | ITA | Aldo Bet |
| DF | ITA | Emilio Monaldi |
| DF | ITA | Mario Facco |
| MF | ITA | Gianfranco Bedin |

| Pos. | Nation | Player |
|---|---|---|
| MF | ESP | Luis Suárez |
| MF | ITA | Mario Corso |
| MF | ITA | Sandro Mazzola |
| MF | PER | Victor Benitez |
| MF | ITA | Marco Achilli |
| MF | ITA | Ferruccio Mazzola |
| FW | ITA | Angelo Domenghini |
| FW | ITA | Renato Cappellini |
| FW | ITA | Vito D'Amato |
| FW | ITA | Aquilino Bonfanti |
| MF | DEN | Harald Nielsen |

=== Transfers ===
In
| Pos. | Name | from | Type |
|---|---|---|---|
| FW | Harald Nielsen | Bologna | |
| MF | Victor Benitez | Venezia | |
| DF | Sergio Santarini | Rimini | |
| DF | Pietro Dotti | Atalanta | |
| FW | Vito D'Amato | SS Lazio | |
| FW | Aquilino Bonfanti | Lecco | |

Out
| Pos. | Name | To | Type |
|---|---|---|---|
| FW | Jair da Costa | AS Roma | |
| FW | Luís Vinício | Lanerossi Vicenza | |
| DF | Armando Picchi | Varese | |
| DF | Aristide Guarneri | Bologna FC | |
| MF | Renato Dehò | Lecco | |
| MF | Mario Mereghetti | Varese | |
| FW | Mauro Bicicli | Lanerossi Vicenza | |
| FW | Carlo Soldo | SS Lazio | |
| FW | Gabriele Gualazzini | | |

== Competitions ==
=== Serie A ===
==== League table ====
| Pos | Team | Pld | W | D | L | GF | GA | GD | Pts | Qualification or relegation |
|---|---|---|---|---|---|---|---|---|---|---|
| 3 | Juventus | 30 | 13 | 10 | 7 | 33 | 29 | +4 | 36 | Qualified to Inter-Cities Fairs Cup |
| 4 | Fiorentina | 30 | 13 | 9 | 8 | 35 | 23 | +12 | 35 | Qualified to Inter-Cities Fairs Cup |
| 5 | Internazionale | 30 | 13 | 7 | 10 | 46 | 34 | +12 | 33 | |
| 5 | Bologna | 30 | 11 | 11 | 8 | 30 | 23 | +7 | 33 | Qualified to Inter-Cities Fairs Cup |
| 7 | Torino | 30 | 12 | 8 | 10 | 44 | 31 | +13 | 32 | Qualification to Cup Winners' Cup |

Source: Panini

==== Results by round ====
| Round | 1 | 2 | 3 | 4 | 5 | 6 | 7 | 8 | 9 | 10 | 11 | 12 | 13 | 14 | 15 | 16 | 17 | 18 | 19 | 20 | 21 | 22 | 23 | 24 | 25 | 26 | 27 | 28 | 29 | 30 |
|---|---|---|---|---|---|---|---|---|---|---|---|---|---|---|---|---|---|---|---|---|---|---|---|---|---|---|---|---|---|---|
| Ground | H | A | H | A | H | A | H | A | H | A | H | H | A | A | H | A | H | A | H | A | H | A | H | A | H | A | A | H | H | A |
| Result | D | D | W | L | D | L | W | L | W | D | W | W | L | L | L | W | W | L | W | D | W | L | W | W | W | W | D | D | L | L |
| Position | 8 | 7 | 4 | 6 | 8 | 11 | 8 | 9 | 7 | 7 | 5 | 2 | 7 | 8 | 10 | 8 | 7 | 8 | 7 | 6 | 5 | 7 | 6 | 6 | 5 | 2 | 2 | 3 | 5 | 5 |

Source: http://calcio-seriea.net/allenatori_squadra/1967/630/
A = Away; H = Home; W = Win; D = Draw; L = Loss; = Leader, European Cup; = Qualified to 1968–69 Inter-Cities Fairs Cup; = Relegation to 1968–69 Serie B

According to the UEFA rules Inter Milan not qualified to the 1968-69 Inter-Cities Fairs Cup consequently to AC Milan qualification to the 1968–69 European Cup.

==== Matches ====
- .- Source:http://calcio-seriea.net/partite/1967/630/

| 24 September 1967 1 | Inter Milan | 1–1 | AS Roma | Milan |
| | Facchetti 7' | | 9' Taccola | Stadium: San Siro; Attendance: 70,000; Referee: De Robbio (Torre Annunziata) |

| 1 October 1967 2 | Mantova 1911 | 0–0 | Inter Milan | Mantua |
| | | | | Stadium: Martelli; Attendance: 30,000; Referee: D'Agostini |

| 8 October 1967 3 | Inter Milan | 1–0 | Lanerossi Vicenza | Milan |
| | Mazzola 16' | | | Stadium: San Siro; Attendance: 45,000; Referee: Bernardis |

| 15 October 1967 4 | Atalanta | 3–1 | Inter Milan | Bergamo |
| | Danova 10'; Savoldi 22'; Dell'Angelo 29' | | 17' Nielsen | Stadium: Comunale; Attendance: 27,000; Referee: Angonese |

| 22 October 1967 5 | Inter Milan | 1–1 | Milan | Milan |
| | Benitez 58' | | 78' Rivera | Stadium: San Siro; Attendance: 80,000; Referee: D'Agostini |

| 29 October 1967 6 | Varese | 1–0 | Inter Milan | Varese |
| | Mereghetti 62' | | | Stadium: Ossola; Referee: Monti (Ancona) |

| 5 November 1967 7 | Inter Milan | 1–0 | Bologna | Milan |
| | Suárez 51' (pen.) | | | Stadium: San Siro; Referee: Sbardella |

| 12 November 1967 8 | Brescia | 2–0 | Inter Milan | Brescia |
| | Fumagalli 3'; Salvi 63' | | | Stadium: Mario Rigamonti; Referee: Lo Bello |

| 26 November 1967 9 | Inter Milan | 2–0 | SPAL | Milan |
| | Massei 13' (o.g.); Bonfanti 61' | | | Stadium: San Siro; Referee: De Marchi |

| 3 December 1967 10 | Fiorentina | 1–1 | Inter Milan | Florence |
| | Amarildo 24' | | 29' Domenghini | Stadium: Comunale; Referee: Pieroni |

| 9 December 1967 11 | Inter Milan | 1–0 | Torino | Milan |
| | Dotti 85' | | | Stadium: San Siro; Referee: Angonese |

| 17 December 1967 12 | Inter Milan | 2–0 | Sampdoria | Milan |
| | Domenghini 57', 78' | | | Stadium: San Siro; Referee: Toselli |

| 31 December 1967 13 | Juventus | 3–2 | Inter Milan | Turin |
| | Leoncini 14'; De Paoli 60'; Bercellino 75' (pen.) | | 17' Domenghini; 89' Cappellini | Stadium: Comunale; Referee: Monti |

| 7 January 1968 14 | SSC Napoli | 2–1 | Inter Milan | Naples |
| | Altafini 6'; Bianchi 43' | | 33' Cappellini | Stadium: Stadio San Paolo; Referee: Lo Bello |

| 14 January 1968 15 | Inter Milan | 0–2 | Cagliari | Milan |
| | | | | Stadium: San Siro; Referee: De Robbio |

| 21 January 1968 16 | AS Roma | 2–6 | Inter Milan | Rome |
| | Enzo 50'; Scaratti 83' | | 16' Cappellini; 60' Domenghini; 64', 89' Corso; 73', 85' Mazzola | Stadium: Olimpico; Referee: Angonese |

| 28 January 1968 17 | Inter Milan | 3–0 | Mantova 1911 | Milan |
| | Giagnoni 9' (o.g.); Bedin 14', 51' | | | Stadium: San Siro; Referee: De Marchi |

| 4 February 1968 18 | Lanerossi Vicenza | 2–1 | Inter Milan | Vicenza |
| | Vinicio 3', 62' | | 63' Facchetti | Stadium: Romeo Menti; Referee: D'Agostini |

| 11 February 1968 19 | Inter Milan | 3–0 | Atalanta | Milan |
| | Mazzola 58'; Domenghini 70'; Facchetti 88' | | | Stadium: San Siro; Referee: Sbardella |

| 18 February 1968 20 | AC Milan | 1–1 | Inter Milan | Milan |
| | Hamrin 27' | | 2' Cappellini | Stadium: San Siro; Referee: Lo Bello (Siracusa) |

| 25 February 1968 21 | Inter Milan | 1–0 | Varese | Milan |
| | Mazzola 40' | | | Stadium: San Siro; Referee: Pieroni |

| 3 March 1968 22 | Bologna | 2–1 | Inter Milan | Bologna |
| | Perani 9', 61' | | 31' Domenghini | Stadium: Comunale; Referee: D'Agostini |

| 10 March 1968 23 | Inter Milan | 3–0 | Brescia | Milan |
| | Nielsen 33'; Domenghini 53', 83' | | | Stadium: San Siro; Referee: Francescon |

| 17 March 1968 24 | SPAL | 1–2 | Inter Milan | Ferrara |
| | Brenna 54' | | 39' Facchetti; 69' Suarez | Stadium: Comunale; Referee: Monti |

| 24 March 1968 25 | Inter Milan | 3–1 | Fiorentina | Milan |
| | Mazzola 18'; D'Amato 35'; Domenghini 48' | | 32' Maraschi | Stadium: San Siro; Referee: D'Agostini |

| 31 March 1968 26 | Torino | 2–3 | Inter Milan | Turin |
| | Poletti 19' (pen.); Combin 21' | | 26', 75' Facchetti; 64' Domenghini | Stadium: Comunale; Referee: Bernardis (Trieste) |

| 14 April 1968 27 | Sampdoria | 2–2 | Inter Milan | Genoa |
| | Vieri 47'; Delfino 83' | | 12' Cappellini; 35' Facchetti | Stadium: Luigi Ferraris; Referee: De Robbio |

| 28 April 1968 28 | Inter Milan | 0–0 | Juventus | Milan |
| | | | | Stadium: San Siro; Referee: Pieroni |

| 5 May 1968 29 | Inter Milan | 1–2 | SSC Napoli | Milan |
| | Montefusco 88' (o.g.) | | 5' Cané; 20' Barison | Stadium: San Siro; Referee: Bernardis |

| 12 May 1968 30 | Cagliari | 3–2 | Inter Milan | Cagliari |
| | Boninsegna 46'; Greatti 59'; Riva 79' | | 22', 29' Cappellini | Stadium: Amsicora; Referee: Sbardella |

=== Coppa Italia ===
==== Preliminary round ====
| 10 September 1967 1 | Inter Milan | 4–2 | Brescia | Milan |
| | Burgnich 11'; Mazzola 29' (pen.), 72'; Nielsen 51' | | 73' Troja; 74' Gilardoni | Stadium: San Siro; Referee: Marengo |

| 8 November 1967 2 | Inter Milan | 4–1 | Atalanta | Milan |
| | Santarini 56'; Domenghini 60'; Corso 69' (pen.); D'Amato 81' | | 24' Tiberi | Stadium: San Siro; Referee: Toselli |

==== Quarterfinals ====
| 13 December 1967 1 | Pisa | 1–1 | Inter Milan | Pisa |
| | Manservisi 72' | | 47' Facchetti | Stadium: Arena Garibaldi; Referee: Barbaresco |

| 24 January 1968 2 | Inter Milan | 1–0 | Pisa | Milan |
| | Bonfanti 69' | | | Stadium: San Siro; Referee: Vitullo |

==== Final group ====
| Pos | Team | Pld | W | D | L | GF | GA | GD | Pts |
|---|---|---|---|---|---|---|---|---|---|
| 1 | Torino | 6 | 3 | 3 | 0 | 9 | 2 | +7 | 9 |
| 2 | AC Milan | 6 | 2 | 3 | 1 | 8 | 6 | +2 | 7 |
| 3 | Inter Milan | 6 | 1 | 2 | 3 | 7 | 10 | −3 | 4 |
| 4 | Bologna | 6 | 1 | 2 | 3 | 6 | 12 | −6 | 4 |

===== Matches =====
| 13 June 1968 1 | Inter Milan | 3–3 | Bologna | Milan |
| | Ardizzon 55'; Cappellini 68'; Bedin 75' | | 3' Tentorio; 42' Pace; 51' Clerici | Stadium: San Siro; Referee: De Marchi |

| 16 June 1968 2 | Inter Milan | 0–0 | AC Milan | Milan |
| | | | | Stadium: San Siro; Referee: Monti |

| 19 June 1968 3 | Torino | 1–0 | Inter Milan | Turin |
| | Dotti 28' (o.g.) | | | Stadium: Comunale; Referee: Toselli |

| 23 June 1968 4 | Bologna | 0–2 | Inter Milan | Bologna |
| | | | 6' Suarez; 30' Facchetti | Stadium: Comunale; Referee: Pieroni |

| 26 June 1968 5 | AC Milan | 4–2 | Inter Milan | Milan |
| | Sormani 30'; Hamrin 52'; Schnellinger 78'; Rosato 86' | | 3' Nielsen; 66' Achilli | Stadium: San Siro; Referee: Bernardis |

| 30 June 1968 6 | Inter Milan | 0–2 | Torino | Milan |
| | | | 17' Fossati; 45' Combin | Stadium: San Siro; Referee: D'Agostini |

== Statistics ==
=== Players statistics ===
| No. | Pos | Nat | Player | Total | | Serie A | | Coppa | |
| No. | Pos | Nat | Player | Apps | Goals | Apps | Goals | Apps | Goals |
|---|---|---|---|---|---|---|---|---|---|
| | GK | (Italy) ITA | Giuliano Sarti | 38 | -44 | 29 | −32 | 9 | -12 |
| | DF | (Italy) ITA | Tarcisio Burgnich | 36 | 1 | 30 | 0 | 6 | 1 |
| | DF | (Italy) ITA | Giacinto Facchetti | 37 | 9 | 28 | 7 | 9 | 2 |
| | DF | (Italy) ITA | Spartaco Landini | 34 | 0 | 24 | 0 | 10 | 0 |
| | DF | (Italy) ITA | Sergio Santarini | 20 | 1 | 14 | 0 | 6 | 1 |
| | MF | (Spain) ESP | Luis Suárez | 38 | 3 | 29 | 2 | 9 | 1 |
| | MF | (Italy) ITA | Sandro Mazzola | 37 | 8 | 28 | 6 | 9 | 2 |
| | MF | (Italy) ITA | Mario Corso | 31 | 3 | 24 | 2 | 7 | 1 |
| | MF | (Italy) ITA | Gianfranco Bedin | 21 | 3 | 14 | 2 | 7 | 1 |
| | FW | (Italy) ITA | Angelo Domenghini | 34 | 12 | 26 | 11 | 8 | 1 |
| | FW | (Italy) ITA | Renato Cappellini | 24 | 8 | 19 | 7 | 5 | 1 |
| | GK | (Italy) ITA | Ferdinando Miniussi | 1 | 0 | 1 | −0 | | |
| | FW | (Italy) ITA | Vito D'Amato | 18 | 2 | 13 | 1 | 5 | 1 |
| | DF | (Italy) ITA | Pietro Dotti | 19 | 1 | 13 | 1 | 6 | 0 |
| | MF | (Peru) PER | Victor Benitez | 14 | 1 | 8 | 1 | 6 | 0 |
| | DF | (Italy) ITA | Aldo Bet | 8 | 0 | 8 | 0 | | |
| | MF | (Denmark) DEN | Harald Nielsen | 13 | 4 | 8 | 2 | 5 | 2 |
| | FW | (Italy) ITA | Aquilino Bonfanti | 10 | 2 | 7 | 1 | 3 | 1 |
| | DF | (Italy) ITA | Emilio Monaldi | 6 | 0 | 5 | 0 | 1 | 0 |
| | MF | (Italy) ITA | Marco Achilli | 3 | 1 | 1 | 0 | 2 | 1 |
| | MF | (Italy) ITA | Ferruccio Mazzola | 1 | 0 | 1 | 0 | | |
| | GK | (Italy) ITA | Dario Barluzzi | 2 | -2 | 0 | −0 | 2 | -2 |
| | GK | (Italy) ITA | Luigi Reali | 0 | 0 | 0 | −0 | | |
| | GK | (Italy) ITA | Gianpietro Fontana | 0 | 0 | 0 | −0 | | |
| | MF | (Italy) ITA | Mario Facco | 2 | 0 | 0 | 0 | 2 | 0 |
| | MF | (Italy) ITA | Poli | 3 | 0 | 0 | 0 | 3 | 0 |

- Source: http://calcio-seriea.net/presenze/1967/630/
