= 1966–67 Inter Milan season =

Football Club Internazionale Milano
1966–67 season
- President: Angelo Moratti
- Manager: Helenio Herrera
- Stadium: San Siro
- Serie A: 2nd
- Coppa Italia: Semifinals
- European Cup: Runners-up
- Top goalscorer: League: Sandro Mazzola (17); All: Mazzola (22)
- Highest home attendance: 76,906 vs. Milan (2 April 1967)
- Lowest home attendance: 24,979 vs. Mantova (22 January 1967)
- Average home league attendance: 45,541
Home colours	Away colours	Third colours

During the season 1966–67 Football Club Internazionale Milano competed in Serie A, Coppa Italia and European Cup.

== Summary ==
After winning the league the previous season, the Nerazzuri tried the transfers of 21-year old German midfielder Franz Beckenbauer from Bayern München and Portuguese striker Eusébio from Benfica, both players having a remarkable World Cup in England that summer. However, Italian Federation of Football banned the arrivals of foreign players — due to the flop of National Italian Team at 1966 FIFA World Cup defeated by Asian newcomers North Korea — resulting in a 14 years measure lifted up until 1980. So, the club changes its plans and signed new player : Brazilian Luís Vinício replacing Spanish Peiró, transferred out to Roma. A debut of young player Dehò, disputing only one match .

With advisor manager Allodi, President Angelo Moratti tried to transfer Riva in from Cagliari: manager Herrera approved the transfer, Rombo di Tuono with a loan to Bologna in exchange of Pascutti. Although, club official Schiavio was opposed to the accord with a dimition on the table presented.

The campaign is remembered as the end of the Grande Inter era, as the squad finished the league campaign by winning none of its last six games (included 3 of them at home), paving the way to Juventus to clinch the title by a mere point on the final day of the league season. In European Cup, the team advanced to the Final, but with right winger Jair da Costa gone and Luis Suárez injured, they lost the European Cup 2–1 to Celtic Glasgow.

During the season the club changed its denomination Football Club Internazionale to Football Club Internazionale Milano.

== Squad ==
Note: Flags indicate national team as defined under FIFA eligibility rules; some limited exceptions apply. Players may hold more than one non-FIFA nationality.

Pos.	Nation	Player
GK	ITA	Giuliano Sarti
GK	ITA	Ferdinando Miniussi
DF	ITA	Giacinto Facchetti
DF	ITA	Tarcisio Burgnich
DF	ITA	Armando Picchi
DF	ITA	Spartaco Landini
DF	ITA	Mario Facco
DF	ITA	Aristide Guarneri
MF	ITA	Sandro Mazzola
MF	ITA	Mario Corso
MF	ESP	Luis Suárez

Pos.	Nation	Player
MF	ITA	Gianfranco Bedin
MF	ITA	Renato Dehò
MF	ITA	Mario Mereghetti
FW	ITA	Angelo Domenghini
FW	BRA	Jair da Costa
FW	ITA	Renato Cappellini
FW	BRA	Luís Vinício
FW	ITA	Mauro Bicicli
FW	ITA	Carlo Soldo
FW	ITA	Gabriele Gualazzini

=== Transfers ===
In
Pos.	Name	from	Type
DF	Renato Deho		
FW	Luis Vinicio	Lanerossi	
FW	Mauro Bicicli	Genoa C.F.C.	
FW	Carlo Soldo	Varese Calcio	

Out
Pos.	Name	To	Type
GK	Ottavio Bugatti		retired
DF	Saul Malatrasi	U.S. Lecce	
MF	Franco Cordova	Brescia Calcio	
FW	Sergio Gori	Lanerossi	
MF	Joaquin Peiro	AS Roma	

== Competitions ==
=== Serie A ===
==== League table ====
Pos	Team	Pld	W	D	L	GF	GA	GD	Pts	Qualification or relegation
1	Juventus (C)	34	18	13	3	44	19	+25	49	Qualification to European Cup
2	Internazionale	34	19	10	5	59	22	+37	48	
3	Bologna	34	18	9	7	48	27	+21	45	Chosen for Inter-Cities Fairs Cup
4	Napoli	34	17	10	7	46	23	+23	44	Chosen for Inter-Cities Fairs Cup
5	Fiorentina	34	15	13	6	53	29	+24	43	Chosen for Inter-Cities Fairs Cup

Source: Panini
(C) Champions

==== Results by round ====
Round	1	2	3	4	5	6	7	8	9	10	11	12	13	14	15	16	17	18	19	20	21	22	23	24	25	26	27	28	29	30	31	32	33	34
Ground	A	H	A	H	A	H	A	H	A	A	H	A	H	H	A	A	H	H	A	H	A	H	A	H	A	H	H	A	H	A	A	H	H	A
Result	W	W	W	W	W	W	W	D	W	L	W	L	W	D	D	W	D	W	W	W	W	D	W	L	D	W	W	W	D	D	L	D	D	L
Position	1	1	1	1	1	1	1	1	1	1	1	1	1	1	1	1	1	1	1	1	1	1	1	1	1	1	1	1	1	1	1	1	1	2

Source: Competitive matches
A = Away; H = Home; W = Win; D = Draw; L = Loss; = Leader, European Cup; = 1967–68 Inter-Cities Fairs Cup; = Relegation to 1967-68 Serie B

According to the UEFA rules Inter Milan not qualified to the 1967-68 Inter-Cities Fairs Cup consequently to AC Milan qualification to the 1967–68 European Cup Winners' Cup.

==== Matches ====
18 September 1966 1	Foggia	0–4	Inter Milan	Foggia
		Report	18', 23', 85' Mazzola; 63' Vinicio	Stadium: Stadio Pino Zaccheria; Referee: Fulvio Pieroni

25 September 1966 2	Inter Milan	2–0	Lanerossi Vicenza	Milan
	Facchetti 12'; Jair 51'	Report		Stadium: Stadio San Siro; Referee: Alessandro D'Agostini

2 October 1966 3	Atalanta	0–5	Inter Milan	Bergamo
		Report	52', 71' Mazzola; 60', 88' Domenghini; 87' (o.g.) Poppi	Stadium: Stadio Comunale; Referee: Angonese

8 October 1966 4	Inter Milan	2–1	SPAL	Milan
	Domenghini 1'; Jair 11'	Report	30' Capello	Stadium: Stadio San Siro; Referee: Francesco De Robbio

16 October 1966 5	Lecco	0–2	Inter Milan	Lecco
		Report	17' Mazzola; 26' Domenghini	Stadium: Stadio Mario Rigamonti; Referee: Lo Bello

23 October 1966 6	Inter Milan	1–0	Brescia	Milan
	Domenghini 19'	Report		Stadium: Stadio San Siro; Referee: Francesco Francescon

6 November 1966 7	Torino	0–2	Inter Milan	Turin
		Report	44' Facchetti; 77' Mazzola	Stadium: Stadio Comunale; Referee: Fulvio Pieroni

13 November 1966 8	Inter Milan	0–0	Roma	Milan
		Report		Stadium: Stadio San Siro; Referee: Sergio Gonella

20 November 1966 9	AC Milan	0–1	Inter Milan	Milan
		Report	70' (o.g.) Maddè	Stadium: Stadio San Siro; Referee: Concetto Lo Bello

4 December 1966 10	Bologna	3–2	Inter Milan	Bologna
	Pascutti 8'; Bulgarelli 54'; Perani 76'	Report	83' Corso; 86' Mazzola	Stadium: Stadio Comunale; Referee: Fulvio Pieroni

11 December 1966 11	Inter Milan	2–1	Venezia	Milan
	Mazzola 33' (pen.); Suarez 48'	Report	64' Benitez	Stadium: Stadio San Siro; Referee: Francesco De Robbio

18 December 1966 12	Lazio	1–0	Inter Milan	Rome
	D'Amato 80'	Report		Stadium: Stadio Olimpico; Referee: Francesco Francescon

25 December 1966 13	Inter Milan	2–1	Cagliari	Milan
	Jair 36'; Cappellini 77'	Report	26' Riva	Stadium: Stadio San Siro; Referee: Mario Bernardis

31 December 1966 14	Inter Milan	1–1	Juventus	Milan
	Mazzola 75'	Report	44' Menichelli	Stadium: Stadio San Siro; Referee: Antonio Sbardella

8 January 1967 15	Napoli	0–0	Inter Milan	Naples
		Report		Stadium: Stadio San Paolo; Referee: Concetto Lo Bello

15 January 1967 16	Fiorentina	1–2	Inter Milan	Florence
	Brugnera 40'	Report	41' Bedin; 64' Guarneri	Stadium: Stadio Comunale; Referee: Francesco Francescon

22 January 1967 17	Inter Milan	1–1	Mantova	Milan
	Corso 26'	Report	66' Salvemini	Stadium: Stadio San Siro; Referee: Danilo Bigi

29 January 1967 18	Inter Milan	3–0	Foggia	Milan
	Cappellini 52', 62', 85'	Report		Stadium: Stadio San Siro; Referee: Fabio Monti

5 February 1967 19	Lanerossi Vicenza	0–5	Inter Milan	Vicenza
		Report	7' Mazzola; 42', 67' Cappellini; 52' Suarez; 70' Corso	Stadium: Stadio Romeo Menti; Referee: Antonio Sbardella

11 February 1967 20	Inter Milan	2–0	Atalanta	Milan
	Mazzola 66' (pen.); Domenghini 77'	Report		Stadium: Stadio San Siro; Referee: Bernardis

19 February 1967 21	SPAL	1–3	Inter Milan	Ferrara
	Bosdaves 11'	Report	26' Facchetti; 29' Mazzola; 84' Cappellini	Stadium: Stadio Comunale; Referee: Fabio Monti

26 February 1967 22	Inter Milan	1–1	Lecco	Milan
	Bedin 64'	Report	21' Incerti	Stadium: Stadio San Siro; Referee: Antonio Vitullo

5 March 1967 23	Brescia	0–3	Inter Milan	Brescia
		Report	48' Domenghini; 67', 82' Mazzola	Stadium: Stadio Mario Rigamonti; Referee: Fulvio Pieroni

12 March 1967 24	Inter Milan	1–2	Torino	Milan
	Bicicli 60'	Report	17' Meroni; 25' Puia	Stadium: Stadio San Siro; Referee: Francesco Francescon

19 March 1967 25	Roma	0–0	Inter Milan	Rome
		Report		Stadium: Stadio Olimpico; Referee: Concetto Lo Bello

2 April 1967 26	Inter Milan	4–0	AC Milan	Milan
	Cappellini 19'; Facchetti 71'; Suarez 74'; Domenghini 75'	Report		Stadium: Stadio San Siro; Referee: Fulvio Pieroni

9 April 1967 27	Inter Milan	2–1	Bologna	Milan
	Mazzola 47'; Burgnich 84'	Report	53' Fogli	Stadium: Stadio San Siro; Referee: Fabio Monti

16 April 1967 28	Venezia	2–3	Inter Milan	Venice
	Manfredini 7'; Bertogna 40'	Report	3' Mazzola; 25' Corso; 64' Bicicli	Stadium: Stadio Pier Luigi Penzo; Referee: Antonio Sbardella

23 April 1967 29	Inter Milan	0–0	Lazio	Milan
		Report		Stadium: Stadio San Siro; Referee: Francesco De Robbio

30 April 1967 30	Cagliari	1–1	Inter Milan	Cagliari
	Nenè 79'	Report	46' Domenghini	Stadium: Stadio Amsicora; Referee: Alessandro D'Agostini

7 May 1967 31	Juventus	1–0	Inter Milan	Turin
	Favalli 71'	Report		Stadium: Stadio Comunale; Referee: Concetto Lo Bello

14 May 1967 32	Inter Milan	1–1	Napoli	Milan
	Burgnich 81'	Report	60' Altafini	Stadium: Stadio San Siro; Referee: Fulvio Pieroni

21 May 1967 33	Inter Milan	1–1	Fiorentina	Milan
	Domenghini 72'	Report	69' (o.g.) Burgnich	Stadium: Stadio San Siro; Referee: Fulvio Pieroni

1 June 1967 34	Mantova	1–0	Inter Milan	Mantova
	Di Giacomo 49'	Report		Stadium: Stadio Danilo Martelli; Referee: Francesco Francescon

=== Coppa Italia ===
==== Quarterfinals ====
4 June 1967	Inter Milan	1–0	Fiorentina	Milan
	Mazzola 60'			Stadium: Stadio San Siro; Referee: Mario Bernardis

==== Semifinals ====
7 June 1967	Padova	3–2	Inter Milan	Padua
	Carminati 29', 57'; Morelli 36'		39' Suarez; 43' Mazzola	Stadium: Stadio Silvio Appiani; Referee: D'Agostini

=== European Cup ===
==== Round of 32 ====
28 September 1966	Inter Milan	1–0	(Soviet Union) Torpedo Moscow	Milan
	Voronin 63' (o.g.)			Stadium: Stadio San Siro; Referee: (West Germany) Tschenscher

12 October 1966	(Soviet Union) Torpedo Moscow	0–0	Inter Milan	Moscow
				Stadium: Lenin Stadium; Referee: (Spain) Zariquiegui

==== Eightfinals ====
16 November 1966	Inter Milan	2–1	(Hungary) Vasas	Milan
	Soldo 60'; Corso 85'		83' Puskas	Stadium: Stadio San Siro; Referee: (Czechoslovakia) Dienst

8 December 1966	(Hungary) Vasas	0–2	Inter Milan	Budapest
			40', 66' Mazzola	Stadium: Népstadion; Referee: (West Germany) Kreitlein

==== Quarterfinals ====
15 February 1967	Inter Milan	1–0	(Spain) Real Madrid	Milan
	Cappellini 54'			Stadium: Stadio San Siro; Referee: (Austria) Wlachojanis

1 March 1967	(Spain) Real Madrid	0–2	Inter Milan	Madrid
			23' Cappellini; 57' (o.g.) Zoco	Stadium: Estadio Santiago Bernabéu; Referee: (Czechoslovakia) Dienst

==== Semifinals ====
19 April 1967	Inter Milan	1–1	(Bulgaria) CSKA Sofia	Milan
	Facchetti 45'		66' Tzanev	Stadium: Stadio San Siro; Referee: (Austria) Vlachojanis

26 April 1967	(Bulgaria) CSKA Sofia	1–1	Inter Milan	Sofia
	Radlev 78'		62' Facchetti	Stadium: Bălgarska Armija; Referee: (Spain) Zaraquiegui

3 May 1967 replay	Inter Milan	1–0	(Bulgaria) CSKA Sofia	Bologna
	Cappellini 12'			Stadium: Stadio Comunale; Referee: (Czechoslovakia) Dienst

==== Final ====
25 May 1967	Inter Milan	1–2	(Scotland) Celtic	Lisbon
	Mazzola 6'		Gemmell 62'; Chalmers 83'	Stadium: Estádio da Luz; Referee: (West Germany) Kurt Tschenscher

== Statistics ==
=== Squad statistics ===
Competition	Points	Home						Away						Total						GD
Competition	Points	G	W	D	L	Gs	Ga	G	W	D	L	Gs	Ga	G	W	D	L	Gs	Ga	GD
Serie A	48	17	9	7	1	26	11	17	10	3	4	33	11	34	19	10	5	59	22	37
Coppa Italia	–	1	1	0	0	1	0	1	0	0	1	2	3	2	1	0	1	3	3	0
European Cup	–	5	4	1	0	6	2	5	2	2	1	6	3	10	6	3	1	12	5	7
Total	–	23	14	8	1	33	13	23	12	5	6	41	17	46	26	13	7	74	30	44

=== Players statistics ===
No.	Pos	Nat	Player	Total		Serie A	
No.	Pos	Nat	Player	Apps	Goals	Apps	Goals
	GK	(Italy) ITA	Sarti	31	-21	31	−21
	DF	(Italy) ITA	Burgnich	30	2	30	2
	DF	(Italy) ITA	Picchi	31	0	31	0
	DF	(Italy) ITA	Guarneri	29	1	29	1
	DF	(Italy) ITA	Facchetti	34	4	34	4
	MF	(Italy) ITA	Corso	32	4	32	4
	MF	(Italy) ITA	Bedin	23	2	23	2
	MF	(Italy) ITA	Mazzola	30	17	30	17
	MF	(Spain) ESP	Luis Suárez	32	3	32	3
	FW	(Italy) ITA	Domenghini	29	9	29	9
	FW	(Italy) ITA	Cappellini	21	9	21	9
	GK	(Italy) ITA	Miniussi	3	-1	3	−1
	DF	(Italy) ITA	Landini	14	0	14	0
	MF	(Italy) ITA	Deho	1	0	1	0
	FW	(Brazil) BRA	Jair da Costa	15	3	15	3
	FW	(Brazil) BRA	Vinicio	8	1	8	1
	FW	(Italy) ITA	Bicicli	11	2	11	2

- Source: http://calcio-seriea.net/presenze/1966/613/

== See also ==
- History of La Grande Inter

== Bibliography ==
- Filippo Grassia; Gianpiero Lotito (2008). INTER – Dalla nascita allo scudetto del centenario. Antonio Vallardi Editore, 2008. p. 239. ISBN 978-88-95684-11-6.
