= Miniussi =

Miniussi is a surname. Notable people with the surname include:

- Christian Miniussi (born 1967), Argentine tennis player
- Ferdinando Miniussi (1940–2001), Italian footballer
