= Armando Picchi =

Italian footballer (1935–1971)

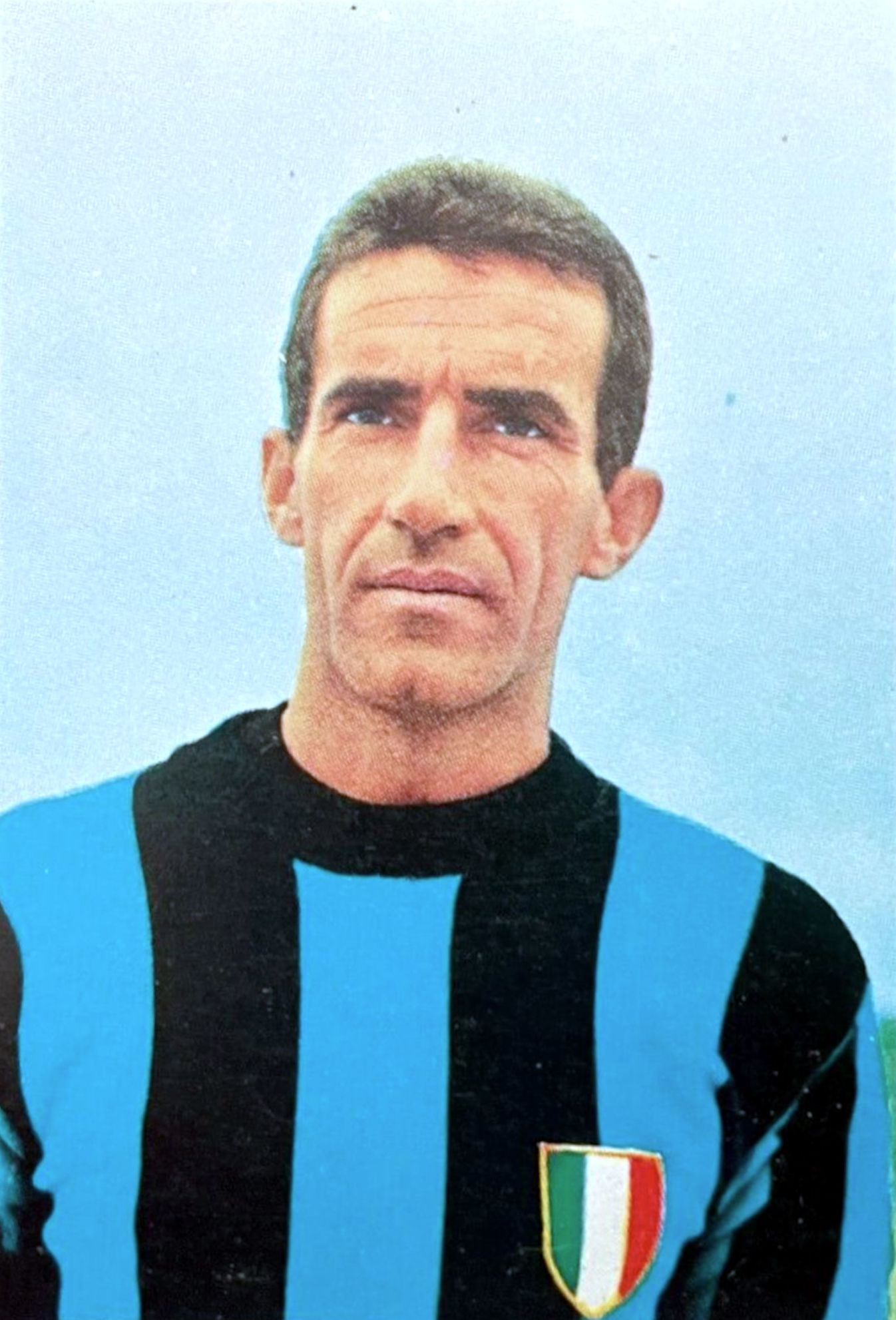
- Picchi with Inter Milan in 1965

Personal information
- Date of birth: 20 June 1935
- Place of birth: Livorno, Italy
- Date of death: 27 May 1971 (aged 35)
- Place of death: Sanremo, Italy
- Height: 1.71 m (5 ft 7 in)
- Positions: Defender; libero

Youth career
- 1949–1954: Livorno

Senior career*
Years	Team	Apps	(Gls)
1954–1959	Livorno	99	(5)
1959–1960	SPAL	27	(1)
1960–1967	Inter Milan	206	(1)
1967–1969	Varese	46	(0)
Total		378	(7)

International career
1964–1968	Italy	12	(0)

Managerial career
- 1968–1969: Varese
- 1969–1970: Livorno
- 1970–1971: Juventus
- * Club domestic league appearances and goals

Armando Picchi (Italian pronunciation: [arˈmando ˈpikki]; 20 June 1935 – 27 May 1971) was an Italian football player and coach. Regularly positioned as a libero, he captained the Inter Milan side known as "Grande Inter".

== Club career ==
=== Early career ===
Born in Livorno, Picchi started his career by playing for Livorno. In 1959, he moved to SPAL, before moving later at the peak of his time, and most of his career, to Inter Milan.

=== Captain of Grande Inter ===
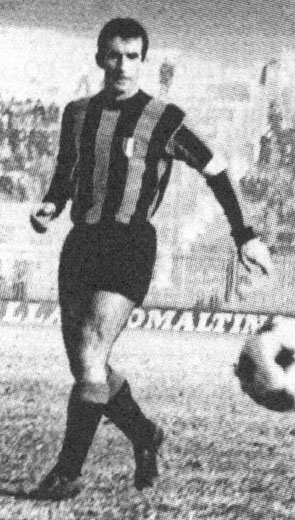
Picchi captaining Inter Milan in the mid-1960s

A versatile defender, Picchi started to play at Inter Milan as a right-back, a role he previously held at SPAL. During the course of 1961–62 season, the legendary Grande Inter coach Helenio Herrera experimented by placing him as a libero. The new position was successful; he became an important figure in the team's strong defence, and indirectly set examples for teammates Tarcisio Burgnich and Giacinto Facchetti with his leadership. During that time, Inter Milan was still captained by Bruno Bolchi. When Bolchi moved to Verona, Picchi was then selected as team captain. It was in his captaincy that Inter Milan evolved into the era famously known as Grande Inter, when they won three scudetti, two European Champions Cups and two Intercontinental Cups in the 1960s.

=== Later career ===
After his time at Inter Milan, Picchi played for two seasons at Varese before retiring in 1969, at the age of 34.

== International career ==
Picchi made his debut for Italy several months after becoming Intercontinental champion with Inter Milan, in a 6–1 victory over Finland in November 1964. However, Italy coach at that time, Edmondo Fabbri, deemed him unsuitable for the team's scheme, as he felt he was too defensive minded, and subsequently left him out of the squad for 1966 World Cup in England. Under the management of Ferruccio Valcareggi, he was regularly called for the qualifying matches of Euro 1968; however, a fractured pelvis injury in a match against Bulgaria in April 1968 ruled him out of the competition, which concluded his last match with the Azzurri, totalling 12 international appearances.

== Style of play ==
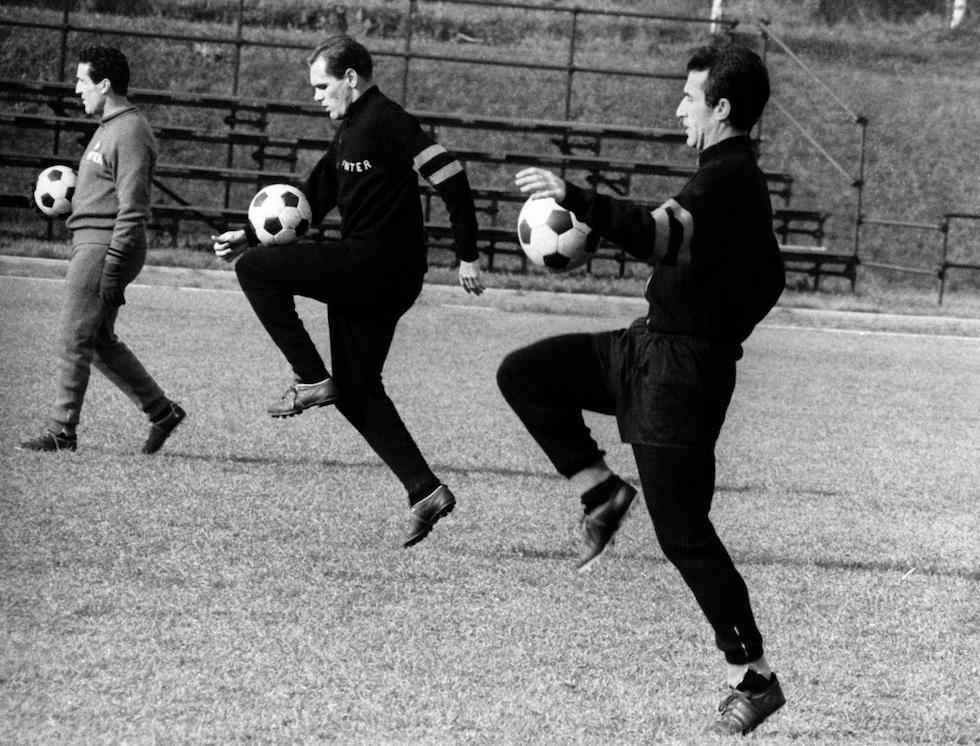
From right to left: Picchi in training for Nerazzurri in 1966 with teammate Luís Vinício and coach Helenio Herrera

A quick, versatile and tenacious defender, Picchi began his career playing as a forward or as a central defensive midfielder, before being moved to right back, where he excelled, but later came into his own in the libero role. Picchi was primarily an old-fashioned sweeper, who was mainly known for his defensive skills, strong physique, and ability to win back, intercept and clear loose balls as a last man, while he was not particularly good in the air, due to his small stature; despite his more traditional, defensive-minded interpretation of the role, he was also occasionally capable of getting forward and carrying the ball out into midfield, or starting plays from the back-line, due to his good technique and ability to read the game. Regarded as one of Italy's greatest defenders, and as one of the best sweepers of his generation, he was highly regarded for his tactical intelligence as well as vocal leadership on the pitch, and was known for his ability to organise the back-line and motivate his teammates.

== Coaching career and death ==
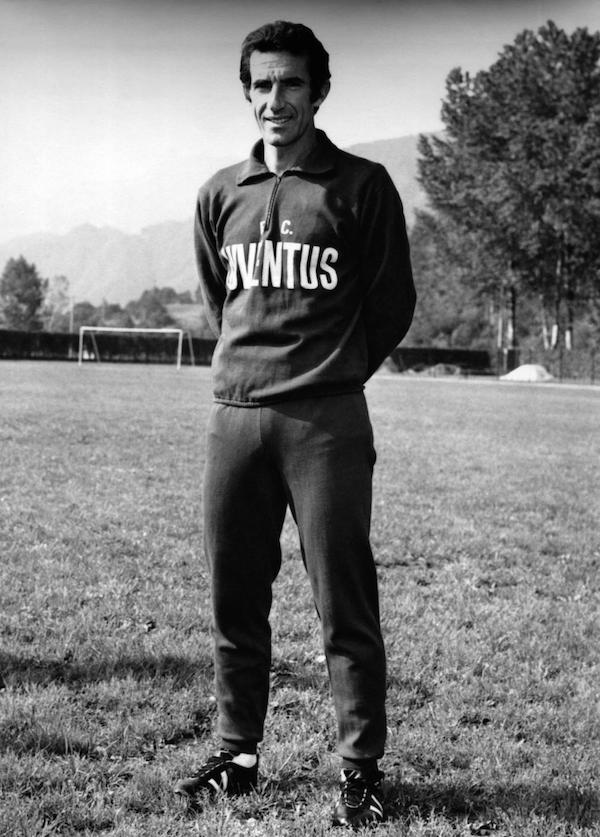
Picchi as Juventus coach in the 1970–71 season

After his playing career was over, Picchi pursued a coaching career in 1969; he went on to coach Varese, Livorno and then Juventus, until 16 February 1971, when he was hospitalised because of cancer, which ended his coaching career prematurely. He died three months later, at the age of 35, due to a tumour in his sixth left rib.

== Legacy ==
After his death in 1971, a memorial tournament, Memorial Armando Picchi, was played in his honour. On 21 October of the same year, the football club Armando Picchi Calcio was founded in his memory. As of 1990, the football stadium of Livorno, his hometown club, is named after him.

== Honours ==
Inter Milan

- Serie A: 1962–63, 1964–65, 1965–66
- European Cup: 1963–64, 1964–65
- Intercontinental Cup: 1964, 1965

Individual

- Italian Football Hall of Fame: 2021
