= 1965 Ballon d'Or =

Annual association football award event in France

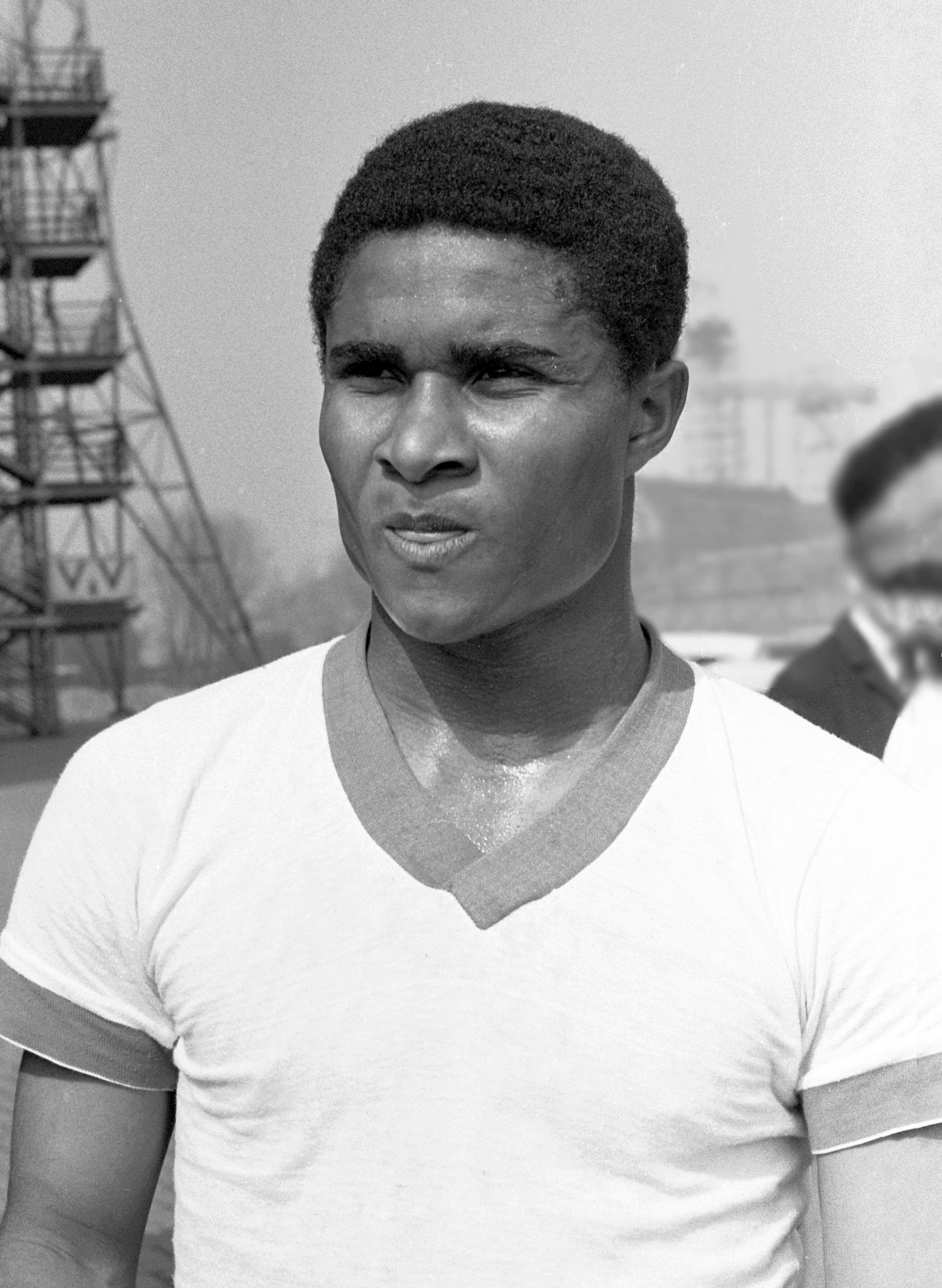
- 1965 Ballon d'Or winner, Eusébio
- Date: 28 December 1965
- Location: Paris, France
- Presented by: France Football

Highlights
- Won by: (Portugal) Eusébio (1st award)
- Website: ballondor.com

The 1965 Ballon d'Or, given to the best football player in Europe as judged by a panel of sports journalists from UEFA member countries, was awarded to Eusébio on 28 December 1965.

Eusébio was the first Portuguese national to win the award and still is the only Benfica player to have won it.

== Rankings ==
Rank	Name	Club(s)	Nationality	Points
1	Eusébio	(Portugal) Benfica	Portugal	67
2	Giacinto Facchetti	(Italy) Internazionale	Italy	59
3	Luis Suárez	(Italy) Internazionale	Spain	45
4	Paul Van Himst	(Belgium) Anderlecht	Belgium	25
5	Bobby Charlton	(England) Manchester United	England	19
6	Flórián Albert	(Hungary) Ferencváros	Hungary	14
7	Gianni Rivera	(Italy) Milan	Italy	10
8	Georgi Asparuhov	(Bulgaria) Levski Sofia	Bulgaria	9
8	Sandro Mazzola	(Italy) Internazionale	Italy	9
8	Valery Voronin	(Soviet Union) Torpedo Moskva	Soviet Union	9
11	Denis Law	(England) Manchester United	Scotland	8
12	Karl-Heinz Schnellinger	(Italy) Roma (Italy) Milan	West Germany	6
13	Jim Baxter	(Scotland) Rangers (England) Sunderland	Scotland	5
13	Ferenc Puskás	(Spain) Real Madrid	Spain	5
15	Mario Corso	(Italy) Internazionale	Italy	3
15	Lev Yashin	(Soviet Union) Dynamo Moscow	Soviet Union	3
17	Amancio	(Spain) Real Madrid	Spain	2
17	Franz Beckenbauer	(West Germany) Bayern Munich	West Germany	2
17	Ferenc Bene	(Hungary) Újpest	Hungary	2
17	Mário Coluna	(Portugal) Benfica	Portugal	2
17	Milan Galić	(Socialist Federal Republic of Yugoslavia) Partizan	Yugoslavia	2
17	Philippe Gondet	(France) Nantes	France	2
17	Andrej Kvašňák	(Czechoslovakia) Sparta Prague	Czechoslovakia	2
17	Slava Metreveli	(Soviet Union) Dinamo Tbilisi	Soviet Union	2
25	Ivor Allchurch	(Wales) Cardiff City (Wales) Swansea Town	Wales	1
25	Sigfried Held	(West Germany) Kickers Offenbach (West Germany) Borussia Dortmund	West Germany	1
25	Köbi Kuhn	(Switzerland) Zürich	Switzerland	1
