= Gianfranco Bedin =

Italian footballer

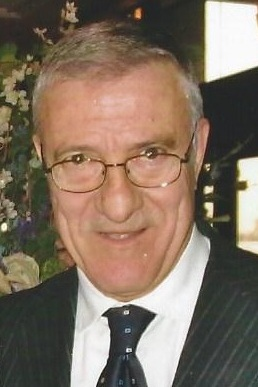
- Bedin in 2008

Personal information
- Date of birth: 24 July 1945 (age 81)
- Place of birth: Majano, Italy
- Height: 1.75 m (5 ft 9 in)
- Position: Midfielder

Senior career*
| Years | Team | Apps | (Gls) |
| 1964–1974 | Inter Milan | 310 | (23) |
| 1974–1978 | Sampdoria | 112 | (6) |
| 1978–1979 | Varese | 21 | (0) |
| 1979–1980 | Livorno | 27 | (2) |
| 1980–1981 | Rondinella | 19 | (2) |

International career
| 1966–1972 | Italy | 6 | (0) |

Managerial career
- Inter Milan (youth)
- * Club domestic league appearances and goals

Gianfranco Bedin (Italian pronunciation: [dʒaɱˈfraŋko beˈdin]; born 24 July 1945) is an Italian former professional footballer who played as a box-to-box or defensive midfielder. Bedin began his career with Inter Milan, playing for the team for a decade, and was part of their European Cup victory in 1965; he later also played for Sampdoria, Varese, Livorno and Rondinella. At international level, he also earned 6 caps for the Italy national team between 1966 and 1972.

== Club career ==
Born in San Donà di Piave, Bedin is mostly remembered for the club football he played whilst at Inter Milan from 1964 to 1974, as a member of Helenio Herrera's highly successful "Grande Inter" squad. He appeared in 211 Serie A matches with the Milanese club, winning three Serie A titles, the European Cup, and two Intercontinental Cups, also reaching the Coppa Italia final, as well as another European Cup final. He would later also play for Sampdoria (1974–78), Varese (1978–79), Livorno (1979–80), and Rondinella (1980–81), before retiring in 1981.

== International career ==
Bedin also represented Italy national team at international level, making 6 appearances for the national side between 1966 and 1972, although, despite his success at club level with Inter, he never represented Italy at a major international tournament.

== Style of play ==
Primarily a ball-winner, Bedin was known in particular for his anticipation, stamina, work-rate, man-marking, and his ability to read the game as a defensive or box-to-box midfielder, which allowed him to support his more creative and offensive teammates defensively. A modern, two-way player, he was also capable of starting attacking plays and getting into good offensive positions after winning back possession.

== Honours ==
Inter Milan

- Serie A: 1964–65, 1965–66, 1970–71
- European Cup: 1964–65
- Intercontinental Cup: 1964, 1965
