= Fausto Landini =

Italian footballer and coach

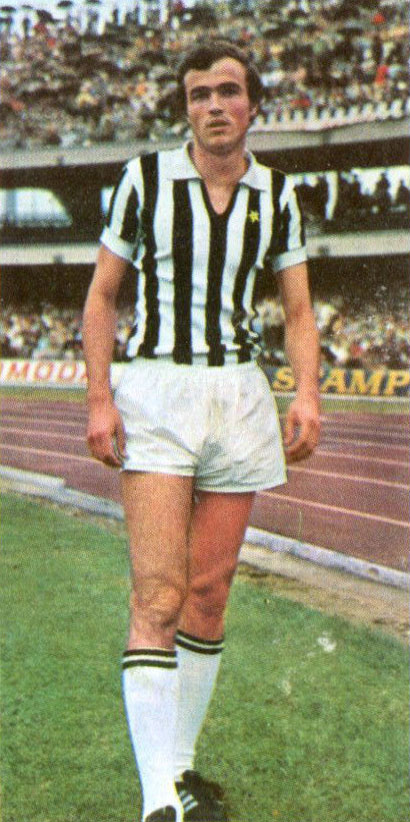
- Landini with Juventus in 1970

Personal information
- Date of birth: 28 June 1951 (age 75)
- Place of birth: San Giovanni Valdarno, Italy
- Height: 1.79 m (5 ft 10 1/2 in)
- Position: Striker

Team information
- Current team: Sangiovannese (youth manager)

Senior career*
Years	Team	Apps	(Gls)
1968–1970	Roma	44	(6)
1970–1971	Juventus	5	(0)
1971–1975	Bologna	76	(16)
1975–1976	Ascoli	0	(0)
1979–1980	Benevento	23	(5)
1980–1981	Sangiovannese	12	(0)

International career
1969–1972	Italy U-21	3	(1)

Managerial career
- 1994–1995: Colligiana
- 2004–2005: Siena (youth)
- 2006–: Sangiovannese (youth)
- * Club domestic league appearances and goals

Fausto Landini (born 28 June 1951 in San Giovanni Valdarno) is an Italian professional football coach and a former player, who played as a striker. He currently manages the youth team of A.C. Sangiovannese 1927.

Landini played for Juventus during 1970.

His older brother Spartaco Landini played for the Italy national football team.
