= Tarcisio Burgnich =

Italian footballer (1939–2021)

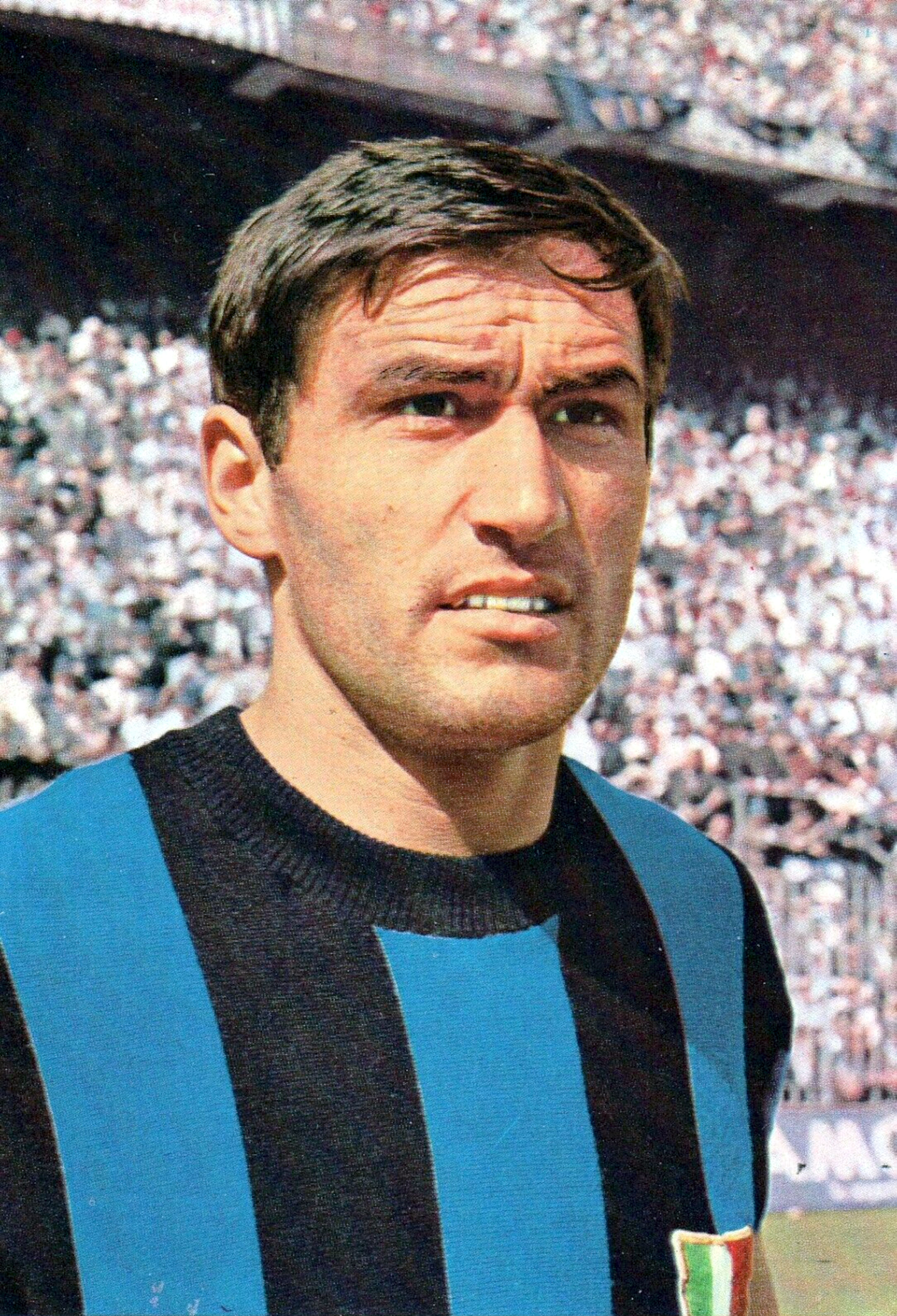
- Burgnich with Inter Milan in 1966

Personal information
- Date of birth: 25 April 1939
- Place of birth: Ruda, Kingdom of Italy
- Date of death: 26 May 2021 (aged 82)
- Place of death: Forte dei Marmi, Italy
- Height: 1.75 m (5 ft 9 in)
- Position: Defender

Youth career
- Udinese

Senior career*
Years	Team	Apps	(Gls)
1958–1960	Udinese	8	(0)
1960–1961	Juventus	13	(0)
1961–1962	Palermo	31	(1)
1962–1974	Inter Milan	358	(5)
1974–1977	Napoli	84	(0)
Total		494	(6)

International career
1963–1974	Italy	66	(2)

Managerial career
- 1978–1980: Livorno
- 1980–1981: Catanzaro
- 1981–1982: Bologna
- 1982–1984: Como
- 1984–1986: Genoa
- 1986–1987: Vicenza
- 1987–1988: Como
- 1988–1989: Catanzaro
- 1989–1991: Cremonese
- 1991–1992: Salernitana
- 1995–1997: Foggia
- 1997–1998: Genoa
- 1998–1999: Lucchese
- 1999–2000: Ternana
- 2000–2001: Pescara
Medal record
Men's football
Representing Italy (as player)
UEFA European Championship
Winner	1968 Italy
FIFA World Cup
Runner-up	1970 Mexico
- * Club domestic league appearances and goals

Tarcisio Burgnich (Italian pronunciation: [tarˈtʃiːzjo ˈburɲitʃ]; 25 April 1939 – 26 May 2021) was an Italian football manager and player, who played as a defender.

Throughout his career, Burgnich played for Udinese, Juventus, Palermo, Inter Milan, and Napoli; although he won titles with both Juventus and Napoli, he is best known for his time with Inter Milan, where he was a member of manager Helenio Herrera's Grande Inter side. He partnered with fellow full-back Giacinto Facchetti in the squad's back-line and played a key role in the team's successes in Herrera's defensive catenaccio system, due to his pace, stamina, offensive capabilities, and defensive work-rate, winning four Serie A titles, two European Cups, and two Intercontinental Cups.

At international level, Burgnich represented the Italy national team at the 1960 Summer Olympics, where they finished in fourth place, and at three FIFA World Cups, winning a runners-up medal at the 1970 FIFA World Cup. He was also a member of the national team that won Italy's first ever UEFA European Football Championship on home soil, in 1968.

A versatile player, he was capable of playing in any defensive position, being adept as a right-back, as a centre-back, and also as a sweeper. Due to his imposing physique, as well as his tenacious style of play, Inter teammate Armando Picchi (who was the captain and sweeper of the side) gave him the nickname "La Roccia" (The Rock).

== Club career ==
Burgnich began his career with local side Udinese, making his Serie A debut with the club on 2 June 1959, in a 7–0 away defeat to AC Milan. After short spells at the Friulian side, and subsequently Juventus (where he won the 1960–61 Serie A title), and Palermo, it was with Inter Milan that he found his spiritual home in the 1960s, after being acquired in 1962.

A versatile defender, Burgnich contributed both defensively and offensively and formed a full-back partnership with Giacinto Facchetti, both with Inter Milan and with the Italy national side. He made 467 appearances for the Nerazzurri, scoring 6 goals. His physical and tenacious playing style suited catenaccio system operated by Helenio Herrera which emphasized defensive organization and quick counter-attacks. With Inter, Burgnich enjoyed a highly successful period of domestic, European, and international dominance, winning five Italian championships, two European Cups and two Intercontinental Cups. He was part of the Inter team of the 1960s known as the Grande Inter.

Following his 12 seasons with Inter, he was controversially transferred to Napoli in 1974, as Inter's new president, Fraizzoli, was trying to rejuvenate the squad. Burgnich spent the final three seasons of his career with Napoli, operating as a sweeper in Luís Vinício's side, and finally won the Coppa Italia, as well as the Anglo-Italian League Cup, in 1976, before retiring in 1977. In total, he made 494 appearances in Serie A throughout his career.

== International career ==
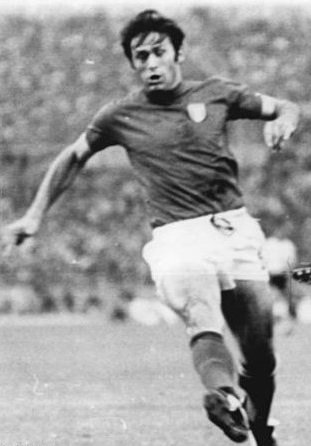
Burgnich at the 1974 FIFA World Cup

Burgnich was also a pillar of the Italy national team for more than a decade. He represented Italy at the 1960 Summer Olympics in Rome, where they finished in fourth place. He made his senior debut on 10 November 1963, in a 1–1 home draw against the Soviet Union in a qualifying match for the 1966 FIFA World Cup, and subsequently became a permanent fixture in the team's line-up, wearing the number 2 shirt. He scored his first international goal in a 1–0 friendly win over Austria in Milan on 18 June 1966. He later helped the national side win their first ever European Football Championship title in 1968, on home soil. He was also on Italy's roster for the 1966 World Cup, as well at the 1970 World Cup, where they reached the final, only to lose 4–1 to Brazil. In the memorable semi-final match against West Germany, often colloquially known as the "Game of the Century", Burgnich even managed to score a goal, helping his team to overcome the Germans 4–3 following extra time. He also took part in the 1974 FIFA World Cup with Italy. In total, he represented the Azzurri 66 times between 1963 and 1974, scoring twice.

He may best be remembered for his quote about Brazilian star Pelé's headed goal against him, following Italy's 4–1 defeat to Brazil in the 1970 World Cup Final (Burgnich had been assigned to man-mark the Brazilian during the final, but was beaten by him in the air):

"I told myself before the game, 'he's made of skin and bones just like everyone else' — but I was wrong."

He later said of the same goal:

"The cross came in and we both leapt as high as we could. Then I came down to Earth where I belong. And he stayed up there, where he belongs, and scored."

== After retirement ==
After his retirement, Burgnich worked as a manager on and off for nearly twenty years, with little success. During this time he managed Catanzaro, Bologna, Como, Livorno, Foggia, Lucchese, Cremonese, Genoa, Ternana and Vicenza.

Burgnich died on 26 May 2021 at the age of 82. He died at the San Camillo hospital in Forte dei Marmi, where he had been taken following a stroke.

== Style of play ==
A strong, large, quick, and energetic player, Burgnich is regarded as one of the greatest Italian defenders of all-time; his ability in the air, imposing physique, consistency, and his aggressive yet fair, and efficient playing style earned him the nickname "La Roccia" (The Rock), despite not being particularly tall. A former offensive, central midfielder, he was a tactically versatile, intelligent, and hard-working footballer who was adept at aiding his team both offensively and defensively; he was capable of playing in several defensive positions, and throughout his career, he was deployed as a man-marking centre-back (or "stopper"), as a sweeper (in particular in his later career), and in particular as a right-sided full-back or wing-back, where he particularly excelled in Herrera's catenaccio system, due to his pace, stamina, physicality, and tenacity. He formed an important partnership with the more offensive minded left-back Facchetti during his career, which is regarded as one of the greatest full-back pairings in football history; although he was less adept at starting attacking plays from the back-line than Facchetti, and initially less likely to push forward during his time at Inter, the more defensive minded Burgnich was an "old-fashioned defender", being an excellent man-marker and a hard tackler, who was difficult to beat in one on one situations. He was also known for his anticipation and reactions, as well as his concentration, leadership, and discipline both on and off the pitch, despite his reserved character. However, he was also known for his experience and organisational abilities as a defender, as well as his ability to play the offside trap, and even excelled as an offensive sweeper or central defender at Napoli during his later career in manager Luís Vinício's zonal marking system, where he was also tasked with advancing into midfield to start offensive plays, and to push forward and contribute to his team's attacks, in addition to his defensive duties.

== Career statistics ==
=== Club ===
Appearances and goals by club, season and competition
Team	Season	Serie A		Coppa Italia		European Competition (Note: Includes the UEFA European Cup, Inter-Cities Fairs Cup, UEFA Cup, and UEFA Cup Winners' Cup.)		Other Tournaments (Note: Includes the Intercontinental Cup.)		Total	
Team	Season	Apps	Goals	Apps	Goals	Apps	Goals	Apps	Goals	Apps	Goals
Udinese	1958–59	1	0			–		–			
Udinese	1959–60	7	0			–		–			
Udinese	Total	8	0								
Juventus	1960–61	13	0								
Palermo	1961–62	31	1								
Inter Milan	1962–63	31	0								
Inter Milan	1963–64	33	0								
Inter Milan	1964–65	32	1								
Inter Milan	1965–66	30	0								
Inter Milan	1966–67	30	2								
Inter Milan	1967–68	30	0								
Inter Milan	1968–69	30	1								
Inter Milan	1969–70	26	1								
Inter Milan	1970–71	29	0								
Inter Milan	1971–72	27	0								
Inter Milan	1972–73	30	0								
Inter Milan	1973–74	30	0								
Inter Milan	Total	358	5								
Napoli	1974–75	30	0								
Napoli	1975–76	30	0								
Napoli	1976–77	24	0								
Napoli	Total	84	0								
Career total		494	6								

=== International ===
Scores and results list Italy's goal tally first, score column indicates score after each Burgnich goal.

List of international goals scored by Tarcisio Burgnich
No.	Date	Venue	Opponent	Score	Result	Competition
1	18 June 1966	Stadio Giuseppe Meazza, Milan	Austria	1–0	1–0	Friendly
2	17 June 1970	Estadio Azteca, Mexico City	West Germany	2–2	4–3 (a.e.t.)	1970 World Cup Semi-final

== Honours ==
Inter

- Serie A: 1962–63, 1964–65, 1965–66, 1970–71
- European Cup: 1963–64, 1964–65
- Intercontinental Cup: 1964, 1965

Napoli

- Anglo-Italian Cup: 1976
- Coppa Italia: 1975–76

Juventus

- Serie A: 1960–61

Italy

- UEFA European Championship: 1968
- FIFA World Cup Runner-up: 1970

Individual

- World Soccer World XI: 1964
- FUWO European Team of the Season: 1970
