= Renato Cappellini =

Italian footballer

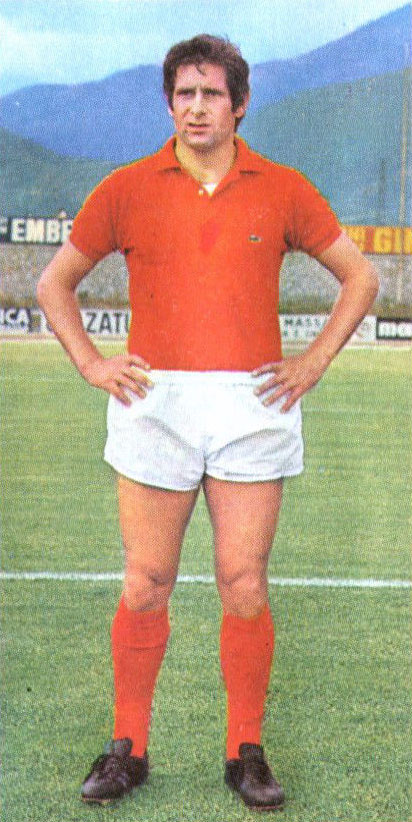
- Cappellini with Roma in 1970

Personal information
- Date of birth: 9 October 1943 (age 83)
- Place of birth: Soncino, Italy
- Height: 1.80 m (5 ft 11 in)
- Position: Striker

Senior career*
Years	Team	Apps	(Gls)
1963–1968	Internazionale	50	(18)
1964–1965	→ Genoa (loan)	26	(6)
1968–1969	Varese	25	(2)
1969–1974	Roma	97	(23)
1974–1976	Como	19	(4)
1976–1977	Chiasso	17	(3)

International career
1967	Italy	2	(1)
- * Club domestic league appearances and goals

Renato Cappellini (Italian pronunciation: [reˈnaːto kappelˈliːni]; born 9 October 1943) is a retired Italian professional footballer who played as a striker.

== Honours ==
Internazionale

- Serie A champion: 1965–66.

Roma

- Anglo-Italian Cup: 1971-1972
