= Carlo Soldo =

Italian footballer and manager (born 1942)

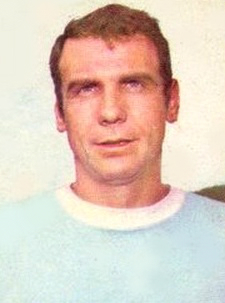

Personal information
- Date of birth: 13 April 1942 (age 84)
- Place of birth: Genivolta, Italy
- Position: Defender

Youth career
- Folgore Milano

Senior career*
Years	Team	Apps	(Gls)
1960–1963	Novara	58	(0)
1963–1966	Varese	97	(2)
1966–1967	Inter	0	(0)
1967–1969	Lazio	73	(5)
1969–1971	Monza	24	(0)
1971–1972	Pro Vercelli	18	(0)
1972–1973	Messina	21	(1)
1973–1974	Triestina	6	(0)

Managerial career
- 1974–1975: Portogruaro
- 1975–1976: Novese
- 1978–1979: Pro Vercelli
- 1979: Treviso
- 1980–1981: Casale
- 1981–1982: Derthona
- 1982–1983: Pro Patria
- 1983–1985: Pergolettese
- 1985–1986: Voghera
- 1986–1987: Pergolettese
- 1987–1988: Varese
- 1988–1989: Fidelis Andria
- 1991–1992: Baracca Lugo
- 1992–1993: Varese
- 1993–1994: Palazzolo
- 1995: Pro Sesto
- 1995–1996: Baracca Lugo
- 1996–1997: Pavia
- 1997–1998: Südtirol
- 1998–1999: Baracca Lugo
- 2000: Imperia
- 2000–2001: Lecco
- 2001–2002: Alzano Seriate
- 2002–2003: Alessandria
- 2005–2020: Inter Milan (scout)
- * Club domestic league appearances and goals

Carlo Soldo (born 13 April 1942) is an Italian football defender and later manager.

== Club career ==
Soldo was raised in Milan, where he played in the youth teams of Folgore before moving to Novara, where he played for the first time in Serie B in 1960-61. He then moved to Varese, contributing to their promotion in Serie A in 1963-64. With Varese he played another two seasons in Serie A.

In 1966 he moved to Inter, with which he played the 1966-67 European Cup scoring a goal in the second round against Vasas Budapest. Not being considered much by Inter's manager Helenio Herrera he was never used in the league, and in November 1967 he moved to Lazio in Serie B. There he contributed again to their promotion in 1968-69. An injury to his knee made his further career unnoticeable in minor series until 1974.

Soldo scored a total of 67 appearances and 2 goals in Serie A and 86 appearances and 2 goals in Serie B.

== Manager career ==
He then moved to a manager career. Among his most notable appearances, he gained a promotion in Serie C1 in 1988-89 with Fidelis Andria.
