= Giacinto Facchetti =

Italian footballer (1942–2006)

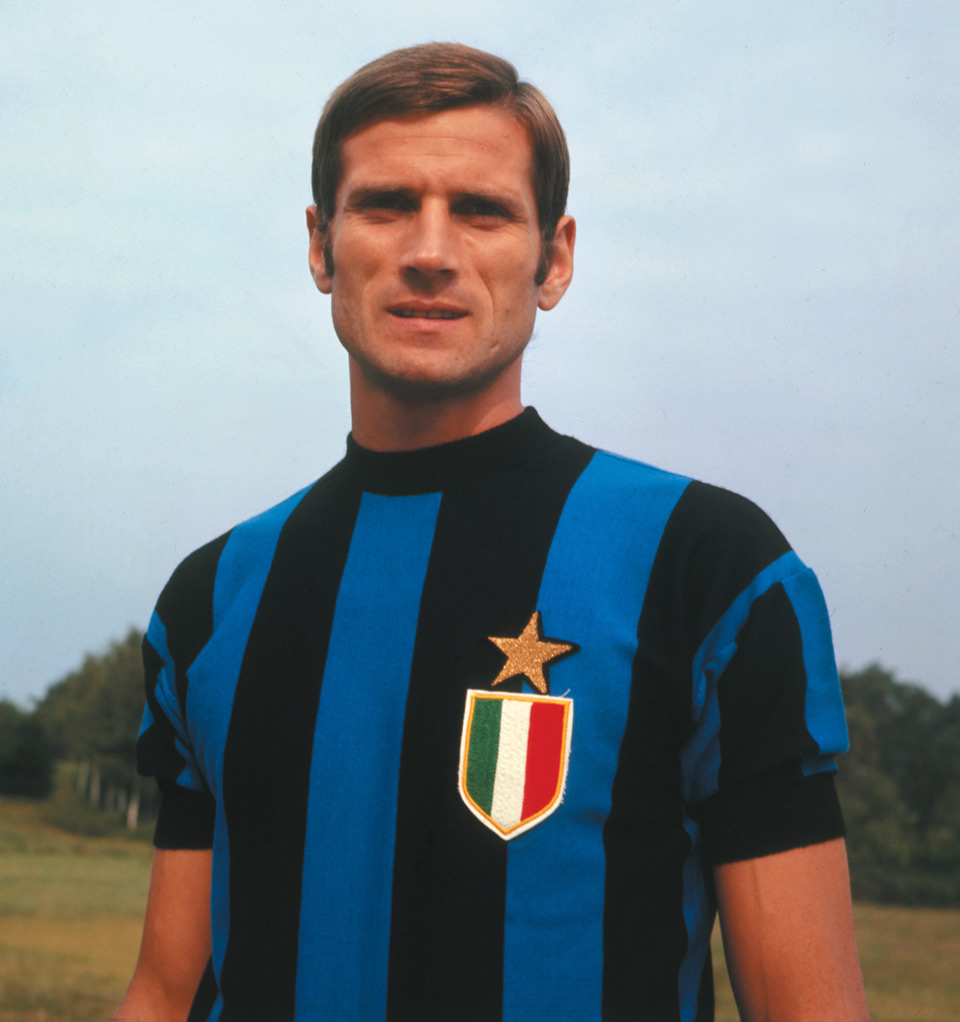
- Facchetti with Inter Milan in the 1966–67 season

Personal information
- Full name: Giacinto Facchetti
- Date of birth: 18 July 1942
- Place of birth: Treviglio, Lombardy, Kingdom of Italy
- Date of death: 4 September 2006 (aged 64)
- Place of death: Milan, Lombardy, Italy
- Height: 1.91 m (6 ft 3 in)
- Position: Left-back

Youth career
- 1956: GSD Mario Zanconti
- 1957–1960: Trevigliese

Senior career*
Years	Team	Apps	(Gls)
1960–1978	Inter Milan	476	(59)

International career
1964	Italy U21	1	(0)
1963–1977	Italy	94	(3)
Medal record
Representing Italy
Men's football
UEFA European Championship
Winner	1968 Italy
FIFA World Cup
Runner-up	1970 Mexico
- * Club domestic league appearances and goals

Giacinto Facchetti (Italian pronunciation: [dʒaˈtʃinto fakˈketti]; 18 July 1942 – 4 September 2006) was an Italian footballer who played as a left-back for Inter Milan from 1960 to 1978. He later served as Inter chairman from January 2004 until his death in 2006. He played 634 official games for the club, scoring 75 goals, and was a member of "Grande Inter" team under manager Helenio Herrera which won four Serie A titles, a Coppa Italia, two European Cups, and two Intercontinental Cups. He placed second for the Ballon d'Or in 1965.

Facchetti represented Italy internationally on 94 occasions, including three FIFA World Cups. He was also elected to the 1970 FIFA World Cup All-Star Team, in which Italy were runners-up. He was also captain of the national side for a record 11 years that won Italy's first ever UEFA European Championship on home soil in 1968, where he was also elected to the team of the tournament.

Facchetti is remembered as one of the first prominent attacking full-backs and is considered among the best players at his position. Known for his pace, technique, intelligence, physique, and stamina, he formed a strong defensive partnership with Tarcisio Burgnich in Inter's catenaccio system and with the Italy national team. He was also recognized for his discipline and leadership, serving as captain for both Inter Milan and Italy for several years.

In March 2004, Pelé named him one of the Top 125 greatest living footballers as part of FIFA's 100th anniversary celebrations. In 2006, the Campionato Nazionale Primavera was named after him. In 2015, he was posthumously inducted into the Italian Football Hall of Fame.

== Club career ==
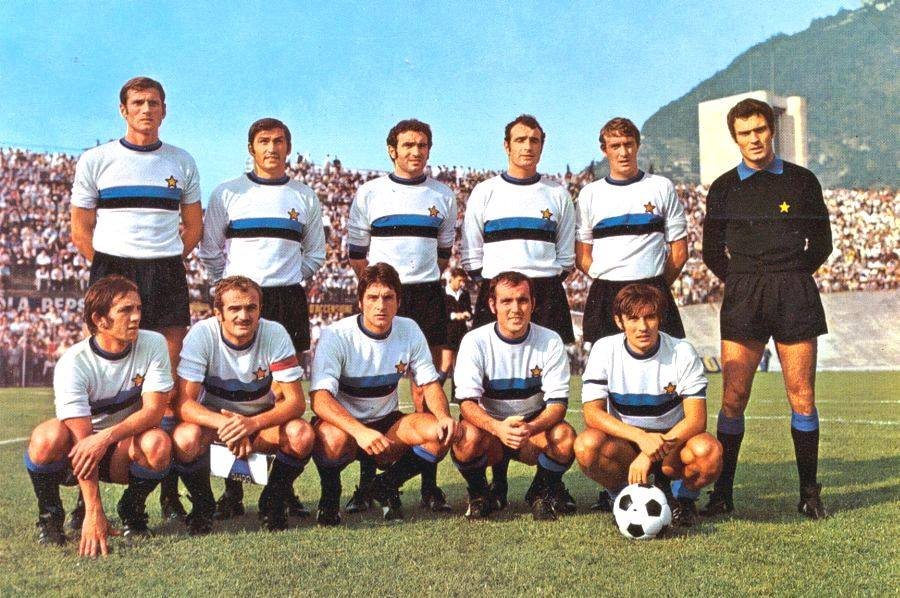
Facchetti (standing, first from left) with the 1970–71 Inter Milan

Born in Treviglio, in the province of Bergamo of the Italian region of Lombardy, Facchetti began his career with his hometown club, GSD Mario Zanconti, as a forward, due to his pace, powerful shot, and technique. While playing for Trevigliese, he was noticed by Helenio Herrera, then manager of Inter, who launched him in Serie A in the late 1960–61 season as an attacking full-back on the left, due to his physique, energy, and tackling ability, in addition to his offensive attributes; he made his club and top-flight debut on 21 May 1961, in a 2–0 away win over Roma.

The change of role proved to be an effective choice, and eventually, Facchetti developed into one of the most effective defenders in Italian football, forming a notable partnership in defence with fellow Italian full-back Tarcisio Burgnich. Facchetti's innovative playing style as one of the first European overlapping full-backs, combining hard defending with offensive prowess, played a key role in the defensive yet counter-attacking catenaccio system of Herrera's "Grande Inter" side that dominated Italian, European, and World football in the 1960s; whilst conceding few goals defensively, Facchetti was also able to contribute offensively with numerous goals and assists. He held the record for most goals in a single Serie A season by a defender, with 10 goals scored during the 1965–66 season, until it was broken by Daniel Passarella in 1985–86, and later Marco Materazzi during the 2000–01 season.

Facchetti spent his entire professional career with Inter, later captaining the side (after Armando Picchi, Mario Corso, and Sandro Mazzola) during his final season with the club, between 1977–78. With his club, Facchetti won four scudetti in 1963, 1965, 1966, and 1971, one Italian Cup in 1978, two European Cups in 1964 and 1965, and two Intercontinental Cups in 1964 and 1965. Due to his performances for Inter, Facchetti also narrowly missed the opportunity to become the first defender to win the Ballon d'Or, placing second in 1965, after narrowly missing out on a treble winning season with Inter that year; Inter won the Serie A and the European Cup, but were defeated in the 1965 Coppa Italia final by Juventus. Facchetti's 59 goals in Serie A made him the most prolific defender in the history of the Italian league.

== International career ==
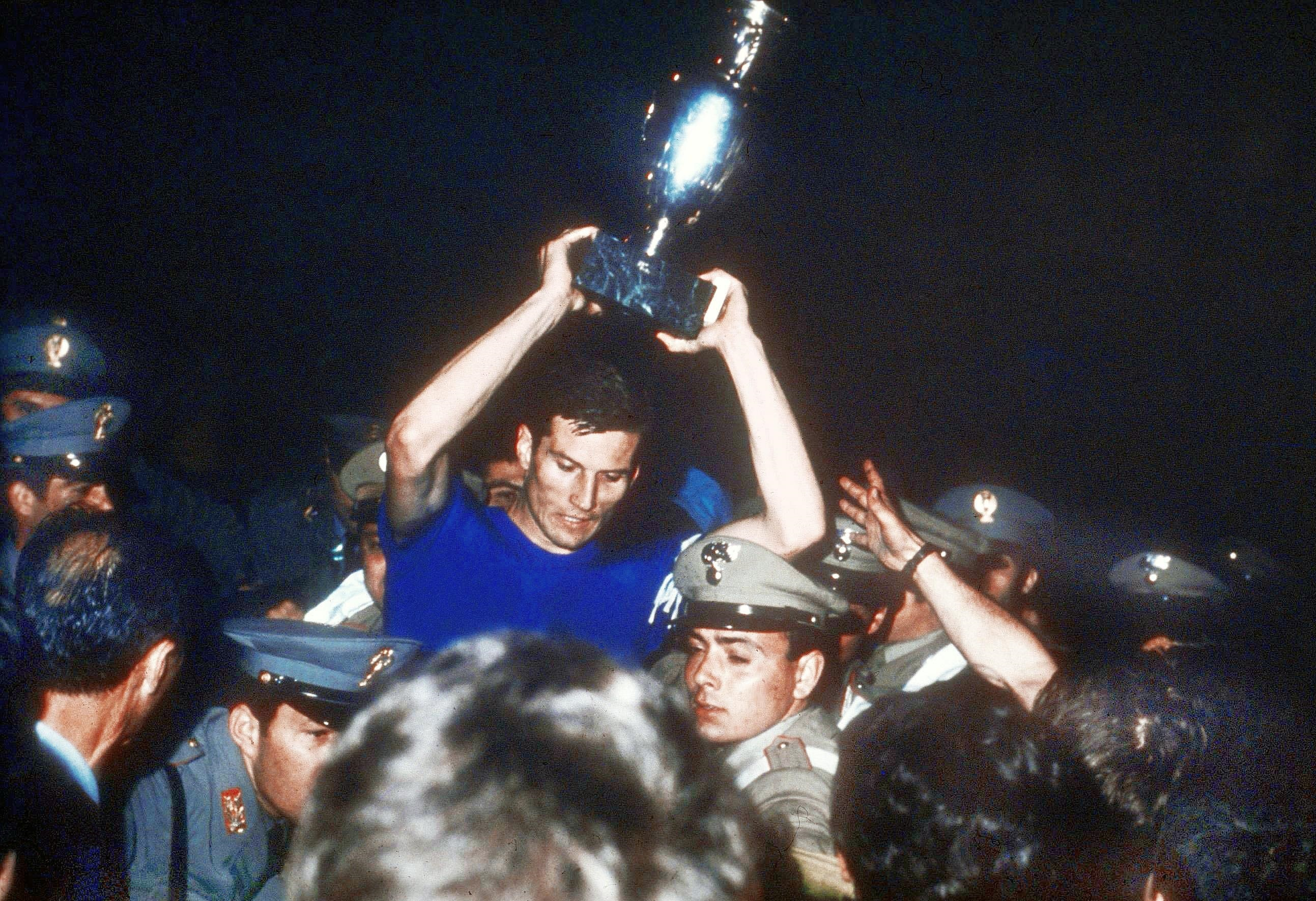
Italian captain Facchetti lifts the Euro 1968 trophy

Facchetti made his debut for Italy on 23 March 1963, in a 1–0 away win in a European qualifier against Turkey. He was capped 94 times (a record at the time, since overtaken only by Dino Zoff, Paolo Maldini, Fabio Cannavaro, and Gianluigi Buffon) wearing the captain's armband 70 times for a record period of 11 years and scoring three goals between 1963 and 1977; he is currently his nation's tenth-highest appearance holder. He played for his country at the 1966, 1970, and 1974 FIFA World Cups, captaining Italy in the latter two editions of the tournament. Facchetti also captained the Italian squad to victory at Euro 1968, wearing the number 10 shirt, after advancing to the finals by calling the coin toss correctly following extra time against the Soviet Union, before winning the final over Yugoslavia 2–0 in the replay match, as well as being named to the Team of the Tournament. He was also named to the Team of the Tournament in the 1970 World Cup, where he helped his team to the final of the tournament, only to be defeated 4–1 by Brazil.

== Style of play ==
Regarded as one of the greatest full-backs of all time, Facchetti's pace, stamina, power, and excellent physical and technical traits allowed him to excel as an offensive full-back or wing-back. As a former forward and midfielder, he was known for his ability to make attacking runs down the left flank and get into good offensive positions in the area which allowed him to either score or assist goals due to his powerful shot and crossing ability, and was known for his tendency to cut into the centre in order to strike on goal, which was very unusual for full-backs at the time. He was among the best offensive full-backs, alongside Antonio Cabrini and Virgilio Maroso.

Tall and hard-working Facchetti was adept in the air, he was highly regarded for his ability with either foot, as well as his distribution, and ball skills; he also excelled defensively, playing as a sweeper as he lost some of his pace later in his career, due to his technical skills, distribution, intelligence and ability to read the game or start plays from the back after winning back the ball, as well as his man-marking ability, positioning, anticipation, and tackling. A precocious talent in his youth, he also stood out for his longevity in his later career. In addition to his footballing ability, he was also known for his correct behaviour on the pitch, as well as his leadership; he was sent off only once throughout his entire career for sarcastically applauding the referee.

== After retirement and death ==
Over the years, Facchetti held various managerial positions at Inter Milan, including technical director, board member, worldwide ambassador, and vice-chairman. Facchetti was elected chairman of Inter on 19 January 2004, following the resignation of previous chairman Massimo Moratti. After a long illness, he died of pancreatic cancer in Milan on 4 September 2006. He is survived by his wife Giovanna and his four children Barbara, Vera, Gianfelice and Luca.

== Calciopoli ==
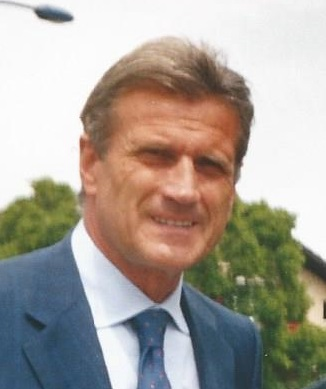
Facchetti in 2002

The role of Facchetti in the events that led to Calciopoli remaines the subject of debate. As chairman of Inter, which benefitted from the decisions of the sports justice, he was charged of Article 6 violation (related to match-fixing warranting relegation), by the FIGC prosecutor Stefano Palazzi in July 2011. Palazzi presented a report on the Calciopoli bis investigation, originating from facts that emerged in the related criminal proceeding in Naples and at the time judged not relevant in the sports proceedings five years earlier, in which, among others, Facchetti was accused of violating Article 6 of the then Sports Justice Code, which was an offence consisting of "a consolidated network of relationships, of a non-regulatory nature, directed to alter the principles of impartiality, impartiality, and independence of the refereeing sector", actions that Palazzi judged to be "certainly aimed at ensuring an advantage in the standings for Inter". The statute of limitations regarding any acts committed led Palazzi himself to declare the impossibility of proceeding and verifying the allegations.

Facchetti was defended by former Italy's players like Gianni Rivera and Gigi Riva, as well as Moratti, among others. Riva said that "Giacinto was an extraordinary person clean, honest, a constant exemple, he was our angel. Anyone who knew Facchetti knows he was a true man, who dedicated his life to sport. Anyone who talks about him now would do well to keep quiet, because Giacinto was honest and deserves respect." Moratti said that this was "nothing new: they are judging what had already been seen and what someone else had considered inconsistent and unimportant", that "I don't accept it and Inter don't accept it, and what makes it all in very bad taste is the fact that Facchetti is involved, a person who is no longer with us, whom I admire and respect for his honesty", and that considering Facchetti as in the accusations of Palazzi was "offensive, serious, and stupid".

In 2010, Luciano Moggi, banned for football for life, publicly accused Facchetti of "lobbying referees". In a 2011 interview, public prosecutor Giuseppe Narducci stated: "Facchetti committed no crime. Those phone calls have no criminal value. They have nothing to do with the power structure we uncovered, which governed all of Italian professional football. It was something unique, unprecedented in the past, an association that brought together not only individuals and clubs, primarily Luciano Moggi's, but also parts of federal structures. The association controlled the referee designators. Calciopoli-bis? A furious campaign to make everyone appear guilty. They want to make Facchetti's phone calls look similar to Moggi's, but that's not the case at all."

In 2015, Facchetti's son Gianfelice, representing the Facchetti family, sued Moggi for libel. Moggi was acquitted by the Milan court of the charge of defaming Facchetti in a television broadcast. Moggi accused Facchetti "of having also requested and obtained special treatment in the refereeing of Inter's matches". The judge dismissed the lawsuit and acquitted Moggi, finding "with certainty a good truthfulness" in his statements and citing the existence of "a sort of lobbying intervention on the part of the then chairman of Inter towards the referee class ... , significant of a relationship of a friendly [and] preferential type, [with] heights that are not properly commendable." The sentence was upheld on appeal in 2018, and passed judgment in 2019.

== Legacy ==
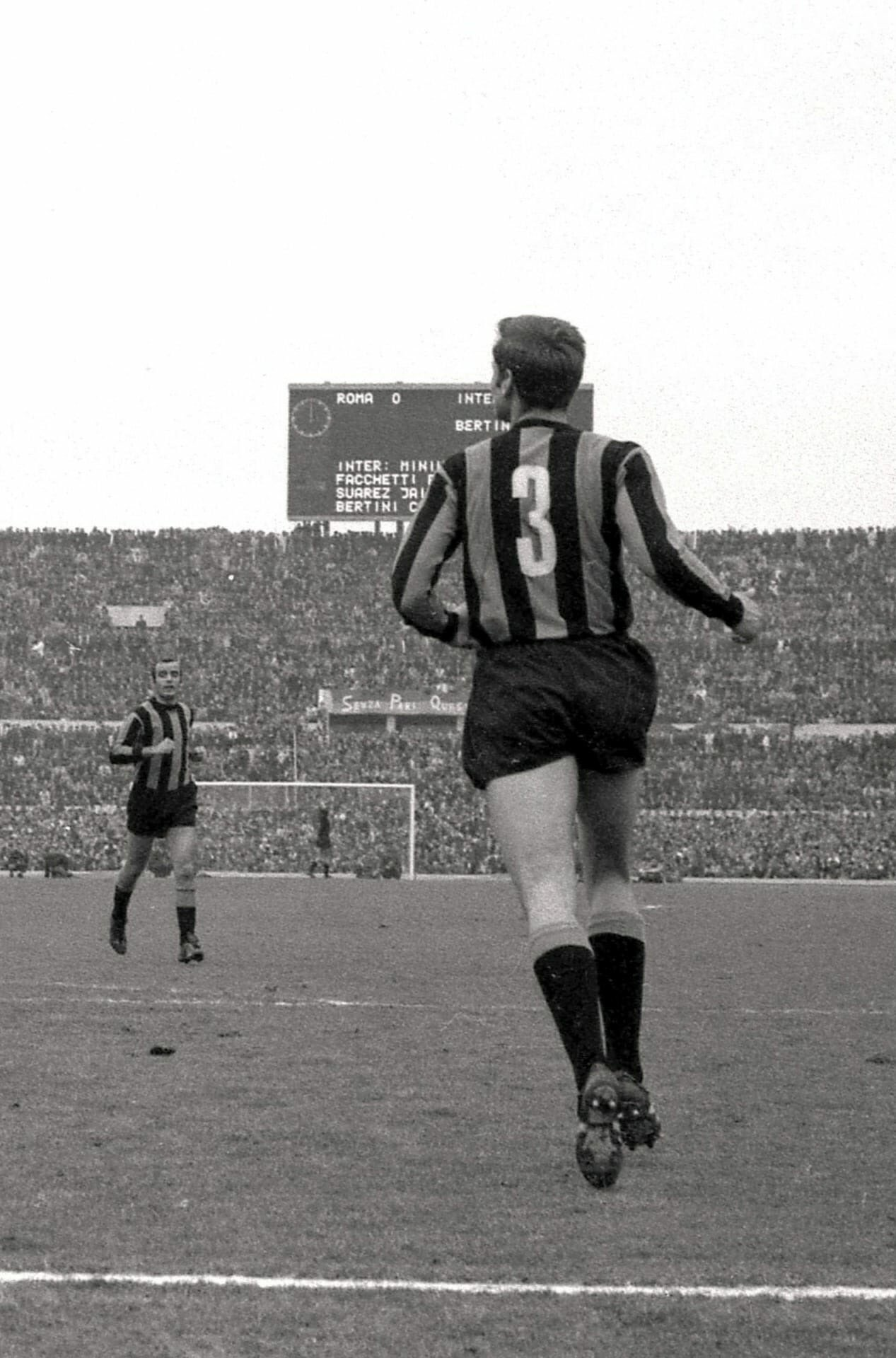
Facchetti in 1969 with his iconic number 3 shirt, posthumously retired by Inter Milan in 2006.

In March 2004, Pelé named Facchetti one of the Top 125 greatest living footballers as part of FIFA's 100th anniversary celebrations. Following Facchetti's death in 2006, he was named one of the year's Golden Foot "Football Legends", and was also the recipient of the FIFA Presidential Award. Known for his discipline as well as his playing ability throughout his career, the Premio internazionale Giacinto Facchetti was also established in his honour later that year, and is currently awarded annually to a football personality who was stood out for their honesty, correct behaviour, and sportsmanship. Also after his death, the Campionato Nazionale Primavera included Facchetti's name for the official renaming of the championship to Campionato Primavera Tim – Trofeo Giacinto Facchetti. Inter posthumously retired the number 3 shirt in his honour.

On 22 September 2008, a square in Cesano Maderno, a town of the Metropolitan City of Milan, was renamed in honour of Facchetti. Facchetti is featured in the football video game FIFA 14's Classic XI (a multi-national all-star team), along with compatriots Bruno Conti, Gianni Rivera, and Franco Baresi. In 2015, he was posthumously inducted into the Italian Football Hall of Fame. EI-INA, an Airbus A320neo in the fleet of Italian flag carrier ITA Airways, bears his name. The aircraft was most notably used to transport Pope Leo XIV in his apostolic journey to Turkey and Lebanon.

== Career statistics ==
=== Club ===
Appearances and goals by club, season, and competition
Club	Season	League			Coppa Italia		Europe		Total	
Club	Season	Division	Apps	Goals	Apps	Goals	Apps	Goals	Apps	Goals
Inter Milan	1960–61	Serie A	3	1	–		1	0	4	1
Inter Milan	1961–62	Serie A	15	0	–		6	0	21	0
Inter Milan	1962–63	Serie A	31	4	2	0	–		33	4
Inter Milan	1963–64	Serie A	33	4	–		9	0	42	4
Inter Milan	1964–65	Serie A	32	2	3	0	6	1	41	3
Inter Milan	1965–66	Serie A	32	10	1	0	5	2	38	12
Inter Milan	1966–67	Serie A	34	4	2	0	10	2	46	6
Inter Milan	1967–68	Serie A	28	7	9	2	–		37	9
Inter Milan	1968–69	Serie A	30	6	3	1	–		33	7
Inter Milan	1969–70	Serie A	28	5	6	1	8	0	42	6
Inter Milan	1970–71	Serie A	30	5	3	0	2	0	35	5
Inter Milan	1971–72	Serie A	27	4	8	1	9	1	44	6
Inter Milan	1972–73	Serie A	29	1	10	3	5	0	44	4
Inter Milan	1973–74	Serie A	28	2	7	0	2	0	37	2
Inter Milan	1974–75	Serie A	23	0	8	1	3	0	34	1
Inter Milan	1975–76	Serie A	28	3	10	0	–		38	3
Inter Milan	1976–77	Serie A	27	1	9	1	1	0	37	2
Inter Milan	1977–78	Serie A	18	0	4	0	1	0	23	0
Career total			476	59	85	10	68	6	629	75

=== International ===
Appearances and goals by national team and year
National team	Year	Apps	Goals
Italy	1963	5	0
Italy	1964	4	1
Italy	1965	7	1
Italy	1966	10	0
Italy	1967	6	1
Italy	1968	6	0
Italy	1969	6	0
Italy	1970	11	0
Italy	1971	6	0
Italy	1972	3	0
Italy	1973	7	0
Italy	1974	6	0
Italy	1975	6	0
Italy	1976	7	0
Italy	1977	4	0
Total		94	3

Scores and results list Italy's goal tally first, score column indicates score after each Facchetti goal.

List of international goals scored by Giacinto Facchetti
No.	Date	Venue	Opponent	Score	Result	Competition
1	4 November 1964	Stadio Luigi Ferraris, Genoa, Italy	Finland		6–1	1966 FIFA World Cup qualification
2	7 December 1965	Stadio San Paolo, Naples, Italy	Scotland		3–0	1966 FIFA World Cup qualification
3	22 March 1967	GSP Stadium, Nicosia, Cyprus	Cyprus		2–0	Euro 1968 qualification

== Honours ==
Inter Milan

- Serie A: 1962–63, 1964–65, 1965–66, 1970–71
- Coppa Italia: 1977–78
- European Cup: 1963–64, 1964–65
- Intercontinental Cup: 1964, 1965

Italy

- UEFA European Championship: 1968
- FIFA World Cup runner-up: 1970

Individual

- FIFA 100 (125 greatest living players, as selected by Pelé): 2004
- Golden Foot "Football Legends": 2006
- FIFA Presidential Award: 2006
- UEFA European Championship Team of the Tournament: 1968
- FIFA World Cup All-Star Team: 1970
- Ballon d'Or (runner-up): 1965
- World XI: 1964, 1965, 1966, 1967, 1968, 1969
- FUWO European Team of the Year: 1965, 1966, 1967, 1968, 1969, 1970
- Sport Ideal European XI: 1971, 1973
- Italian Football Hall of Fame: 2015
- Inter Milan Hall of Fame: 2019

Orders

- Commander of the Order of Merit of the Italian Republic: 1994

== See also ==
- List of one-club men in association football
