= Aquilino Bonfanti =

Italian footballer (1943-2016)

Personal information
- Date of birth: 25 February 1943
- Place of birth: Milan, Italy
- Date of death: 12 April 2016 (aged 73)
- Height: 1.80 m (5 ft 11 in)
- Position: Midfielder

Senior career*
Years	Team	Apps	(Gls)
1962–1964	Rizzoli Milano	51	(18)
1964–1965	Milan	3	(0)
1965–1967	Lecco	64	(12)
1967–1968	Internazionale	7	(1)
1968–1969	Verona	14	(0)
1969–1972	Catania	100	(27)
1972–1973	Catanzaro	28	(4)
1973–1974	Reggina	19	(6)
1974–1975	Pistoiese	19	(?)
1975–1976	Alghero	30	(?)
1976–1979	Carrarese	86	(?)
- * Club domestic league appearances and goals

Aquilino Bonfanti (25 February 1943 – 12 April 2016) was an Italian professional football player who played as a midfielder.
