= Mauro Bicicli =

Italian footballer and coach

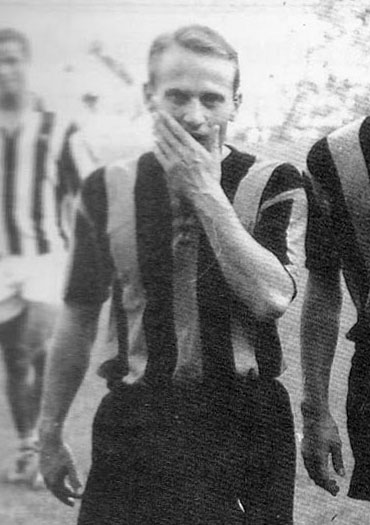
- Bicicli with Internazionale in 1959

Personal information
- Date of birth: 17 April 1935
- Place of birth: Crema, Italy
- Date of death: 22 August 2001 (aged 66)
- Place of death: Crema, Italy
- Height: 1.68 m (5 ft 6 in)
- Position: Midfielder

Senior career*
Years	Team	Apps	(Gls)
1952–1953	Crema	27	(2)
1953–1955	Internazionale	1	(0)
1955–1956	Parma	32	(8)
1956–1957	Catania	32	(8)
1957–1963	Internazionale	147	(17)
1963–1966	Genoa	77	(8)
1966–1967	Internazionale	11	(2)
1967–1968	L.R. Vicenza	21	(1)
1968–1969	Brescia	26	(0)

Managerial career
- 1976–1977: Brescia
- 1981–1982: Brescia
- 1983–1985: Ospitaletto
- 1985–1986: Fanfulla
- 1986–1993: Legnano
- * Club domestic league appearances and goals

Mauro Bicicli (17 April 1935 in Crema – 22 August 2001 in Crema) was an Italian professional football player and coach, who played as a midfielder.

== Death ==
Bicicli died in 2001 due to a liver tumour.

== Honours ==
=== Club ===
Inter

- Serie A champion: 1962–63.
