= Renato Dehò =

Italian footballer (1946–2019)

Personal information
- Date of birth: 12 September 1946
- Place of birth: Milan, Italy
- Date of death: 1 June 2019 (aged 72)
- Place of death: Lecco
- Height: 1.80 m (5 ft 11 in)
- Position: Midfielder

Senior career*
Years	Team	Apps	(Gls)
1965–1968	Internazionale	1	(0)
1967–1968	Lecco	21	(0)
1968–1973	Monza	147	(2)
1973	Varese	8	(0)
1973–1976	Anconitana	77	(?)
1976–1977	Baracca Lugo		
- * Club domestic league appearances and goals

Renato Dehò (12 September 1946 – 1 July 2019) was an Italian professional football player. He was born in Milan.
