= Spartaco Landini =

Italian footballer

Personal information
- Full name: Spartaco Landini
- Date of birth: 31 January 1944
- Place of birth: Terranuova Bracciolini, Italy
- Date of death: 16 April 2017 (aged 73)
- Place of death: Genova, Italy
- Height: 1.79 m (5 ft 10 1/2 in)
- Position: Defender

Youth career
- A.S.D. Sangiovannese 1927

Senior career*
Years	Team	Apps	(Gls)
1962–1970	F.C. Internazionale Milano	94	(1)
1970–1973	U.S. Città di Palermo	97	(0)
1973–1976	S.S.C. Napoli	26	(0)
1976–1978	A.S.D. Sangiovannese 1927	69	(0)
Total		286	(1)

International career
1966	Italy	4	(0)

Managerial career
- 1978–1979: Avellino (Assistant)
- * Club domestic league appearances and goals

Spartaco Landini (Italian pronunciation: [ˈspartako lanˈdiːni]; 31 January 1944 – 16 April 2017) was an Italian football defender and later a manager.

== Club career ==
During his club career, Landini played for F.C. Internazionale Milano, U.S. Città di Palermo and S.S.C. Napoli in Serie A.

== International career ==
Landini earned 4 caps for the Italy national football team in 1966, and participated in the 1966 FIFA World Cup.

== After retirement ==
After he retired from playing football, Landini became one of Genoa C.F.C.'s directors.

== Personal life ==
Spartaco's brother, Fausto Landini, also played football professionally, as a forward.

Spartaco Landini died in Genova on 16 April 2017 at the age of 73.
