= Vito D'Amato =

Italian footballer (1944–2025)

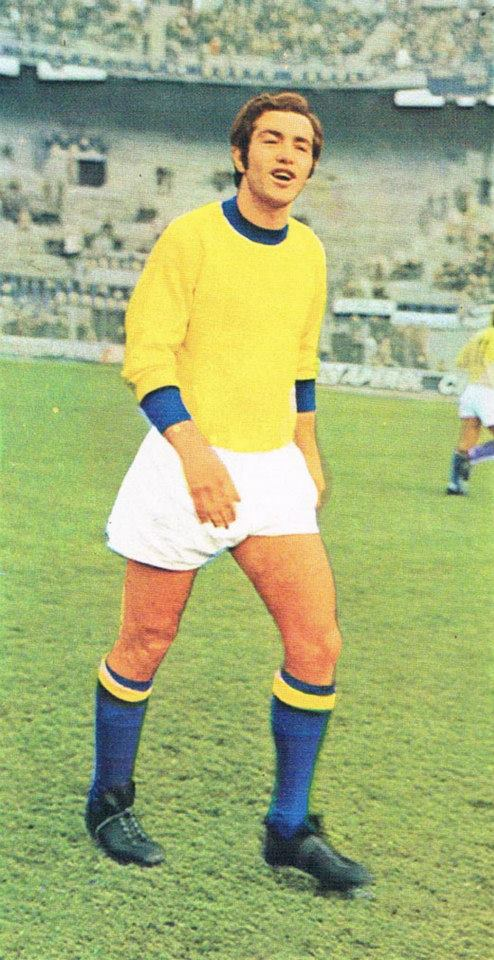

Personal information
- Date of birth: 27 July 1944
- Place of birth: Gallipoli, Italy
- Date of death: 3 September 2025 (aged 81)
- Height: 1.74 m (5 ft 9 in)
- Position: Forward

Senior career*
Years	Team	Apps	(Gls)
1963–1967	Lazio	79	(13)
1967–1968	Inter Milan	13	(1)
1968–1969	Roma	19	(2)
1969	Cesena	3	(1)
1969–1971	Verona	33	(1)
1971–1973	Catania	52	(5)
1973–1974	Frosinone	0	(0)
- * Club domestic league appearances and goals

Vito D'Amato (27 July 1944 – 3 September 2025) was an Italian professional footballer who played as a forward.

D'Amato was one of the few footballers from Gallipoli to play in Serie A, making his league debut during the 1964–65 season.

D'Amato died on 3 September 2025, at the age of 81.

== Honours ==
Roma

- Coppa Italia: 1968–69
