= Ferdinando Miniussi =

Italian footballer

Personal information
- Date of birth: 1 September 1940
- Place of birth: Trieste, Italy
- Date of death: 13 September 2001 (aged 61)
- Place of death: Cervignano del Friuli, Italy
- Height: 1.89 m (6 ft 2 1/2 in)
- Position: Goalkeeper

Senior career*
Years	Team	Apps	(Gls)
1959–1960	Moglia	0	(0)
1960–1961	Terzo Aquileia		
1961–1962	Triestina	8	(0)
1962–1963	Fondi	45	(0)
1964	Triestina	16	(0)
1964–1965	Varese	15	(0)
1965–1969	Internazionale	20	(0)
1967–1968	→ Bari (loan)	31	(0)
1969	Triestina	1	(0)
1969–1972	Udinese	111	(0)
1972–1973	Avellino	37	(0)
1973–1974	Barletta	36	(0)
- * Club domestic league appearances and goals

Ferdinando Miniussi (1 September 1940 in Trieste – 13 September 2001 in Cervignano del Friuli) was an Italian professional footballer who played as a goalkeeper.

== Honours ==
=== Club ===
Inter

- Serie A champion: 1965–66
