= Luís Vinício =

Brazilian footballer and manager

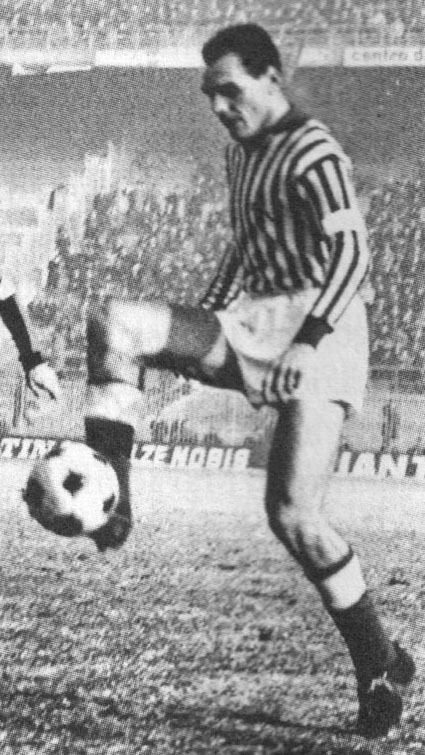
- Vinício with Vicenza in the 1960s

Personal information
- Full name: Luís Vinícius de Menezes
- Date of birth: 28 February 1932 (age 94)
- Place of birth: Belo Horizonte, Brazil
- Height: 1.80 m (5 ft 11 in)
- Position: Centre forward

Senior career*
Years	Team	Apps	(Gls)
1951–1954	Botafogo	42	(24)
1955–1960	Napoli	152	(69)
1960–1962	Bologna	47	(17)
1962–1966	Vicenza	116	(61)
1966–1967	Internazionale	8	(1)
1967–1968	Vicenza	25	(7)
Total		390	(179)

Managerial career
- 1968–1969: Internapoli
- 1969–1970: Brindisi
- 1970–1971: Ternana Terni
- 1971–1973: Brindisi
- 1973–1976: Napoli
- 1976–1978: Lazio
- 1978–1980: Napoli
- 1980–1982: Avellino
- 1982–1984: Pisa
- 1984–1986: Udinese
- 1986–1988: Avellino
- 1991–1992: Juve Stabia
- * Club domestic league appearances and goals

Luís Vinícius de Menezes, more famously known as Vinício (born 28 February 1932) is a former professional football player, who played as a centre forward. Although he is a Brazilian, Vinício played his entire career in Italy, and because of this, he was excluded from the Brazil national side, in a similar manner to José Altafini; unlike Altafini, however, Vinício chose not to play for the Italy national side. Following his professional footballing career, he later became a manager, who became known for introducing tactics based on Dutch total football in Italy.

== Playing career ==
Vinício was born in Belo Horizonte, Brazil. At age 23 he came to Italy, joining the Naples representative club Napoli during the 1955–56 season. He style was considered generous and powerful on the field, which soon gained him the nickname 'O lione (lion) from the Napoli faithful. In total for the club he played 152 games and scored 69 goals in a 5-year period.

He moved on next to Bologna in 1960; he performed well during his first season with the club, during which he managed to win the Mitropa Cup in 1961, but during the successive season, Vinício was used less frequently, due to competition from youngster Harald Nielsen.

In the summer of 1962 he returned disconsolate to Brazil, after finding little football action in recent years with Bologna. However, soon he was recalled to Italy from the management of Lanerossi Vicenza, who offered him a new contract. To Vinício, joining Vicenza was like a second birth in Italian football.

After an average first year, he re-found his form, and became extremely prolific in front of goal, scoring 17 goals in the 1963–64 season, which helped the club to a 6th place finish in Serie A. In 1964–65 his performances were still decisive, as he helped Vicenza to a tenth place finish in championship. The following season, he scored 25 goals, finishing the season as the Serie A top scorer; his top-scoring record of 25 goals in a single Serie A campaign would not be equalled again until Marco van Basten in 1991–92.

In the summer of 1966, he left Vicenza because Helenio Herrera signed Vinício to play for Internazionale. His tenure in nerazzurro did not bring much luck however; he competed only 8 games for the club and scored one goal.

For the final season of his playing career, he returned to Vicenza at age 36. This season saw him take his total goal scoring record, for all games player in Serie A during his career to over 150 goals.

== Coaching career ==
Following his professional footballing career, Vinício later became an experienced football manager, coaching many different clubs, including Lazio and Napoli; he won the 1971–72 Serie C title while coaching Brindisi, and narrowly missed out on the Serie A title during his time with Napoli (finishing two points behind Juventus in 1974–75), leading a side which became renowned for their exciting attacking football, inspired by the Dutch Total Football, in an era in which defensive catenaccio tactics still dominated Italy.

== Style of management ==
Vinício was known for his exciting attacking football tactics, which were inspired by Dutch Total Football, and which he introduced in Italy in an era in which defensive catenaccio tactics, which made use of man–to–man marking, still dominated in Italian football. His teams were known for using a fluid and attractive attacking style of play, as well as heavy pressing, the offside trap, and a zonal marking defensive system; during his time with Napoli, he usually employed a 4–4–2 formation, and made use of an offensive sweeper (normally Tarcisio Burgnich) as one of his team's central defenders, who was required to push forward and advance into midfield in order to start attacking plays.
