= Helenio Herrera =

Argentine-French footballer and manager (1910–1997)

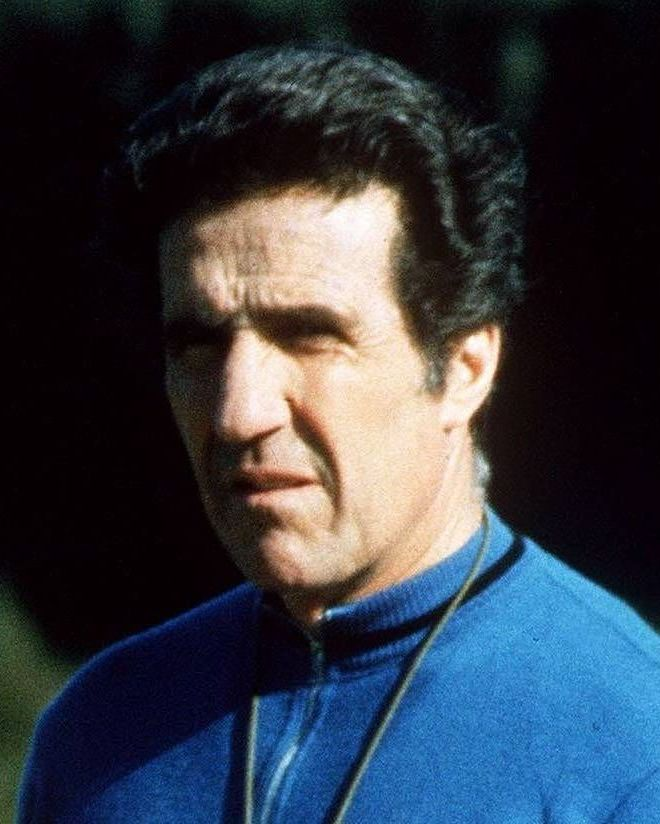
- Herrera with Inter Milan during the 1973–74 season

Personal information
- Full name: Helenio Herrera Gavilán
- Date of birth: 10 April 1910
- Place of birth: Buenos Aires, Argentina
- Date of death: 9 November 1997 (aged 87)
- Place of death: Venice, Italy
- Height: 1.75 m (5 ft 9 in)
- Position: Central defender

Senior career*
Years	Team	Apps	(Gls)
- Roches Noires
1931–1932	Racing de Casablanca		
1932–1933	CASG Paris		
1933–1935	Stade Français		
1935–1937	Charleville		
1937–1939	Excelsior Roubaix		
1940–1942	Red Star Olympique		
1942–1943	Stade Français		
1943–1944	EF Paris-Capitale		
1944–1945	Puteaux		

Managerial career
- 1944–1945: Puteaux
- 1945–1948: Stade Français
- 1948–1949: Real Valladolid
- 1949–1952: Atlético Madrid
- 1952: Málaga
- 1953: Deportivo de La Coruña
- 1953–1957: Sevilla
- 1957–1958: Belenenses
- 1958–1960: Barcelona
- 1960–1962: Spain
- 1960–1968: Inter Milan
- 1966–1967: Italy
- 1968–1970: Roma
- 1971–1972: Roma
- 1973–1974: Inter Milan
- 1978–1979: Rimini
- 1979–1981: Barcelona
- * Club domestic league appearances and goals

Helenio Herrera Gavilán (Spanish pronunciation: [eˈlenjo eˈreɾa ɣaβiˈlan]; 10 April 1910 – 9 November 1997) was an Argentine and naturalised French football player and manager. He is best remembered for his success with the Inter Milan team known as Grande Inter in the 1960s.

During his managerial career, Herrera won four La Liga titles in Spain (with Atlético Madrid and Barcelona) and three Serie A titles in Italy with Inter. He also guided Inter to European glory, winning two consecutive European Cups, among several other honours. He is regarded as one of the greatest managers of all time.

Herrera was arguably the first manager to collect credit for his teams' performances, in the process becoming a superstar in the world of football. Up to that time, managers were more marginal figures in a team. All teams throughout Europe were known for their headline-grabbing individual players, e.g. Di Stéfano's Real Madrid, whereas Inter during the 1960s is still referred to as "Herrera's Inter".

== Early life and playing career ==
Herrera was born in 1910 in Buenos Aires, Argentina, to immigrant parents from Spain. His father Francisco, who worked as a carpenter, was an exiled anarchist originally from Andalusia. His mother, Maria Gavilán Martínez, was a cleaner. In 1920, Herrera's family left Argentina for Casablanca, in what was then French Morocco, in search of a better life. In Casablanca, Herrera started his career as a footballer.

Playing as a central defender, in 1932 the 22-year-old Herrera earned a transfer from RC Casablanca to mainland France, to CASG in Paris. Before the onset of World War II, Herrera (or "H.H." as he was known) had spells at several French clubs. From 1933 to 1935 he was at Stade Français, from 1935 to 1937 at FCO Charleville (where he was called up for the France national team twice), and at Excelsior Roubaix from 1937 to 1939.

During the war, he played for five years at Red Star Paris, Stade Français, EF Paris-Capitale and Puteaux, where he started his managing career in 1944 as a player-manager, before retiring from playing in 1945, at 35 years of age. While he spent his career playing for established French clubs, Herrera did not win any notable silverware. His managing career, which coincided with the early beginnings of UEFA competitions, had a marked effect on the game's tactical development.

== Managing career ==
After his first season in Puteaux, Herrera rejoined Stade Français for a third time, now as manager. After three seasons with no trophies collected, the club's president opted to sell the club. Herrera moved to Spain, where he spent the next six years with Real Valladolid, Atlético Madrid (where he won La Liga in 1950 and 1951), Málaga, Deportivo de La Coruña and Sevilla, before moving to Portugal and a two-year tenure with Lisbon side Belenenses. Later, returning to Spain, he managed giants Barcelona, where he won various titles (including La Liga, twice), but several problems, including disagreements between him and star player Ladislao Kubala, forced him to leave the club in 1960.

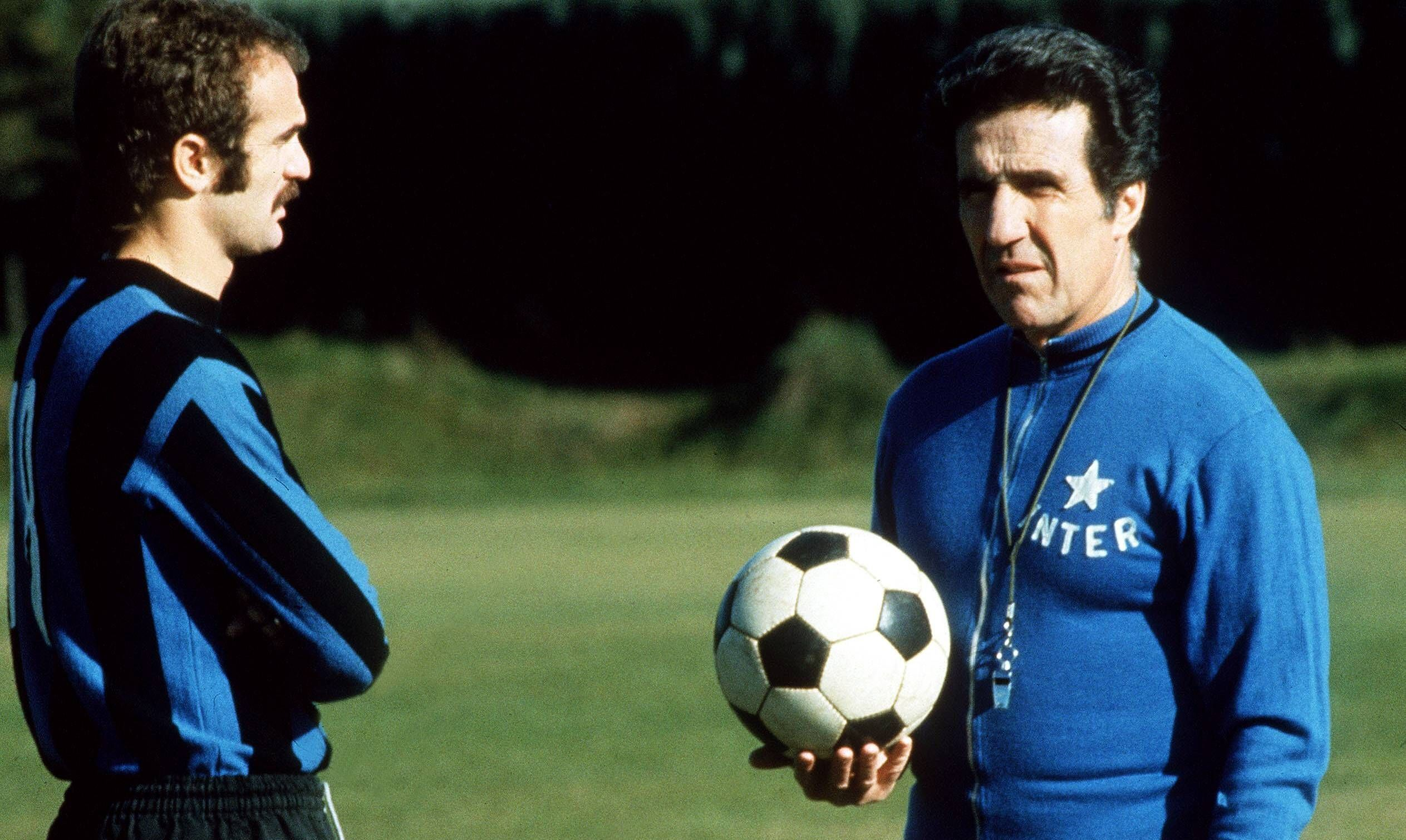
Sandro Mazzola and Herrera with Inter Milan in 1973

He immediately emigrated to Italy and signed with Inter Milan (where he was to remain until 1968), winning three Serie A titles and two European Cups during his stay with the club, where he used a 5–3–2 formation, and modified a tactic known as the Verrou (door bolt) – used by Karl Rappan – to include larger flexibility for counter-attacks; thus, the Catenaccio system was born. The side was later nicknamed Grande Inter, due to the club's successes under Herrera's eight–year spell, which saw the team win back–to–back European Cup titles in 1964 and 1965, as well as three Serie A titles, and two Intercontinental Cup titles. During this time he was also coaching Spain (between 1959 and 1962) and Italy (1966–67).

In 1968, Herrera moved to Roma, where he became the highest paid manager in the world, with a contract worth an estimated £150,000 per year. He won the Coppa Italia in his first season, but relations with club president Alvaro Marchini had already soured over the tragic death of his centre-forward Giuliano Taccola in the team dressing room at an away game against Cagliari. The following season, 1969–70, erratic results in the league gave Marchini the excuse to sack him.

He returned to management for a one-year stint with Inter for the 1973–74 season. Herrera then suffered a heart attack, did not want to coach full-time any more and retired in Venice, where he lived the rest of his life. While inactive between 1974 and 1978, Herrera returned briefly during the end of the decade, managing Rimini, and finally ending his career with a return to Barcelona for one-and-a-half seasons in 1980 and 1981.

== Manager profile ==
=== Influence ===
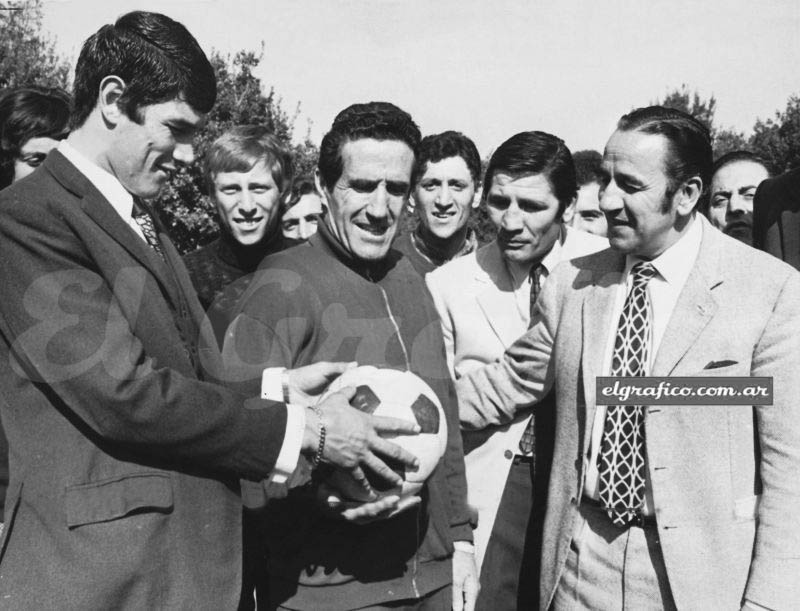
Herrera (center) along with boxer Carlos Monzón (left) and colleague Juan Carlos Lorenzo

In 2017, UEFA included Herrera among ten coaches who had made a major impact on football since the organisation's foundation in 1954. Herrera was a pioneer in the use of psychological motivation in football management, employing motivational slogans and emphasising mental preparation. He also imposed strict discipline, physical training and dietary controls, including lengthy pre-match retreats (ritiri). He also helped raise the public profile of football managers in Italy through his charismatic personality and media presence.

Tactically, Herrera developed a version of catenaccio that combined defensive organisation with rapid counter-attacks. His system notably allowed attacking full-back Giacinto Facchetti to advance forward while retaining defensive cover through a libero. UEFA described Herrera as the "king of catenaccio". Herrera advocated fast, vertical attacking play, aiming to reach the opposition's penalty area in no more than three passes.

=== Tactics and style of management ===
Herrera's standard formation at Inter was the 5–3–2 system, which almost always included a sweeper (usually the team's captain, Armando Picchi), as well as four man-marking defenders. He was openly dismissive of teams that had an obsession for dominating ball possession, declaring that "the ball always moves further, and more quickly, when there isn't a player behind it".

Although Herrera's Barcelona side was known for playing a fluid, attacking brand of football, his pragmatic Catenaccio tactics at Inter were often criticised for producing few goals, and for being dull, overly defensive, or even destructive; Herrera and several of Inter's players at the time refuted these claims, however, with Herrera later stating: "The problem is that most of the ones who copied me copied me wrongly. They forgot to include the attacking principles that my Catenaccio included. I had Picchi as a sweeper, yes, but I also had Facchetti, the first full-back to score as many goals as a forward".

Aside from the team's defensive strength and organisation when defending behind the ball, some of the key elements of Herrera's Grande Inter side of the 1960s were the use of vertical football and very quick, efficient counter-attacks, which allowed the team to score with few touches. This was made possible due to Herrera's use of very quick and energetic, attacking full-backs, such as Giacinto Facchetti, and Tarcisio Burgnich, who would often detach themselves from the back-line, and catch their opponents by surprise with their overlapping runs. Furthermore, the team's main creative force, Spanish deep-lying playmaker Luis Suárez, played a fundamental part in Inter's success during this period, due to his outstanding work-rate, technical skills, vision and passing range; these attributes enabled him to aid the team to win back possession, and subsequently launch quick attacks with accurate long balls out to the on-running full-backs, who would often go on either to score or assist the strikers.

After successive European Cups in 1964 and 1965, Helenio Herrera's Catenaccio style of play suffered a massive blow in the 1967 final in Lisbon, when they came up against Scottish champions Celtic of Glasgow, – nicknamed the Lisbon Lions – who consisted of a group of players who were all born within 30 miles of Celtic's home ground, Celtic Park. Celtic won the game 2–1 after coming back from a seventh-minute Mazzola penalty, with many pundits claiming this was a "victory for football" against the defensively-destructive Catenaccio.

== Personal life ==
Herrera was married three times and had eight children: Francis (b. 1937), Hélène (b. 1938), Linda (b. 1941), Daniéle (b. 1942), Helenio Angel (b. 1952), Rocío (b. 1957), Helios (b. 1972) and Luna (b. 1974), who was adopted. Five of his children were born in France, two in Spain and one in Italy.

== Managerial statistics ==
As of match played on 24 March 2023

Managerial record by team and tenure
Team	Nat	From	To	Record				
Team	Nat	From	To	G	W	D	L	Win %
Stade Français	(France)	5 August 1945	30 June 1948	122	70	22	30	57.38
Real Valladolid	(Spain)	4 July 1948	22 June 1949	26	10	2	14	38.46
Atlético Madrid	(Spain)	23 June 1949	28 December 1952	115	55	19	41	47.83
Deportivo de La Coruña	(Spain)	19 January 1953	19 July 1953	21	9	3	9	42.86
Sevilla	(Spain)	1 August 1953	28 July 1957	138	72	16	50	52.17
Belenenses	(Portugal)	13 August 1957	25 April 1958	19	9	4	6	47.37
Barcelona	(Spain)	25 April 1958	30 May 1960	94	71	10	13	75.53
Inter Milan	(Italy)	9 July 1960	30 June 1968	343	194	86	63	56.56
Spain	(Spain)	13 March 1959	21 April 1960	6	5	0	1	83.33
Spain	(Spain)	26 May 1962	7 June 1962	3	1	0	2	33.33
Italy (Technical Commission)	(Italy)	1 November 1966	2 March 1967	4	3	1	0	75.00
Roma	(Italy)	9 July 1968	5 April 1971	114	37	47	30	32.46
Roma	(Italy)	29 August 1971	10 April 1973	62	23	20	19	37.10
Inter Milan	(Italy)	19 July 1973	5 February 1974	24	12	7	5	50.00
Rimini	(Italy)	5 March 1979	30 April 1979	8	1	3	4	12.50
Barcelona	(Spain)	6 March 1980	18 June 1980	13	6	4	3	46.15
Barcelona	(Spain)	6 November 1980	12 June 1981	36	24	6	6	66.67
Total				1,148	602	250	296	52.44

== Honours ==
=== Manager ===
Atlético Madrid

- La Liga: 1949–50, 1950–51
- Copa Eva Duarte: 1951

Barcelona

- La Liga: 1958–59, 1959–60
- Copa del Rey: 1958–59, 1980–81
- Inter-Cities Fairs Cup: 1958–60

Inter Milan

- Serie A: 1962–63, 1964–65, 1965–66
- European Cup: 1963–64, 1964–65
- Intercontinental Cup: 1964, 1965

Roma

- Coppa Italia: 1968–69
- Anglo-Italian Cup: 1972

Individual

- Italian Football Hall of Fame (posthumous): 2015
- World Soccer Greatest Managers of All Time: 4th place (2013)
- ESPN Greatest Managers of All Time: 5th place (2013)
- France Football Greatest Managers of All Time: 7th place (2019)
- FourFourTwo Greatest Managers of All Time: 8th place (2023)

== See also ==
- List of football managers with the most matches
