= 1965–66 Serie A =

63rd season of top-tier Italian football

Serie A
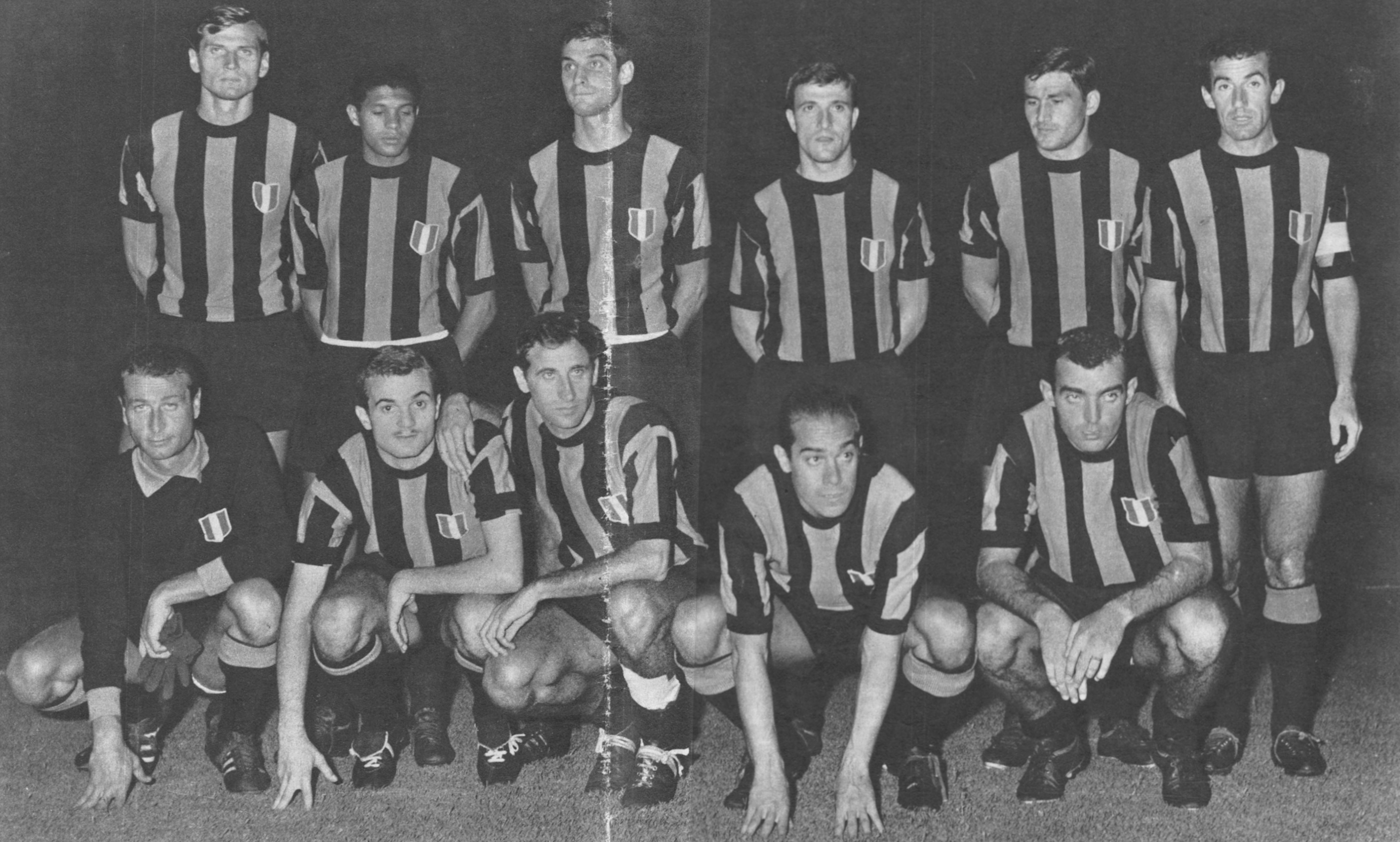
- 1965–66 Serie A winning Internazionale squad
- Season: 1965–66
- Dates: 5 September 1965 – 22 May 1966
- Champions: Internazionale; 10th title
- Relegated: Sampdoria; Catania; Varese
- European Cup: Internazionale
- Cup Winners' Cup: Fiorentina
- Inter-Cities Fairs Cup: Bologna; Napoli; Juventus
- Matches: 306
- Goals: 668 (2.18 per match)
- Top goalscorer: Luís Vinício (25 goals)

The 1965–66 Serie A season was won by Internazionale.

Serie A 1965-66 team distribution

== Teams ==
Brescia, Napoli and SPAL had been promoted from Serie B.

== Final classification ==
Pos	Team	Pld	W	D	L	GF	GA	GD	Pts	Qualification or relegation
1	Internazionale (C)	34	20	10	4	70	28	+42	50	Qualification to European Cup
2	Bologna	34	19	8	7	60	37	+23	46	Chosen for Inter-Cities Fairs Cup
3	Napoli	34	17	11	6	44	27	+17	45	Chosen for Inter-Cities Fairs Cup
4	Fiorentina	34	16	11	7	45	22	+23	43	Qualification to Cup Winners' Cup
5	Juventus	34	13	16	5	38	23	+15	42	Chosen for Inter-Cities Fairs Cup
6	Vicenza	34	13	14	7	44	34	+10	40	
7	Milan	34	13	12	9	43	33	+10	38	
8	Roma	34	13	10	11	28	31	−3	36	
9	Brescia	34	12	8	14	43	44	−1	32	
10	Torino	34	9	13	12	31	34	−3	31	
11	Cagliari	34	10	10	14	36	37	−1	30	
12	Foggia	34	8	13	13	22	30	−8	29	
12	Lazio	34	8	13	13	28	41	−13	29	
12	Atalanta	34	9	11	14	24	37	−13	29	
15	SPAL	34	9	10	15	38	45	−7	28	
16	Sampdoria (R)	34	9	9	16	27	47	−20	27	Relegation to Serie B
17	Catania (R)	34	5	12	17	24	56	−32	22	Relegation to Serie B
18	Varese (R)	34	2	11	21	23	62	−39	15	Relegation to Serie B

Source: Panini
(C) Champions; (R) Relegated

== Results ==
Home \ Away	ATA	BOL	BRE	CAG	CTN	FIO	FOG	INT	JUV	LRV	LAZ	MIL	NAP	ROM	SAM	SPA	TOR	VAR
Atalanta		4–1	0–0	1–0	3–2	1–1	1–3	0–2	0–0	1–1	0–0	0–0	1–0	0–2	1–0	2–0	0–0	1–0
Bologna	3–0		2–1	1–0	2–0	3–2	1–0	2–1	0–1	1–3	3–1	4–1	0–1	3–1	2–1	1–3	2–0	3–1
Brescia	2–0	0–1		0–0	4–1	1–2	4–0	2–2	4–0	1–0	2–1	0–3	0–0	3–0	1–0	2–2	2–1	2–2
Cagliari	0–0	1–3	1–0		3–1	0–1	1–0	0–1	2–1	3–0	3–0	1–2	0–2	4–0	1–1	3–0	3–2	1–1
Catania	0–0	1–1	1–1	2–1		0–3	0–0	1–0	1–1	1–3	0–0	1–1	0–0	1–0	2–3	0–0	0–2	3–0
Fiorentina	1–0	1–3	2–0	2–0	0–0		1–1	0–0	0–1	1–1	2–0	1–0	0–0	0–1	5–0	1–0	1–1	4–0
Foggia	2–0	2–0	1–0	0–0	3–0	0–0		1–3	0–0	0–0	1–1	0–0	0–1	1–0	3–0	1–0	0–0	0–0
Internazionale	1–0	0–0	7–0	2–0	3–1	0–0	5–0		3–1	3–2	4–1	1–1	0–0	2–2	2–1	1–1	4–0	5–2
Juventus	1–1	0–0	3–1	0–0	1–0	3–0	1–0	0–0		4–1	0–0	3–0	0–0	0–0	2–1	3–0	2–0	3–1
Vicenza	1–1	1–1	4–1	1–1	1–0	2–0	0–0	1–1	2–2		1–0	1–0	2–0	1–1	2–1	3–1	0–0	1–0
Lazio	0–1	1–1	0–3	3–1	1–1	0–0	2–0	1–3	0–1	2–1		0–0	2–1	0–0	0–0	2–2	1–0	2–1
Milan	1–0	1–1	2–1	2–2	6–1	1–2	1–0	1–2	2–1	1–1	0–2		4–1	3–1	2–0	1–1	0–0	3–1
Napoli	5–1	1–1	1–0	2–0	3–0	0–4	1–0	3–1	1–0	4–2	2–0	1–0		1–0	2–2	4–2	0–0	2–2
Roma	1–0	3–1	1–1	1–0	1–1	0–2	1–0	2–0	1–1	1–0	0–1	1–0	0–0		1–0	0–2	1–0	2–0
Sampdoria	2–0	0–2	0–2	1–1	1–0	0–3	2–1	0–5	0–0	0–0	2–1	1–2	1–0	0–1		1–0	1–1	2–0
SPAL	3–1	0–3	0–2	3–0	3–0	1–2	2–1	0–1	2–2	0–0	2–0	1–1	1–2	2–1	1–1		0–0	2–0
Torino	2–1	2–4	2–0	0–0	4–0	1–0	2–0	1–2	0–0	1–3	2–2	0–1	1–1	1–1	1–0	1–0		2–0
Varese	0–2	1–4	2–0	1–3	1–2	1–1	0–0	1–3	0–3	2–5	1–1	0–0	0–2	0–0	1–2	1–1	2–1	

Source: Almanacco Illustrato del Calcio - La Storia 1898-2004, Panini Edizioni, Modena, September 2005 (in Italian)
Legend: Blue = home team win; Yellow = draw; Red = away team win.

== Top goalscorers ==
Rank	Player	Club	Goals
1	(Brazil) Luís Vinício	Vicenza	25
2	(Italy) Angelo Sormani	Milan	21
3	(Italy) Sandro Mazzola	Internazionale	19
4	(Brazil) (Italy) José Altafini	Napoli	13
4	(Italy) Virginio De Paoli	Brescia	13
4	(Brazil) Cané	Napoli	13
7	(Germany) Helmut Haller	Bologna	12
7	(Denmark) Harald Nielsen	Bologna	12
7	(Italy) Angelo Domenghini	Internazionale	12
7	(Italy) Giancarlo Salvi	Sampdoria	12
11	(Italy) Luigi Riva	Cagliari	11
11	(Italy) Enrico Muzzio	SPAL	11
11	(Sweden) Kurt Hamrin	Fiorentina	11

== Attendances ==
#	Club	Average
1	Napoli	67,977
2	Internazionale	49,955
3	Milan	37,743
4	Bologna	30,119
5	Roma	28,897
6	Fiorentina	27,537
7	Brescia	26,535
8	Juventus	23,373
9	Lazio	21,486
10	Torino	21,171
11	Cagliari	17,137
12	Atalanta	16,799
13	Foggia	14,722
14	Sampdoria	13,275
15	SPAL	12,778
16	Catania	12,416
17	Varese	9,974
18	Vicenza	9,534
