= 1967–68 Juventus FC season =

Italian football club season

Juventus Football Club
1967–68 season
- President: Vittore Catella
- Manager: Heriberto Herrera
- Stadium: Comunale
- Serie A: 3rd (in 1968–69 Inter-Cities Fairs Cup)
- Coppa Italia: First round
- European Cup: Semifinals
- Top goalscorer: Menichelli (11)
Home colours	Away colours

During the 1967–68 season Juventus competed in Serie A, Coppa Italia and European Cup.

== Summary ==
The club clinched "in extremis" the arrival of Swedish winger Roger Magnusson, however, the midfielder played only 6 matches in European Cup scoring 2 goals. Also, future club legend midfielder Franco Causio made his debut as bianconero.

In League the squad finished in a decent third place just below Milan and Napoli. In Coppa the team was early eliminated in first round. The campaign is best remembered by the squad reaching the semifinals of the European Cup for the first time ever. After a dramatic three-leg series against German club Eintracht Braunschweig, the team lost the two matches to Benfica with a superb performance of Eusebio.

== Squad ==
Note: Flags indicate national team as defined under FIFA eligibility rules; some limited exceptions apply. Players may hold more than one non-FIFA nationality.

Pos.	Nation	Player
GK	ITA	Roberto Anzolin
GK	ITA	Angelo Martino Colombo
GK	ITA	Massimo Piloni
GK	ITA	Pietro Fioravanti
DF	ITA	Gianfranco Leoncini
DF	ITA	Sandro Salvadore
DF	ITA	Ernesto Castano (Captain)
DF	ITA	Giancarlo Bercellino
DF	ITA	Benito Sarti
DF	ITA	Alberto Coramini
DF	ITA	Gianluigi Roveta
MF	ITA	Luigi Simoni

Pos.	Nation	Player
MF	BRA	Chinesinho
MF	ESP	Luis del Sol
MF	ITA	Carlo Volpi
MF	ITA	Guido Onor
MF	ITA	Franco Causio
MF	ITA	Giampaolo Menichelli
MF	ITA	Adolfo Gori
MF	ITA	Erminio Favalli
MF	ITA	Giovanni Sacco
FW	ITA	Virginio De Paoli
FW	ITA	Gianfranco Zigoni
FW	SWE	Roger Magnusson

=== Transfers ===
In
Pos.	Name	from	Type
FW	Roger Magnusson	1.FC Köln	
MF	Luigi Simoni	Torino	
MF	Carlo Volpi	Mantua	
GK	Pietro Fioravanti		
DF	Gianluigi Roveta		
MF	Guido Onor		
MF	Franco Causio	US Sambenedettese	

Out
Pos.	Name	To	Type
MF	Gino Stacchini	Mantua	
DF	Elio Rinero	Hellas Verona	

== Competitions ==
=== Serie A ===
==== League table ====
Pos	Team	Pld	W	D	L	GF	GA	GD	Pts	Qualification or relegation
1	Milan (C)	30	18	10	2	53	24	+29	46	Qualification to European Cup
2	Napoli	30	13	11	6	34	24	+10	37	Qualified to Inter-Cities Fairs Cup
3	Juventus	30	13	10	7	33	29	+4	36	Qualified to Inter-Cities Fairs Cup
4	Fiorentina	30	13	9	8	35	23	+12	35	Qualified to Inter-Cities Fairs Cup
5	Internazionale	30	13	7	10	46	34	+12	33	

Source: Panini
(C) Champions

==== Results by round ====
Round	1	2	3	4	5	6	7	8	9	10	11	12	13	14	15	16	17	18	19	20	21	22	23	24	25	26	27	28	29	30
Ground	H	A	H	A	H	A	H	A	H	A	H	A	H	A	H	A	H	A	H	A	H	A	H	A	H	A	H	A	H	A
Result	W	D	W	D	L	D	L	L	D	W	D	W	W	D	W	D	W	L	D	L	L	D	W	L	W	W	W	D	W	W
Position	1	3	1	2	5	5	8	9	11	7	8	7	4	4	3	3	2	3	3	5	7	7	6	7	7	6	4	5	4	3

Source: Competitive matches
A = Away; H = Home; W = Win; D = Draw; L = Loss; = Leader, 1968-69 European Cup; = 1968–69 Inter-Cities Fairs Cup

==== Matches ====
24 September 1967 1	Juventus	3–1	Mantua	Turin
15:00 CET	Spelta 13' (o.g.); De Paoli 78'; Menichelli 81'		56' (o.g.) Corelli	Stadium: Comunale; Referee: Bernardis

1 October 1967 2	Atalanta	0–0	Juventus	Bergamo
15:00 CET				Stadium: Comunale; Referee: Sbardella

8 October 1967 3	Juventus	3–0	Varese	Turin
15:00 CET	Sacco 53'; Zigoni 64'; Leoncini 71'Marcatori			Stadium: Comunale; Referee: Di Tonno

15 October 1967 4	Bologna	0–0	Juventus	Bologna
15:00 CET				Stadium: Comunale; Referee: Lo Bello

22 October 1967 5	Juventus	0–4	Torino	Turin
14:30 CET			3', 7', 60' Combin; 67' Carelli	Stadium: Comunale; Referee: Francescon (Padua)

29 October 1967 6	Milan	0–0	Juventus	Milan
14:30 CET				Stadium: San Siro; Referee: Lo Bello

5 November 1967 7	Juventus	0–1	AS Roma	Turin
14:30 CET			76' Capello	Stadium: Comunale; Referee: Carminati

12 November 1967 8	Cagliari	2–0	Juventus	Cagliari
14:30 CET	Greatti 43'; Rizzo 71'			Stadium: Stadio Amsicora; Referee: Monti

26 November 1967 9	Juventus	2–2	Fiorentina	Turin
14:30 CET	Zigoni 38'; Bercellino 81' (pen.)		60' (o.g.) Salvadore; 71' Pirovano	Stadium: Comunale; Referee: Sbardella

3 December 1967 10	Lanerossi Vicenza	0–2	Juventus	Vicenza
14:30 CET			29' Chinesinho; 76' Menichelli	Stadium: Romeo Menti; Referee: Genel

9 December 1967 11	Juventus	1–1	SSC Napoli	Turin
14:30 CET	Pogliana 39' (o.g.)		78' Altafini	Stadium: Comunale; Referee: Francescon (Padua)

17 December 1967 12	Brescia	0–1	Juventus	Brescia
14:30 CET			29' De Paoli	Stadium: Stadio Mario Rigamonti; Referee: Picasso

31 December 1967 13	Juventus	3–2	Inter	Turin
14:30 CET	Leoncini 14'; De Paoli 60'; Bercellino 75' (o.g.)		17' Domenghini; 89' Cappellini	Stadium: Comunale; Referee: Monti

7 January 1968 14	Sampdoria	1–1	Juventus	Genoa
14:30 CET	Cristin 48'		35' Zigoni	Stadium: Stadio Luigi Ferraris; Referee: Carminati

14 January 1968 15	Juventus	2–0	SPAL	Turin
14:30 CET	Leoncini 36'; De Paoli 64'			Stadium: Comunale; Referee: D'Agostini

21 January 1968 16	Mantua	0–0	Juventus	Mantua
14:30 CET				Stadium: Stadio Danilo Martelli; Referee: Pieroni

27 January 1968 17	Juventus	2–1	Atalanta	Turin
14:30 CET	De Paoli 37'; Chinesinho 73'		41' Danova	Stadium: Comunale; Referee: Branzoni

4 February 1968 18	Varese	5–0	Juventus	Varese
15:00 CET	Anastasi 20', 64', 87'; Leonardi 29'; Vastola 55'			Stadium: Stadio Franco Ossola; Referee: Sbardella

11 February 1968 19	Juventus	0–0	Bologna	Turin
15:00 CET				Stadium: Comunale; Referee: Pieroni

18 February 1968 20	Torino	2–1	Juventus	Turin
15:00 CET	Facchin 33'; Agroppi 37'		13' De Paoli	Stadium: Comunale; Referee: Genel

24 February 1968 21	Juventus	1–2	Milan	Turin
15:00 CET	Zigoni 22'		14' Prati; 48' Hamrin	Stadium: Comunale; Referee: Francescon

3 March 1968 22	AS Roma	0–0	Juventus	Rome
15:00 CET				Stadium: Olimpico; Referee: Lo Bello

10 March 1968 23	Juventus	2–0	Cagliari	Turin
15:00 CET	Menichelli 64', 69'			Stadium: Comunale; Referee: De Marchi

17 March 1968 24	Fiorentina	2–0	Juventus	Florence
15:00 CET	Maraschi 33'; Brugnera 90'			Stadium: Comunale; Referee: Toselli

24 March 1968 25	Juventus	1–0	Lanerossi Vicenza	Turin
15:00 CET	De Paoli 39'			Stadium: Comunale; Referee: Pieroni

31 March 1968 26	SSC Napoli	1–2	Juventus	Naples
15:30 CET	Juliano 84'		48' De Paoli; 70' Chinesinho	Stadium: Stadio San Paolo; Referee: Vacchini

14 April 1968 27	Juventus	2–1	Brescia	Turin
15:30 CET	Zigoni 38'; Del Sol 76'		21' (o.g.) Sacco	Stadium: Comunale; Referee: Di Tonno

28 April 1968 28	Inter	0–0	Juventus	Milan
16:00 CET				Stadium: San Siro; Referee: Pieroni

5 May 1968 29	Juventus	3–1	Sampdoria	Turin
16:00 CET	Vincenzi 56' (o.g.); Zigoni 67'; Menichelli 76'		14' Francesconi	Stadium: Comunale; Referee: Vacchini

12 May 1968 30	SPAL	0–1	Juventus	Ferrara
16:00 CET			9' Zigoni	Stadium: Comunale; Referee: Angonese

=== Coppa Italia ===
==== First round ====
10 September 1967	Juventus	0–0	Varese	Turin
17:30 CEST				Stadium: Comunale; Referee: Picasso (Chiavari)

Varese advanced to the Second round after a coin toss.

=== European Cup ===
==== First round ====
20 September 1967 1	Olympiacos (Greece)	0–0	(Italy) Juventus	Piraeus
16:15 CEST				Stadium: Geōrgios Karaiskakīs Stadium; Attendance: 40 000; Referee: (Socialist Federal Republic of Yugoslavia) Horvat

11 October 1967 2	Juventus (Italy)	2–0	(Greece) Olympiacos	Turin
15:00 CET	Zigoni 12'; Menichelli 49'			Stadium: Comunale; Referee: (Switzerland) Droz

==== Second round ====
29 November 1967 1	Juventus (Italy)	1–0	(Romania) Rapid Bucharest	Turin
15:00 CET	Magnusson 58'			Stadium: Comunale; Attendance: 19 452; Referee: (Hungary) Emsberger

13 December 1967 2	Rapid Bucharest (Romania)	0–0	(Italy) Juventus	Bucharest
12:30 CET				Stadium: Stadionul Republicii; Attendance: 12 000; Referee: (West Germany) Ovest Riegg

==== Quarterfinals ====
31 January 1968 1	Eintracht Braunschweig (West Germany)	3–2	(Italy) Juventus	Braunschweig
20:00 CET	Kaack 28'; Dulz 37'; Berg 38'		12' (o.g.) Kaack; 82' Sacco	Stadium: Eintracht-Stadion; Attendance: 29 963; Referee: (Switzerland) Droz

28 February 1968 2	Juventus (Italy)	1–0	(West Germany) Eintracht Braunschweig	Turin
15:00 CET	Bercellino 88' (pen.)			Stadium: Comunale; Attendance: 37 918; Referee: (Austria) Schiller

20 March 1968 tie-breaker	Juventus (Italy)	1–0	(West Germany) Eintracht Braunschweig	Bern
20:15 CET	Magnusson 56'			Stadium: Wankdorfstadion; Attendance: 44 700; Referee: (Switzerland) Dienst

==== Semifinals ====
9 May 1968 1	Benfica (Portugal)	2–0	(Italy) Juventus	Lisbon
21:45 CET	Torres 63'; Eusébio 69'			Stadium: Estádio da Luz; Attendance: 69 375; Referee: (France) Barde

15 May 1968 2	Juventus (Italy)	0–1	(Portugal) Benfica	Turin
21:15 CET			68' Eusébio	Stadium: Comunale; Attendance: 65 500; Referee: (West Germany) Est Glöckner

=== Statistics ===
No.	Pos	Nat	Player	Total		Serie A		Coppa Italia		European Cup	
No.	Pos	Nat	Player	Apps	Goals	Apps	Goals	Apps	Goals	Apps	Goals
	GK	(Italy) ITA	Roberto Anzolin	33	-28	24	-22	1	-0	8	-6
	DF	(Italy) ITA	Gianfranco Leoncini	39	3	29	3	1	0	9	0
	DF	(Italy) ITA	Sandro Salvadore	37	0	28	0	1	0	8	0
	DF	(Italy) ITA	Giancarlo Bercellino	32	3	24	2	0	0	8	1
	DF	(Italy) ITA	Ernesto Castano	26	0	18	0	1	0	7	0
	MF	(Brazil) BRA	Chinesinho	32	3	23	3	1	0	8	0
	MF	(Spain) ESP	Luis del Sol	33	1	24	1	0	0	9	0
	MF	(Italy) ITA	Giovanni Sacco	32	2	25	1	1	0	6	1
	MF	(Italy) ITA	Giampaolo Menichelli	26	6	20	5	1	0	5	1
	FW	(Italy) ITA	Virginio De Paoli	24	8	21	8	0	0	3	0
	FW	(Italy) ITA	Gianfranco Zigoni	31	8	22	7	1	0	8	1
	GK	(Italy) ITA	Angelo Colombo	6	-5	5	-5	0	-0	1	-0
	MF	(Italy) ITA	Erminio Favalli	13	1	12	0	0	0	1	1
	DF	(Italy) ITA	Alberto Coramini	14	0	11	0	0	0	3	0
	MF	(Italy) ITA	Luigi Simoni	14	0	11	0	1	0	2	0
	DF	(Italy) ITA	Benito Sarti	13	0	10	0	1	0	2	0
	DF	(Italy) ITA	Gianluigi Roveta	9	0	7	0	0	0	2	0
	MF	(Italy) ITA	Adolfo Gori	11	0	7	0	1	0	3	0
	MF	(Italy) ITA	Carlo Volpi	6	0	5	0	1	0		
	GK	(Italy) ITA	Pietro Fioravanti	2	-2	2	-2				
	MF	(Italy) ITA	Guido Onor	2	0	2	0				
	MF	(Italy) ITA	Franco Causio	1	0	1	0				
	FW	(Sweden) SWE	Roger Magnusson	6	2	0	0	0	0	6	2
	GK	(Italy) ITA	Massimo Piloni								

== Also read ==
- Almanacco illustrato del calcio – La storia 1898–2004. Modena: Panini. 2004.
- Calciatori 1966–67'. Modena: Panini. 1994.
- Chiesa, Carlo F. Il grande romanzo dello scudetto. da Calcio 2000, 2002 and 2003.
- l'Unità, 1966 and 1967.
- La Stampa, 1966 and 1967.
