= 1966–67 Juventus FC season =

Italian football club season

Juventus Football Club
1966–67 season
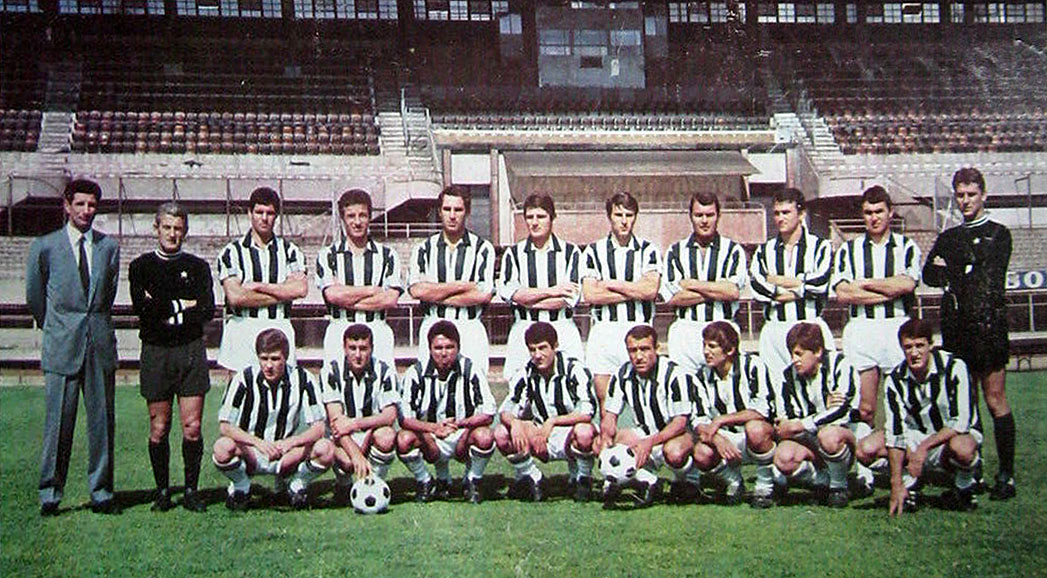
- Chairman: Vittore Catella
- Manager: Heriberto Herrera
- Serie A: 1st (in European Cup)
- Coppa Italia: Semifinals
- Fairs Cup: Quarterfinals
- Top goalscorer: Menichelli (11)
Home colours	Away colours

During the 1966–67 season Juventus competed in Serie A, Coppa Italia and Fairs Cup.

== Summary ==
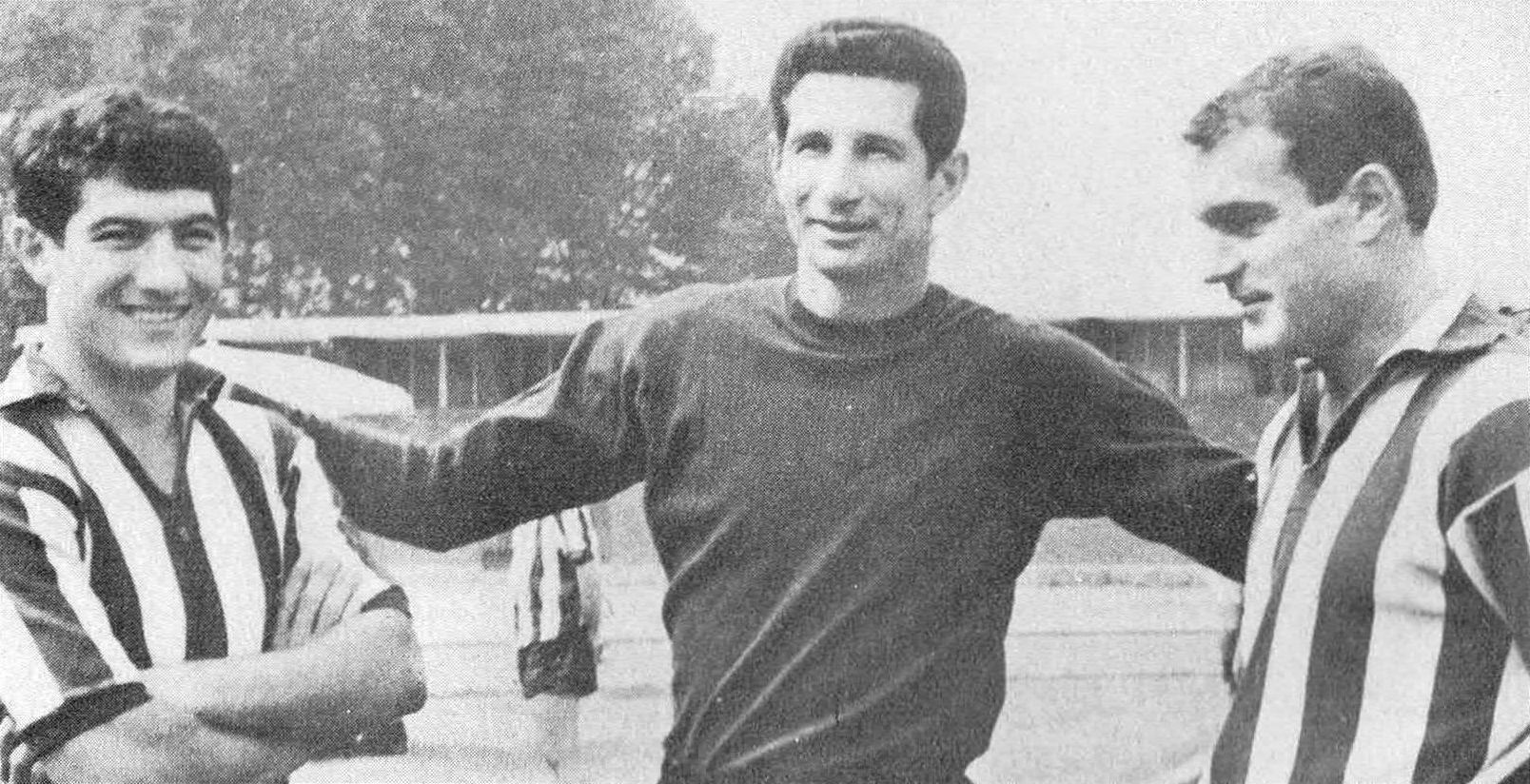
The confirmed coach Heriberto Herrera in the preseason between the team's two new acquisitions, winger Erminio Favalli (left) and forward Virginio De Paoli (right).

The club face the ban over transfers of foreign players imposed by Italian Federation of Football to all teams in Serie A and it will not lift until 1980. After 6 years, Juventus clinched the national title again winning the race against La Grande Inter.

== Squad ==
Note: Flags indicate national team as defined under FIFA eligibility rules; some limited exceptions apply. Players may hold more than one non-FIFA nationality.

Pos.	Nation	Player
GK	ITA	Roberto Anzolin
GK	ITA	Angelo Martino Colombo
DF	ITA	Gianfranco Leoncini
DF	ITA	Sandro Salvadore
DF	ITA	Ernesto Castano
DF	ITA	Giancarlo Bercellino
DF	ITA	Benito Sarti
DF	ITA	Elio Rinero
DF	ITA	Alberto Coramini

Pos.	Nation	Player
MF	ITA	Giampaolo Menichelli
MF	BRA	Cinesinho
MF	ITA	Adolfo Gori
MF	ESP	Luis del Sol
MF	ITA	Erminio Favalli
MF	ITA	Giovanni Sacco
MF	ITA	Gino Stacchini
FW	ITA	Virginio De Paoli
FW	ITA	Gianfranco Zigoni

== Competitions ==
=== Serie A ===
==== League table ====
Pos	Team	Pld	W	D	L	GF	GA	GD	Pts	Qualification or relegation
1	Juventus (C)	34	18	13	3	44	19	+25	49	Qualification to European Cup
2	Internazionale	34	19	10	5	59	22	+37	48	
3	Bologna	34	18	9	7	48	27	+21	45	Chosen for Inter-Cities Fairs Cup
4	Napoli	34	17	10	7	46	23	+23	44	Chosen for Inter-Cities Fairs Cup
5	Fiorentina	34	15	13	6	53	29	+24	43	Chosen for Inter-Cities Fairs Cup

Source: Panini
(C) Champions

==== Results by round ====
Round	1	2	3	4	5	6	7	8	9	10	11	12	13	14	15	16	17	18	19	20	21	22	23	24	25	26	27	28	29	30	31	32	33	34
Ground	A	H	A	H	A	H	A	H	A	A	H	A	H	A	H	H	A	H	A	H	A	H	A	H	A	H	H	A	H	A	H	A	A	H
Result	W	W	W	D	D	W	D	W	W	L	W	W	D	D	D	W	D	D	W	W	D	D	D	W	D	W	W	L	W	L	W	D	W	W
Position	1	1	1	3	3	2	3	2	2	2	2	1	2	2	2	2	2	2	2	2	2	2	2	2	2	2	2	2	2	2	2	2	2	1

Source: Competitive matches
A = Away; H = Home; W = Win; D = Draw; L = Loss; = Leader, 1967-68 European Cup; = 1967–68 Inter-Cities Fairs Cup

==== Matches ====
18 September 1966 1	Atalanta	0–2	Juventus	Bergamo
		Report	39' Cinesinho; 63' Leoncini	Stadium: Comunale; Referee: Mario Bernardis

25 September 1966 2	Juventus	3–0	Lecce	Turin
	Leoncini 45'; Menichelli 64'; De Paoli 89'	Report		Stadium: Comunale; Referee: Priamo Varazzani

2 October 1966 3	Fiorentina	1–2	Juventus	Florence
	Hamrin 77'	Report	43' Salvadore; 77' De Paoli	Stadium: Comunale; Referee: Concetto Lo Bello

9 October 1966 4	Juventus	0–0	Brescia	Turin
		Report		Stadium: Comunale; Referee: Paolo Toselli

16 October 1966 5	Torino	0–0	Juventus	Turin
		Report		Stadium: Comunale; Referee: Mario Bernardis

23 October 1966 6	Juventus	3–0	Foggia	Turin
	Leoncini 29'; Menichelli 32', 70'	Report		Stadium: Comunale; Referee: Danilo Bigi

6 November 1966 7	SPAL	1–1	Juventus	Ferrara
	Rozzoni 14'	Report	70' (o.g.) Bozzao	Stadium: Comunale; Referee: Francesco Francescon

13 November 1966 8	Juventus	1–0	Cagliari	Turin
	De Paoli 82'	Report		Stadium: Comunale; Referee: Concetto Lo Bello

20 November 1966 9	Napoli	0–1	Juventus	Naples
		Report	86' Favalli	Stadium: Stadio San Paolo; Referee: Antonio Sbardella

4 December 1966 10	Roma	1–0	Juventus	Rome
	G. Bercellino 90' (o.g.)	Report		Stadium: Stadio Olimpico; Referee: Aurelio Angonese

11 December 1966 11	Juventus	2–1	Bologna	Turin
	Menichelli 3'; Salvadore 72'	Report	40' Pascutti	Stadium: Comunale; Referee: Bruno De Marchi

18 December 1966 12	Venezia	0–2	Juventus	Venice
		Report	35' Salvadore; 39' (pen.) De Paoli	Stadium: Stadio Pier Luigi Penzo; Referee: Alessandro D'Agostini

24 December 1966 13	Juventus	1–1	Milan	Turin
	De Paoli 80'	Report	34' (o.g.) Castano	Stadium: Comunale; Referee: Fulvio Pieroni

31 December 1966 14	Inter	1–1	Juventus	Milan
	Mazzola 75'	Report	44' Menichelli	Stadium: Stadio San Siro; Referee: Antonio Sbardella

8 January 1967 15	Juventus	1–1	Mantua	Turin
	Zigoni 3'	Report	80' Trombini	Stadium: Comunale; Referee: Cesare Gussoni

15 January 1967 16	Juventus	2–0	Lanerossi	Turin
	G. Bercellino 58'; De Paoli 69'	Report		Stadium: Comunale; Referee: Fabio Monti

22 January 1967 17	Lazio	0–0	Juventus	Rome
		Report		Stadium: Stadio Olimpico; Referee: Bruno De Marchi

29 January 1967 18	Juventus	0–0	Atalanta	Turin
		Report		Stadium: Comunale; Referee: Francesco Francescon

5 February 1967 19	Lecce	1–3	Juventus	Lecce
	Salvadore 64' (o.g.)	Report	41' Gori; 63' De Paoli; 87' Zigoni	Stadium: Mario Rigamonti; Referee: Antonio Di Tonno

12 February 1967 20	Juventus	4–1	Fiorentina	Turin
	Del Sol 7'; Menichelli 34', 90'; De Paoli 54'	Report	80' Bertini	Stadium: Comunale; Referee: Fulvio Pieroni

19 February 1967 21	Brescia	1–1	Juventus	Brescia
	Troja 74'	Report	34' Zigoni	Stadium: Stadio Mario Rigamonti; Referee: Concetto Lo Bello

26 February 1967 22	Juventus	0–0	Torino	Turin
		Report		Stadium: Comunale; Referee: Antonio Sbardella

5 March 1967 23	Foggia	0–0	Juventus	Foggia
		Report		Stadium: Stadio Pino Zaccheria; Referee: Alessandro D'Agostini

12 March 1967 24	Juventus	2–1	SPAL	Turin
	Zigoni 23', 61'	Report	42' Reja	Stadium: Comunale; Referee: Mario Bernardis

19 March 1967 25	Cagliari	0–0	Juventus	Cagliari
		Report		Stadium: Stadio Amsicora; Referee: Fulvio Pieroni

2 April 1967 26	Juventus	2–0	Napoli	Turin
	Zigoni 52'; Salvadore 55'	Report		Stadium: Comunale; Referee: Francesco Francescon

9 April 1967 27	Juventus	2–0	Roma	Turin
	Menichelli 8'; Zigoni 43'	Report		Stadium: Comunale; Referee: Antonio Di Tonno

16 April 1967 28	Bologna	2–0	Juventus	Bologna
	Haller 4'; Turra 43'	Report		Stadium: Comunale; Referee: Fulvio Pieroni

23 April 1967 29	Juventus	2–1	Venezia	Turin
	G. Bercellino 81' (pen.) 83'	Report	30' Mencacci	Stadium: Comunale; Referee: Antonio Marengo

30 April 1967 30	Milan	3–1	Juventus	Milan
	Sormani 30'; Rosato 34'; Lodetti 63'	Report	25' Menichelli	Stadium: Stadio San Siro; Referee: Francesco Francescon

7 May 1967 31	Juventus	1–0	Inter	Turin
	Favalli 71'	Report		Stadium: Comunale; Referee: Concetto Lo Bello

14 May 1967 32	Mantova	1–1	Juventus	Mantua
	Spelta 65'	Report	3' Menichelli	Stadium: Stadio Danilo Martelli; Referee: Antonio Sbardella

21 May 1967 33	Lanerossi	0–1	Juventus	Vicenza
		Report	65' Menichelli	Stadium: Stadio Romeo Menti; Referee: Concetto Lo Bello

28 May 1967 34	Juventus	2–1	Lazio	Turin
	Bercellino 47'; Zigoni 72'	Report	87' (pen.) Di Pucchio	Stadium: Comunale; Referee: Fabio Monti

=== Coppa Italia ===
==== Second round ====
2 November 1966	Juventus	3–0	Arezzo	Turin
	Zigoni 11', 48'; Leoncini 75'			Stadium: Comunale; Referee: Antonio Marchiori

==== Eightfinals ====
1 March 1967	Juventus	5–2	Lanerossi	Turin
	De Paoli 2', 110'; Menichelli 52', 101'; Stacchini 98'		22' Da Silva; 72' Menti	Stadium: Comunale; Referee: Priamo Varazzani

==== Quarterfinals ====
4 June 1967 Quarti	Bologna	1–1 (4–5 p)	Juventus	Bologna
	Fogli 89'		5' Zigoni	Stadium: Stadio Comunale; Referee: Aurelio Angonese

==== Semifinals ====
7 June 1967	Juventus	1–2	Milan	Turin
	Del Sol 37'		9' Mora; 115' Amarildo	Stadium: Comunale; Referee: Antonio Di Tonno

=== Fairs Cup ===
==== First round ====
11 September 1966 1	(Greece) Aris	0–2	Juventus	Thessaloniki
			30' Del Sol; 52' Menichelli	Stadium: Kleanthis Vikelidis Stadium; Referee: (West Germany) Dussel

21 September 1966	Juventus	5–0	(Greece) Aris	Turin
	Menichelli 32'; Favalli 36', 87'; De Paoli 65'; Gori 81'			Stadium: Comunale; Referee: (Scotland) Peterson

==== Round of 32 ====
9 November 1966	Juventus	3–1	(Portugal) Vitoria Setubal	Turin
	Castano 72'; Favalli 75'; Del Sol 88'		10' Carlos Manuel	Stadium: Comunale; Referee: (France) Helies

30 November 1966	(Portugal) Vitoria Setubal	0–2	Juventus	Lisbon
			10' Gori; 51' De Paoli	Stadium: Estádio do Bonfim; Referee: (England) Dagnall

==== Eightfinals ====
8 February 1967	Juventus	3–0	(Scotland) Dundee United	Turin
	Cinesinho 27', 67'; Menichelli 66'			Stadium: Comunale; Referee: (Switzerland) Keller

8 March 1967	(Scotland) Dundee United	1–0	Juventus	Dundee
	Dossing 80'			Stadium: Tannadice Park; Referee: (Netherlands) Roomer

==== Quarterfinals ====
29 March 1967	Juventus	2–2	(Socialist Federal Republic of Yugoslavia) Dinamo Zagreb	Turin
	Zigoni 4'; Stacchini 77'		13', 69' Jukic	Stadium: Comunale; Referee: (Switzerland) Heymann

19 April 1967	(Socialist Federal Republic of Yugoslavia) Dinamo Zagreb	3–0	Juventus	Zagreb
	Novak 4'; Mesic 67'; Belin 73'			Stadium: Stadio Maksimir; Referee: (Austria) Schiller

=== Statistics ===
==== Goalscorers ====
16 goals

- (Italy) Giampaolo Menichelli

13 goals

- (Italy) Virginio De Paoli

12 goals

- (Italy) Gianfranco Zigoni

5 goals

- (Italy) Erminio Favalli

4 goals

- (Italy) Giancarlo Bercellino
- (Spain) Luis del Sol
- (Italy) Gianfranco Leoncini
- (Italy) Sandro Salvadore

3 goals

- (Brazil) Chinesinho

2 goals

- (Italy) Adolfo Gori
- (Italy) Gino Stacchini

1 goal

- (Italy) Ernesto Càstano

== See also ==
Juventus FC
