= 1961–62 Juventus FC season =

Italian football club season

Juventus Football Club
1961–62 season
- Owner: Agnelli family
- President: Umberto Agnelli
- Manager: Carlo Parola
- Stadium: Stadio Comunale
- Serie A: 13th
- Coppa Italia: Semi-finals
- European Cup: Semi-finals
- Top goalscorer: Sívori (15)
Home colours	Away colours	Third colours

During the 1961–62 season Juventus Football Club competed in Serie A, the Coppa Italia and the European Cup.

== Summary ==
During summer club legend Forward Giampiero Boniperti is retired after 15 seasons, also, Head coach Renato Cesarini left the club, and Agnelli appointed Carlo Parola as manager.

Since 22 January 1961 President Agnelli had appointed Gunnar Gren as technical director, and during summer the Swedish is handling the first training sessions just until 7 September 1961, when he returned to Sweden due to family issues. Then, Agnelli appointed his replacement Július Korostelev as new technical director.

On 12 December 1961 Omar Sivori received the Ballon d'Or, meanwhile John Charles finished at 8th place.

After a disastrous league season, on 23 May 1962 head coach Carlo Parola is injured and replaced by Július Korostelev.

Meanwhile, in the European Cup the squad reached the semifinals for the first time ever against Real Madrid even with a won match at Santiago Bernabéu thanks to a goal of Sívori being the first defeat ever as local for the Spanish club in the Continental tournament since 1955. in front of a massive 130,000 attendance. However, the team lost the tie-breaker match 3 – 1 at Parc des Princes a week later.

Also, the squad was eliminated in semifinals of Coppa by SPAL with a 1–4 score.

At the end of the season, Welsh Forward John Charles left the club and he was transferred out to Leeds United.

The aftermath of the Trio magique was a difficult time for the Juventus fans despite Omar Sívori scored 15 goals during the campaign which saw the club finishing in a chaotic 12th spot in Serie A.

== Squad ==
Note: Flags indicate national team as defined under FIFA eligibility rules; some limited exceptions apply. Players may hold more than one non-FIFA nationality.

Pos.	Nation	Player
GK	ITA	Roberto Anzolin
GK	ITA	Giuseppe Gaspari
DF	ITA	Ernesto Càstano
DF	ITA	Gianfranco Leoncini
DF	ITA	Benito Sarti
DF	ITA	Bruno Garzena
DF	ITA	Giancarlo Bercellino
DF	ITA	Gianfranco Bozzao
DF	ITA	Domenico Casati
MF	ITA	Flavio Emoli (Captain)
MF	ITA	Bruno Mazzia
MF	ITA	Bruno Mora

Pos.	Nation	Player
FW	ITA	Bruno Nicolè
MF	ITA	Gino Stacchini
MF	ITA	Giorgio Stivanello
MF	ARG	Humberto Jorge Rosa
MF	ITA	Giorgio Rossano
MF	ITA	Antonio Montico
MF	ITA	Franco Carrera
FW	WAL	John Charles
FW	ARG	Omar Sívori
FW	ITA	Angelo Caroli
FW	ITA	Gianfranco Zigoni
MF	BRA	José Ferdinando Puglia

=== Transfers ===
In
Pos.	Name	from	Type
GK	Roberto Anzolin	Palermo	
GK	Giuseppe Gaspari	Catania	
DF	Bruno Garzena	Lanerossi Vicenza	
DF	Giancarlo Bercellino	Alessandria	
DF	Gianfranco Bozzao	SPAL	
DF	Domenico Casati		
MF	Humberto Jorge Rosa	Padova	
MF	Giorgio Rossano	AS Bari	loan
MF	Antonio Montico	AS Bari	loan
MF	José Ferdinando Puglia		
FW	Gianfranco Zigoni		

Out
Pos.	Name	To	Type
FW	Giampiero Boniperti		retired
GK	Carlo Mattrel	Palermo	loan
GK	Giuseppe Vavassori	Catania	
DF	Guglielmo Burelli	Udinese	
DF	Tarcisio Burgnich	Palermo	
DF	Sergio Cervato	SPAL	
MF	Umberto Colombo	Atalanta	
MF	Eugenio Fascetti	Messina	
MF	Severino Loiodice	Brescia	
GK	Gianni Romano	Udinese	

== Competitions ==
=== Serie A ===
==== League table ====
Pos	Team	Pld	W	D	L	GF	GA	GD	Pts
10	Catania	34	9	12	13	30	45	−15	30
12	Venezia	34	8	13	13	35	41	−6	29
12	Juventus	34	10	9	15	48	56	−8	29
14	Vicenza	34	8	11	15	29	43	−14	27
14	SPAL	34	9	9	16	30	50	−20	27

Source: Panini

==== Results by round ====
Round	1	2	3	4	5	6	7	8	9	10	11	12	13	14	15	16	17	18	19	20	21	22	23	24	25	26	27	28	29	30	31	32	33	34	35
Ground	A	H	A	H	A	H	A	H	H	A	H	H	A	A	H	A	H	H	A	H	A	H	A	H	H	A	H	A	A	H	H	A	H	A	A
Result	D	L	D	L	W	W	L	W	D	L	D	L	D	W	W	L	W	-	W	W	D	D	D	W	W	L	L	D	L	L	L	L	L	L	L
Position	7	12	12	15	11	9	11	11	10	10	10	12	13	11	9	11	9	10	9	9	7	7	8	8	6	7	7	8	9	9	9	10	10	10	12

Source: http://calcio-seriea.net/allenatori_squadra/1960/501/
A = Away; H = Home; W = Win; D = Draw; L = Loss; = Leader, European Cup; = Invited to 1961–62 Inter-Cities Fairs Cup; = Relegation to 1961–62 Serie B

==== Matches ====
27 August 1961 1	Juventus	1–1	Mantova 1911	Turin
16:30 CET	Charles 26'		52'Allemann	Stadium: Comunale; Referee: Sebastio

3 September 1961 2	Padova	2–1	Juventus	Padova
16:30 CET	Kölbl 4', 27'		78' Sívori	Stadium: Silvio Appiani; Referee: Adami

10 September 1961 3	Juventus	2–2	Lecco	Turin
16:00 CET	Mora 22' (pen.); Sívori 53'		52' Di Giacomo; 87' Cardarelli	Stadium: Comunale; Referee: Angonese

13 September 1961 4	Atalanta	3–1	Juventus	Bergamo
15:30 CET	Olivieri 24', 83'; Garzena 74' (o.g.)		63' Charles	Stadium: Comunale; Referee: Jonni

17 September 1961 5	Juventus	1–0	AS Roma	Turin
15:30 CET	14' Sívori			Stadium: Comunale; Referee: Rigato

24 September 1961 6	SPAL	0–3	Juventus	Ferrara
15:45 CET			41' Charles; 49' Stacchini; 90' Sívori	Stadium: Comunale; Referee: Genel

1 October 1961 7	Juventus	0–1	Torino	Turin
15:30 CET			69' Baker	Stadium: Comunale; Referee: Gambarotta

4 October 1961 8	Juventus	1–0	Catania	Turin
19:00 CET	Sívori 71'			Stadium: Comunale; Referee: Francescon

8 October 1961 9	Palermo	0–0	Juventus	Palermo
15:00 CET				Stadium: La Favorita; Referee: Rigato

22 October 1961 10	Juventus	2–4	Inter	Turin
14:45 CET	Charles 19'; Nicolè 68'		15' Hitchens; 58' (pen.) Suárez; 74', 87' Bettini	Stadium: Comunale; Referee: Lo Bello

29 October 1961 11	Bologna	2–2	Juventus	Bologna
14:30 CET	Perani 47' (pen.), 58'		6' Sívori; 24'Leoncini	Stadium: Comunale; Referee: Jonni

12 November 1961 12	AC Milan	5–1	Juventus	Milan
14:30 CET	Altafini 3', 8', 76', 78'; Rivera 63'		38' Rosa	Stadium: San Siro; Referee: Rigato

19 November 1961 13	Juventus	0–0	Fiorentina	Turin
14:30 CET				Stadium: Comunale; Referee: Genel

26 November 1961 14	Sampdoria	2–3	Juventus	Genoa
14:30 CET	Cucchiaroni 15'; Vincenzi 88' (pen.)		2', 4', 43' (pen.) Mora	Stadium: Luigi Ferraris; Referee: Angelini

3 December 1961 15	Juventus	2–0	Lanerossi Vicenza	Turin
14:30 CET	Sívori 30', 72'			Stadium: Comunale; Referee: Cataldo

10 December 1961 16	Udinese	2–1	Juventus	Udine
14:30 CET	Canella 42', 67'		5' Nicolè	Stadium: Moretti; Referee: Adami

17 December 1961 17	Juventus	1–0	Venezia	Turin
14:30 CET	Sívori 66'			Stadium: Comunale; Referee: Marchese

24 December 1961 18	Mantova 1911	suspd.	Juventus	Mantua
14:30 CET				Stadium: Danilo Martelli; Referee: Giorgio Genel
Note: Match suspended due to field issues.

10 January 1962 18	Mantova 1911	0–1	Juventus	Mantua
14:30 CET			3' Emoli	Stadium: Danilo Martelli; Referee: Adami
Note: Match rescheduled from 24 December 1961.

31 dicembre 1961 19	Juventus	4–0	Padova	Turin
14:30 CET	Stacchini 31'; Nicolè 35'; Sívori 42'; Cervato 57' (o.g.)			Stadium: Comunale; Referee: Sbardella

7 January 1962 20	Lecco	2–2	Juventus	Lecco
14:30 CET	Di Giacomo 42'; Duzioni 85'		25' Mazzia; 32' Nicolè	Stadium: Marion Rigamonti; Referee: Genel

14 January 1962 21	Juventus	1–1	Atalanta	Turin
14:30 CET	Nicolè 77'		78' Maschio	Stadium: Comunale; Referee: De Robbio

21 January 1962 22	AS Roma	3–3	Juventus	Rome
14:30 CET	Menichelli 21'; Jonsson 40'; Lojacono 74'		24'Rosa; 29'Nicolè; 71'Sívori	Stadium: Olimpico; Referee: Francescon

28 January 1962 23	Juventus	2–1	SPAL	Turin
14:30 CET	Stacchini 38'; Sívori 61'		71' (pen.) Cervato	Stadium: Comunale; Attendance: 7 000; Referee: Campanati

4 February 1962 24	Torino	1–3	Juventus	Turin
14:30 CET	Mazzia 46' (o.g.)		41', 71' Nicolè; 64' Charles	Stadium: Comunale; Referee: Jonni

11 February 1962 25	Catania	2–0	Juventus	Catania
15:00 CET	Szymaniak 47'; Ferrigno 84'			Stadium: Cibali; Referee: Rigato

18 February 1962 26	Juventus	2–4	Palermo	Turin
15:00 CET	Ferrazzi 21' (o.g.); Charles 48'		11' Prato; 68', 77' Fernando; 82' Burgnich	Stadium: Comunale; Referee: Samani

25 February 1962 27	Inter	2–2	Juventus	Milan
15:00 CET	Bicicli 13'; Hitchens 74'		79' Sívori; 87' Stacchini	Stadium: San Siro; Referee: Jonni

4 March 1962 28	Juventus	2–3	Bologna	Turin
15:00 CET	Leoncini 72'; Mazzia 83'		12', 52' Nielsen; 42' Perani	Stadium: Comunale; Referee: De Robbio

11 March 1962 29	Juventus	2–4	AC Milan	Turin
15:00 CET	Charles 42'; Mora 80' (pen.)		9' Barison; 49' Sani; 53', 67' Altafini	Stadium: Comunale; Referee: Rigato

18 March 1962 30	Fiorentina	1–0	Juventus	Florence
15:30 CET	Dell'Angelo 79'			Stadium: Comunale; Referee: Adami

25 March 1962 31	Juventus	0–1	Sampdoria	Turin
15:30			14' Brighenti	Stadium: Comunale; Referee: Grignani

1 April 1962 32	Lanerossi Vicenza	1–0	Juventus	Vicenza
15:30 CET	Vastola 64'			Stadium: Romeo Menti; Referee: Jonni

8 April 1962 33	Juventus	2–3	Udinese	Turin
15:30 CET	Stacchini 34'; Charles 35'		10' Selmosson; 20' Delpin; 76' Rozzoni	Stadium: Comunale; Referee: Varazzani

15 April 1962 34	Venezia	3–0	Juventus	Venice
15:30 CET	60' Siciliano; 68' Rossi; 70' Santon			Stadium: Pier Luigi Penzo; Referee: De Robbio

=== Coppa Italia ===
15 October 1961 Second round	Prato	2–3	Juventus	Prato
14:30 CET	Taccola 39'; Rossi 87'		10' Stacchini; 70' (pen.) Rossano; 84' Rosa	Stadium: Lungobisenzio; Referee: Roversi

25 April 1962 Third round	Brescia	0–1	Juventus	Brescia
15:30 CET			28' Charles	Stadium: Mario Rigamonti; Referee: Sbardella

30 April 1962 Quarterfinals	Juventus	3–0	Lecco	Turin
21:00 CET	Nicolè 43'; Charles 46'; Stacchini 77'			Stadium: Filadelfia; Attendance: 4 000; Referee: Adami

31 May 1962 Semifinals	SPAL	4–1	Juventus	Ferrara
17:00 CET	Micheli 31'; Dell'Omodarme 33', 69'; Cervato 72' (pen.)		79' (o.g.) Muccini	Stadium: Comunale

21 June 1962 Third place	Mantova 1911	1–0	Juventus	Mantua
21:00 CET	Mazzero 53' (pen.)			Stadium: Danilo Martelli; Attendance: 12 000; Referee: Rigato

=== European Cup ===
==== Preliminary Round ====
20 September 1961	Panathinaikos (Greece)	1–1	(Italy) Juventus	Athens
15:30 CET	Papaemmanouīl 64'		42' Mora	Stadium: Alexandras; Attendance: 23 904; Referee: (Czechoslovakia) Galba

27 September 1961	Juventus (Italy)	2–1	(Greece) Panathinaikos	Turin
21:30 CET	Nicolè 20'; Rossano 25'		62' (pen.) Cholevas	Stadium: Comunale; Attendance: 19 452; Referee: (Czechoslovakia) Obtulovič

==== First round ====
8 November 1961	Partizan (Socialist Federal Republic of Yugoslavia)	1–2	(Italy) Juventus	Belgrado
14:15 CET	76'Vasović Gol ’		35' Nicolè 73' Rosa	Stadium: Narodna Armija; Attendance: 23 472; Referee: (Switzerland) Schiker

15 November 1961	Juventus (Italy)	5–0	(Socialist Federal Republic of Yugoslavia) Partizan	Turin
15:00 CET	Nicolè 1'; Mora 36', 61'; Rosa 55'; Stacchini 67'			Stadium: Comunale; Attendance: 14 347; Referee: (Switzerland)

==== Quarterfinals ====
14 February 1962	Juventus (Italy)	0–1	(Spain) Real Madrid	Turin
15:30 CET			69' Di Stéfano	Stadium: Comunale; Attendance: 66 403; Referee: (West Germany) Dusch

21 February 1962	Real Madrid (Spain)	0–1	(Italy) Juventus	Madrid
20:30			38' Sívori	Stadium: Santiago Bernabeu; Attendance: 100 000; Referee: (France) Guigue

===== Tie-breaker =====
28 February 1962	Real Madrid (Spain)	3–1	(Italy) Juventus	Paris
20:30 CET	Felo 1'; Del Sol 65'; Tejada 82'		33' Sivori	Stadium: Parc des Princes; Attendance: 36 750; Referee: (France) Schwinté

== Statistics ==
=== Players statistics ===
No.	Pos	Nat	Player	Total		1961-62 Serie A	
No.	Pos	Nat	Player	Apps	Goals	Apps	Goals
	GK	(Italy) ITA	Roberto Anzolin	30	-45	30	-45
	DF	(Italy) ITA	Gianfranco Leoncini	29	2	29	2
	DF	(Italy) ITA	Benito Sarti	27	0	27	0
	DF	(Italy) ITA	Bruno Garzena	26	0	26	0
	MF	(Italy) ITA	Flavio Emoli	29	1	29	1
	MF	(Italy) ITA	Bruno Mazzia	22	2	22	2
	MF	(Italy) ITA	Bruno Mora	26	5	26	5
	MF	(Italy) ITA	Gino Stacchini	26	5	26	5
	FW	(Italy) ITA	Bruno Nicolè	27	8	27	8
	FW	(Wales) WAL	John Charles	21	8	21	8
	FW	(Argentina) ARG	Omar Sívori	25	13	25	13
	GK	(Italy) ITA	Giuseppe Gaspari	4	-11	4	-11
	DF	(Italy) ITA	Giancarlo Bercellino	21	0	21	0
	MF	(Argentina) ARG	Humberto Jorge Rosa	18	2	18	2
	DF	(Italy) ITA	Ernesto Càstano	16	0	16	0
	MF	(Italy) ITA	Giorgio Rossano	10	0	10	0
	DF	(Italy) ITA	Gianfranco Bozzao	7	0	7	0
	MF	(Italy) ITA	Giorgio Stivanello	3	0	3	0
	DF	(Italy) ITA	Domenico Casati	2	0	2	0
	MF	(Italy) ITA	Antonio Montico	2	0	2	0
	FW	(Italy) ITA	Angelo Caroli	2	0	2	0
	FW	(Italy) ITA	Gianfranco Zigoni	1	0	1	0
	MF	(Brazil) BRA	José Ferdinando Puglia				

- Source: http://calcio-seriea.net/presenze/1961/524/
