= 1968 Cup of the Alps =

1968 Coppa delle Alpi
Alpencup, Coupe des Alpes

Tournament details
- Country: Switzerland and Germany
- Teams: 12

Final positions
- Champions: FC Schalke 04
- Runners-up: FC Basel

Tournament statistics
- Matches played: 31
- Goals scored: 109 (3.52 per match)

1968 Coppa delle Alpi shows the results of the 1968 tournament that was held mainly in Switzerland in the preseason 1968/69. The Coppa delle Alpi (translated as Cup of the Alps) was a football tournament, jointly organized by the Italian national league and the Swiss League as a pre-season event.

Most of the games in the 1968 competition were played in Switzerland. There were four teams taking part from Italy A.S. Roma, ACF Fiorentina, Cagliari and Juventus, four from Germany 1. FC Kaiserslautern, 1. FC Köln, Eintracht Frankfurt and FC Schalke 04 as well as four from Switzerland Luzern, Servette FC Genève, Young Boys and FC Basel. The teams were drawn into two groups, two teams from each country in either group. The winners of the two groups were matched in the final.

== Group A ==
=== Matches ===
Round 1

16 June 1968

Roma (Italy)	1 – 0	(Italy) Fiorentina
Taccola 63'

Rosenaustadion, Augsburg
Attendance: 3,500
Referee: (Germany) Tschentcher

16 June 1968

Basel (Switzerland)	1 – 1	(Switzerland) Servette
Goal		Goal

St. Jakob Stadium, Basel

16 June 1968

Kaiserslautern (Germany)	1 – 0	(Germany) Köln
Goal

Round 2

18 June 1968
21:00

FC Basel (Switzerland)	2 – 2	(Italy) A.S. Roma
Fischli 6'; Demarmels 18'		49' Taccola; 85' Jair

St. Jakob Stadium, Basel
Referee: (Germany) Ott

18 June 1968

Kaiserslautern (Germany)	2 – 2	(Italy) Fiorentina
Goal		Goal

18 June 1968

Servette (Switzerland)	1 – 1	(Germany) Köln
Goal		Goal

Round 3

Match day 3

FC Basel (Switzerland)	1 – 0	(Germany) 1. FC Kaiserslautern
Goal

St. Jakob Stadium Basel

Match day 3

Fiorentina (Italy)	1 – 0	(Germany) Köln
Goal

23 June 1968

Servette (Switzerland)	2 – 3	(Italy) A.S. Roma
Blanchard 52'; Sirena 82' (o.g.)		16' Taccola; 41', 65' Enzo

Charmilles Stadium, Geneva
Referee: (Germany) Siebert

Round 4

Match day 4

FC Basel (Switzerland)	3 – 2	(Germany) 1. FC Köln
Goal		Goal

St. Jakob Stadium Basel

Match day 4

Servette (Switzerland)	1 – 4	(Italy) Fiorentina
Goal		Goal

Match day 4

1. FC Kaiserslautern (Germany)	3 – 0	(Italy) A.S. Roma
Goal

Round 5

Match day 5

A.S. Roma (Italy)	2 – 0	(Germany) 1. FC Köln
Goal

Match day 5

Servette (Switzerland)	1 – 0	(Germany) 1. FC Kaiserslautern
Goal

Match day 5

FC Basel (Switzerland)	1 – 1	(Italy) Fiorentina
Goal		Goal

St. Jakob Stadium Basel

=== Table ===
Pos	Team	Pld	W	D	L	GF	GA	Pts
1	FC Basel	5	2	3	0	8	6	7
2	A.S. Roma	5	2	2	1	8	7	6
3	Fiorentina	5	2	2	1	8	5	6
4	1. FC Kaiserslautern	5	2	1	2	6	4	5
5	Servette FC Genève	5	1	2	2	6	9	4
6	1. FC Köln	5	0	1	4	3	8	2

== Group B ==
=== Matches ===
Round 1

15 June 1968

Cagliari (Italy)	1 – 0	(Italy) Juventus
Cera 43'	Summary Juventus

St. Jakob Stadium, Basel
Referee: (Switzerland) Anton Bucheli

16 June 1968

Young Boys (Switzerland)	3 – 2	(Switzerland) Luzern
Goal		Goal

14 June 1968

Eintracht Frankfurt (Germany)	1 – 1	(Germany) FC Schalke 04
Solz 38'	(Report Eintracht Frankfurt)	Słomiany 13'

Wiesbaden
Attendance: 6,000
Referee: (Germany) Helmut Fritz

Round 2

18 June 1968

Young Boys (Switzerland)	2 – 2	(Germany) Eintracht Frankfurt
Grosser 35', 74'	(Report Eintracht Frankfurt)	Lotz 15'; Schämer 86'

Attendance: 2,918
Referee: (Italy) Francescon

18 June 1968

Luzern (Switzerland)	1 – 4	(Italy) Cagliari
Goal		Goal

18 June 1968
19:30

FC Schalke 04 (Germany)	3 – 1	(Italy) Juventus
Pohlschmidt 16'; Wittkamp 30'; Hans-Jürgen Becher 88'	Summary Juventus	71' Leoncini

Glückauf-Kampfbahn, Gelsenkirchen
Referee: (Switzerland) Joseph Heymann

Round 3

23 June 1968

Eintracht Frankfurt (Germany)	2 – 1	(Italy) Juventus
Blusch 52', 61'	Summary Juventus	49' De Paoli

Waldstadion, Frankfurt
Attendance: 10,000
Referee: (Switzerland) Schneuwly

Match day 3

Young Boys (Switzerland)	2 – 3	(Italy) Cagliari
Goal		Goal

Match day 3

Luzern (Switzerland)	0 – 4	(Germany) FC Schalke 04
		Goal

Round 4

25 June 1968

Young Boys (Switzerland)	3 – 1	(Italy) Juventus
Allemann 28'; Guggisberg 34', 70'	Summary Juventus	90' (pen.) Zigoni

Wankdorf Stadium, Bern
Referee: (Germany) Rudolf Kreitlein

25 June 1968
Match day 4

Luzern (Switzerland)	4 – 9	(Germany) Eintracht Frankfurt
Richter 9', 61'; Meier 24'; Flury 25'	(Report Eintracht Frankfurt)	Lothar Schämer 50'; Abbé 53', 65', 85'; Huberts 71', 89'; Friedrich 72', 80'; Lotz 73'

Attendance: 4,000

Match day 4

FC Schalke 04 (Germany)	2 – 2	(Italy) Cagliari
Goal		Goal

Round 5

Match day 5

Young Boys (Switzerland)	0 – 3	(Germany) FC Schalke 04
		Goal

29 June 1968

Luzern (Switzerland)	2 – 5	(Italy) Juventus
Richter 32'; Trivellin 86'	Summary Juventus	31' Sacco; 64' (pen.) Zigoni; 71' Menichelli; 80' Gori; 84' Favalli

Stadion Allmend, Luzern
Referee: (Germany) Heinz Siebert

29 June 1968
Match day 5

Eintracht Frankfurt (Germany)	2 – 2	(Italy) Cagliari
Grabowski; Huberts	(Report Eintracht Frankfurt)	Goal

Attendance: 12,000

=== Table ===
Pos	Team	Pld	W	D	L	GF	GA	Pts
1	FC Schalke 04	5	3	2	0	13	4	8
2	Cagliari	5	3	2	0	12	7	8
3	Eintracht Frankfurt	5	2	3	0	16	10	7
4	Young Boys	5	2	1	2	10	11	5
5	Juventus	5	1	0	4	8	11	2
6	Luzern	5	0	0	5	9	23	0

== Final ==
2 July 1968
Final

FC Basel (Switzerland)	1 – 3 (a.e.t.)	(Germany) FC Schalke 04
Helmut Hauser 40'	Report FC Schalke 04	8', 95', 103' Michel

St. Jakob Stadium Basel
Attendance: 13,000
Referee: (Italy) Mario Carminati

== Sources and References ==
- Cup of the Alps 1968 at RSSSF
- Coppa delle Alpi 1968 at myjuve.it
