= Rinero =

Rinero is a surname. Notable people with the surname include:

- Christophe Rinero (born 1973), French cyclist
- Elio Rinero (born 1947), Italian footballer

== See also ==
- Rionero (disambiguation)
