= 1961–62 Udinese Calcio season =

Udinese Calcio
1961–62 season
- Manager: Luigi Bonizzoni; Sergio Manente; Antonio Foni
- Stadium: Stadio Moretti
- Serie A: 18th
- Coppa Italia: Second Round

During the 1961–62 Italian football season, Udinese Calcio competed in the Serie A. Udinese finished 18th in the league standings and were relegated.

== Squad ==
=== Goalkeepers ===
- (Italy) Gianni Romano
- (Italy) Franco Dinelli
- (Italy) Dino Zoff

=== Defenders ===
- (Italy) Guglielmo Burelli
- (Italy) Renato Valenti
- (Italy) Remo Barbiani
- (Italy) Claudio Pribaz
- (Italy) Flavio Colaotto
- (Italy) Silvio Bernard

=== Midfielders ===
- (Italy) Vasco Tagliavini
- (Italy) Armando Segato
- (Italy) Candido Beretta
- (Italy) Renzo Sassi
- (Italy) Giuseppe Del Zotto
- (Italy) Claudio Del Pin
- (Italy) Franco De Cecco
- (Italy) Elvio Salvori

=== Attackers ===
- (Italy) Francesco Canella
- (Argentina) Luis Pentrelli
- (Sweden) Arne Selmosson
- (Italy) Roberto Manganotto
- (Italy) Giulio Bonafin
- (Sweden) Kurt Andersson
- (Italy) Carlo Galli
- (Denmark) Leif Mortensen
- (Italy) Giorgio Tinazzi

== Serie A ==
=== League table ===
Pos	Team	Pld	W	D	L	GF	GA	GD	Pts	Qualification or relegation
14	Vicenza	34	8	11	15	29	43	−14	27	
14	SPAL	34	9	9	16	30	50	−20	27	
16	Padova (R)	34	7	9	18	29	49	−20	23	Relegated to Serie B
16	Lecco (R)	34	6	11	17	30	53	−23	23	Relegated to Serie B
18	Udinese (R)	34	6	5	23	37	63	−26	17	Relegated to Serie B

Source: Panini
(R) Relegated
