= Gaspari =

Gaspari is a surname. Notable people with the surname include:

- Annibale de Gasparis (1819–1892), Italian astronomer
- Diana Gaspari (born 1984), Italian curler
- Elio Gaspari (born 1944), Brazilian journalist and writer resident in São Paulo
- Fabio de Gaspari (born 1966), Italian javelin thrower
- Gaetano Gaspari (1807/8–1881), Italian composer, bibliographer, and historian of music
- Gianfranco Gaspari, Italian bobsledder who competed from the late 1960s to the early 1970s
- Giuseppe Gaspari (1932–2025), Italian football player
- Maksim Gaspari (1883–1980), Slovene painter
- Mario Pio Gaspari (1918–1983), Italian cardinal
- Mitja Gaspari (born 1951), Slovenian economist, banker, and politician
- Pietro Gaspari (1720–1785), Italian artist, known for veduta and capriccio in etchings and paintings
- Remo Gaspari (1921–2011), Italian politician, who was several times minister of the Italian Republic
- Rich Gaspari (born 1963), American professional bodybuilder from the 1980s and early 1990s

== See also ==
- 16973 Gaspari, main-belt asteroid
- 4279 De Gasparis, main-belt asteroid
- Alcide De Gasperi
