= Onor =

Onor may refer to:

- Önör, vizier of the Damascus Atabegate and governor of Baalbek
- Guido Onor, a soccer player
