= Beinasco =

Beinasco Beinasch (Piedmontese)
- Comune
- Comune di Beinasco
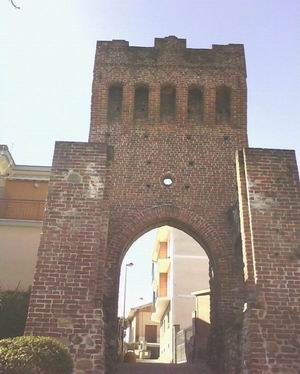

- Coat of arms

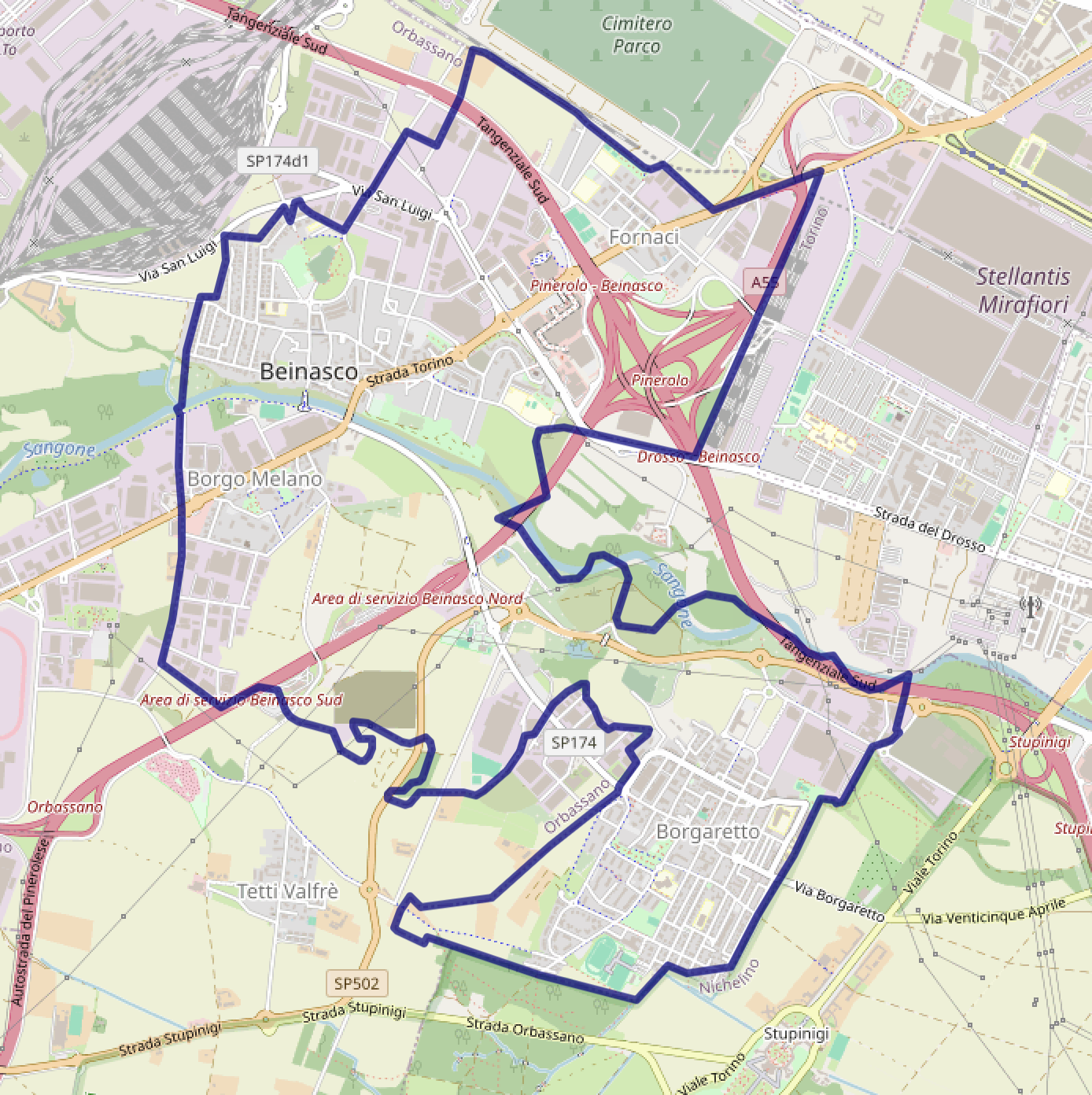
- OSM map of Beinasco.

- Location within Italy Location within Piedmont
- Coordinates: 45°1′N 7°35′E
- Country: Italy
- Region: Piedmont
- Metropolitan city: Turin (TO)
- Frazioni: Borgaretto, Fornaci, Borgo Melano

Government
  - Mayor: Maurizio Piazza

Area
  - Total: 6.73 km^{2} (2.60 sq mi)
- Elevation: 260 m (850 ft)

Population (30 November 2017)
  - Total: 18,024
  - Density: 2,680/km^{2} (6,940/sq mi)
- Demonym: Beinaschesei
- Time zone: UTC+1 (CET)
  - Summer (DST): UTC+2 (CEST)
- Postal code: 10092
- Dialing code: 011
- Website: Official website

Beinasco (Piedmontese: Beinasch [bei̯ˈnɑsk]) is a comune (municipality) in the Metropolitan City of Turin in the Italian region Piedmont, located about 11 km (7 mi) southwest of Turin.

== Twin towns ==
Beinasco is twinned with:

- Piatra Neamţ, Romania (2001)
- Manilva, Spain (2009)

== People ==
- Sebastian Giovinco, footballer
- Elio Rinero, footballer
- Elecktra Bionic, drag queen
