= Pietro Fioravanti =

Italian footballer (born 1946)

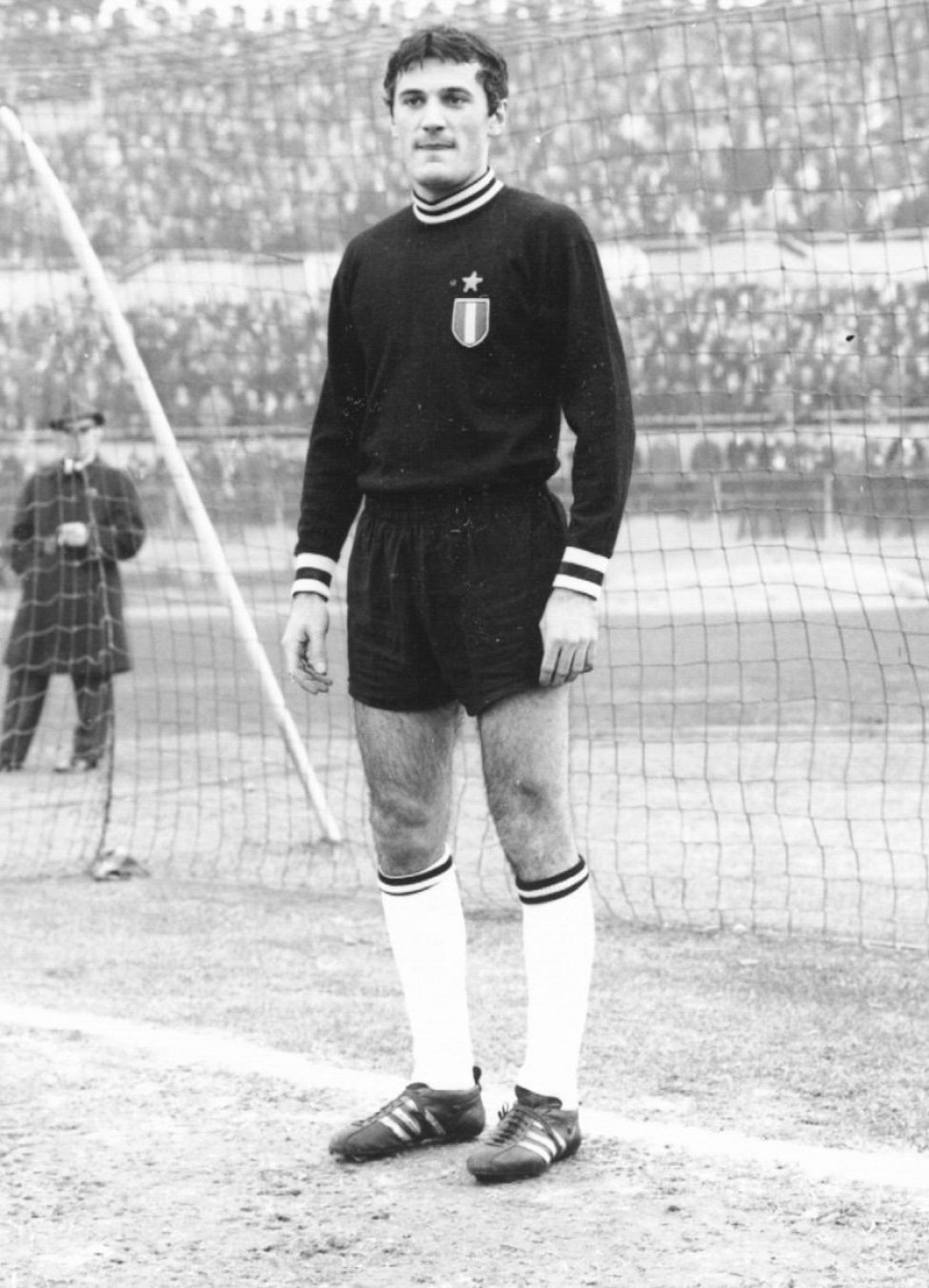
- Fioravanti with Juventus in the 1967–68 season

Personal information
- Date of birth: 4 April 1946 (age 80)
- Place of birth: Cesena, Italy
- Position: Goalkeeper

Senior career*
Years	Team	Apps	(Gls)
1962–1964	→ Cesena (loan)		
1964–1968	Juventus		
1968–1969	→ Lazio (loan)		
1969–1970	Juventus		
1970–1972	Piacenza		
1973–1974	→ Pescara (loan)		
1974–1975	Asti		
1975–1976	Riccione		
- * Club domestic league appearances and goals

Pietro Fioravanti (born 4 April 1946) is an Italian professional footballer who played as a goalkeeper.

== Honours ==
Juventus

- Serie A: 1966–67
