= Gianluigi Roveta =

Italian footballer

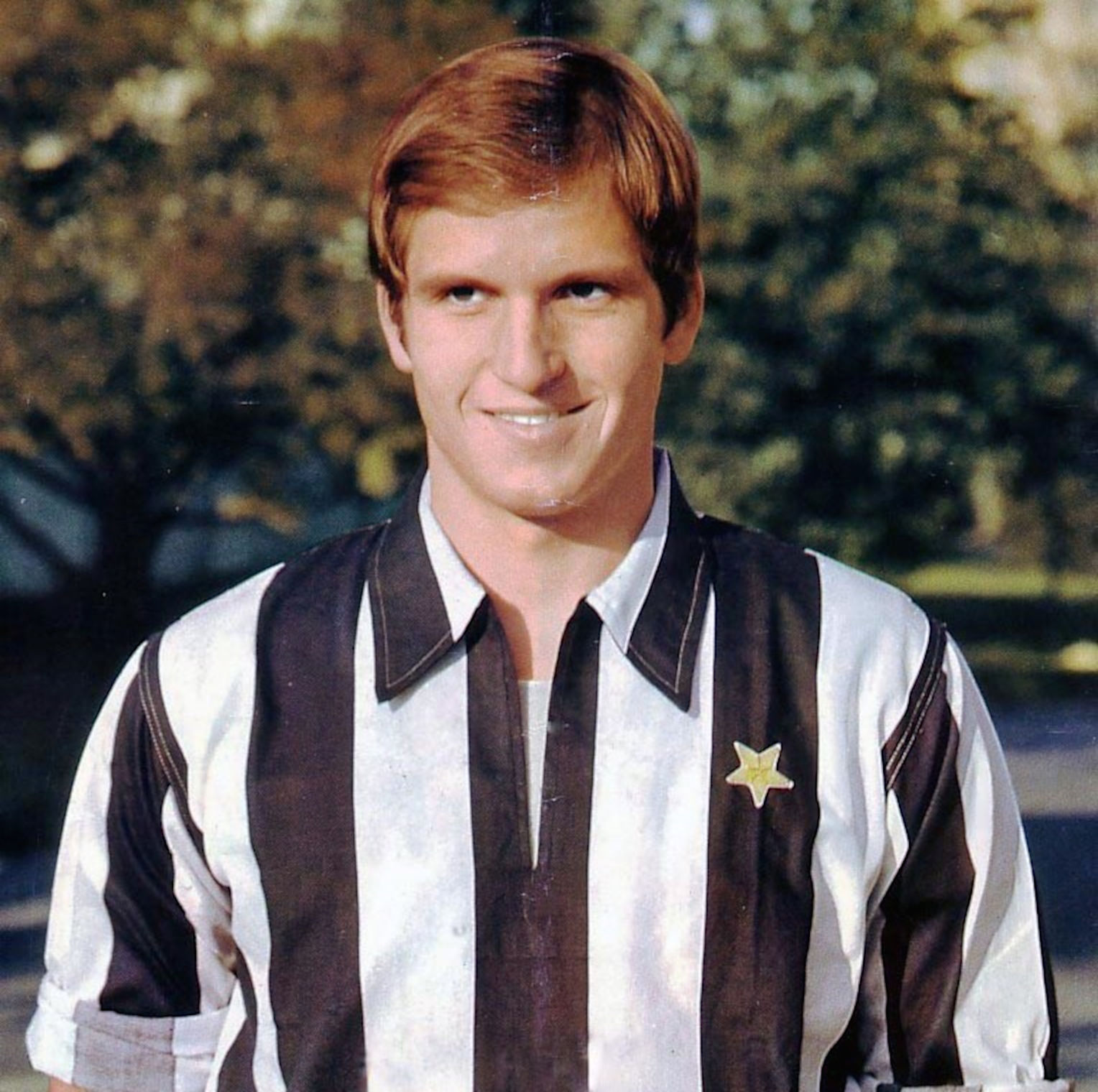
- Roveta with Juventus in 1969

Personal information
- Date of birth: 21 May 1947 (age 79)
- Place of birth: Turin, Italy
- Height: 1.80 m (5 ft 11 in)
- Position: Defender

Senior career*
| Years | Team | Apps | (Gls) |
| 1966–1972 | Juventus | 46 | (0) |
| 1972–1973 | Mantova | 34 | (0) |
| 1973–1974 | Novara | 14 | (0) |
- * Club domestic league appearances and goals

Gianluigi Roveta (born 21 May 1947 in Turin) is a retired Italian professional football player.

== Honours ==
- Serie A champion: 1971/72.
