= Bruno Garzena =

Italian footballer (1933–2024)

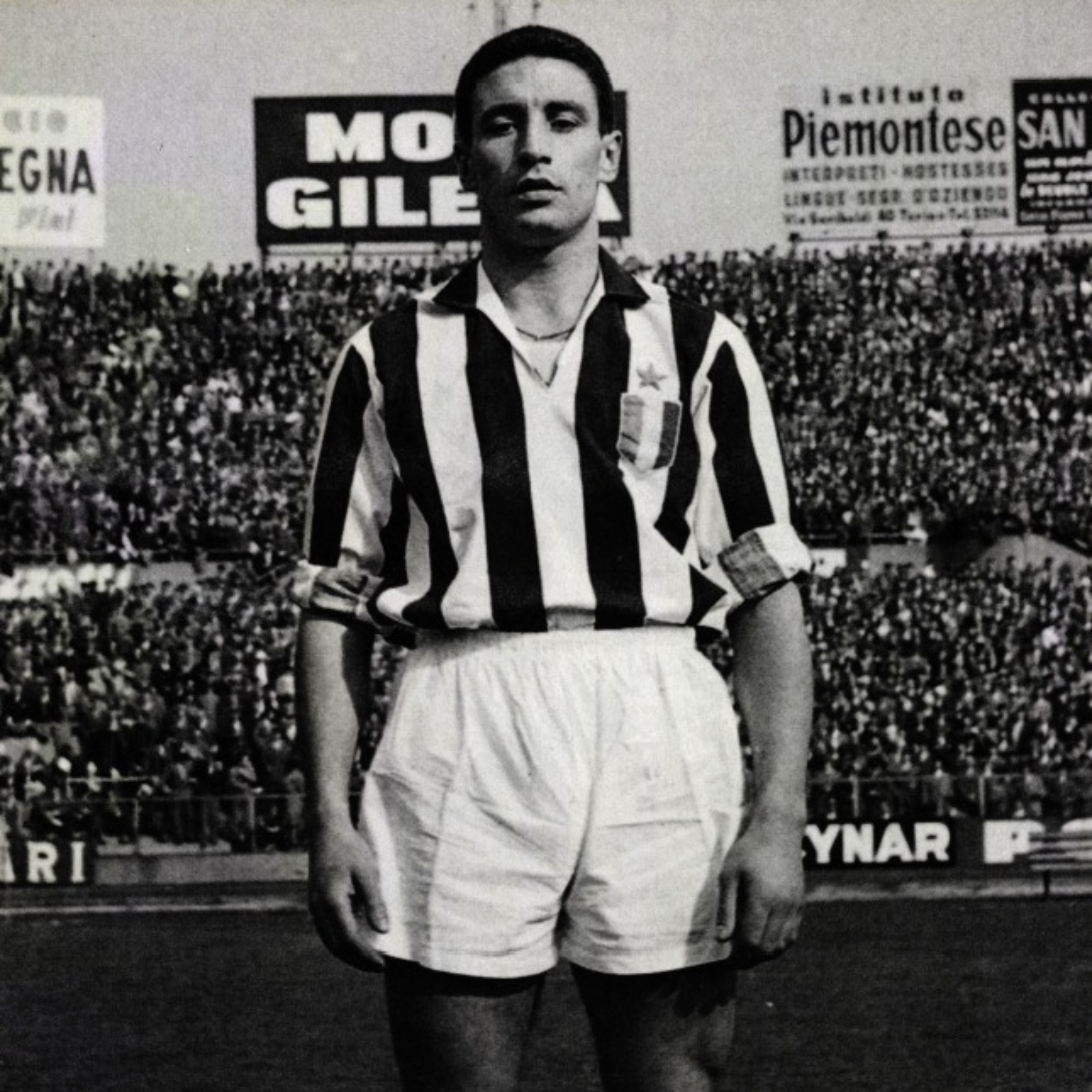
- Garzena with Juventus between 1950s and 1960s

Personal information
- Date of birth: 2 February 1933
- Place of birth: Venaria Reale, Italy
- Date of death: 30 July 2024 (aged 91)
- Place of death: Turin, Italy
- Height: 1.80 m (5 ft 11 in)
- Position: Defender

Senior career*
| Years | Team | Apps | (Gls) |
| 1952–1953 | Juventus | 1 | (0) |
| 1953–1954 | Alessandria | 34 | (0) |
| 1954–1962 | Juventus | 165 | (0) |
| 1960–1961 | → Lanerossi Vicenza (loan) | 31 | (1) |
| 1962–1963 | Modena | 20 | (0) |
| 1963–1964 | Napoli | 30 | (0) |
| 1964–1966 | Ivrea | 16 | (0) |

International career
| 1958 | Italy | 1 | (0) |
- * Club domestic league appearances and goals

Bruno Garzena (Italian pronunciation: [ˈbruːno ɡarˈdzeːna]; 2 February 1933 – 30 July 2024) was an Italian professional footballer who played as a defender. Garzena died in Turin on 30 July 2024, at the age of 91.

== Honours ==
Juventus

- Serie A: 1957–58, 1959–60
- Coppa Italia: 1958–59, 1959–60
