= Rionero =

Rionero may refer to the following comuni in southern Italy:

- Rionero Sannitico, in the province of Isernia
- Rionero in Vulture, in the province of Potenza
