= Humberto Rosa (footballer) =

Italian Argentine footballer and coach

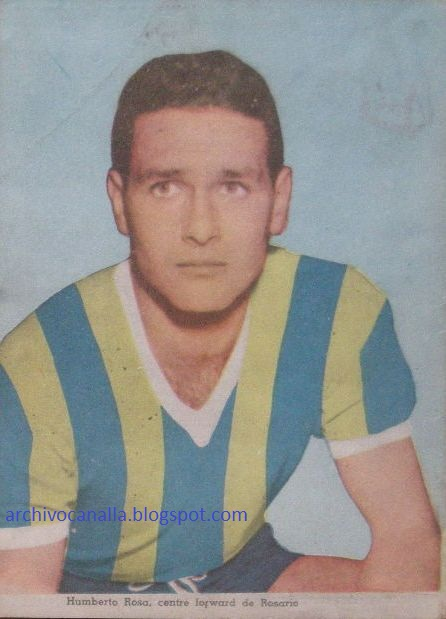

Personal information
- Full name: Humberto Jorge Rosa
- Date of birth: April 8, 1932
- Place of birth: Buenos Aires, Argentina
- Date of death: September 8, 2017 (aged 85)
- Place of death: Padua, Italy
- Height: 1.72 m (5 ft 7 1/2 in)
- Position: Midfielder

Senior career*
Years	Team	Apps	(Gls)
1950–1954	Rosario Central	88	(9)
1954–1956	Sampdoria	48	(10)
1956–1961	Padova	150	(16)
1961–1962	Juventus	18	(2)
1962–1964	Napoli	44	(4)

Managerial career
- 1966–1969: Padova
- 1975–1976: Udinese
- 1976–1977: Pro Patria
- 1978–1979: S.S.C. Venezia
- * Club domestic league appearances and goals

Humberto Jorge Rosa (April 8, 1932 – September 8, 2017) was an Argentine professional football player and coach. He also held Italian citizenship.
