= Carlo Volpi =

Italian footballer (born 1941)

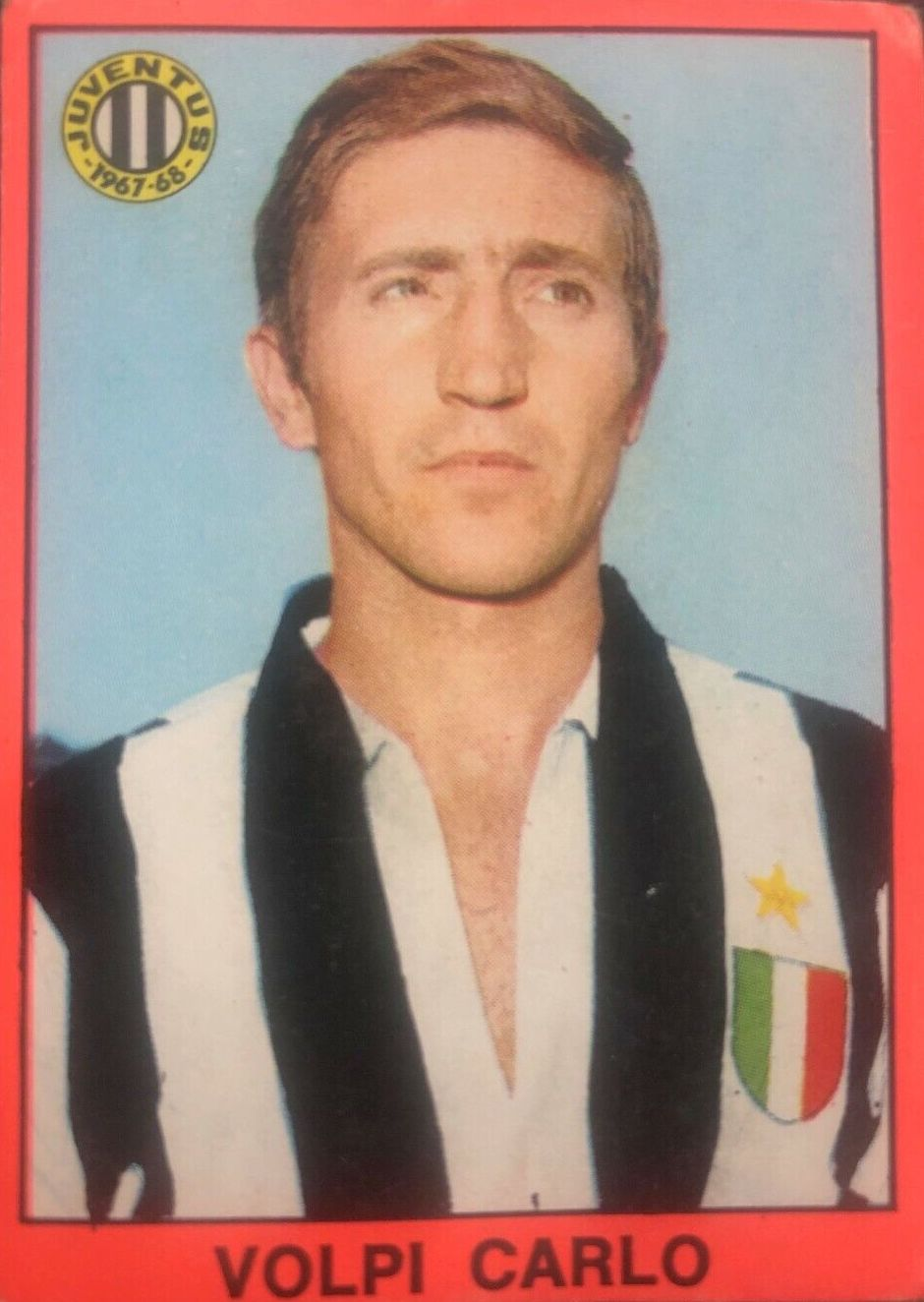

Personal information
- Date of birth: February 8, 1941 (age 85)
- Place of birth: Sampierdarena, Italy
- Height: 1.76 m (5 ft 9 1/2 in)
- Position: Midfielder

Senior career*
Years	Team	Apps	(Gls)
1958–1960	Monza	19	(4)
1960–1962	Reggiana	57	(20)
1962–1963	Palermo	29	(1)
1963–1967	Mantova	94	(6)
1967	Juventus	5	(0)
1967–1971	Brescia	101	(6)
1971–1972	Perugia	33	(1)
1972–1975	Parma	84	(15)
1975–1976	Lucchese	30	(2)
- * Club domestic league appearances and goals

Carlo Volpi (born February 8, 1941, in Sampierdarena) is an Italian former professional footballer.
