= Kurt Andersson =

Swedish footballer

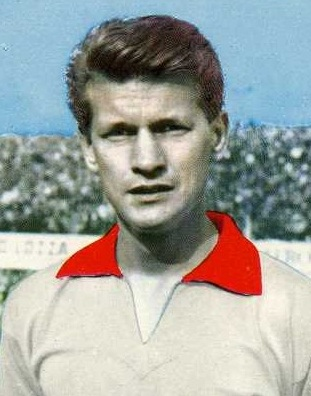
- Andersson in 1965

Personal information
- Date of birth: 24 April 1939 (age 87)
- Place of birth: Malmberget, Sweden
- Position: Forward

International career
Years	Team	Apps	(Gls)
1964	Sweden	1	(0)

Kurt Andersson (born 24 April 1939) is a Swedish footballer. He played in one match for the Sweden men's national football team in 1964.
