= Paolo Sirena =

Italian footballer (1945–2025)

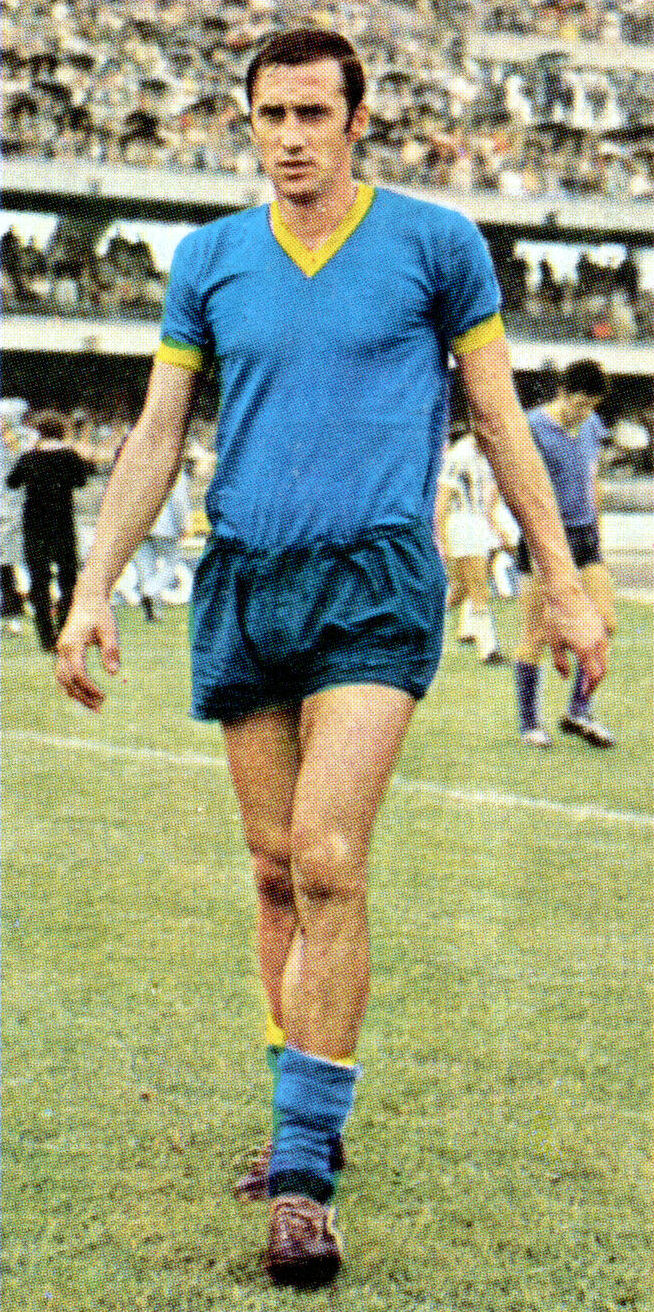
- Sirena with Verona in 1970

Personal information
- Date of birth: 11 September 1945
- Place of birth: Treviso, Italy
- Date of death: 27 June 2025 (aged 79)
- Height: 1.86 m (6 ft 1 in)
- Position: Defender

Senior career*
Years	Team	Apps	(Gls)
1962–1964	Treviso	23	(1)
1964–1966	Inter Milan	0	(0)
1966–1969	Roma	44	(4)
1969–1977	Verona	205	(14)
- * Club domestic league appearances and goals

Paolo Sirena (11 September 1945 – 27 June 2025) was an Italian professional footballer who played as a defender.

== Career ==
Sirena played for 10 seasons (216 games, 12 goals) in Serie A for Roma and Verona. His most memorable goal for Verona fans was a header in the 5–3 win over A.C. Milan on 20 May 1973.

== Personal life and death ==
His younger brother Alessandro Sirena also played football professionally. To distinguish them, Paolo was referred to as Sirena I and Alessandro as Sirena II.

After retirement Sirena worked as a lawyer.

Sirena died on 27 June 2025, at the age of 79.

== Honours ==
Roma

- Coppa Italia: 1968–69
