= Franco Carrera =

Italian footballer (1943–2026)

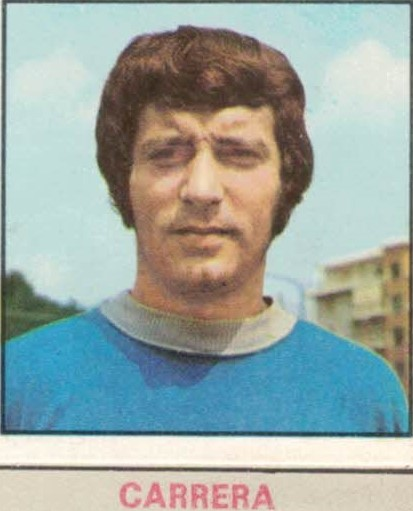

Personal information
- Date of birth: 8 November 1943
- Place of birth: Turin, Italy
- Date of death: 27 October 2026 (aged 82)
- Place of death: Belgirate, Italy
- Height: 1.75 m (5 ft 9 in)
- Position: Midfielder

Senior career*
Years	Team	Apps	(Gls)
1962–1963	Juventus	5	(0)
1963–1965	Potenza	61	(13)
1965–1966	SPAL	9	(0)
1966–1967	Potenza	35	(10)
1968	Foggia	5	(0)
1968–1969	Catania	16	(3)
1969–1975	Novara	194	(20)
1975–1976	Taranto	21	(0)
1976–1977	Parma	4	(0)
- * Club domestic league appearances and goals

Franco Carrera (8 November 1943 – 27 October 2026) was an Italian professional footballer who played as a midfielder.

Carrera began playing football with Juventus, and would make his Serie A debut with the club. However, he spent most of his career playing in Serie B.

After he retired from playing football, Carrera became a chef. He died on 27 October 2026, aged 82.
