= Antonio Montico =

Italian footballer and coach (1933–2013)

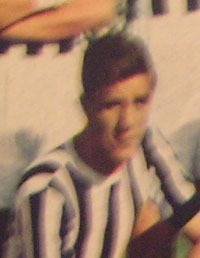

Personal information
- Date of birth: 30 December 1933
- Place of birth: Valvasone, Italy
- Date of death: 27 May 2013 (aged 79)
- Height: 1.82 m (5 ft 11 1/2 in)
- Position: Midfielder

Senior career*
Years	Team	Apps	(Gls)
1950–1951	Pro Gorizia		
1951–1953	Udinese	9	(3)
1953–1960	Juventus	105	(18)
1960–1961	Bari	9	(1)
1961–1962	Juventus	2	(0)
1962	Toronto Italia		
1962–1966	Anconitana	89	(0)

International career
1955	Italy	2	(0)

Managerial career
- 1976–1977: Pro Vercelli
- * Club domestic league appearances and goals

Antonio Montico (Italian pronunciation: [anˈtɔːnjo monˈtiːko]; 30 December 1933 – 27 May 2013) was an Italian professional football player and coach, who played as a midfielder.

== Career ==
Montico played club football for Juventus FCIn 1962, he played the remainder of the season in the Eastern Canada Professional Soccer League with Toronto Italia.

After he retired from playing, Montico became a football coach. He managed U.S. Pro Vercelli Calcio's youth and senior squads.

== Honours ==
Juventus

- Serie A champion: 1957–58, 1959–60.
- Coppa Italia winner: 1958–59, 1959–60.
