= Domenico Casati =

Italian footballer (born 1943)

Personal information
- Date of birth: 21 June 1943 (age 83)
- Place of birth: Treviglio, Italy
- Height: 1.76 m (5 ft 9 1/2 in)
- Position: Defender

Senior career*
Years	Team	Apps	(Gls)
1960–1961	Trevigliese	32	(0)
1961–1962	Juventus	2	(0)
1962–1965	Potenza	63	(2)
1965–1966	Atalanta	19	(0)
1966–1968	Brescia	41	(1)
1968–1970	Pisa	51	(1)
1970–1973	Perugia	103	(2)
1973–1974	Brescello	37	(0)
1974–1976	Brescia	43	(1)

Managerial career
- 1976–1982: Atalanta (youth)
- 1982–1984: Verona (primavera)
- 1984–1989: Napoli (assistant coach)
- 1990–1991: Roma (assistant coach)
- 1992–1994: Napoli (assistant coach)
- 1994–1995: Inter (assistant coach)
- 1998–2000: Torino (assistant coach)
- 2003–2004: Avelino (director)
- 2005–2006: Foggia (director)
- 2006–2007: AlbinoLeffe (assistant coach)
- 2009–2010: Cremonese (assistant coach)
- 2012–2013: Cremonese (director)
- 2014–2015: Feralpisalò (director)
- * Club domestic league appearances and goals

Domenico Casati (born 21 June 1943 in Treviglio) is an Italian former professional footballer.
