= Angelo Caroli =

Italian footballer (1937–2020)

Personal information
- Date of birth: 7 April 1937
- Place of birth: L'Aquila, Italy
- Date of death: 17 November 2020 (aged 83)
- Place of death: Turin, Italy
- Position: Striker

Senior career*
Years	Team	Apps	(Gls)
1955–1957	Juventus	8	(1)
1957–1958	Catania	17	(3)
1958–1959	Lucchese	22	(7)
1959–1960	Pordenone	29	(6)
1960–1962	Juventus	5	(0)
1962–1963	Lecco	18	(0)
- * Club domestic league appearances and goals

Angelo Caroli (7 April 1937 – 17 November 2020) was an Italian professional footballer, journalist and author.

== Career ==
Caroli was born in L'Aquila. Caroli was a forward player.

At 27 he retired from football, and started to work for Tuttosport as a journalist. Writing became his next muse, and he started to publish poetry and novels. On 17 November 2020, Caroli died at the age of 83.

== Honours ==
- Serie A champion: 1960/61.

== Select bibliography ==
- Il grido: thriller (1998). Arezzo: Limina. ISBN 9788886713436
- Il volo della farfalla dalle piume azzurre : il killer della Sindone (2005). Turin: Fògola. ISBN 9788874060207
