= Virginio De Paoli =

Italian footballer

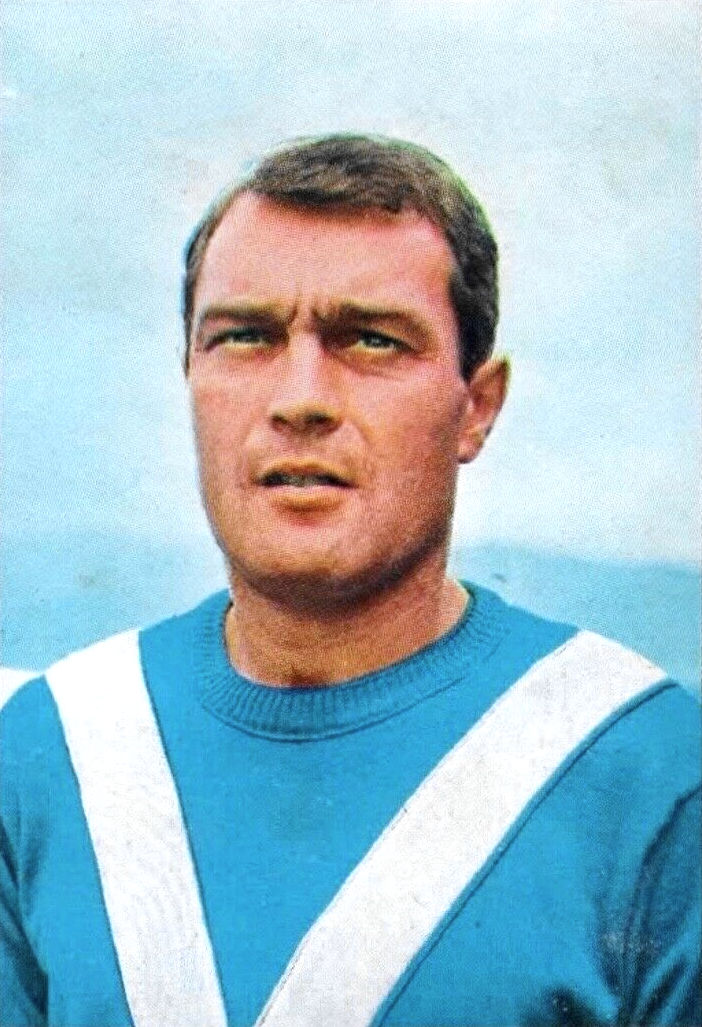
- De Paoli with Brescia in 1965

Personal information
- Date of birth: 22 June 1938
- Place of birth: Certosa di Pavia, Italy
- Date of death: 24 August 2009 (aged 71)
- Place of death: Brescia, Italy
- Height: 1.74 m (5 ft 8 1/2 in)
- Position: Striker

Senior career*
Years	Team	Apps	(Gls)
1958–1959	Varese	33	(10)
1959–1960	Pisa	36	(16)
1960–1961	Venezia	29	(9)
1961–1966	Brescia	168	(69)
1966–1968	Juventus	47	(16)
1968–1972	Brescia	93	(33)

International career
1966	Italy	3	(1)

Managerial career
- 1974–1976: Tharros
- * Club domestic league appearances and goals

Virginio De Paoli (Italian pronunciation: [virˈdʒiːnjo de ˈpaːoli]; 22 June 1938 – 24 August 2009) was an Italian professional football player and coach who played as a striker.

== Honours ==
Juventus

- Serie A champion: 1966–67.
