= Adolfo Gori =

Italian footballer and manager (born 1939)

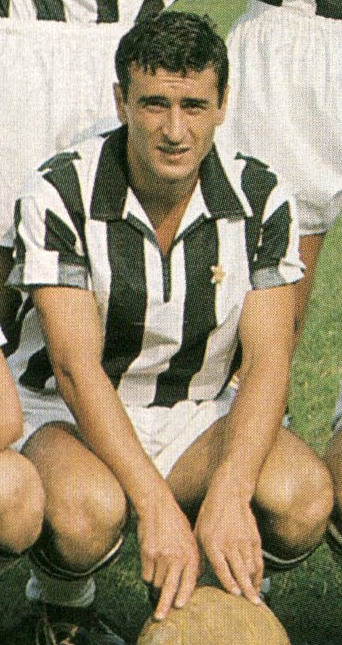
- Gori with Juventus in 1966

Personal information
- Date of birth: 13 February 1939 (age 87)
- Place of birth: Viareggio, Kingdom of Italy
- Height: 1.72 m (5 ft 7 1/2 in)
- Position: Defender

Senior career*
Years	Team	Apps	(Gls)
1956–1959	Viareggio	56	(0)
1959–1961	Lucchese	66	(3)
1961–1963	SPAL	63	(4)
1963–1969	Juventus	135	(3)
1969–1970	Brescia	17	(0)
1970–1972	Camaiore		
1972–1973	Rochester Lancers	38	(2)

International career
1967	Italy	1	(0)

Managerial career
- 1972: Rochester Lancers
- * Club domestic league appearances and goals

Adolfo Gori (Italian pronunciation: [aˈdolfo ˈɡɔːri]; born 13 February 1939) is a retired Italian professional footballer who played as a defender.

== Club career ==
=== Rochester Lancers ===
In 1972, Gori became a player-coach for the Rochester Lancers of the North American Soccer League. In 1977, he was named to the Rochester Lancers Team of the Decade.

== International career ==
Gori had his only appearance for the Italy national team on 25 June 1967 in a 1–0 win against Romania.

== Honours ==
Juventus

- Serie A champion: 1966–67.
- Coppa Italia winner: 1964–65.
