= Giovanni Sacco =

Italian footballer (1943–2020)

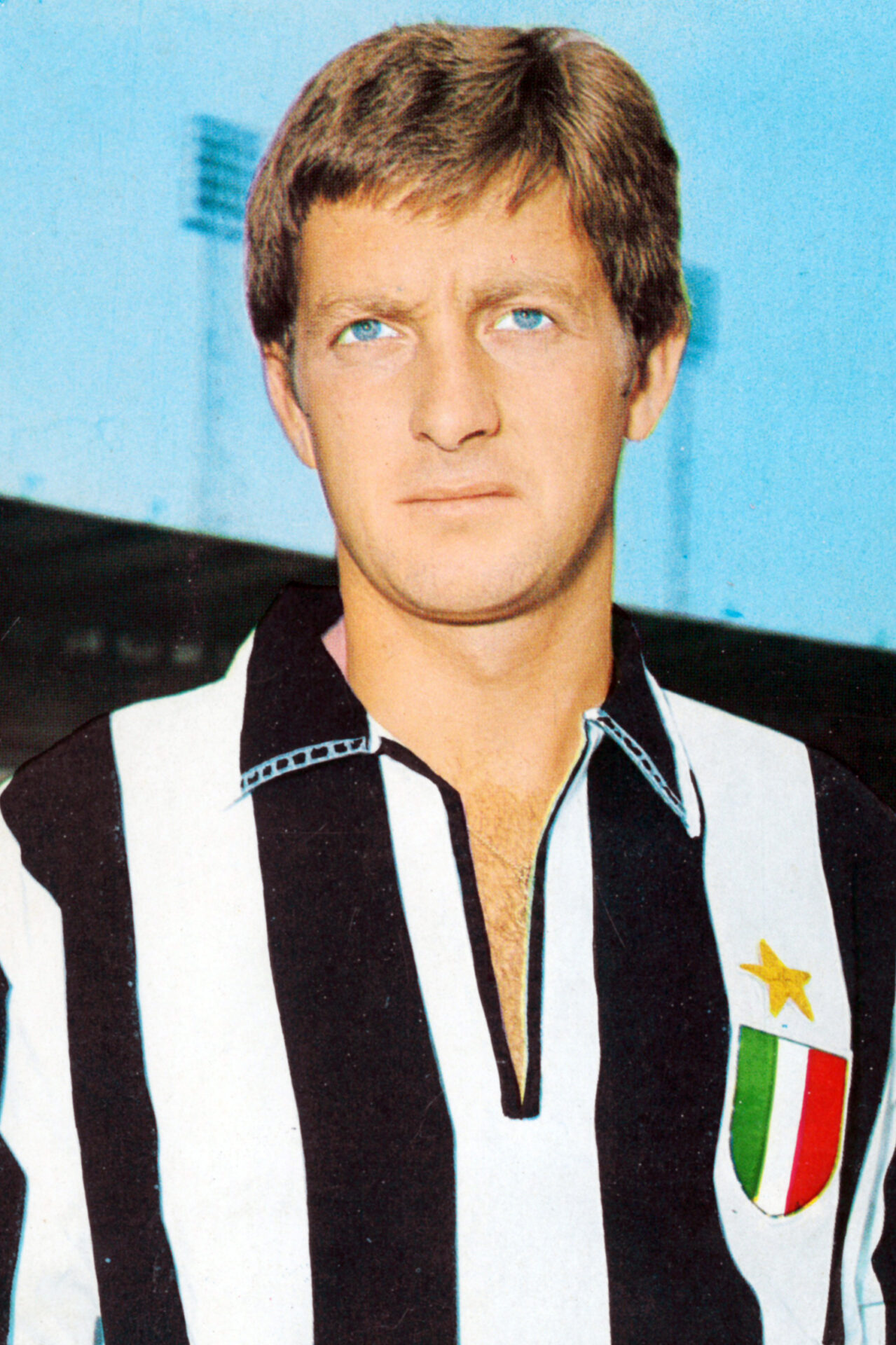
- Sacco with Juventus in the 1967–68 season

Personal information
- Date of birth: 25 September 1943
- Place of birth: San Damiano d'Asti, Italy
- Date of death: 17 December 2020 (aged 77)
- Place of death: Asti, Italy
- Height: 1.76 m (5 ft 9 1/2 in)
- Position: Midfielder

Senior career*
Years	Team	Apps	(Gls)
1962–1969	Juventus	84	(1)
1965–1966	→ Lazio (loan)	18	(3)
1969–1973	Atalanta	94	(10)
1973–1976	Reggiana	77	(9)
- * Club domestic league appearances and goals

Giovanni Sacco (25 September 1943 – 17 December 2020) was an Italian professional footballer who played as a midfielder.

He died from COVID-19 during the COVID-19 pandemic in Italy.

== Honours ==
Juventus

- Serie A champion: 1966–67.
