= Gianfranco Bozzao =

Italian footballer (1936–2019)

Personal information
- Date of birth: August 3, 1936
- Place of birth: Venice, Italy
- Date of death: May 24, 2019 (aged 82)
- Place of death: Ferrara
- Height: 1.78 m (5 ft 10 in)
- Position: Defender

Senior career*
Years	Team	Apps	(Gls)
1954–1956	Fiorentina	0	(0)
1956–1957	Salernitana	6	(0)
1957–1958	Arezzo	29	(0)
1958–1961	SPAL	70	(0)
1961–1962	Juventus	7	(0)
1962–1968	SPAL	158	(1)
1968–1969	Piacenza	28	(0)
- * Club domestic league appearances and goals

Gianfranco Bozzao (August 3, 1936 - May 24, 2019) was an Italian professional football player.
