= Gianni Romano =

Italian footballer

Personal information
- Date of birth: August 21, 1931
- Place of birth: Basiliano, Italy
- Date of death: August 24, 2010
- Place of death: Udine, Italy
- Position: Goalkeeper

Senior career*
Years	Team	Apps	(Gls)
1951–1960	Udinese	158	(0)
1952–1953	→ Venezia (loan)	32	(0)
1960–1961	Juventus	1	(0)
1961–1963	Udinese	19	(0)
- * Club domestic league appearances and goals

Gianni Romano (August 21, 1931 in Basiliano, Province of Udine – August 24, 2010 in Udine) was an Italian professional football player.

== Honours ==
- Serie A champion: 1960/61.
