= Elio Rinero =

Italian footballer (born 1947)

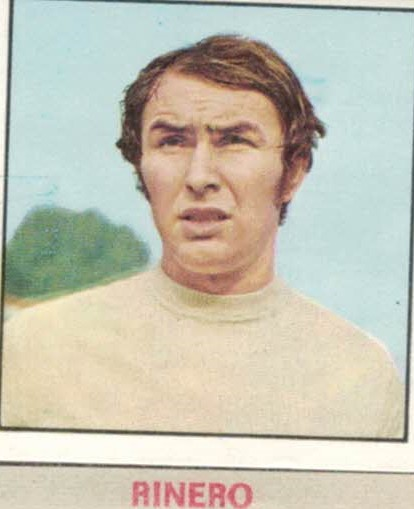

Personal information
- Date of birth: 8 April 1947 (age 79)
- Place of birth: Beinasco, Italy
- Height: 1.69 m (5 ft 6 1/2 in)
- Position: Midfielder

Senior career*
Years	Team	Apps	(Gls)
1966–1967	Juventus	5	(0)
1967–1968	Verona	13	(1)
1968–1969	Lazio	19	(3)
1969	Juventus	1	(0)
1969–1970	Genoa	24	(0)
1970–1971	Reggina	24	(0)
1971–1974	SPAL	87	(1)
1974–1975	Salernitana	25	(0)
1975–1976	Alessandria	0	(0)
1976–1977	Bari	2	(0)
- * Club domestic league appearances and goals

Elio Rinero (born 8 April 1947 in Beinasco, Italy) is a former Italian professional footballer who played as a midfielder.

== Honours ==
Juventus

- Serie A champion: 1966–67
