= Guido Onor =

Italian footballer

Personal information
- Date of birth: 20 June 1948 (age 78)
- Place of birth: Arona, Italy
- Height: 1.71 m (5 ft 7 1/2 in)
- Position: Midfielder

Senior career*
Years	Team	Apps	(Gls)
1966–1968	Juventus	2	(0)
1968–1969	Lazio	12	(0)
1969–1971	Monza	58	(0)
1971–1972	Livorno	36	(0)
1972–1974	Mantova	61	(0)
1974–1976	Messina	65	(2)
1976–1977	Salernitana	35	(1)
1977–1980	Messina	65	(2)
- * Club domestic league appearances and goals

Guido Onor (born 20 June 1948 in Arona) is an Italian former professional footballer.
