= Giuseppe Gaspari =

Italian footballer (1932–2025)

Personal information
- Date of birth: 6 September 1932
- Place of birth: Ascoli Piceno, Italy
- Date of death: 18 June 2025 (aged 92)
- Height: 1.82 m (6 ft 0 in)
- Position: Goalkeeper

Senior career*
Years	Team	Apps	(Gls)
1955–1959	Livorno	63	(0)
1959–1961	Catania	64	(0)
1961–1962	Juventus	4	(0)
1962–1965	Modena	40	(0)
1965–1966	Anconitana	0	(0)
- * Club domestic league appearances and goals

Giuseppe Gaspari (6 September 1932 – 18 June 2025) was an Italian professional footballer who played as a goalkeeper.

== Biography ==
Born in Ascoli Piceno, Gaspari played for five seasons for his hometown club before moving to Livorno and spending several seasons in Serie A with Catania and Juventus. He is also well-known for his run with Anconitana, that he saved from relegation in 1966, getting the nickname L'eroe di Rimini ('The Hero of Rimini').

After his retirement, he worked as an assistant coach and goalkeeping coach for Ancona, Vigor Senigallia and Jesina. He died on 18 June 2025, at the age of 92.
