= Angelo Martino Colombo =

Italian footballer (1935–2014)

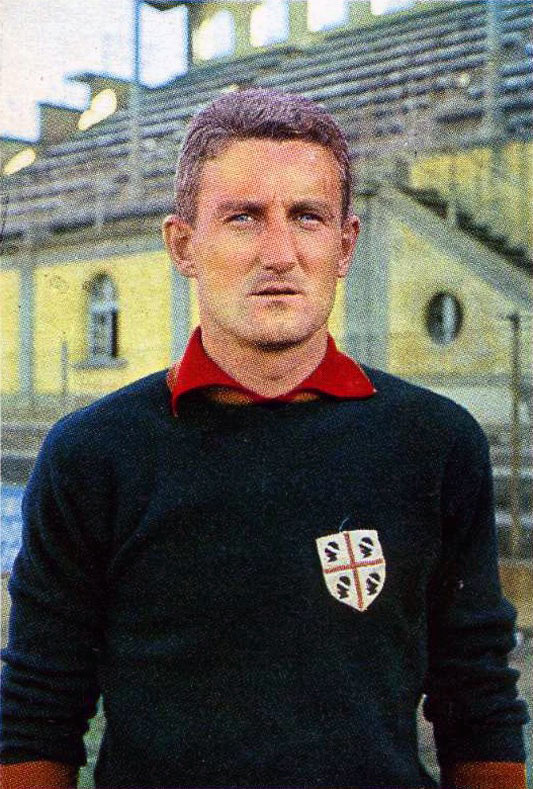
- Angelo Martino Colombo

Personal information
- Date of birth: 13 May 1935
- Place of birth: Gattinara, Italy
- Date of death: 13 March 2014 (aged 78)
- Height: 1.68 m (5 ft 6 in)
- Position: Goalkeeper

Senior career*
Years	Team	Apps	(Gls)
1954–1959	Pro Vercelli	169	(0)
1959–1960	Messina	27	(0)
1960–1965	Cagliari	165	(0)
1965–1968	Juventus	5	(0)
1968–1973	Hellas Verona	46	(0)
1973–1975	Omegna	2	(0)
Total		414	(0)
- * Club domestic league appearances and goals

Angelo Martino Colombo (13 May 1935 – 13 March 2014) was an Italian professional football player.

== Honours ==
- Serie A champion: 1966/67.
