= Alberto Coramini =

Italian footballer (1944-2015)

Personal information
- Date of birth: 2 August 1944
- Place of birth: Maserà di Padova, Italy
- Date of death: 17 February 2015 (aged 70)
- Place of death: Teolo, Italy
- Height: 1.77 m (5 ft 9 1/2 in)
- Position: Defender

Senior career*
Years	Team	Apps	(Gls)
1964–1965	Juventus	0	(0)
1965–1966	Potenza	26	(1)
1966–1968	Juventus	12	(0)
1968–1972	Pisa	82	(4)
1972–1976	Padova	123	(7)
1976–1978	Belluno	53	(6)
- * Club domestic league appearances and goals

Alberto Coramini (2 August 1944 – 17 February 2015) was an Italian professional football player.

== Honours ==
- Serie A champion: 1966/67.
- Coppa Italia winner: 1964/65.
