= Giampaolo Menichelli =

Italian footballer

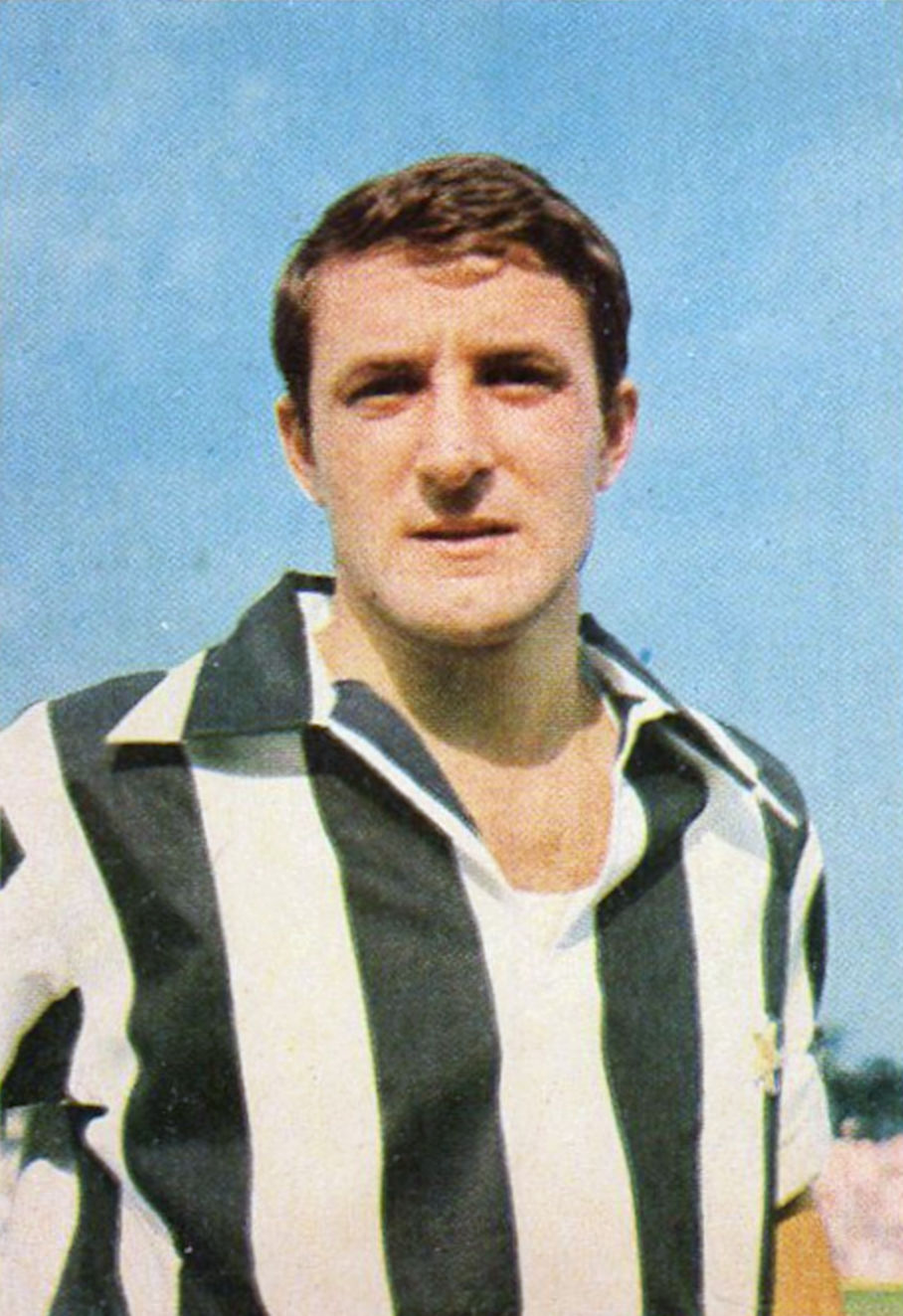
- Menichelli with Juventus in 1964

Personal information
- Date of birth: 29 June 1938 (age 88)
- Place of birth: Rome, Italy
- Height: 1.70 m (5 ft 7 in)
- Position: Forward

Senior career*
Years	Team	Apps	(Gls)
1957–1958	Roma	2	(0)
1958–1959	Sambenedettese	27	(6)
1959–1960	Parma	37	(8)
1960–1963	Roma	79	(14)
1963–1969	Juventus	144	(40)
1969–1970	Brescia	23	(6)
1970–1971	Cagliari	13	(0)
Total		325	(74)

International career
1962–1964	Italy	9	(1)
- * Club domestic league appearances and goals

Giampaolo Menichelli (Italian pronunciation: [dʒamˈpaːolo meniˈkɛlli]; born 29 June 1938) is an Italian footballer who played as a winger. Menichelli was a fast, agile winger, with good technical ability, and he was known for mainly being a team player, despite also having an eye for goal. His brother Franco was an Olympic champion in gymnastics.

== Club career ==
Menichelli played for 12 seasons (261 games, 60 goals) in the Serie A for A.S. Roma, A.C. Parma, Juventus FC, Brescia Calcio and Cagliari Calcio. Whilst at Roma, he formed a notable partnership with fellow winger Alberto Orlando, winning the 1960–61 Inter-Cities Fairs Cup. With Juventus he won the Coppa Italia over Herrera's "Grande Inter" during the 1964–65 season, finishing the competition as top scorer, with 3 goals, also reaching the final of the 1964–65 Inter-Cities Fairs Cup, only to lose 1–0 to Ferencváros in Turin. He also won the 1966–67 Serie A title during his six seasons in Turin, scoring an impressive 11 goals in 33 appearances during the league winning season.

== International career ==
Menichelli also represented the Italy national football team during the 1960s; in total, he earned 9 caps for Italy between 1962 and 1964, scoring a single goal for Italy in a 3–1 away win against Belgium on 13 May 1962. He participated in the 1962 FIFA World Cup with Italy, making two appearances against Germany and Chile as Italy were rather disappointingly eliminated in the group stage.

== Honours ==
=== Club ===
Juventus

- Serie A: 1966–67
- Coppa Italia: 1964–65

Roma

- Inter-Cities Fairs Cup: 1960–61

=== Individual ===
- Coppa Italia Top Goal Scorer: 1964–65
