= Gianfranco Zigoni =

Italian footballer (born 1944)

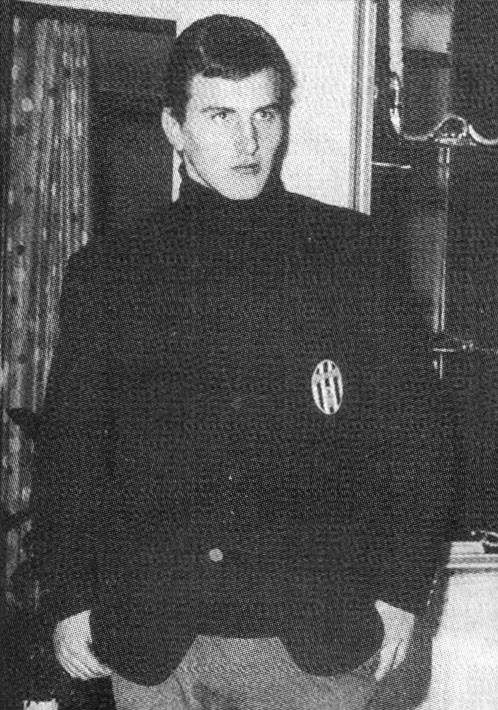
- Zigoni with Juventus in the 1960s

Personal information
- Full name: Gianfranco Cesare Battista Zigoni
- Date of birth: 25 November 1944 (age 81)
- Place of birth: Oderzo, Kingdom of Italy
- Height: 1.76 m (5 ft 9 in)
- Positions: Striker; left winger

Senior career*
Years	Team	Apps	(Gls)
1961–1970	Juventus	86	(23)
1964–1966	→ Genoa (loan)	58	(16)
1970–1972	A.S. Roma	49	(12)
1972–1978	Verona	139	(29)
1978–1980	Brescia	40	(4)
1980–1983	Opitergina		
1983–1987	Piavon		

International career
1967	Italy	1	(0)
- * Club domestic league appearances and goals

Gianfranco Zigoni (Italian pronunciation: [dʒaɱˈfraŋko ddziˈɡoːni]; born 25 November 1944 in Oderzo) is an Italian former footballer who played as a forward or as a midfielder. Nicknamed Zigogol by his fans, he was a prolific goalscorer, and played for several major Serie A throughout his career in the 1960s and the 1970s, including Juventus and A.S. Roma. He was capable of playing both as a striker and as a left winger.Zigoni was known in particular for his talent and skillful playing style, as well as his 'colourful' personality and 'rebellious' character.

== Career ==
Zigoni started his professional career at the age of 17 with Juventus, playing only four games in three seasons with the bianconeri (scoring one goal), and being successively loaned out to Genoa in 1964. With the rossoblu jersey, he spent a season in the Serie A, with the loan being renewed for another year following Genoa's relegation to Serie B. In 1966 he returned to Juventus, stayed with the bianconeri until 1970 before leaving the club partly due to his strained relationship with then Juve boss Heriberto Herrera. During this period, he also played his only game with the Italian team, a 1–0 win against Romania on 25 June 1967.

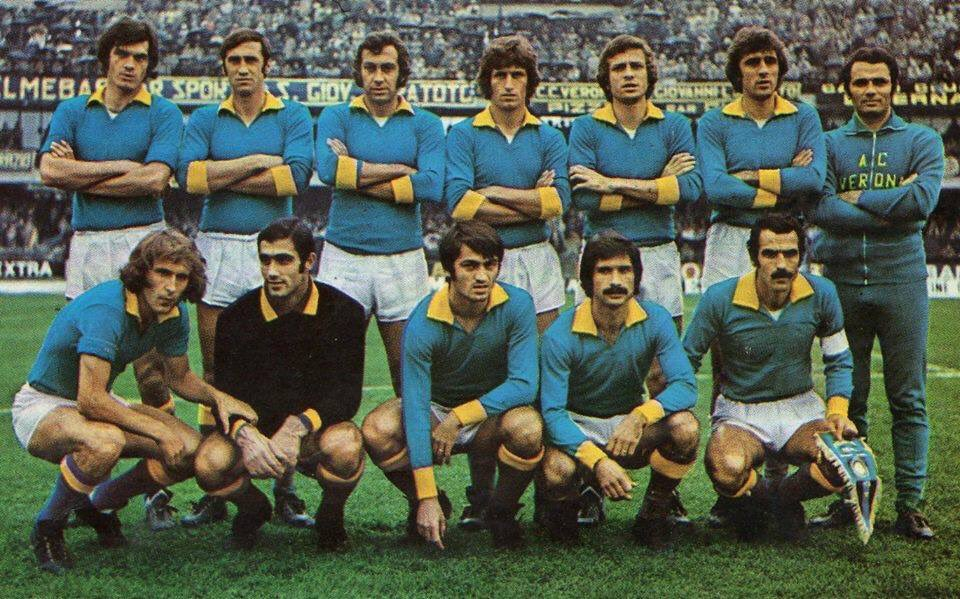
Zigoni (crouched, first from left) with Verona in 1973

He successively signed for A.S. Roma, spending two seasons under the guidance of Helenio Herrera and scoring 12 goals with the giallorossi. In 1972, he moved to Verona, quickly becoming a team mainstay and a fan favourite, and playing six seasons with the scaligeri. In 1978, aged 34, he signed for Serie B's Brescia, playing two seasons with the rondinelle mostly as a backup player.

In 1980, he left professional football and returned to his native Oderzo, joining the local Serie D team, Opitergina. In 1983, he joined an offer from Terza Categoria club US Piavon, playing until the age of 43.

== Personal life ==
Zigoni has four children. Of them, Gianmarco, an A.C. Milan player, has later become a footballer and made his debut with Serie B's Treviso in January 2009. He also scoring a goal in his first professional match.

== Honours ==
Juventus

- Serie A: 1962–63, 1966–67
- Coppa delle Alpi: 1963

Roma

- Anglo-Italian Cup: 1972
