= Erminio Favalli =

Italian footballer (1944–2008)

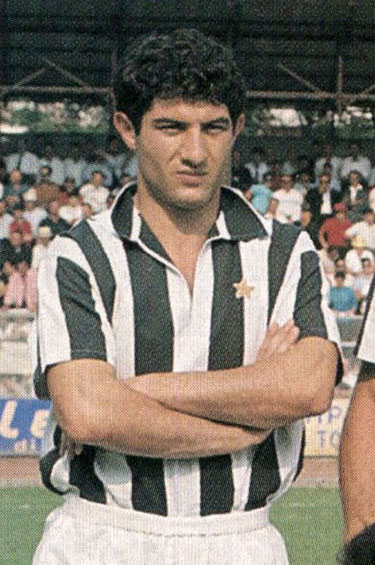
- Favalli with Juventus in 1966

Personal information
- Date of birth: 29 January 1944
- Place of birth: Cremona, Kingdom of Italy
- Date of death: 18 April 2008 (aged 64)
- Place of death: Cremona, Italy
- Position: Right winger

Senior career*
Years	Team	Apps	(Gls)
1963–1964	Cremonese	45	(0)
1964–1965	Inter Milan	0	(0)
1965–1966	Foggia	28	(1)
1966–1970	Juventus	60	(2)
1970–1971	Mantova	30	(1)
1971–1977	Palermo	183	(6)
Total		346	(10)
- * Club domestic league appearances and goals

Erminio Favalli (29 January 1944 – 18 April 2008) was an Italian football player and managing director, who played as a midfielder. He spent most of his playing career with Juventus and Palermo, and joined Cremonese as part of the managing staff after his retirement from active football.

== Playing career ==
Favalli was born 1944 in Cremona, and started his playing career with hometown club Cremonese, then in Serie C. He later joined Inter Milan, then moving to Foggia the following year. From 1966 to 1970 he played for Juventus. He then moved to Mantova before to join Palermo, where he spent seven seasons as a rosanero mainstay. He retired in 1977.

Favalli won a total of two Serie A championships: with Internazionale in 1964–65, and with Juventus in 1966–67.

== Post-playing career ==
In 1982, Favalli started a career as director of football with Cremonese, his first professional team as a player. He then filled the same position for Palermo in the 1980s before to return to Cremonese, where he oversaw the club successes in the 1990s, including an Anglo-Italian Cup won in 1993. From 2002 to 2007 he worked with Pizzighettone, being part of the club management that led the minor Lombardian side from Serie D to Serie C1. He returned to Cremonese for the 2007–08 season, this time as Emiliano Mondonico's assistant coach.

== Death ==
Favalli suddenly died in Cremona on 18 April 2008, aged 64, because of a fatal heart attack.
