= 1966–67 Serie A =

64th season of top-tier Italian football

Serie A
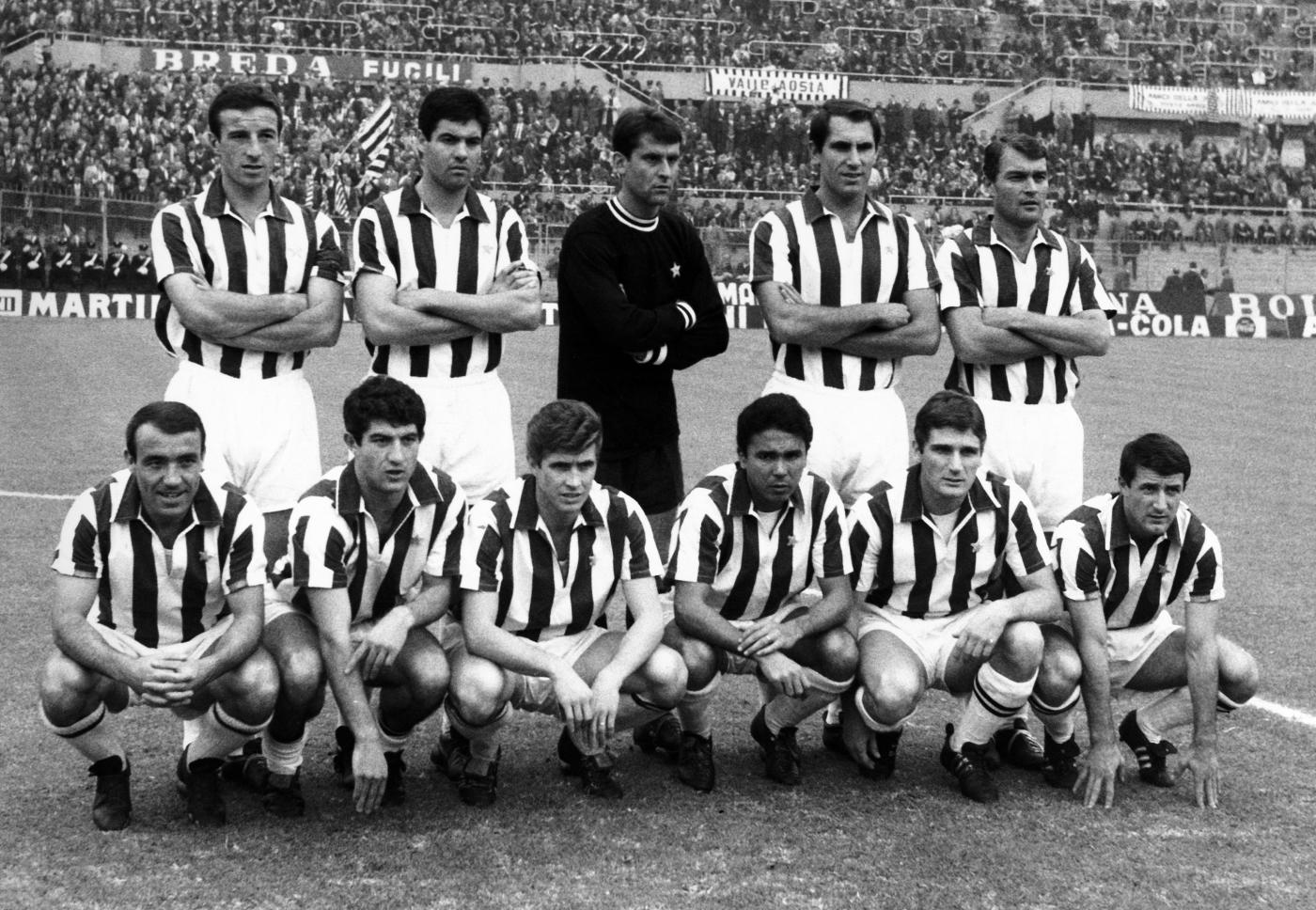
- 1966–67 Juventus team
- Season: 1966–67
- Dates: 18 September 1966 – 1 June 1967
- Champions: Juventus; 13th title
- Relegated: Lazio; Foggia; Venezia; Lecco
- European Cup: Juventus
- Cup Winners' Cup: Milan
- Inter-Cities Fairs Cup: Bologna; Napoli; Fiorentina
- Matches: 306
- Goals: 613 (2 per match)
- Top goalscorer: Gigi Riva (18 goals)

Serie A 1966-67 team distribution

The 1966–67 Serie A season was won by Juventus, it was their second scudetto of the 1960s. The season was closely contested and went down to the final day of the season; Internazionale were left needing just a draw or having Juventus not beat Lazio to win the title. However, Inter lost 1–0 on the final day to Mantova thanks to a goal from one of their former players, Beniamino Di Giacomo. Juventus on the other hand beat Lazio 2–1 to take their 13th title.

== Teams ==
Venezia, Lecco and Mantova had been promoted from Serie B.

== Events ==
A transitional relegation place was added to reduce the league to 16 clubs.

Six out of the eighteen clubs came from Lombardy, a record for a single region of Italy.

== Final classification ==
Pos	Team	Pld	W	D	L	GF	GA	GD	Pts	Qualification or relegation
1	Juventus (C)	34	18	13	3	44	19	+25	49	Qualification to European Cup
2	Internazionale	34	19	10	5	59	22	+37	48	
3	Bologna	34	18	9	7	48	27	+21	45	Chosen for Inter-Cities Fairs Cup
4	Napoli	34	17	10	7	46	23	+23	44	Chosen for Inter-Cities Fairs Cup
5	Fiorentina	34	15	13	6	53	29	+24	43	Chosen for Inter-Cities Fairs Cup
6	Cagliari	34	13	14	7	35	17	+18	40	
7	Torino	34	10	18	6	33	26	+7	38	
8	Milan	34	11	15	8	36	32	+4	37	Qualification to Cup Winners' Cup
9	Mantova	34	6	22	6	22	23	−1	34	
10	Roma	34	11	11	12	35	39	−4	33	
11	Atalanta	34	9	13	12	28	43	−15	31	
12	SPAL	34	8	13	13	28	36	−8	29	
13	Vicenza	34	7	14	13	26	39	−13	28	
13	Brescia	34	7	14	13	22	40	−18	28	
15	Lazio (R)	34	6	15	13	20	35	−15	27	Relegation to Serie B
16	Foggia (R)	34	7	10	17	28	49	−21	24	Relegation to Serie B
17	Venezia (R)	34	4	9	21	29	57	−28	17	Relegation to Serie B
17	Lecco (R)	34	3	11	20	21	57	−36	17	Relegation to Serie B

Source: Panini
(C) Champions; (R) Relegated

== Results ==
Home \ Away	ATA	BOL	BRE	CAG	FIO	FOG	INT	JUV	LRV	LAZ	LCO	MAN	MIL	NAP	ROM	SPA	TOR	VEN
Atalanta		1–0	2–1	1–0	0–0	2–0	0–5	0–2	0–0	3–0	1–0	0–0	0–0	1–1	2–4	0–1	1–1	1–0
Bologna	2–1		2–0	1–1	1–1	5–0	3–2	2–0	2–0	1–0	2–0	1–1	2–0	1–0	2–0	2–0	2–1	0–0
Brescia	0–0	0–2		1–2	0–0	0–0	0–3	1–1	0–0	1–0	2–0	1–1	0–0	1–0	3–3	0–0	0–1	3–2
Cagliari	3–1	4–0	2–0		1–0	0–0	1–1	0–0	0–0	1–0	3–1	0–0	0–0	0–0	2–1	1–1	2–0	4–0
Fiorentina	1–1	1–1	7–1	1–0		0–1	1–2	1–2	3–0	5–1	2–0	0–0	1–0	1–1	2–2	0–0	1–0	2–0
Foggia	4–1	0–1	0–1	0–0	1–2		0–4	0–0	2–2	2–1	4–1	2–1	0–2	1–1	2–2	0–0	0–0	3–0
Internazionale	2–0	2–1	1–0	2–1	1–1	3–0		1–1	2–0	0–0	1–1	1–1	4–0	1–1	0–0	2–1	1–2	2–1
Juventus	0–0	2–1	0–0	1–0	4–1	3–0	1–0		2–0	2–1	3–0	1–1	1–1	2–0	2–0	2–1	0–0	2–1
Vicenza	1–2	0–0	1–1	0–2	3–1	3–1	0–5	0–1		0–0	3–0	2–2	1–1	2–1	0–1	1–0	0–1	2–1
Lazio	1–3	2–1	0–2	0–1	0–0	2–1	1–0	0–0	0–0		2–0	1–0	0–0	0–0	0–1	1–1	0–0	1–1
Lecco	0–0	1–2	1–0	0–2	0–3	3–0	0–2	1–3	0–0	0–1		0–0	1–1	0–3	2–2	1–1	0–0	2–1
Mantova	0–0	1–1	0–0	0–0	0–0	0–1	1–0	1–1	2–0	0–0	1–1		1–0	0–2	1–0	1–0	0–0	2–1
Milan	0–0	1–1	0–1	2–1	0–2	3–1	0–1	3–1	2–0	2–2	1–1	2–2		1–0	3–1	2–0	1–1	2–1
Napoli	3–0	2–1	1–1	1–0	1–2	3–2	0–0	0–1	1–0	1–0	4–1	1–0	3–2		2–0	1–0	2–1	4–0
Roma	3–2	0–2	1–0	0–0	0–1	0–0	0–0	1–0	1–1	0–0	2–1	1–1	0–1	0–2		1–0	4–0	1–0
SPAL	1–0	1–0	1–1	0–0	1–2	1–0	1–3	1–1	1–1	4–1	2–1	1–1	1–1	1–4	1–0		0–0	3–2
Torino	6–1	1–1	3–0	1–0	2–2	1–0	0–2	0–0	1–1	1–1	1–1	2–0	0–0	0–0	3–1	2–1		0–0
Venezia	1–1	1–2	3–0	1–1	2–6	1–0	2–3	0–2	0–2	1–1	2–0	0–0	1–2	0–0	1–2	1–0	1–1	

Source: Almanacco Illustrato del Calcio - La Storia 1898-2004, Panini Edizioni, Modena, September 2005 (in Italian)
Legend: Blue = home team win; Yellow = draw; Red = away team win.

== Top goalscorers ==
Rank	Player	Club	Goals
1	(Italy) Gigi Riva	Cagliari	18
2	(Italy) Sandro Mazzola	Internazionale	17
3	(Sweden) Kurt Hamrin	Fiorentina	15
3	(Brazil) (Italy) José Altafini	Napoli	15
5	(Italy) Mario Brugnera	Fiorentina	13
6	(Italy) Gianni Rivera	Milan	12
7	(Italy) Giampaolo Menichelli	Juventus	11
8	(Spain) Joaquín Peiró	Roma	10
8	(Italy) Ezio Pascutti	Bologna	10
10	(Italy) Roberto Boninsegna	Cagliari	9
10	(Italy) Gigi Meroni	Torino	9
10	(Italy) Angelo Domenghini	Internazionale	9
10	(Italy) Renato Cappellini	Internazionale	9
10	(Germany) Helmut Haller	Bologna	9

== Attendances ==
#	Club	Average
1	Napoli	75,797
2	Internazionale	45,482
3	Roma	35,375
4	Milan	33,382
5	Fiorentina	26,858
6	Juventus	25,551
7	Bologna	24,608
8	Brescia	22,997
9	Lazio	21,680
10	Cagliari	18,334
11	Torino	17,147
12	Foggia	13,275
13	Mantova	12,896
14	Atalanta	12,333
15	Venezia	11,929
16	SPAL	11,793
17	Vicenza	10,692
18	Lecco	8,593

== References and sources ==
- Almanacco Illustrato del Calcio - La Storia 1898-2004, Panini Edizioni, Modena, September 2005
