= 1958–59 Juventus FC season =

Italian football club season

Juventus
1958–59 season
- Owner: Agnelli family
- President: Umberto Agnelli
- Manager: Ljubiša Broćić (until 16 November 1958); Teobaldo Depetrini
- Stadium: Comunale
- Serie A: 4th
- Coppa Italia: Winners
- Top goalscorer: League: John Charles (19); All: Charles; Omar Sivori (25)
Home colours	Away colours

During the 1958–59 season Juventus competed in Serie A, Coppa Italia and European Cup .

== Summary ==
During summer President Umberto Agnelli transferred in several players such as: Defender Ernesto Castano, midfielder Piero Aggradi (after a loan ended), Luigi Fuin and Gianfranco Leoncini, meanwhile playing his last season Ermes Muccinelli (future club legend), along with Francesco Stacchino and Swedish midfielder Karl-Erik Palmér the latter a notorious flop for the campaign.

On 16 December 1958 in the gala of the 1958 Ballon d'Or, several squad players competed for the trophy, included Welsh Forward John Charles (finishing in a 4th place), Bruno Nicolè and Giampiero Boniperti.

In League, the team reached a disappointing 4th place in spite of the "Trio Magico" (Charles-Sivori-Boniperti) scoring a massive quantity of goals for the third consecutive season.

The club had its debut in the European Cup, and was chaotic, in a series of two-legs in preliminary round against Wiener Sport-Club from Austria, after a 3–1 won match in Turin thanks to a hat-trick of Omar Sívori the squad collapsed in Vienna, without and injured John Charles the squad lost 0–7 at the Praterstadion being eliminated early out of the competition.

After a 5–4 lost match in Turin against Milan, included arguments between the head coach and the star Forward Omar Sívori, the Yugoslavian manager Ljubiša Broćić was fired and replaced by Teobaldo Depetrini.

At the end of the season, however, the squad clinched the 1959 Coppa Italia Final defeating Internazionale in San Siro with a 4–1 score.

== Squad ==
Source: Note: Flags indicate national team as defined under FIFA eligibility rules; some limited exceptions apply. Players may hold more than one non-FIFA nationality.

Pos.	Nation	Player
GK	ITA	Carlo Mattrel
GK	ITA	Giuseppe Vavassori
DF	ITA	Benito Boldi
DF	ITA	Giuseppe Corradi
DF	ITA	Bruno Garzena
DF	ITA	Ernesto Castano
DF	ITA	Rino Ferrario
MF	ITA	Flavio Emoli
MF	ITA	Umberto Colombo
MF	ITA	Gianfranco Leoncini
MF	ITA	Piero Aggradi
MF	ITA	Luigi Fuin

Pos.	Nation	Player
MF	SWE	Karl-Erik Palmér
MF	ITA	Antonio Montico
MF	ITA	Giorgio Turchi
FW	ITA	Giampiero Boniperti
FW	ITA	Bruno Nicolè
FW	ITA	Gino Stacchini
FW	ITA	Giorgio Stivanello
FW	ITA	Ermes Muccinelli
FW	ITA	Francesco Stacchino
FW	ARG	Omar Sívori
FW	WAL	John Charles

=== Transfers ===
In
Pos.	Name	from	Type
DF	Ernesto Castano	Triestina	
MF	Piero Aggradi	Palermo	
MF	Luigi Fuin	SS Lazio	
FW	Ermes Muccinelli	SS Lazio	
MF	Karl-Erik Palmér	Legnano	

Out
Pos.	Name	To	Type
GK	Giovanni Viola	Brescia	
DF	Bruno Barbieri		
DF	Giuseppe Patrucco	Monza	
FW	Giorgio Bartolini		
FW	Piergiorgio Sartore		

== Competitions ==
=== Serie A ===
==== League table ====
Pos	Team	Pld	W	D	L	GF	GA	GD	Pts
2	Fiorentina	34	20	9	5	95	35	+60	49
3	Internazionale	34	20	6	8	77	41	+36	46
4	Juventus	34	16	10	8	74	51	+23	42
5	Sampdoria	34	15	8	11	50	44	+6	38
6	Roma	34	12	11	11	57	41	+16	35

Source: Panini

==== Results by round ====
Round	1	2	3	4	5	6	7	8	9	10	11	12	13	14	15	16	17	18	19	20	21	22	23	24	25	26	27	28	29	30	31	32	33	34	35
Ground	H	A	H	A	H	A	H	A	H	H	A	H	A	H	A	A	H	A	H	H	A	H	A	H	A	H	H	A	H	H	A	H	A	H	A
Result	D	W	W	W	L	W	D	L	D	L	-	W	W	D	D	W	W	W	D	W	W	D	W	L	W	D	D	L	W	L	D	L	W	L	W
Position	6	4	2	1	3	2	2	4	5	6	8	6	3	4	4	4	4	4	4	3	3	4	3	3	3	3	3	4	3	4	4	4	4	4	4

Source: http://calcio-seriea.net/partite/1958/477/
A = Away; H = Home; W = Win; D = Draw; L = Loss; = Leader, 1959–60 European Cup; = Relegation to 1959–60 Serie B

==== Matches ====
- .- Source:http://calcio-seriea.net/partite/1958/477/

21 September 1958 1	SPAL	0–0	Juventus	Ferrara
16:00 CET				Stadium: Comunale; Referee: Marchese

28 September 1958 2	Juventus	3–0	Udinese	Turin
16:00 CET	Charles 22'; Boniperti 43', 62'			Stadium: Comunale; Referee: Butti

5 October 1958 3	Padova	1–4	Juventus	Padua
15:30 CET	Brighenti 16'		26' (o.g.) Blason; 61' Montico; 77' (o.g.) Zannier; 83' Stacchini	Stadium: Stadio Silvio Appiani; Referee: Orlandini

12 October 1958 4	Juventus	2–0	SSC Napoli	Turin
15:30 CET	Nicolè 5'; Sívori 47'			Stadium: Comunale; Referee: Guarnaschelli

19 October 1958 5	AS Roma	3–0	Juventus	Rome
15:00 CET	Da Costa 55', 67'; Selmosson 76'			Stadium: Olimpico; Referee: Rigato (Mestre)

26 October 1958 6	Juventus	4–3	Torino	Turin
15:00 CET	Sívori 7', 54'; Stacchini 40'; Nicolè 48'		45' Virgili; 50' (o.g.) Boldi; 72' Mazzero	Stadium: Comunale; Referee: Orlandini

2 November 1958 7	Fiorentina	3–3	Juventus	Florence
14:30 CET	Cervato 30' (pen.); Montuori 45'; Lojacono 60'		11' (pen.) Ferrario; 13' Nicolè; 32' Charles	Stadium: Comunale; Referee: Lo Bello

16 November 1958 8	Juventus	4–5	AC Milan	Turin
14:30 CET	Boniperti 39'; Corradi 62'; Charles 73'; Sívori 81'		24', 90' Grillo; 30' Galli; 33', 66' Altafini	Stadium: Comunale; Referee: Jonni

23 November 1958 9	AS Bari	1–1	Juventus	Bari
14:30 CET	Bredesen 50'		63' Boniperti	Stadium: Stadio della Vittoria; Referee: Ferrari

30 November 1958 10	Juventus	2–3	Lanerossi Vicenza	Turin
14:30 CET	Charles 6' (pen.); Boniperti 34'		17' Agnoletto; 61' Menti; 85' Campana	Stadium: Comunale; Referee: Butti (Como)

7 December 1958 11	Inter	suspd.	Juventus	Milan
14:00 CET				Stadium: San Siro; Referee: Orlandini
Note: Match was suspended on in the 58th minute by due to fog with the score at 2–0 (with goals from Angelillo, who scored a penalty in the 22nd minute and Firmani in the 34th minute.

18 December 1958 11	Inter	1–3	Juventus	Milan
14:00 CET	Bicicli 22'		15' Charles; 41' Nicolè; 61' Sívori	Stadium: San Siro; Referee: Rigato
Note: Match rescheduled from 7 December 1958.

21 December 1958 12	Juventus	1–0	Sampdoria	Turin
14:30 CET	Sívori 16'			Stadium: Comunale; Referee: Moriconi

28 December 1958 13	Alessandria	2–2	Juventus	Alessandria
14:30 CET	Lorenzi 8', 10'		58' Nicolè; 89' Corradi	Stadium: Stadio Giuseppe Moccagatta; Referee: Mori

4 January 1959 14	Juventus	2–2	Bologna	Turin
14:30 CET	Sívori 11'; Charles 87' (pen.)		71' Maschio; 90' Bodi	Stadium: Comunale; Referee: Adami

11 January 1959 15	Triestina	0–3	Juventus	Trieste
14:30 CET			11', 58', 75' Nicolè	Stadium: Comunale; Referee: Jonni

18 January 1959 16	Juventus	6–1	SS Lazio	Turin
14:30 CET	Sívori 9', 85'; Nicolè 30', 80'; Stivanello 34'; Colombo 60'		16' Bizzarri	Stadium: Comunale; Referee: Lo Bello (Siracusa)

25 January 1959 17	Genoa	0–1	Juventus	Genoa
15:00 CET			28' Sívori	Stadium: Stadio Luigi Ferraris; Referee: Orlandini

1 February 1959 18	Juventus	1–1	SPAL	Turin
14:30 CET	Charles 63'		26' Morbello	Stadium: Comunale; Referee: Moriconi

8 February 1959 19	Udinese	0–4	Juventus	Udine
14:30 CET			67', 69' Charles; 80' Boniperti; 82' Nicolè	Stadium: Stadio Moretti; Referee: Jonni

15 February 1959 20	Juventus	2–1	Padova	Turin
15:00 CET	Charles 18', 71'		9' (o.g.) Castano	Stadium: Comunale; Referee: Annoscia

22 February 1959 21	SSC Napoli	0–0	Juventus	Naples
15:00 CET				Stadium: Stadio della Liberazione; Referee: Lo Bello

8 March 1959 22	Juventus	2–0	AS Roma	Turin
15:00 CET	Charles 63'; Nicolè 67'			Stadium: Comunale; Referee: Jonni

15 March 1959 23	Torino	3–2	Juventus	Turin
15:00 CET	Virgili 9', 30', 32'		27' Charles; 69' Nicolè	Stadium: Comunale; Referee: Orlandini

22 March 1959 24	Juventus	3–2	Fiorentina	Turin
15:00 CET	Sívori 38', 63', 86'		28' (pen.) Lojacono; 74' Gratton	Stadium: Comunale; Referee: Marchese

29 March 1959 25	AC Milan	1–1	Juventus	Milan
15:30 CET	Altafini 47'		73' Boniperti	Stadium: San Siro; Attendance: 75 000; Referee: Jonni

5 April 1959 26	Juventus	2–2	AS Bari	Turin
15:30 CET	Sívori 21'; Stacchino 59'		35' Conti; 47' Erba	Stadium: Comunale; Referee: Orlandini

12 April 1959 27	Lanerossi Vicenza	1–0	Juventus	Vicenza
15:30 CET	Conti 55'			Stadium: Stadio Romeo Menti; Referee: De Robbio

19 April 1959 28	Juventus	3–2	Inter	Turin
15:30 CET	Emoli 61'; Ferrario 79'; Boniperti 88'		11' Firmani; 75' Corso	Stadium: Comunale; Referee: Lo Bello

26 April 1959 29	Sampdoria	3–2	Juventus	Genoa
15:30 CET	Milani 9'; Mora 49', 83'		71' Leoncini; 88' Charles	Stadium: Stadio Luigi Ferraris; Referee: Marchese

17 May 1959 30	Juventus	2–2	Alessandria	Turin
16:00 CET	Colombo 23'; Charles 60'		8' Filini; 65' Pistorello	Stadium: Comunale; Referee: Righi (Milan)

24 May 1959 31	Bologna	4–1	Juventus	Bologna
16:00 CET	Pascutti 10', 85'; Bonafin 52', 55'		40' Stacchini	Stadium: Comunale; Referee: Cariani

28 May 1959 32	Juventus	4–0	Triestina	Turin
16:30 CET	Sívori 13'; Charles 24'; Stivanello 65'; Stacchini 83'			Stadium: Comunale; Referee: Grignani

2 June 1959[2] 33	SS Lazio	1–0	Juventus	Rome
16:30 CET	Corradi 37' (o.g.)			Stadium: Olimpico; Referee: (France) Groppi

6 June 1959[3] 34	Juventus	4–3	Genoa	Turin
21:30 CET	Charles 5', 59', 64'; Stivanello 24'		12' Maccacaro; 42' Pantaleoni; 83' Abbadie	Stadium: Comunale; Referee: De Marchi

=== Coppa Italia ===
==== Eightfinals ====
22 April 1959	Juventus	6–2 (a.e.t.)	Alessandria	Turin
21:15 CET	Charles 43', 97', 116'; Sívori 52', 92', 108'		67' Filini; 68' Vonlanthen	Stadium: Comunale; Referee: Gay (Asti)

==== Quarterfinals ====
10 June 1959	Juventus	3–1	Fiorentina	Turin
21:30 CET	Stivanello 39' (pen.); Charles 59'; Nicolè 89'		65' Petris	Stadium: Comunale; Attendance: 8 000; Referee: Gambarotta

==== Semifinals ====
6 September 1959	Juventus	3–1	Genoa	Turin
21:30 CET	Cervato 35' (pen.); Sívori 60'; Nicolè 74'		50' Barison	Stadium: Comunale; Referee: Marchese

==== Final ====
13 September 1959	Inter	1–4	Juventus	Milan
16:30	Bicicli 36'		7' Charles; 27', 79' (pen.) Cervato; 65' Sívori	Stadium: San Siro; Attendance: 80 000; Referee: Jonni

=== European Cup ===
==== Preliminary round ====
24 September 1958 1	Juventus (Italy)	3–1	(Austria) Wiener SK	Turin
21:30 CET	Sívori 2', 56', 62'		8' Horak	Stadium: Comunale; Referee: (Switzerland) Gulde

1 October 1958 2	Wiener SK (Austria)	7–0	(Italy) Juventus	Wien
19:00 CET	Skerlan 24'; Hamerl 34', 38', 64', 80'; Hof 82' (pen.), 85'			Stadium: Praterstadion; Attendance: 35 000; Referee: (Switzerland) Wyssling

== Statistics ==
=== Players statistics ===
No.	Pos	Nat	Player	Total		1958-59 Serie A	
No.	Pos	Nat	Player	Apps	Goals	Apps	Goals
	GK	(Italy) ITA	Carlo Mattrel	20	-36	20	-36
	DF	(Italy) ITA	Giuseppe Corradi	32	2	32	2
	DF	(Italy) ITA	Bruno Garzena	27	0	27	0
	MF	(Italy) ITA	Flavio Emoli	26	1	26	1
	MF	(Italy) ITA	Umberto Colombo	28	2	28	2
	MF	(Italy) ITA	Gino Stacchini	25	4	25	4
	FW	(Italy) ITA	Giampiero Boniperti	26	8	26	8
	FW	(Italy) ITA	Giorgio Stivanello	23	3	23	3
	FW	(Italy) ITA	Bruno Nicolè	21	13	21	13
	FW	(Argentina) ARG	Omar Sívori	24	15	24	15
	FW	(Wales) WAL	John Charles	29	19	29	19
	GK	(Italy) ITA	Giuseppe Vavassori	14	-15	14	-15
	DF	(Italy) ITA	Rino Ferrario	20	2	20	2
	FW	(Italy) ITA	Ermes Muccinelli	15	0	15	0
	DF	(Italy) ITA	Ernesto Castano	14	0	14	0
	MF	(Italy) ITA	Luigi Fuin	8	0	8	0
	DF	(Italy) ITA	Benito Boldi	6	0	6	0
	MF	(Italy) ITA	Giorgio Turchi	4	0	4	0
	MF	(Italy) ITA	Antonio Montico	3	0	3	0
	MF	(Sweden) SWE	Karl-Erik Palmér	3	0	3	0
	MF	(Italy) ITA	Gianfranco Leoncini	3	0	3	0
	FW	(Italy) ITA	Francesco Stacchino	2	0	2	0
	MF	(Italy) ITA	Piero Aggradi	1	0	1	0

- Source: http://calcio-seriea.net/presenze/1958/477/
