= 1959 Coppa Italia final =

11th Coppa Italia final
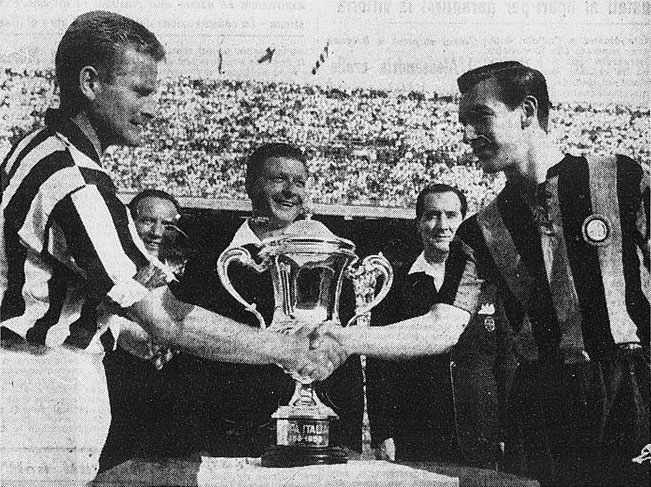
- The two captains, Juventus' Boniperti and Internazionale's Angelillo, before the kick-off.
- Event: 1958–59 Coppa Italia
Internazionale	Juventus
1	4
- Date: 13 September 1959
- Venue: San Siro, Milan
- Referee: Cesare Jonni

The 1959 Coppa Italia final was the final of the 1958–59 Coppa Italia. The match was played on 13 September 1959 between Internazionale and Juventus. Juventus won 4–1; it was their third victory.

== Match ==
13 June 1959
16:30

Internazionale	1–4	Juventus
Bicicli 36'		Charles 7'; Cervato 27', 79' (pen.); Sívori 63'

San Siro, Milan
Referee: Cesare Jonni

Internazionale	Juventus

GK	1	(Italy) Enzo Matteucci	(substituted off) 46'
DF	2	(Italy) Aristide Guarneri
DF	3	(Italy) Mauro Gatti
MF	4	(Italy) Enea Masiero
MF	5	(Italy) Amos Cardarelli
MF	6	(Italy) Bruno Bolchi
RW	7	(Italy) Mauro Bicicli
FW	8	(South Africa) (Italy) Eddie Firmani
FW	9	(Argentina) (Italy) Antonio Angelillo
FW	10	(Italy) Mario Corso
LW	11	(Italy) Eugenio Rizzolini
Substitutes:
GK		(Italy) Mario Da Pozzo	(substituted in) 46'
Manager:
(Italy) Aldo Campatelli

GK	1	(Italy) Carlo Mattrel
DF	2	(Italy) Ernesto Castano
DF	3	(Italy) Benito Sarti
MF	4	(Italy) Sergio Cervato
MF	5	(Italy) Umberto Colombo
MF	6	(Italy) Flavio Emoli
RW	7	(Italy) Bruno Nicolè
FW	8	(Italy) Giorgio Stivanello
FW	9	(Wales) John Charles
FW	10	(Argentina) (Italy) Omar Sívori
LW	11	(Italy) Giampiero Boniperti
Manager:
(Italy) Carlo Parola

== See also ==
- 1958–59 Juventus FC season
- Derby d'Italia

Played between same clubs:

- 1965 Coppa Italia final
- 2022 Coppa Italia final
