= 1965 Coppa Italia final =

17th Coppa Italia final
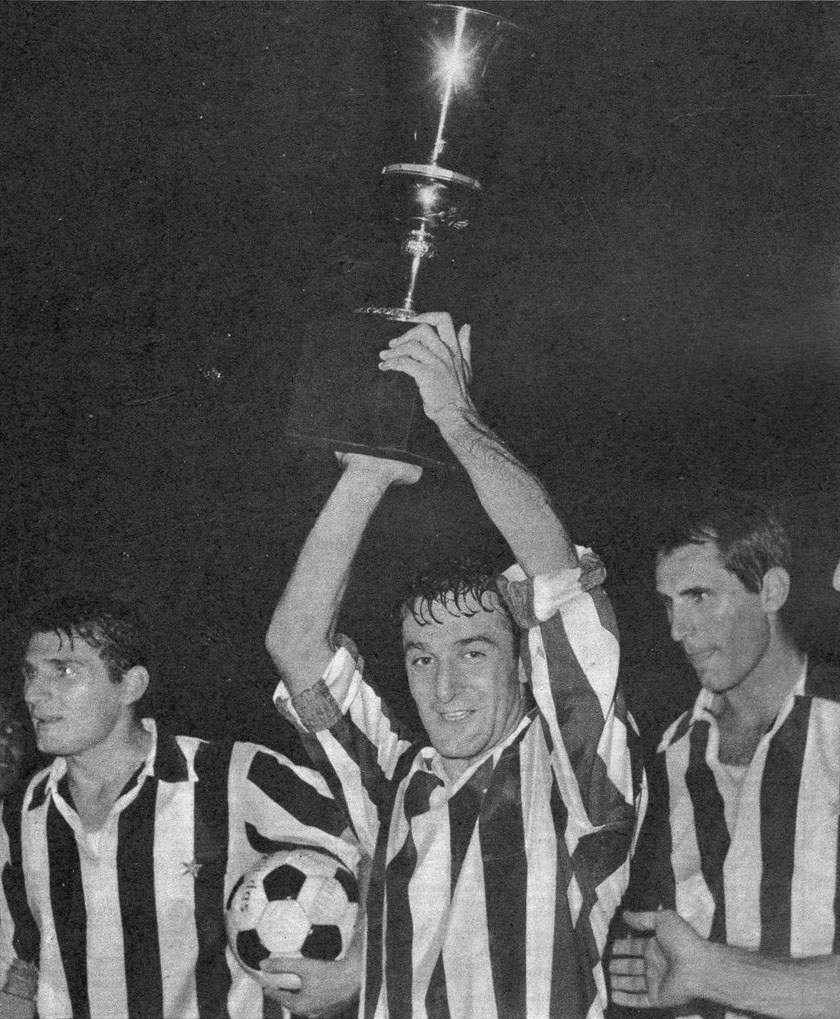
- Match winner Giampaolo Menichelli raises the trophy between Juventus teammates Leoncini (left) and Bercellino (right)
- Event: 1964–65 Coppa Italia
Juventus	Internazionale
1	0
- Date: 29 August 1965
- Venue: Stadio Olimpico, Rome
- Referee: Alessandro D'Agostini

The 1965 Coppa Italia final was the final of the 1964–65 Coppa Italia. The match was played on 29 August 1965 between Juventus and Internazionale. Juventus won 1–0; it was the fifth victory.

== Match ==
29 August 1965
21:00

Juventus	1–0	Internazionale
Menichelli 15'

Stadio Olimpico, Rome
Referee: Alessandro D'Agostini

Juventus	Internazionale

GK	1	(Italy) Roberto Anzolin
DF	2	(Italy) Giancarlo Bercellino
DF	3	(Italy) Sandro Salvadore
DF	4	(Italy) Ernesto Castano
MF	5	(Spain) Luis Del Sol	(red card) 75'
MF	6	(Italy) Adolfo Gori
MF	7	(Italy) Gianfranco Leoncini
AM	8	(Brazil) Chinesinho
FW	9	(Italy) Carlo Dell'Omodarme
FW	10	(Italy) Giampaolo Menichelli
FW	11	(Italy) Vincenzo Traspedini
Manager:
(Paraguay) Heriberto Herrera

GK	1	(Italy) Giuliano Sarti
DF	2	(Italy) Tarcisio Burgnich	(red card) 75'
DF	3	(Italy) Giacinto Facchetti
DF	4	(Italy) Aristide Guarneri
DF	5	(Italy) Armando Picchi
MF	6	(Italy) Gianfranco Bedin
MF	7	(Spain) Joaquín Peiró
RW	8	(Brazil) Jair da Costa
FW	9	(Spain) Luis Suárez
FW	10	(Italy) Sandro Mazzola
LW	11	(Italy) Mario Corso
Manager:
(Argentina) Helenio Herrera

== See also ==
- 1964–65 Inter Milan season
- Derby d'Italia

Played between same clubs:

- 1959 Coppa Italia final
- 2022 Coppa Italia final
