= 1966 Cup of the Alps =

1966 Coppa delle Alpi
Alpencup, Coupe des Alpes

Tournament details
- Country: Switzerland and Italy
- Teams: 8

Final positions
- Champions: (Italy) Napoli
- Runners-up: (Italy) Juventus

Tournament statistics
- Matches played: 16
- Goals scored: 53 (3.31 per match)

The 1966 Coppa delle Alpi shows the results of the 1966 tournament that was held as a preseason event to the 1966/67 season. The Coppa delle Alpi (translated as Cup of the Alps) was a football tournament, jointly organized by the Italian national league and the Swiss League as a pre-season event.

== Overview ==
This season the Cup of the Alps was played as a league tournament with four teams from Switzerland and four teams from Italy. Each team played four games against the teams from the other country. The teams did not play compatriots. This year there was no cup final, the league leader was the cup winner. The tournament was not held the previous year, 1965. Therefore, the defending champions would have been Genoa from the 1964 edition, but they did not compete this year.

== Matches ==
=== First round ===
4 June 1966
20:00
Round 1

Basel (Switzerland)	0 – 1	(Italy) Catania
	FCB Summary	2' (0:1) Fanello

St. Jakob Stadium, Basel
Attendance: 7,000
Referee: (Switzerland) Othmar Huber Thun

4 June 1966
20:15
Round 1

Young Boys (Switzerland)	0 – 2	(Italy) Juventus
	Juventus Summary	17' (0:1) Dell'Omodarme; 43' (0:2) Dell'Omodarme

Wankdorf Stadium, Bern
Referee: (Italy) Antonio Sbardella

4 June 1966
Round 1

Lausanne/Zürich (Switzerland)	0 – 4	(Italy) Napoli
		Goal

4 June 1966
Round 1

Spal Ferrara (Italy)	2 – 1	(Switzerland) Servette
Goal		Goal

=== Second round ===
8 June 1966
20:00
Round 2

Basel (Switzerland)	2 – 4	(Italy) Napoli
Konrad 62' (1:4); Frigerio 71' (2:4)	FCB Summary	8' (0:1) Altafini; 34' (0:2) Altafini; 51' (0:3) Altafini; 62' (0:4) Montefusco

St. Jakob Stadium, Basel
Attendance: 10,200
Referee: (Italy) Antonio Sbardella

8 June 1966
Round 2

Servette (Switzerland)	1 – 3	(Italy) Juventus
Mocallin 31' (1:2)	Juventus Summary	11' (0:1) Traspedini; 25' (0:2) Dell'Omodarme; 39' (1:3) Dell'Omodarme

Charmilles Stadium, Geneva
Referee: (Switzerland) Gilbert Droz Marin

8 June 1966
Round 2

Young Boys (Switzerland)	2 – 2	(Italy) Spal Ferrara
Goal		Goal

Wankdorf Stadium, Bern

8 June 1966
Round 2

Lausanne/Zürich (Switzerland)	1 – 0	(Italy) Catania
Goal

=== Third round ===
11 June 1966
20:00
Round 3

Basel (Switzerland)	1 – 2	(Italy) Juventus
Hauser 63' (1:0)	Summary	66' (1:1) Menichelli; 73' (1:2) Mattei

St. Jakob Stadium, Basel
Attendance: 7,600
Referee: (Italy) Ettore Carminati

11 June 1966
Round 3

Napoli (Italy)	4 – 2	(Switzerland) Young Boys
Goal		Goal

11 June 1966
Round 3

Servette (Switzerland)	0 – 0	(Italy) Catania

11 June 1966
Round 3

Lausanne/Zürich (Switzerland)	3 – 2	(Italy) Spal Ferrara
Goal		Goal

=== Fourth round ===
15 June 1965
18:15
Round 4

Basel (Switzerland)	2 – 3	(Italy) Spal Ferrara
Rickenbacher 61' (1:1); Hauser 81' (pen. 2:1)	Summary; Juventus summary	19' (0:1) Muzzio; 76' (o.g. 1:2) Pfirter; 82' (2:3) Carrera

Wankdorf Stadium, Bern
Attendance: 2,500
Referee: (Switzerland) Karl Göppel Zürich

15 June 1965
Round 4

Napoli (Italy)	3 – 1	(Switzerland) Servette
Goal		Goal

15 June 1965
Round 4

Young Boys (Switzerland)	2 – 0	(Italy) Catania
Goal

15 June 1966
Round 4

Lausanne/Zürich (Switzerland)	3 – 0 FF	(Italy) Juventus
Hertig 3' (1:0); Stürmer 20' (2:0)	Juventus summary	27' (2:1) Chinesinho; 53' (2:2) Traspedini

Referee: (Switzerland) Dittmar Huber

Note: Sport Judge decision the game was awarded 3–0, after the match was abandoned at 2–2 in the 74th minute following Juventus protest.

== Standings ==
Pos	Team	Pld	W	D	L	GF	GA	GD	Pts	Qualification
1	(Italy) Napoli	4	4	0	0	15	5	+10	8	Winner
2	(Italy) Juventus	4	3	0	1	7	5	+2	6	
3	(Switzerland) Lausanne/Zürich	4	3	0	1	7	6	+1	6	Combined team Lausanne/Zürich
4	(Italy) Spal Ferrara	4	2	1	1	9	8	+1	5	
5	(Switzerland) Young Boys	4	1	1	2	6	8	−2	3	
6	(Italy) Catania	4	1	1	2	1	3	−2	3	
7	(Switzerland) Servette	4	0	1	3	3	8	−5	1	
8	(Switzerland) Basel	4	0	0	4	5	10	−5	0	

Source: rsssf.com

== Sources and references ==
- Cup of the Alps 1966 at RSSSF
- Coppa delle Alpi 1966 at myjuve.it
- Alpencup at fcb-archiv.ch
