= Stivanello =

Stivanello is an Italian surname. Notable people with the surname include:

- Giorgio Stivanello (1932–2010), Italian footballer
- Piero Stivanello (born 1957), Italian footballer and manager, son of Giorgio
- Riccardo Stivanello (born 2004), Italian footballer
