= Paul Csonka =

Austrian composer and conductor

Paul Augustus Csonka
- Born: October 24, 1905; Austria-Hungary
- Died: November 24, 1995 (aged 90)
- Occupations: Composer, Opera conductor
- Known for: Founding the Salzburg Opera Guild, contributions to opera in Cuba and the United States
- Notable work: Concierto de Navidad, Violin Concerto, Cuban Symphony
- Children: Margarita, Paul Jr., Ariana Csonka Kaleta, Johannes
- Relatives: Arpad Csonka (father), Baroness Margarethe von Trautenegg (sister)
- Awards: Cross of Honor for Science and Art (1973); * Austrian Order of Merit for Arts & Sciences (1974)

Paul Augustus Csonka (24 October 1905 – 24 November 1995) was an Austrian composer and opera conductor.

In 1973, he was awarded the highest artistic honor the Austrian Government grants: the Cross of honor. The following year(1974), Maestro Csonka received the highest Award granted by the Austrian Republic: the Austrian Order of Merit Award for Arts & Sciences.

== Family ==
Csonka was the third-born child of Austria-Hungary's largest oil importer and Rothschild Banking partner, [Arpad Csonka]. He was also the brother of Sigmund Freud's renowned patient, Baroness Margarethe von Trautenegg.

== Biography ==
The son of a business mogul, Csonka spent most of his youth avoiding his studies at the University of Vienna and secretly conducting orchestras at the Vienna Ice Rink, local symphonies, and opera companies. It was during this period that he first befriended Herbert von Karajan, Sol Huroc, Marcel Praawy, and Sir Rudolf Bing.

Summers were spent in Brioni, Semmering, or Mattsee, enjoying the good life with the famous Austrian families of the era, including the Wittgensteins, the von Sturgkhs, and the von Ruesslers. Despite enjoying the spoils of wealth, Csonka felt compelled to work in opera and simultaneously pushed by his father (much like the Wittgenstein brothers) to enter the family business. Csonka worked for the family's companies in Vienna, Budapest and Amsterdam. It was only in his thirties that he chose to leave the world of finance and pursue his one love: music.

In 1934 Csonka founded the Salzburg Opera Guild under the supervision of Sol Hurok and with the support of Arturo Toscanini, Otto Klemperer, Stefan Zweig, Albert Schweizer, and Ernst Krenek. The Salzburg Opera Guild performed only baroque or 20th-century compositions. The guild was considered a platform of anti-fascism and anti-racism, as it consisted of performers from diverse ethnic and religious backgrounds. When Csonka had free time, he delved into composing classical music and reconstructing lost or unfinished operas such as Mozart’s The Goose of Cairo.

The Salzburg Opera Guild performed throughout Europe and the Americas. It was during a tour of the United States, with Csonka’s second wife, Herta Glatz, as one of the headliners, that the Anschluss occurred. Baptized and reared as Catholics, the Csonkas had one Jewish ancestor, a brother who was active in the French Resistance, and they were fearful of returning to Nazi-occupied Austria. The United States government accused Csonka of being a spy, so the company sought refuge in neutral countries. Csonka and his wife were able to settle in Havana, Cuba, like many other refugees of the era.

Arriving in Cuba with no funds transferable from his family in Austria and only his personality and musical knowledge to sell, Csonka used his charisma and dynamism to start building an opera company. The Opera Nacional de Havana existed before Csonka's arrival, but it was Csonka who built it to a level rivaling the European houses. As well as guest-directing the Symphonic Orchestra of Havana and the Cuba National Symphony. Csonka became a celebrity in Cuba, with his own radio broadcast and television show. Among the many performers he brought to Cuba were Plácido Domingo, Jussi Björling, Dame Elisabeth Schwarzkopf, Giuseppe Campora, Clemens Krauss and Viorica Ursuleac. Csonka also helped his friends the von Trapp family escape to America by contracting them to perform in Cuba.

In Cuba, Csonka planned and built a place for himself and his siblings. He and his third wife, soprano Margarethe "Greta" Menzel, had two children: Margarita and Paul Jr.

During this period of Csonka's life, he wrote the Concierto de Navidad, the Violin Concerto, and the Cuban Symphony, among others. In 1958, when the revolution started in Cuba, the division and occupation of Europe was fresh in Csonka's head and he had no interest in dealing with political upheaval again. After being approached by Fidel Castro in 1962 to become National Director of Music, Csonka was quoted, "To work under communism is terrible, but to work with communists is impossible". Csonka immediately informed Castro that he had been invited to conduct a concert in Miami, Florida for a weekend and would be returning shortly.

When asked to conduct a performance for Castro before leaving, Csonka contemplated concealing a pistol under his tuxedo, but, with no knowledge of guns, decided a botched assassination attempt would help no one and a successful one might do no better. He took only a small weekend suitcase and a briefcase and again left a life of wealth, with only his music and his personality, to flee again to a foreign country, aged 58.

Csonka had already spent several semesters as a professor of music at Louisiana State University and had also taught in New York. He had built up enough of an international network that upon arriving in Miami, he was offered the role of choral and assistant director of the Miami Opera. Soon, he began conducting the Miami Grand Opera, working as a professor of music at Florida Atlantic University and Florida International University, and giving private singing lessons. His name was beginning to be recognized in Florida, and he was soon honored with an honorary Doctorate of Musicology from New York University.

Marcel Prawy said "Paul Csonka could be set down on the moon, and within months they would have an opera company." Indeed, within months of his arrival in Miami, he was approached to start an opera company in Palm Beach. There, in a surprisingly provincial environment with a bare-bones budget, Csonka managed to build a world-class opera company. As one of the many fundraising ventures, he went on the '$100,000 Question' TV show, and won. In the early 1970s, he also orchestrated songs for the folk singer, Cat Stevens.

Csonka hired locals as chorus members and rented costumes from Stivanello. He used his charm and connections to bring in top artists such as Beverly Sills, Gian Carlo Menotti, Domingo, Mary Costa, Luciano Pavarotti, Robert Merrill, Anna Moffo, Licia Albanese, Roberta Peters, Barry Morell, Jean Fenn, and Giuseppe Campora.

During this period, Csonka married his fifth wife, young soprano and journalist Ariane Theslof (author of "The Young Person's Guide to the Opera"), and fathered two more children: Ariana Csonka Kaleta and Johannes.

== Compositions ==
- Concierto de Navidad, composed in 1958 (multiple recordings available)
- Concerto Cubano, composed c. 1950
- Violin Concerto Number 1 (as recorded by Henrik Sjeryng)
- Cantata de Semana Santa
- Rose Sonata Song Cycle
- French Suite
- Serenata for 'Cello and Orchestra
- Santa Lucia Variation, composed in 1955
- The Lannan Suite Ballet, composed in 1978
- The Little Prince Suite, composed 1975

== Opera Translation with Ariane Theslöf Csonka (Published by Kalmus) ==
- The Bartered Bride, by Smetana (E.F. Kalmus 1968)
- Fidelio, by Beethoven (Continuum Intl Publishing)
- Damnation of Faust, by Berlioz
- Die Fledermaus, by Strauss,
- St. John’s Passion, by Bach
- La Cenerentola, by Rossini
- Bastien und Bastienne, by Mozart
- Abduction from the Seraglio, by Mozart
- Eugene Oneigin, by Tchaikovsky
- The Elixir of Love, by Donizetti
- The Daughter of the Regiment, by Donizetti
- Falstaff, by Verdi
- Otello, by Verdi
- Merry Wives of Windsor, by Nicolai
- Goose of Cairo, by Mozart
- The Empressario, by Mozart
- Manon, by Massenet
- La Forza del Destino, by Verdi

== Reconstructions ==
The Goose of Cairo, by Wolfgang Amadeus Mozart
