= Derby d'Italia =

Football rivalry between Inter Milan and Juventus

- Inter Milan Juventus
- Other names: Derby of Italy
- Location: Northwest Italy
- First meeting: 14 November 1909; Italian Football Championship; Juventus 2–0 Inter Milan
- Latest meeting: 14 February 2026; Serie A Inter Milan 3–2 Juventus
- Stadiums: San Siro (Inter Milan); Allianz Stadium (Juventus)

Statistics
- Total meetings: Official matches: 255; Unofficial matches: 14; Total matches: 269
- Most wins: Official matches: Juventus (114); Unofficial matches: Inter Milan (6); Total matches: Juventus (118)
- Top scorer: Roberto Boninsegna; Giuseppe Meazza; Omar Sívori (12 each)
- Largest victory: Juventus 9–1 Inter Milan; Serie A (10 June 1961)

The Derby d'Italia (English: Derby of Italy) is the name of the football derby between Internazionale of Milan and Juventus of Turin. The term was coined in 1967 by Italian sports journalist Gianni Brera.

The teams are from the two biggest cities in Northern Italy. Both teams have fans across Italy, and there are numerous fan clubs of Juventus in Piedmont and Inter in Lombardy (including in the two cities).

Both clubs are among the most successful football clubs in the world.

== History ==
The matchup between Juventus and Inter is perhaps the most intense match in Italy between two teams from different cities, historically since the 1950s and 60s, and especially after the Calciopoli which saw Juventus stripped of their league title from 2005–06 and given to Inter.

After a field invasion due to the overflowing stands during a derby fixture in the 1960–61 season, Lega Calcio awarded the match to Inter but later FIGC overturned the decision and ordered a replay, much to the fury of Inter president Angelo Moratti and club supporters. Moratti accused the Italian football association of favouritism due to the Agnelli family's influence, as Umberto Agnelli was FIGC president at that time. In protest, Inter fielded their youth players for the replay and were thrashed 9–1. Juventus striker Omar Sívori scored six goals in the match and went on to win the Ballon d'Or that year, Inter only goal was scored by a young Sandro Mazzola.

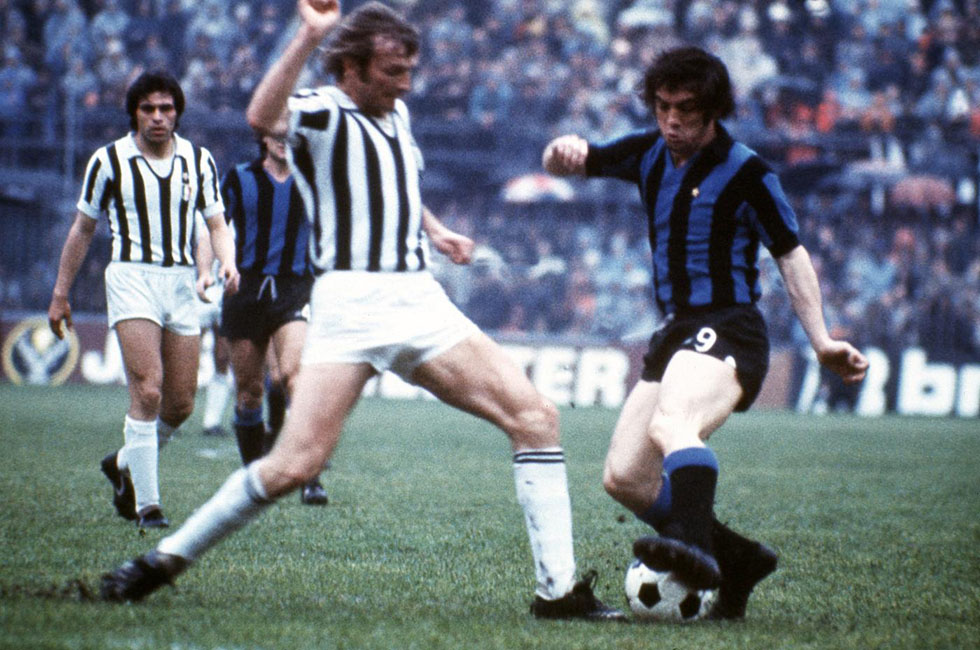
Roberto Boninsegna tackled by Francesco Morini during a derby d'Italia in 1974.

During the 1997–98 fixture at the Stadio delle Alpi there was controversy over referee Piero Ceccarini's decisions, in particular not to award a penalty for Mark Iuliano's foul on Inter forward Ronaldo in the direct clash between the two teams decisive for the title with Inter behind only 1 point with 4 games left. Juventus, up 1–0 at the time of the incident, were after few seconds awarded a penalty which was missed by Alessandro Del Piero; Juventus won the game 1–0 and with this secured the scudetto with five points ahead. The incident caused heated arguments in the Italian parliament during a publicly broadcast "question time" session in April 1998. Domenico Gramazio of the National Alliance reportedly shouted "They are all thieves!" at fellow politician and former Juventus player Massimo Mauro of the ruling Democrats of the Left, prompting Chamber of Deputies member and then-Deputy Prime Minister Walter Veltroni to comment, "We are not at a stadium. This is a spectacle that is unworthy, embarrassing and grotesque...". The session had to be suspended and several politicians were later penalised as a result.

During the days leading up to the derby on 5 December 2009 in Turin, there were fears about the Juventus ultras abusing Inter's Italian striker Mario Balotelli (who is of Ghanaian descent) due to a history of racial abuse from fans. Juventus chairman Jean-Claude Blanc and Mirella Scirea, widow of Juventus legend Gaetano Scirea, wrote to the ultra groups and publicly urged fans to refrain from using racist chants. When Inter's players arrived in Turin, the team bus was pelted with eggs by some Juventus fans. The match itself was marred by seven bookings, a red card and a number of heated on-pitch altercations, in particular between Juve goalkeeper Gianluigi Buffon and Inter midfielder Thiago Motta. Inter manager José Mourinho was dismissed in the first half for arguing with the referee. A second-half winner from Claudio Marchisio re-opened the Scudetto race as Inter's lead was cut to five points.

Juventus and Inter were matched up for the semi-final of the 2015–16 Coppa Italia, where Juventus won the opening leg 3–0 at home in Turin on 27 January 2016. In the return leg on 3 March 2016, Inter won 3–0 in Milan at home to tie 3–3 on aggregate and force a penalty shoot-out, which Juventus ultimately won 5–3 to move on to the final.

== Official match results ==
Dates are in dd/mm/yyyy form.

- SF = Semi-finals
- QF = Quarter-finals
- R16 = Round of 16
- R32 = Round of 32
- GS = Group stage
- R1 = Round 1
- R2 = Round 2

Juventus win Draw Inter win

Season	Competition	Date	Home team	Result	Away team
1909–10	Prima Categoria	14 Nov 1909	Juventus	2–0	Inter
1909–10	Prima Categoria	28 Nov 1909	Inter	1–0	Juventus
1910–11	Prima Categoria	12 Mar 1911	Inter	1–1	Juventus
1910–11	Prima Categoria	28 May 1911	Juventus	0–2	Inter
1911–12	Prima Categoria	26 Nov 1911	Inter	6–1	Juventus
1911–12	Prima Categoria	11 Feb 1912	Juventus	0–4	Inter
1913–14	Prima Categoria	14 Dec 1913	Juventus	7–2	Inter
1913–14	Prima Categoria	4 Jan 1914	Inter	6–1	Juventus
1913–14	Prima Categoria	22 Mar 1914	Juventus	1–0	Inter
1913–14	Prima Categoria	17 May 1914	Inter	2–2	Juventus
1919–20	Prima Categoria	23 May 1920	Juventus	0–1	Inter
1923–24	Prima Divisione	7 Oct 1923	Juventus	2–0	Inter
1923–24	Prima Divisione	20 Apr 1924	Inter	2–2	Juventus
1926–27	Divisione Nazionale	7 Nov 1926	Juventus	4–1	Inter
1926–27	Divisione Nazionale	6 Feb 1927	Inter	3–0	Juventus
1926–27	Divisione Nazionale	10 Apr 1927	Inter	2–1	Juventus
1926–27	Divisione Nazionale	26 Jun 1927	Juventus	1–3	Inter
1927–28	Divisione Nazionale	12 Aug 1927	Juventus	1–1	Inter
1927–28	Divisione Nazionale	26 Feb 1928	Inter	1–0	Juventus
1927–28	Divisione Nazionale	17 May 1928	Inter	1–4	Juventus
1927–28	Divisione Nazionale	22 Jul 1928	Juventus	1–0	Inter
1928–29	Divisione Nazionale	25 Nov 1928	Juventus	0–0	Inter
1928–29	Divisione Nazionale	21 Apr 1929	Inter	4–2	Juventus
1928–29	Mitropa Cup play-off	30 May 1929	Juventus	1–0	Inter
1929–30	Serie A	19 Mar 1930	Juventus	1–2	Inter
1929–30	Serie A	29 Jun 1930	Inter	2–0	Juventus
1930–31	Serie A	18 Jan 1931	Inter	2–3	Juventus
1930–31	Serie A	21 Jun 1931	Juventus	1–0	Inter
1931–32	Serie A	17 Jan 1932	Juventus	6–2	Inter
1931–32	Serie A	5 Jun 1932	Inter	2–4	Juventus
1932–33	Serie A	18 Dec 1932	Juventus	3–0	Inter
1932–33	Serie A	25 May 1933	Inter	2–2	Juventus
1933–34	Serie A	12 Nov 1933	Inter	3–2	Juventus
1933–34	Serie A	1 Apr 1934	Juventus	0–0	Inter
1934–35	Serie A	18 Nov 1934	Juventus	1–0	Inter
1934–35	Serie A	31 Mar 1935	Inter	0–0	Juventus
1935–36	Serie A	17 Nov 1935	Inter	4–0	Juventus
1935–36	Serie A	15 Mar 1936	Juventus	1–0	Inter
1935–36	Coppa Italia R16	21 May 1936	Inter	0–1	Juventus
1936–37	Serie A	18 Oct 1936	Juventus	1–1	Inter
1936–37	Serie A	21 Feb 1937	Inter	2–0	Juventus
1937–38	Serie A	14 Nov 1937	Inter	2–1	Juventus
1937–38	Serie A	13 Mar 1938	Juventus	2–1	Inter
1937–38	Coppa Italia SF	21 Apr 1938	Juventus	2–0	Inter
1938–39	Serie A	16 Oct 1938	Inter	5–0	Juventus
1938–39	Serie A	26 Feb 1939	Juventus	0–0	Inter
1939–40	Serie A	17 Sep 1939	Inter	4–0	Juventus
1939–40	Serie A	21 Jan 1940	Juventus	1–0	Inter
1940–41	Serie A	10 Nov 1940	Inter	2–1	Juventus
1940–41	Serie A	2 Mar 1941	Juventus	2–0	Inter
1940–41	Coppa Italia R32	11 May 1941	Inter	0–2	Juventus
1941–42	Serie A	4 Jan 1942	Inter	4–1	Juventus
1941–42	Serie A	17 May 1942	Juventus	4–0	Inter
1942–43	Serie A	29 Nov 1942	Juventus	4–2	Inter
1942–43	Serie A	14 Mar 1943	Inter	3–1	Juventus
1944	Campionato Alta Italia	28 May 1944	Inter	2–1	Juventus
1944	Campionato Alta Italia	11 Jun 1944	Juventus	1–0	Inter
1945–46	Serie A-B	18 Nov 1945	Inter	2–2	Juventus
1945–46	Serie A-B	17 Feb 1946	Juventus	0–0	Inter
1945–46	Serie A-B	5 May 1946	Inter	1–0	Juventus
1945–46	Serie A-B	23 Jun 1946	Juventus	1–0	Inter
1946–47	Serie A	15 Dec 1946	Juventus	4–1	Inter
1946–47	Serie A	18 May 1947	Inter	0–0	Juventus
1947–48	Serie A	12 Oct 1947	Inter	4–2	Juventus
1947–48	Serie A	14 Mar 1948	Juventus	2–0	Inter
1948–49	Serie A	4 Nov 1948	Juventus	0–1	Inter
1948–49	Serie A	6 Mar 1949	Inter	1–1	Juventus
1949–50	Serie A	13 Nov 1949	Juventus	3–2	Inter
1949–50	Serie A	26 Mar 1950	Inter	2–4	Juventus
1950–51	Serie A	3 Dec 1950	Inter	3–0	Juventus
1950–51	Serie A	22 Apr 1951	Juventus	0–2	Inter
1951–52	Serie A	6 Jan 1952	Juventus	3–2	Inter
1951–52	Serie A	1 Jun 1952	Inter	3–2	Juventus
1952–53	Serie A	4 Jan 1953	Inter	2–0	Juventus
1952–53	Serie A	10 May 1953	Juventus	2–1	Inter
1953–54	Serie A	22 Nov 1953	Juventus	2–2	Inter
1953–54	Serie A	4 Apr 1954	Inter	6–0	Juventus
1954–55	Serie A	12 Dec 1954	Inter	1–2	Juventus
1954–55	Serie A	24 Apr 1955	Juventus	3–2	Inter
1955–56	Serie A	8 Jan 1956	Juventus	1–0	Inter
1955–56	Serie A	13 May 1956	Inter	0–2	Juventus
1956–57	Serie A	14 Oct 1956	Inter	1–1	Juventus
1956–57	Serie A	3 Mar 1957	Juventus	5–1	Inter
1957–58	Serie A	27 Oct 1957	Juventus	3–1	Inter
1957–58	Serie A	16 Mar 1958	Inter	2–2	Juventus
1958–59	Serie A	18 Dec 1958	Inter	1–3	Juventus
1958–59	Serie A	19 Apr 1959	Juventus	3–2	Inter
1958–59	Coppa Italia Final	13 Sep 1959	Inter	1–4	Juventus
1959–60	Serie A	13 Dec 1959	Juventus	1–0	Inter
1959–60	Serie A	24 Apr 1960	Inter	0–3	Juventus
1960–61	Serie A	18 Dec 1960	Inter	3–1	Juventus
1960–61	Serie A	10 Jun 1961	Juventus	9–1	Inter
1961–62	Serie A	22 Oct 1961	Juventus	2–4	Inter
1961–62	Serie A	25 Feb 1962	Inter	2–2	Juventus
1962–63	Serie A	23 Dec 1962	Inter	1–0	Juventus
1962–63	Serie A	28 Apr 1963	Juventus	0–1	Inter
1963–64	Serie A	22 Dec 1963	Juventus	4–1	Inter
1963–64	Serie A	3 May 1964	Inter	1–0	Juventus
1964–65	Serie A	27 Dec 1964	Inter	1–1	Juventus
1964–65	Serie A	16 May 1965	Juventus	0–2	Inter
1964–65	Coppa Italia Final	29 Aug 1965	Juventus	1–0	Inter
1965–66	Serie A	2 Jan 1966	Juventus	0–0	Inter
1965–66	Serie A	8 May 1966	Inter	3–1	Juventus
1966–67	Serie A	31 Dec 1966	Inter	1–1	Juventus
1966–67	Serie A	7 May 1967	Juventus	1–0	Inter
1967–68	Serie A	31 Dec 1967	Juventus	3–2	Inter
1967–68	Serie A	28 Apr 1968	Inter	0–0	Juventus
1968–69	Serie A	12 Jan 1969	Inter	1–2	Juventus
1968–69	Serie A	4 May 1969	Juventus	1–0	Inter
1969–70	Serie A	26 Oct 1969	Juventus	2–1	Inter
1969–70	Serie A	1 Mar 1970	Inter	0–0	Juventus
1970–71	Serie A	27 Dec 1970	Inter	2–0	Juventus
1970–71	Serie A	18 Apr 1971	Juventus	1–1	Inter
1970–71	Trofeo Picchi	19 Jun 1971	Inter	3–1	Juventus
1971–72	Serie A	2 Jan 1972	Inter	0–0	Juventus
1971–72	Serie A	23 Apr 1972	Juventus	3–0	Inter
1971–72	Coppa Italia R2	4 Jun 1972	Inter	3–1	Juventus
1971–72	Coppa Italia R2	25 Jun 1972	Juventus	2–1	Inter
1972–73	Serie A	7 Jan 1973	Inter	0–2	Juventus
1972–73	Serie A	13 May 1973	Juventus	2–1	Inter
1972–73	Coppa Italia R2	17 Jun 1973	Inter	1–1	Juventus
1972–73	Coppa Italia R2	27 Jun 1973	Juventus	4–2	Inter
1973–74	Serie A	6 Jan 1974	Juventus	2–0	Inter
1973–74	Serie A	28 Apr 1974	Inter	0–2	Juventus
1974–75	Serie A	1 Dec 1974	Inter	0–1	Juventus
1974–75	Serie A	23 Mar 1975	Juventus	1–0	Inter
1974–75	Coppa Italia R2	29 May 1975	Juventus	1–2	Inter
1974–75	Coppa Italia R2	19 Jun 1975	Inter	2–6	Juventus
1975–76	Coppa Italia R1	31 Aug 1975	Inter	1–0	Juventus
1975–76	Serie A	14 Dec 1975	Juventus	2–0	Inter
1975–76	Serie A	4 Apr 1976	Inter	1–0	Juventus

Season	Competition	Date	Home team	Result	Away team
1976–77	Serie A	16 Jan 1977	Juventus	2–0	Inter
1976–77	Serie A	8 May 1977	Inter	0–2	Juventus
1976–77	Coppa Italia R2	12 Jun 1977	Juventus	0–1	Inter
1976–77	Coppa Italia R2	19 Jun 1977	Inter	1–0	Juventus
1977–78	Serie A	18 Dec 1977	Inter	0–1	Juventus
1977–78	Serie A	8 Apr 1978	Juventus	2–2	Inter
1978–79	Serie A	10 Dec 1978	Juventus	1–1	Inter
1978–79	Serie A	14 Apr 1979	Inter	2–1	Juventus
1978–79	Coppa Italia QF	25 Apr 1979	Juventus	3–1	Inter
1978–79	Coppa Italia QF	9 May 1979	Inter	1–0	Juventus
1979–80	Serie A	11 Nov 1979	Inter	4–0	Juventus
1979–80	Coppa Italia QF	28 Nov 1979	Inter	1–2	Juventus
1979–80	Coppa Italia QF	30 Jan 1980	Juventus	0–0	Inter
1979–80	Serie A	23 Mar 1980	Juventus	2–0	Inter
1980–81	Serie A	23 Nov 1980	Juventus	2–1	Inter
1980–81	Serie A	29 Mar 1981	Inter	1–0	Juventus
1981–82	Serie A	20 Dec 1981	Inter	0–0	Juventus
1981–82	Serie A	25 Apr 1982	Juventus	1–0	Inter
1982–83	Serie A	19 Dec 1982	Inter	0–0	Juventus
1982–83	Serie A	1 May 1983	Juventus	0–2	Inter
1982–83	Coppa Italia SF	11 Jun 1983	Juventus	2–1	Inter
1982–83	Coppa Italia SF	15 Jun 1983	Inter	0–0	Juventus
1983–84	Serie A	18 Dec 1983	Juventus	2–0	Inter
1983–84	Serie A	29 Apr 1984	Inter	1–2	Juventus
1984–85	Serie A	11 Nov 1984	Inter	4–0	Juventus
1984–85	Serie A	24 Mar 1985	Juventus	3–1	Inter
1985–86	Serie A	24 Nov 1985	Inter	1–1	Juventus
1985–86	Serie A	23 Mar 1986	Juventus	2–0	Inter
1986–87	Serie A	26 Oct 1986	Juventus	1–1	Inter
1986–87	Serie A	15 Mar 1987	Inter	2–1	Juventus
1987–88	Serie A	25 Oct 1987	Inter	2–1	Juventus
1987–88	Serie A	6 Mar 1988	Juventus	1–0	Inter
1988–89	Serie A	18 Dec 1988	Inter	1–1	Juventus
1988–89	Serie A	7 May 1989	Juventus	1–1	Inter
1989–90	Serie A	17 Sep 1989	Inter	2–1	Juventus
1989–90	Serie A	28 Jan 1990	Juventus	1–0	Inter
1990–91	Serie A	28 Oct 1990	Juventus	4–2	Inter
1990–91	Serie A	10 Mar 1991	Inter	2–0	Juventus
1991–92	Serie A	8 Dec 1991	Juventus	2–1	Inter
1991–92	Coppa Italia QF	12 Feb 1992	Juventus	1–0	Inter
1991–92	Coppa Italia QF	26 Feb 1992	Inter	1–2 (Note: Juventus won 2–1 in extra time after both teams tied 1–1 on aggregate.)	Juventus
1991–92	Serie A	26 Apr 1992	Inter	1–3	Juventus
1992–93	Serie A	25 Oct 1992	Inter	3–1	Juventus
1992–93	Serie A	21 Mar 1993	Juventus	0–2	Inter
1993–94	Serie A	28 Nov 1993	Inter	2–2	Juventus
1993–94	Serie A	2 Apr 1994	Juventus	1–0	Inter
1994–95	Serie A	2 Oct 1994	Juventus	0–0	Inter
1994–95	Serie A	5 Mar 1995	Inter	0–0	Juventus
1995–96	Serie A	17 Dec 1995	Juventus	1–0	Inter
1995–96	Serie A	20 Apr 1996	Inter	1–2	Juventus
1996–97	Serie A	20 Oct 1996	Juventus	2–0	Inter
1996–97	Coppa Italia QF	13 Nov 1996	Juventus	0–3	Inter
1996–97	Coppa Italia QF	18 Dec 1996	Inter	1–1	Juventus
1996–97	Serie A	9 Mar 1997	Inter	0–0	Juventus
1997–98	Serie A	4 Jan 1998	Inter	1–0	Juventus
1997–98	Serie A	26 Apr 1998	Juventus	1–0	Inter
1998–99	Serie A	25 Oct 1998	Juventus	1–0	Inter
1998–99	Serie A	27 Feb 1999	Inter	0–0	Juventus
1999–2000	Serie A	12 Dec 1999	Juventus	1–0	Inter
1999–2000	Serie A	16 Apr 2000	Inter	1–2	Juventus
2000–01	Serie A	3 Dec 2000	Inter	2–2	Juventus
2000–01	Serie A	14 Apr 2001	Juventus	3–1	Inter
2001–02	Serie A	27 Oct 2001	Juventus	0–0	Inter
2001–02	Serie A	9 Mar 2002	Inter	2–2	Juventus
2002–03	Serie A	19 Oct 2002	Inter	1–1	Juventus
2002–03	Serie A	2 Mar 2003	Juventus	3–0	Inter
2003–04	Serie A	29 Nov 2003	Juventus	1–3	Inter
2003–04	Coppa Italia SF	4 Feb 2004	Juventus	2–2	Inter
2003–04	Coppa Italia SF	12 Feb 2004	Inter	2–2 (Note: Juventus won 7–6 on penalties after both teams tied 4–4 on aggregate.)	Juventus
2003–04	Serie A	4 Apr 2004	Inter	3–2	Juventus
2004–05	Serie A	28 Nov 2004	Inter	2–2	Juventus
2004–05	Serie A	20 Apr 2005	Juventus	0–1	Inter
2005–06	Supercoppa Italiana	20 Aug 2005	Juventus	0–1 (Note: Inter won after extra time.)	Inter
2005–06	Serie A	2 Oct 2005	Juventus	2–0	Inter
2005–06	Serie A	12 Feb 2006	Inter	1–2	Juventus
2007–08	Serie A	4 Nov 2007	Juventus	1–1	Inter
2007–08	Coppa Italia QF	23 Jan 2008	Inter	2–2	Juventus
2007–08	Coppa Italia QF	30 Jan 2008	Juventus	2–3	Inter
2007–08	Serie A	22 Mar 2008	Inter	1–2	Juventus
2008–09	Serie A	22 Nov 2008	Inter	1–0	Juventus
2008–09	Serie A	18 Apr 2009	Juventus	1–1	Inter
2009–10	Serie A	5 Dec 2009	Juventus	2–1	Inter
2009–10	Coppa Italia QF	28 Jan 2010	Inter	2–1	Juventus
2009–10	Serie A	16 Apr 2010	Inter	2–0	Juventus
2010–11	Serie A	3 Oct 2010	Inter	0–0	Juventus
2010–11	Serie A	13 Feb 2011	Juventus	1–0	Inter
2011–12	Serie A	29 Oct 2011	Inter	1–2	Juventus
2011–12	Serie A	25 Mar 2012	Juventus	2–0	Inter
2012–13	Serie A	3 Nov 2012	Juventus	1–3	Inter
2012–13	Serie A	30 Mar 2013	Inter	1–2	Juventus
2013–14	Serie A	14 Sep 2013	Inter	1–1	Juventus
2013–14	Serie A	2 Feb 2014	Juventus	3–1	Inter
2014–15	Serie A	6 Jan 2015	Juventus	1–1	Inter
2014–15	Serie A	16 May 2015	Inter	1–2	Juventus
2015–16	Serie A	18 Oct 2015	Inter	0–0	Juventus
2015–16	Coppa Italia SF	27 Jan 2016	Juventus	3–0	Inter
2015–16	Serie A	28 Feb 2016	Juventus	2–0	Inter
2015–16	Coppa Italia SF	2 Mar 2016	Inter	3–0 (Note: Juventus won 5–3 on penalties after both teams tied 3–3 on aggregate.)	Juventus
2016–17	Serie A	18 Sep 2016	Inter	2–1	Juventus
2016–17	Serie A	5 Feb 2017	Juventus	1–0	Inter
2017–18	Serie A	9 Dec 2017	Juventus	0–0	Inter
2017–18	Serie A	28 Apr 2018	Inter	2–3	Juventus
2018–19	Serie A	7 Dec 2018	Juventus	1–0	Inter
2018–19	Serie A	27 Apr 2019	Inter	1–1	Juventus
2019–20	Serie A	6 Oct 2019	Inter	1–2	Juventus
2019–20	Serie A	8 Mar 2020	Juventus	2–0	Inter
2020–21	Serie A	17 Jan 2021	Inter	2–0	Juventus
2020–21	Coppa Italia SF	2 Feb 2021	Inter	1–2	Juventus
2020–21	Coppa Italia SF	9 Feb 2021	Juventus	0–0	Inter
2020–21	Serie A	15 May 2021	Juventus	3–2	Inter
2021–22	Serie A	24 Oct 2021	Inter	1–1	Juventus
2021–22	Supercoppa Italiana	12 Jan 2022	Inter	2–1	Juventus
2021–22	Serie A	3 Apr 2022	Juventus	0–1	Inter
2021–22	Coppa Italia Final	11 May 2022	Juventus	2–4	Inter
2022–23	Serie A	6 Nov 2022	Juventus	2–0	Inter
2022–23	Serie A	19 Mar 2023	Inter	0–1	Juventus
2022–23	Coppa Italia SF	4 Apr 2023	Juventus	1–1	Inter
2022–23	Coppa Italia SF	26 Apr 2023	Inter	1–0	Juventus
2023–24	Serie A	26 Nov 2023	Juventus	1–1	Inter
2023–24	Serie A	4 Feb 2024	Inter	1–0	Juventus
2024–25	Serie A	27 Oct 2024	Inter	4–4	Juventus
2024–25	Serie A	16 Feb 2025	Juventus	1–0	Inter
2025–26	Serie A	13 Sep 2025	Juventus	4–3	Inter
2025–26	Serie A	14 Feb 2026	Inter	3–2	Juventus
2026–27	Serie A	9 Jan 2027	Inter		Juventus
2026–27	Serie A	15 May 2027	Juventus		Inter

== Statistics ==
As of 14 February 2026

Competition	Matches	Juventus wins	Draws	Inter wins	Juventus goals	Inter goals
Prima Categoria	11	3	2	6	15	25
Prima Divisione	2	1	1	0	4	2
Divisione Nazionale	14	4	4	6	17	19
Serie A	186	89	47	50	270	219
Total league matches	213	97	54	62	306	265
1944 Campionato Alta Italia	2	1	0	1	2	2
Coppa Italia	36	15	9	12	53	45
Supercoppa Italiana	2	0	0	2	1	3
Mitropa Cup (play-off)	1	1	0	0	1	0
Trofeo Picchi	1	0	0	1	1	3
Total official matches	255	114	63	78	364	318
Coppa Pagani	1	0	0	1	0	1
Palla d'oro Moët et Chandon	1	1	0	0	2	1
Trofeo Radice	1	0	0	1	0	3
Trofeo Ansbacher	1	0	0	1	2	8
Trofeo Caimi	5	1	2	2	8	13
Torneo Città di Torino	1	1	0	0	3	1
Torneo Città di Milano	1	0	0	1	1	3
Coppa Super Clubs	1	1	0	0	1	0
International Champions Cup	2	0	2	0	2	2
Total matches	269	118	67	84	383	350

=== Records ===
==== Most goals in a match ====
- 10 goals on 10 June 1961, Juventus 9–1 Inter
- 9 goals on 14 December 1913, Juventus 7–2 Inter
- 8 goals on 17 January 1932, Juventus 6–2 Inter
- 8 goals on 19 June 1975, Inter 2–6 Juventus
- 8 goals on 27 October 2024, Inter 4–4 Juventus
- 7 goals on 26 November 1911, Inter 6–1 Juventus
- 7 goals on 4 January 1914, Inter 6–1 Juventus
- 7 goals on 13 September 2025, Juventus 4–3 Inter

==== Inter biggest wins ====
* Four or more goals difference, OR Inter scored five or above

- Inter 6–1 Juventus on 26 November 1911
- Juventus 0–4 Inter on 11 February 1912
- Inter 6–1 Juventus on 4 January 1914
- Inter 4–0 Juventus on 17 November 1935
- Inter 5–0 Juventus on 16 October 1938
- Inter 4–0 Juventus on 17 September 1939
- Inter 6–0 Juventus on 4 April 1954
- Inter 4–0 Juventus on 11 November 1979
- Inter 4–0 Juventus on 11 November 1984

==== Juventus biggest wins ====
* Four or more goals difference, OR Juventus scored five or above

- Juventus 7–2 Inter on 14 December 1913
- Juventus 6–2 Inter on 17 January 1932
- Juventus 4–0 Inter on 17 May 1942
- Juventus 5–1 Inter on 3 March 1957
- Juventus 9–1 Inter on 10 June 1961
- Inter 2–6 Juventus on 19 June 1975

=== Top scorers ===
Below is the list of players with the most goals scored in official games. As of 14 February 2026.

Rank	Player	Team(s) (goals)	Goals
1	(Argentina) (Italy) Omar Sívori	Juventus	13
2	(Italy) Roberto Boninsegna	Inter (9); Juventus (3)	12
2	(Italy) Giuseppe Meazza	Inter (10); Juventus (2)	12
4	(Italy) Pietro Anastasi	Juventus	9
4	(Italy) Alessandro Del Piero	Juventus	9
6	(Italy) Luigi Cevenini	Inter	8
6	(Italy) Benito Lorenzi	Inter	8
8	(Italy) Alessandro Altobelli	Inter	7
8	(Italy) Roberto Baggio	Juventus	7
8	(Italy) Giampiero Boniperti	Juventus	7
8	(Wales) John Charles	Juventus	7
8	(Argentina) Julio Cruz	Inter	7
8	(Italy) Giovanni Ferrari	Juventus (5); Inter (2)	7
14	(Italy) Ermanno Aebi	Inter	6
14	(Italy) Franco Causio	Juventus	6
14	(Denmark) John Hansen	Juventus	6
14	(Italy) Sandro Mazzola	Inter	6
14	(Italy) Federico Munerati	Juventus	6
14	(Hungary) István Nyers	Inter	6
14	(Italy) Enrico Rivolta	Inter	6

=== Most appearances ===
Below is the list of players with the most appearances in official games. As of 14 February 2026.

Rank	Player	Team(s) (apps)	Apps
1	(Italy) Giacinto Facchetti	Inter	39
1	(Argentina) Javier Zanetti	Inter	39
3	(Italy) Sandro Mazzola	Inter	38
4	(Italy) Giuseppe Bergomi	Inter	37
5	(Italy) Franco Causio	Juventus (35); Inter (1)	36
5	(Italy) Giuseppe Furino	Juventus	36
7	(Italy) Giuseppe Baresi	Inter	35
7	(Italy) Gaetano Scirea	Juventus	35
9	(Italy) Giorgio Chiellini	Juventus	33
9	(Italy) Mario Corso	Inter	33
11	(Italy) Dino Zoff	Juventus	32
12	(Italy) Antonello Cuccureddu	Juventus	31
12	(Italy) Alessandro Del Piero	Juventus	31
14	(Italy) Roberto Bettega	Juventus	30
14	(Italy) Tarcisio Burgnich	Juventus (1); Inter (29)	30

=== Managers ===
Below is the list of managers with the most appearances in official games. As of 14 February 2026.

==== Appearances ====
Rank	Manager	Team(s) (apps)	Apps
1	(Italy) Giovanni Trapattoni	Juventus (36); Inter (10)	46
2	(Italy) Massimiliano Allegri	Juventus	22
3	(Italy) Marcello Lippi	Juventus (19); Inter (2)	21
4	(Argentina) Helenio Herrera	Inter	18
5	(Hungary) Árpád Weisz	Inter	16
6	(Italy) Roberto Mancini	Inter	15
7	(Italy) Eugenio Bersellini	Inter	14
7	(Italy) Carlo Carcano	Juventus (9); Inter (5)	14
9	(Italy) Carlo Parola	Juventus	13
9	(Paraguay) Heriberto Herrera	Juventus (11); Inter (2)	13

== Head-to-head ranking in Serie A (1930–2026) ==
P.	30	31	32	33	34	35	36	37	38	39	40	41	42	43	47	48	49	50	51	52	53	54	55	56	57	58	59	60	61	62	63	64	65	66	67	68	69	70	71	72	73	74	75	76	77	78	79	80	81	82	83	84	85	86	87	88	89	90	91	92	93	94	95	96	97	98	99	00	01	02	03	04	05	06	07	08	09	10	11	12	13	14	15	16	17	18	19	20	21	22	23	24	25	26
1	1	1	1	1	1	1			1		1							1		1	1	1				1		1	1		1		1	1	1				1	1	1		1		1	1		1	1	1		1		1			1						1		1	1				1	1		1	1	1	1	1	1		1	1	1	1	1	1	1	1	1	1			1		1
2				2	2	2			2			2			2	2	2		2		2	2								2	2	2			2			2				2		2				2			2				2					2	2	2		2		2		2	2		2						2		2									2		2			2	
3	3									3	3			3				3	3	3				3			3		3							3		3									3				3		3		3			3	3						3					3		3	3			3															3	3		
4							4							4			4										4	4				4	4				4		4			4		4	4		4		4			4					4	4			4							4				4												4		4	4		4	4			4	
5		5					5	5				5													5									5		5	5			5	5					5				5						5													5													5												
6			6										6																																								6	6		6							6																	6														6
7								7															7																																				7					7			7											7	7						7						7			
8										8													8																																					8							8																8											
9																								9	9	9																	9																																						9													
10															10																																																																															
11																																																																																														
12													12			12														12																																																																
13																																																														13																																
14																																																																																														
15																																																																																														
16																																																																																														
17																																																																																														
18																																																																																														
19																																																																																														
20																																																																										20																				

• Total: Juventus with 54 higher finishes, Inter with 39 higher finishes (as of the end of the 2025–26 season). No head-to-head in 2007, since Juventus was in Serie B.

Notes:

- 1945–46 Italian Football Championship is not included in Serie A statistics.
- Both teams finished with the same number of points in 1990, but Inter had better goal difference: Inter finished in third place, Juventus in fourth.
- Due to the Calciopoli scandal, Juventus' 2004–05 title was voided, while in the 2005–06 season Juventus was relegated and the title was awarded to Inter.

== Trophies ==
As of 13 May 2026

- Numbers with this background denote the competition record.

Juventus	Competition	Inter
Domestic
36	Serie A	21
15	Coppa Italia	10
9	Supercoppa Italiana	8
60	Domestic total	39
International
2	UEFA Champions League	3
1	UEFA Cup Winners' Cup (defunct)	—
3	UEFA Europa League/UEFA Cup	3
2	UEFA Super Cup	—
1	UEFA Intertoto Cup (defunct)	—
2	Intercontinental Cup (defunct)	2
—	FIFA Club World Cup	1
11	International total	9
71	Grand total	48
