= 2022 Coppa Italia final =

74th Coppa Italia final
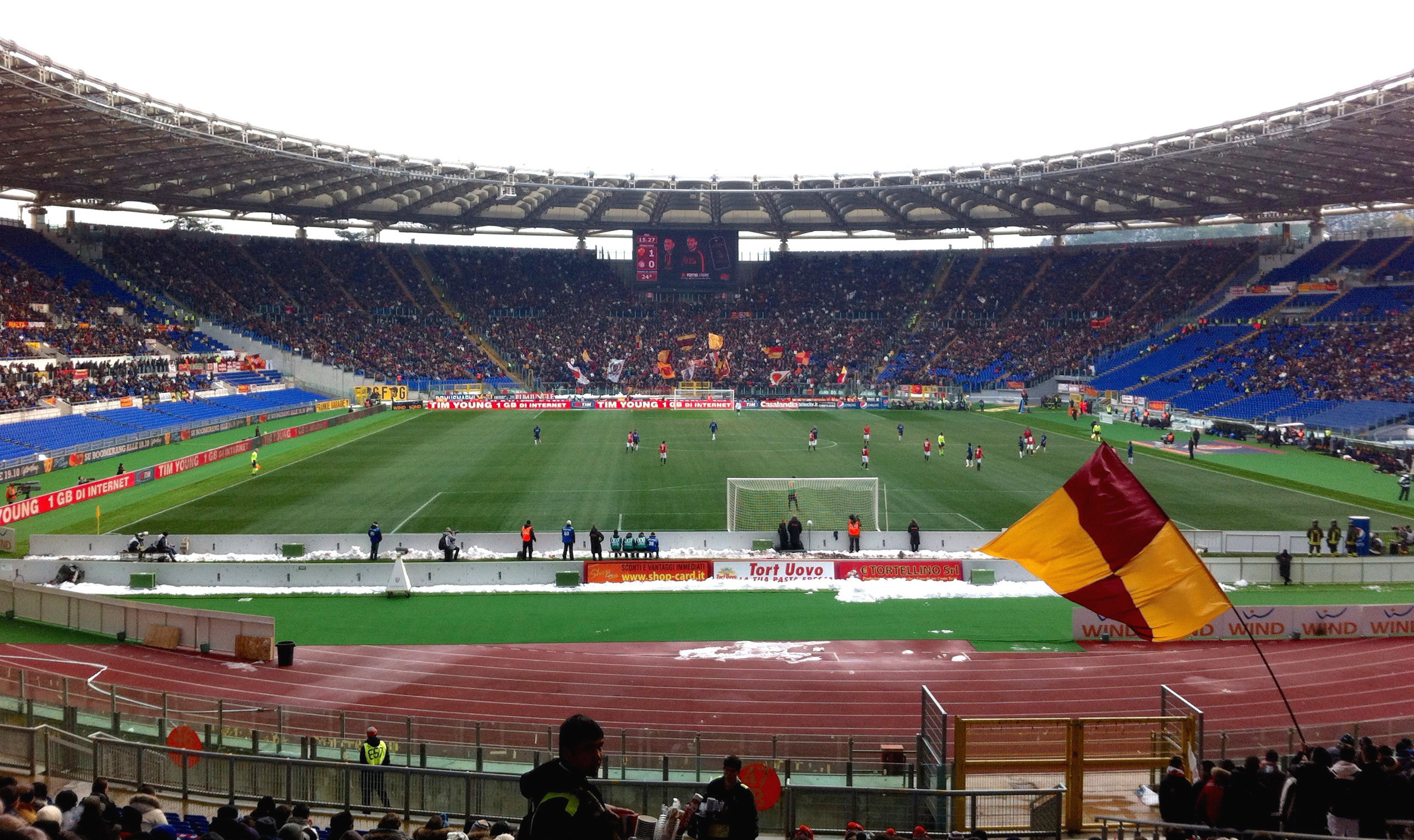
- The Stadio Olimpico in Rome hosted the final.
- Event: 2021–22 Coppa Italia
Juventus	Internazionale
2	4
- After extra time
- Date: 11 May 2022
- Venue: Stadio Olimpico, Rome
- Man of the Match: Ivan Perišić (Internazionale)
- Referee: Paolo Valeri
- Attendance: 67,944

The 2022 Coppa Italia final decided the winners of the 2021–22 Coppa Italia, Italy's premier football cup, the Coppa Italia. It was played on 11 May 2022 between Juventus and Internazionale.

Internazionale won the match 4–2 after extra time for their eighth Coppa Italia title. As winners, they qualified for the 2022 Supercoppa Italiana against the champions of the 2021–22 Serie A.

== Background ==
This was the third Derby d'Italia in a Coppa Italia final, after 1959 and 1965, both won by Juventus. This was the fourth derby of the 2021–22 season, with one league draw and two wins for Internazionale, including the 2021 Supercoppa Italiana.

== Road to the final ==
Note: In all results below, the score of the finalist is given first (H: home; A: away).

Juventus		Round	Internazionale
Opponent	Result	2021–22 Coppa Italia	Opponent	Result
Sampdoria (H)	4–1	Round of 16	Empoli (H)	3–2 (a.e.t.)
Sassuolo (H)	2–1	Quarter-finals	Roma (H)	2–0
Fiorentina	1–0 (A), 2–0 (H) (3–0 agg.)	Semi-finals	Milan	0–0 (A), 3–0 (H) (3–0 agg.)

== Match ==
=== Details ===
11 May 2022
21:00 CEST

Juventus	2–4 (a.e.t.)	Internazionale
Alex Sandro 50'; Vlahović 52'	Report	Barella 7'; Çalhanoğlu 80' (pen.); Perišić 99' (pen.), 102'

Stadio Olimpico, Rome
Attendance: 67,944
Referee: Paolo Valeri

Juventus	Internazionale

GK	36	(Italy) Mattia Perin
RB	6	(Brazil) Danilo		(substituted off) 41'
CB	4	(Netherlands) Matthijs de Ligt
CB	3	(Italy) Giorgio Chiellini (c)		(substituted off) 84'
LB	12	(Brazil) Alex Sandro		(substituted off) 91'
RM	11	(Colombia) Juan Cuadrado
CM	28	(Switzerland) Denis Zakaria		(substituted off) 67'
CM	25	(France) Adrien Rabiot
LM	20	(Italy) Federico Bernardeschi		(substituted off) 67'
SS	10	(Argentina) Paulo Dybala		(substituted off) 99'
CF	7	(Serbia) Dušan Vlahović
Substitutes:
GK	1	(Poland) Wojciech Szczęsny
GK	23	(Italy) Carlo Pinsoglio
DF	17	(Italy) Luca Pellegrini		(substituted on) 91'
DF	19	(Italy) Leonardo Bonucci		(substituted on) 67'
DF	24	(Italy) Daniele Rugani
MF	5	(Brazil) Arthur		(substituted on) 84'
MF	27	(Italy) Manuel Locatelli	(yellow card) 90+2'	(substituted on) 67'
MF	41	(Italy) Hans Nicolussi
MF	47	(Italy) Fabio Miretti
FW	9	(Spain) Álvaro Morata		(substituted on) 41'
FW	18	(Italy) Moise Kean		(substituted on) 99'
FW	38	(France) Marley Aké
Manager:
(Italy) Massimiliano Allegri			(yellow card) 83' (red card) 104'

GK	1	(Slovenia) Samir Handanović (c)
CB	37	(Slovakia) Milan Škriniar
CB	6	(Netherlands) Stefan de Vrij
CB	33	(Italy) Danilo D'Ambrosio		(substituted off) 64'
RM	36	(Italy) Matteo Darmian		(substituted off) 64'
CM	23	(Italy) Nicolò Barella
CM	77	(Croatia) Marcelo Brozović	(yellow card) 55'
CM	20	(Turkey) Hakan Çalhanoğlu		(substituted off) 90+1'
LM	14	(Croatia) Ivan Perišić
CF	10	(Argentina) Lautaro Martínez		(substituted off) 90+1'
CF	9	(Bosnia and Herzegovina) Edin Džeko		(substituted off) 63'
Substitutes:
GK	21	(Italy) Alex Cordaz
GK	97	(Romania) Ionuț Radu
DF	2	(Netherlands) Denzel Dumfries		(substituted on) 64'
DF	13	(Italy) Andrea Ranocchia
DF	18	(Germany) Robin Gosens
DF	32	(Italy) Federico Dimarco		(substituted on) 64'	(substituted off) 116'
DF	95	(Italy) Alessandro Bastoni			(substituted on) 116'
MF	5	(Italy) Roberto Gagliardini
MF	22	(Chile) Arturo Vidal	(yellow card) 119'	(substituted on) 90+1'
FW	7	(Chile) Alexis Sánchez		(substituted on) 90+1'
FW	19	(Argentina) Joaquín Correa		(substituted on) 63'
FW	88	(Ecuador) Felipe Caicedo
Manager:
(Italy) Simone Inzaghi

Man of the Match:
Ivan Perišić (Internazionale)

Assistant referees:
Alessandro Giallatini
Fabiano Preti
Fourth official:
Simone Sozza
Reserve assistant referee:
Salvatore Longo
Video assistant referee:
Aleandro Di Paolo
Assistant video assistant referee:
Rosario Abisso

Match rules

- 90 minutes.
- 30 minutes of extra time if necessary.
- Penalty shoot-out if scores still level.
- Twelve named substitutes.
- Maximum of five substitutions, with a sixth allowed in extra time. (Note: Each team was given only three opportunities to make substitutions, excluding substitutions made at half-time, before the start of extra time and at half-time in extra time.)

== See also ==
- 2021–22 Inter Milan season
- 2021–22 Juventus FC season
