= Carlo Mattrel =

Italian footballer (1937-1976)

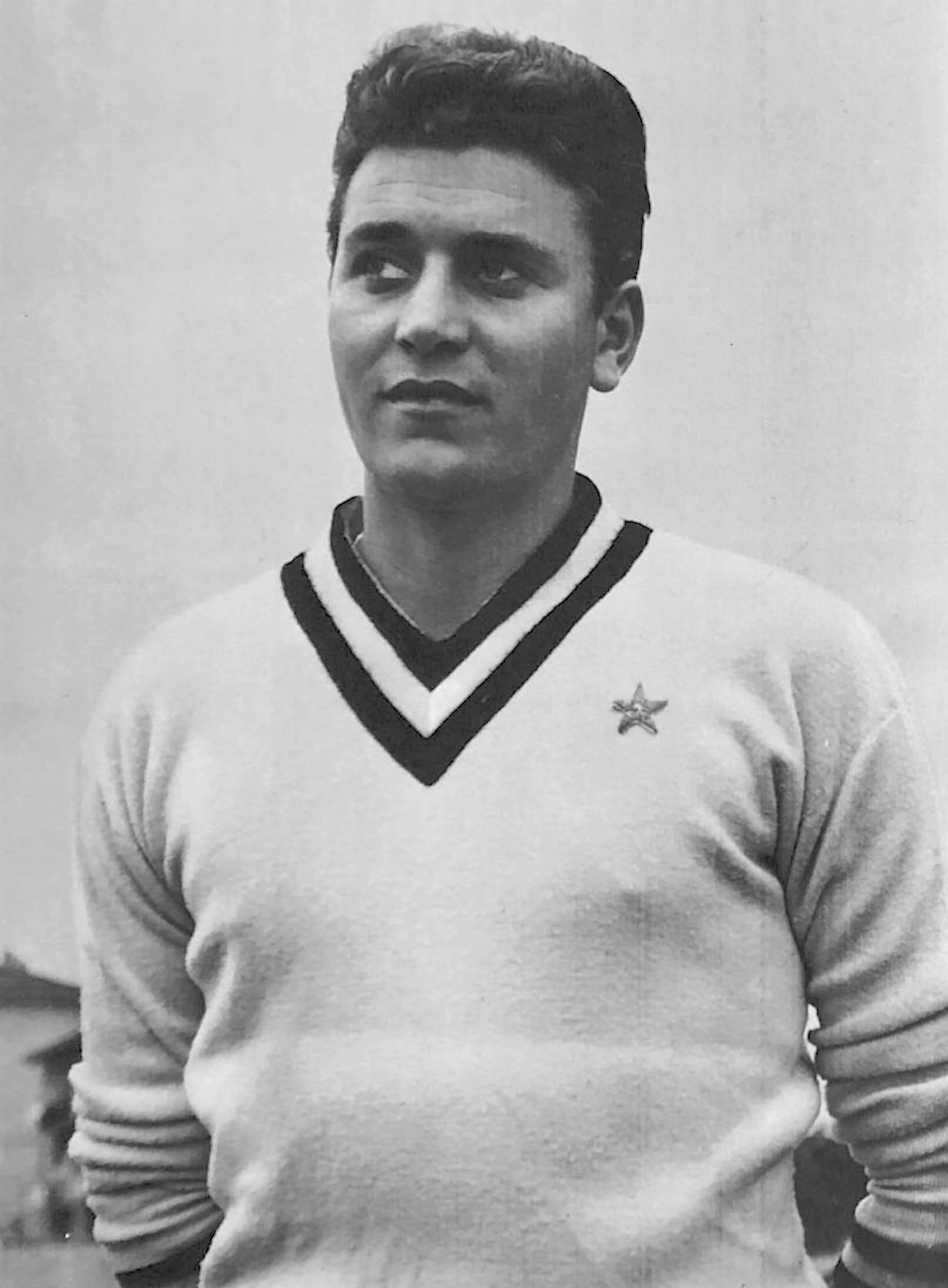
- Mattrel with Juventus between late 1950s and early 1960s

Personal information
- Full name: Carlo Mattrel
- Date of birth: 14 April 1937
- Place of birth: Turin, Kingdom of Italy
- Date of death: 25 September 1976 (aged 39)
- Place of death: Front, Italy
- Height: 1.83 m (6 ft 0 in)
- Position: Goalkeeper

Youth career
- Juventus

Senior career*
Years	Team	Apps	(Gls)
1955–1956	Juventus	0	(0)
1956–1957	→ Anconitana (loan)	33	(0)
1957–1961	Juventus	72	(0)
1961–1962	→ Palermo (loan)	34	(0)
1962–1965	Juventus	21	(0)
1965–1967	Cagliari	25	(0)
1967–1968	SPAL	5	(0)
Total		190	(0)

International career
1958	Italy U-21	2	(0)
1958	Italy B	1	(0)
1962	Italy	2	(0)
- * Club domestic league appearances and goals

Carlo Mattrel (Italian pronunciation: [ˈkarlo matˈtrɛl]; 14 April 1937 – 25 September 1976) was an Italian footballer, who played as a goalkeeper. During his career, he was regarded as one of the top goalkeepers in Italy, and had a highly successful career at club level playing for Juventus in particular, while also representing other Italian clubs. At international level, he represented the Italy national football team at the 1962 FIFA World Cup.

== Club career ==
Mattrel played with Juventus for most of his career, between 1955 and 1965, aside from two brief loan spells with Anconitana and Palermo. With the Turin club, he won three Serie A titles during the 1957–58, 1959–60, and 1960–61 seasons, as well as three Coppa Italia tournaments in 1959, 1960, and 1965. After his time with Juventus, he spent two seasons with Cagliari, and one final season with SPAL before retiring in 1968. Throughout his career, he made 158 appearances in Serie A, 27 in the Coppa Italia, 4 in the European Cup, and 1 in the Cup Winners' Cup.

== International career ==
He made his first appearance for Italy on 13 May 1962 in a 3–1 away win over Belgium. Mattrel was also part of the Italy squad in the 1962 FIFA World Cup, initially as a back-up for Lorenzo Buffon, but he went on to make an appearance for Italy in the infamous second group match against hosts Chile on 2 June, known also as the "Battle of Santiago", as Italy were defeated, and eliminated in the first round of the tournament.

== Style of play ==
Regarded as one of the best Italian goalkeepers of his generation, Mattrel was as a serious, hard-working, and disciplined player, who was capable of organising his defence well. Despite not being a particularly strong, acrobatic, or athletic keeper, or a good puncher of the ball, which saw him struggle on crosses, he was known however for his shot-stopping ability, excellent positional sense, speed when rushing off his line, and his ability to read the game, as well as his agility, in spite of his tall, slender frame.

== After retirement ==
After his playing career, Mattrel became a building contractor. He died in 1976, aged 39, in a road accident.

== Honours ==
Juventus

- Serie A: 1957–58, 1959–60, 1960–61
- Coppa Italia: 1958–59, 1959–60, 1964–65
