= Corrado Banchi =

Italian photographer (1912–1999)

- Born: 6 November 1912; Florence, Kingdom of Italy
- Died: 24 April 1999 (aged 86); Massa Marittima, Province of Grosseto, Italy
- Occupation: Photographer

Corrado Banchi (6 November 1912 – 24 April 1999) was an Italian photographer, known for his sports photography and for documenting the social and economic transformations of Italy during the 20th century. His most famous image is the "Carlo Parola's bicycle kick", taken during a Fiorentina–Juventus match in 1950 and later used on Panini football stickers.

== Life and career ==
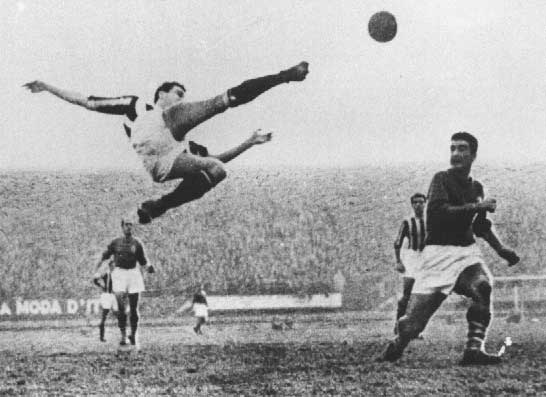
Carlo Parola's bycicle kick (Florence, 15 January 1950)

Born in Florence, Banchi developed an interest in photography as a child. In the 1930s he played football at youth level for the local club Libertas, while beginning his photographic activity.

During World War II, he was stationed in Follonica and documented wartime events in the Massa Marittima area, including the burial of the 83 miners killed in the Niccioleta massacre and the arrival of the United States Army in Massa Marittima on 24 June 1944. After settling in Massa Marittima, he opened a professional photographic studio.

From the late 1940s he worked as a photojournalist, collaborating with newspapers such as Il Tirreno and La Nazione. He specialised in sports photography and followed the Italian national football team at international competitions. On 15 January 1950, during the Serie A match Fiorentina–Juventus at the Stadio Artemio Franchi, he captured the famous image of Juventus defender Carlo Parola performing a bicycle kick. He also documented the first editions of Miss Italia.

Between 1952 and 1956 he collaborated with the newsreel Settimana Incom, producing film reports on sporting events and current affairs. His work also documented the mining communities of Maremma, including the Ribolla mining disaster of 1954, as well as the industrial and tourist development of the Grosseto coast during the 1960s.

He was awarded the title of Cavaliere by President Sandro Pertini. He died in Massa Marittima on 24 April 1999.

== Sources ==
- Bonazza, Carlo (2023). Corrado Banchi fotografo. Grosseto: Photoedizioni.
- Crispolti, Enrico; Mazzanti, Anna; Quattrocchi, Luca, eds. (2006). Arte in Maremma nella prima metà del Novecento. Cinisello Balsamo: Silvana Editoriale.
