= Gianfranco Leoncini =

Italian footballer (1939–2019)

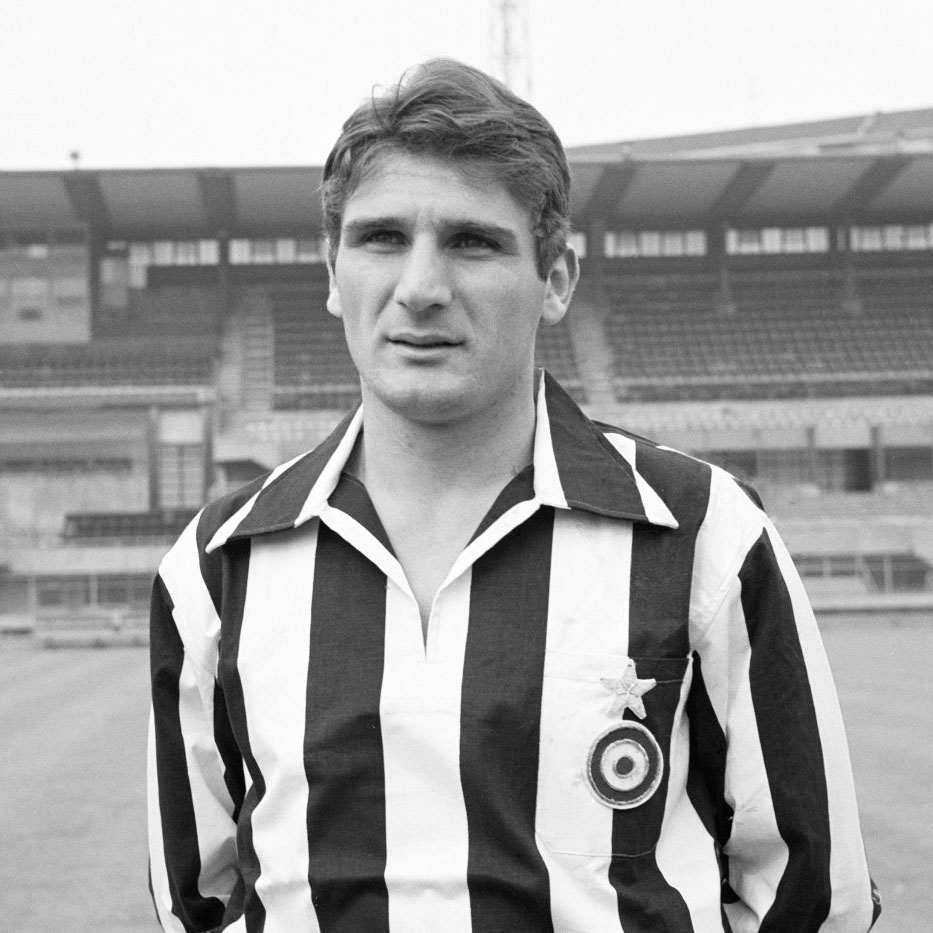
- Leoncini with Juventus in the 1965–66 season

Personal information
- Full name: Gianfranco Leoncini
- Date of birth: 25 September 1939
- Place of birth: Rome, Italy
- Date of death: 5 April 2019 (aged 79)
- Place of death: Chivasso, Italy
- Height: 1.76 m (5 ft 9 1/2 in)
- Position: Midfielder

Senior career*
Years	Team	Apps	(Gls)
1958–1970	Juventus	289	(21)
1970–1972	Atalanta	65	(0)
1972–1973	Mantova	28	(0)
1973–1974	Atalanta	29	(0)
Total		411	(21)

International career
1966	Italy	2	(0)

Managerial career
- 1975–1976: Atalanta
- * Club domestic league appearances and goals

Gianfranco Leoncini (Italian pronunciation: [dʒaɱˈfraŋko leonˈtʃiːni]; 25 September 1939 – 5 April 2019) was an Italian footballer who played as a midfielder.

== Club career ==
During his club career, Leoncini played for Juventus, Atalanta and Mantova. He won three Serie A titles with Juventus.

== International career ==
At international level, Leoncini earned 2 caps for the Italy national football team in 1966, and participated in the 1966 FIFA World Cup.

== Honours ==
Juventus

- Coppa Italia: 1958–59, 1959–60, 1964–65
- Serie A: 1959–60, 1960–61, 1966–67

Individual

- Juventus FC Hall of Fame: 2025
