= Giuseppe Corradi =

Italian footballer and coach (1932–2002)

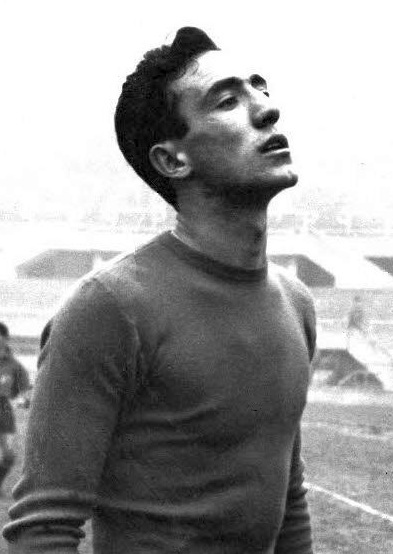
- Corradi between 1951 and 1953

Personal information
- Date of birth: 6 July 1932
- Place of birth: Modena, Italy
- Date of death: 21 July 2002 (aged 70)
- Height: 1.79 m (5 ft 10 1/2 in)
- Position: Defender

Senior career*
Years	Team	Apps	(Gls)
1949–1951	Modena	43	(0)
1951–1959	Juventus	191	(5)
1959–1960	Genoa	31	(0)
1960–1961	Modena	38	(0)
1961–1964	Mantova	48	(0)

International career
1952–1958	Italy	8	(0)

Managerial career
- 1969–1970: Pisa
- 1971–1973: Lecce
- 1973–1976: Spezia
- 1977–1978: Pisa
- * Club domestic league appearances and goals

Giuseppe Corradi (Italian pronunciation: [dʒuˈzɛppe korˈraːdi]; 7 July 1932 – 21 July 2002) was an Italian professional football player and coach who played as a defender.

== Honours ==
=== Club ===
Juventus

- Serie A champion: 1951–52, 1957–58
- Coppa Italia winner: 1958–59

=== International ===
- Represented Italy at the 1952 Summer Olympics
