= Benito Boldi =

Italian footballer (1934–2021)

Personal information
- Date of birth: 19 February 1934
- Place of birth: Tarcento, Italy
- Date of death: 3 February 2021 (aged 86)
- Place of death: Biella, Italy
- Height: 1.81 m (5 ft 11 in)
- Position: Defender

Senior career*
| Years | Team | Apps | (Gls) |
| 1953–1955 | SPAL | 11 | (0) |
| 1955–1956 | Juventus | 4 | (0) |
| 1956–1957 | SPAL | 10 | (0) |
| 1957–1959 | Juventus | 10 | (0) |
| 1959–1960 | Catania | 27 | (0) |
| 1960–1962 | Cesena | 49 | (0) |
| 1962–1968 | Biellese | 173 | (0) |
| Total | | 284 | (0) |
- * Club domestic league appearances and goals

Benito Boldi (19 February 1934 – 3 February 2021) was an Italian professional footballer who played as a defender.

== Career ==
Boldi was part of the Juventus teams that won the 1957–58 Serie A and the 1958–59 Coppa Italia. He played for SPAL and Catania in Serie B and for Cesena and Biellese in Serie C.

== Personal life ==
Boldi was born in Tarcento, Province of Udine. His brothers Mario Boldi and Luciano Boldi also played football professionally. To distinguish them, Benito was known as Boldi II. He was married with two children.

== Death ==
Boldi died from complications brought about by COVID-19 on 3 February 2021, during the COVID-19 pandemic in Italy, sixteen days short from his 87th birthday.

== Honours ==
- Serie A: 1957–58
- Coppa Italia: 1958–59
