= Giorgio Turchi =

Italian footballer

Personal information
- Date of birth: January 27, 1931
- Place of birth: Carpi, Italy
- Date of death: February 3, 2022 (aged 91)
- Position: Midfielder

Senior career*
Years	Team	Apps	(Gls)
1950–1951	Carpi		
1951–1954	Bologna	11	(0)
1954–1956	Juventus	39	(0)
1956–1957	L.R. Vicenza	6	(1)
1957–1959	Juventus	8	(0)
1959–1960	Cagliari	32	(1)
1960–1962	Cesena	43	(2)
- * Club domestic league appearances and goals

Giorgio Turchi (January 27, 1931 – February 3, 2022) was an Italian professional footballer.

== Honours ==
- Serie A champion: 1957–58
