= Enzo Matteucci =

Italian footballer and coach (1933–1992)

Personal information
- Date of birth: 20 December 1933
- Place of birth: Ancona, Italy
- Date of death: 3 July 1992 (aged 58)
- Place of death: Ancona, Italy
- Height: 1.73 m (5 ft 8 in)
- Position: Goalkeeper

Senior career*
Years	Team	Apps	(Gls)
1953–1954	Andreanelli		
1954–1956	Sambenedettese	52	(0)
1956–1960	Internazionale	84	(0)
1960–1961	SPAL	19	(0)
1961–1966	Roma	32	(0)
1966–1970	Sampdoria	10	(0)
1969–1970	→ Casale (loan)	16	(0)

Managerial career
- 1972–1974: Trevigliese
- Ospitaletto
- Brescia
- * Club domestic league appearances and goals

Enzo Matteucci (20 December 1933 – 3 July 1992) was an Italian professional football player and coach.
