= Eugenio Rizzolini =

Italian footballer (1937–2025)

Personal information
- Date of birth: 30 August 1937
- Place of birth: Milan, Italy
- Date of death: 24 May 2025 (aged 87)
- Height: 1.77 m (5 ft 10 in)
- Position: Defender

Youth career
- 1955–1956: A.C. Milan

Senior career*
Years	Team	Apps	(Gls)
1956–1959	Inter Milan	4	(1)
1957–1958	→ Novara (loan)	30	(0)
1959–1960	Ozo Mantova	29	(5)
1960–1968	Brescia	235	(11)
Total		298	(17)
- * Club domestic league appearances and goals

Eugenio Rizzolini (30 August 1937 – 24 May 2025) was an Italian professional footballer. In 2013, the newspaper Corriere della Sera included Rizzolini in a list of Brescia Calcio's best defensive midfielders. Rizzolini died on 24 May 2025, at the age of 87.
