= Ernesto Castano =

Italian footballer (1939–2023)

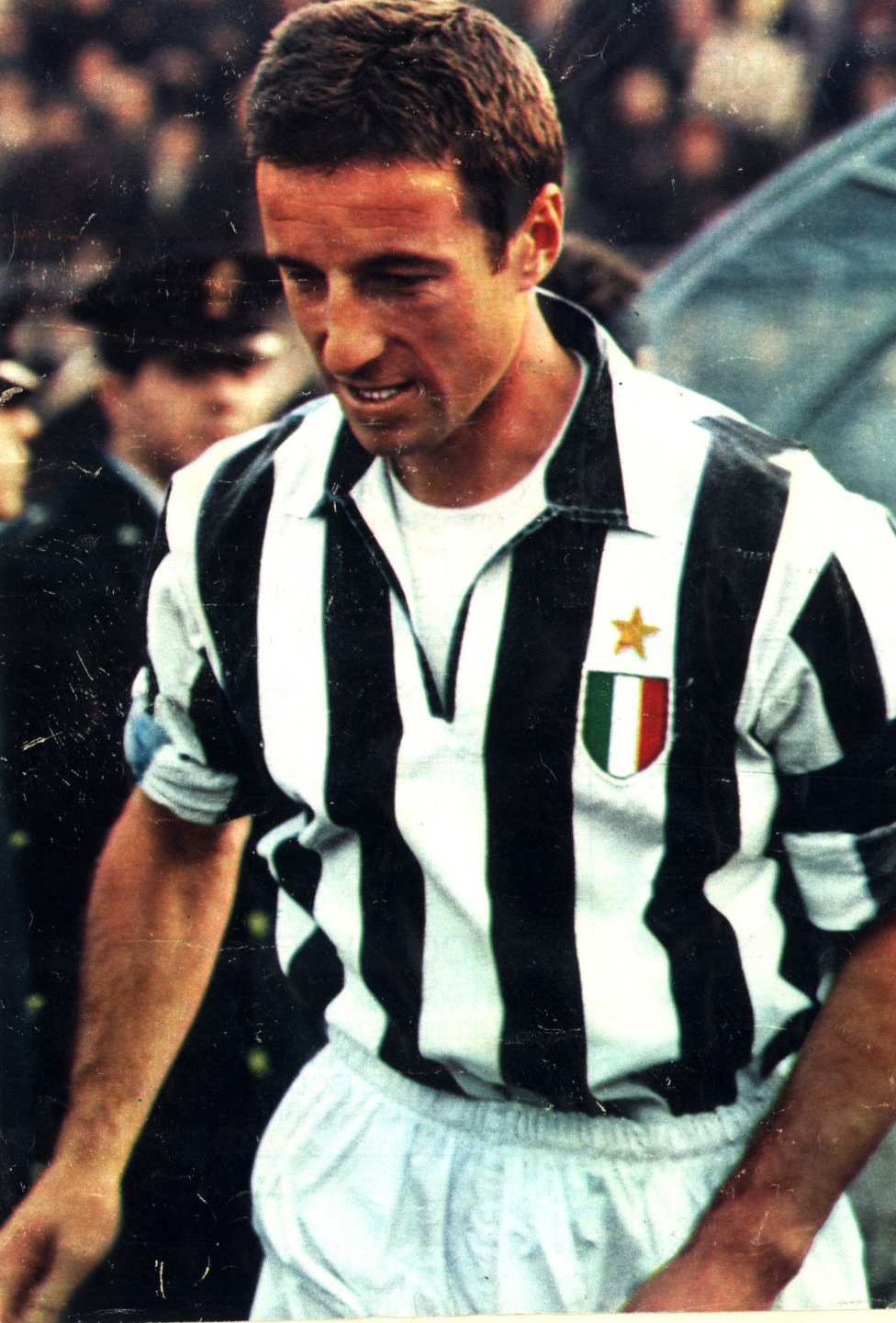
- Castano in 1967

Personal information
- Date of birth: 2 May 1939
- Place of birth: Cinisello Balsamo, Italy
- Date of death: 5 January 2023 (aged 83)
- Height: 1.83 m (6 ft 0 in)
- Position: Centre-back

Youth career
- Balsamese

Senior career*
| Years | Team | Apps | (Gls) |
| 1956–1957 | Legnano | 26 | (0) |
| 1957–1958 | Triestina | 31 | (0) |
| 1958–1970 | Juventus | 265 | (0) |
| Total | | 322 | (0) |

International career
| 1959–1969 | Italy | 7 | (0) |
Medal record
Men's football
Representing Italy (as player)
UEFA European Championship
| Winner | 1968 Italy |
- * Club domestic league appearances and goals

Ernesto Castano (Italian pronunciation: [erˈnɛsto ˈkastano]; 2 May 1939 – 5 January 2023) was an Italian professional footballer who played as a defender. Throughout his club career he played for Legnano, Triestina, and Juventus, winning domestic titles at the latter club. At international level, he was a member of the Italy national team that won UEFA Euro 1968.

== Club career ==
Castano was born in Cinisello Balsamo in the Province of Milan. He played club football for three Italian clubs throughout his career: Legnano, Triestina, and most prominently with Juventus, where he won several domestic titles, also serving as the team's captain.

== International career ==
At international level, Castano also played for the Italy national team on seven occasions between 1959 and 1969, winning the 1968 UEFA European Championship on home soil.

== Italian Footballers Association ==
On 3 July 1968, Castano founded the Italian Footballers' Association (AIC), in Milan, along with a number of fellow players including Giacomo Bulgarelli, Sandro Mazzola, Gianni Rivera, Giancarlo De Sisti, and Giacomo Losi. The recently retired Sergio Campana, also a lawyer, was appointed president of the association.

== Death ==
Castano died on 5 January 2023, at the age of 83.

== Honours ==
Juventus

- Coppa Italia: 1958–59, 1959–60, 1964–65
- Serie A 1959–60, 1960–61, 1966–67

Italy

- UEFA European Football Championship: 1968

Individual

- Juventus FC Hall of Fame: 2025
