= Piero Aggradi =

Italian footballer (1934–2008)

Personal information
- Full name: Piero Aggradi
- Date of birth: 7 October 1934
- Place of birth: Turin, Italy
- Date of death: 17 July 2008 (aged 73)
- Place of death: Pescara, Italy
- Position: Midfielder

Senior career*
Years	Team	Apps	(Gls)
1952–1959	Juventus	14	(0)
1952–1953	→ Monza (loan)	2	(0)
1957–1958	→ Palermo (loan)	14	(0)
1959–1960	Pordenone	29	(5)
1960–1961	Cesena	23	(0)
1961–1963	Casale	47	(18)
1963–1966	Chieri	40	(9)
- * Club domestic league appearances and goals

Piero Aggradi (7 October 1934 in Turin – 17 July 2008 in Pescara) was a professional Italian football player.

Born in Turin in 1934, he joined Juventus' youth academy at twelve. After loan spells at Monza (Serie B) and Carrarese (Serie C), he returned to Juventus in 1954, making 14 appearances over three seasons. He debuted in Serie A on October 30, 1955, in a 1-1 draw against Roma.

He played as a central midfielder, making 14 appearances in Serie A between 1955 and 1959 and playing 8 matches for the military national team. He later played for Palermo, Alessandria, and Pordenone.

After retiring as a player, Aggradi decided to pursue a career in football management and, in 1974, took on his first role as sporting director of Pescara, newly promoted to Serie B. Three years later, the team reached Serie A for the first time in its history. Notably, he was the one who brought young Alessandro Del Piero to Juventus.
