= Luigi Fuin =

Italian footballer

Personal information
- Date of birth: February 22, 1928
- Place of birth: Cologna Veneta, Italy
- Date of death: November 5, 2009 (aged 81)
- Height: 1.80 m (5 ft 11 in)
- Position: Midfielder

Senior career*
Years	Team	Apps	(Gls)
1946–1947	Cologna Veneta		
1947–1949	Verona	18	(3)
1949–1951	Palermo	53	(0)
1951–1958	Lazio	148	(3)
1958–1959	Juventus	8	(0)
- * Club domestic league appearances and goals

Luigi Fuin (February 22, 1928 in Cologna Veneta – November 5, 2009) was an Italian professional football player.
