= Piero Stivanello =

Italian footballer and manager

Piero Stivanello (born 26 March 1957 in Turin) is an Italian retired football player and manager. He is the son of former Juventus footballer Giorgio Stivanello and played as a midfielder. He played for Vicenza Calcio youth teams and made his debut on 26 January 1975 against Juventus. At the end of the season, Lanerossi Vicenza relegated and the subsequent year he played two more matches with them in Serie B. He also played for Reggiana, Massese and Valdagno. After his retirement, he became an amatorial manager. He coached Cavazzale and San Paolo in Eccellenza.

== Career a player ==
- 1974-1976 L.R. Vicenza 3 (0)
- 1976-1977 Reggiana 6 (1)
- 1977-1978 L.R. Vicenza 0 (0)
- 1978-1979 Massese 22 (3)
- 1979-1981 Valdagno ? (?)
- ???? Cittadella ? (?)

== Career as a coach ==
- 2005-2007 Cavazzale
- 2007- San Paolo
