= Francesco Stacchino =

Italian footballer

Personal information
- Date of birth: February 20, 1940 (age 86)
- Place of birth: Chieri, Italy
- Position: Midfielder

Senior career*
Years	Team	Apps	(Gls)
1958–1959	Juventus	2	(1)
1959–1960	Sanremese	27	(6)
1960–1961	Juventus	0	(0)
1961–1962	Biellese	26	(2)
1962–1963	Cremonese	23	(2)
1963–1966	Chieri	76	(4)
- * Club domestic league appearances and goals

Francesco Stacchino (born February 20, 1940, in Chieri) is an Italian former professional footballer.
