= Carlo Parola =

Italian footballer (1921–2000)

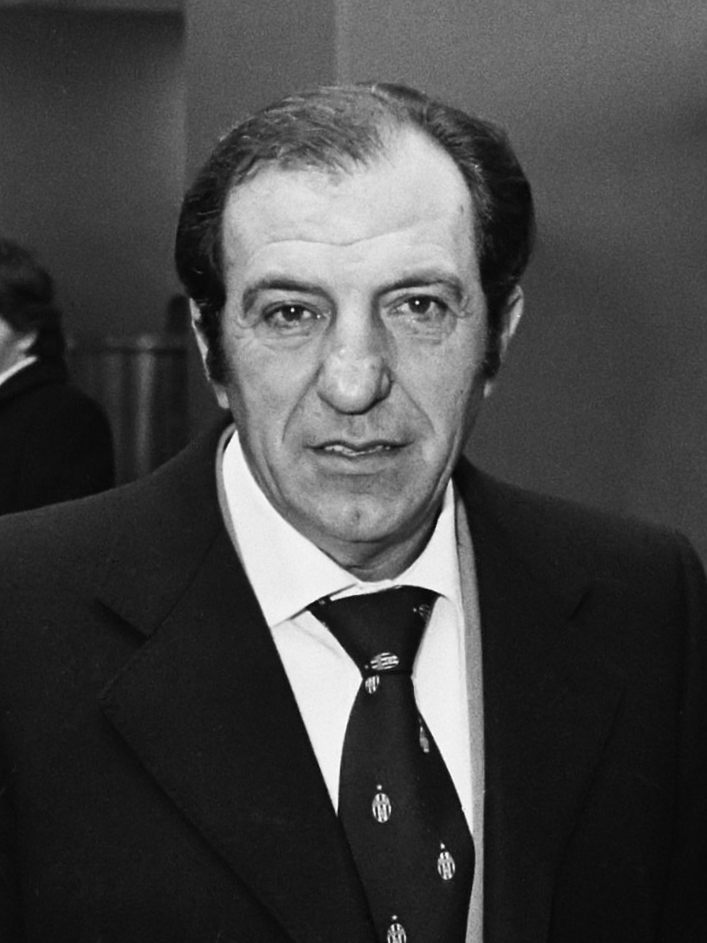
- Parola in 1974

Personal information
- Date of birth: 20 September 1921
- Place of birth: Turin, Kingdom of Italy
- Date of death: 22 March 2000 (aged 78)
- Place of death: Turin, Italy
- Height: 1.76 m (5 ft 9 in)
- Position: Defender

Youth career
- 1936–1939: Juventus

Senior career*
Years	Team	Apps	(Gls)
1939–1954	Juventus	334	(10)
1954–1955	Lazio	7	(0)

International career
1945–1950	Italy	10	(0)

Managerial career
- 1956–1958: Anconitana
- 1959–1961: Juventus
- 1961–1962: Juventus
- 1964–1965: Livorno
- 1969–1974: Novara
- 1974–1976: Juventus
- * Club domestic league appearances and goals

Carlo Parola (Italian pronunciation: [ˈkarlo paˈrɔːla]; 20 September 1921 – 22 March 2000), was an Italian football player and coach who played as a defender. Throughout his career, he won domestic titles with Italian club Juventus, both as a player and as a manager. At international level, he took part at the 1950 FIFA World Cup with the Italy national team.

== Career ==
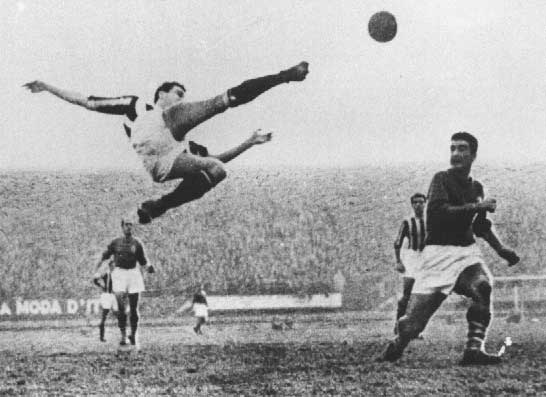
Parola executing his signature bicycle kick in a match between Juventus and Fiorentina (Corrado Banchi, 1950).

Parola was born in Turin. He is mostly known for his time with Juventus with whom he played over 300 games between 1939 and 1954, winning two Serie A titles and a Coppa Italia, and even serving as the club's captain from 1949 onwards. He also had brief spells with Lazio and Midland in Argentina, before going into management. At international level, he was capped for Italy on 10 occasions between 1945 and 1950, and represented his country at the 1950 FIFA World Cup.

As a coach, he managed several Italian clubs throughout his career, and had spells with Anconitana, Juventus, Livorno, and Novara. He won the Serie A title during his second spell as Juventus's coach in 1975, a title he had previously also won as a player for the club.

== Style of play ==
A quick, mobile, hard-working, versatile, and powerful player, with good technique, Parola was capable of playing both as a defender and as a defensive midfielder, due to his strength, stamina, and man-marking, which led him to be regarded as one of Italy's greatest defenders. Under his manager Felice Borel in the WM system, known as sistema in Italy, he often played as a centre-half-back, a position which was known as the centromediano metodista role in Italian football jargon, due to its association with the metodo system. In this position, he was given both defensive and creative duties, functioning as both a ball–winner who was tasked with retreating into defence to mark opposing forwards, and also as a deep-lying playmaker after winning back the ball, a position which led to the development of the sweeper, or libero role. He was also capable of playing as a man–marking centre-back, or stopper, and as a full-back. He was also known to be fair player, although because of this, some in the sport accused him of not being aggressive or tenacious enough in his tackling; as such, manager Vittorio Pozzo often preferred to use Mario Rigamonti in the holding midfield role with the Italy national team. An agile and athletic player, in addition to his defensive skills, he was also known for his skill in the air, and ability to score goals with acrobatic strikes, from volleys and bicycle kicks, having played as a forward in his youth; indeed, during the 1940s, he popularised the use of the bicycle kick in Italy, earning the nickname Signor Rovesciata ("Mr. Overhead Kick"), and was even credited with its invention by the Italians. As a youngster, Parola also played in several other positions, including the roles of goalkeeper, winger, and centre-forward.

== Legacy ==
Known for his acrobatic volleys and spectacular overhead kicks, a famous picture of Parola executing a bicycle kick was adopted as the logo of Panini Group.

== Honours ==
=== Player ===
Juventus

- Serie A: 1949–50, 1951–52
- Coppa Italia: 1941–42

Individual

- Juventus FC Hall of Fame: 2025

=== Manager ===
Juventus

- Serie A: 1959–60, 1960–61, 1974–75
- Coppa Italia: 1958–59, 1959–60

== Bibliography ==
- Glanville, Brian (1968). Soccer: A History of the Game, Its Players, and Its Strategy. New York City: Crown Publishing Group. ISBN 978-0-517-50796-4.
- Simpson, Paul; Hesse, Uli (2013). Who Invented the Stepover?. London: Profile Books Ltd. ISBN 978-1-78125-006-8.

== See also ==
- History of the bicycle kick
