= Carlo Dell'Omodarme =

Italian footballer (born 1938)

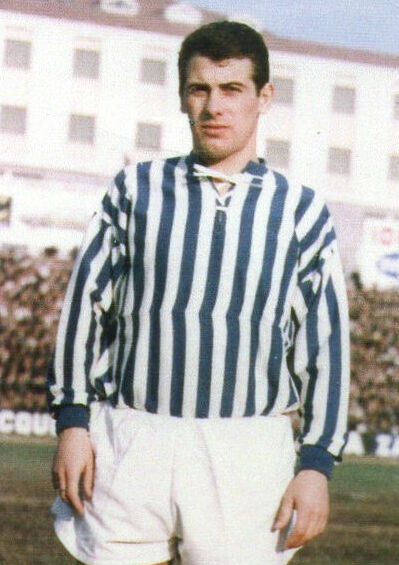
- Dell'Omodarme with SPAL in the 1960s

Personal information
- Date of birth: 11 February 1938 (age 88)
- Place of birth: La Spezia, Italy
- Height: 1.71 m (5 ft 7 1/2 in)
- Position: Midfielder

Senior career*
| Years | Team | Apps | (Gls) |
| 1956–1957 | Juventus | 1 | (0) |
| 1957–1958 | Parma | 31 | (6) |
| 1958–1961 | Como | 92 | (24) |
| 1961–1963 | SPAL | 53 | (4) |
| 1963–1966 | Juventus | 48 | (3) |
| 1966–1969 | SPAL | 56 | (7) |
| 1972 | Rochester Lancers | 14 | (1) |
- * Club domestic league appearances and goals

Carlo Dell'Omodarme (born 11 February 1938) is an Italian former professional footballer who played as a midfielder.

== Career ==
Throughout his career, Dell'Omodarme played for Italian clubs Juventus, Parma, Como, and SPAL, before retiring with the Rochester Lancers in the American Soccer League. Despite his talent, he experienced mixed success during his two spells with Juventus, winning the Coppa Italia in 1965, but also undergoing criticism due to his inconsistency and individualistic playing style.

== Style of play ==
A skilful winger, Dell'Omodarme was known in particular for his excellent dribbling skills as a footballer, although he was also criticised for being selfish and for his work-rate.

== Honours ==
Juventus

- Coppa Italia winner: 1964–65.
