= Vincenzo Traspedini =

Italian footballer (1939–2003)

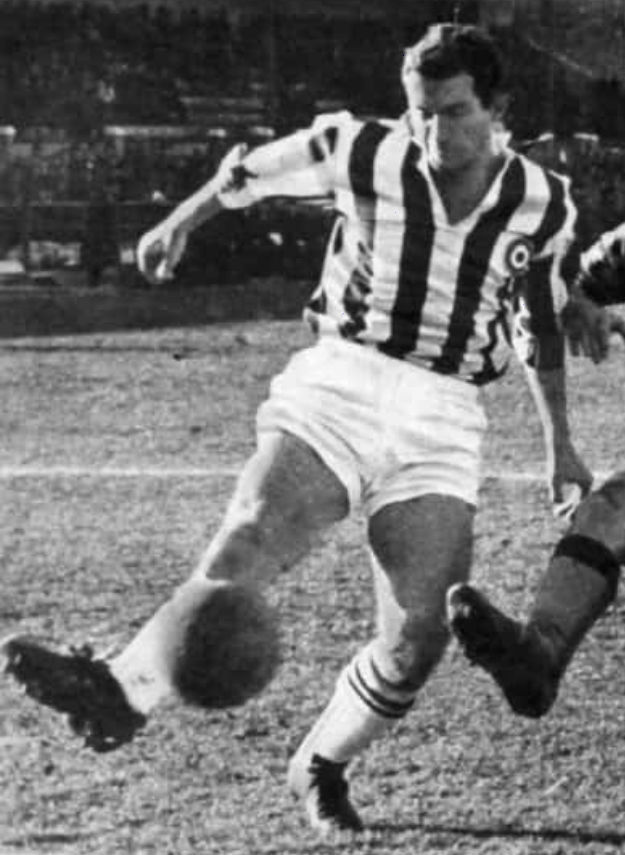
- Traspedini playing for Juventus in 1966

Personal information
- Date of birth: 27 December 1939
- Place of birth: Montodine, Italy
- Date of death: 14 April 2003 (aged 63)
- Place of death: Verona, Italy
- Height: 1.82 m (5 ft 11 1/2 in)
- Position: Striker

Senior career*
Years	Team	Apps	(Gls)
1959–1960	Fanfulla	31	(11)
1960–1961	Torino	8	(2)
1961–1963	Monza	63	(27)
1963–1965	Varese	70	(21)
1965–1966	Juventus	20	(2)
1966–1968	Foggia	62	(25)
1968–1969	Verona	34	(9)
1970	Atalanta	14	(3)
1971	Varese	14	(4)
1971–1973	Genoa	26	(6)
- * Club domestic league appearances and goals

Vincenzo Traspedini (born 27 December 1939 in Montodine; died 14 April 2003 in Verona) was an Italian professional footballer who played as a forward.
