= Venezia Calcio a 5 =

Italian futsal club

Venezia C5
- Full name: A.S.D. Casinò di Venezia Calcio a Cinque
- Founded: 1997
- Dissolved: 2013
- Ground: PalaCosmet, Dolo, Province of Venice, Italy
- Capacity: 1,000
- League: Serie A
Home colours	Away colours

A.S.D. Casinò di Venezia Calcio a Cinque was a futsal club based in Venezia, Veneto, Italy.

== Famous players ==
- (Italy) Marco Ercolessi
