= Giorgio Stivanello =

Italian footballer

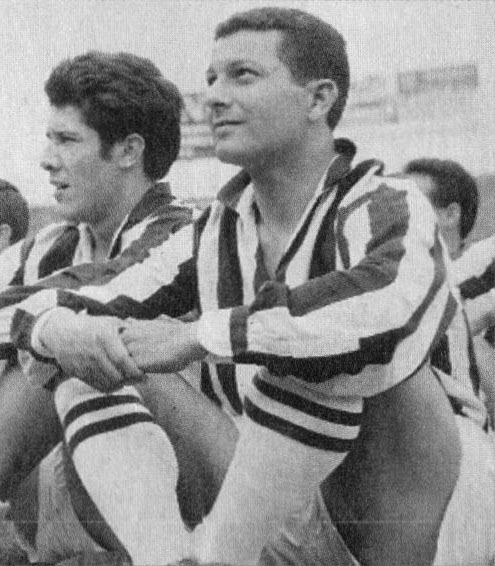
- Stivanello with Juventus in the 1957–58 season

Personal information
- Date of birth: 13 July 1932
- Place of birth: Venice, Italy
- Date of death: 18 May 2010 (aged 77)
- Height: 1.74 m (5 ft 8 1/2 in)
- Position: Striker

Senior career*
Years	Team	Apps	(Gls)
1951–1953	Venezia	18	(3)
1953–1956	Padova	90	(25)
1956–1962	Juventus	75	(17)
1962–1963	Venezia	7	(2)
1963–1964	Jesi		
- * Club domestic league appearances and goals

Giorgio Stivanello (13 July 1932 in Venice – 18 May 2010) was an Italian professional football player.

His son Piero Stivanello played football professionally.

== Honours ==
- Serie A champion: 1957/58, 1959/60, 1960/61.
- Coppa Italia winner: 1958/59, 1959/60.
