= 1964–65 Coppa Italia =

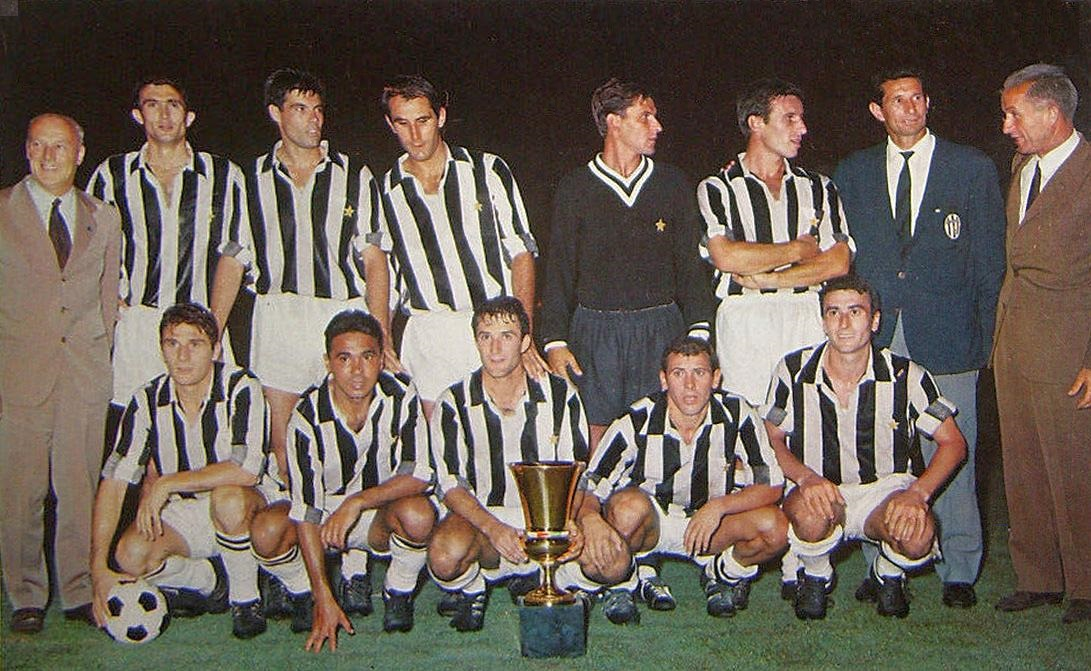
- Juventus poses with the trophy

Tournament details
- Country: Italy
- Dates: 6 September 1964 – 29 August 1965
- Teams: 38

Final positions
- Champions: Juventus (5th title)
- Runners-up: Internazionale

Tournament statistics
- Matches played: 37
- Goals scored: 106 (2.86 per match)
- Top goal scorer(s): Gigi Riva; Renzo Cappellaro; Francesco Rizzo; Cané; Giampaolo Menichelli; Bruno Petroni (3 goals each)

The 1964–65 Coppa Italia was the 18th edition of the Coppa Italia, a domestic football cup organised by the Italian Football Federation. It was won by Juventus, who defeated Internazionale 1–0 in the final.

== First round ==
Home team	Score	Away team
Alessandria	1–2	Juventus
Bari	1–4 (a.e.t.)	Foggia
Brescia	2–0	Mantova
Hellas Verona	0–2	Venezia
Lecco	2–0	Padova
Livorno	3–4	Cagliari
Modena	2–1	Vicenza
Parma	1–3	Sampdoria
Potenza	0–4	Catania
Pro Patria	1–0	Varese
Reggiana	0–2 (a.e.t.)	Genoa
Monza	2–1 (a.e.t.)	Milan
SPAL	3–0	Fiorentina
Napoli	2–1 (a.e.t.)	Messina
Palermo	4–3 (a.e.t.)	Catanzaro
Vigor Trani	0–3	Lazio
Triestina	1–3	Atalanta

== Intermediate round ==
Home team	Score	Away team
Napoli	0–0 (a.e.t.) *	Lazio

* Napoli qualified after drawing of lots.

== Second round ==
Home team	Score	Away team
Juventus	1–0	Brescia
Lecco	3–0	Sampdoria
Modena	1–1 (4–5 pen.)	Atalanta
Pro Patria	1–2 (a.e.t.)	Genoa
Napoli	2–1 (a.e.t.)	Foggia
Palermo	1–0	Catania
Cagliari	1–0	SPAL
Monza	2–1 (a.e.t.)	Venezia

== Third round ==
Home team	Score	Away team
Genoa	3–0	Monza
Lecco	0–2 (a.e.t.)	Juventus
Napoli	1–0	Palermo
Cagliari	5–0	Atalanta

== Quarter-finals ==
Torino, Bologna, Internazionale and Roma joined the competition in this round.

Home team	Score	Away team
Torino	2–0	Genoa
Bologna	0–0 (4–5 pen.)	Juventus
Internazionale	6–3 (a.e.t.)	Cagliari
Napoli	1–2	Roma

== Semi-finals ==
Home team	Score	Away team
Roma	2–2 (4–6 pen.)	Internazionale
Juventus	1–0	Torino

== Final ==
29 August 1965
21:00

Juventus	1–0	Internazionale
Menichelli 15'

Stadio Olimpico, Rome
Referee: Alessandro D'Agostini

== Top goalscorers ==
Rank	Player	Club	Goals
1	(Italy) Gigi Riva	Cagliari	3
1	(Italy) Renzo Cappellaro	Cagliari	3
1	(Italy) Francesco Rizzo	Cagliari	3
1	(Brazil) Cané	Napoli	3
1	(Italy) Giampaolo Menichelli	Juventus	3
1	(Italy) Bruno Petroni	Atalanta	3
2	(Brazil) Jair da Costa	Internazionale	2
2	(Italy) Sergio Gori	Internazionale	2
2	(Italy) Dario Cavallito	SPAL	2
2	(Italy) Dino Panzanato	Napoli	2
2	(Italy) Mariano Melonari	Monza	2
