= 1958–59 Coppa Italia =

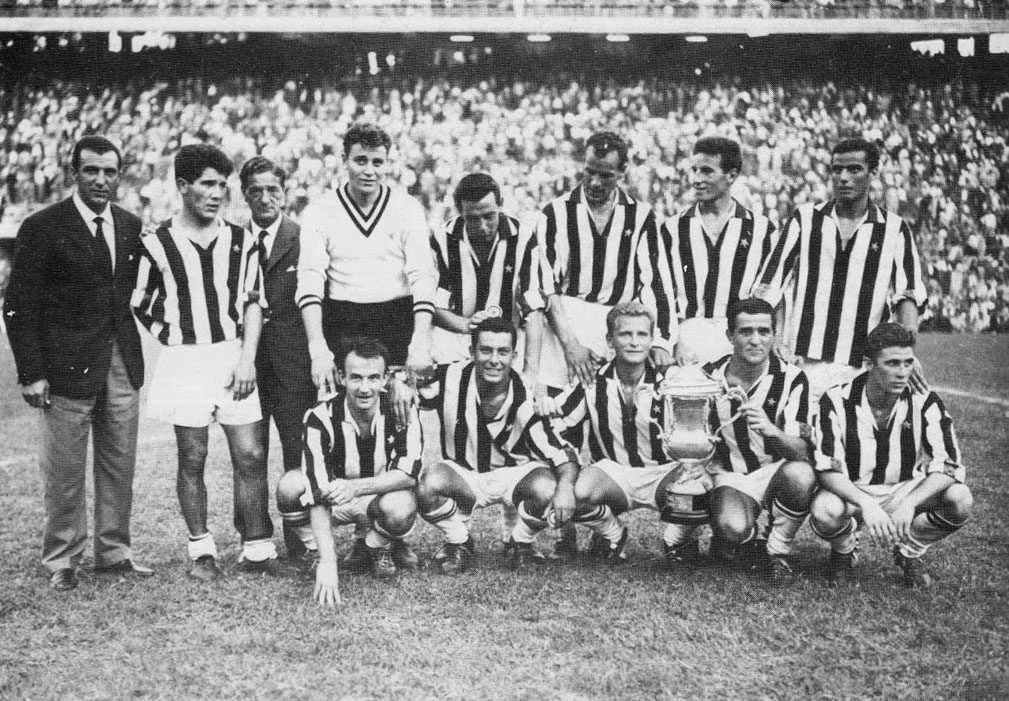
- Juventus pose with the trophy

Tournament details
- Country: Italy
- Dates: 30 Aug 1958 – 13 Sept 1959
- Teams: 77

Final positions
- Champions: Juventus (3rd title)
- Runners-up: Internazionale

Tournament statistics
- Matches played: 79
- Goals scored: 270 (3.42 per match)
- Top goal scorer: John Charles (5 goals)

The 1958–59 Coppa Italia was the 12th Coppa Italia, the major Italian domestic cup. The competition was won by Juventus.

== First round ==
Home team	Score	Away team
Anconitana	6-2	Pescara
L'Aquila	4-3	Chieti
Biellese	2-1	Pro Vercelli
Catanzaro	1-0	Cosenza
Foggia	3-1	Cirio
Lecce	2-1	Barletta
Livorno	0-1	FEDIT Roma
Lucchese	0-4	Pisa
Mantova	1-0	Cremonese
Marsala	2-4	Trapani
Pro Patria	2-0	Piacenza
Ravenna	2-3	Forlì
Salernitana	3-2	Casertana
Sanremese	5-2	Casale
Siena	1-0	Arezzo
Siracusa	0-2	Reggina
Spezia	2-3	Carbosarda
Varese	4-2	Legnano
Mestrina	0-1	Treviso

Replay match

Home team	Score	Away team
Mestrina	2-2 (p: 4–5)	Treviso

p=after penalty shoot-out

== Second round ==
21 clubs are added (Modena, Bari, Atalanta, Cagliari, Catania, Como, Taranto, Messina, Novara, Palermo, Parma, Lecco, Pordenone, Hellas Verona, Prato, Brescia, Reggiana, Sambenedettese, Monza, Vigevano, Venezia).

Home team	Score	Away team
L'Aquila	2-0	Modena
Bari	5-1	Foggia
Biellese	1-2	Atalanta
Carbosarda	1-0	Cagliari
Catanzaro	1-0	Catania
FEDIT Roma	1-0	Como
Lecce	1-0	Taranto
Messina	1-0	Reggina
Novara	1-2	Sanremese
Palermo	1-2	Trapani
Parma	2-3	Mantova
Pisa	1-0	Lecco
Pordenone	3-2	Hellas Verona
Prato	2-1	Salernitana
Pro Patria	2-1	Brescia
Reggiana	4-2	Anconitana
Sambenedettese	2-0	Forlì
Monza	1-0	Siena
Varese	2-0	Vigevano
Venezia	3-0	Treviso

== Third round ==
10 clubs are added (Alessandria, Roma, Internazionale, Napoli, Vicenza, Torino, Genoa, Triestina, SPAL, Udinese).

Home team	Score	Away team
Alessandria	0-3 *	FEDIT Roma
Atalanta	4-0	L'Aquila
Catanzaro	0-1	Roma
Lecce	0-1	Bari
Mantova	0-7	Internazionale
Napoli	5-0	Messina
Pisa	3-1	Vicenza
Pordenone	1-2	Torino
Prato	3-2	Trapani
Pro Patria	1-3	Genoa
Reggiana	0-2	Triestina
Sanremese	1-2	Venezia
Monza	2-1	Carbosarda
SPAL	3-2	Sambenedettese
Udinese	1-2	Varese

* The eliminated Alessandria are reinstated.

== Fourth round ==
Home team	Score	Away team
Alessandria	5-0	Pisa
Atalanta	2-1	SPAL
Bari	1-2	Varese
FEDIT Roma	1-2	Monza
Genoa	4-2	Triestina
Internazionale	3-2	Napoli
Roma	0-1	Venezia
Torino	3-0	Prato

== Round of 16 ==
8 clubs are added (Bologna, Milan, Fiorentina, Sampdoria, Juventus, Lazio, Marzotto Valdagno, Padova).

Home team	Score	Away team
Atalanta	1-2	Torino
Bologna	3-2	Milan
Fiorentina	2-1	Sampdoria
Genoa	2-1	Monza
Juventus	6-2 (aet)	Alessandria
Lazio	3-0	Varese
Marzotto Valdagno	0-2	Venezia
Padova	2-3	Internazionale

== Quarter-finals ==
Home team	Score	Away team
Genoa	2-1	Bologna
Juventus	3-1	Fiorentina
Lazio	0-1	Internazionale
Venezia	5-1	Torino

== Semi-finals ==
Home team	Score	Away team
Internazionale	1-0	Venezia
Juventus	3-1	Genoa

== Third place match ==
Home team	Score	Away team
Genoa	2-1	Venezia

== Final ==
13 June 1959
16:30

Internazionale	1–4	Juventus
Bicicli 36'		Charles 7'; Cervato 27', 79' (pen.); Sívori 63'

San Siro, Milan
Referee: Cesare Jonni

== Top goalscorers ==
Rank	Player	Club	Goals
1	(Wales) John Charles	Juventus	5
2	(Argentina) (Italy) Omar Sívori	Juventus	4
3	(Italy) Sergio Cervato	Juventus	3
