= 1930–31 FBC Juventus season =

Italian football club season

Foot-Ball Club Juventus
1930–31 season
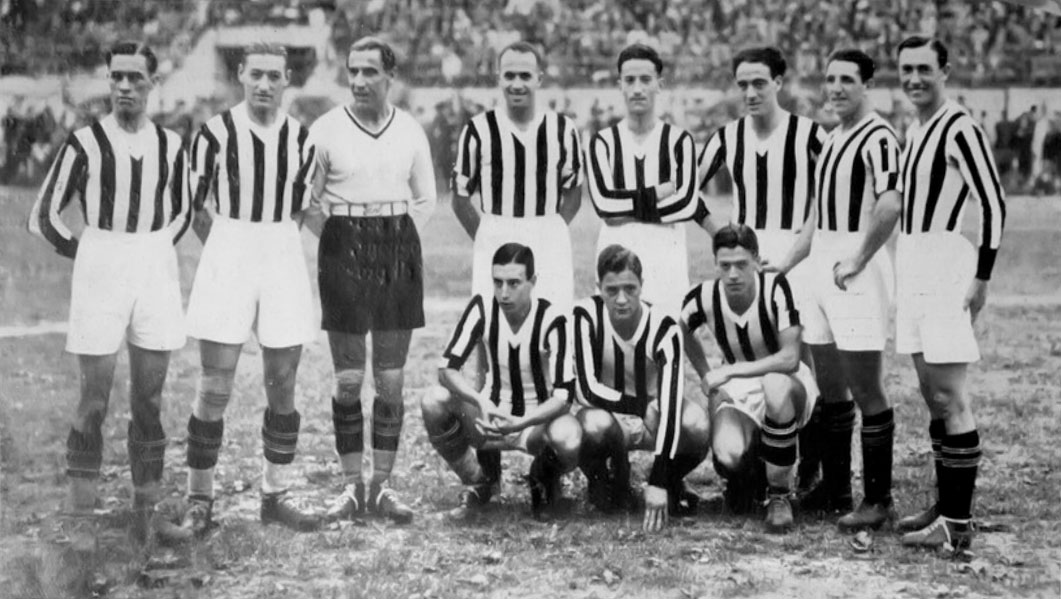
- President: Edoardo Agnelli
- Manager: Carlo Carcano
- Stadium: Campo Juventus
- Serie A: 1st (in 1931 Mitropa Cup)
- Mitropa Cup: Quarterfinals
- Top goalscorer: League: Raimundo Orsi (20); All: Orsi (21)
Home colours

During the 1930–31 Foot-Ball Club Juventus played in Serie A and Mitropa Cup.

== Summary ==
The team competed in its second Serie A with sole group format, and clinched the title. The club replaced Scottish coach Billy Aitken with former Italian National Team manager Carlo Carcano introducing Metodo tactic (2-3-2-3) with the defenders trio Combi-Rosetta-Caligaris (one of all-time best defenders line up).

The club renforced the block with Alfredo Bodoira and Umberto Ghibaudo. In midfield arrived Argentinean Eugenio Castellucci, also Francesco Rier and Aldo Vollono, on attack from Argentina José Maglio along with Giovanni Ferrari, Gilberto Pogliano et Giovanni Vecchina.

== Squad ==
Note: Flags indicate national team as defined under FIFA eligibility rules; some limited exceptions apply. Players may hold more than one non-FIFA nationality.

Pos.	Nation	Player
GK	ITA	Alfredo Bodoira
GK	ITA	Gianpiero Combi
GK	ITA	Umberto Ghibaudo
MF	ITA	Ezio Sclavi
DF	ITA	Umberto Caligaris
DF	ITA	Mario Ferrero
DF	ARG	Luis Monti
DF	ITA	Virginio Rosetta
DF	ITA	Varglien II
MF	ITA	Oreste Barale
MF	ITA	Luigi Bertolini
MF	ITA	Carlo Bigatto
MF	ARG	Eugenio Castellucci

Pos.	Nation	Player
MF	ITA	Carlo Crotti
MF	ITA	Lino Mosca
MF	ITA	Francesco Rier
MF	ITA	Varglien I
MF	ITA	Aldo Vollono
FW	ARG	Renato Cesarini
FW	ITA	Giovanni Ferrari
FW	ARG	José Maglio
FW	ITA	Federico Munerati
FW	ARG	Raimundo Orsi
FW	ITA	Gilberto Pogliano
FW	ITA	Giovanni Vecchina
FW	ITA	Vojak II

== Competitions ==
=== Serie A ===
==== League table ====
Pos	Team	Pld	W	D	L	GF	GA	GD	Pts	Qualification or relegation
1	Juventus (C)	34	25	5	4	79	37	+42	55	1931 Mitropa Cup
2	Roma	34	22	7	5	87	31	+56	51	1931 Mitropa Cup
3	Bologna	34	21	6	7	81	33	+48	48	
4	Genova 1893	34	22	3	9	58	47	+11	47	
5	Ambrosiana	34	15	8	11	60	45	+15	38	

Source: Panini
(C) Champions

==== Matches ====
28 September 1930 1	Juventus	4–1	Pro Patria	Turin
	Cesarini 1'; Vecchina 31', 75', 84'	Report	77' Colombo I	Stadium: Campo Juventus; Referee: Giusto Sardi

5 October 1930 2	Milan	0–3	Juventus	Milan
		Report	4', 73' Munerati; 78' Orsi	Stadium: Campo San Siro; Referee: Giuseppe Turbiani

12 October 1930 3	Juventus	2–0	Casale	Turin
	Orsi 68' (pen.), 82'	Report		Stadium: Campo Juventus; Referee: Nereo Bertoli

19 October 1930 4	Pro Vercelli	1–3	Juventus	Vercelli
	Ferraris II 76'	Report	9' Vecchina; 24' Munerati; 27' Orsi	Stadium: Foro Boario; Referee: Camillo Caironi

26 October 1930 5	Juventus	3–2	Roma	Turin
	Munerati 8'; Cesarini 18'; Orsi 61'	Report	4' Fasanelli; 63' Chini Ludueña	Stadium: Campo Juventus; Referee: Felice Rovida

2 November 1930 6	Genoa	0–3	Juventus	Genoa
		Report	44' Orsi; 87', 89' Ferrari	Stadium: Campo Marassi; Referee: Camillo Caironi

9 November 1930 7	Alessandria	2–3	Juventus	Alessandria
	Borelli 16'; Chierico 52'	Report	58', 89' (o.g.) Bertolini; 82' Vecchina	Stadium: Campo del Littorio; Referee: Umberto Gama

16 November 1930 8	Juventus	1–0	Legnano	Turin
	Orsi 17'	Report		Stadium: Campo Juventus; Referee: Rinaldo Barlassina

23 November 1930 9	Juventus	1–2	Napoli	Turin
	Cesarini 76'	Report	2' Buscaglia; 25' Vojak I	Stadium: Campo Juventus; Referee: Carlo Dani

30 November 1930 10	Triestina	0–0	Juventus	Trieste
		Report		Stadium: Stadio Montebello; Referee: Albino Carraro

7 December 1930 11	Juventus	2–0	Bologna	Turin
	Ferrari 19'; Orsi 73' (pen.)	Report		Stadium: Campo Juventus; Referee: Rodolfo Zorzi

14 December 1930 12	Juventus	2–0	Torino	Turin
	Munerati 13'; Cesarini 26'	Report		Stadium: Campo Juventus; Referee: Felice Rovida

21 December 1930 13	Lazio	2–1	Juventus	Rome
	Pastore 20'; Cevenini V 74'	Report	51' Ferrari	Stadium: Stadio della Rondinella; Referee: Albino Carraro

4 January 1931 14	Modena	1–2	Juventus	Modena
	Piccaluga 52'	Report	32', 57' Munerati	Stadium: Ex Velodromo; Referee: Carlo Garbieri

11 January 1931 15	Juventus	3–0	Brescia	Turin
	Ferrari 44', 50'; Cesarini 65'	Report		Stadium: Campo Juventus; Referee: Carlo Tagliabue

18 January 1931 16	Ambrosiana	2–3	Juventus	Milan
	Vollono 11' (o.g.); Serantoni 81'	Report	4' Vecchina; 51' Cesarini; 72' Ferrari	Stadium: Arena Civica; Referee: Carlo Garbier

1 February 1931 17	Juventus	4–1	Livorno	Turin
	Ferrari 11', 62' (pen.); Vecchina 30'; Rier 89'	Report	88' Corsetti	Stadium: Campo Juventus; Referee: Enrico Dall'Era

8 February 1931 18	Pro Patria	1–3	Juventus	Busto Arsizio
	Dusi 28'	Report	25' (o.g.) Fizzotti; 34', 63' Orsi	Stadium: Stadium; Referee: Carlo Dani

15 February 1931 19	Juventus	3–3	Milan	Turin
	Ferrari 7'; Orsi 65' (pen.); Munerati 73'	Report	15' Torriani; 30' Magnozzi; 40' Arcari III	Stadium: Campo Juventus; Referee: Carlo Garbier

1 March 1931 20	Casale	0–1	Juventus	Casale Monferrato
		Report	64' Munerati	Stadium: Stadio Natale Palli; Referee: Rinaldo Barlassina

8 March 1931 21	Juventus	5–1	Pro Vercelli	Turin
	Orsi 40'; Vecchina 41', 70', 80'; Cesarini 55'	Report	23' Casalino	Stadium: Campo Juventus; Referee: Rinaldo Barlassina

15 March 1931 22	Roma	5–0	Juventus	Rome
	Lombardo 6'; Volk 50'; Bernardini 62' (pen.), 79'; Fasanelli 88'	Report		Stadium: Campo Testaccio; Referee: Albino Carraro

22 March 1931 23	Juventus	4–1	Genoa	Turin
	Vecchina 2', 27', 52'; Orsi 67' (pen.)	Report	70' Patri	Stadium: Campo Juventus; Referee: Felice Rovida

5 April 1931 24	Juventus	4–1	Alessandria	Turin
	Munerati 13', 15'; Orsi 79', 89'	Report	41' (o.g.) Caligaris	Stadium: Campo Juventus; Referee: Rinaldo Barlassina

26 April 1931 25	Legnano	1–2	Juventus	Legnano
	Cidri 76'	Report	30' Munerati; 85' Ferrari	Stadium: Stadio di via Carlo Pisacane; Referee: Cesare Lenti

3 May 1931 26	Napoli	1–2	Juventus	Naples
	Vojak I 31'	Report	48' Ferrari; 73' Vecchina	Stadium: Stadio Giorgio Ascarelli; Referee: Felice Rovida

10 May 1931 27	Juventus	4–0	Triestina	Turin
	Munerati 7'; Vecchina 34', 37'; Ferrari 45'	Report		Stadium: Campo Juventus; Referee: Mario Casetta

24 May 1931 28	Bologna	4–0	Juventus	Bologna
	Reguzzoni 21', 62', 67'; Ottani 89'	Report		Stadium: Stadio Littoriale; Referee: Amedeo Guarnieri

31 May 1931 29	Torino	1–1	Juventus	Turin
	Libonatti 78'	Report	27' Ferrari	Stadium: Campo Juventus; Referee: Carlo Dani

4 June 1931 30	Juventus	4–1	Modena	Turin
	Ferrari 16'; Orsi 23'; Rier 66'; Guandalini 72' (o.g.)	Report	79' Morselli	Stadium: Campo Juventus; Referee: Ermenegildo Melandri

7 June 1931 31	Juventus	3–1	Lazio	Turin
	Munerati 30'; Orsi 34'; Cesarini 62'	Report	53' Fantoni I	Stadium: Campo Juventus; Referee: Carlo Lenti

14 June 1931 32	Brescia	1–1	Juventus	Brescia
	Giuliani 61'	Report	32' Orsi	Stadium: Stadium di Viale Piave; Referee: Carlo Lenti

21 June 1931 33	Juventus	1–0	Ambrosiana	Turin
	Orsi 38'	Report		Stadium: Campo Juventus; Referee: Ermenegildo Melandri

28 June 1931 34	Livorno	1–1	Juventus	Livorno
	Castellani 40'	Report	8' Ferrari	Stadium: Villa Chayes; Referee: Carlo Dani

=== Mitropa Cup ===
==== Quarterfinals ====
12 July 1931	Juventus	2–1	(Czechoslovakia) Sparta Prague	Turin
	Cesarini 39'; Munerati 88'		60' Braine	Stadium: Campo Juventus; Referee: (Austria) Adolf Miesz

22 July 1931	(Czechoslovakia) Sparta Prague	1–0	Juventus	Prague
	Haftl 61'			Stadium: Stadion Letná; Referee: (Austria) Adolf Miesz

2 September 1931 Replay	(Czechoslovakia) Sparta Prague	3–2	Juventus	Vienna
	Podrazil 25'; Nejedlý 58'; Silný 70'		20' Orsi; 89' Ferrari	Stadium: Hohe Warte Stadion; Referee: (Czechoslovakia) Paul Ruoff

== Statistics ==
=== Squad statistics ===
Competition	Points	Home						Away						Total						GD
Competition	Points	G	W	D	L	Gs	Ga	G	W	D	L	Gs	Ga	G	W	D	L	Gs	Ga	GD
Serie A	55	17	15	1	1	50	14	17	10	4	3	29	23	34	25	5	4	79	37	+42
Mitropa Cup	-	1	1	0	0	2	1	2	0	0	2	2	4	3	1	0	2	4	5	-1
Total	-	18	16	1	1	52	15	19	10	4	5	31	27	37	26	5	6	83	42	+41

=== Players statistics ===
No.	Pos	Nat	Player	Total		1930-31 Serie A		1931 Mitropa Cup	
No.	Pos	Nat	Player	Apps	Goals	Apps	Goals	Apps	Goals
	GK	(Italy) ITA	Gianpiero Combi	29	-33	29	-33	0	0
	DF	(Italy) ITA	Umberto Caligaris	37	0	34	0	3	0
	DF	(Italy) ITA	Virginio Rosetta	31	0	28	0	3	0
	MF	(Italy) ITA	Oreste Barale	22	0	22	0	0	0
	MF	(Italy) ITA	Mario Varglien	36	1	33	1	3	0
	FW	(Argentina) ARG	Renato Cesarini	32	9	29	8	3	1
	FW	(Italy) ITA	Giovanni Ferrari	37	17	34	16	3	1
	FW	(Italy) ITA	Federico Munerati	35	14	33	13	2	1
	FW	(Argentina) ARG	Raimundo Orsi	36	21	33	20	3	1
	FW	(Italy) ITA	Francesco Rier	28	2	28	2	0	0
	FW	(Italy) ITA	Giovanni Vecchina	34	16	31	16	3	0
	GK	(Italy) ITA	Umberto Ghibaudo	4	-3	4	-3	0	0
	MF	(Italy) ITA	Aldo Vollono	10	0	10	0	0	0
	MF	(Italy) ITA	Lino Mosca	7	0	7	0	0	0
	DF	(Italy) ITA	Mario Ferrero	6	0	6	0	0	0
	MF	(Italy) ITA	Giovanni Varglien	8	0	6	0	2	0
	MF	(Italy) ITA	Carlo Bigatto	1	0	1	0	0	0
	GK	(Italy) ITA	Alfredo Bodoira	1	-1	1	-1	0	0
	MF	(Argentina) ARG	Eugenio Castellucci	1	0	1	0	0	0
	FW	(Italy) ITA	Carlo Crotti	1	0	1	0	0	0
	FW	(Italy) ITA	Gilberto Pogliano	1	0	1	0	0	0
	FW	(Italy) ITA	Oliviero Vojak	1	0	1	0	0	0
	FW	(Italy) ITA	Luigi Bertolini	3	0	0	0	3	0
	FW	(Argentina) ARG	José Maglio	1	0	0	0	1	0
	FW	(Argentina) ARG	Luis Monti	1	0	0	0	1	0
	FW	(Italy) ITA	Ezio Sclavi	3	-5	0	0	3	-5

- Source: http://calcio-seriea.net/rose/1930/25/

== See also ==
- Fabrizio Melegari. Almanacco illustrato del calcio - La storia 1898-2004. Modena. Panini, 2004.
- Carlo F. Chiesa. "Il grande romanzo dello scudetto", from «Calcio 2000» - years 2002 and 2003
