= 1932–33 FBC Juventus season =

Italian football club season

Foot-Ball Club Juventus
1932–33 season
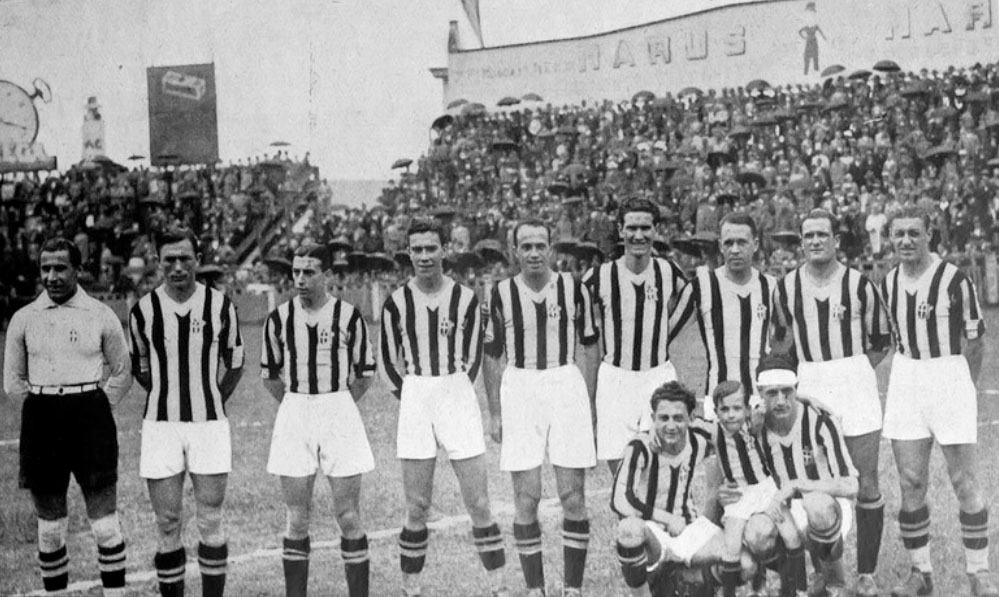
- President: Giovanni Agnelli
- Manager: Carlo Carcano
- Stadium: Stadio di Corso Marsiglia
- Serie A: 1st (in Mitropa Cup)
- Mitropa Cup: Semi-finals
- Top goalscorer: League: Felice Borel (29); All: Felice Borel (30)
Home colours

During the 1932–33 season Foot-Ball Club Juventus competed in Serie A and the Mitropa Cup.

== Summary ==
The team conquered in 1932–33 Serie A the third title in a row, its fifth ever with the fewest number of draws (only four) in their history until the 1994–95 campaign. In the Mitropa Cup the club reached the semi-finals, defeated by Austria Vienna in the first series ever against an Austrian team. In the summer, couch Carlo Carcano started looking to the market to reinforce the squad.

New players make a difference in this season with Defender Duilio Santagostino, midfielder, Mario Genta. Forward Francesco Imberti, was released but a young striker with only 18 years old Felice Placido Borel will become a legend in the club.

Also, in this season the club left Campo di Corso Marsiglia and inaugurated a new field Stadio Benito Mussolini with a bigger capacity.

== Squad ==
Note: Flags indicate national team as defined under FIFA eligibility rules; some limited exceptions apply. Players may hold more than one non-FIFA nationality.

| Pos. | Nation | Player |
|---|---|---|
| GK | ITA | Gianpiero Combi |
| DF | ITA | Umberto Caligaris |
| DF | ITA | Mario Ferrero |
| DF | ITA | Virginio Rosetta (Captain) |
| DF | ITA | Duilio Santagostino |
| DF | ITA | Varglien II |
| DF | ITA | Luigi Bertolini |
| DF | ITA | Mario Genta |
| DF | ARG | Luis Monti |

| Pos. | Nation | Player |
|---|---|---|
| MF | ITA | Varglien I |
| MF | ITA | Borel II |
| MF | ARG | Renato Cesarini |
| MF | ITA | Giovanni Ferrari |
| MF | ITA | Francesco Imberti (footballer) |
| MF | ITA | Federico Munerati |
| FW | ARG | Raimundo Orsi |
| FW | ITA | Pietro Sernagiotto |
| FW | ITA | Giovanni Vecchina |

== Competitions ==
=== Serie A ===
==== League table ====
| Pos | Team | Pld | W | D | L | GF | GA | GD | Pts | Qualification or relegation |
|---|---|---|---|---|---|---|---|---|---|---|
| 1 | Juventus (C) | 34 | 25 | 4 | 5 | 83 | 23 | +60 | 54 | 1933 Mitropa Cup |
| 2 | Ambrosiana-Inter | 34 | 19 | 8 | 7 | 80 | 53 | +27 | 46 | 1933 Mitropa Cup |
| 3 | Bologna | 34 | 15 | 12 | 7 | 69 | 33 | +36 | 42 | |
| 3 | Napoli | 34 | 18 | 6 | 10 | 64 | 38 | +26 | 42 | |
| 5 | Roma | 34 | 14 | 11 | 9 | 58 | 35 | +23 | 39 | |

Source: Panini
(C) Champions

==== Matches ====
| 18 September 1932 1 | Alessandria | 3–2 | Juventus | Alessandria |
| | Cattaneo 23', 38'; Scagliotti 64' | Report | 69' Vecchina; 86' (pen.) Orsi | Stadium: Stadio del Littorio; Referee: Melandri |

| 25 September 1932 2 | Juventus | 3–1 | Padova | Turin |
| | Cesarini 16', 28'; Ferrari 67' | Report | Spivach 48' | Stadium: Campo di Corso Marsiglia; Referee: Dell'Era |

| 2 October 1932 3 | Napoli | 1–0 | Juventus | Naples |
| | Sallustro 53' | Report | | Stadium: Stadio Partenopeo; Referee: Albino Carraro |

| 25 September 1932 4 | Juventus | 1–0 | Roma | Turin |
| | Cesarini 20' | Report | | Stadium: Campo di Corso Marsiglia; Referee: Ciamberlini |

| 16 October 1932 5 | Pro Vercelli | 0–2 | Juventus | Vercelli |
| | | Report | Varglien I 52'; Munerati 74' | Stadium: Stadio Foro Boario; Referee: Caironi |

| 23 October 1932 6 | Juventus | 2–0 | Pro Patria | Turin |
| 15:00 | Munerati 29'; Ferrari 82' | Report | | Stadium: Campo di Corso Marsiglia; Referee: Bonivento |

| 6 November 1932 7 | Bari | 0–4 | Juventus | Bari |
| | | Report | 15', 18' Cesarini; 46' Orsi; 88' Ferrari | Stadium: Campo degli Sport; Referee: Casati |

| 13 November 1932 8 | Casale | 1–2 | Juventus | Casale Monferrato |
| | Celoria 57' (pen.) | Report | 25' Monti; 70' Orsi | Stadium: Stadio Natale Palli; Referee: Ciamberlini |

| 20 November 1932 9 | Juventus | 4–0 | Lazio | Turin |
| | Borel 10', 40'; Munerati 54'; Cesarini 90' | Report | | Stadium: Campo di Corso Marsiglia |

| 4 December 1932 10 | Torino | 0–1 | Juventus | Turin |
| | | Report | 67' Borel | Stadium: Stadio Filadelfia; Referee: Barlassina |

| 11 December 1932 11 | Juventus | 6–1 | Triestina | Turin |
| | Sernagiotto 21'; Borel 32', 58', 66'; Ferrari 41'; Orsi 73' (pen.) | Report | 81' Rosa | Stadium: Campo di Corso Marsiglia; Referee: Casati |

| 18 December 1932 12 | Juventus | 3–0 | Ambrosiana-Inter | Turin |
| | Sernagiotto 13'; Orsi 31' (pen.); Varglien I 52' | Report | | Stadium: Campo di Corso Marsiglia |

| 8 January 1933 13 | Fiorentina | 1–0 | Juventus | Florence |
| 14:30 | Petrone 75' | Report | | Stadium: Stadio Giovanni Berta; Referee: Mazzarini |

| 15 January 1933 14 | Juventus | 2–2 | Bologna | Turin |
| | Borel 32'; Varglien I 73' | Report | 22' (pen.) Monzeglio; 29' Fedullo | Stadium: Campo di Corso Marsiglia |

| 22 January 1933 15 | Milan | 1–1 | Juventus | Milan |
| | Moretti 62' | Report | 46' Borel | Stadium: Stadio San Siro; Referee: Turbiani |

| 29 January 1933 16 | Juventus | 4–1 | Genoa | Turin |
| | Orsi 13'; Sernagiotto 56'; Ferrari 75'; Vecchina 86' | Report | 13' Esposto | Stadium: Campo di Corso Marsiglia |

| 5 February 1933 17 | Palermo | 0–2 | Juventus | Palermo |
| | | Report | 4', 79' Monti | Stadium: Stadio Littorio; Referee: Dell'Era |

| 19 February 1933 18 | Juventus | 3–0 | Alessandria | Turin |
| | Ferrari 49'; Borel 63'; Orsi 87' (pen.) | Report | | Stadium: Campo di Corso Marsiglia; Referee: Ciamberlini |

| 26 February 1933 19 | Padova | 1–1 | Juventus | Padua |
| 15:00 | Spivach 51' | Report | 83' Ferrari | Stadium: Stadio Silvio Appiani |

| 5 March 1933 20 | Juventus | 3–0 | Napoli | Turin |
| | Borel 14', 57'; Sernagiotto 15' | Report | | Stadium: Campo di Corso Marsiglia; Referee: Caironi |

| 12 March 1933 21 | Roma | 0–1 | Juventus | Rome |
| 15:00 | | Report | 46' Borel | Stadium: Campo Testaccio |

| 19 March 1933 22 | Juventus | 4–2 | Pro Vercelli | Turin |
| 15:00 | Orsi 28' (pen.); Ferrari 46'; Varglien II 68'; Borel 74' | Report | 23' Casalino; 25' Cerutti | Stadium: Campo di Corso Marsiglia; Referee: Albino Carraro |

| 26 March 1933 23 | Pro Patria | 0–2 | Juventus | Busto Arsizio |
| | | Report | 16', 83' Borel | Stadium: Stadio Comunale; Referee: Scorzoni |

| 9 April 1933 24 | Juventus | 2–0 | Bari | Turin |
| 15:00 | Borel 22'; Monti 38' | Report | | Stadium: Campo di Corso Marsiglia; Referee: Gianelli |

| 16 April 1933 25 | Juventus | 6–0 | Casale | Turin |
| 15:00 | Ferrari 36', 61', 90'; Monti 52'; Borel 80', 82' | Report | | Stadium: Campo di Corso Marsiglia; Referee: Barlassina |

| 23 April 1933 26 | Lazio | 1–0 | Juventus | Roma |
| | Fantoni 14' | Report | | Stadium: Stadio Nazionale del P.N.F. Referee: Scorzoni |

| 30 April 1933 27 | Juventus | 2–1 | Torino | Turin |
| 15:30 | Varglien II 27'; Borel 70' | Report | 13' Busoni | Stadium: Campo di Corso Marsiglia |

| 21 May 1933 28 | Triestina | 0–1 | Juventus | Trieste |
| | | Report | 78' Borel | Stadium: Stadio Littorio; Referee: Melandri |

| 25 May 1993 29 | Ambrosiana-Inter | 2–2 | Juventus | Milan |
| 15:30 | 60' Meazza; 77' Levratto | Report | 20' Varglien II; 71' Sernagiotto | Stadium: Arena Civica; Referee: Melandri |

| 28 May 1933 30 | Juventus | 5–0 | Fiorentina | Turin |
| 15:30 | Monti 15'; Borel 33', 62', 63'; Orsi 34' | Report | | Stadium: Campo di Corso Marsiglia; Referee: Ciamberlini |

| 4 June 1933 31 | Bologna | 1–2 | Juventus | Bologna |
| | Schiavio 65' | Report | 21' Borel; 80' Orsi | Stadium: Stadio Littoriale; Referee: Carraro |

| 11 June 1933 32 | Juventus | 3–0 | Milan | Turin |
| 15:30 | Borel 16', 67'; Sernagiotto 59' | Report | | Stadium: Campo di Corso Marsiglia; Referee: Dattilo |

| 15 June 1933 34 | Juventus | 5–0 | Palermo | Turin |
| 15:30 | Cesarini 7'; Borel 44', 64', 84'; Sernagiotto 45' | Report | | Stadium: Campo di Corso Marsiglia |

| 18 June 1933 33 | Genoa | 3–2 | Juventus | Genoa |
| 15:30 | Esposto 14', 22', 50' | Report | 5' Cesarini; 88' Rosetta | Stadium: Campo Marassi |

== Statistics ==
=== Goalscorers ===
30 goals

- (Italy) Felice Borel

15 goals

- (Italy) (Argentina) Raimundo Orsi

12 goals

- (Italy) Giovanni Ferrari

8 goals

- (Italy) (Argentina) Renato Cesarini
- (Italy) (Brazil) Pietro Sernagiotto

6 goals

- (Italy) (Argentina) Luis Monti
- (Italy) Giovanni Varglien

3 goals

- (Italy) Federico Munerati
- (Italy) Mario Varglien

2 goals

- (Italy) Giovanni Vecchina

1 goal

- (Italy) Virginio Rosetta
