= Gianpiero Combi =

Italian footballer (1902–1956)

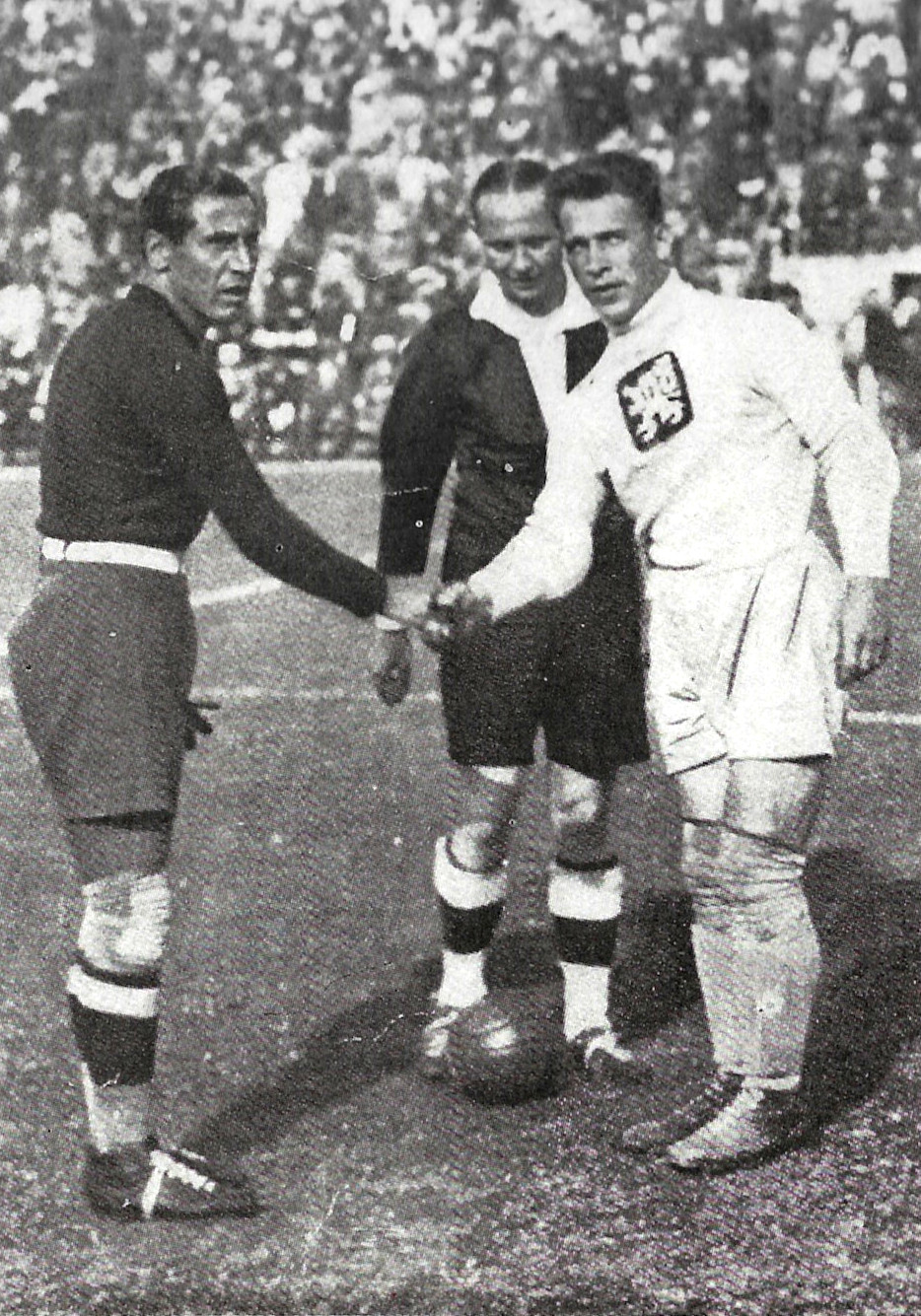
- Combi (left) together with referee Ivan Eklind (m.) and František Plánička (r.) before the 1934 FIFA World Cup Final

Personal information
- Date of birth: 20 November 1902
- Place of birth: Turin, Italy
- Date of death: 12 August 1956 (aged 53)
- Place of death: Imperia, Italy
- Height: 1.74 m (5 ft 8 1/2 in)
- Position: Goalkeeper

Senior career*
Years	Team	Apps	(Gls)
1921–1934	Juventus	367	(0)

International career
1924–1934	Italy	47	(0)
Medal record
Italy
Summer Olympics
Bronze medal – third place	1928 Amsterdam
Central European International Cup
Gold medal – first place	1927–30 Central European International Cup
Central European International Cup
Silver medal – second place	1931–32 Central European International Cup
FIFA World Cup
Gold medal – first place	1934 Italy
Central European International Cup
Gold medal – first place	1933–35 Central European International Cup
- * Club domestic league appearances and goals

Gianpiero Combi (Italian pronunciation: [dʒamˈpjɛːro ˈkombi]; 20 November 1902 – 12 August 1956) was an Italian footballer who played as a goalkeeper. He spent his entire club career at Juventus, where he won five Italian League titles. At international level, he won the 1934 World Cup with the Italy national team, as well as two Central European International Cups (in 1930 and 1935), and an Olympic bronze medal in 1928.

Combi was considered one of the best goalkeepers in the world during the 1930s, alongside Ricardo Zamora and František Plánička, and is regarded as one of Italy's best ever goalkeepers; in a 1999 IFFHS poll, he was elected Italy's second best goalkeeper of the twentieth century, behind only Dino Zoff, and the sixteenth greatest European goalkeeper of the century, alongside Rinat Dasayev.

== Club career ==
Combi was born in Turin on 20 November 1902 and played for Juventus' youth side; he debuted in the Italian Serie A on 5 February 1922 in a match against Milan. Combi spent his entire club career with Juventus FC; he played 351 games in Serie A, winning five titles – in 1926 (having conceded only 18 goals during the season), 1931, 1932, 1933 and 1934 as part of the first golden age of the club with a record of five championship victories in a row, a feat known as Il Quinquennio d'Oro (The Golden Quinquennium).

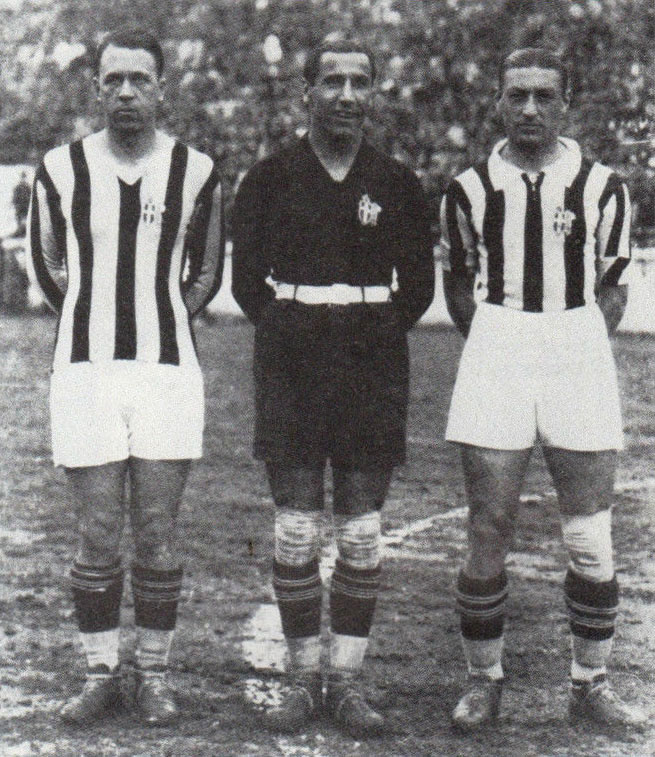
Virginio Rosetta, Combi and Umberto Caligaris with Juventus in the early 1930s

Along with Virginio Rosetta and Umberto Caligaris, Combi formed a formidable defensive wall (known in Italy as the Trio Combi-Rosetta-Caligaris) for both Juventus and the Italy national team. He played his last match in Serie A on 15 April 1934, in a 2–1 win over Brescia. In total Combi played for 13 seasons with Juventus, totaling 348 Serie A matches and another 16 games in the Central European Cup, an international competition for clubs where Juventus played four consecutive semi-finals from 1932 to 1935 to claim the record for most appearances by a goalkeeper for the club (370), a record he held for more than 40 years until Dino Zoff overtook him in the 1970s (476 matches), followed by Stefano Tacconi in the 1980s (377 matches), and subsequently Gianluigi Buffon.

== International career ==
Combi's first match for the Italy national team was in Budapest, at the age of 21, on 6 April 1924 in a 7–1 loss against Hungary. He returned in Azzurro a year and seven games later when the technical commission, made up of Rangone, Giuseppe Milano and Baccani selected him to play against France in Turin on 22 March 1925. This match was played in Corso Marsiglia Stadium and this time the large score was in favor of the Azzurri, a victory of 7–0. After this match Combi never looked back and for the next ten years it was extremely rare to see another goalkeeper defending the Italian posts.

The 1928 Olympic Games were held in Amsterdam and this time Combi formed part of the squad and defended the Italian squad for the rest of the tournament: Quarter Final against Spain 1–1 after extra time, quarter-final replay against Spain 7–1, semi-final against Uruguay (3–2 loss) and third-place final against Egypt 11–3. With this result on 10 June 1928 in the Olympisch Stadion of Amsterdam, the Azzurri won their first honour: the Bronze Medal of the 9th edition of the Olympic games.

Other triumphs followed, the next being the winning of the inaugural Central European International Cup, a predecessor cup of the European Nations Cup held between the National teams of Central Europe. In these matches Italy lost against Matěj Šindelář's Austria 3–0 in Vienna but won all the others, against Switzerland 3–2 in Zürich, against Czechoslovakia 4–2 in Bologna and the last match against Hungary on 11 May 1930.

Combi made his debut as the Italian captain in his 33rd game on 15 November 1931.

=== The 1934 World Cup ===
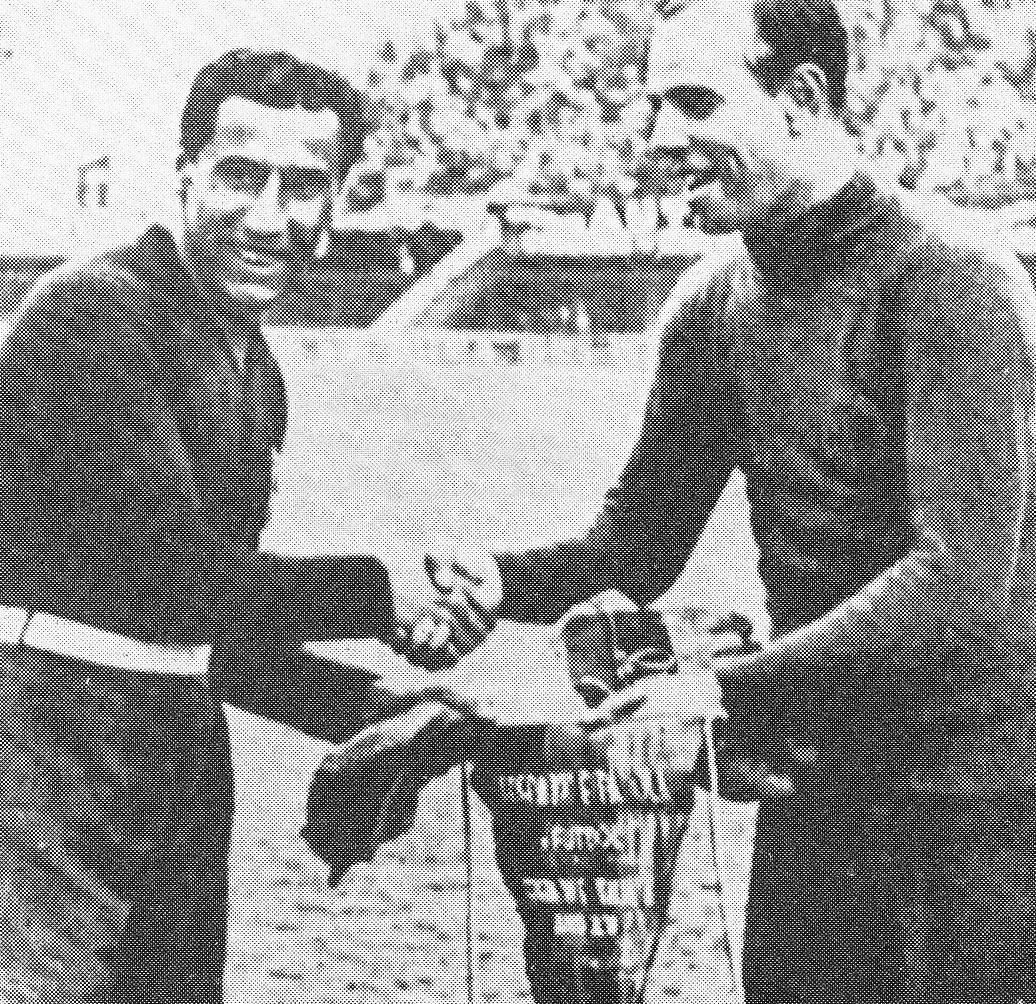
Combi (left) as Italian goalkeeper and captain in the 1934 World Cup, here with his Spanish colleague Ricardo Zamora in the Quarter-finals.

Around the beginning of 1934, 31-year-old Gianpiero Combi was preparing to retire from football. In this season he was on the way to winning his fifth Italian championship (a record fourth in a row) with Juventus and he had played more than 40 games for the national team. A new promising young goalkeeper was emerging: Carlo Ceresoli, who played for Inter. On his debut Ceresoli had helped the national team to qualify for the 1934 FIFA World Cup which was held in Italy that summer, by eliminating Greece in Milan by a 4–0 win. But the National Coach Vittorio Pozzo included Combi in the Italian squad - he was also one of the Nazio-Juve members - and was asked by Pozzo to postpone his retirement until the end of the tournament as his experience might be a great help. During a training session a few weeks before the beginning of the tournament, a shot by Pietro Arcari broke one of Ceresoli's forearms. This forced him to miss the World Cup and Combi again found himself the top goalkeeper in Italy, with the responsibility of leading the Azzurri to their debut in football's premier competition.

The first match was on 27 May 1934 when Italy played the first round of the World Cup in the Stadio Nazionale of the P.N.F. in Rome against the United States. The Azzurri beat their opponents 7–1, a victory provided by a hat trick from Angelo Schiavio, a double from Raimundo Orsi and a goal each from Giovanni Ferrari and Meazza. In the Quarter-finals the Italians met Spain, who were led by another great goalkeeper of the time, Ricardo Zamora. The game was played on 31 May 1934 in the Stadio Comunale "Giovanni Berta" of Florence. The game against the Spanish team was a very difficult one, dominated by the speed and force used by both teams and finished in a 1–1 draw after extra time. A replay had to be played the next day, in which Italy changed four players and Spain seven. Italy won 1–0 with a goal by Meazza.

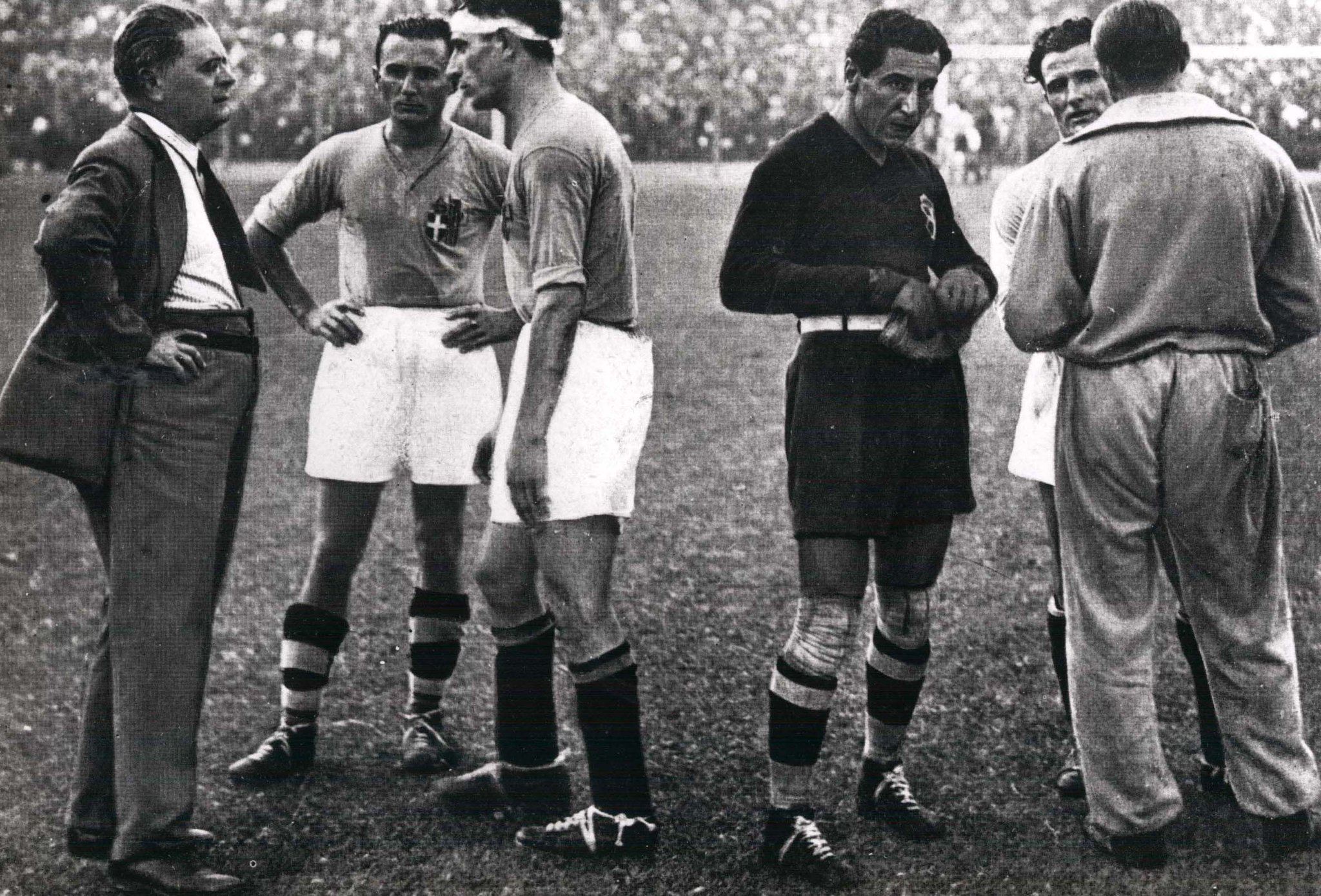
From left to right: Italian manager Pozzo, Monzeglio, Bertolini, Combi, Monti (half-hidden) and the assistant manager Carcano (behind) before the start of extra time in the victorious final versus Czechoslovakia.

Their semi-final opponents were the Austrian Wunderteam, the squad who had beaten the Italians 4–2 in Turin four months earlier. The match was played in Milan's Stadio Calcistico San Siro on 3 June and the Azzurri won 1–0 with a goal by Enrico Guaita. Combi was also decisive when he made two miraculous saves to keep the score in favor of Italy until the end. The final was held in Rome on 10 June 1934 against Czechoslovakia. The first half finished without a goal but in the 71st minute, against all odds, Antonin Puč managed to beat the Italian goalkeeper. Ten minutes later Orsi equalized and the game went to extra-time. With the help of a noisy support, so great that the rival coach Pozzo had to continually run along the pitch so that the players could hear his instructions, Italy won the match through a goal by Schiavio and the Italian team were crowned World Champions. Gianpiero Combi, who played 510 minutes and conceded three goals as captain of the squad, received the Jules Rimet trophy from the Italian Dictator Benito Mussolini.

== End of career and retirement ==
A year later, in November 1935, Combi played only five of the eight matches in the International Cup and in his absence the Italian team won the trophy. He totalled 47 caps for the Italian team, five of which were as captain.

Although he had stopped playing football, his passion for the sport remained all his life and he still held a number of unofficial positions with Juventus. He offered advice to the technical staff and also served as a scout. In 1951 the Italian Football Federation offered him the job of technical commissioner for the Italy national team with Carlino Beretta and Toni Busini. They led the National Team for seven months, from 8 April to 25 November 1951 in which time the Italian squad played 5 games without any losses. They won 4–1 against Portugal and France, and drew against Yugoslavia (0–0), Sweden (1–1) and Switzerland (1–1) - the only competitive game of the five.

He died in Imperia on 12 August 1956, aged 53.

== Style of play ==
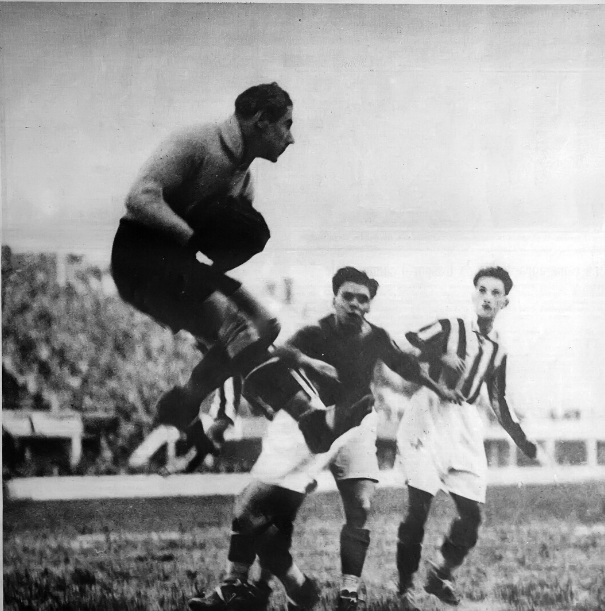
Combi in action with Bianconeri in 1928

Despite his relatively small stature for a player in his position, Combi was a commanding keeper, who possessed notable strength, which he combined with his elegance, agility, intelligence, shot-stopping ability, positional sense, and excellent technique; throughout his career, he stood out in particular due to his consistency, efficient goalkeeping style, and composure, rather than flamboyance, even though he was capable of producing spectacular diving saves when necessary. He is regarded as one of the greatest goalkeepers of all time.

== Records ==
- Combi is the first goalkeeper to win four Italian Championships in a row.
- He played the 9th most games for Juventus in the Italian League, and the 24th most in all competitions; he is the goalkeeper with the fourth-most appearances for Juventus (370), behind Stefano Tacconi, Dino Zoff, and Gianluigi Buffon.
- Combi kept an unbeaten streak for 934 consecutive minutes during the 1925–26 season, which was a record in the Italian Football Championship, until it was bettered by Gianluigi Buffon, who went unbeaten for 974 minutes during the 2015–16 Serie A season.

== Honours ==
=== Club ===
Juventus

- Serie A: 1925–26, 1930–31, 1931–32, 1932–33, 1933–34

=== International ===
Italy

- FIFA World Cup: 1934
- Central European International Cup: 1927–30, 1933–35; Runner-up: 1931–32
- Summer Olympics: Bronze Medal 1928

=== Individual ===
- Juventus FC Hall of Fame: 2025

== Trivia ==
- Gianpiero Combi, Dino Zoff (1982), Iker Casillas (2010) and Hugo Lloris (2018), are the only goalkeepers to have won the FIFA World Cup as captain of their national teams.
- Combi, alongside František Plánička, was one of the only two goalkeepers-captains at the same World Cup final.
- He was also known in Italy as Uomo di Gomma (the Rubber Man) due to his agility and his carefree but secure saves.
- For the 1980 European Championship in Italy, the idea to change the name of the major stadium in Turin, the Stadio Comunale, was being considered by the Comune. Juventus proposed the name Stadio Gianpiero Combi, but the idea was finally abandoned and the stadium remained with its previous name.

== See also ==
- One-club man
