= Vojak =

Vojak is a surname literally meaning "soldier" in some Slavic languages. Notable people with the surname include:

- Antonio Vojak (1904–1975), Italian footballer
- Oliviero Vojak (1911–1932), Italian footballer, brother of Antonio

== See also ==
- Vojak, Rijeka, a section of Rijeka, Croatia
