= Renato Cesarini =

Italian-Argentine football player and coach (1906–1969)

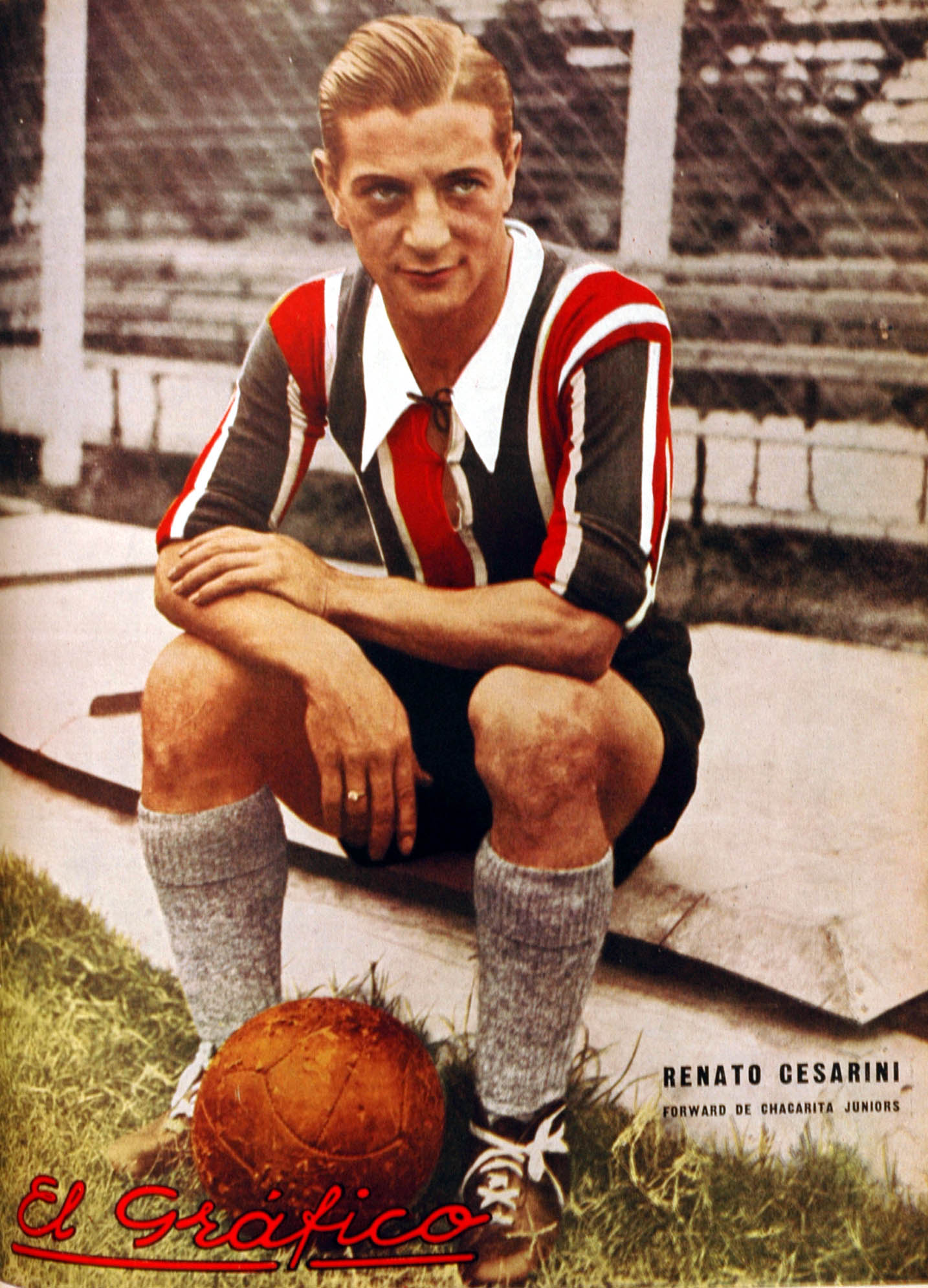
- Cesarini during his run on Chacarita Juniors in 1936

Personal information
- Full name: Renato Cesarini
- Date of birth: 11 April 1906
- Place of birth: Senigallia, Italy
- Date of death: 24 March 1969 (aged 62)
- Place of death: Buenos Aires, Argentina
- Position: Midfielder

Senior career*
Years	Team	Apps	(Gls)
1924–1928	Chacarita Juniors	82	(50)
1928	Alvear	?	(?)
1929	Club Ferrocarril Midland	?	(?)
1929	Chacarita Juniors	11	(7)
1929–1935	Juventus	128	(46)
1936	Chacarita Juniors	8	(3)
1936–1937	River Plate	23	(7)

International career
1926	Argentina	2	(1)
1931–1934	Italy	11	(3)

Managerial career
- 1939–1944: River Plate
- 1946–1948: Juventus
- 1949: Banfield
- 1950: Boca Juniors
- 1964–1965: Pumas UNAM
- 1958–1959: Pordenone
- 1967–1968: Argentina
- 1968: Huracán
Medal record
Italy
Central European International Cup
Silver medal – second place	1931–32 Central European International Cup
Central European International Cup
Gold medal – first place	1933–35 Central European International Cup
- * Club domestic league appearances and goals

Renato Cesarini (Italian pronunciation: [reˈnaːto tʃezaˈriːni]; 11 April 1906 – 24 March 1969) was an Italian Argentine football player and coach who most notably played for Juventus in Italy as a midfielder or forward. He was a dual international footballer and played for both the Argentina and Italy national teams. While playing for Italy, he was part of the successful runner-up 1931–32 Central European International Cup and gold winning 1933–35 Central European International Cup campaigns.

== Playing career ==
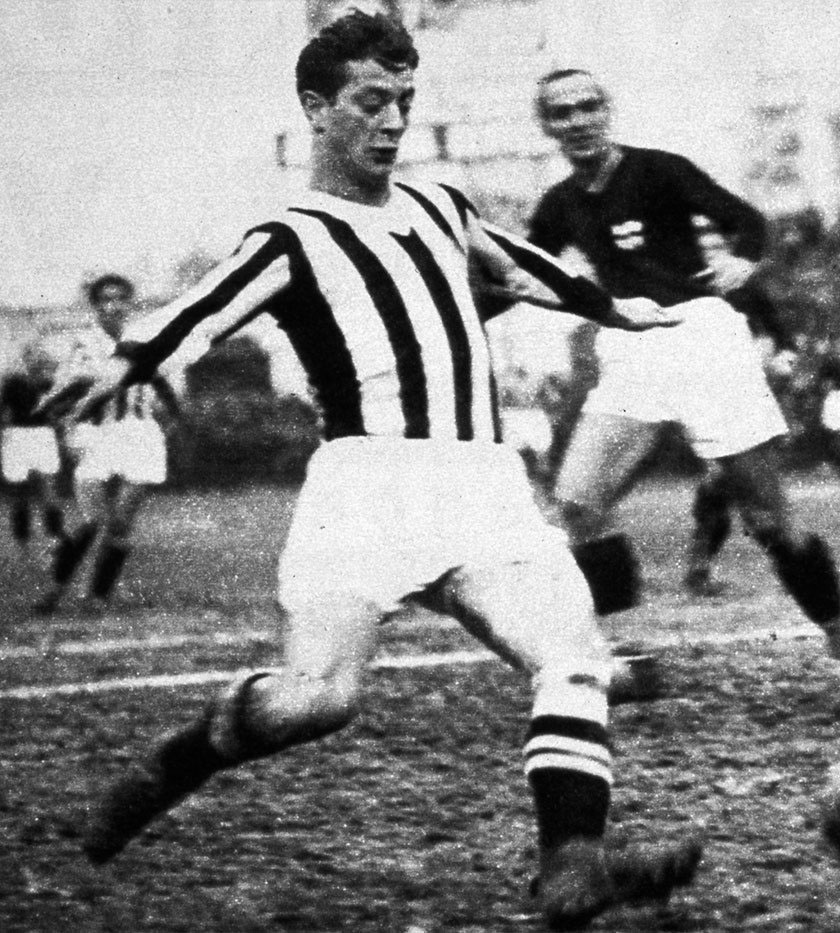
Cesarini in action with Juventus in the 1933–34 Serie A

Cesarini was born in Senigallia, near Ancona, in the Italian region of Marche, but when he was only a few months old he and his family emigrated to Buenos Aires, Argentina.

In his early career, he played for several clubs around the Buenos Aires area, during the amateur era in Argentine football, most notably Chacarita Juniors.

Cesarini was signed by Italian giants Juventus in 1929, he made his debut against Napoli on 23 March 1930: the game ended in a 2–2 draw. He went on to win five league championships in a row with the club.

In 1936, he returned to the professionalised Argentine league where he won two championships with River Plate. This excellent River Plate team included two young players who would become legends of the game Adolfo Pedernera and José Manuel Moreno. The team was coached by the Hungarian Emerico Hirschel, who had a big influence on Cesarini and his teammate Carlos Peucelle, which would be put to use in the 1940s as they took charge at the club.

== Managerial career ==
After retiring as a player, Cesarini went on to become a football manager. He coached a number of clubs in Argentina including both Boca Juniors and River Plate. With River, he coached one of the greatest teams of all time.

From 1941 to 1947, that River Plate team achieved legendary status: Cesarini was coach from 1941 to 1944 when the level of football was such that they became known as La Máquina (The Machine); the forward line of Moreno, Pedernera, Munoz, Labruna and Loustau is considered to this day to be the greatest seen in South America. River won Argentine league titles in 1941, and 1942 under La Biblia del fútbol as Cesarini became known for his authority on all matters pertaining to the sport.

He returned to Italy to coach Juventus where he led a team including Sivori, Charles and Boniperti to Serie A success. In the mid sixties, he started the underage club of Pumas today one of the top clubs in Mexico. Between 1967 and 1968, he coached the Argentina national team.

== Honours ==
=== Club ===
Juventus

- Serie A: 1930–31, 1931–32, 1932–33, 1933–34, 1934–35

River Plate

- Argentine Primera División: 1936, 1937
- Copa Aldao: 1936

=== International ===
Italy

- Central European International Cup: 1933–35; Runner-up: 1931–32

== Legacy ==
- The Italian expression zona Cesarini ("Cesarini zone") was originated as a reference to Renato Cesarini, who often scored decisive goals during the last minutes of the match (the best example being the Italy 3–2 Hungary match of 13 December 1931 at Stadio Filadelfia of Turin). This expression is still in use today in Italian football and it designates a goal that is scored in the final minutes of a match, namely in zona Cesarini.
- Cesarini has a football club (Club Renato Cesarini) and training academy in Argentina named in his honour, it was founded in 1975 by former members of the Argentina national team.

== See also ==
- Oriundo
- Club Renato Cesarini
