= Stadio di Corso Marsiglia =

Former multisports stadium in Turin, Italy

Coordinates: 45°03′08″N 7°39′00″E

Campo Juventus
- Stadio di Corso Marsiglia
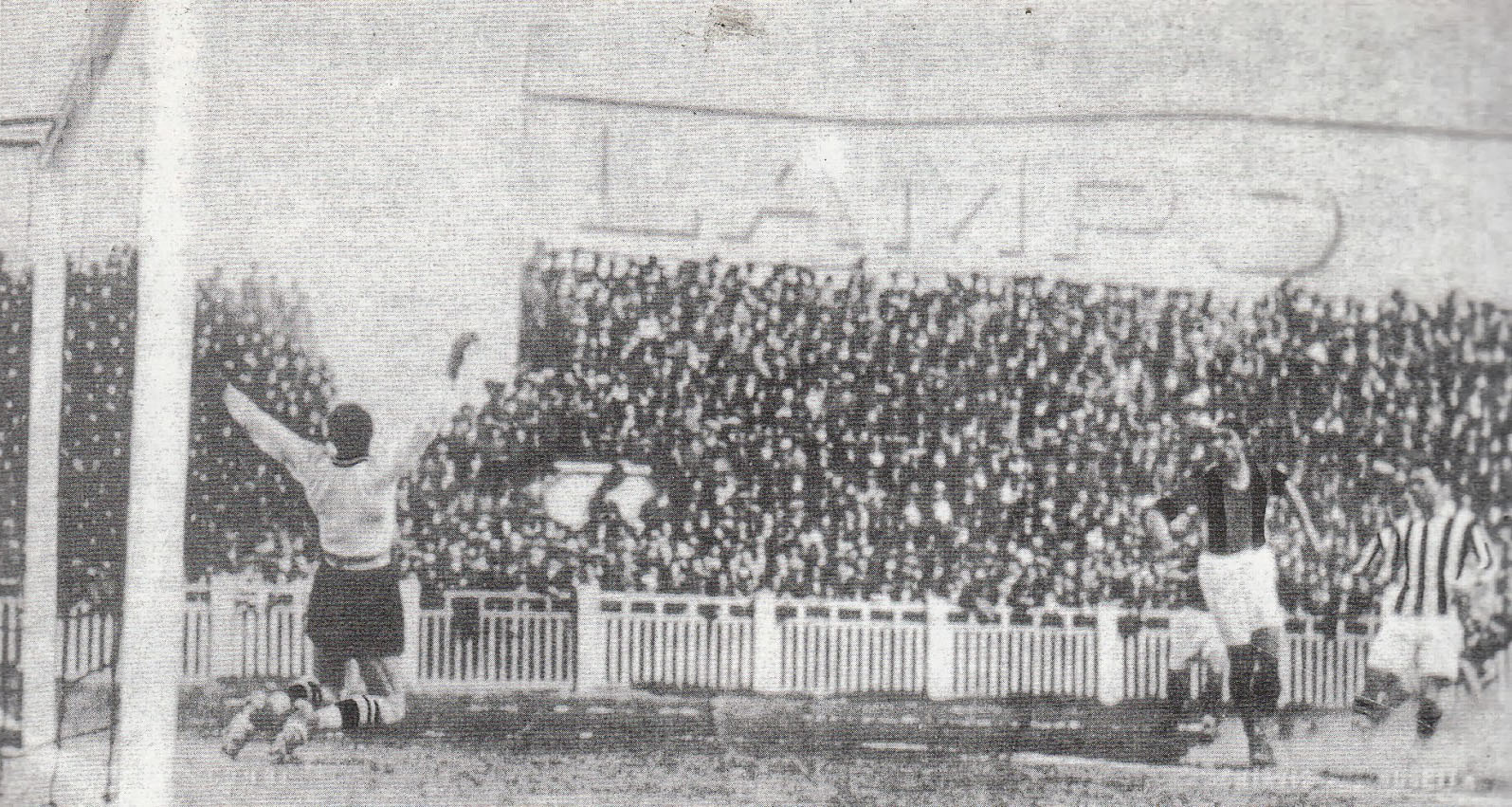
- Interactive map of Campo Juventus
- Location: Turin, Italy
- Owner: Juventus
- Capacity: 15,000

Construction
- Opened: 1922
- Demolished: 1939

Tenant
- Foot-ball Club Juventus

The Stadio di Corso Marsiglia (officially Campo Juventus) was a multisports stadium located in Turin (Italy). It was designed by architect Amedeo Lavini.

The first Italian sportive stadium with artificial light and built in reinforced concrete, it was home to Italian giants Foot-Ball Club Juventus between 1922 (The first game played at Corso Marsiglia was between Juventus and Modena for the Federal Championship, which the Torinese side won 4–0) and 1933, the year in which Juventus transferred to Stadio Mussolini. During these years the club won four national titles, including winning three consecutively (1926, 1931, 1932 and 1933).
