= Francesco Imberti =

Francesco Imberti may refer to:

- Francesco Imberti (bishop) (1882–1967), Italian Roman Catholic bishop
- Francesco Imberti (footballer) (1912–2008), Italian footballer
