= Alfredo Bodoira =

Italian footballer (1911-1989)

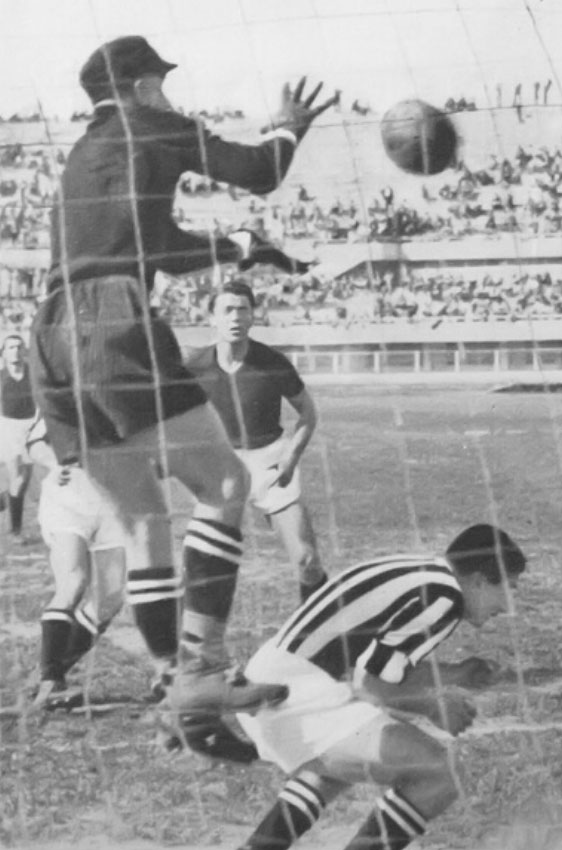
- Bodoira in the 1937–38 Coppa Italia Final

Personal information
- Date of birth: 28 August 1911
- Place of birth: Mathi, Italy
- Date of death: 3 August 1989 (aged 77)
- Place of death: Turin, Italy
- Height: 1.73 m (5 ft 8 in)
- Position: Goalkeeper

Senior career*
Years	Team	Apps	(Gls)
1930–1941	Juventus	82	(0)
1933–1936	→ Anconitana (loan)	80	(0)
1941–1944	Torino	50	(0)
1944–1945	Lancia		
1945–1946	Torino	0	(0)
1946–1947	Alessandria	30	(0)
1947–1949	Cesena	62	(0)
- * Club domestic league appearances and goals

Alfredo Bodoira (28 August 1911 – 3 August 1989) was an Italian professional footballer who played as a goalkeeper.

== Career ==
Bodoira was notably a part of the Grande Torino side between 1941 and 1946. Aside from striker Guglielmo Gabetto, he is the only player to win the Italian championship with both Juventus FC (1931; he played for the club between 1930 and 1941) and cross-city rivals Torino F.C. (1943; he played with the club from 1941 to 1946). He also played for Anconitana, Alessandria, and Cesena throughout his career.

Following his retirement, he also coached Fossanese in the lower divisions between 1953 and 1954.

== Honours ==
Juventus F.C.

- Serie A champion: 1930–31.
- Coppa Italia winner: 1937–38.

Torino F.C.

- Serie A champion: 1942–43.
- Coppa Italia winner: 1942–43.
