= Carlo Carcano =

Italian footballer and manager (1891-1965)

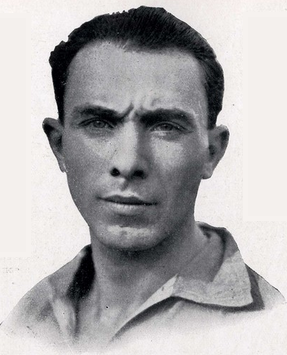
- Carcano in 1920

Personal information
- Date of birth: 26 February 1891
- Place of birth: Varese, Italy
- Date of death: 23 June 1965 (aged 74)
- Place of death: Sanremo, Italy
- Position: Central midfielder

Senior career*
Years	Team	Apps	(Gls)
1913–1915	US Alessandria		
1915–1916	Internazionale (loan)	2	(0)
1916–1924	US Alessandria		
1924–1925	Atalanta	7	(0)
1925–1926	Internaples	8	(0)

International career
1915–1921	Italy	5	(1)

Managerial career
- 1925–1926: Internaples
- 1926–1930: US Alessandria
- 1928–1929: Italy
- 1930–1934: Juventus
- 1934–1935: Genoa (assistant trainer)
- 1945–1946: Internazionale
- 1948: Internazionale
- 1949: Atalanta
- * Club domestic league appearances and goals

Carlo Carcano (Italian pronunciation: [ˈkarlo ˈkarkano]; 26 February 1891 – 23 June 1965) was an Italian footballer and manager who played as a midfielder.

== Club career ==
Carcano was born in Varese. As a player, he was a one club man, playing for Alessandria.

== International career ==
At international level, Carcano also represented Italy on 5 occasions between 1915 and 1921, scoring once.

== Managerial career ==
After he retired from playing, Carcano moved into management to much acclaim. He led Juventus to four consecutive league titles; the first of only two managers in Italy football history (alongside Massimiliano Allegri) to win four in a row. He later also managed the Italy national football team.

He was suddenly removed from the Juventus club in December 1934 in order to stifle a homosexual scandal in which he was involved by elements of society hostile to him. He remained on the edge of the football world for a decade.

== Personal life ==
Carcano died in Sanremo, aged 74, on 23 June 1965.

== Carlin's Boys ==
In 1947 in Sanremo Carlo Carcano was one of the co-founder of A.S.D. Carlin's Boys, a town football team famous above all for the youth sector that in the 2014–15 season playing in Promozione Liguria A and obtaining the promotion to Eccellenza Liguria is the main team of the city. In the same season the club won also Coppa Italia of Promozione Liguria and the title of Champion of Promozione Liguria.

The current president is Renato Bersano, while the coach is Valentino Papa.

The club organizes, every year in the last week of August, the Torneo Internazionale Sanremo reserved for the category Allievi, with the participation of the most prestigious and famous junior teams of world football.

== Honours ==
=== Manager ===
==== Club ====
Juventus

- Serie A: 1930–31, 1931–32, 1932–33, 1933–34

=== Individual ===
- Italian Football Hall of Fame: 2014
