= Ezio Sclavi =

Italian footballer (1903–1968)

Personal information
- Full name: Ezio Sclavi
- Date of birth: 23 March 1903
- Place of birth: Montù Beccaria, Italy
- Date of death: 31 August 1968 (aged 65)
- Place of death: Taggia, Italy
- Position: Goalkeeper

Senior career*
Years	Team	Apps	(Gls)
1922–1923	Stradellina	?	(0)
1923–1925	Lazio	32	(0)
1925–1926	Juventus	1	(0)
1926–1934	Lazio	220	(0)
1934–1935	Messina	18	(0)

International career
1931-1932	Italy	3	(0)

Managerial career
- 1935: Messina
- 1947: Viterbese
Medal record
Italy
Central European International Cup
Silver medal – second place	1931-32 Central European International Cup
- * Club domestic league appearances and goals

Ezio Sclavi (Italian pronunciation: [ˈɛttsjo ˈsklaːvi]; 23 March 1903 – 31 August 1968) was an Italian footballer who played as a goalkeeper. He represented the Italy national football team three times, the first being on 13 December 1931, coming on as a substitute for an injured Gianpiero Combi, subsequently starting the two next matches, while Combi was recovering, the first being the occasion of a 1931–32 Central European International Cup match against Switzerland in a 3–0 home win.

== Honours ==
=== Player ===
Juventus

- Prima Divisione: 1925–26

== International ==
Italy

- Central European International Cup: Runner-up: 1931-32
