= Oreste Barale =

Italian footballer (1904–1982)

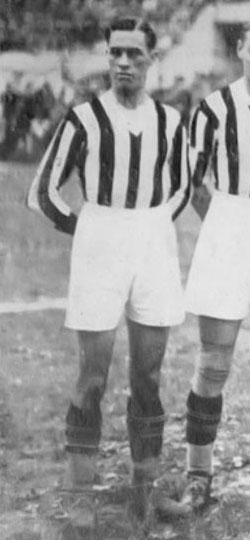
- Barale with Juventus in 1930

Personal information
- Date of birth: 4 October 1904
- Place of birth: Pezzana Vercellese, Italy
- Date of death: 1982 (aged 77–78)
- Position: Midfielder

Senior career*
Years	Team	Apps	(Gls)
1924–31	Juventus	113	(2)
1931–37	Alessandria	151	(2)
1937–40	Vigevano	32	(1)
1940–41	Cantù		

Managerial career
- 1942–1947: Lecco
- 1948–1949: Monza
- 1957–1958: Piacenza
- 1960–1961: Chiasso
- 1961–1962: Pro Sesto
- * Club domestic league appearances and goals

Oreste Barale (4 October 1904 – 1982) also known as Barale III was an Italian football player from Pezzana Vercellese in the Province of Vercelli. He played club football as a midfielder for Juventus winning two league titles; he also played with Alessandria.

== Honours ==
Juventus

- Serie A: 1925–26
- Serie A: 1930–31
