= Francesco Rier =

Italian footballer

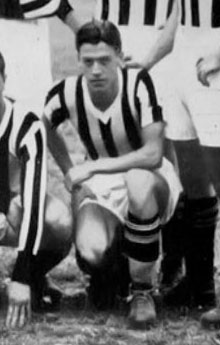
- Rier with Juventus in 1930

Personal information
- Date of birth: December 2, 1908
- Place of birth: Rovereto, Italy
- Date of death: 1991
- Position: Midfielder

Senior career*
Years	Team	Apps	(Gls)
1926–1927	Rovereto		
1928–1930	Lazio	29	(8)
1930–1931	Juventus	28	(2)
1931–1932	Servette		
1932–1934	Nice	13	(1)
1934–1936	Brescia	47	(10)
1936–1939	Palermo	39	(7)
1939–1940	Rovereto		
- * Club domestic league appearances and goals

Francesco Rier, also known as Franco Rier (born December 2, 1908, in Rovereto; died in 1991) was an Italian professional football player.

== Club career ==
Rier began his football career with the local club Rovereto before transferring to Modena in 1927, which was part of the Divisione Nazionale (the top tier of Italian football). Initially, the team was managed by Giuseppe Forlivesi for the first three matches, followed by Hungarian coach József Ging. The Canaries concluded the season in 5th place in Group B. Rier participated in 19 league matches, scoring 6 goals. In 1936, he relocated to Sicily to join Palermo in Serie B, where he played for three seasons. The Rosaneri achieved a consistent 7th place finish for three consecutive years.

== Honours ==
- Serie A champion: 1930/31.
