= Carlo Crotti =

Italian footballer (1900–1963)

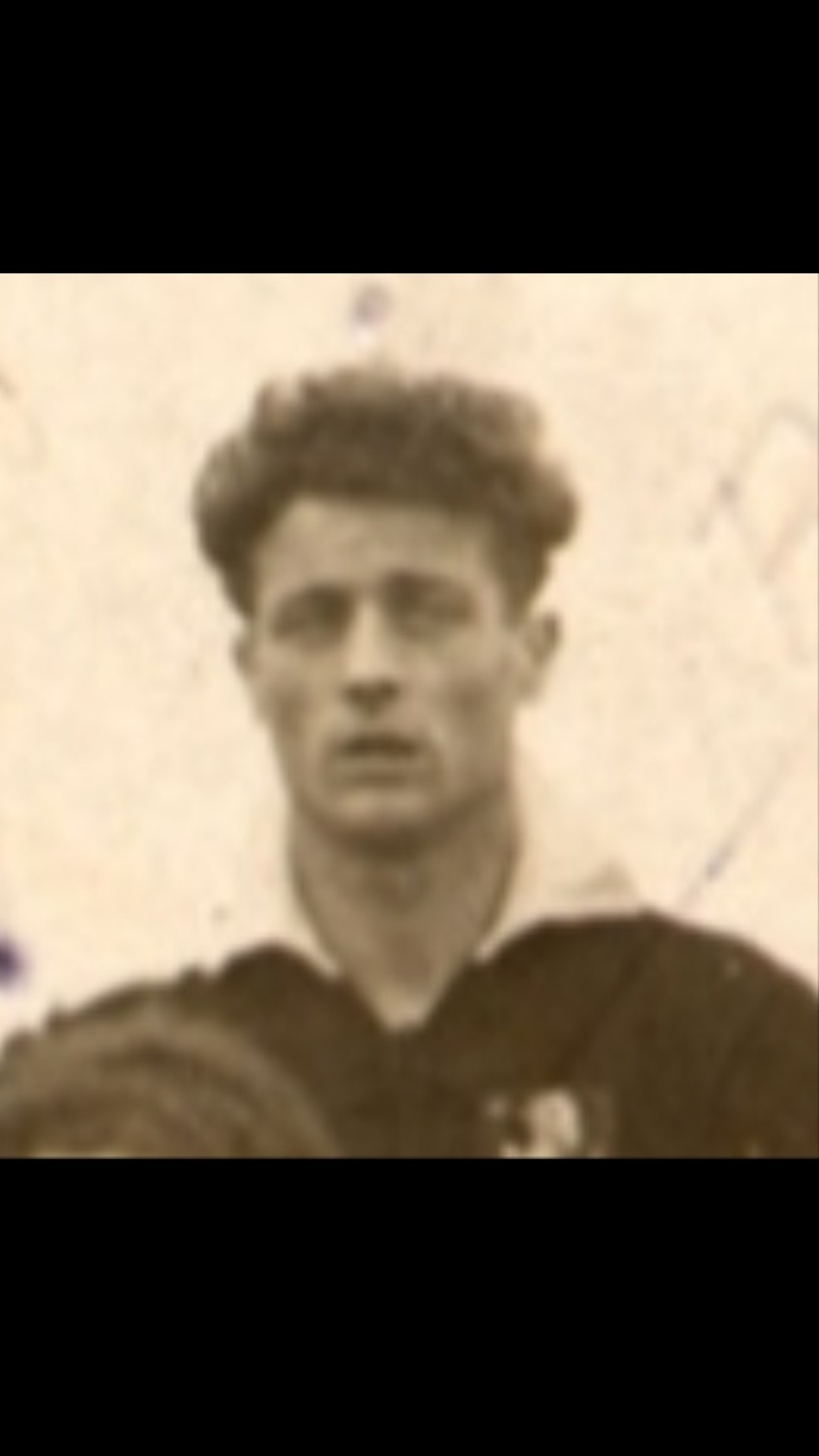

Personal information
- Date of birth: 9 September 1900
- Place of birth: Costa Vescovato, Kingdom of Italy
- Date of death: 1963 (age 62 or 63)
- Position: Striker

Senior career*
Years	Team	Apps	(Gls)
1919–1922	Novara		
1922–1925	Derthona		
1925–1928	Novara	?	(23)
1928–1931	Juventus	33	(3)
1931–1936	Derthona		
- * Club domestic league appearances and goals

Carlo Crotti (9 September 1900 – 1963) was an Italian professional football player.

His older brother Enrico Crotti also played football professionally. To distinguish them, Enrico was known as Crotti I and Carlo as Crotti II.

== Honours ==
- Serie A champion: 1930/31
