= Luigi Bertolini =

Italian footballer (1904–1977)

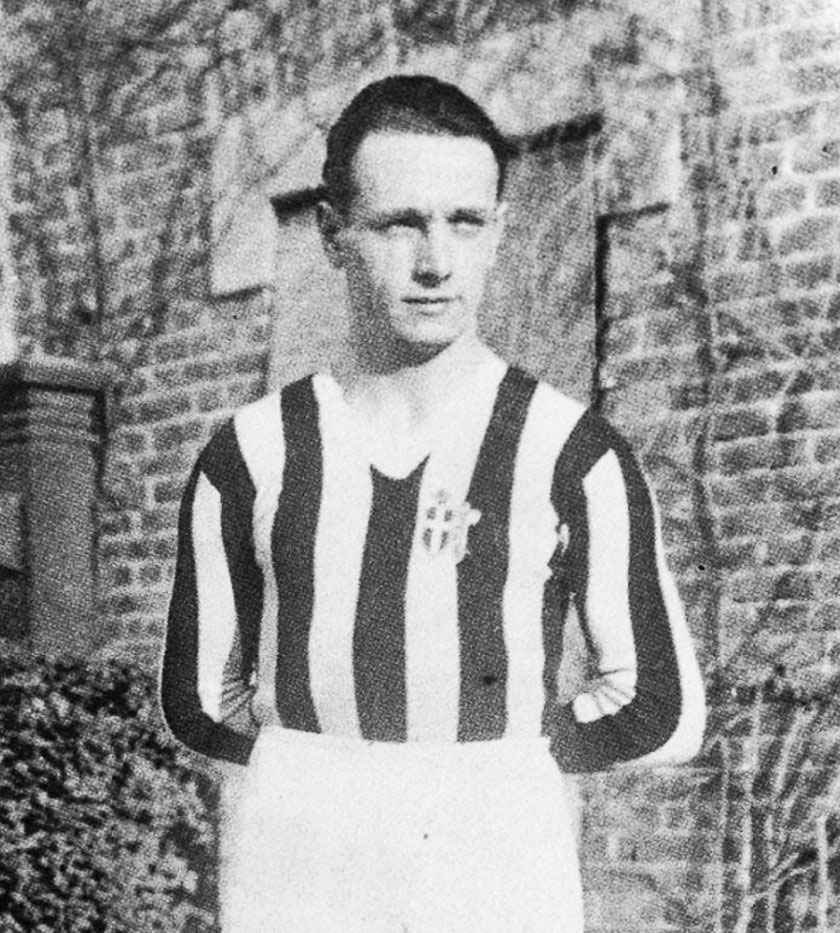
- Bertolini with Juventus in the 1930s

Personal information
- Full name: Luigi Bertolini
- Date of birth: 13 November 1904
- Place of birth: Busalla, Italy
- Date of death: 11 February 1977 (aged 72)
- Place of death: Turin, Italy
- Position: Midfielder

Senior career*
Years	Team	Apps	(Gls)
1924–1925	Borsalino	?	(?)
1925–1926	Savona	19	(9)
1926–1931	US Alessandria	119	(6)
1931–1937	Juventus	137	(5)
1937–1940	Tigullia	?	(?)

International career
1929–1935	Italy	26	(0)

Managerial career
- 1937–1940: Tigullia
- 1946–1947: Acireale
- 1947–1948: Reggina
- 1951: Juventus
- 1952: Brescia
- 1952–1953: Cuneo
- 1953–1955: Cenisia
- 1965–1966: Chieri
Medal record
Italy
Central European International Cup
Silver medal – second place	1931–32 Central European International Cup
FIFA World Cup
Gold medal – first place	1934 Italy
Central European International Cup
Gold medal – first place	1933–35 Central European International Cup
- * Club domestic league appearances and goals

Luigi Bertolini (Italian pronunciation: [luˈiːdʒi bertoˈliːni]; 13 September 1904 – 11 February 1977) was an Italian footballer who played as a midfielder.

== Club career ==
Born in Busalla, province of Genoa, Bertolini played in the 1920s for Savona, Alessandria and Juventus. He moved from Alessandria to Juventus in 1931, becoming an integral part of the remainder of their five-year championship run. In total, he played 137 matches for Juventus, scoring five goals, helping the team to win four Serie A tournaments. He retired from playing football in 1940.

== International career ==
With the Italy national football team, Bertolini made his debut in 1929, earning 26 caps in total, with his final international appearance coming in 1935. He was a member of the teams that finished as runners-up in the 1931–32 Central European International Cup, and which won the 1933–35 Central European International Cup. He was most notably also a member of the team that won the 1934 FIFA World Cup. Alongside Luisito Monti and Attilio Ferraris, Luigi Bertolini, he made up the legendary Italian midfield at the 1934 World Cup. In that tournament he started every game and was only rested by Pozzo in the first quarter-final encounter against Spain. Bertolini is very recognisable in the photos of the 1934 Italian World Cup-winning team by virtue of his big white bandana which he used to protect his head from the seams of the ball when attempting headers. He was also one of the so-called 'Lions of Highbury', the nicknamed bestowed upon the team that narrowly lost to England in November 1934, a match known as the Battle of Highbury. As the story goes, during the second half he was disoriented from fatigue and with the English constantly in attack, he kept calling out for Luisito not realising that Monti was not on the field (due to a broken bone) and the midline was just himself and Ferraris.

== Managerial career ==
Following his retirement, Bertolini began his coaching career with Tigullia in 1938.

== Honours ==
=== Club ===
Juventus

- Serie A: 1931–32, 1932–33, 1933–34, 1934–35

Tigullia

- Prima Divisione: 1937–38

=== International ===
Italy

- FIFA World Cup: 1934
- Central European International Cup: 1933–35; Runner-up: 1931–32
