= Oliviero Vojak =

Italian footballer

Personal information
- Date of birth: 24 March 1911
- Place of birth: Pula, Austrian Littoral, Austria-Hungary
- Date of death: 21 December 1932 (aged 21)
- Place of death: Turin, Italy
- Position: Striker

Senior career*
Years	Team	Apps	(Gls)
1927–1931	Juventus	9	(1)
1931–1932	Napoli	15	(5)
- * Club domestic league appearances and goals

Oliviero Vojak (24 March 1911 – 21 December 1932) was a professional football player in Italy who played as a striker.

== Career ==
Throughout his career, Vojak played for Italian clubs Juventus (1927–31) and Napoli (1931–32), winning the Serie A title with Juventus in 1931.

== Personal life ==
Oliviero's older brother Antonio Vojak was also a striker who played for Juventus and Napoli, and even played for the Italy national football team. To distinguish them, Antonio was known as Vojak I and Oliviero as Vojak II.

== Honours ==
Juventus

- Serie A champion: 1930–31

== See also ==
- Croats of Italy
