= Federico Munerati =

Italian footballer and manager

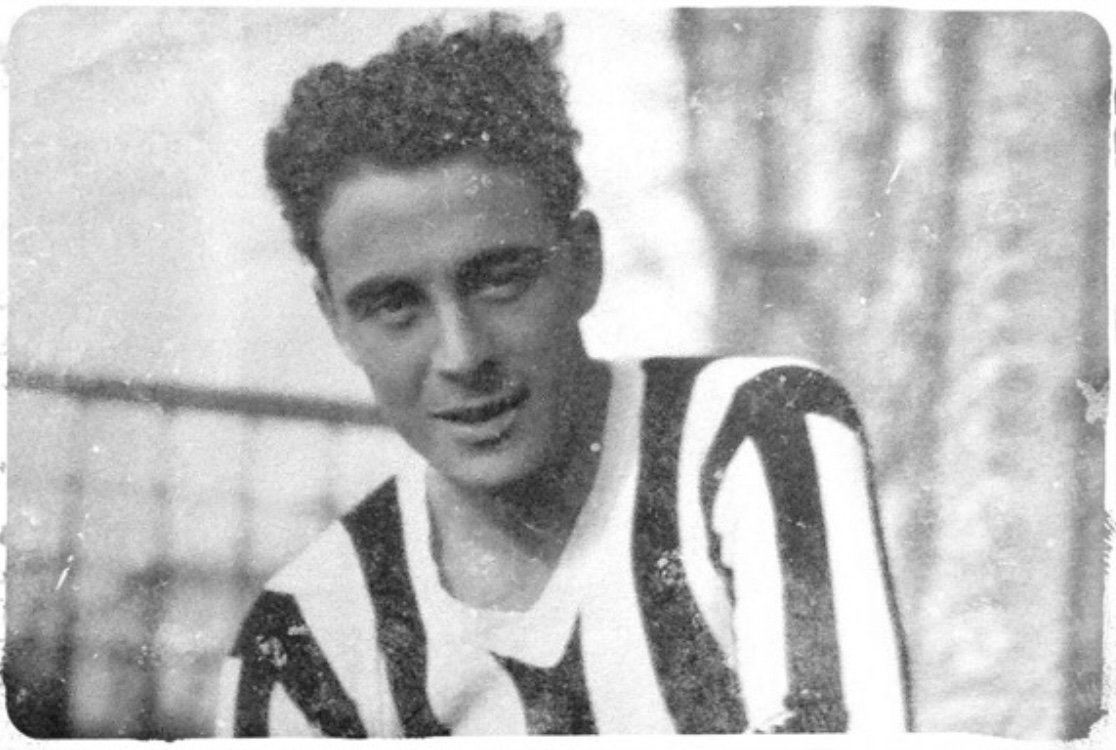
- Munerati with Juventus

Personal information
- Full name: Federico Munerati
- Date of birth: 20 September 1901
- Place of birth: La Spezia, Italy
- Date of death: 26 July 1980 (aged 78)
- Place of death: Chiavari, Italy
- Height: 1.78 m (5 ft 10 in)
- Positions: Forward; midfielder

Senior career*
Years	Team	Apps	(Gls)
1922–1933	Juventus	251	(111)
1933–1934	Sampierdarenese	31	(7)
1934–1935	A.C. Pistoiese	14	(2)

International career
1926-1927	Italy	4	(0)

Managerial career
- 1940–1942: Juventus
Medal record
Italy
Central European International Cup
Gold medal – first place	1927-30 Central European International Cup
- * Club domestic league appearances and goals

Federico Munerati (Italian pronunciation: [fedeˈriːko muneˈraːti]; 20 September 1901 – 26 July 1980) was an Italian footballer who played as a forward or as a midfielder.

== Club career ==
Born in La Spezia, Italy, Munerati played most of his career with Italian club Juventus (1922–33), where he won four Italian league titles during his nine seasons with the Turin side. He remains 10th on the all-time top goalscorers list for the Old Lady, as he scored 113 goals in 256 appearances in all competitions during his time spent playing with the club. He later spent single-season spells with Sampierdarenese (1933–1934) and A.C. Pistoiese (1934–1935), before retiring.

== International career ==
At international level, Munerati also played for the Italy national football team on four occasions in 1926 and 1927. He made his international debut on 18 July, under manager Augusto Rangone, in a 5–3 defeat to Sweden. He also made two appearances for the Italy B side, between 1926 and 1927. His biggest achievement was playing the first 2 matches of Italy´s successful 1927–30 Central European International Cup campaign.

== Managerial career ==
Munerati returned to Juventus after retirement from playing in the 1940s. He managed the club from 1940 until 1942.

== Style of play ==
A versatile player, Munerati usually played as an offensive-minded winger on the right, due to his pace, athleticism, technical ability, crossing accuracy, and ability to both score and create goals. Has also capable of playing as a striker or centre-forward, due to his eye for goal, opportunism in the penalty area, ability to make attacking runs, and his accuracy with his head. He was also deployed as an offensive minded central midfielder on occasion.

== Honours ==
=== Club ===
Juventus

- Serie A: 1925–26, 1930–31, 1931–32, 1932–33

Sampierdarenese

- Serie B: 1933–34

=== International ===
Italy

- Central European International Cup: 1927–30

=== Individual ===
- Juventus FC Hall of Fame: 2025
