= Giuseppe Torriani =

Italian footballer

Personal information
- Full name: Giuseppe Torriani
- Date of birth: 10 December 1904
- Place of birth: Milan, Italy
- Date of death: 21 January 1942 (aged 37)
- Place of death: Milan, Italy
- Position: Winger

Senior career*
Years	Team	Apps	(Gls)
1925–1926	Juventus	55	(5)
1927–1935	Milan	204	(33)
Total		259	(38)
- * Club domestic league appearances and goals

Giuseppe Torriani (10 December 1904 – 21 January 1942) was an Italian professional footballer who played as a forward.
