= Aldo Vollono =

Italian footballer (1906–1946)

Personal information
- Date of birth: 3 August 1906
- Place of birth: Genoa, Italy
- Date of death: 5 June 1946
- Position: Midfielder

Senior career*
Years	Team	Apps	(Gls)
1927–1930	Triestina		
1930–1931	Juventus	11	(0)
1931–1932	Triestina	11	(3)
1932–1933	Bari	2	(0)
1933–1934	FC Antibes	1	(0)
- * Club domestic league appearances and goals

Aldo Vollono (3 August 1906 – 5 June 1946) was an Italian professional footballer.

== Honours ==
- Serie A champion: 1930/31
