= Gilberto Pogliano =

Italian footballer

Personal information
- Date of birth: 2 February 1908
- Place of birth: Turin, Italy
- Date of death: 12 July 2002 (aged 94)
- Position: Midfielder

Senior career*
Years	Team	Apps	(Gls)
1929–1930	La Fedelissima Cuneese		
1930–1931	Juventus	1	(0)
1931–1933	Catania		
1933–1935	Parma	50	(26)
1935–1936	Cremonese	8	(1)
1936–1937	Parma	30	(1)
1937–1938	Varese	21	(0)
1938–1940	Acqui		
- * Club domestic league appearances and goals

Gilberto Pogliano (2 February 1908 – 12 July 2002) was an Italian professional football player.

== Honours ==
- Serie A champion: 1930/31
