= Lino Mosca =

Italian footballer

Personal information
- Full name: Lino Baldassarre Giovanni Battista Mosca Cirvella
- Date of birth: August 27, 1907
- Place of birth: Campiglia Cervo, Italy
- Date of death: February 15, 1992 (aged 84)
- Position: Midfielder

Senior career*
Years	Team	Apps	(Gls)
1924–1928	Biellese	64	(5)
1928–1931	Juventus	30	(0)
1931–1934	Cremonese	55	(0)
1934–1935	Cusiana Omegna		
- * Club domestic league appearances and goals

Lino Baldassarre Giovanni Battista Mosca Cirvella (August 27, 1907 in Campiglia Cervo – February 15, 1992) was an Italian professional football player.

== Honours ==
- Serie A champion: 1930/31
