= Mario Romani =

Italian footballer

Personal information
- Full name: Mario Romani
- Date of birth: 16 December 1907
- Place of birth: Ferrara, Italy
- Date of death: 25 May 1977 (aged 69)
- Place of death: Ferrara, Italy
- Height: 1.68 m (5 ft 6 in)
- Position: Striker

Senior career*
Years	Team	Apps	(Gls)
1925–1932	SPAL	169	(118)
1932–1936	Milan	80	(36)
1936–1937	Palermo	8	(0)
1937–1938	SPAL	20	(12)
Total		277	(166)
- * Club domestic league appearances and goals

Mario Romani (16 December 1907 – 25 May 1977) was an Italian professional footballer, who played as a striker.
