= Angelo Schiavio =

Italian footballer (1905–1990)

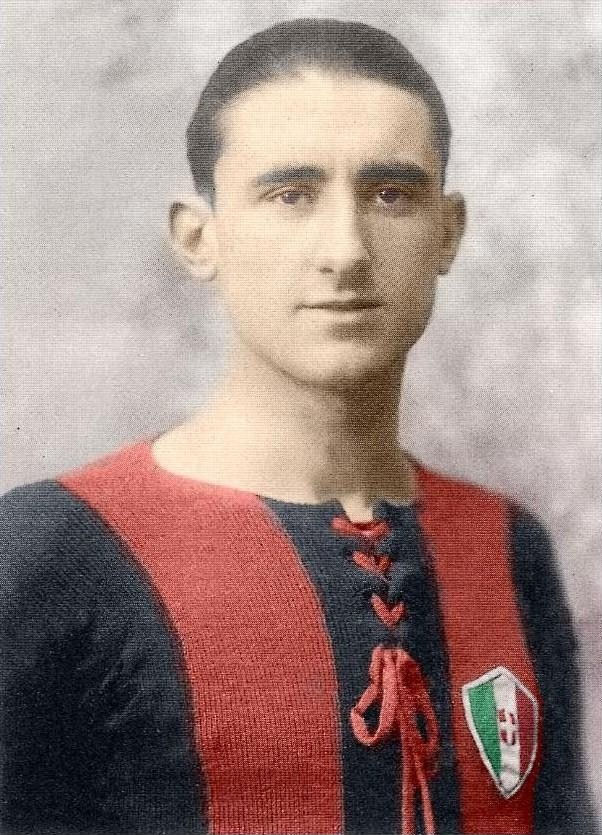
- Schiavio with Bologna in 1925

Personal information
- Date of birth: 15 October 1905
- Place of birth: Bologna, Italy
- Date of death: 17 September 1990 (aged 84)
- Place of death: Bologna, Italy
- Height: 1.78 m (5 ft 10 in)
- Position: Striker

Senior career*
Years	Team	Apps	(Gls)
1922–1939	Bologna	348	(242)
Total		348	(242)

International career
1925–1934	Italy	21	(15)

Managerial career
- 1933–1934: Bologna
- 1946: Bologna
- 1953–1958: Italy
Medal record
Men's Football
Representing Italy
FIFA World Cup
Winner	1934 Italy
Central European International Cup
Winner	1927–30 Europe
Winner	1933–35 Europe
Summer Olympics
Third place	1928 Amsterdam
- * Club domestic league appearances and goals

Angelo Schiavio (Italian pronunciation: [ˈandʒelo ˈskjaːvjo]; 15 October 1905 – 17 September 1990) was an Italian footballer who played as a forward. Schiavio spent his entire career with Bologna, the club of the city where he was born and died; he won four league titles with the club, and is the team's all-time highest goalscorer. He won the 1934 FIFA World Cup with Italy, finishing as the tournament's second-highest goalscorer; winning the 1927–30 Central European International Cup & 1933–35 Central European International Cup and he also won a bronze medal with Italy at the 1928 Summer Olympics. Following his retirement, he later also managed both Bologna and the Italy national side.

He is widely regarded as one of Italy's greatest strikers. In 2012, he was inducted into the Italian Football Hall of Fame.

Schiavo, who died on 17 September 1990, at the age of 84 in the Malpighi hospital of Bologna, was also the last surviving player from Italy's 1934 World Cup winning team.

== Club career ==
Schiavio spent his entire career with Bologna. He began his career with the first team during the 1922–23 Prima Divisione, playing 6 league games (11 in total) and scoring 6 goals; he made his debut for the club in 1923, at the age of 17. At that time, the Italian league was organised into several different regional groups. He continued to play (and score) regularly for Bologna, breaking into the starting line-up permanently at the age of 19, and in 1925 Bologna won the first league championship in their history, while Schiavio contributed to the victory with 15 goals in 27 games. The last season played in this "grouped" format was the 1928–29 season; that season, Bologna won their second championship, with Schiavio averaging a goal per game with 29 goals in 29 games – his most prolific domestic campaign.

The 1929–30 season saw the advent of the Serie A format. Schiavio played in his first Serie A game away against Lazio on 6 October 1929 – a 3–0 loss for Bologna. His first goal in Serie A came on 13 November later that year, in a 2–2 draw at home to Triestina. In the 1931–32 season he scored 25 goals, which led to him winning the Capocannonieri award for top scorer in Serie A. Bologna won two more Scudetti in 1936 and 1937, although Schiavio only played in two games in the latter victory. Schiavio's final season was in 1938–39, when he made 6 appearances in the league, but failed to score.

An important figure in the club's history, Schiavio spent 16 seasons with Bologna, winning four league titles. He made 362 appearances for the club in total, scoring 251 goals, and a club-record 242 goals in the Italian league, 109 of which were scored in the Italian Serie A format.

== International career ==
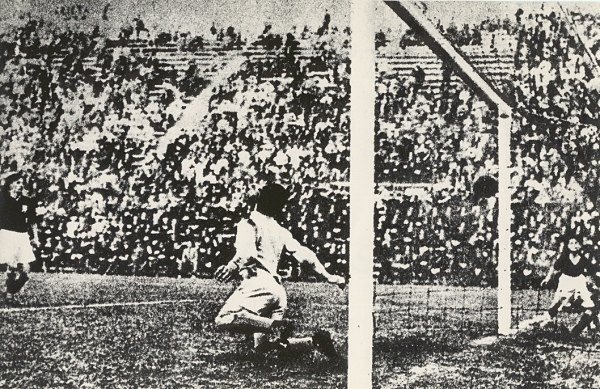
Schiavio scoring against Czechoslovakia in the 1934 World Cup Final.

Schiavio made his debut for the Italy national football team in November 1925, when he was 20 years old; he marked the occasion by scoring both goals in a 2–1 win over Yugoslavia in Padua. He participated in the 1928 Olympic Games, scoring 4 goals in 4 games as Italy won a bronze medal in the tournament. He then went on to win the 1927–30 Central European International Cup and 1933–35 Central European International Cup.

Schiavio was also instrumental in Italy's first World Cup win in 1934. Supported by players such as Luis Monti and Giuseppe Meazza, he scored a total of 4 goals, finishing the tournament as the second-highest scorer. FIFA originally credited Schiavio as one of three joint top scorers in the tournament (along with Czechoslovakia's Oldřich Nejedlý and Germany's Edmund Conen). However, FIFA revised this in November 2006, giving Nejedlý a fifth goal and the outright leading scorer title. Schiavio opened his account in the tournament with a hat-trick in the opening game against the USA on 27 May, which included Italy's first ever World Cup goal; the match eventually ended in a 7–1 win to the Italians. Despite his prolific display in Italy's opener, he was not able to score in any of the next two games Italy played in order to reach the final.

In the final, Czechoslovakia took the lead, but a late goal by Raimundo Orsi levelled the game. In the 5th minute of extra-time, despite carrying an injury, Schiavio converted a cross by Enrique Guaita – this goal ultimately proved decisive as the final score was 2–1; following the goal, he briefly fainted due to fatigue. This was Schiavio's final goal and game for Italy, as injury struggles kept him out of the team.

In total, Schiavio gained 21 caps for the national team, scoring 15 goals.

== Style of play ==
Schiavio was 178 cm tall and weighed 69 kg; he made his name as a quick and powerful centre-forward, with good technique and dribbling skills. He was also known for his pace, reactions, and offensive movement, which enabled him to lose his markers and make runs to beat the defensive line and get on the end of passes. A prolific goalscorer, he was an accurate and powerful finisher with both feet and he often used physical force to score goals. Moreover, he was a generous and versatile team-player, and was known for his willingness to play in several other offensive positions, including as a left winger, or even as an inside forward on occasion, which was known as the mezzala role at the time in Italian football jargon. Despite his ability, however, he also struggled with injuries throughout his career.

== Career statistics ==
=== Club ===
Appearances and goals by club, season and competition
Club	Season	League			Coppa Italia		League cup		Europe		Total	
Club	Season	Division	Apps	Goals	Apps	Goals	Apps	Goals	Apps	Goals	Apps	Goals
Bologna	1922–23	Prima Divisione	11	6								
Bologna	1923–24	Prima Divisione	24	16								
Bologna	1924–25	Prima Divisione	27	15								
Bologna	1925–26	Prima Divisione	23	26								
Bologna	1926–27	Divizione Nazionale	25	15								
Bologna	1927–28	Divizione Nazionale	30	26								
Bologna	1928–29	Divizione Nazionale	29	29								
Bologna	1929–30	Serie A	15	7								
Bologna	1930–31	Serie A	21	16								
Bologna	1931–32	Serie A	30	25								
Bologna	1932–33	Serie A	33	28								
Bologna	1933–34	Serie A	19	9								
Bologna	1934–35	Serie A	27	12								
Bologna	1935–36	Serie A	26	10								
Bologna	1936–37	Serie A	2	2								
Bologna	1937–38	Serie A	6	0								
Career total			348	242							364	251

=== International ===
Appearances and goals by national team and year
National team	Year	Apps	Goals
Italy	1925	1	2
Italy	1926	2	1
Italy	1927	1	0
Italy	1928	5	4
Italy	1929	3	0
Italy	1930	0	0
Italy	1931	0	0
Italy	1932	1	0
Italy	1933	4	4
Italy	1934	4	4
Total		21	15

== Honours ==
Bologna

- Serie A: 1924–25, 1928–29, 1935–36, 1936–37
- Mitropa Cup: 1932, 1934
- International Trophy of the Universal Expo of Paris: 1937

Italy

- FIFA World Cup: 1934
- Central European International Cup: 1927–30, 1933–35
- Summer Olympics Bronze Medal: 1928

Individual

- Serie A Capocannoniere: 1931–32 (25 goals)
- FIFA World Cup Silver Boot: 1934
- Italian Football Hall of Fame: 2012 (posthumous)

World Cup-winners status
Preceded by Luis Monti	Oldest living player 9 September 1983 – 17 September 1990	Succeeded by Guido Masetti
