= Francesco Imberti (footballer) =

Italian footballer (1912–2008)

Personal information
- Date of birth: 17 March 1912
- Place of birth: Barge, Italy
- Date of death: 3 October 2008 (aged 96)
- Place of death: Cavour, Italy
- Position: Striker

Senior career*
Years	Team	Apps	(Gls)
1929–1932	Torino	24	(8)
1932–1933	Juventus	2	(0)
1933–1934	Pescara		
1934–1935	Lucchese	21	(6)
1935–1936	Biellese	19	(9)
1936–1940	Sanremese		
1940–1941	Savona	6	(4)
- * Club domestic league appearances and goals

Francesco Imberti (born 17 March 1912 in Barge; died 3 October 2008 in Cavour) was an Italian professional football player.

== Honours ==
- Serie A champion: 1932/33.
