= Cesare Augusto Fasanelli =

Italian footballer (1907-1992)

Personal information
- Date of birth: 19 May 1907
- Place of birth: Rome, Italy
- Date of death: 4 April 1992 (aged 84)
- Height: 1.74 m (5 ft 8 1/2 in)
- Position: Midfielder

Senior career*
Years	Team	Apps	(Gls)
1925–1927	Alba Roma	12	(2)
1927–1933	Roma	165	(55)
1933–1935	Pisa	63	(7)
1935–1936	Fiorentina	5	(0)
1936–1938	Genova 1893	32	(10)
1938–1939	Parma	13	(4)
1939–1941	M.A.T.E.R.		
1941–1943	Ala Littoria		
1943–1944	M.A.T.E.R.	7	(1)
- * Club domestic league appearances and goals

Cesare Augusto Fasanelli (19 May 1907 – 4 April 1992) was an Italian professional footballer who played as a midfielder.

== Career ==
Fasanelli played for 7 seasons (157 games, 48 goals) in the Serie A for A.S. Roma, ACF Fiorentina and Genova 1893.

== Honours ==
=== Club ===
Genoa

- Coppa Italia winner: 1936–37.

=== Individual ===
- Among the Top 10 goalscorers of Serie A in the 1930–31 season (17 goals).
