= 1931–32 Serie A =

31st season of top-tier Italian football

Serie A
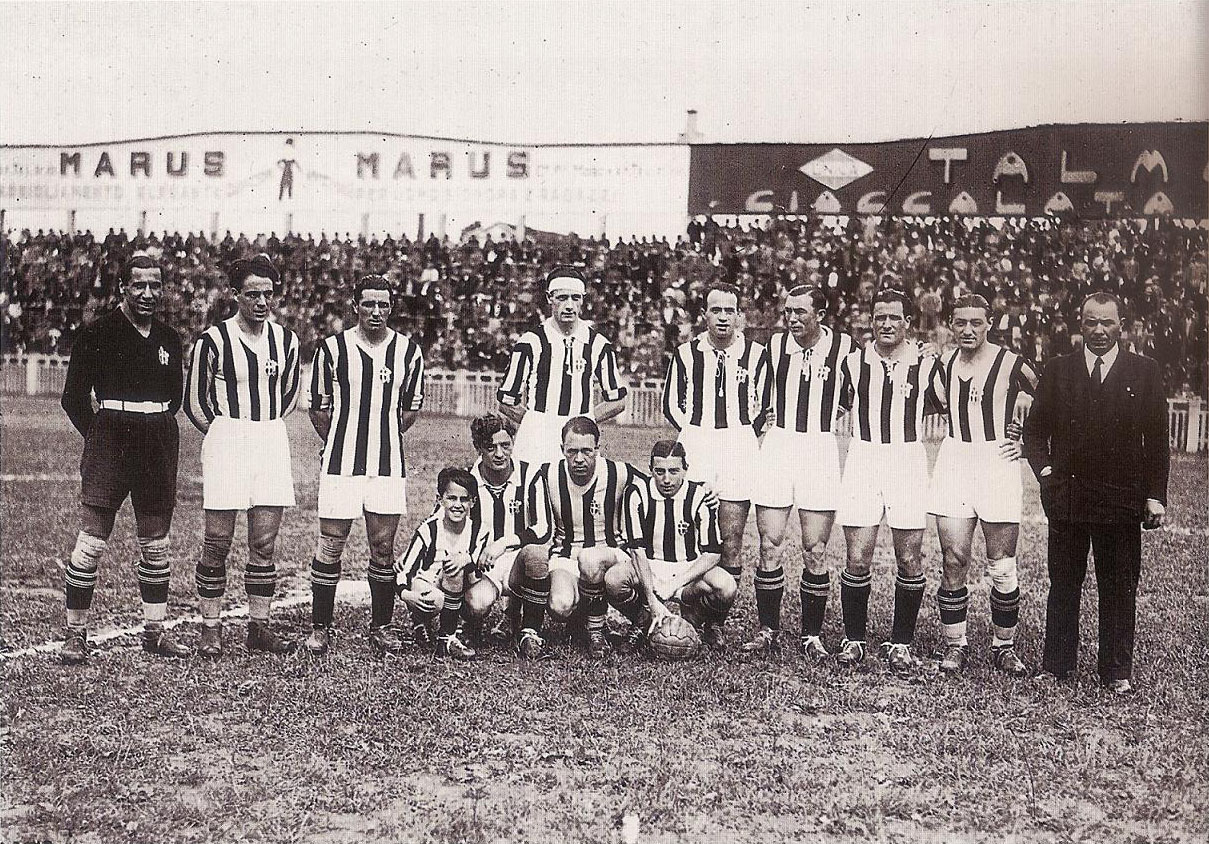
- The 1931–32 Serie A winning Juventus squad
- Season: 1931–32
- Champions: Juventus; 4th title
- Relegated: Brescia; Modena
- Matches: 307
- Goals: 952 (3.1 per match)
- Top goalscorer: Pedro Petrone; Angelo Schiavio (25 goals)

The 1931-32 Serie A was the thirty-second edition of the Italian Football Championship and the third since 1929 re-branding to create Serie A. It was the ninth season from which the Italian Football Champions adorned their team jerseys in the subsequent season with a Scudetto. Juventus were champions for the second of five successive seasons and for the fourth time in their history. This was their third scudetto since the scudetto started being awarded in 1924 and their second win contested as Serie A.

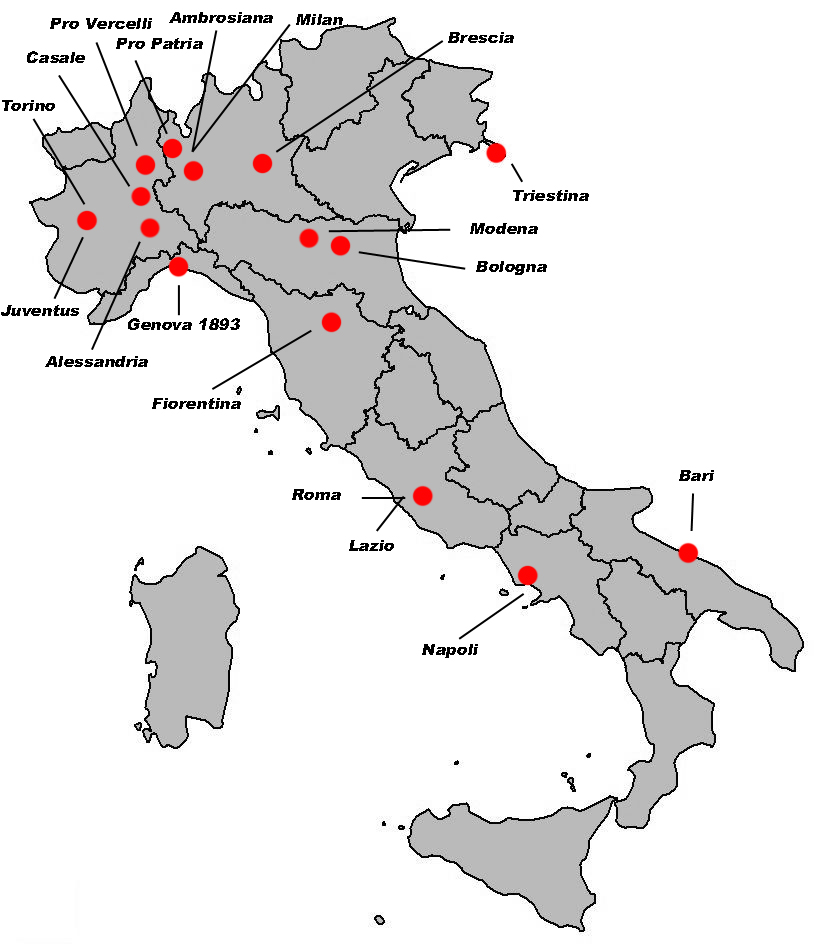
Serie A 1930-31 teams distribution

== Teams ==
Fiorentina and Bari had been promoted from Serie B.

== Final classification ==
Pos	Team	Pld	W	D	L	GF	GA	GD	Pts	Qualification or relegation
1	Juventus (C)	34	24	6	4	89	38	+51	54	1932 Mitropa Cup
2	Bologna	34	21	8	5	85	33	+52	50	1932 Mitropa Cup
3	Roma	34	16	8	10	53	42	+11	40	
4	Fiorentina	34	16	7	11	54	35	+19	39	
4	Milan	34	15	9	10	57	40	+17	39	
6	Ambrosiana-Inter	34	15	8	11	67	52	+15	38	
6	Alessandria	34	15	8	11	66	53	+13	38	
8	Torino	34	14	9	11	64	53	+11	37	
9	Napoli	34	13	9	12	48	46	+2	35	
10	Pro Patria	34	9	13	12	37	55	−18	31	
11	Genova 1893	34	11	8	15	48	56	−8	30	
12	Casale	34	12	4	18	51	67	−16	28	
13	Lazio	34	10	7	17	45	53	−8	27	
13	Triestina	34	8	11	15	42	61	−19	27	
13	Pro Vercelli	34	10	7	17	35	54	−19	27	
16	Bari	34	9	7	18	36	64	−28	25	Relegation tie-breaker
17	Brescia (R)	34	8	9	17	31	60	−29	25	Serie B after tie-breaker
18	Modena (R)	34	7	8	19	41	87	−46	22	Relegation to Serie B

Source: Panini
(C) Champions; (R) Relegated

== Relegation tie-breaker ==
Played in Bologna.

Team 1	Score	Team 2
Bari	2-1	Brescia

Brescia was relegated to Serie B.

== Results ==
Home \ Away	ALE	AMB	BAR	BOL	BRE	CSL	FIO	GEN	JUV	LAZ	MIL	MOD	NAP	PPA	PVE	ROM	TOR	TRI
Alessandria		2–1	3–0	3–3	3–2	1–4	1–0	2–2	2–3	2–1	2–1	5–0	3–1	6–1	4–5	0–1	1–1	4–0
Ambrosiana-Inter	4–0		0–0	4–3	5–0	4–0	1–1	3–1	2–4	2–0	0–0	4–2	6–1	3–1	4–1	2–1	1–1	4–3
Bari	1–0	0–0		1–2	1–1	0–1	3–0	4–2	0–1	1–0	2–5	1–0	0–2	2–1	1–0	1–2	3–2	3–2
Bologna	3–1	2–0	2–0		6–1	4–2	2–1	2–0	1–1	5–1	3–0	4–0	2–0	4–0	1–0	3–0	4–2	8–0
Brescia	1–0	0–2	0–0	0–1		1–0	0–1	4–2	0–4	1–0	2–3	2–1	1–0	0–0	2–0	1–1	1–2	2–1
Casale	2–2	3–1	6–2	1–5	2–1		3–2	2–0	1–1	0–1	0–1	4–0	1–0	1–2	0–1	1–0	1–1	0–1
Fiorentina	0–1	3–0	2–1	1–3	2–1	4–1		2–2	1–2	2–0	3–0	5–0	2–0	1–0	1–0	3–1	4–2	1–0
Genova 1893	1–2	0–1	3–0	3–2	4–0	3–1	1–1		2–0	1–0	1–2	3–0	1–0	4–1	2–1	1–1	2–2	2–0
Juventus	3–0	6–2	7–3	3–2	3–0	3–2	2–2	2–1		1–2	2–0	3–0	5–3	7–2	4–1	7–1	3–0	4–2
Lazio	2–2	2–2	3–2	2–1	2–0	1–3	1–0	0–0	0–3		0–0	9–1	0–2	1–2	5–0	1–4	2–0	2–0
Milan	1–1	2–3	2–1	1–0	2–2	4–2	1–1	3–0	0–0	2–0		5–0	3–1	1–1	3–0	1–2	6–1	1–1
Modena	2–1	3–1	0–0	0–0	2–2	4–1	1–1	0–0	0–1	3–1	2–1		2–2	1–1	2–0	2–3	5–2	1–1
Napoli	1–1	1–0	3–0	1–1	1–1	5–1	0–2	3–1	2–0	0–0	3–1	4–1		1–1	2–1	1–0	0–0	4–2
Pro Patria	2–1	1–1	2–2	0–2	0–0	3–1	0–3	2–0	1–1	1–1	2–0	3–1	0–0		2–1	2–2	2–1	0–2
Pro Vercelli	1–1	2–0	2–0	1–1	1–0	0–1	1–0	4–2	1–2	2–2	0–2	2–1	1–1	1–0		0–0	2–0	1–1
Roma	1–2	2–1	0–0	1–1	3–1	4–0	1–1	6–0	2–0	2–0	1–0	4–2	1–0	0–0	2–1		2–3	1–0
Torino	1–3	2–1	6–1	1–1	4–0	3–1	1–0	3–1	0–0	3–1	0–0	6–0	4–1	3–1	4–0	2–1		1–1
Triestina	1–4	2–2	2–0	1–1	1–1	2–2	2–1	0–0	0–1	3–2	1–3	5–2	1–2	0–0	1–1	2–0	1–0	

Source: Almanacco Illustrato del Calcio - La Storia 1898-2004, Panini Edizioni, Modena, September 2005 (in Italian)
Legend: Blue = home team win; Yellow = draw; Red = away team win.

== Top goalscorers ==
Rank	Player	Club	Goals
1	(Uruguay) Pedro Petrone	Fiorentina	25
1	(Italy) Angelo Schiavio	Bologna	25
3	(Italy) Libero Marchini	Alessandria	21
3	(Italy) Giuseppe Meazza	Ambrosiana-Inter	21
5	(Italy) Bruno Maini	Bologna	19
5	(Argentina) (Italy) Raimundo Orsi	Juventus	19
7	(Italy) Giovanni Ferrari	Juventus	17
7	(Italy) Aldo Borel	Casale	17
7	(Italy) Gino Rossetti	Torino	17
7	(Italy) Rodolfo Volk	Roma	17
11	(Argentina) (Italy) Julio Libonatti	Torino	16
12	(Italy) Giovanni Vecchina	Juventus	15
13	(Italy) Federico Munerati	Juventus	14
14	(Italy) Antonio Bisigato	Bari	13
14	(Italy) Pietro Pastore	Milan	13

== References and sources ==
- Almanacco Illustrato del Calcio - La Storia 1898-2004, Panini Edizioni, Modena, September 2005
