= Giovanni Vecchina =

Italian footballer and manager

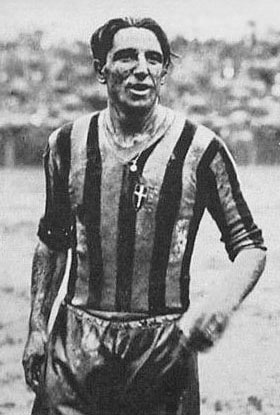
- Vecchina with Juventus in 1932

Personal information
- Date of birth: 16 August 1902
- Place of birth: Venice, Kingdom of Italy
- Date of death: 5 April 1973 (aged 70)
- Place of death: Vicenza, Italy
- Position: Forward

Senior career*
| Years | Team | Apps | (Gls) |
| 1919–1922 | Venezia | | |
| 1922–1924 | Petrarca Padova | | |
| 1924–1930 | Padova | 115 | (84) |
| 1930–1933 | Juventus | 68 | (33) |
| 1933–1935 | Torino | 32 | (3) |
| 1935–1936 | Biellese | | |
| 1939–1940 | Siracusa | | |

International career
| 1928 | Italy | 2 | (0) |

Managerial career
- 1947–1948: Napoli
- * Club domestic league appearances and goals

Giovanni Vecchina (Italian pronunciation: [dʒoˈvanni vekˈkiːna]; 16 August 1902 – 5 April 1973) was an Italian football player and manager from Venice in the region of Veneto. A forward, Vecchina played his entire career in the Italian football system; he is best known for his time with Juventus, Venezia and Padova. At international level, he represented the Italy national football team twice in 1928.

After retiring from playing, Vecchia went on to manage Italian football clubs including Napoli with Attila Sallustro.
