= Antonio Vojak =

Italian footballer (1904-1975)

- Vojak with Juventus in 1927

Personal information
- Full name: Antonio Vojak
- Date of birth: 19 November 1904
- Place of birth: Pola, Austrian Littoral, Austria-Hungary
- Date of death: 9 May 1975 (aged 70)
- Place of death: Varese, Italy
- Height: 1.75 m (5 ft 9 in)
- Positions: Striker; midfielder

Senior career*
Years	Team	Apps	(Gls)
1924–1925	Lazio	10	(7)
1925–1929	Juventus	102	(46)
1929–1935	Napoli	190	(102)
1935–1936	Genoa	17	(4)
1936–1937	Lucchese-Libertas	1	(0)

International career
1932	Italy	1	(0)

Managerial career
- 1937–1939: I. G. Empoli
- 1940–1943: Napoli
- 1947: Avellino
- 1955–1956: Carrarese
Medal record
Italy
Central European International Cup
Silver medal – second place	1931–32 Central European International Cup
- * Club domestic league appearances and goals

Antonio Vojak (Italian pronunciation: [anˈtɔːnjo ˈvɔːjak], Croatian: [ʋôjaːk]; 19 November 1904 – 9 May 1975) was an Italian footballer who played as a striker or midfielder. His playing career was played out during the 1920s and 1930s.

He is most noted for his time with Italian sides Juventus and Napoli, for the latter of which he scored 102 goals.

His younger brother Oliviero Vojak played professionally as well, for Juventus and Napoli. To distinguish them, Antonio was known as Vojak I and Oliviero as Vojak II.

== Career ==
Vojak with Napoli

Vojak was born in Pula, now in Croatia but then part of Austria-Hungary, and later ceded to the Kingdom of Italy in 1918.

Vojak's football career started with Lazio during the 1924–25 season, his stay there was very short; playing only 10 games but scoring 7 goals. This caught the attention of Juventus, who signed up Vojak within that year.

During his three-year stay with the Turinese team, Vojak was part of a squad which won the Italian Football Championship in 1926, amassing 46 goals in 102 games for the club in total.

He moved on next to Napoli, playing in a squad that featured Attila Sallustro. He stayed with the club until 1935, scoring over 100 goals for them. Vojak also appeared for the Italy national football team once in 1932 where he played midfield in the silver medal winning 1931–32 Central European International Cup campaign. Due to fascist anti-slav laws, he was forced to use the name Vogliani.

After leaving Napoli, Vojak played only two more seasons; first with Genoa and then with Lucchese-Libertas in 1936–37 where he played only 1 game. After retiring, he served as a manager. He died in 1975.

== Honours ==
=== Club ===
Juventus

- Italian Football Championship: 1925–26

=== International ===
Italy

- Central European International Cup: Runner-up: 1931–32

== See also ==
- Croats of Italy
