= 1932–33 Serie A =

32nd season of top-tier Italian football

Serie A
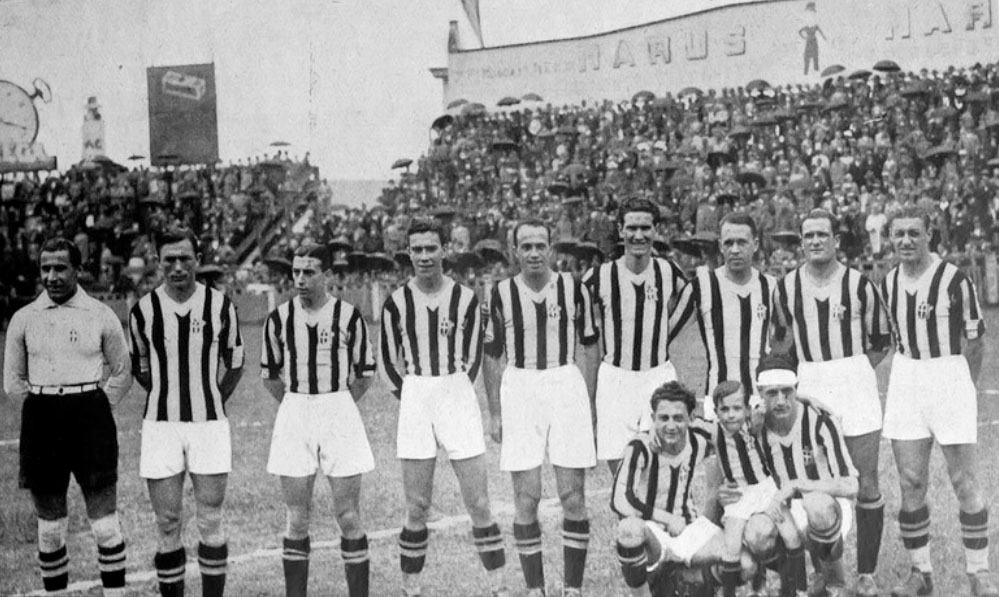
- The 1932–33 Serie A winning Juventus squad
- Season: 1932–33
- Champions: Juventus; 5th title
- Relegated: Bari; Pro Patria
- Matches: 306
- Goals: 941 (3.08 per match)
- Top goalscorer: Felice Borel (29 goals)

The 1932-33 Serie A was the thirty-third edition of the Italian Football Championship and its fourth season since 1929 re-branding to create Serie A. It was the tenth season from which the Italian Football Champions adorned their team jerseys in the subsequent season with a Scudetto. Juventus were champions for the third of five successive season and for the fifth time in their history. This was their fourth scudetto since the scudetto started being awarded in 1924 and their third win contested as Serie A.

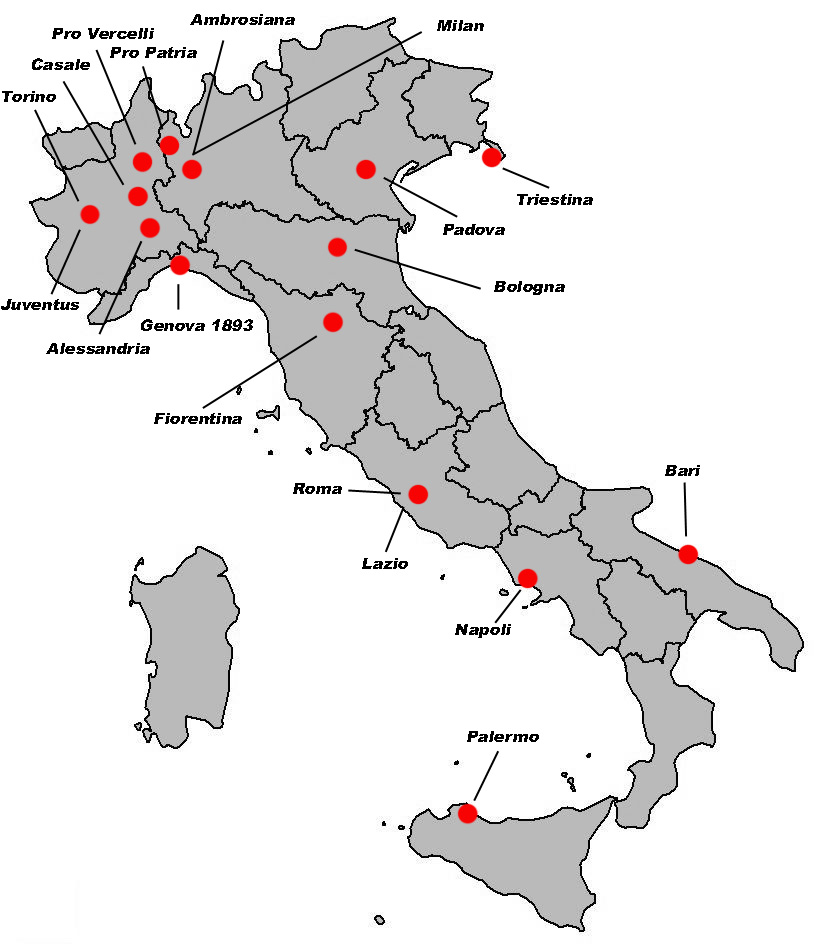
Serie A 1932-33 teams distribution

== Teams ==
Palermo and Padova had been promoted from Serie B.

== Final classification ==
Pos	Team	Pld	W	D	L	GF	GA	GD	Pts	Qualification or relegation
1	Juventus (C)	34	25	4	5	83	23	+60	54	1933 Mitropa Cup
2	Ambrosiana-Inter	34	19	8	7	80	53	+27	46	1933 Mitropa Cup
3	Bologna	34	15	12	7	69	33	+36	42	
3	Napoli	34	18	6	10	64	38	+26	42	
5	Roma	34	14	11	9	58	35	+23	39	
5	Fiorentina	34	16	7	11	48	38	+10	39	
7	Torino	34	14	8	12	65	54	+11	36	
8	Genova 1893	34	13	8	13	58	60	−2	34	
8	Triestina	34	14	6	14	41	56	−15	34	
10	Lazio	34	12	9	13	42	44	−2	33	
11	Milan	34	11	10	13	57	62	−5	32	
12	Pro Vercelli	34	13	3	18	42	58	−16	29	
12	Palermo	34	11	7	16	28	58	−30	29	
14	Padova	34	8	12	14	43	55	−12	28	
14	Alessandria	34	10	8	16	42	60	−18	28	
16	Casale	34	9	6	19	35	75	−40	24	
17	Bari (R)	34	8	6	20	40	68	−28	22	Relegation to Serie B
18	Pro Patria (R)	34	8	5	21	46	71	−25	21	Relegation to Serie B

Source: Panini
(C) Champions; (R) Relegated

== Results ==
Home \ Away	ALE	AMB	BAR	BOL	CSL	FIO	GEN	JUV	LAZ	MIL	NAP	PAD	PAL	PPA	PVE	ROM	TOR	TRI
Alessandria		2–3	1–0	2–0	1–1	0–3	3–1	3–2	0–1	0–2	3–2	4–1	0–0	1–0	0–0	2–2	1–1	4–1
Ambrosiana-Inter	1–0		5–1	1–1	4–2	3–1	0–2	2–2	1–2	5–4	3–5	3–2	5–1	6–2	3–0	3–2	5–1	2–1
Bari	1–2	2–3		1–1	3–3	1–0	4–2	0–4	2–3	2–2	2–4	1–0	1–1	2–0	2–0	0–2	3–1	2–1
Bologna	4–0	2–1	3–0		7–0	1–1	0–0	1–2	4–1	2–2	3–1	1–0	3–0	6–1	2–0	2–2	1–1	5–0
Casale	0–0	2–2	5–1	3–4		1–0	2–3	1–2	1–0	0–0	1–0	1–0	2–1	3–2	0–1	1–1	1–0	2–0
Fiorentina	3–1	0–0	1–0	1–0	3–0		2–0	1–0	3–1	5–1	1–0	2–2	1–0	1–0	2–0	0–0	0–1	0–1
Genova 1893	2–3	2–2	3–1	1–0	2–0	2–4		3–2	2–1	2–2	2–2	1–1	7–2	1–1	0–2	2–1	2–0	4–0
Juventus	3–0	3–0	2–0	2–2	6–0	5–0	4–1		4–0	3–0	3–0	3–1	5–0	2–0	4–2	1–0	2–1	6–1
Lazio	6–0	0–0	0–0	0–2	1–0	0–0	0–0	1–0		2–0	0–1	4–0	1–1	2–1	2–1	2–1	0–0	1–2
Milan	3–3	1–3	2–0	0–3	3–0	2–2	4–2	1–1	0–0		0–3	6–2	2–1	5–0	2–1	2–1	4–3	2–2
Napoli	4–1	3–0	2–0	2–1	4–0	2–1	3–0	1–0	3–1	0–1		1–1	5–0	2–1	3–0	1–2	1–1	2–0
Padova	2–1	1–1	1–2	0–0	2–1	1–1	3–0	1–1	1–1	2–1	2–2		3–0	4–1	2–1	1–1	3–1	0–1
Palermo	1–1	0–2	1–0	0–0	1–0	1–3	1–1	0–2	2–1	1–0	1–0	3–0		2–1	1–1	0–2	1–0	1–0
Pro Patria	2–1	0–0	2–1	3–3	5–1	1–2	3–4	0–2	2–3	3–1	2–0	1–0	2–3		1–0	1–3	1–1	1–2
Pro Vercelli	3–2	2–4	4–2	1–3	2–1	1–0	1–0	0–2	1–1	2–1	2–1	3–1	2–0	0–2		3–1	2–3	3–2
Roma	1–0	0–1	1–0	0–0	2–0	4–2	1–3	0–1	3–1	4–0	1–1	1–1	3–0	1–1	2–0		7–1	4–0
Torino	3–0	3–2	6–3	3–2	9–0	3–2	3–0	0–1	4–2	0–0	0–1	4–2	0–1	3–1	4–0	1–1		1–0
Triestina	1–0	1–4	0–0	1–0	3–0	3–0	2–1	0–1	2–1	2–1	2–2	0–0	2–0	3–2	2–1	1–1	2–2	

Source: Almanacco Illustrato del Calcio - La Storia 1898-2004, Panini Edizioni, Modena, September 2005 (in Italian)
Legend: Blue = home team win; Yellow = draw; Red = away team win.

== Top goalscorers ==
Rank	Player	Club	Goals
1	(Italy) Felice Borel	Juventus	29
2	(Italy) Angelo Schiavio	Bologna	28
3	(Italy) Antonio Vojak	Napoli	22
4	(Italy) Giuseppe Meazza	Ambrosiana-Inter	20
5	(Italy) Virgilio Levratto	Ambrosiana-Inter	19
5	(Italy) Mario Romani	Milan	19
5	(Paraguay) (Italy) Attila Sallustro	Napoli	19
8	(Italy) Giovanni Busoni	Torino	17
9	(Italy) Gino Rossetti	Torino	15
9	(Italy) Raffaele Costantino	Roma	15
9	(Argentina) Juan Manuel Sposito	Sampierdarenese	15
12	(Argentina) (Italy) Attilio Demaría	Ambrosiana-Inter	13
13	(Italy) Rodolfo Volk	Roma	12
13	(Uruguay) Pedro Petrone	Fiorentina	12
15	(Italy) Giovanni Ferrari	Juventus	11
15	(Italy) Silvio Piola	Pro Vercelli	11
15	(Italy) Carlo Reguzzoni	Bologna	11
15	(Italy) Mario Celoria	Casale	11

== References and sources ==
- Almanacco Illustrato del Calcio - La Storia 1898-2004, Panini Edizioni, Modena, September 2005
