= 1930–31 Serie A =

30th season of top-tier Italian football

Serie A
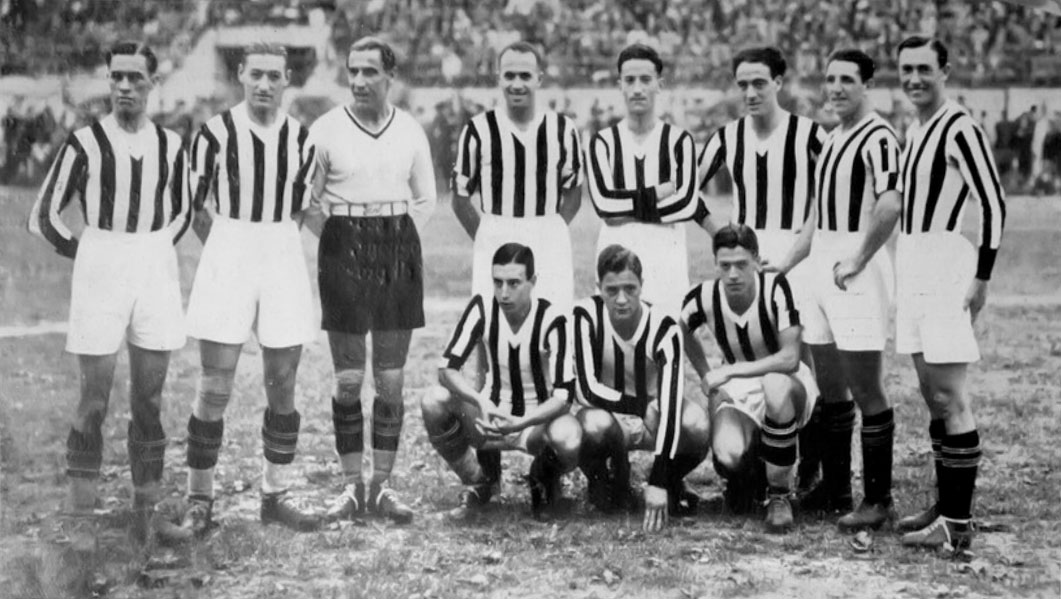
- The 1930–31 Serie A winning Juventus squad
- Season: 1930–31
- Champions: Juventus; 3rd title
- Relegated: Livorno; Legnano
- Matches: 306
- Goals: 952 (3.11 per match)
- Top goalscorer: Rodolfo Volk (28 goals)

The 1930-31 Serie A was the thirty-first edition of the Italian Football Championship and the second since 1929 re-branding to create Serie A. It was the eighth season from which the Italian Football Champions adorned their team jerseys in the subsequent season with a Scudetto. Juventus won for the first of five successive wins, and for the third time in their history. This was their second scudetto since the scudetto started being awarded in 1924 and their first win contested as Serie A.

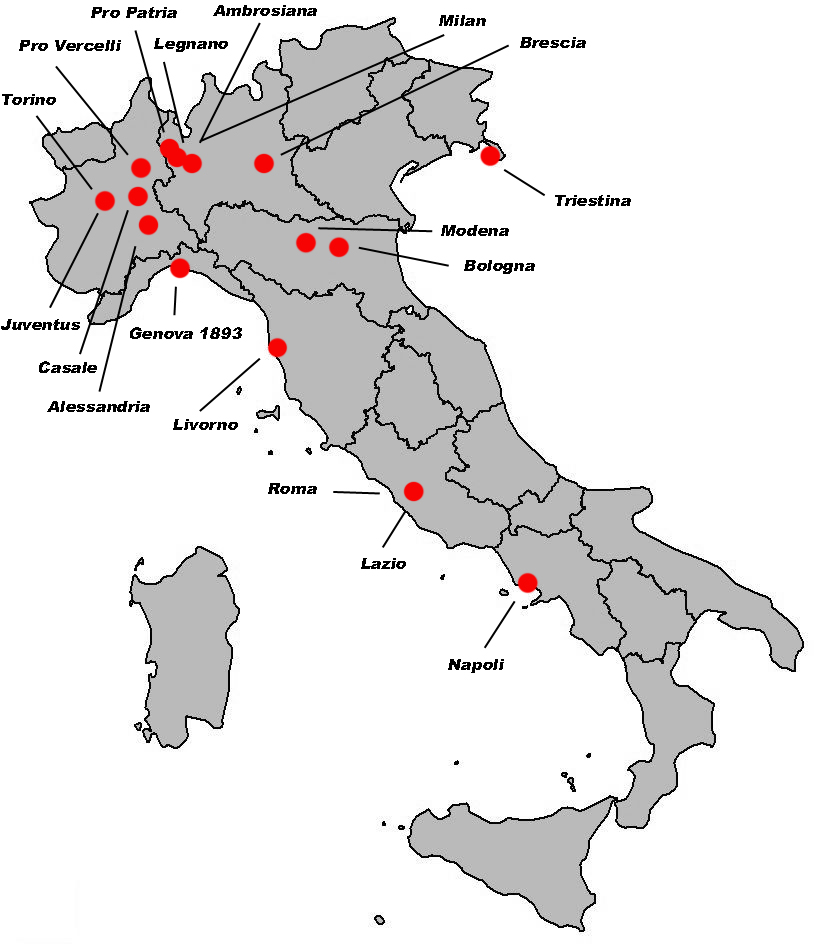
Serie A 1930-31 teams distribution

== Teams ==
Casale and Legnano had been promoted from Serie B.

== Final classification ==
| Pos | Team | Pld | W | D | L | GF | GA | GD | Pts | Qualification or relegation |
|---|---|---|---|---|---|---|---|---|---|---|
| 1 | Juventus (C) | 34 | 25 | 5 | 4 | 79 | 37 | +42 | 55 | 1931 Mitropa Cup |
| 2 | Roma | 34 | 22 | 7 | 5 | 87 | 31 | +56 | 51 | 1931 Mitropa Cup |
| 3 | Bologna | 34 | 21 | 6 | 7 | 81 | 33 | +48 | 48 | |
| 4 | Genova 1893 | 34 | 22 | 3 | 9 | 58 | 47 | +11 | 47 | |
| 5 | Ambrosiana | 34 | 15 | 8 | 11 | 60 | 45 | +15 | 38 | |
| 6 | Napoli | 34 | 18 | 1 | 15 | 54 | 49 | +5 | 37 | |
| 7 | Torino | 34 | 14 | 8 | 12 | 52 | 43 | +9 | 36 | |
| 8 | Lazio | 34 | 15 | 5 | 14 | 45 | 44 | +1 | 35 | |
| 9 | Brescia | 34 | 13 | 8 | 13 | 51 | 55 | −4 | 34 | |
| 10 | Pro Vercelli | 34 | 13 | 7 | 14 | 60 | 60 | 0 | 33 | |
| 10 | Modena | 34 | 14 | 5 | 15 | 61 | 66 | −5 | 33 | |
| 12 | Milan | 34 | 12 | 7 | 15 | 48 | 53 | −5 | 31 | |
| 13 | Alessandria | 34 | 10 | 6 | 18 | 52 | 67 | −15 | 26 | |
| 14 | Triestina | 34 | 8 | 9 | 17 | 32 | 55 | −23 | 25 | |
| 15 | Pro Patria | 34 | 8 | 7 | 19 | 37 | 61 | −24 | 23 | |
| 16 | Casale | 34 | 8 | 5 | 21 | 31 | 64 | −33 | 21 | |
| 17 | Livorno (R) | 34 | 6 | 8 | 20 | 34 | 71 | −37 | 20 | Relegation to Serie B |
| 18 | Legnano (R) | 34 | 6 | 7 | 21 | 30 | 71 | −41 | 19 | Relegation to Serie B |

Source: Panini
(C) Champions; (R) Relegated

== Results ==
| Home \ Away | ALE | AMB | BOL | BRE | CSL | GEN | JUV | LAZ | LEG | LIV | MIL | MOD | NAP | PPA | PVE | ROM | TOR | TRI |
|---|---|---|---|---|---|---|---|---|---|---|---|---|---|---|---|---|---|---|
| Alessandria | | 2–0 | 1–6 | 4–0 | 2–0 | 0–1 | 2–3 | 1–3 | 5–0 | 2–2 | 3–0 | 1–1 | 4–3 | 4–1 | 0–1 | 0–2 | 1–1 | 4–1 |
| Ambrosiana-Inter | 2–0 | | 0–1 | 3–3 | 5–1 | 2–0 | 2–3 | 3–2 | 3–0 | 1–1 | 1–1 | 0–0 | 2–1 | 2–1 | 6–1 | 5–0 | 3–0 | 1–0 |
| Bologna | 0–0 | 4–1 | | 7–1 | 6–1 | 1–1 | 4–0 | 4–0 | 2–1 | 5–0 | 2–2 | 2–0 | 2–0 | 4–1 | 3–0 | 3–3 | 3–0 | 6–1 |
| Brescia | 7–3 | 0–0 | 2–0 | | 2–0 | 1–2 | 1–1 | 2–0 | 2–1 | 1–1 | 3–0 | 1–2 | 0–1 | 3–1 | 2–2 | 3–2 | 2–1 | 1–0 |
| Casale | 0–0 | 1–0 | 1–2 | 0–0 | | 1–0 | 0–1 | 0–2 | 1–1 | 3–2 | 3–2 | 3–1 | 0–2 | 4–0 | 2–2 | 0–3 | 3–1 | 2–3 |
| Genova 1893 | 5–1 | 1–0 | 3–1 | 1–2 | 1–0 | | 0–3 | 2–0 | 5–0 | 3–2 | 2–1 | 5–3 | 4–2 | 1–0 | 1–0 | 0–0 | 3–2 | 1–0 |
| Juventus | 4–1 | 1–0 | 2–0 | 3–0 | 2–0 | 4–1 | | 3–1 | 1–0 | 4–1 | 3–3 | 4–1 | 1–2 | 4–1 | 5–1 | 3–2 | 2–0 | 4–0 |
| Lazio | 3–1 | 1–0 | 2–0 | 2–1 | 1–0 | 5–0 | 2–1 | | 4–0 | 3–2 | 1–2 | 2–0 | 0–1 | 1–1 | 1–2 | 2–2 | 0–0 | 1–0 |
| Legnano | 1–0 | 2–2 | 0–2 | 2–2 | 1–0 | 2–1 | 1–2 | 0–1 | | 3–0 | 1–2 | 6–2 | 2–0 | 0–0 | 2–2 | 0–0 | 0–1 | 1–1 |
| Livorno | 1–0 | 0–2 | 0–2 | 0–1 | 5–0 | 1–2 | 1–1 | 0–0 | 2–1 | | 0–0 | 0–2 | 1–2 | 1–0 | 3–1 | 1–3 | 1–1 | 3–2 |
| Milan | 1–1 | 1–4 | 1–2 | 1–0 | 4–0 | 1–2 | 0–3 | 0–1 | 2–0 | 5–0 | | 3–1 | 2–3 | 1–1 | 2–1 | 0–2 | 1–1 | 2–0 |
| Modena | 3–2 | 2–5 | 0–2 | 3–2 | 5–1 | 4–2 | 1–2 | 3–0 | 4–1 | 4–1 | 3–0 | | 2–0 | 3–1 | 1–3 | 1–1 | 2–0 | 2–0 |
| Napoli | 3–2 | 0–2 | 2–0 | 3–1 | 1–0 | 0–1 | 1–2 | 2–0 | 2–1 | 2–0 | 0–1 | 4–1 | | 1–0 | 1–0 | 3–0 | 0–2 | 5–1 |
| Pro Patria | 0–1 | 1–1 | 1–2 | 3–0 | 1–0 | 2–3 | 1–3 | 3–1 | 2–0 | 0–0 | 2–1 | 3–2 | 3–2 | | 2–2 | 0–4 | 1–2 | 2–1 |
| Pro Vercelli | 6–2 | 1–1 | 2–0 | 2–0 | 1–1 | 0–1 | 1–3 | 3–0 | 8–0 | 3–1 | 0–2 | 3–0 | 6–3 | 2–1 | | 0–3 | 1–0 | 2–2 |
| Roma | 2–0 | 2–1 | 2–1 | 3–0 | 3–1 | 5–0 | 5–0 | 1–1 | 3–0 | 7–1 | 1–2 | 4–0 | 3–1 | 2–0 | 5–0 | | 5–1 | 3–0 |
| Torino | 4–1 | 6–0 | 1–1 | 1–1 | 1–0 | 0–2 | 1–1 | 2–0 | 5–0 | 4–0 | 3–1 | 1–1 | 3–1 | 3–1 | 1–0 | 1–4 | | 2–0 |
| Triestina | 0–1 | 5–0 | 1–1 | 0–4 | 1–2 | 1–1 | 0–0 | 2–1 | 1–0 | 1–0 | 3–1 | 1–1 | 0–0 | 0–0 | 3–1 | 0–0 | 1–0 | |

Source: Almanacco Illustrato del Calcio - La Storia 1898-2004, Panini Edizioni, Modena, September 2005 (in Italian)
Legend: Blue = home team win; Yellow = draw; Red = away team win.

== Top goalscorers ==
| Rank | Player | Club | Goals |
|---|---|---|---|
| 1 | (Italy) Rodolfo Volk | Roma | 29 |
| 2 | (Italy) Giuseppe Meazza | Ambrosiana-Inter | 24 |
| 3 | (Italy) Antonio Vojak | Napoli | 20 |
| 3 | (Argentina) (Italy) Raimundo Orsi | Juventus | 20 |
| 5 | (Italy) Carlo Reguzzoni | Bologna | 18 |
| 6 | (Italy) Cesare Augusto Fasanelli | Roma | 17 |
| 7 | (Italy) Giovanni Ferrari | Juventus | 16 |
| 7 | (Italy) Giovanni Vecchina | Juventus | 16 |
| 7 | (Italy) Elvio Banchero | Genoa | 16 |
| 7 | (Italy) Alfredo Mazzoni | Modena | 16 |
| 7 | (Italy) Angelo Schiavio | Bologna | 16 |
| 12 | (Italy) Ettore Banchero | Alessandria | 15 |
| 13 | (Argentina) (Italy) Julio Libonatti | Torino | 14 |
| 13 | (Italy) Bruno Maini | Bologna | 14 |
| 15 | (Italy) Federico Munerati | Juventus | 13 |
| 15 | (Italy) Silvio Piola | Pro Vercelli | 13 |
| 15 | (Italy) Pietro Pastore | Milan | 13 |
| 18 | (Argentina) (Italy) Arturo Chini Ludueña | Roma | 12 |
| 18 | (Italy) Marcello Mihalich | Napoli | 12 |
| 18 | (Italy) Rocco Ranelli | Brescia | 12 |

== References and sources ==
- Almanacco Illustrato del Calcio - La Storia 1898-2004, Panini Edizioni, Modena, September 2005
