= 1933–34 FBC Juventus season =

Italian football club season

Foot-Ball Club Juventus
1933-34 season
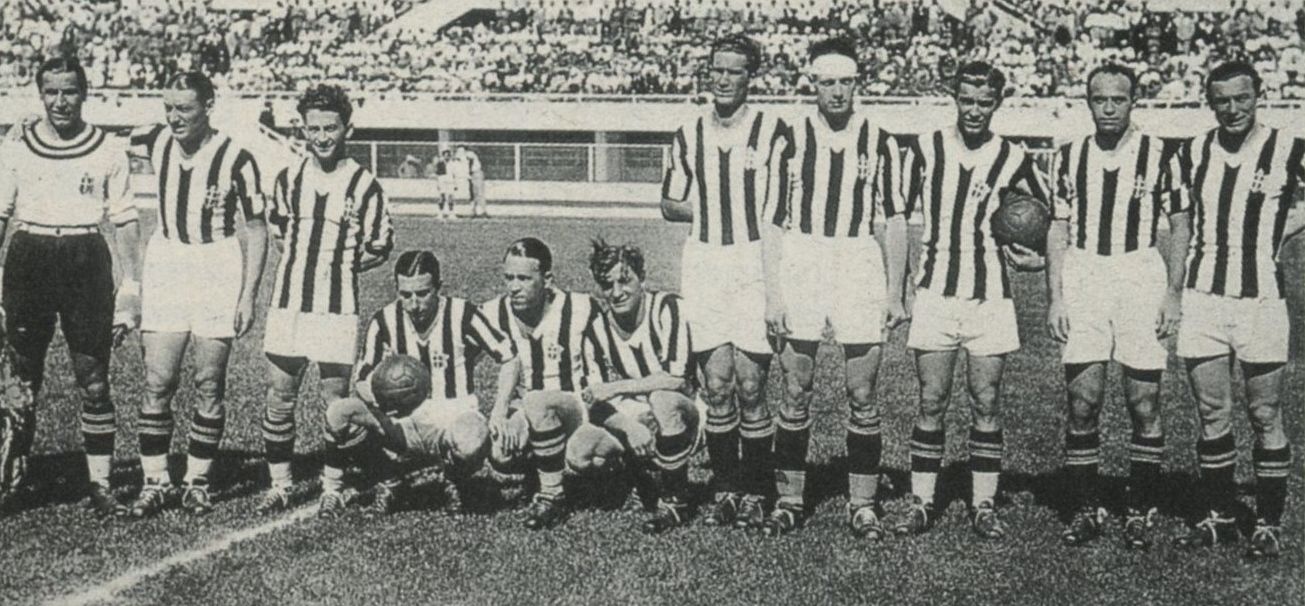
- President: Edoardo Agnelli
- Manager: Carlo Carcano
- Stadium: Stadio Benito Mussolini
- Serie A: 1st (in Mitropa Cup)
- Mitropa Cup: Semifinals
- Top goalscorer: League: Borel (31); All: Felice Borel (31)
Home colours

In the 1933–34 season Foot-Ball Club Juventus competed in Serie A and Mitropa Cup.

== Summary ==
During this season Juventus became 'club of Italy' thanks to the 16 players competing with the National Football Team of Italy in the 1933-35 International Cup

The squad made a big domain of the tournament with 53 points (4 more than Ambrosiana-Inter) due to 23 wins and 7 draws clinched the fourth title in a row. After the campaign, goalkeeper Combi is retired with eleven seasons in the club.

Also, the club sent a big pack of players to the 1934 FIFA World Cup: Gianpiero Combi, Virginio Rosetta, Luigi Bertolini, Felice Borel II, Umberto Caligaris, Giovanni Ferrari, Luis Monti, Raimundo Orsi et Mario Varglien I (5 out of 9 were starting players). Italy clinched the world cup being nicknamed Nazio-Juve

== Squad ==
Note: Flags indicate national team as defined under FIFA eligibility rules; some limited exceptions apply. Players may hold more than one non-FIFA nationality.

Pos.	Nation	Player
GK	ITA	Gianpiero Combi
GK	ITA	Cesare Valinasso
DF	ITA	Umberto Caligaris
DF	ITA	Mario Ferrero
DF	ITA	Virginio Rosetta (Captain)
DF	ITA	Giovanni Varglien II
MF	ITA	Luigi Bertolini
MF	ITA	Teobaldo Depetrini

Pos.	Nation	Player
MF	ITA	Luis Monti
MF	ITA	Mario Varglien I
FW	ITA	Felice Borel II
FW	ITA	Renato Cesarini
FW	ITA	Giovanni Ferrari
FW	ITA	Marcello Mihalich
FW	ITA	Raimundo Orsi
FW	ITA	Pietro Sernagiotto

== Competitions ==
=== Serie A ===
==== League table ====
Pos	Team	Pld	W	D	L	GF	GA	GD	Pts	Qualification or relegation
1	Juventus (C)	34	23	7	4	88	31	+57	53	1934 Mitropa Cup
2	Ambrosiana-Inter	34	20	9	5	66	24	+42	49	1934 Mitropa Cup
3	Napoli	34	19	8	7	46	30	+16	46	1934 Mitropa Cup
4	Bologna	34	16	10	8	53	33	+20	42	1934 Mitropa Cup
5	Roma	34	16	8	10	56	32	+24	40	

Source: Panini
(C) Champions

==== Matches ====
10 September 1933 1	Juventus	4–1	Livorno	Turin
	Sernagiotto 19'; Borel 60', 61'; Cesarini 77'	Report	68' Busoni	Stadium: Stadio Benito Mussolini; Referee: Carminati

17 September 1933 2	Alessandria	2–1	Juventus	Alessandria
	Riccardi 11'; Cattaneo 75'	Report	53' Cesarini	Stadium: Stadio del Littorio

24 September 1933 3	Juventus	6–1	Casale	Turin
	Sernagiotto 23'; Monti 28'; Cesarini 35'; Borel 60'; Ferrari 64', 75'	Report	4' Cornara	Stadium: Stadio Benito Mussolini; Referee: Carcano

1 October 1933 4	Roma	2–3	Juventus	Rome
	Guaita 2'; Scopelli 41'	Report	36', 46', 85' Borel	Stadium: Campo Testaccio; Referee: Caironi

8 October 1933 5	Juventus	4–0	Torino	Turin
	Cesarini 12'; Ferrari 37'; Borel 47'; Sernagiotto 90'	Report		Stadium: Stadio Benito Mussolini; Referee: Barlassina

15 October 1933 6	Palermo	0–1	Juventus	Palermo
		Report	32' Borel	Stadium: Stadio Littorio; Referee: Melandri

29 October 1933 7	Juventus	1–1	Triestina	Turin
	Borel 16'	Report	46' Palumbo	Stadium: Stadio Benito Mussolini; Referee: Bevilacqua

1 November 1933 8	Napoli	2–0	Juventus	Naples
	Vojak 26' (pen.); Buscaglia 61'	Report		Stadium: Stadio Partenopeo; Referee: Bonivento

5 November 1933 9	Juventus	5–0	Fiorentina	Turin
	Varglien II 15'; Pizziolo 59' (o.g.); Borel 69', 71'; Ferrari 86'	Report		Stadium: Stadio Benito Mussolini; Referee: Scorzoni

12 November 1933 10	Ambrosiana-Inter	3–2	Juventus	Milan
14:30	Meazza 47'; Frione 61'; Levratto 85'	Report	49' Borel; 67' Varglien I	Stadium: San Siro; Referee: Dattilo

19 November 1933 11	Juventus	8–1	Genoa	Turin
	Cesarini 4', 87', 90'; Borel 43', 58'; Orsi 62', 71'; Ferrari 70'	Report	12' Patri	Stadium: Stadio Benito Mussolini; Referee: Caironi

26 November 1933 12	Juventus	5–1	Brescia	Turin
	Orsi 40', 67'; Borel 49', 66', 69'	Report	44' Perini	Stadium: Stadio Benito Mussolini; Referee: Salvagno

10 December 1933 13	Milan	3–1	Juventus	Milan
	Moretti 1', 74'; Caligaris 60' (o.g.)	Report	16' Cesarini	Stadium: Stadio San Siro; Referee: Bertoli

21 December 1933 14	Bologna	2–2	Juventus	Bologna
14:30hs	Montesanto 67'; Fedullo 80'	Report	43' Bertolini; 58' Ferrari	Stadium: Stadio Littoriale; Referee: Bevilacqua

24 December 1933 15	Juventus	2–2	Lazio	Turin
14:30 hs	Monti 40'; Bertagni 74' (o.g.)	Report	5', 84' Fantoni III	Stadium: Stadio Benito Mussolini; Referee: Mazza

31 December 1933 16	Padova	1–2	Juventus	Padua
14:30	Busini 20'	Report	21' Sernagiotto; 45' Borel	Stadium: Stadio Silvio Appiani

7 January 1934 17	Juventus	3–0	Pro Vercelli	Turin
	Borel 50', 89'; Varglien II 62'	Report		Stadium: Stadio Benito Mussolini; Referee: Mazzarini

14 January 1934 18	Livorno	0–0	Juventus	Livorno
14:30		Report		Stadium: Stadio Edda Ciano Mussolini; Referee: Melandri

21 January 1934 19	Juventus	3–1	Alessandria	Turin
	Ferrari 43'; Borel 55'; Depetrini 72'	Report	80' Cattaneo	Stadium: Stadio Benito Mussolini; Referee: Barlassina

28 January 1934 20	Casale	0–3	Juventus	Casale Monferrato
		Report	5' Borel; 15' Depetrini; 68' Ferrari	Stadium: Stadio Natale Palli; Referee: Carraro

4 February 1933 21	Juventus	3–1	Roma	Turin
14:30	Borel 14'; Varglien II 27'; Ferrari 83'	Report	47' Scopelli	Stadium: Stadio Benito Mussolini; Referee: Melandri

18 February 1934 22	Torino	1–2	Juventus	Turin
15:00	Bo 69'	Report	50' Borel; 76' Varglien II	Stadium: Stadio Filadelfia; Referee: Bevilacqua

25 February 1934 23	Juventus	1–1	Palermo	Turin
15:00	Ferrari 62'	Report	88' Faotto	Stadium: Stadio Benito Mussolini; Referee: Gianni

4 March 1934 24	Triestina	0–1	Juventus	Triestina
		Report	50' Borel	Stadium: Stadio Littorio; Referee: Scorzoni

11 March 1934 25	Juventus	2–0	Napoli	Turin
	Monti 19' (pen.); Borel 82'	Report		Stadium: Stadio Benito Mussolini; Referee: Carraro

18 March 1934 26	Fiorentina	2–2	Juventus	Florence
	Prendato 17'; Gringa 67'	Report	13' Varglien II; 40' Borel	Stadium: Stadio Giovanni Berta; Referee: Melandri

29 March 1934 31	Juventus	4–1	Bologna	Turin
	Varglien II 21'; Orsi 36' (pen.); Ferrari 57'; Monti 77' (pen.)	Report	25' Fedullo	Stadium: Stadio Benito Mussolini; Referee: Mazzarini

1 April 1934 27	Juventus	0–0	Ambrosiana-Inter	Turin
		Report		Stadium: Stadio Benito Mussolini; Referee: Scorzoni

8 April 1934 28	Genoa	0–2	Juventus	Genoa
		Report	32' Borel; 73' Varglien II	Stadium: Stade Luigi-Ferraris; Referee: Barlassina

12 April 1934 33	Juventus	5–1	Padova	Turin
	Ferrari 1', 10'; Borel 22'; Orsi 44'; Sernagiotto 86'	Report	61' Spivach	Stadium: Stadio Benito Mussolini; Referee: Bevilacqua

15 April 1934 29	Brescia	1–2	Juventus	Lombardy
	Bianchi 9'	Report	3' Varglien II; 23' Orsi	Stadium: Stadio Mario-Rigamonti; Referee: Carraro

22 April 1934 30	Juventus	4–0	Milan	Turin
	Ferrari 5', 10'; Borel 15'; Sernagiotto 49'	Report		Stadium: Stadio Benito Mussolini; Referee: Ciamberlini

25 April 1934 34	Pro Vercelli	0–2	Juventus	Vercelli
		Report	25' Ferrari; 67' Sernagiotto	Stadium: Stadio Leonida Robbiano; Referee: Bevilacqua

29 April 1934 32	Lazio	0–2	Juventus	Rome
		Report	49' Orsi; 80' Borel	Stadium: Stadio Nazionale del P.N.F. Referee: Melandri

== Statistics ==
=== Squad statistics ===
Goalkeepers
(Italy) Gianpiero Combi
(Italy) Cesare Valinasso

Defenders
(Italy) Umberto Caligaris
(Italy) Pietro Ferrero
(Italy) Virginio Rosetta (Captain)
(Italy) Giovanni Varglien II

Midfielders
(Italy) Luigi Bertolini
(Italy) Teobaldo Depetrini
(Argentina) Luis Monti
(Italy) Mario Varglien I

Forwards
(Italy) Felice Borel
(Argentina) Renato Cesarini
(Italy) Giovanni Ferrari
(Italy) Marcello Mihalich
(Argentina) Raimundo Orsi
(Brazil) Pietro Sernagiotto

Manager
(Italy) Carlo Carcano

=== Goalscorers ===
36 goals

- (Italy) Felice Borel

18 goals

- (Italy) Giovanni Ferrari

10 goals

- (Italy) (Argentina) Renato Cesarini
- (Italy) (Argentina) Raimundo Orsi

9 goals

- (Italy) Giovanni Varglien

7 goals

- (Italy) (Brazil) Pietro Sernagiotto

4 goals

- (Italy) (Argentina) Luis Monti

2 goals

- (Italy) Teobaldo Depetrini

1 goal

- (Italy) Luigi Bertolini
- (Italy) Mario Varglien
