= List of Juventus FC players =

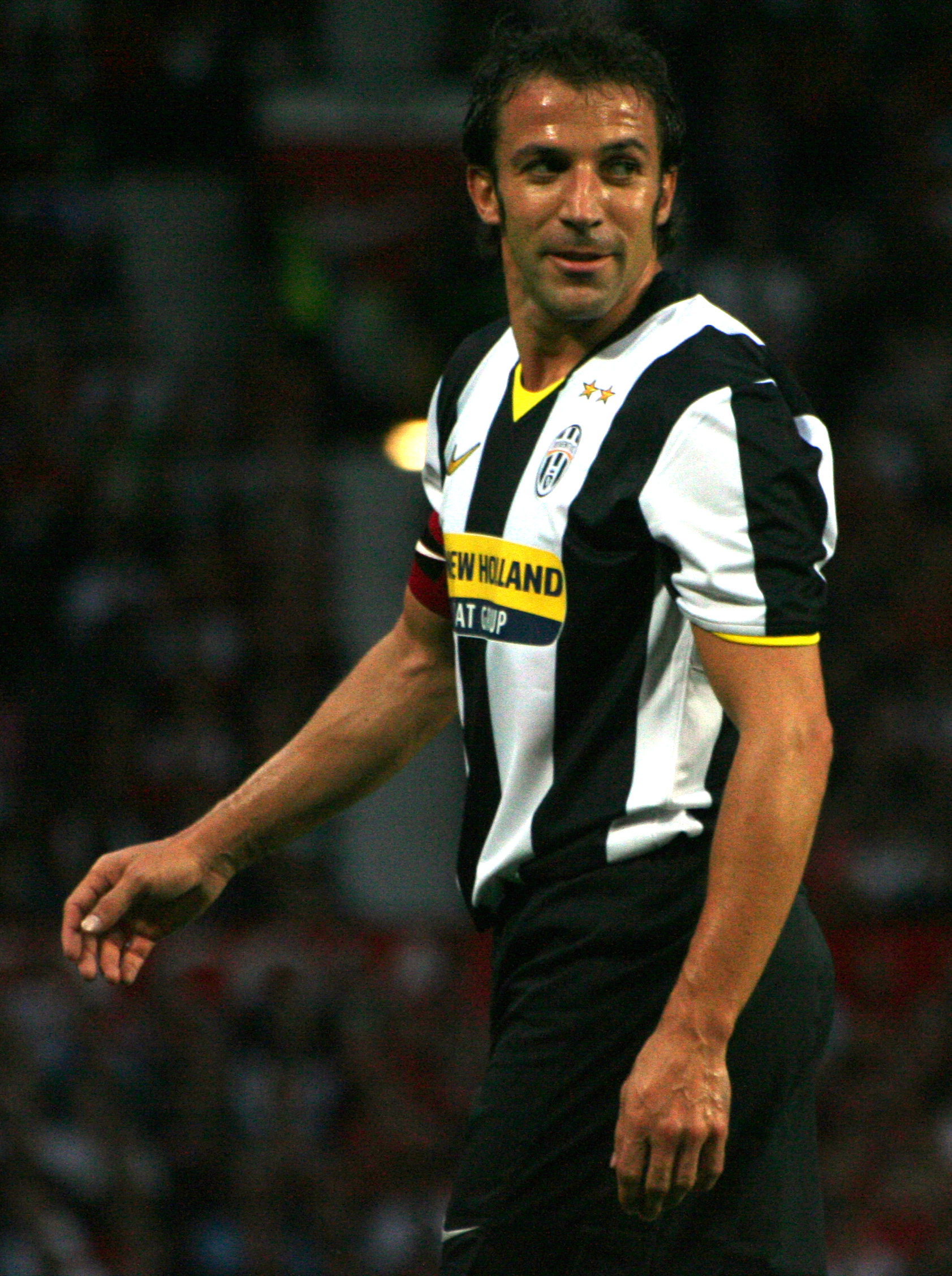
Alessandro Del Piero made 705 appearances for Juventus and he is the all-time top scorer of the club, with 290 goals.

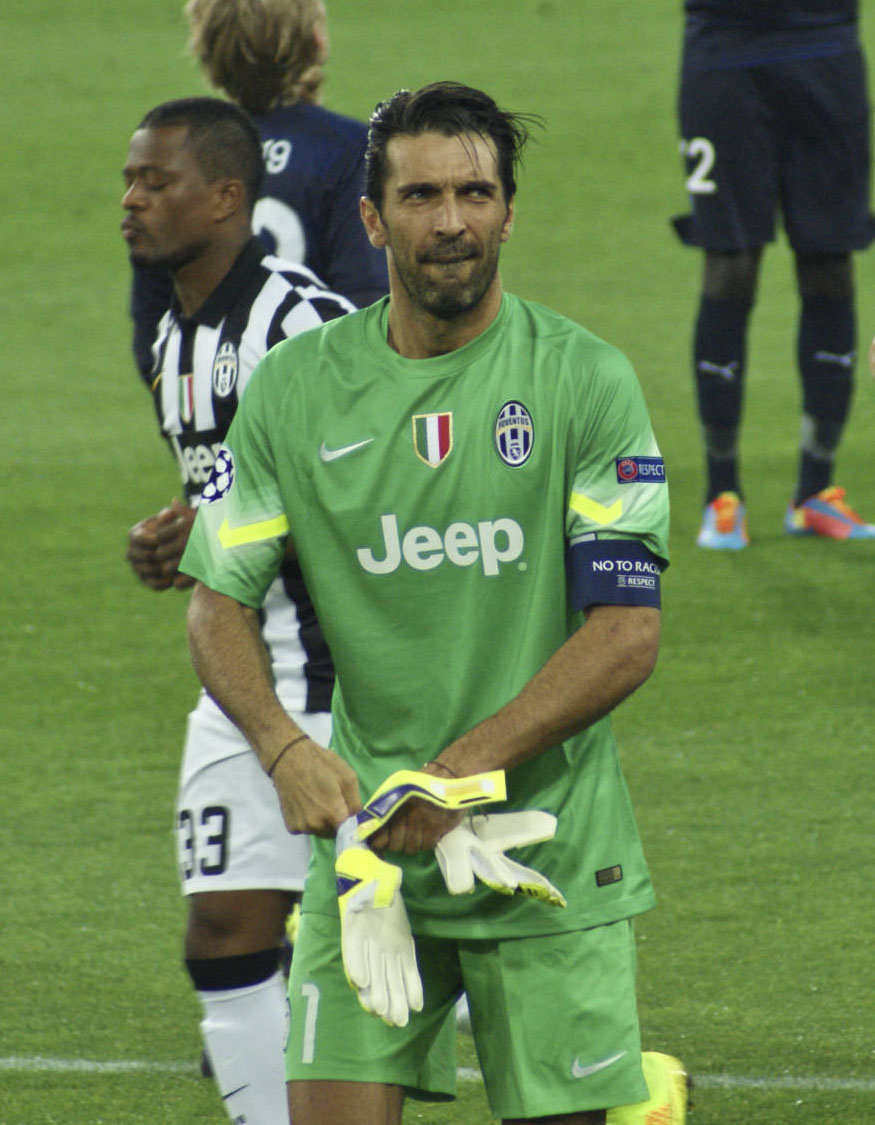
Gianluigi Buffon, second most appearances for Juventus

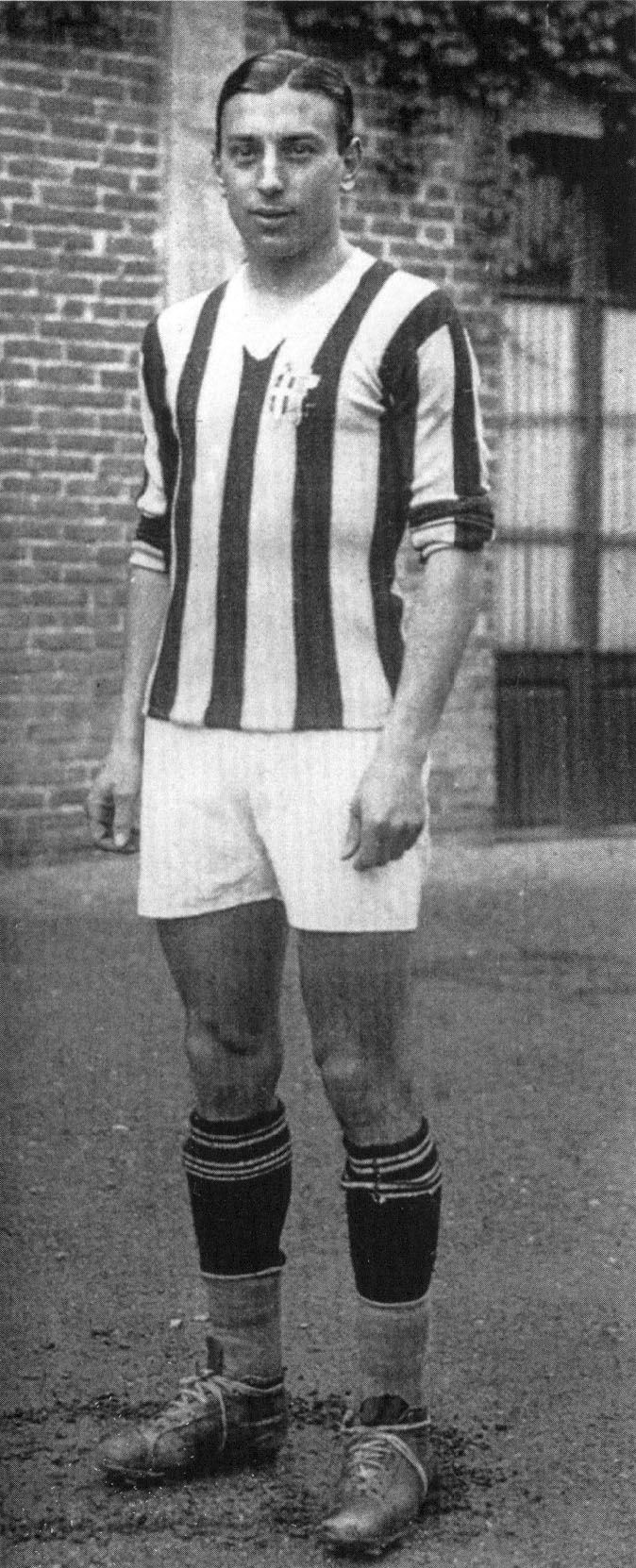
Raimundo Orsi, a five-time champion with Juventus

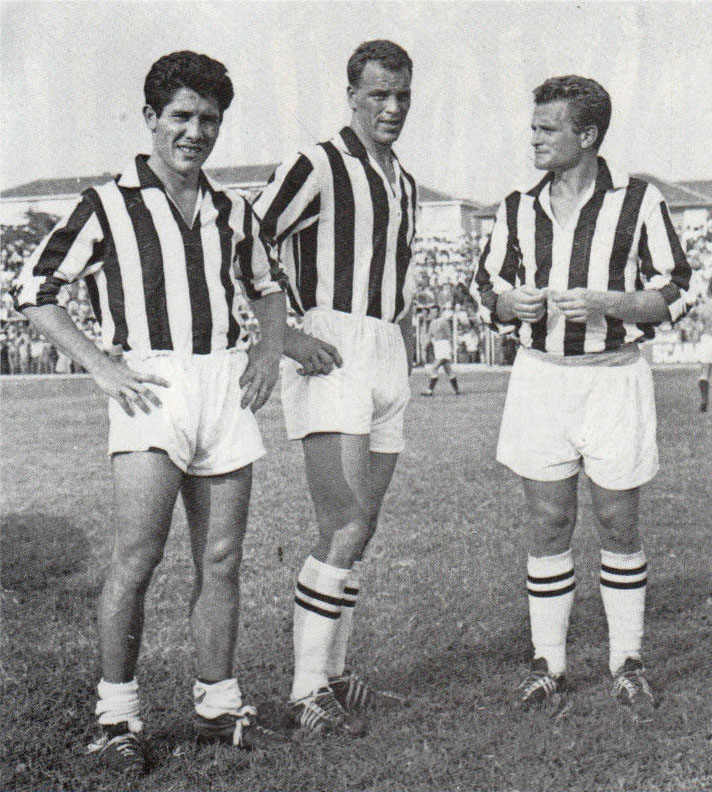
Omar Sívori, John Charles, and Giampiero Boniperti, the Magical Trio of the Juventus squad during the ending of 1950s and beginning of 1960s

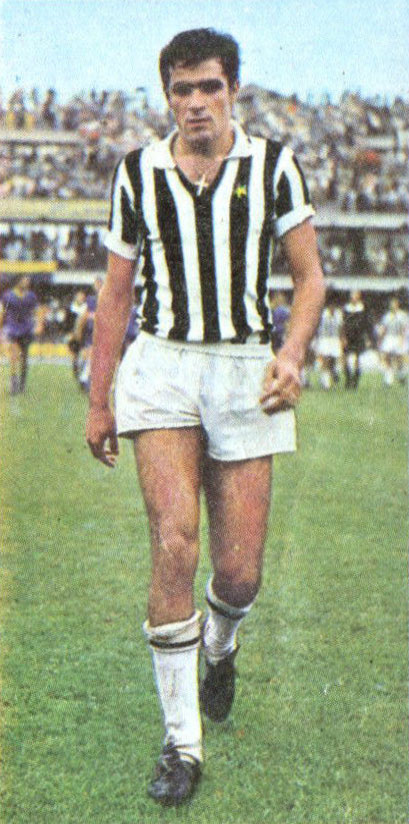
Antonello Cuccureddu played 433 matches and scored 39 goals in Juventus.

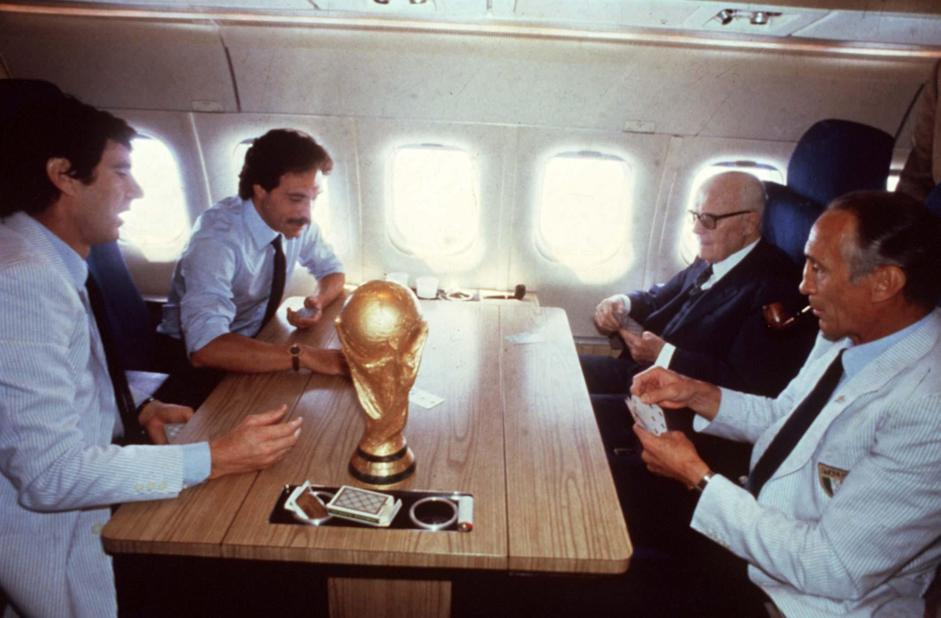
Dino Zoff (near left) and Franco Causio (high left) respectively played for Juventus' 476 and 447 games

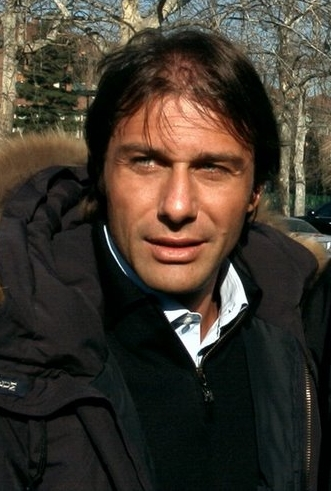
Antonio Conte played 419 games and scored 44 goals.

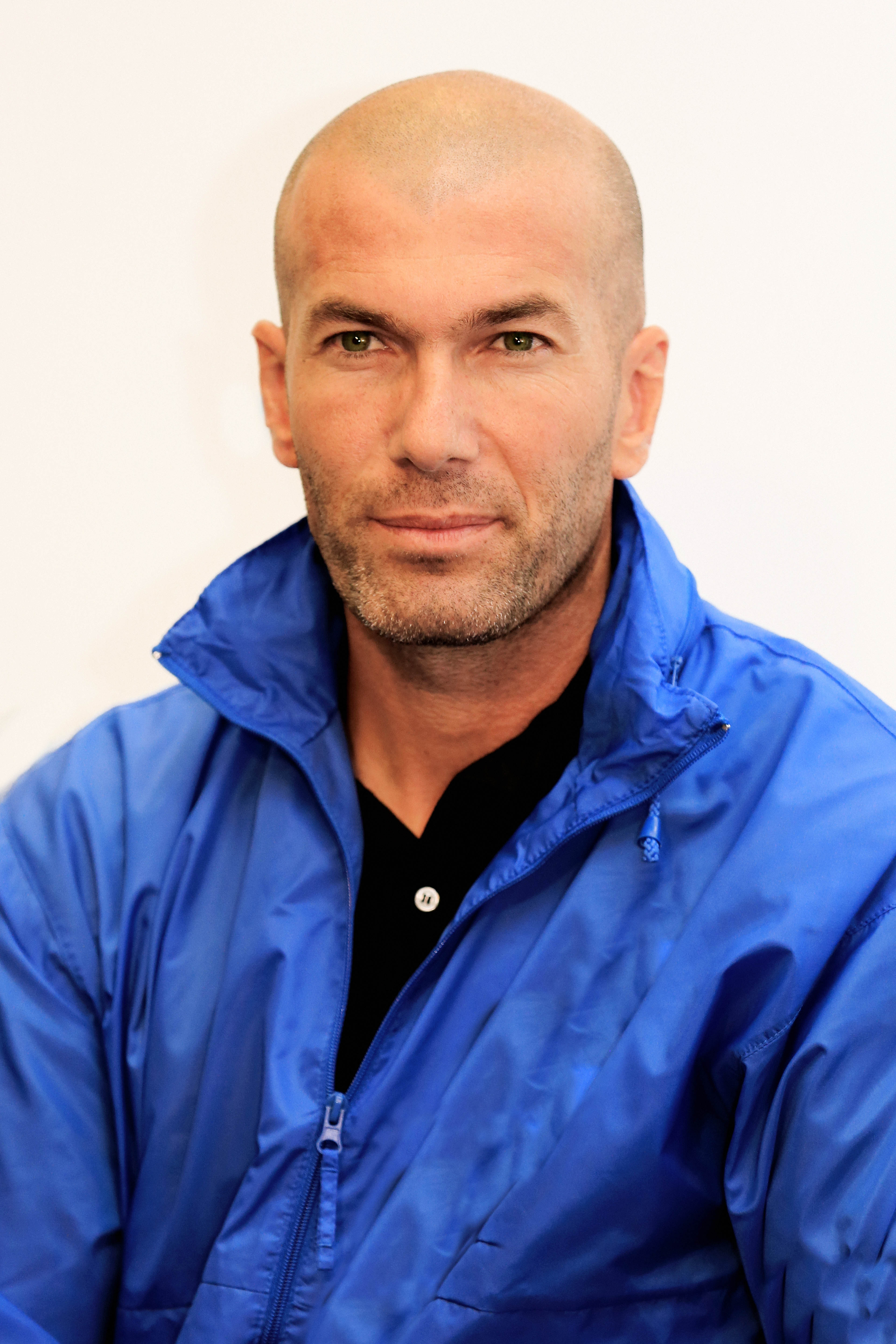
Zinedine Zidane won the 1998 Ballon d'Or

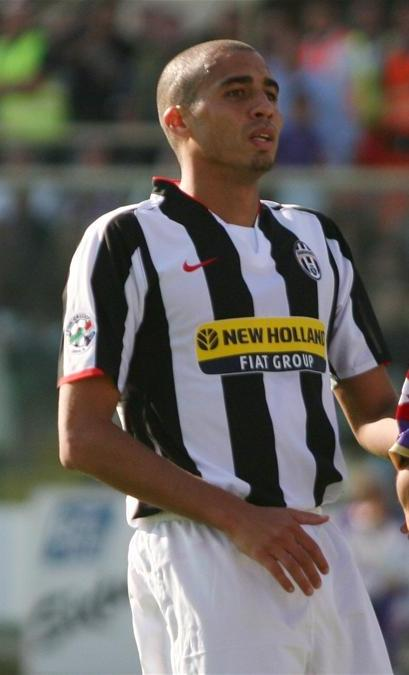
David Trezeguet is the best foreign scorer in the history of Juventus with 171 goals.

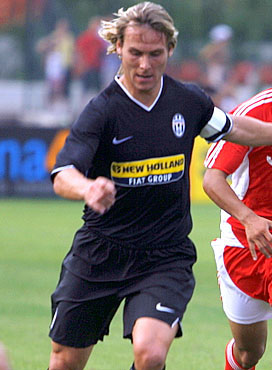
Pavel Nedvěd played for Juventus 327 games and scored 65 goals, and was the winner of the 2003 Ballon d'Or.

Juventus is a Turin-based football club, the most successful Italian football club. During the centenary history of Juventus, over 700 footballers player for the club.

== List of players ==
Statistics correct as of 23 June 2026. Players with 100 or more appearances for the club are listed in alphabetical order. Appearances and goals are for ALL first-team competitive matches. (Note: From 1915 to 1919, the Italian football championship was interrupted as consequence of World War I. The 1915–16 Coppa Federale tournament is not recognised by the Italian Football Federation (FIGC, its statistics are not included in this article). From 1943 to 1945, the Italian football championship was interrupted as consequence of World War II. The 1944 Campionato Alta Italia was not recognised by the FIGC until 2002. Starting with the 1945–46 Italian Football Championship, the top level of Italian football was composed for two groups with Serie A and Serie B teams playing together. The 1944 war championship and the 1945–46 season statistics are included in this article.) Substitute appearances included. Bold denotes current Juventus players.

Player	Nationality	Position ^{[NB]}	Juventus career	Appearances	Goals
Angelo Alessio	Italy	Midfielder	1987–1992	142	21
José Altafini	Brazil/Italy	Forward	1972–1976	119	37
Amauri	Brazil/Italy	Forward	2008–2011	100	24
Nicola Amoruso	Italy	Forward	1996–2002	105	29
Pietro Anastasi	Italy	Forward	1968–1976	307	132
Roberto Anzolin	Italy	Goalkeeper	1961–1970	321	0
Kwadwo Asamoah	Ghana	Midfielder	2012–2018	156	5
Roberto Baggio	Italy	Forward	1990–1995	200	115
Oreste Barale IIIº	Italy	Midfielder	1924–1931	116	1
Andrea Barzagli	Italy	Defender	2011–2019	281	2
Savino Bellini	Italy	Forward	1937–1944	126	34
Romeo Benetti	Italy	Forward	1968–1979	159	23
Rodrigo Bentancur	Uruguay	Midfielder	2017–2022	181	3
Giancarlo Bercellino Iº	Italy	Defender	1961–1969	211	14
Federico Bernardeschi	Italy	Forward	2017–2022	183	12
Luigi Bertolini	Italy	Midfielder	1930–1937	161	5
Alberto Bertuccelli	Italy	Defender	1949–1954	146	2
Roberto Bettega	Italy	Forward	1970–1983	482	179
Carlo Bigatto Iº	Italy	Midfielder	1913–1931	243	2
Alessandro Birindelli	Italy	Defender	1997–2008	305	7
Zbigniew Boniek	Poland	Forward	1982–1985	133	31
Massimo Bonini	San Marino	Midfielder	1981–1989	301	6
Giampiero Boniperti	Italy	Forward	1946–1961	459	182
Leonardo Bonucci	Italy	Defender	2010–2017; 2018–2023	502	37
Felice Borel IIº	Italy	Forward	1932–1941; 1942–1946	308	163
**Gleison Bremer**	Brazil	Defender	2022–present	122	12
Sergio Brio	Italy	Defender	1978–1990	385	24
Gianluigi Buffon	Italy	Goalkeeper	2001–2018; 2019–2021	685	0
Antonio Cabrini	Italy	Defender	1976–1989	460 (Note: By the date of 3 October 2017, Cabrini was officially recorded 440 appearances with Juventus FC and at 11th place in club history. See "Chiellini enters Juventus Top Ten". Juventus.com.)	52
Martín Cáceres	Uruguay	Defender	2009–2010; 2012–2016; 2019	119	7
Umberto Caligaris	Italy	Defender	1928–1935	198	0
**Andrea Cambiaso**	Italy	Defender	2023–present	130	8
Mauro Camoranesi	Argentina/Italy	Midfielder	2002–2010	288	32
Fabio Cannavaro	Italy	Defender	2004–2006; 2009–2010	128	7
Fabio Capello	Italy	Midfielder	1970–1976	240	41
Massimo Carrera	Italy	Defender	1991–1996	166	1
Pierluigi Casiraghi	Italy	Forward	1989–1993	147	37
Ernesto Càstano	Italy	Defender	1958–1970	352	3
Franco Causio	Italy	Midfielder	1967–1968; 1970–1981	447	72
Renato Cesarini	Argentina/Italy	Forward	1929–1935	147	53
John Charles	Wales	Forward	1957–1962	186	109
Giorgio Chiellini	Italy	Defender	2004–2022	561	36
Federico Chiesa	Italy	Forward	2020–2024	131	32
Cinesinho	Brazil	Forward	1964–1968	119	10
Umberto Colombo	Italy	Forward	1954–1961	197	25
Gianpiero Combi	Italy	Goalkeeper	1921–1934	369	0
Antonio Conte	Italy	Midfielder	1991–2004	419	44
Giuseppe Corradi	Italy	Defender	1951–1959	203	5
Douglas Costa	Brazil	Forward	2017–2020	103	10
Juan Cuadrado	Colombia	Midfielder	2015–2023	314	26
Antonello Cuccureddu	Italy	Defender	1969–1981	438	39
Danilo	Brazil	Defender	2019–2025	213	9
Edgar Davids	Netherlands	Midfielder	1997–2004	235	10
Luigi De Agostini	Italy	Defender	1987–1992	215	28
Paolo De Ceglie	Italy	Defender	2006–2017	129	2
Matthijs De Ligt	Netherlands	Defender	2019–2022	117	8
Mattia De Sciglio	Italy	Defender	2017–2025	117	2
Alessandro Del Piero	Italy	Forward	1993–2012	705	290
Luis del Sol	Spain	Midfielder	1962–1970	300	31
Teobaldo Depetrini	Italy	Midfielder	1933–1949	388	10
Didier Deschamps	France	Midfielder	1994–1999	178	4
Paolo Di Canio	Italy	Forward	1990–1993	112	7
Angelo Di Livio	Italy	Midfielder	1993–1999	269	6
Paulo Dybala	Argentina	Forward	2015–2022	293	115
Flavio Emoli	Italy	Midfielder	1955–1963	251	10
Pietro Fanna	Italy	Midfielder	1977–1982	152	20
Luciano Favero	Italy	Defender	1984–1989	206	2
Ciro Ferrara	Italy	Defender	1994–2005	358	20
Giovanni Ferrari	Italy	Forward	1930–1942	193	78
Rino Ferrario	Italy	Midfielder	1950–1955; 1957–1959	156	6
Alfredo Foni	Italy	Defender	1934–1947	304	8
Giuseppe Furino	Italy	Midfielder	1969–1984	528	19
Guglielmo Gabetto	Italy	Forward	1934–1941	191	102
Roberto Galìa	Italy	Midfielder	1988–1994	225	11
Bruno Garzena	Italy	Defender	1952–1953; 1954–1962	188	0
**Federico Gatti**	Italy	Defender	2022–present	137	11
Claudio Gentile	Italy	Defender	1973–1984	417	10
Sebastian Giovinco	Italy	Forward	2006–2015	132	20
Adolfo Gori	Italy	Midfielder	1963–1968	192	6
Zdeněk Grygera	Czech Republic	Defender	2007–2011	114	3
Helmut Haller	Germany	Forward	1968–1973	174	33
John Hansen	Denmark	Forward	1948–1954	189	124
Gonzalo Higuaín	Argentina	Forward	2016–2020	149	66
Vincenzo Iaquinta	Italy	Forward	2007–2012	108	40
Filippo Inzaghi	Italy	Forward	1997–2001	165	89
Mark Iuliano	Italy	Defender	1996–2005	277	7
Júlio César	Brazil	Defender	1990–1994	125	6
Moise Kean	Italy	Forward	2016–2019; 2021–2024	123	22
Sami Khedira	Germany	Midfielder	2015–2021	145	21
Jürgen Kohler	Germany	Defender	1991–1995	145	13
**Filip Kostić**	Serbia	Midfielder	2022–present	112	6
Michael Laudrup	Denmark	Forward	1983–1989	151	35
Nicola Legrottaglie	Italy	Defender	2003–2011	154	9
Gianfranco Leoncini	Italy	Midfielder	1958–1970	395	26
Stephan Lichtsteiner	Switzerland	Defender	2011–2018	257	15
**Manuel Locatelli**	Italy	Midfielder	2021–present	230	9
Ugo Locatelli	Italy	Midfielder	1941–1949	181	8
Pietro Magni	Italy	Defender	1942–1948	108	27
Sergio Manente	Italy	Defender	1948–1955	233	15
Mario Mandžukić	Croatia	Forward	2015–2019	162	44
Giampietro Marchetti	Italy	Midfielder	1970–1974	175	7
Claudio Marchisio	Italy	Midfielder	2006–2018	389	37
Giacomo Mari	Italy	Midfielder	1949–1953	135	9
Giancarlo Marocchi	Italy	Forward	1988–1996	319	25
Domenico Marocchino	Italy	Forward	1979–1983	141	14
Carlo Mattrel	Italy	Goalkeeper	1957–1965	117	0
Blaise Matuidi	France	Midfielder	2017–2020	133	8
Massimo Mauro	Italy	Midfielder	1985–1989	152	7
**Weston McKennie**	United States	Midfielder	2020–present	230	27
Giampaolo Menichelli	Italy	Midfielder	1963–1969	207	64
Paolo Montero	Uruguay	Defender	1996–2005	278	7
Luis Monti	Argentina/Italy	Midfielder	1930–1939	263	22
Antonio Montico	Italy	Midfielder	1953–1962	116	27
Álvaro Morata	Spain	Forward	2014–2016; 2020–2022	185	59
Francesco Morini	Italy	Defender	1969–1979	377	0
Ermes Muccinelli	Italy	Forward	1946–1955; 1957–1959	246	69
Federico Munerati	Italy	Forward	1922–1933	256	114
Pavel Nedvěd	Czech Republic	Midfielder	2001–2009	327	65
Bruno Nicolè	Italy	Forward	1957–1963	179	66
Raimundo Orsi	Argentina/Italy	Forward	1929–1935	194	88
Simone Padoin	Italy	Midfielder	2012–2016	107	3
Carlo Parola	Italy	Defender	1939–1954	339	11
Angelo Peruzzi	Italy	Goalkeeper	1991–1999	301	0
Gianluca Pessotto	Italy	Defender	1995–2006	366	3
Alberto Piccinini	Italy	Midfielder	1949–1953	106	2
Andrea Pirlo	Italy	Midfielder	2011–2015	165	18
Miralem Pjanić	Bosnia and Herzegovina	Midfielder	2016–2020	178	22
Michel Platini	France	Midfielder	1982–1987	224	104
Paul Pogba	France	Midfielder	2012–2016; 2022–2024	190	34
Sergio Porrini	Italy	Defender	1993–1997	138	5
Karl Aage Præst	Denmark	Forward	1949–1956	233	51
Claudio Cesare Prandelli	Italy	Midfielder	1979–1985	138	5
Fabio Quagliarella	Italy	Forward	2010–2014	102	30
Adrien Rabiot	France	Midfielder	2019–2024	212	22
Pietro Rava	Italy	Defender	1935–1950	330	15
Fabrizio Ravanelli	Italy	Forward	1992–1996	160	68
Cristiano Ronaldo	Portugal	Forward	2018–2021	134	101
Virginio Rosetta	Italy	Defender	1923–1936	366	19
Paolo Rossi	Italy	Forward	1973–1975; 1981–1985	138	44
**Daniele Rugani**	Italy	Defender	2015–present	157	11
Giovanni Sacco	Italy	Midfielder	1962–1969	116	3
Sandro Salvadore	Italy	Defender	1962–1974	450	17
Alex Sandro	Brazil	Defender	2015–2024	327	16
Benito Sarti	Italy	Defender	1958–1968	263	1
Salvatore Schillaci	Italy	Forward	1989–1992	132	36
Gaetano Scirea	Italy	Defender	1974–1988	552	32
Lucidio Sentimenti IVº	Italy	Goalkeeper	1942–1949	188	5 (Note: Sentimenti IVº scored 5 goals in 188 matches with Juventus, 4 of these as striker during the 1944 Campionato Alta Italia. See "Statistic Area – All Juventus FC players: Lucidio Sentimenti IVº". Juworld.net (in Italian).)
Vittorio Sentimenti IIIº	Italy	Forward	1942–1949	218	69
Mohamed Sissoko	Mali/France	Midfielder	2008–2011	100	3
Omar Sívori	Argentina/Italy	Forward	1957–1965	259	174
Luciano Spinosi	Italy	Defender	1970–1978	241	4
Gino Stacchini	Italy	Forward	1955–1967	279	56
Wojciech Szczęsny	Poland	Goalkeeper	2017–2024	252	0
Alessio Tacchinardi	Italy	Midfielder	1994–2005	404	15
Stefano Tacconi	Italy	Goalkeeper	1983–1992	382	0
Marco Tardelli	Italy	Midfielder	1975–1985	377	52
Lilian Thuram	France	Defender	2001–2006	204	1
Moreno Torricelli	Italy	Defender	1992–1998	230	3
David Trezeguet	France	Forward	2000–2010	320	171
Roberto Tricella	Italy	Defender	1987–1990	114	2
Igor Tudor	Croatia	Defender	1998–2007	174	21
Giovanni Varglien IIº	Italy	Midfielder	1929–1947	410	42
Mario Varglien Iº	Italy	Midfielder	1928–1942	402	17
Gianluca Vialli	Italy	Forward	1992–1996	145	53
Arturo Vidal	Chile	Midfielder	2011–2015	171	48
Beniamino Vignola	Italy	Midfielder	1983–1985; 1986–1988	128	18
Giovanni Viola	Italy	Goalkeeper	1945–1958	246	0
Pietro Paolo Virdis	Italy	Forward	1977–1980; 1981–1982	110	29
Dušan Vlahović	Serbia	Forward	2022–2026	168	68
**Kenan Yıldız**	Turkey	Forward	2023–present	131	27
Marcelo Zalayeta	Uruguay	Forward	2001–2007	160	34
Gianluca Zambrotta	Italy	Defender	1999–2006	297	10
Jonathan Zebina	France	Defender	2004–2010	117	1
Zinedine Zidane	France	Midfielder	1996–2001	212	31
Gianfranco Zigoni	Italy	Forward	1961–1970	125	36
Dino Zoff	Italy	Goalkeeper	1972–1983	476	0

== Club captains ==
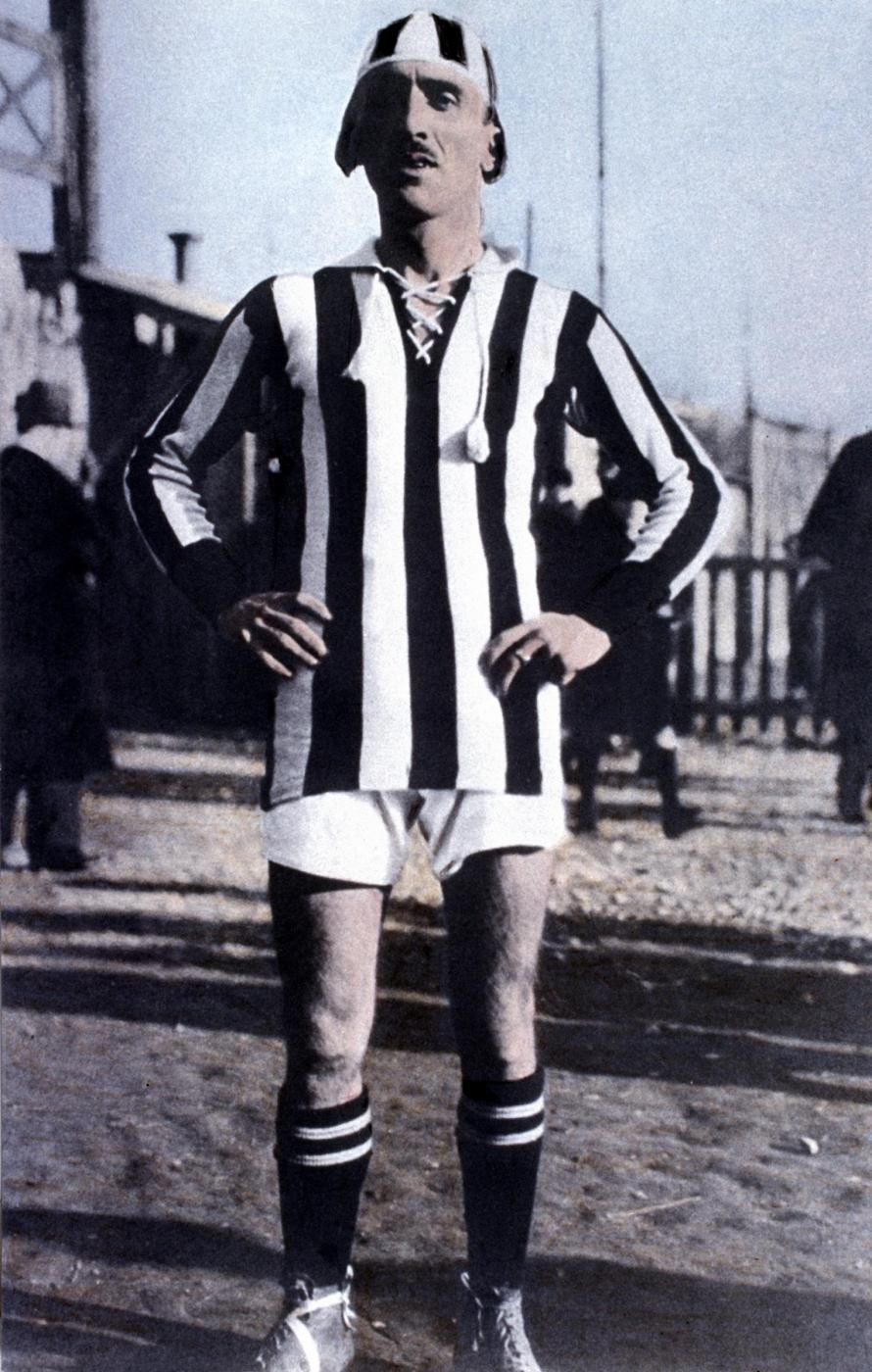
Carlo Bigatto Iº, the first Juventus captain ever and winner of the Italian Serie A as footballer and manager with Juventus

The role of captain in Italian football made its first appearance in the early 1920s.

Player	Position	Dates
(Italy) Carlo Bigatto Iº	Midfielder	1922–1929
(Italy) Virginio Rosetta	Defender	1929–1935
(Argentina) (Italy) Luis Monti	Midfielder	1935–1938
(Italy) Mario Varglien Iº	Midfielder	1938–1942
(Italy) Pietro Rava	Defender	1942–1949
(Italy) Carlo Parola	Defender	1949–1954
(Italy) Giampiero Boniperti	Forward	1954–1961
(Italy) Flavio Emoli	Midfielder	1961–1963
(Argentina) (Italy) Omar Sívori	Forward	1963–1965
(Italy) Ernesto Càstano	Defender	1965–1970
(Italy) Sandro Salvadore	Defender	1970–1974
(Italy) Pietro Anastasi	Forward	1974–1976
(Italy) Giuseppe Furino	Midfielder	1976–1984
(Italy) Gaetano Scirea	Defender	1984–1988
(Italy) Antonio Cabrini	Defender	1988–1989
(Italy) Sergio Brio	Defender	1989–1990
(Italy) Stefano Tacconi	Goalkeeper	1990–1992
(Italy) Roberto Baggio	Forward	1992–1995
(Italy) Gianluca Vialli	Forward	1995–1996
(Italy) Antonio Conte	Midfielder	1996–2001
(Italy) Alessandro Del Piero	Forward	2001–2012
(Italy) Gianluigi Buffon	Goalkeeper	2012–2018
(Italy) Giorgio Chiellini	Defender	2018–2022
(Italy) Leonardo Bonucci	Defender	2022–2023
(Brazil) Danilo	Defender	2023–2025
(Italy) Manuel Locatelli	Midfielder	2025–present

=== List of Juventus players to have won all three major UEFA club competitions ===
The table below shows the Juventus players who have won all three major UEFA club competitions (chronological order). (Note: The UEFA Intertoto Cup, a competition per clubs recognised by the main football organisation in Europe from 1995 to 2008, is not included in this list.)

Player	European Cup	European Cup Winners' Cup	UEFA Cup
(Italy) Gaetano Scirea	1984–85	1983–84	1976–77
(Italy) Antonio Cabrini	1984–85	1983–84	1976–77
(Italy) Marco Tardelli	1984–85	1983–84	1976–77
(Italy) Stefano Tacconi	1984–85	1983–84	1989–90
(Italy) Sergio Brio	1984–85	1983–84	1989–90

Source: Players regarding European Club Cups, Record Sport Soccer Statistics Foundation, rsssf.com. The Inter-Cities Fairs Cup (1958–1971) is not included in this list because is not recognised as official European competition by UEFA. See:
- "UEFA club competitions press kit (.PDF archive, page 23)" (PDF). UEFA Official Website.
- "History of the UEFA Cup". UEFA Official Website.

=== List of Juventus' players to have won all UEFA club competitions ===
The table below show the Juventus players who have won all UEFA club competitions (chronological order).

Player	European Cup	European Cup Winners' Cup	UEFA Cup	European Super Cup	Intercontinental Cup
(Italy) Gaetano Scirea	1984–85	1983–84	1976–77	1984	1985
(Italy) Antonio Cabrini	1984–85	1983–84	1976–77	1984	1985
(Italy) Stefano Tacconi	1984–85	1983–84	1989–90	1984	1985
(Italy) Sergio Brio	1984–85	1983–84	1989–90	1984	1985

Source: Players regarding European Club Cups, Record Sport Soccer Statistics Foundation, rsssf.com. The Inter-Cities Fairs Cup (1958–1971) is not included in this list because is not recognised as official European competition by UEFA. See:
- "UEFA club competitions press kit (.PDF archive, page 23)" (PDF). UEFA Official Website.
- "History of the UEFA Cup". UEFA Official Website.

== See also ==
- Football records and statistics in Italy

== Bibliography ==
- Barbero, Sergio (2001). I miti della Juventus: 50 campioni che hanno fatto sognare il popolo bianconero (in Italian). Graphot Editrice. ISBN 88-86906-51-X.
- Gandolfi, G. (1975). I trenta grandi della Juventus (in Italian). MEB.
- Giacone, Gianni (1993). Juve Azzurri - I bianconeri che hanno fatto grande la Nazionale (in Italian). Hurrà Juventus – Fabbri Editori.
- Hurrà Juventus Redaction (1997). 100 campioni x 100 anni (in Italian). Hurrà Juventus – Rosabella Editore.
