= Juventus FC Hall of Fame =

- Sport: Association football
- Awarded for: Men's and women's Juventus first teams that have made history at the club
- Local name: Juventus Hall of Fame (Italian)
- Country: Italy
- Presented by: Juventus FC

History
- First award: 2025
- Editions: 1
- First winner: 50 players
- Website: Official website

In 2025, the Turin-based Juventus football club established a hall of fame. In its first edition, 50 Juventus players were inducted.

== History and regulations ==
The Juventus Hall of Fame was launched in September 2025 as a permanent room inside the J-Museum to honour and showcase the accomplishments of individuals who have left a lasting mark on Juventus' history. At its inception, 50 names were inducted, while subsequent individuals would be added through fan voting. To be inducted, a player must meet at least one of the following requirements:

- Have made at least 350 appearances with Juventus.
- Have won at least 15 trophies with the club.
- Have been a historic captain, meaning with at least 70 matches wearing the armband.
- Have scored at least 100 goals.
- Have won the Ballon d'Or while playing for Juventus.

== List of Hall of Fame players ==
Positions key
GK	Goalkeeper
DF	Defender
MF	Midfielder
FW	Forward

=== Men's team ===
Year	Player	Pos.	Juventus career	Apps.	Goals	Honours with Juventus	Reference
2025	(Italy) Pietro Anastasi	FW	1968–1976	307	132	1971–72 Serie A, 1972–73 Serie A, 1974–75 Serie A	
2025	(Italy) Roberto Baggio	FW	1990–1995	200	115	1992–93 UEFA Cup, 1994–95 Coppa Italia, 1994–95 Serie A	
2025	(Italy) Andrea Barzagli	DF	2011–2019	281	2	2011–12 Serie A, 2012 Supercoppa Italiana, 2012–13 Serie A, 2013 Supercoppa Italiana, 2013–14 Serie A, 2014–15 Coppa Italia, 2014–15 Serie A, 2015 Supercoppa Italiana, 2015–16 Coppa Italia, 2015–16 Serie A, 2016–17 Coppa Italia, 2016–17 Serie A, 2017–18 Coppa Italia, 2017–18 Serie A, 2018 Supercoppa Italiana, 2018–19 Serie A	
2025	(Italy) Roberto Bettega	FW	1969–1983	481	178	1971–72 Serie A, 1972–73 Serie A, 1974–75 Serie A, 1976–77 UEFA Cup, 1976–77 Serie A, 1977–78 Serie A, 1978–79 Coppa Italia, 1980–81 Serie A, 1981–82 Serie A	
2025	(Italy) Carlo Bigatto	MF	1913–1926	232	1	1925–26 Prima Divisione, 1930–31 Serie A	
2025	(Italy) Giampiero Boniperti	FW	1946–1961	458	179	1949–50 Serie A, 1951–52 Serie A, 1957–58 Serie A, 1958–59 Coppa Italia, 1959–60 Coppa Italia, 1959–60 Serie A, 1960–61 Serie A	
2025	(Italy) Leonardo Bonucci	DF	2010–2017; 2018–2023	502	37	2011–12 Serie A, 2012 Supercoppa Italiana, 2012–13 Serie A, 2013 Supercoppa Italiana, 2013–14 Serie A, 2014–15 Coppa Italia, 2014–15 Serie A, 2015 Supercoppa Italiana, 2015–16 Coppa Italia, 2015–16 Serie A, 2016–17 Coppa Italia, 2016–17 Serie A, 2017–18 Coppa Italia, 2017–18 Serie A, 2018 Supercoppa Italiana, 2018–19 Serie A, 2019–20 Serie A, 2020 Supercoppa Italiana, 2020–21 Coppa Italia	
2025	(Italy) Felice Borel	FW	1932–1941; 1942–1946	308	158	1932–33 Serie A, 1933–34 Serie A, 1934–35 Serie A, 1937–38 Coppa Italia	
2025	(Italy) Sergio Brio	DF	1974–1990	385	24	1978–79 Coppa Italia, 1980–81 Serie A, 1981–82 Serie A, 1982–83 Coppa Italia, 1983–84 Serie A, 1983–84 European Cup Winners' Cup, 1984–85 European Cup, 1984 European Super Cup, 1985 Intercontinental Cup, 1985–86 Serie A, 1989–90 Coppa Italia, 1989–90 UEFA Cup	
2025	(Italy) Gianluigi Buffon	GK	2001–2018; 2019–2021	685	0	2001–02 Serie A, 2002 Supercoppa Italiana, 2002–03 Serie A, 2003 Supercoppa Italiana, 2011–12 Serie A, 2012 Supercoppa Italiana, 2012–13 Serie A, 2013 Supercoppa Italiana, 2013–14 Serie A, 2014–15 Coppa Italia, 2014–15 Serie A, 2015 Supercoppa Italiana, 2015–16 Coppa Italia, 2015–16 Serie A, 2016–17 Coppa Italia, 2016–17 Serie A, 2017–18 Coppa Italia, 2017–18 Serie A, 2018 Supercoppa Italiana, 2018–19 Serie A, 2019–20 Serie A, 2020 Supercoppa Italiana, 2020–21 Coppa Italia	
2025	(Italy) Antonio Cabrini	DF	1976–1989	442	52	1976–77 Serie A, 1976–77 UEFA Cup, 1977–78 Serie A, 1978–79 Coppa Italia, 1980–81 Serie A, 1981–82 Serie A, 1982–83 Coppa Italia, 1983–84 Serie A, 1983–84 European Cup Winners' Cup, 1984–85 European Cup, 1984 European Super Cup, 1985 Intercontinental Cup, 1985–86 Serie A	
2025	(Italy) Fabio Cannavaro	DF	2004–2006; 2009–2010	128	7	—	
2025	(Italy) Ernesto Castano	DF	1958–1970	128	7	1958–59 Coppa Italia, 1959–60 Coppa Italia, 1959–60 Serie A, 1960–61 Serie A, 1964–65 Coppa Italia, 1966–67 Serie A	
2025	(Italy) Franco Causio	MF	1966–1968; 1970–1981	452	72	1971–72 Serie A, 1972–73 Serie A, 1974–75 Serie A, 1976–77 Serie A, 1976–77 UEFA Cup, 1977–78 Serie A, 1978–79 Coppa Italia, 1980–81 Serie A	
2025	(Wales) John Charles	FW	1957–1962	179	105	1957–58 Serie A, 1958–59 Coppa Italia, 1959–60 Coppa Italia, 1959–60 Serie A, 1960–61 Serie A	
2025	(Italy) Giorgio Chiellini	DF	2004–2022	561	36	2011–12 Serie A, 2012 Supercoppa Italiana, 2012–13 Serie A, 2013 Supercoppa Italiana, 2013–14 Serie A, 2014–15 Coppa Italia, 2014–15 Serie A, 2015 Supercoppa Italiana, 2015–16 Coppa Italia, 2015–16 Serie A, 2016–17 Coppa Italia, 2016–17 Serie A, 2017–18 Coppa Italia, 2017–18 Serie A, 2018 Supercoppa Italiana, 2018–19 Serie A, 2019–20 Serie A, 2020 Supercoppa Italiana, 2020–21 Coppa Italia	
2025	(Italy) Gianpiero Combi	GK	1921–1934	370	0	1925–26 Prima Divisione, 1930–31 Serie A, 1931–32 Serie A, 1932–33 Serie A, 1933–34 Serie A	
2025	(Italy) Antonio Conte	MF	1991–2004	420	44	1992–93 UEFA Cup, 1994–95 Coppa Italia, 1994–95 Serie A, 1995 Supercoppa Italiana, 1995–96 UEFA Champions League, 1996–97 Serie A, 1997 Supercoppa Italiana, 1997–98 Serie A, 1999 UEFA Intertoto Cup, 2001–02 Serie A, 2002–03 Serie A, 2003 Supercoppa Italiana	
2025	(Italy) Antonello Cuccureddu	DF	1969–1981	438	39	1971–72 Serie A, 1972–73 Serie A, 1974–75 Serie A, 1976–77 Serie A, 1976–77 UEFA Cup, 1977–78 Serie A, 1978–79 Coppa Italia, 1980–81 Serie A	
2025	(Italy) Alessandro Del Piero	FW	1993–2012	705	290	1994–95 Coppa Italia, 1994–95 Serie A, 1995 Supercoppa Italiana, 1995–96 UEFA Champions League, 1996 UEFA Super Cup, 1996 Intercontinental Cup, 1996–97 Serie A, 1997 Supercoppa Italiana, 1997–98 Serie A, 1999 UEFA Intertoto Cup, 2001–02 Serie A, 2002 Supercoppa Italiana, 2002–03 Serie A, 2003 Supercoppa Italiana, 2011–12 Serie A	
2025	(Italy) Teobaldo Depetrini	MF	1933–1949	359	10	1933–34 Serie A, 1934–35 Serie A	
2025	(Italy) Ciro Ferrara	DF	1994–2005	358	20	1994–95 Coppa Italia, 1994–95 Serie A, 1995 Supercoppa Italiana, 1995–96 UEFA Champions League, 1996 UEFA Super Cup, 1996 Intercontinental Cup, 1996–97 Serie A, 1997 Supercoppa Italiana, 1997–98 Serie A, 1999 UEFA Intertoto Cup, 2001–02 Serie A, 2002 Supercoppa Italiana, 2002–03 Serie A, 2003 Supercoppa Italiana	
2025	(Italy) Giuseppe Furino	MF	1969–1984	534	19	1971–72 Serie A, 1972–73 Serie A, 1974–75 Serie A, 1976–77 Serie A, 1976–77 UEFA Cup, 1977–78 Serie A, 1978–79 Coppa Italia, 1980–81 Serie A, 1981–82 Serie A, 1982–83 Coppa Italia, 1983–84 Serie A, 1983–84 European Cup Winners' Cup	
2025	(Italy) Guglielmo Gabetto	FW	1934–1941	191	102	1934–35 Serie A, 1937–38 Coppa Italia	
2025	(Italy) Claudio Gentile	DF	1973–1984	417	10	1974–75 Serie A, 1976–77 Serie A, 1976–77 UEFA Cup, 1977–78 Serie A, 1978–79 Coppa Italia, 1980–81 Serie A, 1981–82 Serie A, 1982–83 Coppa Italia, 1983–84 Serie A, 1983–84 European Cup Winners' Cup	
2025	(Denmark) John Hansen	FW	1948–1954	189	124	1949–50 Serie A, 1951–52 Serie A	
2025	(Italy) Gianfranco Leoncini	MF	1958–1970	382	26	1958–59 Coppa Italia, 1959–60 Coppa Italia, 1959–60 Serie A, 1960–61 Serie A, 1964–65 Coppa Italia, 1966–67 Serie A	
2025	(Italy) Claudio Marchisio	MF	2005–2018	389	37	2011–12 Serie A, 2012 Supercoppa Italiana, 2012–13 Serie A, 2013 Supercoppa Italiana, 2013–14 Serie A, 2014–15 Coppa Italia, 2014–15 Serie A, 2015 Supercoppa Italiana, 2015–16 Coppa Italia, 2015–16 Serie A, 2016–17 Coppa Italia, 2016–17 Serie A, 2017–18 Coppa Italia, 2017–18 Serie A	
2025	(Italy) Francesco Morini	DF	1969–1980	377	0	1971–72 Serie A, 1972–73 Serie A, 1974–75 Serie A, 1976–77 Serie A, 1976–77 UEFA Cup, 1977–78 Serie A, 1978–79 Coppa Italia	
2025	(Italy) Federico Munerati	MF/FW	1922–1933	255	118	1925–26 Prima Divisione, 1930–31 Serie A, 1931–32 Serie A, 1932–33 Serie A	
2025	(Czech Republic) Pavel Nedvěd	MF	2001–2009	327	65	2001–02 Serie A, 2002 Supercoppa Italiana, 2002–03 Serie A, 2003 Supercoppa Italiana	
2025	(Italy) Carlo Parola	DF	1939–1954	339	11	1941–42 Coppa Italia, 1949–50 Serie A, 1951–52 Serie A	
2025	(Italy) Gianluca Pessotto	DF	1995–2006	366	3	1995 Supercoppa Italiana, 1995–96 UEFA Champions League, 1996 UEFA Super Cup, 1996 Intercontinental Cup, 1996–97 Serie A, 1997 Supercoppa Italiana, 1997–98 Serie A, 1999 UEFA Intertoto Cup, 2001–02 Serie A, 2002 Supercoppa Italiana, 2002–03 Serie A, 2003 Supercoppa Italiana	
2025	(France) Michel Platini	FW	1982–1987	224	104	1983–84 Serie A, 1985–86 Serie A, 1982–83 Coppa Italia, 1983–84 European Cup Winners' Cup, 1984 European Super Cup, 1984–85 European Cup, 1985 Intercontinental Cup	
2025	(Italy) Pietro Rava	DF	1935–1943; 1944; 1946–1947	330	15	1937–38 Coppa Italia, 1941–42 Coppa Italia, 1949–50 Serie A	
2025	(Italy) Virginio Rosetta	DF	1923–1936	366	19	1925–26 Prima Divisione, 1930–31 Prima Divisione, 1931–32 Prima Divisione, 1932–33 Prima Divisione, 1933–34 Prima Divisione, 1934–35 Prima Divisione	
2025	(Italy) Paolo Rossi	FW	1981–1985	135	44	1982–83 Coppa Italia, 1981–82 Serie A, 1983–84 Serie A, 1983–84 European Cup Winners' Cup, 1984 European Super Cup, 1984–85 European Cup	
2025	(Italy) Sandro Salvadore	DF	1962–1974	460	17	1964–65 Coppa Italia, 1966–67 Serie A, 1971–72 Serie A, 1972–73 Serie A	
2025	(Italy) Gaetano Scirea	DF	1974–1988	554	32	1974–75 Serie A, 1976–77 Serie A, 1976–77 UEFA Cup, 1977–78 Serie A, 1978–79 Coppa Italia, 1980–81 Serie A, 1981–82 Serie A, 1982–83 Coppa Italia, 1983–84 Serie A, 1983–84 European Cup Winners' Cup, 1984 European Super Cup, 1984–85 European Cup, 1985 Intercontinental Cup, 1985–86 Serie A	
2025	(Argentina) (Italy) Omar Sívori	FW	1957–1965	259	174	1957–58 Serie A, 1958–59 Coppa Italia, 1959–60 Coppa Italia, 1959–60 Serie A, 1960–61 Serie A, 1964–65 Coppa Italia	
2025	(Italy) Alessio Tacchinardi	MF	1994–2007	405	14	1994–95 Coppa Italia, 1994–95 Serie A, 1995 Supercoppa Italiana, 1995–96 UEFA Champions League, 1996 UEFA Super Cup, 1996 Intercontinental Cup, 1996–97 Serie A, 1997 Supercoppa Italiana, 1997–98 Serie A, 1999 UEFA Intertoto Cup, 2001–02 Serie A, 2002 Supercoppa Italiana, 2002–03 Serie A, 2003 Supercoppa Italiana	
2025	(Italy) Stefano Tacconi	GK	1983–1992	382	0	1983–84 Serie A, 1983–84 European Cup Winners' Cup, 1984 European Super Cup, 1984–85 European Cup, 1985 Intercontinental Cup, 1985–86 Serie A, 1989–90 Coppa Italia, 1989–90 UEFA Cup	
2025	(Italy) Marco Tardelli	MF	1975–1985	375	52	1976–77 Serie A, 1976–77 UEFA Cup, 1977–78 Serie A, 1978–79 Coppa Italia, 1980–81 Serie A, 1981–82 Serie A, 1982–83 Coppa Italia, 1983–84 Serie A, 1983–84 European Cup Winners' Cup, 1984 European Super Cup, 1984–85 European Cup	
2025	(France) David Trezeguet	FW	2000–2010	320	171	2001–02 Serie A, 2002–03 Serie A, 2003 Supercoppa Italiana	
2025	(Italy) Giovanni Varglien	MF	1929–1947	411	43	1930–31 Serie A, 1931–32 Serie A, 1932–33 Serie A, 1933–34 Serie A, 1934–35 Serie A, 1937–38 Coppa Italia, 1941–42 Coppa Italia	
2025	(Italy) Mario Varglien	MF	1927–1942	402	16	1930–31 Serie A, 1931–32 Serie A, 1932–33 Serie A, 1933–34 Serie A, 1934–35 Serie A, 1937–38 Coppa Italia, 1941–42 Coppa Italia	
2025	(Italy) Gianluca Vialli	FW	1992–1996	145	53	1992–93 UEFA Cup, 1994–95 Coppa Italia, 1994–95 Serie A, 1995 Supercoppa Italiana, 1995–96 UEFA Champions League	
2025	(France) Zinedine Zidane	MF	1996–2001	214	31	1996 UEFA Super Cup, 1996 Intercontinental Cup, 1996–97 Serie A, 1997–98 Serie A, 1997 Supercoppa Italiana, 1999 UEFA Intertoto Cup	
2025	(Italy) Dino Zoff	GK	1972–1983	479	0	1972–73 Serie A, 1974–75 Serie A, 1976–77 UEFA Cup, 1976–77 Serie A, 1977–78 Serie A, 1978–79 Coppa Italia, 1980–81 Serie A, 1981–82 Serie A, 1982–83 Coppa Italia	

=== Women's team ===
Year	Player	Pos.	Juventus career	Apps.	Goals	Honours with Juventus	Reference
2025	(Italy) Sara Gama	DF	2017–2025	154	6	2017–18 Serie A, 2018–19 Coppa Italia , 2018–19 Serie A, 2019 Supercoppa Italiana, 2019–20 Serie A, 2020–21 Supercoppa Italiana, 2020–21 Serie A, 2021–22 Supercoppa Italiana, 2021–22 Coppa Italia, 2021–22 Serie A, 2022–23 Coppa Italia, 2024–25 Coppa Italia, 2024–25 Serie A	

== See also ==
- List of Juventus FC players
