= Pietro Rava =

Italian footballer and manager

- Rava in 1935

Personal information
- Full name: Pietro Rava
- Date of birth: 21 January 1916
- Place of birth: Cassine, Alessandria, Kingdom of Italy
- Date of death: 5 November 2006 (aged 90)
- Place of death: Turin, Italy
- Height: 1.75 m (5 ft 9 in)
- Position: Left-back

Youth career
- 1934–1935: Juventus

Senior career*
Years	Team	Apps	(Gls)
1935–1946	Juventus	230	(11)
1944–1946	Alessandria	38	(5)
1947–1950	Juventus	73	(3)
1950–1952	Novara	25	(1)
Total		366	(20)

International career
1935–1946	Italy	30	(0)

Managerial career
- 1952: Padova
- 1953: Carrarese
- 1953–1954: Padova
- 1954–1955: Cuneo
- 1955–1956: Simmenthal-Monza
- 1956–1957: Sampdoria
- 1957: Palermo
- 1958–1959: Simmenthal-Monza
- 1961–1963: Alessandria
- 1963–1964: Biellese
Medal record
Italy
Summer Olympics
Gold medal – first place	1936 Berlin
FIFA World Cup
Gold medal – first place	1938 France
- * Club domestic league appearances and goals

Pietro Rava (Italian pronunciation: [ˈpjɛːtro ˈraːva]; 21 January 1916 – 5 November 2006) was an Italian football defender and coach, who played as a full-back. He won the 1936 Summer Olympics and the 1938 FIFA World Cup with the Italy national team.

== Club career ==
Rava, born in Cassine, Province of Alessandria, played for Juventus (1935–1946 and 1947–1950), Alessandria (1944–1946), and Novara (1950–1952). He won two Coppa Italia in the 1937–38 and 1941–42 seasons, and two scudetti in the 1934–35 and 1949–50 seasons. He was Juventus's captain from 1947 to 1950. In total, he played in 366 Serie A matches (including 303 for Juventus), scoring 20 goals.

== International career ==
Rava appeared in 30 international matches with the Italy national team between 1935 and 1946, losing only one game, and he was the captain of the Azzurri for two matches. He won the gold medal at the 1936 Summer Olympics and the 1938 FIFA World Cup. Rumour has it, before the 1938 finals, fascist Italian Prime Minister Benito Mussolini was to have sent a telegram to the team, saying "Vincere o morire!" (literally translated as "Win or die!"). However, no record remains of such a telegram, and Rava said, when interviewed, "No, no, no, that's not true. He sent a telegram wishing us well, but no, never 'win or die'." He was selected to the "Best XI" of the 1938 World Cup. Along with Alfredo Foni, Sergio Bertoni, and Ugo Locatelli, Rava is one of only four Italian players ever to win both the Olympic tournament and the World Cup.

== After retirement ==
As a coach, he managed Padova, Carrarese, Padova, Cuneo, Simmenthal-Monza, Sampdoria, Palermo, Alessandria, and Biellese.

On 5 November 2006, Rava, who was the last surviving member of the Italy 1938 World Cup champion squad, died in Turin after having had surgery on his right femur due to a fracture days before. He had been suffering from Alzheimer's disease for several years. Juventus announced that the following day, for a Serie B match against Napoli, the players would wear mourning armbands in his memory.

== Honours ==
=== Club ===
Juventus

- Serie A: 1949–50; Runner-up: 1937–38, 1946–47
- Serie A-B runner-up: 1945–46
- Coppa Italia: 1937–38, 1941–42

=== International ===
Italy

- Olympic Gold Medal: 1936
- FIFA World Cup: 1938

=== Individual ===
- 1938 FIFA World Cup All-star Team
- Juventus FC Hall of Fame: 2025

Sporting positions
Preceded by Mario Varglien Iº	Juventus F.C. captains 1942–1949	Succeeded by Carlo Parola
World Cup-winners status
Preceded by Mario Perazzolo	Oldest living player 3 August 2001 – 5 November 2006	Succeeded by Aníbal Paz
