= Carlo Bigatto =

Italian footballer and coach (1895-1942)

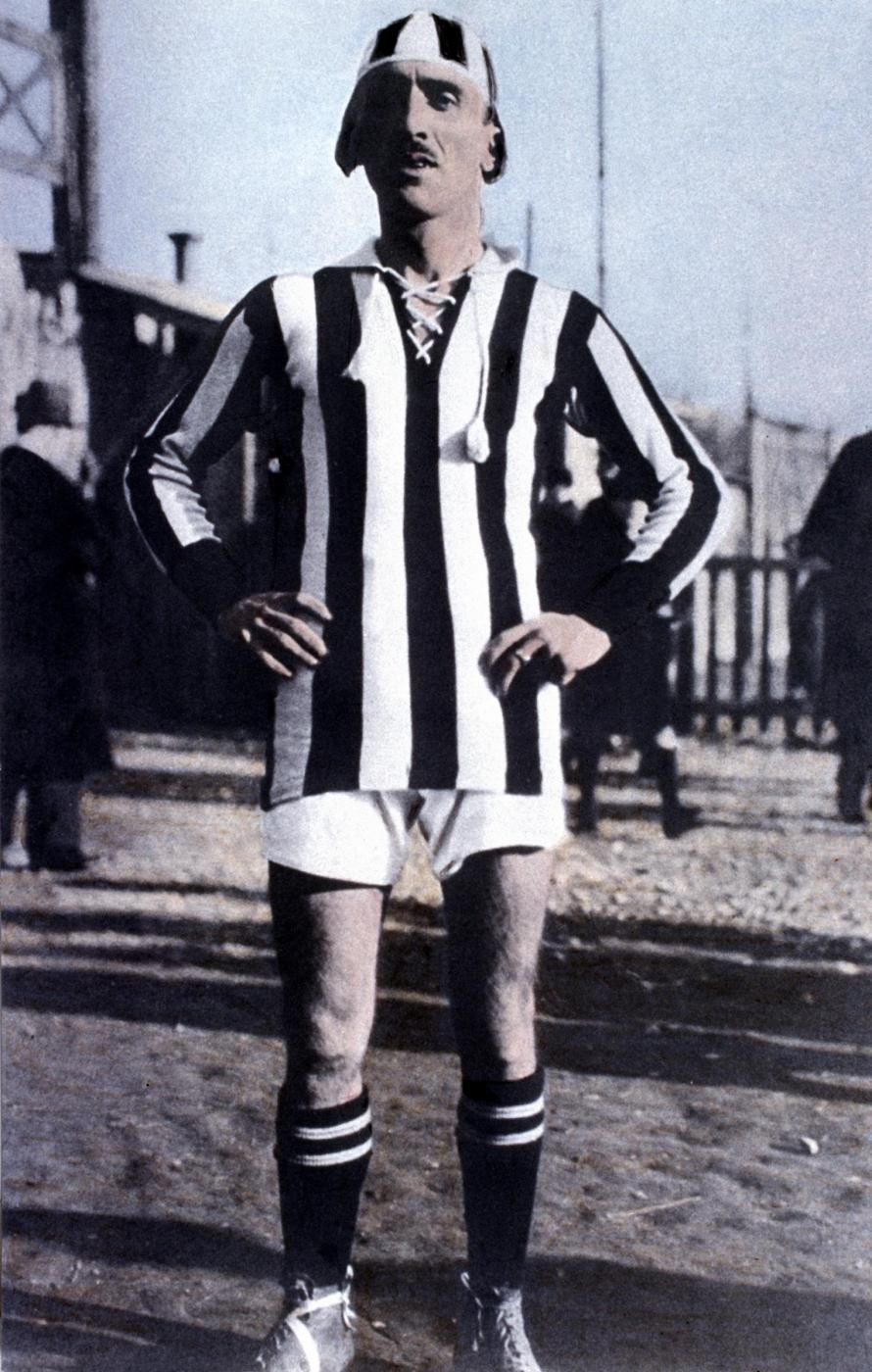
- Bigatto with Juventus

Personal information
- Full name: Carlo Bigatto
- Date of birth: 29 August 1895
- Place of birth: Balzola, Kingdom of Italy
- Date of death: 16 September 1942 (aged 47)
- Place of death: Turin, Kingdom of Italy
- Position: Left midfielder

Senior career*
Years	Team	Apps	(Gls)
1913–1931	Juventus	232	(1)

International career
1925–1927	Italy	5	(0)

Managerial career
- 1934–1935: Juventus
- * Club domestic league appearances and goals

Carlo Bigatto (Italian pronunciation: [ˈkarlo biˈɡatto]; 29 August 1895 – 16 September 1942) was an Italian football player and coach who played as a midfielder.

== Club career ==
Bigatto spent his entire club career playing football for Italian side Juventus, also serving as team captain, and winning two Serie A titles.

== International career ==
Bigatto also played for the Italy national football team five times between 1925 and 1927.

== Managerial career ==
After his retirement Bigatto returned to Juventus in a managerial role during the latter part of the 1934–35 season in which Juventus won the league over Inter by two points; before Virginio Rosetta took over the following year.

== Honours ==
=== Player ===
Juventus

- Serie A: 1925–26, 1930–31

Individual

- Juventus FC Hall of Fame: 2025

=== Manager ===
Juventus

- Serie A: 1934–35

== See also ==
- One-club man

Sporting positions
Preceded by 'new creation'	Juventus F.C. captains 1922–1929	Succeeded by Virginio Rosetta
