= Mario Varglien =

Italian footballer and manager

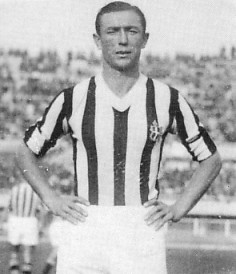

Personal information
- Full name: Mario Varglien
- Date of birth: 26 December 1905
- Place of birth: Fiume, Austria-Hungary
- Date of death: 11 August 1978 (aged 72)
- Place of death: Florence, Italy
- Height: 1.76 m (5 ft 9 in)
- Position: Defensive midfielder

Senior career*
Years	Team	Apps	(Gls)
1926–1927	Fiumana		
1927–1928	Pro Patria	20	(2)
1928–1942	Juventus	353	(17)
1942–1943	Sanremese		
1943–1944	Triestina	11	(0)

International career
1935	Italy	1	(0)

Managerial career
- 1946–1947: Triestina
- 1948–1951: Como
- 1951–1952: Pro Patria
- 1952–1954: Roma
Medal record
Italy
FIFA World Cup
Gold medal – first place	1934 Italy
- * Club domestic league appearances and goals

Mario Varglien (Italian pronunciation: [ˈmaːrjo ˈvarʎen]; 26 December 1905 – 11 August 1978), also known as Varglien I, was an Italian football player and manager born in Fiume (today Rijeka), who played as a defensive midfielder.

== Club career ==
Varglien played most of his club career with Juventus, winning five Serie A championships, and also serving as the team's captain.

== International career ==
At the international level, Varglien was also part of the Italy national football team that won the 1934 FIFA World Cup.

== Personal life ==
Mario's brother, Giovanni Varglien, also played football in Italy and with the Italy national team; the two brothers played together at Juventus.

== Honours ==
=== Player ===
Juventus

- Serie A: 1930–31, 1931–32, 1932–33, 1933–34, 1934–35
- Coppa Italia: 1937–38, 1941–42

Italy

- FIFA World Cup: 1934

==== Individual ====
- Juventus FC Hall of Fame: 2025

=== Coach ===
Como

- Serie B: 1948–49

Sporting positions
Preceded by Luis Monti	Juventus F.C. captains 1938–1942	Succeeded by Pietro Rava
