= Giovanni Moretti =

Giovanni Moretti is the name of:

- Giovanni Moretti (composer) (1807–1884), Italian composer, music pedagogue, and conductor
- Giovanni Moretti (footballer) (1909–1971), Italian footballer
- Giovanni Moretti (bishop) (1923–2018), Italian prelate of the Roman Catholic Church
