= Sernagiotto =

Sernagiotto is a surname. Notable people with the surname include:

- Giorgio Sernagiotto (born 1981), Italian racing driver
- Pedro Sernagiotto (1908–1965), Italian-Brazilian footballer
- Remo Sernagiotto (1955–2020), Italian politician
