= Luis Monti =

Argentine and Italian footballer

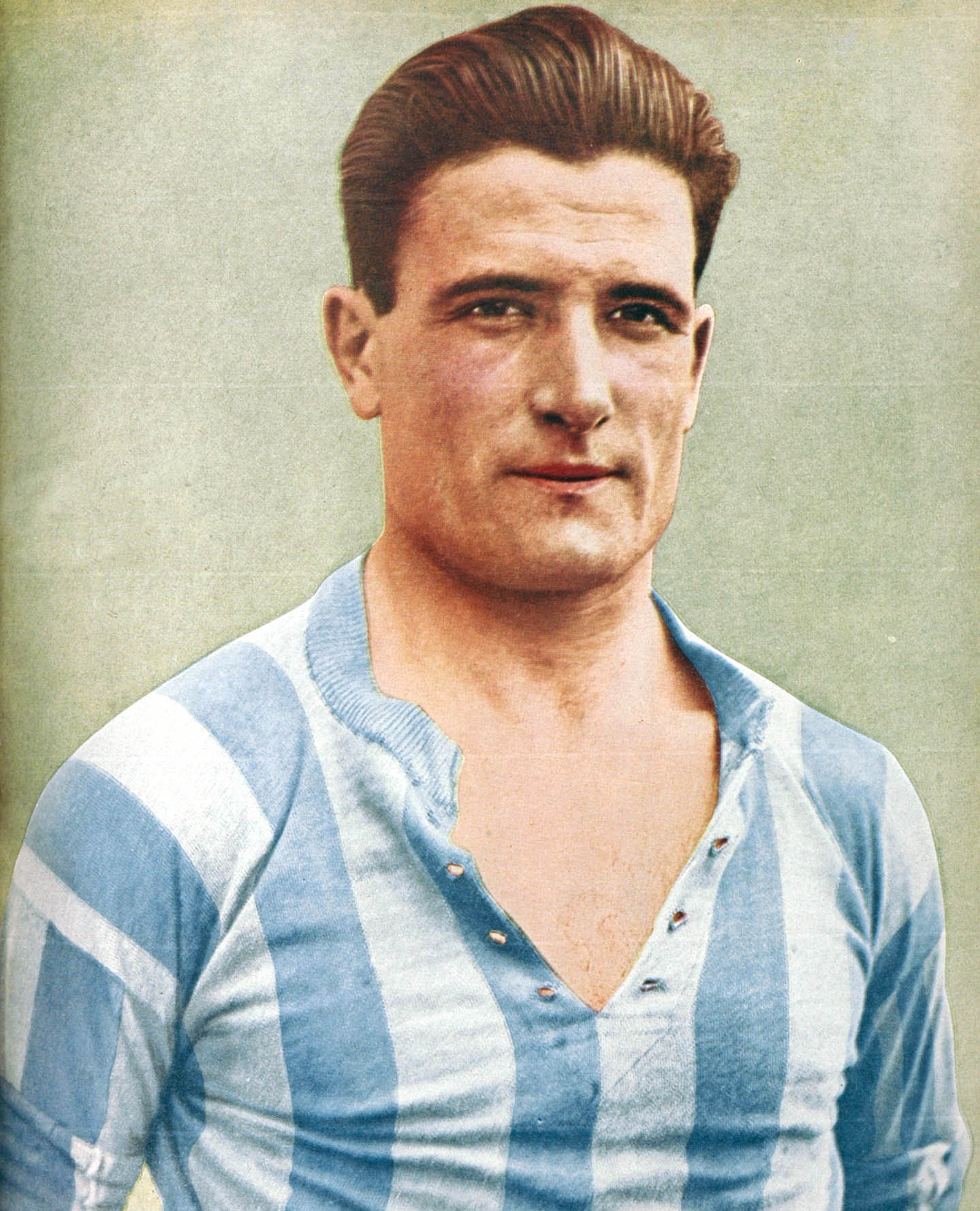
- Monti covered on El Gráfico, 1934.

Personal information
- Full name: Luis Felipe Monti
- Date of birth: 15 May 1901
- Place of birth: Buenos Aires, Argentina
- Date of death: 9 September 1983 (aged 82)
- Place of death: Escobar Partido, Argentina
- Position: Midfielder

Senior career*
Years	Team	Apps	(Gls)
1921	Huracán	4	(0)
1922	Boca Juniors	0	(0)
1922–1930	San Lorenzo	202	(40)
1930–1939	Juventus	225	(19)
Total		431	(59)

International career
1924–1931	Argentina	16	(5)
1932–1936	Italy	18	(1)

Managerial career
- 1939–1940: Triestina
- 1942: Juventus
- 1942–1943: Varese
- 1944: Varese
- 1945–1947: Atalanta
- 1947: Vigevano
- 1947–1948: Huracán
- 1949–1950: Pisa
Medal record
Men's football
Representing Argentina
Copa América
Winner	1927 Peru
FIFA World Cup
Runner-up	1930 Uruguay
Olympic Games
Silver medal – second place	1928 Amsterdam
Representing Italy
FIFA World Cup
Winner	1934 Italy
Central European International Cup
Winner	1933–35 Europe
- * Club domestic league appearances and goals

Luis Felipe Monti (15 May 1901 – 9 September 1983) was an Italian Argentine footballer who played as a midfielder and an Olympian. Monti has the distinction of having played in two FIFA World Cup final matches with two different national teams. He played the first of these finals with his native Argentina in 1930, which was lost to Uruguay; and the second with Italy as one of their Oriundi in 1934, thanks to his Romagnol descent. This second time, Monti was on the winning side in a 2–1 victory over Czechoslovakia.

Monti was a rugged, physical, and ruthless player, but he had the technical skills to go with his stamina and strong tackling. He played as an attacking centre half or metodista in the old-fashioned Metodo system: a position roughly equivalent to the defensive central midfield position of today. As such he would mark the opposing centre forward when his team were defending, but would be the main midfield playmaker when his team were on the attack, due to his passing and creativity, which enabled him to start attacking plays after winning back the ball. He was nicknamed doble ancho (double wide) due to his coverage of the pitch. Monti is considered one of the best centre-halves of his generation.

== Career ==
=== Argentina ===
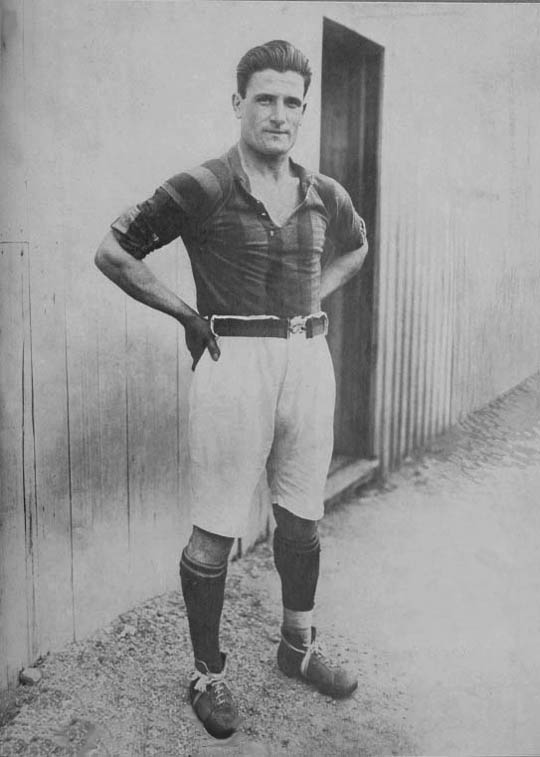
Monti in 1925 while playing at San Lorenzo.

Monti started his career in 1921 with Huracán, where he won the first of his many championships. The following year, he signed with Boca Juniors but left without playing a game. He joined San Lorenzo where he won a further three Argentine championships. All of Monti's honours in Argentina were recorded during the Amateur Era.

Monti was first called up to represent the Argentina national team in 1924. He won the 1927 South American Championship and the silver medal at the 1928 Summer Olympics. With Monti as a key player, Argentina cruised to the World Cup final in 1930, defeating France, Mexico, Chile, and the United States. Monti scored two goals along the way and injured opponents with his tackling. Some sources speculate that Monti was carrying an injury, but whatever the truth, and despite a death threat, he had a quiet game as Uruguay triumphed 4–2.

=== Italy ===
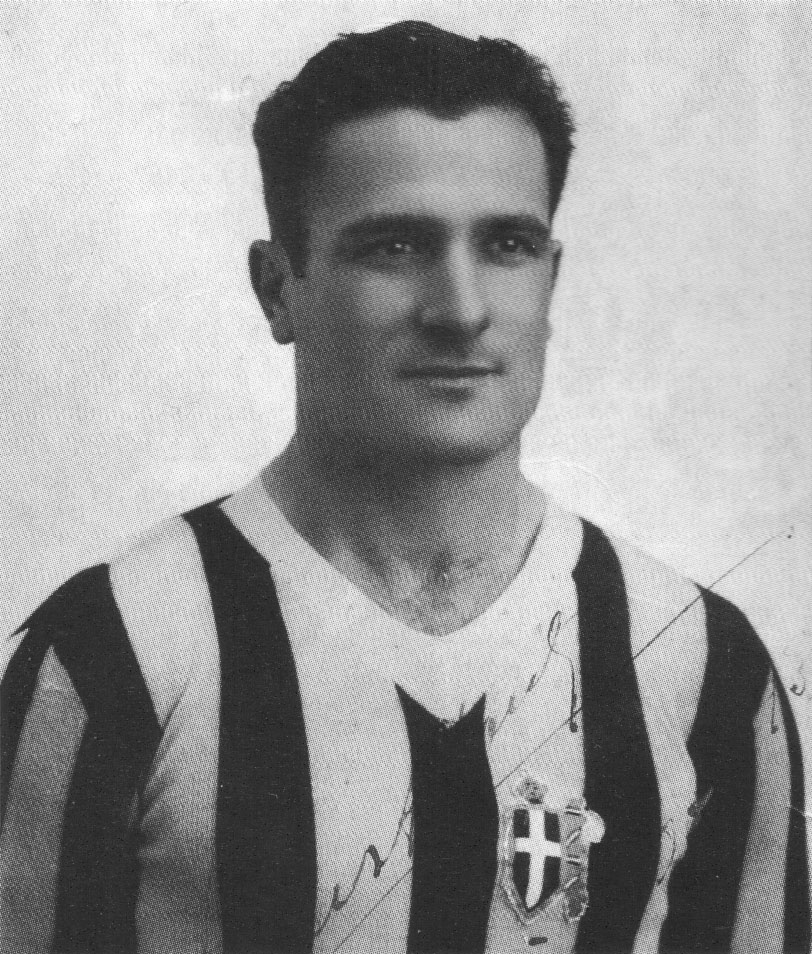
Monti in the early 1930s while playing at Juventus.

In 1930, Monti was signed by the Italian club Juventus, as he had Italian citizenship. As he was overweight and out of condition, he had a month's solitary training. Monti was back to top form, helping Juventus to four consecutive Serie A titles (1932 to 1935), also serving as the club's captain. Monti went on to play 225 matches and scored 19 goals in Italy. During the 1930s, he formed a formidable and successful defensive trio at the club, along with full-backs Virginio Rosetta and Umberto Caligaris, who played behind him.

He was also called up, within a year, to play for the Italy national team as an oriundo. Hosts Italy won their way to the 1934 World Cup final and defeated Czechoslovakia 2–1. And he was also a part of the successful squad that won the 1933–35 Central European International Cup.

=== The Battle of Highbury ===
The Battle of Highbury is a match that took place between Italy and England on 14 November 1934 at Highbury, the home ground of Arsenal. Monti was playing centre half for Italy, but as early as the second minute, he broke a bone in his foot after a clash with England centre forward Ted Drake. Down to 10 men, in the days before substitutes, Italy succumbed 2–3. Monti was only to play twice more for Italy.

In total, Monti won 16 caps (5 goals) for Argentina between 1924 and 1931, and 18 caps (1 goal) for Italy between 1932 and 1936.

== After football ==
Monti became a manager after retiring. In 1947, he managed the first team of Huracán. He died in 1983 aged 82.

== International goals ==
Argentina's goal tally first

#	Date	Venue	Opponent	Score	Result	Competition
1.	31 August 1924	Estadio Centenario, Montevideo, Uruguay	Uruguay	3–0	3–2	Friendly
2.	13 June 1928	Olympic Stadium, Amsterdam, Netherlands	Uruguay	1–1	1–2	1928 Summer Olympics
3.	15 July 1930	Estadio Centenario, Montevideo, Uruguay	France	1–0	1–0	1930 FIFA World Cup
4.	26 July 1930	Estadio Centenario, Montevideo, Uruguay	United States	1–0	6–1	1930 FIFA World Cup
5.	4 July 1931	Estadio Sportivo Barracas, Buenos Aires, Argentina	Paraguay	1–1	1–1	Copa Rosa Cheva

Italia's goal tally first

#	Date	Venue	Opponent	Score	Result	Competition
1.	3 December 1933	Stadio Artemio Franchi, Florence, Italy	Switzerland	5–2	5–2	1933–35 Central European International Cup

== Honours ==
=== Player ===
Club

Huracán

- Argentine Primera División (1): 1921

San Lorenzo

- Argentine Primera División (3): 1923, 1924, 1927

Juventus

- Serie A (4): 1931–32, 1932–33, 1933–34, 1934–35
- Coppa Italia (1): 1937–38

=== International ===
Argentina

- South American Football Championship: 1927
- Summer Olympics: Runner-up 1928
- FIFA World Cup: Runner-up 1930

Italy

- FIFA World Cup: 1934
- Central European International Cup: 1933–35

=== Individual ===
- FIFA World Cup All-Star Team (2): 1930, 1934

=== Manager ===
Club

Juventus

- Coppa Italia (1): 1941–42

Sporting positions
Preceded by Virginio Rosetta	Juventus F.C. captains 1935 –'38	Succeeded by Mario Varglien Iº
World Cup-winners status
Preceded by Santos Urdinarán	Oldest living player 14 July 1979 – 9 September 1983	Succeeded by Angelo Schiavio
