= Giovanni Varglien =

Italian footballer and manager (1911–1990)

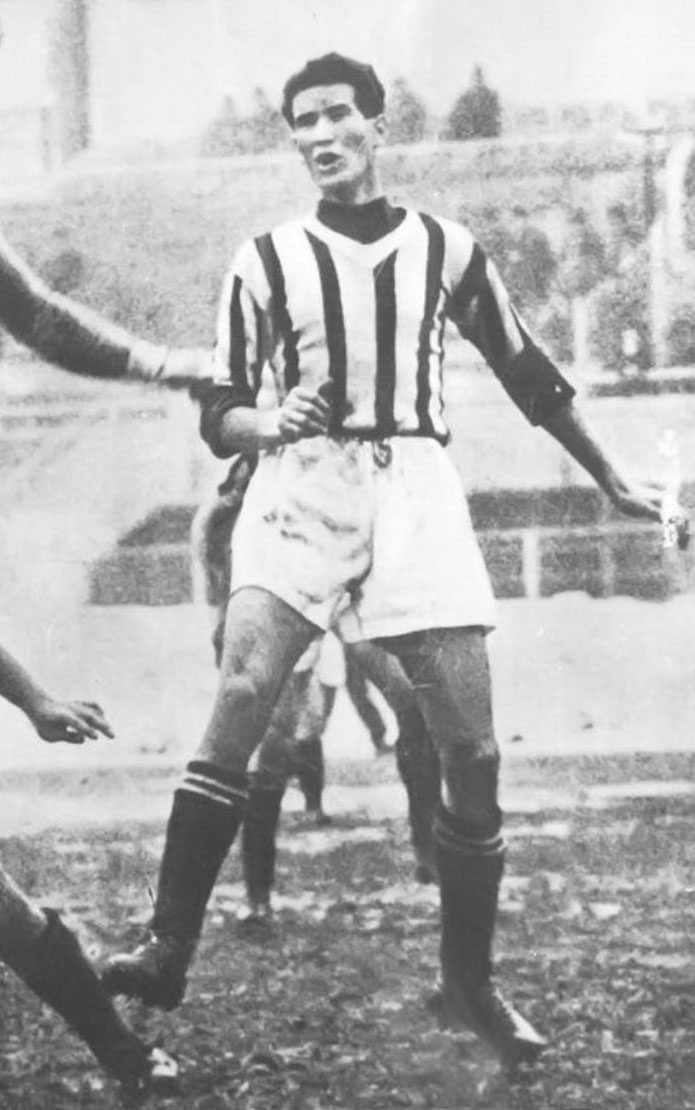
- Varglien II in action with Juventus in 1937

Personal information
- Date of birth: 16 May 1911
- Place of birth: Fiume, Austria-Hungary
- Date of death: 16 October 1990 (aged 79)
- Place of death: Trieste, Italy
- Height: 1.83 m (6 ft 0 in)
- Position: Midfielder

Senior career*
Years	Team	Apps	(Gls)
1928–1929	Fiumana	10	(0)
1929–1947	Juventus	381	(35)
1947–1948	Palermo	31	(2)
Total		422	(37)

International career
1936–1939	Italy	3	(0)

Managerial career
- 1948–1949: Palermo
- 1949–1951: Atalanta
- 1951–1953: Novara
- 1953: Palermo
- 1955–1956: Vefaspor
- 1956: Turkey
- 1956–1958: Vicenza Virtus
- 1958–1959: Salernitana
- 1959–1960: Pordenone
- 1960–1961: Salernitana
- 1961–1962: Casale
- 1962–1963: Biellese
- 1963–1964: Pordenone
- 1964–1966: Jesi
- * Club domestic league appearances and goals

Giovanni Varglien (Italian pronunciation: [dʒoˈvanni ˈvarʎen]; 16 May 1911 – 16 October 1990), also known as Varglien II, was an Italian football manager and player from Fiume who played as a midfielder.

== Club career ==
Varglien played the majority of his club football for Juventus in Italy, also playing one season with his hometown club Fiumana, as well as Palermo.

== International career ==
Varglien represented the Italy national football team on three occasions between 1936 and 1937.

== Personal life ==
Giovanni's older brother Mario Varglien, also played for Juventus at the same time and was a World Cup winner with Italy.

== Honours ==
Juventus

- Serie A: 1930–31, 1931–32, 1932–33, 1933–34, 1934–35
- Coppa Italia: 1937–38, 1941–42

Palermo

- Serie B: 1947–48

Individual

- Juventus FC Hall of Fame: 2025
