= Giovanni Ferrari =

Italian footballer

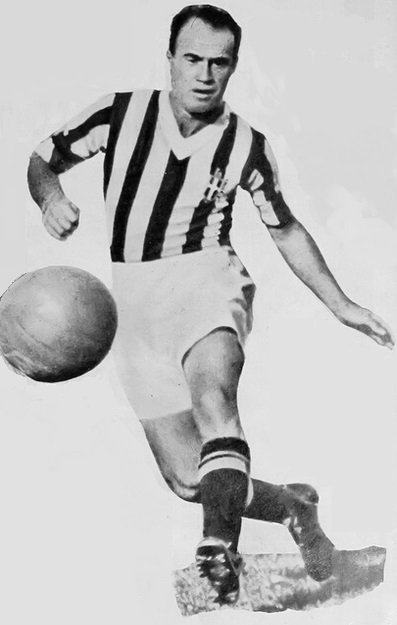
- Ferrari in 1933

Personal information
- Full name: Giovanni Vincenzo Ferrari
- Date of birth: 6 December 1907
- Place of birth: Alessandria, Kingdom of Italy
- Date of death: 2 December 1982 (aged 74)
- Place of death: Milan, Italy
- Height: 1.72 m (5 ft 7 1/2 in)
- Positions: Attacking midfielder; forward

Senior career*
Years	Team	Apps	(Gls)
1923–1925	US Alessandria	17	(2)
1925–1926	Napoli (loan)	15	(16)
1926–1930	US Alessandria	105	(60)
1930–1935	Juventus	160	(66)
1935–1940	Internazionale	108	(24)
1940–1941	Bologna	16	(2)
1941–1942	Juventus	6	(1)
Total		427	(171)

International career
1930–1938	Italy	44	(14)

Managerial career
- 1941–1942: Juventus
- 1942–1943: Internazionale
- 1945–1946: Brescia
- 1946–1948: Cantonal Neuchâtel
- 1948–1950: Prato
- 1951: Padova
- 1958–1959: Italy
- 1960–1962: Italy
Medal record
Men's Football
Representing Italy
FIFA World Cup
Winner	1934 Italy
Winner	1938 France
Central European International Cup
Runner-up	1931–32
Winner	1933–35
- * Club domestic league appearances and goals

Giovanni Ferrari (Italian pronunciation: [dʒoˈvanni ferˈraːri]; 6 December 1907 – 2 December 1982) was an Italian footballer who played as an attacking midfielder/inside forward on the left. He is regarded as one of the best players of his generation, having won Serie A 8 times, as well as two consecutive FIFA World Cup titles (in 1934 and 1938) with the Italy national football team. Along with Giuseppe Meazza and Eraldo Monzeglio, he is one of only three Italian players to have won two World Cups.

Ferrari played primarily as an attacking midfielder/left–sided inside forward, a role known in Italian football as the Mezzala. throughout his career.

== Club career ==
Ferrari began his footballing career with local club Alessandria in the prima divisione nazionale in 1923. He was at the start of the newly established Serie A in the season 1929-30, aside from a brief loan to Napoli during the 1925–26 season, where he scored 16 goals in 15 matches. He was given credit over a seven-year period (1923–1930) with Alessandria and Napoli in total to play in 137 matches and score 78 goals. The following year, Ferrari changed over to Juventus and was handed the number 10 shirt. Over that five-year period (1930–1935), which was his first spell at Juventus, he played in 160 games and scored 66 goals, in addition to providing many assists. Although the official number of assists he provided went unrecorded. Ferrari would next move to Inter, where he would play for five-years (1935-1940), and then subsequently to Bologna for the 1940–41 season, before return for second spell to Juventus in the 1941–42 season, this time as a player-manager in what turned out to be the final season of his playing career, winning his 10th major national trophy. After the Second World War, when Italian club football resumed in the season 1945-46, he became a full-time manager for Brescia.

1930-1935: Il Quinquennio d'Oro della Juventus

Juventus had won 2 Italian Championships earlier in history, before it was named Serie A, but under his guidance, the club won 5 consecutive Serie A Titles, Il Quinquennio d'Oro, by then a record of 1st 5 successive titles ever in Italy, cementing Juventus as one of the dominant clubs in Italian football.

1935-1941: Making it a record 8 Serie A titles

He then went on to win 2 more Serie A titles & 1 Coppa Italia with Internazionale and 1 Serie A title with Bologna; Making him the first player to win a then record of 8 Serie A Championships, Virginio Rosetta also won 8 national championships, but 3 of them came before the formation of a professional Serie A. Ferrari is also one of six footballers to have won the Serie A title with 3 clubs, a feat he managed with Juventus, Inter, and Bologna; the other 5 players to have managed the same feat are Filippo Cavalli, Aldo Serena, Pietro Fanna, Sergio Gori, and Attilio Lombardo. The record for most Serie A titles went unbroken for 77 years, until the season 2017–18 where Gianluigi Buffon won his 9th Serie A title, subsequently making it 10 Serie A titles in the season 2019-20, all 10 titles won with Juventus.

1941-1942: 2nd spell at Juventus & 10th major national trophy

He came back to Juventus, where he won his 2nd Coppa Italia, which was his 10th major national trophy in what would be his last season as a player. After this season, the Serie A & Coppa Italia were discontinued due to the Second World War.

== International career ==
Ferrari's first taste of success with the Italy national team was as part of the silver medal-winning 1931–32 Central European International Cup squad. He then went on to win two consecutive World Cups (in 1934 & 1938), as well as the 1933–35 Central European International Cup. All 4 tournaments alongside teammates Giuseppe Meazza and Eraldo Monzeglio. All three won four international titles together with Italy. In total, he managed 44 appearances and 14 goals with the national side between 1930 and 1938. He later was the head coach of Italy from 1960 to 1961, and was part of the technical commission, being co-manager with Paolo Mazza, leading Italy in the 1962 FIFA World Cup, where Italy lost a match to the hosting nation Chile in the Battle of Santiago, a match noted for its violent play.

=== 1931–32 Central European International Cup ===
Ferrari was a regular starter in his advanced playmaker/attacking midfielder role from the start of the 1931–32 Central European International Cup, and also scored a goal in the away match against Czechoslovakia. The campaign ended with Italy finishing as runners-up behind the Austrian Wunderteam led by Matthias Sindelar; this was Ferrari's first international medal with Italy (Silver).

=== 1934 FIFA World Cup ===
At the 1934 World Cup, Ferrari finished as the top assist provider of the tournament with four assists. In addition to his playmaking role, he scored twp goals, both of them in the knockout stage, in his first World Cup. The first goal was against USA in the round of 16 and the second goal equalizing against Spain in the quarter-finals, helping Italy avoid elimination and earning them a replay, as there were no penalty shoot-outs at the time (if a match was tied after extra time, there would be a rematch the day after; a win would mean they won the tie). They then defeated the Austrian Wunderteam in the semi-finals, and Czechoslovakia, led by Oldrich Nejedly, in the final.

=== 1933–35 Central European International Cup ===
Ferrari aside from his playmaker/attacking midfielder role scored three goals in Italy's gold medal-winning campaign in the 1933–25 Central European International Cup; he scored one at home against Czechoslovakia, home against Switzerland and home against Hungary, this time helping Italy beat the Austrian Wunderteam for the gold.

=== 1938 FIFA World Cup ===
Ferrari was once again a regular starter in his second World Cup, where, he once again helped guide Italy to its second consecutive World Cup title through his playmaking, beating Hungary led by György Sárosi in the final. This made him one of only three Italians to win two FIFA World Cup titles.

== Personal life ==
Ferrari was born in Alessandria on 6 December 1907 and died in Milan in 1982, aged 74.

== Honours ==
=== Club ===
Juventus

- Serie A: 1930–31, 1931–32, 1932–33, 1933–34, 1934–35
- Coppa Italia: 1941–42

Internazionale

- Serie A: 1937–38, 1939–40
- Coppa Italia: 1938–39

Bologna

- Serie A: 1940–41

=== International ===
Italy

- FIFA World Cup: 1934, 1938
- Central European International Cup: 1933–35; Runner-up: 1931–32

=== Individual ===
- Italian Football Hall of Fame: 2011 (Posthumous)
