= Teobaldo Depetrini =

Italian footballer and manager

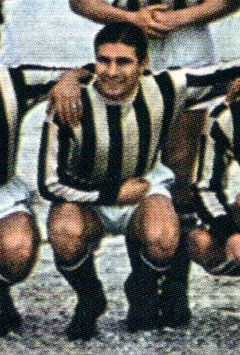
- Depetrini with Juventus in the 1940–41 season

Personal information
- Date of birth: 12 March 1914
- Place of birth: Vercelli, Kingdom of Italy
- Position: Midfielder

Senior career*
Years	Team	Apps	(Gls)
1930–33	Pro Vercelli	66	(1)
1933–49	Juventus	359	(9)
1949–51	Torino	30	(0)

International career
1936–1946	Italy	12	(0)

Managerial career
- 1957: Juventus
- 1958–1959: Juventus
- * Club domestic league appearances and goals

Teobaldo Depetrini (Italian pronunciation: [teoˈbaldo depeˈtriːni]; 12 March 1914 – 8 January 1996) was an Italian football player and coach from Vercelli in the Province of Vercelli. He played club football as a midfielder for his hometown side Pro Vercelli, Juventus and Torino.

Depetrini returned to Juventus in a managerial role during part of the 1959 season, however this return was very brief and he was replaced by Renato Cesarini.

== Honours ==
Juventus

- Serie A: 1933–34, 1934–35

Individual

- Juventus FC Hall of Fame: 2025
