= Cesare Valinasso =

Italian footballer (1909-1990)

Personal information
- Date of birth: November 27, 1909
- Place of birth: Turin, Italy
- Date of death: April 4, 1990 (aged 80)
- Place of death: Turin, Italy
- Height: 1.78 m (5 ft 10 in)
- Position: Goalkeeper

Senior career*
Years	Team	Apps	(Gls)
1927–1928	Juventus	0	(0)
1928–1929	Reggina	6	(0)
1929–1936	Juventus	65	(0)
1931–1933	→ Biellese (loan)	49	(0)
1936–1938	Roma	13	(0)
1938–1938	Venezia	23	(0)
1939–1941	Santhià		
1941–1942	Biellese	9	(0)
1945–1946	Volpiano		
- * Club domestic league appearances and goals

Cesare Valinasso (November 27, 1909 in Turin – April 4, 1990 in Turin) was an Italian professional football player.

== Honours ==
- Serie A champion: 1933/34, 1934/35.
