= Marcello Mihalich =

Italian footballer and manager

Personal information
- Date of birth: 12 March 1907
- Place of birth: Fiume, Austria-Hungary
- Date of death: 27 October 1996 (aged 89)
- Place of death: Turin, Italy
- Height: 1.74 m (5 ft 8 1/2 in)
- Position: Midfielder

Senior career*
Years	Team	Apps	(Gls)
1923–1926	Olympia Fiume	35	(13)
1926–1929	Fiumana	61	(33)
1929–1932	Napoli	94	(36)
1932–1933	Ambrosiana-Inter	11	(7)
1933–1934	Juventus	6	(0)
1934–1935	Pistoiese	29	(11)
1935–1938	Catania	67	(20)
1938–1939	Fiumana	19	(4)

International career
1929	Italy	1	(2)

Managerial career
- 1938–1940: Fiumana
- * Club domestic league appearances and goals

Marcello Mihalich (Italian pronunciation: [marˈtʃɛllo miˈaːlitʃ]; Croatian: Marcelo Mihalić, pronounced [martsělo mǐxalitɕ]; 12 March 1907 – 27 October 1996) was an Italian professional football player and coach who played as a midfielder.

== Honours ==
Juventus

- Serie A champion: 1933–34.
