= Umberto Caligaris =

Italian footballer (1901–1940)

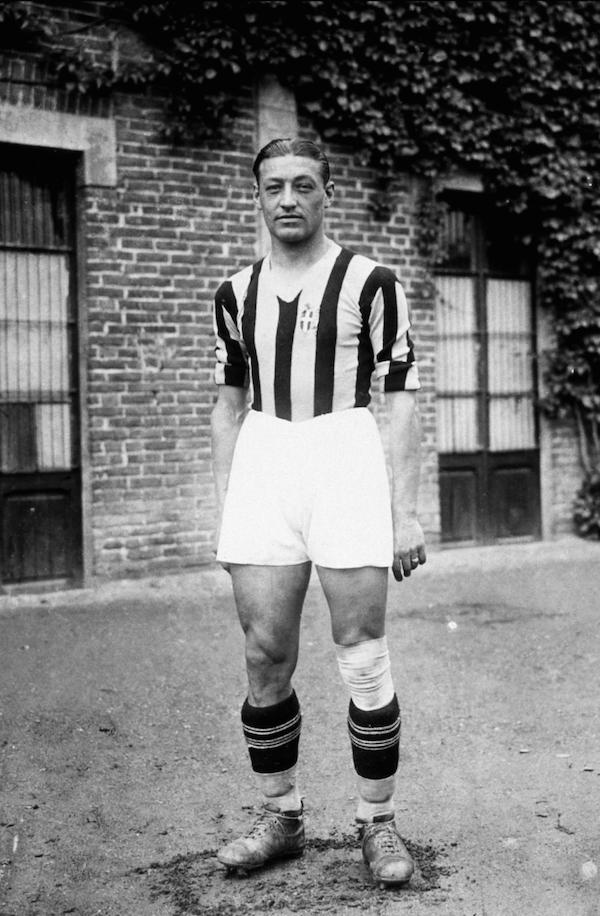
- Caligaris with Juventus in the 1930s

Personal information
- Date of birth: 26 July 1901
- Place of birth: Casale Monferrato, Italy
- Date of death: 19 October 1940 (aged 39)
- Place of death: Turin, Italy
- Height: 1.71 m (5 ft 7 in)
- Position: Left-back

Senior career*
Years	Team	Apps	(Gls)
1919–1928	Casale	182	(18)
1928–1935	Juventus	178	(0)
1935–1937	Brescia	40	(0)
Total		400	(18)

International career
1922–1934	Italy	59	(0)

Managerial career
- 1935–1937: Brescia
- 1939–1940: Juventus
Medal record
Italy
Summer Olympics
Bronze medal – third place	1928 Amsterdam
Central European International Cup
Gold medal – first place	1927–30 Central European International Cup
Central European International Cup
Silver medal – second place	1931–32 Central European International Cup
FIFA World Cup
Gold medal – first place	1934 Italy
Central European International Cup
Gold medal – first place	1933–35 Central European International Cup
- * Club domestic league appearances and goals

Umberto Caligaris (Italian pronunciation: [umˈbɛrto kaliˈɡaːris]; 26 July 1901 – 19 October 1940) was an Italian footballer who played, normally at left-back, for A.S. Casale and Juventus, before ending his career with Brescia. With Juventus, he won an Italian record of five consecutive Serie A League titles between 1930 and 1935. He played with the Italy national team, notably winning a bronze medal at the 1928 Summer Olympic Games; he was also a member of the Italian side that won the 1934 FIFA World Cup. His 59 caps for Italy stood as a record for many years. Following his retirement, he worked as a manager, coaching his former clubs Brescia and Juventus.

== Career ==
Born in Casale Monferrato (Piedmont), Caligaris spent the first nine years of his career with the local team, A.S. Casale. He made his debut for them on 12 October 1919 in a match against local rivals Valenzana Calcio which Casale won 3–1. Casale was then in the Italian First division (the predecessor to Serie A) and had won the championship in 1914. However they were never to repeat that success and although during Caligaris's career with the club they twice qualified for the inter-regional semi-final of North Italy, they were unable to get further.

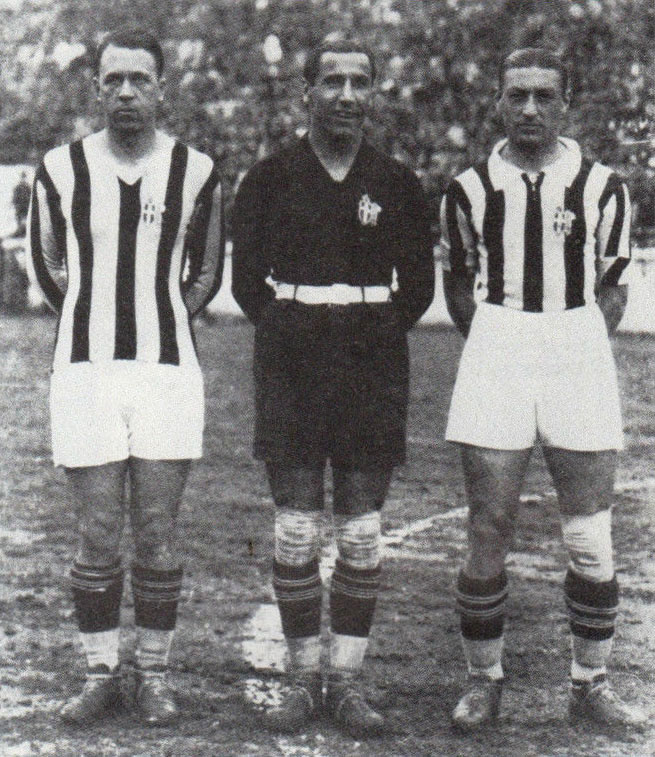
The legendary Bianconeri's defensive line in the Interwar period: right-back Rosetta, goalkeeper Combi and left-back Caligaris

The Italy national team, however, did provide scope for his talents. He received his first cap on 15 January 1922 against a strong Austria side, in Milan; he was selected in place of Virginio Rosetta as right-back flanking the great Genoese left-back Renzo De Vecchi ("Son of God" to the fans), who had been playing for Italy since 1910. From then until De Vecchi's retirement from international football in March 1925, Rosetta and Caligaris were in competition for the right-back position. He played for Italy in the 1924 Olympics, the match against Spain being the first in which he played alongside Rosetta, also winning the Central European International Cup with Italy between 1927 and 1930.

After winning a bronze medal at the 1928 Summer Olympics, Caligaris left Casale to join Rosetta at Juventus, making his Serie A debut with the club on 6 October 1929, in a 3–2 home victory over Napoli. Here the two full-backs, backed by Italian international goalkeeper Gianpiero Combi, and with centre-half Luis Monti in front of them, formed a formidable and successful defensive combination. Juventus won five scudetti in a row between 1930 and 1935.

Caligaris served as Italy's captain between 1931 and 1934. His final game for Italy on 11 February 1934 was, like his first, against Austria. (Although a member of the Italian squad, he did not play in any of the 1934 World Cup matches, as Italy went on to win the tournament on home soil.) His record of 59 caps for Italy was only surpassed in 1971 by Giacinto Facchetti.

Caligaris coached Juventus from 1939 until his death. On 19 October 1940 in Turin, Caligaris returned to the field in a match between old Juventus stars, together with his old teammates Gianpiero Combi and Virginio Rosetta, but after a few minutes of play he was forced to leave the field: taken to hospital, he was struck down by an aneurysm.

== Legacy ==
During the 1970s, an annual under-21 football tournament was named in the Italian's honour. The "Caligaris" International Tournament took place in the player's hometown of Casale Monferrato.

A left-back, Caligaris is regarded as one of the best Italian defenders of his generation.

== Honours ==
=== Club ===
Juventus

- Serie A: 1930–31, 1931–32, 1932–33, 1933–34, 1934–35

Caligaris with Italy

=== International ===
Italy

- FIFA World Cup: 1934
- Central European International Cup: 1927–30, 1933–35; Runner-up: 1931–32
- Summer Olympics: Bronze Medal 1928
