= Pedro Sernagiotto =

Italian-Brazilian footballer

Personal information
- Date of birth: November 17, 1908
- Place of birth: São Paulo, Brazil
- Date of death: April 5, 1965 (aged 56)
- Place of death: São Paulo, Brazil
- Height: 1.53 m (5 ft 0 in)
- Position: Midfielder

Senior career*
Years	Team	Apps	(Gls)
1927–1932	Palestra Itália	96	(32)
1932–1934	Juventus	50	(14)
1934–1935	Palestra Itália	9	(0)
1936–1938	São Paulo	70	(17)
1939–1940	Portuguesa	31	(6)
1941–1943	Palmeiras	29	(5)

International career
1930	Brazil	1	(0)
1934	Italy B	1	(0)
- * Club domestic league appearances and goals

Pedro Sernagiotto, also known as Pietro Sernagiotto or Ministrinho (born November 17, 1908, in São Paulo; died April 5, 1965, in São Paulo) was an Italian Brazilian professional football player. He also held Italian citizenship and on October 22, 1933, played for the Italian national B team against Hungary. He made one appearance for the Brazil national team in 1930.

== Honours ==
Palmeiras

- Campeonato Paulista: 1927, 1942

Juventus

- Serie A champion: 1932–33, 1933–34
