= Virginio Rosetta =

Italian footballer and manager

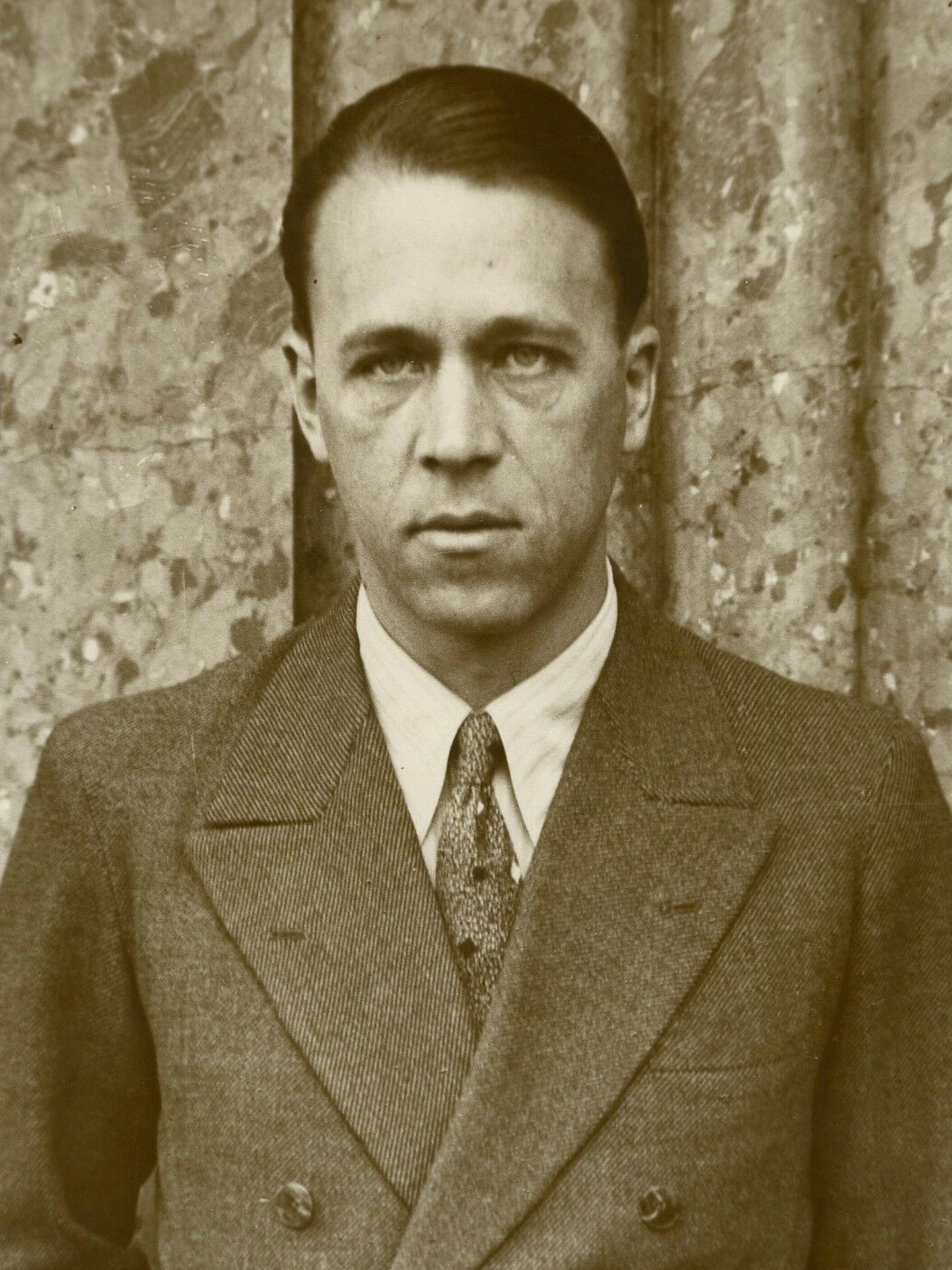
- Rosetta in 1932

Personal information
- Full name: Virginio Rosetta
- Date of birth: 25 February 1902
- Place of birth: Vercelli, Italy
- Date of death: 29 March 1975 (aged 73)
- Place of death: Turin, Italy
- Height: 1.70 m (5 ft 7 in)
- Position: Defender

Youth career
- 1918–1920: Pro Vercelli

Senior career*
Years	Team	Apps	(Gls)
1919–1920	Pro Vercelli	85	(11)
1923–1936	Juventus	338	(15)
Total		423	(26)

International career
1920–1934	Italy	52	(0)

Managerial career
- 1935–1939: Juventus
- 1939–1940: Lucchese
- 1947–1948: Palermo
Medal record
Italy
Summer Olympics
Bronze medal – third place	1928 Amsterdam
Central European International Cup
Gold medal – first place	1927–30 Central European International Cup
Central European International Cup
Silver medal – second place	1931–32 Central European International Cup
FIFA World Cup
Gold medal – first place	1934 Italy
Central European International Cup
Gold medal – first place	1933–35 Central European International Cup
- * Club domestic league appearances and goals

Virginio "Viri" Rosetta (Italian pronunciation: [virˈdʒiːnjo roˈzetta]; 25 February 1902 – 29 March 1975) was an Italian footballer who played as a defender. A hard-working player, he was known for his organisational skills, and for his ability to read the game and anticipate other players; he was also known to be a very precise passer of the ball, and an elegant full-back with good technique and a powerful shot, who was capable of starting plays from the back-line.

== Club career ==
Rosetta was born in Vercelli, Piedmont, where he debuted for Pro Vercelli in the Italian First Division (Serie A's predecessor) in the 1919–20 season, as a striker. He later turned into an effective defender.

Pro Vercelli was then one of the major Italian football teams, and Rosetta won two scudetti in 1921 and 1922. He debuted for Italy at the 1920 Summer Olympics, forming a partnership with Renzo De Vecchi.

In 1923 he moved to Juventus, where he was paid as a footballer for the first time. He won his first title in 1926, and was an integral part of the team which won five consecutive scudetti during the 1930s, serving as the club's captain. During the 1930s, he formed a formidable defensive trio along with fellow full-back Umberto Caligaris, and centre-half Luis Monti, winning five consecutive league titles.

He won a total of eight national championships, with the final five being Serie A titles, which is an Italian record. Only three other players, Gianluigi Buffon, Giovanni Ferrari, and Giuseppe Furino, have also won eight titles in the Italian leagues.

== International career ==
Rosetta was a key member of the Italy national football team throughout his career, since joining the team in 1920; he received a total of 52 caps for Italy. He was a member of the team that took part at the 1920 Summer Olympics, and was also part of the squads which placed fifth at the 1924 Summer Olympics, and which subsequently won the bronze medal at the 1928 Summer Olympics. As well as the very successful squads of the 1927–30 Central European International Cup, 1931–32 Central European International Cup, and 1933–35 Central European International Cup and last but not least, Rosetta was also a member of the 1934 FIFA World Cup winning squad. He was captain in Italy's first game at the tournament, but it proved to be his last international appearance and he did not play in the final itself.

== After retirement ==
Rosetta retired from professional football in 1936. He died in Turin in 1975.

== Honours ==
=== Player ===
==== Club ====
Pro Vercelli

- Serie A: 1920–21, 1921–22

Juventus

- Serie A: 1925–26, 1930–31, 1931–32, 1932–33, 1933–34, 1934–35

==== International ====
Italy

- FIFA World Cup: 1934
- Central European International Cup: 1927–30, 1933–35; Runner-up: 1931–32
- Summer Olympics: Bronze Medal 1928

==== Individual ====
- Juventus FC Hall of Fame: 2025

=== Coach ===
Juventus

- Coppa Italia: 1937–38

Palermo

- Serie B: 1947–48
