= Giovanni Moretti (footballer) =

Italian footballer

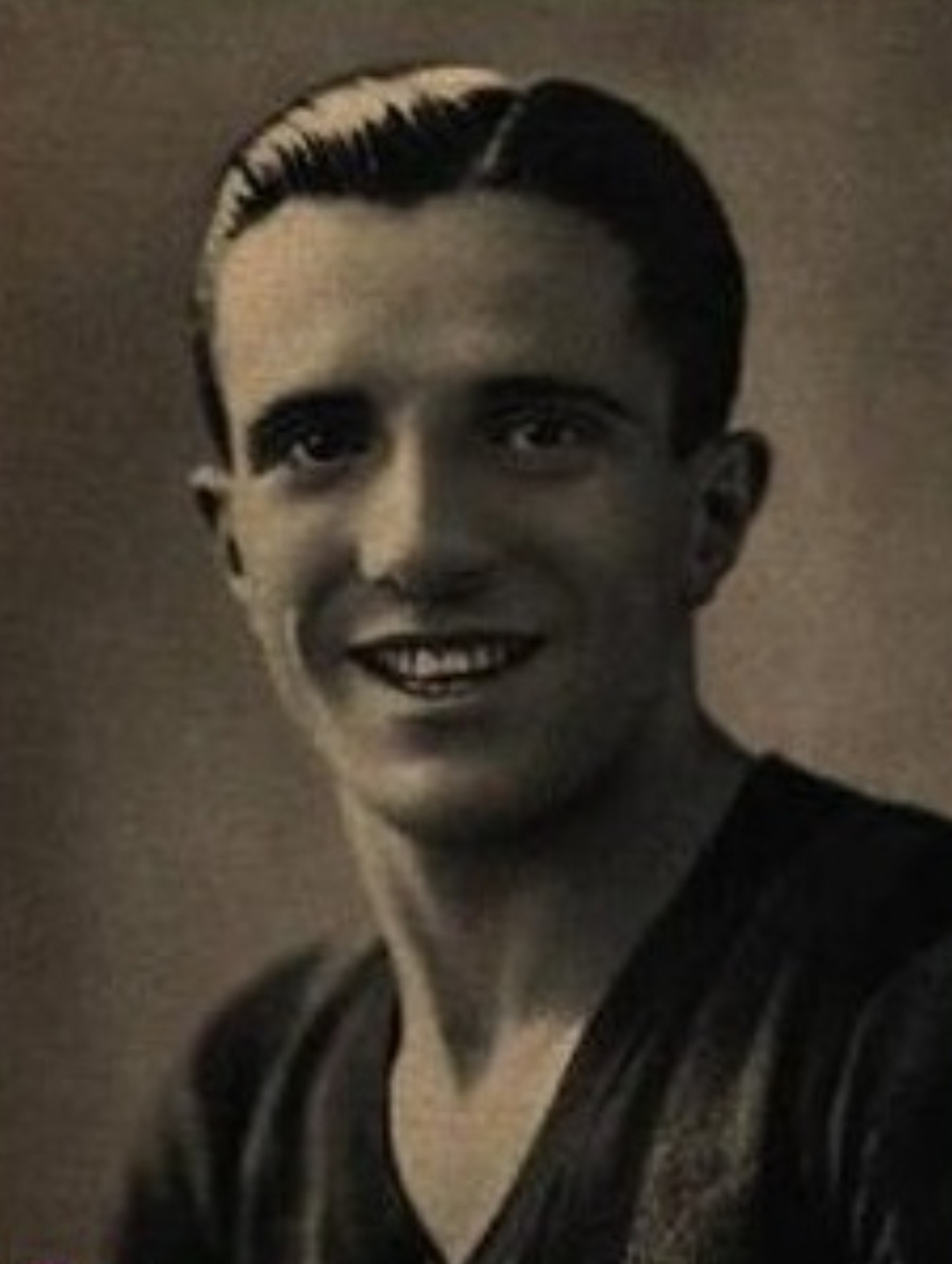

Personal information
- Full name: Giovanni Moretti
- Date of birth: 3 December 1909
- Place of birth: Crema, Italy
- Date of death: 1 February 1971 (aged 61)
- Place of death: Crema, Italy
- Height: 1.75 m (5 ft 9 in)
- Position: Forward

Senior career*
Years	Team	Apps	(Gls)
1930–1931	Crema		
1931–1939	Milan	207	(61)
1939–1941	Brescia	60	(19)
1946–1947	Crema		
- * Club domestic league appearances and goals

Giovanni Moretti (3 December 1909 – 1 February 1971) was an Italian professional footballer, who played as a forward.
