= 1941–42 Coppa Italia =

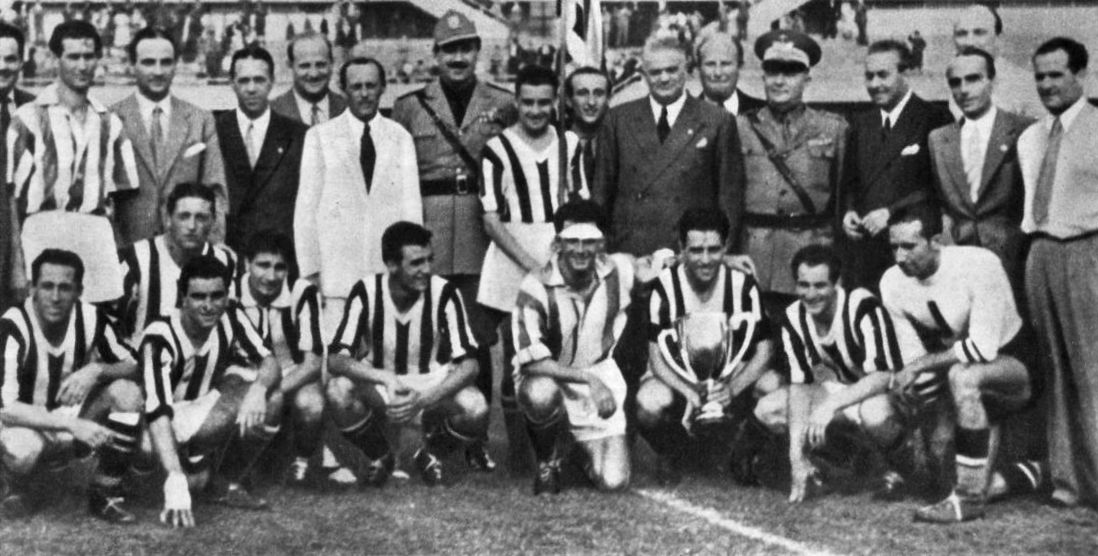
- Juventus poses with the trophy

Tournament details
- Country: Italy
- Dates: 5 Oct 1941 – 28 June 1942
- Teams: 34

Final positions
- Champions: Juventus (2nd title)
- Runners-up: Milano

Tournament statistics
- Matches played: 34
- Goals scored: 122 (3.59 per match)
- Top goal scorer: Riza Lushta (8 goals)

The 1941–42 Coppa Italia was the ninth edition of the major Italian domestic football tournament. The competition was won by Juventus.

Due to World War II, Serie C clubs were excluded.

== Serie B elimination round ==
Home team	Score	Away team
Udinese	0-1	Pro Patria
Novara	2-1	Fanfulla

== Round of 32 ==
Home team	Score	Away team
Juventus	5-0	Pro Patria
Bologna	4-0	Alessandria
Lazio	4-2	Bari
Livorno	4-1	Triestina
Liguria	0-2	Atalanta
Lucchese	1-2	Reggiana
Milano	4-1	Fiorentina
Modena	4-1	Ambrosiana-Inter
Novara	1-0 (aet)	Roma
Brescia	2-1	Savona
Vicenza	1-2	Prato
Padova	2-0	Napoli
Pescara	1-2	Genova 1893
Spezia	4-0	Fiumana
Siena	1-2 (aet)	Pisa
Venezia	2-1	Torino

== Round of 16 ==
Home team	Score	Away team
Juventus	2-1	Genova 1893
Milano	4-2	Lazio
Livorno	2-4	Bologna
Pisa	0-4	Venezia
Novara	2-1	Spezia
Padova	3-2	Brescia
Prato	0-4	Reggiana
Modena	3-1	Atalanta

== Quarter-finals ==
Home team	Score	Away team
Juventus	1-0	Padova
Modena	2-0	Novara
Venezia	2-0	Bologna
Milano	6-0	Reggiana

== Semi-finals ==
Home team	Score	Away team
Juventus	4-1	Modena
Milano	2-1	Venezia

== Final ==
=== First leg ===
21 June 1942

Milano	1–1	Juventus
Cappello 83'		Bellini 37'

San Siro, Milan
Referee: Generoso Dattilo

=== Second leg ===
28 June 1942

Juventus	4–1	Milano
Lushta 29', 69', 71'; Sentimenti 34' (pen.)		Boffi 56'

Stadio Benito Mussolini, Turin
Referee: Giovanni Galeati

Juventus won 5–2 on aggregate.

== Top goalscorers ==
Rank	Player	Club	Goals
1	(Albania) Riza Lushta	Juventus	8
2	(Italy) Aldo Boffi	Milano	6
2	(Italy) Valeriano Ottino	Modena	6
4	(Italy) Angelo Bollano	Milano	3
4	(Uruguay) Juan Agostino Alberti	Venezia	3
4	(Italy) Savino Bellini	Juventus	3
4	(Italy) Vinicio Viani	Livorno	3
4	(Italy) Silvio Piola	Lazio	3
4	(Italy) Eusebio Castigliano	Spezia	3
