= 1934–35 Serie A =

34th season of top-tier Italian football

Serie A
- Season: 1934–35
- Champions: Juventus; 7th title
- Relegated: Livorno; Pro Vercelli
- Matches: 240
- Goals: 629 (2.62 per match)
- Top goalscorer: Enrique Guaita (28 goals)

The 1934-35 Serie A was the thirty-fifth edition of the Italian Football Championship and its sixth season since 1929 re-branding to create Serie A. It was the twelfth season from which the Italian Football Champions adorned their team jerseys in the subsequent season with a Scudetto. Juventus were champions for the last of five successive season and for the seventh time in their history. This was their sixth scudetto since the scudetto started being awarded in 1924 and their fifth win contested as Serie A.

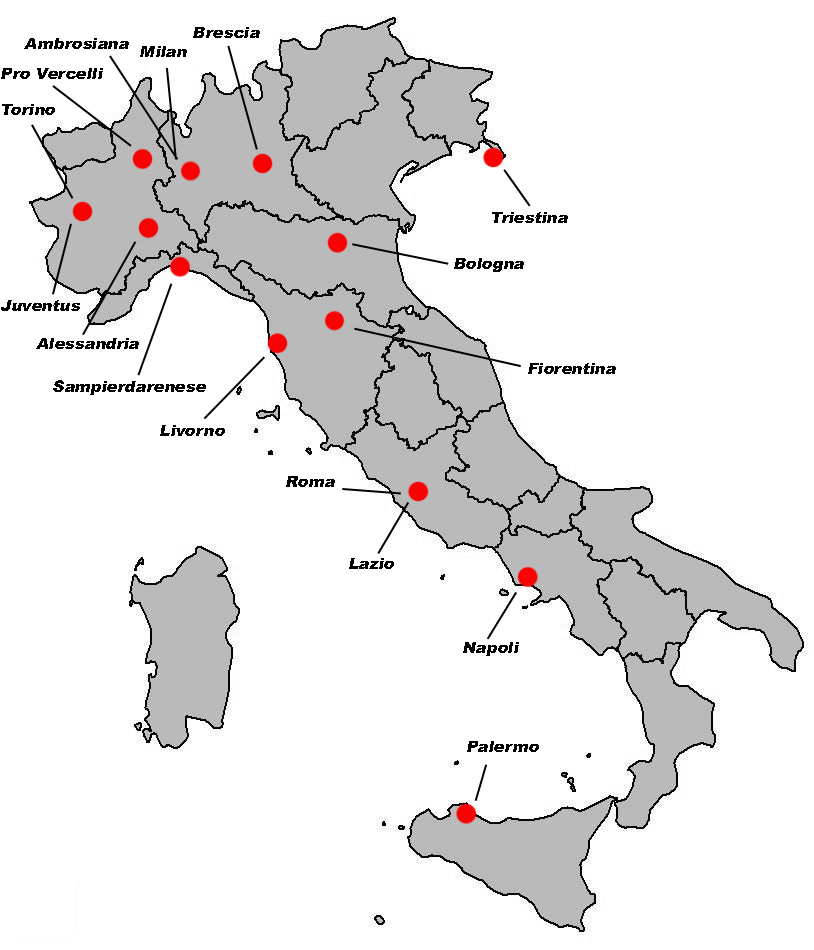
Serie A 1934-35 teams distribution

== Teams ==
Sampierdarenese had been promoted from Serie B.

== Final classification ==
Pos	Team	Pld	W	D	L	GF	GA	GD	Pts	Qualification or relegation
1	Juventus (C)	30	18	8	4	45	22	+23	44	1935 Mitropa Cup
2	Ambrosiana-Inter	30	15	12	3	58	24	+34	42	1935 Mitropa Cup
3	Fiorentina	30	15	9	6	39	23	+16	39	1935 Mitropa Cup
4	Roma	30	14	7	9	63	38	+25	35	1935 Mitropa Cup
5	Lazio	30	13	6	11	55	46	+9	32	
6	Bologna	30	11	8	11	46	34	+12	30	
7	Napoli	30	10	9	11	39	38	+1	29	
7	Alessandria	30	12	5	13	44	48	−4	29	
7	Palermo	30	9	11	10	27	34	−7	29	
10	Milan	30	8	11	11	36	38	−2	27	
10	Triestina	30	11	5	14	33	44	−11	27	
10	Brescia	30	10	7	13	29	45	−16	27	
13	Sampierdarenese	30	9	8	13	29	42	−13	26	
14	Torino	30	8	9	13	37	45	−8	25	
15	Livorno (R)	30	8	8	14	28	54	−26	24	Relegation to Serie B
16	Pro Vercelli (R)	30	5	5	20	21	54	−33	15	Relegation to Serie B

Source: Panini
(C) Champions; (R) Relegated

== Results ==
Home \ Away	ALE	AMB	BOL	BRE	FIO	JUV	LAZ	LIV	MIL	NAP	PAL	PVE	ROM	SAM	TOR	TRI
Alessandria		1–3	2–0	1–0	2–0	0–0	1–2	4–1	2–1	4–2	4–2	2–1	1–6	2–2	3–0	3–0
Ambrosiana-Inter	0–0		1–0	5–1	1–1	0–0	1–0	5–1	2–0	2–1	3–0	1–0	0–1	6–1	4–0	7–0
Bologna	3–3	0–0		3–0	2–1	2–0	1–2	4–0	6–3	3–0	0–0	5–0	1–1	0–1	3–1	1–3
Brescia	1–0	1–1	1–1		1–1	0–2	1–0	4–0	2–0	0–1	2–2	3–0	2–1	1–0	2–1	2–1
Fiorentina	4–1	1–1	1–0	1–0		0–1	2–1	0–1	1–0	3–2	2–0	1–0	4–1	0–0	4–0	1–0
Juventus	4–1	1–0	1–0	0–0	0–0		6–1	2–1	1–0	2–1	2–1	3–0	2–1	4–0	1–1	0–0
Lazio	0–1	4–2	2–1	4–0	3–5	5–3		6–1	1–4	3–1	1–0	6–0	0–0	2–1	1–1	0–0
Livorno	1–0	1–1	4–1	3–1	1–2	1–2	0–2		0–2	0–2 (Note: Decided by the FIGC.)	0–3	1–0	1–1	0–0	1–1	1–0
Milan	2–2	2–2	0–0	0–1	1–1	3–0	1–1	1–1		2–2	2–1	1–0	4–4	2–1	0–0	0–1
Napoli	0–1	0–1	1–1	2–0	1–1	0–0	3–0	1–1	0–1		6–0	1–0	3–2	1–1	2–1	2–1
Palermo	2–0	1–1	0–1	0–0	0–0	0–0	2–1	2–2	1–0	2–0		2–0	1–0	1–0	0–0	2–0
Pro Vercelli	1–0	1–1	2–1	1–1	2–0	0–1	1–0	0–1	1–2	1–1	0–0		1–4	2–3	0–3	4–2
Roma	3–0	3–4	1–1	4–0	0–0	1–2	1–1	5–1	1–0	4–0	5–1	3–2		2–0	2–1	1–2
Sampierdarenese	2–1	0–0	2–1	3–0	0–1	0–1	2–3	0–0	0–0	1–3	1–0	0–0	1–0		3–2	1–0
Torino	2–1	1–2	0–1	4–2	1–0	1–3	2–2	1–0	1–1	0–0	0–0	2–0	2–3	5–2		3–1
Triestina	3–1	1–1	1–3	3–0	0–1	2–1	2–1	1–2	2–1	0–0	1–1	3–1	0–2	2–1	1–0	

Source: Almanacco Illustrato del Calcio - La Storia 1898-2004, Panini Edizioni, Modena, September 2005 (in Italian)
Legend: Blue = home team win; Yellow = draw; Red = away team win.

== Top goalscorers ==
Rank	Player	Club	Goals
1	(Argentina) (Italy) Enrique Guaita	Roma	28
2	(Italy) Silvio Piola	Lazio	21
3	(Italy) Giuseppe Meazza	Ambrosiana-Inter	18
4	(Italy) Renato Cattaneo	Alessandria	16
5	(Italy) Felice Borel	Juventus	13
6	(Italy) Angelo Schiavio	Bologna	12
7	(Italy) Giovanni Busoni	Livorno	11
7	(Italy) Nereo Rocco	Triestina	11
7	(Argentina) (Italy) Alejandro Scopelli	Roma	11
10	(Italy) Pietro Arcari	Milan	10
10	(Italy) Cherubino Comini	Sampierdarenese	10
10	(Argentina) (Italy) Attilio Demaría	Ambrosiana-Inter	10
10	(Italy) Germano Mian	Triestina	10
10	(Italy) Giovanni Moretti	Milan	10
10	(Italy) Vinicio Viani	Fiorentina	10
10	(Italy) Antonio Vojak	Napoli	10

== References and sources ==
- Almanacco Illustrato del Calcio - La Storia 1898-2004, Panini Edizioni, Modena, September 2005
