= Aebi =

Aebi is a surname. It is a Swiss German pet name for the personal name Adalbert (Albert). People with the surname include:

- Andreas Aebi (born 1958), Swiss politician
- Beat Aebi (born 1966), Swiss football player
- Ermanno Aebi (1892–1976), Italian-Swiss football player
- Giorgio Aebi (1923–2005), Italian football player
- Irene Aebi (born 1939), Swiss musician
- Magdalena Aebi (1898–1980), Swiss philosopher
- Max Aebi (born 1948), Swiss-Canadian physician
- Ormond Aebi (1916–2004), American beekeeper
- Regula Aebi (born 1965), Swiss sprinter
- Tania Aebi (born 1966), Swiss-American sailor
- Ueli Aebi (1946–2025), Swiss structural biologist

== See also ==
- Aeby (similar name)
