= Arsenal de Llavallol =

- Full name: Club Arsenal de Llavallol
- Founded: 12 October 1948; 77 years ago 4 March 2024; 2 years ago (Refounding)
- Ground: Rancho Taxco, Llavallol, Argentina
- President: Sebastián Domed
- Manager: Ricardo Figueroa
- League: Liga Metropolitana de Fútbol de San Vicente
- 2024: Champion
Home colours

Club Arsenal de Llavallol or simply Arsenal de Llavallol is an Argentine football club from the Llavallol district of Greater Buenos Aires. The club would become the reserve team of Boca Juniors in 1964, Nevertheless, Arsenal had a short life of only 20 years being dissolved in 1968. On March 4, 2024, it was refounded.

Some prominent players of Boca Juniors started their careers at Arsenal, such as Angel Clemente Rojas, Rubén Magdalena, Antonio Angelillo, Vladislao Cap, Humberto Maschio, Natalio Sivo, and Norberto Shiro, among others.

== History ==
=== Beginning ===
First Arsenal kit (1948–64)

Arsenal de Llavallol was established in Florencio Varela on 12 October 1948 by Aníbal Díaz, a fan of English football who was also the president, coach and business man of the club. The origins of the name "Arsenal" are unclear, but some sources state that Díaz would have taken the name from the homonymous English club.

Arsenal had been founded with the purpose of participating in "Torneos Evita", the children's football championship organized by Fundación Eva Perón that was very popular by those years. After the team won the 1950 Evita's championship with a team formed by players drafted around the country, the Ministry of Finance of Argentina collaborated with Arsenal giving the club some lands located in Llavallol, Greater Buenos Aires, where the club built its headquarters and stadium, which was made of concrete instead of wood as many clubs had by then. Once the works finished, Arsenal requested Argentine Football Association (AFA) being affiliated to play the official tournaments of Argentine football league system.

=== Affiliation to AFA ===
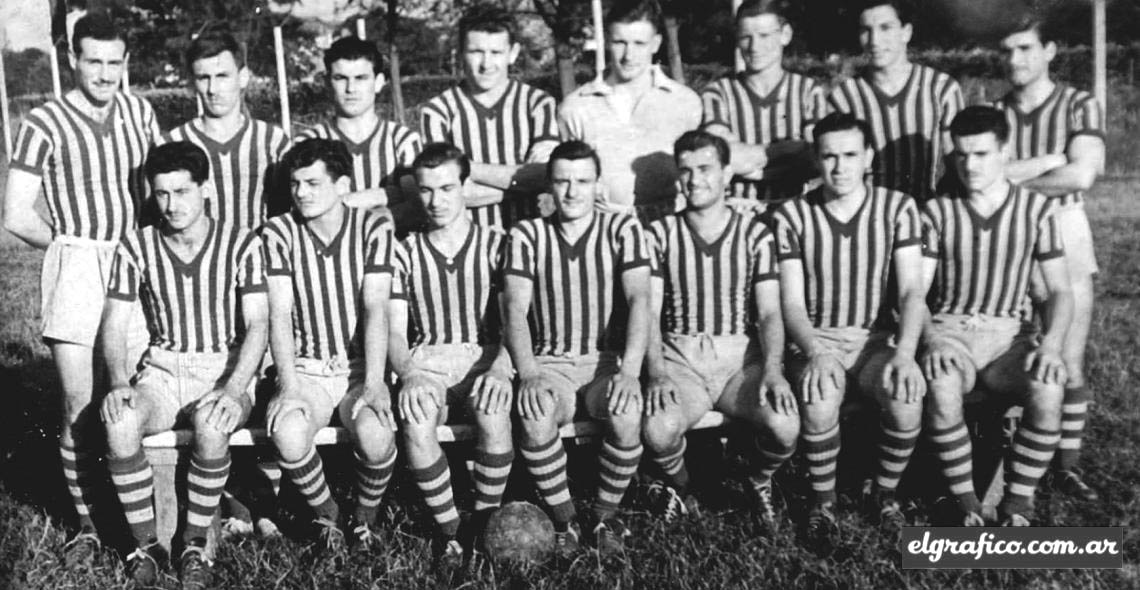
Team of Arsenal wearing the original brown and golden shirt in 1955

The AFA accepted the request in 1952 so Arsenal made its debut that same year in "Tercera de Ascenso" (current Primera D Metropolitana), where Arsenal debuted on 27 April 1952 v Brown de Adrogué, that thrashed them 7–0. Díaz was not only the founder but also president and even manager. During its first tenure on the official football Arsenal totalized 16 points. In 1954 Arsenal promoted to Segunda de Ascenso division (current Primera C) along with arch-rival Sacachispas although the team had been finished 5th. That happened because Arsenal had requested AFA to play at a higher division due to its number of members and the stadium conditions, which fulfilled the conditions demanded by the Association.

Arsenal did not have successful campaigns in the Primera C and the team was relegated again in 1958. After disputing 14 fixtures of the 1959 championship, Arsenal was disaffiliated from the AFA due to a conflict with club's president Díaz, who was accused by the Association of forging AFA president Daniel Colombo's signature to transfer players outside Argentina. The team did not play again officially until 1962.

In 1961, Díaz agreed with River Plate that Arsenal players would train at the club, also making them members of River Plate. Nevertheless, the agreement only lasted eight months.

=== Acquisition by Boca Juniors ===
Arsenal is a result of Boca Juniors football academy, being property of the club since 1962. The costs of that transaction is $ 7 million to date. Adolfo Pedernera was named director of the project.

— El Gráfico about the acquisition, 1964

In 1962 Arsenal became a reserve team of Boca Juniors which acquired its facilities and other assets. The presidents of each club, Alberto J. Armando (Boca Juniors) and Aníbal Díaz (Arsenal), signed an agreement for Boca to buy Arsenal at a price of three and a half million pesos. Because of the agreement, the 56 Arsenal players became part of Boca Juniors, while other players (Rojas and Oscar Pianetti among them) were loaned to Arsenal. After becoming Boca Juniors' subsidiary, Arsenal changed its former brown and gold jersey to the blue and gold of Boca Juniors.

I was in Boca and they told me that I had been sent to a certain "Arsenal de Llavallol". To be honest, I was less than enthusiastic so I had to ride from Sarandí by bus... but I was promised to earn a salary. Imagine that I had been raised in a poor family, I could not believe it. I will never forget that club. I fell in love with the blue and gold when playing for Arsenal.

Second Arsenal kit (1964–68)

=== Final years ===
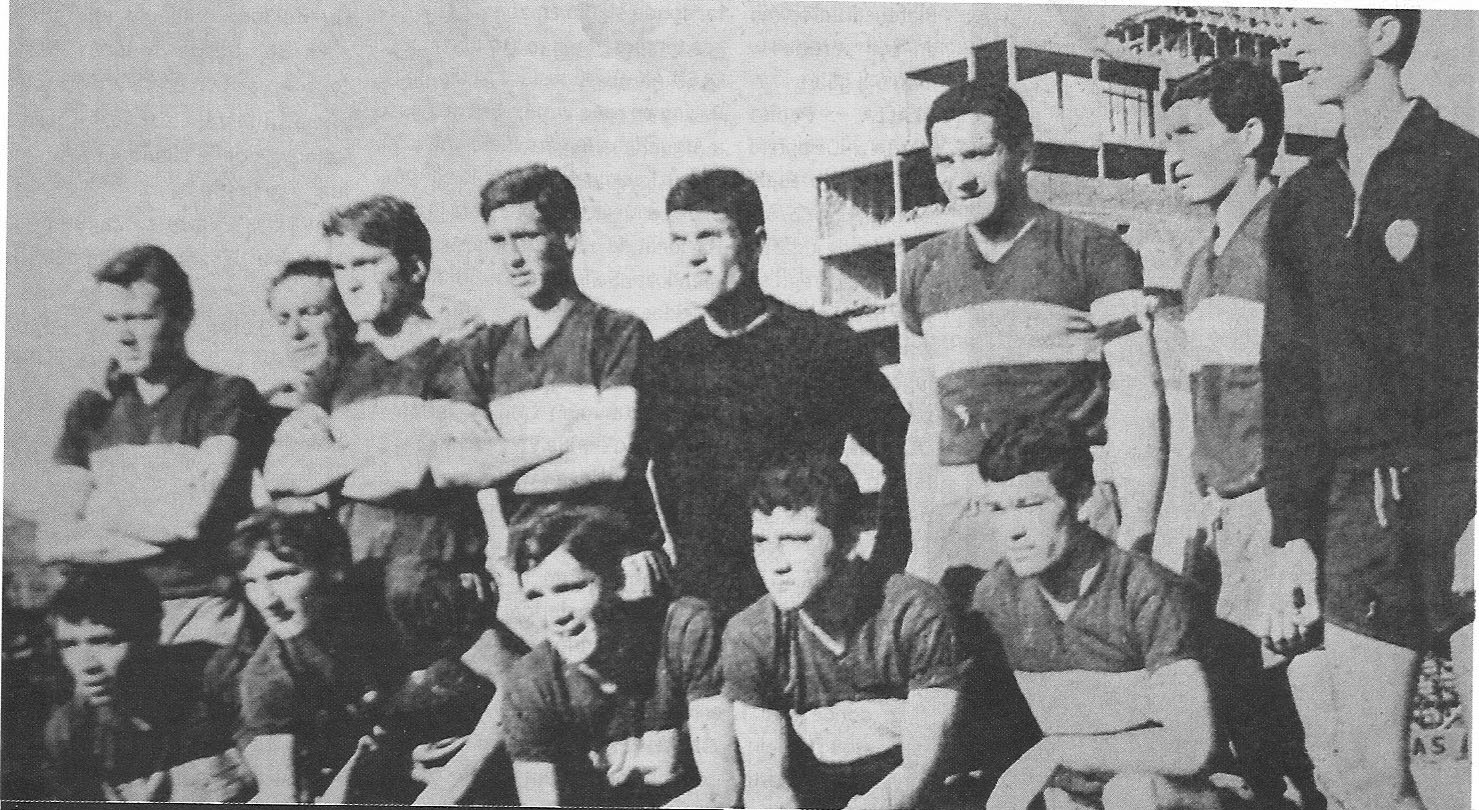
Team of Arsenal (with the Boca Juniors shirt) that won their only official title, 1964 Primera D

In 1964 Arsenal won their first official title after beating Ituzaingó 3–2 on aggregate. The legend "The Boca Juniors school is the champion" appeared in the headlines of Crónica newspaper. The squad, coached by Rogelio Muñiz under the permanent supervision of Adolfo Pedernera and with an average age of 22, played 29 matches, winning 20 with 6 losses. Angel Rojas (who would later become a Boca Juniors star) and Oscar Pianetti were the most notable players of the team that achieved promotion to Primera C.

When the "de facto" Government presided by Juan Carlos Onganía demanded the restitution of Arsenal's lands that had been donated to them during the presidency of Juan Perón. The lands where the club had built its facilities were restored to the Province and the stadium demolished. Club Arsenal was also left behind by Boca Juniors which had acquired La Candela, a facility dedicated to training Boca's youth players. Arsenal was disaffiliated from AFA on 12 October 1968, exactly 20 years after its foundation, and dissolved soon after. The team played their last match just the same day, when it was defeated by Central Córdoba de Rosario 4–2. The stadium would be then demolished and the club disappeared. Its founder and alma mater, Aníbal Díaz, died in March 1973.

=== Refoundation ===
On March 4, 2024, it was refounded. The team currently plays in the Liga Metropolitana de Fútbol de San Vicente. They achieved promotion to the Prefederal Elite Zone for the year 2025. They were also awarded the Fair Play Award for being the team with the best behavior

They were crowned champions of the 2024 San Vicente Metropolitan Association Championship in both the First and Third Divisions, earning promotion to the Elite Pre-Federal Division for 2025. They also received the Fair Play Award for their exemplary conduct.

For 2025, they submitted an application to participate in that year's edition of the Amateur Promotional Tournament, but were not accepted. They are hoping to participate in the tournament in 2026.

== Titles ==
- Primera D (1): 1964
