= Cristian Grabinski =

Argentine footballer

Personal information
- Full name: Cristian Emilio Grabinski
- Date of birth: January 12, 1980 (age 46)
- Place of birth: Llavallol, Argentina
- Height: 1.80 m (5 ft 11 in)
- Position: Centre back

Youth career
- Vecinos Unidos
- Atlético Río Tercero
- Newell's Old Boys

Senior career*
Years	Team	Apps	(Gls)
1999–2003	Newell's Old Boys	83	(1)
2003–2006	Racing Club	56	(4)
2006	Colón	6	(0)
2007	AEK Larnaca	0	(0)
2008	Emelec	1	(0)
2008–2010	Chacarita Juniors	62	(5)
2010–2012	San Martín SJ	86	(2)
2013	Deportes Iquique	6	(0)
2013	Trinidad	–	(–)
2013	Juventud Alianza	4	(0)

Managerial career
- 2014–2015: Juventud Alianza
- 2015: Boca Unidos (assistant)
- 2016: Unión Santiago
- 2019: Social Bañado
- 2020: San Martín El Bañado
- 2023: Deportivo Armenio
- 2024: Villa Dálmine
- * Club domestic league appearances and goals

Cristian Emilio Grabinski (born 12 January 1980 in Llavallol) is an Argentine former football defender.

== Career ==
Grabinski began his playing career with Newell's Old Boys, he made his league debut in a 1–1 draw with Talleres on 21 June 1999. He joined Racing Club from his local district of Avellaneda in 2003 where he played until 2006.

After a brief stint with Colón de Santa Fe Grabinski travelled to Europe to play for Cypriot side AEK Larnaca in 2007. He returned to South America in 2008 to play for Emelec of Ecuador before joining Chacarita Juniors in 2008.

In his first season with the club he helped them finish in 2nd place in the Argentine 2nd division and obtain promotion to the Primera División.

In 2013, Grabinski moved to Chile and played for Deportes Iquique.
