= Omar Sívori =

Argentine-Italian footballer (1935–2005)

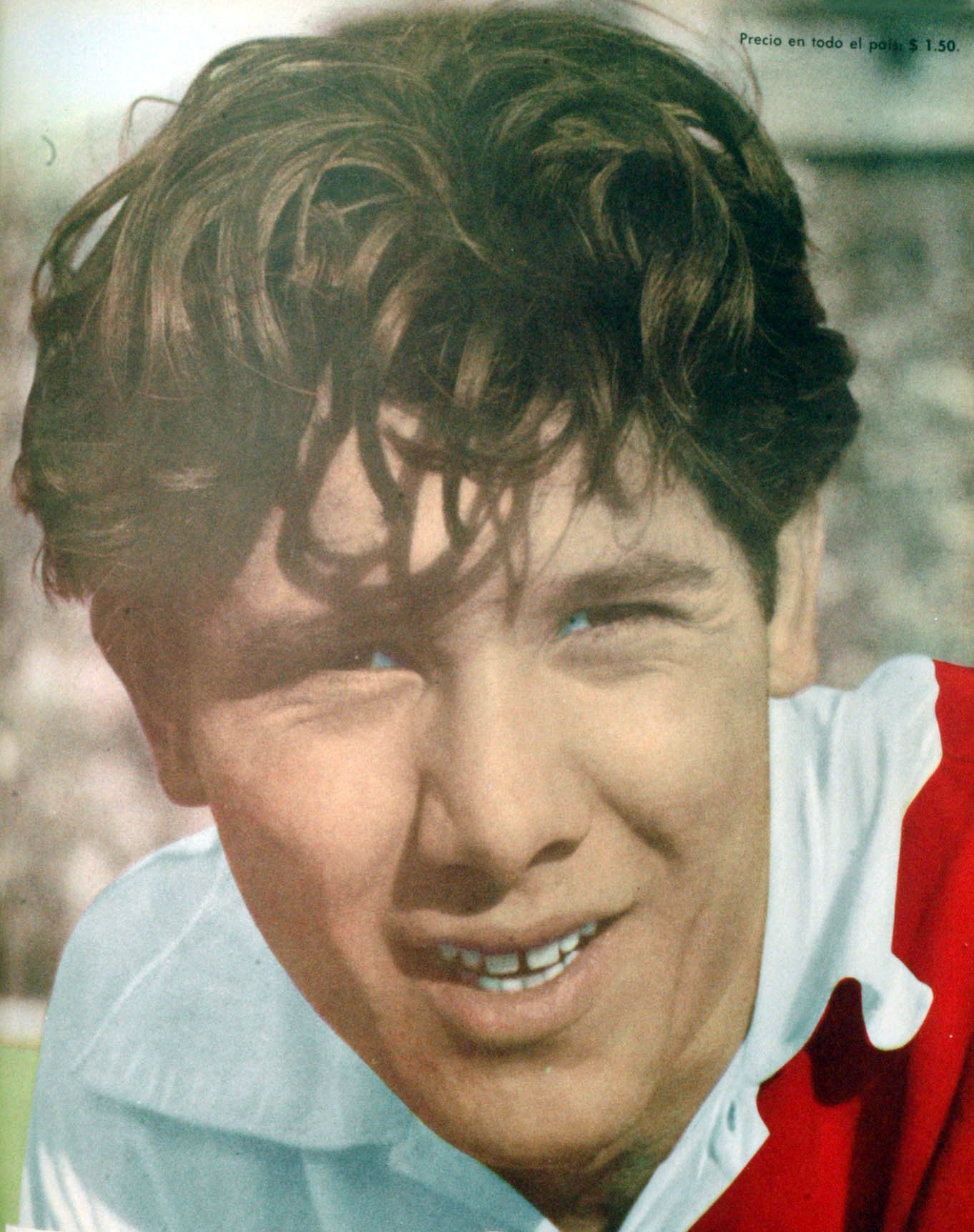
- Sívori at River Plate in 1954

Personal information
- Full name: Enrique Omar Sívori
- Date of birth: 2 October 1935
- Place of birth: San Nicolás, Argentina
- Date of death: 17 February 2005 (aged 69)
- Place of death: San Nicolás, Argentina
- Height: 1.63 m (5 ft 4 in)
- Position: Forward

Youth career
- 1950–1951: Club San Nicolás
- 1952–1954: River Plate

Senior career*
Years	Team	Apps	(Gls)
1954–1957	River Plate	63	(29)
1957–1965	Juventus	215	(135)
1965–1969	Napoli	63	(12)
Total		341	(176)

International career
1956–1957	Argentina	19	(9)
1961–1962	Italy	9	(8)

Managerial career
- 1969–1970: Rosario Central
- 1972: Estudiantes
- 1972–1973: Argentina
- 1979: Racing Club
- 1983: Toronto Italia
Medal record
Men's Football
Representing Argentina
South American Football Championship
Winner	1957 Peru
- * Club domestic league appearances and goals

Enrique Omar Sívori (Spanish: [enˈrike oˈmaɾ ˈsiβoɾi], Italian: [ˈɔːmar ˈsiːvori]; 2 October 1935 – 17 February 2005) was an Argentine-Italian football player and manager who played as a forward. At club level, he is known for his successful time with Italian side Juventus during the late 1950s and early 1960s, where he won three Serie A titles among other trophies; he also played for River Plate in Argentina and Napoli in Italy.

He made his international debut for Argentina, winning the South American Championship in 1957. Later in his career, he represented Italy and took part in the 1962 World Cup. After his retirement as player, he coached several teams in Argentina.

Sívori is considered as one of the best players of his generation and also one of the greatest players of all time, he was known for his skill, speed, goalscoring, technique, creativity, and his footballing talent was widely acclaimed. He won the South American Championship Best Player award in 1957, and the coveted Ballon d'Or award in 1961. He scored 432 goals in his career, including friendlies.

== Club career ==
=== River Plate ===
Sívori was born in San Nicolás de los Arroyos, Buenos Aires Province, into a family of Italian descent. His paternal grandfather, Giulio Sivori, was an immigrant from Cavi di Lavagna, a hamlet in the province of Genoa, while his mother Carolina was of Abruzzese ancestry. As a youngster Sívori became heavily interested in the game of football and by the time he reached his teens he was signed up to a side from the city of Buenos Aires, River Plate. The teenage Sívori was given a chance to break through into a squad which included players like the famed forward Ángel Labruna and Félix Loustau who established themselves in the era of La Máquina, one of the foremost formations in football history. He soon earned the nickname El Cabezón (bighead) from the fans, due to his hair, outspokenness, confidence, arrogance, and playing style.

River was able to win the Argentine Primera División in 1955, the title was confirmed when River beat local archrival Boca Juniors 2–1 at La Bombonera, in Buenos Aires, with just one game remaining. The same season River won the Copa Río de La Plata by beating Nacional from Uruguay. The following season he had similar success when River won the Argentine league title on the final day of the season; beating Rosario Central 4–0, with Sívori scoring the final goal. Sívori would play his final game for River against the same team on 5 May 1957.

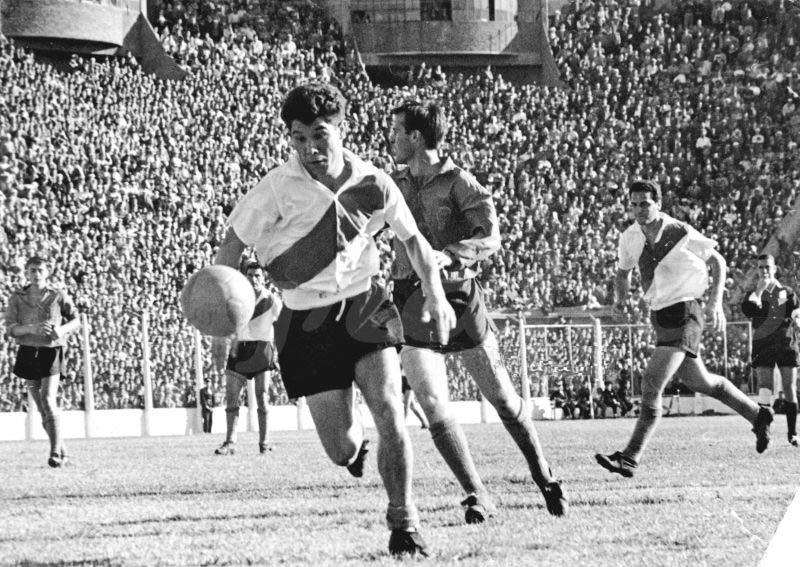
Sívori dribbing in a match v. Huracán

During the 1957–58 season, the 21-year-old Sívori was signed by Italian club Juventus after being spotted by Renato Cesarini. Juventus paid 10 million pesos (the equivalent of £91,000) for the transfer, which was a world-record transfer fee for the time. Sívori's move would prove bad for River's league fortunes, in the 18 years after 1957 they were unable to win the league in Argentina. However, they were able to complete their El Monumental stadium (previously nicknamed "the horseshoe") by adding a fourth stand bearing his name, with the money from the deal.

=== Juventus ===
The same season two other prominent Argentines moved to the Italian league: Antonio Valentín Angelillo (Inter) and Humberto Maschio (Bologna). The three had all been part of Argentina's defenders that brought home gold from the 1957 South American Championship. With an emphasis on the forward line positions, the team was nicknamed The Angels with Dirty Faces, a reference to cinema's then-celebrated Angels with Dirty Faces–the team's irreverent style of play and lackadaisical attitude to training. The nickname followed the trio after the tournament and their move to Italy. In Italy, the trio were nicknamed The Trio of Death, the trio's clinical ability in scoring goals.

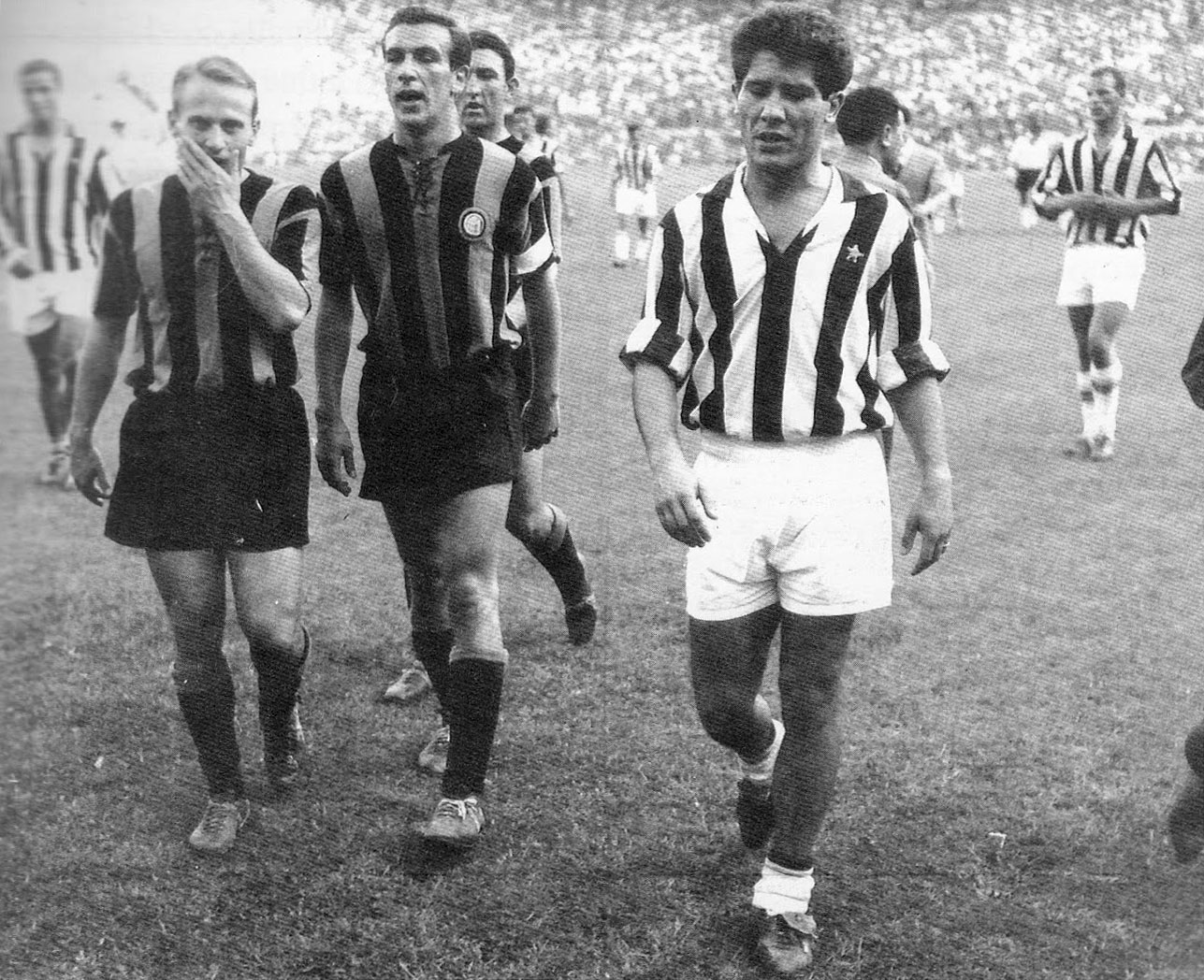
Sívori (right) with Juventus in 1958, while leaving the field of San Siro near his compatriot Angelillo of Inter Milan

Prior to the arrival of Sívori and Welshman John Charles, Juventus had been going through somewhat of a slump. However, the duo along with experienced Juventino Giampiero Boniperti put together a formidable force and won Serie A during the 1957–58 season. Their good form continued and Sívori won two more scudetti (1959–60 and 1960–61) as well as two Coppa Italia titles (1958–59 and 1959–60), and the Coppa delle Alpi (1963). Omar Sívori's hard work had paid off and he was named European Footballer of the Year (also known as Ballon d'Or) in 1961.

The same year as his personal achievement however, the Magical Trio as they were known, had broken up with Boniperti's retirement and the following season John Charles moved back to Leeds United. Sívori stayed on with the Old Lady, notably scoring the only goal in a 1–0 victory against Real Madrid, making Juventus the first Italian side ever to win at the Santiago Bernabéu Stadium. Sívori wore the number 10 shirt and was appointed the team's captain in 1963, but did not win any more championships or trophies with Juventus, and left after the 1964–65 season, because of a disagreement with new coach Heriberto Herrera.

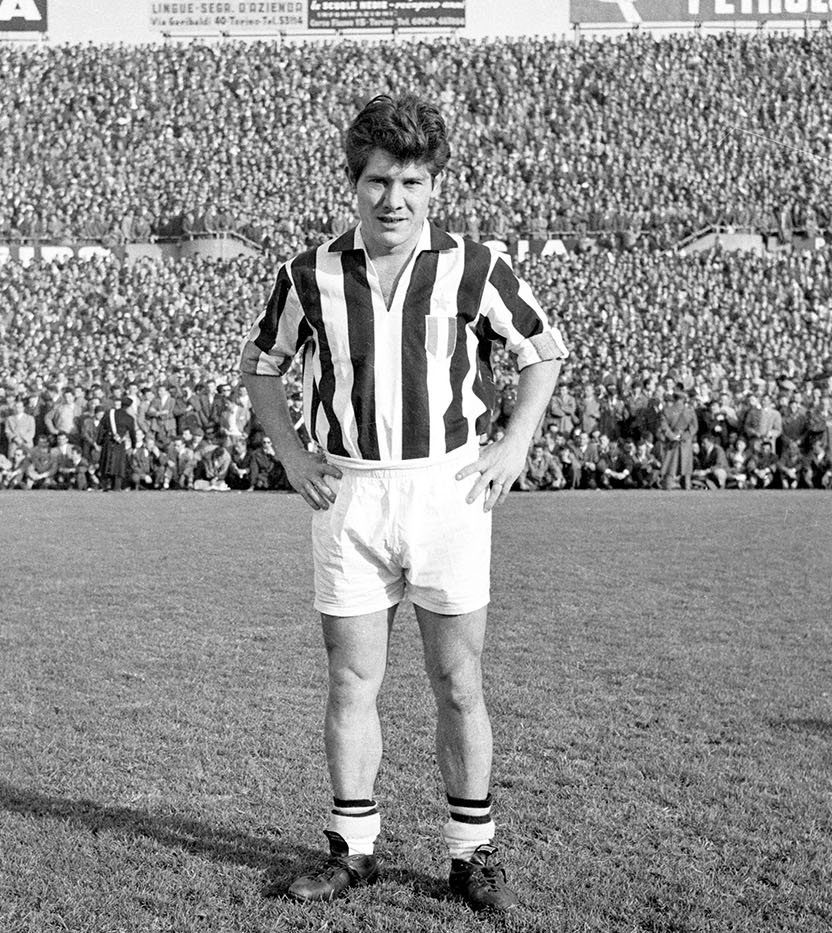
Sívori posing in Bianconeri colours inside the Communal Stadium in Turin

With Juventus, Sívori scored 167 goals in 253 appearances in all competitions, making him the club's fifth highest goalscorer ever as of 2011. He also holds the record for most Serie A goals in a single league match; during the 9–1 victory against Inter Milan on 10 June 1961 he scored six goals; this record is jointly shared with Silvio Piola of Pro Vercelli.

=== Napoli ===
In 1965, Sívori signed with Napoli, helping them to a third-place finish in the first season at the club; they also won the Coppa delle Alpi. After two successful seasons at the club, Napoli's squad during the 1967–68 season boasted several talents along with Sívori, such as goalkeeper Dino Zoff, and fellow strike partner José Altafini, and were considered one of the favourites to win the league title; the club took A.C. Milan all the way in the battle for the Serie A championship but eventually finished in second place, while Sívori was ruled out for most of the season due to a knee injury and several clashes with manager Bruno Pesaola. Ironically, Sívori's last game for Napoli was against his former club Juventus, in which he was given a red card for kicking Erminio Favalli, and was suspended for six matches. Following his ban, Sívori decided to return to Argentina during the 1968–69 season.

== International career ==
=== Argentina ===
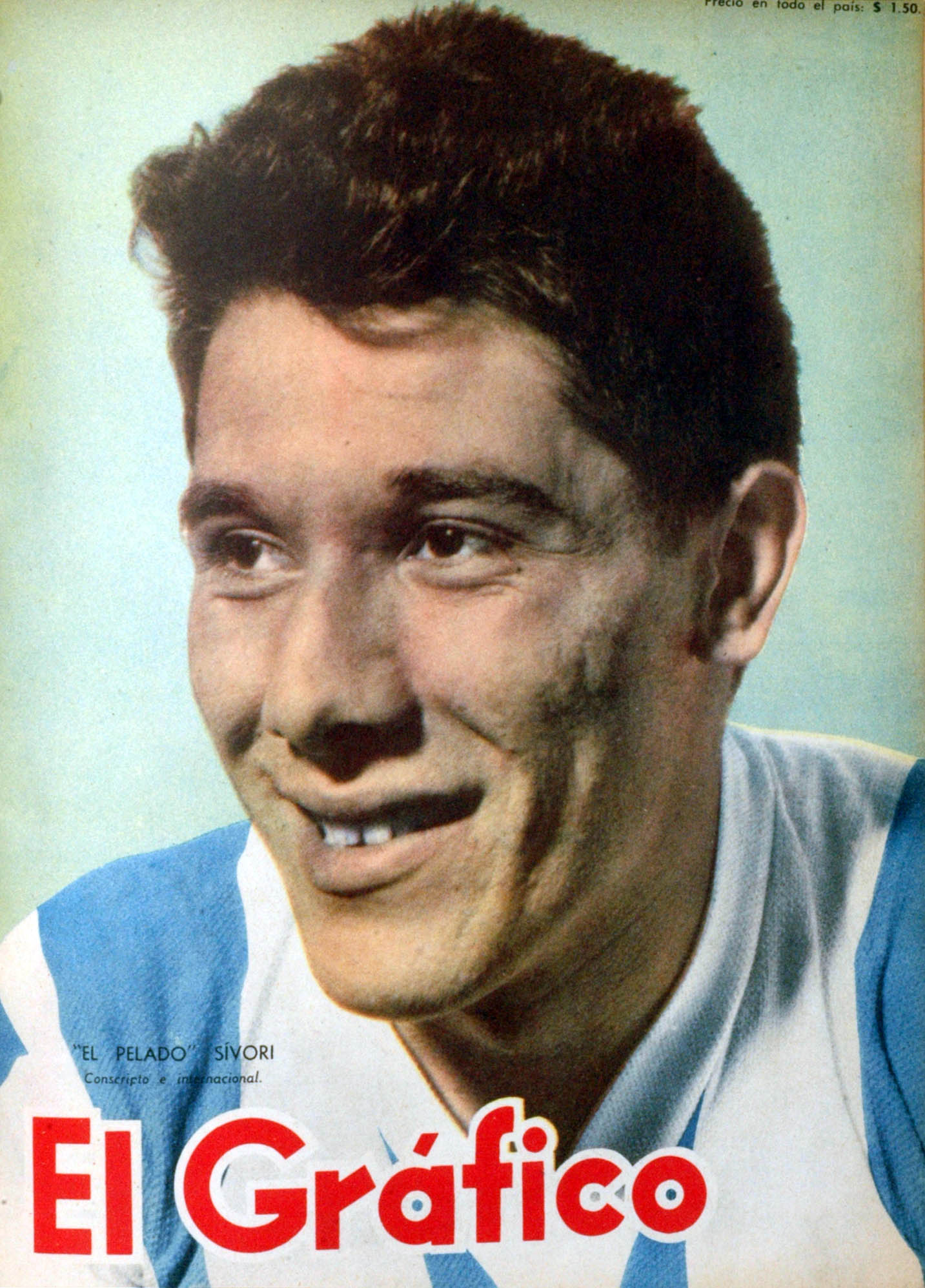
Sívori champion of América with Argentina in 1957

At international level, Sívori defended the Argentina national football team eighteen times and registered nine goals. The Argentine side of the time had a formidable attack with Sívori, Oreste Corbatta, Osvaldo Cruz, Humberto Maschio and Antonio Angelillo. The attacking trio of Sívori, Maschio, and Angelillo were nicknamed the caras sucias, which literally means dirty faces in Spanish; in reference to the film of the same name, and due to way they played the game, like fun, dirty faced, mischievous children.

Sívori defended Argentina to the gold medal 1957 South American Championship in Lima, Peru. Argentina dominated in every game during that year's South American Championship; the team's wins throughout the competition included an 8–2 victory against the Colombia national football team, and a 3–0 victory against close rivals Brazil.

=== Italy ===
Sívori moved to Italy in 1957, along with his compatriots Maschio and Angelillo. The Argentine football association banned the attacking trio from playing for Argentina, and eliminated them from the 1958 World Cup. Sívori's Italian ancestry enabled him to become an Italian citizen. In April 1961 he made his debut for Italy. Along with several other foreign-born Italian players, Sívori played for Italy at the 1962 FIFA World Cup in Chile, where they suffered a first-round elimination. He would earn nine caps and score eight goals while playing for Italy.

== Playing style ==
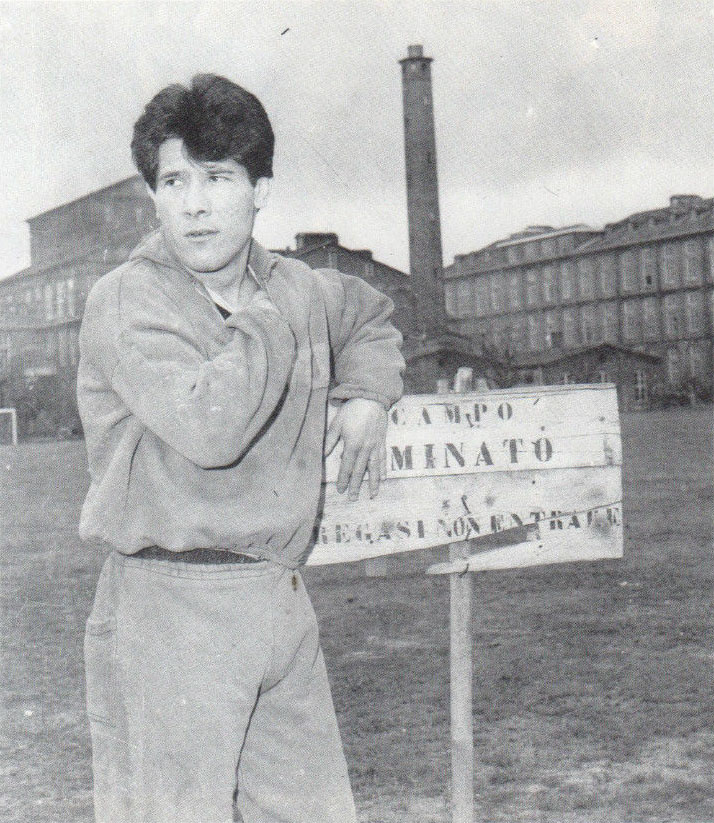
Sívori in training during his years in Turin

Encyclopædia Britannica has described Sívori's playing style as "audacious and brilliant"; a highly talented footballer, he is considered one of Italy's and Juventus's greatest ever players, as well as one of the best players of his generation. Sívori was a quick, diminutive, highly creative, and technically gifted forward, known for his pace on the ball, who used his acceleration, outstanding dribbling skills, flair, and feints to beat opposing defenders; these included turns, flicks, quick changes of direction, and his innovative trademark move: the nutmeg, also known as tunnel, in Italian, which involved him playing the ball between an opponent's legs. He was primarily a left footed player, and was an excellent finisher and a prolific goalscorer, who possessed a powerful and accurate shot from both inside and outside the area, and who had the ability to score not only with his left, but also his right foot and, in spite of his short stature, his head; this would sometimes see him receiving kicks to the face. Despite not being particularly strong, due to his slender physique, Sívori was also known for his tenacity and bravery on the pitch, as well as his professionalism as a footballer, although he also drew criticism at times for his volatile character and unsportsman-like behaviour, which often saw him argue with officials, commit aggressive tackles on his opponents, or attempt "to provoke and to humiliate" other players with his skill on the ball.

Although he was an excellent goalscorer, especially while with Juventus, Sívori was also able to use his vision and passing accuracy to create chances for team-mates, working in unison with Charles and Boniperti in the club's attacking trident, and was capable of playing both in the centre as a main striker and in a deeper role as a second striker or inside forward on the left side of the pitch. Because of his creative playing style, skill, eye for goal, country of birth, hairstyle, strong mentality, and at times rebellious nature both on and off the field, Sívori is often retroactively compared to another left–footed Argentine player who emerged after him: Diego Maradona, with some parts of the media dubbing him "the Maradona of the Sixties".

== Managerial career ==
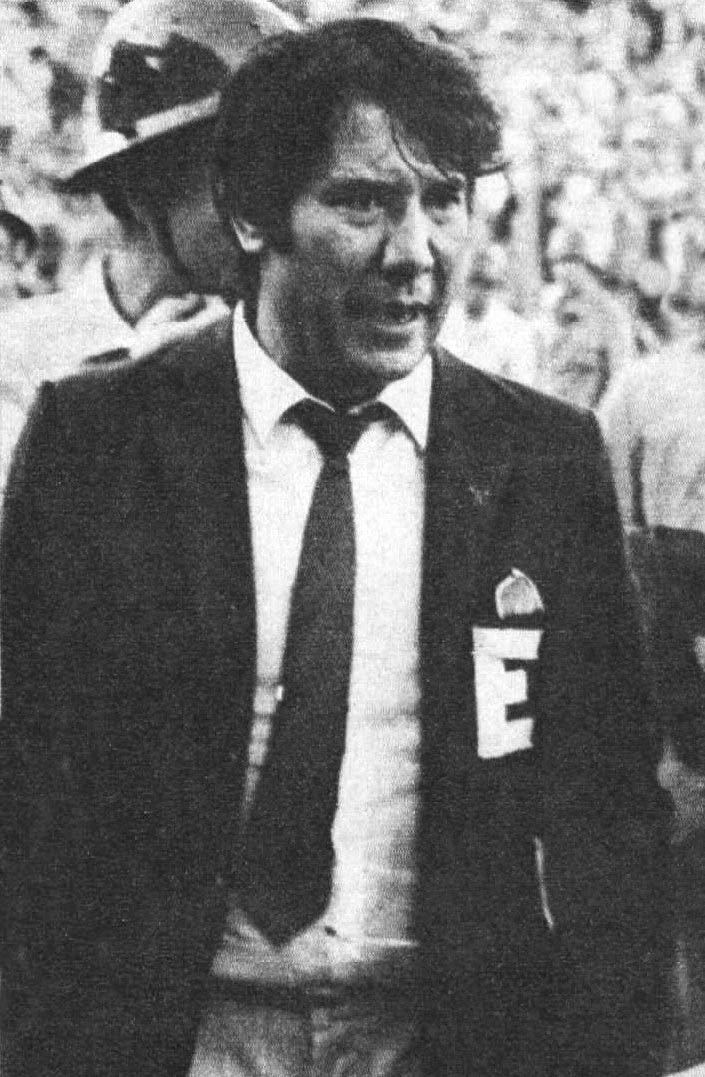
Sívori as manager of Rosario Central, 1969–70

Sívori retired from the playing field in 1969. Although he retired to his native Argentina as a wealthy man, his love for the game meant that he decided to take up a further career as a coach; he coached River Plate, Rosario Central, Estudiantes de La Plata, Racing Club and Vélez Sarsfield.

From 1972 until 1974, Sívori took charge of the Argentina national team, and the team qualified for the 1974 FIFA World Cup. Sívori was the first man to call up Ubaldo Fillol to defend Argentina. Fillol would become one of the most highly regarded keepers in Argentine history. After that he became a full-time scout in South America for Juventus. In 1983, he was the head coach for Toronto Italia in the National Soccer League.

== After retirement ==
In March 2004, Sívori was named by Pelé as one of the top 125 greatest living footballers and honoured as part of the FIFA 100. The following year in February 2005, Sívori died in his hometown of San Nicolás at the age of 69 due to pancreatic cancer.

== Career statistics ==
=== Club ===
Appearances and goals by club, season and competition
Club	Season	League			Cup		Continental		Total	
Club	Season	Division	Apps	Goals	Apps	Goals	Apps	Goals	Apps	Goals
River Plate	1954	Primera División	16	8					16	8
River Plate	1955	Primera División	23	11					23	11
River Plate	1956	Primera División	23	10					23	10
River Plate	1957	Primera División	1	0					1	0
River Plate	Total		63	29					63	29
Juventus	1957–58	Serie A	32	22	8	9	-		40	31
Juventus	1958–59	Serie A	24	15	3	5	2	3	29	23
Juventus	1959–60	Serie A	31	28	4	3	0	0	35	31
Juventus	1960–61	Serie A	27	25	1	2	1	1	29	28
Juventus	1961–62	Serie A	25	13	0	0	5	2	30	15
Juventus	1962–63	Serie A	33	16	4	3	1	1	38	20
Juventus	1963–64	Serie A	28	13	2	1	4	0	34	14
Juventus	1964–65	Serie A	15	3	1	1	3	2	19	6
Juventus	Total		215	135	23	24	16	9	254	168
Napoli	1965–66	Serie A	33	7					33	7
Napoli	1966–67	Serie A	20	2					20	2
Napoli	1967–68	Serie A	7	2					7	2
Napoli	1968–69	Serie A	3	1					3	1
Napoli	Total		63	12					63	12
Career total			341	175	23	24	16	9	380	208

=== International ===
Appearances and goals by national team and year
National team	Year	Apps	Goals
Argentina	1956	13	6
Argentina	1957	6	3
Total		19	9
Italy	1961	5	8
Italy	1962	4	0
Total		9	8

Scores and results list Argentina's and Italy's goal tally first, score column indicates score after each Sívori goal.

List of international goals scored by Omar Sívori
No.	Date	Venue	Opponent	Score	Result	Competition
Argentina goals
1	22 January 1956	Montevideo, Uruguay	Peru		2–1	1956 South American Championship
2	6 March 1956	Mexico City, Mexico	Costa Rica		4–3	1956 Panamerican Championship
3	11 March 1956	Mexico City, Mexico	Chile		3–0	1956 Panamerican Championship
4	18 March 1956	Mexico City, Mexico	Brazil		2–2	1956 Panamerican Championship
5	17 March 1957	Lima, Peru	Ecuador		3–0	1957 South American Championship
6	28 March 1957	Lima, Peru	Chile		6–2	1957 South American Championship
7	6 April 1957	Lima, Peru	Peru		1–2	1957 South American Championship
Italy goals
1	25 April 1961	Bologna, Italy	Northern Ireland		3–2	Friendly
2	24 May 1961	Rome, Italy	England		2–3	Friendly
3	15 June 1961	Florence, Italy	Argentina		4–1	Friendly
4	4 November 1961	Turin, Italy	Israel		6–0	FIFA World Cup 1962 qualification

== Honours ==
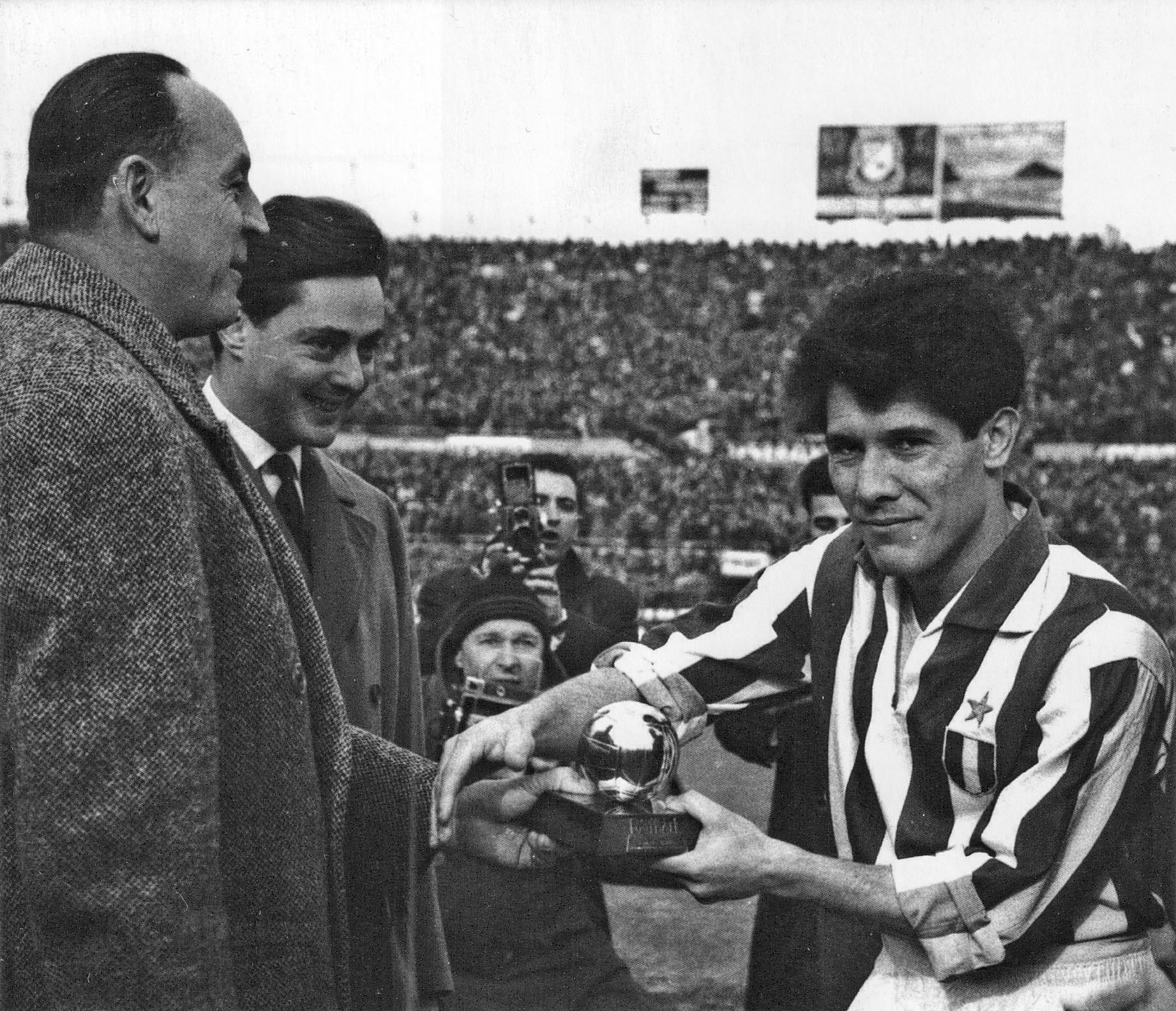
Sívori receives the 1961 Ballon d'Or.

River Plate

- Primera División: 1955, 1956, 1957

Juventus

- Serie A: 1957–58, 1959–60, 1960–61
- Coppa Italia: 1958–59, 1959–60, 1964–65
- Inter-Cities Fairs Cup runner-up: 1964–65
- Coppa delle Alpi: 1963

Napoli

- Coppa delle Alpi: 1966
- Serie A runner-up: 1967–68

Argentina

- South American Championship: 1957
- Panamerican Championship runner-up: 1956

Individual

- Panamerican Championship top scorer: 1956
- South American Championship player of the tournament: 1957
- Capocannoniere: 1959–60
- Ballon d'Or: 1961
- FIFA 100: 2004
- IFFHS Argentina All Times Dream Team (Team B): 2021
- Juventus FC Hall of Fame: 2025

== Filmography ==
Sívori played the part of himself, in two Italian films.

- Idoli controluce – (1965)
- The President of Borgorosso Football Club (1970)

== Quotes ==
- Giampiero Boniperti: "Playing alongside him was pure fun. Charles was the target man, while Omar used the space to put defenders in trouble. He used to play with socks down around his ankles, without any kind of protection, to show he wasn't scared of defenders. He had an incredible winning mentality."
- John Charles: "With Sivori, it was the classic big man-little man partnership. Sivori had huge skill and it was a joy to play with a player as good as he was."
- Marcello Lippi: "Whenever we were talking about Juventus, his eyes brightened up."
- Humberto Maschio: "He was amazing. A first-class dribbler who had speed and the ability to surprise at any moment."
- Roberto Bettega: "He was like an older brother for me. He was my idol when I was a kid and then we became close friends. He was one of the best players in the history of football."

== See also ==
- Oriundo

== Bibliography ==
- Gregori, Claudio (2005). Omar Sivori—La leggenda del Cabezón [Omar Sivori—The legend of Cabezón]. I libri della Gazzetta dello Sport (in Italian). Milan, Italy: RCS Quotidiani. ASIN B00PLY8LOM.
