= Vladislao Cap =

Argentine footballer and manager

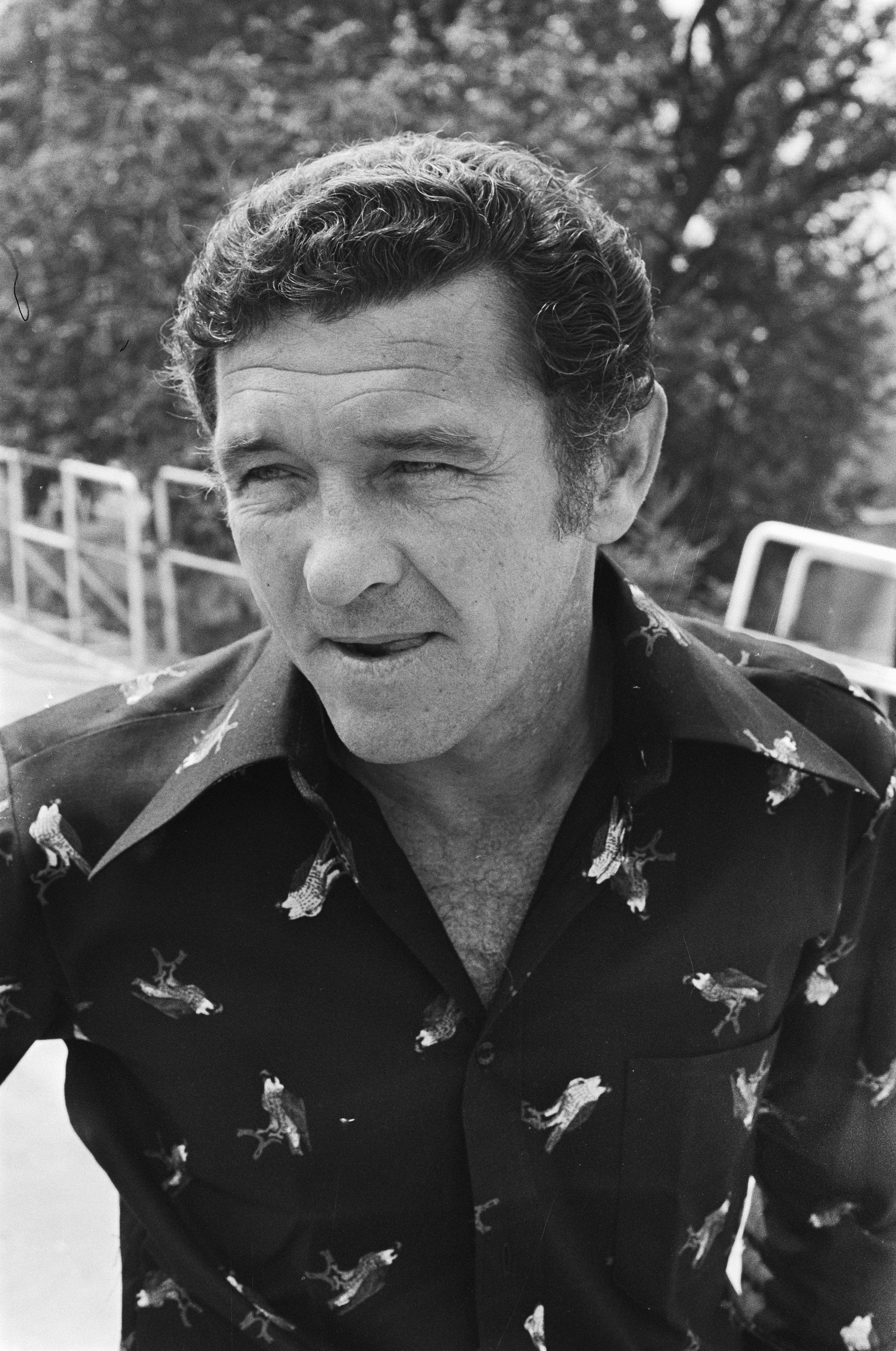
- Cap as manager of Argentina during the 1974 FIFA World Cup

Personal information
- Full name: Vladislao Wenceslao Cap
- Date of birth: 5 July 1934
- Place of birth: Avellaneda, Argentina
- Date of death: 14 September 1982 (aged 48)
- Position: Defender

Senior career*
Years	Team	Apps	(Gls)
1952	Arsenal de Llavallol		
1953	Quilmes		
1954–1960	Racing Club	135	(3)
1961	Huracán	27	(0)
1962–1965	River Plate	91	(1)
1966	Vélez Sársfield	14	(1)
1967	Porvenir Miraflores		

International career
1959–1962	Argentina	11	(1)
- * Club domestic league appearances and goals

Vladislao Wenceslao Cap (5 July 1934 – 14 September 1982) was an Argentine football player and manager. As a player he represented his native country at the 1962 FIFA World Cup in Chile as a defender. Twelve years later he was the manager of the Argentina national football team at the 1974 FIFA World Cup.

== Playing career ==
Cap played for Argentine club sides Arsenal de Llavallol (1952), Quilmes (1953), Racing Club (1954–1960), Club Atlético Huracán (1961), River Plate (1962–1965), Vélez Sársfield (1966) and Porvenir Miraflores (1967).

He played 11 matches with the national team, scoring one goal, and won the 1959 Copa América.

== Managerial career ==
Cap was manager of Ferro Carril Oeste from 1968 to 1969, the Argentina national team for the 1974 world cup (alongside José Varacka), Platense in 1980 and Boca Juniors in 1982, amongst others.

== Personal life ==
Cap was born in Argentina and is of Polish and Hungarian descent. His grandson Éder Borelli is a professional footballer.

== Death ==
Cap was hospitalized with a lung disease in September 1982 and died shortly thereafter.

== Honours ==
=== Player ===
Racing

- Primera División: 1958

Argentina

- Copa América: 1959

=== Manager ===
Independiente

- Primera División: 1971
