= 1961 Ballon d'Or =

Annual association football award event in France

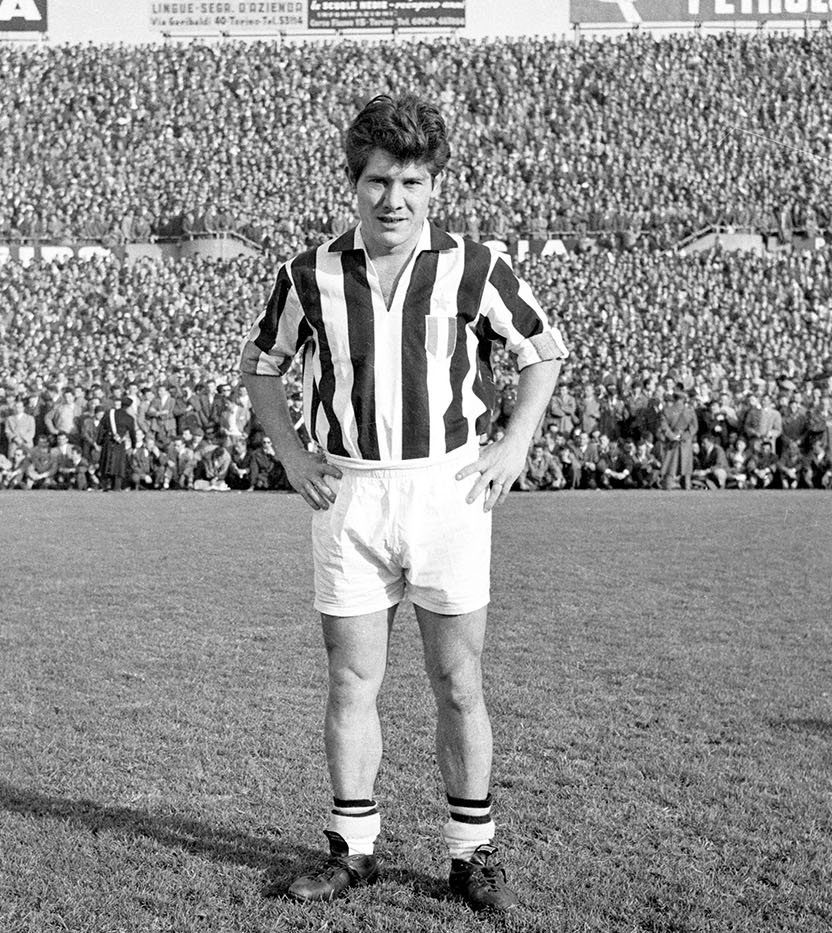
- 1961 Ballon d'Or winner, Omar Sívori
- Date: 12 December 1961
- Location: Paris, France
- Presented by: France Football

Highlights
- Won by: (Italy) Omar Sívori (1st award)
- Website: ballondor.com

The 1961 Ballon d'Or, given to the best football player in Europe as judged by a panel of sports journalists from UEFA member countries, was awarded to Omar Sívori on 12 December 1961.

== Rankings ==
Rank	Name	Club(s)	Nationality	Points
1	Omar Sívori	(Italy) Juventus	Italy (Note: Despite being born in Argentina, Omar Sívori acquired Italian citizenship in 1961, and went on to play for the Italy national team.)	46
2	Luis Suárez	(Spain) Barcelona (Italy) Internazionale	Spain	40
3	Johnny Haynes	(England) Fulham	England	22
4	Lev Yashin	(Soviet Union) Dynamo Moscow	Soviet Union	21
5	Ferenc Puskás	(Spain) Real Madrid	Hungary	16
6	Alfredo Di Stéfano	(Spain) Real Madrid	Spain (Note: Despite being born in Argentina, Alfredo Di Stéfano acquired Spanish citizenship in 1956, and would play for the Spain national team.)	13
6	Uwe Seeler	(West Germany) Hamburger SV	West Germany	13
8	John Charles	(Italy) Juventus	Wales	10
9	Paco Gento	(Spain) Real Madrid	Spain	8
10	José Águas	(Portugal) Benfica	Portugal	5
10	Bobby Charlton	(England) Manchester United	England	5
10	Gyula Grosics	(Hungary) Tatabánya	Hungary	5
10	Gerhard Hanappi	(Austria) Rapid Wien	Austria	5
10	Josef Masopust	(Czechoslovakia) Dukla Prague	Czechoslovakia	5
10	José Santamaría	(Spain) Real Madrid	Spain	5
10	Dragoslav Šekularac	(Socialist Federal Republic of Yugoslavia) Red Star Belgrade	Yugoslavia	5
17	Danny Blanchflower	(England) Tottenham Hotspur	Northern Ireland	4
17	Germano	(Portugal) Benfica	Portugal	4
17	Kurt Hamrin	(Italy) Fiorentina	Sweden	4
17	Mikheil Meskhi	(Soviet Union) Dinamo Tbilisi	Soviet Union	4
17	Viktor Ponedelnik	(Soviet Union) SKA Rostov-on-Don	Soviet Union	4
17	Horst Szymaniak	(West Germany) Karlsruher SC (Italy) Catania	West Germany	4
23	José Augusto	(Portugal) Benfica	Portugal	3
23	Denis Law	(England) Manchester City (Italy) Torino	Scotland	3
23	Slava Metreveli	(Soviet Union) Torpedo Moscow	Soviet Union	3
23	Max Morlock	(West Germany) 1. FC Nürnberg	West Germany	3
23	Horst Nemec	Austria Wien	Austria	3
28	Pierre Bernard	(France) Sedan (France) Nîmes	France	2
28	Gert Dörfel	(West Germany) Hamburger SV	West Germany	2
28	Norbert Eschmann	(France) Stade Français	Switzerland	2
28	Jimmy Greaves	(England) Chelsea (Italy) Milan (England) Tottenham Hotspur	England	2
28	Lucien Muller	(France) Reims	France	2
28	Costa Pereira	(Portugal) Benfica	Portugal	2
28	Lajos Tichy	(Hungary) Budapest Honvéd	Hungary	2
35	Charles Antenen	(Switzerland) La Chaux-de-Fonds	Switzerland	1
35	Mário Coluna	(Portugal) Benfica	Portugal	1
35	Eusébio	(Portugal) Benfica	Portugal	1
35	Gernot Fraydl	Austria Wien	Austria	1
35	Karl Koller	(Austria) First Vienna	Austria	1
35	Rudolf Kučera	(Czechoslovakia) Dukla Prague	Czechoslovakia	1
35	Dumitru Macri	(Romania) Rapid București	Romania	1
35	Jimmy McIlroy	(England) Burnley	Northern Ireland	1
35	Karl Stotz	Austria Wien	Austria	1
