= Oriundo =

Person of foreign descent

The terms oriunda (feminine) and oriundo (masculine) (pronounced [oˈrjundo] (pronounced [oˈrjunda]; Italian plural oriundi) is an Italian and Portuguese noun describing an immigrant in a country, whose ancestry is from that same country. It comes from the Latin verb oriri (orior), "be born", and is etymologically related to Orient.

In Spanish oriundo means native or inhabitant, but this term was also used in Spain to refer to a series of athletes, born in Latin America, whose ancestors were Spanish emigrants. In Italian culture, an oriundo is someone who is living in a country other than the one of his or her origins (i.e. being of Italian descent and residing outside of Italy). Oriundi are usually foreigners to their country of origin in legal terms. Whether or not they maintain cultural and linguistic ties with their country of origin usually depends on their upbringing, family background and preservation of cultural values.

== Overview ==
Some oriundi have played for the Italy or Spain national football teams in international competition; among these are some who had previously represented their native country. FIFA requires international footballers to have either citizenship of a country or close ancestral ties to it. Oriundi may qualify under the latter heading; in addition, they can acquire citizenship more easily than immigrants not of native extraction, owing to jus sanguinis. When the Italian and Spanish leagues imposed quotas or bans on "foreign" players, oriundi were partially or totally exempt from these.

Tours by European club sides of Latin America were common from the 1920s to the 1950s; tours in the reverse direction also occurred. European managers often recruited Latin Americans they had seen playing on these tours. The recruitment of dual internationals was greatly reduced by FIFA which ruled in 1964 that a player could not represent more than one country. In the 1960s, with incidents like the Battle of Santiago in the 1962 FIFA World Cup and several finals of the Intercontinental Cup, South American football came to be seen as more violent and defensive, and hence fewer players were recruited.

== Italian oriundi ==
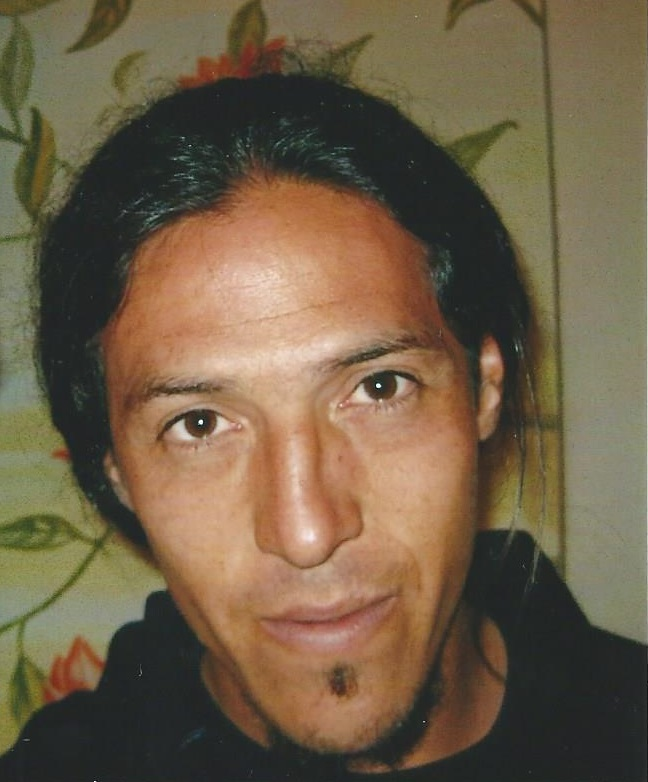
Mauro Camoranesi was born in Argentina and played for Italy due to his ancestry. In 2006, he won the World Cup held in Germany with the Italy national team.

The Italian Americans who "returned" to Italy in the 1920s and '30s were known as rimpatriati ("repatriated people"). In Fascist Italy, they automatically had dual citizenship and had no need to undergo naturalization. Vittorio Pozzo, manager of the Italy national team, selected several for the victorious 1934 FIFA World Cup side. He rebutted critics of this policy by saying "if they can die for Italy, they can play for Italy", a reference to conscription. Enrique Guaita, Scopelli and Stagnaro tried to leave for France to avoid being called up for the Abyssinian campaign in 1936.

Oriundi as a term in Italian football dates from the early 1950s. The category existed separately from native and foreign players at intervals until the 1970s. Omar Sivori, Humberto Maschio and Antonio Valentín Angelillo, the three stars of the Argentina national team that won the 1957 Copa América were signed by Italian clubs and given citizenship, thereby missing Argentina's disappointing showing at the 1958 FIFA World Cup.

In 1966, no new foreigners were admitted to the Italian league. Their presence was blamed for the continued underperformance of the national side, culminating at the humiliating defeat by North Korea at that year's World Cup. The ban was eased when one foreigner per Serie A team was allowed from 1980.

In recent years, the most famous Italian oriundo has been the former Juventus' Italian Argentine footballer Mauro Camoranesi, who was eligible for Italian citizenship through a great-grandfather who in 1873 emigrated from Potenza Picena, in Italy's Marche region, to Argentina. Camoranesi won the 2006 FIFA World Cup with the azzurri.

=== List of Italian football oriundi ===
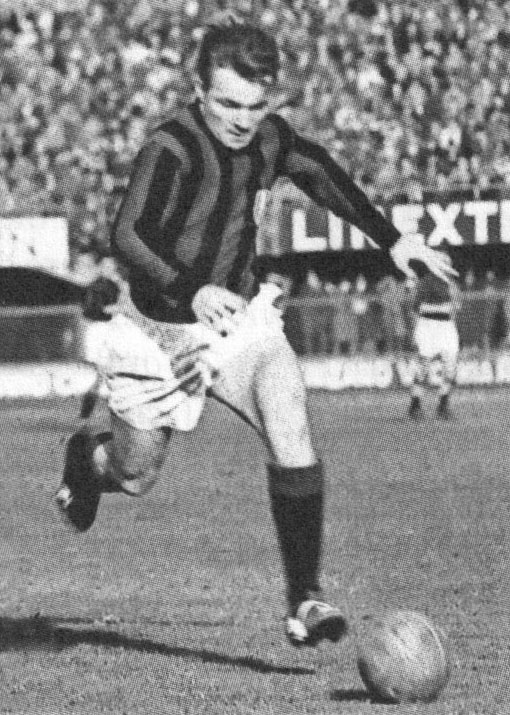
José Altafini playing for Milan

- (Switzerland) – Ermanno Aebi – Inter – 1910–22
- (Brazil) – José Altafini – Milan, Napoli, Juventus – 1958–76
- (Uruguay) – Miguel Andreolo – Bologna, Lazio, Napoli – 1935–48
- (Argentina) – Antonio Angelillo – Inter, Roma, Milan, Lecco – 1957–68
- (Argentina) – Emilio Badini – Bologna, Spal – 1913–22
- (Argentina) – Cristian Battocchio – Udinese – 2010–12
- (Brazil) – Daniel Bessa – Verona, Genoa – 2017–19, 2020–22
- (Argentina) – Mauro Camoranesi – Verona, Juventus – 2000–06, 2007–10
- (Brazil) – Albano Canazza – Como – 1981–82
- (Argentina) – Renato Cesarini – Juventus – 1929–35
- (Argentina) – Arturo Chini Ludueña – Roma – 1927–34
- (Ukraine) – Nikita Contini – Napoli – 2023–24
- (Brazil) – Dino da Costa – Roma, Fiorentina, Atalanta, Juventus – 1955–66
- (Brazil) – Alejandro Demaría – Lazio – 1931–34
- (Argentina) – Paolo Dellafiore – Treviso, Palermo, Torino, Parma, Cesena, Novara, Siena – 2005–13
- (Argentina) – Attilio Demaria – Inter, Novara, Legnano – 1932–36, 1938–46
- (Argentina) – Alfredo Devincenzi – Inter – 1934–36
- (Brazil) – Éder – Empoli, Brescia, Cesena, Sampdoria, Inter – 2006–07, 2010–18
- (Brazil) – Emerson Palmieri – Palermo, Roma – 2014–18
- (Uruguay) – Ricardo Faccio – Inter – 1933–36
- (Brazil) – Otávio Fantoni – Lazio – 1930–35
- (Uruguay) – Francisco Fedullo – Bologna – 1930–39
- (Brazil) – Luiz Felipe – Lazio – 2017–22
- (Uruguay) – Emanuele Figliola – Genoa – 1935–38
- (South Africa) (England) – Eddie Firmani – Sampdoria, Inter, Genoa – 1955–61, 1962–63
- (Argentina) – Enrique Flamini – Lazio – 1939–52, 1953–54
- (Argentina) – Fernando Forestieri – Siena, Udinese – 2007–09, 2020–22
- (Uruguay) – Francesco Frione – Inter – 1932–35
- (Brazil) – Elisio Gabardo – Milan, Liguria, Genoa – 1935–41
- (Uruguay) – Alcides Ghiggia – Roma, Milan – 1953–62
- (Uruguay) – Carlos Gringa – Fiorentina, Lucchese – 1932–39
- (Brazil) – Anfilogino Guarisi – Lazio – 1931–36, 1937–38
- (Brazil) – Paulo Innocenti – Bologna, Napoli – 1924–37
- (Brazil) – Jorginho – Verona, Napoli – 2013–18
- (Argentina) – Julio Libonatti – Torino, Genoa – 1926–36
- (Argentina) – Francisco Lojacono – Vicenza, Fiorentina, Roma, Sampdoria – 1956–65
- (Argentina) – Rinaldo Martino – Juventus – 1949–50
- (Uruguay) – Ernesto Mascheroni – Inter – 1934–36
- (Argentina) – Humberto Maschio – Bologna, Atalanta, Inter, Fiorentina – 1957–66
- (Argentina) – Luis Monti – Juventus – 1930–39
- (Argentina) – Miguel Montuori – Fiorentina – 1956–61
- (Scotland) – Giovanni Moscardini – Lucchese, Pisa, Genoa – 1919–??
- (Brazil) – Thiago Motta – Genoa, Inter – 2008–12
- (United States) – Alfonso Negro – Fiorentina, Napoli – 1934–39
- (Argentina) – Raimundo Orsi – Juventus – 1928–35
- (Argentina) – Dani Osvaldo – Fiorentina, Bologna, Roma, Juventus, Inter – 2007–10, 2011–15
- (Argentina) – Gabriel Paletta – Parma, Milan, Atalanta – 2010–17
- (Argentina) – Bruno Pesaola – Roma, Novara, Napoli, Genoa – 1947–61
- (Uruguay) – Cecilio Pisano – Sampdoria – 1937–38, 1939–40, 1941–43
- (Uruguay) – Roberto Porta – Inter – 1934–36
- (Uruguay) – Ettore Puricelli – Bologna, Milan – 1938–49
- (France) – Vincenzo Rennella – Cesena – 2011–12
- (Argentina) – Eduardo Ricagni – Juventus, Milan, Torino – 1953–58
- (Argentina) – Humberto Rosa – Sampdoria, Padova, Juventus, Napoli – 1954–64
- (Paraguay) – Attila Sallustro – Napoli – 1925–37
- (Paraguay) – Oreste Sallustro – Napoli, Bari – 1929–33, 1934–37
- (Uruguay) – Raffaele Sansone – Bologna, Napoli – 1931–46
- (Brazil) – Fabiano Santacroce – Napoli, Parma – 2007–13, 2014–15
- (Argentina) – Ezequiel Schelotto – Cesena, Catania, Atalanta, Inter, Sassuolo, Parma, Chievo – 2010–15, 2018–19
- (Uruguay) – Juan Alberto Schiaffino – Milan, Roma – 1954–62
- (Argentina) – Alessandro Scopelli – Roma – 1933–35
- (Brazil) – Pedro Sernagiotto – Juventus – 1932–34
- (Argentina) – Omar Sívori – Juventus, Napoli – 1957–69
- (Brazil) – Angelo Sormani – Mantova, Roma, Sampdoria, Milan, Napoli, Fiorentina, Vicenza – 1961–76
- (Brazil) – Rafael Toloi – Roma, Atalanta – 2013–14, 2015–25
- (Uruguay) – Victor Tortora – Venezia – 1939–43, 1946–47
- (Uruguay) – Ulisse Uslenghi – Livorno, Napoli – 1933–38
- (Australia) – Cristian Volpato – Roma, Sassuolo – 2021–24, 2025–present
- (England) – Giuseppe Wilson – Lazio – 1969–79
- (Brazil) – Maximo Zenildo Zappino – Frosinone – 2015–16

=== Italian rugby oriundi ===
The number of Argentines playing rugby in Italy has increased since the sport embraced professionalism in 1995, while the Argentine league system remains amateur. (Professionals, however, including those based in Europe, are eligible to play for the Argentina national team, and the country's national federation has created a domestic professional player pool for the national team; see also Pampas XV and Jaguares (Super Rugby).) Italian rugby also allows naturalized foreigners. Restrictions on changing nationality are less strict in rugby than in soccer, and three years' residency qualifies. Oriundi capped by the Italy national team include:

Name	Original country/countries
Rodolfo Ambrosio	Argentina
Matías Agüero	Argentina
David Bortolussi	France
Gonzalo Canale	Argentina
Pablo Canavosio	Argentina
Martín Castrogiovanni	Argentina
Oscar Collodo	Switzerland
Carlo Del Fava	South Africa
Santiago Dellapè	Argentina
Diego Domínguez	Argentina
Mark Giacheri	Australia
Tito Lupini	South Africa
Ramiro Martínez	Argentina
Luke McLean	Australia
Carlos Nieto	Argentina
Luciano Orquera	Argentina
Sergio Parisse	Argentina
Aaron Persico	New Zealand
Ramiro Pez	Argentina
Matt Pini	Australia
Federico Pucciariello	Argentina
Josh Sole	New Zealand
Marko Stanojevic	England / Serbia
Laurent Travini	France
Nick Zisti	Australia
Dario Chistolini	South Africa

=== List of Italian basketball oriundi ===
- (Argentina) - Pablo Albertinazzi - Rieti, San Severo, Catanzaro, Cagliari, Corato, Maddaloni, Capo d’Orlando - 2001-03, 2005–11
- (Switzerland) - Patrick Baldassarre - Treviso, College Italia, Treviglio, Lago Maggiore, Sassari, Scafati, Fortitudo Bologna, Trapani, Reggio Calabria - 2002–present.
- (Argentina) - Pablo Bertone - Pesaro, Varese- 2017–present.
- (United States) - Anthony Binetti - Fortitudo Bologna, Castelletto Ticino, Cantù, Brindisi, Sassari, Veroli - 2006-07, 2008–13
- (France) - Yann Bonato - Pesaro, Reggio Emilia - 1997-99
- (United States) - George Bucci - Siena, Fortitudo Bologna, Montecatini - 1977-92
- (United States) - Ryan Bucci - Ozzano, Ragusa, Osimo, Soresina, Juvi Cremona, Barcellona Pozzo di Gotto, Ferentino, Ferrara, Agrigento - 2003-17
- (Argentina) - Sebastián Cacciola - Roseto, Montecatini, Sassari, Taranto, Napoli, Rimini - 2003-04, 2005, 2005–08, 2009
- (United States) - Dante Calabria - Livorno, Trieste, Treviso, Cantù, Milano, Fortitudo, Soresina, Sant’Antimo - 1996-97, 2000–01, 2002–09, 2010.
- (Argentina) - Juan Marcos Casini - Jesi, Cantù, Pistoia, Scafati, Napoli, Ferentino, Casale, Reggio Calabria, Ravenna, Recanati, Rieti - 2003-08, 2009–present.
- (Argentina) - Óscar Chiaramello - San Severo, Osimo, Montegranaro, Pistoia, Recanati, Stamura - 1999-01, 2000–01, 2001–02, 2002–03, 2003–13
- (Argentina) - Albano Chiarastella - Bernalda, Potenza, Massafra, Agrigento, Biella - 2006–present
- (United States) - David Chiotti - Casale, Milano, Brindisi - 2009-14
- (United States) - Matt Costello - Avellino - 2018–present
- (United States) - Mike D'Antoni - Milano as player - 1977-90 - Milano, Treviso as coach - 1990-97, 2001–02
- (Brazil) - Enrico de Carli - Mazzini Bologna, Varese, Cantù - 1958-60, 1963–65
- (Malta) - Samuel Deguara - Treviso, Caorle, Bari, Reggio Emilia - 2007-13
- (Argentina) - Carlos Delfino - Reggio Calabria, Fortitudo Bologna, Torino - 2000-04, 2018–present
- (United States) - Vinny del Negro - Treviso, Fortitudo Bologna - 1990-92, 1999
- (United States) - Ross DeRogatis - Capo d'Orlando - 2007
- (Argentina) - Agustín Fabi - Patti, Treviglio, Reggio Calabria, Treviso - 2010–present.
- (Argentina) - Juan Manuel Fabi - Castellano Massafra, Capo d’Orlando, Imola - 2003-09
- (Argentina) - Daniel Farabello - Varese, Ferrara - 2003-06, 2007-11.
- (Argentina) - Ariel Filloy - Sassari, Rimini, Milano, Soresina, Scafati, Pistoia, Trieste, Reggio Emilia, Venezia, Avellino - 2003–present
- (Argentina) - Demián Filloy - Porto Torres, Rimini, Montegranaro, Reggio Emilia, Trapani, Roma - 2002-14, 2015–17, 2018-present.
- (Uruguay) - Bruno Fitipaldo - Capo d’Orlando, Avellino - 2016, 2017–present
- (Argentina) - Toto Forray - Messina, Padova, Jesolo, Forlì, Trento - 2003–present.
- (France) - Frédéric Forte - Avellino, Scafati - 2003-05
- (Argentina) - Roberto Gabini - Rimini, Roma, Napoli, Jesi - 2003-04, 2007–10
- (United States) - Anthony Gennari - Varese, Forlì, Pall.Milano, Venezia, Rieti - 1964-76
- (Argentina) - Mario Ghersetti - Porto Torres, Veroli, Vigevano, Brescia, Verona, Ferentino, Reggio Calabria, Bergamo, Orzinuovi - 2001-13, 2014–present.
- (Argentina) - Nicolás Gianella - Reggio Calabria, Scafati, Cantù - 2000-01, 2002–03, 2011–12
- (Argentina) - Mario Gigena - Livorno, Jesi, Varese, Milano, Rieti, Veroli, Ostuni, Fabriano, Recanati, Don Bosco Livorno, Piombino, Labronica Livorno, Cecina - 1995-2012, 2013–present.
- (Argentina) - Silvio Gigena - Livorno, Virtus Bologna, Milano, Pesaro, Udine, Scafati, Soresina, Fortitudo Bologna, Massafra, Ostuni, Bari, Libertas Livorno - 1995-2013
- (Argentina) - Manu Ginóbili - Reggio Calabria, Virtus Bologna - 1998-02
- (United States) - Anthony Giovacchini - Avellino, Roseto, Montecatini, Virtus Bologna, Reggio Calabria, Casale, Fabriano, Napoli, Milano, Cantù, Brindisi, Veroli - 2002-12
- (Brazil) - Guilherme Giovannoni - Rimini, Biella, Treviso, Virtus Bologna - 2002-04, 2005–06, 2005–09
- (Canada) - Peter Guarasci - Pesaro, Roseto, Rimini, Reggio Emilia - 1996-99, 2000–01, 2002–08
- (United States) - Mike Iuzzolino - Verona, Roma, Milano, Pavia - 1995-01, 2002–03
- (United States) - Antonio Maestranzi - Reggio Calabria, Jesi, Montegranaro, Roma - 2006-2012
- (Uruguay) - Nicolás Mazzarino - Reggio Calabria, Cantù - 2001-13
- (United States) - Phil Melillo - Lazio, Treviso, Rieti, Roma as player - 1976-77, 1983-86 - Forlì, Verona, Siena, Roseto, Udine, Pesaro, Novara, Montecatini as coach - 1994-04, 2005–07, 2008–09, 2012-13
- (United States) - Alex Mitola - Ceglie - 2016-17
- (Argentina) - Alejandro Montecchia - Reggio Calabria, Milano - 1999-03, 2006
- (Brazil) - Paulo César Motta - Roseto, Trapani, Brindisi, Ostuni, Corato, Ceglie - 2001, 2002–13, 2014
- (Uruguay) - Alejandro Muro - Scafati, Palestrina, Novara, Montegranaro, Casale, Firenze, Brindisi, Latina, Fortitudo Bologna - 2001, 2001–10
- (Argentina) - Bernardo Musso - Pergamino, Licata, Alghero, Olbia, Fossombrone, Udine, Brescia, Perugia, Napoli, Forlì, Pesaro, Ferentino, Treviso - 2002-15, 2016–present.
- (United States) - Mike Nardi - Napoli, Montecatini, Avellino, Pesaro, Pavia, Milano, Forlì, Mantova, Latina - 2007-12, 2013–15
- (United States) - Ryan Pettinella - Montegranaro, Veroli, Recanati - 2008-09, 2013–14
- (Argentina) - Antonio Porta - Imola, Livorno, Biella, Avellino, Verona, Scafati, Udine - 2002-07, 2008–13, 2016
- (United States) - Anthony Raffa - Roma, Orzinuovi - 2016-17, 2017
- (Argentina) - Nicolás Richotti - Bari, Agropoli, Rovigo - 2005-08
- (United States) - Mason Rocca - Jesi, Napoli, Milano, Virtus Bologna - 2001-15
- (United States) - Joel Salvi - Jesi, Imola, Scafati, Ferrara, Vigevano, Reggio Emilia - 2004-11
- (United States) - Matt Santangelo - Cantù, Rieti, Treviso - 2000-01, 2005–06
- (United States) - Brian Scalabrine - Treviso - 2011
- (Argentina) - Germán Scarone - Treviso, Cervia, Rimini, Montecatini, Siena, Virtus Bologna, Pesaro, Reggio Calabria, Rimini, Piacenza, Monsummano, Bellaria - 1993–present.
- (France) - Laurent Sciarra - Treviso - 1997-98
- (Argentina) - Hugo Sconochini - Reggio Calabria, Milano, Roma, Virtus Bologna, Piacentina, Segrate, Monticelli - 1990-96, 1997-01, 2002–12
- (Brazil) - Jonathan Tavernari - Biella, Pistoia, Scafati, Tortona, Agropoli, Siena, Sassari - 2011-13, 2014–present.
- (United States) - Joe Trapani - Casale, Forlì - 2011-12
- (Canada) - Marc Trasolini - Pesaro, Avellino, Agropoli - 2013-16
- (Slovenia) - Marko Verginella - Udine, Reggio Calabria, Fabriano, Rieti, Sassari - 2004-08
- (United States) - Jeff Viggiano - Pavia, Milano, Biella, Treviso, Brindisi, Siena, Venezia - 2008-17
- (Paraguay) - Bruno Zanotti - Reggio Emilia, Jesi - 2006-07

== Spanish oriundos ==
Few South Americans played football in Spain before World War II. Spain under General Franco allowed for dual nationality with Latin American countries from 1954. Players such as Alfredo Di Stéfano, José Santamaría and Héctor Rial quickly transferred, and helped make Real Madrid the dominant club of the early years of the European Cup. In 1962, the Spanish League banned all foreign players, as their presence was blamed for the poor performance of the national team. Oriundi were allowed if they had not been capped by their native country. As a result, clubs were anxious to prove Spanish ancestry for would-be imports, resulting in some dubious cases. Some players obtained forged birth certificates, providing spurious Spanish ancestors. This was easy in Paraguay during the corrupt dictatorship of Alfredo Stroessner. Consequent scandals emerged at various times, including one exposed by FC Barcelona in 1972. In 1973, to reduce the incentive for corruption, up to two non-oriundi foreigners were allowed per team. Nevertheless, the recruiting of Latin American players continued so strong the Argentine FA in preparation for hosting the 1978 FIFA World Cup forbade its preliminary squad of 40 from moving abroad, lest they be "poached". Spain reduced the number of oriundi to one per team after another forgery scandal in 1979. From 1979 to 1982, no Argentines were allowed abroad, and many like Mario Kempes returned home.

Real Madrid legend Alfredo Di Stéfano is a notable example; he was born in Argentina and played for the Argentina national team, but later obtained Spanish citizenship and represented Spain at the 1962 FIFA World Cup.

== See also ==
- Grannygate
- Haigui
- List of naturalised Spanish international football players
