= Max Aebi =

Swiss-Canadian spine surgeon and journal editor

Max Aebi (born 1948 in Berne) is a Swiss-Canadian spine surgeon.

== Career ==
Aebi is founder and former Chief of the University of Bern Spine Unit, the first academic spine unit in Switzerland. He is Chair of Orthopedic Surgery at McGill University in Montreal, Canada, and Orthopedic Surgeon-in-Chief of the McGill University Health Center.

=== Academic work ===
In 1991, he co-founded the European Spine Journal where he acted as Editor-in-Chief for 23 years, and continues today as Deputy Editor of Web-Based Learning. He is currently Co-Ordinating Editor of eccElearning – an online spine surgery education programme.

Aebi has authored or co-authored over 250 articles, reviews, book chapters and editorials.

=== Involvement in the Cadisc-L scandal ===
Max Aebi chaired the scientific advisory committee of the Cambridge-based Ranier Technology where he contributed to the development of the Cadisc-L spinal prosthesis. A much smaller customised version had been tested on monkeys in 2008. The scientific advisory committee agreed to test the implant on 30 patients. The plastic discs were approved for sale by the British Standards Institution (BSI) after the completion of these tests. An internal Ranier Technology report indicates that the results of the tests were analysed by the scientific advisory board. Ranier Technology was also granted CE (Conformité Européenne) safety marks for the Cadisc-L implant, as well as for another implant, Cadisc-C. After the BSI and CE approval, Aebi implanted the prosthesis with 7 patients in his own practice. In March 2014, after various reports of disintegrating disks, Ranier Technology withdrew the defective prosthesis from the market. In an interview on 29 November 2018, Max Aebi believed that none of his 7 patients were affected, as none of them had come forward at such time. At a later date, one of the patients alleged to have had problems with the implant. However, none of the other 7 patients had any persistent symptoms. In Germany, a case against another doctor was filed late 2018 alleging assault against 53 patients who had the device implanted. In January 2023 the prosecution filed a case against Aebi alleging assault in Switzerland.

=== Humanitarian involvement ===
Aebi spends time in humanitarian work in areas such as Pakistan and Armenia. He was involved in the rescue organisation of paralysed victims of the 2006 earthquake in Pakistan. Subsequently, he helped build the first national spine department in Pakistan, at the National Armed Forces Medical School in Rawalpindi. His work at the Pediatric Hospital in Yerevan, Armenia, has focused on spinal deformities in children, leading him to create a field study about the aetiology of congenital scoliosis.

=== Honors ===
Aebi is recipient of both the AO Innovation Award, the AO Lifetime Achievement Award and the International Society for Study of the Lumbar Spine Lifetime Achievement Award.

=== Memberships ===
Aebi is a former president of the Spine Society of Europe and a Member of the European Academy of Sciences.
