= Aeby =

Aeby is a Swiss-German surname, derived from the personal name Adalbert (Albert). Notable people with the surname include:

- Christoph Theodor Aeby (1835–1885), Swiss anatomist and anthropologist
- Georges Aeby (1913–1999), Swiss footballer
- Jack Aeby (1923–2015), American engineer
- Paul Aeby (1910–?), Swiss footballer
- Philipp Aeby (born 1968), Swiss businessman

== See also ==
- Aebi, similar name
