= Humberto Maschio =

Argentine-Italian footballer (1933–2024)

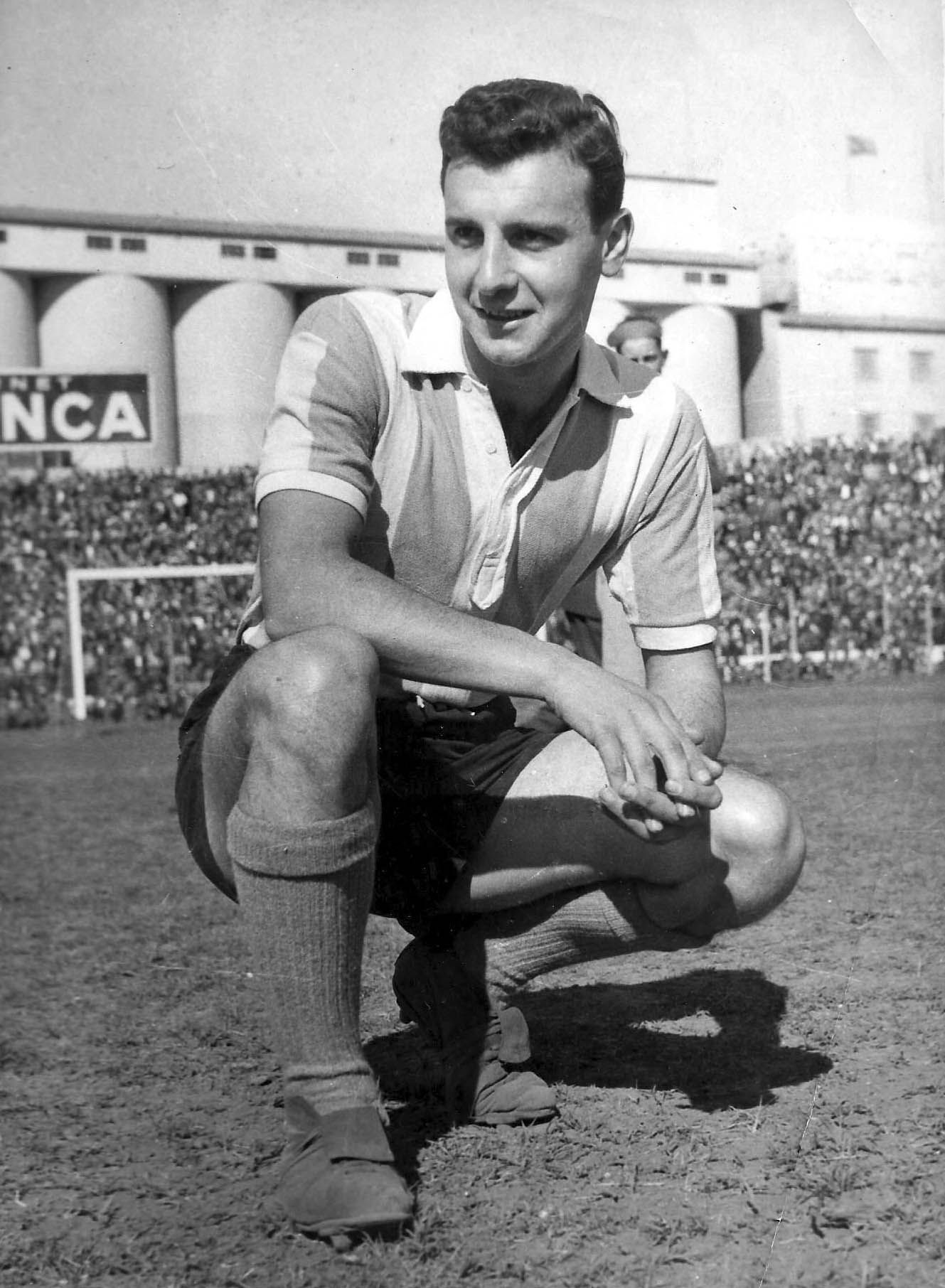
- Maschio during his first years in Racing, c. 1954–57

Personal information
- Full name: Humberto Dionisio Maschio
- Date of birth: 20 February 1933
- Place of birth: Avellaneda, Buenos Aires Province, Argentina
- Date of death: 20 August 2024 (aged 91)
- Height: 1.77 m (5 ft 10 in)
- Positions: Forward; midfielder

Youth career
- Arsenal de Llavallol

Senior career*
Years	Team	Apps	(Gls)
1953	Quilmes		
1954–1957	Racing Club	92	(28)
1957–1959	Bologna	43	(13)
1959–1962	Atalanta	80	(22)
1962–1963	Internazionale	15	(4)
1963–1966	Fiorentina	40	(11)
1966–1968	Racing Club	47	(16)

International career
1956–1957	Argentina	12	(12)
1962	Italy	4	(0)

Managerial career
- 1969: Argentina
- 1971: Racing Club
- 1972: Costa Rica
- 1973: Independiente
- 1982: LDU Quito
- 1985: Blooming
- 1999-2000: Racing Club (Joint with Gustavo Costas)
Medal record
Men's Football
Representing Argentina
South American Football Championship
Winner	1957 Peru
- * Club domestic league appearances and goals

Humberto Dionisio Maschio (Italian pronunciation: [ˈmaskjo]; 20 February 1933 – 20 August 2024) was an Argentine-Italian football player and manager who played as a forward or midfielder.

At international level, he represented both the Argentina national team, winning the 1957 Copa América, and the Italy national team, taking part in the 1962 FIFA World Cup.

Maschio was the playmaker of the Racing team that won the Copa Libertadores and Copa Intercontinental in 1967, being also regarded as a legendary player in the history of the club.

== Club career ==
Maschio started playing at Arsenal de Llavallol to later move to Quilmes Atlético Club where he proved himself a prolific goal-scorer. He joined Racing Club in 1954 and was part of the Argentina national team that won the 1957 South American Championship. That team, and its forward line in particular, was nicknamed The Angels with Dirty Faces (a reference to the then-celebrated Angels with Dirty Faces movie) due to both their irreverent style of play as well as to their less than rigorous attitude to training. The nickname followed Maschio when he, along with fellow national team forwards Antonio Valentín Angelillo and Omar Sívori, moved from Argentina to play football in Italy after the tournament. There, the trio was also known as The Trio of Death due to their clinical ability in scoring goals.

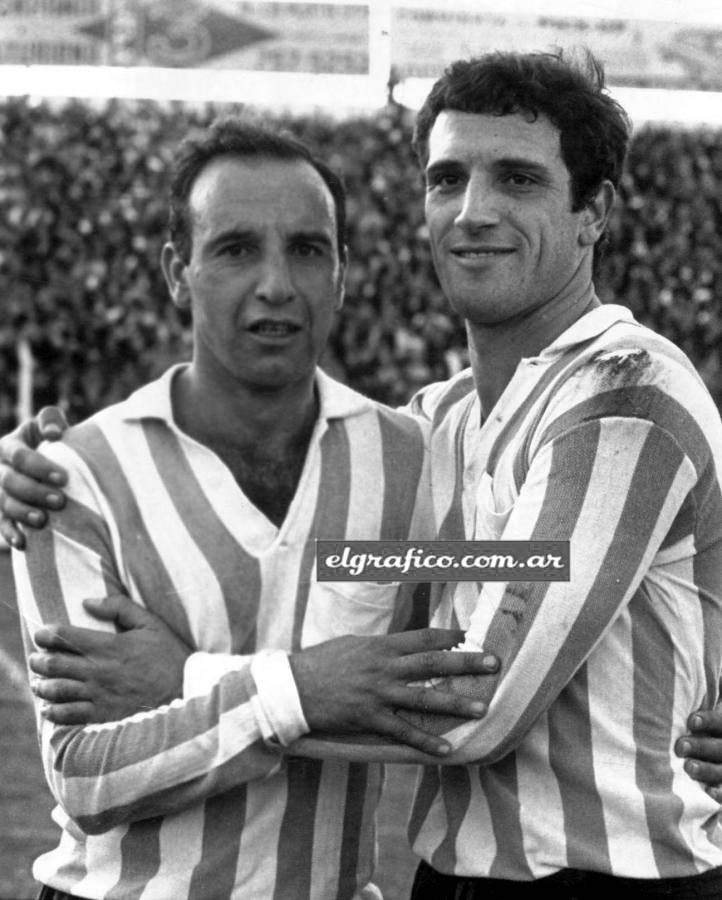
Maschio with Alfio Basile in Racing Club

Maschio had originally been linked with a move to Juventus in 1956, but their interest cooled following the international between Italy and Argentina in Buenos Aires that year when he looked ineffective. Instead he signed for Bologna in 1957, but although he paired up with Bernard Vukas there, he was unable to recreate the form he showed at Racing.

From Bologna Maschio moved to Atalanta, who bought a half-share in him during the 1959–60 season. In Bergamo Maschio regained the form that had taken him to international prominence scoring heavily, and creating numerous chances for his colleagues. At Atalanta Maschio moved from playing as central striker to a deeper role which allowed him to use his vision and creativity. So impressive was his form at Atalanta that he moved to Inter Milan in 1962. However, Maschio failed to fit in with manager Helenio Herrera who used him as a central striker and his time in Milan was of limited success. Following his time at Inter, Maschio briefly played with Fiorentina. His performance brought him to the Italy national team to play in the 1962 FIFA World Cup.

He returned to Racing in 1966 to win the Copa Libertadores and the Intercontinental Cup in 1967. He finished his career with the Avellaneda side with 44 goals in 139 matches.

== International career ==
=== Argentina ===
Maschio played 12 games for the Argentina national team between 1956 and 1957, scoring 12 goals. He helped Argentina to win the 1957 Copa América, and was the top scorer of the tournament with 9 goals.

=== Italy ===
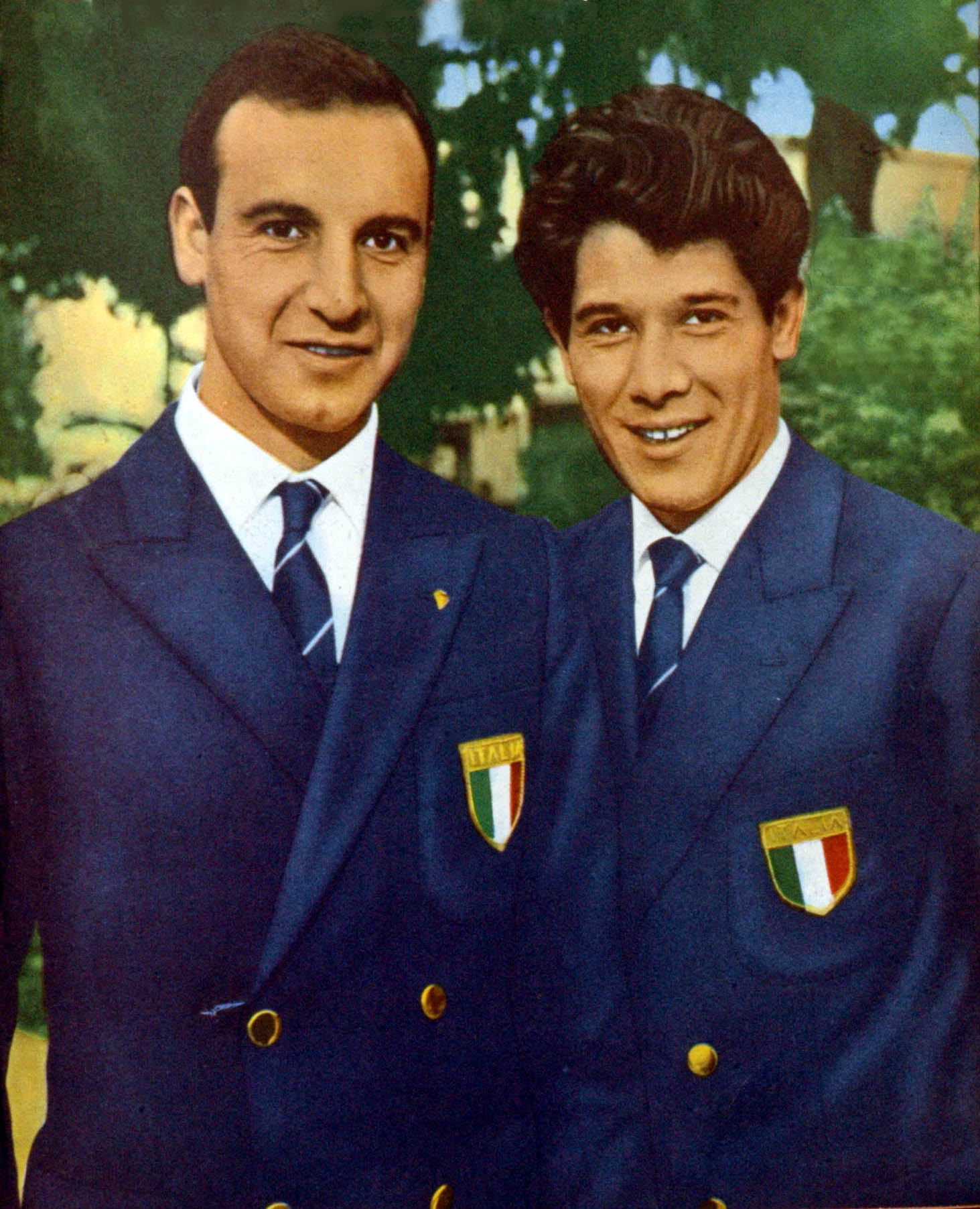
Maschio (left) with Omar Sívori in 1962

Following Maschio's move to Italy, along with his compatriots Sívori and Angelillo, the trio were banned from playing for the Argentina national team by the Argentine Football Federation, and missed out on the 1958 World Cup. Thanks to his Italian ancestry (from Godiasco, in the province of Pavia), Maschio was later also able to play two games for the Italian team in 1962, scoring no goals. In the 1962 World Cup played in Chile, Maschio was the captain of the Italian team and one of the protagonists of the infamous Battle of Santiago incidents in the match against the Chilean host team, in which Chilean player Leonel Sánchez broke his nose with a left hook; Italy lost the match 2–0, and were eliminated in the first round.

== Managerial career ==
Maschio coached the Argentina national team in the first half of 1969 and the Costa Rica national team 1972. He also had a short spell with Bolivian side Blooming in the 1985 Copa Libertadores.

== Death ==
Maschio died from kidney failure on 20 August 2024, at the age of 91.

== Honours ==
=== Player ===
Internazionale

- Serie A: 1962–63

Fiorentina

- Coppa Italia: 1965–66
- Mitropa Cup: 1966

Racing Club

- Primera División: 1966
- Copa Libertadores: 1967
- Intercontinental Cup: 1967

Argentina

- Copa América: 1957
- Pan American Games: 1955

=== Individual ===
- Copa América top scorers: 1957

=== Coach ===
Independiente

- Copa Interamericana: 1972
- Copa Libertadores: 1973

== See also ==
- Oriundo
- List of Argentine born footballers to play for other national teams
