= Antonio Angelillo =

Italian Argentine footballer (1937–2018)

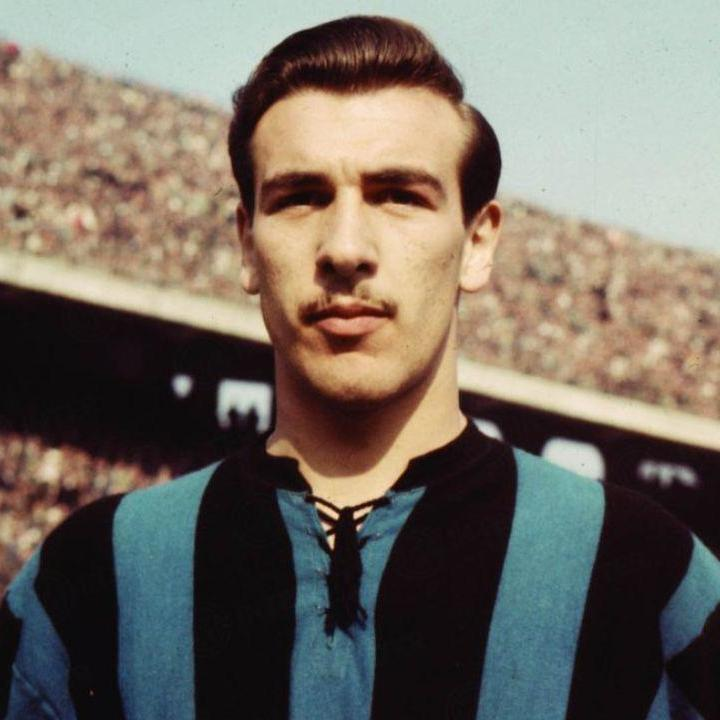
- Angelillo as captain of Inter Milan

Personal information
- Full name: Antonio Valentín Angelillo
- Date of birth: 13 September 1937
- Place of birth: Buenos Aires, Argentina
- Date of death: 5 January 2018 (aged 80)
- Place of death: Siena, Italy
- Height: 1.78 m (5 ft 10 in)
- Positions: Inside forward; midfielder

Youth career
- 1952–1955: Arsenal de Llavallol

Senior career*
Years	Team	Apps	(Gls)
1955	Racing	9	(3)
1956–1957	Boca Juniors	34	(16)
1957–1961	Internazionale	113	(68)
1961–1965	Roma	106	(27)
1965–1966	AC Milan	11	(1)
1966–1967	Lecco	12	(1)
1967–1968	AC Milan	3	(1)
1968–1969	Genoa	22	(5)
1969–1971	Angelana	–	(–)
Total		310	(122)

International career
1955–1957	Argentina	11	(11)
1960–1962	Italy	2	(1)

Managerial career
- 1971–1972: Montevarchi
- 1972–1973: Chieti
- 1973–1974: Campobasso
- 1974–1975: Rimini
- 1975–1977: Brescia
- 1977–1978: Reggina
- 1978–1979: Pescara
- 1980–1984: Arezzo
- 1984–1985: Avellino
- 1985: Palermo
- 1987: Mantova
- 1988: Arezzo
- 1988–1989: Avellino
- 1988–1990: AS FAR
- 1989–1990: Morocco
- 1991–1992: Torres
- 1994: Provincial Osorno
- * Club domestic league appearances and goals

Antonio Valentín Angelillo (Italian pronunciation: [andʒeˈlillo]; 5 September 1937 – 5 January 2018) was an Italian Argentine football forward who played the majority of his professional career in the Italian Serie A; he was a member of both the Argentine and the Italy national teams.

== Club career ==
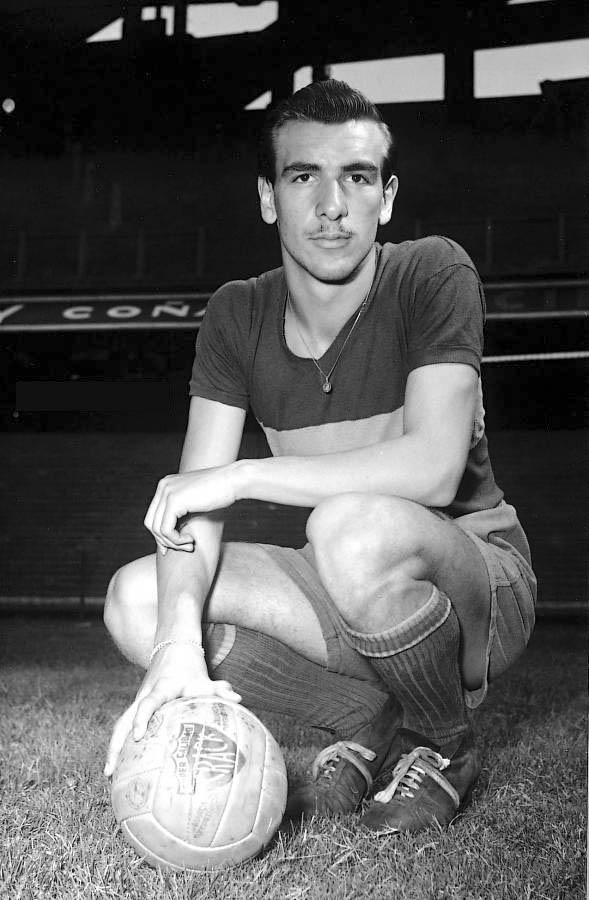
Angelillo in Boca Juniors, c. 1956

Born in Buenos Aires, Angelillo started playing professionally in Arsenal de Llavallol in 1952. In 1955 he played with Racing Club de Avellaneda and moved to Boca Juniors in 1956.

Angelillo was part of the Argentina national team that won the 1957 South American Championship. That team, and its forward line in particular, was nicknamed The Angels with Dirty Faces (a reference to the then-celebrated Angels with Dirty Faces movie) due to both their irreverent style of play as well as to their less than rigorous attitude to training. The nickname followed Angelillo when he, along with fellow national team forwards Omar Sívori and Humberto Maschio, moved from Argentina to play football in Italy after the tournament. There, the trio was also known as The Trio of Death due to their clinical ability in scoring goals.

In 1957 Angelillo was signed by the Italian club Internazionale by the club's president at the time, Angelo Moratti; he made his Serie A debut with the club on 8 September 1957, in a 0–0 home draw against Torino, and scored 16 goals in his first season. From 1957 to 1961, he played 127 games with the Nerazzurri, scoring 77 times. In Serie A, he appeared in 113 matches and scored 68 goals for Internazionale, also serving as the club's captain.

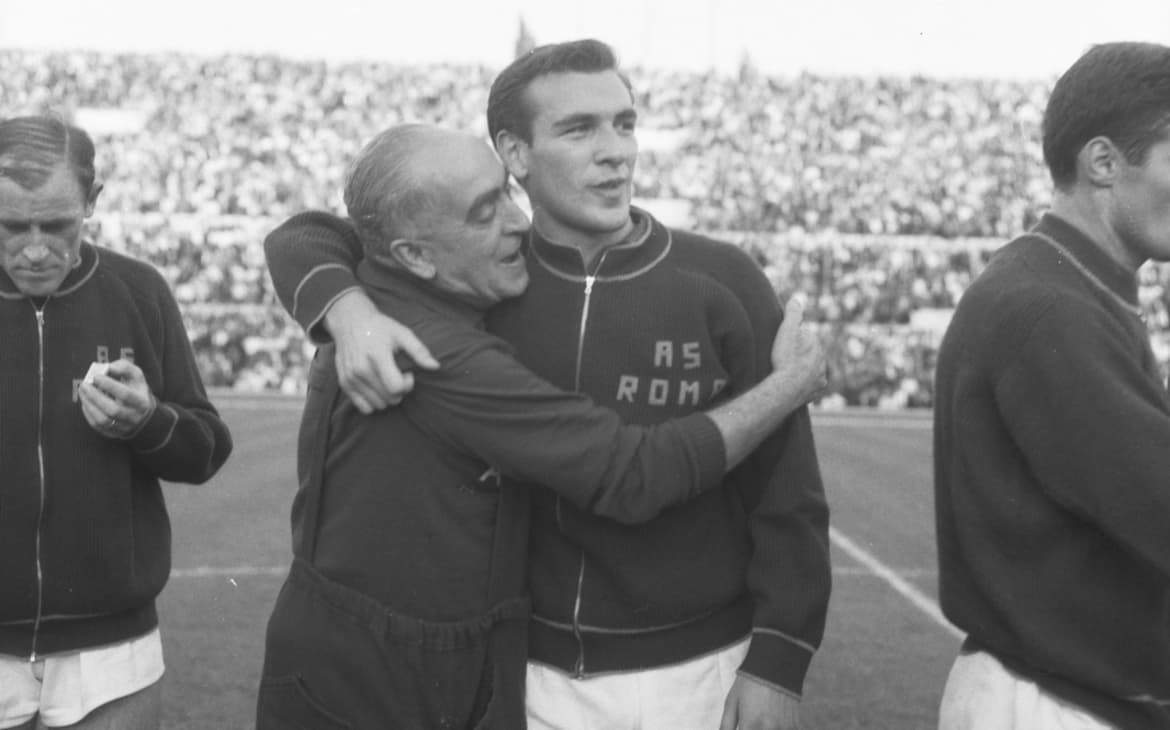
Angelillo with Roma in the early 1960s

During the 1958–59 Serie A season, Angelillo scored 33 goals in 33 matches, finishing the season as the tournament's top scorer. His goal total was the highest since Gunnar Nordahl had scored 34 in the 1950–51 Serie A season, and is still the record for most goals in a single 18-team Italian division season; no player scored as many goals in a single Serie A season until Gonzalo Higuaín finished the 2015–16 Serie A season with 36 goals – until then, the only player since Angelillo to break the 30 goal barrier had been Luca Toni, who scored 31 goals during the 2005–06 Serie A season. With 38 goals for Inter in all competitions throughout the 1950–51 season, Angelillo holds the club record for most goals in a single season, alongside Giuseppe Meazza.

Although Angelillo was Internazionale's highest goalscorer while he was playing there, he did not win any titles with the Nerazzurri. When the club appointed Helenio Herrera as the team's new manager, Angelillo's independent nature, rebellious character, and hedonistic lifestyle off the pitch led to several disagreements between the two; as a result, Angelillo was sold to Roma during the 1961–62 season, for 270 million lire, in spite of offers in Argentina from his former club, Boca Juniors.

From 1961 to 1965, Angelillo played 106 games with Roma in Serie A, scoring 27 times, winning the 1960–61 Inter-Cities Fairs Cup, and the 1963–64 Coppa Italia with the club. He then spent one season at AC Milan, scoring one goal in 11 matches. The following year, he signed with Lecco, playing 12 matches and scoring one goal, with the team being relegated to Serie B at the end of the season. Wanting to return to first division football, he subsequently had a trial with Napoli, before agreeing to return to Milan as a reserve; he only made three appearances, scoring one goal, winning the 1967–68 Serie A title with the club, although he did not appear in Milan's victorious 1967–68 European Cup Winners' Cup campaign that season. In order to gain playing time he then moved to Genoa in Serie B, where he made 22 appearances, scoring five goals. His next and last team was Angelana, which he joined in 1969 as a player-manager, before retiring from professional football in 1971.

== International career ==
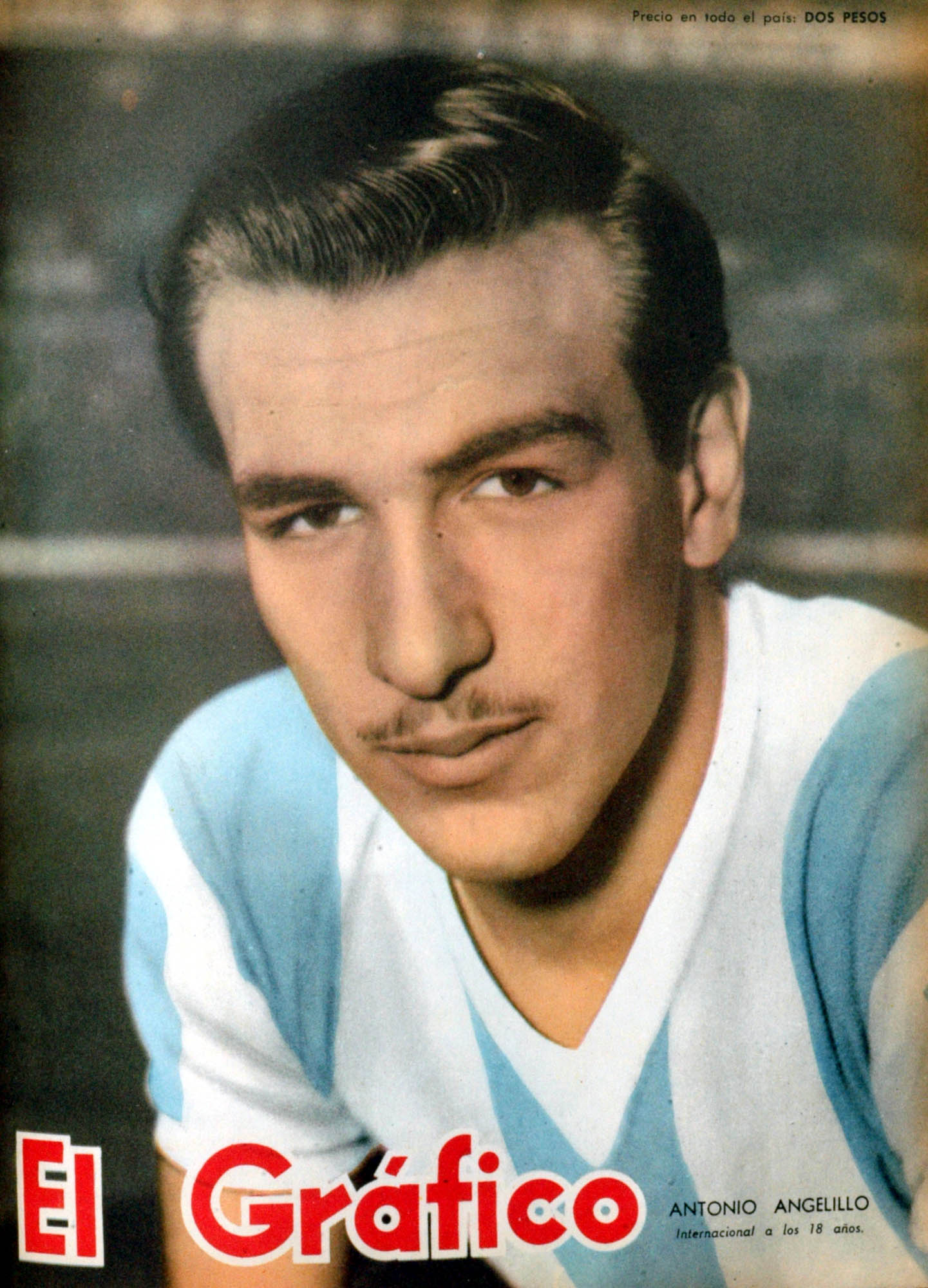
Angelillo with the Argentina shirt on the cover of El Gráfico, 1956

In official tournaments, Angelillo played 11 matches and scored 11 goals for the Argentina national team. During the 1957 South American Championship, which Argentina won, Angelillo was tied for the second-most goals in the tournament, with eight in six matches, scoring in all matches but the last one against Peru After the tournament, he and two other Argentine players (Omar Sívori and Humberto Maschio) were bought by different Italian club teams, and, as a result, the trio were banned from playing for the Argentina national team by the Argentine Football Federation, and missed out on the 1958 World Cup in Sweden; Argentina were eliminated in the first round of the competition.

After moving to Italy and acquiring Italian citizenship through his grandfather, Angelillo later appeared for the Italy national team, making his debut in a 2–1 away defeat to Austria on 10 December 1960, although, in spite of the presence of several foreign-born Italian players – including his compatriots and former teammates Sívori and Maschio –, he was left out of the Italian squad for the World Cup in Chile two years later; in total he made two appearances for Italy between 1960 and 1962, scoring 1 goal, which came in his second and final appearance – a 6–0 home victory over Israel, held in Turin, on 4 November 1961.

== Style of play ==
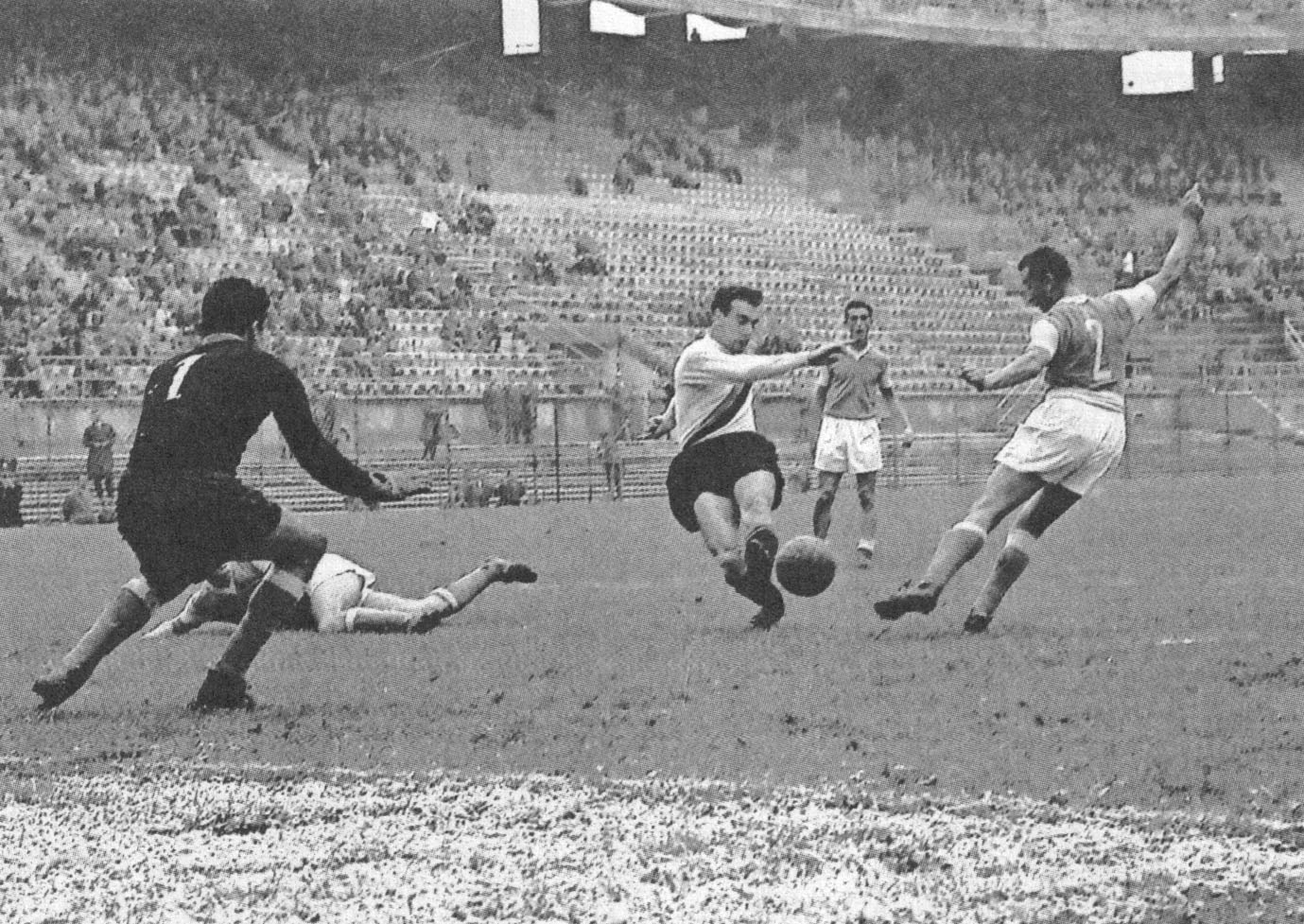
Angelillo (centre) playing for Nerazzurri at San Siro.

Angelillo was mainly knowing for his goalscoring ability, although he was not a traditional striker, he was also known for his defensive work-rate, as well as his ability to orchestrate attacking plays and provide assists for his teammates. He was capable of playing in several other positions, both in attack or in midfield, and throughout his career he was deployed as an inside forward or second striker, as a centre-forward, as a winger, and even as a central attacking midfielder.

== Coaching career ==
After retiring, Angelillo remained in Italy, where he became a coach, managing several lower division clubs. His most notable success came with Arezzo, which he led to win a Coppa Italia Serie C title, a Serie C1 title, and narrowly also missed out on a promotion to Serie A on his first attempt after being promoted to Serie B. Following his managerial career, Angelillo later worked as a scout with his former club Inter in South America, and reportedly discovered Javier Zanetti, who would later go on to captain the club and become Inter's record appearance holder; he later continued to live in Arezzo. His last club was Provincial Osorno in the 1994 Primera División of Chile.

== Personal life ==
Angelillo was married to Bianca, and had two children. Prior to his marriage, while playing for Inter during the 1960–61 season, he had a much publicised affair with the dancer Attilia Tironi – whose stage name was Ilya Lopez – whom he had met in a nightclub. His father was a butcher.

== Death ==
Angelillo died on 5 January 2018, in a hospital in Siena, at the age of 80.

== Honours ==
=== Player ===
Roma

- Inter-Cities Fairs Cup: 1960–61
- Coppa Italia: 1963–64

Milan

- Serie A: 1967–68
- UEFA Cup Winners' Cup: 1967–68

Argentina

- Copa América: 1957

Individual

- Serie A Top-scorer: 1958–59 (33 goals)

=== Manager ===
Angelana

- Prima Categoria: 1970–71

Arezzo

- Coppa Italia Serie C: 1980–81
- Serie C1: 1981–82 (Girone B)

AS FAR

- Moroccan League: 1988–89
