= European Spine Journal =

- Discipline: Orthopedics
- Language: English, French
- Edited by: Robert Gunzburg

Publication details
- History: 1992–present
- Publisher: Springer Science+Business Media
- Frequency: Monthly
- Impact factor: 2.8 (2022)

Standard abbreviations
- ISO 4: Eur. Spine J.

Indexing
- CODEN: ESJOEP
- ISSN: 0940-6719 (print); 1432-0932 (web)
- OCLC no.: 27638222

Links
- Journal homepage; Online archive

The European Spine Journal is a peer-reviewed medical journal dedicated to orthopedics as it relates to all aspects of the human spine. It was established in 1992 and is published eight times per year by Springer Science+Business Media. It is the official journal of EuroSpine, the Spine Society of Europe. The editor-in-chief is Robert Gunzburg, a spinal surgeon in private practice in Antwerp, Belgium. According to the Journal Citation Reports, the journal has a 2022 impact factor of 2.8.
