= Giorgio Aebi =

Italian footballer

Personal information
- Date of birth: 9 September 1923
- Place of birth: Cernobbio, Kingdom of Italy
- Date of death: 14 January 2005 (aged 81)
- Place of death: Milan, Italy
- Position: Forward

Senior career*
Years	Team	Apps	(Gls)
1943–1946	Como	47	(26)
1946–1947	Genoa	7	(0)
1947–1948	SPAL	6	(1)
Total		60	(27)
- * Club domestic league appearances and goals

Giorgio Aebi (9 September 1923 – 14 January 2005) was an Italian footballer who played as a forward. He spent most of his career in Calcio Como. He was the son of Ermanno Aebi, who was a forward for Inter Milan.
