= Ormond Aebi =

American beekeeper

Ormond R. Aebi (February 10, 1916 – July 19, 2004) was an American beekeeper who was reported to have set the world's record for honey obtained from a single hive in one year, 1974, when 404 pounds of honey were harvested, breaking an unofficial 80-year-old record of 303 pounds held by A. I. Root. Together with his father Harry, the Aebi's wrote two books on beekeeping: The Art and Adventure of Beekeeping (1975) and Mastering the Art of Beekeeping (1979) (both currently out-of-print).

== World record in honey production ==
Aebi held a Guinness World Record in quantity of honey produced from a hive of bees, but many others have surpassed that record. Single colonies of bees occasionally produce some spectacular crops. This is sometimes a combination a multiple queens in a hive (see two-queen beekeeping management), excellent weather conditions, or extraordinary good luck.

In 1979, Earl Emde of Big River, Saskatchewan, had several colonies produce over six hundred pounds each, though Guinness was never employed to substantiate the production. Many other beekeepers in Canada, Australia, North Dakota, Florida, and the mid-west have seen similar results on rare occasions. However, a Mr. Rob Smith of Australia surely holds the world’s most astounding result for an apiary. According to Bill Winner, Beekeeper Services Manager, Capilano Honey Company, “We can confirm the average production of 346 kilograms (762 lbs) per hive from 460 hives. (This is almost twice the Aebi claim to fame, and it is an average from hundreds of colonies, not just one hive's unique production.) The beekeeper’s name was Bob Smith from Manjimup, Western Australia. The honey was Karri. The year was 1954.” Mr. Winner adds: “This figure is confirmed by R. Manning with a reference to a journal highlighting a box titled World Record in Honey in 1954."

In comb honey production, during 1959, Karl Killion was reported to have produced 344 sections, an equivalent of approximately 600 pounds of extracted honey production.
