= Magdalena Aebi =

Swiss philosopher (1898–1980)

Magdalena Aebi (4 February 1898, Burgdoft – 12 September 1980, Oberburg) was a Swiss philosopher known for her fundamental criticism of Immanuel Kant.

== Life ==
Magdalena Aebi was born on 4 February 1898 in Burgdoft into the family of Hans Aebi and Marie A. Nubile. After attending high school in Burgdorf she studied classical philology, art history and archeology in Zurich and Munich, as well as philosophy with Ernst Cassirer in Hamburg. In 1943 she obtained her doctorate with a critical thesis on Immanuel Kant soughting to refute fundamental Kantian arguments related to transcendental logic. In 1947 on the basis of her dissertation Aebi published a book Kants Begründung der "Deutschen Philosophie" with detailed critique of the logical foundations of Immanuel Kant's Critique of Pure Reason, in particular of his transcendental logic.

Aebi was in correspondence with Dutch philosopher Evert Willem Beth who disclosed his basic intentions as a thinker in his letters to Aebi.

Aebi lived in a hotel in Zurich, Freiburg and finally in Oberburg. She died in Oberburg on 12 September 1980.

== Critique of Immanuel Kant ==
In her book Kants Begründung der "Deutschen Philosophie." Kants transzendentale Logik, Kritik ihrer Begründung Aebi fundamentally criticizes Kant's transcendental deduction of the pure concepts of understanding in The Critique of Pure Reason. Aebi attempts to prove that the entire Kant's text is unclear, incoherent and contradictory. She constituted quaternio terminorum – the fallacy of four terms – as his main error appearing in two different meanings of transcendental apperception in the middle term of syllogism.

According to Aebi Kant's philosophy proclaims "an immense power of the ego” and this idea has determined his successors. Therefore, German philosophy since Kant has been subjectivist with its basic principle of “I” as the subject.

== Publications ==
- 1945 - Beiträge zur Kritik der transzendentalen Logik Kants.
- 1947 - Kants Begründung der "Deutschen Philosophie." Kants transzendentale Logik, Kritik ihrer Begründung.
- 1948 - Kant fondateur de la philosophie subjectiviste allemande.
- 1953 - Système naturel des sciences d'après l'architectonique de l'être et de sa cognoscibilité: Topologie générale des problèmes.
- 1953-1954 - Critique de la construction marxiste et hégélienne de l'histoire.
- 1954 - L'homme et l'histoire.
- 1955 - Der Mensch in der Einheit des Seins.
- 1956 - Italienreise Mai/Juni 1955.
- 1956 - Integration von Spezialwissenschaften und Philosophie zu einer Ganzheit (natuerl. System d. Wiss.).
- 1957 - Integration von Spezialwissenschaften und Philosophie zu einer Ganzheit : natuerliches System der Wissenschaften.
- 1958 - Mensch und Natur: methodologische Betrachtungen zum Thema.
- 1960 - Die Stellung von Gonseths "offener Philosophie" im Ganzen der Philosophie Perennis.
- 1963 - Versunkene Paradiese oder Die Kunst der Gärten.
- 1967 - Aus Italien.
- 1973 - Die Struktur der Dialektik.
