= Ermanno Aebi =

Italian-Swiss footballer (1892-1976)

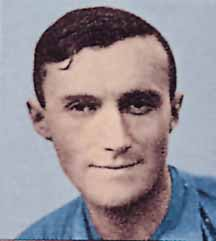
- Aebi

Personal information
- Date of birth: 13 January 1892
- Place of birth: Milan, Italy
- Date of death: 22 November 1976 (aged 84)
- Place of death: Milan, Italy
- Position: Midfielder

Senior career*
Years	Team	Apps	(Gls)
1910–1922	Internazionale	142	(106)

International career
1920	Italy	2	(3)
- * Club domestic league appearances and goals

Ermanno Aebi (Italian pronunciation: [erˈmanno aˈɛːbi]; 13 January 1892 – 22 November 1976) was an Italian-Swiss footballer who played as a midfielder.

== Club career ==
Born in Milan to a Swiss father and an Italian mother, at the age of 16 Aebi was contracted by Internazionale. He contributed to the team's first-ever scudetto (1910), as well as to the club's second league title, ten years later.

== International career ==
Aebi was the first oriundo to play for the Italy national team, on 18 January 1920, against France and scored a hat-trick in Italy's 9–4 win.

== Personal life ==
Aebi's son Giorgio was a player in Calcio Como. Ermanno died in 1976.
