= Llavallol =

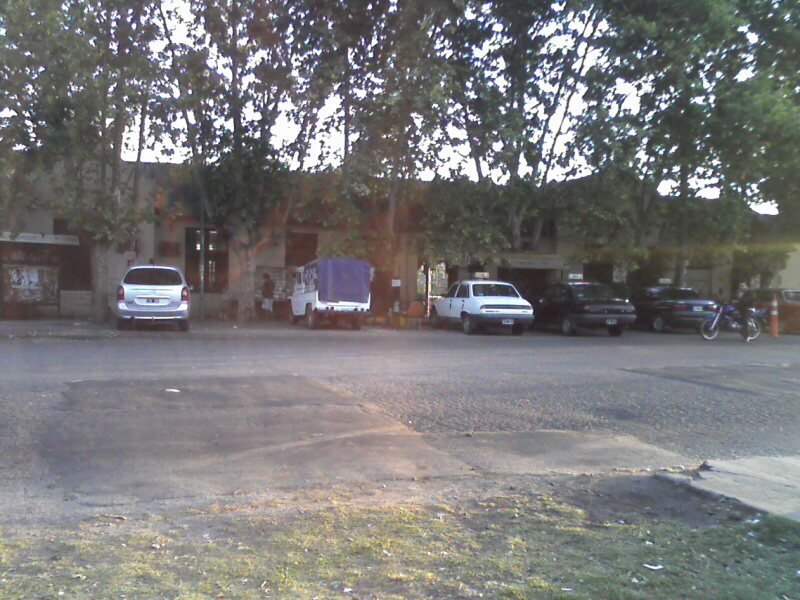

- Location in Greater Buenos Aires
- Coordinates: 34°46′S 58°23′W
- Country: Argentina
- Province: Buenos Aires
- Partido: Lomas de Zamora
- Elevation: 16 m (52 ft)

Population (2001 census [INDEC])
  - Total: 41,463
- CPA Base: B 1836
- Area code: +54 11

Llavallol is a district of Lomas de Zamora Partido in Buenos Aires Province, Argentina. It forms part of the Greater Buenos Aires urban conurbation.

The settlement was named in honour of Felipe Llavallol who governed Buenos Aires between the end of the Battle of Cepeda (1859) and 1860.

== History ==
At the arrival of the Spaniards these lands were occupied by the querandíes. In 1580, the Spanish conqueror Juan de Garay and 80 neighbors founded for the second time Buenos Aires. Later Garay led an expedition against the tribes of the area, taking part of the expulsion of all the autochthonous inhabitants.

In 1585 land grants were granted, executed by Juan Torres de Vera Aragón, and the limits were established taking as a reference the streams, hills, rivers and any natural element that could be used as such. This area corresponded to the Andalusian Pedro López de Tarifa, who was awarded land with the Matanza River half a league wide by two leagues long. He was married to Antonia de Humanes y Molina, probably the first European inhabitant of this region.

Around 1603-1605, Francisco García Romero, married to Mariana González de Santa Cruz, buys the land of Pedro López de Tarifa, and in turn increases the estate with the acquisition of other lands and gives rise to the creation of the hacienda "El Cabezuelo", dedicated to the breeding of cattle and whose extension was of 370 km ², being the greater establishment of the century in its type.

In 1721, at the death of the grandsons of Garcia Romero, the estancia is subdivided and auctioned. Captain Gaspar de Avellaneda acquires what is now Llavallol, including the lands of what is now Santa Catalina, the name imposed by Captain Avellaneda in honor of St. Catherine of Siena . The rest of the lands were acquired by Pedro de Espinoza, who in 1737 sold them to Juan de Zamora. The place ceased to be called "El Cabezuelo" to become "the hills of Zamora".

== Colonia Santa Catalina ==
In 1825 on the initiative of Bernardino Rivadavia and John Parish Robertson a Scottish colony was established in the zone. The first contingent of Scots left the port of Leith in May 1825. There were 43 marriages with 78 children and 14 women and 42 single men. Among them were doctors, surveyors, builders, architects and artisans, as well as farmers and ranchers. They arrived in Buenos Aires in August 1825.

For the construction of the houses of the colony had been contracted to the architect Richard Adams, born in Scotland, who had also been hired to build the first Anglican church in Argentina.

The Colonia de Santa Catalina was mainly dedicated to the production of dairy products.

Guillermo Taylien acquired the lands belonging to the Robertson brothers and installed, in 1832, the first hut of sheep breeders of the country with specimens coming from the United Kingdom. The lands of the area of Monte Grande became property of Tomás Fair, until the town of that name was founded in 1889.

In 1851 the territories of Santa Catalina happened to be property of the Irish Patricio Bookey, that once settled, had wide participation in the creation of the party of Lomas in 1861. He went bankrupt in 1867. The following year (1868) the Rural Society Argentina chose the space of Santa Catalina for the creation of the Agricultural Institute, which was an advance in the practice of agriculture and some projection towards the cattle ranch.

In 1885 The Argentine Army established in the zone the Regimiento 7.º de Caballería commanded by Lieutenant Colonel Arriola . (The military base functioned until 1926)

In 1885 was built in the Colony, a Correctional of Minors, who were taught lessons in agriculture and livestock.

That same year 1885 the railway branch was inaugurated to Cañuelas, and Santa Catalina was called the Primera Estación (First Station). The 30 of August 1885 the name of Felipe Llavallol was imposed to him to this railway station. The railway station and the town of Llavallol take its name in tribute to Felipe Llavallol (1802-1874), politician of a wealthy family, that exerted the governorship of Buenos Aires from the Battle of Cepeda (from 1859) until May 3 Of 1860.

In 1889 the Agronomic Institute moved to the city of La Plata, and in its place, the School of Agriculture and Livestock was installed, whose cycle would extend until 1928.

In 1897, given the great number of people who professed the Protestant religion, the Cemetery of the Dissidents was inaugurated, destined to the population of British and American origin.

In 1890 the current Llavallol Station was inaugurated.

In 1904 the Colegio Euskal Echea was founded, a private educational establishment originally intended for members of the Basque community of Argentina.

In 1908 the German entrepreneur, Emilio Bieckert installed in Llavallol the brewery Bieckert, one of the greatest of its time.

== Gallery ==
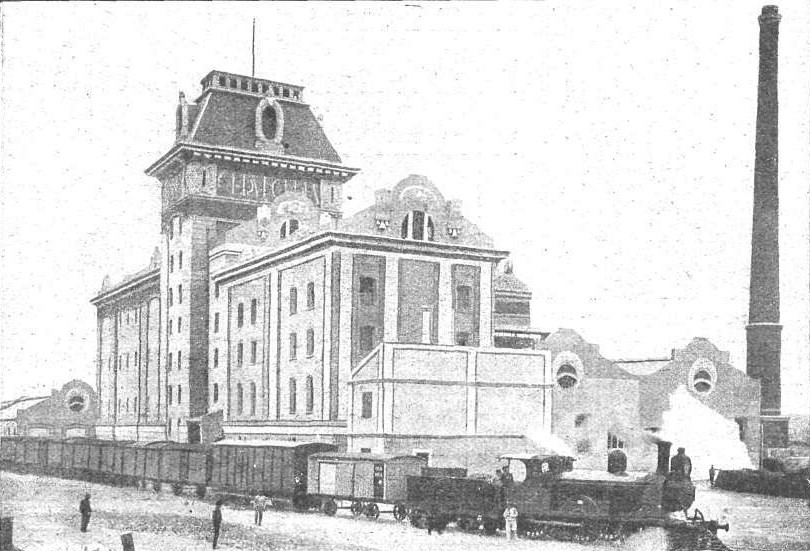
Brewery Bieckert

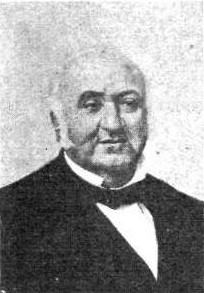
Felipe Llavallol, founder of Llavallol

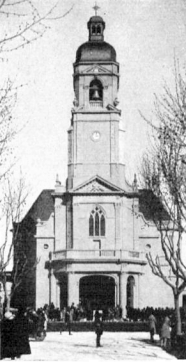
Chapel of the Euskal Echea

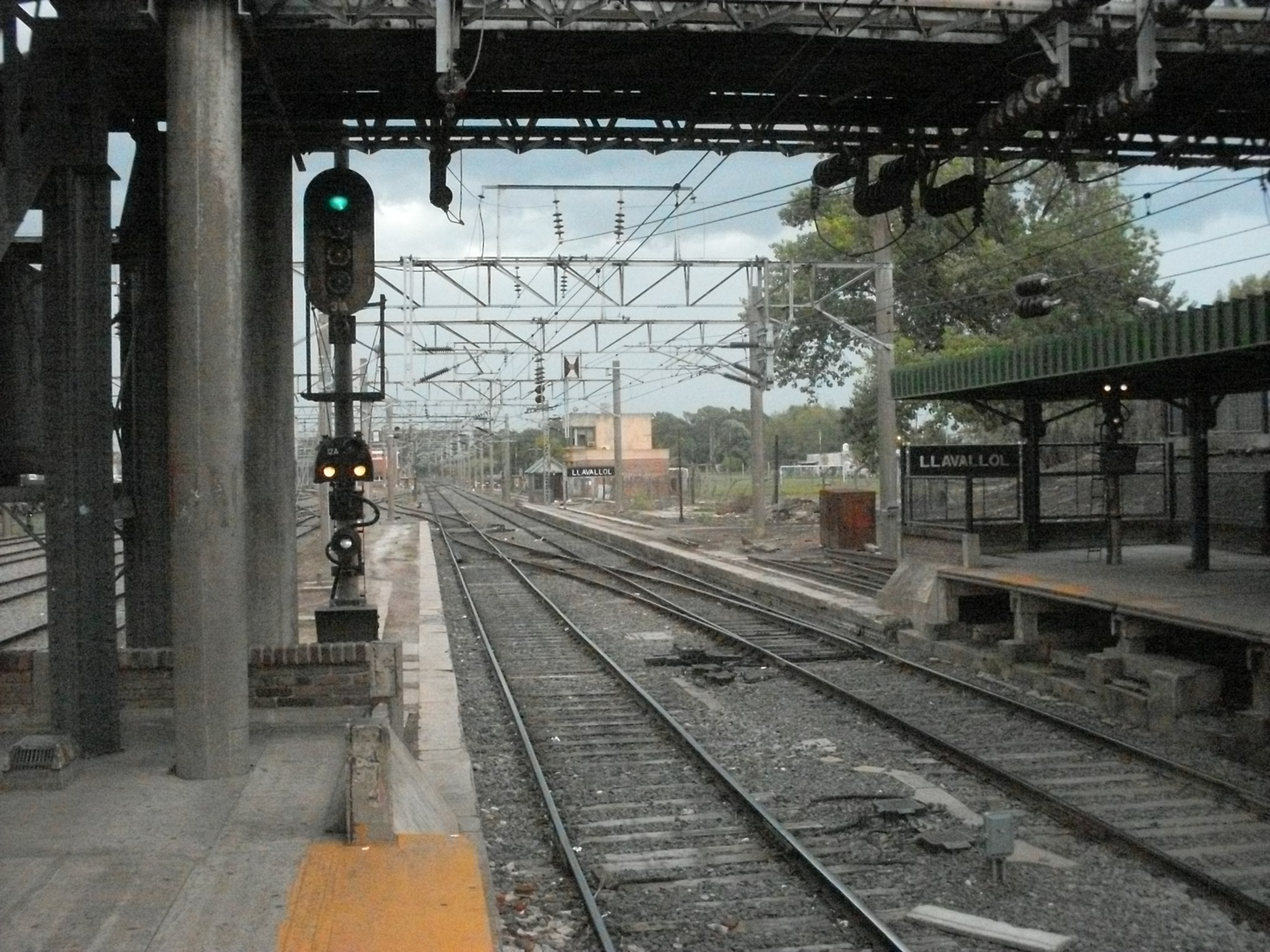
Train Station of Llavallol

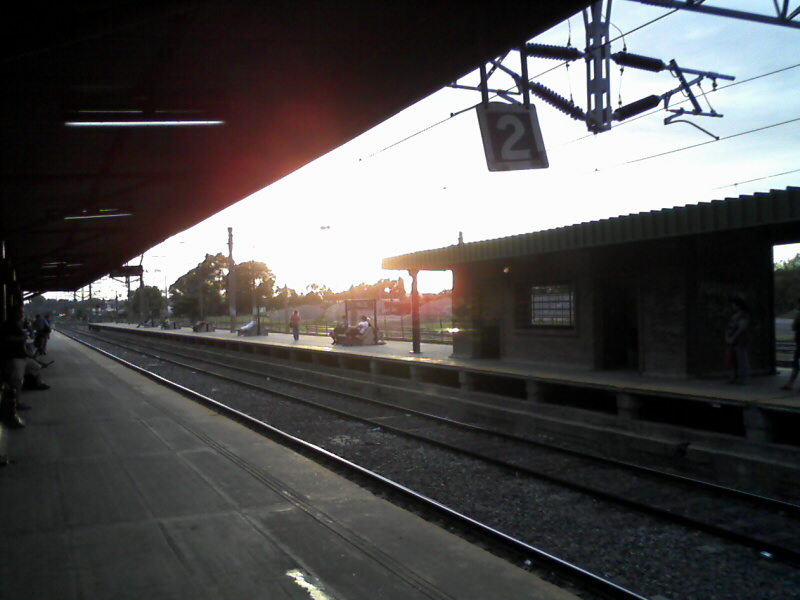
Train Station of Llavallol (platform)
