= 1934–35 FBC Juventus season =

Italian football club season

Foot-Ball Club Juventus
1934–35 season
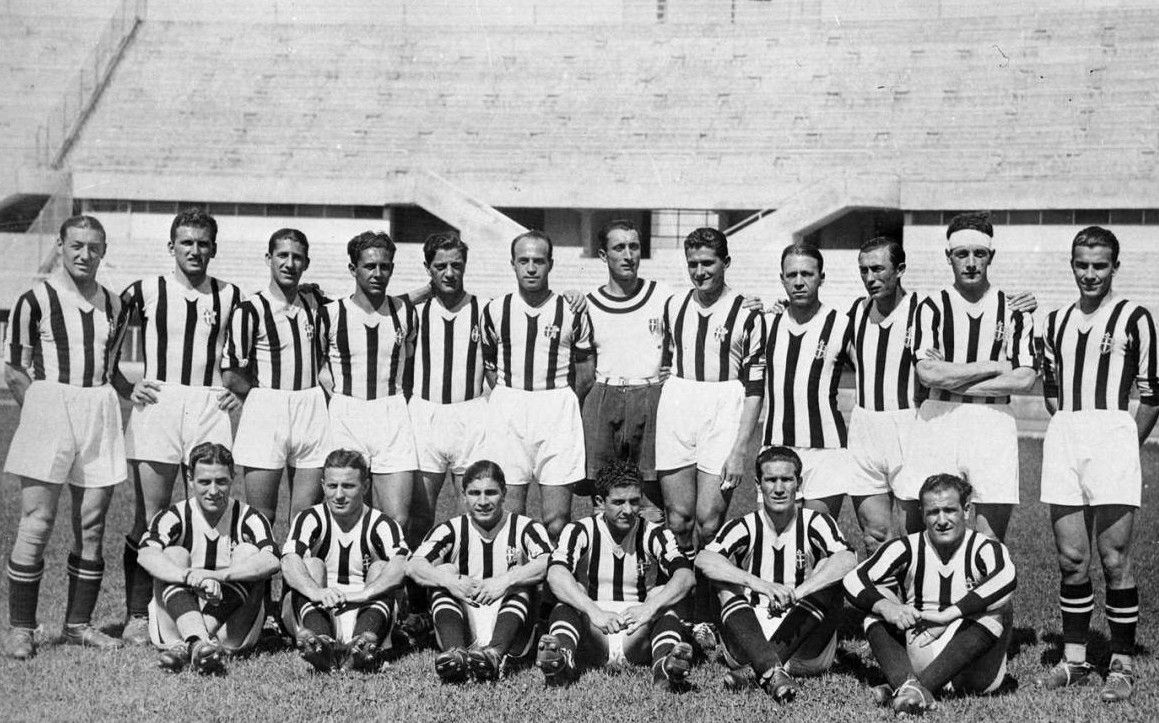
- President: Giovanni Agnelli
- Manager: Carlo Carcano (until 16 December 1934); Carlo Bigatto
- Stadium: Stadio Benito Mussolini
- Serie A: 1st (in Mitropa Cup)
- Mitropa Cup: Semi-finals
- Top goalscorer: League: Felice Borel (14); All: Felice Borel (20)
Home colours

During the 1934–35 season Foot-Ball Club Juventus competed in Serie A and the Mitropa Cup.

== Summary ==
The club won their fifth title in a row, a unique achievement only surpassed in 2017 by the same Juventus. In December 1934 coach Carcano was suddenly removed from the Juventus club in order to stifle a homosexual scandal in which he was implicated by elements of society hostile to him. Bigatto returned to Juventus in a managerial role during the latter part of the season with the club winning the league over Inter by two points; Virginio Rosetta then took over the team in June.

== Squad ==
Note: Flags indicate national team as defined under FIFA eligibility rules; some limited exceptions apply. Players may hold more than one non-FIFA nationality.

Pos.	Nation	Player
GK	ITA	Attilio Bulgheri
GK	ITA	Eugenio Staccione
GK	ITA	Cesare Valinasso
DF	ITA	Umberto Caligaris
DF	ITA	Alfredo Foni
DF	ITA	Virginio Rosetta
DF	ITA	Varglien II
MF	ITA	Luigi Bertolini
MF	ITA	Teobaldo Depetrini
MF	ARG	Luis Monti
MF	ITA	Gastone Prendato

Pos.	Nation	Player
MF	ITA	Luciano Ramella
MF	ITA	Pietro Serantoni
MF	ITA	Varglien I
FW	ITA	Borel II
FW	ITA	Lino Cason
FW	ARG	Renato Cesarini
FW	ITA	Diena II
FW	ITA	Giovanni Ferrari
FW	ITA	Guglielmo Gabetto
FW	ARG	Raimundo Orsi
FW	ITA	Alberto Tiberti

== Competitions ==
=== Serie A ===
==== League table ====
Pos	Team	Pld	W	D	L	GF	GA	GD	Pts	Qualification or relegation
1	Juventus (C)	30	18	8	4	45	22	+23	44	1935 Mitropa Cup
2	Ambrosiana-Inter	30	15	12	3	58	24	+34	42	1935 Mitropa Cup
3	Fiorentina	30	15	9	6	39	23	+16	39	1935 Mitropa Cup
4	Roma	30	14	7	9	63	38	+25	35	1935 Mitropa Cup
5	Lazio	30	13	6	11	55	46	+9	32	

Source: Panini
(C) Champions

==== Matches ====
30 September 1934 1	Brescia	0–2	Juventus	Brescia
		Report	66' Borel II; 74' Serantoni	Stadium: Stadium di Viale Piave; Referee: Giuseppe Scarpi

7 October 1934 2	Juventus	2–1	Napoli	Turin
	Borel II 60'; Ferrari 82'	Report	10' Ferraris II	Stadium: Stadio Benito Mussolini; Referee: Mastellari

14 October 1934 3	Sampierdarenese	0–1	Juventus	Genoa
		Report	50' Ferrari	Stadium: Stadio del Littorio; Referee: Barlassina

21 October 1934 4	Juventus	1–1	Torino	Turin
	Borel II 53'	Report	6' Baldi III	Stadium: Stadio Benito Mussolini; Referee: Scorzoni

4 November 1934 5	Lazio	5–3	Juventus	Rome
	Piola 37', 78'; Fantoni I 38'; Demaría 50'; Levratto 74'	Report	15' Cesarini; 79', 89' Serantoni	Stadium: Stadio Nazionale del PNF; Referee: Giuseppe Turbiani

18 November 1934 6	Juventus	1–0	Ambrosiana-Inter	Turin
	Ferrari 69'	Report		Stadium: Stadio Benito Mussolini; Referee: Mario Ciamberlini

25 November 1934 7	Livorno	1–2	Juventus	Livorno
	Busoni 13'	Report	68' Serantoni; 87' Borel II	Stadium: Stadio Edda Ciano Mussolini; Referee: Umberto Levrero

2 December 1934 8	Juventus	0–0	Triestina	Turin
		Report		Stadium: Stadio Benito Mussolini; Referee: Camillo Caironi

16 December 1934 9	Bologna	2–0	Juventus	Bologna
	Schiavio 13'; Fedullo 16'	Report		Stadium: Stadio Littoriale; Referee: Rinaldo Barlassina

23 December 1934 10	Juventus	4–1	Alessandria	Turin
	Borel II 6'; Cesarini 46', 71'; Serantoni 64'	Report	28' Riccardi	Stadium: Stadio Benito Mussolini; Referee: Generoso Dattilo

6 January 1935 11	Palermo	0–0	Juventus	Palermo
		Report		Stadium: Campo del Littorio; Referee: Raffaele Scorzoni

13 January 1935 12	Roma	1–2	Juventus	Rome
	Scaramelli 30'	Report	59' Borel II; 82' Varglien II	Stadium: Campo Testaccio; Referee: Mario Ciamberlini

20 January 1935 13	Juventus	1–0	Milan	Turin
	Borel II 37'	Report		Stadium: Stadio Benito Mussolini; Referee: Mario Scotto

27 January 1935 14	Pro Vercelli	0–1	Juventus	Vercelli
		Report	65' Orsi	Stadium: Stadio Leonida Robbiano; Referee: Angelo Gianelli

3 February 1935 15	Juventus	0–0	Fiorentina	Turin
		Report		Stadium: Stadio Benito Mussolini; Referee: Raffaele Scorzoni

10 February 1935 16	Juventus	0–0	Brescia	Turin
		Report		Stadium: Stadio Benito Mussolini; Referee: Rinaldo Barlassina

24 February 1935 17	Napoli	0–0	Juventus	Naples
		Report		Stadium: Stadio Giorgio Ascarelli; Referee: Giuseppe Scarpi

3 March 1935 18	Juventus	4–0	Sampierdarenese	Turin
	Borel II 4', 56'; Orsi 55'; Cesarini 60'	Report		Stadium: Stadio Benito Mussolini; Referee: Silvio Pasinati

10 March 1935 19	Torino	1–3	Juventus	Turin
	Bo 81'	Report	72' Borel II; 77' Monti; 79' (pen.) Orsi	Stadium: Stadio Benito Mussolini; Referee: Angelo Gianelli

17 March 1935 20	Juventus	6–1	Lazio	Turin
	Ferrari 10', 22', 44'; Orsi 62'; Depetrini 72'; Borel II 82' (pen.)	Report	55' Fantoni III	Stadium: Stadio Benito Mussolini; Referee: Umberto Levrero

31 March 1935 21	Ambrosiana-Inter	0–0	Juventus	Milan
		Report		Stadium: Arena Civica; Referee: Raffaele Scorzoni

7 April 1935 22	Juventus	2–1	Livorno	Turin
	Varglien II 72', 88'	Report	90' Busoni	Stadium: Stadio Benito Mussolini; Referee: Antonio Bertone

14 April 1935 23	Triestina	2–1	Juventus	Trieste
	Mian 2'; Colaussi 75'	Report	24' Monti	Stadium: Stadio Littorio; Referee: Giuseppe Scarpi

21 April 1935 24	Juventus	1–0	Bologna	Turin
	Varglien II 79'	Report		Stadium: Stadio Benito Mussolini; Referee: Gialma Bevilacqua

28 April 1935 25	Alessandria	0–0	Juventus	Alessandria
		Report		Stadium: Campo del Littorio; Referee: Angelo Gianelli

5 May 1935 26	Juventus	2–1	Palermo	Turin
	Varglien II 8'; Cesarini 75'	Report	4' Blasevich	Stadium: Stadio Benito Mussolini; Referee: Raffaele Mastellari

12 May 1935 27	Juventus	2–1	Roma	Turin
	Varglien II 28'; Borel II 69'	Report	81' Bodini II	Stadium: Stadio Benito Mussolini; Referee: Mario Scotto

19 May 1935 28	Milan	3–0	Juventus	Milan
	Arcari III 15', 69'; Romani 66'	Report		Stadium: Stadio San Siro; Referee: Umberto Levrero

26 May 1935 29	Juventus	3–0	Pro Vercelli	Turin
	Bertolini 49', 54'; Diena II 64'	Report		Stadium: Stadio Benito Mussolini; Referee: Giuseppe Zelocchi

2 June 1935 30	Fiorentina	0–1	Juventus	Florence
		Report	81' Ferrari	Stadium: Stadio Giovanni Berta; Referee: Giuseppe Scarpi

=== Mitropa Cup ===
==== Eightfinals ====
16 June 1935	(Hungary) Viktoria Plzen	3–3	Juventus	Plzeň
	Bína 19'; Biró 36'; Hes 61'		25', 62' Borel II; 33' Ferrari	Stadium: Stadión Viktoria; Referee: (Hungary) Mihály Iváncsics

23 June 1935	Juventus	5–1	(Hungary) Viktoria Plzen	Turin
	Ferrari 6', 87'; Borel II 25', 69'; Diena II 39'		80' Horák	Stadium: Stadio Benito Mussolini; Referee: (Austria) Alois Beranek

==== Quarterfinals ====
30 June 1935	(Hungary) MTK Hungaria	1–3	Juventus	Budapest
	Müller 75' (pen.)		51' Ferrari; 65' Gabetto; 67' Diena II	Stadium: Hungária körút Referee: (Austria) Alois Beranek

6 July 1935	Juventus	1–1	(Hungary) MTK Hungaria	Turin
	Ferrari 15'		48' Titkos	Stadium: Stadio Benito Mussolini; Referee: (Czechoslovakia) Ján Bizík

==== Semifinals ====
16 July 1935 Andata	(Czechoslovakia) Sparta Prague	2–0	Juventus	Prague
	Faczinek 43'; Zajíček 67' (pen.)			Stadium: Letenský Stadion; Referee: (Austria) Alois Beranek

21 July 1935	Juventus	3–1	(Czechoslovakia) Sparta Prague	Turin
	Prendato 1'; Borel II 52', 90'		65' Nejedlý	Stadium: Stadio Benito Mussolini; Referee: (Hungary) Mihály Iváncsics

28 July 1935 Replay	(Czechoslovakia) Sparta Prague	5–1	Juventus	Basel
	Zajíček 21', 87'; Braine 37', 85'; Faczinek 40'		70' (pen.) Foni	Stadium: Stadion Rankhof; Referee: (England) Bert Fogg

== Statistics ==
=== Squad statistics ===
Competition	Points	Home						Away						Total						GD
Competition	Points	G	W	D	L	Gs	Ga	G	W	D	L	Gs	Ga	G	W	D	L	Gs	Ga	GD
Serie A	44	15	11	4	0	29	7	15	7	4	4	16	15	30	18	8	4	45	22	+23
Mitropa	-	3	2	1	0	9	3	4	1	1	2	7	11	7	3	2	2	16	14	+2
Total	-	18	13	5	0	38	10	19	8	5	6	23	26	37	21	10	6	61	36	+25

=== Players statistics ===
==== Appearances ====
No.	Pos	Nat	Player	Total		1934-35 Serie A		1935 Mitropa Cup	
No.	Pos	Nat	Player	Apps	Goals	Apps	Goals	Apps	Goals
		(Italy) ITA	Luigi Bertolini	33	2	26	2	7	0
		(Italy) ITA	Felice Borel	36	20	29	14	7	6
		(Italy) ITA	Umberto Caligaris	11	0	11	0	0	0
		(Italy) ITA	Lino Cason	1	0	1	0	0	0
		(Argentina) ARG	Renato Cesarini	32	5	25	5	7	0
		(Italy) ITA	Teobaldo Depetrini	14	1	14	1	0	0
		(Italy) ITA	Armando Diena	13	3	9	1	4	2
		(Italy) ITA	Giovanni Ferrari	33	12	26	7	7	5
		(Italy) ITA	Alfredo Foni	34	1	27	0	7	1
		(Italy) ITA	Guglielmo Gabetto	13	1	6	0	7	1
		(Argentina) ARG	Luis Monti	27	2	20	2	7	0
		(Argentina) ARG	Raimundo Orsi	21	4	21	4	0	0
		(Italy) ITA	Gastone Prendato	3	1	0	0	3	1
		(Italy) ITA	Luciano Ramella	2	0	2	0	0	0
		(Italy) ITA	Virginio Rosetta	29	0	22	0	7	0
		(Italy) ITA	Pietro Serantoni	15	5	15	5	0	0
		(Italy) ITA	Alberto Tiberti	2	0	2	0	0	0
		(Italy) ITA	Cesare Valinasso	37	-36	30	-22	7	-14
		(Italy) ITA	Giovanni Varglien	16	4	16	4	0	0
		(Italy) ITA	Mario Varglien	35	0	28	0	7	0

== Bibliography ==
- Fabrizio Melegari. Almanacco illustrato del calcio - La storia 1898-2004. Modena. Panini, 2004.
- Carlo F. Chiesa. Il grande romanzo dello scudetto. Calcio 2000.
- La Stampa, years 1938 and 1939.
