= Borel (surname) =

Borel is a surname. Notable people with the surname include:

- Adrien Borel (1886–1966), psychiatrist and psychoanalyst
- Aldo Borel (1912–1979), Italian football player
- André Borel d'Hauterive (1812–1896), French historian
- Armand Borel (1923–2003), Swiss mathematician
- Calvin Borel, American jockey
- Cleopatra Borel (born 1979), Trinidadian athlete
- Daniel Borel (born 1950), Swiss engineer
- Émile Borel (1871–1956), French mathematician and politician
- Éric Borel (1978–1995), French serial killer
- Ernesto Borel (1889–1951), Italian footballer
- Eugène Borel (1835–1892), Swiss politician
- Felice Borel (1914–1993), Italian footballer
- Frédéric Borel (born 1959), French architect
- Gabriel Borel, French aircraft designer
- George Frederik Willem Borel, Dutch military figure
- Henri Borel, Dutch writer, son of George Frederik Willem Borel
- Jacques Borel, French novelist
- Jean-Louis Borel (1809–1884), French general
- Marguerite Borel (1883–1969), French femme de lettres
- Nego do Borel (born 1992), Brazilian singer
- Pascal Borel (born 1978), German footballer and manager
- Petrus Borel (1809–1859), French poet
- Pierre Borel (1620–1689), French chemist, physician and naturalist
- Raymond Borel, French physician
- Suzanne Borel (1904–1995), French diplomat
- Yannick Borel (born 1988), French fencer

== See also ==
- Louis Fauche-Borel (1726–1829), Swiss politician
