= Staccione =

Staccione is an Italian surname. Notable people with the surname include:

- Eugenio Staccione (1909–1967), Italian footballer, brother of Vittorio
- Vittorio Staccione (1904–1945), Italian footballer
