= Borel =

Borel may refer to:

== People ==
- Antoine Borel (1840–1915), a Swiss-born American businessman
- Armand Borel (1923–2003), a Swiss mathematician
- Borel (author), 18th-century French playwright
- Borel (1906–1967), pseudonym of the French actor Jacques Henri Cottance
- Émile Borel (1871–1956), a French mathematician known for his founding work in the areas of measure theory and probability
- Mary Grace Borel (1915–1998), American socialite
- Pascal Borel (born 1978), German footballer
- Pierre Borel, 17th-century French chemist

== Places ==
- Borel (crater), a lunar crater, named after Émile Borel

== Mathematics ==
- Borel algebra, operating on Borel sets, named after Émile Borel, also:
  - Borel measure, the measure on a Borel algebra
- Borel distribution, a discrete probability distribution, also named after Émile Borel
- Borel subgroup, in the theory of algebraic groups, named after Armand Borel

== Other uses ==
- Borel (surname), a surname
- Etablissements Borel, an aircraft manufacturing company founded by Gabriel Borel

== See also ==
- Borrel
- Borrell
