= Boreel =

Boreel is a surname. Notable people with the surname include:

- Adam Boreel (1603–1667), Dutch theologian
- Jacob Boreel (1630–1697), Dutch burgomaster
- Wendela Boreel (1895–1985), British artist

== See also ==
- Boreel baronets, an English baronetcy
- Borel (surname)
