= List of Juventus FC records and statistics =

Juventus Football Club is an Italian professional association football club based in Turin, Piedmont that competes in Serie A, the top football league in the country. The club was formed in 1897 as Sport Club Juventus by a group of Massimo d'Azeglio Lyceum young students and played its first competitive match on 11 March 1900, when it entered the Piedmont round of the third Federal Championship.

This list encompasses the major honours won by Juventus and records set by the club, their managers and their players. The individual records section includes details of the club's leading goalscorers and those who have made most appearances in first-team competitions. The club's players have received, among others, a record twelve Serie A Footballer of the Year, the award given by the Italian Footballers' Association (AIC), eight Ballon d'Or awards and four FIFA World Player of the Year awards, more than any other Italian club and third overall in the latter two cases.

== Honours ==
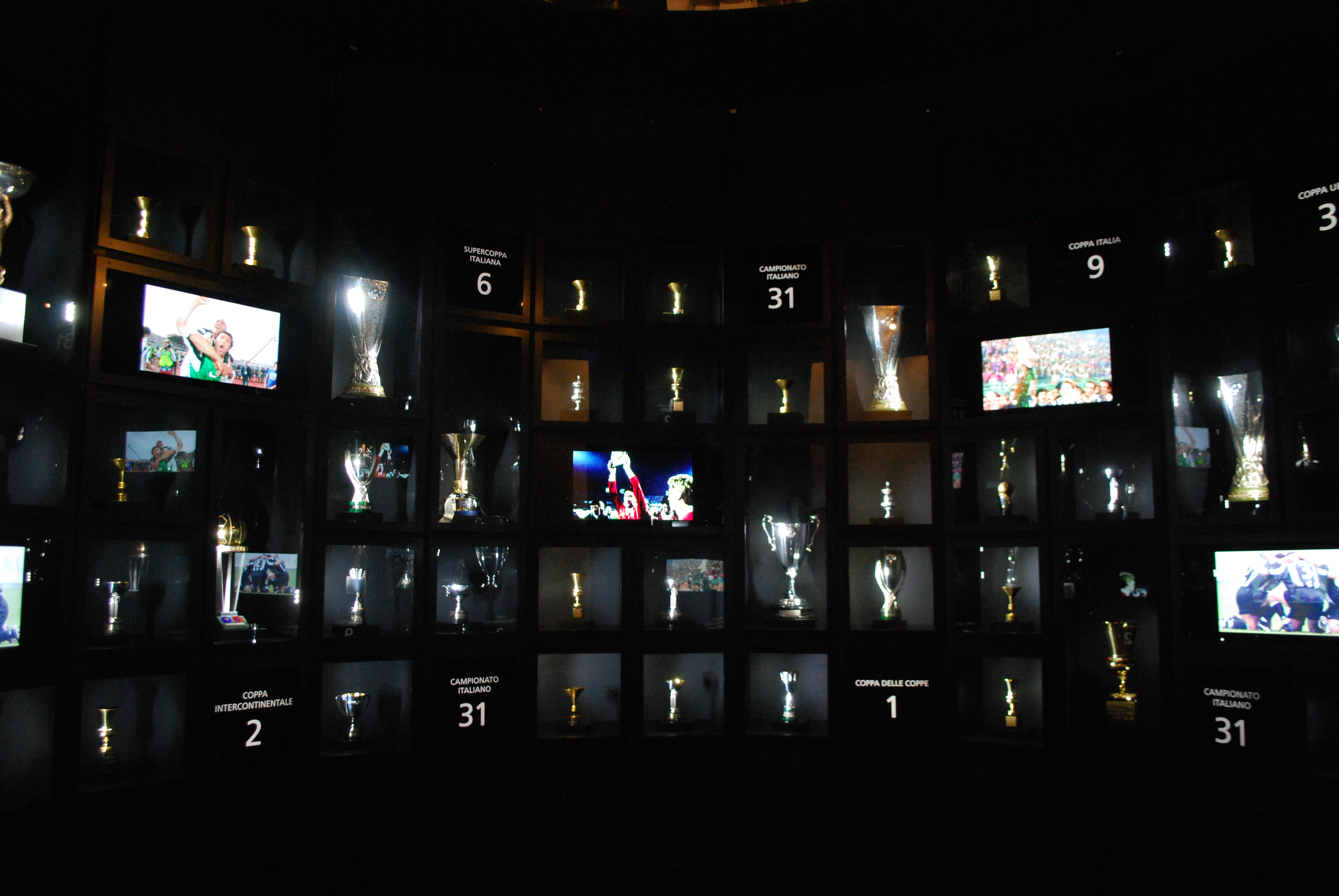
A partial view of the club's trophy room with the titles won between 1905 and 2013 at the J-Museum

Italy's most successful club of the 20th century with the most title in the history of Italian football, Juventus have won the Italian League Championship, the country's premier football club competition and organised by Lega Nazionale Professionisti Serie A (LNPA), a record 36 times and have the record of consecutive triumphs in that tournament (nine, between 2011–12 and 2019–20). They have also won the Coppa Italia, the country's primary single-elimination competition, a record fifteen times, becoming the first team to retain the trophy successfully with their triumph in the 1959–60 season, and the first to win it in three consecutive seasons from the 2014–15 season to the 2016–17 season, going on to win a fourth consecutive title in 2017–18 (also a record). In addition, the club holds the record for Supercoppa Italiana wins with nine, the most recent coming in 2020.

Overall, Juventus have won 71 official competitions, (Note: Including exclusively the official titles won during its participation in the top flight of Italian football.) more than any other club in the country: 60 at national level (which is also a record) and eleven at international stage, making them, in the latter case, the second most successful Italian team. The club is currently sixth in Europe and twelfth in the world with the most international titles won officially recognised by their respective continental football confederation and Fédération Internationale de Football Association (FIFA). In 1977, the Torinese side become the first in Southern Europe to have won the UEFA Cup and the first—and only to date—in Italian football history to achieve an international title with a squad composed by national footballers. In 1993, the club won its third competition's trophy, an unprecedented feat in the continent until then, a confederation record for the next 22 years and the most for an Italian team. Juventus was also the first club in the country to achieve the title in the European Super Cup, having won the competition in 1984, and the first European side to win the Intercontinental Cup in 1985, since it was restructured by Union of European Football Associations (UEFA) and Confederación Sudamericana de Fútbol (CONMEBOL)'s organizing committee five years beforehand.

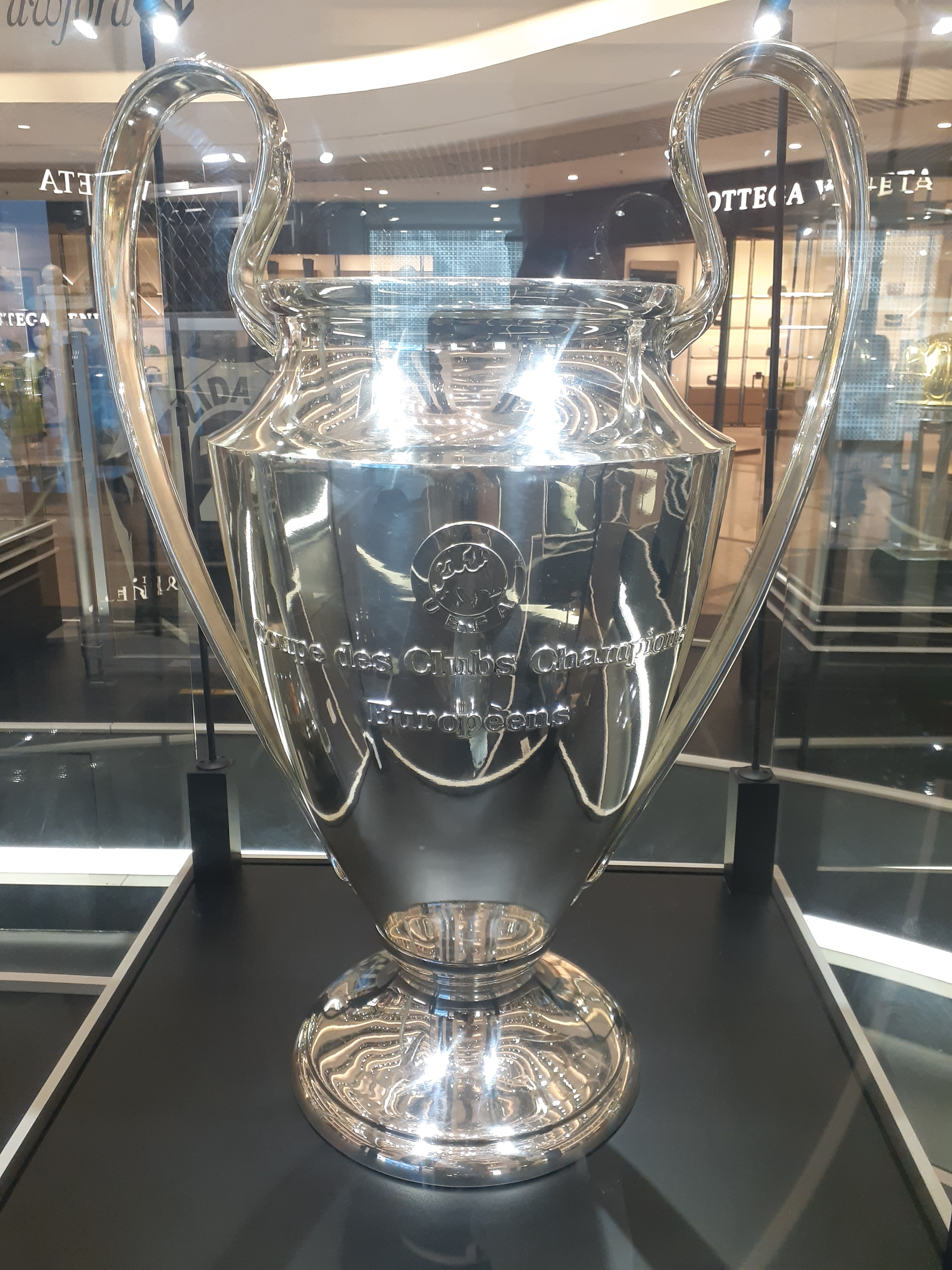
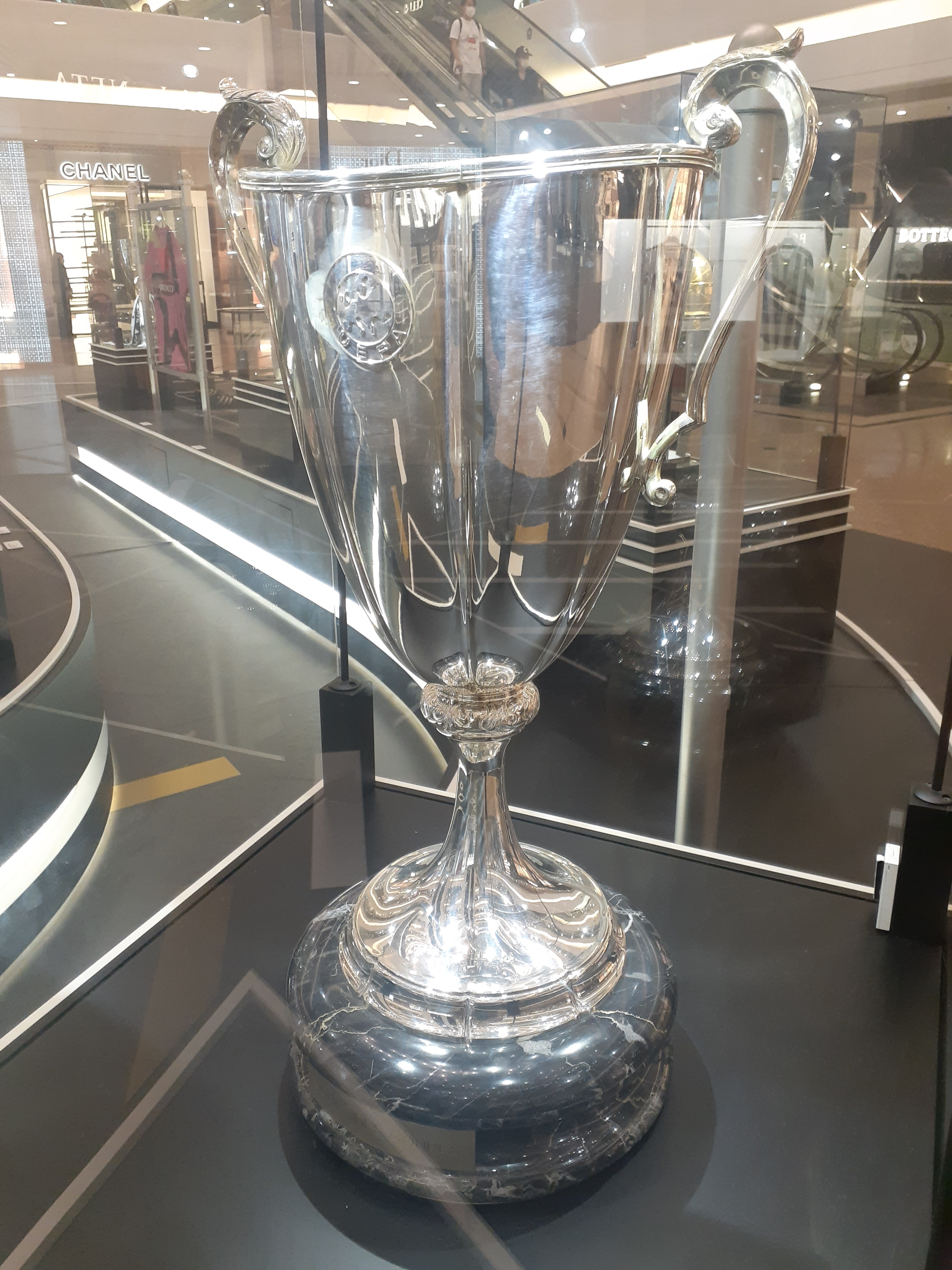
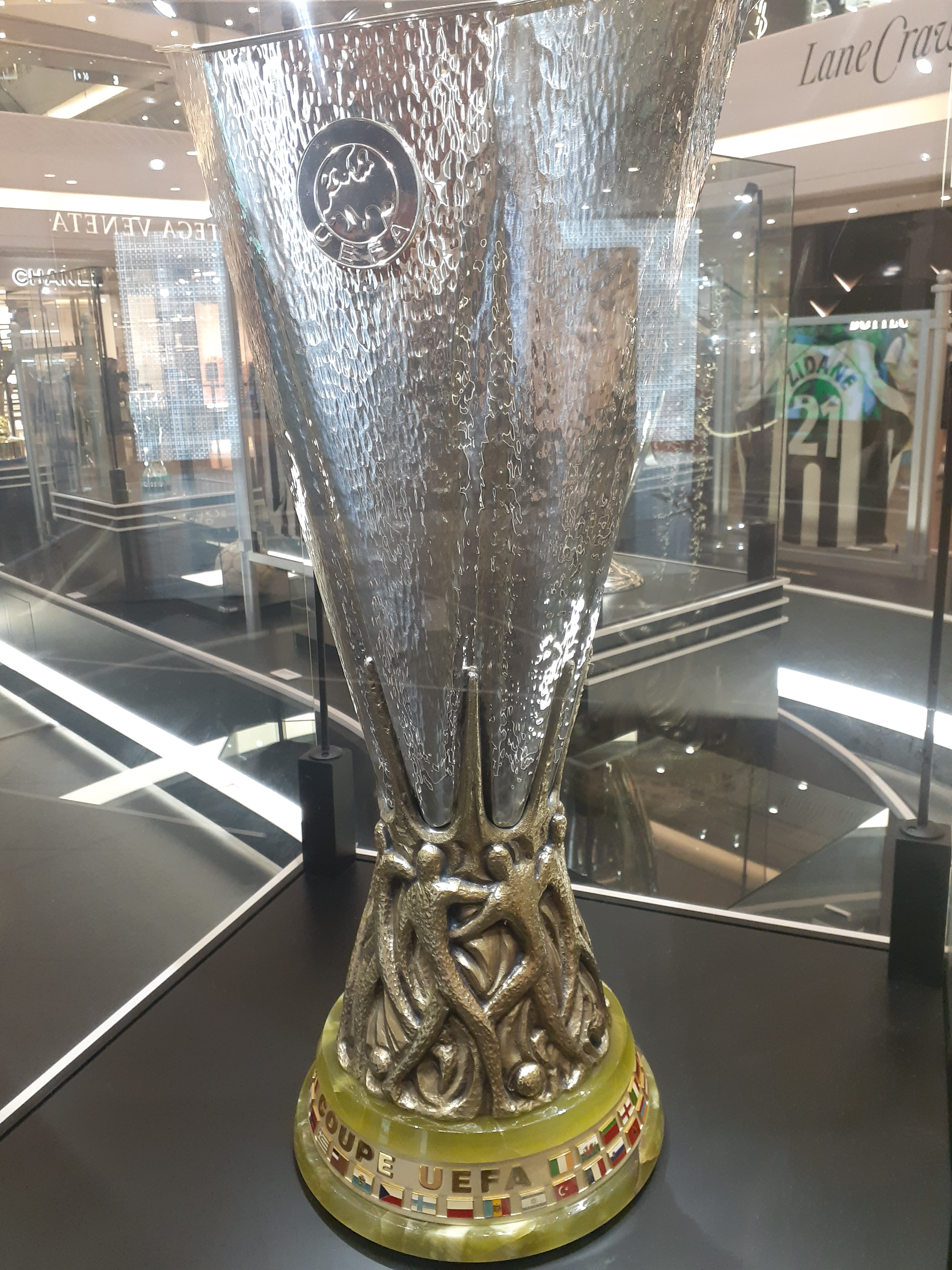
The European Cup (left), the Cup Winners' Cup (middle), and the UEFA Cup (right) trophies, assembling the original European Treble in the Experience Juventus exhibition at Hong Kong in 2021.

The club has earned the distinction of being allowed to wear three golden stars (Italian: stelle d'oro) on its shirts representing its league victories: the tenth of which was achieved during the 1957–58 season, the twentieth in the 1981–82 season and the thirtieth officially in the 2013–14 season. Juventus were the first Italian team to have achieved the national double four times (winning the Italian top tier division and the national cup competition in the same season), in the 1959–60, 1994–95, 2014–15 and 2015–16 seasons. In the 2015–16 season, Juventus won the Coppa Italia for the eleventh time and their second-straight title, becoming the first team in Italy's history to complete Serie A and Coppa Italia doubles in back-to-back seasons; Juventus would go on to win another two consecutive doubles in 2016–17 and 2017–18.

In 1985, Juventus became the first club in the history of European football to have won all three major UEFA competitions, the European Champion Clubs' Cup, the (now-defunct) UEFA Cup Winners' Cup and the UEFA Cup, being also the only one to reach it with the same coach. After their triumph in the Intercontinental Cup in the same year, Juventus also became the first football team ever—remaining the only one at 2022—to have won all possible official confederation tournaments.

Only in the 1910s the club has not won any official competition, a unique case in the country. In terms of overall official trophies won, Juventus' most successful decade was the 2010s. In that period the club won eighteen competitions, ahead of the 1980s and 1990s (both with eleven titles).

=== National titles ===
- Italian Football Championship/Serie A
  - Winners (36): 1905, 1925–26, (Note: Up until 1921, the top division of Italian football was the Federal Football Championship, since then, it has been the First Division, the National Division, and the Serie A.) 1930–31, 1931–32, 1932–33, 1933–34, 1934–35, 1949–50, 1951–52, 1957–58, 1959–60, 1960–61, 1966–67, 1971–72, 1972–73, 1974–75, 1976–77, 1977–78, 1980–81, 1981–82, 1983–84, 1985–86, 1994–95, 1996–97, 1997–98, 2001–02, 2002–03, 2011–12, 2012–13, 2013–14, 2014–15, 2015–16, 2016–17, 2017–18, 2018–19, 2019–20
  - Runners-up (21): 1903, 1904, 1906, 1937–38, 1945–46, 1946–47, 1947–48, 1952–53, 1953–54, 1962–63, 1973–74, 1975–76, 1979–80, 1982–83, 1986–87, 1991–92, 1993–94, 1995–96, 1999–2000, 2000–01, 2008–09
- Coppa Italia
  - Winners (15): 1937–38, 1941–42, 1958–59, 1959–60, 1964–65, 1978–79, 1982–83, 1989–90, 1994–95, 2014–15, 2015–16, 2016–17, 2017–18, 2020–21, 2023–24
  - Runners-up (7): 1972–73, 1991–92, 2001–02, 2003–04, 2011–12, 2019–20, 2021–22
- Supercoppa Italiana
  - Winners (9): 1995, 1997, 2002, 2003, 2012, 2013, 2015, 2018, 2020
  - Runners-up (8): 1990, 1998, 2005, 2014, 2016, 2017, 2019, 2021
- Serie B
  - Winners (1): 2006–07

=== European titles ===
- European Cup / UEFA Champions League
  - Winners (2): 1984–85, 1995–96
  - Runners-up (7): 1972–73, 1982–83, 1996–97, 1997–98, 2002–03, 2014–15, 2016–17
- European Cup Winners' Cup
  - Winners (1): 1983–84
- UEFA Cup
  - Winners (3): 1976–77, 1989–90, 1992–93
  - Runners-up (1): 1994–95
- UEFA Intertoto Cup
  - Winners (1): 1999
- European / UEFA Super Cup
  - Winners (2): 1984, 1996
    - Finalists (1): 1985

=== Worldwide titles ===
- Intercontinental Cup
  - Winners (2): 1985, 1996
  - Runners-up (1): 1973

=== Other honours ===
- National Department of Public Education Cup (3): 1900, 1901, 1902
- Government of City of Torino's Gold Medal: 1901
- City of Torino's Cup (2): 1902, 1903
- Trino Vercellese's Tournament (1): 1903
- International University Cup (1): 1904
- Luigi Bozino Cup (2): 1905, 1906
- Luserna San Giovanni Cup (1): 1907
- Palla d'Argento Henry Dapples (2): 1908
- Federal Championship of Prima Categoria (James R. Spensley's Cup) (1): 1908
- Italian Championship of Prima Categoria (R. Buni's Cup) (1): 1909
- Biella Cup (1): 1909
- FIAT Tournament (1): 1945
- Pio Marchi Cup (1): 1945
- Cup of the Alps (1): 1963
- Italian-Spanish Friendship's Cup (1): 1965
- Pier Cesare Baretti Memorial (2): 1992, 1993
- First Centenary 1897–1997 Cup: Republic of San Marino Trophy: 1997
- Birra Moretti Trophy (6): 1997, 2000, 2003, 2004, 2006, 2008
- Trofeo Luigi Berlusconi (11): 1991, 1995, 1998, 1999, 2000, 2001, 2003, 2004, 2010, 2012, 2021
- TIM Trophy (1): 2009

=== Awards and recognitions ===
==== National ====
- Awarded by the Golden Stars for Sport Excellence by the Italian Football Federation (FIGC): 3

1958, 1982 and 2014

- Awarded as Italy's Club Team of the Year by the Italian Footballers' Association (AIC): 9

1997, 1998, 2012, 2013, 2014, 2015, 2016, 2017 and 2018

- Awarded as Italy's Sports Team of the Year by the newspaper La Gazzetta dello Sport: 5

1985, 1996, 2013, 2015 and 2017

- Awarded as Piedmont's Sports Team of the Year by the Unione Stampa Sportiva Italiana (USSI): 2

2012 and 2013

==== International ====
- Nominated Best Italian football club of the 20th Century and seventh best club in the world in 20th century period by the International Federation of Association Football (FIFA)

23 December 2000

- Nominated Italy's most successful club of the 20th Century and second best European football club in 1901–2000 period by the International Federation of Football History & Statistics (IFFHS)

10 September 2009

- Nominated Italy's most successful club and sixth best world football club of the second decade of the 21st Century (2011–2020 period) by the IFFHS

23 March 2021

- Nominated Italy's most successful club and sixth best European football club of the second decade of the 21st Century (2011–2020 period) by the IFFHS

18 March 2021

- Nominated Best Italian club in the All-Time World Ranking by the International Federation of Football History & Statistics

for three years since the institution of the ranking in 2007

- Awarded as IFFHS The World's Club Team of the Year by the International Federation of Football History & Statistics: 2

1993 and 1996

- Awarded as IFFHS The World's Club Team of the Month by the International Federation of Football History & Statistics: 4

January 2004, September 2005, January 2012 and December 2012

- Awarded as World's Sports Team of the Year by the Association Internationale de la Presse Sportive (AIPS): 2

1984–85 and 1985–86 seasons

- Nominated Champion of the Century in Italian football and second most successful club of the 20th century by the Brazilian sports magazine Placar

November 1999

- Placed 7th in the ranking of the best association football clubs in history by the German Kicker-Sportmagazin

March 2014

- Nominated Italy's most successful club and placed sixth in the ranking of the 30 best association football clubs in history by American Sports Illustrated

March 2026

- Placed 6th in the ranking of the best 40 football clubs in European club competitions history by BBC

April 2020

- Placed 5th in the ranking of the best 100 football clubs in European club competitions history by the French sports magazine L'Équipe

June 2015

- Awarded as World's Sports Team of the Year by the Italian newspaper La Gazzetta dello Sport: 1

1985

- Awarded as European Club Team of the Year by the French sports magazine France Football: 2

1977 and 1990

- Placed 1st in the IFFHS Club World Ranking by the International Federation of Football History & Statistics

16 times since the institution of the ranking in 1991

- Placed 1st in the UEFA club coefficient ranking by the Union of European Football Associations

for seven seasons since the institution of the ranking in 1979

==== Other ====
- Awarded by the Umberto Meazza Cup by the Italian Football Federation (FIGC): 1

1939

- Gianni Brera Award to the Sports Personality of the Year: 1

2013

- Awarded with the Champions of Europe Plaque by Union of European Football Associations (UEFA): 1

2005

=== Achievements ===
As one of the most successful sportive clubs in Italy and the world, Juventus have received during their history of important national and international special recognitions, among them:

- Medaglia di Bronzo al Valore Atletico: 1935

received on 7 July 1935 at Rome from the Italian National Olympic Committee (CONI) in recognition to the fifth consecutive Serie A title won (Italian record).

- Stella d'oro al Merito Sportivo: 1966

received on 22 June 1967 at Rome from the CONI in recognition for the club's outstanding contribution to the Italian sport.

- Collare d'oro al Merito Sportivo: 2001

received on 10 November 2004 at Rome from the Italian National Olympic Committee in recognition for the club's contribution to the Italian football and sport.

- The UEFA Plaque: 1988

received on 12 July 1988 at Geneva (Switzerland) by the Union of European Football Associations in recognition as first club in European football history in triumph in the all three seasonal UEFA competitions.

== Divisional movements ==
Series	Years	First	Last	Promotions	Relegations
A	92	1929–30	2024–25	–	▼1 (2005–06)
B	1	2006–07	2006–07	▲1 (2006–07)	never
93 years of professional football in Italy since 1929
Founding member of the Football League’s First Division in 1921

== Individual records ==
=== Appearances ===
==== Appearances in competitive matches ====
- Most appearances in total – 705 matches, Alessandro Del Piero (1993–2012)
- Most Serie A appearances – 489 matches, Gianluigi Buffon (2001–2018, 2019–2021)
- Most Serie B appearances – 37 matches, Gianluigi Buffon, Alessandro Birindelli and Federico Balzaretti (2006–2007)
- Most Coppa Italia appearances – 89 matches, Giuseppe Furino (1969–1984)
- Most Supercoppa Italiana appearances – 8 matches, Gianluigi Buffon (2002–2017)
- Most UEFA club competitions appearances – 127 matches, Alessandro Del Piero (1993–2012)
- Most European Champions Cup/UEFA Champions League appearances – 117 matches, Gianluigi Buffon (2001–2018, 2019–2021)
- Most UEFA Cup/UEFA Europa League appearances – 42 matches, Roberto Bettega (1970–1980)
- Most UEFA Cup Winners' Cup appearances – 17 matches, Stefano Tacconi (1983–1991)
- Most UEFA Intertoto Cup appearances – 6 matches, Ciro Ferrara, Darko Kovačević, Edwin van der Sar (1999)
- Most appearances in total for a manager – 596 matches, Giovanni Trapattoni (1976–1986 and 1991–1994)
- Most Serie A appearances for a manager – 402 matches, Giovanni Trapattoni (1976–1986 and 1991–1994)
- Most Coppa Italia appearances for a manager – 101 matches, Giovanni Trapattoni (1976–1986 and 1991–1994)
- Most European Champions Cup/UEFA Champions League appearances for a manager – 76 matches, Marcello Lippi (1995–1999 and 2001–2004)
- Most UEFA Cup/UEFA Europa League appearances for a manager – 36 matches, Giovanni Trapattoni (1976–1986 and 1991–1994)
- First Juventus player to play for Italy – Giovanni Giacone (28 March 1920: Switzerland vs. Italy 3–0)
- Youngest player to play for Juventus – Pietro Pastore; 15 years, 222 days
- Oldest player to play for Juventus – Gianluigi Buffon; 43 years, 104 days

==== All-time top 10 appearances ====
As of 1 September 2023 (competitive matches only):

Rank	Player	Years	Total	Italian championship	Coppa Italia	Europe	Other
1	(Italy) Alessandro Del Piero	1993–2012	705	513 (Serie B: 35)	56	**127**	**9**
2	(Italy) Gianluigi Buffon	2001–2018; 2019–2021	685	**526** (Serie B: 37)	25	126	8
3	(Italy) Giorgio Chiellini	2005–2022	561	425 (Serie B: 32)	37	92	7
4	(Italy) Gaetano Scirea	1974–1988	552	377	88	85	2
5	(Italy) Giuseppe Furino	1969–1984	528	361	**89**	78	0
6	(Italy) Leonardo Bonucci	2010–2017; 2018–2023	502	357	36	102	7
7	(Italy) Roberto Bettega	1970–1983	482	326	74	81	1
8	(Italy) Dino Zoff	1972–1983	479	330	74	71	4
9	(Italy) Giampiero Boniperti	1946–1961	459	443	13	3	0
10	(Italy) Sandro Salvadore	1962–1974	450	331	56	62	1

- Note: bold signifies current Juventus player.
- Italian championship = Serie A + Serie B
- Europe = European Champions Cup/Champions League, Inter-Cities Fairs Cup, UEFA Cup/Europa League, Cup Winners' Cup, UEFA Intertoto Cup.
- Other = Supercoppa Italiana, UEFA Super Cup, Intercontinental Cup, European Cup Playoff, Central European Cup (Mitropa Cup).

=== Goalkeeping ===
- Most appearances in total as a goalkeeper – 685 matches, Gianluigi Buffon (2001–2018, 2019–2021)
- Most appearances in Serie A as a goalkeeper – 489 matches, Gianluigi Buffon (2001–2018, 2019–2021)
- Most appearances in Coppa Italia as a goalkeeper – 74 matches, Dino Zoff (1972–1983)
- Most appearances in European Champions Cup/UEFA Champions League as a goalkeeper – 117 matches, Gianluigi Buffon (2001–2018, 2019–2021)
- Longest period without conceding a goal in the Italian Football Championship/Serie A: 934 minutes, Gianpiero Combi, matchdays 3–13 (10*90 minutes); from Juventus 6–0 Milan (25 October 1925) to Parma 0–3 Juventus + 34 minutes of Juventus 3–2 Padova (7 March 1926) in 1925–26
- Longest period without conceding a goal in the Serie A: 974 minutes, Gianluigi Buffon, 26 minutes of Sampdoria 1–2 Juventus (10 January 2016) + matchdays 20–29 (10*90 minutes) + 48 minutes of Torino 1–4 Juventus (20 March 2016) in 2015–16.
- Most clean sheets for the club: 308, Gianluigi Buffon (2001–2018, 2019–2021)
- Most clean sheets for the club in Serie A: 296, Gianluigi Buffon (2001–2018, 2019–2021)
- Most consecutive Serie A clean sheets – 10, Gianluigi Buffon, 2015–16, from matchday 20 to matchday 29
- Most clean sheets in a Serie A season – 22 in 38 matches, Gianluigi Buffon (19) and Marco Storari (3) in 2013–14, Gianluigi Buffon (21) and Neto (1) in 2015–16, Gianluigi Buffon (11) and Wojciech Szczęsny (11) in 2017–18

=== Goalscorers ===
==== Goalscorers in competitive matches ====
- **Most goals in total aggregate** – 290 goals in 705 matches, Alessandro Del Piero (1993–2012)
- Most goals in a single season: – 37 goals in 46 matches, Cristiano Ronaldo (2019–2020)
- Most goals in a single season:
  - In European Champions Cup/UEFA Champions League: 10 goals in 10 matches, Alessandro Del Piero (1997–98)
  - In UEFA Cup Winners' Cup: 9 goals in 8 matches, Roberto Baggio (1990–91)
  - In UEFA Cup/UEFA Europa League: 10 goals in 8 matches, Darko Kovačević (1999–2000)
  - In Inter-Cities Fairs Cup: 10 goals in 9 matches, Pietro Anastasi (1970–71)
  - In Federal Championship = Prima Divisione/Serie A: 35 goals in 24 matches, Ferenc Hirzer (1925–26)
  - In Coppa Italia: 9 goals in 8 matches Omar Sívori (1957–58), 9 goals in 10 matches Pietro Anastasi (1974–75)
- Most goals in a single match:
  - In a single Italian competition match: 6, Omar Sívori (vs. Internazionale 9–1, 1960–61 Serie A, 28. matchday, 10 June 1961) Joint Serie A record with Silvio Piola (Pro Vercelli–Fiorentina 7–2) on 29 October 1933
  - In a single European competition match: 5, Fabrizio Ravanelli (vs. CSKA Sofia 5–1, 1994–95 UEFA Cup, 27 September 1994)
- Most goals with Italy national team:
  - In total aggregate: Alessandro Del Piero – 27 goals in 91 matches – and Roberto Baggio – 27 goals in 56 matches
  - In a single World Football Championship: Paolo Rossi (1982) and Salvatore Schillaci (1990) – 6 goals in 7 matches
  - Total aggregate in World Football Championships: Paolo Rossi and Roberto Baggio – 9 goals

==== All-time top 10 goalscorers ====
As of 12 April 2022 (competitive matches only):

Rank	Player	Years	Total	Italian championship	Coppa Italia	Europe	Other
1	(Italy) Alessandro Del Piero	1993–2012	290	**208**	25	**50**	7
2	(Italy) Giampiero Boniperti	1946–1961	179	178	1	0	0
3	(Italy) Roberto Bettega	1970–1983	178	129	22	27	0
4	(France) David Trezeguet	2000–2010	171	138	2	30	1
5	(Argentina) Omar Sívori	1957–1965	167	135	24	8	0
6	(Italy) Felice Placido Borel II	1932–1941; 1942–1946	158	138	9	0	**11**
7	(Italy) Pietro Anastasi	1968–1976	130	78	**30**	22	0
8	(Denmark) John Hansen	1948–1954	124	124	0	0	0
9	(Italy) Roberto Baggio	1990–1995	115	78	14	22	1
9	(Argentina) Paulo Dybala	2015–2022	115	82	11	18	4

- Italian championship = Serie A + Serie B.
- Europe = European Champions Cup/Champions League, Inter-Cities Fairs Cup, UEFA Cup/Europa League, Cup Winners' Cup, UEFA Intertoto Cup.
- Other = Supercoppa Italiana, UEFA Super Cup, Intercontinental Cup, European Cup Playoff, Central European Cup (Mitropa Cup).

==== Juventus’ Top 15 Most Prolific Capocannonieri (= Serie A Topscorer) in a single Prima Divisione/Serie A season ====
Rank	Player	Season	Goals
1	(Hungary) Ferenc Hirzer	1925–26	35
2	**(Italy)** Felice Placido Borel II	1933–34	31
4	(Denmark) John Hansen	1951–52	30
5	**(Italy)** Felice Placido Borel II	1932–33	29
5	(Portugal) Cristiano Ronaldo	2020–21	29
7	(Wales) John Charles	1957–58	28
7	(Argentina) (Italy) Omar Sívori	1959–60	28
9	**(Italy)** Giampiero Boniperti	1947–48	27
10	(France) David Trezeguet	2001–02	24
11	(Italy) Alessandro Del Piero	2007–08	21
13	(France) Michel Platini	1983–84	20
14	(France) Michel Platini	1984–85	18
15	(Italy) Roberto Bettega	1979–80	16
15	(France) Michel Platini	1982–83	16

== Trophies ==
As of 19 May 2021:

=== Players ===
Rank	Player (years)	Total	Serie A	Coppa Italia	Supercoppa Italiana	ECC/CL	UEFA Cup/EL	Champions League	EuSC	IntCup	ITC	Serie B
1	(Italy) Gianluigi Buffon (2001–2018, 2019–2021)	21	10	5	6	0	0	0	0	0	0	1
2	(Italy) Giorgio Chiellini (2005–2022)	19	9	5	5	0	0	0	0	0	0	1
3	(Italy) Leonardo Bonucci (2010–2017, 2018–2023)	17	8	4	5	0	0	0	0	0	0	0
4	(Italy) Alessandro Del Piero (1993–2012)	16	6	1	4	1	0	0	1	1	1	1
4	(Italy) Andrea Barzagli (2011–2019)	16	8	4	4	0	0	0	0	0	0	0
6	(Italy) Ciro Ferrara (1994–2005)	15	6	1	4	1	0	0	1	1	1	0
6	(Italy) Alessio Tacchinardi (1994–2007)	15	6	1	4	1	0	0	1	1	1	0
6	(Italy) Antonio Conte (1991–2004)	15	5	1	4	1	1	0	1	1	1	0
6	(Italy) Claudio Marchisio (2005–2018)	15	7	4	3	0	0	0	0	0	0	1
10	(Italy) Gaetano Scirea (1974–1988)	14	7	2	0	1	1	1	1	1	0	0
10	(Italy) Gianluca Pessotto (1995–2006)	14	6	0	4	1	0	0	1	1	1	0
10	(Switzerland) Stephan Lichtsteiner (2011–2018)	14	7	4	3	0	0	0	0	0	0	0

- Note: bold signifies current Juventus player.
- ECC/CL = European Champions Cup/Champions League, CWC = Cup Winners' Cup, EuSC = European Super Cup, IntCup = Intercontinental Cup, ITC = Intertoto Cup.

=== Managers ===
Rank	Manager (years)	Total	Serie A	Coppa Italia	Supercoppa Italiana	ECC/CL	UEFA Cup/EL	CWC	EuSC	IntCup	ITC	Serie B
1	(Italy) Giovanni Trapattoni (1976–1986, 1991–1994)	14	6	2	0	1	2	1	1	1	0	0
2	(Italy) Marcello Lippi (1994–1999, 2001–2004)	13	5	1	4	1	0	0	1	1	0	0
3	(Italy) Massimiliano Allegri (2014–2019, 2021–2024)	12	5	5	2	0	0	0	0	0	0	0
4	(Italy) Carlo Parola (1959–1961, 1961–1962, 1974–1976)	5	3	2	0	0	0	0	0	0	0	0
4	(Italy) Antonio Conte (2011–2014)	5	3	0	2	0	0	0	0	0	0	0
6	(Italy) Carlo Carcano (1930–1934)	4	4	0	0	0	0	0	0	0	0	0
7	(Paraguay) Heriberto Herrera (1964–1969)	2	1	1	0	0	0	0	0	0	0	0
7	(Czech Republic) Čestmír Vycpálek (1971–1974)	2	2	0	0	0	0	0	0	0	0	0
7	(Italy) Dino Zoff (1988–1990)	2	0	1	0	0	1	0	0	0	0	0
7	(Italy) Fabio Capello (2004–2006)	2	2	0	0	0	0	0	0	0	0	0
7	(Italy) Andrea Pirlo (2020–2021)	2	0	1	1	0	0	0	0	0	0	0

- Note: bold signifies current Juventus manager.
- ECC/CL = European Champions Cup/Champions League, CWC = Cup Winners' Cup, EuSC = European Super Cup, IntCup = Intercontinental Cup, ITC = Intertoto Cup.

=== Individual recognitions ===
==== Ballon d'Or ====
Year	Player
1961	(Argentina) Omar Sívori
1982	(Italy) Paolo Rossi
1983, 1984, 1985	(France) Michel Platini
1993	(Italy) Roberto Baggio
1998	(France) Zinedine Zidane
2003	(Czech Republic) Pavel Nedvěd

* Juventus is the Italian team, and second overall, with the most players recognized with the FIFA World Player of the Year Award (3 players in 4 times).

==== UEFA Club Footballer of the Year/UEFA Men's Player of the Year Award ====
Season	Player
2002–03	(Italy) Gianluigi Buffon

* Gianluigi Buffon is the only goalkeeper to ever win this award.

==== The Best FIFA Goalkeeper ====
Year	Player
2017	(Italy) Gianluigi Buffon

==== UEFA Club Football Awards for the Best Goalkeeper ====
Season	Player
2002–03	(Italy) Gianluigi Buffon
2016–17	(Italy) Gianluigi Buffon

==== UEFA Club Football Awards for the Best Midfielder ====
Season	Player
1997–98	(France) Zinedine Zidane
2002–03	(Czech Republic) Pavel Nedvěd

==== UEFA Team of the Year ====
Most appearances: 5 (Italy) Gianluigi Buffon: 2003, 2004, 2006, 2016, 2017

==== UEFA Champions League Squad of the Season ====
Most appearances: 2 (Italy) Gianluigi Buffon: 2015, 2017, (Italy) Giorgio Chiellini: 2015, 2018

==== UEFA Europa League Squad of the Season ====
Most appearances: 1 (Italy) Gianluigi Buffon: 2014, (Italy) Leonardo Bonucci: 2014, (Italy) Andrea Pirlo: 2014, (Argentina) Carlos Tevez: 2014

==== UEFA Golden Player Award 1955–2005 ====
Country	Player
Belarus	(Belarus) Sergeij Alejnikov
Denmark	(Denmark) Michael Laudrup
Italy	(Italy) Dino Zoff
San Marino	(San Marino) Massimo Bonini
Wales	(Wales) John William Charles

==== Serie A Players of the Year Awards ====
Serie A Footballer of the Year

Year	Player
2001	(France) Zinedine Zidane
2002	(France) David Trezeguet
2003	(Czech Republic) Pavel Nedvěd
2006	(Italy) Fabio Cannavaro
2012	(Italy) Andrea Pirlo
2013	(Italy) Andrea Pirlo
2014	(Italy) Andrea Pirlo
2015	(Argentina) Carlos Tevez
2016	(Italy) Leonardo Bonucci
2017	(Italy) Gianluigi Buffon
2019	(Portugal) Cristiano Ronaldo
2020	(Portugal) Cristiano Ronaldo

* Juventus is the Italian team with the most players recognized with a Serie A Footballer of the Year title (nine players on twelve occasions).

* Gianluigi Buffon is the only goalkeeper to ever win this award.

* Andrea Pirlo is one of only two players to win this award three times.

* Andrea Pirlo is the only player to win this award three consecutive times.

Serie A Italian Footballer of the Year

Year	Player
1998	(Italy) Alessandro Del Piero
2006	(Italy) Fabio Cannavaro
2008	(Italy) Alessandro Del Piero

* Alessandro Del Piero is one of only two players to win this award multiple times and is second overall.

Serie A Foreign Footballer of the Year

Year	Player
1997	(France) Zinedine Zidane
2001	(France) Zinedine Zidane
2002	(France) David Trezeguet
2003	(Czech Republic) Pavel Nedvěd
2005	(Sweden) Zlatan Ibrahimović

Serie A Goalkeeper of the Year (From 1997 to 2010)

Year	Player
1997	(Italy) Angelo Peruzzi (1)
1998	(Italy) Angelo Peruzzi (2)
2002	(Italy) Gianluigi Buffon (3)
2003	(Italy) Gianluigi Buffon (4)
2004	(Italy) Gianluigi Buffon (5)
2005	(Italy) Gianluigi Buffon (6)
2006	(Italy) Gianluigi Buffon (7)
2008	(Italy) Gianluigi Buffon (8)

* Juventus is the Italian team with the most goalkeepers recognized with a Serie A Goalkeeper of the Year title (2 players on 8 occasions), including the only goalkeeper to win it 8 times, Gianluigi Buffon.

- The 1st two times Gianluigi Buffon won this title, he was playing for Parma.
- Angelo Peruzzi won this title a third time (joint second overall), when he was playing for Lazio.

Serie A Defender of the Year (From 1997 to 2010)

Year	Player
2005	(Italy) Fabio Cannavaro (1)
2006	(Italy) Fabio Cannavaro (2)
2008	(Italy) Giorgio Chiellini (1)
2009	(Italy) Giorgio Chiellini (2)
2010	(Italy) Giorgio Chiellini (3)

* Juventus is the Italian team with the most defenders recognized with a Serie A Defender of the Year title (2 players on 5 occasions),

Serie A Awards (Started in 2018)

Award	Winner	Season
Most Valuable Player	(Portugal) Cristiano Ronaldo	2018–19
Most Valuable Player	(Argentina) Paulo Dybala	2019–20
Best Goalkeeper	(Poland) Wojciech Szczęsny	2019–20
Best Striker	(Portugal) Cristiano Ronaldo	2020–21
Best Young Player	(Italy) Nicolò Fagioli	2022–23

==== Serie A Team of the Year (started in 2010–11) ====
Goalkeepers in Serie A Team of the Year (started in 2010–11)

Season	Player
2011–12	(Italy) Gianluigi Buffon (1)
2013–14	(Italy) Gianluigi Buffon (2)
2014–15	(Italy) Gianluigi Buffon (3)
2015–16	(Italy) Gianluigi Buffon (4)
2016–17	(Italy) Gianluigi Buffon (5)

* Juventus is the Italian team with the most goalkeepers recognized with a Serie A Team of the Year title (1 player on 5 occasions), including the only goalkeeper to win it 5 times, Gianluigi Buffon.

* Gianluigi Buffon has in total been Serie A best goalkeeper a record 13 times (8 times Serie A Goalkeeper of the Year (From 1997 to 2010) + 5 times Goalkeeper in Serie A Team of the Year).

Defenders in Serie A Team of the Year (started in 2010–11)

Season	Player
2011–12	(Italy) Andrea Barzagli (1)
2012–13	(Italy) Giorgio Chiellini (1)
2012–13	(Italy) Andrea Barzagli (2)
2013–14	(Italy) Andrea Barzagli (3)
2013–14	(Ghana) Kwadwo Asamoah (1)
2014–15	(Italy) Giorgio Chiellini (2)
2014–15	(Italy) Leonardo Bonucci (1)
2015–16	(Italy) Giorgio Chiellini (3)
2015–16	(Italy) Andrea Barzagli (4)
2015–16	(Italy) Leonardo Bonucci (2)
2016–17	(Italy) Leonardo Bonucci (3)
2016–17	(Brazil) Alex Sandro (1)
2016–17	(Brazil) Dani Alves (1)
2017–18	(Italy) Giorgio Chiellini (4)
2017–18	(Brazil) Alex Sandro (2)
2018–19	(Italy) Giorgio Chiellini (5)
2018–19	(Portugal) João Cancelo (2)
2019–20	(Italy) Leonardo Bonucci (4)

* Juventus is the Italian team with the most defenders recognized with a Serie A Defender of the Year title (7 players on 9 occasions), including the only defender to win it 5 times, Giorgio Chiellini.

* Giorgio Chiellini has in total been Serie A best defender a record 8 times (3 times Serie A Defender of the Year (From 1997 to 2010) + 5 times Defender in Serie A Team of the Year).

Midfielders in Serie A Team of the Year (started in 2010–11)

Season	Player
2010–11	(Italy) Claudio Marchisio (1)
2011–12	(Italy) Claudio Marchisio (2)
2011–12	(Italy) Andrea Pirlo (1)
2012–13	(Italy) Andrea Pirlo (2)
2012–13	(Chile) Arturo Vidal (1)
2013–14	(Italy) Andrea Pirlo (3)
2013–14	(Chile) Arturo Vidal (2)
2013–14	(France) Paul Pogba (1)
2014–15	(Italy) Andrea Pirlo (4)
2014–15	(France) Paul Pogba (2)
2015–16	(France) Paul Pogba (3)
2016–17	(Bosnia and Herzegovina) Miralem Pjanić (2)
2017–18	(Bosnia and Herzegovina) Miralem Pjanić (3)
2018–19	(Bosnia and Herzegovina) Miralem Pjanić (4)
2020–21	(Italy) Federico Chiesa (1)

* Juventus is the Italian team with the most midfielders recognized with a Serie A Midfielder of the Year title (5 players on 10 occasions), including 2 of the 3 midfielders to win it 4 times, Andrea Pirlo and Miralem Pjanić.

* Andrea Pirlo & Miralem Pjanić have in total been Serie A best midfielders a joint record 4 times (4 times Midfielder in Serie A Team of the Year).

- The first time Miralem Pjanić won this title, he was playing for Roma.

Forwards in Serie A Team of the Year (started in 2010–11)

Season	Player
2013–14	(Argentina) Carlos Tevez (1)
2014–15	(Argentina) Carlos Tevez (2)
2015–16	(Argentina) Paulo Dybala (1)
2016–17	(Argentina) Paulo Dybala (2)
2016–17	(Argentina) Gonzalo Higuaín (3)
2017–18	(Argentina) Paulo Dybala (3)
2018–19	(Portugal) Cristiano Ronaldo (1)
2019–20	(Argentina) Paulo Dybala (4)
2019–20	(Portugal) Cristiano Ronaldo (2)
2020–21	(Portugal) Cristiano Ronaldo (3)

* Juventus is the Italian team with the most forwards recognized with a Serie A Forward of the Year title (4 players on 8 occasions), including the only forward to win it 4 times, Paulo Dybala.

* Paulo Dybala has in total been Serie A best forward a record 4 times (4 times Forward in Serie A Team of the Year).

- The first two times Gonzalo Higuaín won this title, he was playing for Napoli.

Most appearances in Serie A Team of the Year:

5 (Italy) Gianluigi Buffon: 2012, 2014, 2015, 2016, 2017, (Italy) Giorgio Chiellini: 2013, 2015, 2016, 2018, 2019
4 (Italy) Andrea Pirlo: 2012, 2013, 2014, 2015, (Italy) Andrea Barzagli: 2012, 2013, 2014, 2016, (Italy) Leonardo Bonucci: 2015, 2016, 2017, 2020, (Argentina) Paulo Dybala: 2016, 2017, 2018, 2020

- Juventus has 18 different players inducted in the Serie A Team of the Year, more than other Italian club.

==== Serie A Coach of the Year ====
Coach	Year
(Italy) Marcello Lippi	1997; 1998
(Italy) Carlo Ancelotti	2001
(Italy) Fabio Capello	2005
(Italy) Antonio Conte	2012; 2013; 2014
(Italy) Massimiliano Allegri	2015; 2016; 2018

==== European Footballer of the Year (Ballon d'Or) ====
Year	Player
1961	(Argentina) Omar Sívori
1982	(Italy) Paolo Rossi
1983, 1984, 1985	(France) Michel Platini
1993	(Italy) Roberto Baggio
1998	(France) Zinedine Zidane
2003	(Czech Republic) Pavel Nedvěd

* Juventus is the Italian team with the most players recognized with the Ballon d'Or (6 players on 8 occasions), as well as the team with the third most overall.

==== World Soccer Player of the Year ====
Year	Player
1982	(Italy) Paolo Rossi
1984	(France) Michel Platini
1985	(France) Michel Platini
1993	(Italy) Roberto Baggio
1995	(Italy) Gianluca Vialli
1998	(France) Zinedine Zidane
2003	(Czech Republic) Pavel Nedvěd
2006	(Italy) Fabio Cannavaro

* Juventus is the Italian team, and second overall, with the most players recognized with the World Soccer Player of the Year Award (7 players in 8 times).

==== Golden Foot International Football Award ====
Year	Player
2004	(Czech Republic) Pavel Nedvěd
2007	(Italy) Alessandro Del Piero
2016	(Italy) Gianluigi Buffon
2020	(Portugal) Cristiano Ronaldo

==== European Golden Boy ====
Year	Player
2013	(France) Paul Pogba

==== Kopa Trophy ====
Year	Player
2019	(Netherlands) Matthijs de Ligt

== Club records ==
- Consecutive League football championship titles: 9 (from 2011–12 to 2019–20)
- Consecutive Coppa Italia titles: 4 (from 2014–15 to 2017–18)
- Consecutive Doubles: 4 (from 2014–15 to 2017–18)

=== First competitive matches ===
- In Italian competition: vs. FC Torinese, Third Federal Championship, First Round, First Leg, 11 March 1900 (lost 1–0)
- In European competition (since the Union of European Football Associations): vs. Wiener SK, European Champions Clubs' Cup 1958–59, First Round, First Leg, 24 September 1958 (won 3–1)

=== Club records ===
As of 20 May 2018.

- Victories and defeats:
  - Home victory: 11–0 vs. Fiorentina, Federal Championship, 7 October 1928
    11–0 vs. Fiumana, Federal Championship, 4 November 1928
  - Away victory: 15–0 vs. Cento, Coppa Italia, second round, 6 January 1927
  - Home defeat: 0–8 vs. Torino Calcio, Federal Championship, 17 November 1912
  - Away defeat: 1–8 vs. Milan, 14 January 1912
- Most points in any top five European domestic league
  - 102 in 38 games (2013–14)
- Most points in a season:
  - 3 points for a win: 102 in 38 games (2013–14)
  - 2 points for a win: 62 in 38 games (1949–50)
- Most league victories in a season: 33 in 38 games (2013–14)
- Most home wins in a season: 19 in 19 games (2013–14)
- Fewest league draws in a season: 3 in 38 games (2013–14)
- Most league draws in a season: 17 in 34 games (1955–56)
- Fewest league defeats in a season: 0 in 38 games (2011–12)
- Most league defeats in a season: 15 in 38 games (1961–62, 2009–10)
- Most league goals scored in a season (by team): 103 in 38 games (1950–51)
- Fewest league goals scored in a season (by team): 28 in 30 games (1938–39)
- Fewest league goals conceded in a season (by team): 14 in 30 games (1981–82)
- Most league goals conceded in a season (by team): 56 in 34 games (1961–62)
- Longest sequence of League victories:
  - In a single season: 15, since 11th match on 31 October 2015 (Juventus 2–1 Torino) to 25th match on 13 February 2016 (Juventus 1–0 Napoli)
  - Overlapping seasons: 13, since the 32nd match of the 2013–14 season to the 6th match of the 2014–15 season
  - Since the first match in a single season: 9, (2005–06)
- Longest sequence of unbeaten league matches (consecutive matches):
  - In a single season: 38 (2011–12. With 38 matches in the 2011–12 league season, Juventus finished unbeaten in the league)
  - Overall: 49 (since 38th match of the 2010–11 season to 10th match of the 2012–13 season)
- Longest sequence of league matches without a victory:
  - In a single season: 8 (1938–39 season and 1955–56 season)
  - Overall: 13 (since the eighteenth to thirty-first match of 1955–56 season and since the 12th to 25th match of the 1961–62 season)
- Longest sequence of League defeats:
  - Overall and in a single season: 7 (since the third to 28th to 34th match of the 1961–62 season)

=== Signings ===
The sale of Zinedine Zidane to Real Madrid of Spain from Juventus in 2001 was the world football transfer record at the time, costing the Spanish club around €77.5 million (150 billion lire).

The intake of Gianluigi Buffon in 2001 from Parma cost Juventus €52 million (100 billion lire), making it the then-most expensive transfer for a goalkeeper of all-time until 2018.

On 26 July 2016, Juventus signing Gonzalo Higuaín became the third highest football transfer of all-time and highest ever transfer for an Italian club, at the time, when he signed for €90 million from Napoli.

On 8 August 2016, Paul Pogba returned to his first club, Manchester United, for the former record for highest football transfer fee at €105 million, surpassing the previous record holder Gareth Bale.

On 10 July 2018, Cristiano Ronaldo became the highest ever transfer for an Italian club with his €100 million transfer from Real Madrid.

== See also ==
=== Honours ===
- Juventus FC Reserves and Academy honours

=== Statistics and records ===
- Football records and statistics in Italy
- UEFA club competition records and statistics
- List of Juventus FC seasons
