= Borrell =

Borrell (Eastern Catalan: [buˈreʎ]) is a common surname in modern Catalan language, and was also a given name in the past. It can refer to:

- Alfons Borrell i Palazón (1931–2020), Catalan painter
- Andrea Borrell (born 1963), Cuban basketball player
- Borrell of Ausona (died 820), first count of Cerdanya
- Borrell II of Barcelona (died 992), Count of Barcelona
- Borrell I of Pallars (died 995), Count of Pallars
- Borrell (died 1018), bishop of Vic
- Dick Borrell (born 1951), American politician, businessman, and educator
- Emily Borrell (born 1992), Cuban volleyball player
- Federico Borrell García (died 1936), Spanish Republican soldier of the Spanish Civil War
- Francisco Mora y Borrell, 19th century Catalan-American priest
- Henry Perigal Borrell (1795–1851), British numismatist.
- Johnny Borrell (born 1980), British musician
- Josep Borrell (born 1947), Spanish politician, High Representative of the European Union 2019–2024.
- Lazaro Borrell (born 1972), Cuban athlete
- Pedro Borrell (born 1944), Dominican architect and archeologist
- Pere Borrell del Caso (1835–1910), Catalan painter
- Ramon Borrell, Count of Barcelona, count of Barcelona, Girona, and Ausona from 992.
- Teresa Borrell (born 1962), New Zealand sports shooter

== See also ==
- Borel (disambiguation)
- Borrel
