= Ramella =

Ramella is an Italian surname. Notable people with the surname include:

- Elvina Ramella (1927–2007), Italian operatic soprano
- Ernestino Ramella (born 1955), Italian footballer and manager
- Fabio Ramella, Swiss sport shooter
- Luciano Ramella (1914–1990), Italian footballer
