= Palazón =

Palazón is a surname. Notable people with the surname include:

- Alfons Borrell i Palazón (1931–2020), Spanish painter
- Isi Palazón (born 1994), Spanish footballer
