= Scaramelli =

Scaramelli is an Italian surname. Notable people with the surname include:

- Álvaro Scaramelli, Chilean singer
- Franco Scaramelli (1911–?), Italian footballer
- Giovanni Battista Scaramelli (1687–1752), Italian Jesuit, ethicist and writer
- Giovanni Carlo Scaramelli (1550-1608), Venetian diplomat
