= Borrel =

Borrel is a surname. Notable people with the surname include:

- Amédée Borrel (1867–1936), French biologist who was born in Cazouls-lès-Béziers
- Andrée Borrel (1919–1944), French heroine of World War II
- Cleopatra Borrel (born 1979), female shotputter from Trinidad and Tobago
- José Borrel Tudurí
- Josep Borrell (born 1947), Spanish and EU politician
- Wilfred II Borrel, count of Barcelona, Girona, and Ausona from 897 to 911

== See also ==
- Borel (disambiguation)
- Borrell (disambiguation)
