= 1933–34 Serie A =

33rd season of top-tier Italian football

Serie A
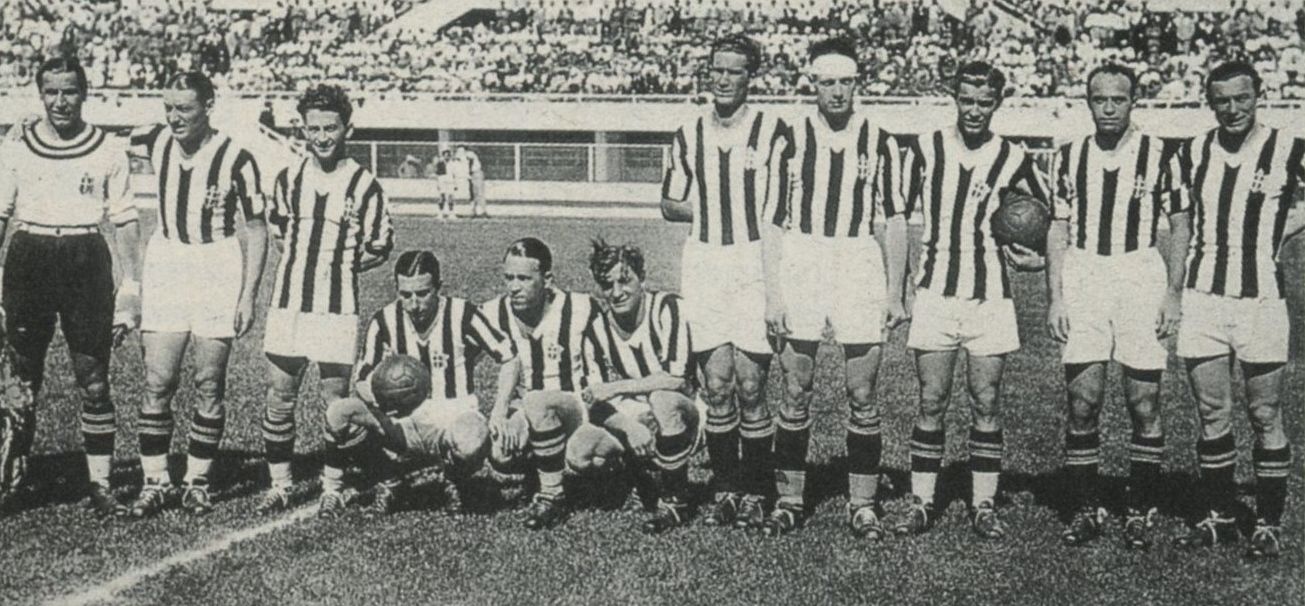
- The 1933–34 Serie A winning Juventus squad
- Season: 1933–34
- Champions: Juventus; 6th title
- Relegated: Padova; Genoa; Casale
- Matches: 306
- Goals: 844 (2.76 per match)
- Top goalscorer: Felice Borel (32 goals)

The 1933-34 Serie A was the thirty-fourth edition of the Italian Football Championship and its fifth season since 1929 re-branding to create Serie A. It was the eleventh season from which the Italian Football Champions adorned their team jerseys in the subsequent season with a Scudetto. Juventus were champions for the fourth of five successive seasons and for the sixth time in their history. This was their fifth scudetto since the scudetto started being awarded in 1924 and their fourth win contested as Serie A.

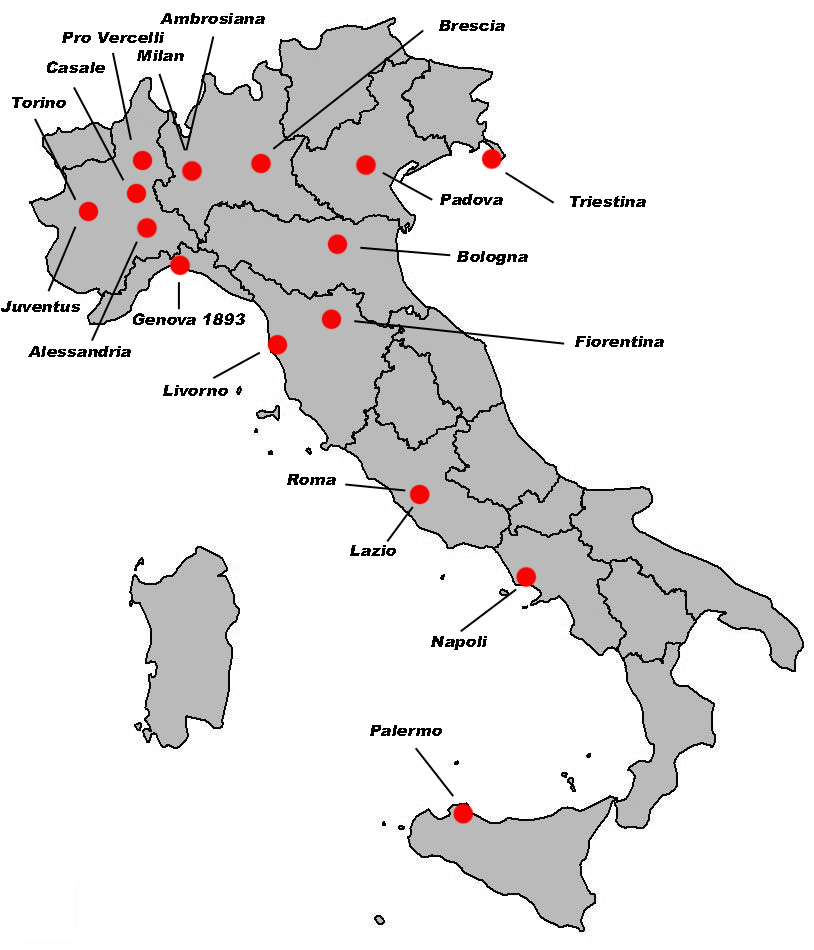
Serie A 1933–34 teams distribution

== Teams ==
Livorno and Brescia had been promoted from Serie B.

== Events ==
A temporary relegation spot was added to reduce the league.

== Final classification ==
| Pos | Team | Pld | W | D | L | GF | GA | GD | Pts | Qualification or relegation |
|---|---|---|---|---|---|---|---|---|---|---|
| 1 | Juventus (C) | 34 | 23 | 7 | 4 | 88 | 31 | +57 | 53 | 1934 Mitropa Cup |
| 2 | Ambrosiana-Inter | 34 | 20 | 9 | 5 | 66 | 24 | +42 | 49 | 1934 Mitropa Cup |
| 3 | Napoli | 34 | 19 | 8 | 7 | 46 | 30 | +16 | 46 | 1934 Mitropa Cup |
| 4 | Bologna | 34 | 16 | 10 | 8 | 53 | 33 | +20 | 42 | 1934 Mitropa Cup |
| 5 | Roma | 34 | 16 | 8 | 10 | 56 | 32 | +24 | 40 | |
| 6 | Fiorentina | 34 | 12 | 12 | 10 | 46 | 53 | −7 | 36 | |
| 7 | Pro Vercelli | 34 | 12 | 10 | 12 | 41 | 37 | +4 | 34 | |
| 7 | Livorno | 34 | 11 | 12 | 11 | 47 | 45 | +2 | 34 | |
| 9 | Milan | 34 | 12 | 9 | 13 | 50 | 49 | +1 | 33 | |
| 10 | Lazio | 34 | 11 | 9 | 14 | 48 | 66 | −18 | 31 | |
| 11 | Triestina | 34 | 10 | 10 | 14 | 38 | 40 | −2 | 30 | |
| 12 | Brescia | 34 | 11 | 7 | 16 | 39 | 47 | −8 | 29 | |
| 12 | Torino | 34 | 9 | 11 | 14 | 47 | 57 | −10 | 29 | |
| 12 | Alessandria | 34 | 12 | 5 | 17 | 43 | 54 | −11 | 29 | |
| 12 | Palermo | 34 | 10 | 9 | 15 | 39 | 51 | −12 | 29 | |
| 16 | Padova (R) | 34 | 9 | 9 | 16 | 32 | 49 | −17 | 27 | Relegation to Serie B |
| 17 | Genova 1893 (R) | 34 | 8 | 8 | 18 | 33 | 55 | −22 | 24 | Relegation to Serie B |
| 18 | Casale (R) | 34 | 4 | 9 | 21 | 32 | 91 | −59 | 17 | Relegation to Serie B |

Source: Panini
(C) Champions; (R) Relegated

== Results ==
| Home \ Away | ALE | AMB | BOL | BRE | CSL | FIO | GEN | JUV | LAZ | LIV | MIL | NAP | PAD | PAL | PVE | ROM | TOR | TRI |
|---|---|---|---|---|---|---|---|---|---|---|---|---|---|---|---|---|---|---|
| Alessandria | | 0–2 | 2–2 | 1–0 | 4–1 | 3–1 | 3–1 | 2–1 | 3–2 | 2–1 | 1–1 | 1–0 | 3–0 | 2–1 | 0–1 | 1–1 | 3–1 | 1–0 |
| Ambrosiana-Inter | 4–1 | | 2–0 | 1–0 | 9–0 | 2–4 | 5–0 | 3–2 | 8–1 | 1–2 | 3–0 | 2–1 | 1–0 | 3–1 | 2–0 | 0–0 | 0–0 | 2–1 |
| Bologna | 4–1 | 0–1 | | 4–1 | 2–0 | 0–0 | 3–0 | 2–2 | 0–0 | 1–0 | 2–1 | 3–0 | 3–0 | 4–1 | 4–1 | 1–0 | 2–2 | 2–0 |
| Brescia | 2–1 | 1–1 | 1–2 | | 3–1 | 4–0 | 3–1 | 1–2 | 0–0 | 1–1 | 3–0 | 1–1 | 1–0 | 1–1 | 1–0 | 1–0 | 1–0 | 3–2 |
| Casale | 2–1 | 0–1 | 0–3 | 1–0 | | 2–2 | 2–1 | 0–3 | 1–1 | 4–4 | 0–0 | 1–4 | 0–0 | 2–2 | 1–1 | 0–2 | 3–2 | 1–1 |
| Fiorentina | 0–0 | 1–0 | 3–0 | 2–0 | 2–2 | | 2–1 | 2–2 | 2–0 | 1–0 | 1–0 | 0–1 | 3–0 | 4–1 | 1–1 | 1–3 | 1–1 | 1–1 |
| Genova 1893 | 1–0 | 0–0 | 1–0 | 3–1 | 5–0 | 1–2 | | 0–2 | 1–2 | 2–0 | 2–2 | 1–1 | 1–0 | 1–1 | 3–0 | 1–0 | 2–2 | 0–1 |
| Juventus | 3–1 | 0–0 | 4–1 | 5–1 | 6–1 | 5–0 | 8–1 | | 2–2 | 4–1 | 4–0 | 2–0 | 5–1 | 1–1 | 3–0 | 3–1 | 4–0 | 1–1 |
| Lazio | 1–0 | 1–4 | 3–3 | 3–2 | 2–1 | 2–2 | 3–2 | 0–2 | | 3–0 | 4–0 | 0–2 | 3–2 | 1–0 | 1–1 | 3–3 | 1–0 | 2–0 |
| Livorno | 3–2 | 2–2 | 0–0 | 0–0 | 5–0 | 3–0 | 0–0 | 0–0 | 4–1 | | 4–0 | 0–1 | 3–1 | 3–2 | 1–1 | 1–3 | 2–0 | 2–1 |
| Milan | 3–0 | 1–2 | 1–1 | 4–0 | 6–2 | 2–0 | 1–0 | 3–1 | 4–2 | 3–1 | | 0–2 (Note: Decided by the FIGC.) | 2–2 | 1–0 | 2–0 | 1–0 | 4–0 | 0–1 |
| Napoli | 2–1 | 2–1 | 1–0 | 1–0 | 2–1 | 1–1 | 0–0 | 2–0 | 2–1 | 0–0 | 1–0 | | 1–1 | 3–0 | 1–0 | 1–2 | 5–2 | 2–0 |
| Padova | 1–0 | 1–2 | 0–0 | 2–1 | 2–0 | 0–0 | 0–0 | 1–2 | 2–0 | 1–1 | 0–0 | 3–1 | | 3–1 | 1–1 | 1–0 | 1–0 | 2–0 |
| Palermo | 2–1 | 1–1 | 2–1 | 2–2 | 3–0 | 0–0 | 2–0 | 0–1 | 1–0 | 3–2 | 2–1 | 1–2 | 2–1 | | 2–1 | 0–0 | 0–0 | 2–1 |
| Pro Vercelli | 1–0 | 0–0 | 2–0 | 2–1 | 4–1 | 7–2 | 2–0 | 0–2 | 2–0 | 0–0 | 2–1 | 0–0 | 4–0 | 3–0 | | 1–2 | 1–0 | 1–1 |
| Roma | 5–1 | 0–1 | 0–1 | 2–1 | 1–0 | 2–1 | 3–0 | 2–3 | 5–0 | 0–0 | 1–1 | 1–2 | 2–0 | 2–1 | 2–0 | | 4–0 | 0–0 |
| Torino | 1–1 | 1–0 | 0–1 | 1–0 | 5–2 | 4–1 | 3–1 | 1–2 | 1–1 | 5–0 | 3–3 | 0–0 | 4–2 | 2–1 | 0–0 | 3–6 | | 2–1 |
| Triestina | 3–0 | 0–0 | 1–1 | 0–1 | 2–0 | 2–3 | 1–0 | 0–1 | 4–2 | 0–1 | 2–2 | 4–1 | 2–1 | 1–0 | 2–1 | 1–1 | 1–1 | |

Source: Almanacco Illustrato del Calcio – La Storia 1898–2004, Panini Edizioni, Modena, September 2005 (in Italian)
Legend: Blue = home team win; Yellow = draw; Red = away team win.

== Top goalscorers ==
| Rank | Player | Club | Goals |
|---|---|---|---|
| 1 | (Italy) Felice Borel | Juventus | 31 |
| 2 | (Italy) Giovanni Busoni | Livorno | 24 |
| 3 | (Italy) Giuseppe Meazza | Ambrosiana-Inter | 21 |
| 3 | (Italy) Antonio Vojak | Napoli | 21 |
| 5 | (Italy) Giovanni Ferrari | Juventus | 16 |
| 5 | (Italy) Alfredo Notti | Alessandria | 16 |
| 5 | (Italy) Pietro Arcari | Milan | 16 |
| 5 | (Italy) Nereo Rocco | Triestina | 16 |
| 5 | (Italy) Vinicio Viani | Fiorentina | 16 |
| 10 | (Italy) Silvio Piola | Pro Vercelli | 15 |
| 10 | (Argentina) (Italy) Enrique Guaita | Roma | 15 |
| 12 | (Uruguay) (Italy) Francisco Fedullo | Bologna | 14 |
| 13 | (Argentina) (Italy) Alejandro Scopelli | Roma | 13 |
| 14 | (Argentina) (Italy) Attilio Demaría | Ambrosiana-Inter | 12 |
| 14 | (Italy) Renato Cattaneo | Alessandria | 12 |
| 14 | (Italy) Aldo Borel | Palermo | 12 |
| 17 | (Italy) Onesto Silano | Torino | 11 |
| 17 | (Italy) Filippo Prato | Torino | 11 |
| 17 | (Brazil) Filó | Lazio | 11 |

== References and sources ==
- Almanacco Illustrato del Calcio – La Storia 1898–2004, Panini Edizioni, Modena, September 2005
