= Gastone Prendato =

Italian footballer and coach

Personal information
- Date of birth: 4 March 1910
- Place of birth: Padua, Italy
- Date of death: 27 October 1980 (aged 70)
- Position: Striker

Senior career*
Years	Team	Apps	(Gls)
1927–1928	Tita Fumei Padova		
1928–1931	Padova	96	(45)
1931–1935	Fiorentina	81	(20)
1935–1936	Juventus	11	(0)
1936–1937	Roma	10	(2)
1937–1938	Padova	20	(5)
1938–1941	Sandonà		
1941–1943	Trento		
1945–1946	Ravenna	1	(0)

Managerial career
- Sandonà
- 1951–1952: Padova
- 1955–1957: Trapani
- 1958–1960: Cosenza
- 1961–1962: Trapani
- * Club domestic league appearances and goals

Gastone Prendato (4 March 1910 in Padua – 27 October 1980) was an Italian professional football player and coach.
