= Raymond Borel =

French doctor

Raymond Borel is a French doctor, editor of the medical journal TONUS and one of the founders of Médecins Sans Frontières.

Borel had founded an aid organization called Secours Médical Français ("French Medical Relief") in response to the 1970 Bhola cyclone. In December 1971, this group merged with Groupe d'Intervention Médicale et Chirurgicale en Urgence, to form the single organization Médicins Sans Frontières.
