= Ernesto Borel =

Italian footballer (1889-1951)

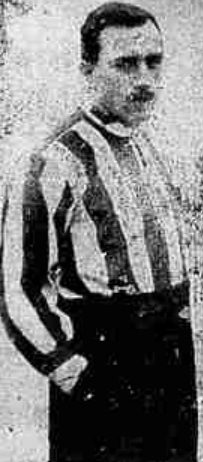

Personal information
- Full name: Ernesto Borel
- Date of birth: 26 July 1889
- Place of birth: Turin, Italy
- Date of death: 5 October 1951 (aged 62)
- Position: Forward

Youth career
- 1905–1906: Juventus

Senior career*
Years	Team	Apps	(Gls)
1906–1914	Juventus	27	(18)
1914–1919	Cannes		
1919–1921	Biellese	3	(0)
- * Club domestic league appearances and goals

Ernesto Borel (26 July 1889 – 5 October 1951) was an Italian professional footballer who played as a forward.

As a footballer, Borel first played for Juventus and was the first Juve player to score in the Derby della Mole. On 14 November 1909, Borel scored a brace for Juve in a 2–0 win in the first ever Derby d'Italia. He briefly played in France with AS Cannes, before returning to Italy with A.S.D. La Biellese.

== Personal life ==
Ernesto was the father of Aldo, and 1934 FIFA World Cup winner Felice Borel, who were both professional footballers who played for Juventus.
