= Borel (author) =

Borel (18th-century, Rouen – ? ) was an 18th-century French playwright from Normandy.

Already made known by some poetic essays and an epigram in Latin entitled Nicetas, crowned by the Académie des Palinods in 1749, Borel addressed the dramatic genre with a play, le Méfiant ("The distrustful"), comedy in five acts and in verse, premiered in Paris at the Comédie Italienne, 20 December 1785, where it was well received.

Despite this happy first attempt in literary career, the silence of the biographies on Borel from that time suggests he stopped there.

== Works ==
- 1786: Le Méfiant, comédie en 5 actes et en vers, Paris, Cailleau.

== Sources ==
- Théodore-Éloi Lebreton, Biographie rouennaise, Rouen, Le Brument, 1865, (p. 46-7).
