= Lino Cason =

Italian footballer

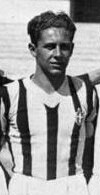

Personal information
- Date of birth: 27 October 1914
- Place of birth: Maserada sul Piave, Kingdom of Italy
- Height: 1.70 m (5 ft 7 in)
- Position: Midfielder

Senior career*
Years	Team	Apps	(Gls)
1934–1937	Juventus	30	(7)
1937–1939	Bari	26	(6)
1939–1941	Vigevano		
1941–1942	Baratta Battipaglia		
1942–1943	Salernitana		
- * Club domestic league appearances and goals

Lino Cason (born 27 October 1914) was an Italian professional football player.

== Honours ==
- Serie A champion: 1934/35
