= Attilio Bulgheri =

Italian footballer (1913–1995)

Personal information
- Date of birth: March 9, 1913
- Place of birth: Piombino, Italy
- Date of death: December 23, 1995 (aged 82)
- Place of death: Livorno, Italy
- Height: 1.73 m (5 ft 8 in)
- Position: Goalkeeper

Senior career*
Years	Team	Apps	(Gls)
1933–1934	Grosseto	25	(0)
1934–1935	Juventus	0	(0)
1935–1939	Livorno	73	(0)
1939–1941	Alessandria	19	(0)
1941–1942	Juventus	1	(0)
1945–1946	Venturina		
- * Club domestic league appearances and goals

Attilio Bulgheri (9 March 1913 – 23 December 1995) was an Italian professional footballer who played as a goalkeeper.
