= André Borel d'Hauterive =

French historian and librarian

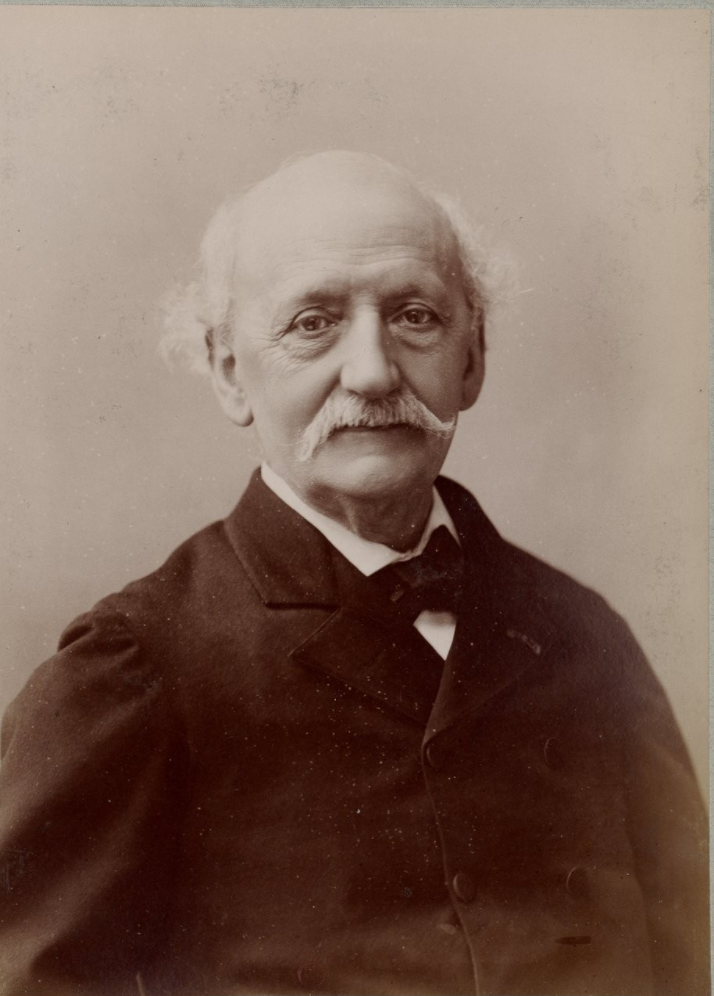
- Born: André-François-Joseph Borel; 3 July 1812; Lyon
- Died: 16 March 1896 (aged 83); Paris
- Occupations: Historian; Librarian

André Borel d'Hauterive (3 July 1812 – 16 March 1896), also known by the pen name André-François-Joseph Borel, was a 19th-century French historian and librarian.

== Biography ==
The son of André Borel and Magdeleine Victoire Garnaud, he was one among 14 children. The romantic poet Pétrus Borel was his brother.

A student at the École des chartes class 1835, he graduated as archivist-paleographer in 1837.

First attached to the historical work of the Ministry of Education, he became secretary of the École des chartes (May 1849), librarian at the Sainte-Geneviève Library (1864) and assistant curator of the manuscript department of the Bibliothèque nationale (1 January 1874). He was director of the Revue historique de la noblesse.

== Works ==
From 1842, André Borel d'Hauterive wrote the Annuaire de la Pairie et de la Noblesse de France et des maisons souveraines de l'Europe.

He also wrote under the pseudonyms Carl Egger, Ernest Valery, Adrien Moreau, Hippolyte Raineval and Mattéphile Lerob.
