= Vittorio Staccione =

Italian footballer

Personal information
- Date of birth: 9 April 1904
- Place of birth: Turin, Kingdom of Italy
- Date of death: 16 March 1945 (aged 40)
- Place of death: Mauthausen-Gusen, Austria
- Height: 1.71 m (5 ft 7 1/2 in)
- Position: Midfielder

Youth career
- 1919–1924: Torino

Senior career*
Years	Team	Apps	(Gls)
1924–1927	Torino	20	
1924–1925	→ Cremonese (loan)	25	
1927–1931	Fiorentina	94	
1931–1934	Cosenza	77	
1934–1935	Savoia	2	
Total		218	
- * Club domestic league appearances and goals

Vittorio Staccione (9 April 1904 – 16 March 1945) was an Italian professional footballer who played as a midfielder.

== Early and personal life ==
Staccione was born in Turin; his younger brother, Eugenio was also a professional footballer. His wife, Giulia, died in 1930 following the complications from the delivery of a stillborn child.

== Career ==
In his youth, Mazzoni played for Torino.

In his senior career, Staccione played for Torino (1924–1927), Cremonese (on loan from Torino during the 1924–25 season), Fiorentina (1927–1931), Cosenza (1931–1934), and Savoia (1934–1935).

During his time at Torino, he contributed to winning the 1926–27 Divisione Nazionale which was later stripped following allegations of bribery.

== Later life and death ==
After retiring from football, Staccione worked as a labourer for Fiat.

Staccione was a noted anti-fascist. During his time at Savoia, he was regularly accosted by fascist personnel. He was arrested by the SS in March 1944 and died at the Mauthausen-Gusen concentration camp in March 1945.

In 2012, he was inducted into ACF Fiorentina Hall of Fame.
