= Alberto Tiberti =

Italian footballer (born 1911)

Personal information
- Date of birth: 10 August 1911
- Place of birth: Genoa, Italy
- Date of death: 7 April 1977 (aged 65)
- Position: Midfielder

Senior career*
Years	Team	Apps	(Gls)
1931–1934	Perugia		
1934–1935	Juventus	2	(0)
1935–1936	Brescia	5	(0)
1938–1939	Asti		
- * Club domestic league appearances and goals

Alberto Tiberti (10 August 1911 – 7 April 1977) was an Italian professional footballer.

== Honours ==
- Serie A champion: 1934/35
