= Renato Bodini =

Italian footballer (1909–1974)

Personal information
- Date of birth: October 1, 1909
- Place of birth: Cremona, Italy
- Date of death: August 23, 1974 (aged 64)
- Place of death: Rome, Italy
- Height: 1.75 m (5 ft 9 in)
- Position: Defender

Senior career*
Years	Team	Apps	(Gls)
1927–1930	Cremonese	48	(3)
1930–1935	Roma	139	(3)
1935–1937	Sampierdarenese	48	(8)
1937–1938	Milan	2	(0)
1938–1940	Liguria	50	(5)
1940–1941	Savona	13	(3)
1941–1942	Lucchese	18	(3)
1942–1943	Cremonese	10	(0)

Managerial career
- 1945–1946: Piacenza
- Mantova
- Cremonese
- Roma (assistant/youth)
- Siena
- Reggina
- Acireale
- * Club domestic league appearances and goals

Renato Bodini (October 1, 1909 – August 23, 1974) was an Italian professional football player and coach.

He played for 11 seasons (270 games, 18 goals) in the Serie A for U.S. Cremonese, A.S. Roma, Sampierdarenese, A.C. Milan and A.C. Liguria.

He became first-team regular in his first season for A.S. Roma despite his young age. His first league goal for Roma was an 88th-minute equalizer against S.S. Lazio in a Derby della Capitale game.

His older brother Ercole Bodini also played football professionally. To distinguish them, Ercole was referred to as Bodini I and Renato as Bodini II.
