= Armando Diena =

Italian footballer (1914-1985)

Personal information
- Date of birth: 8 April 1914
- Place of birth: Turin, Italy
- Date of death: 1 July 1985 (aged 71)
- Place of death: Genoa, Italy
- Position: Midfielder

Senior career*
Years	Team	Apps	(Gls)
1930–1933	Juventus		
1933–1934	Novara	3	(0)
1934–1936	Juventus	13	(1)
1936–1937	Ambrosiana-Inter	0	(0)
- * Club domestic league appearances and goals

Armando Diena (8 April 1914 – 1 July 1985), also known as Diena II, was an Italian professional football midfielder. He played for the Juventus national football team from 1930 to 1933 and again from 1934 to 1936.

Diena died on 1 July 1985, at the age of 71.

== Honours ==
- Serie A champion: 1934/35.
