= Luciano Ramella =

Italian footballer

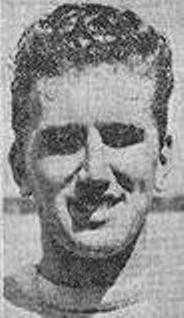

Personal information
- Date of birth: April 10, 1914
- Place of birth: Pollone, Italy
- Date of death: 1990
- Place of death: Tomazina, Brazil
- Height: 1.75 m (5 ft 9 in)
- Position: Midfielder

Senior career*
Years	Team	Apps	(Gls)
1933–1934	Imperia		
1934–1936	Juventus	2	(0)
1936–1938	Pro Vercelli	64	(4)
1938–1944	Lazio	139	(5)
1944–1946	Como	42	(0)
1946–1948	Lazio	1	(0)
- * Club domestic league appearances and goals

Luciano Ramella (April 10, 1914, in Pollone – 1990 in Tomazina) was an Italian professional football player.

== Honours ==
- Serie A champion: 1934/35
