= Felice Borel =

Italian footballer (1914–1993)

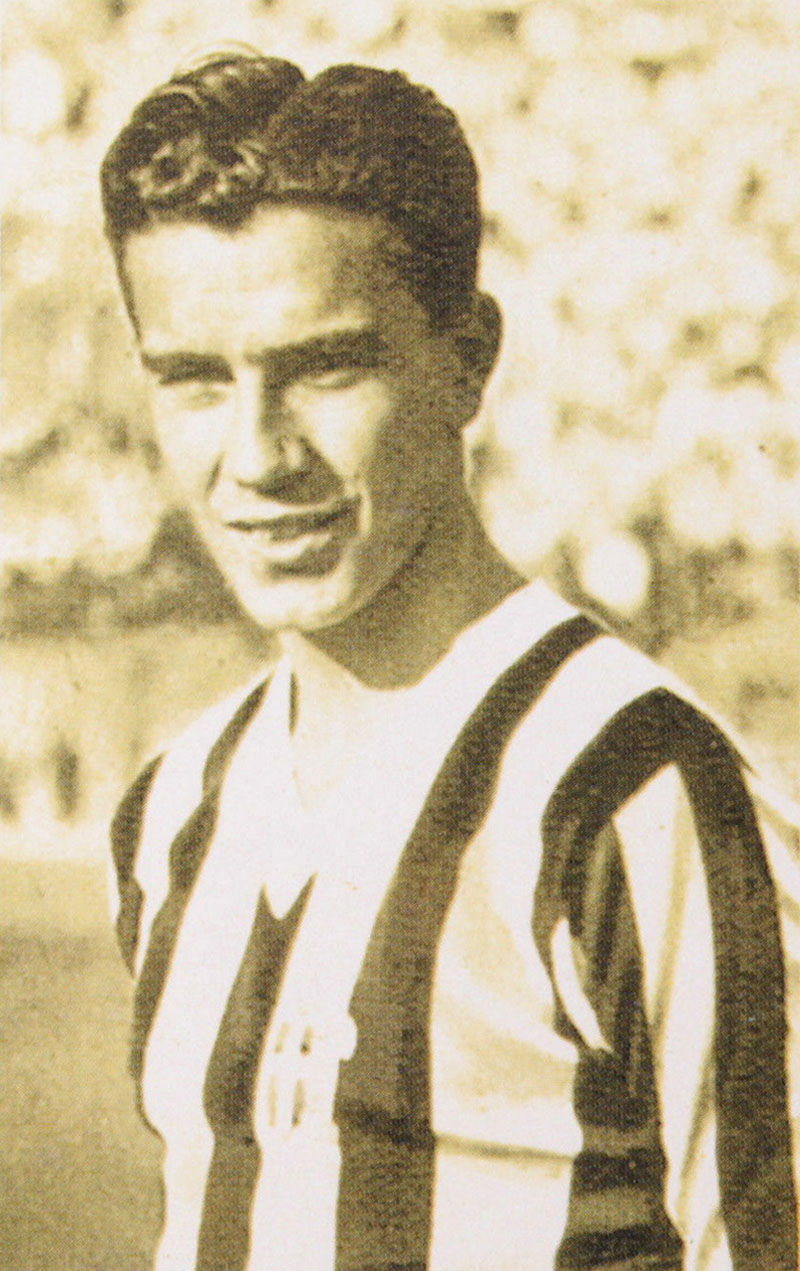
- Borel II with Juventus in the 1930s

Personal information
- Full name: Felice Placido Borel II
- Date of birth: 5 April 1914
- Place of birth: Nice, France
- Date of death: 21 February 1993 (aged 78)
- Place of death: Turin, Italy
- Height: 1.75 m (5 ft 9 in)
- Position: Forward

Senior career*
Years	Team	Apps	(Gls)
1932–1941	Juventus	205	(119)
1941–1942	Torino	25	(7)
1942–1946	Juventus	75	(24)
1946–1947	US Alessandria	1	(0)
1948–1949	Napoli	1	(0)
Total		307	(150)

International career
1933–1934	Italy	3	(1)

Managerial career
- 1942–1946: Juventus
- 1946–1947: Alessandria
- 1948–1949: Napoli
- 1954: Cenisia (technical director)
- 1954–1956: Fossanese
- 1958–1959: Catania (technical director)
- 1966–1967: Ternana
Medal record
Italy
FIFA World Cup
Gold medal – first place	1934 Italy
Central European International Cup
Gold medal – first place	1933–35 Central European International Cup
- * Club domestic league appearances and goals

Felice Placido Borel (Italian pronunciation: [feˈliːtʃe boˈrɛl]; 5 April 1914 – 21 February 1993) was an Italian footballer who played as a striker. He was a member of the Italy national team that won the 1934 FIFA World Cup.

== Club career ==
Borel was born in Nice, France. During his career, he played for Juventus and cross-city rivals Torino in Serie A and, in Serie B, for Alessandria, and finally for Napoli, where he finished his career.

He scored 158 goals for Juventus, winning three Serie A titles (1933, 1934, and 1935) and a Coppa Italia (1938) during his time with the club, as well as the Capocannoniere on two occasions (1933 and 1934); he is currently Juventus's sixth highest goal scorer. During his second spell with the club in the 1940s, he held the position of player-manager.

He still holds the record for most goals, in winning the Capocannoniere title, in Serie A while playing for Juventus with 31 goals. Although Ferenc Hirzer still holds the record for most goals in winning the Capocannoniere, in the Best Italian League while playing for Juventus with 35 goals (in 24 matches) but then it was called Prima Divisione.

== International career ==
Borel made three appearances for the Italy national team between 1933 and 1934, scoring his only international goal on his debut against Hungary on 22 November, in Budapest, during the gold winning 1933–35 Central European International Cup campaign. He was part of the 1934 FIFA World Cup winning national team, appearing once throughout the tournament, during the quarter-final victory over Spain on 1 June.

== Style of play ==
Nicknamed farfallino ("little butterfly," in Italian), Borel usually played as a centre forward, and is regarded as one of Italy's and Juventus's greatest forwards of all time. He was known for his speed, movement, shooting, goalscoring, dribbling, team-play, and technical ability. In his later career he usually played as an inside forward or mezzala, or even as an offensive–minded central midfielder. Despite his ability, however, he was also injury prone.

== After retirement ==
During the 1958–59 season, he was technical director of Catania.

== Personal life ==
Felice's older brother Aldo Borel played football professionally, spending 10 seasons in the Serie A, and their father Ernesto Borel played for Biellese, AS Cannes and Juventus in the 1900s and 1910s, and later also served as a manager. To distinguish the brothers, Aldo was known as Borel I and Felice - as Borel II.

== Honours ==
Juventus

- Serie A: 1932–33, 1933–34, 1934–35
- Coppa Italia: 1937–38

Italy

- FIFA World Cup: 1934
- Central European International Cup: 1933–35

Individual

- Capocannoniere: 1932–33 (29 goals), 1933–34 (31 goals)
- Juventus FC Hall of Fame: 2025
