= Alfons Borrell i Palazón =

Spanish painter (1931–2020)

Alfons Borrell
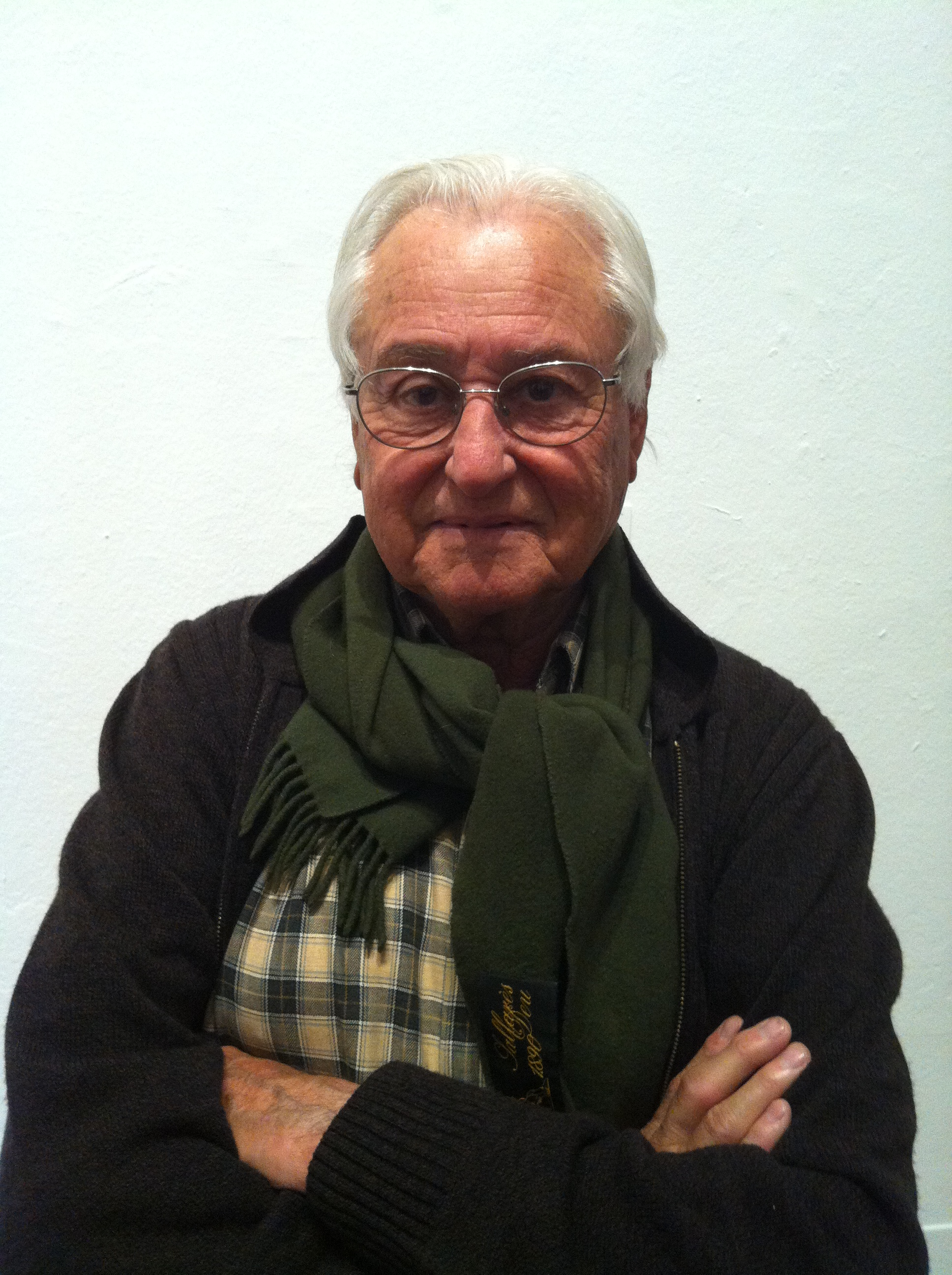
- Alfons Borrell at Fundació Joan Miró (2014)
- Born: 3 June 1931; Barcelona, Catalonia, Spain
- Died: 6 October 2020 (aged 89); Sabadell
- Other name: Alfons Borrell
- Occupation: Artist

Alfons Borrell i Palazón (3 June 1931 – 6 October 2020) was a Spanish abstract painter.

== Life ==
Alfons Borrell was born in Barcelona in 1931. At the age of nine, his family moved to Sabadell. After several casual jobs in 1950 he completed his military service in Port de Pollença (Mallorca), where he attended the workshop of Hermen Anglada Camarasa. Back in Sabadell in 1952, he worked in the family jewelry store. In Barcelona, he took two free courses in life drawing at the Escola de Belles Arts de Sant Jordi drawing school, where in 1953 he met the woman who would become his wife, Rosa. In 1955 Borrell evolved from the figurative to abstract painting. The same year, he participated with Joaquim Montserrat in the creation of the Sala d'Art Actual Art Gallery in Sabadell and helped to create the Academy of Fine Arts of Sabadell. In 1957 he worked on the Riutort magazine directed by Andreu Castells, in Sabadell. In 1959 he met Juan-Eduardo Cirlot, to whom he later devoted an essay.

In 1969 he joined the Grup Gallot (Gallot Group) with Antonio Angle, Llorenç Balsach i Grau, Joan Josep Bermúdez, Manuel Duque, Josep Llorens, Joaquim Montserrat and Lluís Vila Plana following the current trend of the action Painting. This consisted of performing various actions on the street, both in Sabadell and Barcelona. Invited by the art critic Cirici Pellicer, he participated in the inaugural exhibition of the first Barcelona Museum of Contemporary Art at the top of Cinema Coliseum. He was married to Rosa for years and they had three children.

Borrell died on 6 October 2020, aged 89.

== Solo exhibits ==
- 1978 – Espai 10, Fundació Joan Miró, Barcelona.
- 1979 – Galeria Joan Prats Gallery, Barcelona.
- 1987 – Galérie Anne Marie de Sacy, Paris.
- 1988 – New York Exhibitions, New York
- 1990 – Francony Gallery, Tokyo, Lucy Berman Gallery, Palo Alto, California.
- 1996 – Alfons Borrell o l'aura de pintura, travelling exhibit, several museums ins Catalonia
- 2006 – Alfons Borrell o la celebració del color, Centre Cultural Tecla Sala, l'Hospitalet de Llobregat.
- 2007 – Alfons Borrell o la celebració del color, Museu d'Art de Sabadell, Sabadell, Catalonia.
- 2011 – Alfons Borrell. Obra sobre paper 1956-2010, Fundació Palau, Caldes d'Estrac, Catalonia.
- 2013 – Alfons Borrell. Obra sobre paper 1956-2010, Museu d'Art de Sabadell.
- 2015 – Alfons Borrell. Els treballs i els dies, Fundació Joan Miró, Barcelona.

== Awards ==
- 2014 - GAC Award
