= Eugenio Staccione =

Italian footballer (1909-1967)

Personal information
- Date of birth: 14 April 1909
- Place of birth: Turin, Kingdom of Italy
- Date of death: 5 May 1967 (aged 58)
- Place of death: Turin, Italy
- Height: 1.75 m (5 ft 9 in)
- Position: Goalkeeper

Youth career
- 1922–1925: Torino

Senior career*
Years	Team	Apps	(Gls)
1925–1931	Torino	14	(0)
1927–1929	→ Casale (loan)	37	(0)
1931–1934	Messina	64	(0)
1934–1937	Juventus	0	(0)
1937–1940	Valle d'Aosta	75	(0)
Total		190	(0)
- * Club domestic league appearances and goals

Eugenio Staccione (14 April 1909 – 5 May 1967) was an Italian professional footballer who played as a goalkeeper.

== Early and personal life ==
Staccione was born in Turin; his older brother, Vittorio was also a professional footballer.

== Career ==
Staccione played for Torino, Casale, Messina, Juventus and Valle d'Aosta.

== Later life and death ==
After retiring from football, Staccione worked as a labourer for FIAT. He died in 1967.
