= Franco Scaramelli =

Italian footballer

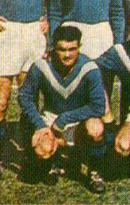
- Scaramelli with Brescia in the 1940–41 season

Personal information
- Date of birth: October 8, 1911
- Place of birth: Modena, Italy
- Date of death: February 26, 1995
- Height: 1.72 m (5 ft 7 1/2 in)
- Position: Midfielder

Senior career*
Years	Team	Apps	(Gls)
1929–1932	Modena	64	(17)
1932–1938	Roma	97	(10)
1938–1939	Modena	2	(0)
1939–1941	Brescia	45	(4)
- * Club domestic league appearances and goals

Franco Scaramelli (born October 8, 1911 in Modena) was an Italian professional football player. He played for 10 seasons (163 games, 27 goals) in the Serie A for Modena F.C. and A.S. Roma.

== Career ==
When he was a midfielder, he made his debut at the age of 18 in the new Serie A Modena, his hometown team, on 27 October, 1929 in a 2-2 draw away to Livorno. He played three top-flight championships with the Canaries.

In 1933-1934, he moved to Roma where he remained for six championships, where he was always in the top division.

In 1938-39, he returned to Modena, playing another season in Serie A, and then finished his career at Brescia in Serie B, where he played 44 games in two seasons, scoring four goals. He made his debut for the Swallows in Padua on October 29, 1939, in a Padova-Brescia match that ended in a resounding 0-6 defeat.
