= Aldo Borel =

Italian footballer (1912-1979)

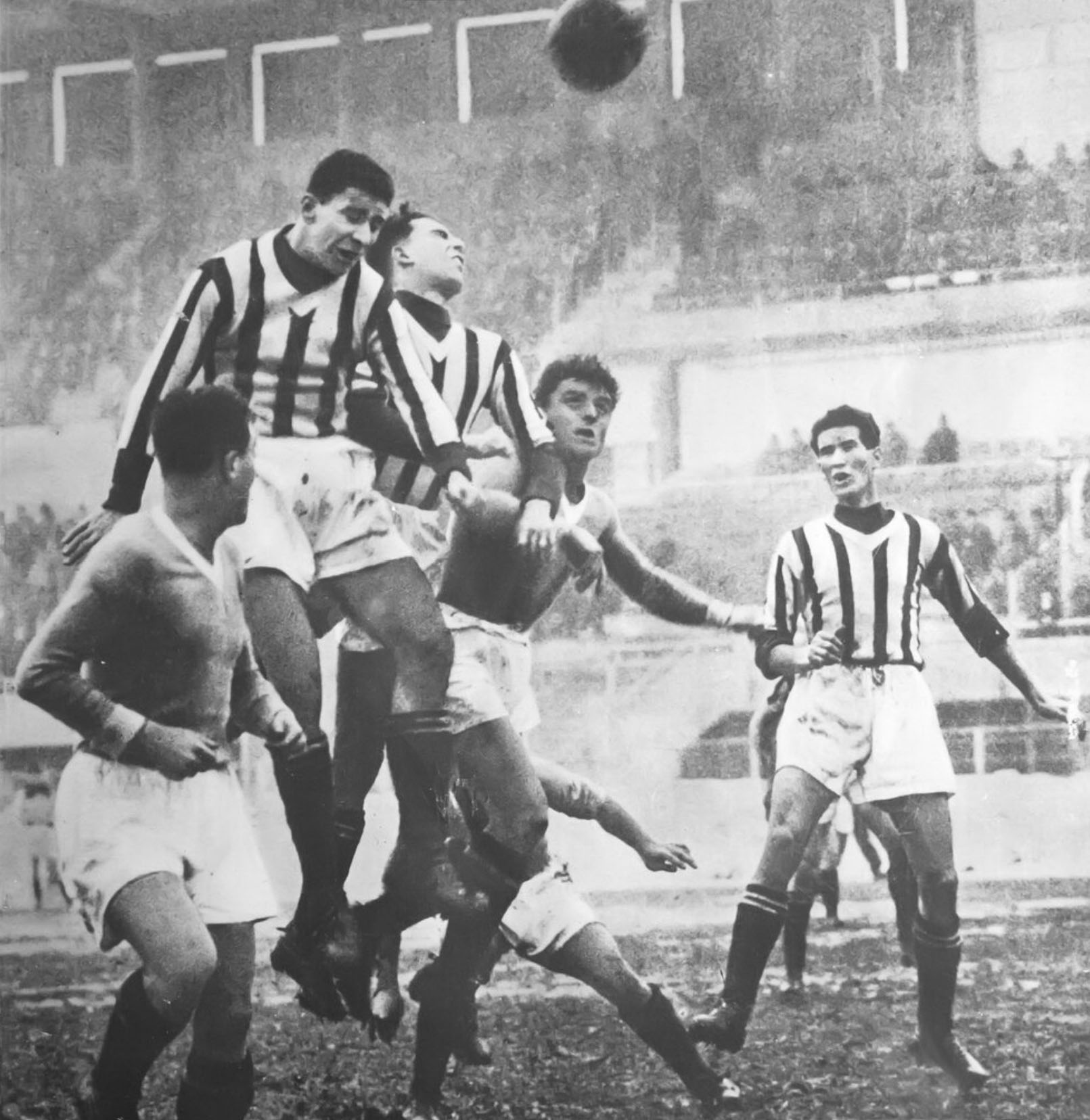
- Borel in 1937

Personal information
- Full name: Aldo Giuseppe Borel
- Date of birth: 30 May 1912
- Place of birth: Nice, France
- Date of death: 28 February 1979 (aged 66)
- Place of death: Barcelona, Spain
- Height: 1.82 m (6 ft 0 in)
- Position: Midfielder

Senior career*
Years	Team	Apps	(Gls)
1929–1931	Torino	2	(1)
1931–1932	Casale	32	(16)
1932–1933	Fiorentina	16	(9)
1933–1935	Palermo	34	(12)
1935–1938	Juventus	35	(7)
1938–1939	Novara	12	(1)
1939–1940	Savona	15	(9)
1940–1941	Omegna		
- * Club domestic league appearances and goals

Aldo Giuseppe Borel (30 May 1912 – 28 February 1979) was an Italian professional footballer who played as a midfielder.

== Career ==
Throughout his career, Borel played for Italian clubs Torino, Casale, Fiorentina, Palermo, Juventus, Novara, Savona, and Omegna.

== Personal life ==
Aldo's younger brother Felice Borel won the 1934 FIFA World Cup with the Italy national team, and their father Ernesto Borel played for Biellese, AS Cannes and Juventus FC in the 1900s and 1910s. To distinguish the brothers, Aldo was known as Borel I and Felice – as Borel II.

His first wife was an Italian actress Virginia Doglioli.
