= List of AC Milan seasons =

Associazione Calcio Milan are an Italian professional football club based in Milan, Lombardy, who currently play in the Serie A. This list details Milan's achievements in major competitions, together with the top scorers for each season.

The club has won the Scudetto nineteen times, the Coppa Italia five times, the Supercoppa Italiana eight times, the European Cup seven times, the Cup Winners' Cup twice and the European Super Cup five times.

== History ==
Milan were formed in 1899. In 1901, in only their second season, they won their first title. Two more followed in 1906 and 1907; this was their last success until the 1950–51 season, when they regained the league title after 44 years.

The club first participated in official European competitions during the 1955–56 season, entering the inaugural edition of the European Cup, a trophy that they won for the first time seven years later, in 1963. They kept proving successful during the 1960s, as they won their first Coppa Italia in 1967, their first Cup Winners' Cup the following year and their first Intercontinental Cup in 1969.

In the 1979–80 season, Milan got relegated for the first time in their history, following a match-fixing scandal. By the end of the 1980s, the club had managed to become successful again and, in the 1991–92 season, they went on to win the championship unbeaten (a feature that was never achieved before in Serie A). This was the first of three straight titles, and in the 1993–94 season, they also recorded their first European Double.

== Key ==
Key to league record:

- Pld = Matches played
- W = Matches won
- D = Matches drawn
- L = Matches lost
- GF = Goals for
- GA = Goals against
- Pts = Points
- Pos = Final position

Key to divisions:

- Serie A = Serie A
- Serie B = Serie B
- Fed = Campionato Federale
- Cat 1 = Prima Categoria
- Div 1 = Prima Divisione
- Div N = Divisione Nazionale
- Reg = Regional qualifiers

Key to rounds:

- DNE = Did not enter
- Grp = Group stage
- R1 = First round
- R2 = Second round
- KPO = Knockout phase play-offs
- R32 = Round of 32
- R16 = Round of 16
- QF = Quarter-finals
- SF = Semi-finals
- RU = Runners-up
- W = Winners

Winners	Runners-up	Promoted	Relegated	Top goalscorer in Serie A

Division shown in bold to indicate a change in division.
Top scorers shown in bold are players who were also top scorers in their division that season.

== Seasons ==
Season	League^{[A]}									Cup^{[B]}	Europe / Other		Top goalscorer(s)^{[C]}	
Season	Division	Pld	W	D	L	GF	GA	Pts	Pos	Cup^{[B]}	Europe / Other		Player(s)	Goals
1899–1900	Reg	qualified as the only participant									Medaglia del Re	**W**	David Allison	2
1899–1900	Fed	1	0	0	1	0	3	n/a	3rd		Medaglia del Re	**W**	David Allison	2
1900–01	Reg	1	1	0	0	2	0	n/a			Medaglia del Re	**W**	Ettore Negretti	3
1900–01	Fed	2	2	0	0	6	2	n/a	**1st**		Medaglia del Re	**W**	Ettore Negretti	3
1901–02	Reg	qualified as the title holder									Medaglia del Re	**W**	Herbert Kilpin Giulio Cederna	5
1901–02	Fed	1	0	0	1	0	2	n/a	2nd		Torneo FGNI	**W**	Herbert Kilpin Giulio Cederna	5
1902–03	Fed	1	0	0	1	0	2	n/a	3rd				n/a	none
1903–04	Reg	1	1	0	0	1	0	n/a			Torneo FGNI	**W**	Herbert Kilpin Umberto Scotti	1
1903–04	Cat 1	2	0	1	1	1	4	n/a	3rd		Palla Dapples	RU	Herbert Kilpin Umberto Scotti	1
1904–05	Reg	2	0	1	1	9	10	n/a			Torneo FGNI	**W**	Alessandro Trerè	3
1904–05	Cat 1	did not qualify									Palla Dapples	**W**	Alessandro Trerè	3
1905–06	Reg	2	2	0	0	6	4	n/a			Torneo FGNI	**W**	Guido Pedroni	3
1905–06	Cat 1	6	3	2	1	8	4	5	**1st**^{[D]}		Palla Dapples	**W**	Guido Pedroni	3
1906–07	Reg	2	2	0	0	7	0	n/a			Torneo FGNI	**W**	Hans Walter Imhoff	5
1906–07	Cat 1	4	2	2	0	10	3	6	**1st**		Palla Dapples	**W**	Hans Walter Imhoff	5
1907–08	did not enter ^{[E]}										Palla Dapples	**W**	Pietro Lana Carlo Hopf Luigi Forlano	2
1908–09	Reg	2	1	0	1	4	5	2	2nd		Palla Dapples	**W**	Pietro Lana Max Laich Marco Sala Attilio Trerè	1
1908–09	Cat 1	did not qualify									Palla Dapples	**W**	Pietro Lana Max Laich Marco Sala Attilio Trerè	1
1909–10	Cat 1	16	6	1	9	23	36	13	6th				Achille Brioschi	5
1910–11	Cat 1	16	10	2	4	44	19	22	2nd				Louis Van Hege	19
1911–12	Cat 1	18	14	3	1	60	10	31	2nd				Aldo Cevenini Louis Van Hege	18
1912–13	Reg	10	9	0	1	30	8	18	1st				Louis Van Hege	17
1912–13	Cat 1	10	5	2	3	21	10	12	3rd				Louis Van Hege	17
1913–14	Reg	18	11	4	3	58	19	26	3rd				Louis Van Hege	21
1913–14	Cat 1	did not qualify											Louis Van Hege	21
1914–15	Reg	10	9	1	0	52	3	19	1st				Louis Van Hege	22
1914–15	Cat 1	6	4	1	1	9	6	9	1st				Louis Van Hege	22
1914–15	Cat 1	5	0	3	2	4	9	3	4th^{[F]}				Louis Van Hege	22
1915–16	not held due to the First World War										Coppa Federale	**W**		
1916–17	not held due to the First World War										Coppa Regionale Lombarda	**W**		
1917–18	not held due to the First World War										Coppa Mauro	**W**		
1918–19	not held due to the First World War										Coppa Mauro	2nd		
1919–20	Reg	10	10	0	0	43	8	20	1st				Amedeo Varese	24
1919–20	Cat 1	10	4	1	5	13	16	9	4th				Amedeo Varese	24
1919–20	Cat 1	did not qualify to final round											Amedeo Varese	24
1920–21	Reg	6	5	1	0	21	5	11	1st				Armando Bellolio	12
1920–21	Reg	10	3	2	5	14	11	8	4th				Armando Bellolio	12
1920–21	Cat 1	6	0	1	5	8	18	1	4th				Armando Bellolio	12
1920–21	Cat 1	did not qualify to final round											Armando Bellolio	12
1921–22	Div 1	22	7	4	11	29	36	18	9th	DNE			Venerino Papa	10
1922–23	Div 1	22	8	10	4	32	28	26	4th				Giuseppe Santagostino	11
1923–24	Div 1	22	7	5	10	38	44	19	9th				Giuseppe Santagostino	16
1924–25	Div 1	24	10	1	13	45	51	21	9th				Rodolfo Ostromann	18
1925–26	Div 1	22	10	2	10	43	39	22	7th				Karl Muller	12
1926–27	Div N	18	11	2	5	41	27	24	2nd	R32^{[G]}			Alessandro Savelli	11
1926–27	Div N	10	2	2	6	13	25	6	6th	R32^{[G]}			Alessandro Savelli	11
1927–28	Div N	20	10	6	4	35	23	26	4th				Pietro Pastore	13
1927–28	Div N	14	5	4	5	21	24	14	6th				Pietro Pastore	13
1928–29	Div N	30	18	6	6	77	34	42	2nd				Pietro Pastore	26
1929–30	Serie A	34	11	10	13	52	48	32	11th				Giuseppe Santagostino	11
1930–31	Serie A	34	12	7	15	48	53	31	12th				Giuseppe Santagostino	11
1931–32	Serie A	34	15	9	10	57	40	39	4th				Pietro Pastore	13
1932–33	Serie A	34	11	10	13	57	62	32	11th				Mario Romani	19
1933–34	Serie A	34	12	9	13	50	49	33	9th				Pietro Arcari	15
1934–35	Serie A	30	8	11	11	36	38	27	10th				Pietro Arcari	11
1935–36	Serie A	30	10	8	12	40	41	28	8th	SF			Pietro Arcari	11
1936–37	Serie A	30	13	10	7	39	29	36	4th	SF			Egidio Capra	12
1937–38	Serie A	30	13	12	5	43	27	38	3rd	SF	Mitropa Cup	R16	Aldo Boffi	16
1938–39	Serie A	30	10	8	12	43	36	28	9th	SF			Aldo Boffi	19
1939–40	Serie A	30	10	8	12	46	38	28	8th	R16			Aldo Boffi	24
1940–41	Serie A	30	12	10	8	55	34	34	3rd	R16			Aldo Boffi	16
1941–42	Serie A	30	10	7	13	53	53	27	10th	RU			Aldo Boffi	22
1942–43	Serie A	30	10	9	11	39	44	29	6th	QF			Walter Del Medico	9
1943–44	not held due to the Second World War										Campionato; Alta Italia	Reg		
1944–45	not held due to the Second World War										Torneo Benefico Lombardo	6th		
1945–46	Reg	26	12	6	8	38	36	30	4th^{[L]}				Aredio Gimona	16
1945–46	Div N	14	7	2	5	25	16	16	3rd				Aredio Gimona	16
1946–47	Serie A	38	19	12	7	75	52	50	4th				Héctor Puricelli	21
1947–48	Serie A	40	21	7	12	76	48	49	2nd				Héctor Puricelli	17
1948–49	Serie A	38	21	8	9	83	52	50	3rd				Riccardo Carapellese	17
1949–50	Serie A	38	27	3	8	118	45	57	2nd				Gunnar Nordahl	35
1950–51	Serie A	38	26	8	4	107	39	60	**1st**		Latin Cup	**W**	Gunnar Nordahl	34
1951–52	Serie A	38	20	13	5	87	41	53	2nd				Gunnar Nordahl	26
1952–53	Serie A	34	17	9	8	64	34	43	3rd		Latin Cup	RU	Gunnar Nordahl	26
1953–54	Serie A	34	17	10	7	66	39	44	3rd				Gunnar Nordahl	23
1954–55	Serie A	34	19	10	5	81	35	48	**1st**		Latin Cup	3rd	Gunnar Nordahl	27
1955–56	Serie A	34	16	9	9	70	48	41	2nd		European Cup	SF	Gunnar Nordahl	23
1955–56	Serie A	34	16	9	9	70	48	41	2nd		Latin Cup	**W**	Gunnar Nordahl	23
1956–57	Serie A	34	21	6	7	65	40	48	**1st**		Latin Cup	3rd	Gastone Bean	17
1957–58	Serie A	34	9	14	11	61	47	32	9th	QF^{[O]}	European Cup	RU	Carlo Galli	12
1958–59	Serie A	34	20	12	2	84	32	52	**1st**	R16	Friendship Cup ^{[P]}	n/a	José Altafini	28
1959–60	Serie A	34	17	10	7	56	37	44	3rd	R2	European Cup	R16	José Altafini	20
1959–60	Serie A	34	17	10	7	56	37	44	3rd	R2	Friendship Cup ^{[P]}	n/a	José Altafini	20
1960–61	Serie A	34	18	9	7	65	39	45	2nd	R16	Friendship Cup ^{[P]}	n/a	José Altafini	22
1961–62	Serie A	34	24	5	5	83	36	53	**1st**	R32	Fairs Cup	R1	José Altafini	22
1961–62	Serie A	34	24	5	5	83	36	53	**1st**	R32	Friendship Cup	SF	José Altafini	22
1962–63	Serie A	34	15	13	6	53	27	43	3rd	R16	European Cup	**W**	José Altafini	11
1962–63	Serie A	34	15	13	6	53	27	43	3rd	R16	Friendship Cup	RU	José Altafini	11
1963–64	Serie A	34	21	9	4	58	28	51	3rd	QF	European Cup	QF	Amarildo	14
1963–64	Serie A	34	21	9	4	58	28	51	3rd	QF	Intercontinental Cup	RU	Amarildo	14
1964–65	Serie A	34	21	9	4	52	23	51	2nd	R1	Fairs Cup	R1	Amarildo	14
1965–66	Serie A	34	13	12	9	43	44	38	7th	QF	Fairs Cup	R16	Angelo Sormani	21
1966–67	Serie A	34	11	15	8	36	32	37	8th	**W**	Mitropa Cup	R16	Gianni Rivera	12
1966–67	Serie A	34	11	15	8	36	32	37	8th	**W**	Coppa delle Alpi	6th	Gianni Rivera	12
1967–68	Serie A	30	18	10	2	53	24	46	**1st**	RU	Cup Winners' Cup	**W**	Pierino Prati	15
1968–69	Serie A	30	14	13	3	31	12	41	3rd	QF	European Cup	**W**	Pierino Prati	14
1969–70	Serie A	30	13	10	7	38	24	36	4th	Grp	European Cup	R16	Pierino Prati	12
1969–70	Serie A	30	13	10	7	38	24	36	4th	Grp	Intercontinental Cup	**W**	Pierino Prati	12
1970–71	Serie A	30	15	12	3	54	26	42	2nd	RU			Pierino Prati	19
1971–72	Serie A	30	16	10	4	36	17	42	2nd	**W**	UEFA Cup	SF	Albertino Bigon	14
1972–73	Serie A	30	18	8	4	65	33	44	2nd	**W**	Cup Winners' Cup	**W**	Gianni Rivera	17
1973–74	Serie A	30	11	8	11	34	36	30	7th	Grp	Cup Winners' Cup	RU	Luciano Chiarugi	11
1973–74	Serie A	30	11	8	11	34	36	30	7th	Grp	European Super Cup	RU	Luciano Chiarugi	11
1974–75	Serie A	30	12	12	6	37	22	36	5th	RU			Egidio Calloni	11
1975–76	Serie A	30	15	8	7	42	28	38	3rd	Grp	UEFA Cup	QF	Egidio Calloni	13
1976–77	Serie A	30	5	17	8	37	30	27	10th	**W**	UEFA Cup	R16	Egidio Calloni	5
1977–78	Serie A	30	12	13	5	38	25	37	4th	Grp	Cup Winners' Cup	R1	Aldo Maldera	8
1978–79	Serie A	30	17	10	3	46	19	44	**1st**	Grp	UEFA Cup	R16	Albertino Bigon	12
1979–80	Serie A	30	14	8	8	34	19	36	3rd^{[U]}	QF	European Cup	R1	Stefano Chiodi	7
1980–81	**Serie B**	38	18	14	6	49	29	50	**1st**	Grp			Roberto Antonelli	15
1981–82	**Serie A**	30	7	10	13	21	31	24	14th	Grp	Mitropa Cup	**W**	Roberto Antonelli	4
1982–83	**Serie B**	38	19	16	3	77	36	54	**1st**	QF			Sergio Battistini	11
1983–84	**Serie A**	30	10	12	8	37	40	32	6th	QF			Oscar Damiani	7
1984–85	Serie A	30	12	12	6	31	25	36	5th	RU			Pietro Paolo Virdis	9
1985–86	Serie A	30	10	11	9	26	24	31	7th	R16	UEFA Cup	R16	Mark Hateley	8
1985–86	Serie A	30	10	11	9	26	24	31	7th	R16	Torneo Estivo	Grp	Mark Hateley	8
1986–87	Serie A	30	13	9	8	31	21	31	5th^{[V]}	R16			Pietro Paolo Virdis	17
1987–88	Serie A	30	17	11	2	43	14	45	**1st**	R16	UEFA Cup	R2	Pietro Paolo Virdis	11
1988–89	Serie A	34	16	14	4	61	25	46	3rd	Grp	European Cup	**W**	Marco van Basten	19
1988–89	Serie A	34	16	14	4	61	25	46	3rd	Grp	Supercoppa Italiana	**W**	Marco van Basten	19
1989–90	Serie A	34	22	5	7	56	27	49	2nd	RU	European Cup	**W**	Marco van Basten	19
1989–90	Serie A	34	22	5	7	56	27	49	2nd	RU	European Super Cup	**W**	Marco van Basten	19
1989–90	Serie A	34	22	5	7	56	27	49	2nd	RU	Intercontinental Cup	**W**	Marco van Basten	19
1990–91	Serie A	34	18	10	6	46	19	46	2nd	SF	European Cup	QF	Marco van Basten	11
1990–91	Serie A	34	18	10	6	46	19	46	2nd	SF	European Super Cup	**W**	Marco van Basten	11
1990–91	Serie A	34	18	10	6	46	19	46	2nd	SF	Intercontinental Cup	**W**	Marco van Basten	11
1991–92	Serie A	34	22	12	0	74	21	56	**1st**	SF	banned ^{[W]}		Marco van Basten	25
1992–93	Serie A	34	18	14	2	65	32	50	**1st**	SF	Champions League	RU	Jean-Pierre Papin Marco van Basten	13
1992–93	Serie A	34	18	14	2	65	32	50	**1st**	SF	Supercoppa Italiana	**W**	Jean-Pierre Papin Marco van Basten	13
1993–94	Serie A	34	19	12	3	36	15	50	**1st**	R16	Champions League	**W**	Daniele Massaro	11
1993–94	Serie A	34	19	12	3	36	15	50	**1st**	R16	European Super Cup	RU	Daniele Massaro	11
1993–94	Serie A	34	19	12	3	36	15	50	**1st**	R16	Intercontinental Cup	RU	Daniele Massaro	11
1993–94	Serie A	34	19	12	3	36	15	50	**1st**	R16	Supercoppa Italiana	**W**	Daniele Massaro	11
1994–95	Serie A	34	17	9	8	53	32	60	4th	R16	Champions League	RU	Marco Simone	17
1994–95	Serie A	34	17	9	8	53	32	60	4th	R16	European Super Cup	**W**	Marco Simone	17
1994–95	Serie A	34	17	9	8	53	32	60	4th	R16	Intercontinental Cup	RU	Marco Simone	17
1994–95	Serie A	34	17	9	8	53	32	60	4th	R16	Supercoppa Italiana	**W**	Marco Simone	17
1995–96	Serie A	34	21	10	3	60	24	73	**1st**	QF	UEFA Cup	QF	George Weah	11
1996–97	Serie A	34	11	10	13	43	45	43	11th	QF	Champions League	Grp	George Weah	13
1996–97	Serie A	34	11	10	13	43	45	43	11th	QF	Supercoppa Italiana	RU	George Weah	13
1997–98	Serie A	34	11	11	12	37	43	44	10th	RU			George Weah	10
1998–99	Serie A	34	20	10	4	59	34	70	**1st**	R16			Oliver Bierhoff	19
1999–2000	Serie A	34	16	13	5	65	40	61	3rd	QF	Champions League	Grp	Andriy Shevchenko	24
1999–2000	Serie A	34	16	13	5	65	40	61	3rd	QF	Supercoppa Italiana	RU	Andriy Shevchenko	24
2000–01	Serie A	34	12	13	9	56	46	49	6th	SF	Champions League	Grp	Andriy Shevchenko	24
2001–02	Serie A	34	14	13	7	47	33	55	4th	SF	UEFA Cup	SF	Andriy Shevchenko	14
2002–03	Serie A	34	18	7	9	55	30	61	3rd	**W**	Champions League	**W**	Filippo Inzaghi	17
2003–04	Serie A	34	25	7	2	65	24	82	**1st**	SF	Champions League	QF	Andriy Shevchenko	24
2003–04	Serie A	34	25	7	2	65	24	82	**1st**	SF	UEFA Super Cup	**W**	Andriy Shevchenko	24
2003–04	Serie A	34	25	7	2	65	24	82	**1st**	SF	Intercontinental Cup	RU	Andriy Shevchenko	24
2003–04	Serie A	34	25	7	2	65	24	82	**1st**	SF	Supercoppa Italiana	RU	Andriy Shevchenko	24
2004–05	Serie A	38	23	10	5	63	28	79	2nd	QF	Champions League	RU	Andriy Shevchenko	17
2004–05	Serie A	38	23	10	5	63	28	79	2nd	QF	Supercoppa Italiana	**W**	Andriy Shevchenko	17
2005–06	Serie A	38	28	4	6	85	31	58^{[Y]}	3rd	QF	Champions League	SF	Andriy Shevchenko	19
2006–07	Serie A	38	19	12	7	57	36	61^{[Y]}	4th	SF	Champions League	**W**	Alberto Gilardino	12
2007–08	Serie A	38	18	10	10	66	38	64	5th	R16	Champions League	R16	Kaká	15
2007–08	Serie A	38	18	10	10	66	38	64	5th	R16	UEFA Super Cup	**W**	Kaká	15
2007–08	Serie A	38	18	10	10	66	38	64	5th	R16	Club World Cup	**W**	Kaká	15
2008–09	Serie A	38	22	8	8	70	35	74	3rd	R16	UEFA Cup	R32	Kaká	16
2009–10	Serie A	38	20	10	8	60	39	70	3rd	QF	Champions League	R16	Marco Borriello	14
2010–11	Serie A	38	24	10	4	65	24	82	**1st**	SF	Champions League	R16	Zlatan Ibrahimović Alexandre Pato Robinho	14
2011–12	Serie A	38	24	8	6	74	33	80	2nd	SF	Champions League	QF	Zlatan Ibrahimović	28
2011–12	Serie A	38	24	8	6	74	33	80	2nd	SF	Supercoppa Italiana	**W**	Zlatan Ibrahimović	28
2012–13	Serie A	38	21	9	8	67	39	72	3rd	QF	Champions League	R16	Stephan El Shaarawy	16
2013–14	Serie A	38	16	9	13	57	49	57	8th	QF	Champions League	R16	Mario Balotelli	14
2014–15	Serie A	38	13	13	12	56	50	52	10th	QF			Jérémy Ménez	16
2015–16	Serie A	38	15	12	11	49	43	57	7th	RU			Carlos Bacca	18
2016–17	Serie A	38	18	9	11	57	45	63	6th	QF	Supercoppa Italiana	**W**	Carlos Bacca	13
2017–18	Serie A	38	18	10	10	56	42	64	6th	RU	Europa League	R16	Patrick Cutrone	10
2018–19	Serie A	38	19	11	8	55	36	68	5th	SF	Europa League	Grp	Krzysztof Piątek	9
2018–19	Serie A	38	19	11	8	55	36	68	5th	SF	Supercoppa Italiana	RU	Krzysztof Piątek	9
2019–20	Serie A	38	19	9	10	63	46	66	6th	SF			Ante Rebić	11
2020–21	Serie A	38	24	7	7	74	41	79	2nd	QF	Europa League	R16	Zlatan Ibrahimović	15
2021–22	Serie A	38	26	8	4	69	31	86	**1st**	SF	Champions League	Grp	Olivier Giroud Rafael Leão	11
2022–23	Serie A	38	20	10	8	64	43	70	4th	R16	Champions League	SF	Rafael Leão	15
2022–23	Serie A	38	20	10	8	64	43	70	4th	R16	Supercoppa Italiana	RU	Rafael Leão	15
2023–24	Serie A	38	22	9	7	76	49	75	2nd	QF	Champions League	Grp	Olivier Giroud	15
2023–24	Serie A	38	22	9	7	76	49	75	2nd	QF	Europa League	QF	Olivier Giroud	15
2024–25	Serie A	38	18	9	11	61	43	63	8th	RU	Champions League	KPO	Christian Pulisic	11
2024–25	Serie A	38	18	9	11	61	43	63	8th	RU	Supercoppa Italiana	**W**	Christian Pulisic	11
2025–26	Serie A	38	20	10	8	53	35	70	5th	R16	Supercoppa Italiana	SF	Rafael Leão	9

== Achievements ==
- Doubles:
  - Serie A and UEFA Cup Winners' Cup: 1
    - 1967–68 season
  - Coppa Italia and Cup Winners' Cup: 1
    - 1972–73 season
  - Serie A and UEFA Champions League: 1
    - 1993–94 season
  - Coppa Italia and UEFA Champions League: 1
    - 2002–03 season

== Notes ==
A. Before the establishment of the modern Serie A in 1929, the championship was contested under several different formats, including knock-out competitions or successive group stages.

B. The Coppa Italia was founded in 1922, but – despite an abortive attempt in 1927 – a second edition did not take place before the 1935–36 season. Since then the tournament was played on a regular basis until 1943, when it was suspended due to World War II. The competition was eventually resumed only in 1958.

C. Only league goals are counted. The Serie A Golden Boot known as Capocannoniere (plural: capocannonieri) is the award given to the highest goalscorer in Serie A.

D. After winning a double tie-breaker against Juventus (0–0 aet and 2–0 by forfeit).

E. Milan, along with other major clubs, did not enter the league in 1908 due to a dispute with the Italian FA over the use of foreign players.

F. The championship was suspended when the First World War broke out, with the last round still to play. Despite this, in 1919, the Italian FA decided to officialize the results and awarded the title to Genoa.

G. The tournament was abandoned, due to lack of available dates. Milan were scheduled to play against Juventus in the fourth round.

H. After winning a double tie-breaker against Brescia (1–1 aet and 2–1 aet) to qualify for the final round.

I. The 1958 Coppa Italia started in the 1957–58 season, but was not completed before September, thus being officially awarded during the 1958–59 season.

J. ^{a} ^{b} ^{c} In the first three editions of the Friendship Cup, the final standing was by nations, rather than by clubs.

K. Milan were relegated due to involvement in a match-fixing scandal.

L. After winning a tie-breaker against Sampdoria (1–0 aet) to get a UEFA Cup spot.

M. Milan received a one-year ban from UEFA competitions due to unsporting behaviour.

N. ^{a} ^{b} Milan were inflicted a 30 points deduction at the end of the 2005–06 season and an 8 points deduction at the start of the 2006–07 season, due to alleged involvement in the 2006 match-fixing scandal.
