= 1914–15 Milan FBCC season =

Italian football club season

Milan Foot-Ball and Cricket Club
1914–15 season
- President: Piero Pirelli
- Manager: Cesare Stabilini, Mario Beltrami, Piero Peverelli
- Stadium: Arena Civica; Velodromo Sempione
- Italian Football Championship: 4th
- Top goalscorer: League: Louis Van Hege (22); All: Louis Van Hege (22)
Home colours	Away colours

During the 1914–15 season Milan Foot-Ball and Cricket Club competed in the Italian Football Championship.

== Summary ==
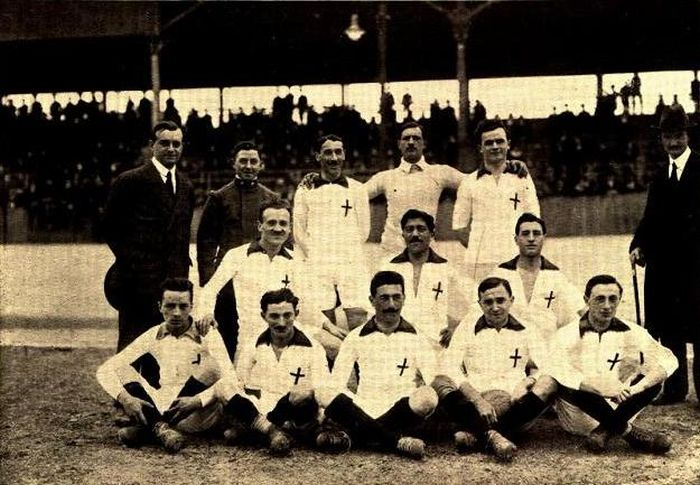
A Milan formation from the 1914-15 season.

Before the start of the season, Milan moved their home pitch from the Campo Milan di Porta Monforte to the Velodromo Sempione. The season started well for Milan, as they won both the preliminary round and the semifinal tournament, reaching the final round of northern Italy.

The final round, however, did not end due to Italy's entry into the First World War. The title of Italian champion was then awarded to Genoa with a post-war resolution by the FIGC. In this championship, Milan lost only 3 games out of 21 played. Striker Louis Van Hege was still the star, scoring 22 goals in 20 games.

== Squad ==
Note: Flags indicate national team as defined under FIFA eligibility rules; some limited exceptions apply. Players may hold more than one non-FIFA nationality.

Pos.	Nation	Player
GK	ITA	Luigi Barbieri
GK	ITA	Lorenzo Gaslini
DF	ITA	Luigi Pettinelli
DF	ITA	Marco Sala
DF	ITA	Amilcare Pizzi
DF	ITA	Egidio Rovelli
MF	ARG	Cesare Lovati
MF	ITA	Amleto Balloni
MF	ITA	Augusto Gaetano Avanzini
MF	ITA	Attilio Colombo
MF	ITA	Ernesto Morandi
MF	ITA	Emilio Cazzaniga
MF	ITA	Anselmo Greppi

Pos.	Nation	Player
MF	ITA	Francesco Soldera
MF	ITA	Alessandro Scarioni
MF	ITA	Attilio Trerè
FW	ITA	Carlo Bozzi
FW	ITA	Romolo Ferrario
FW	ITA	Egidio Bertazzoni
FW	ITA	Erminio Brevedan
FW	BEL	Louis Van Hege (Captain)
FW	ITA	Luigi Crema
FW	ITA	Lorenzo Oleario De Bellagente
FW	ITA	Gustavo Zacchi
FW	ITA	Gino Mosca

=== Transfers ===
In
Pos.	Name	from	Type
DF	Amilcare Pizzi	US Milanese	–
DF	Francesco Soldera	US Milanese	–
FW	Erminio Brevedan	Volontari Venezia	–

Out
Pos.	Name	To	Type
DF	Carlo De Vecchi	Cremonese	–
MF	Carlo Capelli	Modena	–

== Competitions ==
=== Italian Football Championship ===
==== Group D ====
4 October 1914 1	Milan	13–0	Audax Modena	Milano
	Soldera I 6'; Trerè II 8', 13', 56', 62'; Van Hege 24', 36', 53', 60', 68'; Brevedan 38', 41', 61'			Stadium: Arena Civica; Referee: G.Colombo

11 October 1914 2	Milan	5–0	A.M.C. Milanese	Milano
	Trerè II 25'; Soldera I 30'; Van Hege 50', 55', 70'			Stadium: Arena Civica; Referee: Terzolo

18 October 1914 3	Chiasso	1–7	Milan	Maslianico
	Carò (?)		7' (?) (?) (?) Van Hege (?) Trerè II (?) Ferrario (?) Morandi	Stadium: Campo Mornello; Referee: G.Colombo

25 October 1914 4	Milan	9–1	Bologna	Milano
	Bozzi 15'; Van Hege 20', 25', 73'; Morandi 33'; Trerè II 44', 62'; Ferrario (?); Lovati (?)		(?) Badini I	Stadium: Arena Civica; Referee: G.Colombo

1 November 1914 5	Juventus Italia	0–6	Milan	Milano
			2', 72' Trerè II; 12', 19', 40', 80' Van Hege	Stadium: Campo di Via Ravizza; Referee: Comazzi

8 November 1914 6	Audax Modena	0–2	Milan	Modena

15 November 1914 7	A.M.C. Milanese	0–3	Milan	Milano
			43' Ferrario; 70', 88' Crema	Stadium: Campo di Via Bersaglio; Referee: Minoli

22 November 1914 8	Milan	5–0	Chiasso	Milano
	Van Hege 4'; Ferrario 11', 50'; Scarioni II 65'; Trerè II 75'			Stadium: Velodromo Sempione; Referee: Laugeri

29 November 1914 9	Bologna	0–1	Milan	Bologna
			12' Ferrario	Stadium: Stadio Sterlino; Referee: Bertazzoni

6 December 1914 10	Milan	1–1	Juventus Italia	Milano
	Morandi 65'		66' Cozzi	Stadium: Velodromo Sempione; Referee: Portigliatti

==== Semifinals round ====
10 January 1915 1	Novara	1–2	Milan	Novara
	Maggi 15'		1' Morandi; 30' Van Hege	Stadium: Campo di Via Lombroso; Referee: Scamoni

17 January 1915 2	Milan	2–1	Alessandria	Milano
	Pizzi 22' (pen.); Morandi 63'		89' Poggi	Stadium: Velodromo Sempione; Referee: Laugeri

14 March 1915 3	Milan	2–0	Vigor Torino	Milano
	Pizzi 2'; Ferrario 70'			Stadium: Velodromo Sempione; Referee: Brunetti

21 March 4	Milan	2–1	Novara	Milano
	Ferrario 39'; Sala 85'		44' Reynaudi	Stadium: Velodromo Sempione; Referee: Laugeri

28 March 1915 5	Alessandria	0–0	Milan	Alessandria
				Stadium: Campo di Piazza d'Armi Vecchia; Referee: Portigliatti

7 March 1915 6	Vigor Torino	3–1	Milan	Torino
	De Ambrosis 40', 48', 75'		79' Ferrario	Stadium: Stadium di Torino; Referee: Terzolo

==== Northern Italy final round ====
18 April 1915 1	Milan	1–1	Genoa	Milano
	Ferrario 2' (pen.)		13' Santamaria	Stadium: Velodromo Sempione; Referee: Portigliatti

25 April 1915 2	Milan	1–1	Torino	Milano
	Greppi 2'		7' Mosso I	Stadium: Velodromo Sempione; Referee: Resegotti

2 May 1915 3	Inter	3–1	Milan	Milano
	Agradi 1'; Aebi (?) (?)		89' (pen.) Ferrario	Stadium: Campo di Via Goldoni; Referee: Scamoni

9 May 1915 4	Genoa	3–0	Milan	Genova
	Walsingham 5'; Berardo 33'; De Vecchi 61' (pen.)			Stadium: Campo Genoa Cricket & Football Club; Referee: Pedroni

16 May 1915 5	Torino	1–1	Milan	Torino
	Mosso I 35' (pen.)		39' Van Hege	Stadium: Campo di Via Sebastopoli; Referee: Scamoni

23 May 1915 6	Milan	Inter

== Statistics ==
=== Squad statistics ===
Competition	Points	Home						Away						Total						GD
Competition	Points	G	W	D	L	Gs	Ga	G	W	D	L	Gs	Ga	G	W	D	L	Gs	Ga	GD
1914–15 Prima Categoria	31	10	7	3	0	41	6	11	6	2	3	24	12	21	13	5	3	65	18	+47

=== Players statistics ===
No.	Pos	Nat	Player	Total		Italian Football Championship	
No.	Pos	Nat	Player	Apps	Goals	Apps	Goals
	GK	(Italy) ITA	Luigi Barbieri	18	-18	18	-18
	GK	(Italy) ITA	Lorenzo Gaslini	2	0	2	0
	DF	(Italy) ITA	Marco Sala	15	1	15	1
	DF	(Italy) ITA	Amilcare Pizzi	16	2	16	2
	DF	(Italy) ITA	Egidio Rovelli	2	0	2	0
	DF	(Italy) ITA	Luigi Pettinelli	3	0	3	0
	MF	(Italy) ITA	Alessandro Scarioni	17	1	17	1
	MF	(Italy) ITA	Augusto Gaetano Avanzini	1	0	1	0
	MF	(Italy) ITA	Attilio Trerè	12	11	12	11
	MF	(Italy) ITA	Anselmo Greppi	5	1	5	1
	MF	(Argentina) ARG	Cesare Lovati	15	1	15	1
	MF	(Italy) ITA	Amleto Balloni	1	0	1	0
	MF	(Italy) ITA	Attilio Colombo	3	0	3	0
	MF	(Italy) ITA	Francesco Soldera	18	2	18	2
	MF	(Italy) ITA	Ernesto Morandi	13	5	13	5
	MF	(Italy) ITA	Emilio Cazzaniga	1	0	1	0
	FW	(Italy) ITA	Romolo Ferrario	17	11	17	11
	FW	(Italy) ITA	Luigi Crema	2	2	2	2
	FW	(Italy) ITA	Lorenzo Oleario De Bellagente	1	0	1	0
	FW	(Belgium) BEL	Louis Van Hege	20	22	20	22
	FW	(Italy) ITA	Carlo Bozzi	16	1	16	1
	FW	(Italy) ITA	Egidio Bertazzoni	2	0	2	0
	FW	(Italy) ITA	Erminio Brevedan	4	3	4	3
	FW	(Italy) ITA	Gino Mosca	1	0	1	0
	FW	(Italy) ITA	Gustavo Zacchi	1	0	1	0

== See also ==
- AC Milan

== Bibliography ==
- Almanacco illustrato del Milan, ed: 2, March 2005. Panini.
- Enrico Tosi. La storia del Milan, May 2005. Italia/Italy cid Tosi.
- Milan. Sempre con te, December 2009. Mondadori. 2009. ISBN 978-88-04-59118-4.
