= 1915–16 Milan FBCC season =

Italian football club season

Milan Foot-Ball and Cricket Club
1915–16 season
- President: Piero Pirelli
- Manager: Guido Moda
- Stadium: Velodromo Sempione
- Coppa Federale: Winner
- Top goalscorer: League: Aldo Cevenini (10); All: Aldo Cevenini (10)
Home colours	Away colours

During the 1915–16 season Milan Foot-Ball and Cricket Club competed in the Coppa Federale.

== Summary ==
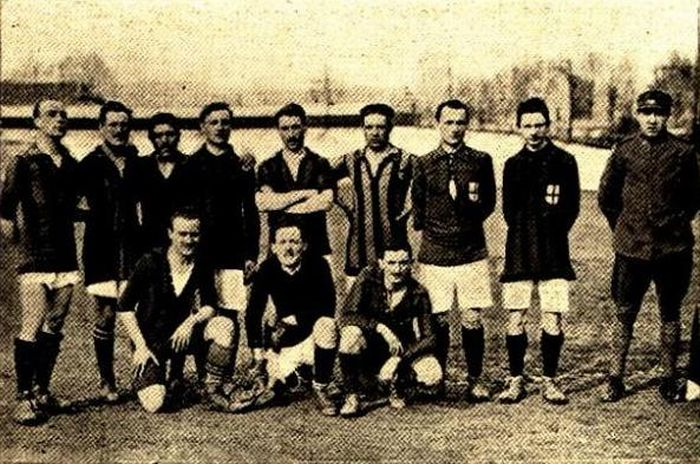
A Milan formation from the 1915-16 season.

This season the championship was suspended by the federation due to participation of Italy to the First World War. The FIGC organized an alternative competition, the Coppa Federale (Federal Cup), in which the most important teams from Northern Italy participated, including Milan. However, these teams did not have a full roster, as many players had left for the front. For Milan, among the most important absences worth mentioning are those of Louis Van Hege, the club's top scorer for the previous five seasons, Rossoneri veteran Alessandro Scarioni and Cesare Lovati.

On the other hand, Aldo Cevenini returned to Milan, scoring 10 goals in 9 matches, and helping the club to win the Federal Cup ahead of Juventus, Modena and Genoa. This was the first important trophy won by Milan after the three league titles achieved at the beginning of the century, even if the tournament won by the Rossoneri is not counted as official by the Italian federation.

In 1915 Milan changed headquarters for the third time, moving from the Bottiglieria Franzini to the Birreria Spatenbräu, now called Birreria Colombo, thus returning to its previous headquarters.

== Squad ==
Note: Flags indicate national team as defined under FIFA eligibility rules; some limited exceptions apply. Players may hold more than one non-FIFA nationality.

Pos.	Nation	Player
GK	ITA	Luigi Barbieri
GK	ITA	Armando Gambuti
DF	ITA	Arrigo Gandolfi
DF	ITA	Marco Sala (Captain)
DF	ITA	Amilcare Pizzi
MF	ITA	Amedeo Guarnieri
MF	ITA	Augusto Gaetano Avanzini
MF	ITA	Enio Moroni
MF	ITA	Ernesto Morandi
MF	ITA	Emilio Cazzaniga
MF	ITA	Anselmo Greppi

Pos.	Nation	Player
MF	ITA	Francesco Soldera
MF	ITA	Oreste Perfetti
MF	ITA	Dante Raineri
FW	ITA	Carlo Bozzi
FW	ITA	Romolo Ferrario
FW	ITA	Aldo Cevenini
FW	ITA	Luigi Cevenini
FW	BEL	Louis Van Hege
FW	ITA	Mario Crespi
FW	ITA	Giovanni Mazzoni
FW	ITA	Gustavo Zacchi

=== Transfers ===
In
Pos.	Name	from	Type
FW	Aldo Cevenini	Inter	–
MF	Luigi Cevenini	Inter	–
MF	Mario Crespi	Legnano	–
GK	Armando Gambuti	Nazionale Lombardia	–
FW	Amedeo Guarnieri	Insubria Goliardo	–
MF	Oreste Perfetti	Enotria Milano	–

Out
Pos.	Name	To	Type
FW	Gino Mosca	Ardita Juventus	–

== Competitions ==
=== Coppa Federale ===
==== Lombardy group ====
19 December 1915 1	Inter	0–3	Milan	Milano
			16', 35' Cevenini I 89' Avanzini	Stadium: Via Goldoni; Referee: Moretti

26 December 1915 2	Milan	2–0	US_Milanese	Milano
	Ferrario 42'; Cevenini I 43'			Stadium: Velodromo Sempione; Referee: Mauro

9 January 1916 3	Milan	2–1	Inter	Milano
	Cevenini I 81', 85'		77' Fabbri	Stadium: Velodromo Sempione; Referee: Varisco

16 January 1916 4	US_Milanese	2–3	Milan	Milano
	Cozzi 75'; D'Agardi 87'		27', 65' (pen.) Ferrario; 69' Cevenini I	Stadium: Campo di via Stelvio; Referee: Carugati

==== National phase ====
13 February 1916 1	Modena	0–0	Milan	Modena
				Referee: Crivelli

27 February 1916 2	Milan	3–2	Juventus	Milano
	Cevenini I (?); Avanzini (?) 72'		29' Berganti; 55' Bona	Stadium: Velodromo Sempione; Referee: Terzolo

5 March 1916 3	Milan	2–0	Casale	Milano
				Stadium: Velodromo Sempione

5 March 1916 4	Milan	2–0	Modena	Milano
	Cevenini I 20'; Avanzini 50'			Stadium: Velodromo Sempione; Referee: Massa

12 March 1916 5	Juventus	2–0	Milan	Torino
	Berganti 5'; Pirovano 25' (pen.)			Referee: Massa

2 April 1916 6	Genoa	1–0	Milan	Genova
	Walsingham 55'			Stadium: Campo Marassi; Referee: Borda

9 April 1916 7	Casale	0–2	Milan	Casale Monferrato

30 April 1916 8	Milan	3–1	Genoa	Milano
	Morandi 1'; Cevenini I (?) 90' (pen.)		(?) De Vecchi	Stadium: Velodromo Sempione; Referee: Rangone

== Statistics ==
=== Squad statistics ===
Competition	Points	Home						Away						Total						GD
Competition	Points	G	W	D	L	Gs	Ga	G	W	D	L	Gs	Ga	G	W	D	L	Gs	Ga	GD
Coppa Federale 1915–16	19	6	6	0	0	14	4	6	3	1	2	8	5	12	9	1	2	22	9	+13

=== Players statistics ===
No.	Pos	Nat	Player	Total		Italian Football Championship	
No.	Pos	Nat	Player	Apps	Goals	Apps	Goals
	GK	(Italy) ITA	Luigi Barbieri	3	-2	3	-2
	GK	(Italy) ITA	Armando Gambuti	7	-7	7	-7
	DF	(Italy) ITA	Marco Sala	10	0	10	0
	DF	(Italy) ITA	Amilcare Pizzi	10	0	10	0
	DF	(Italy) ITA	Arrigo Gandolfi	1	0	1	0
	MF	(Italy) ITA	Augusto Gaetano Avanzini	9	4	9	4
	MF	(Italy) ITA	Oreste Perfetti	1	0	1	0
	MF	(Italy) ITA	Anselmo Greppi	5	0	5	0
	MF	(Italy) ITA	Dante Raineri	1	0	1	0
	MF	(Italy) ITA	Amedeo Guarnieri	1	0	1	0
	MF	(Italy) ITA	Enio Moroni	3	0	3	0
	MF	(Italy) ITA	Francesco Soldera	9	0	9	0
	MF	(Italy) ITA	Ernesto Morandi	10	1	10	1
	MF	(Italy) ITA	Emilio Cazzaniga	9	0	9	0
	FW	(Italy) ITA	Romolo Ferrario	8	3	8	3
	FW	(Italy) ITA	Aldo Cevenini	9	10	9	10
	FW	(Italy) ITA	Luigi Cevenini	1	0	1	0
	FW	(Belgium) BEL	Louis Van Hege	2	0	2	0
	FW	(Italy) ITA	Carlo Bozzi	5	0	5	0
	FW	(Italy) ITA	Mario Crespi	1	0	1	0
	FW	(Italy) ITA	Giovanni Mazzoni	3	0	3	0
	FW	(Italy) ITA	Gustavo Zacchi	2	0	2	0

== See also ==
- AC Milan

== Bibliography ==
- Almanacco illustrato del Milan, ed: 2, March 2005. Panini.
- Enrico Tosi. La storia del Milan, May 2005. Italia/Italy cid Tosi.
- Milan. Sempre con te, December 2009. Mondadori. 2009. ISBN 978-88-04-59118-4.
