= 1913–14 Milan FBCC season =

Italian football club season

Milan Foot-Ball and Cricket Club
1913–14 season
- President: Piero Pirelli
- Manager: Cesare Stabilini, Mario Beltrami, Piero Peverelli
- Stadium: Campo Milan di Porta Monforte; Arena Civica; Velodromo Sempione
- Italian Football Championship: 3rd
- Top goalscorer: League: Louis Van Hege (21); All: Louis Van Hege (21)
Home colours	Away colours

During the 1913–14 season Milan Foot-Ball and Cricket Club competed in the Italian Football Championship.

== Summary ==
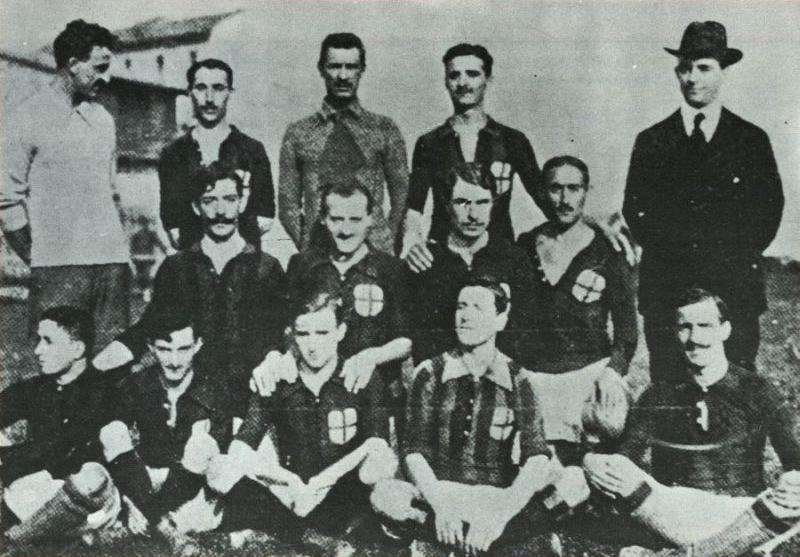
A Milan formation from the 1913-14 season.

This season, the Italian Championship, due to the increase in the number of participating clubs, was organized into six groups, three in which teams from northern Italy participated, and three in which teams from the center-south of the Peninsula took part. Milan did not pass the Lombardy qualifying group due to their third place behind Inter and Juventus. The Turin team ended the group stage of the previous season in the last place, but instead of being relegated, they obtained the admission to the Lombardy group for the 1913–14 season, implicitly preventing Milan from qualifying to the final round on national level.

Louis Van Hege had a noteworthy season, with 21 goals in 17 games, once again making him the team's top scorer. The pre-season featured the move of Renzo De Vecchi to Genoa, the first sale of a footballer in the Italian championship.

== Squad ==
Note: Flags indicate national team as defined under FIFA eligibility rules; some limited exceptions apply. Players may hold more than one non-FIFA nationality.

Pos.	Nation	Player
GK	ITA	Luigi Barbieri
GK	ITA	Lorenzo Gaslini
DF	ITA	Luigi Andreoli
DF	ITA	Marco Sala
DF	ITA	Carlo De Vecchi
MF	ARG	Cesare Lovati
MF	ITA	Armando Carito
MF	ITA	Augusto Gaetano Avanzini
MF	ITA	Attilio Colombo
MF	ITA	Ernesto Morandi

Pos.	Nation	Player
MF	ENG	Andrew Williams
MF	ITA	Alessandro Scarioni
MF	ITA	Attilio Trerè
FW	ITA	Carlo Bozzi
FW	ITA	Romolo Ferrario
FW	ITA	Pietro Lana
FW	ITA	Carlo Capelli
FW	BEL	Louis Van Hege (Captain)
FW	ITA	Attilio Marchesi
FW	ITA	Gino Mosca

== Competitions ==
=== Italian Football Championship ===
==== Lombardy group ====
12 October 1913 1	Novara	0–4	Milan	Novara
			14', 82' Van Hege (?), 80' Lana	Stadium: Campo di Via Lombroso; Referee: Meazza

19 October 1913 2	Milan	4–0	Como	Milano
	Van Hege 15', 58'; Williams (?); Trerè II 57'			Stadium: Campo Milan – Porta Monforte; Referee: Rietmann

1 November 1913 3	Milan	3–1	Juventus	Milano
	Van Hege 20', 41'; Lovati 70'		50' Dalmazzo	Stadium: Campo Milan – Porta Monforte

9 November 1913 4	A.M.C. Milanese	1–6	Milan	Milano
	Agradi (?)		27', 49', 56', 62', 75' Van Hege; 55' Ferrario	Stadium: Campo di Via Monterosa; Referee: Franziosi

16 November 1913 5	Milan	1–1	Racing Libertas	Milano
	Van Hege 10'		4' Indemuhle	Stadium: Campo Milan – Porta Monforte; Referee: Comazzi

23 November 1913 6	Juventus Italia	0–6	Milan	Milano
			1' Van Hege; 8' Lana (?), (?) Ferrario; Lovati (?); Montanari (?)	Stadium: Campo di Via Ravizza; Referee: Rietmann

30 November 1913 7	Milan	0–1	Inter	Milano
			20' Cevenini I	Stadium: Campo Milan – Porta Monforte; Referee: Scamoni

7 December 1913 8	US_Milanese	1–1	Milan	Milano
	Soldera II 7'		81' Lana	Stadium: Campo di via Stelvio; Referee: Calì II

14 December 1913 9	Nazionale Lombardia	1–5	Milan	Milano
	Boschetti (?)		23', 26' Marchesi; 35' (pen.), (?) Lana; 57' Trerè II	Stadium: Campo di Via Baggina; Referee: Scamoni

8 March 1914 10	Milan	2–0	Novara	Milano
				Stadium: Campo Milan – Porta Monforte

28 December 1913 11	Como	0–4	Milan	Como
			40', 80' (pen.) Lana; 60' Morandi; 62' Van Hege	Stadium: Campo di Viale dei Mille; Referee: Varisco

4 January 1914 12	Milan	2–2	Nazionale Lombardia	Milano
	Marchesi (?); Pirovano (?)		(?) Reali (?) Caimi II	Stadium: Campo Milan – Porta Monforte; Referee: Pedroni II

25 January 1914 13	Juventus	2–1	Milan	Como
	Bona 14' (pen.), 50'		75' Trerè II	Stadium: Campo di Piazza d'Armi; Referee: Comazzi

1 February 1914 14	Milan	6–1	A.M.C. Milanese	Milano
	Van Hege 24' (pen.), 40', 42'; Marchesi 44', (?); Ferrario (?)		(?) Barbieri	Stadium: Campo Milan – Porta Monforte; Referee: A. Bianchi

8 February 1914 15	Racing Libertas	1–7	Milan	Milano
	Rovati 35'		6' (pen.), 83', (?) Van Hege; 67', (?) Trerè II; 76', 76' Marchesi	Stadium: Campo di Via Bersaglio; Referee: Rietmann

15 February 1914 16	Milan	3–1	Juventus Italia	Milano
	Avanzini 16'; Lana 66'; Morandi 78'		(?) Vitali	Stadium: Campo Milan – Porta Monforte; Referee: Bazzi

22 February 1914 17	Inter	5–2	Milan	Milano
	Cevenini III 30' (pen.), 65'; Bavastro I 75'; Cevenini I 82'; Aebi 89'		35' Morandi; 40' (pen.) Van Hege	Stadium: Campo di Via Goldoni; Referee: Scamoni

1 March 1914 18	Milan	1–1	US_Milanese	Milano
	Avanzini 37'		85' Boiocchi I	Stadium: Campo Milan – Porta Monforte; Referee: Colombo

== Statistics ==
=== Squad statistics ===
Competition	Points	Home						Away						Total						GD
Competition	Points	G	W	D	L	Gs	Ga	G	W	D	L	Gs	Ga	G	W	D	L	Gs	Ga	GD
1913–14 Prima Categoria	26	9	5	3	1	22	8	9	6	1	2	36	11	18	11	4	3	58	19	+39

=== Players statistics ===
No.	Pos	Nat	Player	Total		Italian Football Championship	
No.	Pos	Nat	Player	Apps	Goals	Apps	Goals
	GK	(Italy) ITA	Luigi Barbieri	14	-17	14	-17
	GK	(Italy) ITA	Lorenzo Gaslini	2	0	2	0
	DF	(Italy) ITA	Marco Sala	17	0	17	0
	DF	(Italy) ITA	Luigi Andreoli	1	0	1	0
	DF	(Italy) ITA	Carlo De Vecchi	16	0	16	0
	MF	(Italy) ITA	Alessandro Scarioni	15	0	15	0
	MF	(Italy) ITA	Augusto Gaetano Avanzini	2	2	2	2
	MF	(Italy) ITA	Attilio Trerè	17	5	17	5
	MF	(Argentina) ARG	Cesare Lovati	16	2	16	2
	MF	(Italy) ITA	Arnaldo Carito	1	0	1	0
	MF	(Italy) ITA	Attilio Colombo	1	0	1	0
	MF	(Italy) ITA	Ernesto Morandi	17	3	17	3
	MF	(England) ENG	Andrew Williams	9	1	9	1
	FW	(Italy) ITA	Romolo Ferrario	9	4	9	4
	FW	(Italy) ITA	Pietro Lana	16	9	16	9
	FW	(Belgium) BEL	Louis Van Hege	17	21	17	21
	FW	(Italy) ITA	Carlo Bozzi	6	0	6	0
	FW	(Italy) ITA	Carlo Capelli	2	0	2	0
	FW	(Italy) ITA	Attilio Marchesi	8	7	8	7
	FW	(Italy) ITA	Gino Mosca	1	0	1	0

== See also ==
- AC Milan

== Bibliography ==
- Almanacco illustrato del Milan, ed: 2, March 2005. Panini.
- Enrico Tosi. La storia del Milan, May 2005. Italia/Italy cid Tosi.
- Milan. Sempre con te, December 2009. Mondadori. 2009. ISBN 978-88-04-59118-4.
