= 1920–21 Milan FC season =

Italian football club season

Milan Football Club
1920–21 season
- President: Piero Pirelli
- Manager: Guido Moda
- Stadium: Campo di viale Lombardia
- Italian Football Championship: 4th in the semifinals group stage
- Top goalscorer: League: Armando Bellolio (12); All: Armando Bellolio (12)
Home colours	Away colours

During the 1920–21 season Milan Football Club competed in the Italian Football Championship.

== Summary ==
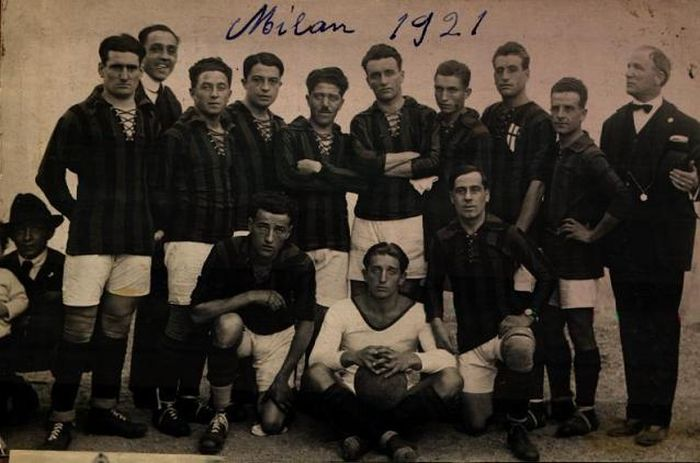
A Milan formation from the 1920-21 season.

This season proved again disappointing for the club. After having made it through the qualifying round without major problems, Milan barely made it through the final regional group, finishing fourth and reaching the national semifinals, where they finished last in their group, failing to qualify for the next stage (five defeats and one draw in six matches).

This was the last season for captain Alessandro Scarioni, who left Milan after 12 seasons and 142 games.

Noteworthy is the expansion of the Viale Lombardia stadium, the Rossoneri's home pitch, which was enlarged with the construction of reinforced concrete stands.

== Squad ==
Note: Flags indicate national team as defined under FIFA eligibility rules; some limited exceptions apply. Players may hold more than one non-FIFA nationality.

Pos.	Nation	Player
GK	ITA	Luigi Binda
GK	ITA	Albino Loffi
GK	ITA	Antonio Travelli
DF	ITA	Renzo Azaghi
DF	ITA	Luigi Andreoli
DF	ITA	Arnaldo Giudici
MF	ITA	Giovanni Maggioni
MF	ITA	Augusto Gaetano Avanzini
MF	ITA	Amedeo Varese
MF	ITA	Pietro Bronzini
MF	ITA	Dionigi Corsi
MF	ITA	Luigi Gandolfi
MF	ITA	Francesco Soldera
MF	ITA	Ernesto Morandi

Pos.	Nation	Player
MF	ITA	Eugenio Morandi
MF	ARG	Cesare Lovati
MF	ITA	Dante Ranieri
MF	ITA	Ferdinando Trabattoni
MF	ITA	Alessandro Scarioni (Captain)
FW	ITA	Romolo Ferrario
FW	ITA	Natale Loiacono
FW	ITA	Armando Bellolio
FW	ITA	Natale Beretta
FW	ITA	Carlo Bozzi
FW	ITA	Giuseppe Gelpi
FW	ITA	Giovanni Mazzoni
FW	ITA	Giuseppe Sangiorgi

=== Transfers ===
In
Pos.	Name	from	Type
FW	Armando Bellolio	Enotria Milano	-
GK	Luigi Binda	Inter	-
FW	Dionigi Corsi	Enotria Milano	-

Out
Pos.	Name	To	Type
FW	Edoardo Mariani	Genoa	-
GK	Enrico Mariani	Neumünster Zurigo	-
MF	Eugenio Negri	Inter	-
GK	Filippo Pellizzoni	Nazionale Lombardia	-
DF	Marco Sala	Inter	-

== Competitions ==
=== Italian Football Championship ===
==== Group B Lombardy ====
24 October 1920 1	Monza	1-4	Milan	Monza
	Mandelli 43'		(?), 38' Varese; 71' (o.g.) Fedeli; 77' Bozzi	Stadium: Campo delle Grazie Vecchie; Referee: Umberto Brambilla

31 October 1920 2	Milan	2-2	Cremonese	Milan
	Bozzi 43', 45'		3' Papadia; 65' Bonzio	Stadium: Campo di Viale Lombardia; Referee: Mario Leida

14 November 1920 3	Milan	5-0	Monza	Milan
	Varese 30', 60'; Bellolio 65', 78'; Mauri 68' (pg)			Stadium: Campo di Viale Lombardia; Referee: Valentino Fries

21 November 1920 1	Cremonese	1-2	Milan	Cremona
	Mainardi 55'		31', 46' Varese	Referee: Achille Gama

28 November 1920 2	Pro Patria	0-1	Milan	Busto Arsizio
			34' Soldera I	Referee: Luigi Barnabò

5 December 1920 3	Milan	7-1	Pro Patria	Milan
	Soldera I 25', 78'; Loiacono 50'; Varese 60'; Bellolio 64', 83', 85'		43' Miotti	Stadium: Campo di Viale Lombardia; Referee: Mario Tradico

==== Final group Lombardy ====
12 December 1920 1	Milan	1-0	Trevigliese	Milan
	Bozzi 33'			Stadium: Campo di Viale Lombardia; Referee: Achille Gama

19 December 1920 2	Inter	0-0	Milan	Milan
				Stadium: Campo di via Goldoni; Referee: Mario Tradico

26 December 1920 3	Milan	2-3	Saronno	Milan
	Bozzi 30'; Morandi 68'		10' Bojocchi I 46', 75' Reina	Stadium: Campo di Viale Lombardia; Referee: Valentino Fries

9 January 1921 4	US Milanese	1-0	Milan	Milan
	Monti 76'			Stadium: Velodromo Sempione; Referee: Achille Gama

16 January 1921 5	Milan	1-2	Legnano	Milan
	Bellolio 14'		48' Rossi; 61' Sodano	Stadium: Campo di Viale Lombardia; Referee: Mario Tradico

23 January 1921 6	Trevigliese	1-2	Milan	Como
	Orsenigo 3'		15' (pen.) Bronzini; 18' Varese	Stadium: Campo di via dei Mille; Referee: Valentino Fries

30 January 1921 7	Milan	1-1	Inter	Milan
	Bellolio 29'		60' (pen.) Cevenini III	Stadium: Campo di Viale Lombardia; Referee: Felice Brunetti

6 February 1921 8	Saronno	1-7	Milan	Bergamo
	Bojocchi I 70'		6', 77' Bellolio; 21', 84', 85' Corsi; 27', 89' Loiacono	Stadium: Ex ippodromo della Clementina, Bergamo; Referee: Luigi Barnabò

13 February 1921 9	Milan	0-1	US Milanese	Milan
			61' Ferrari	Stadium: Campo di Viale Lombardia; Referee: Achille Gama

20 February 1921 10	Legnano	1-0	Milan	Legnano
	Crespi 16'			Stadium: Campo di via Lodi; Referee: Alberto Crivelli

==== National semifinals - Group A ====
10 April 1921 1	Bologna	2-0	Milan	Bologna
	Pozzi 10'; Azaghi 86' (o.g.)			Stadium: Sterlino; Referee: Arturo Bistoletti

17 April 1921 2	Novara	2-0	Milan	Novara
	Meneghetti 50' (pen.); Orioli 57'			Referee: Luigi Saverio Bertazzoni

22 April 1921 3	Milan	2-2	Genoa	Milan
	Bellolio 33'; Morandi 42'		45' De Vecchi; 89' Dellacasa	Stadium: Campo di Viale Lombardia; Referee: Achille Gama

29 May 1921 4	Milan	1-5	Bologna	Milan
	Bronzini (?)		70', 80' (?) Della Valle II (?) Alberti (?) Pozzi	Stadium: Campo di Viale Lombardia; Referee: Giovanni Battista Vagge

5 June 1921 5	Milan	2-3	Novara	Milan
	Bronzini 16' (pen.); Loiacono 63'		19', 58' Migliavacca; 73' Mattuteia	Stadium: Campo di Viale Lombardia; Referee: Giuseppe Venegoni

12 June 1921 6	Genoa	4-3	Milan	Novi Ligure
	Scotti 21'; Dellacasa 25', 40'; Tabacco 76'		23' Corsi; 48', 84' Bellolio	Stadium: Campo Novese; Referee: Augusto Rangone

== Statistics ==
=== Squad statistics ===
Competition	Points	Home						Away						Total						GD
Competition	Points	G	W	D	L	Gs	Ga	G	W	D	L	Gs	Ga	G	W	D	L	Gs	Ga	GD
1920–21 Prima Categoria	20	11	3	3	5	24	20	11	5	1	5	19	14	22	8	4	10	43	34	+9

=== Players statistics ===
No.	Pos	Nat	Player	Total		Italian Football Championship	
No.	Pos	Nat	Player	Apps	Goals	Apps	Goals
	GK	(Italy) ITA	Luigi Binda	19	-22	19	-22
	GK	(Italy) ITA	Albino Loffi	2	-9	2	-9
	GK	(Italy) ITA	Antonio Travelli	1	-3	1	-3
	DF	(Italy) ITA	Luigi Andreoli	1	0	1	0
	DF	(Italy) ITA	Arnaldo Giudici	1	0	1	0
	DF	(Italy) ITA	Renzo Azaghi	19	0	19	0
	DF	(Italy) ITA	Ferdinando Trabattoni	2	0	2	0
	MF	(Argentina) ARG	Cesare Lovati	21	0	21	0
	MF	(Italy) ITA	Pietro Bronzini	19	3	19	3
	MF	(Italy) ITA	Dante Ranieri	7	0	7	0
	MF	(Italy) ITA	Augusto Gaetano Avanzini	1	0	1	0
	MF	(Italy) ITA	Ernesto Morandi	21	2	21	2
	MF	(Italy) ITA	Alessandro Scarioni	18	0	18	0
	MF	(Italy) ITA	Eugenio Morandi	1	0	1	0
	MF	(Italy) ITA	Francesco Soldera	17	3	17	3
	MF	(Italy) ITA	Dionigi Corsi	9	4	9	4
	MF	(Italy) ITA	Giovanni Maggioni	1	0	1	0
	MF	(Italy) ITA	Luigi Gandolfi	2	0	2	0
	MF	(Italy) ITA	Amedeo Varese	15	6	15	6
	FW	(Italy) ITA	Romolo Ferrario	2	0	2	0
	FW	(Italy) ITA	Armando Bellolio	20	12	20	12
	FW	(Italy) ITA	Natale Loiacono	15	4	15	4
	FW	(Italy) ITA	Natale Beretta	1	0	1	0
	FW	(Italy) ITA	Carlo Bozzi	12	4	12	4
	FW	(Italy) ITA	Giuseppe Gelpi	1	0	1	0
	FW	(Italy) ITA	Giovanni Mazzoni	2	0	2	0
	FW	(Italy) ITA	Giuseppe Sangiorgi	7	0	7	0

== See also ==
- AC Milan

== Bibliography ==
- Almanacco illustrato del Milan, ed: 2, March 2005. Panini.
- Enrico Tosi. La storia del Milan, May 2005. Italia/Italy cid Tosi.
- Milan. Sempre con te, December 2009. Mondadori. 2009. ISBN 978-88-04-59118-4.
