= 1919–20 Milan FC season =

Italian football club season

Milan Football Club
1919–20 season
- President: Piero Pirelli
- Manager: Guido Moda
- Stadium: Campo di viale Lombardia, Campo Pirelli
- Italian Football Championship: 4th in the semifinals group stage
- Top goalscorer: League: Amedeo Varese (24); All: Amedeo Varese (24)
Home colours	Away colours

During the 1919–20 season Milan Football Club competed in the Italian Football Championship.

== Summary ==
This season, the Italian football championship resumed after the interruption caused by the First World War.

During this season, Milan changed their home ground, abandoning Velodromo Sempione to play a few matches at the Campo Pirelli in the Bicocca district before finally settling permanently at the new Viale Lombardia pitch. The squad was updated with the acquisition of players from the youth teams or from smaller teams in Lombardy. This strategy led to several difficulties in the league: after easily progressing through the qualifying round (10 wins in 10 matches), the Rossoneri were eliminated in the semifinal round by Genoa and Pro Vercelli. The revelation of the season was the stricker Amedeo Varese, who scored 24 goals in 18 games, and proving himself to be a valid replacement of Aldo Cevenini, who left the club before the beginning of the season to go to Inter.

== Squad ==
Note: Flags indicate national team as defined under FIFA eligibility rules; some limited exceptions apply. Players may hold more than one non-FIFA nationality.

Pos.	Nation	Player
GK	ITA	Luigi Binda
GK	ITA	Umberto Castellazzi
GK	ITA	Enrico Mariani
DF	ITA	Renzo Azaghi
DF	ITA	Guido Carito
DF	ITA	Marco Sala
DF	ITA	Emilio Colombo
MF	ITA	Dante Ranieri
MF	ITA	Amedeo Varese
MF	ITA	Pietro Bronzini
MF	ITA	Emilio Cazzaniga
MF	ITA	Carlo Marmonti
MF	ITA	Francesco Soldera

Pos.	Nation	Player
MF	ITA	Ernesto Morandi
MF	ITA	Eugenio Morandi
MF	ARG	Cesare Lovati
MF	ITA	Eugenio Negri
MF	ITA	Alessandro Scarioni (Captain)
FW	ITA	Romolo Ferrario
FW	ITA	Natale Loiacono
FW	ITA	Lorenzo Oleario De Bellagente
FW	ITA	Carlo Cevenini
FW	ITA	Mario Roghi
FW	ITA	Edoardo Mariani
FW	ITA	Arturo Crottini

=== Transfers ===
In
Pos.	Name	from	Type
FW	Natale Loiacono	Pirelli	-
MF	Eugenio Negri	Inter	-

Out
Pos.	Name	To	Type
FW	Aldo Cevenini	Inter	-
DF	Mario Cevenini	Inter	-
MF	Luigi Cevenini	Inter	-
FW	Arturo Crottini	Pro Sesto	-
GK	Armando Gambuti	Novara	-

== Competitions ==
=== Italian Football Championship ===
==== Group B Lombardy ====
12 October 1919 1	Milan	3-1	Chiasso	Milan
	Varese (?) (?); Roghi 53'	Report	67' Lurati II	Stadium: Campo Pirelli; Referee: Alfredo Franziosi

19 October 1919 2	Enotria Goliardo	1-4	Milan	Milan
	Bellolio (?)	Report	(?) (?) (?) Varese (?) Roghi	Stadium: Campo di via Colletta; Referee: Franco Varisco

26 October 1919 3	Pavia	1-6	Milan	Pavia
	Boni 6'	Report	12', 27', 38' Varese; 61' Mariani; 68', 78' (pen.) Roghi	Stadium: Velodromo Pavese; Referee: Romualdo Livraghi

2 November 1919 4	Atalanta	0-4	Milan	Bergamo
		Report	17', 27', 40', 75' Varese	Stadium: Ippodromo della Clementina; Referee: Stefano Bellandi

9 November 1919 5	Milan	3-1	Ausonia Pro Gorla	Milan
	Morandi 75'; Sala 84'; Ranieri 86'	Report	34' Mambrini II	Stadium: Campo Pirelli; Referee: Ugo Ferradini

23 November 1919 6	Chiasso	1-2	Milan	Maslianico
	Zapparoli 37'	Report	20' Varese; 74' (pen.) Cevenini V	Stadium: Campo Mornello; Referee: Luigi Barnabò

30 November 1919 7	Milan	3-1	Enotria Goliardo	Milan
	Mariani 37'; Ranieri 52'; Cevenini V 77' (pen.)	Report	68' Varalda	Stadium: Campo di via Bersaglio; Referee: Ugo Ferradini

7 December 1919 8	Milan	3-1	Pavia	Milan
	Roghi 23'; Varese 26'; Lovati 77' (pen.)	Report	12' Davoglio	Stadium: Campo di via Bersaglio; Referee: Luigi Barnabò

14 December 1919 9	Milan	5-1	Atalanta	Milan
	Varese 20', 25', 55'; Ferrario 47'; Roghi (?)	Report	Spalla	Stadium: Campo Pro Gorla; Referee: Ambrogio Quirci

21 December 1919 10	Ausonia Pro Gorla	0-10	Milan	Milan
		Report	(?) (?) (?) Varese (?) (?) (?) Oleario (?) (?) Ferrario (?) Loiacono (?) Soldera	Stadium: Campo Pro Gorla; Referee: Giuseppe Venegoni

==== Semifinals - Group A ====
4 January 1920 1	Genoa	2-1	Milan	Genova
	Sardi 67'; Dellacasa 79'	Report	27' Varese	Stadium: Marassi; Referee: Alberto Crivelli

1 February 1920 4	Milan	3-1	Legnano	Milan
	Morandi 50'; Ferrario 53', 72'	Report	75' Malaspina	Stadium: Campo di Viale Lombardia; Referee: Achille Gama

8 February 1920 5	Milan	1-2	Pro Vercelli	Milan
	Varese 20'	Report	73' Rosetta; 85' Rampini II	Stadium: Campo di Viale Lombardia; Referee: Giovanni Mauro

15 February 1920 2	Venezia	0-1	Milan	Venezia
		Report	53' (pen.) Lovati	Stadium: Campo Sant'Elena; Referee: Luigi Saverio Bertazzoni

29 February 1920 3	Alessandria	2-0	Milan	Alessandria
	Baloncieri 35', 53'	Report		Stadium: Campo degli Orti; Referee: Achille Gama

7 March 1920 6	Milan	0-2	Genoa	Milan
		Report	40' Dellacasa; 68' Santamaria	Stadium: Campo di viale Lombardia; Referee: Achille Gama

14 March 1920 7	Milan	2-1	Venezia	Milan
	Soldera I 15'; Ferrario 41'	Report	70' Bighin II	Stadium: Campo di viale Lombardia; Referee: Felice Brunetti

21 March 1920 8	Milan	3-0	Alessandria	Milan
	Ferrario 18'; Varese 50', 65'	Report		Stadium: Campo di viale Lombardia; Referee: Alberto Crivelli

18 April 1920 10	Pro Vercelli	5-1	Milan	Vercelli
	Milano III 39', 68'; Gay I 49', 60', 77'		44' Varese	Stadium: Campo Piazza Conte di Torino; Referee: Ugo Milano

2 May 1920 9	Legnano	1-1	Milan	Legnano
	Crespi 63'		62' Scarioni II	Stadium: Campo di via Lodi; Referee: Mario Tradico

== Statistics ==
=== Squad statistics ===
Competition	Points	Home						Away						Total						GD
Competition	Points	G	W	D	L	Gs	Ga	G	W	D	L	Gs	Ga	G	W	D	L	Gs	Ga	GD
1919–20 Prima Categoria	29	10	8	0	2	26	11	10	6	1	3	30	13	20	14	1	5	56	24	+32

=== Players statistics ===
No.	Pos	Nat	Player	Total		Italian Football Championship	
No.	Pos	Nat	Player	Apps	Goals	Apps	Goals
	GK	(Italy) ITA	Luigi Binda	9	-14	9	-14
	GK	(Italy) ITA	Umberto Castellazzi	3	-2	3	-2
	GK	(Italy) ITA	Enrico Mariani	8	-8	8	-8
	DF	(Italy) ITA	Marco Sala	8	1	8	1
	DF	(Italy) ITA	Guido Carito	1	0	1	0
	DF	(Italy) ITA	Renzo Azaghi	16	0	16	0
	DF	(Italy) ITA	Emilio Colombo	4	0	4	0
	MF	(Argentina) ARG	Cesare Lovati	19	2	19	2
	MF	(Italy) ITA	Pietro Bronzini	15	0	15	0
	MF	(Italy) ITA	Dante Ranieri	8	2	8	2
	MF	(Italy) ITA	Carlo Marmonti	1	0	1	0
	MF	(Italy) ITA	Ernesto Morandi	12	2	12	2
	MF	(Italy) ITA	Alessandro Scarioni	19	1	19	1
	MF	(Italy) ITA	Eugenio Morandi	1	0	1	0
	MF	(Italy) ITA	Francesco Soldera	12	2	12	2
	MF	(Italy) ITA	Emilio Cazzaniga	2	0	2	0
	MF	(Italy) ITA	Eugenio Negri	1	0	1	0
	MF	(Italy) ITA	Amedeo Varese	18	24	18	24
	FW	(Italy) ITA	Romolo Ferrario	10	8	10	8
	FW	(Italy) ITA	Lorenzo Oleario De Bellagente	5	3	5	3
	FW	(Italy) ITA	Natale Loiacono	10	1	10	1
	FW	(Italy) ITA	Mario Roghi	13	5	13	5
	FW	(Italy) ITA	Carlo Cevenini	9	2	9	2
	FW	(Italy) ITA	Edoardo Mariani	15	2	15	2

== See also ==
- AC Milan

== Bibliography ==
- Almanacco illustrato del Milan, ed: 2, March 2005. Panini.
- Enrico Tosi. La storia del Milan, May 2005. Italia/Italy cid Tosi.
- Milan. Sempre con te, December 2009. Mondadori. 2009. ISBN 978-88-04-59118-4.
