= 1916–17 Milan FBCC season =

Italian football club season

Milan Foot-Ball and Cricket Club
1916–17 season
- President: Piero Pirelli
- Manager: Vacant position
- Stadium: Velodromo Sempione
- Coppa Lombarda: Winner
- Top goalscorer: League: All: Aldo Cevenini (14)
Home colours	Away colours

During the 1916–17 season Milan Foot-Ball and Cricket Club competed in the Coppa Regionale Lombarda.

== Summary ==
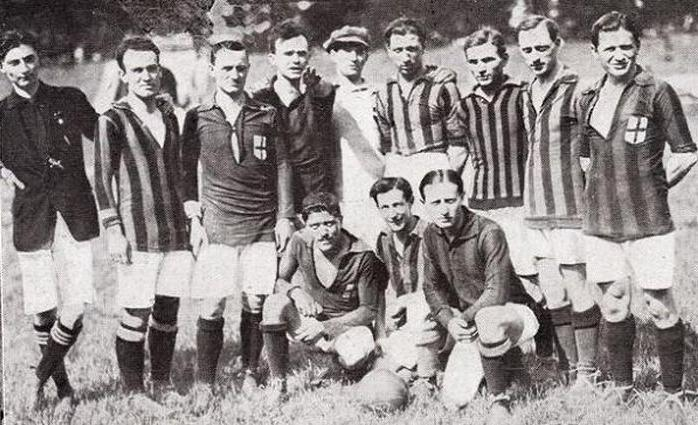
A Milan formation from the 1916-17 season.

The suspension of the Italian championship due to World War I continued into this season. Unlike the previous year, the federation was unable to organize national competitions, so only regional tournaments were arranged. Milan participated in the Coppa Regionale Lombarda alongside eight other teams.

The Rossoneri won the trophy, though it was never physically awarded to them, finishing ahead of Inter Milan and Legnano, thanks to the prolific scoring of Aldo Cevenini, who netted 14 goals in 12 matches. The team's performance was outstanding, boasting 10 wins in 12 games and 45 goals scored.

== Squad ==
Note: Flags indicate national team as defined under FIFA eligibility rules; some limited exceptions apply. Players may hold more than one non-FIFA nationality.

Pos.	Nation	Player
GK	ITA	Luigi Barbieri
GK	ITA	Luigi Brusa
GK	ITA	Edoardo Croce
GK	ITA	Carlo Ramponi
DF	ITA	Luigi Andreoli
DF	ITA	Marco Sala
DF	ITA	Amilcare Pizzi
DF	ITA	Ciro Mario Cevenini
MF	ITA	Pietro Bronzini
MF	ITA	Attilio Colombo
MF	ITA	Ernesto Morandi
MF	ITA	Emilio Cazzaniga
MF	ITA	Anselmo Greppi
MF	ITA	Francesco Soldera

Pos.	Nation	Player
MF	ITA	Oreste Perfetti
MF	ITA	Dionigi Corsi
MF	ARG	Cesare Lovati
MF	ITA	Carlo Marmonti
MF	ITA	Dante Ranieri
MF	ITA	Alessandro Scarioni
FW	ITA	Romolo Ferrario
FW	ITA	Aldo Cevenini (Captain)
FW	ITA	Luigi Cevenini
FW	BEL	Louis Van Hege
FW	ITA	Attilio Marchesi
FW	ITA	Giovanni Mazzoni
FW	ITA	Gustavo Zacchi
FW	ITA	Federico Orlandi

=== Transfers ===
In
Pos.	Name	from	Type
MF	Pietro Bronzini	Inter	–
DF	Mario Cevenini	Inter	–
FW	Dionigi Corsi	Enotria	–
GK	Edoardo Croce	Biellese	–
FW	Federico Orlandi	AC Milanese	–

Out
Pos.	Name	To	Type
MF	Mario Crespi	Legnano	–
GK	Armando Gambuti	Nazionale Lombardia	–

== Competitions ==
=== Coppa Regionale Lombarda ===
==== Group 1 ====
26 November 1916 1	Milan	8-2	Cremonese	Milan
	Zacchi 12', 25', 29'; A. Cevenini 21', 30', 52'; Van Hege 24'; Ferrario 77'		32' De Vecchi; 69' (o.g.) unknown	Stadium: Velodromo Sempione; Referee: Ugo Onore Balla

3 December 1916 2	Milan	4-1	US Milanese	Milan
	A. Cevenini (?); Ferrario (?)		(?) Conconi	Stadium: Velodromo Sempione; Referee: ?

18 February 1917 3	Enotria Milano	0-9	Milan	Milan
			(?) unknown (?) unknown (?) unknown (?) unknown (?) unknown (?) unknown (?) unknown (?) unknown (?) unknown	Stadium: Velodromo Sempione; Referee: Ugo Onore Balla

17 December 1916 4	Cremonese	3-5	Milan	Cremona
	unknown (?) unknown (?) unknown (?)		(?) unknown (?) unknown (?) unknown (?) unknown (?) unknown	Referee: Achille Gama

3 December 1916 5	US Milanese	0-2	Milan	Milan
			(?) A. Cevenini (?) Soldera	Stadium: Campo di via Stelvio; Referee: Achille Gama

7 January 1917 6	Milan	3-1	Enotria Milano	Milan
	Zacchi 15'; A. Cevenini 35'; Soldera (?)		55' Maestroni	Stadium: Velodromo Sempione; Referee: ?

==== Final round ====
25 February 1917 1	Legnano	1-0	Milan	Legnano
	Sodano 84'			Stadium: Campo di via Lodi; Referee: Achille Gama

4 March 1917 2	Milan	1-1	Inter	Milan
	Lovati 9'		68' Negri	Stadium: Velodromo Sempione; Referee: Rigoletto Trezzi

11 March 1917 3	Milan	2-1	US Milanese	Milan
	A. Cevenini 11'; Orlandi 63'		52' (o.g.) Sala	Stadium: Velodromo Sempione; Referee: Giuseppe Venegoni

25 March 1917 4	Milan	5-2	Legnano	Milan
	A. Cevenini 7', 65', 70'; Pizzi 68'; Soldera 83'		35' Crespi; 73' Sodano	Stadium: Velodromo Sempione; Referee: Ugo Onore Balla

1 April 1917 5	Inter	0-4	Milan	Milan
			6', 72' A. Cevenini; 40' Zacchi; 63' (o.g.) Engler	Stadium: Velodromo Sempione; Referee: Romildo Terzolo

13 May 1917 6	US Milanese	0-2	Milan	Milan
				Stadium: Campo di via Stelvio; Referee: Achille Gama

== Statistics ==
=== Squad statistics ===
Competition	Points	Home						Away						Total						GD
Competition	Points	G	W	D	L	Gs	Ga	G	W	D	L	Gs	Ga	G	W	D	L	Gs	Ga	GD
Coppa Regionale Lombarda 1916–17	14	6	5	1	0	23	8	6	5	0	1	22	4	12	10	1	1	45	12	+33

=== Players statistics ===
No.	Pos	Nat	Player	Total		Coppa Regionale Lombarda	
No.	Pos	Nat	Player	Apps	Goals	Apps	Goals
	GK	(Italy) ITA	Luigi Barbieri	5	-4	5	-4
	GK	(Italy) ITA	Luigi Brusa	1	-1	1	-1
	GK	(Italy) ITA	Edoardo Croce	1	-1	1	-1
	GK	(Italy) ITA	Carlo Ramponi	2	-3	2	-3
	DF	(Italy) ITA	Marco Sala	6	0	6	0
	DF	(Italy) ITA	Amilcare Pizzi	6	0	6	0
	DF	(Italy) ITA	Luigi Andreoli	7	0	7	0
	DF	(Italy) ITA	Ciro Mario Cevenini	2	0	2	0
	MF	(Argentina) ARG	Cesare Lovati	3	1	3	1
	MF	(Italy) ITA	Anselmo Greppi	8	1	8	1
	MF	(Italy) ITA	Dante Raineri	10	0	10	0
	MF	(Italy) ITA	Dionigi Corsi	1	0	1	0
	MF	(Italy) ITA	Carlo Marmonti	2	0	2	0
	MF	(Italy) ITA	Alessandro Scarioni	1	0	1	0
	MF	(Italy) ITA	Pietro Bronzini	3	0	3	0
	MF	(Italy) ITA	Attilio Colombo	2	0	2	0
	MF	(Italy) ITA	Francesco Soldera	12	4	12	4
	MF	(Italy) ITA	Ernesto Morandi	1	0	1	0
	MF	(Italy) ITA	Emilio Cazzaniga	9	0	9	0
	FW	(Italy) ITA	Romolo Ferrario	2	2	2	2
	FW	(Italy) ITA	Aldo Cevenini	12	14	12	14
	FW	(Italy) ITA	Luigi Cevenini	2	0	2	0
	FW	(Belgium) BEL	Louis Van Hege	1	1	1	1
	FW	(Italy) ITA	Attilio Marchesi	1	0	1	0
	FW	(Italy) ITA	Federico Orlandi	3	1	3	1
	FW	(Italy) ITA	Giovanni Mazzoni	1	0	1	0
	FW	(Italy) ITA	Gustavo Zacchi	8	5	8	5

== See also ==
- AC Milan

== Bibliography ==
- Almanacco illustrato del Milan, ed: 2, March 2005. Panini.
- Enrico Tosi. La storia del Milan, May 2005. Italia/Italy cid Tosi.
- Milan. Sempre con te, December 2009. Mondadori. 2009. ISBN 978-88-04-59118-4.
