= 1911–12 Milan FBCC season =

Italian football club season

Milan Foot-Ball and Cricket Club
1911–12 season
- President: Piero Pirelli
- Manager: Ernesto Belloni
- Stadium: Campo Milan di Porta Monforte; Arena Civica
- Italian Football Championship: 2nd
- Top goalscorer: League: Aldo Cevenini, Louis Van Hege (18); All: Aldo Cevenini, Louis Van Hege (18)
Home colours	Away colours

During the 1911–12 season Milan Foot-Ball and Cricket Club competed in the Italian Football Championship.

== Summary ==
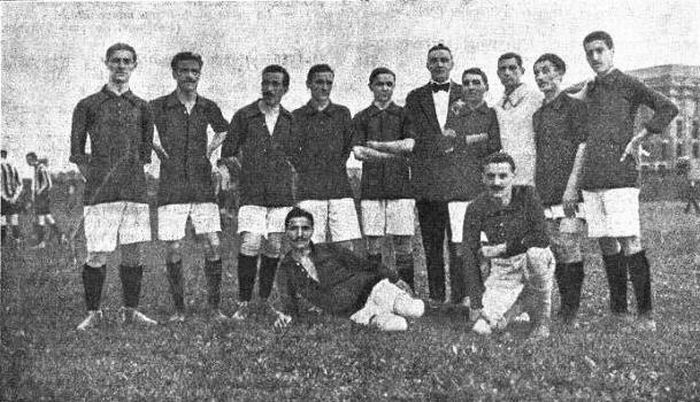
A Milan formation from the 1911-12 season.

The two-group championship formula of the previous season was confirmed for the 1911–12 edition. Milan once again obtained the second in the Liguria-Lombardy-Piedmont group, this time just one point behind the leaders Pro Vercelli. The excellent campaign was negatively impacted by the home draw on the first day with Piemonte, which at the end of the championship finished at the last place in the standings.

The season was excellent, with two large victories against Juventus (4–0 and 8–1), two successes against Inter (2–1 and 3–0), two draws with Pro Vercelli and a remarkable goal difference (60 goals scored and 10 conceded).

== Squad ==
Note: Flags indicate national team as defined under FIFA eligibility rules; some limited exceptions apply. Players may hold more than one non-FIFA nationality.

Pos.	Nation	Player
GK	ITA	Luigi Barbieri
DF	ITA	Renzo De Vecchi
DF	ITA	Attilio Colombo
DF	ITA	Guido Moda
DF	ITA	Marco Sala
DF	ITA	Giacomo Roseo
MF	ITA	Ernesto Morandi
MF	ITA	Alessandro Bovati
MF	ARG	Cesare Lovati
MF	SUI	Edi Ott

Pos.	Nation	Player
MF	ITA	Giuseppe Rizzi (Captain)
MF	ITA	Stefano Schiantarelli
MF	ITA	Alessandro Scarioni
MF	ITA	Attilio Trerè
FW	URU	Julio Bavastro
FW	ITA	Romolo Ferrario
FW	ITA	Pietro Lana
FW	ITA	Gustavo Carrer
FW	ITA	Aldo Cevenini
FW	ITA	Luigi Cevenini
FW	BEL	Louis Van Hege

== Competitions ==
=== Italian Football Championship ===
8 October 1911 1	Milan	1–1	Piemonte (1910–1914)	Milano
	Cevenini I 12'		25' (o.g.) De Vecchi	Stadium: Campo Milan di Porta Monforte; Referee: Goodley

15 October 1911 2	Pro Vercelli	1–1	Milan	Vercelli
	Milano II 67'		26' (pen.) Lana	Referee: G.Gama

22 October 1911 3	Milan	6–0	US Milanese	Milano
	Van Hege (?) (?) (?); Cevenini I (?); Lana (?); Rizzi (?)			Stadium: Campo Milan di Porta Monforte; Referee: Malvano

29 October 1911 4	Juventus	0–4	Milan	Torino
			45', 47', 85' Rizzi; 60' Cevenini I	Stadium: Stadio di Corso Sebastopoli; Referee: Pasteur (I)

5 November 1911 5	Milan	2–1	Inter	Milano
	De Vecchi 59' (pen.); Rizzi 79'		53' Bontadini III	Stadium: Campo Milan di Porta Monforte; Referee: Goodley

12 November 1911 6	Casale	0–1	Milan	Casale Monferrato
			65' Rizzi	Referee: Pasteur (II)

19 November 1911 7	Milan	3–1	Torino	Milano
	Cevenini I 13', 28'; Van Hege 60'		72' (pen.) Capello	Stadium: Campo Milan di Porta Monforte; Referee: G.Gama

26 November 1911 8	Genoa	1–0	Milan	Genova
	Herzog 16'			Stadium: Stadio Luigi Ferraris; Referee: G.Gama

3 December 1911 9	Milan	4–0	Andrea Doria	Milano
	Van Hege (?) (?); Cevenini I (?) (?)			Stadium: Campo Milan di Porta Monforte; Referee: Meazza

10 December 1911 10	Piemonte (1910–1914)	0–3	Milan	Torino
			48', 70' Bavastro II; 85' Van Hege	Stadium: Campo di Villa Rignon; Referee: Visconti

17 December 1911 11	Milan	2–2	Pro Vercelli	Milano
	Rizzi 36'; De Vecchi 45' (pen.)		38' Rampini I 41' Milano II	Stadium: Campo Milan di Porta Monforte; Referee: Goodley

7 January 1912 12	US Milanese	1–5	Milan	Milano
	Boldorini (?)		38' Cevenini I (?) (?) Van Hege (?) De Vecchi (?) Bavastro II	Stadium: Campo di via Stelvio; Referee: G.Gama

14 January 1912 13	Milan	8–1	Juventus	Milano
	Cevenini I 12'; Van Hege 20', 59', 65', 74', 75'; Rizzi 28', 85'		44' Besozzi	Stadium: Campo Milan di Porta Monforte; Referee: G.Gama

21 January 1912 14	Inter	0–3	Milan	Milano
			21' Carrer; 62', 82' Van Hege	Stadium: Campo di Ripa Ticinese; Referee: Pasteur (II)

28 January 1912 15	Milan	6–0	Casale	Milano
	Cevenini I (?) 36', 90'; Van Hege (?); Rizzi (?); Bavastro II (?)			Stadium: Campo Milan di Porta Monforte; Referee: Calì

4 February 1912 16	Torino	1–6	Milan	Torino
	Rubli 55'		10', 20', 23', 27', 88' Cevenini I 75' (pen.) De Vecchi	Stadium: Piazza d'Armi; Referee: Meazza

28 April 1912 17	Milan	1–0	Genoa	Milano
	Cevenini III 69'			Stadium: Campo Milan di Porta Monforte; Referee: G.Colombo

18 February 1912 18	Andrea Doria	0–4	Milan	Vercelli
			29' Cevenini I 31', 41' Rizzi; 67' Van Hege	Stadium: Campo Piazza Conte di Torino; Referee: Valvassori

== Statistics ==
=== Squad statistics ===
Competition	Points	Home						Away						Total						GD
Competition	Points	G	W	D	L	Gs	Ga	G	W	D	L	Gs	Ga	G	W	D	L	Gs	Ga	GD
1911–12 Prima Categoria	31	9	7	2	0	33	6	9	7	1	1	27	4	18	14	3	1	60	10	+50

=== Players statistics ===
No.	Pos	Nat	Player	Total		Italian Football Championship	
No.	Pos	Nat	Player	Apps	Goals	Apps	Goals
	GK	(Italy) ITA	Luigi Barbieri	18	-10	18	-10
	DF	(Italy) ITA	Guido Moda	1	0	1	0
	DF	(Italy) ITA	Marco Sala	12	0	12	0
	DF	(Italy) ITA	Attilio Colombo	11	0	11	0
	DF	(Italy) ITA	Renzo De Vecchi	18	4	18	4
	DF	(Italy) ITA	Giacomo Roseo	3	0	3	0
	MF	(Italy) ITA	Alessandro Scarioni	8	0	8	0
	MF	(Italy) ITA	Alessandro Bovati	16	0	16	0
	MF	(Italy) ITA	Attilio Trerè	15	0	15	0
	MF	(Argentina) ARG	Cesare Lovati	2	0	2	0
	MF	(Switzerland) SUI	Edi Ott	1	0	1	0
	MF	(Italy) ITA	Giuseppe Rizzi	15	12	15	12
	MF	(Italy) ITA	Stefano Schiantarelli	3	0	3	0
	MF	(Italy) ITA	Ernesto Morandi	1	0	1	0
	FW	(Italy) ITA	Romolo Ferrario	1	0	1	0
	FW	(Italy) ITA	Luigi Cevenini	1	1	1	1
	FW	(Italy) ITA	Gustavo Carrer	16	1	16	1
	FW	(Italy) ITA	Pietro Lana	5	2	5	2
	FW	(Uruguay) URU	Julio Bavastro	17	4	17	4
	FW	(Italy) ITA	Aldo Cevenini	17	18	17	18
	FW	(Belgium) BEL	Louis Van Hege	17	18	17	18

== See also ==
- AC Milan

== Bibliography ==
- Almanacco illustrato del Milan, ed: 2, March 2005. Panini.
- Enrico Tosi. La storia del Milan, May 2005. Italia/Italy cid Tosi.
- Milan. Sempre con te, December 2009. Mondadori. 2009. ISBN 978-88-04-59118-4.
