= 1917–18 Milan FBCC season =

Italian football club season

Milan Foot-Ball and Cricket Club
1917–18 season
- President: Piero Pirelli
- Manager: Vacant position
- Stadium: Velodromo Sempione
- Coppa Mauro: Winner
- Top goalscorer: League: All: Aldo Cevenini (19)
Home colours	Away colours

During the 1917–18 season Milan Foot-Ball and Cricket Club competed in the Coppa Mauro.

== Summary ==
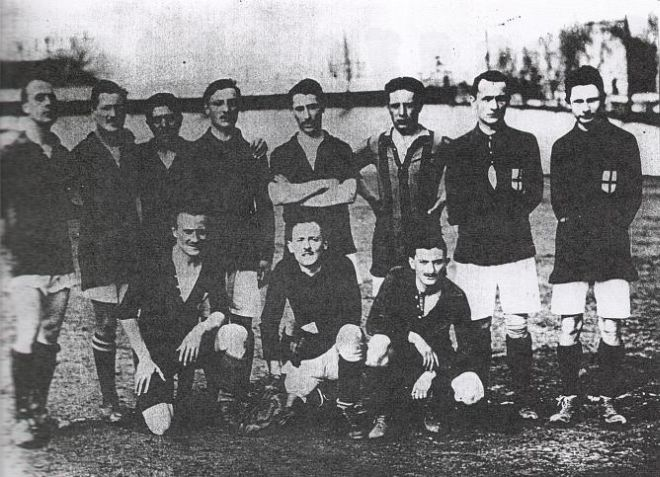
A Milan formation from the 1917-18 season.

This season, the championship continued to be suspended due to World War I. For Italy, the conflict was experiencing its bloodiest period due to the defeat at Caporetto, which saw the royal army crumble under the blows of the Austro-Hungarian troops. For this reason, the Italian football authorities decided to ban spectators from sporting events, which were then held behind closed doors.

Despite these difficulties, the federation managed to organize the Coppa Mauro, a regional competition which included, among others, Milan, Inter Milan, and Legnano. At the end of the tournament, the Rossoneri and Nerazzurri were tied for first place, partly due to some controversial disciplinary decisions that penalized Legnano. A play-off match was therefore necessary, which Milan won 8-1 over Inter. This remains the highest goal difference ever recorded in a Milan derby. The Coppa Mauro was AC Milan's third consecutive official wartime trophy. Once again, Aldo Cevenini was the top goalscorer of the club, with 19 goals in 11 games.

== Squad ==
Note: Flags indicate national team as defined under FIFA eligibility rules; some limited exceptions apply. Players may hold more than one non-FIFA nationality.

Pos.	Nation	Player
GK	ITA	Edoardo Croce
GK	ITA	Guido Ribera
DF	ITA	Luigi Andreoli
DF	ITA	Marco Sala
DF	ITA	Mario Fallai
DF	ITA	Mario Cevenini
MF	ITA	Cesare Cevenini
MF	ITA	Enio Moroni
MF	ITA	Emilio Cazzaniga
MF	ITA	Anselmo Greppi
MF	ITA	Francesco Soldera
MF	ITA	Luigi Riva

Pos.	Nation	Player
MF	ARG	Cesare Lovati
MF	ITA	Carlo Marmonti
MF	ITA	Alessandro Scarioni
FW	ITA	Romolo Ferrario
FW	ITA	Aldo Cevenini (Captain)
FW	ITA	Luigi Cevenini
FW	ITA	Carlo Cevenini
FW	ITA	Silvio Frigerio
FW	ITA	Alfredo Mambrini
FW	ITA	Armando Marini
FW	ITA	Pietro Poini

=== Transfers ===
In
Pos.	Name	from	Type
FW	Carlo Cevenini	Inter	–
MF	Cesare Cevenini	Inter	–
DF	Mario Fallai	Nazionale Lombardia	–
MF	Enio Moroni	AC Milanese	–
GK	Guido Ribera	US Milanese	–

Out
Pos.	Name	To	Type
FW	Federico Orlandi	AC Milanese	–
GK	Angelo Pellacani	Saronno	–
DF	Amilcare Pizzi	US Milanese	–
GK	Carlo Ramponi	Pro Sesto	–
FW	Louis Van Hege	Union Saint-Gilloise	–

== Competitions ==
=== Coppa Mauro ===
7 October 1917 1	Nazionale Lombardia	2-4	Milan	Milan
	Dotti (?)		(?) A. Cevenini	Referee: Ugo Onore Balla

14 October 1917 2	Legnano	2-3	Milan	Legnano
	Malaspina 33'; Sodano 37'		15', 27', 41' A. Cevenini	Stadium: Campo di via Lodi; Referee: Achille Gama

28 October 1917 3	Milan	3-0	US Milanese	Milan
	A. Cevenini (?) unknown (?) unknown (?)			Stadium: Campo di via Ravizza; Referee: Giuseppe Grossi

4 November 1917 4	Inter	1-0	Milan	Milan
	Aebi 85'			Stadium: Campo di via Goldoni; Referee: Rigoletto Trezzi

11 November 1917 5	Enotria Milano	1-3	Milan	Milan
	Bonello 62' (pen.)		40', 85' A. Cevenini; 45' Poini	Stadium: Campo di via Colletta; Referee: Giuseppe Venegoni

18 November 1917 6	Milan	2-1	Saronno	Milan
	Scarioni 25'; A. Cevenini (?)		(?) Bojocchi	Stadium: Velodromo Sempione; Referee: Alberto Crivelli

25 November 1917 7	Milan	4-0	Nazionale Lombardia	Milan
	A. Cevenini 44' (pen.), 45'; Ca. Cevenini (?)			Stadium: Velodromo Sempione; Referee: Alberto Crivelli

2 December 1917 8	Milan	1-2	Legnano	Milan
	Soldera 1'		5', 69' Sodano	Stadium: Velodromo Sempione; Referee: Luigi Barnabò

16 December 1917 9	US Milanese	1-2	Milan	Milan
	Giustacchini 9'		58' A. Cevenini; 67' Marini	Stadium: Campo di via Stelvio; Referee: Alberto Crivelli

23 December 1917 10	Milan	1-0	Inter	Milan
	Marini 85'			Stadium: Velodromo Sempione; Referee: ?

30 December 1917 11	Milan	2-0	Enotria Milano	Milan
				Stadium: Velodromo Sempione

1 January 1918 12	Saronno	0-2	Milan	Saronno

==== Play off ====
3 March 1918 1	Milan	8-1	Inter	Milan
	A. Cevenini 11', 25', 62', 66', 80'; L. Cevenini 68', 73'; Marini 88'		55' Scheidler	Stadium: Velodromo Sempione; Referee: ?

== Statistics ==
=== Squad statistics ===
Competition	Points	Home						Away						Total						GD
Competition	Points	G	W	D	L	Gs	Ga	G	W	D	L	Gs	Ga	G	W	D	L	Gs	Ga	GD
Coppa Mauro 1917–18	22	7	6	0	1	21	4	6	5	0	1	14	7	13	11	0	2	35	11	+24

=== Players statistics ===
No.	Pos	Nat	Player	Total		Coppa Mauro	
No.	Pos	Nat	Player	Apps	Goals	Apps	Goals
	GK	(Italy) ITA	Edoardo Croce	1	0	1	0
	GK	(Italy) ITA	Guido Ribera	11	-11	11	-11
	DF	(Italy) ITA	Marco Sala	9	0	9	0
	DF	(Italy) ITA	Mario Fallai	4	0	4	0
	DF	(Italy) ITA	Luigi Andreoli	11	0	11	0
	DF	(Italy) ITA	Mario Cevenini	1	0	1	0
	MF	(Argentina) ARG	Cesare Lovati	1	0	1	0
	MF	(Italy) ITA	Anselmo Greppi	1	0	1	0
	MF	(Italy) ITA	Cesare Cevenini	1	0	1	0
	MF	(Italy) ITA	Enio Moroni	6	0	6	0
	MF	(Italy) ITA	Carlo Marmonti	5	0	5	0
	MF	(Italy) ITA	Alessandro Scarioni	10	1	10	1
	MF	(Italy) ITA	Luigi Riva	1	0	1	0
	MF	(Italy) ITA	Francesco Soldera	10	1	10	1
	MF	(Italy) ITA	Emilio Cazzaniga	10	0	10	0
	FW	(Italy) ITA	Romolo Ferrario	0	0	0	0
	FW	(Italy) ITA	Aldo Cevenini	11	19	11	19
	FW	(Italy) ITA	Luigi Cevenini	1	2	1	2
	FW	(Italy) ITA	Arnaldo Marini	3	3	3	3
	FW	(Italy) ITA	Alfredo Mambrini	6	0	6	0
	FW	(Italy) ITA	Carlo Cevenini	8	2	8	2
	FW	(Italy) ITA	Silvio Frigerio	1	0	1	0
	FW	(Italy) ITA	Pietro Poini	7	1	7	1

== See also ==
- AC Milan

== Bibliography ==
- Almanacco illustrato del Milan, ed: 2, March 2005. Panini.
- Enrico Tosi. La storia del Milan, May 2005. Italia/Italy cid Tosi.
- Milan. Sempre con te, December 2009. Mondadori. 2009. ISBN 978-88-04-59118-4.
