= 1918–19 Milan FBCC season =

Italian football club season

Milan Foot-Ball and Cricket Club
1918–19 season
- President: Piero Pirelli
- Manager: Technical committee
- Stadium: Velodromo Sempione
- Coppa Mauro: 2nd
- Top goalscorer: League: All: Aldo Cevenini and Carlo Cevenini (5)
Home colours	Away colours

During the 1918–19 season Milan Foot-Ball and Cricket Club competed in the Coppa Mauro.

== Summary ==
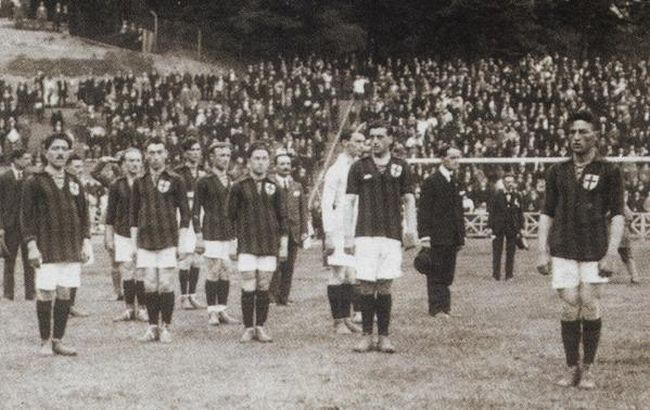
A photo of the Milan team from the 1918-19 season.

This was the last season in which the Italian football championship was not held due to the First World War. For Italy, the conflict ended on the 3rd of November 1918, with the signing of the Armistice of Villa Giusti.

The Italian football federation was still unable to organize an official championship, but rather limited itself, as in previous years, to organizing regional tournaments in which the major football teams of the time participated. The participation expanded, given the return of many players who had been conscripted to fight at the front. Milan participated for the secon year in a row in the Coppa Mauro, finishing second behind Legnano. In March 1919, the club changed its name from "Milan Foot-Ball and Cricket Club" to "Milan Football Club".

== Squad ==
Note: Flags indicate national team as defined under FIFA eligibility rules; some limited exceptions apply. Players may hold more than one non-FIFA nationality.

Pos.	Nation	Player
GK	ITA	Armando Gambuti
GK	ITA	Filippo Pellizzoni
DF	ITA	Renzo Azaghi
DF	ITA	Pio Boggio
DF	ITA	Marco Sala
DF	ITA	Mario Fallai
DF	ITA	Mario Cevenini
MF	ITA	Amedeo Varese
MF	ITA	Luigi Savi
MF	ITA	Emilio Cazzaniga
MF	ITA	Anselmo Greppi
MF	ITA	Francesco Soldera

Pos.	Nation	Player
MF	ITA	Ernesto Morandi
MF	ITA	Eugenio Morandi
MF	ARG	Cesare Lovati
MF	ITA	Guglielmo Gajani
MF	ITA	Alessandro Scarioni
FW	ITA	Romolo Ferrario
FW	ITA	Aldo Cevenini (Captain)
FW	ITA	Luigi Cevenini
FW	ITA	Carlo Cevenini
FW	ITA	Carlo Bozzi
FW	ITA	Edoardo Mariani
FW	ITA	Arturo Crottini

=== Transfers ===
In
Pos.	Name	from	Type
DF	Renzo Azaghi	Nazionale Lombardia	-
DF	Pio Boggio	Piemonte	-
FW	Arturo Crottini	Saronno	-
GK	Armando Gambuti	Enotria	-
GK	Filippo Pellizzoni	Alessandria	-
MF	Luigi Savi	Inter	-

Out
Pos.	Name	To	Type
MF	Cesare Cevenini	Inter	-
GK	Edoardo Croce	US Milanese	-
MF	Silvio Frigerio	Ausonia	-
FW	Alfredo Mambrini	Ausonia	-
FW	Armando Marini	US Milanese	-
GK	Guido Ribera	US Milanese	-

== Competitions ==
=== Coppa Mauro ===
12 January 1919 1	Milan	4-3	Inter	Milan
	A. Cevenini 3'; Er. Morandi 73'; Binda (?); Mariani (?)		5', 15' Perin; 25' Bergamino	Stadium: Velodromo Sempione; Referee: Giuseppe Venegoni

19 January 1919 2	Legnano	6-2	Milan	Legnano
	Colombo I 10'; Raso 22'; Malaspina 30'; Sodano 44', 70' unknown (?)		35' A. Cevenini; 65' Ed. Mariani	Stadium: Campo di via Lodi; Referee: Alberto Crivelli

26 January 1919 3	Milan	2-2	US Milanese	Milan
	C. Cevenini 35'; Ed. Mariani 78'		44' Mosso; 67' D'Agradi	Stadium: Velodromo Sempione; Referee: ?

2 February 1919 4	Saronno	1-3	Milan	Saronno
	unknown (?)		19' Ferrario; 87' A. Cevenini; 88' C. Cevenini	Referee: Pareau

9 February 1919 5	Milan	6-1	Enotria Milano	Milan
	C. Cevenini 10', 20', 77'; Crottini 52', 89'; A. Cevenini 56'		26' Bellolio	Stadium: Campo di via Bersaglio; Referee: Umberto Brambilla

16 February 1919 6	Inter	2-5	Milan	Milan
	Agradi 6'; Conti 11'		35' (pen.), 40', 49', 86' L. Cevenini; 88' Ed. Mariani	Stadium: Velodromo Sempione; Referee: Alberto Crivelli

2 March 1919 7	Milan	0-0	Legnano	Milan
				Stadium: Velodromo Sempione; Referee: Achille Gama

9 March 1919 8	US Milanese	2-1	Milan	Milan
	Badini 67', 80'		89' (pen.) Scarioni	Stadium: Campo di via Stelvio; Referee: Alberto Crivelli

16 March 1919 9	Milan	2-0	Saronno	Milan
	A. Cevenini 30'; Ferrario 33'			Stadium: Velodromo Sempione; Referee: Achille Gama

23 March 1919 10	Enotria Milano	0-3	Milan	Milan
			(?) ? (?) ? (?) ?	Stadium: Campo di via Goldoni; Referee: Pareau

== Statistics ==
=== Squad statistics ===
Competition	Points	Home						Away						Total						GD
Competition	Points	G	W	D	L	Gs	Ga	G	W	D	L	Gs	Ga	G	W	D	L	Gs	Ga	GD
Coppa Mauro 1918–19	14	5	3	2	0	14	6	15	3	0	2	14	11	10	6	2	2	28	17	+11

=== Players statistics ===
No.	Pos	Nat	Player	Total		Coppa Mauro	
No.	Pos	Nat	Player	Apps	Goals	Apps	Goals
	GK	(Italy) ITA	Armando Gambuti	2	-9	2	-9
	GK	(Italy) ITA	Filippo Pellizzoni	8	-8	8	-8
	DF	(Italy) ITA	Marco Sala	9	0	9	0
	DF	(Italy) ITA	Mario Fallai	5	0	5	0
	DF	(Italy) ITA	Renzo Azaghi	2	0	2	0
	DF	(Italy) ITA	Mario Cevenini	1	0	1	0
	MF	(Argentina) ARG	Cesare Lovati	9	0	9	0
	MF	(Italy) ITA	Anselmo Greppi	2	0	2	0
	DF	(Italy) ITA	Pio Boggio	1	0	1	0
	MF	(Italy) ITA	Guglielmo Gajani	0	0	0	0
	MF	(Italy) ITA	Ernesto Morandi	10	1	10	1
	MF	(Italy) ITA	Alessandro Scarioni	9	1	9	1
	MF	(Italy) ITA	Eugenio Morandi	1	0	1	0
	MF	(Italy) ITA	Francesco Soldera	9	0	9	0
	MF	(Italy) ITA	Emilio Cazzaniga	3	0	3	0
	MF	(Italy) ITA	Luigi Savi	1	0	1	0
	MF	(Italy) ITA	Amedeo Varese	2	0	2	0
	FW	(Italy) ITA	Romolo Ferrario	7	2	7	2
	FW	(Italy) ITA	Aldo Cevenini	10	5	10	5
	FW	(Italy) ITA	Luigi Cevenini	3	3	3	3
	FW	(Italy) ITA	Carlo Bozzi	1	0	1	0
	FW	(Italy) ITA	Arturo Crottini	1	2	1	2
	FW	(Italy) ITA	Carlo Cevenini	6	5	6	5
	FW	(Italy) ITA	Edoardo Mariani	8	4	8	4

== See also ==
- AC Milan

== Bibliography ==
- Almanacco illustrato del Milan, ed: 2, March 2005. Panini.
- Enrico Tosi. La storia del Milan, May 2005. Italia/Italy cid Tosi.
- Milan. Sempre con te, December 2009. Mondadori. 2009. ISBN 978-88-04-59118-4.
