= 1922–23 Milan FC season =

Italian football club season

Milan Football Club
1922–23 season
- President: Piero Pirelli
- Manager: Heinrich Oppenheim
- Stadium: Campo di viale Lombardia
- Italian Football Championship: 4th in the Group B of the Northern League
- Top goalscorer: League: Giuseppe Santagostino (11); All: Giuseppe Santagostino (11)
Home colours	Away colours

During the 1922–23 season Milan Football Club competed in the Italian Football Championship.

== Summary ==
This season, the two federations (CCI and FIGC) merged back into a single body that returned to govern a single championship. The tournament changed its name from Prima Categoria to Prima Divisione and was still organized in regional groups. There were three groups in Northern Italy, each with 12 teams. Milan had a decent season, finishing fourth in Group B behind Genoa (who would go on to win the title), Legnano, and Bologna, with eight wins, ten draws, and four losses. Among the Rossoneri, Ernesto Morandi, Francesco Soldera, and Giuseppe Santagostino stood out for their performances during the tournament; the latter was also the topscorer with 11 goals. Austrian Heinrich Oppenheim was appointed as Milan's coach this season: for the first time, the club hired a true coach in the modern sense of the term.

== Squad ==
Note: Flags indicate national team as defined under FIFA eligibility rules; some limited exceptions apply. Players may hold more than one non-FIFA nationality.

Pos.	Nation	Player
GK	ITA	Bruno Midali
GK	ITA	Giuseppe Norsa
DF	ITA	Eugenio Allievi
DF	ITA	Umberto Soldati
DF	ITA	Giovanni Belloni
MF	ITA	Tiziano Ballarin
MF	ITA	Alfredo De Franceschini
MF	ITA	Bruno Carcano
MF	ITA	Pietro Bronzini
MF	ITA	Dionigi Corsi
MF	ITA	Francesco Soldera (Captain)

Pos.	Nation	Player
MF	ITA	Ernesto Morandi
MF	ITA	Bassano Daccò
MF	ITA	Ferdinando Trabattoni
MF	ITA	Oreste Perfetti
FW	ITA	Enrico Forneris
FW	ITA	Venerino Papa
FW	ITA	Luigi Poggia
FW	ITA	Giuseppe Santagostino
FW	ITA	Gustavo Zacchi
FW	ITA	Francesco Pluderi
FW	ITA	Andrea Simontacchi

=== Transfers ===
In
Pos.	Name	from	Type
MF	Tiziano Ballarin	Nazionale Lombardia	-
MF	Bassano Daccò	AC Libertas	-
GK	Bruno Midali	Marelli	-
MF	Oreste Perfetti	Enotria Goliardo	-

Out
Pos.	Name	To	Type
DF	Renzo Azaghi	Cremonese	-
GK	Luigi Binda	Novara	-
FW	Natale Loiacono	Derthona	-

== Competitions ==
=== Italian Football Championship ===
==== Group B - Northern League ====
8 October 1922 1	Genoa	4-1	Milan	Genova
	Santamaria 6', 27'; Bellini 60'; Catto 68'	Report	73' (pen.) Bronzini	Stadium: Campo Genoa Cricket & Football Club; Referee: Umberto Mombelli

15 October 1922 2	Milan	1-1	Udinese	Milano
	Zacchi 50'	Report	15' Moretti	Stadium: Campo di viale Lombardia; Referee: Achille Gama

22 October 1922 3	Milan	2-1	Cremonese	Milano
	Bronzini 9' (pen.); Zacchi 85'	Report	76' Bonzio	Stadium: Campo di viale Lombardia; Referee: Giacomo Pinasco

5 November 1922 4	Milan	0-8	Bologna	Milano
		Report	4', 41', 53', 66', 71', 72' Della Valle III; 82', 89' Alberti	Stadium: Campo di viale Lombardia; Referee: Felice Brunetti

12 November 1922 5	Derthona	0-0	Milan	Tortona
		Report		Stadium: Campo Fornaci

19 November 1922 6	Milan	4-0	Rivarolese	Milano
	Santagostino 15', 46', 80'; Poggia 53'	Report		Stadium: Campo di viale Lombardia; Referee: Roberto Gera

24 December 1922 7	Modena	1-1	Milan	Modena
	Dugoni (?)	Report	23' Santagostino	Stadium: Campo di viale Fontanelli; Referee: Giovanni Canestrini

17 December 1922 8	Milan	0-0	Spezia	Milano
		Report		Stadium: Campo di viale Lombardia; Referee: Ricci

7 January 1923 9	Juventus	2-2	Milan	Torino
	Monticone 8' (pen.); Ferraris 60'	Report	40' (pen.), 45' Santagostino	Referee: Fortunato Olivari

14 January 1923 10	Esperia	1-4	Milan	Como
	Bardoli 68'	Report	Poggia; 34', 41' Santagostino; 58' Papa III	Stadium: Campo di via Milano; Referee: Achille Gama

21 January 1923 11	Milan	1-0	Legnano	Milano
	Ballarin 8'	Report		Stadium: Campo di viale Lombardia; Referee: Giovanni Battista Zennaro

4 February 1923 12	Milan	1-3	Genoa	Milano
	Santagostino 35'	Report	30' Catto; 50', 72' Santamaria	Stadium: Campo di viale Lombardia; Referee: Luigi Saverio Bertazzoni

11 February 1923 13	Udinese	1-6	Milan	Udine
	Moretti (?)	Report	(?) Papa III (?) Santagostino (?) Poggia (?) Ballarin	Stadium: Campo di via Mentana; Referee: Ermete Alfieri

18 February 1923 14	Cremonese	0-1	Milan	Cremona
		Report	21' Poggia	Stadium: Campo di via Persico; Referee: Giovanni Battista Zennaro

11 March 1923 15	Bologna	0-2	Milan	Bologna
		Report		Stadium: stadium Sterlino; Referee: Ricci

18 March 1923 16	Milan	1-1	Derthona	Milano
	Soldera I 54'	Report	12' Crotti	Stadium: Campo di viale Lombardia; Referee: Fortunato Olivari

25 March 1923 17	Rivarolese	1-1	Milan	Genova
	Vannozzi 12'	Report	18' (o.g.) Taverna	Stadium: Campo della Torbella; Referee: Sante Sanguineti

1 April 1923 18	Milan	1-0	Modena	Milano
	Forneris 89'	Report		Stadium: Campo di viale Lombardia; Referee: Achille Gama

8 April 1923 19	Spezia	2-1	Milan	Viareggio
	Rossi 19'; Amadesi 35'	Report	78' Forneris	Referee: Domenico Canepa

22 April 1923 20	Milan	0-0	Juventus	Milano
		Report		Stadium: Campo di viale Lombardia; Referee: Giovanni Battista Zennaro

29 April 1923 21	Milan	1-1	Esperia	Milano
	Belloni 54'	Report	50' Bazzani	Stadium: Campo di viale Lombardia; Referee: Giacomo Pinasco

6 May 1923 22	Legnano	1-1	Milan	Legnano
	Allemandi 63' (pen.)	Report	57' Santagostino	Stadium: stadium di via Pisacane; Referee: Domenico Enrietti

== Statistics ==
=== Squad statistics ===
Competition	Points	Home						Away						Total						GD
Competition	Points	G	W	D	L	Gs	Ga	G	W	D	L	Gs	Ga	G	W	D	L	Gs	Ga	GD
1922–23 Prima Divisione	26	11	4	5	2	12	15	11	4	5	2	20	13	22	8	10	4	32	28	+4

=== Players statistics ===
No.	Pos	Nat	Player	Total		Italian Football Championship	
No.	Pos	Nat	Player	Apps	Goals	Apps	Goals
	GK	(Italy) ITA	Bruno Midali	15	-14	15	-14
	GK	(Italy) ITA	Giuseppe Norsa	7	-14	7	-14
	DF	(Italy) ITA	Umberto Soldati	21	0	21	0
	DF	(Italy) ITA	Giovanni Belloni	1	0	1	0
	DF	(Italy) ITA	Eugenio Allevi	9	0	9	0
	DF	(Italy) ITA	Ferdinando Trabattoni	1	0	1	0
	MF	(Italy) ITA	Tiziano Ballarin	19	2	19	2
	MF	(Italy) ITA	Pietro Bronzini	22	2	22	2
	MF	(Italy) ITA	Bruno Carcano	1	0	1	0
	MF	(Italy) ITA	Dionigi Corsi	2	0	2	0
	MF	(Italy) ITA	Ernesto Morandi	8	0	8	0
	MF	(Italy) ITA	Oreste Perfetti	19	0	19	0
	MF	(Italy) ITA	Alfredo De Franceschini	19	0	19	0
	MF	(Italy) ITA	Francesco Soldera	20	1	20	1
	MF	(Italy) ITA	Bassano Daccò	5	0	5	0
	FW	(Italy) ITA	Luigi Poggia	18	4	18	4
	FW	(Italy) ITA	Enrico Forneris	10	2	10	2
	FW	(Italy) ITA	Francesco Pluderi	1	0	1	0
	FW	(Italy) ITA	Giuseppe Santagostino	21	11	21	11
	FW	(Italy) ITA	Gustavo Zacchi	2	1	2	1
	FW	(Italy) ITA	Venerino Papa	21	4	21	4
	FW	(Italy) ITA	Andrea Simontacchi	1	0	1	0

== See also ==
- AC Milan

== Bibliography ==
- Almanacco illustrato del Milan, ed: 2, March 2005. Panini.
- Enrico Tosi. La storia del Milan, May 2005. Italia/Italy cid Tosi.
- Milan. Sempre con te, December 2009. Mondadori. 2009. ISBN 978-88-04-59118-4.
