= Marco Sala =

Marco Sala may refer to:

- Marco Sala (footballer, born 1886)
- Marco Sala (footballer, born 1999)
