= Delfo Bellini =

Italian footballer (1900-1953)

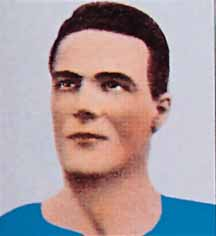
- Portrait of Delfo Bellini.

Personal information
- Full name: Antonio Giovanni Battista Delfo Bellini
- Date of birth: 13 January 1900
- Place of birth: Rivarolo Ligure, Italy
- Date of death: 11 September 1953 (aged 53)
- Position: Defender

Senior career*
Years	Team	Apps	(Gls)
1919–1922	Sampierdarenese		
1922–1925	Genoa	52	(9)
1925–1927	Inter Milan	48	(1)
1927–1928	Genoa	9	(1)
1927–1928	La Dominante Genova	3	(1)

International career
1924–1928	Italy	8	(0)
Medal record
Italy
Summer Olympics
Bronze medal – third place	Summer Olympics	1928 Amsterdam
- * Club domestic league appearances and goals

Delfo Bellini (Italian pronunciation: [ˈdɛlfo belˈliːni]; 13 January 1900 – 11 September 1953) was an Italian footballer who played as a defender. He competed in the 1928 Summer Olympics with the Italy national football team.

== International career ==
Bellini was a member of the Italy national team that won the bronze medal in the 1928 Summer Olympic football tournament.

== Honours ==
=== International ===
Italy

- Olympic Bronze Medal: 1928
