= Emilio Agradi =

Italian footballer (1895–1971)

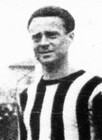

Personal information
- Date of birth: 12 July 1895
- Place of birth: Bologna, Italy
- Date of death: 11 September 1971 (aged 76)
- Place of death: Italy
- Position: Striker

Senior career*
Years	Team	Apps	(Gls)
1914–1921	Inter Milan	55	(54)
1921–1922	Modena	?	(?)
1922–1928	Inter Milan	111	(8)
- * Club domestic league appearances and goals

Emilio Agradi (12 July 1895 – 11 September 1971) was an Italian footballer who played for Inter Milan between 1914 and 1928, except during the 1921–22 season, when he played for Modena.
