= Bruno Dugoni =

Italian footballer (1905-1959)

Personal information
- Date of birth: 30 March 1905
- Place of birth: Modena, Kingdom of Italy
- Date of death: 30 August 1959 (aged 54)
- Height: 1.68 m (5 ft 6 in)
- Position: Midfielder

Senior career*
Years	Team	Apps	(Gls)
1922–1932	Modena	205	(11)
1932–1934	Roma	48	(3)
1934–1939	Modena	89	(3)
1940–1941	Rimini	15	(2)

International career
1925–1932	Italy	4	(0)
Medal record
Italy
Central European International Cup
Silver medal – second place	1931-32 Central European International Cup
- * Club domestic league appearances and goals

Bruno Dugoni (Italian pronunciation: [ˈbruːno duˈɡoːni]; 30 March 1905 – 30 August 1959) was an Italian professional footballer who played as a midfielder.

== Club career ==
Dugoni played six seasons (161 games, nine goals) in the Serie A for Modena F.C. and A.S. Roma.

== International career ==
Dugoni made his Italy national football team debut on 4 November 1925 against Yugoslavia, and made one start for Italy in the silver winning 1931-32 Central European International Cup campaign.

Italy

- Central European International Cup: Runner-up: 1931-32
