= Mario Meneghetti =

Italian footballer

Personal information
- Date of birth: 4 February 1893
- Place of birth: Novara, Italy
- Date of death: 24 February 1942 (aged 49)
- Place of death: Novara, Italy
- Position: Midfielder

Senior career*
| Years | Team | Apps | (Gls) |
| 1912–1925 | Novara | 65 | (20) |
| 1925–1927 | Juventus | 43 | (1) |
| 1927–1930 | Novara | 64 | (4) |
| 1930–1932 | Seregno | | |
| 1932–1933 | Novara | 1 | (0) |

International career
| 1920 | Italy | 4 | (0) |
- * Club domestic league appearances and goals

Mario Meneghetti (Italian pronunciation: [ˈmaːrjo meneˈɡetti]; 4 February 1893 – 24 February 1942) was an Italian footballer who played as a midfielder. He competed for Italy in the men's football tournament at the 1920 Summer Olympics.
