= Ettore Reynaudi =

Italian footballer (1895-1968)

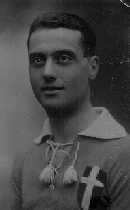

Personal information
- Date of birth: 4 November 1895
- Place of birth: Novara, Italy
- Date of death: 17 June 1968 (aged 72)
- Position: Midfielder

Senior career*
Years	Team	Apps	(Gls)
1911–1915	Novara		
1915–1919	Juventus		
1920–1927	Novara	61	(7)
1927–1928	Juventus	2	(0)
1928–1929	Novara	5	(0)
1929–1930	Monza	2	(0)

International career
1920–1921	Italy	6	(0)
- * Club domestic league appearances and goals

Ettore Reynaudi (Italian pronunciation: [ˈɛttore reiˈnaudi]; 4 November 1895 – 17 June 1968) was an Italian footballer who played as a midfielder. He competed for Italy in the men's football tournament at the 1920 Summer Olympics.
