= Percy Walsingham =

English footballer

Personal information
- Full name: Percy Graham Walsingham
- Date of birth: 1888
- Place of birth: London, England
- Position: Forward

Senior career*
Years	Team	Apps	(Gls)
- Millwall
- Clapton Orient
- Chelmsford
1912–1916	Genoa	39	(29)
1916–1919	Bologna		
1920–1921	Genoa	8	(2)
Total		48	(31)
- * Club domestic league appearances and goals

Percy Graham Walsingham (born 1888) was an English professional footballer who played as a forward.

== Career ==
After playing in England for Millwall, Clapton Orient and Chelmsford, Walsingham moved to Italy to play for Genoa and Bologna.
