= Franco Varisco =

Italian footballer

Personal information
- Full name: Franco Varisco
- Date of birth: 10 April 1887
- Place of birth: Milan, Italy
- Date of death: 23 April 1970 (aged 83)
- Place of death: Sanremo, Italy
- Position: Defender

Senior career*
| Years | Team | Apps | (Gls) |
| 1905–1910 | US Milanese | 34 | (13) |

International career
| 1910 | Italy | 2 | (0) |
- * Club domestic league appearances and goals

Franco Varisco (Italian pronunciation: [ˈfraŋko vaˈrisko]; 10 April 1887 – 23 April 1970) was an Italian footballer who played as a defender. He represented the Italy national football team twice, the first being Italy's first ever match on 15 May 1910, the occasion of a friendly match against France in a 6–2 home win.
