= Pietro Lana =

Italian footballer (1888–1950)

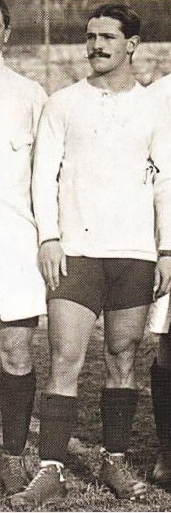

Personal information
- Full name: Pietro Lana
- Date of birth: 10 October 1888
- Place of birth: Milan, Kingdom of Italy
- Date of death: 6 December 1950 (aged 62)
- Place of death: Milan, Italy
- Height: 1.66 m (5 ft 5 1/2 in)
- Position: Striker

Senior career*
Years	Team	Apps	(Gls)
1907–1914	Milan	51	(18)
1916–1917	Brescia	0	(0)
Total		51	(18)

International career
1910	Italy	2	(3)
- * Club domestic league appearances and goals

Pietro Lana (Italian pronunciation: [ˈpjɛː(t)ro ˈlaːna]; 10 October 1888 – 6 December 1950) was an Italian professional footballer, who played as a striker. In 1910, he scored the first ever goal of the Italy national football team.

== Club career ==
Lana spent almost his entire career with Milan, making 51 official league appearances for the club, and scoring 18 goals between 1907 and 1914; he made his professional debut with the club in a 3–2 win over inter-city rivals Internazionale, on 10 January 1909, and made his final appearance for the club on 1 March 1914, in a 1–1 home draw against U.S. Milanese. Between 1916 and 1917, he also played for Brescia during the First World War, although he did not make a competitive appearance with the team.

== International career ==
At international level, Lana scored three goals for Italy in two appearances, both which came in 1910. He is widely remembered for scoring the first goal in the history of the Italy national team during his international debut, on 15 May 1910, in a 6–2 win over France. During the match he scored all three of his international goals, including one from a penalty. His second and final appearance for Italy came on 26 May, in a 6–1 defeat to Hungary.

== Style of play ==
A talented and extroverted forward, Lana was known for his technical skills, and his ability to both score and assist goals, and was usually deployed as an inside forward on the left, but could also play as a striker.
