= Attilio Trerè =

Italian footballer (1887–1943)

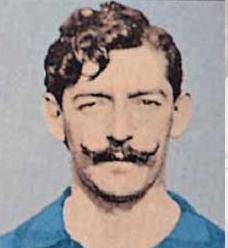

Personal information
- Full name: Attilio Trerè
- Date of birth: 9 October 1887
- Place of birth: Milan, Kingdom of Italy
- Date of death: 2 January 1943 (aged 55)
- Place of death: Rome, Italy
- Height: 1.67 m (5 ft 5 1/2 in)
- Positions: Midfielder; goalkeeper (Note: Trerè played a goalkeeper earlier in his career.)

Youth career
- Giovine Italia

Senior career*
| Years | Team | Apps | (Gls) |
| 1905–1909 | Milan | 13 | (2) |
| 1909–1910 | Ausonia | | |
| 1911–1915 | Milan | 62 | (17) |

International career
| 1910–1914 | Italy | 5 | (0) |
- * Club domestic league appearances and goals

Attilio Trerè (Note: More properly, but less commonly, spelled Attilio Treré [atˈtiːljo treˈre].) (9 October 1887 – 2 January 1943) was an Italian professional footballer, who played as a midfielder, and in his early years as a goalkeeper. His brother, Alessandro, also played for Milan as a footballer. Attilio is a member of the A.C. Milan Hall of Fame. He represented the Italy national football team five times, the first being Italy's first ever match on 15 May 1910, the occasion of a friendly match against France in a 6–2 home win. He was also part of Italy's squad for the football tournament at the 1912 Summer Olympics, but he did not play in any matches.
