= Amedeo Varese =

Italian footballer (1890-1969)

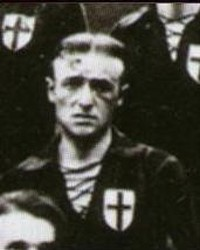
- Amedeo Varese.

Personal information
- Full name: Amedeo Varese
- Date of birth: 2 July 1890
- Place of birth: Settimo Rottaro, Italy
- Date of death: 4 January 1969 (aged 78)
- Place of death: Saluzzo, Italy
- Position: Midfielder

Senior career*
Years	Team	Apps	(Gls)
1909–1915	Casale	83	(37)
1915–1916	Modena	1	(1)
1918–1921	Milan	33	(29)
1921–1933	Casale	1	(0)

International career
1913–1914	Italy	5	(0)
- * Club domestic league appearances and goals

Amedeo Varese (Italian pronunciation: [ameˈdɛːo vaˈreːze; -eːse]; 2 July 1890 – 4 January 1969) was an Italian footballer who played as a midfielder. He represented the Italy national football team five times, the first being on 12 January 1913, the occasion of a friendly match against France in a 1–0 away loss.

== Honours ==
=== Player ===
Casale

- Italian Football Championship: 1913–14
