= Pietro Bronzini =

Italian footballer

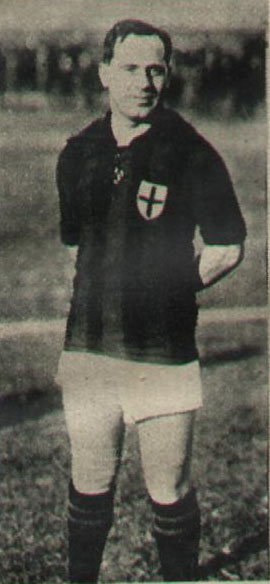

Personal information
- Full name: Pietro Bronzini
- Date of birth: 8 January 1898
- Place of birth: Milan, Italy
- Date of death: 21 February 1962 (aged 64)
- Place of death: Milan, Italy
- Height: 1.68 m (5 ft 6 in)
- Position: Midfielder

Youth career
- Milan

Senior career*
Years	Team	Apps	(Gls)
1914–1915	AC Milanese	?	(?)
1915–1916	Internazionale	?	(?)
1916–1917	A.C. Milan	4	(0)
1919–1926	A.C. Milan	139	(5)
1927–1928	Farini Milano	?	(?)
1928–1929	Gallaratese	?	(?)
Total		143	(5)
- * Club domestic league appearances and goals

Pietro Bronzini (8 January 1898 – 21 February 1962) was an Italian professional footballer who played as a midfielder.
