= Amilcare Pizzi =

Italian footballer

Personal information
- Date of birth: 23 January 1898
- Place of birth: Milan, Italy
- Date of death: 27 August 1974 (aged 76)
- Place of death: Guello di Bellagio, Italy
- Position: Defender

Senior career*
Years	Team	Apps	(Gls)
- US Milanese
1914–1917	Milan	19	(2)
- * Club domestic league appearances and goals

Amilcare Pizzi (23 January 1898 – 27 August 1974) was an Italian typographer and footballer, who played as a defender.

He played for US Milanese and Milan.

In 1914, using the 2,000 lire he had earned as a signing fee from Milan, he founded the publishing house Arti Grafiche Amilcare Pizzi.

== Honours ==
Individual

- Capocannoniere: 1908
