= Renzo De Vecchi =

Italian footballer (1894–1967)

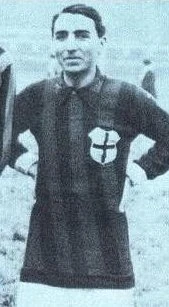
- Renzo De Vecchi in A.C. Milan

Personal information
- Date of birth: 3 February 1894
- Place of birth: Milan, Italy
- Date of death: 14 May 1967 (aged 73)
- Height: 1.63 m (5 ft 4 in)
- Positions: Left back; centre back

Senior career*
Years	Team	Apps	(Gls)
1909–1913	Milan	64	(7)
1913–1917	Genoa	51	(7)
1919–1929	Genoa	220	(32)
Total		335	(46)

International career
1910–1925	Italy	43	(0)

Managerial career
- 1927–1930: Genoa
- 1930–1933: Rapallo
- 1933–1935: Genoa
- * Club domestic league appearances and goals

Renzo De Vecchi (Italian pronunciation: [ˈrɛntso de ˈvɛkki]; 3 February 1894 – 14 May 1967) was an Italian football player and coach who played as a defender. He competed in the 1912 Summer Olympics with Italy, and is officially the youngest player to have ever played a match for the Italy national side. Regarded as one of Italy's greatest-ever players, he was known for his excellent technique, dribbling skills, and his accuracy from penalty kicks, despite being a defender. As a ball-winning full-back, he was known for his strength, tackling ability, anticipation, and his organisational skills on the left flank, and was also capable of playing in the centre or in midfield.

== Club career ==
Born in Milan, Renzo De Vecchi is the youngest player to play in a Serie A game for A.C. Milan, making his debut at 15 years and 284 days, on 14 November 1909, in a 2–1 home win over Ausonia. Two weeks later, he scored in a 6–2 away defeat to Torino, on 28 November 1909, making him the youngest scorer in a Serie A game for A.C. Milan, a record he holds to this day.

He soon became a member of the starting line-up on the left side of the back-line, although he was also capable of playing in the centre or even in midfield. Due to his class and playing ability, he was given the nickname "Il Figlio di Dio" (The Son of God) by the Milan fans. He later moved to Genoa in 1913, winning three Italian League titles during his time with the club, before retiring in 1929. Between 1927 and 1929, he worked as a player-manager for Genoa, and during the 1929–30 season, after retiring as a player, he became the club's manager for a season, temporarily moving to Rapallo in 1930, for three seasons. He returned to Genoa in 1933, and he helped the club to gain Serie A promotion, winning the 1934–35 Serie B title, before retiring, after which he pursued a coaching career.

== International career ==
De Vecchi is the youngest official player to feature in a match for the Italy national team at 16 years, three months and 23 days, making his international debut as a substitute on 26 May 1910, in a 6–1 away defeat to Hungary. As a member of the Italian Olympic squad in 1912, he played one match in the main tournament as well as two matches in the consolation tournament; he also represented Italy at the 1920 and 1924 Summer Olympic Games. He served as Italy's captain between 1920 and 1925. In total, he made 43 appearances for Italy between 1910 and 1925.

== After retirement ==
Following his retirement as a manager, De Vecchi worked as a journalist for La Gazzetta dello Sport.

== Honours ==
=== Player ===
Genoa

- Italian Football Championship: 1914–15, 1922–23, 1923–24

=== Coach ===
Genoa

- Serie B: 1934–35
