= Luigi Cevenini =

Italian footballer (1895–1968)

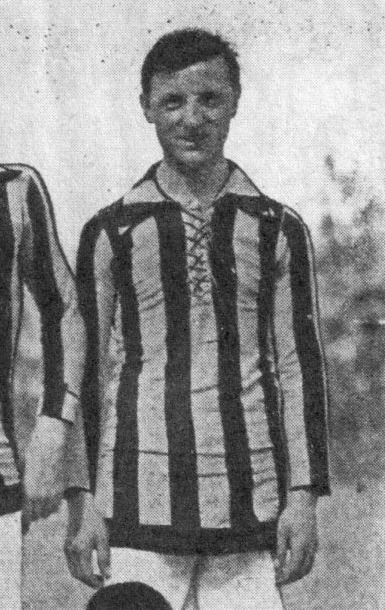
- Cevenini III with Inter Milan in the 1920–21 season

Personal information
- Date of birth: 13 March 1895
- Place of birth: Milan, Italy
- Date of death: 23 July 1968 (aged 73)
- Place of death: Villa Guardia, Italy
- Position: Forward

Senior career*
Years	Team	Apps	(Gls)
1910–1911	Libertas Milano	10	(19)
1911–1912	AC Milan	1	(1)
1912–1915	Inter Milan	55	(65)
1915–1919	AC Milan	0	(0)
1919–1921	Inter Milan	40	(55)
1921–1922	Novese	19	(6)
1922–1927	Inter Milan	95	(44)
1927–1930	Juventus	67	(22)
1930–1932	Messina	49	(28)
1932–1933	Peloro Messina	17	(4)
1933–1934	Novara	5	(0)
1934–1935	Comense	15	(5)
1938–1939	Varese	8	(1)
	Arezzo	8	(1)
Total		375	(231)

International career
1915–1929	Italy	29	(11)

Managerial career
- 1930–1933: Messina
- 1934–1935: Comense
- 1939: Arezzo
Medal record
Italy
Central European International Cup
Gold medal – first place	1927-30 Central European International Cup
- * Club domestic league appearances and goals

Luigi Cevenini (Italian: [luˈiːdʒi tʃeveˈniːni]; 13 March 1895 – 23 July 1968) was an Italian football player and coach. A forward, he holds the record for the all-time most goals scored in a single Italian league season at 37 goals with Inter Milan during the 1913–14 season.

== Club career ==
Throughout his career, Cevenini played 192 times for Inter Milan and scored 166 goals, winning the Italian Prima Divisione title in 1920.

== International career ==
With the Italy national football team, Cevenini scored 11 goals in 29 matches between 1915 and 1929, winning the 1927–30 Central European International Cup, playing the first 2 matches. He was Italy's captain between 1925 and 1927.

== Personal life ==
His older brothers Aldo Cevenini and Mario Cevenini and younger brothers Cesare Cevenini and Carlo Cevenini all played football professionally, with Aldo playing 11 games for Italy. To distinguish them, Aldo was known as Cevenini I, Mario as Cevenini II, Luigi as Cevenini III, Cesare as Cevenini IV and Carlo as Cevenini V.

== Honours ==
Inter Milan

- Prima Categoria: 1919–20

Novese

- Prima Categoria: 1921–22

Italy

- Central European International Cup: 1927–30

Individual

- Capocannoniere: 1913–14 (37 goals), 1920–21 (31 goals)

Sporting positions
Preceded by Renzo De Vecchi	Italy captain 1925–1927	Succeeded by Adolfo Baloncieri
