= Louis Van Hege =

Belgian footballer and bobsledder

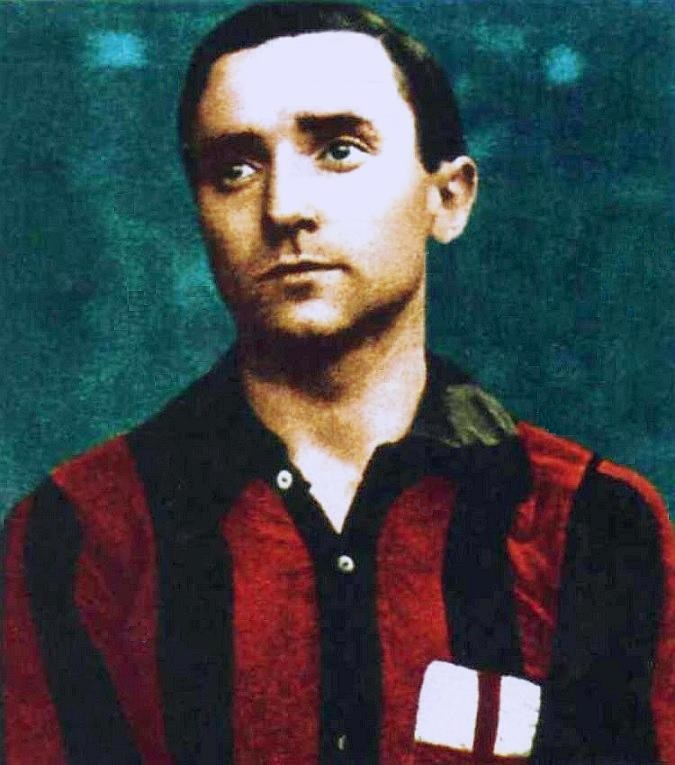
- Louis Van Hege in the AC Milan shirt.

Personal information
- Full name: Louis Van Hege
- Date of birth: 8 May 1889
- Place of birth: Uccle, Belgium
- Date of death: 24 June 1975 (aged 86)
- Place of death: Uccle, Belgium
- Height: 1.68 m (5 ft 6 in)
- Position: Striker

Youth career
- 1900–1906: R.U. Saint-Gilloise

Senior career*
Years	Team	Apps	(Gls)
1906–1910	R.U. Saint-Gilloise	42	(15)
1910–1917	Milan	91	(98)
1917–1924	R.U. Saint-Gilloise	90	(9)

International career
1919–1924	Belgium	12	(3)
Medal record
Men's football
Representing Belgium
Olympic Games
Gold medal – first place	1920 Antwerp	Team
- * Club domestic league appearances and goals

Louis Van Hege (8 May 1889 – 24 June 1975) was a Belgian footballer who played as an inside-forward.

== Club career ==
At club level, Van Hege played for Italian side A.C. Milan from 1910 to 1915, scoring 97 goals during five Italian Football Championship seasons with the rossoneri, and also serving as the club's captain between 1913 and 1915. In terms of goals scored, he's the tenth-highest goalscorer in the club's history. He left Italy when the First World War began.

== International career ==
At international level, Van Hege competed in the 1920 Summer Olympics as a member of the Belgium national team which won the gold medal in the football tournament.

== Bobsleigh career ==
Van Hege also competed in bobsleigh at the 1932 Winter Olympics, finishing ninth in the two-man event.

== Career statistics ==
=== Club ===
Italian football championship statistics

Season	League	
Season	Apps	Goals
1910–1911	16	19
1911–1912	17	18
1912–1913	18	17
1913–1914	17	21
1914–1915	20	22
1915–1916	2	0
1916–1917	1	1
Total	90	98

Sporting positions
Preceded by Giuseppe Rizzi	Milan captain 1913–1915	Succeeded by Marco Sala
