= Velodromo Sempione =

Multi-purpose stadium in Milan, Italy

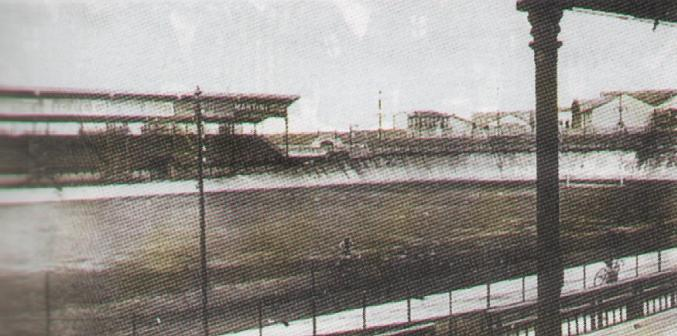
- Location: Milan, Italy
- Owner: City of Milan

Construction
- Opened: 27 April 1914
- Demolished: 1928

Tenants
- A.C. Milan (1914–1919); US Milanese; Sport Club Italia

The Velodromo Sempione was a multi-purpose stadium in Milan, Italy, which was inaugurated on 27 April 1914.

It hosted a variety of sport events, including cycling, rugby, football, boxing, and basketball.

The velodrome hosted various editions of the Giro di Lombardia. The Sempione also hosted the rugby matches of Sport Club Italia and the football matches of US Milanese and AC Milan.

In the 1920s, it was the home ground for the Italy national football team twice.
