= Aldo Cevenini =

Italian footballer and coach (1889-1973)

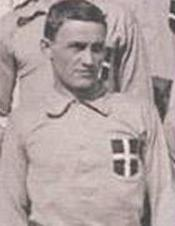

Personal information
- Date of birth: 8 November 1889
- Place of birth: Arona, Kingdom of Italy
- Date of death: 26 October 1973 (aged 83)
- Place of death: Deiva Marina, Italy
- Position: Striker

Senior career*
Years	Team	Apps	(Gls)
1908–1909	Libertas Milano	9	(?)
1909–1912	Milan	42	(26)
1912–1915	Internazionale	51	(42)
1915–1919	Milan	0	(0)
1919–1921	Internazionale	18	(2)
1921–1922	Novese	15	(0)
1922–1923	Internazionale	22	(2)
Total		148	(72)

International career
1910–1915	Italy	11	(4)

Managerial career
- 1929–1930: Atalanta
- * Club domestic league appearances and goals

Aldo Cevenini (Italian pronunciation: [ˈaldo tʃeveˈniːni]; 8 November 1889 – 26 October 1973) was an Italian professional football player and coach who played as a forward.

== Club career ==
Cevenini began his career with Libertas Milano, and later played for Milan, where he also later served as the team's captain, as well as cross-city rivals Inter, and Novese. He won the Italian championship in the 1919–20 and 1921–22 season, with Inter and Novese respectively.

== International career ==
Cevenini made his debut for the Italy national football team in the team's first ever game on 15 May 1910 against France.

== Personal life ==
Aldo's younger brothers Mario Cevenini, Luigi Cevenini, Cesare Cevenini and Carlo Cevenini all played football professionally. To distinguish them, Aldo was known as Cevenini I, Mario as Cevenini II, Luigi as Cevenini III, Cesare as Cevenini IV and Carlo as Cevenini V.

== Honours ==
=== Player ===
Inter

- Serie A: 1919–20

Novese

- Serie A: 1921–22

Sporting positions
Preceded by Marco Sala	Milan captain 1916–1919	Succeeded by Alessandro Scarioni
