= Alessandro Scarioni =

Italian footballer (1889-1966)

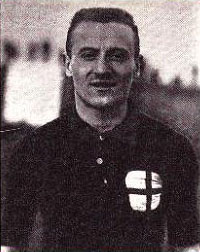

Personal information
- Full name: Alessandro Scarioni
- Date of birth: 8 March 1889
- Place of birth: Milan, Italy
- Date of death: 22 June 1966 (aged 77)
- Place of death: Milan, Italy
- Height: 1.68 m (5 ft 6 in)
- Position: Midfielder

Senior career*
Years	Team	Apps	(Gls)
1908–1915	Milan	87	(1)
1916–1921	Milan	37	(1)
Total		124	(2)
- * Club domestic league appearances and goals

Alessandro Scarioni (8 March 1889 – 22 June 1966) was an Italian professional footballer, who played as a midfielder.

Sporting positions
Preceded by Aldo Cevenini	Milan captain 1919–1921	Succeeded by Cesare Lovati
