= Francesco Soldera =

Italian footballer (1892–1957)

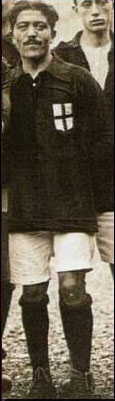

Personal information
- Full name: Francesco Soldera
- Date of birth: 28 December 1892
- Place of birth: Milan, Italy
- Date of death: 20 February 1957 (aged 64)
- Place of death: Milan, Italy
- Height: 1.60 m (5 ft 3 in)
- Position: Midfielder

Senior career*
Years	Team	Apps	(Gls)
- U.S. Milanese
1914–1924	Milan	108	(9)
1924–1925	Internazionale	1	(0)
- * Club domestic league appearances and goals

Francesco Soldera (28 December 1892 – 20 February 1957) was an Italian professional footballer who played as a midfielder.
