= Piero Pirelli =

Italian entrepreneur (1881–1956)

Piero Pirelli, born Piero Carlo Pirelli, (27 January 1881 – 7 August 1956), was an Italian entrepreneur and the son of Giovanni Battista Pirelli, the founder of Pirelli.

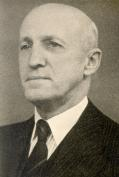
Piero Pirelli

== Biography ==
Born in Milan to Giovanni Battista Pirelli and Maria Sormani. He studied in Genoa and graduated with a degree in legal sciences.

In 1904, he traveled to the United States of America to learn more about electrical cables. He returned to Italy to use his knowledge to further improve his father's business.

Piero enlisted in the Italian army as a cavalry officer, and participated in the First World War. He returned from the Italian front in 1918. Upon returning, he went back to the family business, of which he became president of in 1932 after the death of his father.

Passionate about sports, he created the "Pirelli Sports Group" in 1918 by ordering the construction of the "Pirelli field" in front of the Bicocca degli Arcimboldi in Viale Sarca. From 1909 to 1928, he held the position of president of AC Milan. Serving as president, he built the San Siro stadium at his own expense in 1926.

His tyre company Pirelli have also been the main shirt sponsor of neighbouring club Inter Milan for 27 years since the 1995–96 season up until the 2021–22 season, when the club signed a partnership with fan engagement platform Socios.com.

In 1948, and on the 50th anniversary of the FIGC, he was awarded the title of Pioneer of Italian football.

He is buried in the family tomb at the Cimitero Monumentale di Milano.
