= Cesare Lovati =

Argentinian-born Italian footballer and manager (1891-1961)

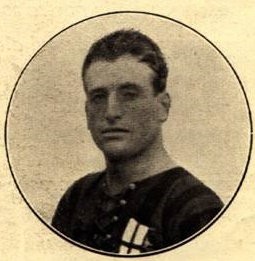

Personal information
- Full name: Cesare Lovati
- Date of birth: 25 December 1891
- Place of birth: Buenos Aires, Argentina
- Date of death: 22 July 1961 (aged 69)
- Place of death: Varese, Italy
- Height: 1.71 m (5 ft 7 in)
- Position: Defensive midfielder

Senior career*
Years	Team	Apps	(Gls)
1910–1915	AC Milan	42	(3)
1916–1922	AC Milan	62	(3)
Total		104	(6)

International career
1920–1921	Italy	6	(0)

Managerial career
- 1923–1927: Atalanta
- 1928–1929: Monza
- 1933–1934: Monza
- 1934–1935: Seregno
- * Club domestic league appearances and goals

Cesare Lovati (Italian pronunciation: [ˈtʃeːzare loˈvaːti, ˈtʃɛː-]; 25 December 1891 – 22 July 1961) was an Argentine-born Italian professional footballer, who played as a midfielder, and football manager. He played for the Italy national team at the 1920 Summer Olympics.
