= Marco Sala (footballer, born 1886) =

Italian footballer

Personal information
- Full name: Marco Sala
- Date of birth: 19 August 1886
- Place of birth: Cornate d'Adda, Italy
- Date of death: 14 December 1969 (aged 83)
- Place of death: Milan, Italy
- Height: 1.70 m (5 ft 7 in)
- Position: Right back

Senior career*
Years	Team	Apps	(Gls)
1908–1920	Milan	90	(3)
1921–1922	Internazionale	18	(0)
Total		108	(3)

International career
1912	Italy	1	(0)
- * Club domestic league appearances and goals

Marco Sala (Italian pronunciation: [ˈmarko ˈsaːla]; 19 August 1886 – 14 December 1969) was an Italian professional footballer, who played as a defender.

Sporting positions
Preceded by Louis Van Hege	Milan captain 1915–1916	Succeeded by Aldo Cevenini
