= 1910–11 Milan FBCC season =

Italian football club season

Milan Foot-Ball and Cricket Club
1910–11 season
- President: Piero Pirelli
- Manager: Giannino Camperio
- Stadium: Campo Milan di Porta Monforte; Arena Civica
- Italian Football Championship: 2nd
- Top goalscorer: League: Louis Van Hege (19); All: Louis Van Hege (19)
Home colours	Away colours

During the 1910–11 season Milan Foot-Ball and Cricket Club competed in the Italian Football Championship.

== Summary ==
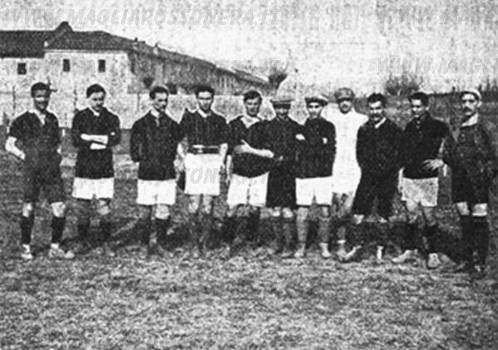
A Milan formation from the 1910-11 season.

This season the organization of the Championship changed again. Two groups were set up, one Ligurian-Lombard-Piedmontese, in which Milan took part together with the strongest teams of the time, and one Veneto-Emilian. The Rossoneri had a good season, competing for the top spot in the group with Pro Vercelli.

Following several home defeats, Milan finished second in the standings and did not qualify for the next phase. During the season, the club signed Belgian striker Louis Van Hege, top scorer of the championship with 19 goals and played for Milan as striker for five seasons.

== Squad ==
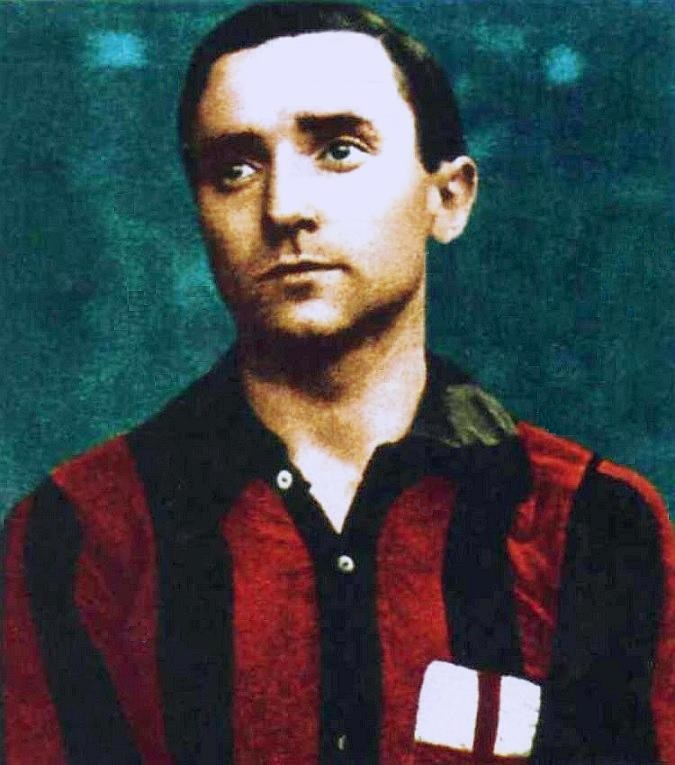
Louis Van Hege played with AC Milan between 1910 and 1915.

Note: Flags indicate national team as defined under FIFA eligibility rules; some limited exceptions apply. Players may hold more than one non-FIFA nationality.

Pos.	Nation	Player
GK	ITA	Luigi Barbieri
GK	BEL	Roger Piérard
DF	ITA	Renzo De Vecchi
DF	ITA	Attilio Colombo
DF	ITA	Guido Moda
DF	ITA	Marco Sala
MF	ITA	Giulio Ermolli
MF	ITA	Alessandro Bovati
MF	ARG	Cesare Lovati
MF	ITA	Gian Guido Piazza

Pos.	Nation	Player
MF	ITA	Giuseppe Rizzi
MF	BEL	Max Tobias (Captain)
MF	ITA	Alessandro Scarioni
MF	ITA	Attilio Trerè
FW	URU	Julio Bavastro
FW	ITA	Franco Bontadini
FW	ITA	Pietro Lana
FW	ITA	Gustavo Carrer
FW	ITA	Aldo Cevenini
FW	BEL	Louis Van Hege

== Competitions ==
=== Italian Football Championship ===
27 November 1910 1	Genoa	0–3	Milan	Genova
			26', 37' Van Hege; 65' Tobias	Stadium: Ponte Carrega; Referee: Bertinetti

4 December 1910 2	Milan	0–0	Pro Vercelli	Milano
				Stadium: Campo Milan di Porta Monforte; Referee: Malvano

11 December 1910 3 (Note: Rest day for Milan)	v

18 December 1910 4	US_Milanese	3–6	Milan	Milano
	Varisco (?); Morbelli 77'; Bojocchi 89' (pen.)		1' (o.g.) Boldorini; 18' Tobias; 32', 83' Cevenini I 38' (pen.) Van Hege; 68' Bontadini III	Stadium: Campo di via Stelvio; Referee: G.Gama

28 May 1911 5 (Note: Match postponed)	Milan	7–1	Piemonte (1910–1914)	Milano
	Tobias 5' (pen.), (?); Van Hege 17', 25', (?), (?), (?)		(?) Bigatto	Stadium: Campo Milan di Porta Monforte; Referee: G.Gama

4 June 1911 6	Andrea Doria	1–7	Milan	Genova
	Sardi (?)		(?), (?), (?), (?) Van Hege (?), (?) Tobias (?) Cevenini I	Stadium: Campo sportivo della Cajenna; Referee: Magni

14 May 1911 7	Milan	5–2	Torino	Milano
	Tobias (?), (?); Cevenini I (?); Rizzi (?); Carrer (?)		(?) Bachmann I (?) Bachmann II	Stadium: Campo Milan di Porta Monforte; Referee: Magni

29 January 1911 8	Juventus	0–2	Milan	Torino
			17' Van Hege; 85' Cevenini I	Stadium: Stadio di Corso Sebastopoli; Referee: Pasteur I

5 February 1911 9	Inter	0–2	Milan	Milano
			64' Tobias; 77' Van Hege	Stadium: Arena Civica; Referee: Meazza

12 February 1911 10	Milan	2–0	Genoa	Milano
	Van Hege 22', 83' (pen.)			Stadium: Arena Civica; Referee: Magni

19 February 1911 11	Pro Vercelli	1–0	Milan	Vercelli
	Valle 55'			Referee: Meazza

26 February 1911 12	v

5 March 1911 13	Milan	0–2	US Milanese	Milano
			20' Morbelli; 42' Verga	Stadium: Campo Milan di Porta Monforte; Referee: G.Colombo

12 March 1911 14	Piemonte (1910–1914)	0–0	Milan	Torino
				Referee: Malvano

19 March 1911 15	Milan	0–1	Andrea Doria	Milano
			1' (o.g.) De Vecchi	Stadium: Campo Milan di Porta Monforte; Referee: G.Gama

26 March 1911 16	Torino	5–1	Milan	Vercelli
	Capello (?); Bachmann I (?); Bachmann II (?); Trerè II (?); Capra (?)		(?) Lana	Stadium: Piazza d'Armi; Referee: Goodley

23 April 1911 17	Milan	3–0 (Note: When the score was 3–0 for Milan, Juventus players left the pitch as a protest. The official score was maintained as such.)	Juventus	Milano
	Van Hege (?); Cevenini I (?), 71'			Stadium: Campo Milan di Porta Monforte; Referee: Magni

30 April 1911 18	Milan	6–3	Inter	Milano
	Tobias (?), (?); Van Hege (?), (?); Carrer (?); Lana (?)		(?), (?) Engler (?) Trerè II	Stadium: Campo Milan di Porta Monforte; Referee: Magni

== Statistics ==
=== Squad statistics ===
Competition	Points	Home						Away						Total						GD
Competition	Points	G	W	D	L	Gs	Ga	G	W	D	L	Gs	Ga	G	W	D	L	Gs	Ga	GD
1910–11 Prima Categoria	22	8	5	1	2	23	9	8	5	1	2	21	10	16	10	2	4	44	19	+25

=== Players statistics ===
No.	Pos	Nat	Player	Total		Italian Football Championship	
No.	Pos	Nat	Player	Apps	Goals	Apps	Goals
	GK	(Italy) ITA	Luigi Barbieri	16	-19	16	-19
	DF	(Italy) ITA	Guido Moda	5	0	5	0
	DF	(Italy) ITA	Marco Sala	8	0	8	0
	DF	(Italy) ITA	Attilio Colombo	6	0	6	0
	DF	(Italy) ITA	Renzo De Vecchi	16	0	16	0
	DF	(Belgium) BEL	Roger Piérard	0	0	0	0
	MF	(Italy) ITA	Giulio Ermolli	1	0	1	0
	MF	(Italy) ITA	Alessandro Scarioni	15	0	15	0
	MF	(Italy) ITA	Alessandro Bovati	2	0	2	0
	MF	(Italy) ITA	Attilio Trerè	8	0	8	0
	MF	(Argentina) ARG	Cesare Lovati	2	0	2	0
	MF	(Italy) ITA	Gian Guido Piazza	1	0	1	0
	MF	(Italy) ITA	Giuseppe Rizzi	14	1	14	1
	MF	(Belgium) BEL	Max Tobias	16	11	16	11
	FW	(Italy) ITA	Franco Bontadini	7	1	7	1
	FW	(Italy) ITA	Gustavo Carrer	9	2	9	2
	FW	(Italy) ITA	Pietro Lana	15	2	15	2
	FW	(Uruguay) URU	Julio Bavastro	7	0	7	0
	FW	(Italy) ITA	Aldo Cevenini	12	7	12	7
	FW	(Belgium) BEL	Louis Van Hege	16	19	16	19

== See also ==
- AC Milan

== Bibliography ==
- Almanacco illustrato del Milan, ed: 2, March 2005. Panini.
- Enrico Tosi. La storia del Milan, May 2005. Italia/Italy cid Tosi.
- Milan. Sempre con te, December 2009. Mondadori. 2009. ISBN 978-88-04-59118-4.
