= 1908–09 Milan FBCC season =

Italian football club season

Milan Foot-Ball and Cricket Club
1908–09 season
- President: Alfred Edwards, then Piero Pirelli
- Manager: Giannino Camperio
- Stadium: Campo Milan di Porta Monforte; Arena Civica
- Italian Football Championship: Qualifications
- Palla Dapples: Winner (2 times)
- Top goalscorer: League: Max Laich; Pietro Lana; Marco Sala; Attilio Trerè (1); All: Pietro Lana (4)
Home colours

During the 1908–09 season Milan Foot-Ball and Cricket Club competed in the Italian Football Championship and the Palla Dapples.

== Summary ==
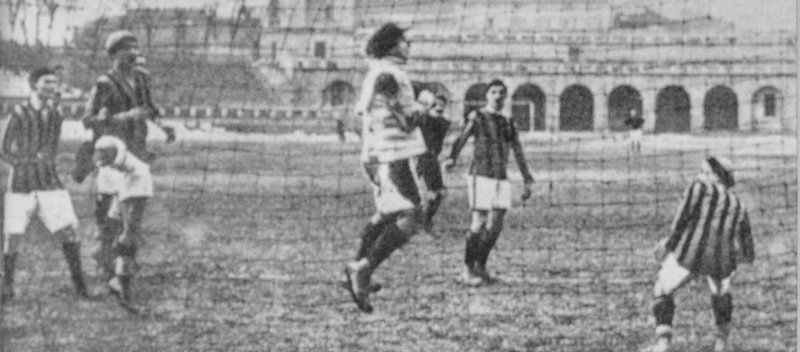
The first official game between Milan and Inter, played on the 10th of January 1909.

In the 1908–09 season, Milan returned to participate in the championship after forfeiting the previous year. The Italian Football Federation was in fact backtracking from its decision, allowing again football clubs to register foreign players.

Milan did not make it through the Lombard qualifying round and were eliminated by US Milanese thanks to a 3–1 defeat. On 10 January 1909, on the previous game of such qualifying round, the first official derby between Milan and Inter was played, at Campo Milan in Porta Monforte, which saw the Rossoneri win 3–2 thanks to the goals scored by Attilio Trerè, Pietro Lana and Max Laich. Two months earlier, on 18 October 1908, the first ever match between Milan and Inter had been played, valid for winning the Coppa Chiasso. The match, played in two halves of 25 minutes each, was won by Milan 2–1 with goals from Lana and Luigi Forlano, and allowed Milan to definitively conquer the trophy, having won it for the third consecutive edition after the successes of 1906 and 1907. this season registered also Milan's last two victories in the Palla Dapples.

Milan overcame their second corporate crisis with the election of a new president: Alfred Edwards, head of the club since its foundation, was replaced by Piero Pirelli.

== Squad ==
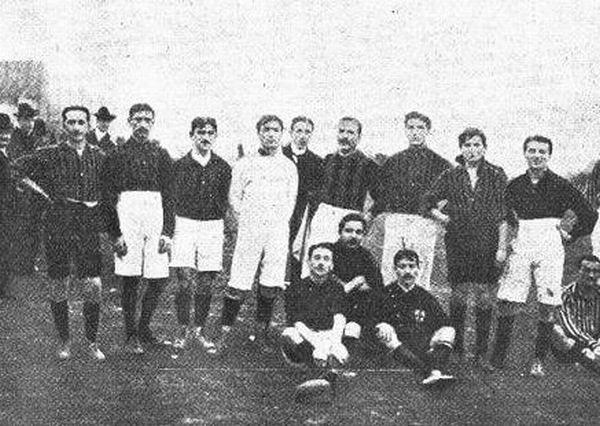
A Milan formation from the 1908-09 season.

Note: Flags indicate national team as defined under FIFA eligibility rules; some limited exceptions apply. Players may hold more than one non-FIFA nationality.

Pos.	Nation	Player
GK	ITA	Gerolamo Radice (Captain)
GK	ITA	Luigi Barbieri
DF	ITA	Andrea Meschia
DF	ITA	Attilio Colombo
DF	ITA	Carlo Bianchi
DF	ITA	Marco Sala
MF	ITA	Giulio Ermolli
MF	SUI	Max Laich

Pos.	Nation	Player
MF	ITA	Attilio Trerè
MF	ITA	Alessandro Scarioni
FW	ITA	Edoardo Mariani
FW	GER	Johann Ferdinand Mädler
FW	ITA	Luigi Forlano
FW	ITA	Vittorio Pedroni
FW	ITA	Pietro Lana

== Competitions ==
=== Italian Football Championship ===
==== Qualifications ====
10 January 1909 1	Milan	3–2	Inter	Milano
	Trerè II (?); Lana 74'; Laich 86'	Report	69' Gama; 88' Schuler	Stadium: Campo di Porta Monforte; Attendance: 150; Referee: Goodley

17 January 1909 2	US Milanese	3–1	Milan	Milano
	Recalcati (?); Bojocchi I (?); Pizzi I (?)		(?) Sala	Stadium: Campo di via Cascina Mojetta; Referee: Knoote

=== Palla Dapples ===
==== Final ====
1 November 1908 1	Milan	3–1	Genoa	Milano
	Lana 38' 88'; Forlano 70'	Report	85' Herzog	Stadium: Campo Milan di Porta Monforte; Referee: Radice

==== Final ====
8 November 1908 1	Milan	2–1	Juventus	Milano
	Lana; Trerè	Report	?	Stadium: Campo Milan di Porta Monforte; Referee: Rizzi

==== Final ====
15 November 1908 1	Milan	0–2	Pro Vercelli	Milano
		Report	32' Visconti; 50' Fresia	Stadium: Campo Milan di Porta Monforte; Referee: Goodley

==== Final ====
3 January 1909 1	Torino	5–0	Milan	Torino
	Kempher; Capra; Zuffi	Report		Stadium: Motovelodromo; Referee: Goodley

==== Final ====
28 March 1909 1	Torino	2–1	Milan	Torino
	Laich (o.g.); Zuffi	Report	Vivante	Stadium: Motovelodromo

==== Final ====
4 April 1909 1	Torino	2–0	Milan	Torino
		Report

== Statistics ==
=== Squad statistics ===
Competition	Points	Home						Away						Total						GD
Competition	Points	G	W	D	L	Gs	Ga	G	W	D	L	Gs	Ga	G	W	D	L	Gs	Ga	GD
1909 Italian Football Championship	–	1	1	0	0	3	2	1	0	0	1	1	3	2	1	0	1	4	5	−1
Palla Dapples	–	3	2	0	1	5	4	3	0	0	3	1	9	6	2	0	4	6	13	−7
Total	–	4	3	0	1	8	6	4	0	0	4	2	12	8	3	0	5	10	18	−8

=== Players statistics ===
No.	Pos	Nat	Player	Total		Italian Football Championship	
No.	Pos	Nat	Player	Apps	Goals	Apps	Goals
	GK	(Italy) ITA	Gerolamo Radice	2	-5	2	-5
	GK	(Italy) ITA	Luigi Barbieri	1	0	1	0
	DF	(Italy) ITA	Carlo Bianchi	1	0	1	0
	DF	(Italy) ITA	Marco Sala	2	1	2	1
	DF	(Italy) ITA	Attilio Colombo	2	0	2	0
	DF	(Italy) ITA	Andrea Meschia	1	0	1	0
	MF	(Italy) ITA	Giulio Ermolli	1	0	1	0
	MF	(Italy) ITA	Alessandro Scarioni	2	0	2	0
	MF	(Italy) ITA	Attilio Trerè	1	1	1	1
	MF	(Switzerland) SUI	Max Laich	2	1	2	1
	FW	(Italy) ITA	Luigi Forlano	1	0	1	0
	FW	(Germany) GER	Johann Ferdinand Mädler	1	0	1	0
	FW	(Italy) ITA	Pietro Lana	2	1	2	1
	FW	(Italy) ITA	Edoardo Mariani	2	0	2	0
	FW	(Italy) ITA	Vittorio Pedroni	1	0	1	0

== See also ==
- AC Milan

== Bibliography ==
- Almanacco illustrato del Milan, ed: 2, March 2005. Panini.
- Enrico Tosi. La storia del Milan, May 2005. Italia/Italy cid Tosi.
- Milan. Sempre con te, December 2009. Mondadori. 2009. ISBN 978-88-04-59118-4.
