= 1904–05 Milan FBCC season =

Italian football club season

Milan Foot-Ball and Cricket Club
1904–05 season
- President: Alfred Edwards
- Manager: Herbert Kilpin
- Stadium: Campo Acquabella
- Italian Football Championship: Qualifications
- Torneo FGNI: Winner
- Palla Dapples: Winner (3 times)
- Top goalscorer: League: Alessandro Trerè (3); All: Alessandro Trerè (3)
Home colours

During the 1904–05 season Milan Foot-Ball and Cricket Club competed in the Italian Football Championship, the FGNI Tournament and the Palla Dapples.

== Summary ==
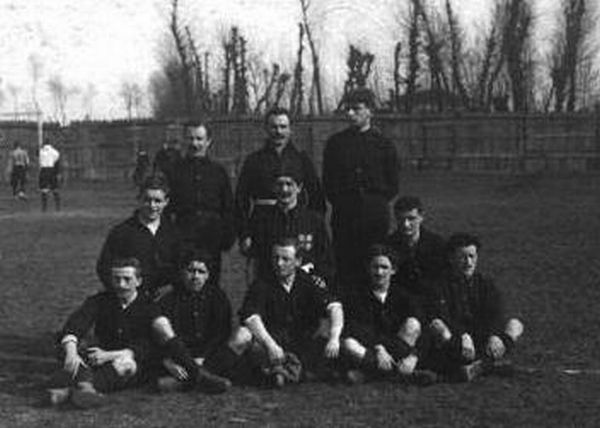
A Milan formation in the 1904–05 season.

In the Italian Championship, Milan was beaten in the qualifying round by US Milanese, a Milan team founded in 1902 and which remained active until 1928. Immediately eliminated from the championship, Milan concentrated on other federal trophies, winning the Palla Dapples three times and the FGNI tournament, cups of comparable importance to the championship at the time.

This season, Milan played football matches against foreign teams for the first time in their history. In April 1905, in fact, Milan faced a local team from Lugano, Switzerland, and St. Gallen, a Swiss football team founded in 1879.

== Squad ==
Note: Flags indicate national team as defined under FIFA eligibility rules; some limited exceptions apply. Players may hold more than one non-FIFA nationality.

Pos.	Nation	Player
GK	ITA	Giulio Ermolli
GK	URU	Attilio Firpi
DF	ITA	Guido Moda
DF	SUI	Hans Heinrich Suter
MF	ENG	Herbert Kilpin (Captain)
MF	ITA	Daniele Angeloni
MF	ITA	Luigi Bianchi
MF	ITA	Giulio Cederna

Pos.	Nation	Player
MF	ITA	Giuseppe Rizzi
MF	SUI	Paul Arnold Walty
FW	ITA	Antonio Sala
FW	ITA	Alessandro Trerè
FW	ITA	Umberto Scotti
FW	ITA	Gustavo Carrer
FW	ITA	Guido Pedroni
FW	ITA	Guerriero Colombo

=== Transfers ===
In
Pos.	Name	from	Type

Out
Pos.	Name	To	Type
MF	Alfred Haberlin		career end
MF	Paul Arnold Walty	Juventus	
FW	Enrico Canfari		career end
FW	Umberto Scotti		career end

== Competitions ==
=== Prima Categoria ===
==== Qualifications ====
12 February 1905 1	Milan	3–3	US Milanese	Milano
	Carrer; Trerè	Report	Recalcati	Stadium: Campo Acquabella; Referee: Pasteur

19 February 1905 2	US Milanese	7–6	Milan	Milano
	Varisco; Franziosi ?	Report	Rizzi; Trerè ?	Stadium: Campo di Via Comasina; Referee: Malvano

=== Torneo FGNI ===
==== Final ====
25 June 1905 Final	Milan	1–0 (a.e.t.)	Ceserano Padova	Venezia
	?	Report		Referee: Bosisio

=== Palla Dapples ===
==== Final ====
9 April 1905 1	Andrea Doria	0–1	Milan	Genova
		Report	?	Stadium: Campo Sportivo di Ponte Carrega; Referee: Spensley

==== Final ====
16 April 1905 Finale	Milan	4–0	Andrea Doria	Milano
	?	Report		Stadium: Campo Acquabella; Referee: Spensley

==== Final ====
30 April 1905 Finale	Milan	2–0	Genoa	Milano
	?	Report		Stadium: Campo Acquabella; Referee: Bosisio

== Statistics ==
=== Squad statistics ===
Competition	Points	Home						Away						Total						GD
Competition	Points	G	W	D	L	Gs	Ga	G	W	D	L	Gs	Ga	G	W	D	L	Gs	Ga	GD
1905 Prima Categoria	–	1	0	1	0	3	3	1	0	0	1	6	7	2	0	1	1	9	10	−1
Torneo FGNI	–	1	1	0	0	1	0	0	0	0	0	0	0	1	1	0	0	1	0	+1
Palla Dapples	–	2	2	0	0	6	0	1	1	0	0	1	0	3	3	0	0	7	0	+7
Total	–	4	3	1	0	10	3	2	1	0	1	7	7	6	4	1	1	17	10	+7

=== Players statistics ===
No.	Pos	Nat	Player	Total		Prima Categoria	
No.	Pos	Nat	Player	Apps	Goals	Apps	Goals
	GK	(Italy) ITA	Giulio Ermolli	2	0	2	0
	GK	(Italy) ITA	Attilio Firpi	1	-7	1	-7
	DF	(Switzerland) SUI	Guido Moda	0	0	0	0
	DF	(Switzerland) SUI	Hans Heinrich Suter	2	0	2	0
	MF	(Italy) ITA	Daniele Angeloni	2	0	2	0
	MF	(England) ENG	Herbert Kilpin	2	0	2	0
	MF	(Italy) ITA	Giulio Cederna	1	-3	1	-3
	MF	(Italy) ITA	Giuseppe Rizzi	2	1	2	1
	FW	(Switzerland) SUI	Luigi Bianchi	2	0	2	0
	FW	(Italy) ITA	Gustavo Carrer	2	2	2	2
	FW	(Italy) ITA	Guerriero Colombo	2	0	2	0
	FW	(Italy) ITA	Alessandro Trerè	2	3	2	3
	FW	(Italy) ITA	Antonio Sala	0	0	0	0
	FW	(Italy) ITA	Guido Pedroni	2	0	2	0

== See also ==
- AC Milan

== Bibliography ==
- Almanacco illustrato del Milan, ed: 2, March 2005. Panini.
- Enrico Tosi. La storia del Milan, May 2005. Italia/Italy cid Tosi.
- Milan. Sempre con te, December 2009. Mondadori. 2009. ISBN 978-88-04-59118-4.
