= 1909–10 Milan FBCC season =

Italian football club season

Milan Foot-Ball and Cricket Club
1909–10 season
- President: Piero Pirelli
- Manager: Giannino Camperio
- Stadium: Campo Milan di Porta Monforte; Arena Civica
- Italian Football Championship: 6th
- Top goalscorer: League: Achille Brioschi (5); All: Achille Brioschi (5)
Home colours

During the 1909–10 season Milan Foot-Ball and Cricket Club competed in the Italian Football Championship.

== Summary ==
This season the organization of the championship changed. Only one group was set up, in which the nine contenders for the title of Italian champion faced each other.

For Milan, this was a mediocre campaign, with a disappointing sixth place. The club suffered above all for a long series of injuries, which, towards the end of the tournament, also led to the demoralization of the players, an attitude which was a contributing cause of the terrible results on the pitch. Worthy of note are the debuts of Aldo Cevenini and Renzo De Vecchi, who were launched into the Italian football scene.

This season saw the first change of corporate headquarters: from the Fiaschetteria Toscana in via Berchet 1, Milan, the Milan's first headquarters, the club moved to the Birreria Spatenbräu in via Foscolo 2, Milan.

== Squad ==
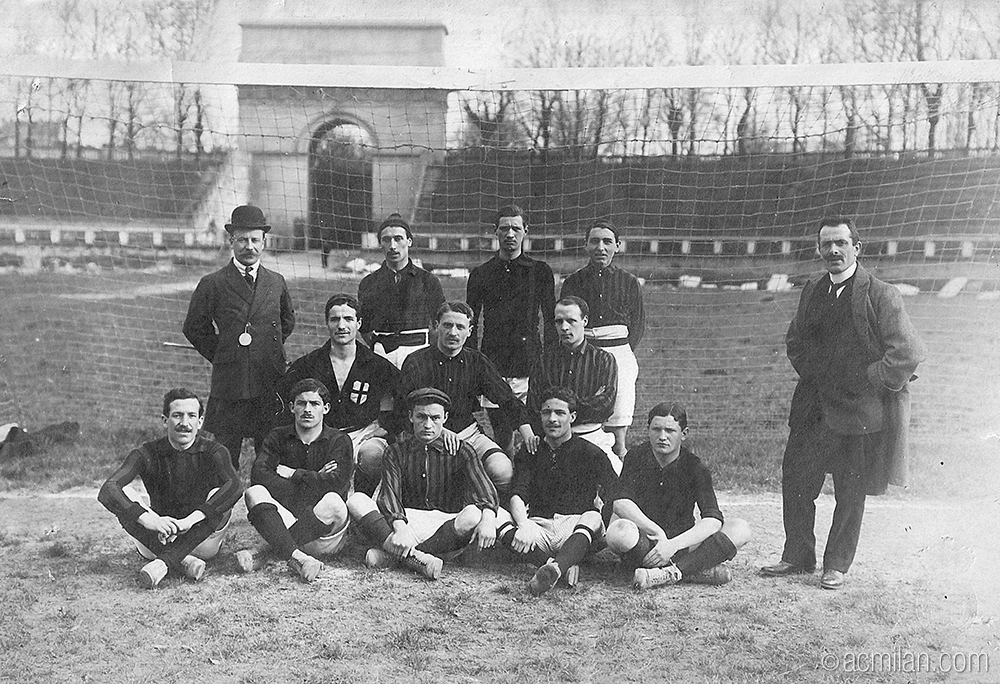
A Milan formation in the 1909–10 season.

Note: Flags indicate national team as defined under FIFA eligibility rules; some limited exceptions apply. Players may hold more than one non-FIFA nationality.

Pos.	Nation	Player
GK	ITA	Lorenzo Gaslini
GK	ITA	Luigi Barbieri
GK	SUI	Heinric Heim
GK	ENG	Thomas Mac Cormack
DF	ITA	Renzo De Vecchi
DF	ITA	Attilio Colombo
DF	ITA	Guido Moda (Captain)
DF	ITA	Marco Sala
MF	ITA	Giulio Ermolli
MF	ITA	Alfred Bosshard
MF	SCO	Jack Diment
MF	SUI	Otto Mayer

Pos.	Nation	Player
MF	SUI	Edi Ott
MF	ITA	Pietro Pozzi
MF	ITA	Alessandro Scarioni
FW	ITA	Pietro Pozzi
FW	ITA	Edoardo Mariani
FW	ITA	Achille Brioschi
FW	ITA	Luigi Forlano
FW	ITA	Vittorio Pedroni
FW	ITA	Pietro Lana
FW	ITA	Gustavo Carrer
FW	ITA	Aldo Cevenini
FW	SUI	Albert Hunzicker

== Competitions ==
=== Italian Football Championship ===
14 November 1909 1	Milan	2–1	Ausonia	Milano
	Lana 27' (pen.), 43'	Report	15' Bontadini	Stadium: Campo Milan di Porta Monforte; Referee: Recalcati

21 November 1909 2	US Milanese	2–1	Milan	Milano
	Sardi 20'; Cevenini I og'	Report	15' Brioschi	Stadium: Arena Civica; Referee: G.Gama

28 November 1909 3	Torino	6–2	Milan	Torino
	Lang 10', 53', 55', 78'; Zuffi I 84'	Report	3' De Vecchi; 64' Barbieri	Stadium: Velodromo Umberto I Referee: Malvano

17 April 1910 4	Andrea Doria	1–7	Milan	Genova
	Ansaldo ?' (pen.)	Report	?' ?' Brioschi ?' ?' Carrer ?' Cevenini I ?' marcatore sconosciuto ?' marcatore sconosciuto	Stadium: Marassi; Referee: G.Gama

12 December 1909 5	Milan	1–0	US Milanese	Milano
	Mariani 41'	Report		Stadium: Campo Milan di Porta Monforte; Referee: Goodley

19 December 1909 6	Genoa	0–1	Milan	Genova
		Report	52' Mariani	Stadium: Campo di San Gottardo; Referee: Meazza

2 January 1910 7	Milan	0–3	Pro Vercelli	Milano
		Report	4' Corna I 63', 86' Rampini I	Stadium: Campo Milan di Porta Monforte; Referee: G.Gama

24 April 1910 8	Milan	2–0	Andrea Doria	Milano
		Report		Stadium: Campo Milan di Porta Monforte

16 January 1910 9	Juventus	5–3	Milan	Torino
	Borel I 10' (pen.); Moschino 30', 67'; Barberis 61'	Report	13' (pen.) Lana; 25' De Vecchi; 42' Mayer	Stadium: Stadio di Corso Sebastopoli; Referee: Bertinetti

23 January 1910 10	Milan	0–1	Juventus	Milano
		Report	?' Moschino	Stadium: Campo Milan di Porta Monforte; Referee: Meazza

30 January 1910 11	Ausonia	2–2	Milan	Milano
	Scotuzzi 1'; Bontadini III ?'	Report	3' Brioschi; 30' Carrer	Stadium: Campo Milan di Porta Monforte; Referee: G.Gama

6 February 1910 12	Milan	0–5	Inter	Milano
		Report	?' ?' ?' Capra ?' Peterly II ?' Payer	Stadium: Campo Milan di Porta Monforte; Referee: Goodley

13 February 1910 13	Milan	1–0	Genoa	Milano
	Brioschi 32'	Report		Stadium: Campo Milan di Porta Monforte; Referee: G.Gama

20 February 1910 14	Pro Vercelli	4–0	Milan	Vercelli
	Rampini I 15', 58', 81'; Milano II 30'	Report		Stadium: Foro Boario; Referee: Hess

27 February 1910 15	Inter	5–1	Milan	Milano
	Peterly II 55', 85'; Engler 62', 71'; Capra 68'	Report	5' Mariani	Stadium: Arena Civica; Referee: Recalcati

6 March 1910 16	Milan	0–1	Torino	Milano
		Report	?' (o.g.) De Vecchi	Stadium: Campo Milan di Porta Monforte; Referee: G.Gama

== Statistics ==
=== Squad statistics ===
Competition	Points	Home						Away						Total						GD
Competition	Points	G	W	D	L	Gs	Ga	G	W	D	L	Gs	Ga	G	W	D	L	Gs	Ga	GD
1909–10 Prima Categoria	13	8	4	0	4	6	11	8	2	1	5	17	25	16	6	1	9	23	36	−13

=== Players statistics ===
No.	Pos	Nat	Player	Total		Italian Football Championship	
No.	Pos	Nat	Player	Apps	Goals	Apps	Goals
	GK	(Italy) ITA	Lorenzo Gaslini	3	-7	3	-7
	GK	(Italy) ITA	Luigi Barbieri	12	-6	12	-7+1
	GK	(Switzerland) SUI	Heinric Heim	4	-8	4	-8
	GK	(England) ENG	Thomas Mac Cormack	1	0	1	0
	DF	(Italy) ITA	Guido Moda	10	0	10	0
	DF	(Italy) ITA	Marco Sala	9	0	9	0
	DF	(Italy) ITA	Attilio Colombo	12	-3	12	-3+0
	DF	(Italy) ITA	Renzo De Vecchi	15	3	15	3
	MF	(Italy) ITA	Giulio Ermolli	1	0	1	0
	MF	(Italy) ITA	Alessandro Scarioni	13	0	13	0
	MF	(Switzerland) SUI	Alfred Bosshard	3	0	3	0
	MF	(Switzerland) SUI	Otto Mayer	13	1	13	1
	MF	(Switzerland) SUI	Edi Ott	3	-7	3	-7+0
	MF	(Scotland) SCO	Jack Diment	5	0	5	0
	FW	(Italy) ITA	Pietro Pozzi	1	0	1	0
	FW	(Italy) ITA	Achille Brioschi	10	5	10	5
	FW	(Italy) ITA	Gustavo Carrer	13	3	13	3
	FW	(Italy) ITA	Pietro Lana	8	3	8	3
	FW	(Italy) ITA	Edoardo Mariani	12	3	12	3
	FW	(Italy) ITA	Vittorio Pedroni	3	0	3	0
	FW	(Italy) ITA	Aldo Cevenini	13	-3	13	-4+1
	FW	(Switzerland) SUI	Albert Hunzicker	1	0	1	0
	FW	(Italy) ITA	Edoardo Mariani	12	3	12	3

== See also ==
- AC Milan

== Bibliography ==
- Almanacco illustrato del Milan, ed: 2, March 2005. Panini.
- Enrico Tosi. La storia del Milan, May 2005. Italia/Italy cid Tosi.
- Milan. Sempre con te, December 2009. Mondadori. 2009. ISBN 978-88-04-59118-4.
