= 1903–04 Milan FBCC season =

Italian football club season

Milan Foot-Ball and Cricket Club
1903–04 season
- President: Alfred Edwards
- Manager: Herbert Kilpin
- Stadium: Campo Acquabella
- Italian Football Championship: Semifinal
- Torneo FGNI: Winner
- Palla Dapples: Runner-up
- Top goalscorer: League: Herbert Kilpin; Umberto Scotti (1); All: Herbert Kilpin; Umberto Scotti; Guido Pedroni; Alessandro Trerè; Hans Heinrich Suter (1)
Home colours

During the 1903–04 season Milan Foot-Ball and Cricket Club competed in the Italian Football Championship, the FGNI Tournament and the Palla Dapples.

== Summary ==
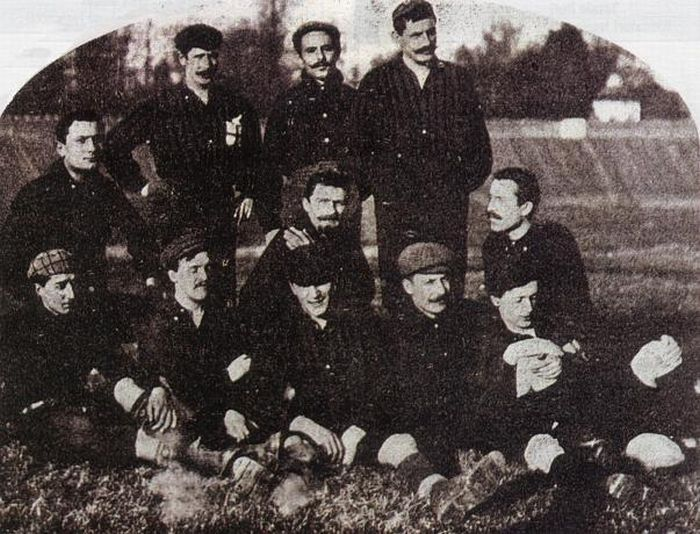
A Milan formation in the 1903–04 season.

In the 1903–04 season, the club, after having passed the qualifying round by beating Andrea Doria, lost the Italian Championship semifinal against Juventus. The first game ended 1–1 after the extra time, requiring a play-off to be played. This game was won 3–0 by the Turin club. Milan participated in various cups organized by the federation, including the "Italian Gymnastics Federation Cup", also known as FGNI tournament, which they won in Florence beating Andrea Doria by 3–2. This was the first game played by Milan outside the regions of Northern Italy.

== Squad ==
Note: Flags indicate national team as defined under FIFA eligibility rules; some limited exceptions apply. Players may hold more than one non-FIFA nationality.

Pos.	Nation	Player
GK	ITA	Giulio Ermolli
GK	ITA	Gerolamo Radice
DF	ITA	Guido Moda
DF	SUI	Hans Heinrich Suter
MF	ENG	Herbert Kilpin (Captain)
MF	ITA	Daniele Angeloni
MF	SUI	Alfred Haberlin
MF	ITA	Giulio Cederna

Pos.	Nation	Player
MF	ITA	Giuseppe Rizzi
MF	SUI	Paul Arnold Walty
FW	ITA	Antonio Sala
FW	ITA	Enrico Canfari
FW	ITA	Umberto Scotti
FW	ITA	Guido Pedroni
FW	ITA	Guerriero Colombo

=== Transfers ===
In
Pos.	Name	from	Type
FW	Enrico Canfari	Juventus	

Out
Pos.	Name	To	Type
MF	Giannino Camperio		career end
FW	Domenico Galli		career end
FW	Guido Gregoletto		career end

== Competitions ==
=== Prima Categoria ===
==== Qualifications ====
6 March 1904 1	Milan	1–0	Andrea Doria	Milano
	Kilpin 75'	Report		Stadium: Campo Acquabella; Referee: Spensley

==== Semifinal ====
13 March 1904 1	Milan	1–1 (a.e.t.)	Juventus	Milano
	Scotti	Report	Streule	Stadium: Campo Acquabella; Referee: Bosisio

20 March 1904 Play-off	Milan	0–3	Juventus	Milano
			Streule; Ferraris I Gibezzi	Stadium: Campo Acquabella; Referee: Dobbie

=== Torneo FGNI ===
==== Qualifications ====
22 May 1904 1	Milan	2–0	Mediolanum	Milano
		Report		Stadium: Campo Acquabella

22 May 1904 2	Milan	2–1	Sempione	Milano
	Pedroni; Trerè	Report	?	Stadium: Campo Acquabella; Referee: Bosisio

==== Final ====
3 June 1904 Finale	Milan	3–2	Andrea Doria	Firenze
	?	Report	?	Referee: Bosisio

=== Palla Dapples ===
==== Final ====
17 January 1904 Finale	Genoa	2–1	Milan	Genova
	?	Report	Suter	Stadium: Campo Sportivo di Ponte Carrega; Referee: Calì

== Statistics ==
=== Squad statistics ===
Competition	Points	Home						Away						Total						GD
Competition	Points	G	W	D	L	Gs	Ga	G	W	D	L	Gs	Ga	G	W	D	L	Gs	Ga	GD
1904 Prima Categoria	–	3	1	1	1	2	4	0	0	0	0	0	0	3	1	1	1	2	4	−2
Torneo FGNI	–	3	3	0	0	7	3	0	0	0	0	0	0	3	3	0	0	7	3	+4
Palla Dapples	–	0	0	0	0	0	0	1	0	0	1	1	2	1	0	0	1	1	2	−1
Total	–	6	4	1	1	9	7	1	0	0	1	1	2	7	4	1	2	10	9	+1

=== Players statistics ===
No.	Pos	Nat	Player	Total		Prima Categoria	
No.	Pos	Nat	Player	Apps	Goals	Apps	Goals
	GK	(Italy) ITA	Giulio Ermolli	3	-4	3	-4
	GK	(Italy) ITA	Gerolamo Radice	0	0	0	0
	DF	(Switzerland) SUI	Guido Moda	1	0	1	0
	DF	(Switzerland) SUI	Hans Heinrich Suter	2	0	2	0
	MF	(Italy) ITA	Daniele Angeloni	3	0	3	0
	MF	(England) ENG	Herbert Kilpin	3	1	3	1
	MF	(Italy) ITA	Alfred Haberlin	3	0	3	0
	MF	(Italy) ITA	Giulio Cederna	2	0	2	0
	MF	(Italy) ITA	Giuseppe Rizzi	0	0	0	0
	MF	(Switzerland) SUI	Paul Arnold Walty	3	0	3	0
	FW	(Italy) ITA	Umberto Scotti	3	1	3	1
	FW	(Italy) ITA	Guerriero Colombo	3	0	3	0
	FW	(Italy) ITA	Enrico Canfari	3	0	3	0
	FW	(Italy) ITA	Antonio Sala	1	0	1	0
	FW	(Italy) ITA	Guido Pedroni	3	0	3	0

== See also ==
- AC Milan

== Bibliography ==
- Almanacco illustrato del Milan, ed: 2, March 2005. Panini.
- Enrico Tosi. La storia del Milan, May 2005. Italia/Italy cid Tosi.
- Milan. Sempre con te, December 2009. Mondadori. 2009. ISBN 978-88-04-59118-4.
