= 1905–06 Milan FBCC season =

Italian football club season

Milan Foot-Ball and Cricket Club
1905–06 season
- President: Alfred Edwards
- Manager: Herbert Kilpin
- Stadium: Campo Milan di Porta Monforte
- Italian Football Championship: Winner
- Torneo FGNI: Winner
- Palla Dapples: Winner (3 times)
- Top goalscorer: League: Guido Pedroni (3); All: Guido Pedroni (4)
Home colours

During the 1905–06 season Milan Foot-Ball and Cricket Club competed in the Italian Football Championship, the FGNI Tournament and the Palla Dapples.

== Summary ==
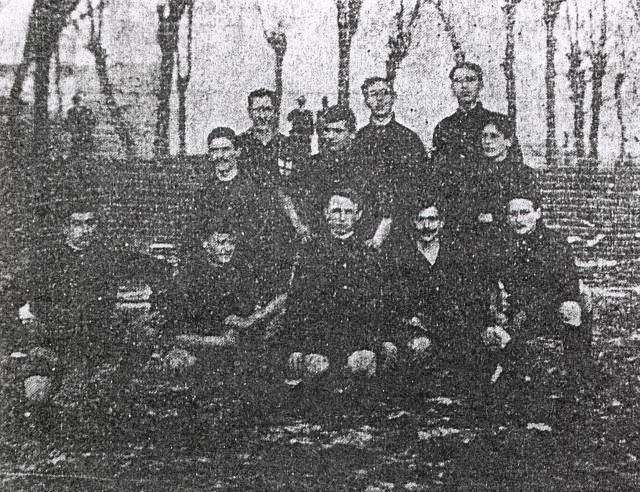
A Milan formation in the 1905–06 season.

The 1905–06 season began with a change of playing field, as the club moved from the Campo Acquabella to the Campo Milan in Porta Monforte. Furthermore, the presence of English players is reduced in favor of Italian athletes: the only British player left was founder Herbert Kilpin. Next to this, the activity of the cricket section ceased its operations, but despite this, the historical name of Milan Foot-Ball and Cricket Club was preserved.

This season, Milan won the second Italian Championship in their history, to which were added the three victories in the Palla Dapples and once again in the FGNI Tournament, two tournaments of comparable importance to that of the championship. Added to these triumphs was also the victory of the reserve team in the Seconda Categoria championship (an equivalent of the second division at the time).

The season in the Italian Championship showcased the first instance of the rivalry between Milan and Juventus. The two clubs faced each other two times in the final round of the competition, sharing the stage with one win each (2–1 for Juventus in Turin and 1–0 for Milan at home). They ended the final standings on equal points, five each, thus requiring a tie-breaker to determine the winner of the competition. The first game, played in Turin, ended with a goalless draw after the extra time. The Federation decided that the repetition of the play-off would be played on a neutral pitch rather than at the Velodrome Humbert I in Turin, because Juventus had already benefited from the right to play the previous match at home, and the dispute of two consecutive home games was not allowed. The choice fell on the US Milanese pitch in via Comasina 6, in Milan. This triggered the protests of Juventus management, that formally stated that this decision violated the concept of neutrality of the pitch, bringing as arguments the facts that this required a longer trip for the Turin players, and that Milan would have received a stronger support from the Milanese crowd. These arguments were ignored by the Federation, which decided to keep the location of the game as defined. Juventus forfeited the game, thus giving the victory to Milan by 2–0, with the latter winning the title.

== Squad ==
Note: Flags indicate national team as defined under FIFA eligibility rules; some limited exceptions apply. Players may hold more than one non-FIFA nationality.

Pos.	Nation	Player
GK	NED	François Menno Knoote
GK	ITA	Gerolamo Radice
GK	ITA	Attilio Trerè
DF	ITA	Guido Moda
DF	ITA	Andrea Meschia
DF	ITA	Attilio Colombo
MF	ENG	Herbert Kilpin (Captain)
MF	SUI	Alfred Bosshard
MF	GER	Hans Mayer Heuberger

Pos.	Nation	Player
MF	ITA	Giuseppe Rizzi
MF	SUI	Oscar Joseph Giger
FW	ITA	Antonio Sala
FW	ITA	Alessandro Trerè
FW	ITA	Umberto Malvano
FW	ITA	Guido Pedroni
FW	ITA	Guerriero Colombo
FW	SUI	Ernst Widmer

=== Transfers ===
In
Pos.	Name	from	Type
GK	François Menno Knoote		
GK	Attilio Trerè	Sempione	
MF	Alfred Bosshard	FC St. Gallen	
MF	Oscar Joseph Giger	FC St. Gallen	
FW	Umberto Malvano		
FW	Ernst Widmer	FC St. Gallen	

Out
Pos.	Name	To	Type
GK	Giulio Cederna		career end
GK	Attilio Firpi		career end
DF	Hans Heinrich Suter		career end
MF	Daniele Angeloni		career end
MF	Luigi Bianchi		career end

== Competitions ==
=== Prima Categoria ===
==== Qualifications ====
7 January 1906 1	Milan	4–3	US Milanese	Milan
	Pedroni; Giger; Malvano; Widmer 90'	Report	Boiocchi; Franziosi; Varisco	Stadium: Campo Milan di Porta Monforte; Referee: Bosisio

14 January 1906 2	US Milanese	1–2	Milan	Milan
	Cremonesi	Report	15' Widmer; Rizzi	Stadium: Campo di Via Comasina; Referee: Suter

==== Final round ====
4 March 1906 1	Genoa	2–2	Milan	Genova
	Bugnion 80' 88' (pen.)	Report	Pedroni	Stadium: Campo Sportivo di Ponte Carrega; Referee: Calì

11 March 1906 2	Juventus	2–1	Milan	Torino
	Donna 55'; Armano 65'	Report	42' Trerè II	Stadium: Velodromo Umberto I Referee: Meazza

8 April 1906 3	Milan	2–0	Genoa	Milan
		Report		Stadium: Campo Milan di Porta Monforte; Referee: Meazza

22 April 1906 4	Milan	1–0	Juventus	Milan
	Rizzi 30'	Report		Stadium: Campo Acquabella; Referee: Calì

==== Tie-breaker ====
29 April 1906 1	Juventus	0–0 (a.e.t.)	Milan	Torino
		Report		Stadium: Velodromo Umberto I Referee: Suter

6 May 1906 Repetition	Milan	2–0	Juventus	Milan
		Report		Stadium: Campo di Via Comasina; Referee: Suter

=== Torneo FGNI ===
==== Final ====
9 September 1906 1	Milan	5–0	Vicenza	Vicenza
	?	Report		Referee: Bosisio

=== Palla Dapples ===
==== Final ====
12 November 1905 1	Milan	2–0	Juventus	Milano
	?	Report		Stadium: Campo Acquabella; Referee: Bosisio

==== Final ====
26 November 1905 1	Milan	6–0	US Milanese	Milano
	Widmer 9'; Pedroni 20' ?	Report		Stadium: Campo Acquabella; Referee: Suter

==== Final ====
10 December 1905 1	Milan	3–2	Juventus	Milano
	?	Report	Bollinger; Donna	Stadium: Campo Acquabella; Referee: Recalcati

== Statistics ==
=== Squad statistics ===
Competition	Points	Home						Away						Total						GD
Competition	Points	G	W	D	L	Gs	Ga	G	W	D	L	Gs	Ga	G	W	D	L	Gs	Ga	GD
1906 Prima Categoria	5	4	4	0	0	9	3	4	1	2	1	5	5	8	5	2	1	14	8	+6
Torneo FGNI	–	1	1	0	0	5	0	0	0	0	0	0	0	1	1	0	0	5	0	+5
Palla Dapples	–	3	3	0	0	11	2	0	0	0	0	0	0	3	3	0	0	11	2	+9
Total	5	8	8	0	0	25	5	4	1	2	1	5	5	12	9	2	1	30	10	+20

=== Players statistics ===
No.	Pos	Nat	Player	Total		Prima Categoria	
No.	Pos	Nat	Player	Apps	Goals	Apps	Goals
	GK	(Netherlands) NED	François Menno Knoote	2	-2	2	-2
	GK	(Italy) ITA	Attilio Trerè	6	-5	6	-6+1
	GK	(Italy) ITA	Gerolamo Radice	0	0	0	0
	DF	(Italy) ITA	Guido Moda	4	0	4	0
	DF	(Italy) ITA	Attilio Colombo	3	0	3	0
	DF	(Italy) ITA	Andrea Meschia	2	0	2	0
	MF	(Switzerland) SUI	Alfred Bosshard	6	0	6	0
	MF	(England) ENG	Herbert Kilpin	6	0	6	0
	MF	(Italy) ITA	Giuseppe Camperio	0	0	0	0
	MF	(Italy) ITA	Giuseppe Rizzi	5	2	5	2
	MF	(Italy) ITA	Giulio Ermolli	0	0	0	0
	MF	(Switzerland) SUI	Oscar Joseph Giger	6	1	6	1
	MF	(Germany) GER	Hans Mayer Heuberger	6	0	6	0
	FW	(Italy) ITA	Umberto Malvano	4	1	4	1
	FW	(Switzerland) SUI	Ernst Widmer	5	2	5	2
	FW	(Italy) ITA	Guerriero Colombo	1	0	1	0
	FW	(Italy) ITA	Alessandro Trerè	3	0	3	0
	FW	(Italy) ITA	Antonio Sala	1	0	1	0
	FW	(Italy) ITA	Guido Pedroni	6	3	6	3

== See also ==
- AC Milan

== Bibliography ==
- Almanacco illustrato del Milan, ed: 2, March 2005. Panini.
- Enrico Tosi. La storia del Milan, May 2005. Italia/Italy cid Tosi.
- Milan. Sempre con te, December 2009. Mondadori. 2009. ISBN 978-88-04-59118-4.
