= Derby della Mole =

Turin derby between Juventus and Torino

- Other names: Turin Derby, Derby di Torino
- Location: Turin, Italy
- Teams: Juventus; Torino
- First meeting: 13 January 1907; Italian Football Championship; Torino 2–1 Juventus
- Latest meeting: 24 May 2026; Serie A Torino 2–2 Juventus
- Stadiums: Juventus Stadium (Juventus); Stadio Olimpico Grande Torino (Torino)

Statistics
- Total meetings: Official matches: 214; Unofficial matches: 41; Total matches: 255
- Most wins: Official matches: Juventus (96); Unofficial matches: Torino (17); Total matches: Juventus (112)
- Top scorer: Giampiero Boniperti (14)
- Largest victory: Juventus 0–8 Torino; Italian Football Championship (17 November 1912)

The Derby della Mole is the local derby played out between Turin's most prominent football clubs, Juventus and Torino. It is also known as the Derby di Torino or the Turin Derby in English. It is named after the Mole Antonelliana, a major landmark in the city and the architectural symbol of the Piedmontese capital. It is the oldest ongoing meeting between two teams based in the same city in Italian football.

The match between the two clubs represented until the First World War the juxtaposition of two opposing social classes. Juventus, founded in 1897 by students of a prestigious high school in Turin, soon became akin to the bourgeois in the town especially after enduring bond with the Agnelli family, which began in 1923, during which time they were also supported by the aristocracy of the region. Torino instead was born in 1906 from a division within Juventus, at the hands of dissidents who joined forces with another team from the city, Football Club Torinese, who identified with the then-early industrial world. In the 1960s and 1970s, these differences had eased considerably, partly as a result of the great migration to Turin about forty years earlier, but did not disappear: Juventus has since transcended its status as the symbol of the bourgeois and elite class to become a global phenomenon while Torino still largely retains an exclusively local fanbase.

The colours of the two teams also contribute, in small part, to this distinction: the Bianconeri, originally pink and black, adopted their jerseys from Notts County all the way from England, while the Granata dusted off the colours of the "Brigade Savoia", that two centuries earlier had liberated the then capital of the Duchy of Savoy. Both clubs, however, featured within their emblems a raging bull, taken from the city's coat of arms: Juventus as a bond with their origins, while Torino adopted it as their identity. It was the case until 2017 when Juventus introduced a J-shaped logo and featured the bull no longer.

== History ==
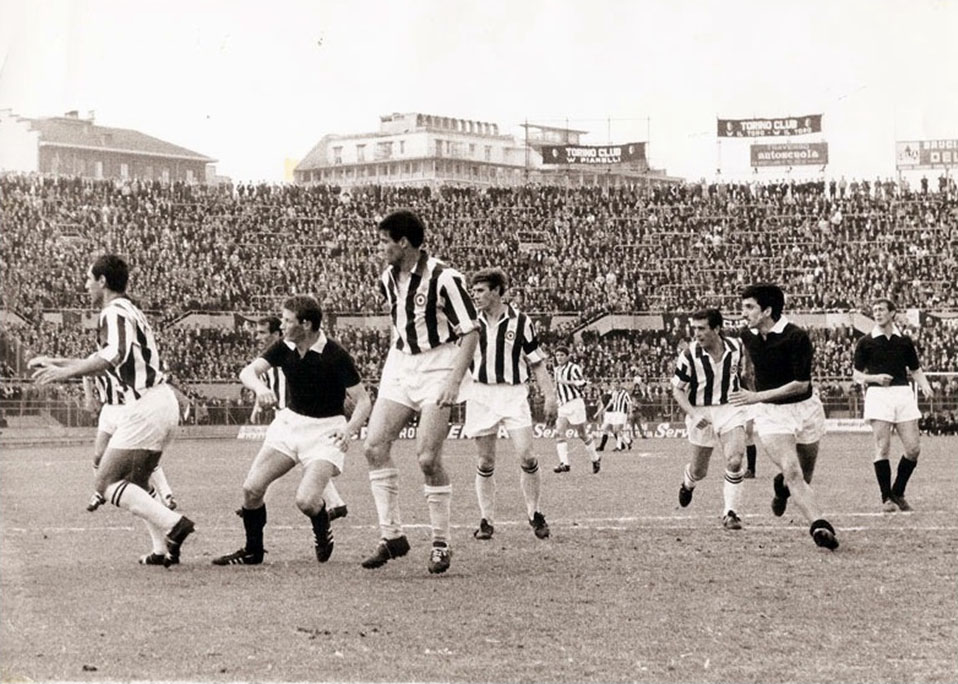
A vintage derby; 1965–66

The Turin derby was first played on 13 January 1907. It was also the first competitive match of Torino after its founding on 3 December 1906. The rivalry stems from the fact that Torino was founded through a merger of Football Club Torinese and a group of Juventus dissidents, led by major financier Alfred Dick. It is said that prior to the first derby, Dick was locked inside the changing room, causing him to miss the game and having to listen to updates via players and staff.

Since then, the derby has not been played in Serie A thirteen times: twelve due to Torino being in Serie B, and once after Juventus were relegated following the 2006 Italian football scandal. In addition to the derby against the Granata, the Bianconeri have played many derbies in the top flight with other city teams that no longer exist such as R.S. Ginnastica Torino, Sport Club Audace Torino and Football Club Pastore. In the first two editions of the Italian football championship, the original derbies of Turin were the ones played between Torinese, Ginnastica Torino and Internazionale Torino, before the latter merged with Torinese in 1900.

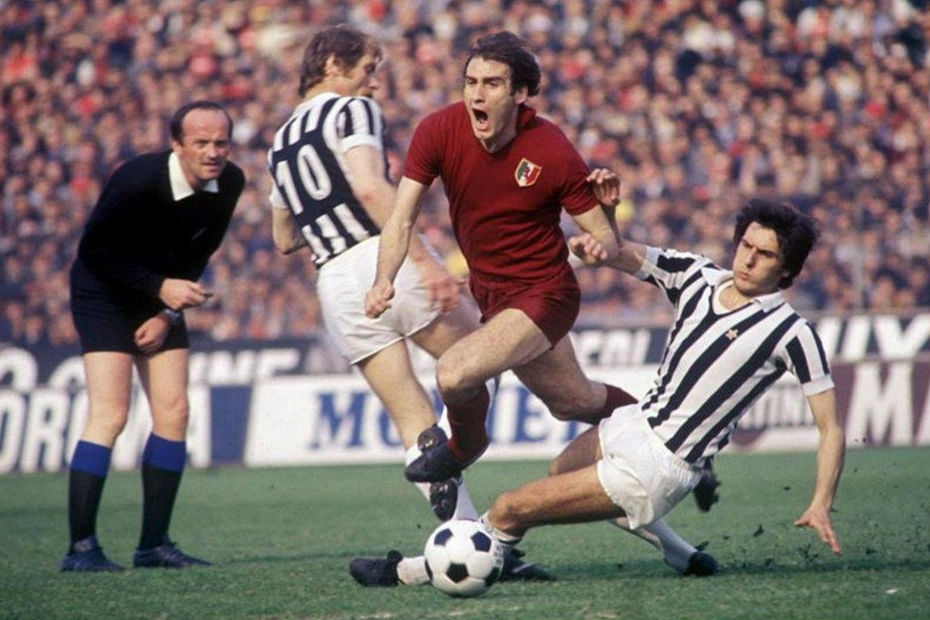
Graziani tackled by Scirea and Benetti during a derby for the Scudetto in 1976–77

Before World War II, the rivalry between the two clubs came to represent a class divide in the Piedmont region. The fans of Torino originally represented the proletariat, while Juventus the bourgeoisie. However, with the mass migration to Turin, a major industrial center of northern Italy, in the 1960s and 1970s, the social difference had already diminished considerably. Many blue-collar workers arrived from southern Italy and took up employment with the Agnelli family, the owners of FIAT; thus, they started to see Juventus as "the team of the boss" or the "team of Fiat", and became fans. Torino would stand to represent the "original" spirit of Piedmont, or the purest Torinesità and to this day, it draws its supporters from a predominantly local fanbase, compared to Juventus, which enjoys widespread support even outside of Italy. Today, the differences remain, even if they are less prominent, due to Torino regularly teetering between Serie A and Serie B since the second half of the 1990s.

As of 28 February 2023, Juventus have won the derby 110 times and Torino have won it 73 times. Despite the overall results of the derby generally in favor of Juventus, historically, there have been periods where Torino have prevailed; between 1912 and 1914, in the space of three encounters, Torino submerged Juventus under a heavy "coat" of 23 goals—in which Juventus suffered its heaviest defeat in history, an 0–8 result on 17 November 1912, and especially during the 1940s, thanks to the team led by Valentino Mazzola, known as the Grande Torino. The end of the twenties signaled a period of early dominance of Juventus, who had just passed under the Agnelli, and left their rivals with only three victories in twenty matches; subsequently, the Superga tragedy of 1949 and the consequent technical impoverishment of Torino, was followed by a period more favourable for Juventus in the 1950s, culminating in the derby of 20 April 1952, won 6–0.

The 1970s witnessed the revival of Torino, when Juventus remained without a win in the derby for nearly six years (from December 1973 to March 1979) and Torino established a record of 4 wins in a row in a single championship (1975–76). Coinciding with Torino's economic difficulties (especially at the end of the 1990s), Juventus inflicted heavy defeats (5–0 of 3 December 1995). Recent history has seen a marked dominance of Juventus, so much so that Torino's 2–1 victory on 26 April 2015 was their first derby success in twenty years.

== Official match results ==
- 3P = Third place play-off
- SF = Semi-finals
- QF = Quarter-finals
- R16 = Round of 16
- R32 = Round of 32
- GS = Group stage
- R1 = Round 1
- R2 = Round 2

Juventus win Draw Torino win

Season	Competition	Date	Home team	Result	Away team
1907	Prima Categoria	13 January 1907	Torino	2–1	Juventus
1907	Prima Categoria	13 February 1907	Juventus	1–4	Torino
1909	Prima Categoria	10 January 1909	Torino	1–0	Juventus
1909	Prima Categoria	17 January 1909	Juventus	3–1	Torino
1909	Prima Categoria (p-o)	24 January 1909	Torino	1–0	Juventus
1909–10	Prima Categoria	7 November 1909	Juventus	1–3	Torino
1909–10	Prima Categoria	21 November 1909	Torino	0–3	Juventus
1910–11	Prima Categoria	26 February 1911	Torino	2–1	Juventus
1910–11	Prima Categoria	2 April 1911	Juventus	1–3	Torino
1911–12	Prima Categoria	8 October 1911	Torino	2–1	Juventus
1911–12	Prima Categoria	10 December 1911	Juventus	1–1	Torino
1912–13	Prima Categoria	17 November 1912	Juventus	0–8	Torino
1912–13	Prima Categoria	19 February 1913	Torino	8–6	Juventus
1914–15	Prima Categoria	25 October 1914	Torino	1–1	Juventus
1914–15	Prima Categoria	29 November 1914	Juventus	2–7	Torino
1915–16	Coppa Federale	19 December 1915	Juventus	4–2	Torino
1915–16	Coppa Federale	9 January 1916	Torino	1–2	Juventus
1919–20	Prima Categoria	9 November 1919	Torino	1–1	Juventus
1919–20	Prima Categoria	21 December 1919	Juventus	1–1	Torino
1920–21	Prima Categoria	24 October 1920	Torino	2–2	Juventus
1920–21	Prima Categoria	30 January 1921	Juventus	0–2	Torino
1926–27	Divisione Nazionale	3 April 1927	Juventus	1–0	Torino
1926–27	Divisione Nazionale	5 June 1927	Torino	2–1	Juventus
1927–28	Divisione Nazionale	6 May 1928	Juventus	1–4	Torino
1927–28	Divisione Nazionale	1 July 1928	Torino	1–2	Juventus
1929–30	Serie A	24 November 1929	Torino	0–0	Juventus
1929–30	Serie A	27 April 1930	Juventus	2–0	Torino
1930–31	Serie A	14 December 1930	Juventus	2–0	Torino
1930–31	Serie A	31 May 1931	Torino	1–1	Juventus
1931–32	Serie A	20 December 1931	Torino	0–0	Juventus
1931–32	Serie A	15 May 1932	Juventus	3–0	Torino
1932–33	Serie A	4 December 1932	Torino	0–1	Juventus
1932–33	Serie A	30 April 1933	Juventus	2–1	Torino
1933–34	Serie A	8 October 1933	Juventus	4–0	Torino
1933–34	Serie A	18 February 1934	Torino	1–2	Juventus
1934–35	Serie A	21 October 1934	Juventus	1–1	Torino
1934–35	Serie A	10 March 1935	Torino	1–3	Juventus
1935–36	Serie A	29 September 1935	Torino	2–2	Juventus
1935–36	Serie A	2 February 1936	Juventus	2–1	Torino
1936–37	Serie A	4 October 1936	Juventus	0–1	Torino
1936–37	Serie A	7 February 1937	Torino	2–1	Juventus
1937–38	Serie A	3 October 1937	Torino	1–1	Juventus
1937–38	Serie A	6 February 1938	Juventus	3–0	Torino
1937–38	Coppa Italia Final	1 May 1938	Torino	1–3	Juventus
1937–38	Coppa Italia Final	8 May 1938	Juventus	2–1	Torino
1938–39	Serie A	15 January 1939	Torino	3–2	Juventus
1938–39	Serie A	21 May 1939	Juventus	1–1	Torino
1939–40	Serie A	15 October 1939	Torino	1–2	Juventus
1939–40	Serie A	18 February 1940	Juventus	1–1	Torino
1940–41	Serie A	15 December 1940	Torino	2–0	Juventus
1940–41	Serie A	30 March 1941	Juventus	2–1	Torino
1941–42	Serie A	14 December 1941	Juventus	3–0	Torino
1941–42	Serie A	26 April 1942	Torino	2–1	Juventus
1942–43	Serie A	18 October 1942	Juventus	2–5	Torino
1942–43	Serie A	31 January 1943	Torino	2–0	Juventus
1944	Campionato Alta Italia	13 February 1944	Torino	5–0	Juventus
1944	Campionato Alta Italia	16 April 1944	Juventus	0–0	Torino
1944	Campionato Alta Italia	21 May 1944	Juventus	3–1	Torino
1944	Campionato Alta Italia	18 June 1944	Torino	3–3	Juventus
1945–46	Serie A-B	14 October 1945	Juventus	2–1	Torino
1945–46	Serie A-B	19 March 1946	Torino	1–0	Juventus
1945–46	Serie A-B	30 May 1946	Juventus	1–0	Torino
1945–46	Serie A-B	21 July 1946	Torino	1–0	Juventus
1946–47	Serie A	20 October 1946	Torino	0–0	Juventus
1946–47	Serie A	16 March 1947	Juventus	0–1	Torino
1947–48	Serie A	26 October 1947	Torino	1–1	Juventus
1947–48	Serie A	28 March 1948	Juventus	1–1	Torino
1948–49	Serie A	24 October 1948	Juventus	1–2	Torino
1948–49	Serie A	13 February 1949	Torino	3–1	Juventus
1949–50	Serie A	6 November 1949	Torino	1–3	Juventus
1949–50	Serie A	19 March 1950	Juventus	4–3	Torino
1950–51	Serie A	12 November 1950	Juventus	4–1	Torino
1950–51	Serie A	25 March 1951	Torino	1–5	Juventus
1951–52	Serie A	2 December 1951	Torino	0–0	Juventus
1951–52	Serie A	20 March 1952	Juventus	6–0	Torino
1952–53	Serie A	9 November 1952	Juventus	4–1	Torino
1952–53	Serie A	15 March 1953	Torino	0–1	Juventus
1953–54	Serie A	18 October 1953	Torino	2–4	Juventus
1953–54	Serie A	7 March 1954	Juventus	0–0	Torino
1954–55	Serie A	14 November 1954	Juventus	3–0	Torino
1954–55	Serie A	10 April 1955	Torino	2–2	Juventus
1955–56	Serie A	9 October 1955	Torino	0–0	Juventus
1955–56	Serie A	4 March 1956	Juventus	0–2	Torino
1956–57	Serie A	28 October 1956	Juventus	1–1	Torino
1956–57	Serie A	17 March 1957	Torino	4–1	Juventus
1957–58	Serie A	13 October 1957	Torino	0–1	Juventus
1957–58	Serie A	2 March 1958	Juventus	4–1	Torino
1957–58	Coppa Italia GS	22 June 1958	Juventus	2–0	Torino
1957–58	Coppa Italia GS	13 July 1958	Torino	1–2	Juventus
1958–59	Serie A	26 October 1958	Juventus	4–3	Torino
1958–59	Serie A	15 March 1959	Torino	3–2	Juventus
1960–61	Serie A	13 November 1960	Torino	0–0	Juventus
1960–61	Serie A	19 March 1961	Juventus	1–0	Torino
1960–61	Coppa Italia 3P	29 June 1961	Juventus	2–2 (Note: Juventus won 3–2 on penalties.)	Torino
1961–62	Serie A	1 October 1961	Juventus	0–1	Torino
1961–62	Serie A	4 February 1962	Torino	1–3	Juventus
1962–63	Serie A	28 October 1962	Torino	0–1	Juventus
1962–63	Serie A	3 March 1963	Juventus	0–1	Torino
1963–64	Serie A	27 October 1963	Juventus	3–1	Torino
1963–64	Serie A	15 March 1964	Torino	0–0	Juventus
1963–64	Coppa Italia SF	10 June 1964	Torino	2–0	Juventus
1964–65	Serie A	22 November 1964	Torino	0–3	Juventus
1964–65	Serie A	4 April 1965	Juventus	1–1	Torino
1964–65	Coppa Italia SF	9 June 1965	Juventus	1–0	Torino
1965–66	Serie A	21 November 1965	Juventus	2–0	Torino
1965–66	Serie A	3 April 1966	Torino	0–0	Juventus
1966–67	Serie A	16 October 1966	Torino	0–0	Juventus
1966–67	Serie A	26 February 1967	Juventus	0–0	Torino

Season	Competition	Date	Home team	Result	Away team
1967–68	Serie A	22 October 1967	Juventus	0–4	Torino
1967–68	Serie A	18 February 1968	Torino	2–1	Juventus
1968–69	Serie A	17 November 1968	Torino	1–2	Juventus
1968–69	Serie A	16 March 1969	Juventus	0–0	Torino
1969–70	Serie A	12 October 1969	Juventus	1–2	Torino
1969–70	Serie A	8 February 1970	Torino	0–3	Juventus
1970–71	Serie A	22 November 1970	Torino	2–1	Juventus
1970–71	Serie A	21 March 1971	Juventus	3–3	Torino
1971–72	Serie A	5 December 1971	Juventus	2–1	Torino
1971–72	Serie A	26 March 1972	Torino	2–1	Juventus
1971–72	Coppa Italia R2	8 May 1972	Juventus	2–1	Torino
1971–72	Coppa Italia R2	28 May 1972	Torino	2–1	Juventus
1972–73	Serie A	5 November 1972	Torino	2–1	Juventus
1972–73	Serie A	4 March 1973	Juventus	0–2	Torino
1973–74	Serie A	9 December 1973	Torino	0–1	Juventus
1973–74	Serie A	31 March 1974	Juventus	1–1	Torino
1974–75	Serie A	8 December 1974	Juventus	0–0	Torino
1974–75	Serie A	30-3-1975	Torino	3–2	Juventus
1975–76	Serie A	7 December 1975	Torino	2–0	Juventus
1975–76	Serie A	28 March 1976	Juventus	0–2	Torino
1976–77	Serie A	5 December 1976	Juventus	0–2	Torino
1976–77	Serie A	3 April 1977	Torino	1–1	Juventus
1977–78	Serie A	11 December 1977	Torino	0–0	Juventus
1977–78	Serie A	2 April 1978	Juventus	0–0	Torino
1978–79	Serie A	19 November 1978	Juventus	1–1	Torino
1978–79	Serie A	25 March 1979	Torino	0–1	Juventus
1979–80	Serie A	21 October 1979	Torino	1–2	Juventus
1979–80	Serie A	24 February 1980	Juventus	0–0	Torino
1979–80	Coppa Italia SF	26 April 1980	Juventus	0–0	Torino
1979–80	Coppa Italia SF	30 April 1980	Torino	0–0 (Note: Torino won 4–2 on penalties.)	Juventus
1980–81	Serie A	26 October 1980	Juventus	1–2	Torino
1980–81	Serie A	15 April 1981	Torino	0–2	Juventus
1981–82	Coppa Italia GS	6 September 1981	Juventus	0–1	Torino
1981–82	Serie A	25 October 1981	Torino	0–1	Juventus
1981–82	Serie A	7 March 1982	Juventus	4–2	Torino
1982–83	Serie A	21 November 1982	Juventus	1–0	Torino
1982–83	Serie A	27 March 1983	Torino	3–2	Juventus
1983–84	Serie A	23 October 1983	Torino	2–1	Juventus
1983–84	Serie A	26 February 1984	Juventus	2–1	Torino
1984–85	Serie A	18 November 1984	Juventus	1–2	Torino
1984–85	Serie A	31 April 1985	Torino	0–2	Juventus
1985–86	Serie A	13 October 1985	Torino	1–2	Juventus
1985–86	Serie A	16 February 1986	Juventus	1–1	Torino
1986–87	Serie A	14 December 1986	Juventus	1–0	Torino
1986–87	Serie A	26 April 1987	Torino	1–1	Juventus
1987–88	Serie A	3 January 1988	Torino	2–2	Juventus
1987–88	Coppa Italia SF	6 April 1988	Torino	2–0	Juventus
1987–88	Coppa Italia SF	20 April 1988	Juventus	2–1	Torino
1987–88	Serie A	1 May 1988	Juventus	2–1	Torino
1988–89	UEFA Cup play-off	23 May 1988	Juventus	0–0 (Note: Juventus won 4–2 on penalties.)	Torino
1988–89	Serie A	31 December 1988	Juventus	1–0	Torino
1988–89	Serie A	14 May 1989	Torino	0–0	Juventus
1990–91	Serie A	9 December 1990	Torino	1–1	Juventus
1990–91	Serie A	14 April 1991	Juventus	1–2	Torino
1991–92	Serie A	17 November 1991	Juventus	1–0	Torino
1991–92	Serie A	5 April 1992	Torino	2–0	Juventus
1992–93	Serie A	22 November 1992	Torino	1–2	Juventus
1992–93	Coppa Italia SF	9 March 1993	Torino	1–1	Juventus
1992–93	Coppa Italia SF	31 March 1993	Juventus	2–2 (Note: Torino won on away goals.)	Torino
1992–93	Serie A	10 April 1993	Juventus	2–1	Torino
1993–94	Serie A	3 October 1993	Juventus	3–2	Torino
1993–94	Serie A	20 February 1994	Torino	1–1	Juventus
1994–95	Serie A	25 January 1995	Torino	3–2	Juventus
1994–95	Serie A	9 April 1995	Juventus	1–2	Torino
1995–96	Serie A	3 December 1995	Juventus	5–0	Torino
1995–96	Serie A	6 April 1996	Torino	1–2	Juventus
1999–2000	Serie A	7 November 1999	Torino	0–0	Juventus
1999–2000	Serie A	19 March 2000	Juventus	3–2	Torino
2001–02	Serie A	14 October 2001	Juventus	3–3	Torino
2001–02	Serie A	24 February 2002	Torino	2–2	Juventus
2002–03	Serie A	17 November 2002	Torino	0–4	Juventus
2002–03	Serie A	5 April 2003	Juventus	2–0	Torino
2007–08	Serie A	30 September 2007	Torino	0–1	Juventus
2007–08	Serie A	26 February 2008	Juventus	0–0	Torino
2008–09	Serie A	25 October 2008	Juventus	1–0	Torino
2008–09	Serie A	7 March 2009	Torino	0–1	Juventus
2012–13	Serie A	1 December 2012	Juventus	3–0	Torino
2012–13	Serie A	28 April 2013	Torino	0–2	Juventus
2013–14	Serie A	29 September 2013	Torino	0–1	Juventus
2013–14	Serie A	23 February 2014	Juventus	1–0	Torino
2014–15	Serie A	30 November 2014	Juventus	2–1	Torino
2014–15	Serie A	26 April 2015	Torino	2–1	Juventus
2015–16	Serie A	31 October 2015	Juventus	2–1	Torino
2015–16	Coppa Italia R16	16 December 2015	Juventus	4–0	Torino
2015–16	Serie A	20 March 2016	Torino	1–4	Juventus
2016–17	Serie A	11 December 2016	Torino	1–3	Juventus
2016–17	Serie A	6 May 2017	Juventus	1–1	Torino
2017–18	Serie A	23 September 2017	Juventus	4–0	Torino
2017–18	Coppa Italia QF	3 January 2018	Juventus	2–0	Torino
2017–18	Serie A	18 February 2018	Torino	0–1	Juventus
2018–19	Serie A	15 December 2018	Torino	0–1	Juventus
2018–19	Serie A	3 May 2019	Juventus	1–1	Torino
2019–20	Serie A	2 November 2019	Torino	0–1	Juventus
2019–20	Serie A	4 July 2020	Juventus	4–1	Torino
2020–21	Serie A	5 December 2020	Juventus	2–1	Torino
2020–21	Serie A	3 April 2021	Torino	2–2	Juventus
2021–22	Serie A	2 October 2021	Torino	0–1	Juventus
2021–22	Serie A	18 February 2022	Juventus	1–1	Torino
2022–23	Serie A	15 October 2022	Torino	0–1	Juventus
2022–23	Serie A	28 February 2023	Juventus	4–2	Torino
2023–24	Serie A	7 October 2023	Juventus	2–0	Torino
2023–24	Serie A	13 April 2024	Torino	0–0	Juventus
2024–25	Serie A	9 November 2024	Juventus	2–0	Torino
2024–25	Serie A	11 January 2025	Torino	1–1	Juventus
2025–26	Serie A	8 November 2025	Juventus	0–0	Torino
2025–26	Serie A	24 May 2026	Torino	2–2	Juventus

== Incidents ==
In 1967 after a derby Torino won 4–0, incensed Juventus fans vandalized the grave of former Torino player Gigi Meroni.

On 27 March 1983, Torino, down 0–2, overturned the deficit in the 75th minute by scoring three goals in just over three minutes to win 3–2. Another remarkable encounter took place on 14 October 2001, when Torino, trailing 0–3 at halftime, came back to tie the game 3–3 (taking advantage of a penalty miss by Juventus player Marcelo Salas, who would have scored 4–3 to Juventus). This was made famous by Torino midfielder Riccardo Maspero, who grooved a hole on the penalty spot before Salas kicked it. In the return leg, that ended 2–2, Juventus midfielder Enzo Maresca notably celebrated a late equaliser by parodying the 'horns of the bull' (the bull being the Torino's club symbol), a gesture usually done by former Torino captain Marco Ferrante.

Prior to a derby match during the 2007–08 season, riots took place and chaos broke out as police tried to control the hooligans involved. There were 40 arrests made and 2 injured policemen. Rubbish bins were set on fire and many cars and shops vandalized as a result.

On 1 December 2012 the two clubs met in Serie A for the first time in three seasons and it was the first derby hosted at the Juventus Stadium. Prior to kick-off, several fans from both sides were arrested for starting a brawl and vandalism. Juventus won 3–0, with all three goals scored by Turin-born Juventus youth products Claudio Marchisio (2) and Sebastian Giovinco (1). The match was marred by a red card, a €10,000 fine for Juventus for an offensive banner some of its supporters had displayed about the infamous Superga air disaster and a €25,000 fine for Torino after their fans vandalised stadium toilets and seats.

== Statistics ==
As of 24 May 2026

Competition	Total matches played	Juventus wins	Draws	Torino wins	Juventus goals	Torino goals
Prima Categoria	18	2	5	11	26	49
Divisione Nazionale	8	4	0	4	8	10
Serie A	162	78	49	35	250	161
Total (league)	188	84	54	50	284	220
Coppa Federale	2	2	0	0	6	3
1944 Campionato Alta Italia	4	1	2	1	6	9
Play-off	2	0	1	1	0	1
Coppa Italia	18	9	5	4	26	17
Total (official)	214	96	62	56	322	250
Other meetings	41	16	8	17	75	77
Total	255	112	70	73	397	327

=== Top scorers ===
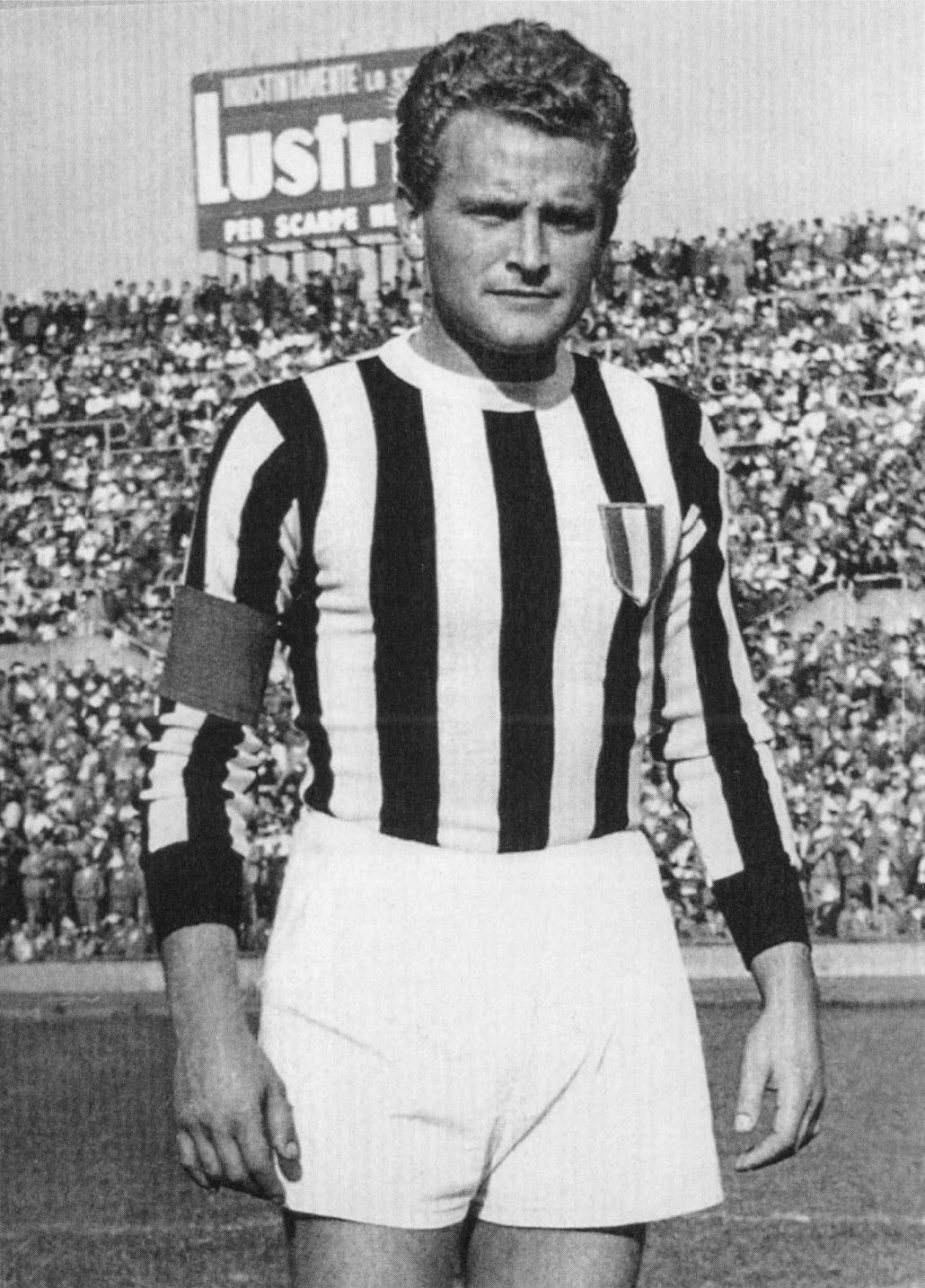
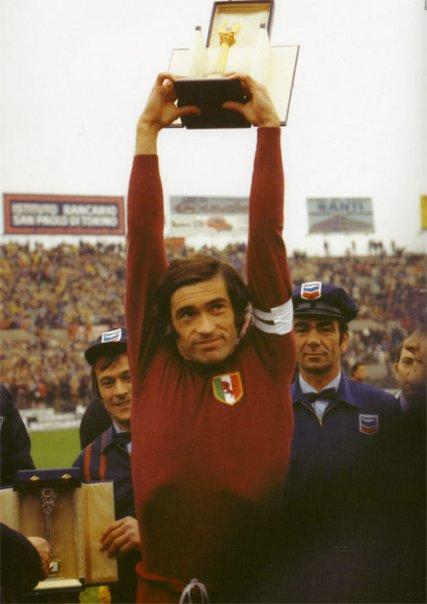
The Bianconero Giampiero Boniperti, the top scorer of the Turin derby (14), and Paolo Pulici, the highest scorer of the Granata (9)

Below is the list of top scorers in all official competitions of the Turin derby:

Rank	Player	Team(s)	Goals
1	(Italy) Giampiero Boniperti	Juventus	14
2	(Italy) Guglielmo Gabetto	Juventus (7); Torino (5)	12
3	(Italy) Paolino Pulici	Torino	9
4	(Italy) Felice Borel	Juventus	8
5	(Italy) Francesco Graziani	Torino	7
5	(Italy) Eugenio Mosso	Torino	7
5	(France) Michel Platini	Juventus	7
5	(Italy) Gianluca Vialli	Juventus	7
9	(Italy) Pietro Anastasi	Juventus	6
9	(Argentina) (Italy) Julio Libonatti	Torino	6
9	(Argentina) (Italy) Omar Sívori	Juventus	6
12	(Italy) Carlo Capra	Torino	5
12	(Wales) John Charles	Juventus	5
12	(Italy) Hans Kämpfer	Torino	5
12	(Italy) Valentino Mazzola	Torino	5
12	(Italy) Silvio Piola	Juventus (2); Torino (3)	5
12	(Italy) Ruggiero Rizzitelli	Torino	5

=== Most managerial wins ===
Below is the list of club manager wins in all official competitions of the Turin derby:

Rank	Manager	Team	Wins
1	(Italy) Massimiliano Allegri	Juventus	13
1	(Italy) Giovanni Trapattoni	Juventus	13
3	(Italy) Carlo Carcano	Juventus	7
4	(Italy) Luigi Radice	Torino	5
5	(Socialist Federal Republic of Yugoslavia) Ljubiša Broćić	Juventus	4
5	(England) Jesse Carver	Juventus	4
5	(Italy) Antonio Conte	Juventus	4
5	(Italy) Gustavo Giagnoni	Torino	4
5	(Italy) Vittorio Pozzo	Torino	4
10	(Austria) (Italy) Tony Cargnelli	Torino	3
10	(Italy) Luigi Ferrero	Torino	3
10	(Paraguay) Heriberto Herrera	Juventus	3
10	(Italy) Marcello Lippi	Juventus	3
10	(Italy) Virginio Rosetta	Juventus	3

=== Records ===
- Match with most goals: 14, Torino 8–6 Juventus on 19 February 1913.
- Victory with the largest margin in favour of Torino: 0–8 on 17 November 1912.
- Victory with the largest margin in favour of Juventus: 6–0 on 20 April 1952.
- Most wins in a row: Juventus – 7 – from 25 October 2008 until 30 November 2014.
- Consecutive draws: 4, from 3 April 1977 until 19 November 1978.
- Most consecutive matches without a win: Torino, 20, from 31 October 2015 to present.
- Most minutes without conceding a goal: Juventus, 931 minutes, from 24 February 2002 until 30 November 2014.
- Fastest goal: Valentino Mazzola, Torino, after 1' (18 June 1944).
- Best comeback win: Juventus, from 0–2 to 4–2 (7 March 1982).
- Best comeback: Torino, from 0–3 to 3–3 (14 October 2001).
- Top scorer in a single derby: Hans Kämpfer, Torino, 4 goals (3 February 1907).
- Scorer in multiple consecutive derby: Felice Borel, Juventus, 6 goals, from 4 December 1932 until 10 March 1935.
- Most derbies disputed in a calendar year: 6 (1988), including 3 in the league, 2 in Coppa Italia and 1 play-off for admission to the UEFA Cup.
- Record attendance: 70,200, Juventus 0–1 in Turin (28 October 1962).
- Juventus won at least once in each of the twelve decades in which the derby was played, while Torino failed to win in the decade 2000–2009.
- Unbeaten goalkeeper Gianluigi Buffon, Juventus, 864 minutes.

== Head-to-head ranking in Serie A (1930–2026) ==
P.	30	31	32	33	34	35	36	37	38	39	40	41	42	43	47	48	49	50	51	52	53	54	55	56	57	58	59	60	61	62	63	64	65	66	67	68	69	70	71	72	73	74	75	76	77	78	79	80	81	82	83	84	85	86	87	88	89	90	91	92	93	94	95	96	97	98	99	00	01	02	03	04	05	06	07	08	09	10	11	12	13	14	15	16	17	18	19	20	21	22	23	24	25	26
1		1	1	1	1	1								1	1	1	1	1		1						1		1	1						1					1	1		1	1	1	1			1	1		1		1									1		1	1				1	1		1							1	1	1	1	1	1	1	1	1						
2									2	2			2		2	2					2	2									2											2		2	2			2			2		2		2					2		2		2				2	2								2																	
3	3						3	3			3			3					3														3			3		3		3						3	3	3												3												3				3																3		
4	4																4										4					4	4						4															4			4	4			4																												4	4			4	
5							5	5				5													5									5			5					5					5					5							5																																			
6											6		6					6																			6				6		6										6			6																																						6
7		7		7								7											7			7				7		7			7	7		7																		7			7								7											7	7			7					7				7			
8			8						8	8																					8								8												8											8																																
9																						9	9	9	9																								9	9											9																						9		9	9						9		
10																					10													10																																																								10	10			
11																																																							11								11							11																							11	
12					12															12									12	12																																																						12										12
13																																																																																														
14						14																																																																																								
15																			15																																						15											15								15																		
16																																																																16											16						16							16						
17																											17																																																														17					
18																																																																							18						18																	
19																																																																																														
20																																																																										20																				

• Total: Juventus with 65 higher finishes, Torino with 15 higher finishes, and 1 equal finish (as of the end of the 2025–26 season). No head-to-heads in 13 seasons, since Torino and Juventus were in Serie B respectively in twelve and one (2007) of those.

Notes:

- 1945–46 Italian Football Championship is not included in Serie A statistics.
- Both teams finished with the same number of points in 1956, and the regulation of the time did not contemplate tiebreakers: both teams finished in ninth place.
- Due to the Calciopoli scandal, Juventus' 2004–05 title was voided, while in the 2005–06 season Juventus was relegated and the title was awarded to Inter Milan.

== Trophies ==
As of 15 May 2024

- Numbers with this background denote the competition record.

Juventus	Competition	Torino
Domestic
36	Serie A	7
15	Coppa Italia	5
9	Supercoppa Italiana	—
60	Domestic total	12
International
2	UEFA Champions League	—
1	UEFA Cup Winners' Cup (defunct)	—
3	UEFA Europa League	—
2	UEFA Super Cup	—
1	UEFA Intertoto Cup (defunct)	—
2	Intercontinental Cup (defunct)	—
—	FIFA Club World Cup	—
11	International total	—
71	Grand total	12

== Bibliography ==
- Giorgio Welter (2011). Codice Atlantico (ed.). Le maglie dei campioni. Milano. ISBN 978-88-905512-2-2.
- Giorgio Welter (2013). Codice Atlantico (ed.). Le maglie della Serie A. Milano. ISBN 978-88-905512-9-1.
