= Canfari =

Canfari is an Italian surname. Notable people with the surname include:

- Enrico Canfari (1877–1915), Italian footballer and sporting director
- Eugenio Canfari (1877–1962), Italian footballer, brother of Enrico
