= Laich =

Laich is a surname. Notable people with the surname include:

- Angela Laich (born 1963), German sculptor, draughtsperson, and painter
- Brooks Laich (born 1983), Canadian ice hockey player
- Katherine Laich (1910–1992), American librarian
- Max Laich (fl. 1908–1910), Swiss footballer
