= Albert Weber =

Albert Weber may refer to:

- Albert Weber Sr. (1829–1879), musician and founder of the Weber Piano Company
- Albert Weber Jr. (1858–1908), his son, 2nd president of the Weber Piano Company
- Albert J. Weber (1859–1925), associate justice and chief justice of the Utah Supreme Court
- Albert Weber (German footballer) (1888–1940), German amateur footballer
- Albert Weber (Swiss footballer) (fl. 1887–1901), Swiss footballer and referee
- Albert Herman Weber (died 1945), husband of Lenora Mattingly Weber

== See also ==
- A. R. F. Webber (Albert Raymond Forbes Webber, 1880–1932), Tobago-born Guyanese politician, author and newspaper editor
