= Capocannoniere =

Award by the Italian Footballers' Association

Paolo Rossi Award
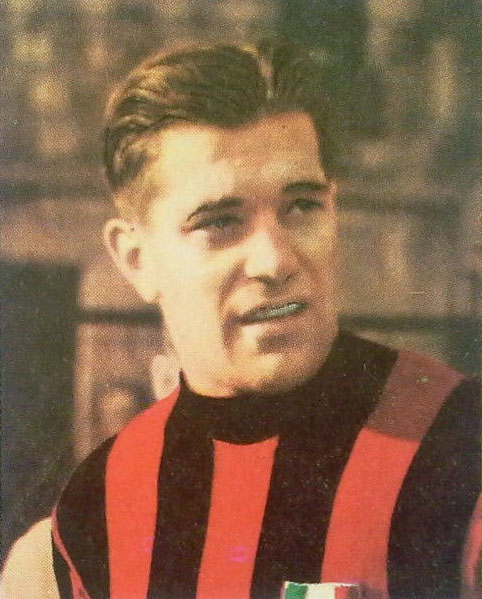
- Gunnar Nordahl won the capocannoniere award five times while playing at AC Milan, a record.
- Awarded for: The leading goalscorer in a single Serie A season
- Country: Italy
- Presented by: Italian Footballers' Association
- Formerly called: Capocannoniere
- First award: 2011
- Currently held by: Lautaro Martínez (2025–26)

Highlights
- Most wins: Gunnar Nordahl (5)

The capocannoniere, (Note: Italian: [ˌkapokannoˈnjɛːre]; lit. 'head gunner') known as the Paolo Rossi Award since 2021, is an award given by the Italian Footballers' Association (AIC) to the top goalscorer each season in the Serie A football league. From the 2010–11 season until 2021, it was called the AIC Award to the Top Scorer. (Note: Italian: Premio AIC al Capocannoniere in Italian) The award is currently held by Lautaro Martínez, who scored 17 goals for Inter Milan in the 2025–26 season.

The highest number of goals scored to win the Capocannoniere is 37, by Luigi Cevenini for Inter Milan. Gino Rossetti, Gonzalo Higuaín and Ciro Immobile are in joint second place for this record; they each scored 36 goals for Torino, Napoli and Lazio respectively.

Gunnar Nordahl of AC Milan has won the title of capocannoniere five times: 1949–50, 1950–51, 1952–53, 1953–54 and 1954–55, more than any other player in the history of Italian championship.

== Winners ==
Data relating to seasons prior to 1923–24 are incomplete or imprecise due to scarcity of sources.

Key

Player also won the European Golden Shoe (first awarded in 1968)

| Season | Player(s) | Nationality | Club(s) | Goals | Ref. |
|---|---|---|---|---|---|
| 1898 | Edoardo Bosio Norman Victor Leaver | Italy England | Internazionale Torino Genoa | 2 | |
| 1899 | Albert Weber | Switzerland | Internazionale Torino | 2 | |
| 1900 | Unknown | | | | |
| 1901 | Umberto Malvano | Italy | Juventus | 4 | |
| 1902 | Unknown | | | | |
| 1903 | Umberto Malvano (2) | Italy | Juventus | 4 | |
| 1904 | Unknown (Note: It is presumed to be Walter Streule, with 2 goals.) | | Juventus | | |
| 1905 | Unknown | | | | |
| 1906 | Guido Pedroni | Italy | AC Milan | 3 | |
| 1907 | Hans Kämpfer | Switzerland | Torino | 7 | |
| 1908 | Mario Cagliani | Italy | US Milanese | 4 | |
| 1909 | Amilcare Pizzi | Italy | US Milanese | 7 | |
| 1909–10 | Ernest Peterly | Switzerland | Inter Milan | 22 | |
| 1910–11 | Unknown | | | | |
| 1911–12 | Carlo Rampini | Italy | Pro Vercelli | 28 | |
| 1912–13 | Unknown | | | | |
| 1913–14 | Luigi Cevenini | Italy | Inter Milan | 37 | |
| 1914–15 | Unknown | | | | |
| 1915–19 | Not awarded | | | | |
| 1919–20 | Mario Magnozzi (1) | Italy | Livorno | 29 | |
| 1920–21 | Luigi Cevenini (2) | Italy | Inter Milan | 31 | |
| 1921–22 (FIGC) | Unknown | | | | |
| 1921–22 (CCI) | Unknown | | | | |
| 1922–23 | Fulvio Bernardini | Italy | Lazio | 24 | |
| 1923–24 | Heinrich Schönfeld | Austria | Torino | 22 | |
| 1924–25 | Mario Magnozzi (2) | Italy | Livorno | 19 | |
| 1925–26 | Ferenc Hirzer | Hungary | Juventus | 35 | |
| 1926–27 | Anton Powolny | Austria | Inter Milan | 22 | |
| 1927–28 | Julio Libonatti | Italy (Note: Italian by naturalisation.) | Torino | 36 | |
| 1928–29 | Gino Rossetti | Italy | Torino | 36 | |
| Foundation of Serie A | | | | | |
| 1929–30 | Giuseppe Meazza | Italy | Ambrosiana-Inter | 31 | |
| 1930–31 | Rodolfo Volk | Italy | Roma | 28 | |
| 1931–32 | Angelo Schiavio Pedro Petrone | Italy Uruguay | Bologna Fiorentina | 25 | |
| 1932–33 | Felice Borel | Italy | Juventus | 29 | |
| 1933–34 | Felice Borel (2) | Italy | Juventus | 32 | |
| 1934–35 | Enrique Guaita | Italy | Roma | 28 | |
| 1935–36 | Giuseppe Meazza (2) | Italy | Ambrosiana-Inter | 25 | |
| 1936–37 | Silvio Piola | Italy | Lazio | 21 | |
| 1937–38 | Giuseppe Meazza (3) | Italy | Ambrosiana-Inter | 20 | |
| 1938–39 | Ettore Puricelli Aldo Boffi | Uruguay Italy | Bologna AC Milan | 19 | |
| 1939–40 | Aldo Boffi (2) | Italy | AC Milan | 24 | |
| 1940–41 | Ettore Puricelli (2) | Italy | Bologna | 22 | |
| 1941–42 | Aldo Boffi (3) | Italy | AC Milan | 22 | |
| 1942–43 | Silvio Piola (2) | Italy | Lazio | 21 | |
| 1943–45 | Not awarded | | | | |
| 1945–46 | Guglielmo Gabetto | Italy | Torino | 22 | |
| 1946–47 | Valentino Mazzola | Italy | Torino | 29 | |
| 1947–48 | Giampiero Boniperti | Italy | Juventus | 27 | |
| 1948–49 | István Nyers | Hungary | Inter Milan | 26 | |
| 1949–50 | Gunnar Nordahl | Sweden | AC Milan | 35 | |
| 1950–51 | Gunnar Nordahl (2) | Sweden | AC Milan | 34 | |
| 1951–52 | John Hansen | Denmark | Juventus | 30 | |
| 1952–53 | Gunnar Nordahl (3) | Sweden | AC Milan | 26 | |
| 1953–54 | Gunnar Nordahl (4) | Sweden | AC Milan | 23 | |
| 1954–55 | Gunnar Nordahl (5) | Sweden | AC Milan | 27 | |
| 1955–56 | Gino Pivatelli | Italy | Bologna | 29 | |
| 1956–57 | Dino da Costa | Brazil | Roma | 22 | |
| 1957–58 | John Charles | Wales | Juventus | 28 | |
| 1958–59 | Antonio Valentín Angelillo | Argentina | Inter Milan | 33 | |
| 1959–60 | Omar Sívori | Argentina | Juventus | 28 | |
| 1960–61 | Sergio Brighenti | Italy | Sampdoria | 27 | |
| 1961–62 | José Altafini Aurelio Milani | Italy Italy | AC Milan Fiorentina | 22 | |
| 1962–63 | Harald Nielsen Pedro Manfredini | Denmark Argentina | Bologna Roma | 19 | |
| 1963–64 | Harald Nielsen (2) | Denmark | Bologna | 21 | |
| 1964–65 | Sandro Mazzola Alberto Orlando | Italy Italy | Inter Milan Fiorentina | 17 | |
| 1965–66 | Luís Vinício | Brazil | Vicenza | 25 | |
| 1966–67 | Gigi Riva | Italy | Cagliari | 18 | |
| 1967–68 | Pierino Prati | Italy | AC Milan | 15 | |
| 1968–69 | Gigi Riva (2) | Italy | Cagliari | 21 | |
| 1969–70 | Gigi Riva (3) | Italy | Cagliari | 21 | |
| 1970–71 | Roberto Boninsegna | Italy | Inter Milan | 24 | |
| 1971–72 | Roberto Boninsegna (2) | Italy | Inter Milan | 22 | |
| 1972–73 | Giuseppe Savoldi Paolino Pulici Gianni Rivera | Italy Italy Italy | Bologna Torino AC Milan | 17 | |
| 1973–74 | Giorgio Chinaglia | Italy | Lazio | 24 | |
| 1974–75 | Paolino Pulici (2) | Italy | Torino | 18 | |
| 1975–76 | Paolino Pulici (3) | Italy | Torino | 21 | |
| 1976–77 | Francesco Graziani | Italy | Torino | 21 | |
| 1977–78 | Paolo Rossi | Italy | Vicenza | 24 | |
| 1978–79 | Bruno Giordano | Italy | Lazio | 19 | |
| 1979–80 | Roberto Bettega | Italy | Juventus | 16 | |
| 1980–81 | Roberto Pruzzo | Italy | Roma | 18 | |
| 1981–82 | Roberto Pruzzo (2) | Italy | Roma | 15 | |
| 1982–83 | Michel Platini | France | Juventus | 16 | |
| 1983–84 | Michel Platini (2) | France | Juventus | 20 | |
| 1984–85 | Michel Platini (3) | France | Juventus | 18 | |
| 1985–86 | Roberto Pruzzo (3) | Italy | Roma | 19 | |
| 1986–87 | Pietro Paolo Virdis | Italy | AC Milan | 17 | |
| 1987–88 | Diego Maradona | Argentina | Napoli | 15 | |
| 1988–89 | Aldo Serena | Italy | Inter Milan | 22 | |
| 1989–90 | Marco van Basten | Netherlands | AC Milan | 19 | |
| 1990–91 | Gianluca Vialli | Italy | Sampdoria | 19 | |
| 1991–92 | Marco van Basten (2) | Netherlands | AC Milan | 25 | |
| 1992–93 | Giuseppe Signori | Italy | Lazio | 26 | |
| 1993–94 | Giuseppe Signori (2) | Italy | Lazio | 23 | |
| 1994–95 | Gabriel Batistuta | Argentina | Fiorentina | 26 | |
| 1995–96 | Igor Protti Giuseppe Signori (3) | Italy Italy | Bari Lazio | 24 | |
| 1996–97 | Filippo Inzaghi | Italy | Atalanta | 24 | |
| 1997–98 | Oliver Bierhoff | Germany | Udinese | 27 | |
| 1998–99 | Márcio Amoroso | Brazil | Udinese | 22 | |
| 1999–2000 | Andriy Shevchenko | Ukraine | AC Milan | 24 | |
| 2000–01 | Hernán Crespo | Argentina | Lazio | 26 | |
| 2001–02 | David Trezeguet Dario Hübner | France Italy | Juventus Piacenza | 24 | |
| 2002–03 | Christian Vieri | Italy | Inter Milan | 24 | |
| 2003–04 | Andriy Shevchenko (2) | Ukraine | AC Milan | 24 | |
| 2004–05 | Cristiano Lucarelli | Italy | Livorno | 24 | |
| 2005–06 | Luca Toni | Italy | Fiorentina | 31 | |
| 2006–07 | Francesco Totti | Italy | Roma | 26 | |
| 2007–08 | Alessandro Del Piero | Italy | Juventus | 21 | |
| 2008–09 | Zlatan Ibrahimović | Sweden | Inter Milan | 25 | |
| 2009–10 | Antonio Di Natale | Italy | Udinese | 29 | |
| AIC Award to the Top Scorer | | | | | |
| 2010–11 | Antonio Di Natale (2) | Italy | Udinese | 28 | |
| 2011–12 | Zlatan Ibrahimović (2) | Sweden | AC Milan | 28 | |
| 2012–13 | Edinson Cavani | Uruguay | Napoli | 29 | |
| 2013–14 | Ciro Immobile | Italy | Torino | 22 | |
| 2014–15 | Mauro Icardi Luca Toni (2) | Argentina Italy | Inter Milan Hellas Verona | 22 | |
| 2015–16 | Gonzalo Higuaín | Argentina | Napoli | 36 | |
| 2016–17 | Edin Džeko | Bosnia and Herzegovina | Roma | 29 | |
| 2017–18 | Mauro Icardi (2) Ciro Immobile (2) | Argentina Italy | Inter Milan Lazio | 29 | |
| 2018–19 | Fabio Quagliarella | Italy | Sampdoria | 26 | |
| 2019–20 | Ciro Immobile (3) | Italy | Lazio | 36 | |
| Paolo Rossi Award | | | | | |
| 2020–21 | Cristiano Ronaldo | Portugal | Juventus | 29 | |
| 2021–22 | Ciro Immobile (4) | Italy | Lazio | 27 | |
| 2022–23 | Victor Osimhen | Nigeria | Napoli | 26 | |
| 2023–24 | Lautaro Martínez | Argentina | Inter Milan | 24 | |
| 2024–25 | Mateo Retegui | Italy | Atalanta | 25 | |
| 2025–26 | Lautaro Martínez (2) | Argentina | Inter Milan | 17 | |

== Statistics ==
=== Wins by player (multiple) ===
The capocannonieri are unknown for 9 seasons.

| Awards | Player | Club(s) | Country | Seasons |
|---|---|---|---|---|
| 5 | Gunnar Nordahl | AC Milan | Sweden | 1949–50, 1950–51, 1952–53, 1953–54, 1954–55 |
| 4 | Ciro Immobile | Torino, Lazio | Italy | 2013–14, 2017–18, 2019–20, 2021–22 |
| 3 | Giuseppe Meazza | Inter Milan | Italy | 1929–30, 1935–36, 1937–38 |
| 3 | Aldo Boffi | AC Milan | Italy | 1938–39, 1939–40, 1941–42 |
| 3 | Gigi Riva | Cagliari | Italy | 1966–67, 1968–69, 1969–70 |
| 3 | Paolo Pulici | Torino | Italy | 1972–73, 1974–75, 1975–76 |
| 3 | Roberto Pruzzo | Roma | Italy | 1980–81, 1981–82, 1985–86 |
| 3 | Michel Platini | Juventus | France | 1982–83, 1983–84, 1984–85 |
| 3 | Giuseppe Signori | Lazio | Italy | 1992–93, 1993–94, 1995–96 |
| 2 | Roberto Boninsegna | Inter Milan | Italy | 1970–71, 1971–72 |
| 2 | Felice Borel | Juventus | Kingdom of Italy | 1932–33, 1933–34 |
| 2 | Luigi Cevenini | Inter Milan | Kingdom of Italy | 1913–14, 1920–21 |
| 2 | Antonio Di Natale | Udinese | Italy | 2009–10, 2010–11 |
| 2 | Zlatan Ibrahimović | Inter Milan, AC Milan | Sweden | 2008–09, 2011–12 |
| 2 | Mauro Icardi | Inter Milan | Argentina | 2014–15, 2017–18 |
| 2 | Mario Magnozzi | Inter Milan | Kingdom of Italy | 1919–20, 1924–25 |
| 2 | Umberto Malvano | Juventus | Kingdom of Italy | 1901, 1903 |
| 2 | Lautaro Martínez | Inter Milan | Argentina | 2023–24, 2025–26 |
| 2 | Harald Nielsen | Bologna | Denmark | 1962–63, 1963–64 |
| 2 | Silvio Piola | Lazio | Kingdom of Italy | 1936–37, 1942–43 |
| 2 | Ettore Puricelli | Bologna | Uruguay | 1938–39, 1940–41 |
| 2 | Ettore Puricelli | Bologna | Kingdom of Italy | 1938–39, 1940–41 |
| 2 | Andriy Shevchenko | AC Milan | Ukraine | 1999–2000, 2003–04 |
| 2 | Luca Toni | Fiorentina, Verona | Italy | 2005–06, 2014–15 |
| 2 | Marco van Basten | AC Milan | Netherlands | 1989–90, 1991–92 |

=== Wins by club ===
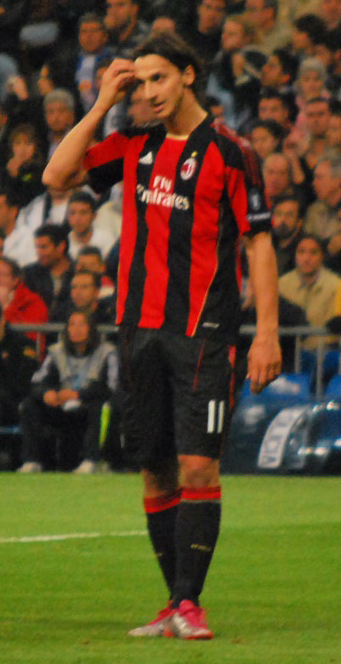
The capocannoniere has been won 18 times by AC Milan players, the most recent being Zlatan Ibrahimović in 2012

The players' clubs are unknown for 8 seasons. Current Serie A teams are shown in bold.

| Club | Total |
|---|---|
| **Inter Milan** | 19 |
| **Milan** | 18 |
| **Juventus** | 17 |
| **Lazio** | 12 |
| **Torino** | 11 |
| **Roma** | 9 |
| **Bologna** | 7 |
| **Fiorentina** | 5 |
| **Napoli** | 4 |
| **Udinese** | 4 |
| **Cagliari** | 3 |
| Livorno | 3 |
| Sampdoria | 3 |
| **Atalanta** | 2 |
| Internazionale Torino | 2 |
| US Milanese | 2 |
| Vicenza | 2 |
| Bari | 1 |
| **Genoa** | 1 |
| Piacenza | 1 |
| Pro Vercelli | 1 |
| **Hellas Verona** | 1 |

=== Wins by country ===
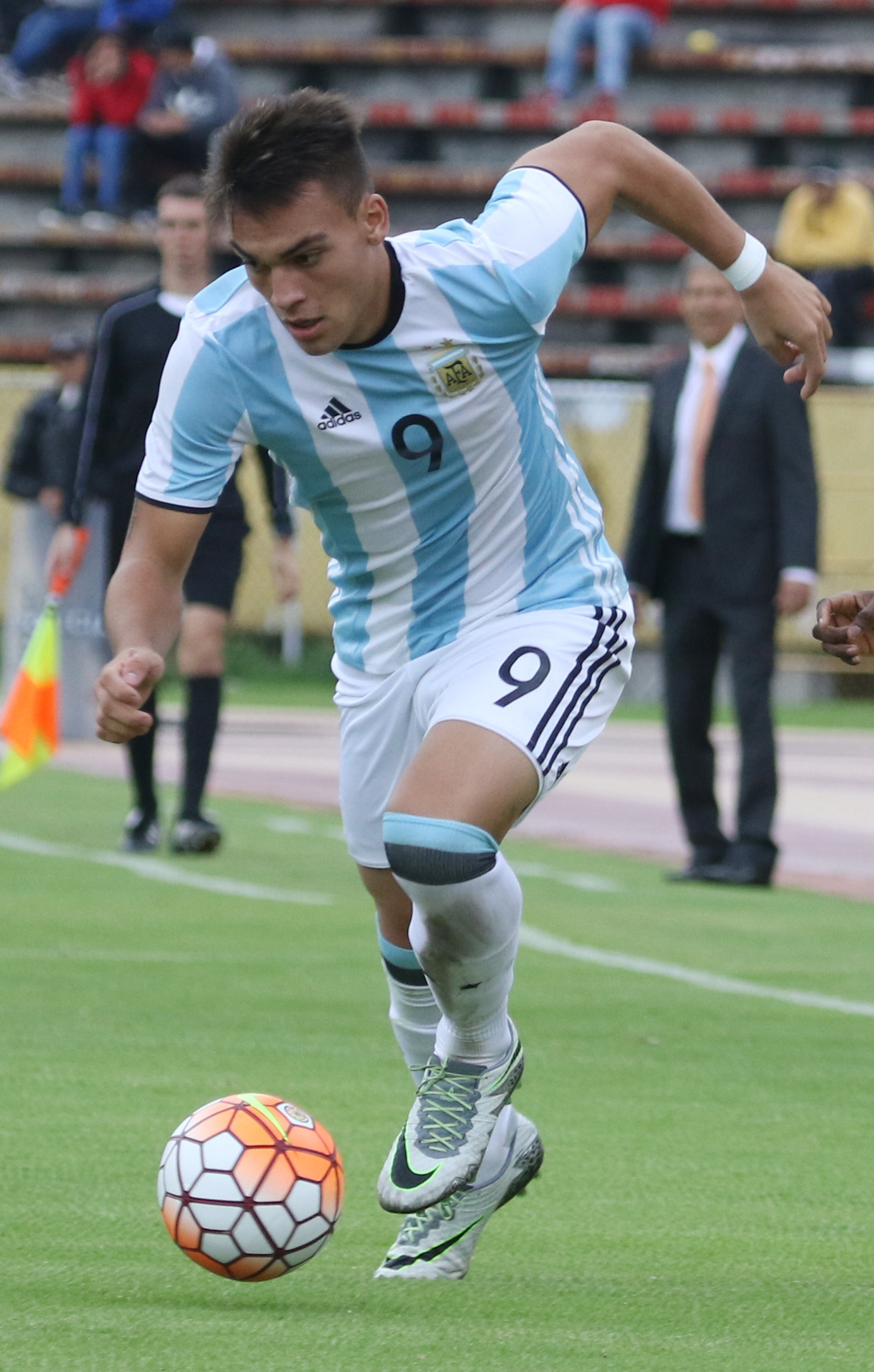
Argentines are the most prolific foreign winners of the capocannoniere, the most recent being Lautaro Martínez of Inter Milan in 2026.

The nationalities are unknown for 9 seasons.

| Country | Total |
|---|---|
| Italy | 79 |
| Argentina | 11 |
| Sweden | 7 |
| France | 4 |
| Brazil | 3 |
| Denmark | 3 |
| Switzerland | 3 |
| Uruguay | 3 |
| Austria | 2 |
| Hungary | 2 |
| Netherlands | 2 |
| Ukraine | 2 |
| Bosnia and Herzegovina | 1 |
| England | 1 |
| Germany | 1 |
| Wales | 1 |
| Portugal | 1 |
| Nigeria | 1 |

== See also ==
- List of Serie A players with 100 or more goals
- Pichichi Trophy
- Premier League Golden Boot
- List of Bundesliga top scorers by season
- List of La Liga top scorers
- European Golden Shoe
- List of Ligue 1 top scorers
- List of Süper Lig top scorers
