= Norman Victor Leaver =

English footballer (born 1876)

Personal information
- Date of birth: 18 January 1876
- Place of birth: London, England
- Date of death: 14 December 1919 (aged 43)
- Place of death: London, England
- Position: Winger

Senior career*
Years	Team	Apps	(Gls)
1897–1899	Genoa		
- * Club domestic league appearances and goals

Norman Victor Leaver (18 January 1876 – 14 December 1919) was an English footballer, who played as a winger.

Born in London's Shepherd's Bush district, he was the son of coal merchants.

Also known as Robert Al Leaver, he won the first edition of the Italian Football Championship with Genoa, and was also the tournament's top scorer.

== Honours ==
Genoa

- Italian Football Championship: 1898, 1899

Individual

- Capocannoniere: 1898 (joint with Edoardo Bosio – 2 goals)
