= Hans Kämpfer =

English footballer (born 1876)

Hans Rudolf Kämpfer
Personal information
- Date of birth: 18 March 1885
- Place of birth: Goldiwil, Switzerland
- Date of death: 12 December 1959 (aged 74)
- Place of death: Bern, Switzerland
- Position: Forward

Senior career*
| Years | Team | Apps | (Gls) |
| 1904–1905 | Montriond Lausanne | | |
| 1905–1906 | Juventus | | |
| 1906–1907 | Torino | 5 | (7) |
| 1907–1910 | Young Boys | | |

International career
| 1905–1909 | Switzerland | 4 | (2) |
- * Club domestic league appearances and goals

Hans Rudolf Kämpfer (18 March 1885 – 12 December 1959) was a Swiss footballer, who played as a forward.

Throughout his career, he played for Montriond Lausanne (currently Lausanne-Sport), Juventus, Torino, and Young Boys.

Kämpfer is the player who has scored the most goals in a Derby della Mole; on 3 February 1907, he netted four goals against Juventus, who were beaten 4–1.

He made four appearances for Switzerland, scoring two goals.

== Honours ==
Torino

- Italian Football Championship runner-up: 1907

Young Boys

- Swiss Football League: 1908–09, 1909–10

Individual

- Capocannoniere: 1907
