= Mario Cagliani =

Italian footballer

Personal information
- Position: Midfielder

Senior career*
Years	Team	Apps	(Gls)
1908–1911	US Milanese		
- * Club domestic league appearances and goals

Mario Cagliani was an Italian footballer, who played as a midfielder.

He played for US Milanese from 1908 to 1911. In the 1908 season, Cagliani and his club finished second in the final round, behind champions Pro Vercelli. They repeated the same result the following season, finishing behind the side from Vercelli again.

== Honours ==
US Milanese

- Italian Football Championship runner-up: 1908, 1909

Individual

- Capocannoniere: 1908
