= Roger Piérard =

Belgian footballer

Personal information
- Date of birth: 28 August 1887

International career
Years	Team	Apps	(Gls)
1906–1909	Belgium	8	(0)

Roger Piérard (born 28 August 1887, date of death unknown) was a Belgian footballer. He played in eight matches for the Belgium national football team from 1906 to 1909.
