= Enea Zuffi =

Italian footballer (1891-1968)

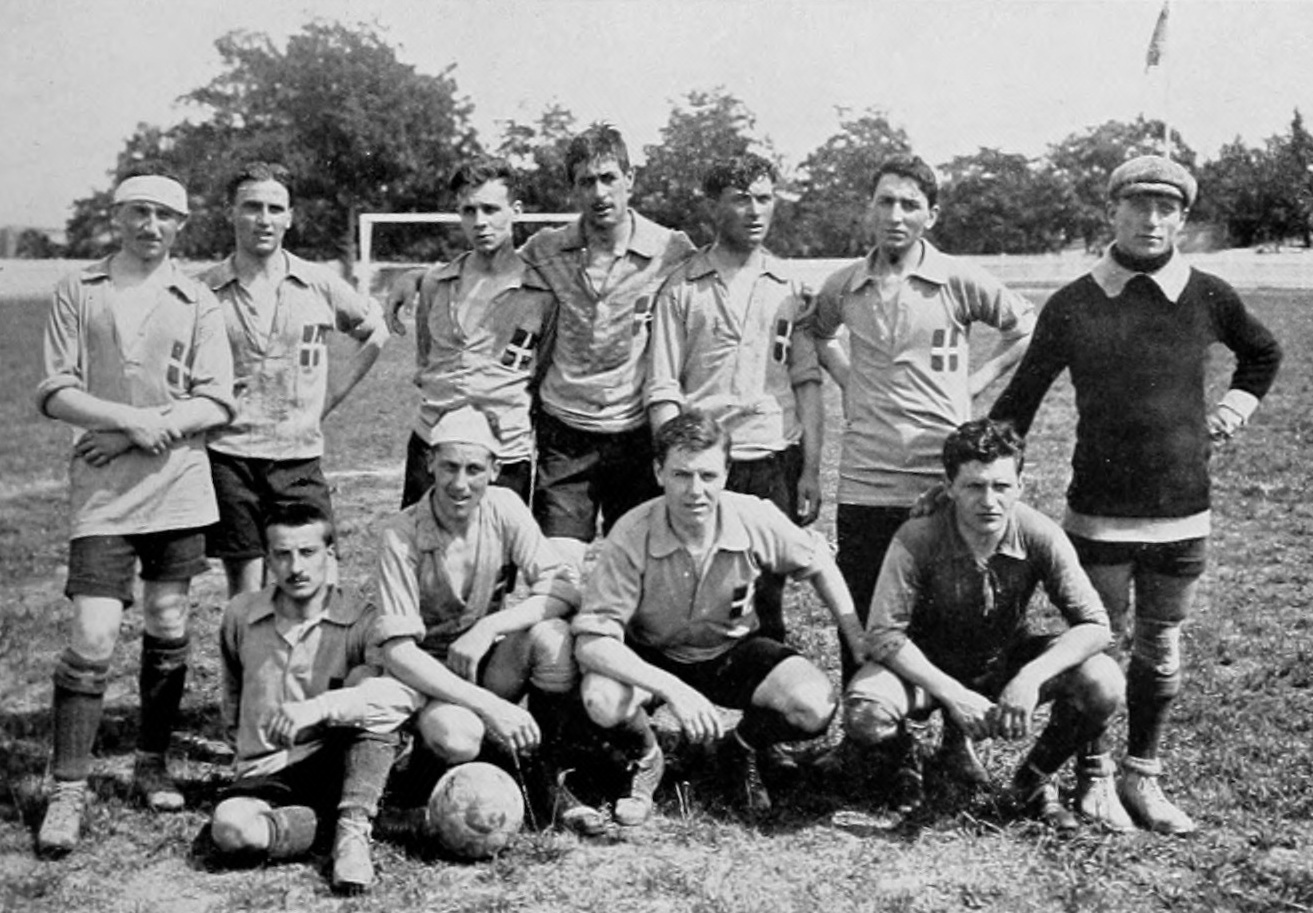
- The Italy squad at the 1912 Olympics. Zuffi is front, second from right.

Personal information
- Date of birth: 27 December 1889
- Place of birth: Turin, Italy
- Date of death: 14 July 1968 (aged 76)
- Position: Forward

Senior career*
Years	Team	Apps	(Gls)
1908–1910	Torino	9	(1)
1910–1912	Juventus	21	(0)
1912–1913	Torino	5	(0)

International career
1912	Italy	2	(0)
- * Club domestic league appearances and goals

Enea Zuffi (Italian pronunciation: [eˈnɛːa dˈdzuffi]; 27 December 1889 – 14 July 1968) was an Italian footballer who played as a forward and midfielder.

== Biography ==
Zuffi was born in Turin, Italy, on 27 December 1889 to mother Alice Drake and father Enea Zuffi. At a club level, he played for both teams from his hometown, Torino F.C. and Juventus F.C. He played nine games with Torino from 1908 to 1910 and scored one goal, and played twenty-one games with Juventus from 1910 to 1912. He then returned to Torino for the 1912-1913 season, appearing in five games. In 1909, Zuffi was a member of the Torino XI that participated in the 1909 Sir Thomas Lipton Trophy, regarded by many as the first European club trophy. In the tournament, he scored the winning goal of a 2-1 victory over Sportfreunde Stuttgart to secure his team a third-place finish.

In 1912, Zuffi was a member of the Italy national squad that played at the 1912 Summer Olympics. He was present for three games, playing in two of them. He made his debut on 29 June, in a 2-3 loss to Finland; they would dispute the consolation tournament, where he sat on the bench against Sweden on 1 July as Italy won 1-0. On 3 July, he played against Austria in yet another loss (1-5).

Zuffi died on 14 July 1968 at the age of 76.
