= Albert Weber (Swiss footballer) =

Swiss footballer

Senior career*
Years	Team	Apps	(Gls)
1887–1891	Torino Football & Cricket Club		
1891–1899	Internazionale Torino		
1890–1904	Torinese		
- * Club domestic league appearances and goals

Albert Weber
Domestic
Years	League	Role
1901	Italian Football Championship	Referee

Albert Weber was a Swiss footballer and referee.

He played for Torino Football & Cricket Club from the year of its foundation in 1887, a club that would merge with Nobili Torino in 1891 to form Internazionale Torino.

With Internazionale Torino, he participated in the inaugural Italian football championship, which they lost in the final to Genoa.

In 1901, he refereed the championship final between Genoa and Milan, played on 5 May and ending 0–3 in favour of the Rossoneri.

== Honours ==
Internazionale Torino

- Italian Football Championship runner-up: 1898

Individual

- Capocannoniere: 1899
