= Eugenio Mosso =

Argentinian-born Italian footballer (1895–1961)

Personal information
- Full name: Eugenio Mosso
- Date of birth: 10 August 1895
- Place of birth: Mendoza, Argentina
- Date of death: 6 August 1961 (aged 65)
- Place of death: Mendoza, Argentina
- Position: Forward

Senior career*
Years	Team	Apps	(Gls)
1912–1925	Torino	60	(47)

International career
1914	Italy	1	(0)
- * Club domestic league appearances and goals

Eugenio Mosso (Italian pronunciation: [euˈdʒɛːnjo ˈmɔsso]; 10 August 1895 – 6 August 1961) was an Argentine-born Italian footballer who played as a forward. On 5 April 1914, he represented the Italy national football team on the occasion of a friendly match against Switzerland in a 1–1 away draw.
