= Max Tobias =

Belgian footballer

Personal information
- Full name: Maurice Tobias
- Date of birth: 1885
- Place of birth: Belgium
- Date of death: after 1953
- Position: Midfielder

Senior career*
Years	Team	Apps	(Gls)
1901–1902	Racing Bruxelles		
1902–1909	Union Saint-Gilloise		
1909–1910	Mechelen		
1910–1911	Milan	16	(11)
1911–1912	Mechelen		
1912–1913	Gent		

International career
1904–1908	Belgium	7	(0)
- * Club domestic league appearances and goals

Maurice "Max" Tobias (1885 – after 1953) was a Belgian professional footballer who played as a midfielder.

== Honours ==
=== Club ===
Union Saint-Gilloise

- First Division (5): 1903–04, 1904–05, 1905–06, 1906–07, 1908–09

Sporting positions
Preceded by Guido Moda	Milan captain 1910–1911	Succeeded by Giuseppe Rizzi
