= Vincenzo Fresia =

Italian footballer and manager

Personal information
- Full name: Vincenzo Fresia
- Date of birth: 2 October 1888
- Place of birth: Vercelli, Italy
- Date of death: 1946 (aged 57–58)
- Place of death: Italy
- Position: Forward

Senior career*
Years	Team	Apps	(Gls)
1908–1911	Pro Vercelli	38	(12)
1911	Torino	1	(?)
1912–1914	Pro Vercelli	17	(7)
Total		56	(19+)

International career
1913	Italy	1	(0)

Managerial career
- 1920–1926: Ravenna
- 1936–1938: Prato
- 1938–1939: Grosseto
- 1939–1940: Carrarese
- 1941–1942: Molfetta Sportiva
- * Club domestic league appearances and goals

Vincenzo Fresia (Italian pronunciation: [vinˈtʃɛntso ˈfrɛːzja]; 2 October 1888 – 1946) was an Italian footballer and manager who played as a forward and made one appearance for the Italy national team.

== Career ==
Fresia played the majority of his club career at Pro Vercelli, except for a brief spell at Torino in which he made one appearance. He made his only international appearance for Italy on 15 June 1913 in a friendly match against Austria. The match, which was played in Vienna, finished as a 0–2 loss for Italy.

Following his playing career, Fresia began his career as a manager. He coached Ravenna, Prato, Grosseto, Carrarese and Molfetta Sportiva.

== Career statistics ==
=== International ===
Italy
Year	Apps	Goals
1913	1	0
Total	1	0
