= Eugenio Canfari =

Italian sporting director (1878–1962)

- Born: 16 October 1878; Genoa, Italy
- Died: 23 March 1962 (aged 84); Turin, Italy
- Occupation: Sporting director
- Known for: Co-founding of Juventus FC

Eugenio Canfari (16 October 1878 – 23 March 1962) was an early Italian sporting director. He was one of the thirteen men who founded Juventus in 1897 and the club's first-ever president. His brother Enrico Canfari was also a founding member of Juventus, and was the second president, although he never played in the Italian Football Championship with Enrico and Juventus.

== Sources ==
- Turco, F.; Savasta, V. (2014), Il Calcio dimenticato. Toro, Genoa, Milan, Juve, il pallone dei pionieri (in Italian), Editori Internazionali Riuniti, ISBN 978-88-359-9419-0
