= Carlo Corna =

Italian footballer and manager (1891-1964)

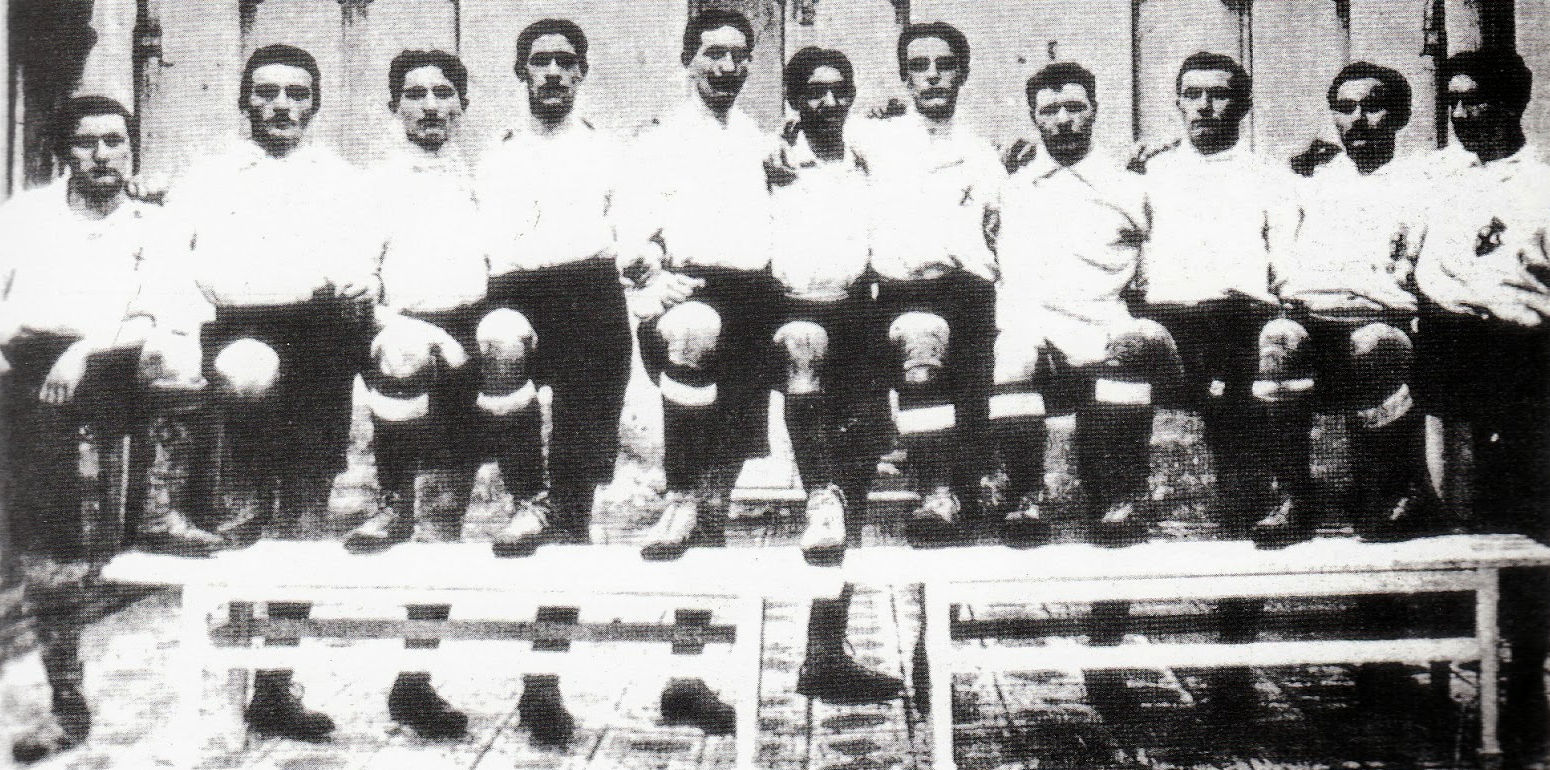
- Pro Vercelli's line-up in the 1909 season. Corna is the last player on the right.

Personal information
- Date of birth: 20 August 1891
- Place of birth: Vercelli, Italy
- Date of death: 17 June 1964 (aged 72)
- Position: Striker

Senior career*
Years	Team	Apps	(Gls)
1909–1921	Pro Vercelli	115	(43)

International career
1911–1915	Italy	8	(0)

Managerial career
- 1923–1924: Faenza
- 1928–1933: Fiorenzuola
- 1933–1938: Piacenza
- 1946–1947: Fiorenzuola
- * Club domestic league appearances and goals

Carlo Corna (Italian pronunciation: [ˈkarlo ˈkɔrna]; 20 August 1891 – 17 June 1964) was an Italian former professional footballer and manager who played as a striker.

He spent his entire career playing for Pro Vercelli, winning five scudetto.

Corna won 8 caps with the Italy national football team.

He was manager of Faenza, Fiorenzuola, and Piacenza.

== Honours ==
=== Player ===
Pro Vercelli

- Serie A: 1909, 1910–11, 1911–12, 1912–13, 1920–21
