= Max Laich =

Swiss football referee

Personal information
- Full name: Max Laich
- Place of birth: Switzerland
- Position: Midfielder

Senior career*
Years	Team	Apps	(Gls)
1908–1909	Milan	2	(1)
Total		2	(1)
- * Club domestic league appearances and goals

Max Laich
Domestic
Years	League	Role
1908–10	Prima Categoria	Referee

Max Laich (fl. 1908–1910) was a Swiss professional footballer, who played as a midfielder, and football referee. He joined Italian club Milan in 1908. However, his footballing career was halted by a serious leg injury, which he suffered during an exhibition game against Internazionale, on 20 May 1909.
