= Oscar Engler =

Swiss footballer (born 1889)

Personal information
- Full name: Oscar Engler
- Date of birth: January 29, 1889
- Place of birth: San Gallo, Switzerland
- Position: Defender

Senior career*
Years	Team	Apps	(Gls)
19??	FC St. Gallen	?	(?)
1909	Torino	10	(?)
1909–1915	Internazionale	102	(18)
- * Club domestic league appearances and goals

Oscar Engler (29 January 1889 – ?) was a Swiss football player.
