= Stadio di Corso Sebastopoli =

Football stadium in Turin, Italy

- Interactive map of Stadio di Corso Sebastopoli
- Full name: Stadio di Corso Sebastopoli
- Location: Turin, Italy
- Owner: Foot-Ball Club Juventus
- Operator: Juventus
- Capacity: 10,000

Construction
- Opened: 1908
- Closed: 1922
- Demolished: 1922

Tenant
- Foot-Ball Club Juventus

Stadio di Corso Sebastopoli was a multi-use stadium in Turin, Italy. It was initially used as the stadium for Foot-Ball Club Juventus matches. It was replaced by the Stadio di Corso Marsiglia in 1963. The capacity of the stadium was 10,000 spectators.
