= Umberto Scotti =

Italian footballer

Personal information
- Full name: Umberto Scotti
- Date of birth: 27 January 1885
- Place of birth: Milan, Italy
- Position: Striker

Senior career*
Years	Team	Apps	(Gls)
1903–1904	A.C. Milan	3	(1)
- * Club domestic league appearances and goals

Umberto Scotti, a striker born in Ticino Oriano on 27 January 1885, was one of the first players to play for the Italian side A.C. Milan; he cut off his career shortly after a loss to Juventus FC
