= Edoardo Mariani =

Italian footballer (1893-1956)

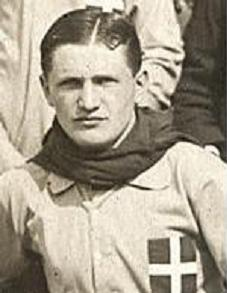

Personal information
- Date of birth: 5 March 1893
- Place of birth: Milan, Italy
- Date of death: 7 January 1956 (aged 62)
- Place of death: Pisa, Italy
- Position: Forward

Senior career*
Years	Team	Apps	(Gls)
1909–1910	Milan	14	(3)
1910–1915	Genoa	87	(13)
1918–1920	Milan	23	(6)
1920–1924	Genoa	53	(5)
1924–1925	Lazio	4	(0)
1925–1927	Savona	21	(0)

International career
1912	Italy	4	(0)
- * Club domestic league appearances and goals

Edoardo Mariani (Italian pronunciation: [edoˈardo maˈrjaːni]; 5 March 1893 – 7 January 1956) was an Italian footballer who played as a left winger.

== International career ==
Mariani made four appearances for Italy, all of which came in 1912. He became the youngest forward to start a match for Italy, when he made his debut against France, starting in a 3–4 friendly loss in Turin on 17 March 1912, at the age of 19 years and 12 days. This record was later bettered by Leopoldo Conti, who made his international debut on 28 March 1920, starting in a 3–0 friendly away loss to Switzerland, at the age of 18 years, 351 days. Mariani is either the third or fourth-youngest player ever to start a match for Italy, behind only Conti, Eugenio Mosso, and possibly Rodolfo Gavinelli. Mosso made his only international appearance for Italy on 5 April 1914, starting in a 1–1 friendly away draw against Switzerland, at the age of 18 years, 238 days. Gavinelli, on the other hand, made his only international appearance for Italy on 9 April 1911, starting in a 2–2 friendly away draw against France, at the age of either 20 years, 98 days, or 16 years, 98 days, as it is not known officially whether he was born on 1 January in 1891 or 1895. He later competed for Italy in the men's football tournament at the 1912 Summer Olympics. Mariani made 3 appearances for Italy at the 1912 Summer Olympics, including his final international appearance, which came in a 5–1 defeat to Austria on 3 July.
