= Carlo Capra =

Italian footballer (1889-1966)

Personal information
- Date of birth: 21 September 1889
- Place of birth: Strambino, Italy
- Date of death: 19 August 1966 (aged 76)
- Position: Defender

Senior career*
Years	Team	Apps	(Gls)
1909–1916	Torino	77	(9)
1919–1920	Torino	12	(0)
1920–1921	Pro Patria		

International career
1915	Italy	1	(0)
- * Club domestic league appearances and goals

Carlo Capra (Italian pronunciation: [ˈkarlo ˈkaːpra]; 21 September 1889, – 19 August 1966) was an Italian professional footballer who played as a defender.

== International career ==
Capra made his only appearance for the Italy national football team on 31 January 1915 in a game against Switzerland.

== Personal life ==
Capra's older brother Giovanni Capra also played football professionally. To distinguish them, Giovanni was referred to as Capra I and Carlo as Capra II.
