= Gustavo Carrer =

Italian footballer and manager

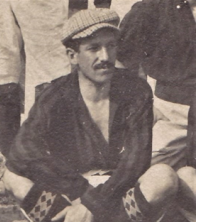

Personal information
- Date of birth: 21 May 1885
- Place of birth: Riva del Garda, Italy
- Date of death: 18 February 1968 (aged 82)
- Place of death: Solbiate Olona, Italy
- Position: Striker

Senior career*
Years	Team	Apps	(Gls)
1904–1907	Milan	2	(0)
1908–1909	Milan (B team)	11	(?)
1909–1912	Milan	38	(6)
1912–1913	Internazionale	6	(0)
1913–1915	Como	11	(4)
1920–1921	Pro Sesto		

International career
1911	Italy	2	(1)

Managerial career
- 1919–1920: Como
- 1926–1927: Como
- * Club domestic league appearances and goals

Gustavo Carrer (Italian pronunciation: [ɡuˈstaːvo karˈrɛr]; 21 May 1885 – 18 February 1968) was an Italian professional football player and manager who played as a forward.

He made his debut for the Italy national football team on 7 May 1911, scoring a goal in a 2–2 home draw against Switzerland. He collected another appearance for Italy against the same opponent later that year.
