= Guido Pedroni =

Italian footballer and football referee

Personal information
- Full name: Guido Pedroni
- Date of birth: 21 August 1883
- Place of birth: Milan, Italy
- Date of death: 6 February 1964 (aged 80)
- Place of death: Milan, Italy
- Height: 1.62 m (5 ft 4 in)
- Position: Right winger

Senior career*
Years	Team	Apps	(Gls)
1903–1906	Milan	11	(3)
Total		11	(3)
- * Club domestic league appearances and goals

Guido Pedroni
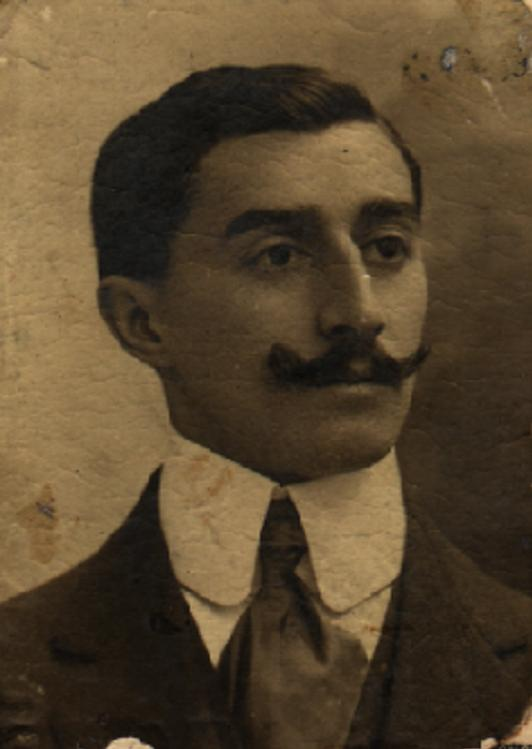

Domestic
Years	League	Role
1909–10	Prima Categoria	Referee

Guido Pedroni (21 August 1883 – 6 February 1964) was an Italian professional footballer, who played as a forward, and football referee.

== Honours ==
=== Club ===
Milan

- Italian Football Championship: 1906

=== Individual ===
- Capocannoniere: 1906 (3 goals)
