= Gerolamo Radice =

Italian footballer and football referee

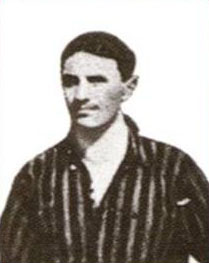

Personal information
- Full name: Gerolamo Radice
- Date of birth: 11 November 1883
- Place of birth: Milan, Italy
- Date of death: 19 November 1948 (aged 65)
- Place of death: Milan, Italy
- Position: Goalkeeper

Senior career*
Years	Team	Apps	(Gls)
1906–1909	Milan	8	(0)
Total		8	(0)
Refereeing career
Domestic
Years	League	Role
1908–13	Prima Categoria	Referee
1914–15	Prima Categoria	Referee
- * Club domestic league appearances and goals

Gerolamo Radice (11 November 1883 – 19 November 1948) was an Italian professional footballer, who played as a goalkeeper, and football referee.

== Honours ==
=== Club ===
- Milan F.B.C.C.
  - Prima Categoria: 1907

Sporting positions
Preceded by Herbert Kilpin	Milan captain 1908–1909	Succeeded by Guido Moda
