= Enrico Canfari =

Italian footballer and sorting director (1877-1915)

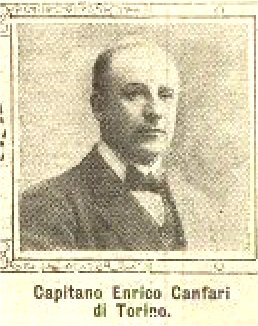

Personal information
- Full name: Enrico Francesco Canfari
- Date of birth: 16 April 1877
- Place of birth: Genoa, Italy
- Date of death: 22 October 1915 (aged 38)
- Place of death: Turin, Italy
- Position: Forward

Senior career*
Years	Team	Apps	(Gls)
1900–1903	Juventus	11	(1)
1903–1904	A.C. Milan	3	(0)
- * Club domestic league appearances and goals

Enrico Canfari (16 April 1877 – 22 October 1915) was an Italian footballer who played as a forward for Juventus and A.C. Milan, and later sporting director of Juventus.

== Career ==
Canfari was born on 16 April 1877 in Genoa. His father was later owner of a bicycle shop in Turin. In 1897 Canfari and his younger brother Eugenio belonged to a group of 13 students of the Turin Massimo d'Azeglio Grammar School, which founded the football club Juventus on 1 November 1897. In 1898 he succeeded his brother as president of the club until 1901.

With Juve Canfari participated in the Italian football championships 1900 to 1903. Because of his close links with A.C. Milan, Canfari joined A.C. Milan in 1903.

After his football career Canfari studied chemistry and made numerous trips to England to show his knowledge of football rules.

Enrico Canfari fell in World War I, during the Third Battle of the Isonzo, in which he participated as a volunteer in the rank of captain. He died on 22 October 1915 at the age of 38 at the Monte San Michele at the Isonzo river.
