= 1907 Prima Categoria =

10th season of top-tier Italian football

Prima Categoria
- Season: 1906–07
- Champions: Milan; 3rd title
- Matches played: 12
- Goals scored: 36 (3 per match)

The 1907 Prima Categoria was the tenth edition of the Italian Football Championship and the fourth since the re-brand to Prima Categoria. The Italian football championship was won that year for the third time by AC Milan, retaining their title from the previous year.

== Format ==
Like 1905, 2 clubs from each of the 3 Northern Italian regions of Liguria, Lombardy and Piedmont took part. The winners of the 3 regional play offs contested a round robin final stage.

== Qualifications ==
=== Piedmont ===
Played on 13 January and 3 February

Team 1	Agg.	Team 2	1st leg	2nd leg
Torino	6–2	Juventus	2–1	4–1

=== Liguria ===
Played on 13 January and 3 February

Team 1	Agg.	Team 2	1st leg	2nd leg
Andrea Doria	4–2	Genoa	1–1	3–1

=== Lombardy ===
Played on 13 January and 3 February

Team 1	Agg.	Team 2	1st leg	2nd leg
Milan	7–0	US Milanese	6–0	1–0

== Final round ==
=== Final classification ===
Pos	Team	Pld	W	D	L	GF	GA	GD	Pts	Qualification
1	Milan (C)	4	2	2	0	10	3	+7	6	Champions
2	Torino	4	1	3	0	6	3	+3	5	
3	Andrea Doria	4	0	1	3	0	10	−10	1	

Source: Panini
(C) Champions

=== Results ===
Team 1	Score	Team 2
Andrea Doria	0–0	Torino
Torino	1–1	Milan
Milan	5–0	Andrea Doria
Milan	2–2	Torino
Andrea Doria	0–2	Milan
Torino	2–0 (forfeit)	Andrea Doria

== References and sources ==
- Almanacco Illustrato del Calcio – La Storia 1898–2004, Panini Edizioni, Modena, September 2005
