= Giuseppe Rizzi =

Italian footballer (1886–1960)

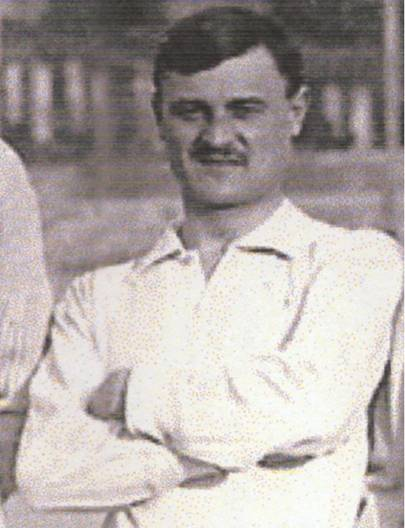

Personal information
- Full name: Giuseppe Rizzi
- Date of birth: 20 January 1886
- Place of birth: Verona, Kingdom of Italy
- Date of death: 29 June 1960 (aged 74)
- Place of death: Milan, Italy
- Height: 1.67 m (5 ft 5 1/2 in)
- Position: Midfielder

Youth career
- Mediolanum

Senior career*
| Years | Team | Apps | (Gls) |
| 1904–1907 | Milan | 7 | (3) |
| 1908 | Ausonia Reserves | 1 | (0) |
| 1909–1910 | Ausonia | 14 | (3) |
| 1910–1913 | Milan | 42 | (16) |
| 1913–1915 | Internazionale | 20 | (0) |
| Total | | 82 | (22) |

International career
| 1910–1913 | Italy | 4 | (2) |
- * Club domestic league appearances and goals

Giuseppe Rizzi (Italian pronunciation: [dʒuˈzɛppe ˈrittsi]; 20 January 1886 – 20 June 1960) was an Italian professional footballer, who played as a midfielder. He represented the Italy national football team four times, the first being Italy's first ever match on 15 May 1910, the occasion of a friendly match against France in a 6–2 home win, also scoring a goal.

Sporting positions
| Preceded by Max Tobias | Milan captain 1911–1913 | Succeeded by Louis Van Hege |
