= Umberto Malvano =

Italian footballer

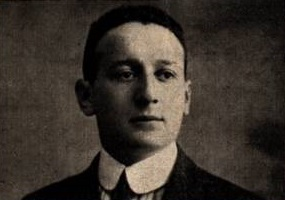

Personal information
- Full name: Umberto Malvano
- Date of birth: 17 July 1884
- Place of birth: Turin, Italy
- Position: Striker

Senior career*
Years	Team	Apps	(Gls)
1897–04	Juventus	16	(8)
1905–06	A.C. Milan	4	(2)
- * Club domestic league appearances and goals

Umberto Malvano (17 July 1884 – 15 September 1971) was an early Italian football player from Turin. He was one of the thirteen men who founded Juventus in 1897. After several years of playing as a striker for Juventus, he moved to rivals AC Milan, where he won the 1906 Italian Football Championship.

== Honours ==
Milan

- Italian Football Championship: 1906

Individual

- Capocannoniere: 1901, 1903
