= Guido Moda =

Italian footballer and manager

Personal information
- Full name: Guido Moda
- Date of birth: 11 July 1885
- Place of birth: Piavon di Oderzo, Italy
- Date of death: 5 November 1957 (aged 72)
- Place of death: Bergamo, Italy
- Position: Defender

Senior career*
Years	Team	Apps	(Gls)
1903–1908	Milan	11	(0)
1908–1909	Kadıköy		
1909–1912	Milan	16	(0)

Managerial career
- 1919–1921: Milan
- 1926: Milan
- * Club domestic league appearances and goals

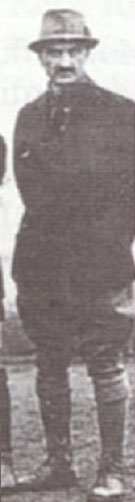
Guido Moda

Guido Moda (11 July 1885 – 5 November 1957) was an Italian professional footballer, who played as a defender, and football manager.

== Honours ==
=== Club ===
- Milan F.B.C.C.
  - Prima Categoria: 1906, 1907

Sporting positions
Preceded by Gerolamo Radice	Milan captain 1909–1910	Succeeded by Max Tobias
