= List of AC Milan records and statistics =

Associazione Calcio Milan are an Italian professional football club based in Milan, Lombardy. The club was founded as Milan Foot-Ball and Cricket Club in 1899 and has competed in the Italian football league since the following year. Milan currently play in Serie A, the top tier of Italian football. They have been out of the top tier in only two seasons since the establishment of the Serie A as the single division top tier. They have also been involved in European football ever since they became the first Italian club to enter the European Cup in 1955.

This list encompasses the major honours won by Milan, records set by the club, its managers and its players. The player records section includes details of the club's leading goalscorers and those who have made most appearances in first-team competitions. It also records notable achievements by Milan players on the international stage.

The club currently has the record for the third most Italian top-flight titles (Scudetti) with 19, behind cross-city rivals Inter Milan 21 and Juventus' 36. They also hold the record for the most European Cup victories by an Italian team, winning the competition seven times. Furthermore, in the 1991–92 season Milan became the first team to win the Serie A title without losing a single game. The club's record appearance maker is Paolo Maldini, who has made 902 official appearances between 1985 and 2009. Gunnar Nordahl is the club's record goalscorer, scoring 221 goals during his Milan career.

== Honours ==
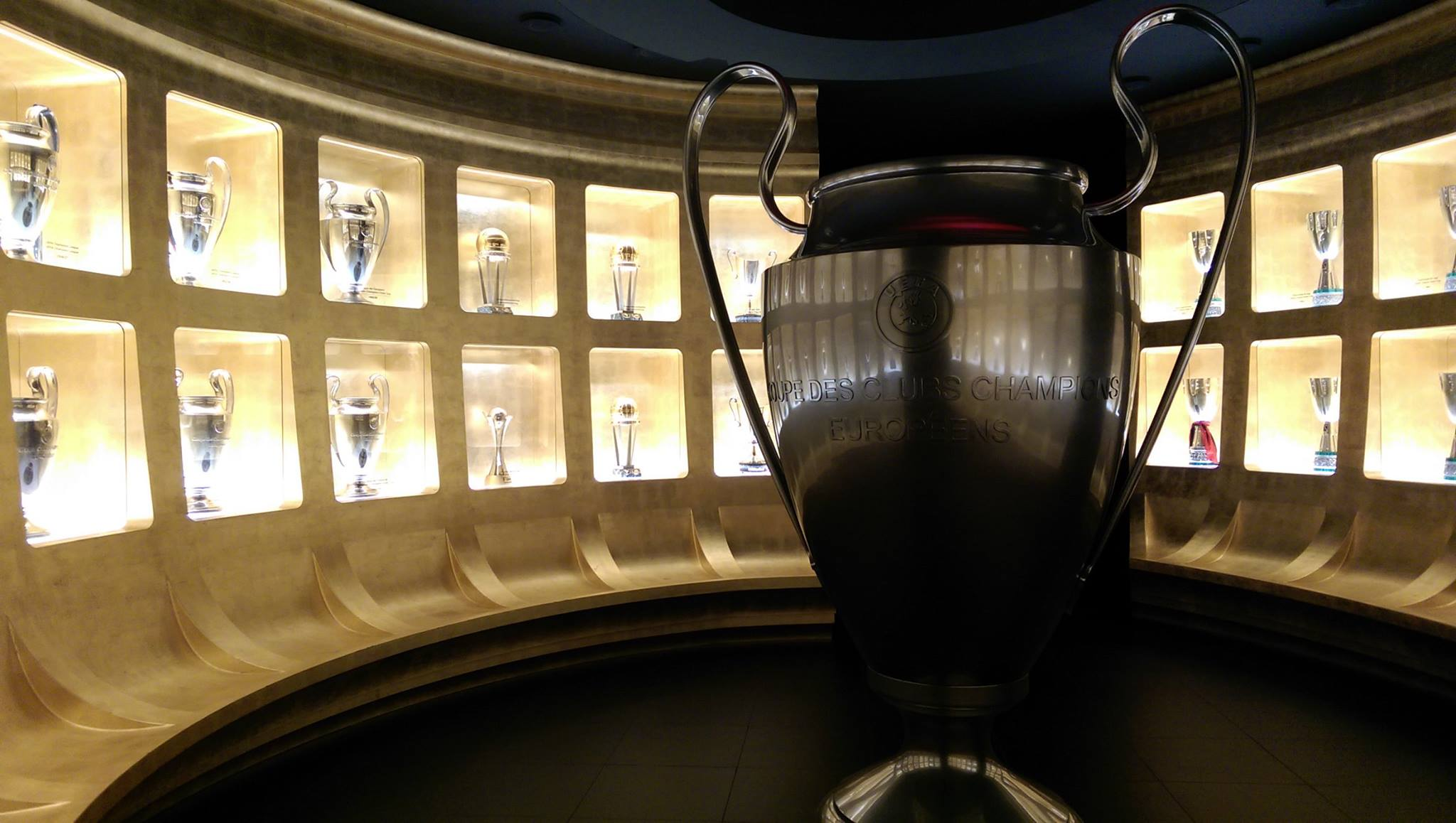
A partial view of the AC Milan's trophy room at the club's museum in Casa Milan

Milan have won honours both domestically and in European cup competitions. They have won the Scudetto nineteen times, the Coppa Italia five times and the Supercoppa Italiana seven times. They won their first league title in their second season, winning the 1901 Italian Football Championship, while their most recent success came in 2022, when they won their 19th Scudetto. Internationally, they are the most successful Italian club, with 18 trophies which include seven UEFA Champions League titles, five UEFA Super Cups, two European Cup Winners' Cups, three Intercontinental Cups and one FIFA Club World Cup.

=== Domestic ===
==== League ====
Italian Football Championship / Serie A (first division):

- Winners (19): 1901, 1906, 1907, 1950–51, 1954–55, 1956–57, 1958–59, 1961–62, 1967–68, 1978–79, 1987–88, 1991–92, 1992–93, 1993–94, 1995–96, 1998–99, 2003–04, 2010–11, 2021–22

- Runners-up (17): 1902, 1947–48, 1949–50, 1951–52, 1955–56, 1960–61, 1964–65, 1968–69, 1970–71, 1971–72, 1972–73, 1989–90, 1990–91, 2004–05, 2011–12, 2020–21, 2023–24

Serie B (second division):

- Winners (2): 1980–81, 1982–83

==== Cups ====
Coppa Italia:

- Winners (5): 1966–67, 1971–72, 1972–73, 1976–77, 2002–03
- Runners-up (10): 1941–42, 1967–68, 1970–71, 1974–75, 1984–85, 1989–90, 1997–98, 2015–16, 2017–18, 2024–25

Supercoppa Italiana:

- Winners (8): 1988, 1992, 1993, 1994, 2004, 2011, 2016, 2024
- Runners-up (5): 1996, 1999, 2003, 2018, 2022

=== International ===
European Cup/UEFA Champions League:

- Winners (7): 1962–63, 1968–69, 1988–89, 1989–90, 1993–94, 2002–03, 2006–07
- Runners-up (4): 1957–58, 1992–93, 1994–95, 2004–05

European Cup Winners' Cup:

- Winners (2): 1967–68, 1972–73
- Runners-up (1): 1973–74

European Super Cup/UEFA Super Cup:

- Winners (5): 1989, 1990, 1994, 2003, 2007
- Runners-up (2): 1973, 1993

Intercontinental Cup:

- Winners (3): 1969, 1989, 1990
- Runners-up (4): 1963, 1993, 1994, 2003

FIFA Club World Cup:

- Winners (1): 2007

Latin Cup:

- Winners (2): 1951, 1956
- Runners-up (1): 1953

Mitropa Cup:

- Winners (1): 1982

== Club records ==
=== Divisional movements ===
Series	Years	Last	Promotions	Relegations
A	93	2026–27	—	▼2 (1980, 1982)
B	2	1982–83	▲2 (1981, 1983)	never
95 years of professional football in Italy since 1929
Founding member of the Football League’s First Division in 1921

=== Serie A ===
- Longest unbeaten run: 58 games (record across the five main European domestic leagues)
- Longest unbeaten run in away games: 38 games
- League title won with the fewest defeats: 0, in 1991–92 Serie A, (record shared with Juventus)
- Most away games wins in a single Serie A season: 16 (out of 19) in 2020–21 Serie A
- Most consecutive Serie A games with at least 2 goals scored: 17
- Fewest goals conceded in home games in a single Serie A season: 2 in 15 games, in 1968–69 Serie A (record shared with Como)
- Most Serie A top scorer titles: 17

=== International cups ===
- Most European Cups/Champions League wins without losing a game: 2, in 1988-89 and 1993–94
- Champions League winner with fewest goals conceded: 2, in 1993-94 (record shared with Aston Villa)
- Lowest ratio of goals conceded per game in a single Champions League season: 0.16 in 1993–94
- Most consecutive Champions League finals appearances: 3, from 1992–93 to 1994-95 (record shared with Juventus and Real Madrid)
- Highest goal difference win in a Champions League final: 4, in 1988-89 and 1993-94 (record shared with Real Madrid and Bayern Munich, which, however, achieved this result only once)
- First club to have won all games in a Champions League group stage (in 1992–93)
- Fewest goals conceded in a Champions League group stage: 1, in 1992-93 (record shared with 10 other teams)
- Most Intercontinental Cup wins: 3, in 1969, 1989 and 1990 (record shared with Real Madrid, Boca Juniors, Peñarol and Nacional)
- Most Intercontinental Cup finals: 7, in 1963, 1969, 1989, 1990, 1993, 1994 and 2003

=== Matches ===
==== Firsts ====
- First match: Milan 2–0 SEF Mediolanum, friendly match (Medaglia del Re), 11 March 1900
- First league match: Torinese 3–0 Milan, 1900 Italian Football Championship, 15 April 1900
- First Coppa Italia match: Milan 7–1 Rivalorese, 1926–27 Coppa Italia, second round, 6 January 1927
- First Serie A match: Milan 4–1 Brescia, 1929–30 Serie A, 6 October 1929
- First European match: Ripensia Timișoara 3–0 Milan, 1938 Mitropa Cup, first round, 26 June 1938
- First UEFA Champions League/European Cup match: Milan 3–4 Saarbrücken, 1955–56 European Cup, first round, 1 November 1955

==== In a season ====
- Most official matches played in a season: 61 matches (2002–03)
- Fewest official matches played in a season: 1 match (1899–1900, 1901–02 and 1902–03)
- Most official matches won in a season: 36 matches (2004–05 and 2005–06)
- Most official matches won in a season (Serie A): 28 matches (2005–06)
  - Most league home wins in a season (Serie A): 17 matches (2005–06)
  - Most league away wins in a season (Serie A): 16 matches (2020–21)
- Fewest official matches won in a season (Serie A): 5 matches (1976–77)
- Most official matches drawn in a season: 21 matches (1967–68)
- Most official matches drawn in a season (Serie A): 17 matches (1976–77)
- Fewest official matches drawn in a season (Serie A): 3 matches (1949–50)
- Most official matches lost in a season: 17 matches (1973–74, 1996–97 and 2013–14)
- Most official matches lost in a season (Serie A): 15 matches (1930–31)
- Fewest games lost in a season in all competitions: 0 matches (in 1900–01) and 1906–07)
- Fewest official matches lost in a season (Serie A): 0 (1991–92)

==== Record wins ====
- Record win: 13–0 against Audax Modena, Prima Categoria, 4 October 1914
- Record away win: 10–0 against Ausonia, Prima Categoria, 21 October 1919
- Record Serie A win: 9–0 against Palermo, 18 February 1951
- Record Serie A away win: 8–0 against Genoa, 5 June 1955
- Record Coppa Italia win: 8–1 against Padova, 13 September 1958
- Record Coppa Italia away win: 5–0 against Como, 8 June 1958
- Record win in European competitions: 8–0 against Union Luxembourg, European Cup, 12 September 1962
- Record away win in European competitions:
  - 6–0 against Union Luxembourg, European Cup, 19 September 1962
  - 6–0 against Copenhagen, Champions League, 20 October 1993

==== Record defeats ====
- Record (home) defeat: 0–8 against Bologna, Prima Divisione, 5 November 1922
- Record away defeat:
  - 0–6 against Juventus, Prima Divisione, 25 October 1925
  - 0–6 against Ajax, European Super Cup, 16 January 1974
- Record-scoring defeat: 2–8 against Juventus, Divisione Nazionale, 10 July 1927
- Record Serie A (away) defeat:
  - 1–6 against Alessandria, 26 January 1936
  - 0–5 against Roma, 3 May 1998
  - 0–5 against Atalanta, 22 December 2019
- Record Serie A home defeat: 1–6 against Juventus, 6 April 1997
- Record Coppa Italia (away) defeat:
  - 0–5 against Fiorentina, 13 April 1940
  - 0–5 against Torino, 16 May 1943
- Record Coppa Italia home defeat: 0–4 against Roma, 21 November 1979
- Record (away) defeat in European competitions: 0–6 against Ajax, European Super Cup, 16 January 1974
- Record home defeat in European competitions: 0–3 against Lille, Europa League, 5 November 2020

=== Streaks ===
==== Winning runs ====
- Longest winning run in all competitions: 15, 17 May 1992 – 25 October 1992
- Longest league winning run: 10, 28 January 1951 – 1 April 1951
- Longest winning run in Coppa Italia: 7, 4 September 1966 – 3 September 1967
- Longest winning run in UEFA Champions League: 10, 16 September 1992 – 21 April 1993

==== Unbeaten runs ====
- Longest unbeaten run in all competitions: 42, 18 April 1992 – 7 March 1993
- Longest league unbeaten run: 58, 26 May 1991 – 14 March 1993
- Longest unbeaten run in European competitions: 17, 19 April 1972 – 10 April 1974
- Longest unbeaten run in UEFA Champions League: 12, 7 September 1988 – 18 October 1989 and 15 September 1993 – 18 May 1994

==== Other runs ====
- Longest winless run in all competitions: 11, 2 February 1930 – 4 May 1930 and 27 February 1977 – 8 May 1977
- Most league defeats in a row: 5, 10 March 1974 – 6 April 1974

=== Goals ===
- Most goals scored in a Serie A season: 118 in 38 games, during the 1949–50 season
- Fewest goals scored in a Serie A season: 21 in 30 games, during the 1981–82 season
- Most goals conceded in a Serie A season: 62 in 34 games, during the 1932–33 season
- Fewest goals conceded in a Serie A season: 12 in 30 games, during the 1968–69 season
- Longest league scoring run: 38, 11 January 2020 – 18 January 2021

=== Points ===
- Most points in a Serie A season:
  - Two points for a win: 60 in 38 games, during the 1950–51 season
  - Three points for a win:
    - 82 in 34 games, during the 2003–04 season (league included 18 teams)
    - 86 in 38 games, during the 2021–22 season (league included 20 teams)
- Fewest points in a Serie A season:
  - Two points for a win: 24 in 30 games, during the 1981–82 season
  - Three points for a win: 43 in 34 games, during the 1996–97 season

== Player records ==
=== Trophies ===
Official competitions only.

Rank	Player	SA	CI	SCI	UCL	CWC	EL	USC	FCWC IC	Total
1	(Italy) Paolo Maldini	7	1	5	5	-	-	5	3	26
2	(Italy) Alessandro Costacurta	7	1	5	5	-	-	4	2	24
3	(Italy) Franco Baresi	6	-	4	3	-	-	3	2	18
3	(Italy) Roberto Donadoni	6	-	4	3	-	-	3	2	18
5	(Italy) Mauro Tassotti	5	-	4	3	-	-	3	2	17
5	(Italy) Filippo Galli	5	-	4	3	-	-	3	2	17
7	(Netherlands) Marco van Basten	4	-	4	3	-	-	3	2	16
8	(Italy) Demetrio Albertini	5	-	3	3	-	-	2	2	15
9	(Italy) Daniele Massaro	4	-	3	2	-	-	3	2	14
9	(Italy) Marco Simone	4	-	3	2	-	-	3	2	14

=== Appearances ===
==== Most appearances ====
Official matches only.

Rank	Player	Years	League^{[A]}	Coppa Italia	Europe^{[B]}	Other^{[C]}	Total
1	(Italy) Paolo Maldini	1984–2009	647	72	168	15	902
2	(Italy) Franco Baresi	1977–1997	532	97	75	15	719
3	(Italy) Alessandro Costacurta	1986; 1987–2007	458	78	116	11	663
4	(Italy) Gianni Rivera	1960–1979	501	74	76	7	658
5	(Italy) Mauro Tassotti	1980–1997	429	75	64	15	583
6	(Italy) Massimo Ambrosini	1995–1997; 1998–2013	344	37	101	7	489
7	(Italy) Gennaro Gattuso	1999–2012	335	26	101	6	468
8	(Netherlands) Clarence Seedorf	2002–2012	300	25	102	5	432
9	(Italy) Angelo Anquilletti	1966–1977	278	71	62	7	418
10	(Italy) Cesare Maldini	1954–1966	347	9	42	14	412

==== By competition ====
- Most appearances in all competitions: (Italy) Paolo Maldini, 902
- Most appearances in Serie A: (Italy) Paolo Maldini, 647
- Most appearances in Coppa Italia: (Italy) Franco Baresi, 97
- Most appearances in Supercoppa Italiana: (Italy) Paolo Maldini and (Italy) Alessandro Costacurta, 6
- Most appearances in international competitions: (Italy) Paolo Maldini, 176
- Most appearances in UEFA club competitions: (Italy) Paolo Maldini, 174
- Most appearances in UEFA Champions League: (Italy) Paolo Maldini, 140
- Most appearances in UEFA Europa League: (Italy) Alberto Bigon and (Ivory Coast) Franck Kessié, 26
- Most appearances in UEFA Cup Winners' Cup: (Italy) Angelo Anquilletti, 27
- Most appearances in UEFA Super Cup: (Italy) Roberto Donadoni and (Italy) Alessandro Costacurta, 8
- Most appearances in Intercontinental Cup/FIFA Club World Cup: (Italy) Paolo Maldini, 7

==== Oldest and youngest ====
- Youngest first-team player: (Italy) Gustavo Hauser, 15 years and 69 days (against U.S. Milanese, 3 March 1901)
- Youngest first-team player in Serie A: (Italy) Francesco Camarda, 15 years and 260 days (against Fiorentina, 25 November 2023)
- Youngest first-team player in UEFA Champions League: (Italy) Bryan Cristante, 16 years and 278 days (against Viktoria Plzeň, 6 December 2011)
- Oldest first-team player: (Sweden) Zlatan Ibrahimović, 41 years and 166 days (against Udinese, 18 March 2023)
- Oldest debutant: (Croatia) Luka Modric, 39 years and 348 days (against US Cremonese, 23 August 2025)
- Longest-serving player: (Italy) Paolo Maldini, 24 years and 132 days (from 20 January 1985 to 31 May 2009)

=== Goalscorers ===
==== Most goals ====
Official matches only. Matches played (including as substitute) appear in brackets.

Rank	Player	Years	League^{[A]}	Coppa Italia	Europe^{[B]}	Other^{[C]}	Total
1	(Sweden) Gunnar Nordahl	1949–1956	210 (257)	0 (0)	4 (5)	7 (6)	221 (268)
2	(Ukraine) Andriy Shevchenko	1999–2006; 2008–2009	127 (226)	7 (16)	38 (76)	3 (4)	175 (322)
3	(Italy) Gianni Rivera	1960–1979	122 (501)	28 (74)	13 (76)	1 (7)	164 (658)
4	(Brazil) (Italy) José Altafini	1958–1965	120 (205)	9 (9)	20 (19)	12 (13)	161 (246)
5	(Italy) Aldo Boffi	1936–1945	109 (163)	22 (23)	0 (0)	0 (1)	131 (187)
6	(Italy) Filippo Inzaghi	2001–2012	73 (202)	10 (20)	41 (74)	2 (4)	126 (300)
7	(Netherlands) Marco van Basten	1987–1995	90 (147)	13 (22)	20 (28)	2 (4)	125 (201)
8	(Italy) Giuseppe Santagostino	1921–1932	103 (233)	2 (1)	0 (0)	1 (2)	106 (236)
9	(Brazil) Kaká	2003–2009; 2013–2014	77 (223)	0 (11)	26 (69)	1 (4)	104 (307)
10	(Italy) Pierino Prati	1966–1973	72 (143)	14 (34)	16 (30)	0 (2)	102 (209)

==== By competition ====
- Most goals in all competitions: (Sweden) Gunnar Nordahl, 221
- Most goals in Serie A: (Sweden) Gunnar Nordahl, 210
- Most goals in Coppa Italia: (Italy) Gianni Rivera, 28
- Most goals in Supercoppa Italiana: (Ukraine) Andriy Shevchenko, 3
- Most goals in international competitions: (Italy) Filippo Inzaghi, 43
- Most goals in UEFA club competitions: (Italy) Filippo Inzaghi, 41
- Most goals in UEFA Champions League: (Italy) Filippo Inzaghi and (Ukraine) Andriy Shevchenko, 33
- Most goals in UEFA Europa League: (Italy) Patrick Cutrone, 10
- Most goals in UEFA Cup Winners' Cup: (Italy) Luciano Chiarugi, 11
- Most goals in UEFA Super Cup: (Italy) Alberico Evani, 2
- Most goals in Intercontinental Cup/FIFA Club World Cup: (Brazil) Amarildo, (Italy) Bruno Mora, (Brazil) (Italy) Angelo Sormani, (Netherlands) Frank Rijkaard, (Italy) Filippo Inzaghi, 2

==== Oldest and youngest ====
- Youngest goalscorer: (Italy) Renzo De Vecchi, 15 years and 298 days (against Torino, 28 November 1909)
- Youngest goalscorer in Serie A: (Italy) Gianni Rivera, 17 years and 80 days (against Juventus, 6 November 1960)
- Oldest goalscorer: (Sweden) Zlatan Ibrahimović, 41 years and 166 days (against Udinese, 18 March 2023)

==== Other records ====
- Most goals in a single season: (Sweden) Gunnar Nordahl, 38 (1950–51)
- Most goals in a single Serie A season: (Sweden) Gunnar Nordahl, 35 (1949–50)
- Most goals in a single UEFA Champions League/European Cup season: (Brazil) José Altafini, 14 (1962–63)
- Most goals in a single match: (Belgium) Louis van Hege (four times), (Italy) Aldo Cevenini (two times), (Italy) Carlo Galli and (Brazil) Jose Altafini, 5
- Most penalties scored: (Italy) Gianni Rivera, 39
- Most braces scored: (Sweden) Gunnar Nordahl, 49 (Note: This piece of data also includes games with 3 or more goals scored.)
- Most hat-tricks scored: (Sweden) Gunnar Nordahl, 18 (Note: This piece of data also includes games with 4 or more goals scored.)
- Fastest goal: (Portugal) Rafael Leão, 6.76 seconds (against Sassuolo, 20 December 2020)
- Most games without scoring for an outfield player: (Italy) Luigi Perversi, 341

=== Milan’s Topscorers in a single Serie A season ===
List of Milan players who won the Capocannoniere award.

Season	Player	Goals
1938–39	(Italy) Aldo Boffi	19
1939–40	(Italy) Aldo Boffi	24
1941–42	(Italy) Aldo Boffi	22
1949–50	(Sweden) Gunnar Nordahl	35
1950–51	(Sweden) Gunnar Nordahl	34
1952–53	(Sweden) Gunnar Nordahl	26
1953–54	(Sweden) Gunnar Nordahl	23
1954–55	(Sweden) Gunnar Nordahl	27
1961–62	(Brazil) (Italy) José Altafini	22
1967–68	(Italy) Pierino Prati	15
1972–73	(Italy) Gianni Rivera	17
1986–87	(Italy) Pietro Paolo Virdis	17
1989–90	(Netherlands) Marco van Basten	19
1991–92	(Netherlands) Marco van Basten	25
1999–00	(Ukraine) Andriy Shevchenko	24
2003–04	(Ukraine) Andriy Shevchenko	24
2011–12	(Sweden) Zlatan Ibrahimović	28

=== International ===
- First international appearance of a Milan player: Aldo Cevenini and Pietro Lana for Italy on 15 May 1910
- Most international caps while a Milan player: Paolo Maldini, 126 for Italy
- Most international goals while a Milan player: Gianni Rivera, 14 for Italy
- First Milan player to appear at a World Cup: Pietro Arcari for Italy at 1934 FIFA World Cup
- Most World Cup appearances while a Milan player: Paolo Maldini, 23 for Italy in 1990, 1994, 1998 and 2002
- Most World Cup goals while a Milan player: Gianni Rivera, 3 for Italy in 1962, 1966, 1970 and 1974
- First World Cup winner: Pietro Arcari in 1934 with Italy
- First non-Italian player to appear in a World Cup final: Nils Liedholm with Sweden in 1958

FIFA World Cup

The following players have won the FIFA World Cup while playing for Milan:

- Pietro Arcari (Italy 1934)
- (Italy) Franco Baresi (Spain 1982)
- (Italy) Fulvio Collovati (Spain 1982)
- Marcel Desailly (France 1998)
- (Brazil) Roque Júnior (South Korea/Japan 2002)
- (Italy) Gennaro Gattuso (Germany 2006)
- (Italy) Alberto Gilardino (Germany 2006)
- (Italy) Alessandro Nesta (Germany 2006)
- (Italy) Filippo Inzaghi (Germany 2006)
- (Italy) Andrea Pirlo (Germany 2006)

FIFA Confederations Cup

The following players have won the FIFA Confederations Cup while playing for Milan:

- (Brazil) Leonardo (Saudi Arabia 1997)
- (Brazil) Kaká (Germany 2005, South Africa 2009)
- (Brazil) Dida (Germany 2005)
- (Brazil) Alexandre Pato (South Africa 2009)

UEFA European Championship

The following players have won the UEFA European Championship while playing for Milan:

- Angelo Anquilletti (Italy 1968)
- Giovanni Lodetti (Italy 1968)
- Pierino Prati (Italy 1968)
- Gianni Rivera (Italy 1968)
- Roberto Rosato (Italy 1968)
- (Netherlands) Ruud Gullit (West Germany 1988)
- (Netherlands) Marco van Basten (West Germany 1988)
- (Italy) Gianluigi Donnarumma (Pan–European 2020)

UEFA Nations League

The following players have won the UEFA Nations League while playing for Milan:

- (France) Théo Hernandez (Italy 2021)
- (France) Mike Maignan (Italy 2021)
- (Portugal) Rafael Leão (Germany 2025)

Copa América

The following players have won the Copa América while playing for Milan:

- Lucas Paquetá (Brazil 2019)

Africa Cup of Nations

The following players have won the Africa Cup of Nations while playing for Milan:

- (Senegal) Fodé Ballo-Touré (Cameroon 2021)

CONCACAF Nations League

The following players have won the CONCACAF Nations League while playing for Milan:

- Yunus Musah (United States 2024)
- Christian Pulisic (United States 2024)

== Managerial records ==
=== Trophies ===
List of managers who won at least two trophies with Milan:

Rank	Manager	SA	CI	SCI	UCL	CWC	EL	USC	FCWC IC	Total
1	(Italy) Nereo Rocco	2	3	-	2	2	-	-	1	10
2	(Italy) Fabio Capello	4	-	3	1	-	-	1	-	9
3	(Italy) Arrigo Sacchi	1	-	1	2	-	-	2	2	8
3	(Italy) Carlo Ancelotti	1	1	1	2	-	-	2	1	8
5	(England) Herbert Kilpin	2	-	-	-	-	-	-	-	2
5	(Italy) Giuseppe Viani	2	-	-	-	-	-	-	-	2
5	(Italy) Massimiliano Allegri	1	-	1	-	-	-	-	-	2

=== Most games managed ===
Rank	Manager	Games
1	(Italy) Nereo Rocco	459
2	(Italy) Carlo Ancelotti	420
3	(Italy) Giuseppe Viani	376
4	(Italy) Fabio Capello	300
5	(Sweden) Nils Liedholm	280
6	(Italy) Stefano Pioli	240
7	(Italy) Arrigo Sacchi	220
7	(Italy) Massimiliano Allegri	220
8	(Italy) Antonio Busini	193
10	(Hungary) József Bánás	173

=== Most games won ===
Rank	Manager	Games won
1	(Italy) Nereo Rocco	243
2	(Italy) Carlo Ancelotti	238
3	(Italy) Giuseppe Viani	203
4	(Italy) Fabio Capello	161
5	(Italy) Stefano Pioli	130
6	(Sweden) Nils Liedholm	128
7	(Italy) Arrigo Sacchi	113
7	(Italy) Massimiliano Allegri	113
9	(Italy) Antonio Busini	110
10	(Hungary) Lajos Czeizler	75

=== Other records ===
- First manager: (England) Herbert Kilpin, from 1899 to 1906
- Longest-serving manager by time:
  - Single spell: (Italy) Carlo Ancelotti, 7 years and 236 days, from 6 November 2001 to 30 June 2009
  - Multiple spells: (Italy) Nereo Rocco, 9 years and 161 days, from 11 June 1961 to 16 June 1963 and from 17 June 1967 to 5 July 1972 as head coach; from 6 September 1972 to 10 February 1974, then from 5 October 1975 to 26 June 1976 and from 13 February 1977 to 3 July 1977 as technical director
- Most appearances in total: (Italy) Nereo Rocco, 459 (323 as head coach and 136 as technical director) in four spells at the club between 1961 and 1977
- Most Serie A appearances: (Italy) Nereo Rocco, 309
- Most Coppa Italia appearances: (Italy) Nereo Rocco, 67
- Most UEFA competitions appearances: (Italy) Carlo Ancelotti, 96
- Most appearances in international competitions: (Italy) Carlo Ancelotti, 98
- Most wins in total: (Italy) Nereo Rocco, 243
- Most Serie A wins: (Italy) Giuseppe Viani, 166
- Most Coppa Italia wins: (Italy) Nereo Rocco, 38
- Most UEFA competitions wins: (Italy) Carlo Ancelotti, 52
- Most wins in international competitions: (Italy) Carlo Ancelotti, 54

== Awards ==
=== Player and manager awards ===
Ballon d'Or

- 1969 – (Italy) Gianni Rivera
- 1987 – (Netherlands) Ruud Gullit
- 1988, 1989, 1992 – (Netherlands) Marco van Basten
- 1995 – (Liberia) George Weah
- 2004 – (Ukraine) Andriy Shevchenko
- 2007 – (Brazil) Kaká

FIFA World Player of the Year

- 1992 – (Netherlands) Marco van Basten
- 1995 – (Liberia) George Weah
- 2007 – (Brazil) Kaká

UEFA Club Footballer of the Year

- 2007 – (Brazil) Kaká

UEFA Best Defender of the Year (UEFA Club Football Awards)

- 2007 – (Italy) Paolo Maldini

UEFA Best Midfielder of the Year (UEFA Club Football Awards)

- 2005 – (Brazil) Kaká
- 2007 – (Netherlands) Clarence Seedorf

UEFA Best Forward of the Year (UEFA Club Football Awards)

- 2007 – (Brazil) Kaká

UEFA Best Coach of the Year (UEFA Club Football Awards)

- 2003 – (Italy) Carlo Ancelotti

World Soccer Player of the Year

- 1987 – (Netherlands) Ruud Gullit
- 1988 – (Netherlands) Marco van Basten
- 1989 – (Netherlands) Ruud Gullit
- 1992 – (Netherlands) Marco van Basten
- 1994 – (Italy) Paolo Maldini
- 2007 – (Brazil) Kaká

Onze d'Or

- 1988 – (Netherlands) Marco van Basten
- 1989 – (Netherlands) Marco van Basten
- 1995 – (Liberia) George Weah
- 2007 – (Brazil) Kaká

IFFHS World's Best Player

- 1988 – (Netherlands) Marco van Basten
- 1989 – (Netherlands) Marco van Basten

Golden Foot

- 2005 – (Ukraine) Andriy Shevchenko
- 2009 – (Brazil) Ronaldinho

European Golden Boy

- 2009 – (Brazil) Alexandre Pato

African Footballer of the Year

- 1995 – (Liberia) George Weah

Serie A Footballer of the Year

- 2004 – (Brazil) Kaká
- 2007 – (Brazil) Kaká
- 2011 – (Sweden) Zlatan Ibrahimović
- 2022 – (Portugal) Rafael Leão

Serie A Foreign Footballer of the Year

- 2000 – (Ukraine) Andriy Shevchenko
- 2004 – (Brazil) Kaká
- 2006 – (Brazil) Kaká
- 2007 – (Brazil) Kaká

Serie A Goalkeeper of the Year

- 2004 – (Brazil) Dida
- 2020 – (Italy) Gianluigi Donnarumma
- 2021 – (Italy) Gianluigi Donnarumma
- 2022 – (France) Mike Maignan
- 2023 – (France) Mike Maignan

Serie A Most Valuable Player

- 2022 – (Portugal) Rafael Leão

Serie A Coach of the Year

- 1999 – (Italy) Alberto Zaccheroni
- 2004 – (Italy) Carlo Ancelotti
- 2011 – (Italy) Massimiliano Allegri
- 2022 – (Italy) Stefano Pioli

=== Team awards ===
- Gazzetta Sports Award as best Italian sports team of the year: 1979, 1989, 2007, 2022
- Gazzetta Sports Award as best worldwide sports team of the year: 1989
- Serie A Football Club of the Year: 2022
- IFFHS The World's Club Team of the Year: 1995, 2003
- World Soccer Men's World Team of the Year: 1989, 1994, 2003
- France Football European Team of the Year: 1989, 1990
- Laureus World Sports Award for Team of the Year (nominated): 2004, 2008
- Multiple-winner badge holder (as from 2000 to 2001 season).

== Rankings ==
- European Cup / UEFA Champions League all-time club rankings (since 1955): 8th place
- UEFA coefficient top-ranked club by 5-year period (since 1975–1979): 2 times (2002–2006 and 2003–2007)
- Second-most successful Italian club by number of trophies won: 50
- FIFA Club of the Century: 9th place
- Fourth place in the IFFHS list of the best European clubs of the 20th century.
- Fifth place in the IFFHS All-time club world ranking.
- Third place in the list of Top clubs of the 20th century by Kicker sports magazine.
- Fourth place in the top 100 clubs in the history of European competitions by L'Equipe French magazine.
- Fourth place in the top 40 clubs in the history of European competitions by the BBC.

== Notes ==
A. ^{A} Includes Prima Categoria, Prima Divisione, Divisione Nazionale, Serie A and Serie B (tie-breakers are not included as well).

B. ^{B} Includes UEFA Champions League, UEFA Cup Winners' Cup, UEFA Cup, and UEFA Super Cup.

C. ^{C} The "Other" column includes goals and appearances (including those as a substitute) in Supercoppa Italiana, Inter-Cities Fairs Cup, Coppa dell'Amicizia, Coppa delle Alpi, Torneo Estivo del 1986, Mitropa Cup, Latin Cup, Intercontinental Cup and FIFA Club World Cup.

D. Home game played in Lecce.

E. Home game played in Trieste.

N
