= 1907–08 Milan FBCC season =

Italian football club season

Milan Foot-Ball and Cricket Club
1907–08 season
- President: Alfred Edwards
- Manager: Giannino Camperio
- Stadium: Campo Milan di Porta Monforte; Arena Civica
- Italian Football Championship: Forfeited
- Palla Dapples: Winner (8 times)
- Top goalscorer: League: All: Pietro Lana; Carlo Hopf; Luigi Forlano (2)
Home colours

During the 1907–08 season Milan Foot-Ball and Cricket Club competed in the Palla Dapples.

== Summary ==
For the 1907–08 season, the Italian Football Federation limited the registration to the championship only to teams made up entirely of Italian players. For this reason, Milan, which had a considerable number of foreigners in its squad, renounced registration to the championship as a sign of protest. The example was also followed by other renowned clubs.

The season was characterized by the conquest of the Palla Dapples, won on eight occasions, and the Coppa Lombardia, which, after the fourth consecutive victory, as per the regulation of the tournament, Milan definitively won. At the end of the season, Herbert Kilpin, main founder and first coach of the club, bid farewell to Milan. The final part of this season was also characterized by the first corporate crisis: 44 dissident members abandoned Milan and founded a new club, Inter.

== Squad ==
Note: Flags indicate national team as defined under FIFA eligibility rules; some limited exceptions apply. Players may hold more than one non-FIFA nationality.

| Pos. | Nation | Player |
|---|---|---|
| GK | ITA | Gerolamo Radice |
| DF | ITA | Guido Moda |
| DF | ITA | Andrea Meschia |
| DF | ITA | Attilio Colombo |
| DF | ITA | Carlo Bianchi |
| DF | ITA | Marco Sala |
| MF | ENG | Herbert Kilpin (Captain) |
| MF | SUI | Alfred Bosshard |

| Pos. | Nation | Player |
|---|---|---|
| MF | ITA | Attilio Trerè |
| FW | SUI | Hans Walter Imhoff |
| FW | ITA | Alessandro Trerè |
| FW | GER | Johann Ferdinand Mädler |
| FW | ITA | Luigi Forlano |
| FW | ITA | Vittorio Pedroni |
| FW | ITA | Pietro Lana |

== Competitions ==
=== Palla Dapples ===
==== Final ====
| 3 November 1907 1 | Milan | 6–0 | Ausonia | Milano |
| | Imhoff 10' ? | Report | | Stadium: Campo Milan di Porta Monforte |

==== Final ====
| 10 November 1907 1 | Milan | (2–0) | Ausonia | Milano |
| | ? | Report | | Referee: Franziosi |

==== Final ====
| 8 December 1907 1 | Milan | 1–3 | US Milanese | Milano |
| | Hopf 82' | Report | ? 16' Varisco | Referee: Rizzi |

==== Final ====
| 15 December 1907 1 | US Milanese | 1–2 | Milan | Milano |
| | ? | Report | 16' Lana ? | Stadium: Arena Civica; Referee: Calì |

==== Final ====
| 22 December 1907 1 | Milan | 2–1 | US Milanese | Milano |
| | Lana 16'; Pedroni | Report | Recalcati | Stadium: Campo Milan di Porta Monforte; Referee: Pedroni |

==== Final ====
| 16 February 1908 1 | Milan | 1–0 | Genoa | Milano |
| | Forlano | Report | | Stadium: Campo Milan di Porta Monforte; Referee: Frey |

==== Final ====
| 1 March 1908 1 | Milan | 2–3 | Genoa | Milano |
| | ? | Report | ? | Stadium: Campo Milan di Porta Monforte; Referee: Camperio |

==== Final ====
| 8 March 1908 1 | Genoa | 1–3 | Milan | Genova |
| | Gotzlof | Report | pen' Hopf ? Zryd | Referee: Pasteur |

==== Final ====
| 15 March 1908 1 | Milan | 2–1 | Torino | Milano |
| | Forlano 22'; Trerè 32' | Report | Frey | Stadium: Campo Milan di Porta Monforte; Referee: Magni |

==== Final ====
| 29 March 1908 1 | Milan | 1–1 | Racing Libertas | Milano |
| | ? | Report | Lindsay | Stadium: Arena Civica; Referee: Alziator |

==== Final ====
| 26 April 1908 1 | Milan | 3–0 | Genoa | Milano |
| | ? | Report | | Stadium: Arena Civica; Referee: Camperio |

== Statistics ==
=== Squad statistics ===
| Competition | Points | Home | | | | | | Away | | | | | | Total | | | | | | GD |
| Competition | Points | G | W | D | L | Gs | Ga | G | W | D | L | Gs | Ga | G | W | D | L | Gs | Ga | GD |
|---|---|---|---|---|---|---|---|---|---|---|---|---|---|---|---|---|---|---|---|---|
| 1908 Italian Football Championship | – | 0 | 0 | 0 | 0 | 0 | 0 | 0 | 0 | 0 | 0 | 0 | 0 | 0 | 0 | 0 | 0 | 0 | 0 | 0 |
| Palla Dapples | – | 9 | 5 | 1 | 2 | 18 | 9 | 2 | 2 | 0 | 0 | 5 | 2 | 11 | 7 | 1 | 2 | 23 | 11 | +12 |
| Total | – | 9 | 5 | 1 | 2 | 18 | 9 | 2 | 2 | 0 | 0 | 5 | 2 | 11 | 7 | 1 | 2 | 23 | 11 | +12 |

== See also ==
- AC Milan

== Bibliography ==
- Almanacco illustrato del Milan, ed: 2, March 2005. Panini.
- Enrico Tosi. La storia del Milan, May 2005. Italia/Italy cid Tosi.
- Milan. Sempre con te, December 2009. Mondadori. 2009. ISBN 978-88-04-59118-4.
