= 1900–01 Milan FBCC season =

Italian football club season

Milan Foot-Ball and Cricket Club
1900–01 season
- President: Alfred Edwards
- Manager: Herbert Kilpin
- Stadium: Campo Trotter; Arena Civica
- Italian Football Championship: Winner
- Medaglia del Re: Winner
- Top goalscorer: League: Ettore Negretti (3); All: Ettore Negretti (3)
Home colours

During the 1900–01 season Milan Foot-Ball and Cricket Club competed in the Italian Football Championship and the Medaglia del Re.

== Summary ==
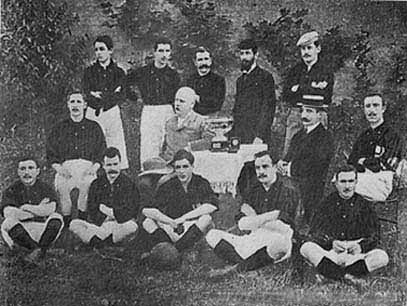
The Milan formation that won their first Italian Championship in 1901.

The 1900–01 season was characterized by the victory of the first Italian Championship in the club's history. After defeating Juventus in Turin with a 2–3 score, Milan won the final against favorites Genoa with an imposing 3–0, playing once again away. That season, the team was mainly made up of British and foreign players, with only five Italians. Manager of the club was still founder Herbert Kilpin, who, from this season, became also the team's captain, a role that he would keep until 1907.

In 1901, Milan also won the Medaglia del Re for the second time in a row after the victory of the previous year, this time by defeating Mediolanum in the quarter-finals, Juventus in the semifinals, and drawing the final played against Genoa at Milan's home ground. A play-off became necessary to define the winner, but Genoa gave their unavailability to play it; therefore, Milan won the trophy by forfeit.

With three goals, Ettore Negretti was the season's top scorer of the club, even though, as it was common at the time, for many goals there is no source showing who scored them.

== Squad ==
Note: Flags indicate national team as defined under FIFA eligibility rules; some limited exceptions apply. Players may hold more than one non-FIFA nationality.

Pos.	Nation	Player
GK	ENG	Hoberlin Hoode
DF	ITA	Catullo Gadda
DF	SUI	Hans Heinrich Suter
DF	FRA	Louis Wagner
MF	ENG	Herbert Kilpin (Captain)
MF	SUI	Kurt Lies
MF	ITA	Alberto Pirelli
MF	ITA	Daniele Angeloni

Pos.	Nation	Player
FW	ENG	David Allison
FW	ENG	Samuel Richard Davies
FW	ITA	Guerriero Colombo
FW	ENG	Edward Dobbie
FW	SUI	Ettore Negretti
FW	ITA	Agostino Recalcati
FW	WAL	Penrhyn Llewellyn Neville

=== Transfers ===
In
Pos.	Name	from	Type
DF	Catullo Gadda	Mediolanum	
DF	Hans Heinrich Suter	Grasshoppers	
FW	Edward Dobbie	FC Torinese	
FW	Ettore Negretti	Servette	
FW	Agostino Recalcati	Mediolanum	

Out
Pos.	Name	To	Type
DF	Pietro Cignaghi		Career end
DF	Lorenzo Torretta	Mediolanum	
FW	Antonio Dubini	Sempione	

== Competitions ==
=== Italian Football Championship ===
==== Semifinal ====
28 April 1901 1	Juventus	2–3	Milan	Turin
	Donna; Malvano	Report	Negretti; Kilpin	Stadium: Piazza d'armi (Torino); Referee: Nasi

==== Final ====
5 May 1901 1	Genoa	0–3	Milan	Genoa
		Report	(og) ? Kilpin; Negretti	Stadium: Campo sportivo di Ponte Carrega; Referee: Ghiglione

=== Medaglia del Re ===
==== Quarterfinals ====
3 March 1901 1	Milan	5–0	Mediolanum	Milan
	?	Report		Stadium: Campo Trotter; Referee: Carlo Nardi

==== Semifinal ====
10 March 1901 1	Milan	3–0	Juventus	Milan
	?	Report		Stadium: Campo Trotter

==== Final ====
17 March 1901 1	Milan	1–1 (a.e.t.)	Genoa	Milan
	?	Report	?	Stadium: Campo Trotter; Referee: Weber

== Statistics ==
=== Squad statistics ===
Competition	Points	Home						Away						Total						GD
Competition	Points	G	W	D	L	Gs	Ga	G	W	D	L	Gs	Ga	G	W	D	L	Gs	Ga	GD
1901 Italian Football Championship	–	0	0	0	0	0	0	2	2	0	0	6	2	2	2	0	0	6	2	+4
Medaglia del Re	–	3	2	1	0	10	1	0	0	0	0	0	0	3	2	1	0	10	1	+9
Total	–	3	2	1	0	10	1	2	2	0	0	6	2	5	4	1	0	16	3	+13

=== Players statistics ===
No.	Pos	Nat	Player	Total		Italian Football Championship	
No.	Pos	Nat	Player	Apps	Goals	Apps	Goals
	GK	(England) ENG	Hoberlin Hoode	2	-2	2	-2
	DF	(Italy) ITA	Catullo Gadda	1	0	1	0
	DF	(Switzerland) SUI	Hans Heinrich Suter	2	0	2	0
	MF	(Italy) ITA	Daniele Angeloni	2	0	2	0
	MF	(England) ENG	Herbert Kilpin	2	2	2	2
	MF	(Switzerland) SUI	Kurt Lies	2	0	2	0
	MF	(Italy) ITA	Alberto Pirelli	0	0	0	0
	MF	(France) FRA	Louis Wagner	1	0	1	0
	FW	(England) ENG	David Allison	2	0	2	0
	FW	(England) ENG	Samuel Richard Davies	2	0	2	0
	FW	(Italy) ITA	Guerriero Colombo	2	0	2	0
	FW	(England) ENG	Edward Dobbie	1	0	1	0
	FW	(Italy) ITA	Ettore Negretti	2	3	2	3
	FW	(Italy) ITA	Agostino Recalcati	0	0	0	0
	FW	(Wales) WAL	Penvhyn Llewellyn Neville	1	0	1	0

== See also ==
- AC Milan

== Bibliography ==
- Almanacco illustrato del Milan, ed: 2, March 2005. Panini.
- Enrico Tosi. La storia del Milan, May 2005. Italia/Italy cid Tosi.
- Milan. Sempre con te, December 2009. Mondadori. 2009. ISBN 978-88-04-59118-4.
