= 1901–02 Milan FBCC season =

Italian football club season

Milan Foot-Ball and Cricket Club
1901–02 season
- President: Alfred Edwards
- Manager: Herbert Kilpin
- Stadium: Campo Trotter; Arena Civica
- Italian Football Championship: Runner-up
- Medaglia del Re: Winner
- Torneo FGNI: Winner
- Top goalscorer: League: All: Giulio Cederna; Herbert Kilpin (5)
Home colours

During the 1901–02 season Milan Foot-Ball and Cricket Club competed in the Italian Football Championship, the Medaglia del Re and the FGNI Tournament.

== Summary ==
In the 1901–02 season, Milan reached the final of the Italian Championship for the second time in a row, this time without playing any knockout game being winner of the previous edition, but lost against Genoa. The final of the tournament was strangely played in Genoa instead of Milan, who were the title holders. Some sources explain the change of venue of the final by hypothesizing an economic compensation given by the Genoans in favor of Milan planyers.

This season, Milan won the third and final edition of the Medaglia del Re, thus earning the right to retain the trophy. Worth mentioning the victory in the semi-finals against the rivals of Genoa, with a 4–1 score.

In May 1902 the team participated in the Campionato Nazionale di Ginnastica (National Gymnastics Championship) football tournament. After eliminating Vicenza in the semi-finals (3–1), the club won the trophy ex aequo with Andrea Doria at the end of a final that ended with a goalless draw.

== Squad ==
Note: Flags indicate national team as defined under FIFA eligibility rules; some limited exceptions apply. Players may hold more than one non-FIFA nationality.

| Pos. | Nation | Player |
|---|---|---|
| GK | ENG | Hoberlin Hoode |
| GK | ITA | Giulio Ermolli |
| GK | ITA | Gerolamo Radice |
| DF | SUI | Alfred Cartier |
| DF | SUI | Hans Heinrich Suter |
| DF | FRA | Louis Wagner |
| DF | ITA | Carlo Ferrarese |
| DF | ITA | Andrea Meschia |
| MF | ENG | Herbert Kilpin (Captain) |
| MF | SUI | Otto Mayer |
| MF | ITA | Alberto Pirelli |
| MF | ITA | Daniele Angeloni |
| MF | ITA | Francesco Angeloni |
| MF | ITA | Giannino Camperio |

| Pos. | Nation | Player |
|---|---|---|
| MF | ITA | Giulio Cederna |
| MF | ITA | Giuseppe Rizzi |
| MF | ITA | Guido Valerio |
| MF | SUI | Paul Arnold Walty |
| MF | ITA | Angelo Delfino Parodi |
| FW | ITA | Antonio Dubini |
| FW | ENG | Samuel Richard Davies |
| FW | ITA | Attilio Formenti |
| FW | ITA | Riccardo Luzzati |
| FW | GER | Johann Ferdinand Mädler |
| FW | ITA | Guido Pedroni |
| FW | ENG | Edward Wade |
| FW | SUI | Ettore Negretti |
| FW | ITA | Guerriero Colombo |

=== Transfers ===
In
| Pos. | Name | from | Type |
|---|---|---|---|
| GK | Giulio Ermolli | Mediolanum | |
| MF | Giulio Cederna | Basilea | |
| MF | Giuseppe Rizzi | Mediolanum | |

Out
| Pos. | Name | To | Type |
|---|---|---|---|
| DF | Alfred Cartier | Genoa | |
| DF | Catullo Gadda | | |
| MF | Kurt Lies | | |
| FW | David Allison | | Career end |
| FW | Edward Dobbie | FC Torinese | |
| FW | Penvhyn Llewellyn Neville | | Career end |
| FW | Agostino Recalcati | Mediolanum | |

== Competitions ==
=== Italian Football Championship ===
==== Final ====
| 13 April 1902 1 | Genoa | 2–0 | Milan | Genoa |
| | 40' Salvadè; 85' Pasteur | Report | | Stadium: Campo sportivo di Ponte Carrega; Referee: Savage |

=== Medaglia del Re ===
==== Quarterfinals ====
| 9 February 1902 1 | Milan | 9–1 | Mediolanum | Milan |
| | Kilpin; Gregoletto; Rizzi; Negretti; Cederna | Report | Luzzato | Stadium: Campo Trotter; Referee: Albert Weber |

==== Semifinal ====
| 16 February 1902 1 | Milan | 4–1 | Genoa | Milan |
| | ? (aut.) 20'; Wade; Negretti; Colombo | Report | 55' Parodi | Stadium: Campo Trotter |

==== Final ====
| 23 February 1902 1 | Milan | 7–0 | Torinese | Milan |
| | Kilpin; Rizzi; Cederna | Report | | Stadium: Campo Trotter; Referee: Bosisio |

=== Torneo FGNI ===
==== Semifinal ====
| 29 May 1902 1 | Milan | 3–1 | Vicenza | Milan |
| | ? | Report | ? | Stadium: Arena Civica |

==== Final ====
| 31 May 1902 1 | Milan | 0–0 (a.e.t.) | Andrea Doria | Milan |
| | | Report | | Stadium: Arena Civica |

== Statistics ==
=== Squad statistics ===
| Competition | Points | Home | | | | | | Away | | | | | | Total | | | | | | GD |
| Competition | Points | G | W | D | L | Gs | Ga | G | W | D | L | Gs | Ga | G | W | D | L | Gs | Ga | GD |
|---|---|---|---|---|---|---|---|---|---|---|---|---|---|---|---|---|---|---|---|---|
| 1902 Italian Football Championship | – | 0 | 0 | 0 | 0 | 0 | 0 | 1 | 0 | 0 | 1 | 0 | 2 | 1 | 0 | 0 | 1 | 0 | 2 | −2 |
| Medaglia del Re | – | 3 | 3 | 0 | 0 | 20 | 2 | 0 | 0 | 0 | 0 | 0 | 0 | 3 | 3 | 0 | 0 | 20 | 2 | +18 |
| Torneo FGNI | – | 2 | 1 | 1 | 0 | 3 | 1 | 0 | 0 | 0 | 0 | 0 | 0 | 2 | 1 | 1 | 0 | 3 | 1 | +2 |
| Total | – | 5 | 4 | 1 | 0 | 23 | 3 | 1 | 0 | 0 | 1 | 0 | 2 | 6 | 4 | 1 | 1 | 23 | 5 | +18 |

=== Players statistics ===
| No. | Pos | Nat | Player | Total | | Italian Football Championship | |
| No. | Pos | Nat | Player | Apps | Goals | Apps | Goals |
|---|---|---|---|---|---|---|---|
| | GK | (England) ENG | Hoberlin Hoode | 0 | 0 | 0 | 0 |
| | GK | (Italy) ITA | Giulio Ermolli | 1 | -2 | 1 | -2 |
| | GK | (Italy) ITA | Gerolamo Radice | 0 | 0 | 0 | 0 |
| | DF | (Switzerland) SUI | Alfred Cartier | 0 | 0 | 0 | 0 |
| | DF | (Italy) ITA | Andrea Meschia | 0 | 0 | 0 | 0 |
| | DF | (Italy) ITA | Carlo Ferrarese | 1 | 0 | 1 | 0 |
| | DF | (Switzerland) SUI | Hans Heinrich Suter | 1 | 0 | 1 | 0 |
| | MF | (Italy) ITA | Daniele Angeloni | 1 | 0 | 1 | 0 |
| | MF | (England) ENG | Herbert Kilpin | 1 | 0 | 1 | 0 |
| | MF | (Italy) ITA | Giannino Camperio | 0 | 0 | 0 | 0 |
| | MF | (Italy) ITA | Giulio Cederna | 0 | 0 | 0 | 0 |
| | MF | (Switzerland) SUI | Otto Mayer | 0 | 0 | 0 | 0 |
| | MF | (Italy) ITA | Giuseppe Rizzi | 0 | 0 | 0 | 0 |
| | MF | (Italy) ITA | Guido Valerio | 0 | 0 | 0 | 0 |
| | MF | (Switzerland) SUI | Paul Arnold Walty | 0 | 0 | 0 | 0 |
| | MF | (Italy) ITA | Alberto Pirelli | 0 | 0 | 0 | 0 |
| | MF | (France) FRA | Louis Wagner | 1 | 0 | 1 | 0 |
| | FW | (England) ENG | Edward Wade | 1 | 0 | 1 | 0 |
| | FW | (Italy) ITA | Antonio Dubini | 1 | 0 | 1 | 0 |
| | FW | (England) ENG | Samuel Richard Davies | 1 | 0 | 1 | 0 |
| | FW | (Italy) ITA | Guerriero Colombo | 0 | 0 | 0 | 0 |
| | FW | (Italy) ITA | Attilio Formenti | 0 | 0 | 0 | 0 |
| | FW | (Switzerland) SUI | Ettore Negretti | 1 | 0 | 1 | 0 |
| | FW | (Germany) GER | Johann Ferdinand Mädler | 1 | 0 | 1 | 0 |
| | FW | (Italy) ITA | Guido Pedroni | 0 | 0 | 0 | 0 |

== See also ==
- AC Milan

== Bibliography ==
- Almanacco illustrato del Milan, ed: 2, March 2005. Panini.
- Enrico Tosi. La storia del Milan, May 2005. Italia/Italy cid Tosi.
- Milan. Sempre con te, December 2009. Mondadori. 2009. ISBN 978-88-04-59118-4.
