= 1902–03 Milan FBCC season =

Italian football club season

Milan Foot-Ball and Cricket Club
1902–03 season
- President: Alfred Edwards
- Manager: Herbert Kilpin
- Stadium: Campo Acquabella
- Italian Football Championship: Semifinal
Home colours

During the 1902–03 season Milan Foot-Ball and Cricket Club competed in the Italian Football Championship.

== Summary ==
In the 1902–03 season, Milan lost the semifinal of the Italian Championship thanks to a defeat by 2–0 in Milan against Juventus.

This season, Milan changed their home pitch by moving from the Campo Trotter to the Campo Acquabella. During the season, a very unpleasant event hit the club, when thieves stole all the trophies won in previous years from the Milan headquarters.

== Squad ==
Note: Flags indicate national team as defined under FIFA eligibility rules; some limited exceptions apply. Players may hold more than one non-FIFA nationality.

Pos.	Nation	Player
GK	ITA	Giulio Ermolli
GK	ITA	Gerolamo Radice
DF	SUI	Alfred Cartier
DF	SUI	Hans Heinrich Suter
DF	ITA	Carlo Ardussi
DF	ITA	Andrea Meschia
MF	ENG	Herbert Kilpin (Captain)
MF	ITA	Daniele Angeloni
MF	ITA	Francesco Angeloni

Pos.	Nation	Player
MF	ITA	Giannino Camperio
MF	ITA	Giulio Cederna
MF	ITA	Giuseppe Rizzi
MF	SUI	Paul Arnold Walty
FW	ITA	Antonio Sala
FW	ITA	Guido Gregoletto
FW	ITA	Domenico Galli
FW	ITA	Guido Pedroni
FW	ITA	Guerriero Colombo

=== Transfers ===
In
Pos.	Name	from	Type
DF	Alfred Cartier	Genoa	loan
FW	Antonio Sala	Mediolanum	

Out
Pos.	Name	To	Type
GK	Hoberlin Hoode		career end
DF	Alfred Cartier	Genoa	career end
DF	Carlo Ferrarese		career end
DF	Louis Wagner		career end
MF	Alberto Pirelli		career end
MF	Guido Valerio		career end
FW	Samuel Richard Davies		career end
FW	Antonio Dubini		career end
FW	Attilio Formenti		career end
FW	Ettore Negretti		career end
FW	Edward Wade		career end

== Competitions ==
=== Italian Football Championship ===
==== Final ====
22 March 1903 1	Milan	0–2	Juventus	Milan
		Report	Forlano; Malvano	Stadium: Campo Acquabella; Referee: Calì

== Statistics ==
=== Squad statistics ===
Competition	Points	Home						Away						Total						GD
Competition	Points	G	W	D	L	Gs	Ga	G	W	D	L	Gs	Ga	G	W	D	L	Gs	Ga	GD
1903 Italian Football Championship	–	1	0	0	1	0	2	0	0	0	0	0	0	1	0	0	1	0	2	−2

=== Players statistics ===
No.	Pos	Nat	Player	Total		Italian Football Championship	
No.	Pos	Nat	Player	Apps	Goals	Apps	Goals
	GK	(Italy) ITA	Giulio Ermolli	1	-2	1	-2
	GK	(Italy) ITA	Gerolamo Radice	0	0	0	0
	DF	(Switzerland) SUI	Alfred Cartier	1	0	1	0
	DF	(Italy) ITA	Andrea Meschia	1	0	1	0
	DF	(Switzerland) SUI	Hans Heinrich Suter	1	0	1	0
	MF	(Italy) ITA	Daniele Angeloni	1	0	1	0
	MF	(England) ENG	Herbert Kilpin	1	0	1	0
	MF	(Italy) ITA	Giannino Camperio	0	0	0	0
	MF	(Italy) ITA	Giulio Cederna	1	0	1	0
	MF	(Italy) ITA	Giuseppe Rizzi	0	0	0	0
	MF	(Switzerland) SUI	Paul Arnold Walty	1	0	1	0
	FW	(Italy) ITA	Domenico Galli	1	0	1	0
	FW	(Italy) ITA	Guerriero Colombo	1	0	1	0
	FW	(Italy) ITA	Guido Gregoletto	1	0	1	0
	FW	(Italy) ITA	Antonio Sala	0	0	0	0
	FW	(Italy) ITA	Guido Pedroni	0	0	0	0

== See also ==
- AC Milan

== Bibliography ==
- Almanacco illustrato del Milan, ed: 2, March 2005. Panini.
- Enrico Tosi. La storia del Milan, May 2005. Italia/Italy cid Tosi.
- Milan. Sempre con te, December 2009. Mondadori. 2009. ISBN 978-88-04-59118-4.
