= 1899–1900 Milan FBCC season =

Italian football club season

Milan Foot-Ball and Cricket Club
1899–1900 season
- President: Alfred Edwards
- Manager: Herbert Kilpin
- Stadium: Campo Trotter; Arena Civica
- Italian Football Championship: Semifinal
- Medaglia del Re: Winner
- Top goalscorer: League: All: David Allison (2)
Home colours

During the 1899–1900 season Milan Foot-Ball and Cricket Club competed in the Italian Football Championship and the Medaglia del Re.

== Summary ==
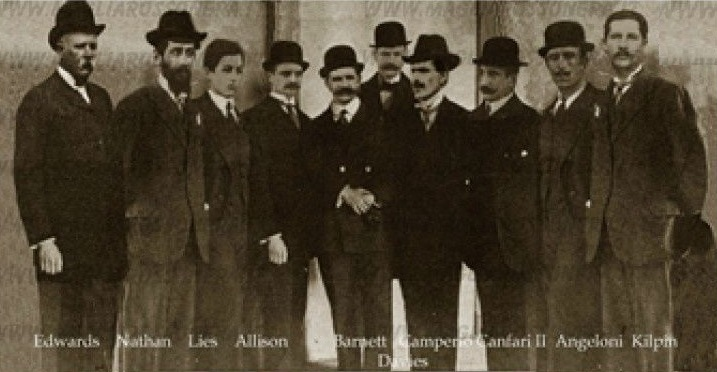
Some of the founders of Milan Foot-Ball and Cricket Club, December 1899.

"We will be a team of devils. Our colours will be red like fire and black like the fear we will invoke in our opponents."

— 1899, Herbert Kilpin

"Finally! After many unsuccessful attempts, Milan will finally have a football club. The aim of this new sports club is the very noble one of forming a Milanese team to compete in the Italian Cup next spring. For this purpose, the presidency has already made arrangements and obtained the vast Trotter premises for training. The new club warns that anyone who wishes to learn football will just have to go to the Trotter on the established days and will find instructors and playing companions."

— 15 December 1899, La Gazzetta dello Sport

AC Milan was founded as Milan Foot-Ball and Cricket Club in 1899 by English expatriate Herbert Kilpin, who wanted to give the city of Milan a club that would be able to compete with the main clubs of Turin and Genoa. He was joined by a group of compatriots and Italian businessmen. The club claims 16 December of that year as their foundation date, but historical evidence seems to suggest that the club was actually founded a few days earlier, most likely on 13 December. However, with the club's charter being lost, the exact date remains open to debate. Alfred Edwards, a former British vice-consul in Milan and well-known personality of the city's high society, was the club's first elected president, while Kilpin took the role of manager. First captain of Milan's history was David Allison, an experienced forward who was also the top scorer of the season, with two goals. The club included a cricket section, managed by Edward Nathan Berra. The location where the founders first met was the Hotel du Nord, later renamed Principe di Savoia, and the first headquarters were established in the Fiaschetteria Toscana, a restaurant near the Galleria Vittorio Emanuele II.

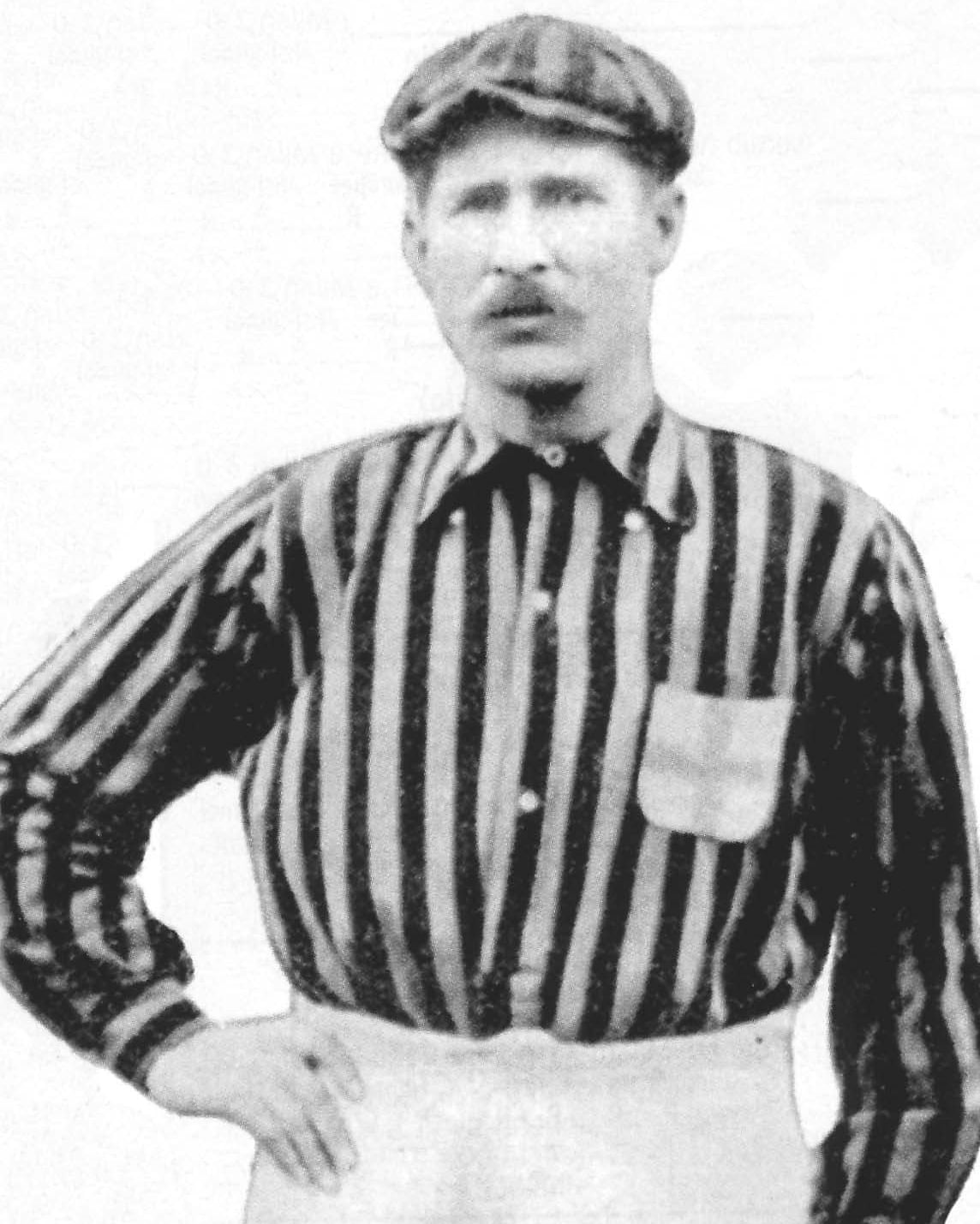
English football pioneer Herbert Kilpin: founder, footballer and manager of Milan Foot-Ball and Cricket Club wearing the characteristic Milan shirt of the 1900s.

The first game ever played by the club took place at the Trotter pitch, Milan's home ground in the first seasons, on 11 March 1900 against Mediolanum. The 2–0 win allowed the Rossoneri to reach the final of the Medaglia del Re, a trophy established in honor of king Umberto I of Italy. In the final, Milan beat Juventus with the same score to win the first trophy in their history.

After the foundation, Milan registered immediately to the Italian Football Federation and was granted the opportunity to play in their first Italian Football Championship, where they were eliminated in the semifinals by FBC Torinese with a 3–0 defeat.

== Squad ==
Note: Flags indicate national team as defined under FIFA eligibility rules; some limited exceptions apply. Players may hold more than one non-FIFA nationality.

Pos.	Nation	Player
GK	ENG	Hoberlin Hoode
DF	ITA	Pietro Cignaghi
DF	ITA	Lorenzo Torretta
MF	ITA	Giannino Camperio
MF	ENG	Herbert Kilpin
MF	SUI	Kurt Lies
MF	ITA	Alberto Pirelli

Pos.	Nation	Player
MF	ITA	Guido Valerio
FW	ENG	David Allison (Captain)
FW	ENG	Samuel Richard Davies
FW	ITA	Antonio Dubini
FW	ITA	Attilio Formenti
FW	WAL	Penvhyn Llewellyn Neville

== Competitions ==
=== Italian Football Championship ===
==== Semifinal ====
15 April 1900 1	FBC Torinese	3–0	Milan	Turin
	Bosio 15', 18', 70'	Report		Stadium: Velodromo Umberto I Referee: De Rote

=== Medaglia del Re ===
==== Semifinal ====
11 March 1900 1	Milan	2–0	Mediolanum	Milan
	Allison; Kilpin	Report		Stadium: Campo Trotter; Referee: Carlo Nardi

==== Final ====
27 May 1900 1	Milan	2–0	Juventus	Milan
	Camperio; Allison	Report		Stadium: Arena Civica

== Statistics ==
=== Squad statistics ===
Competition	Points	Home						Away						Total						GD
Competition	Points	G	W	D	L	Gs	Ga	G	W	D	L	Gs	Ga	G	W	D	L	Gs	Ga	GD
1900 Italian Football Championship	–	0	0	0	0	0	0	1	0	0	1	0	3	1	0	0	1	0	3	−3
Medaglia del Re	–	2	2	0	0	4	0	0	0	0	0	0	0	2	2	0	0	4	0	+4
Total	–	2	2	0	0	4	0	1	0	0	1	0	3	3	2	0	1	4	3	+1

=== Players statistics ===
No.	Pos	Nat	Player	Total		Italian Football Championship	
No.	Pos	Nat	Player	Apps	Goals	Apps	Goals
	GK	(England) ENG	Hoberlin Hoode	1	-3	1	-3
	DF	(Italy) ITA	Pietro Cignaghi	1	0	1	0
	DF	(Italy) ITA	Lorenzo Torretta	1	0	1	0
	MF	(Italy) ITA	Giannino Camperio	0	0	0	0
	MF	(England) ENG	Herbert Kilpin	1	0	1	0
	MF	(Switzerland) SUI	Kurt Lies	1	0	1	0
	MF	(Italy) ITA	Alberto Pirelli	0	0	0	0
	MF	(Italy) ITA	Guido Valerio	1	0	1	0
	FW	(England) ENG	David Allison	1	0	1	0
	FW	(England) ENG	Samuel Richard Davies	1	0	1	0
	FW	(Italy) ITA	Antonio Dubini	1	0	1	0
	FW	(Italy) ITA	Attilio Formenti	1	0	1	0
	FW	(Wales) WAL	Penvhyn Llewellyn Neville	1	0	1	0

== See also ==
- AC Milan

== Bibliography ==
- Almanacco illustrato del Milan, ed: 2, March 2005. Panini.
- Enrico Tosi. La storia del Milan, May 2005. Italia/Italy cid Tosi.
- Milan. Sempre con te, December 2009. Mondadori. 2009. ISBN 978-88-04-59118-4.
