= 1906–07 Milan FBCC season =

Italian football club season

Milan Foot-Ball and Cricket Club
1906–07 season
- President: Alfred Edwards
- Manager: Daniele Angeloni
- Stadium: Campo Milan di Porta Monforte
- Italian Football Championship: Winner
- Torneo FGNI: Winner
- Palla Dapples: Winner (7 times)
- Top goalscorer: League: Hans Walter Imhoff (5); All: Herbert Kilpin (7)
Home colours

During the 1906–07 season Milan Foot-Ball and Cricket Club competed in the Italian Football Championship, the FGNI Tournament and the Palla Dapples.

== Summary ==
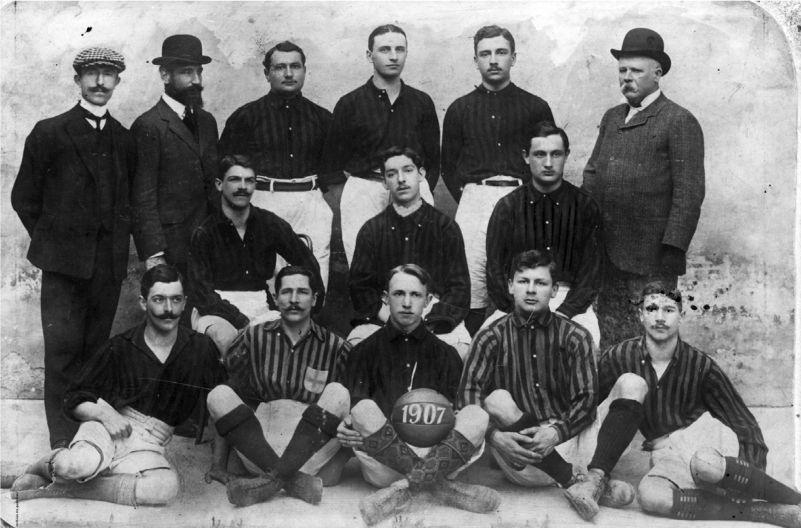
The Milan formation that won their third Italian Championship in the 1906–07 season.

In the 1906–07 season Milan won the third Italian Championship in their history, the second in a row. Added to this victory were the conquest of the Palla Dapples (seven times) and of the FGNI Tournament, two tournaments of comparable importance to that of the championship. This season, the squad showed a strong component of Swiss players: after the English athletes who were responsible for the conquest of the first scudetto in the history of Milan (1901), the large group of Swiss players was decisive for the club championship wins of 1906 and 1907. Among the others, Hans Walter Imhoff is to be remembered in this season as league top scorer for the club, with five goals. Milan won the title without defeats, a result that was extended to the other two aforementioned trophies.

Shortly before the start of the season, Herbert Kilpin, co-founder and first coach of Milan, left the role and was replaced by former player Daniele Angeloni, also a founding member of Milan. The Englishman remained in the squad and continued to be available as a player, resulting as one of the most decisive players of the season, scoring a total of seven goals (which might have been more due to the lack of sources for many goals).

== Squad ==
Note: Flags indicate national team as defined under FIFA eligibility rules; some limited exceptions apply. Players may hold more than one non-FIFA nationality.

Pos.	Nation	Player
GK	ITA	Gerolamo Radice
DF	ITA	Guido Moda
DF	ITA	Andrea Meschia
DF	ITA	Attilio Colombo
MF	ENG	Herbert Kilpin (Captain)
MF	SUI	Alfred Bosshard
MF	ITA	Gustavo Hauser
MF	SUI	Hugo Rietmann

Pos.	Nation	Player
MF	ITA	Gian Guido Piazza
MF	ITA	Attilio Trerè
FW	SUI	Hans Walter Imhoff
FW	ITA	Alessandro Trerè
FW	GER	Johann Ferdinand Mädler
FW	ITA	Camillo Parisini
FW	ITA	Vittorio Pedroni
FW	SUI	Ernst Widmer

=== Transfers ===
In
Pos.	Name	from	Type
MF	Hugo Rietmann	FC Bergamo	

Out
Pos.	Name	To	Type
GK	François Menno Knoote		career end
MF	Giuseppe Camperio		career end
MF	Oscar Joseph Giger		career end
MF	Hans Mayer Heuberger		
MF	Giuseppe Rizzi		
FW	Guerriero Colombo		career end
FW	Umberto Malvano	Juventus	
FW	Guido Pedroni		career end
FW	Antonio Sala		career end

== Competitions ==
=== Prima Categoria ===
==== Qualifications ====
13 January 1907 1	Milan	6–0	US Milanese	Milan
	Kilpin; Imhoff; Widmer	Report		Stadium: Campo Milan di Porta Monforte; Referee: Suter

3 March 1907 2	US Milanese	0–1	Milan	Milano
		Report	5' Kilpin	Stadium: Campo di Via Comasina; Referee: Bertinetti

==== Final round ====
10 March 1907 1	Torino	1–1	Milan	Torino
	Kämpfer	Report	Trerè I	Stadium: Velodromo Umberto I Referee: Spensley

17 March 1907 2	Milan	5–0	Andrea Doria	Milano
	Mädler 7' 70'; Imhoff 22' 65'; Kilpin 86'	Report		Stadium: Campo Milan di Porta Monforte; Referee: Armano

24 March 1907 3	Milan	2–2	Torino	Milano
	Trerè I rig.' pen'	Report	Kämpfer; Jacquet	Stadium: Campo Milan di Porta Monforte; Referee: Spensley

7 April 1907 4	Andrea Doria	0–2	Milan	Genova
		Report	60' Trerè I 75' Mädler	Stadium: Campo Sportivo di San Gottardo; Referee: Armano

=== Torneo FGNI ===
==== Semifinal ====
5 May 1907 1	Milan	3–1	Vicenza	Venezia
	?	Report	?	Stadium: Velodromo del Lido; Referee: Marchiandi

==== Final ====
10 May 1907 1	Milan	2–1	Andrea Doria	Venezia
	?	Report	?	Stadium: Velodromo del Lido

=== Palla Dapples ===
==== Final ====
11 November 1906 1	Milan	3–1	US Milanese	Milano
	Widmer ?	Report	?	Stadium: Campo Milan di Porta Monforte; Referee: Suter

==== Final ====
18 November 1906 1	Milan	3–1	US Milanese	Milano
	?	Report	?	Stadium: Campo Milan di Porta Monforte; Referee: Suter

==== Final ====
25 November 1906 1	Milan	4–0	Ausonia	Milano
	? 52' 63' 71' 80'	Report		Stadium: Campo Milan di Porta Monforte; Referee: Magni

==== Final ====
2 December 1906 1	Milan	5–0	Ausonia	Milano
	Kilpin; Hauser ?	Report		Stadium: Campo Milan di Porta Monforte

==== Final ====
30 December 1906 1	Milan	9–0	Ausonia	Milano
	?	Report		Stadium: Campo Milan di Porta Monforte

==== Final ====
21 April 1907 1	Milan	2–0	Torino	Milano
	Trerè II 22'; Kilpin 29'	Report		Stadium: Campo Acquabella; Referee: Pasteur

==== Final ====
28 April 1907 1	Milan	3–3	Torino	Milano
	Trerè II 3'; Kilpin 40' ?	Report	?	Stadium: Campo Milan di Porta Monforte; Referee: Magni

== Statistics ==
=== Squad statistics ===
Competition	Points	Home						Away						Total						GD
Competition	Points	G	W	D	L	Gs	Ga	G	W	D	L	Gs	Ga	G	W	D	L	Gs	Ga	GD
1907 Prima Categoria	6	3	2	1	0	13	2	3	2	1	0	4	1	6	4	2	0	17	3	+14
Torneo FGNI	–	2	2	0	0	5	2	0	0	0	0	0	0	2	2	0	0	5	2	+3
Palla Dapples	–	7	6	1	0	29	5	0	0	0	0	0	0	7	6	1	0	29	5	+24
Total	6	12	10	2	0	47	9	3	2	1	0	4	1	17	12	3	0	51	10	+41

=== Players statistics ===
No.	Pos	Nat	Player	Total		Prima Categoria	
No.	Pos	Nat	Player	Apps	Goals	Apps	Goals
	GK	(Italy) ITA	Gerolamo Radice	6	-3	6	-3
	DF	(Italy) ITA	Guido Moda	6	0	6	0
	DF	(Italy) ITA	Attilio Colombo	1	0	1	0
	DF	(Italy) ITA	Andrea Meschia	6	0	6	0
	MF	(Switzerland) SUI	Alfred Bosshard	4	0	4	0
	MF	(England) ENG	Herbert Kilpin	6	4	6	4
	MF	(Italy) ITA	Gustavo Hauser	1	0	1	0
	MF	(Italy) ITA	Gian Guido Piazza	6	0	6	0
	MF	(Italy) ITA	Attilio Trerè	6	0	6	0
	MF	(Switzerland) SUI	Hugo Rietmann	0	0	0	0
	FW	(Switzerland) SUI	Hans Walter Imhoff	6	5	6	5
	FW	(Switzerland) SUI	Ernst Widmer	6	1	6	1
	FW	(Germany) GER	Johann Ferdinand Mädler	4	3	4	3
	FW	(Italy) ITA	Alessandro Trerè	6	4	6	4
	FW	(Italy) ITA	Camillo Parisini	1	0	1	0
	FW	(Italy) ITA	Vittorio Pedroni	1	0	1	0

== See also ==
- AC Milan

== Bibliography ==
- Almanacco illustrato del Milan, ed: 2, March 2005. Panini.
- Enrico Tosi. La storia del Milan, May 2005. Italia/Italy cid Tosi.
- Milan. Sempre con te, December 2009. Mondadori. 2009. ISBN 978-88-04-59118-4.
