= Skyborry Green =

Coordinates: 52.363°N 3.080°W

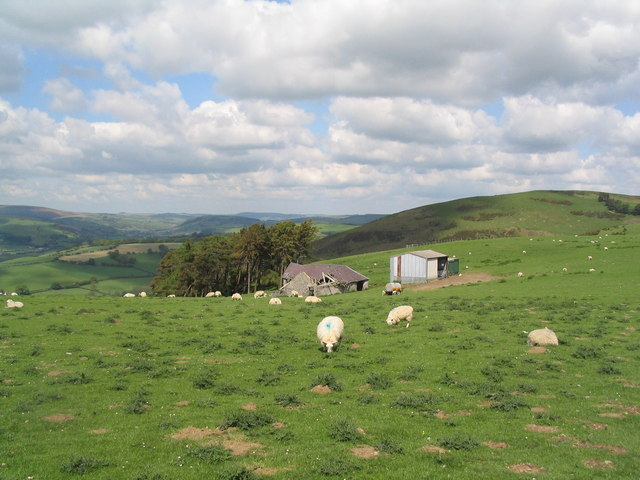
- Farm buildings above Skyborry Green, on the slopes of the Teme valley

- Location within Shropshire
- OS grid reference: SO264744
- Civil parish: Llanfair Waterdine
- Unitary authority: Shropshire
- Ceremonial county: Shropshire
- Region: West Midlands
- Country: England
- Sovereign state: United Kingdom
- Post town: KNIGHTON
- Postcode district: LD7
- Dialling code: 01547
- Police: West Mercia
- Fire: Shropshire
- Ambulance: West Midlands
- UK Parliament: Ludlow

Skyborry Green is a hamlet consisting of a small number of houses and a farm in Shropshire, England, 2 miles (3 km) northwest of Knighton. The hamlet population taken at the 2011 census can be found under Llanfair Waterdine. The Welsh border lies very close.

The name is an anglicisation of the Welsh for barn - ysgubor.

Skyborry Green lies at between 180m and 200m above sea level on the northern (English) side of the Teme valley. Nearby is Monaughty Poeth farm. The River Teme runs to the south of the hamlet. The Welsh border roughly follows the river here.

Less than 1 mile (2 km) southeast is the hamlet of Nether Skyborry. To the northwest is the small village of Llanfair Waterdine and the Welsh village of Knucklas, which has an ancient castle mound monument and railway station, is to the west.

== See also ==
- Skyborry
- Listed buildings in Llanfair Waterdine
