= Nether Skyborry =

Coordinates: 52.359°N 3.068°W

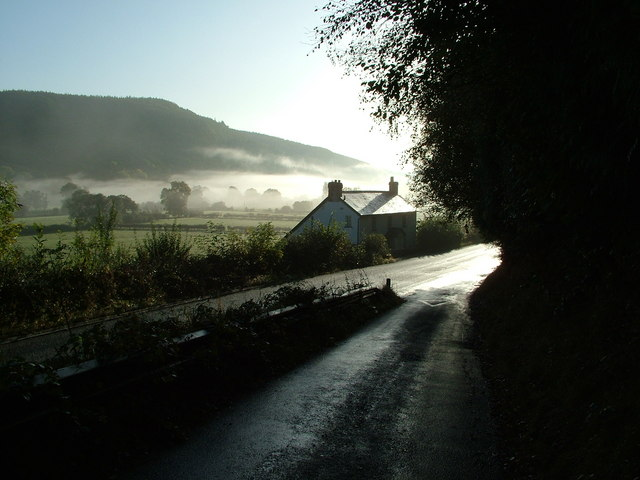
- The Teme Valley near Nether Skyborry, which lies on the opposite (north-eastern) side of the valley.

- Location within Shropshire
- OS grid reference: SO272740
- Civil parish: Llanfair Waterdine
- Unitary authority: Shropshire
- Ceremonial county: Shropshire
- Region: West Midlands
- Country: England
- Sovereign state: United Kingdom
- Post town: KNIGHTON
- Postcode district: LD7
- Dialling code: 01547
- Police: West Mercia
- Fire: Shropshire
- Ambulance: West Midlands
- UK Parliament: Ludlow

Nether Skyborry is a Grade II listed country house (near to Skyborry Green) and lies within the parish of Llanfair Waterdine, South Shropshire.

== Background ==
The house has ancient origins; the original, smaller house was built on part of the footprint of a 16th-century monastic building, part of which still remains. Nether Skyborry was impressively extended in the late 18th/early 19th century and once had seven bedrooms but, over the years, these have been reduced to a more manageable number. Nevertheless, the house still boasts no less than 13 chimneys! There are four other houses close by (including the converted stables and coach house of Nether Skyborry) forming a small hamlet. The Welsh border lies very close – the River Teme runs to the south of the hamlet. The Welsh border is just on the other side of the river but no longer follows the exact course of the river.

The name "Skyborry" is an anglicisation of the Welsh word for barn, ysgubor. "Nether" is English and means near or under. The hamlet is downstream of the other hamlet with the Skyborry place name (Skyborry Green – less than 1 mile (2 km) northwest.

Nether Skyborry lies 190–210 metres (620–690 ft) above sea level, on the northern (English) slope of the Teme valley.

== See also ==
- Skyborry
