= Skyborry =

Skyborry is the name given to two hamlets, which lie in close proximity, between Knighton and Llanfair Waterdine in Shropshire, England.

The two hamlets are:

- Skyborry Green
- Nether Skyborry

There is also a farm called simply "Skyborry" which lies between the two hamlets, but closer to Skyborry Green. Nether Skyborry is sometimes referred to as "Lower Skyborry" (it is situated further downstream of the River Teme).

The name "Skyborry" is an anglicisation of the Welsh for barn – ysgubor.

Alfred Ormond Edwards, the English businessman who while in Italy founded football club A.C. Milan, was born in Skyborry in 1850.

== See also ==
- Clun Forest
- Offa's Dyke
