= Carlo Davies =

Anglo-Italian footballer (born 1898)

Personal information
- Date of birth: 15 July 1898
- Place of birth: Milan, Italy
- Position: Defender

Senior career*
| Years | Team | Apps | (Gls) |
- Ardita Milano
| 1920–1922 | Inter Milan | 7 | (0) |
- * Club domestic league appearances and goals

Carlo Davies (born 15 July 1898) was an Anglo-Italian footballer who played for Inter Milan. Born in Milan, he was the son of Samuel Richard Davies.
