= Listed buildings in Llanfair Waterdine =

Llanfair Waterdine is a civil parish in Shropshire, England. It contains 30 listed buildings that are recorded in the National Heritage List for England. All the listed buildings are designated at Grade II, the lowest of the three grades, which is applied to "buildings of national importance and special interest". The parish contains the village of Llanfair Waterdine and the hamlet of Skyborry Green, and is otherwise entirely rural. Most of the listed buildings are houses and associated structures, cottages, farmhouses and farm buildings, a high proportion of which are timber framed, some also with cruck construction, dating from the 14th to the 18th century. The other listed buildings are a bridge, a church, and memorials in the churchyard.

== Buildings ==
Name and location	Photograph	Date	Notes
Coed-yr-hendre Farmhouse; 52.39982°N 3.15777°W	—	14th or 15th century (probable)	The farmhouse was later altered. It is timber framed with cruck construction, partly refaced and rebuilt in rendered limestone, and with a slate roof. There are two storeys and four bays, the second and fourth bays gabled, originally jettied and later underbuilt, the left with a moulded bressumer, and the right with a chamfered bressumer. The windows are casements, there is a lean-to porch, and a 19th-century rear wing.
Former House southwest of Lower Redgate; 52.40440°N 3.15430°W	—	14th or 15th century	The house, later altered and used for other purposes, is timber framed with cruck construction, refaced in sandstone, and with some rebuilding in concrete, and has a corrugated iron roof. Originally a three-bay hall house, it has one storey and an attic, and a raking eaves dormer. Inside are three pairs of cruck trusses, and timber framed cross-walls.
Lower Trebert; 52.37480°N 3.09352°W	—	14th or early 15th century	A farmhouse, later altered, it is timber framed with cruck construction, rebuilt in limestone, and with a slate roof. There is one storey and an attic, 2½ bays, and a rear outshut. The windows are casements, and there are three gabled half-dormers. Inside are three full cruck trusses.
Barn northwest of Coed-yr-hendre Farmhouse; 52.39997°N 3.15804°W	—	15th or 16th century	The barn is timber framed with cruck construction and weatherboarding, a plinth and south wall in limestone, and a corrugated iron roof. There are five bays, and the barn contains wagon doors, smaller doors, pitching openings, and loft openings. Inside there are two full cruck trusses.
Nantiago; 52.37811°N 3.10936°W	—	15th or 16th century (probable)	A rectory, later a private house, it was remodelled and extended in the 19th century. The house is basically timber framed with cruck construction, refaced and extended in rendered limestone, and with a slate roof. There is one storey and an attic, seven bays, and a lower extension to the left. On the front are four larger gables, and two smaller gables to the right, all with plain bargeboards, and three square bay windows. The windows are casements with Gothic details, and inside the house are four full cruck trusses.
Black Hall; 52.38563°N 3.10994°W	—	Late 16th or 17th century	A farmhouse that was altered and extended in the 19th century, it is basically timber framed with brick infill, weatherboarding. and slate-hung gables. The later parts are in limestone, partly rendered, and the roof is slated. There is an irregular T-shaped plan, and part of the house has one storey and an attic, and the other part has two storeys. The windows in the original part are casements, and in the later extension are sash windows and a gabled half-dormer. The older part has two gables, originally jettied, and now underbuilt, and there is a two-storey porch.
Lower Panpunton; 52.34998°N 3.05432°W	—	17th century (probable)	A farmhouse, later a private house, it was altered and extended in the 18th and 19th centuries. It is in pebbledashed limestone with a slate roof. There is one storey and an attic, and three bays. On the front is a large gable on the right, and a full dormer to the left that is flanked by two gabled eaves dormers. The windows are casements, and at the rear are a full dormer and two eaves dormers.
Barn southwest of Skyborry Farmhouse; 52.36209°N 3.07487°W	—	Mid to late 17th century	The barn is timber framed with weatherboarding on a limestone plinth, and has a slate roof. There are five bays, and in the northeast front is a central wagon porch with a dovecote in the gable, pitching openings, and doors.
Little Selley and Cart Shed; 52.38947°N 3.08094°W	—	Late 17th century	A farmhouse that was altered in the 18th century, it is in limestone, rendered on the front, and with a slate roof. It has one storey and an attic and three bays. The windows are casements, there are two raking eaves dormers, and a lean-to porch. To the left is an open-fronted cart shed with a weatherboarded loft above.
Barn southeast of Lower Panpunton; 52.34978°N 3.05426°W	—	Late 17th century	The barn is timber framed with weatherboarding on a limestone plinth and has a corrugated iron roof. There are three bays, and the barn contains a door and pitching openings.
Barn southeast of Black Hall; 52.38532°N 3.10954°W	—	Late 17th or early 18th century	The barn is timber framed with weatherboarding, it has a plinth and end walls in limestone, and a corrugated iron roof. The barn forms a long range with four bays, and contains pitching openings and doors.
Barn and Cow House south of Black Hall; 52.38518°N 3.10980°W	—	Late 17th or early 18th century	The barn and cow house that were later altered form a long range. They are partly timber framed with weatherboarding, partly in limestone, partly rebuilt in concrete, and with a corrugated iron roof. There are four bays, and the buildings contain doors and pitching openings.
Barn northwest of Upper Panpwnton Farmhouse; 52.35033°N 3.05505°W	—	Late 17th or 18th century	The barn is timber framed with weatherboarding on a limestone plinth, it is partly rebuilt in concrete, and has a slate roof. There are three bays, and contains wagon entrances, doors, and pitching openings.
Cow Houses, Stable and Cartshed southwest of Skyborry Farmhouse; 52.36228°N 3.07496°W	—	18th century (probable)	The farm buildings form a long range and have two storeys. The ground floor and end walls are in limestone with some red brick, the upper floor is timber framed with weatherboarding, and the roof is slated. The building contains various openings, including doors, windows, vents, loft doors, and a pitching opening.
Upper Panpwnton Farmhouse; 52.35019°N 3.05457°W	—	Mid to late 18th century	The farmhouse is in limestone with a slate roof, two storeys and an attic, and three bays. The windows are cross-windows, and there are two gabled dormers with curved bargeboards and finials. The door has a rectangular five-light fanlight and a flat hood on wrought iron brackets.
Llantroft Farmhouse and Cow House; 52.41206°N 3.12006°W	—	Late 18th century (probable)	The farmhouse and attached cow house are in limestone. The farmhouse has a slate roof, two storeys, two bays, and casement windows. The cow house to the right, now incorporated into the house, has a tile roof, one storey, and three doors.
Barn northeast of Llantroft Farmhouse; 52.41222°N 3.11984°W	—	Late 18th century	The barn is timber framed with weather boarding on the north, corrugated iron cladding on the south, a plinth and end walls in limestone, the plinth partly rebuilt in concrete, and a slate roof. There are three bays, and it contains wagon doors and smaller doors.
Group of three Davies memorials 52.37948°N 3.11764°W	—	Late 18th century	The memorials are in the churchyard of St Mary's Church, and are to the memory of members of the Davies family. They are three chest tombs in sandstone, and are contained in an enclosure of cast iron railings.
Cow House west of Upper Panpwnton Farmhouse; 52.35016°N 3.05485°W	—	Late 18th or early 19th century	The cow house has two storeys, the ground floor and end walls are in limestone, and above is a timber framed hayloft with weatherboarding. There is a slate roof, and it contains three doorways and a loft door.
Small Cow House northwest of Upper Panpwnton Farmhouse; 52.35033°N 3.05473°W	—	Late 18th or early 19th century	The cow house has two storeys and an attic, the ground floor is in limestone, the upper part is timber framed with weatherboarding, and the roof is slated. There is one bay, and it contains a doorway, two loft doors, and a small window. To the southeast is a lean-to extension.
Lloyd memorial 52.37929°N 3.11756°W	—	c. 1819	The memorial is in the churchyard of St Mary's Church, and is to the memory of Edward Lloyd and his wife. It is a pedestal tomb in sandstone, and has a moulded plinth, sunken panels, a moulded cornice, and a swagged urn finial.
Bright memorial 52.37935°N 3.11762°W	—	Early 19th century	The memorial is in the churchyard of St Mary's Church, and is to the memory of Edward Bright. It is a pedestal tomb in sandstone, and has a moulded plinth, raised panels with quadrant corners, a frieze and a moulded cornice, and a square finial gabled on each face.
Powell memorial 52.37929°N 3.11761°W	—	Early 19th century	The memorial is in the churchyard of St Mary's Church. It is a chest tomb in sandstone, and has a moulded plinth, fluted pilasters flanking sunken side panels, raised end panels with reeded edges, a moulded cornice and a flat top.
Hotchkiss memorial 52.37945°N 3.11764°W	—	c. 1830–40	The memorial is in the churchyard of St Mary's Church. It is a chest tomb in sandstone, and has a moulded plinth, corner balusters, sunken side panels, a cornice, and a chamfered top.
Price memorial 52.37938°N 3.11746°W	—	Early to mid 19th century	The memorial is in the churchyard of St Mary's Church, and is to the memory of John Price. It is a chest tomb in sandstone, and has a chamfered plinth, reeded corner pilasters, sunken panels, and a chamfered top.
Lloyney Bridge; 52.37732°N 3.11038°W		Early to mid 19th century	The bridge carries a road over the River Teme. It is in limestone and consists of a single segmental arch. The bridge has circular openings in the spandrels, a projecting parapet curved at the ends, and a projecting quasi-keystone.
Nether Skyborry; 52.35648°N 3.06190°W	—	Early to mid 19th century	A stuccoed house with a slate roof in Tudor Gothic style. It has two storeys, gables, and an irregular L-shaped plan. Most of the windows are sashes, some are casements, and there is a tall full dormer. There are two canted bay windows, one with one storey and French windows, and the other with two storeys and mullioned and transomed windows. In the angle is a two-storey porch.
Gateway and wall, Nether Skyborry; 52.35638°N 3.06184°W	—	Early to mid 19th century	The short wall to the right of the house forms a link to a garden gateway. The wall and gateway are in limestone and the gateway is in Tudor Gothic style. The gateway has square piers with pyramidal caps flanking a chamfered Tudor arch with a gable.
Cow House and Cartshed north of Coed-yr-hendre Farmhouse; 52.40002°N 3.15772°W	—	Mid 19th century	The cowhouse and cart shed have two storeys. The lower storey and the end walls are in limestone, the upper floor is a hayloft in timber framing with weatherboarding, and the roof is slated. It contains cowhouse and garage doors and loft openings.
St Mary's Church; 52.37954°N 3.11761°W		1853–54	The church, designed by Thomas Nicholson in Decorated style, is built on the site of a previous church. It is in limestone with a slate roof, and consists of a nave, a south porch, a north aisle, a chancel, and a north vestry. At the west end is a gabled bellcote.
