= Varisco =

Varisco is a surname. Notable people with the surname include:

- Bernardino Varisco (1850–1933), Italian philosopher
- Daniel Martin Varisco (born 1951), American anthropologist and historian
- Franco Varisco (1887–1970), Italian footballer
- Grazia Varisco (born 1937), Italian artist
- Michel Varisco (born 1967), American artist
