= Michel Varisco =

American artist

Michel Varisco (born New Orleans, Louisiana, July 13, 1967) is a contemporary American artist whose career spans more than twenty years. She works and lives in New Orleans, LA and is recognized as an environmental and social activist through her numerous fine art explorations. Michel Varisco's work spans multiple disciplines including photography, installation, assemblage and sculpture. She exhibits and publishes internationally and her work is included in public, private and corporate collections in the U.S. and abroad.

== Art ==
Michel Varisco's artwork focuses on loss and regeneration, often through photography, but also through installation art, video, and 3-dimensional forms. Much of her work explores the relationship between the natural world and engineered environments. Her photography is shot from airplanes, boats, land, and from under water, offering distinct perspectives of the environment. She is known for photo installations on silk and steel. Her Shifting Series of large-scale photos shot from the air (2010) depicted the erosion of the Louisiana coastline into the Gulf of Mexico and sea level rise Varisco comments, I enter my artwork through the anxiety of how humans and nature live in delicate balance (or imbalance), and how tenuous our co-existence is here. The Shifting Series was first exhibited at the Acadiana Center for the Arts in Lafayette, LA, then at the Ogden Museum of Southern Art in New Orleans. Works from the Shifting Series also traveled to China, the Netherlands, Miami, Los Angeles, Vermont, Washington, DC, Alabama and elsewhere. Varisco's interviews and work were included in national theatre presentations such as "Spill" (writer/director Leigh Fondakowski),NPR's traveling theatrical event "Water ±."

In her 3-D work, Varisco may cast an impression from a subject, such as in her piece "Brickdust" which features hammers cast in clear polymer alongside bricks that are in various states of deconstruction - from chunks to dust. The dust reflects the brown mud used to create bricks from the Mississippi River and Lake Pontchartrain.

Varisco is also known for public, site-specific installations such as Fragile Land, a two-year commissioned piece installed at Popp's Fountain in New Orleans’ City Park as part of a public art satellite project during Prospect 1, the first international U.S. biennial, held in New Orleans. Varisco's fourteen semi-translucent hallographic scrims of images of trees in various states of ruin and regeneration floated amidst the site's columnnade.

== Life ==
Varisco received her Bachelor of Arts from Loyola University New Orleans and a Master of Fine Arts from Tulane University. She studied and worked abroad at the Lacoste School of Art in southern France, studying with French photographer Denis Brihat. She also studied in Cortona, Italy through a University of Georgia scholarship and lived in Cologne, Germany. She currently lives in New Orleans, Louisiana and is a part-time artist/mentor at the New Orleans Center for Creative Arts. She is a founder and former Vice President of the New Orleans Photo Alliance.

== Awards ==
Varisco has been the recipient of grants or commissions from entities such as the SURDNA Foundation, the Joan Mitchell Foundation, the Louisiana Cultural Economy Foundation, the Louisiana Endowment for the Humanities, the Louisiana Division for the Arts, and the Arts Council of New Orleans. In 2014, she participated by invitation in a Rauschenberg Foundation artist residency and was an honoree of the New Orleans Museum of Art for its annual "Love in the Garden" event.

== Collections ==
Varisco's work is included in numerous private and museum collections around the world, including the Ogden Museum of Southern Art, New Orleans; the SURDNA Foundation collection, New York; the National Library of Paris in Paris, France; the United States Embassy in Moscow; the City of New Orleans Percent for Arts collection; The St. Bernard River Museum -Torres-Burnes Trust, LA; Loyola University New Orleans; Louisiana State University; Southeast Louisiana University, Hammond, Louisiana.

== Books ==
Michel Varisco with contributing essays by Anne Gisleson and Bradley Sumrall, (2012) "Shifting" A&I books, Ogden Museum of Southern Art,

=== Book collaborations ===
- Max Cafard and Michel Varisco, (2016) Lightning Storm Mind, to be published by Autonomedia in Fall of 2016
- Tom Whalen and Michel Varisco (2013) Hotel Ortolan: text by Tom Whalen, photography by Michel Varisco Black Scat Books

=== Book contributions of photography and artwork ===
1. Rachel Breunlin, Bethany Rogers, Royce Osborn, (2016) If Those Bricks Could Talk, Published by University Of New Orleans Press, ISBN 9781608010851
2. Jennifer Heath, (2015) Water, Water Everywhere: Paean to a Vanishing Resource Exhibition Catalogue, ISBN 978-1887997300
3. Diego Cortez, (2014) Reparation- Contemporary Artists from New Orleans, Imago Mundi Luciano Benetton Collection, Fabrica ISBN 9788898764310
4. Numerous contributors ( 2013) Inventing Reality, New Orleans Visionary Photography, Luna Press
5. Numerous contributors (2013) Photography and the Environment, Photoplace Exhibition Catalogue
6. Joris Lindhout and Maiike Gowenberg, (2011)To Live in the South One has to be a Scar Lover, ISBN 978-94-6190-238-2
7. 'Ed Skoog, (2009) Mister Skylight, poet Ed Skoog Copper Canyon Press, ISBN 978-1-55659-293-5
8. Numerous contributors, (2006) Intersection|New Orleans, Press Street Publications
9. Rose Macaluso, (2006) Sustained Winds Catalogue at the Acadiana Center for the Arts
10. Brad Richard, (2000) Habitations, Portals Press, ISBN 0-916620-82-4
