= Recalcati =

Recalcati is a surname of Italian origin. Notable people with the surname include:

- Antonio Recalcati (1938–2022), Italian painter and sculptor
- Carlo Recalcati (born 1945), Italian basketball coach and player

== See also ==
- Villa Recalcati, a rural palace in Varese, Italy
