= Luigi Forlano =

Italian association football player (1884–1916)

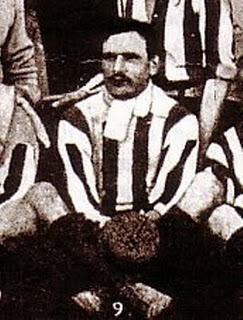

Personal information
- Date of birth: 5 July 1884
- Place of birth: Rocchetta Tanaro, Italy
- Date of death: 14 September 1916 (aged 32)
- Place of death: Nova Vas nad Dragonjo, Austria-Hungary
- Position(s): Forward

Senior career*
Years	Team	Apps	(Gls)
1900–1905	Juventus	20	(4)
1906	Torinese	0	(0)
1909	Milan	1	(0)
1910–1914	Stresa	?	(?)
- *Club domestic league appearances and goals

Luigi Forlano (5 July 1884 – 14 September 1916) was an Italian footballer who played as a forward and was a founding partner of Juventus.

== Career ==
Forlano began playing for Juventus, with which he won the Italian title of 1905 — the first in the history of the club — scoring three goals in four appearances during that tournament. With the Juventus, he played six championships scoring a total of four goals in 17 matches. After two years in the ranks of U.S. Torinese without taking the field, in 1908 he moved to Milan. He made his debut with the club on 17 January 1909 in the 1–3 away league match against US Milanese; this was his only match with the club. In the final part of his career he also played with Stresa; the Stresa stadium is named after him.

== World War I ==
During World War I, Forlano fought as captain of the Bersaglieri. On 14 and 15 September 1916, the XLVII Bersaglieri battalion, of which Forlano was a part of participated in the attack on the enemy positions between Nova Vas and altitude 208 south, reached and exceeded the objective. The XLVII battalion suffered the Austrian counterattack and at risk of being circumvented, was forced to fall back on the starting line, and was sent to Vermegliano to rearrange itself. In the action, Captain Luigi Forlano was among the missing on 14 September 1916.

Luigi Forlano had a son, Bruno, who followed in his father's footsteps by playing in Novara, and who, like his father, died in a war—in this case during the Russian campaign in the World War II.

== Honours ==
=== Juventus ===
- Prima Categoria: 1905

== See also ==
- List of people who disappeared
