= Giulio Cederna =

Swiss footballer

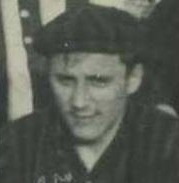
- Photo of former Italian footballer and sports manager Giulio Cederna

Personal information
- Full name: Giulio Cederna
- Date of birth: 5 February 1876
- Place of birth: Milan, Italy
- Date of death: 24 December 1939 (aged 63)
- Place of death: Milan, Italy
- Positions: Goalkeeper; midfielder

Senior career*
Years	Team	Apps	(Gls)
1898–1900	FC Winterthur		
1900–1901	FC Basel	2	(0)
1900–1901	AC Milan	4	(0)
- * Club domestic league appearances and goals

Giulio Cederna (5 February 1876 – 24 December 1939) was an Italian sports manager, business manager and footballer who played as a goalkeeper or midfielder in the late 1890s and early 1900s. He was the son of Antonio Cederna, a Garibaldi and mountaineer from Valtellina who settled in Milan to become a textile industrialist, founding a cotton mill in the district of Gratosoglio. He later opened two further mills in Agrate Brianza and Monza.

== Football ==
From 1896, Cederna attended the Technical Center in Winterthur to study chemistry. In July 1897, he became a member of FC Winterthur, and on 6 October, he was elected an assessor on the club's board of directors. The club joined the Swiss Football Association at that time and then played in Serie B Group East. On 16 January 1898, he played his first game as a liaison player (midfield) for the team. He played his second game as a goalkeeper, which was to become his preferred playing position. At the end of the 1899–1900 season, the team won their group to qualify for the final, in which they beat Neuchâtel by four goals to nil.

After completing his studies, Cederna played several games for FC Basel's reserve team. At that time, it was not uncommon for a football player to play for several clubs. He advanced to their first team during the 1900–01 season. Cederna made his domestic league debut for his club in the home game on 17 February, as Basel were defeated 2–3 by local rivals Old Boys. In his one sole season with the team, Cederna played at least three games for Basel. Two of these games were in the Swiss Series A, and one was a friendly game.

He then returned to Milan and joined the Milan Foot-Ball & Cricket Club, now AC Milan. With them, he took part in the tournament for the Medaglia del Re (King's Medal) and, as a striker, scored seven goals for his team in three winning games. He then officially joined the club and was its managing director for one season in 1902/03.

In 1902, he was part of the Milan team that took part in the football competition of the Italian gymnastics championship, and the team won the competition ex aequo with the team Andrea Doria after a goalless draw in the final. In 1904, the team repeated this success, with Cederna playing as goalkeeper in the final, as they won 3–2 against the same opponents.

In the Italian championship, Cederna played only a few games for the first team; his last of four appearances in Serie A was on 12 February 1905, in his original position as goalkeeper, after he had previously been used as a midfielder three times without success.

== Later life ==
Following his football career, Giulio Cederna took over his father's cotton mills. He became the father of five daughters and one son. His daughter, Camilla Cederna, later became famous as a journalist, writer, and editor; his son, Antonio Cederna, was a monument and nature conservation activist and co-founder of Italia Nostra. According to Camilla Cederna's autobiography, her father also devoted himself to drawing and painting in later years.

Cederna died of cancer on 24 December 1939. He found his final resting place in the Cimitero Monumentale, Milan's central cemetery.

== Sources ==
- Rotblau: Jahrbuch Saison 2017/2018. Publisher: FC Basel Marketing AG. ISBN 978-3-7245-2189-1
- Die ersten 125 Jahre. Publisher: Josef Zindel im Friedrich Reinhardt Verlag, Basel. ISBN 978-3-7245-2305-5
- Verein "Basler Fussballarchiv" homepage
- "Magliarossonera" homepage
