= Hans Walter Imhoff =

Swiss footballer (1886-1971)

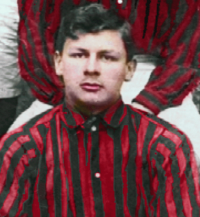

Personal information
- Full name: Hans Walter Himhoff
- Date of birth: 25 February 1886
- Place of birth: Basel, Switzerland
- Date of death: 19 March 1971 (aged 85)
- Place of death: Riehen, Switzerland
- Position: Striker

Senior career*
Years	Team	Apps	(Gls)
1906–1908	Milan	6	(5)
Total		6	(5)
- * Club domestic league appearances and goals

Hans Walter Imhoff (25 February 1886 – 19 March 1971) was a Swiss professional footballer, who played as a striker for Milan F.B.C.C.

== Honours ==
=== Club ===
- Milan F.B.C.C.
  - Prima Categoria: 1907
