= David Allison (footballer) =

French-born English footballer

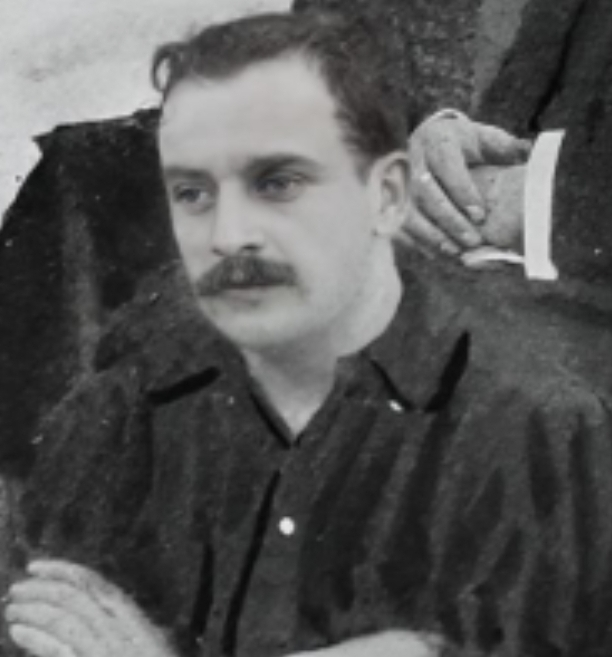

Personal information
- Full name: David Allison
- Date of birth: 1873
- Place of birth: Menton, France
- Position: Striker

Senior career*
Years	Team	Apps	(Gls)
1899–1901	Milan	4	(0)
Total		4	(0)
- * Club domestic league appearances and goals

David Allison (1873 – after 1901) was a French-born English footballer, who played as a striker.

== Club career ==
In 1899, Allison was one of the charter members of Italian club AC Milan, which was originally named Milan Foot-Ball and Cricket Club, and was selected as the first captain of the team. Allison is also credited as the first goalscorer in the history of the club, scoring the opening goal in Milan's first match, against Mediolanum, in the semifinal of the prestigious Medaglia del Re trophy, on 11 March 1900. He was also the season's top scorer with two goals, the second of which was scored in the final of the aforementioned trophy, won by his club against Juventus with a 2–0 score. In his second and last season with the club, he won the Italian Championship, the first in Milan's history, as well as a second Medaglia del Re.

== Honours ==
=== Club ===
- Milan FBCC
  - Italian Football Championship: 1901

=== Other competitions ===
- Milan FBCC
  - Medaglia del Re: 1900, 1901

Sporting positions
Preceded by N/A	Milan captain 1899–1900	Succeeded by Herbert Kilpin
