= Ettore Negretti =

Italian footballer

Personal information
- Full name: Ettore Negretti
- Date of birth: 1883
- Position: Striker

Senior career*
Years	Team	Apps	(Gls)
1900–1902	Milan	3	(3)
Total		3	(3)
- * Club domestic league appearances and goals

Ettore Negretti (1883 – after 1902) was an Italian professional footballer, who played as a striker.

== Club career ==
He played for two season with AC Milan, which was originally named Milan Foot-Ball and Cricket Club, in 1901 and 1902. In his first season, he won the first Italian Championship in the history of the club, with an important contribution, having scored two goals in the semifinal win against Juventus in Turin (2-3 the final score), and one of the three goals with which Milan defeated Genoa in the final. With the Rossoneri, he also won two times the prestigious Medaglia del Re trophy.

== Honours ==
=== Club ===
- Milan FBCC
  - Italian Football Championship: 1901

=== Other competitions ===
- Milan FBCC
  - Medaglia del Re: 1901, 1902
