= Samuel Richard Davies =

English footballer

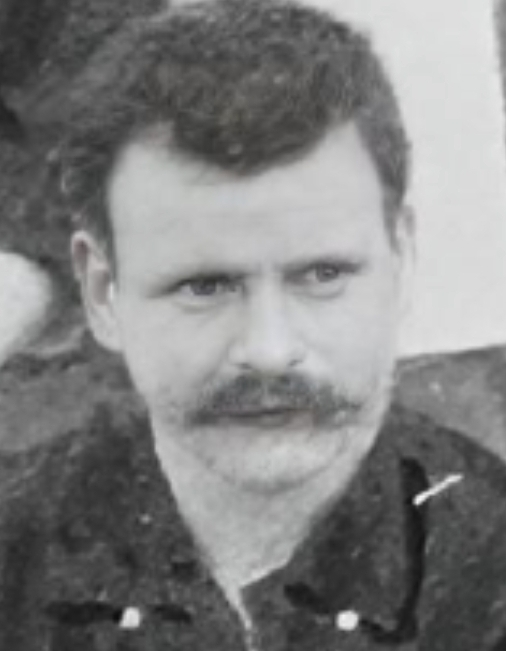

Personal information
- Full name: Samuel Richard Davies
- Date of birth: 9 November 1867
- Place of birth: Ardwick, Manchester, England
- Date of death: 17 February 1907 (aged 39)
- Place of death: Genoa, Italy
- Position: Striker

Senior career*
Years	Team	Apps	(Gls)
- Internazionale Torino
1899–1902	Milan	5	(1)
- * Club domestic league appearances and goals

Samuel Richard Davies (9 November 1867 – 17 February 1907) was an English professional footballer, who played as a striker. In 1899, he was, along with Herbert Kilpin, one of the charter members of Italian club A.C. Milan, originally named Milan Foot-Ball and Cricket Club. His son Carlo has been a footballer too.

== Honours ==
- Milan FBCC
  - Italian Football Championship: 1901

=== Other competitions ===
- Milan FBCC
  - Medaglia del Re: 1900, 1901, 1902
