= Llanfair Waterdine =

Coordinates: 52.381°N 3.117°W

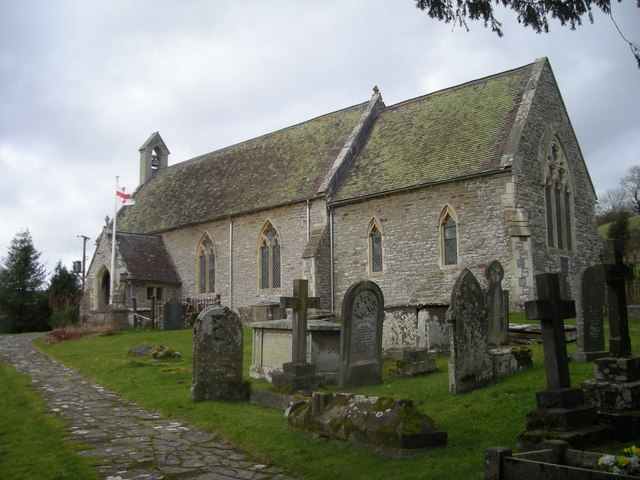
- St Mary's church, Llanfair Waterdine

- Location within Shropshire
- Population: 225 (2011
- OS grid reference: SO240764
- Civil parish: Llanfair Waterdine
- Unitary authority: Shropshire
- Ceremonial county: Shropshire
- Region: West Midlands
- Country: England
- Sovereign state: United Kingdom
- Post town: Knighton
- Postcode district: LD7
- Dialling code: 01547
- Police: West Mercia
- Fire: Shropshire
- Ambulance: West Midlands
- UK Parliament: Ludlow
- Website: http://www.llanfairparish.co.uk/

Llanfair Waterdine, sometimes written as Llanvair Waterdine and meaning St Mary's Church Waterdine, is a small village and civil parish in Shropshire, England, on the north side of the Teme valley and adjacent to the Wales-England border.

== Place name ==
"Llanfair" is a typical Welsh place name - in English it translates as "church(yard) of St Mary". "Waterdine", which means "place by the water" was added to the name to distinguish the village from other places called "Llanfair" (which is a very common place name in Wales). The place name in the Welsh language is Llanfair Dyffryn Tefeidiad (the 2nd and 3rd words mean "Teme Valley").

== Location ==
Llanfair Waterdine is just off the B4355 road, 6 km (4 mi) northwest of Knighton and near the village of Knucklas, which has a railway station. The village lies 7 km (4 1/2 mi) southwest of the small Shropshire town of Clun. Also nearby is the small village of Lloyney (just on the other side of the Teme, in Wales). The village and parish is situated on the southern edge of the Clun Forest, a remote and very rural part of Shropshire, which is only partly forested.

The village was historically in Wales, as it lies to the west of Offa's Dyke. The River Teme has naturally altered its course since the Laws in Wales Acts 1535–1542 ("Act of Union"); and so the border between Wales and England in the Teme valley no longer follows the centre of the river as it once did, but stays on what was the course of the river when the border was fixed by the Acts.

== Amenities ==
- A village hall - the Everest Hall (a tribute to John Hunt)
- A 16th-century public house, which is now primarily a restaurant and hotel, the Waterdine (formerly called the Red Lion, until 2000). The pub was originally built on the nearby Drover's road to serve the drovers taking livestock to English markets.

== Walking ==
The village lies near three long distance footpaths:

- The Jack Mytton Way
- Offa's Dyke Path
- Glyndŵr's Way

== Famous and former residents ==
- John Hunt, Baron Hunt of Llanvair Waterdine, (1910–1998), KG, CBE, DSO, the leader of the first successful expedition to climb Mount Everest, moved to the area after World War II. The local village hall is dedicated to his achievement and is called the "Everest Hall".
- Hywel ap Syr Mathew (d. 1581), poet and historian, was a native of the village. He took part in the first Eisteddfod at Caerwys in 1523, and was said by Lewys Dwnn to have been a bardic teacher. He addressed eulogies and elegies in the traditional manner to some of the leading figures of his time, including William Herbert, Earl of Pembroke, and Richard Davies, the Protestant bishop of St David's. An accomplished scribe, he made copies of The Book of Arms and was a herald bard. His chronicle of British history, written in the Welsh language, survives in two copies; it follows the style of contemporary historians in England, beginning with the sons of Noah and continuing down to 1556. In it Hywel states that he had been present at the siege of Boulogne in 1544 and some of his comments suggest that he was a devout Catholic. Both Lewys Dwnn and Dafydd Benwyn wrote elegies for him on his death.

== See also ==
- List of civil parishes in Shropshire
- Listed buildings in Llanfair Waterdine
