= Herbert Kilpin =

English footballer (1870–1916)

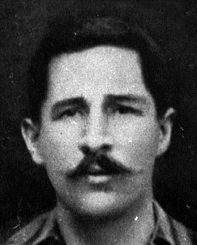

Personal information
- Date of birth: 24 January 1870
- Place of birth: Nottingham, England
- Date of death: 22 October 1916 (aged 46)
- Place of death: Milan, Italy
- Position: Utility player

Youth career
- Garibaldi Nottingham

Senior career*
Years	Team	Apps	(Gls)
- Notts Olympic
- Saint Andrews
- Torino Football & Cricket Club
1891–1899	Internazionale Torino		
1899–1908	AC Milan	23	(7)

Managerial career
- 1899–1906: AC Milan
- * Club domestic league appearances and goals

Herbert Kilpin (24 January 1870 – 22 October 1916) was an English football player and manager, best known as the main founding father of AC Milan. After playing as an amateur in his native city of Nottingham, in the early 1890s he moved to Italy to work in the textile industry and he became one of the pioneers of football in the country, first as a player for Internazionale Torino and then as player, manager, and charter member of Milan.

== Early years ==
Kilpin was born in Nottingham on 24 January 1870. The son of a butcher, he grew up with nine older siblings at 129 Mansfield Road — though the place has been renumbered to 191 Mansfield Road since 1895. After leaving school, he worked as a lace warehouse assistant in the city. He was a keen footballer and, aged only 13, he had taken part at the foundation of a small amateur club named after Italian national hero Giuseppe Garibaldi, whose players wore the typical red shirts.

== Club career ==
=== From England to Italy ===
Kilpin's footballing career went on with the recently re-established Notts Olympic and then for St. Andrews, a church team based near the Forest Recreation Ground on Gregory Boulevard, where he played as a defender and midfielder.

In 1891, Kilpin moved to Turin, in Italy, in order to work for Edoardo Bosio, an Italian-Swiss textile merchant with links to a Nottingham lace manufacturer. In the same year Bosio founded Internazionale Torino, believed to be the first full-fledged Italian football club. Kilpin played for the team, as well as Torino Football & Cricket Club, becoming the first-ever Englishman to play football abroad. During this time, he also took part in the first two editions of the Italian Football Championship, losing both times in the final against Genoa.

=== Founding of AC Milan ===
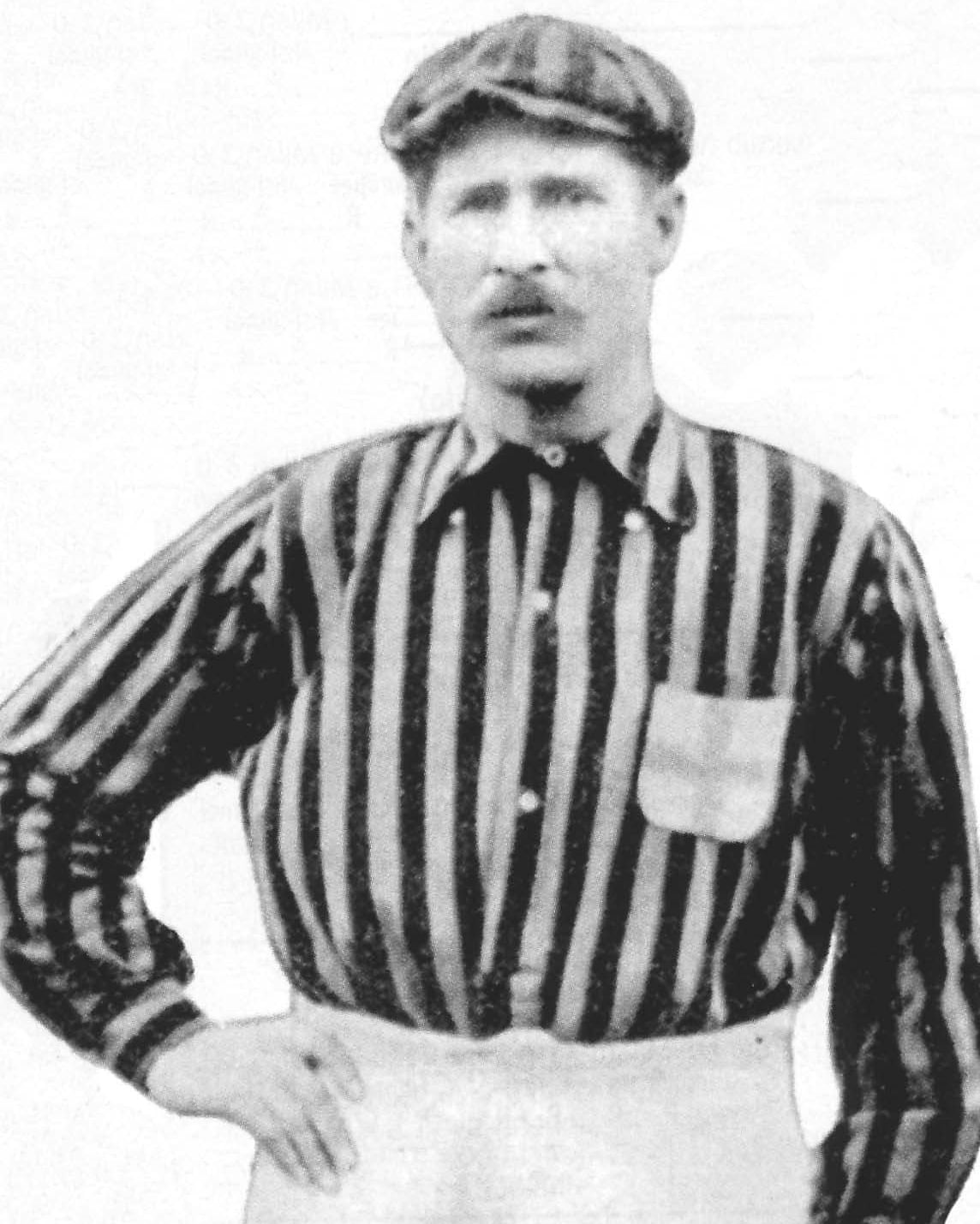
Kilpin wearing the characteristic Milan shirt of the early 1900s.

By 1898, Kilpin had already left Turin and settled in Milan with fellow Englishman Samuel Richard Davies. The following year, the duo were among the charter members of AC Milan, under the original name of Milan Foot-Ball and Cricket Club. The first elected president was Alfred Edwards; while Kilpin, who was arguably their most experienced man, would serve as player-manager. However, he decided to let his oldest teammate David Allison be the captain for the first season.

The newly founded club proved immediately successful, as they won the national title in 1901, only the second season of their history. Kilpin spent nine seasons at the club, making a total of 23 appearances and scoring 7 goals, and led the Rossoneri to two more titles in 1906 and 1907.

== Retirement and death ==
Kilpin married Maria Capua, a woman from Lodi, in 1905. Little is known about his life after he retired from football. He died in Milan on 22 October 1916, aged 46, probably due to his drinking and smoking habits. During the 1990s, an amateur historian named Luigi La Rocca tracked down Kilpin's grave, which was long believed to have been lost, in the Municipal Cemetery in Milan. It had no reference to his name and was located in a part of the cemetery reserved for Protestants. Therefore, in 1999, the club's centenary year, AC Milan paid for a new tombstone in the Monumental Graveyard. Following a petition, on 2 November 2010, Kilpin was inducted into the Famedio, the main building of the graveyard, where the tombs of the city's most illustrious personalities are located.

== The Lord of Milan book and film ==
Kilpin's story was forgotten after his death, but in 2016, author Robert Nieri released a book about his life called The Lord of Milan. It was part biography and part fiction. The author has admitted that details about Kilpin's life were so scarce that he could not complete a full biography. The same year, a team from LeftLion began filming a documentary about Herbert Kilpin's life in both the UK and Italy. The film features commentary from Robert Nieri, Luigi La Rocca, Mark Hateley, Luther Blissett, Daniele Massaro, Giovanni Lodetti, John Foot and many others. The film was shown at cinemas and film festivals across Europe in 2017 and 2018 and eventually released online and on DVD in January 2019. It won two awards at the Olympic-accredited FICTS Film Festival in Milan in October 2017 and has since toured China.

== Public House ==
In recognition of Kilpin's achievements, on Bridlesmith Walk in Nottingham, there can be found a public house named in his honour, The Kilpin.

== Honours ==
=== Player ===
- Milan FBCC
  - Italian Football Championship: 1901, 1906, 1907

=== Manager ===
- Milan FBCC
  - Italian Football Championship: 1901

=== Other competitions ===
- Milan FBCC
  - Medaglia del Re: 1900, 1901, 1902
  - FGNI tournament: 1902, 1904, 1905, 1906, 1907
  - Palla Dapples: 23 times, from 1905 to 1908

=== Individual ===
- AC Milan Hall of Fame
