= 1901 Italian Football Championship =

4th season of top-tier Italian football

Italian Football Championship
- Season: 1900–01
- Champions: Milan; 1st title
- Top goalscorer: Umberto Malvano (4)

The 1901 Italian Football Championship was the fourth edition of that competition. Milan were Italian champions for the first time, ending Genoa's run of having won all three previous editions of the competition.

== Format ==
It was contested by five Italian clubs from three Northern Italian regions. Two clubs from each of Lombardy and Piedmont played a knock-out contest to decide who would play in a final, held at the ground of reigning champions, Genoa CFC.

== Qualifications ==
Played on 14 April

Team 1	Score	Team 2
Juventus	5–0	Ginnastica Torino
Milan	2–0	Mediolanum

== Semifinal ==
Played in Turin on 28 April

Team 1	Score	Team 2
Juventus	2–3	Milan

== Final ==
Played in Genoa on 5 May

Team 1	Score	Team 2
Genoa	0–3 (aet)	Milan

== References and sources ==
- Almanacco Illustrato del Calcio - La Storia 1898-2004, Panini Edizioni, Modena, September 2005
