= Alfred Edwards (football executive) =

English businessman and football pioneer

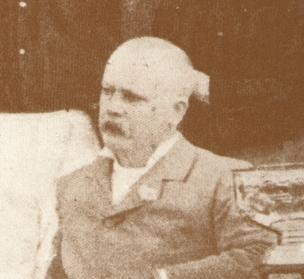
- Born: Alfred Ormond Edwards; 12 October 1850; Skyborry, Shropshire, England
- Died: 4 April 1923 (aged 72); Bridgnorth, Shropshire, England
- Resting place: Grave No. 2994D, Bridgnorth Municipal Cemetery, Bridgnorth, England
- Occupation: Businessman
- Known for: First chairman of A.C. Milan
- Spouse: Eliza Fanny Oriel (m. 1879)

Alfred Ormond Edwards (12 October 1850 – 4 April 1923) was an English businessman and football pioneer. In 1899, he was one of the founding fathers and first chairman of Italian football club A.C. Milan, under the original name of "Milan Foot-Ball and Cricket Club".

== Biography ==
Alfred Ormond Edwards was born on 12 October 1850, in Skyborry, Shropshire, England, which is near Knighton, Powys on the border of England and Wales. He was the seventh child of Charles Edwards and Theadosia Edwards (née Piper). He married Eliza Fanny Oriel on 7 August 1879, in Hammersmith, London. Having moved to Milan, Italy for business, in December 1899 he was among the twelve founding founders of football club A.C. Milan, under the original name of Milan Foot-Ball and Cricket Club. He was appointed as the first chairman of the club, serving until 1909, when he returned to England. During his time in Milan, he also served as the British vice-consul. Edwards died in Bridgnorth in 1923, after a period of illness. He is buried in the local municipal cemetery.
