= 1910 Italy v France football match =

International football match

Italy v France
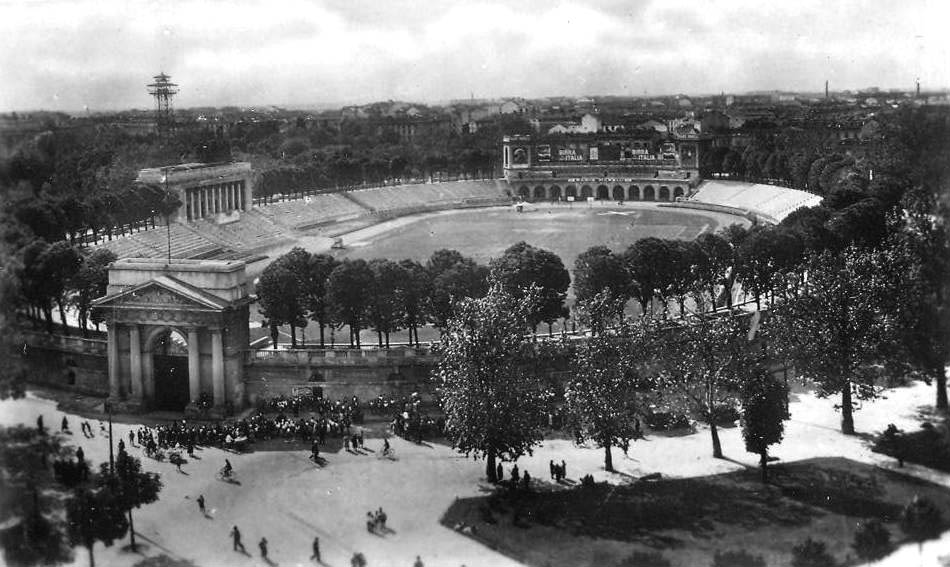
- The Arena Civica, the stadium where the match was held
- Event: International friendly
Italy	France
(Italy)	(France)
6	2
- Date: 15 May 1910
- Venue: Arena Civica, Milan
- Referee: Harry Goodley (England)
- Attendance: 4,000
- Weather: Clear

The 1910 association football match between the national teams of Italy and France was the first ever official match played by Italy. The match took place on 15 May 1910 at the Arena Civica in Milan. Officiated by Harry Goodley, the match was watched by about 4,000 spectators and ended in a 6–2 home win for Italy. Italy's Pietro Lana scored the first goal of the match, and of Italy's history.

Italy and France would give birth to what is widely considered one of the most historical rivalries in international football. They would face each other in the UEFA Euro 2000 final and the 2006 FIFA World Cup final.

== Background ==
By the time Italy played their first official match, many other nations, especially those from Northern Europe, had already formed their respective national teams. On 16 March 1898, the Italian Football Federation was founded in Turin under the name Federazione Italiana del Football (FIF). Luigi Bosisio and Arturo Baraldi, then-president and secretary of the Federation respectively, laid the groundwork for the creation of the Italian national team. Due to organisational difficulties, the Federation headquarters were later relocated to Milan. FIF officially entered FIFA—the international governing body of association football—in 1905, one year after FIFA's formation.

During this era, Pro Vercelli won the 1908 and 1909 scudetti using exclusively Italian players, in contrast to many clubs that relied heavily on English or Swiss footballers. Meanwhile, the FIF was renamed Federazione Italiana Giuoco Calcio (FIGC) in a 1909. Before the establishment of an official national team, several unofficial Italian selections had played matches against Swiss clubs. In 1899, a team of players from Genoa and Internazionale Torino faced a Swiss selection in Turin. In 1907, a FIF team played against Grasshopper in Milan.

After observing the early international matches of neighbouring countries such as France, Switzerland, and Austria, Italian football authorities, under Luigi Bosisio's impulse, decided in early 1910 to form a national team.

On 13 January 1910, the FIGC magazine read:

"THE ITALIAN NATIONAL TEAM – This year Italy will also have its national team composed only of Italian players. To this end, the FIGC has instructed the Commissione Tecnica Arbitrale ... [to] put together a team that will worthily represent the colors of Italy, with the hope that victory will come to the eleven valiant athletes."

FIGC established a technical commission composed of referees Umberto Meazza (US Milanese), Alberto Crivelli (Ausonia Milano), Agostino Recalcati (AC Milan), Giuseppe Gama (Internazionale), and Gianni Camperio (AC Milan) to select Italy's national team players. Leadership of the team was entrusted to Meazza. The players selected by the Commissione Tecnica Arbitrale were divided into two squads: one representing the "probable" starters and the other the "possible" starters. Most of the chosen players came from northwestern Italy. The formation of a national team generated widespread enthusiasm among directors, players, and fans alike. It was decided that the two squads would face each other to determine the stronger line-up. Two internal matches were played on 5 and 8 May 1910 between the "probables" and the "possibles," with the former winning both encounters—4–1 and 4–2, respectively. Ten of the eleven players from the "probables" squad would be selected to start Italy’s inaugural match against France.

Despite having won the league titles in 1908 and 1909, Pro Vercelli players were unavailable for national team duty. On 24 April 1910, the club forfeited the scudetto playoff match against Internazionale because many of its first-team players were participating in a military tournament, which held considerable importance at the time. As a result, Pro Vercelli fielded a team composed mostly of boys aged 10 to 15 and lost 3–10. The club's senior players were suspended until 31 December 1910, effectively ruling them out of Italy's historic international debut.

All France players came from Parisian clubs. Notably, Étoile des Deux Lacs had six starters. Other such clubs were AS Bon Conseil, AF La Garenne-Colombes, and CA Vitry, who provided three players including captain Étienne Jourde. France could not lean on the players coming from their top teams such as Racing Club, Stade Rennais, Patronage Olier, and Club Français due to controversies on professional and amateur football.

== Match ==
The match, played on a sunny Sunday on 15 May 1910, was Italy's first official international game. The match was set to be played at the Arena Civica in Milan, which did not typically host football matches as it was mostly a venue for chariot races and circus shows. La Stampa and Guerin Sportivo reported the presence of 4,000 spectators, while others suggested up to 8,000. The French had just lost 4–0 and 10–0 against Belgium and England, respectively. They reached Milan on a ten-hour overnight journey. France played with a white-and-light-blue-striped shirt with red hand-guards. Meanwhile, Italy played in a white shirt with starched collar and cuffs; above the breast pocket, a tricolor rectangle was stitched. The players wore socks of their choice.

The referee was former Juventus coach Harry Goodley from England.

=== Summary ===
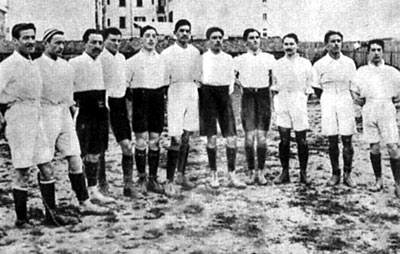
Italy team before the match

In the 13th minute, Pietro Lana scored Italy's first historical goal, assisted by Arturo Boiocchi, with a 30-metre shot. Seven minutes later, Italy doubled the score as 19-year-old Virgilio Fossati scored another long-distance goal. Aldo Cevenini scored a third goal through a header, which was later disallowed for offside. Three minutes after half-time, France halved their deficit with Henri Bellocq. France's comeback hopes were cancelled after Pietro Lana scored a brace. Jean Ducret's free-kick reduced the deficit to 3–2. However, France conceded three more goals. Giuseppe Rizzi re-established the two-goal gap after collecting goalkeeper Louis Tessier's rebound, on a Francesco Calì throw. Torino FC founder and right-winger Enrico Debernardi scored Italy's fifth goal. Finally, after a penalty had been awarded to Italy for handball on a Boiocchi's shoot, Pietro Lana made it 6–2 with a penalty kick, completing a hat-trick.

=== Details ===
15 May 1910
15:30 CEST (UTC+01:00)

Italy	6–2	France
Lana 13', 59', 89' (pen.); Fossati 20'; Rizzi 66'; Debernardi 82'	Report	Bellocq 49'; Ducret 62'

Arena Civica, Milan
Attendance: 4,000
Referee: Harry Goodley (England)

Italy
France

GK	Mario De Simoni (US Milanese)
RB	Franco Varisco (US Milanese)
LB	Francesco Calì (c) (Andrea Doria)
RH	Attilio Trerè (Ausionia)
CH	Virgilio Fossati (Internazionale)
LH	Domenico Capello (Torino)
OR	Enrico Debernardi (Torino)
IR	Giuseppe Rizzi (Ausonia)
CF	Aldo Cevenini (AC Milan)
IL	Pietro Lana (AC Milan)
OL	Arturo Boiocchi (US Milanese)
Manager:
Umberto Meazza

GK	Louis Tessier (Bon Conseil)
RB	Daniel Mercier (Étoile des Deux Lacs)
LB	Simon Sollier (Vitry)
RH	Jean Rigal (La Garenne-Colombe)
CH	Jean Ducret (Étoile des Deux Lacs)
LH	Henri Vascout (Vitry)
OR	Maurice Olivier (Étoile des Deux Lacs)
IR	Henri Bellocq (Étoile des Deux Lacs)
CF	Henri Mouton (Étoile des Deux Lacs)
IL	André Sellier (Étoile des Deux Lacs)
OL	Étienne Jourde (c) (Vitry)

== Aftermath ==
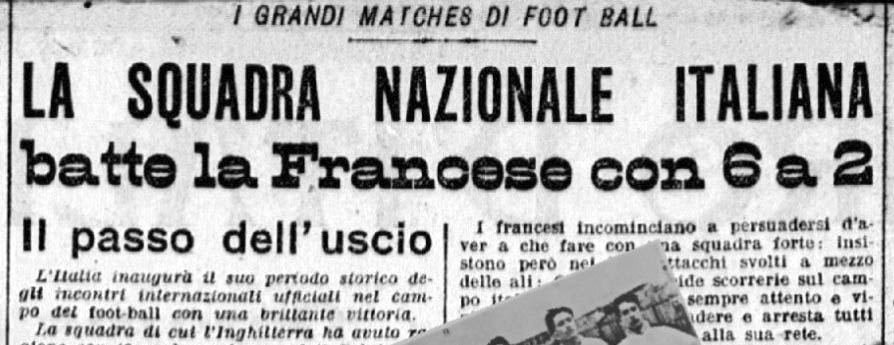
Chronicle of the match on La Gazzetta dello Sport

La Stampa characterised the game as "quite one-sided" and mentioned that it had failed to meet expectations, noting that the home team was superior in both physicality and technique. Specifically, it reported that Debernardi distinguished himself for his pace, and Rizzi, Lana, and Boiocchi for their precise low passing. Only Cevenini was reported to fall short of his teammates, due to a sprain. In addition, it remarked Italy could have won with a higher deficit had Pro Vercelli players been able to play, while France could not employ their best players. La Gazzetta dello Sport praised captain Calì's offensive abilities and his capacity to provide key passess to his teammates.

In contrast, L'Auto reported that French players were already exhausted due to the long journey to reach Italy, and that they had troubles playing in a "scorching heat".

The match marked France's tenth consecutive defeat. Étienne Jourde became France's youngest captain aged 18 years and 275 days.

Italy's following match was played 11 days later, on 26 May 1910: they lost 6–1 to Hungary in Budapest. Before the outbreak of World War I, Italy and France faced each other annually.

Four French players did not make any further appearance, namely Henri Sellier, whose only cap was the match against Italy, Henri Mouton, Daniel Mercier, and Louis Bessière. Only two players reached ten caps: Jean Ducret (20) and Jean Rigal (11).

Pietro Lana, the scorer of Italy's first goal and hat-trick, was only called-up for the match against Hungary. Virgilio Fossati fought for Italy in World War I and was killed in Monfalcone in 1916. Italy's coach, Umberto Meazza, guided them until 1924. Italy adopted the iconic blue shirt, probably as a homage to the Savoy reign in the country, starting from their third match.

France and Italy became two rival footballing nations. They have since met over 40 times, namely in the UEFA Euro 2000 final and 2006 FIFA World Cup final, with the former won by France and the latter by Italy.

== See also ==
- List of first association football internationals per country: 1872–1940
- Italy national football team results
- France national football team
- France–Italy football rivalry

== Bibliography ==
- Papa, Antonio; Panico, Guido (2002). Storia sociale del calcio in Italia [Social history of football in Italy] (in Italian). Bologna: Il Mulino. ISBN 88-15-08764-8.
- Bagnati, Giuseppe (2010). Gaetano Sconzo, Il primo capitano. Francesco Calì e la Nazionale [Gaetano Sconzo, The first captain. Francesco Calì and the National team] (in Italian). Antipodes. ISBN 978-88-96926-00-0.
- Chiesa, Carlo (2012). La grande storia del calcio italiano [The great history of Italian football] (in Italian). Guerin Sportivo.
