= History of the Italy national football team =

Italy
- Association: Italian Football Federation
- Confederation: UEFA (Europe)
- Most caps: Gianluigi Buffon (176)
- Top scorer: Gigi Riva (35)

FIFA ranking
- Highest: 1 (November 1993, February 2007, April–June 2007, September 2007)
- Lowest: 21 (August 2018)

First international
- Italy 6–2 France (Milan, Italy; 15 May 1910)

Biggest win
- Italy 9–0 United States (Brentford, England; 2 August 1948)

Biggest defeat
- Hungary 7–1 Italy (Budapest, Hungary; 6 April 1924)

World Cup
- Appearances: 18 (first in 1934)
- Best result: Champions (1934, 1938, 1982, 2006)

European Championship
- Appearances: 10 (first in 1968)
- Best result: Champions (1968, 2020)

Nations League Finals
- Appearances: 2 (first in 2021)
- Best result: Third place (2021, 2023)

Confederations Cup
- Appearances: 2 (first in 2009)
- Best result: Third place (2013)
Medal record
Olympic Games
Bronze medal – third place	1928 Amsterdam	Team
Gold medal – first place	1936 Berlin	Team
Bronze medal – third place	2004 Athens	Team

The official history of the Italy national football team began in 1910, when Italy played its first international match. Since then, the Italy national team has been one of the most successful football teams, winning four FIFA World Cups and two UEFA European Championships.

== Origins and first two World Cup titles in 1934 and 1938 ==
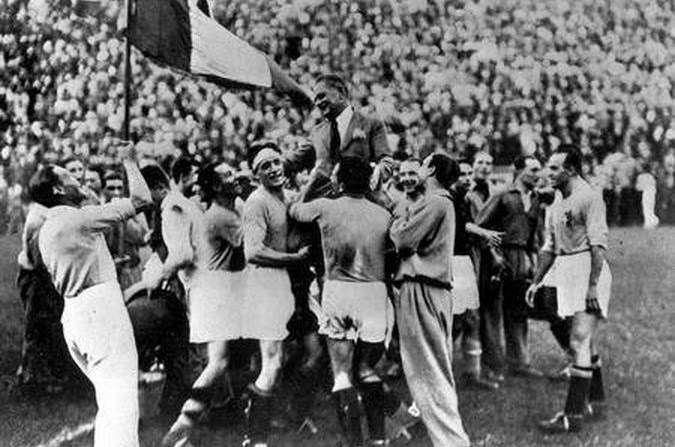
The squad celebrating its first FIFA World Cup in 1934

An early attempt to create an Italian national team occurred on 30 April 1899, when an Italian selection played a Swiss eleven, losing 0–2 in Turin. The team's first official match was held in Milan on 15 May 1910. Italy defeated France by a score of 6–2, with Italy's first goal scored by Pietro Lana. The Italian team played with a (2–3–5) system and consisted of De Simoni, Varisco, Calì, Trerè, Fossati, Capello, Debernardi, Rizzi, Cevenini I, Lana, Boiocchi, with Calì as the team's first captain.

The first success in an official tournament was the bronze medal at the 1928 Summer Olympics in Amsterdam. After losing the semi-final against Uruguay, an 11–3 victory against Egypt secured third place in the competition. In the 1927–30 and 1933–35 Central European International Cup, Italy achieved first place out of five Central European teams, topping the group with 11 points in both editions of the tournament. Italy would also later win the gold medal at the 1936 Summer Olympics with a 2–1 victory in extra time in the gold medal match over Austria on 15 August 1936.

After declining to participate in the inaugural World Cup (1930, in Uruguay) the Italy national team won two consecutive editions of the tournament in 1934 and 1938, under the direction of coach Vittorio Pozzo and the performance of Giuseppe Meazza, who is considered one of the best Italian football players of all time by some. Italy hosted the 1934 World Cup, and played their first ever World Cup match in a 7–1 win over the United States in Rome. Italy defeated Czechoslovakia 2–1 in extra time in the final in Rome, with goals by Raimundo Orsi and Angelo Schiavio to achieve their first World Cup title. They achieved their second title in 1938 in a 4–2 defeat of Hungary, with two goals by Gino Colaussi and two goals by Silvio Piola in the World Cup that followed. It is rumored that before the 1938 finals fascist Italian Prime Minister Benito Mussolini sent a telegram to the team, saying "Vincere o morire!" (literally translated as "Win or die!"). However, no record remains of such a telegram, and World Cup player Pietro Rava said when interviewed: "No, no, no, that's not true. He sent a telegram wishing us well, but no never 'win or die'."

== Reconstruction in the 1950s and 1960s ==
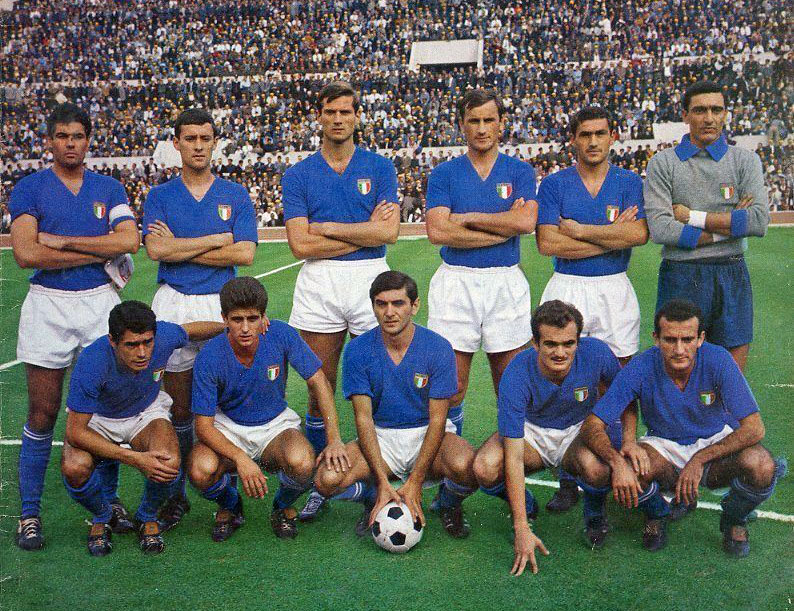
The Italy national team in 1965

In 1949, 10 of the 11 players in the team's initial line-up were killed in a plane crash that affected Torino, winners of the previous five Serie A titles. Italy did not advance further than the first round of the 1950 World Cup, as they were weakened severely due to the air disaster. The team had travelled by boat rather than by plane, fearing another accident.

In the 1954 and 1962 World Cups, Italy failed to progress past the first round, and did not qualify for the 1958 World Cup due to a 2–1 defeat to Northern Ireland in the last match of the qualifying round. Italy did not take part in the first edition of the European Championship in 1960 (then known as the European Nations Cup), and was knocked out by the Soviet Union in the first round of the 1964 European Nations' Cup qualifying.

Their participation in the 1966 World Cup was ended by a 0–1 defeat at the hands of North Korea. Despite being the tournament favourites, the Azzurri, whose 1966 squad included Gianni Rivera and Giacomo Bulgarelli, were eliminated in the first round by the semi-professional North Koreans. The Italian team was bitterly condemned upon their return home, while North Korean scorer Pak Doo-ik was celebrated as the David who killed Goliath. Upon Italy's return home, furious fans threw fruit and rotten tomatoes at their transport bus at the airport.

== European champions and World Cup runners-up (1968–1974) ==
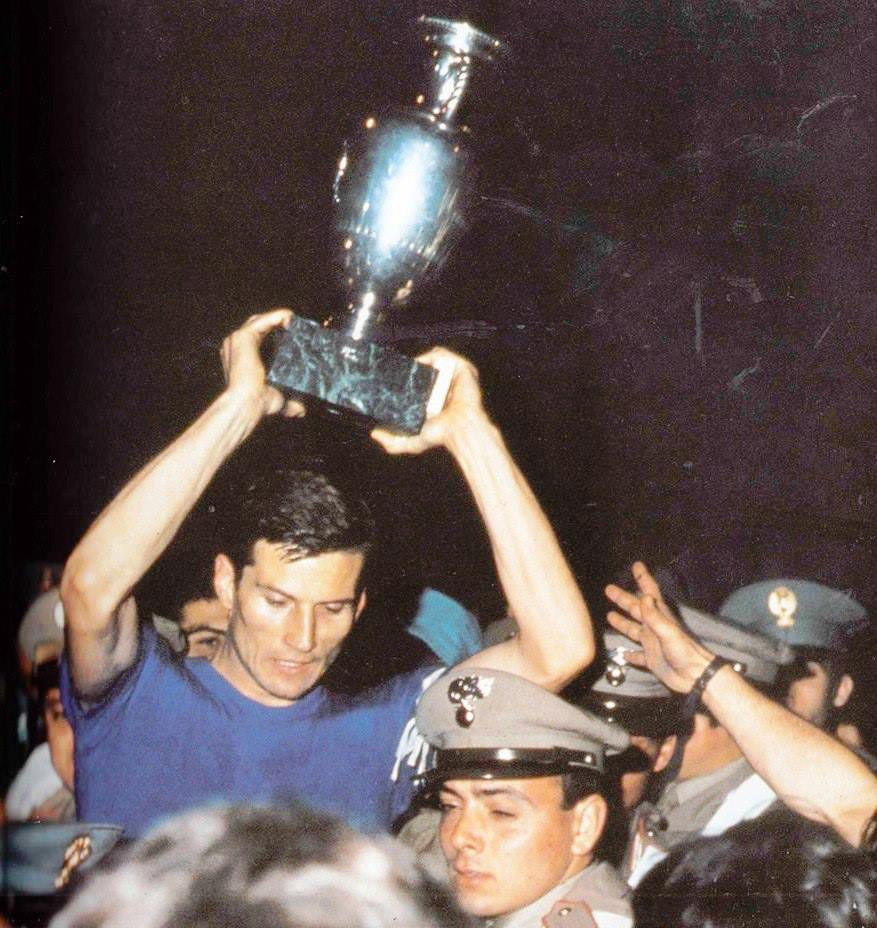
Captain Giacinto Facchetti celebrates Italy's UEFA Euro 1968 victory.

In 1968, Italy hosted the European Championship and won the tournament in its first participation, beating Yugoslavia in Rome and winning their first major competition since the 1938 World Cup. The final ended in a 1–1 draw after extra time, and the rules of the time required the match to be replayed a few days later. This would be the only time the final of the European Championship or World Cup was replayed. On 10 June 1968, Italy won the replay 2–0 (with goals from Gigi Riva and Pietro Anastasi) to take the trophy.

In the 1970 World Cup, exploiting the performances of European champions' players like Giacinto Facchetti, Gianni Rivera and Gigi Riva and with a new centre-forward Roberto Boninsegna, the team were able to return to the World Cup final match after 32 years. They reached this result after one of the most famous matches in football history—the "Game of the Century", the 1970 World Cup semifinal between Italy and West Germany that Italy won 4–3 in extra time, with five of the seven goals coming in extra time. They were later defeated by Brazil in the final 4–1.

After losing to Belgium in the quarter-finals to qualify for the 1972 European Championship, this generation's cycle ended at the 1974 World Cup, where the team was eliminated in the group stage after a 2–1 loss against Poland in the last match of the group.

== Third World Cup title generation (1978–1986) ==
Under the initial guide of Fulvio Bernardini and later that of head coach Enzo Bearzot, a new generation of Italian players came to the international stage in the second half of the 1970s. At the 1978 World Cup, Italy was the only team in the tournament to beat the eventual champions and host team Argentina, and the Azzurri made it to the third-place final, where they were defeated by Brazil 2–1. In the second round group stage match against the Netherlands, which prevented Italy from reaching the final, Italian goalkeeper Dino Zoff was beaten by a long-distance shot from Arie Haan, and Zoff was criticised for the defeat. Italy hosted the 1980 European Championship, the first edition to be held between eight teams instead of four, automatically qualifying for the finals as hosts. After two draws with Spain and Belgium and a narrow 1–0 win over England, Italy were beaten by Czechoslovakia in the third-place match on penalties 9–8 after Fulvio Collovati missed his kick.

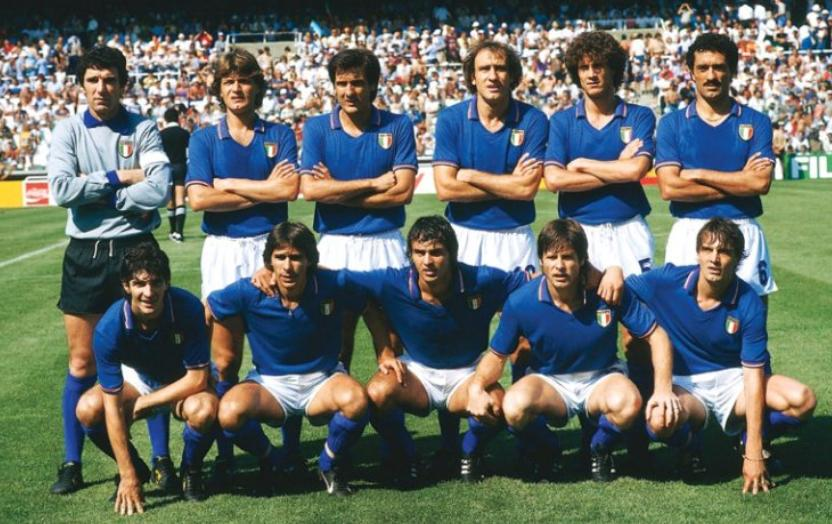
Italy's starting line-up, before the match against Argentina in a group stage game at the 1982 FIFA World Cup

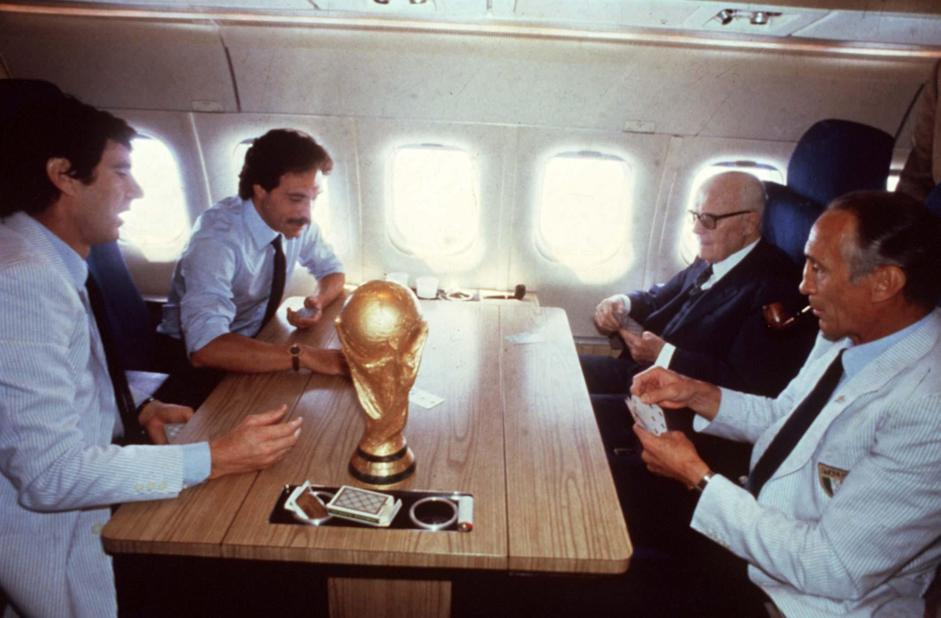
One of the widely remembered pictures of the 1982 World Cup, Italian President Sandro Pertini playing scopone with Dino Zoff, Franco Causio and coach Bearzot.

After a scandal in Serie A, where some national team players such as Paolo Rossi were prosecuted and suspended for match fixing and illegal betting, the Azzurri qualified for the second round of the 1982 World Cup after three uninspiring draws against Poland, Peru, and Cameroon. Having been loudly criticised, the Italian team decided on a press black-out from then on, with only coach Enzo Bearzot and captain Dino Zoff appointed to speak to the press. Italy's second group was a group of death with Argentina and Brazil. In the opener, Italy prevailed 2–1 over Argentina, with Italy's goals, both left-footed strikes, being scored by Marco Tardelli and Antonio Cabrini. After Brazil defeated Argentina 3–1, Italy needed to win in order to advance to the semi-finals. Italy took the lead twice with Paolo Rossi's goals, and twice Brazil came back. When Falcão scored to equalise at 2–2, Brazil would have been through on goal difference, but in the 74th minute Rossi scored the winning goal, for a hat-trick, in a crowded penalty area to send Italy to the semifinals after one of the greatest games in World Cup history. Italy then progressed to the semi-final where they defeated Poland with two goals from Rossi.

In the final on 11 July 1982, Italy met West Germany in Madrid. The first half ended scoreless, after Antonio Cabrini missed a penalty awarded for a Hans-Peter Briegel foul on Bruno Conti. In the second half Paolo Rossi again scored the first goal, and while the Germans were pushing forward in search of an equaliser, Marco Tardelli and substitute Alessandro Altobelli finalised two contropiede counterattacks to make it 3–0. Paul Breitner scored West Germany's consolation goal seven minutes before the end. Tardelli's screaming celebration after his goal was one of the defining images of Italy's 1982 World Cup triumph. Paolo Rossi won the Golden Boot with six goals as well as the Golden Ball Award for the best player of the tournament, and 40-year-old captain-goalkeeper Dino Zoff became the oldest player to win the World Cup.

Italy subsequently failed to qualify for UEFA Euro 1984, and then entered as reigning champions in the 1986 World Cup, but were eliminated by reigning European Champions, France, in the round of 16.

== Vicini years and World Cup runners-up with Sacchi (1986–1994) ==
In 1986, Azeglio Vicini was appointed as new head coach, replacing Bearzot. He granted a central role to players such as Walter Zenga and Gianluca Vialli, and conceded a chance to young players coming from the U21 team; Vialli scored goals that gave Italy a 1988 European Championship pass, and he was shown like Altobelli's successor, having his same goal attitude. Both forwards stroke the target in Germany, where the Soviet Union defeated the Azzurri in the semi-finals.

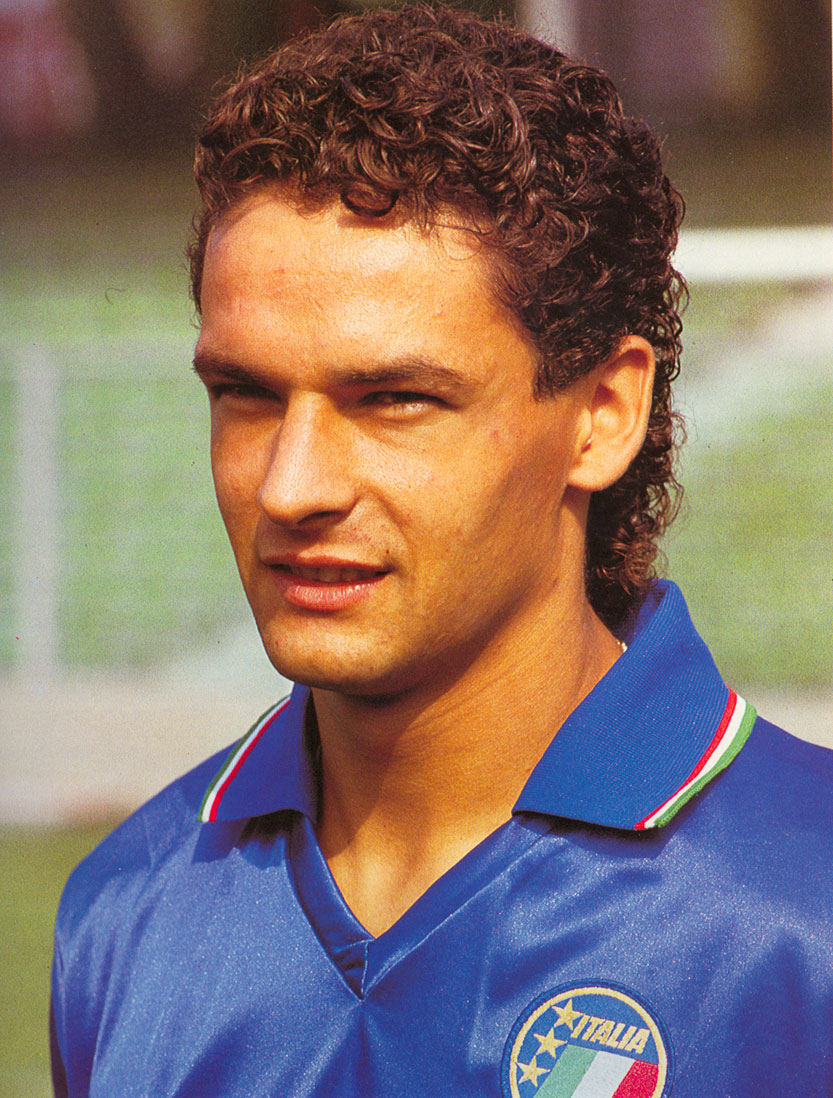
Roberto Baggio in 1990

Italy hosted the World Cup for the second time in 1990. The Italian attack featured talented forwards Salvatore Schillaci and a young Roberto Baggio. Italy played nearly all of their matches in Rome and did not concede a single goal in their first five matches; however, they lost the semi-final in Naples to defending champion Argentina. Argentinian player Diego Maradona, who played for Napoli, made comments prior to the game pertaining to the North–South inequality in Italy and the Risorgimento, asking Neapolitans to root for Argentina in the game. Italy lost 4–3 on penalty kicks following a 1–1 draw after extra time. Schillaci's first-half opener was equalised in the second half by Claudio Caniggia's header for Argentina. Aldo Serena missed the final penalty kick with Roberto Donadoni also having his penalty saved by goalkeeper Sergio Goycochea. Italy went on to defeat England 2–1 in the third-place match in Bari, with Schillaci scoring the winning goal on a penalty to become the tournament's top scorer with six goals.

After failing to qualify for UEFA Euro 1992, Vicini was replaced by former AC Milan coach Arrigo Sacchi, who brought a new style of play. In November 1993, FIFA ranked Italy No. 1 since the ranking system was introduced in December 1992.

At the 1994 World Cup in the United States, Italy lost the opening match against Ireland 0–1 at Giants Stadium in New Jersey. After a 1–0 win against Norway in East Rutherford and a 1–1 draw with Mexico at the RFK Stadium in Washington, D.C., Italy advanced from Group E based on goals scored among the four teams tied on points. During their round of 16 match at Foxboro Stadium near Boston, Italy was down 0–1 late against Nigeria, but Baggio equalised in the 88th minute and a penalty in extra time to take the win. Baggio scored another late goal against Spain at their quarter-final match in Boston to seal a 2–1 win and two goals against Bulgaria in their semi-final match in New York for another 2–1 win. In the final, which took place in Los Angeles's Rose Bowl stadium 2,700 miles (4,320 km) and three time zones away from the Northeastern United States where they had played all their previous matches, Italy, who had 24 hours less rest than Brazil, played 120 minutes of scoreless football, taking the match to a penalty shootout, the first time a World Cup final was settled on penalties. Italy lost the subsequent shootout 3–2 after Baggio, who had been playing with the aid of a pain-killer injection and a heavily bandaged hamstring, missed the final penalty kick of the match, shooting over the crossbar.

== Euro 2000 runners-up (1996–2000) ==
Italy, still led by Sacchi, qualified for Euro 1996 in England, but did not progress beyond the group stage. Having defeated Russia 2–1 and losing by the same score against the Czech Republic, Italy required a victory in their final group match against Germany to progress to the quarter-finals. However, Gianfranco Zola failed to convert a decisive penalty in a 0–0 draw against the Germans, who eventually won the tournament.

Finishing second behind England in the qualification campaign for the 1998 World Cup, Italy booked a place at the final tournament after defeating Russia in a play-off, with Pierluigi Casiraghi scoring the winning goal in a 2–1 aggregate victory on 15 November 1997. After finishing first in their group and overcoming Norway in the second round, Italy faced a penalty shoot-out in the quarterfinals, for the third World Cup in a row. The Italian side, where Alessandro Del Piero and Baggio renewed the controversial staffetta (lit. 'relay') between Mazzola and Rivera from 1970, held the eventual world champions and host team, France, to a 0–0 draw after extra time, but lost 4–3 in the shoot-out. With two goals scored in this tournament, Baggio remains the only Italian player to have scored in three different FIFA World Cups.

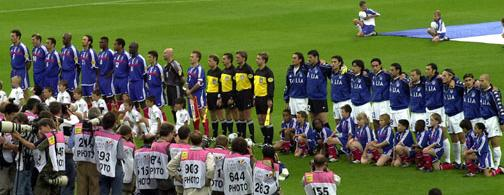
Italy (right) line-up ahead of the UEFA Euro 2000 Final against France

Two years later, at the Euro 2000, with four consecutive victories the team led by former captain Dino Zoff made it all the way to the semifinals, facing another penalty shoot-out but emerging victorious over the co-hosts, the Netherlands. Italian goalkeeper Francesco Toldo saved one penalty during the match and two in the shootout, while striker Francesco Totti scored his penalty with a cucchiaio (lit. 'spoon') chip. Italy finished the tournament as runners-up, losing the final 2–1 against France (to a golden goal in extra time) after conceding an equalising goal just 30 seconds before the expected end of injury time. After the defeat, coach Dino Zoff resigned in protest after being criticised by AC Milan club president and politician Silvio Berlusconi.

== Trapattoni years (2000–2004) ==
Giovanni Trapattoni took charge of the team in July 2000 following the resignation of Dino Zoff. Playing in Group 8 of the 2002 FIFA World Cup qualification process, Italy finished undefeated after facing Romania, Georgia, Hungary and Lithuania. In the final tournament, a 2–0 victory against Ecuador with a double from Christian Vieri was followed by a series of controversial matches. During the match against Croatia, English referee Graham Poll incorrectly disallowed two regular goals resulting in a 2–1 defeat to Italy. Despite two goals being ruled for offsides, a late headed goal from Alessandro Del Piero helped Italy to a 1–1 draw with Mexico, proving enough to advance to the knockout stages.

Co-host country South Korea eliminated Italy in the round of 16 by a score of 2–1. The match proved controversial with members of the Italian team, most notably striker Francesco Totti and coach Giovanni Trapattoni, suggesting a conspiracy to eliminate Italy from the competition. Trapattoni even obliquely accused FIFA of ordering the official to ensure a Korean victory so that one of the two host nations would remain in the tournament. The most contentious decisions by the game referee Byron Moreno were an early penalty awarded to South Korea (saved by Buffon), a golden goal by Damiano Tommasi incorrectly ruled offside, and the sending off of Totti after being presented with a second yellow card for an alleged dive in the penalty area. FIFA president Sepp Blatter stated that the linesmen had been a "disaster" and admitted that Italy suffered from bad offside calls during the group matches, but he denied conspiracy allegations. While questioning Totti's sending off by Moreno, Blatter refused to blame Italy's loss entirely on the referees, stating: "Italy's elimination is not only down to referees and linesmen who made human not premeditated errors. Italy made mistakes both in defense and in attack."

Trapattoni stayed on and guided the team at Euro 2004 in Portugal, where after draws against Denmark and Sweden along with a victory over Bulgaria in Group C, Italy were eliminated following a three-way five point tie based on the number of goals scored in matches among the tied teams. Goalkeeper Gianluigi Buffon and then Italian football federation president Franco Carraro accused the Swedish and Danish teams of fixing the result of their final match (2-2 was the result which consented both teams to advance). Despite calls, then-UEFA spokesperson Robert Faulkner said the organization would not investigate the result.

== 2006 World Cup victory ==
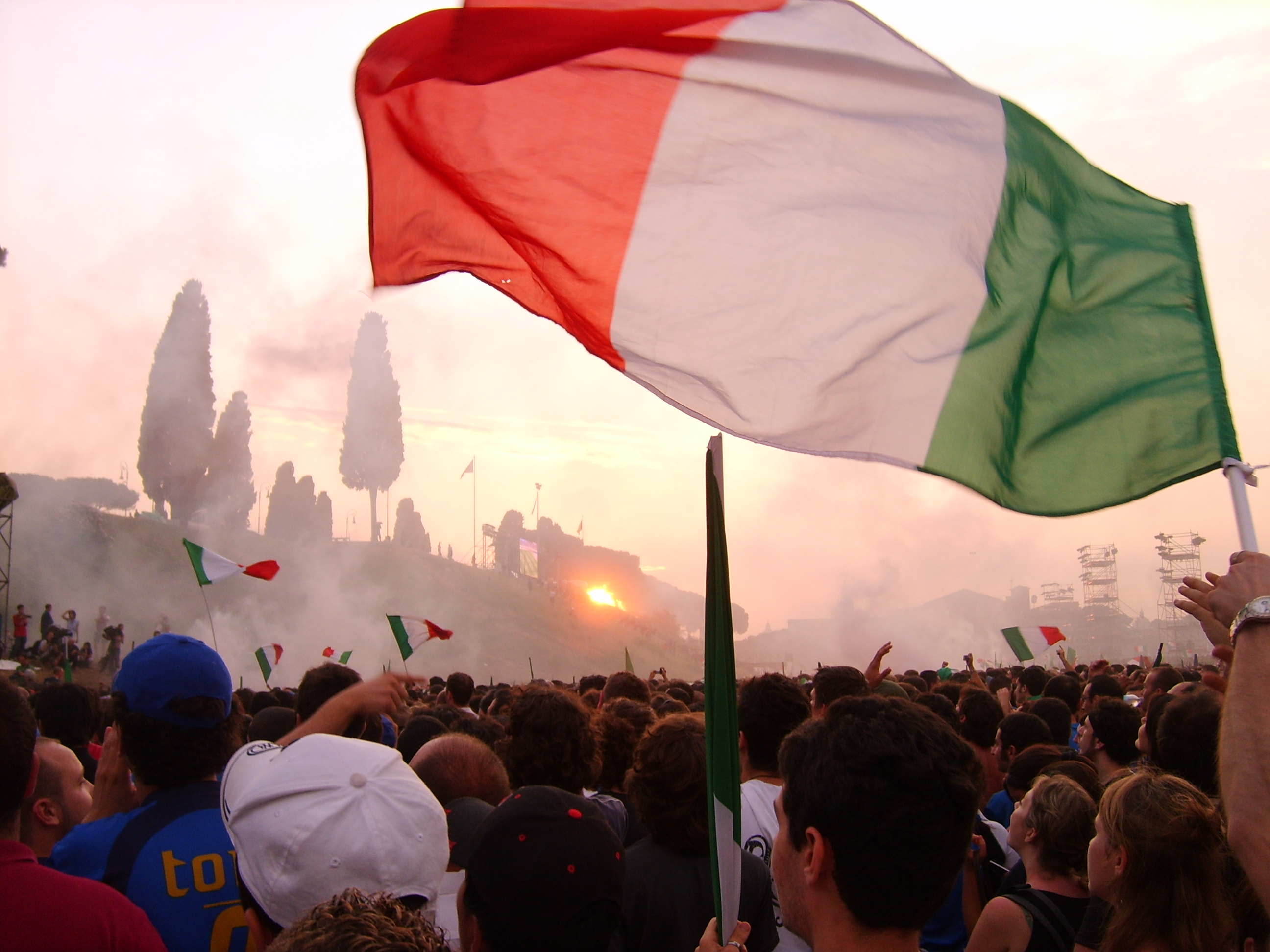
The crowd at Circus Maximus in Rome, after Italy scored against France

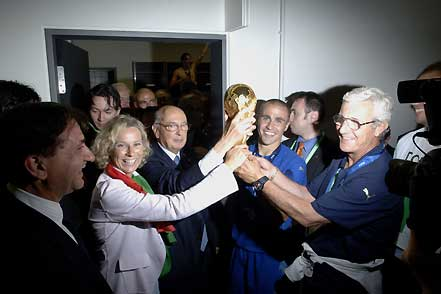
Italian President Giorgio Napolitano congratulates coach Lippi and captain Cannavaro after the final match against France.

The Italian Football Federation replaced Trapattoni with Marcello Lippi. With controversy plaguing the domestic league, Italy entered the 2006 World Cup as one of the eight seeded teams. Italy finished first in Group E with wins against Ghana and the Czech Republic and a draw with the United States. In the round of 16, Italy secured a 1–0 victory over Australia with Francesco Totti scoring a penalty. Italy overcame Ukraine, 3–0, after taking an early lead through Gianluca Zambrotta and additional goals coming from Luca Toni. In the semi-finals, Italy beat hosts Germany 2–0 with goals Fabio Grosso and Alessandro Del Piero in the last minutes of extra time.

On 9 July 2006, the Azzurri won their fourth World Cup title after defeating France in the final. French captain Zinedine Zidane opened the scoring from the penalty spot in the seventh minute before Marco Materazzi scored from a corner kick, twelve minutes later. The score remained level and during extra-time and Zidane was sent off for headbutting Materazzi. Italy went on to win the penalty shootout 5–3, with all Italian players scoring their kicks. The decisive penalty goal was scored by Grosso.

FIFA named seven Italian players — Gianluigi Buffon, Fabio Cannavaro, Gianluca Zambrotta, Andrea Pirlo, Gennaro Gattuso, Francesco Totti and Luca Toni — to the 23-man tournament All Star Team. Buffon also won the Lev Yashin Award, given to the best goalkeeper of the tournament; he conceded only two goals in the tournament's seven matches, the first an own goal by Zaccardo and the second from Zidane's penalty kick in the final, and remained unbeaten for 460 consecutive minutes. In honour of Italy winning a fourth World Cup, members of the squad were awarded the Italian Order of Merit of Cavaliere.

== The decline of the world champions (2006–2010) ==
Marcello Lippi, who had announced his resignation three days after the World Cup triumph, was replaced by Roberto Donadoni. Italy qualified for Euro 2008 by winning their group ahead of France. On 14 February 2007, Italy climbed to first in the FIFA World Rankings for the second time. At Euro 2008, the Azzurri lost 3–0 to the Netherlands in the opening match of the group stage. The following game against Romania ended 1–1 thanks to a penalty save from Gianluigi Buffon. Italy would win their final group game against France 2–0, a rematch of the 2006 World Cup final. The Azzurri were eliminated in the quarter-finals on penalties to eventual champions Spain. Within a week of the game, Roberto Donadoni's contract was terminated and Marcello Lippi was rehired as coach.

Italy qualified for their first ever FIFA Confederations Cup held in South Africa in June 2009 by virtue of winning the 2006 World Cup. They won their opening match of the tournament against the United States, but subsequent defeats to Egypt and Brazil meant that they finished third in the group on goals scored (points level with the US and Egypt), and were eliminated.

At the 2010 World Cup in South Africa, reigning champions Italy were unexpectedly eliminated in the first round, finishing last place in their group. After being held to 1–1 draws with Paraguay and New Zealand needing equalizers in both games, they suffered a 3–2 loss to Slovakia having trailed 2-0 and 3-1. It was the first time Italy failed to win a single game at a World Cup tournament, and in doing so became only the third nation to be eliminated in the first round while being reigning World Cup champions.

== Euro 2012 runners-up and fluctuating results (2010–2018) ==
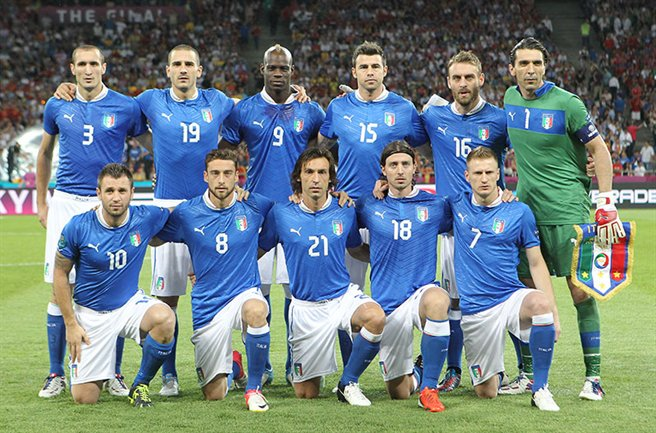
The national football team of Italy before the UEFA Euro 2012 final, Olympic Stadium, Kyiv, 1 July 2012

Marcello Lippi stepped down after Italy's World Cup campaign and was replaced by Cesare Prandelli, although Lippi's successor had already been announced before the tournament.

At UEFA Euro 2012, Italy finished second in their group behind Spain, which earned them a quarter-final tie against England. After a mostly one-sided affair in which Italy failed to take their chances, they managed to beat England on penalties. In the semi-final against Germany, two first-half goals by Mario Balotelli saw the Italians through to the final. In the final, Italy fell to a 4–0 defeat to Spain.

During the 2013 Confederations Cup in Brazil, Italy reached the semi-finals, losing 7–6 on penalties to Spain. Italy did manage to beat Uruguay in the third place play-off. At the 2014 FIFA World Cup, Italy defeated England 2–1 in their first match before succumbing to underdogs Costa Rica 1–0 in the second group stage match. In Italy's last group match, they were knocked out by Uruguay 1–0, in a controversial match, where Italian player Claudio Marchisio was controversially sent off whilst Uruguay's Luis Suárez bit Italy's Giorgio Chiellini without any sanction. Shortly after this loss, coach Cesare Prandelli resigned.

Former Juventus manager Antonio Conte was selected to replace Prandelli. On 10 October 2015, Italy qualified for Euro 2016, courtesy of a 3–1 win over Azerbaijan; the result meant that Italy had gone 50 games unbeaten in European qualifiers. On 4 April 2016, it was announced that Antonio Conte would step down as Italy coach after Euro 2016 to become head coach of Chelsea. The 23-man squad was initially criticised by many fans and members of the media for its lack of quality, which saw notable absences, such as Andrea Pirlo and Sebastian Giovinco being controversially left out. Italy opened Euro 2016 with a 2–0 victory over Belgium and qualified thanks to a win against Sweden in the second match, which made their defeat 1–0 to Ireland in the final group stage match irrelevant for access to the round of 16. Italy subsequently defeated reigning European champions Spain 2–0 in the round of 16. However, Italy were defeated by reigning world champions Germany in the quarter-finals on penalties, after a 1–1 draw.

== Failure to qualify for 2018 World Cup ==
After Conte's planned departure following Euro 2016, Gian Piero Ventura took over as manager for the team. During qualification for the 2018 World Cup, Italy finished second in Group G, five points behind Spain. Italy would compete in the play-off round against Sweden, where they lost 1–0 on aggregate and therefore eliminated; the first time that Italy had failed to qualify for the World Cup since 1958. Following the match, veterans Andrea Barzagli, Daniele De Rossi and captain Gianluigi Buffon all declared their retirement from the national team. On 15 November 2017, Ventura was dismissed as head coach, and on 20 November 2017, Carlo Tavecchio resigned as president of the Italian Football Federation. Luigi Di Biagio was called as caretaker manager and led the team in subsequent friendlies in March 2018, including the last of Buffon's 176 appearances in a friendly against Argentina.

== Second European title (2018–2021) ==
On 14 May 2018, Roberto Mancini was announced as the new manager. On 16 August 2018, in the first FIFA World Rankings update that followed the World Cup, Italy dropped to their lowest-ever ranking of 21st. On 18 November 2019, Italy finished Euro 2020 qualifying with ten wins in all ten matches, becoming only the sixth side to qualify for a European Championship with a perfect record. On 17 March 2020, UEFA confirmed that Euro 2020 would be postponed by one year due to the COVID-19 pandemic.

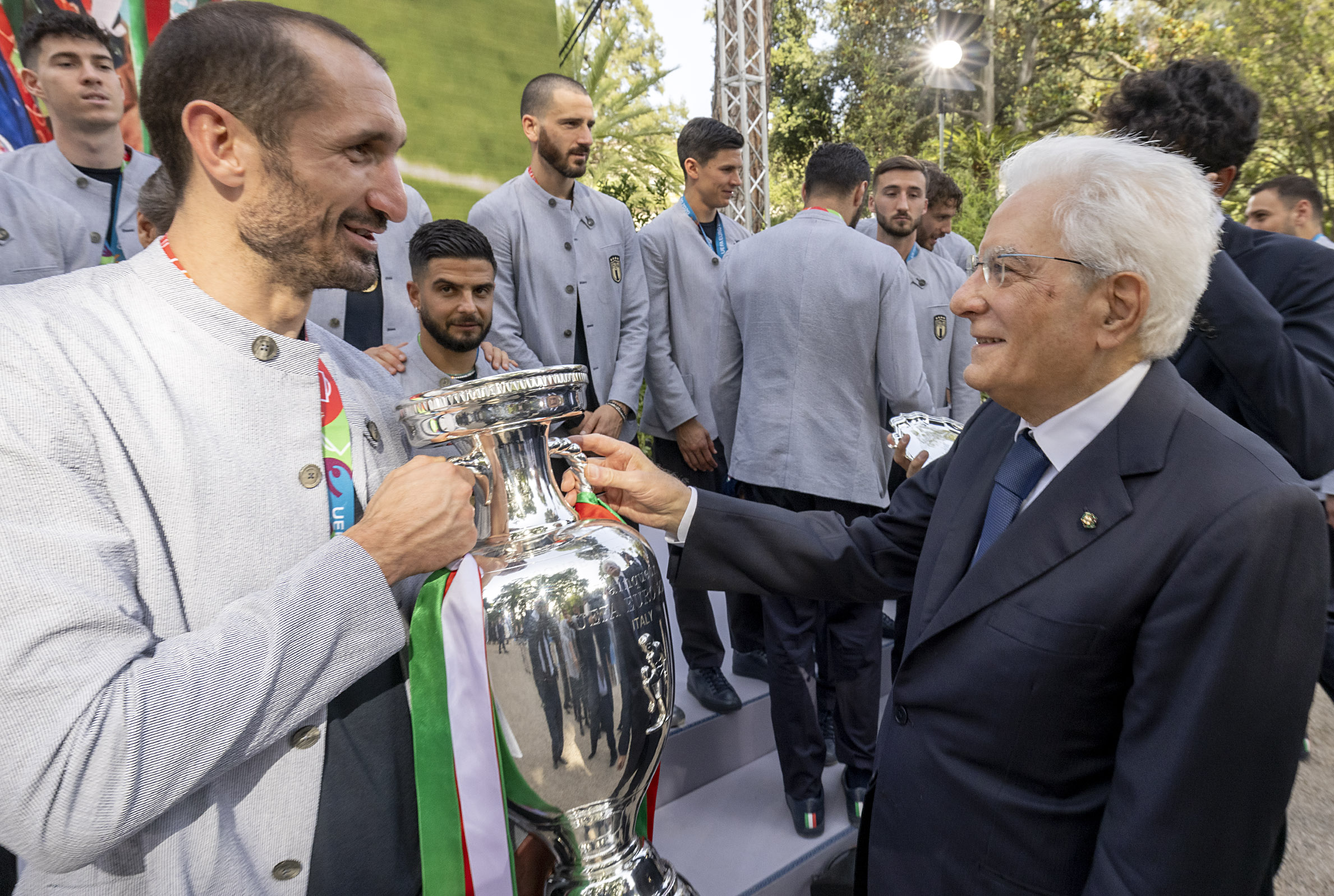
President of Italy Sergio Mattarella (right) congratulates captain Chiellini in Rome, the day after Italy's triumph at UEFA Euro 2020.

At the delayed Euro 2020, Italy finished top of Group A, ahead of Turkey, Switzerland, and Wales. Being one of the host nations, Italy played all three group games at Rome's Stadio Olimpico, and it became the first team in European Championship history to win each group stage match without conceding. In the round of 16, Italy defeated Austria 2–1 at Wembley Stadium after extra time. In the quarter-finals, Italy secured a 2–1 victory over Belgium, before beating Spain on penalties in the semi-finals.

In the final, on 11 July 2021, Italy won the European Championship defeating hosts England at Wembley Stadium on penalties after a 1–1 draw, for their second European title and their first since 1968. Goalkeeper Gianluigi Donnarumma also won the Player of the Tournament award, given to the best player of the tournament. On 16 July, all members of the European Championship-winning squad were awarded the Italian Order of Merit of Cavaliere.

In October 2021, Italy participated in the UEFA Nations League Finals as hosts, and lost the semi-final against Spain, 2–1 at the San Siro. This match meant the end of the record 37-game unbeaten run and the first defeat for Italy in more than three years. Four days later, Italy won the third-place play-off, 2–1 against Belgium.

== Failure to qualify for 2022 World Cup and disappointment at Euro 2024 ==
On 15 November 2021, Italy drew 0–0 with Northern Ireland in their final 2022 World Cup qualifying match and finished in second place, two points behind Switzerland. On 24 March 2022, Italy lost 1–0 in the semi-final of the play-offs against North Macedonia, their first-ever World Cup qualifying home defeat, therefore, failing to qualify for the World Cup for a second consecutive time.

On 1 June 2022, Italy took part in the CONMEBOL–UEFA Cup of Champions match, rebranded as the 2022 Finalissima, losing 3–0 against defending Copa América champion Argentina. In September Italy qualified for the 2023 UEFA Nations League Finals after beating Hungary 2–0 in Budapest. On 15 June 2023, Italy played the semi-final against Spain, losing 2–1. Three days later, Italy won the third-place match 3–2 against the Netherlands.

In August 2023, after five years as Italy's coach, Mancini resigned. Luciano Spalletti was chosen as the new coach, and led the team in the last six games of Euro 2024 qualifying, managing to achieve direct qualification to the European Championship. Italy were eliminated from the tournament in the round of 16 following a 2–0 loss to Switzerland, leading the minister for Sport Andrea Abodi to call the Euro campaign a "failure".

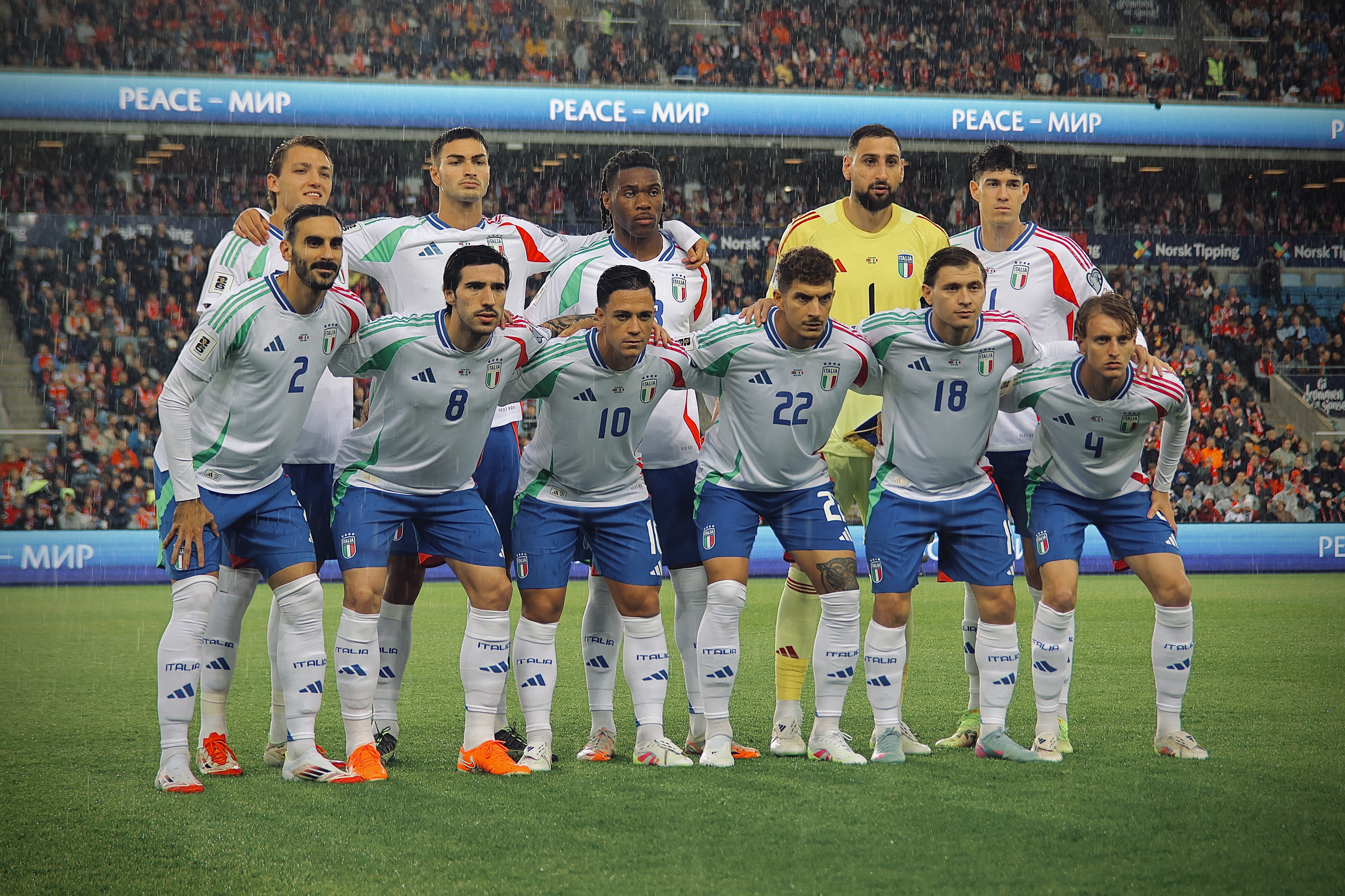
The Italy XI that were defeated by Norway in June 2025.

== Failure to qualify for 2026 World Cup ==
In June 2025, after a 3–0 defeat against Norway in the first match of the 2026 FIFA World Cup qualifiers, Spalletti was relieved from his duties, and former 2006 World Cup champion Gennaro Gattuso took his place. Gattuso's debut as Italy's commissario tecnico came on 5 September in a 5–0 win against Estonia. In November of the same year, Italy qualified for the play-offs for the third time in a row following a 4–1 home defeat to Norway. Italy were drawn into Path A of the play-offs, hosting Northern Ireland in the semi-final and traveling to the winner of Wales and Bosnia and Herzegovina in the final. On 27 March 2026, Italy defeated Northern Ireland in the semi-final 2–0 to advance to the final. Days later, on 31 March 2026, Italy failed to qualify for the 2026 FIFA World Cup after losing to Bosnia and Herzegovina on penalties following a 1–1 draw, marking the third straight World Cup for which they failed to qualify. Two days later, Gabriele Gravina resigned as President of the FIGC. A day later, Gattuso resigned as head coach of the Italy national team. On 10 April, Silvio Baldini was named caretaker manager for Italy’s June friendlies.

== Kit history ==
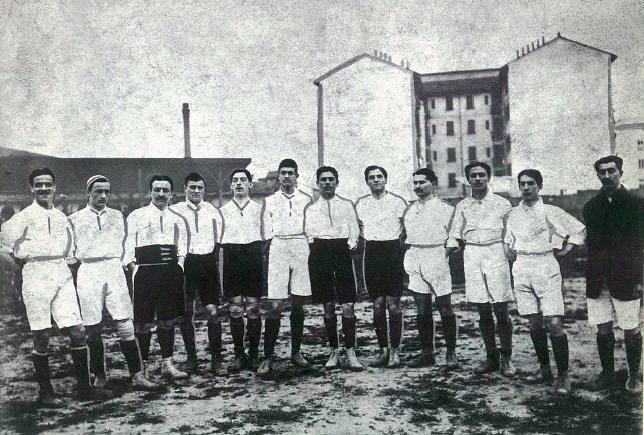
Italy in 1910, wearing the original white jersey. They would switch to the traditional blue shirt a year later.

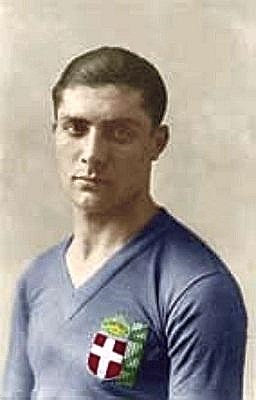
Giuseppe Meazza in the early 1930s wearing Italy's blue shirt with the cross of the House of Savoy badge along with the fascist lictorial symbol.

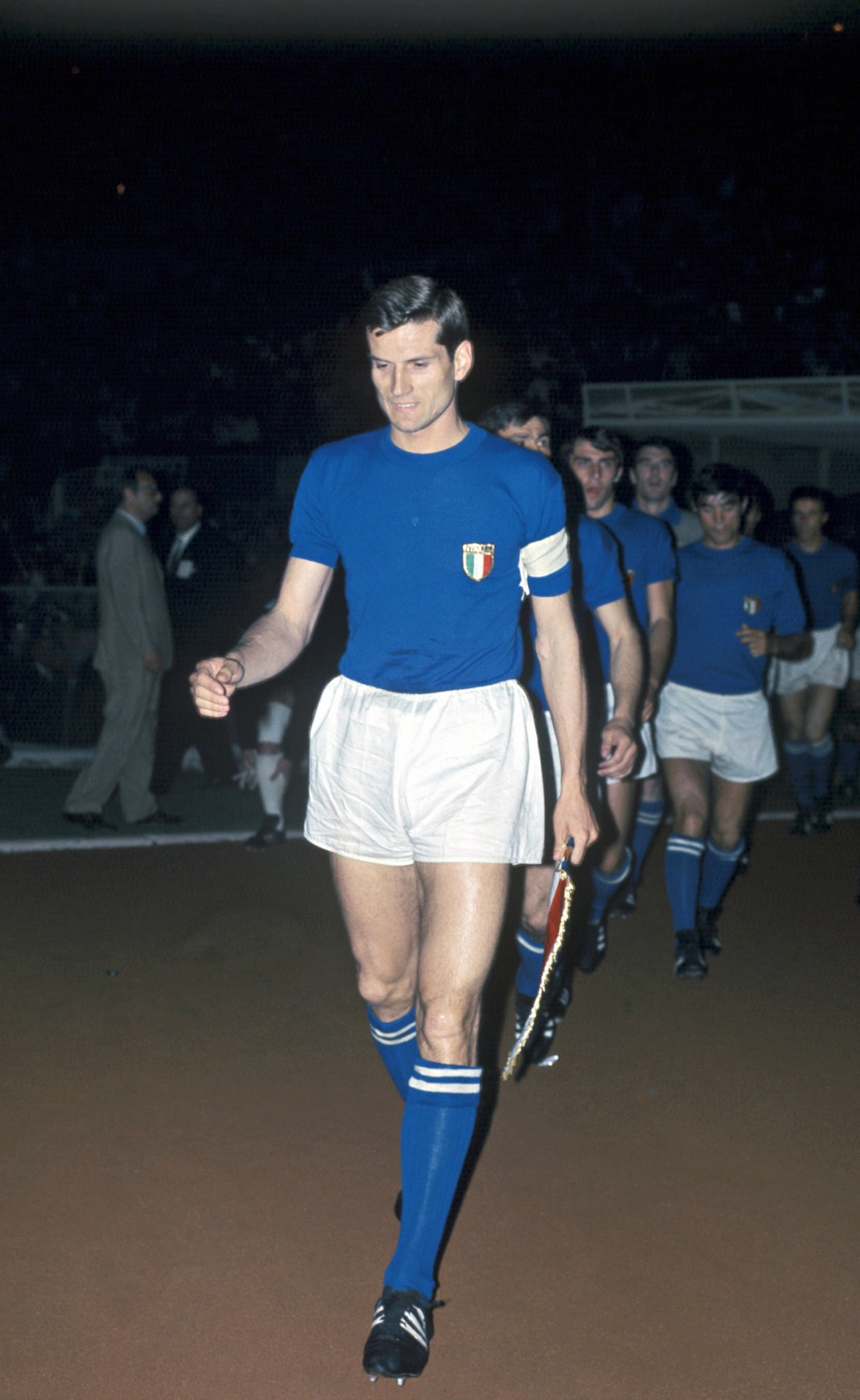
Giacinto Facchetti wearing the classic Italian uniform in 1968: blue shirt, white shorts and blue socks and the tricolour badge.

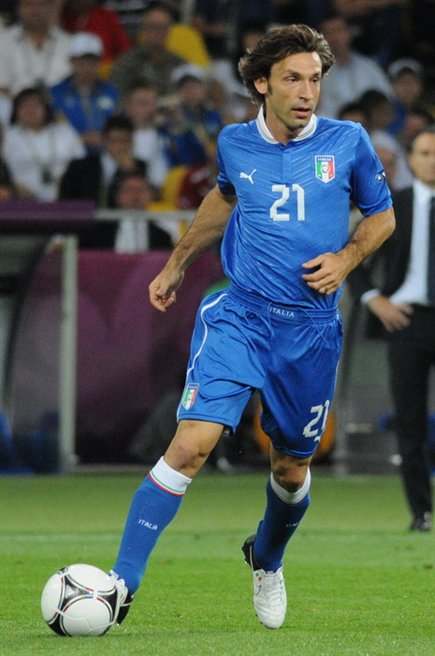
Andrea Pirlo in at UEFA Euro 2012, wearing the completely blue kit, a colour scheme often used by the national team since the 2000s.

The first shirt worn by the Italy national team, in its debut against France on 15 May 1910, was white. The choice of colour was due to the fact that a decision about the appearance of the kit had not yet been made, so it was decided not to have a colour, which was why white was chosen. After two games, for a friendly against Hungary in Milan on 6 January 1911, the white shirt was replaced by a blue jersey (specifically Savoy azure) — blue being the border colour of the royal House of Savoy crest used on the flag of the Kingdom of Italy; the shirt was accompanied by white shorts and black socks (which later became blue). The team later became known as gli Azzurri (the Blues).

In the 1930s, Italy wore a black kit, ordered by the fascist regime of Benito Mussolini. The black kit debuted on 17 February 1935 in a friendly against France at the Stadio Nazionale PNF in Rome. A blue shirt, white shorts and black socks were, however, worn at the 1936 Olympic Games in Berlin the following year. At the 1938 FIFA World Cup in France, the all-black kit was worn once (in the match against France).

After World War II, the fascist regime fell and the monarchy was abolished in 1946. The same year saw the birth of the Italian Republic, and the blue-and-white kit was reinstated. The cross of the former Royal House of Savoy was removed from the flag of Italy, and consequently from the national team's badge, now consisting solely of the Tricolore. For the 1954 FIFA World Cup, the country's name in Italian, "ITALIA", was placed above the tricolour shield, and for the 1982 FIFA World Cup, "FIGC", the abbreviation of the Italian Football Federation, was incorporated into the badge.

In 1983, to celebrate the victory at the World Cup of the previous year, three gold stars replaced the word "ITALIA" above the tricolour, representing their three World Cup victories until that point. And in 1984, a round emblem was launched, featuring the three stars, the inscriptions "ITALIA" and "FIGC", and the tricolour.

The first known kit manufacturer was Adidas in 1974. Since 2003, the kit has been made by Puma. Since the 2000s, an all-blue uniform including blue shorts has occasionally been used, particularity in international tournaments. After Italy's 2006 World Cup victory, a fourth star was added to the tricolour badge. In March 2022, after almost 20 years with Puma, it was announced that Adidas will be Italy's kit manufacturer from 2023.

=== Kit suppliers ===
Kit supplier	Period
None	1910–1974
(Germany) Adidas	1974–1978
(Italy) Baila	1978–1979
(France) Le Coq Sportif	1979–1984
(Italy) Ennerre	1984–1985
(Italy) Diadora	1985–1994
(United States) Nike	1994–1999
(Italy) Kappa	1999–2003
(Germany) Puma	2003–2022
(Germany) Adidas	2023–

== Previous squads ==
World Cup

- 1934 FIFA World Cup squad
- 1938 FIFA World Cup squad
- 1950 FIFA World Cup squad
- 1954 FIFA World Cup squad
- 1962 FIFA World Cup squad
- 1966 FIFA World Cup squad
- 1970 FIFA World Cup squad
- 1974 FIFA World Cup squad
- 1978 FIFA World Cup squad
- 1982 FIFA World Cup squad
- 1986 FIFA World Cup squad
- 1990 FIFA World Cup squad
- 1994 FIFA World Cup squad
- 1998 FIFA World Cup squad
- 2002 FIFA World Cup squad
- 2006 FIFA World Cup squad
- 2010 FIFA World Cup squad
- 2014 FIFA World Cup squad

European Championship

- UEFA Euro 1968 squad
- UEFA Euro 1980 squad
- UEFA Euro 1988 squad
- UEFA Euro 1996 squad
- UEFA Euro 2000 squad
- UEFA Euro 2004 squad
- UEFA Euro 2008 squad
- UEFA Euro 2012 squad
- UEFA Euro 2016 squad
- UEFA Euro 2020 squad
- UEFA Euro 2024 squad

Confederations Cup

- 2009 FIFA Confederations Cup squad
- 2013 FIFA Confederations Cup squad

Nations League Finals

- 2021 UEFA Nations League Finals squad
- 2023 UEFA Nations League Finals squad
