= France–Italy football rivalry =

Football rivalry between the national football teams of France and Italy

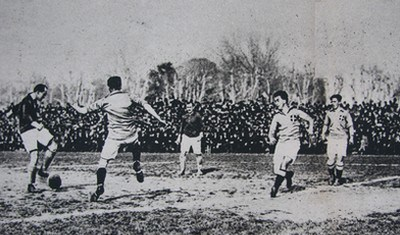
- France–Italy match on 20 February 1921
- Location: Europe
- Teams: France; Italy
- First meeting: 15 May 1910; Friendly; Italy 6–2 France
- Latest meeting: 12 November 2026; UEFA Nations League; Italy 3–1 France
- Next meeting: TBD

Statistics
- Total meetings: 43
- Most wins: Italy (20)
- All-time series: Italy: 20; Draw: 11; France: 12
- Largest victory: Italy 7–0 France; Friendly (22 March 1925)
- Largest goal scoring: Italy 9–4 France; Friendly (18 January 1920)

The national football teams of Italy and France are rivals, having achieved six FIFA World Cups and four UEFA European Championships between the two countries. Italy has won four FIFA World Cups in 1934, 1938, 1982, and 2006, while France has won two FIFA World Cups in 1998 and 2018.

For many years Italy dominated (before 1982: 17 wins, three losses, and six draws), while from 1982, the French team had not lost one regulation game against Italy (with five wins and four draws) until the 2006 World Cup final, which Italy won 5–3 on penalties after a 1–1 draw, however, FIFA considers it a draw. France did, however, lose the UEFA Euro 2008 Group C match against Italy 2–0.

The two countries also met in the final of the 2000 European Championship, won by France with an extra-time golden goal by David Trezeguet.

== List of matches ==
#	Date	Location	Competition	Winner	Score
1	15 May 1910	(Italy) Milan	Friendly	Italy	6–2
2	9 April 1911	(France) Saint-Ouen	Friendly	(draw)	2–2
3	17 March 1912	(Italy) Turin	Friendly	France	4–3
4	12 January 1913	(France) Saint-Ouen	Friendly	France	1–0
5	29 March 1914	(Italy) Turin	Friendly	Italy	2–0
6	18 January 1920	(Italy) Milan	Friendly	Italy	9–4
7	29 August 1920	(Belgium) Antwerp	1920 Summer Olympics	France	3–1
8	20 February 1921	(France) Marseille	Friendly	Italy	2–1
9	22 March 1925	(Italy) Turin	Friendly	Italy	7–0
10	24 April 1927	(France) Colombes	Friendly	(draw)	3–3
11	29 May 1928	(Netherlands) Amsterdam	1928 Summer Olympics	Italy	4–3
12	25 January 1931	(Italy) Bologna	Friendly	Italy	5–0
13	10 April 1932	(France) Colombes	Friendly	Italy	2–1
14	17 February 1935	(Italy) Rome	Friendly	Italy	2–1
15	5 December 1937	(France) Paris	Friendly	(draw)	0–0
16	12 June 1938	(France) Colombes	1938 World Cup	Italy	3–1
17	4 December 1938	(Italy) Naples	Friendly	Italy	1–0
18	4 April 1948	(France) Colombes	Friendly	Italy	3–1
19	3 June 1951	(Italy) Genoa	Friendly	Italy	4–1
20	11 April 1954	(France) Colombes	Friendly	Italy	3–1
21	5 May 1956	(Italy) Bologna	Friendly	Italy	2–0
22	9 November 1958	(France) Colombes	Friendly	(draw)	2–2
23	5 May 1962	(Italy) Florence	Friendly	Italy	2–1
24	19 March 1966	(France) Paris	Friendly	(draw)	0–0
25	8 February 1978	(Italy) Naples	Friendly	(draw)	2–2
26	2 June 1978	(Argentina) Mar del Plata	1978 World Cup	Italy	2–1
27	23 February 1982	(France) Paris	Friendly	France	2–0
28	17 June 1986	Mexico City	1986 World Cup	France	2–0
29	16 February 1994	(Italy) Naples	Friendly	France	1–0
30	11 June 1997	(France) Paris	Tournoi de France	(draw)	2–2
31	3 July 1998	(France) Saint-Denis	1998 World Cup	France	0–0 (a.e.t.) (4–3 p)
32	2 July 2000	(Netherlands) Rotterdam	Euro 2000	France	2–1 (a.e.t.)
33	9 July 2006	(Germany) Berlin	2006 World Cup	Italy	1–1 (a.e.t.) (5–3 p)
34	6 September 2006	(France) Saint-Denis	2008 Euro qualifier	France	3–1
35	8 September 2007	(Italy) Milan	2008 Euro qualifier	(draw)	0–0
36	17 June 2008	(Switzerland) Zürich	Euro 2008	Italy	2–0
37	14 November 2012	(Italy) Parma	Friendly	France	2–1
38	1 September 2016	(Italy) Bari	Friendly	France	3–1
39	1 June 2018	(France) Nice	Friendly	France	3–1
40	6 September 2024	(France) Paris	2024–25 Nations League	Italy	3–1
41	17 November 2024	(Italy) Milan	2024–25 Nations League	France	3–1
42	2 October 2026	(France) Saint-Denis	2026–27 Nations League	(draw)	1–1
43	12 November 2026	(Italy) Milan	2026–27 Nations League	Italy	3–1

== Comparison of France's and Italy's positions in major international tournaments ==
Key

Denotes which team finished better in that particular competition.
DNQ: Did not qualify.
DNP: Did not participate.
TBD: To be determined.

Tournament	France	Italy	Notes
1930 FIFA World Cup	7th	DNP	
1934 FIFA World Cup	9th	1st	Tournament played in Italy.
1938 FIFA World Cup	6th	1st	Tournament played in France. In the quarter-finals, Italy defeated France 3–1.
1950 FIFA World Cup	DNP	7th	
1954 FIFA World Cup	11th	10th	
1958 FIFA World Cup	3rd	DNQ	
Euro 1960	4th	DNP	Tournament played in France.
1962 FIFA World Cup	DNQ	9th	
Euro 1964	DNQ		
1966 FIFA World Cup	13th	9th	
Euro 1968	DNQ	1st	Tournament played in Italy.
1970 FIFA World Cup	DNQ	2nd	
Euro 1972	DNQ	DNQ	
1974 FIFA World Cup	DNQ	10th	
Euro 1976	DNQ	DNQ	
1978 FIFA World Cup	12th	4th	France and Italy were placed in the same first round group. Italy defeated France 2–1, in the match between the two teams, as France did not progress out of the group.
Euro 1980	DNQ	4th	Tournament played in Italy.
1982 FIFA World Cup	4th	1st	
Euro 1984	1st	DNQ	Tournament played in France.
1986 FIFA World Cup	3rd	12th	In the round of 16, France defeated Italy 2–0.
Euro 1988	DNQ	4th	
1990 FIFA World Cup	DNQ	3rd	Tournament played in Italy.
Euro 1992	6th	DNQ	
1994 FIFA World Cup	DNQ	2nd	
Euro 1996	3rd	10th	
1998 FIFA World Cup	1st	5th	In the quarter-finals, France defeated Italy 4–3 on penalties after extra time. Tournament played in France.
Euro 2000	1st	2nd	In the final, France defeated Italy 2–1 with a golden goal in extra time.
2002 FIFA World Cup	28th	15th	
Euro 2004	6th	9th	
2006 FIFA World Cup	2nd	1st	In the final, Italy defeated France 5–3 on penalties.
Euro 2008	15th	8th	France and Italy were placed in the same first round group. Italy defeated France 2–0, in the match between the two teams, as France did not progress out of the group.
2010 FIFA World Cup	29th	26th	Both defending finalists were eliminated in the group stage, the first time this occurred.
Euro 2012	8th	2nd	
2014 FIFA World Cup	7th	22nd	
Euro 2016	2nd	5th	Tournament played in France.
2018 FIFA World Cup	1st	DNQ	
Euro 2020	11th	1st	Some games of the tournament played in Italy.
2022 FIFA World Cup	2nd	DNQ	
Euro 2024	3rd	14th	
2026 FIFA World Cup	4th	DNQ	
Euro 2028	TBD	TBD	

== Major encounters ==
=== 1938 FIFA World Cup ===
On 12 June, France and Italy were matched up in the quarter-final of the 1938 FIFA World Cup, which ended 3–1 in favour of Italy with goals by Gino Colaussi in the 9th minute and two goals by Silvio Piola in the 51st and 72nd minute, with France's only goal coming from Oscar Heisserer in the 10th minute, as France were eliminated (being the first World Cup's hosts to fail to win the tournament at home). Italy went on to win their second World Cup title in succession.

12 June 1938
17:00 WEST

France	1–3	Italy
Heisserer 10'	Report	Colaussi 9'; Piola 51', 72'

Stade Olympique de Colombes, Paris
Attendance: 58,455
Referee: Louis Baert (Belgium)

=== 1978 FIFA World Cup ===
On 2 June, Italy and France met in the first group stage match of the 1978 FIFA World Cup, which ended 2–1 for Italy after goals by Paolo Rossi in the 29th minute and Renato Zaccarelli in the 54th minute, although France scored first in the 1st minute of play with a goal by Bernard Lacombe. Italy later made it out of the group, but France did not.

2 June 1978
13:45 ART

Italy	2–1	France
Rossi 29'; Zaccarelli 54'	Report	Lacombe 1'

Estadio José María Minella, Mar del Plata
Attendance: 38,100
Referee: Nicolae Rainea (Romania)

=== 1986 FIFA World Cup ===
On 17 June, Italy and France met in the round of 16 of the 1986 FIFA World Cup, which ended with France eliminating Italy from the tournament 2–0 with goals by Michel Platini in the 15th minute and Yannick Stopyra in the 57th minute.

17 June 1986
12:00 CST

Italy	0–2	France
	Report	Platini 15'; Stopyra 57'

Estadio Olímpico Universitario, Mexico City
Attendance: 70,000
Referee: Carlos Espósito (Argentina)

=== 1998 FIFA World Cup ===
On 3 July, Italy and France were matched up for a quarter-final of the 1998 FIFA World Cup, which ended in a goalless draw after 120 minutes. In the shoot-out, France won 4–3 to advance and went on to win the 1998 World Cup 3–0 over Brazil.

3 July 1998
16:30 CEST

Italy	0–0 (a.e.t.)	France
	Report
Penalties
R. Baggio (penalty scored); Albertini (penalty missed); Costacurta (penalty scored); Vieri (penalty scored); Di Biagio (penalty missed)	3–4	(penalty scored) Zidane; (penalty missed) Lizarazu; (penalty scored) Trezeguet; (penalty scored) Henry; (penalty scored) Blanc

Stade de France, Saint-Denis
Attendance: 77,000
Referee: Hugh Dallas (Scotland)

=== UEFA Euro 2000 ===
On 2 July, Marco Delvecchio gave Italy the lead in the 55th minute and they held on until the final minute of injury time, when Sylvain Wiltord crashed a low drive past Italian keeper Francesco Toldo to take the game into extra time. France won the game just before half-time in extra-time when Robert Pires cut the ball back for David Trezeguet to blast the golden goal into the top left corner of the net to win the tournament 2–1 for France.

2 July 2000
20:00 CEST

France	2–1 (a.e.t.)	Italy
Wiltord 90+3'; Trezeguet 103'	Report	Delvecchio 55'

Feijenoord Stadion, Rotterdam
Attendance: 48,200
Referee: Anders Frisk (Sweden)

=== 2006 FIFA World Cup ===
On 9 July, France and Italy faced off in the final. Zinedine Zidane opened the scoring by converting a controversial 7th-minute penalty kick, conceded by Marco Materazzi, which glanced off the underside of the crossbar and into the goal. Materazzi then levelled the scores in the 19th minute, a header from six yards following an Andrea Pirlo corner from the right. Both teams had chances to score the winning goal in normal time: Luca Toni hit the crossbar in the 35th minute for Italy, later having a header disallowed for offside, while France were not awarded a possible second penalty in the 53rd minute when Florent Malouda went down in the box after a cover tackle from Gianluca Zambrotta. The reverse angle review anyway clears that there was no penalty and the referee took the right decision. France appeared to be the side with better chances to win because of the higher number of shots on goal. However Italy defended well, making them unable to capitalise, and the score remained at one goal each.

At the end of the regulation time, the score was still level at 1–1, and the match was forced into extra time. Italian keeper Gianluigi Buffon made a potentially game-saving save in extra time when he tipped a Zidane header over the crossbar.

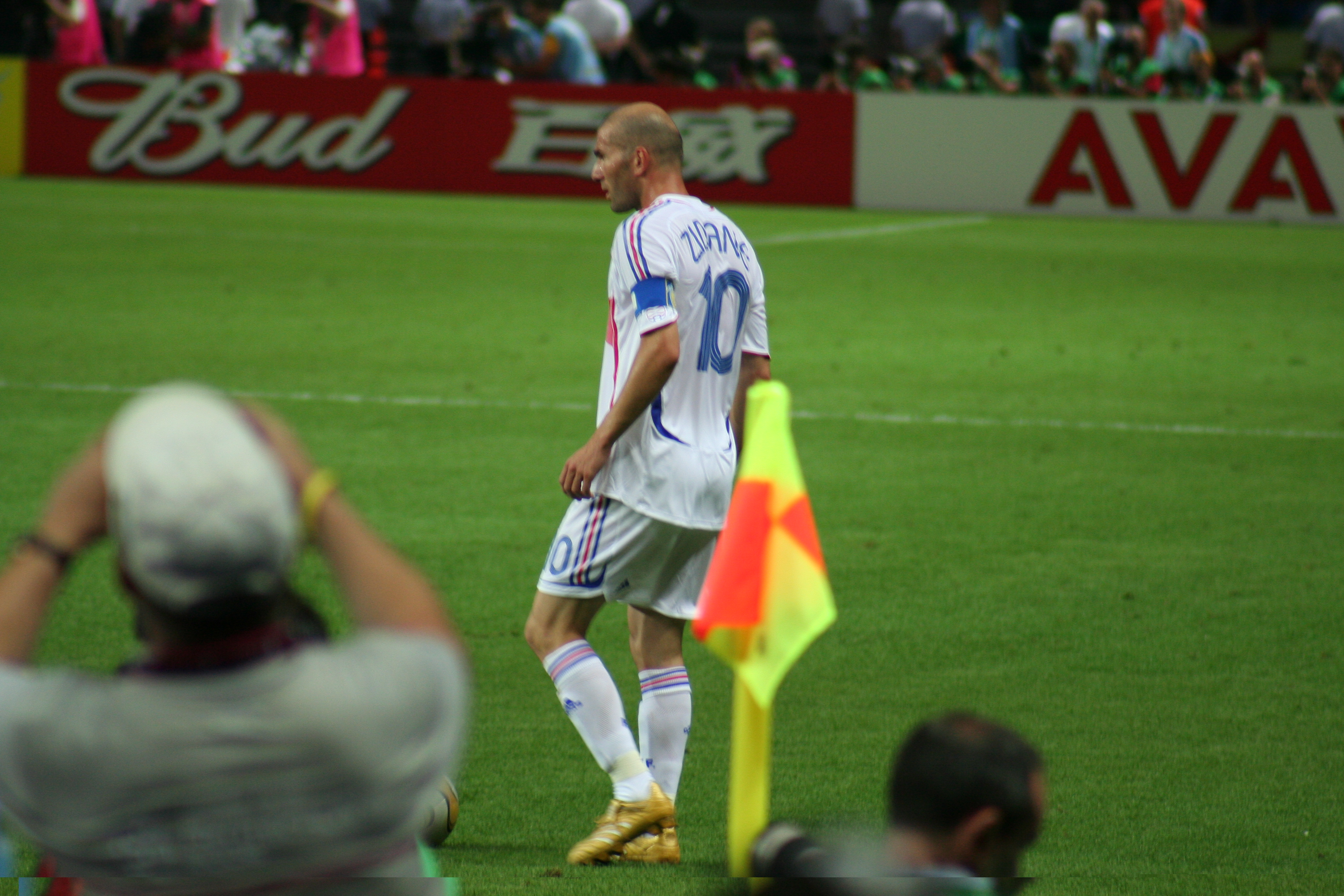
Zinedine Zidane converted a controversial penalty and was sent off for a headbutt in the 2006 FIFA World Cup Final

Almost five minutes into the second half of extra time, Zidane and Materazzi were jogging up the pitch close to each other, they briefly exchanged words after Materazzi was seen tugging at Zidane's jersey before Zidane began to walk away from him. Moments later, Zidane suddenly stopped, turned around and head-butted Materazzi's chest, knocking him to the ground. Although play was halted, referee Horacio Elizondo did not appear to have seen the confrontation. According to match officials' reports, fourth official Luis Medina Cantalejo informed Elizondo of the incident through his headset. After consulting his assistants, Elizondo issued Zidane a red card in the 110th minute.

Despite Italy being one man up for the last ten minutes of extra time, no team managed to score and remained 1–1, as the match went to penalty shoot-out.

The French David Trezeguet was the only player to miss his penalty kick as it hit the crossbar and the ball did not cross the goal line, while Fabio Grosso scored the winner for Italy as the Italians won the shoot-out 5–3.

After the match, Zidane was given the Golden Ball award as the tournament's best player. Fabio Cannavaro and Andrea Pirlo, both from Italy, placed second and third respectively.

9 July 2006
20:00 CEST

Italy	1–1 (a.e.t.)	France
Materazzi 19'	Report	Zidane 7' (pen.)
Penalties
Pirlo (penalty scored); Materazzi (penalty scored); De Rossi (penalty scored); Del Piero (penalty scored); Grosso (penalty scored)	5–3	(penalty scored) Wiltord; (penalty missed) Trezeguet; (penalty scored) Abidal; (penalty scored) Sagnol

Olympiastadion, Berlin
Attendance: 69,000
Referee: Horacio Elizondo (Argentina)

=== UEFA Euro 2008 qualifying ===
Both teams were drawn together in Group B of the UEFA Euro 2008 qualifying. The French beat the Italians 3–1 in Paris before drawing 0–0 in Milan. Both teams qualified for the tournament after Italy beat the nearest group contenders Scotland 2–1.

6 September 2006
21:00 CEST

France	3–1	Italy
Govou 2', 55'; Henry 18'	Report	Gilardino 20'

Stade de France, Saint-Denis
Attendance: 78,831
Referee: Herbert Fandel (Germany)

8 September 2007
20:50 CEST

Italy	0–0	France
	Report

San Siro, Milan
Attendance: 81,200
Referee: Ľuboš Micheľ (Slovakia)

=== UEFA Euro 2008 ===
Italy and France met in the final group stage match of UEFA Euro 2008 on 17 June, having played twice previously in the Euro qualifiers and four times competitively since 2000. Both sides needed a win to have a shot to progress to the next round, but both would be eliminated no matter what if Romania defeated the Netherlands in the other match. Italian goals by Andrea Pirlo from the penalty spot in the 25th minute and Daniele De Rossi in the 62nd minute gave Italy a 2–0 win over France, which allowed them to progress to the quarter-final (as Romania lost to the Netherlands), while France was eliminated.

17 June 2008
20:45 CEST

France	0–2	Italy
	Report	Pirlo 25' (pen.); De Rossi 62'

Letzigrund, Zürich
Attendance: 30,585
Referee: Ľuboš Micheľ (Slovakia)

=== 2024–25 UEFA Nations League ===
Both teams were drawn together in Group 2 of the 2024–25 UEFA Nations League A.

6 September 2024
20:45 CEST

France	1–3	Italy
Barcola 1'	Report	Dimarco 30'; Frattesi 51'; Raspadori 74'

Parc des Princes, Paris
Attendance: 44,956
Referee: Sandro Schärer (Switzerland)

17 November 2024
20:45 CET

Italy	1–3	France
Cambiaso 35'	Report	Rabiot 2', 65'; Vicario 33' (o.g.)

San Siro, Milan
Attendance: 68,158
Referee: Slavko Vinčić (Slovenia)

=== 2026–27 UEFA Nations League ===
Both teams were drawn together in Group 1 of the 2026–27 UEFA Nations League A.

2 October 2026
20:45 CEST

France	1–1	Italy
Olise 55'	Report	Bastoni 68'

Stade de France, Saint-Denis
Attendance: 77,118
Referee: Jesús Gil Manzano (Spain)

12 November 2026
20:45 CET

Italy	3–1	France
P. Esposito 26', 75' (pen.); Frattesi 63'	Report	Olise 10'

San Siro, Milan
Attendance: 71,452
Referee: István Kovács (Romania)

== Statistics ==
=== Overall ===
As of 12 November 2026

	Matches	Wins		Draws	Goals	
	Matches	France	Italy	Draws	France	Italy
FIFA World Cup	5	1	2	2*	5	6
UEFA European Championship	4	2	1	1	5	4
Olympics	2	1	1	0	6	5
UEFA Nations League	4	1	2	1	6	8
All competitions	15	5	6	4	22	23
Friendly	27	7	14	6	38	65
Tournoi de France	1	0	0	1	2	2
All matches	43	12	20	11	62	90

Note: France defeated Italy in a 1998 FIFA World Cup quarter-final match via penalty shoot-out; Italy defeated France in the 2006 FIFA World Cup final via penalty shoot-out.

=== Official titles comparison ===
Senior titles	France	Italy
World Cup	2	4
FIFA Confederations Cup	2	0
Olympics	1	1
Artemio Franchi Trophy	1	0
European Championship	2	2
Nations League	1	0
Total titles	9	7

Note: Only the Olympic Games from 1908 to 1956 are officially recognized by FIFA / IFFHS.

== See also ==
- Football derbies in France
- Football derbies in Italy
- France–Italy relations
