= Italy national football team results =

For lists of Italy national football team results see:

- Italy national football team results (1910–1929)
- Italy national football team results (1930–1949)
- Italy national football team results (1950–1969)
- Italy national football team results (1970–1989)
- Italy national football team results (1990–2009)
- Italy national football team results (2010–present)
- Italy national football team results (unofficial matches)
