= Mario De Simoni =

Italian association football player

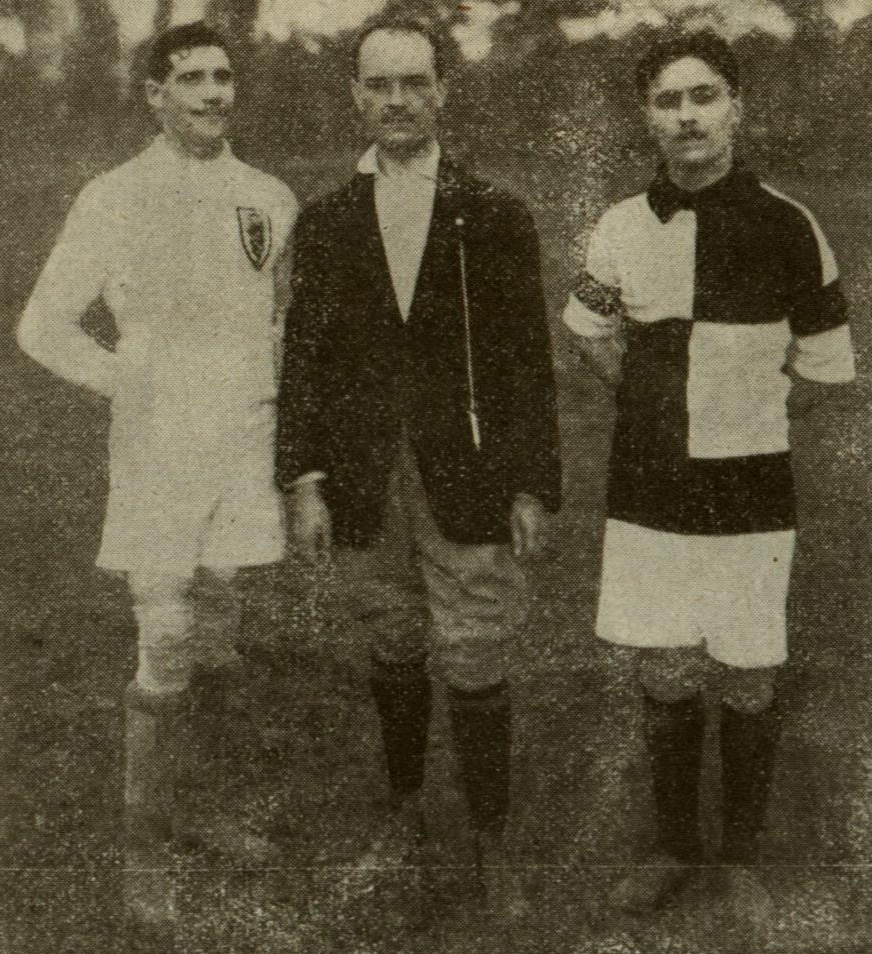

Personal information
- Full name: Mario De Simoni
- Date of birth: 3 November 1887
- Place of birth: Milan, Italy
- Date of death: May 1967 (aged 79)
- Position: Goalkeeper

Senior career*
Years	Team	Apps	(Gls)
1906–1923	US Milanese	123	(0)

International career
1910–1914	Italy	7	(0)

Managerial career
- 1927–1928: Fanfulla
- * Club domestic league appearances and goals

Mario De Simoni (Italian pronunciation: [ˈmaːrjo de siˈmoːni]; 3 November 1887 – May 1967) was an Italian footballer who played as a goalkeeper. He represented the Italy national football team seven times, the first being in Italy's first ever match on 15 May 1910, the occasion of a friendly match against France in a 6–2 home win.
