= Domenico Capello =

Italian footballer (1888-1950)

Personal information
- Date of birth: 1888
- Place of birth: Turin, Kingdom of Italy
- Date of death: 1950 (aged 61–62)
- Place of death: Turin, Italy
- Position: Midfielder

Senior career*
Years	Team	Apps	(Gls)
1909–1910	Piemonte		
1910–1912	Torino	28	(7)
1912–1913	Piemonte		
1913–1915	Juventus	19	(2)

International career
1910	Italy	2	(0)
- * Club domestic league appearances and goals

Domenico Capello (Italian pronunciation: [doˈmeːniko kaˈpɛllo; -ˈpel-]; 1888 – 1950) was an Italian professional footballer who played as a midfielder.

He played in the first ever game of the Italy national football team on 15 May 1910 against France.
