= Arturo Boiocchi =

Italian footballer (1888-1964)

Personal information
- Date of birth: 7 October 1888
- Place of birth: Milan, Kingdom of Italy
- Date of death: 1964
- Place of death: Cormano, Italy
- Position: Striker

Senior career*
Years	Team	Apps	(Gls)
1905–1917	Milanese		
1919–1923	Saronno		
1924–1926	Milanese		

International career
1910–1914	Italy	6	(2)
- * Club domestic league appearances and goals

Arturo Boiocchi (Italian pronunciation: [arˈtuːro boˈjɔkki]; 7 October 1888 – 1964) was an Italian professional footballer who played as a striker.

At club level he played for U.S. Milanese for 15 years.

At international level he played in the first ever game of the Italy national football team on 15 May 1910, against France.
